= Ripheus =

Trojan warrior

Ripheus (also Rhipeus, Rifeo and Rupheo) was a Trojan hero and the name of a figure from the Aeneid of Virgil. A comrade of Aeneas, he was a Trojan who was killed defending his city against the Greeks. "Ripheus also fell," Virgil writes, "uniquely the most just of all the Trojans, the most faithful preserver of equity; but the gods decided otherwise" (Virgil, Aeneid II, 426–8). Ripheus's righteousness was not rewarded by the gods.

== Ripheus in later works ==
=== Dante ===
In his Divine Comedy, Dante placed Ripheus in Heaven, in the sixth sphere of Jupiter, the realm of those who personified justice.

Here, he provides an interesting foil to Virgil himself—whom Dante places in the first circle of Hell, with the pagans and the unbaptized—even though Virgil is a major character in the Commedia and for much of it remains Dante's guide through Hell and Purgatory. Although Ripheus would historically have been a pagan, in Dante's work he is portrayed as having been given a vision of Jesus over a thousand years before Christ's first coming, and was thus converted to Christianity in the midst of the Trojan War.

=== Boccaccio ===
In Boccaccio's Il Filostrato (1333–1339), Ripheus is named as one of the Trojans taken prisoner by the Greeks.

=== Chaucer ===
Il Filostrato served as the basis for Chaucer's Troilus and Criseyde. In it, Ripheo is mentioned as being unable to prevent Antenor from being taken prisoner. As Rupheo, he appears once, in final rhyming position.

=== João de Barros ===
João de Barros, who later became one of the main Portuguese historians of the 16th century, while still a young man of the court of King Manuel, wrote a chivalry romance called A Chronica do Emperador Clarimundo (The Chronicle of Emperor Clarimundo), in which it is reported that Tróia, Portugal was founded by a Trojan called Ripheus (in 16th-century Portuguese Riphane), who escaped the destruction of his city with the group of Aeneas, from which it split, and moved across the Mediterranean and into the Atlantic until reaching the Setúbal Peninsula. There, Ripheus/Riphane's group engaged in a war with a party of Greeks led by Ulysses that established itself in what now is Lisbon, on the opposite side of the Tagus river. This 'transplanted' Greek-Trojan war continued for some generations after the death of this Ripheus. It is unclear if this Ripheus/Riphane is the same as the one of Virgil, and the authors previously referred to, or just a similarly named Trojan countryman of the most famous Ripheus (the fact that de Barros makes no clear references to the known deeds of the Trojan war past of Ripheus in his book and that in the original myth Ripheus fell in the Greek conquest of the town seems to go against it, but possibly de Barros is basing himself in the Boccaccio tradition of Ripheus having been taken as prisoner by the Greeks having possibly escaped subsequently, and the fact that de Barros refers to Riphane as being morally impressive seem to make an identification of Riphane and Ripheus possible. It could be also debated that post-classical versions of myths making characters dead in the Trojan War survive after it is not unusual, being also told about Hector's son Astyanax to make him survive to found the ancient Gauls and Franks).

== Namesake ==
Jovian asteroid 188847 Rhipeus, discovered at the Calvin–Rehoboth Observatory in 2006, was named after the Trojan warrior. The official naming citation was published by the Minor Planet Center on 19 August 2008 (M.P.C. 63643).
