= Meanings of minor-planet names: 188001–189000 =

As minor planet discoveries are confirmed, they are given a permanent number by the IAU's Minor Planet Center (MPC), and the discoverers can then submit names for them, following the IAU's naming conventions. The list below concerns those minor planets in the specified number-range that have received names, and explains the meanings of those names.

Official naming citations of newly named small Solar System bodies are approved and published in a bulletin by IAU's Working Group for Small Bodies Nomenclature (WGSBN). Before May 2021, citations were published in MPC's Minor Planet Circulars for many decades. Recent citations can also be found on the JPL Small-Body Database (SBDB). Until his death in 2016, German astronomer Lutz D. Schmadel compiled these citations into the Dictionary of Minor Planet Names (DMP) and regularly updated the collection.

Based on Paul Herget's The Names of the Minor Planets, Schmadel also researched the unclear origin of numerous asteroids, most of which had been named prior to World War II. This article incorporates text from this source, which is in the public domain: SBDB New namings may only be added to this list below after official publication as the preannouncement of names is condemned. The WGSBN publishes a comprehensive guideline for the naming rules of non-cometary small Solar System bodies.

== 188001–188100 ==
Named minor planet	Provisional	This minor planet was named for...	Ref · Catalog
188061 Loomis	2001 VJ_{131}	Craig P. Loomis (born 1961), an American computing engineer with the Sloan Digital Sky Survey	JPL · 188061

== 188101–188200 ==
back to top

Named minor planet	Provisional	This minor planet was named for...	Ref · Catalog
188139 Stanbridge	2002 CN_{315}	Dale R. Stanbridge (born 1962), a senior engineer at KinetX who worked as a Navigation Team Member for the New Horizons mission to Pluto	JPL · 188139

== 188201–188300 ==
back to top

Named minor planet	Provisional	This minor planet was named for...	Ref · Catalog
188209 Solpera	2002 SO_{28}	Jan Solpera, Czech graphic designer, lettering artist, and university professor.	IAU · 188209
188256 Stothoff	2002 XT_{93}	Maria M. Stothoff (born 1966), a Public Affairs Deputy Chief at the Southwest Research Institute who worked for the New Horizons mission to Pluto	JPL · 188256

== 188301–188400 ==
back to top

Named minor planet	Provisional	This minor planet was named for...	Ref · Catalog
There are no named minor planets in this number range

== 188401–188500 ==
back to top

Named minor planet	Provisional	This minor planet was named for...	Ref · Catalog
188446 Louischevrolet	2004 HY_{5}	Louis Chevrolet (1878–1941), a Swiss race car driver and co-founder of the Chevrolet Motor Car Company in 1911	JPL · 188446

== 188501–188600 ==
back to top

Named minor planet	Provisional	This minor planet was named for...	Ref · Catalog
188502 Darrellstrobel	2004 PM_{115}	Darrell F. Strobel (born 1942), a research scientist at Johns Hopkins University who worked as a Co-Investigator for atmospheric science for the New Horizons mission to Pluto	JPL · 188502
188506 Roulet	2004 RR_{1}	Didier Roulet (b. 1948), a retired physics professor in the Collège de Candolle in Geneva (Switzerland).	IAU188506
188534 Mauna Kea	2004 RA_{252}	Mauna Kea (4,207 m; meaning "White Mountain"), a dormant volcano on the island of Hawaii	JPL · 188534
188576 Kosenda	2005 EL_{30}	Setsuo Kosenda (born 1955) established the Mikawa Astronomical Observatory, located in the Niigata region of Japan	JPL · 188576

== 188601–188700 ==
back to top

Named minor planet	Provisional	This minor planet was named for...	Ref · Catalog
188693 Roosevelt	2005 TO_{14}	Theodore Roosevelt (1858–1919) was the 26th President of the United States and is one of the most admired leaders in American history. Among his many accomplishments he is well known for his conservationism, having established the US Forest Service, five National Parks, 18 National Monuments, and 150 National Forests.	JPL · 188693

== 188701–188800 ==
back to top

Named minor planet	Provisional	This minor planet was named for...	Ref · Catalog
188800 Emilyfurfaro	2005 WO_{62}	Emily Furfaro, American science storyteller.	IAU · 188800

== 188801–188900 ==
back to top

Named minor planet	Provisional	This minor planet was named for...	Ref · Catalog
188806 Scottbednar	2005 WF_{103}	Scott Bednar, American filmmaker and science communicator who codirected and co-produced NASA’s Planetary Defenders documentary.	IAU · 188806
188808 Jessiewilde	2005 WS_{169}	Jessie Wilde, American filmmaker who co-directed and co-produced NASA’s Planetary Defenders documentary and the launch and impact broadcasts for NASA’s DART mission.	IAU · 188808
188809 Philgroves	2005 WX_{181}	Phil Groves, American filmmaker.	IAU · 188809
188816 Lajuanmoore	2005 XU_{24}	LaJuan Moore, American project support specialist for NASA’s Planetary Science Division and its Planetary Defense and Research and Analysis programs.	IAU · 188816
188822 Shoshanazweider	2005 YT_{65}	Shoshana Z. Weider, British planetary scientist.	IAU · 188822
188847 Rhipeus	2006 FT_{9}	Rhipeus (Ripheus), from Classical mythology. The Trojan warrior died fighting alongside his comrade Aeneas during the Trojan War. Rhipeus, the most just of the Trojans was not rewarded by the gods (Virgil).	JPL · 188847
188867 Tin Ho	2006 US_{174}	Tin Ho, or Tianhe District, is one of the fastest developing areas in Guangzhou, China. Many of Guangzhou's most iconic buildings are found in this district. Tin Ho is the Chinese name for the Milky Way.	JPL · 188867
188894 Gerberlouis	2006 XS_{56}	Louis Gerber (1928–2021), a Swiss banker and amateur astronomer from Fribourg, who was the first treasurer of the Robert A. Naef Foundation, which operates the Observatory Naef Épendes, where this minor planet was discovered.	IAU · 188894

== 188901–189000 ==
back to top

Named minor planet	Provisional	This minor planet was named for...	Ref · Catalog
188973 Siufaiwing	2008 EX_{36}	Siu Fai Wing (born 1946), a Chinese painter and sculptor	JPL · 188973
189000 Alfredkubin	2008 JZ_{20}	Alfred Kubin (1877–1959) is considered an important representative of expressionism	JPL · 189000

back to top

Preceded by 187,001–188,000	Meanings of minor-planet names List of minor planets: 188,001–189,000	Succeeded by 189,001–190,000
