= Calvin–Rehoboth Observatory =

Minor planets discovered: 110
see § List of discovered minor planets

The Calvin–Rehoboth Robotic Observatory (observatory code: G98) is an astronomical observatory developed jointly between Calvin University (formerly Calvin College) in Michigan and Rehoboth Christian School in New Mexico, United States. It consists of identical telescopes, one on each campus. Students at both schools use the telescopes as part of their study. The joint observatory has been in operation since 2004.

Since weather in Michigan is often problematic for visual astronomy, the joint observatory allows students at the college to operate the telescope in New Mexico remotely after having trained on the identical telescope locally. It provides access to research quality scientific equipment and training for the high school students.

The observatory was used to discover several minor planets, including 145475 Rehoboth, which was named for the high school, where the Calvin–Rehoboth Robotic Observatory is located, while 134244 De Young was named for Mike De Young, a former science teacher at the Rehoboth Christian School.

== List of discovered minor planets ==
More than a hundred discovered minor planets are credited directly to the discovering observatory (G98) by the Minor Planet Center (as Calvin College or Prairie School).

(129157) 2005 ET_{305}	10 March 2005	list^{[A]}
152233 Van Till	25 September 2005	list^{[A]}
(155054) 2005 SN_{19}	25 September 2005	list^{[A]}
(155067) 2005 SH_{58}	26 September 2005	list^{[A]}
(157694) 2006 AY_{2}	5 January 2006	list^{[A]}
(161595) 2005 SK_{19}	25 September 2005	list^{[A]}
167875 Kromminga	2 March 2005	list^{[A]}
(175199) 2005 ER_{305}	10 March 2005	list^{[A]}
(177906) 2005 SO_{19}	25 September 2005	list^{[A]}
(178227) 2006 WF_{1}	16 November 2006	list^{[A]}
(185141) 2006 SS_{130}	18 September 2006	list^{[A]}
(187644) 2007 DA_{1}	16 February 2007	list^{[A]}
(187645) 2007 DB_{1}	16 February 2007	list^{[A]}
188847 Rhipeus	23 March 2006	list^{[A]}
(188941) 2007 DT_{7}	17 February 2007	list^{[A]}
(202302) 2005 CF_{61}	3 February 2005	list^{[A]}
(204571) 2005 EX_{317}	9 March 2005	list^{[A]}
(210144) 2006 SZ_{56}	18 September 2006	list^{[A]}
(210298) 2007 TE_{105}	13 October 2007	list^{[A]}
210425 Imogene	10 January 2008	list^{[B]}
(212547) 2006 SD_{20}	18 September 2006	list^{[A]}
(212756) 2007 TY_{16}	7 October 2007	list^{[A]}
(212925) 2008 AL_{31}	10 January 2008	list^{[A]}
(214195) 2005 EW_{29}	2 March 2005	list^{[A]}
(214643) 2006 SA_{57}	18 September 2006	list^{[A]}

(215053) 2009 DL_{47}	26 February 2009	list^{[A]}
(217432) 2005 SF_{58}	26 September 2005	list^{[A]}
(218639) 2005 SM_{19}	25 September 2005	list^{[A]}
(219003) 2008 KR_{11}	27 May 2008	list^{[A]}
(227840) 2007 DC_{1}	16 February 2007	list^{[A]}
(227842) 2007 DK_{7}	17 February 2007	list^{[A]}
(229305) 2005 EN_{95}	4 March 2005	list^{[A]}
(233217) 2005 YM	20 December 2005	list^{[A]}
(236895) 2007 TZ_{16}	7 October 2007	list^{[A]}
(236896) 2007 TH_{17}	7 October 2007	list^{[A]}
(241513) 2009 DG_{48}	28 February 2009	list^{[A]}
(242962) 2006 SP_{49}	19 September 2006	list^{[A]}
(243158) 2007 TG_{68}	11 October 2007	list^{[A]}
243320 Jackuipers	24 September 2008	list^{[A]}
(243520) 2010 CH_{44}	14 February 2010	list^{[A]}
(246262) 2007 TJ_{17}	7 October 2007	list^{[A]}
(246483) 2007 XK_{3}	3 December 2007	list^{[A]}
(248787) 2006 SD_{57}	18 September 2006	list^{[A]}
(248974) 2007 DU_{7}	18 February 2007	list^{[A]}
(251556) 2009 DY_{14}	20 February 2009	list^{[A]}
(256461) 2007 DV_{7}	18 February 2007	list^{[A]}
(256874) 2008 DD_{17}	28 February 2008	list^{[A]}
(257189) 2008 KU_{11}	28 May 2008	list^{[A]}
(262959) 2007 DN_{84}	22 February 2007	list^{[A]}
(263664) 2008 GW_{109}	13 April 2008	list^{[A]}

(263763) 2008 KV_{11}	28 May 2008	list^{[A]}
(266397) 2007 EE_{171}	11 March 2007	list^{[A]}
(268488) 2005 YO	20 December 2005	list^{[A]}
(269147) 2008 DU_{4}	27 February 2008	list^{[A]}
(269374) 2009 AF_{17}	13 January 2009	list^{[A]}
(272099) 2005 GE_{120}	2 April 2005	list^{[A]}
(274234) 2008 LO_{16}	13 June 2008	list^{[A]}
(281847) 2010 CC_{44}	13 February 2010	list^{[A]}
(283192) 2010 CE_{44}	13 February 2010	list^{[A]}
(284634) 2007 VK_{267}	13 November 2007	list^{[A]}
(289436) 2005 EU_{29}	2 March 2005	list^{[A]}
(292182) 2006 SB_{20}	18 September 2006	list^{[A]}
(292226) 2006 SC_{57}	18 September 2006	list^{[A]}
(293310) 2007 DW_{40}	21 February 2007	list^{[A]}
(296247) 2009 DA_{15}	20 February 2009	list^{[A]}
(297004) 2010 FP_{31}	21 March 2010	list^{[A]}
(304350) 2006 SX_{290}	18 September 2006	list^{[A]}
(305223) 2007 XJ_{3}	3 December 2007	list^{[A]}
(305844) 2009 EQ_{1}	2 March 2009	list^{[A]}
(308191) 2005 CF_{62}	3 February 2005	list^{[A]}
(314718) 2006 SB_{57}	18 September 2006	list^{[A]}
(315053) 2007 DZ	16 February 2007	list^{[A]}
(319556) 2006 SA_{20}	18 September 2006	list^{[A]}
(321372) 2009 OB_{7}	27 July 2009	list^{[A]}
(325263) 2008 GX_{109}	13 April 2008	list^{[A]}

(325433) 2009 OR_{19}	30 July 2009	list^{[A]}
(328605) 2009 SF_{100}	20 September 2009	list^{[A]}
(330119) 2005 YL	20 December 2005	list^{[A]}
(340413) 2006 FS_{9}	23 March 2006	list^{[A]}
(340716) 2006 SE_{64}	18 September 2006	list^{[A]}
(341324) 2007 TA_{17}	7 October 2007	list^{[A]}
(341360) 2007 TB_{71}	13 October 2007	list^{[A]}
(345973) 2007 TN_{105}	15 October 2007	list^{[A]}
(353046) 2009 DZ_{14}	20 February 2009	list^{[A]}
(358000) 2006 DF_{63}	22 February 2006	list^{[A]}
(362131) 2009 DW_{42}	20 February 2009	list^{[A]}
(367428) 2008 SF_{11}	22 September 2008	list^{[A]}
(370871) 2005 EZ_{80}	4 March 2005	list^{[A]}
(372072) 2008 SH_{11}	22 September 2008	list^{[A]}
(375005) 2007 FM_{42}	26 March 2007	list^{[A]}
(375691) 2009 ME_{1}	22 June 2009	list^{[A]}
(381249) 2007 TD_{105}	13 October 2007	list^{[A]}
(381916) 2010 CD_{44}	13 February 2010	list^{[A]}
(384301) 2009 SS_{19}	20 September 2009	list^{[A]}
(384483) 2010 CU_{44}	15 February 2010	list^{[A]}
(385880) 2006 SB_{77}	18 September 2006	list^{[A]}
(386034) 2007 EM_{39}	12 March 2007	list^{[A]}
(389468) 2010 ER_{44}	12 March 2010	list^{[A]}
(390900) 2005 ES_{29}	2 March 2005	list^{[A]}
(394364) 2007 DD_{1}	18 February 2007	list^{[A]}

(402899) 2007 TE_{17}	7 October 2007	list^{[A]}
(406404) 2007 TP_{105}	15 October 2007	list^{[A]}
(410751) 2009 DK_{47}	26 February 2009	list^{[A]}
(410770) 2009 ER_{1}	2 March 2009	list^{[A]}
(435108) 2007 DS_{40}	18 February 2007	list^{[A]}
(440380) 2005 CD_{61}	3 February 2005	list^{[A]}
(455669) 2005 CB_{61}	3 February 2005	list^{[A]}
(465797) 2010 CS_{44}	14 February 2010	list^{[A]}
(467542) 2007 TC_{25}	8 October 2007	list^{[A]}
(475304) 2005 XB_{78}	10 December 2005	list^{[A]}
Credited by the MPC to:^{A} Calvin College^{B} Prairie School

== See also ==
- List of asteroid-discovering observatories
- List of minor planet discoverers § Discovering dedicated institutions
- List of observatory codes § G98
