= List of minor planets: 188001–189000 =

The following is a partial list of minor planets, running from minor-planet number 188001 through 189000, inclusive. The primary data for this and other partial lists is based on JPL's "Small-Body Orbital Elements" and data available from the Minor Planet Center. Critical list information is also provided by the MPC, unless otherwise specified from Lowell Observatory. A detailed description of the table's columns and additional sources are given on the main page including a complete list of every page in this series, and a statistical break-up on the dynamical classification of minor planets.

Also see the summary list of all named bodies in numerical and alphabetical order, and the corresponding naming citations for the number range of this particular list. New namings may only be added to this list after official publication, as the preannouncement of names is condemned by the Working Group for Small Bodies Nomenclature of the International Astronomical Union.

Near-Earth obj.	MBA (inner)	MBA (outer)	Centaur
Mars-crosser	MBA (middle)	Jupiter trojan	Trans-Neptunian obj.
Unclassified

== 188001–188100 ==
Designation			Discovery			Properties		Ref
Permanent	Provisional	Named after	Date	Site	Discoverer(s)	Category	Diam.	Ref
188001	2001 SP_{241}	—	September 19, 2001	Socorro	LINEAR	·	1.7 km	MPC · JPL
188002	2001 SQ_{241}	—	September 19, 2001	Socorro	LINEAR	·	1.3 km	MPC · JPL
188003	2001 SL_{260}	—	September 20, 2001	Socorro	LINEAR	·	2.7 km	MPC · JPL
188004	2001 SL_{271}	—	September 20, 2001	Socorro	LINEAR	·	1.7 km	MPC · JPL
188005	2001 SG_{284}	—	September 22, 2001	Kitt Peak	Spacewatch	·	1.7 km	MPC · JPL
188006	2001 SF_{317}	—	September 25, 2001	Palomar	NEAT	L5	10 km	MPC · JPL
188007	2001 TN_{7}	—	October 11, 2001	Desert Eagle	W. K. Y. Yeung	·	2.8 km	MPC · JPL
188008	2001 TP_{27}	—	October 14, 2001	Socorro	LINEAR	MAR	1.8 km	MPC · JPL
188009	2001 TN_{56}	—	October 15, 2001	Socorro	LINEAR	EUN	2.3 km	MPC · JPL
188010	2001 TR_{83}	—	October 14, 2001	Socorro	LINEAR	·	2.5 km	MPC · JPL
188011	2001 TC_{85}	—	October 14, 2001	Socorro	LINEAR	MAS	900 m	MPC · JPL
188012	2001 TO_{98}	—	October 14, 2001	Socorro	LINEAR	·	1.3 km	MPC · JPL
188013	2001 TQ_{124}	—	October 12, 2001	Haleakala	NEAT	EUN	2.1 km	MPC · JPL
188014	2001 TP_{137}	—	October 14, 2001	Palomar	NEAT	EUN	1.5 km	MPC · JPL
188015	2001 TO_{142}	—	October 10, 2001	Palomar	NEAT	·	3.3 km	MPC · JPL
188016	2001 TS_{163}	—	October 11, 2001	Palomar	NEAT	·	1.7 km	MPC · JPL
188017	2001 TK_{195}	—	October 15, 2001	Palomar	NEAT	·	2.2 km	MPC · JPL
188018	2001 TC_{204}	—	October 11, 2001	Socorro	LINEAR	·	1.6 km	MPC · JPL
188019	2001 TH_{208}	—	October 11, 2001	Palomar	NEAT	·	1.2 km	MPC · JPL
188020	2001 TH_{257}	—	October 10, 2001	Palomar	NEAT	L5	14 km	MPC · JPL
188021	2001 UD_{37}	—	October 16, 2001	Socorro	LINEAR	·	3.3 km	MPC · JPL
188022	2001 UD_{62}	—	October 17, 2001	Socorro	LINEAR	·	3.0 km	MPC · JPL
188023	2001 UK_{62}	—	October 17, 2001	Socorro	LINEAR	NYS	1.5 km	MPC · JPL
188024	2001 UO_{71}	—	October 19, 2001	Kitt Peak	Spacewatch	·	2.0 km	MPC · JPL
188025	2001 UM_{76}	—	October 17, 2001	Socorro	LINEAR	·	2.7 km	MPC · JPL
188026	2001 UE_{79}	—	October 20, 2001	Socorro	LINEAR	L5	14 km	MPC · JPL
188027	2001 UF_{84}	—	October 20, 2001	Socorro	LINEAR	·	3.0 km	MPC · JPL
188028	2001 UT_{112}	—	October 21, 2001	Socorro	LINEAR	·	3.7 km	MPC · JPL
188029	2001 UU_{112}	—	October 21, 2001	Socorro	LINEAR	HNS	1.6 km	MPC · JPL
188030	2001 UD_{117}	—	October 22, 2001	Socorro	LINEAR	·	1.3 km	MPC · JPL
188031	2001 UV_{118}	—	October 22, 2001	Socorro	LINEAR	(5)	1.7 km	MPC · JPL
188032	2001 UV_{120}	—	October 22, 2001	Socorro	LINEAR	·	2.7 km	MPC · JPL
188033	2001 UV_{123}	—	October 22, 2001	Palomar	NEAT	EUN	1.7 km	MPC · JPL
188034	2001 UY_{135}	—	October 22, 2001	Socorro	LINEAR	·	1.7 km	MPC · JPL
188035	2001 UJ_{136}	—	October 22, 2001	Socorro	LINEAR	·	1.8 km	MPC · JPL
188036	2001 UD_{154}	—	October 23, 2001	Socorro	LINEAR	MAR	1.8 km	MPC · JPL
188037	2001 UJ_{160}	—	October 23, 2001	Socorro	LINEAR	HNS	1.7 km	MPC · JPL
188038	2001 UH_{170}	—	October 21, 2001	Socorro	LINEAR	·	3.3 km	MPC · JPL
188039	2001 UG_{174}	—	October 18, 2001	Palomar	NEAT	·	2.6 km	MPC · JPL
188040	2001 UW_{176}	—	October 21, 2001	Socorro	LINEAR	·	2.9 km	MPC · JPL
188041	2001 UX_{184}	—	October 16, 2001	Palomar	NEAT	·	2.8 km	MPC · JPL
188042	2001 UE_{185}	—	October 17, 2001	Palomar	NEAT	·	1.3 km	MPC · JPL
188043	2001 UO_{190}	—	October 18, 2001	Palomar	NEAT	·	2.1 km	MPC · JPL
188044	2001 UA_{192}	—	October 18, 2001	Socorro	LINEAR	·	3.2 km	MPC · JPL
188045	2001 UG_{217}	—	October 24, 2001	Socorro	LINEAR	·	2.8 km	MPC · JPL
188046	2001 VP_{24}	—	November 9, 2001	Socorro	LINEAR	MAR	1.9 km	MPC · JPL
188047	2001 VW_{26}	—	November 9, 2001	Socorro	LINEAR	·	1.7 km	MPC · JPL
188048	2001 VU_{40}	—	November 9, 2001	Socorro	LINEAR	H	920 m	MPC · JPL
188049	2001 VJ_{41}	—	November 9, 2001	Socorro	LINEAR	·	1.6 km	MPC · JPL
188050	2001 VB_{53}	—	November 10, 2001	Socorro	LINEAR	·	3.4 km	MPC · JPL
188051	2001 VF_{68}	—	November 11, 2001	Socorro	LINEAR	H	910 m	MPC · JPL
188052	2001 VC_{77}	—	November 12, 2001	Haleakala	NEAT	·	3.4 km	MPC · JPL
188053	2001 VM_{83}	—	November 10, 2001	Socorro	LINEAR	L5	15 km	MPC · JPL
188054	2001 VN_{91}	—	November 15, 2001	Socorro	LINEAR	·	2.7 km	MPC · JPL
188055	2001 VA_{92}	—	November 15, 2001	Socorro	LINEAR	·	5.4 km	MPC · JPL
188056	2001 VU_{104}	—	November 12, 2001	Socorro	LINEAR	·	3.9 km	MPC · JPL
188057	2001 VB_{105}	—	November 12, 2001	Socorro	LINEAR	·	2.2 km	MPC · JPL
188058	2001 VC_{106}	—	November 12, 2001	Socorro	LINEAR	·	2.4 km	MPC · JPL
188059	2001 VH_{120}	—	November 12, 2001	Socorro	LINEAR	·	2.3 km	MPC · JPL
188060	2001 VG_{127}	—	November 11, 2001	Apache Point	SDSS	L5	10 km	MPC · JPL
188061 Loomis	2001 VJ_{131}	Loomis	November 11, 2001	Apache Point	SDSS	·	1.4 km	MPC · JPL
188062	2001 WT_{8}	—	November 17, 2001	Socorro	LINEAR	·	1.6 km	MPC · JPL
188063	2001 WV_{29}	—	November 17, 2001	Socorro	LINEAR	BRG	2.5 km	MPC · JPL
188064	2001 WE_{32}	—	November 17, 2001	Socorro	LINEAR	·	1.9 km	MPC · JPL
188065	2001 WK_{35}	—	November 17, 2001	Socorro	LINEAR	·	2.7 km	MPC · JPL
188066	2001 WR_{39}	—	November 17, 2001	Socorro	LINEAR	·	3.1 km	MPC · JPL
188067	2001 WO_{44}	—	November 18, 2001	Socorro	LINEAR	·	1.4 km	MPC · JPL
188068	2001 WL_{47}	—	November 17, 2001	Anderson Mesa	LONEOS	·	1.8 km	MPC · JPL
188069	2001 WP_{48}	—	November 19, 2001	Anderson Mesa	LONEOS	·	2.2 km	MPC · JPL
188070	2001 WR_{48}	—	November 19, 2001	Anderson Mesa	LONEOS	·	3.1 km	MPC · JPL
188071	2001 WV_{68}	—	November 20, 2001	Socorro	LINEAR	WIT	1.3 km	MPC · JPL
188072	2001 WE_{78}	—	November 20, 2001	Socorro	LINEAR	·	2.0 km	MPC · JPL
188073	2001 WX_{79}	—	November 20, 2001	Socorro	LINEAR	·	1.9 km	MPC · JPL
188074	2001 XC_{18}	—	December 9, 2001	Socorro	LINEAR	·	1.7 km	MPC · JPL
188075	2001 XN_{28}	—	December 11, 2001	Socorro	LINEAR	·	3.0 km	MPC · JPL
188076	2001 XE_{45}	—	December 9, 2001	Socorro	LINEAR	·	3.6 km	MPC · JPL
188077	2001 XW_{47}	—	December 9, 2001	Socorro	LINEAR	H · slow	1.4 km	MPC · JPL
188078	2001 XA_{64}	—	December 10, 2001	Socorro	LINEAR	·	4.0 km	MPC · JPL
188079	2001 XK_{64}	—	December 10, 2001	Socorro	LINEAR	H	1.1 km	MPC · JPL
188080	2001 XN_{79}	—	December 11, 2001	Socorro	LINEAR	·	2.8 km	MPC · JPL
188081	2001 XY_{87}	—	December 14, 2001	Desert Eagle	W. K. Y. Yeung	·	4.3 km	MPC · JPL
188082	2001 XV_{99}	—	December 10, 2001	Socorro	LINEAR	·	3.0 km	MPC · JPL
188083	2001 XM_{126}	—	December 14, 2001	Socorro	LINEAR	L5	10 km	MPC · JPL
188084	2001 XV_{126}	—	December 14, 2001	Socorro	LINEAR	·	2.9 km	MPC · JPL
188085	2001 XC_{127}	—	December 14, 2001	Socorro	LINEAR	·	1.8 km	MPC · JPL
188086	2001 XK_{136}	—	December 14, 2001	Socorro	LINEAR	·	2.7 km	MPC · JPL
188087	2001 XX_{136}	—	December 14, 2001	Socorro	LINEAR	·	4.7 km	MPC · JPL
188088	2001 XA_{141}	—	December 14, 2001	Socorro	LINEAR	·	2.7 km	MPC · JPL
188089	2001 XR_{146}	—	December 14, 2001	Socorro	LINEAR	·	1.9 km	MPC · JPL
188090	2001 XL_{157}	—	December 14, 2001	Socorro	LINEAR	·	3.1 km	MPC · JPL
188091	2001 XO_{159}	—	December 14, 2001	Socorro	LINEAR	MRX	1.6 km	MPC · JPL
188092	2001 XR_{166}	—	December 14, 2001	Socorro	LINEAR	·	2.3 km	MPC · JPL
188093	2001 XG_{179}	—	December 14, 2001	Socorro	LINEAR	MRX	1.3 km	MPC · JPL
188094	2001 XK_{219}	—	December 15, 2001	Socorro	LINEAR	·	2.4 km	MPC · JPL
188095	2001 XL_{230}	—	December 15, 2001	Socorro	LINEAR	·	2.6 km	MPC · JPL
188096	2001 XY_{243}	—	December 15, 2001	Socorro	LINEAR	·	2.7 km	MPC · JPL
188097	2001 YM_{6}	—	December 20, 2001	Cima Ekar	ADAS	·	3.5 km	MPC · JPL
188098	2001 YT_{13}	—	December 17, 2001	Socorro	LINEAR	KOR	2.1 km	MPC · JPL
188099	2001 YT_{42}	—	December 18, 2001	Socorro	LINEAR	·	2.5 km	MPC · JPL
188100	2001 YC_{61}	—	December 18, 2001	Socorro	LINEAR	·	3.0 km	MPC · JPL

== 188101–188200 ==
back to top

Designation			Discovery			Properties		Ref
Permanent	Provisional	Named after	Date	Site	Discoverer(s)	Category	Diam.	Ref
188101	2001 YQ_{66}	—	December 18, 2001	Socorro	LINEAR	·	4.7 km	MPC · JPL
188102	2001 YS_{102}	—	December 17, 2001	Socorro	LINEAR	·	3.4 km	MPC · JPL
188103	2001 YT_{103}	—	December 17, 2001	Socorro	LINEAR	·	3.5 km	MPC · JPL
188104	2001 YA_{106}	—	December 17, 2001	Socorro	LINEAR	·	2.2 km	MPC · JPL
188105	2001 YQ_{110}	—	December 18, 2001	Kitt Peak	Spacewatch	·	1.8 km	MPC · JPL
188106	2001 YX_{115}	—	December 17, 2001	Socorro	LINEAR	·	3.3 km	MPC · JPL
188107	2001 YY_{117}	—	December 18, 2001	Socorro	LINEAR	·	2.2 km	MPC · JPL
188108	2001 YU_{140}	—	December 17, 2001	Socorro	LINEAR	·	2.0 km	MPC · JPL
188109	2002 AR_{8}	—	January 7, 2002	Kitt Peak	Spacewatch	KOR	1.6 km	MPC · JPL
188110	2002 AM_{32}	—	January 8, 2002	Haleakala	NEAT	·	3.5 km	MPC · JPL
188111	2002 AX_{36}	—	January 9, 2002	Socorro	LINEAR	·	3.2 km	MPC · JPL
188112	2002 AA_{66}	—	January 12, 2002	Socorro	LINEAR	·	2.9 km	MPC · JPL
188113	2002 AM_{67}	—	January 9, 2002	Campo Imperatore	CINEOS	MRX	1.6 km	MPC · JPL
188114	2002 AF_{82}	—	January 9, 2002	Socorro	LINEAR	·	3.7 km	MPC · JPL
188115	2002 AE_{83}	—	January 9, 2002	Socorro	LINEAR	·	2.6 km	MPC · JPL
188116	2002 AN_{97}	—	January 8, 2002	Socorro	LINEAR	MRX	1.6 km	MPC · JPL
188117	2002 AO_{171}	—	January 14, 2002	Socorro	LINEAR	·	2.3 km	MPC · JPL
188118	2002 AW_{180}	—	January 5, 2002	Palomar	NEAT	GAL	3.4 km	MPC · JPL
188119	2002 AV_{183}	—	January 6, 2002	Goodricke-Pigott	R. A. Tucker	·	4.3 km	MPC · JPL
188120	2002 AB_{208}	—	January 8, 2002	Palomar	NEAT	·	3.0 km	MPC · JPL
188121	2002 BX_{19}	—	January 22, 2002	Socorro	LINEAR	·	2.6 km	MPC · JPL
188122	2002 CH	—	February 6, 2002	Socorro	LINEAR	slow	4.1 km	MPC · JPL
188123	2002 CT	—	February 2, 2002	Cima Ekar	ADAS	·	2.4 km	MPC · JPL
188124	2002 CR_{28}	—	February 6, 2002	Socorro	LINEAR	·	3.5 km	MPC · JPL
188125	2002 CL_{65}	—	February 6, 2002	Socorro	LINEAR	EOS	2.3 km	MPC · JPL
188126	2002 CN_{68}	—	February 7, 2002	Socorro	LINEAR	·	2.1 km	MPC · JPL
188127	2002 CM_{94}	—	February 7, 2002	Socorro	LINEAR	·	3.3 km	MPC · JPL
188128	2002 CE_{99}	—	February 7, 2002	Socorro	LINEAR	·	5.8 km	MPC · JPL
188129	2002 CL_{102}	—	February 7, 2002	Socorro	LINEAR	HYG	3.5 km	MPC · JPL
188130	2002 CB_{113}	—	February 8, 2002	Socorro	LINEAR	·	3.1 km	MPC · JPL
188131	2002 CK_{149}	—	February 10, 2002	Socorro	LINEAR	·	2.7 km	MPC · JPL
188132	2002 CG_{158}	—	February 7, 2002	Socorro	LINEAR	KOR	1.9 km	MPC · JPL
188133	2002 CE_{211}	—	February 10, 2002	Socorro	LINEAR	·	3.0 km	MPC · JPL
188134	2002 CE_{230}	—	February 11, 2002	Kitt Peak	Spacewatch	THM	3.6 km	MPC · JPL
188135	2002 CH_{233}	—	February 11, 2002	Socorro	LINEAR	·	4.4 km	MPC · JPL
188136	2002 CP_{233}	—	February 11, 2002	Socorro	LINEAR	·	4.5 km	MPC · JPL
188137	2002 CU_{246}	—	February 13, 2002	Kitt Peak	Spacewatch	·	3.2 km	MPC · JPL
188138	2002 CF_{302}	—	February 12, 2002	Socorro	LINEAR	·	4.0 km	MPC · JPL
188139 Stanbridge	2002 CN_{315}	Stanbridge	February 6, 2002	Kitt Peak	M. W. Buie	·	3.5 km	MPC · JPL
188140	2002 EW_{12}	—	March 14, 2002	Palomar	NEAT	·	4.0 km	MPC · JPL
188141	2002 EA_{36}	—	March 9, 2002	Kitt Peak	Spacewatch	EOS	2.2 km	MPC · JPL
188142	2002 EC_{42}	—	March 12, 2002	Socorro	LINEAR	·	3.2 km	MPC · JPL
188143	2002 EB_{50}	—	March 12, 2002	Palomar	NEAT	THM	3.1 km	MPC · JPL
188144	2002 EH_{60}	—	March 13, 2002	Socorro	LINEAR	·	3.0 km	MPC · JPL
188145	2002 EW_{81}	—	March 13, 2002	Palomar	NEAT	fast	4.0 km	MPC · JPL
188146	2002 EA_{90}	—	March 12, 2002	Socorro	LINEAR	·	4.5 km	MPC · JPL
188147	2002 EP_{96}	—	March 11, 2002	Kitt Peak	Spacewatch	THM	3.6 km	MPC · JPL
188148	2002 FG_{27}	—	March 20, 2002	Socorro	LINEAR	·	6.2 km	MPC · JPL
188149	2002 FU_{30}	—	March 20, 2002	Palomar	NEAT	EOS	2.7 km	MPC · JPL
188150	2002 FV_{38}	—	March 30, 2002	Palomar	NEAT	·	4.0 km	MPC · JPL
188151	2002 FZ_{39}	—	March 18, 2002	Socorro	LINEAR	·	6.7 km	MPC · JPL
188152	2002 GK	—	April 2, 2002	Kleť	Kleť	·	4.3 km	MPC · JPL
188153	2002 GZ_{15}	—	April 15, 2002	Socorro	LINEAR	·	5.1 km	MPC · JPL
188154	2002 GB_{41}	—	April 4, 2002	Kitt Peak	Spacewatch	THM	3.0 km	MPC · JPL
188155	2002 GK_{45}	—	April 4, 2002	Palomar	NEAT	·	4.6 km	MPC · JPL
188156	2002 GU_{88}	—	April 10, 2002	Socorro	LINEAR	·	5.5 km	MPC · JPL
188157	2002 GO_{92}	—	April 9, 2002	Palomar	NEAT	EOS	3.3 km	MPC · JPL
188158	2002 GY_{97}	—	April 10, 2002	Palomar	NEAT	·	4.3 km	MPC · JPL
188159	2002 GQ_{98}	—	April 10, 2002	Socorro	LINEAR	·	3.4 km	MPC · JPL
188160	2002 GU_{107}	—	April 11, 2002	Socorro	LINEAR	·	5.1 km	MPC · JPL
188161	2002 GN_{108}	—	April 11, 2002	Palomar	NEAT	·	4.4 km	MPC · JPL
188162	2002 GK_{109}	—	April 11, 2002	Anderson Mesa	LONEOS	·	6.7 km	MPC · JPL
188163	2002 GR_{111}	—	April 10, 2002	Socorro	LINEAR	EOS	3.0 km	MPC · JPL
188164	2002 GP_{122}	—	April 10, 2002	Socorro	LINEAR	VER	5.0 km	MPC · JPL
188165	2002 GN_{123}	—	April 11, 2002	Socorro	LINEAR	THB	5.5 km	MPC · JPL
188166	2002 GO_{128}	—	April 12, 2002	Socorro	LINEAR	HYG	4.4 km	MPC · JPL
188167	2002 GT_{133}	—	April 12, 2002	Socorro	LINEAR	·	4.2 km	MPC · JPL
188168	2002 GL_{151}	—	April 14, 2002	Palomar	NEAT	EOS	2.9 km	MPC · JPL
188169	2002 GN_{159}	—	April 14, 2002	Socorro	LINEAR	·	4.1 km	MPC · JPL
188170	2002 GQ_{179}	—	April 14, 2002	Palomar	NEAT	ELF	6.3 km	MPC · JPL
188171	2002 GR_{179}	—	April 11, 2002	Palomar	NEAT	·	4.7 km	MPC · JPL
188172	2002 HJ_{13}	—	April 22, 2002	Socorro	LINEAR	·	7.4 km	MPC · JPL
188173	2002 HN_{15}	—	April 17, 2002	Socorro	LINEAR	·	3.8 km	MPC · JPL
188174	2002 JC	—	May 1, 2002	Socorro	LINEAR	ATE +1km	1.1 km	MPC · JPL
188175	2002 JS_{5}	—	May 5, 2002	Palomar	NEAT	·	4.9 km	MPC · JPL
188176	2002 JW_{8}	—	May 5, 2002	Socorro	LINEAR	T_{j} (2.96)	7.1 km	MPC · JPL
188177	2002 JH_{47}	—	May 9, 2002	Socorro	LINEAR	·	6.6 km	MPC · JPL
188178	2002 JL_{73}	—	May 8, 2002	Socorro	LINEAR	·	6.8 km	MPC · JPL
188179	2002 JW_{78}	—	May 11, 2002	Socorro	LINEAR	LIX	5.4 km	MPC · JPL
188180	2002 JC_{84}	—	May 11, 2002	Socorro	LINEAR	·	6.2 km	MPC · JPL
188181	2002 JH_{108}	—	May 14, 2002	Palomar	NEAT	·	6.1 km	MPC · JPL
188182	2002 JA_{116}	—	May 3, 2002	Palomar	NEAT	·	7.9 km	MPC · JPL
188183	2002 JM_{118}	—	May 5, 2002	Palomar	NEAT	EUP	6.5 km	MPC · JPL
188184	2002 JE_{123}	—	May 6, 2002	Palomar	NEAT	·	5.6 km	MPC · JPL
188185	2002 JQ_{145}	—	May 14, 2002	Palomar	NEAT	·	6.0 km	MPC · JPL
188186	2002 LQ_{14}	—	June 6, 2002	Socorro	LINEAR	THB	5.9 km	MPC · JPL
188187	2002 LA_{27}	—	June 7, 2002	Socorro	LINEAR	THB	7.7 km	MPC · JPL
188188	2002 NW_{37}	—	July 9, 2002	Socorro	LINEAR	T_{j} (2.95) · HIL	7.6 km	MPC · JPL
188189	2002 PL_{84}	—	August 10, 2002	Socorro	LINEAR	·	1.9 km	MPC · JPL
188190	2002 PV_{159}	—	August 8, 2002	Palomar	S. F. Hönig	·	1.1 km	MPC · JPL
188191	2002 QF_{16}	—	August 26, 2002	Palomar	NEAT	·	1.2 km	MPC · JPL
188192	2002 QE_{17}	—	August 27, 2002	Palomar	NEAT	·	1.1 km	MPC · JPL
188193	2002 QV_{51}	—	August 29, 2002	Palomar	S. F. Hönig	·	910 m	MPC · JPL
188194	2002 RJ_{15}	—	September 4, 2002	Anderson Mesa	LONEOS	·	1.4 km	MPC · JPL
188195	2002 RP_{21}	—	September 4, 2002	Anderson Mesa	LONEOS	·	1.0 km	MPC · JPL
188196	2002 RU_{35}	—	September 5, 2002	Anderson Mesa	LONEOS	·	1.2 km	MPC · JPL
188197	2002 RA_{54}	—	September 5, 2002	Socorro	LINEAR	·	860 m	MPC · JPL
188198	2002 RX_{59}	—	September 5, 2002	Anderson Mesa	LONEOS	·	1.7 km	MPC · JPL
188199	2002 RD_{90}	—	September 5, 2002	Socorro	LINEAR	·	1.3 km	MPC · JPL
188200	2002 RA_{113}	—	September 6, 2002	Socorro	LINEAR	·	1.4 km	MPC · JPL

== 188201–188300 ==
back to top

Designation			Discovery			Properties		Ref
Permanent	Provisional	Named after	Date	Site	Discoverer(s)	Category	Diam.	Ref
188201	2002 RG_{144}	—	September 11, 2002	Palomar	NEAT	·	980 m	MPC · JPL
188202	2002 RO_{168}	—	September 13, 2002	Palomar	NEAT	·	880 m	MPC · JPL
188203	2002 RD_{213}	—	September 12, 2002	Haleakala	NEAT	·	1.4 km	MPC · JPL
188204	2002 RO_{228}	—	September 14, 2002	Haleakala	NEAT	·	1.0 km	MPC · JPL
188205	2002 RE_{238}	—	September 15, 2002	Palomar	R. Matson	·	950 m	MPC · JPL
188206	2002 RR_{242}	—	September 14, 2002	Palomar	NEAT	·	950 m	MPC · JPL
188207	2002 SP_{10}	—	September 27, 2002	Palomar	NEAT	·	1.8 km	MPC · JPL
188208	2002 SM_{24}	—	September 28, 2002	Palomar	NEAT	·	910 m	MPC · JPL
188209 Solpera	2002 SO_{28}	Solpera	September 30, 2002	Kleť	KLENOT	MAS	970 m	MPC · JPL
188210	2002 SP_{52}	—	September 17, 2002	Palomar	NEAT	·	2.4 km	MPC · JPL
188211	2002 SM_{57}	—	September 30, 2002	Haleakala	NEAT	·	1.1 km	MPC · JPL
188212	2002 TL_{10}	—	October 2, 2002	Socorro	LINEAR	·	1.0 km	MPC · JPL
188213	2002 TD_{18}	—	October 2, 2002	Socorro	LINEAR	·	1.0 km	MPC · JPL
188214	2002 TO_{20}	—	October 2, 2002	Socorro	LINEAR	·	1.2 km	MPC · JPL
188215	2002 TY_{22}	—	October 2, 2002	Socorro	LINEAR	·	1.2 km	MPC · JPL
188216	2002 TS_{37}	—	October 2, 2002	Socorro	LINEAR	·	1.2 km	MPC · JPL
188217	2002 TM_{40}	—	October 2, 2002	Socorro	LINEAR	(2076)	1.9 km	MPC · JPL
188218	2002 TK_{46}	—	October 2, 2002	Socorro	LINEAR	·	1.0 km	MPC · JPL
188219	2002 TK_{51}	—	October 2, 2002	Socorro	LINEAR	·	2.2 km	MPC · JPL
188220	2002 TP_{86}	—	October 3, 2002	Socorro	LINEAR	·	790 m	MPC · JPL
188221	2002 TQ_{105}	—	October 4, 2002	Socorro	LINEAR	·	1.4 km	MPC · JPL
188222	2002 TC_{107}	—	October 3, 2002	Socorro	LINEAR	·	2.9 km	MPC · JPL
188223	2002 TC_{143}	—	October 4, 2002	Socorro	LINEAR	·	1.9 km	MPC · JPL
188224	2002 TC_{144}	—	October 4, 2002	Socorro	LINEAR	·	1.2 km	MPC · JPL
188225	2002 TY_{184}	—	October 4, 2002	Socorro	LINEAR	·	900 m	MPC · JPL
188226	2002 TK_{215}	—	October 4, 2002	Socorro	LINEAR	·	2.0 km	MPC · JPL
188227	2002 TR_{238}	—	October 7, 2002	Socorro	LINEAR	·	1.8 km	MPC · JPL
188228	2002 TH_{267}	—	October 10, 2002	Socorro	LINEAR	·	1.5 km	MPC · JPL
188229	2002 TP_{282}	—	October 10, 2002	Socorro	LINEAR	·	1.3 km	MPC · JPL
188230	2002 TO_{300}	—	October 15, 2002	Eskridge	Farpoint	·	1.9 km	MPC · JPL
188231	2002 TU_{354}	—	October 10, 2002	Apache Point	SDSS	·	1.5 km	MPC · JPL
188232	2002 TP_{364}	—	October 10, 2002	Apache Point	SDSS	·	1.0 km	MPC · JPL
188233	2002 UY_{15}	—	October 30, 2002	Palomar	NEAT	V	870 m	MPC · JPL
188234	2002 UO_{74}	—	October 30, 2002	Palomar	NEAT	L5	9.7 km	MPC · JPL
188235	2002 UU_{74}	—	October 30, 2002	Palomar	NEAT	·	1.9 km	MPC · JPL
188236	2002 VY	—	November 1, 2002	Socorro	LINEAR	·	1.5 km	MPC · JPL
188237	2002 VO_{25}	—	November 5, 2002	Socorro	LINEAR	·	1.1 km	MPC · JPL
188238	2002 VU_{48}	—	November 5, 2002	Anderson Mesa	LONEOS	MAS	1.4 km	MPC · JPL
188239	2002 VM_{49}	—	November 5, 2002	Anderson Mesa	LONEOS	·	1.6 km	MPC · JPL
188240	2002 VX_{50}	—	November 6, 2002	Anderson Mesa	LONEOS	·	1.5 km	MPC · JPL
188241	2002 VJ_{66}	—	November 6, 2002	Socorro	LINEAR	·	1.1 km	MPC · JPL
188242	2002 VS_{72}	—	November 7, 2002	Socorro	LINEAR	·	1.2 km	MPC · JPL
188243	2002 VH_{77}	—	November 7, 2002	Socorro	LINEAR	·	2.6 km	MPC · JPL
188244	2002 VF_{78}	—	November 7, 2002	Socorro	LINEAR	·	2.4 km	MPC · JPL
188245	2002 VW_{112}	—	November 13, 2002	Palomar	NEAT	·	1.5 km	MPC · JPL
188246	2002 WE_{15}	—	November 28, 2002	Anderson Mesa	LONEOS	·	1.6 km	MPC · JPL
188247	2002 WS_{23}	—	November 24, 2002	Palomar	NEAT	L5	15 km	MPC · JPL
188248	2002 XC_{28}	—	December 5, 2002	Socorro	LINEAR	·	4.7 km	MPC · JPL
188249	2002 XU_{53}	—	December 10, 2002	Palomar	NEAT	·	2.1 km	MPC · JPL
188250	2002 XA_{68}	—	December 11, 2002	Palomar	NEAT	·	1.9 km	MPC · JPL
188251	2002 XK_{70}	—	December 10, 2002	Socorro	LINEAR	·	2.0 km	MPC · JPL
188252	2002 XP_{72}	—	December 11, 2002	Socorro	LINEAR	·	2.2 km	MPC · JPL
188253	2002 XM_{73}	—	December 11, 2002	Socorro	LINEAR	V	1.1 km	MPC · JPL
188254	2002 XN_{76}	—	December 11, 2002	Socorro	LINEAR	·	2.1 km	MPC · JPL
188255	2002 XX_{90}	—	December 15, 2002	Haleakala	NEAT	EUN	2.6 km	MPC · JPL
188256 Stothoff	2002 XT_{93}	Stothoff	December 7, 2002	Kitt Peak	M. W. Buie	·	2.2 km	MPC · JPL
188257	2002 XM_{117}	—	December 10, 2002	Palomar	NEAT	L5	10 km	MPC · JPL
188258	2002 YN_{5}	—	December 30, 2002	Socorro	LINEAR	·	3.0 km	MPC · JPL
188259	2002 YR_{10}	—	December 31, 2002	Socorro	LINEAR	·	2.6 km	MPC · JPL
188260	2002 YV_{12}	—	December 31, 2002	Socorro	LINEAR	·	1.3 km	MPC · JPL
188261	2002 YP_{21}	—	December 31, 2002	Socorro	LINEAR	·	1.5 km	MPC · JPL
188262	2002 YK_{28}	—	December 31, 2002	Socorro	LINEAR	·	1.8 km	MPC · JPL
188263	2002 YT_{30}	—	December 31, 2002	Socorro	LINEAR	·	1.8 km	MPC · JPL
188264	2003 AF	—	January 1, 2003	Socorro	LINEAR	·	1.8 km	MPC · JPL
188265	2003 AL_{19}	—	January 5, 2003	Socorro	LINEAR	·	2.3 km	MPC · JPL
188266	2003 AB_{21}	—	January 5, 2003	Socorro	LINEAR	·	2.0 km	MPC · JPL
188267	2003 AQ_{26}	—	January 4, 2003	Socorro	LINEAR	·	2.1 km	MPC · JPL
188268	2003 AV_{26}	—	January 4, 2003	Socorro	LINEAR	·	1.8 km	MPC · JPL
188269	2003 AN_{33}	—	January 5, 2003	Socorro	LINEAR	ADE	3.8 km	MPC · JPL
188270	2003 AD_{34}	—	January 5, 2003	Kitt Peak	Spacewatch	·	1.7 km	MPC · JPL
188271	2003 AX_{40}	—	January 7, 2003	Socorro	LINEAR	·	2.0 km	MPC · JPL
188272	2003 AO_{42}	—	January 7, 2003	Socorro	LINEAR	·	2.7 km	MPC · JPL
188273	2003 AK_{43}	—	January 5, 2003	Socorro	LINEAR	·	2.0 km	MPC · JPL
188274	2003 AS_{48}	—	January 5, 2003	Socorro	LINEAR	EUN	1.9 km	MPC · JPL
188275	2003 AL_{49}	—	January 5, 2003	Socorro	LINEAR	·	2.2 km	MPC · JPL
188276	2003 AS_{52}	—	January 5, 2003	Socorro	LINEAR	·	2.0 km	MPC · JPL
188277	2003 AK_{56}	—	January 5, 2003	Socorro	LINEAR	·	1.8 km	MPC · JPL
188278	2003 AO_{74}	—	January 10, 2003	Socorro	LINEAR	KRM	3.0 km	MPC · JPL
188279	2003 AX_{78}	—	January 10, 2003	Kitt Peak	Spacewatch	·	2.1 km	MPC · JPL
188280	2003 AF_{80}	—	January 12, 2003	Kitt Peak	Spacewatch	EUN	2.4 km	MPC · JPL
188281	2003 AL_{87}	—	January 1, 2003	Socorro	LINEAR	·	1.8 km	MPC · JPL
188282	2003 AL_{94}	—	January 13, 2003	Socorro	LINEAR	·	3.9 km	MPC · JPL
188283	2003 BO_{2}	—	January 26, 2003	Kitt Peak	Spacewatch	·	2.0 km	MPC · JPL
188284	2003 BP_{29}	—	January 27, 2003	Socorro	LINEAR	·	2.1 km	MPC · JPL
188285	2003 BQ_{38}	—	January 27, 2003	Socorro	LINEAR	·	1.3 km	MPC · JPL
188286	2003 BQ_{39}	—	January 27, 2003	Socorro	LINEAR	·	2.1 km	MPC · JPL
188287	2003 BU_{49}	—	January 27, 2003	Anderson Mesa	LONEOS	·	2.0 km	MPC · JPL
188288	2003 BP_{58}	—	January 27, 2003	Socorro	LINEAR	·	2.1 km	MPC · JPL
188289	2003 BM_{65}	—	January 30, 2003	Anderson Mesa	LONEOS	·	1.8 km	MPC · JPL
188290	2003 BW_{65}	—	January 30, 2003	Anderson Mesa	LONEOS	·	2.0 km	MPC · JPL
188291	2003 BV_{67}	—	January 27, 2003	Socorro	LINEAR	·	2.0 km	MPC · JPL
188292	2003 BP_{71}	—	January 28, 2003	Socorro	LINEAR	EUN	2.1 km	MPC · JPL
188293	2003 BJ_{76}	—	January 29, 2003	Palomar	NEAT	·	2.7 km	MPC · JPL
188294	2003 BJ_{92}	—	January 26, 2003	Anderson Mesa	LONEOS	·	2.7 km	MPC · JPL
188295	2003 CE_{3}	—	February 2, 2003	Socorro	LINEAR	·	2.4 km	MPC · JPL
188296	2003 CK_{4}	—	February 1, 2003	Socorro	LINEAR	·	1.9 km	MPC · JPL
188297	2003 CR_{18}	—	February 6, 2003	Kitt Peak	Spacewatch	·	2.4 km	MPC · JPL
188298	2003 EK_{9}	—	March 6, 2003	Socorro	LINEAR	·	3.4 km	MPC · JPL
188299	2003 ED_{22}	—	March 6, 2003	Anderson Mesa	LONEOS	·	4.2 km	MPC · JPL
188300	2003 EU_{25}	—	March 6, 2003	Anderson Mesa	LONEOS	·	2.6 km	MPC · JPL

== 188301–188400 ==
back to top

Designation			Discovery			Properties		Ref
Permanent	Provisional	Named after	Date	Site	Discoverer(s)	Category	Diam.	Ref
188301	2003 EV_{31}	—	March 7, 2003	Socorro	LINEAR	·	3.8 km	MPC · JPL
188302	2003 EP_{34}	—	March 7, 2003	Socorro	LINEAR	MAR	1.7 km	MPC · JPL
188303	2003 EJ_{45}	—	March 7, 2003	Socorro	LINEAR	·	2.7 km	MPC · JPL
188304	2003 ET_{50}	—	March 10, 2003	Kitt Peak	Spacewatch	NEM	2.6 km	MPC · JPL
188305	2003 EU_{51}	—	March 11, 2003	Palomar	NEAT	EUN	1.7 km	MPC · JPL
188306	2003 EL_{62}	—	March 9, 2003	Socorro	LINEAR	·	3.1 km	MPC · JPL
188307	2003 ER_{62}	—	March 12, 2003	Palomar	NEAT	·	2.2 km	MPC · JPL
188308	2003 FF_{9}	—	March 21, 2003	Palomar	NEAT	·	3.1 km	MPC · JPL
188309	2003 FX_{9}	—	March 22, 2003	Haleakala	NEAT	·	3.1 km	MPC · JPL
188310	2003 FJ_{11}	—	March 23, 2003	Kitt Peak	Spacewatch	·	2.1 km	MPC · JPL
188311	2003 FK_{19}	—	March 25, 2003	Palomar	NEAT	·	2.8 km	MPC · JPL
188312	2003 FB_{33}	—	March 23, 2003	Kitt Peak	Spacewatch	·	2.0 km	MPC · JPL
188313	2003 FM_{36}	—	March 23, 2003	Kitt Peak	Spacewatch	·	6.5 km	MPC · JPL
188314	2003 FA_{62}	—	March 26, 2003	Palomar	NEAT	·	3.2 km	MPC · JPL
188315	2003 FJ_{63}	—	March 26, 2003	Palomar	NEAT	·	3.0 km	MPC · JPL
188316	2003 FG_{91}	—	March 29, 2003	Anderson Mesa	LONEOS	·	3.9 km	MPC · JPL
188317	2003 FS_{130}	—	March 27, 2003	Palomar	NEAT	·	2.8 km	MPC · JPL
188318	2003 GY_{9}	—	April 2, 2003	Haleakala	NEAT	DOR	2.6 km	MPC · JPL
188319	2003 GB_{30}	—	April 5, 2003	Kitt Peak	Spacewatch	·	3.3 km	MPC · JPL
188320	2003 HE_{7}	—	April 24, 2003	Kitt Peak	Spacewatch	·	3.0 km	MPC · JPL
188321	2003 HM_{7}	—	April 24, 2003	Anderson Mesa	LONEOS	·	3.7 km	MPC · JPL
188322	2003 HT_{13}	—	April 25, 2003	Kitt Peak	Spacewatch	H	780 m	MPC · JPL
188323	2003 HT_{25}	—	April 25, 2003	Kitt Peak	Spacewatch	·	3.8 km	MPC · JPL
188324	2003 JD_{16}	—	May 9, 2003	Haleakala	NEAT	·	4.5 km	MPC · JPL
188325	2003 KW_{13}	—	May 28, 2003	Haleakala	NEAT	·	3.5 km	MPC · JPL
188326	2003 NY_{1}	—	July 2, 2003	Socorro	LINEAR	·	4.6 km	MPC · JPL
188327	2003 NG_{3}	—	July 4, 2003	Socorro	LINEAR	·	5.5 km	MPC · JPL
188328	2003 NV_{8}	—	July 2, 2003	Anderson Mesa	LONEOS	·	9.3 km	MPC · JPL
188329	2003 OO_{3}	—	July 22, 2003	Haleakala	NEAT	·	5.2 km	MPC · JPL
188330	2003 OU_{8}	—	July 22, 2003	Socorro	LINEAR	·	4.8 km	MPC · JPL
188331	2003 OZ_{32}	—	July 24, 2003	Palomar	NEAT	·	4.3 km	MPC · JPL
188332	2003 QD_{3}	—	August 19, 2003	Campo Imperatore	CINEOS	·	3.2 km	MPC · JPL
188333	2003 QF_{10}	—	August 21, 2003	Haleakala	NEAT	H	920 m	MPC · JPL
188334	2003 QU_{30}	—	August 24, 2003	Socorro	LINEAR	H	1 km	MPC · JPL
188335	2003 QD_{48}	—	August 20, 2003	Palomar	NEAT	·	4.8 km	MPC · JPL
188336	2003 QB_{58}	—	August 23, 2003	Socorro	LINEAR	·	1.6 km	MPC · JPL
188337	2003 QZ_{66}	—	August 23, 2003	Palomar	NEAT	·	5.2 km	MPC · JPL
188338	2003 QW_{112}	—	August 25, 2003	Palomar	NEAT	H	810 m	MPC · JPL
188339	2003 RQ_{8}	—	September 7, 2003	Socorro	LINEAR	H	900 m	MPC · JPL
188340	2003 SL_{32}	—	September 18, 2003	Campo Imperatore	CINEOS	TIR	5.6 km	MPC · JPL
188341	2003 SJ_{61}	—	September 17, 2003	Socorro	LINEAR	3:2 · SHU	8.1 km	MPC · JPL
188342	2003 SV_{83}	—	September 18, 2003	Palomar	NEAT	3:2	7.6 km	MPC · JPL
188343	2003 SQ_{117}	—	September 16, 2003	Palomar	NEAT	·	7.5 km	MPC · JPL
188344	2003 SA_{123}	—	September 18, 2003	Socorro	LINEAR	·	4.5 km	MPC · JPL
188345	2003 SF_{208}	—	September 23, 2003	Palomar	NEAT	·	4.7 km	MPC · JPL
188346	2003 SC_{302}	—	September 17, 2003	Palomar	NEAT	·	6.8 km	MPC · JPL
188347	2003 SN_{310}	—	September 28, 2003	Socorro	LINEAR	HYG	4.6 km	MPC · JPL
188348	2003 SQ_{319}	—	September 27, 2003	Apache Point	SDSS	HIL · 3:2	8.4 km	MPC · JPL
188349	2003 TS_{9}	—	October 14, 2003	Socorro	LINEAR	·	1.2 km	MPC · JPL
188350	2003 UA_{5}	—	October 17, 2003	Palomar	NEAT	H	1.1 km	MPC · JPL
188351	2003 WW_{1}	—	November 16, 2003	Catalina	CSS	HIL · 3:2 · (3561)	8.4 km	MPC · JPL
188352	2003 XT_{10}	—	December 3, 2003	Socorro	LINEAR	·	5.2 km	MPC · JPL
188353	2003 XN_{23}	—	December 1, 2003	Kitt Peak	Spacewatch	·	930 m	MPC · JPL
188354	2003 YJ_{16}	—	December 17, 2003	Anderson Mesa	LONEOS	·	1.6 km	MPC · JPL
188355	2003 YC_{43}	—	December 19, 2003	Kitt Peak	Spacewatch	·	1.1 km	MPC · JPL
188356	2003 YC_{50}	—	December 18, 2003	Socorro	LINEAR	·	1.0 km	MPC · JPL
188357	2003 YQ_{73}	—	December 18, 2003	Socorro	LINEAR	MAS	1.1 km	MPC · JPL
188358	2003 YL_{103}	—	December 20, 2003	Socorro	LINEAR	·	1.8 km	MPC · JPL
188359	2003 YC_{138}	—	December 27, 2003	Socorro	LINEAR	·	1.1 km	MPC · JPL
188360	2003 YA_{175}	—	December 19, 2003	Kitt Peak	Spacewatch	·	1.0 km	MPC · JPL
188361	2004 AN_{2}	—	January 13, 2004	Anderson Mesa	LONEOS	·	1.1 km	MPC · JPL
188362	2004 AT_{18}	—	January 15, 2004	Kitt Peak	Spacewatch	·	730 m	MPC · JPL
188363	2004 BJ_{6}	—	January 16, 2004	Kitt Peak	Spacewatch	·	970 m	MPC · JPL
188364	2004 BH_{23}	—	January 18, 2004	Palomar	NEAT	·	1.1 km	MPC · JPL
188365	2004 BF_{31}	—	January 18, 2004	Palomar	NEAT	·	1.4 km	MPC · JPL
188366	2004 BJ_{44}	—	January 22, 2004	Socorro	LINEAR	V	920 m	MPC · JPL
188367	2004 BC_{71}	—	January 22, 2004	Socorro	LINEAR	·	2.3 km	MPC · JPL
188368	2004 BS_{78}	—	January 22, 2004	Socorro	LINEAR	·	1.2 km	MPC · JPL
188369	2004 BX_{89}	—	January 23, 2004	Socorro	LINEAR	·	1.1 km	MPC · JPL
188370	2004 BJ_{100}	—	January 28, 2004	Socorro	LINEAR	·	1.5 km	MPC · JPL
188371	2004 BK_{101}	—	January 28, 2004	Socorro	LINEAR	·	820 m	MPC · JPL
188372	2004 BQ_{103}	—	January 31, 2004	Catalina	CSS	PHO	1.9 km	MPC · JPL
188373	2004 BZ_{132}	—	January 17, 2004	Kitt Peak	Spacewatch	L5	10 km	MPC · JPL
188374	2004 CW_{3}	—	February 10, 2004	Palomar	NEAT	·	1.2 km	MPC · JPL
188375	2004 CT_{6}	—	February 11, 2004	Anderson Mesa	LONEOS	NYS	1.0 km	MPC · JPL
188376	2004 CU_{12}	—	February 11, 2004	Palomar	NEAT	·	1.4 km	MPC · JPL
188377	2004 CD_{37}	—	February 12, 2004	Palomar	NEAT	·	1.7 km	MPC · JPL
188378	2004 CD_{59}	—	February 10, 2004	Palomar	NEAT	·	1.5 km	MPC · JPL
188379	2004 CA_{60}	—	February 11, 2004	Kitt Peak	Spacewatch	NYS	1.2 km	MPC · JPL
188380	2004 CE_{77}	—	February 11, 2004	Catalina	CSS	·	1.6 km	MPC · JPL
188381	2004 CD_{81}	—	February 12, 2004	Kitt Peak	Spacewatch	·	1.3 km	MPC · JPL
188382	2004 CX_{85}	—	February 14, 2004	Kitt Peak	Spacewatch	·	910 m	MPC · JPL
188383	2004 CO_{86}	—	February 14, 2004	Kitt Peak	Spacewatch	·	1.7 km	MPC · JPL
188384	2004 CK_{100}	—	February 15, 2004	Catalina	CSS	·	1.6 km	MPC · JPL
188385	2004 CX_{103}	—	February 13, 2004	Palomar	NEAT	·	1.3 km	MPC · JPL
188386	2004 CD_{111}	—	February 14, 2004	Kitt Peak	Spacewatch	NYS ·	2.4 km	MPC · JPL
188387	2004 CQ_{114}	—	February 15, 2004	Socorro	LINEAR	PHO	2.0 km	MPC · JPL
188388	2004 DW_{6}	—	February 16, 2004	Kitt Peak	Spacewatch	MAS	1.0 km	MPC · JPL
188389	2004 DF_{11}	—	February 16, 2004	Kitt Peak	Spacewatch	·	1.4 km	MPC · JPL
188390	2004 DP_{11}	—	February 17, 2004	Desert Eagle	W. K. Y. Yeung	·	1.3 km	MPC · JPL
188391	2004 DD_{17}	—	February 18, 2004	Kitt Peak	Spacewatch	·	990 m	MPC · JPL
188392	2004 DP_{20}	—	February 17, 2004	Socorro	LINEAR	ERI	1.9 km	MPC · JPL
188393	2004 DA_{21}	—	February 17, 2004	Socorro	LINEAR	·	1.6 km	MPC · JPL
188394	2004 DT_{34}	—	February 19, 2004	Socorro	LINEAR	WIT	1.5 km	MPC · JPL
188395	2004 DE_{50}	—	February 22, 2004	Kitt Peak	Spacewatch	V	830 m	MPC · JPL
188396	2004 DJ_{62}	—	February 26, 2004	Socorro	LINEAR	·	1.4 km	MPC · JPL
188397	2004 ET_{4}	—	March 11, 2004	Palomar	NEAT	V	930 m	MPC · JPL
188398	2004 EX_{6}	—	March 12, 2004	Palomar	NEAT	·	1.7 km	MPC · JPL
188399	2004 ER_{8}	—	March 13, 2004	Palomar	NEAT	·	2.0 km	MPC · JPL
188400	2004 ED_{12}	—	March 11, 2004	Palomar	NEAT	·	1.3 km	MPC · JPL

== 188401–188500 ==
back to top

Designation			Discovery			Properties		Ref
Permanent	Provisional	Named after	Date	Site	Discoverer(s)	Category	Diam.	Ref
188401	2004 EB_{21}	—	March 15, 2004	Socorro	LINEAR	MAS	910 m	MPC · JPL
188402	2004 EQ_{22}	—	March 15, 2004	Desert Eagle	W. K. Y. Yeung	MAS	940 m	MPC · JPL
188403	2004 EC_{44}	—	March 13, 2004	Palomar	NEAT	V	910 m	MPC · JPL
188404	2004 EM_{44}	—	March 14, 2004	Kitt Peak	Spacewatch	NYS	1.4 km	MPC · JPL
188405	2004 EP_{58}	—	March 15, 2004	Socorro	LINEAR	·	1.5 km	MPC · JPL
188406	2004 ET_{60}	—	March 12, 2004	Palomar	NEAT	·	1.1 km	MPC · JPL
188407	2004 EO_{70}	—	March 15, 2004	Kitt Peak	Spacewatch	·	1.4 km	MPC · JPL
188408	2004 EL_{71}	—	March 15, 2004	Catalina	CSS	·	1.6 km	MPC · JPL
188409	2004 EX_{73}	—	March 15, 2004	Campo Imperatore	CINEOS	·	1.4 km	MPC · JPL
188410	2004 EP_{75}	—	March 14, 2004	Kitt Peak	Spacewatch	·	1.6 km	MPC · JPL
188411	2004 ER_{77}	—	March 15, 2004	Socorro	LINEAR	·	1.2 km	MPC · JPL
188412	2004 EE_{78}	—	March 15, 2004	Catalina	CSS	NYS	1.6 km	MPC · JPL
188413	2004 EA_{81}	—	March 15, 2004	Socorro	LINEAR	·	1.9 km	MPC · JPL
188414	2004 EH_{103}	—	March 15, 2004	Kitt Peak	Spacewatch	·	2.4 km	MPC · JPL
188415	2004 FF	—	March 16, 2004	Desert Eagle	W. K. Y. Yeung	NYS	1.5 km	MPC · JPL
188416	2004 FU_{12}	—	March 16, 2004	Catalina	CSS	·	5.1 km	MPC · JPL
188417	2004 FO_{25}	—	March 17, 2004	Socorro	LINEAR	MAS	910 m	MPC · JPL
188418	2004 FZ_{37}	—	March 17, 2004	Kitt Peak	Spacewatch	MAS	960 m	MPC · JPL
188419	2004 FT_{45}	—	March 16, 2004	Kitt Peak	Spacewatch	·	1.9 km	MPC · JPL
188420	2004 FD_{50}	—	March 18, 2004	Socorro	LINEAR	·	1.3 km	MPC · JPL
188421	2004 FS_{52}	—	March 19, 2004	Socorro	LINEAR	·	1.4 km	MPC · JPL
188422	2004 FH_{58}	—	March 17, 2004	Socorro	LINEAR	·	1.8 km	MPC · JPL
188423	2004 FF_{65}	—	March 19, 2004	Socorro	LINEAR	·	1.9 km	MPC · JPL
188424	2004 FS_{80}	—	March 22, 2004	Socorro	LINEAR	NYS	1.4 km	MPC · JPL
188425	2004 FC_{82}	—	March 17, 2004	Kitt Peak	Spacewatch	·	1.9 km	MPC · JPL
188426	2004 FX_{84}	—	March 18, 2004	Socorro	LINEAR	V	1.3 km	MPC · JPL
188427	2004 FX_{85}	—	March 19, 2004	Palomar	NEAT	(2076)	1.1 km	MPC · JPL
188428	2004 FU_{86}	—	March 19, 2004	Palomar	NEAT	·	1.3 km	MPC · JPL
188429	2004 FW_{87}	—	March 19, 2004	Socorro	LINEAR	·	1.3 km	MPC · JPL
188430	2004 FC_{91}	—	March 21, 2004	Kitt Peak	Spacewatch	·	2.0 km	MPC · JPL
188431	2004 FF_{91}	—	March 21, 2004	Kitt Peak	Spacewatch	V	1.0 km	MPC · JPL
188432	2004 FF_{94}	—	March 22, 2004	Socorro	LINEAR	·	1.4 km	MPC · JPL
188433	2004 FV_{101}	—	March 24, 2004	Anderson Mesa	LONEOS	·	1.4 km	MPC · JPL
188434	2004 FQ_{108}	—	March 23, 2004	Kitt Peak	Spacewatch	MAS	1.0 km	MPC · JPL
188435	2004 FY_{117}	—	March 22, 2004	Socorro	LINEAR	V	830 m	MPC · JPL
188436	2004 FS_{131}	—	March 23, 2004	Kitt Peak	Spacewatch	·	1.2 km	MPC · JPL
188437	2004 FN_{134}	—	March 26, 2004	Socorro	LINEAR	·	1.5 km	MPC · JPL
188438	2004 FF_{135}	—	March 27, 2004	Socorro	LINEAR	·	1.4 km	MPC · JPL
188439	2004 FK_{140}	—	March 27, 2004	Kitt Peak	Spacewatch	·	1.8 km	MPC · JPL
188440	2004 FW_{156}	—	March 17, 2004	Kitt Peak	Spacewatch	·	1.0 km	MPC · JPL
188441	2004 GF_{17}	—	April 10, 2004	Palomar	NEAT	PHO	1.5 km	MPC · JPL
188442	2004 GM_{21}	—	April 11, 2004	Catalina	CSS	·	2.3 km	MPC · JPL
188443	2004 GA_{34}	—	April 12, 2004	Palomar	NEAT	·	1.9 km	MPC · JPL
188444	2004 GN_{47}	—	April 12, 2004	Kitt Peak	Spacewatch	·	2.9 km	MPC · JPL
188445	2004 HB_{5}	—	April 16, 2004	Palomar	NEAT	·	1.7 km	MPC · JPL
188446 Louischevrolet	2004 HY_{5}	Louischevrolet	April 17, 2004	Nogales	M. Ory	·	1.8 km	MPC · JPL
188447	2004 HP_{12}	—	April 19, 2004	Socorro	LINEAR	MAS	990 m	MPC · JPL
188448	2004 HW_{35}	—	April 20, 2004	Siding Spring	SSS	·	2.0 km	MPC · JPL
188449	2004 HV_{41}	—	April 20, 2004	Kitt Peak	Spacewatch	·	1.7 km	MPC · JPL
188450	2004 HB_{55}	—	April 22, 2004	Siding Spring	SSS	·	2.3 km	MPC · JPL
188451	2004 HR_{59}	—	April 25, 2004	Socorro	LINEAR	·	1.9 km	MPC · JPL
188452	2004 HE_{62}	—	April 26, 2004	Siding Spring	SSS	AMO +1km	1.1 km	MPC · JPL
188453	2004 HK_{78}	—	April 28, 2004	Kitt Peak	Spacewatch	·	1.9 km	MPC · JPL
188454	2004 JK_{5}	—	May 12, 2004	Nogales	M. Schwartz, P. R. Holvorcem	·	3.0 km	MPC · JPL
188455	2004 JC_{11}	—	May 12, 2004	Catalina	CSS	EUN	2.0 km	MPC · JPL
188456	2004 JS_{11}	—	May 12, 2004	Socorro	LINEAR	·	3.6 km	MPC · JPL
188457	2004 JR_{15}	—	May 10, 2004	Palomar	NEAT	·	3.3 km	MPC · JPL
188458	2004 JU_{16}	—	May 11, 2004	Anderson Mesa	LONEOS	·	1.2 km	MPC · JPL
188459	2004 JR_{22}	—	May 10, 2004	Palomar	NEAT	·	3.3 km	MPC · JPL
188460	2004 JP_{26}	—	May 15, 2004	Socorro	LINEAR	·	1.8 km	MPC · JPL
188461	2004 JH_{30}	—	May 15, 2004	Socorro	LINEAR	NYS	1.5 km	MPC · JPL
188462	2004 JG_{34}	—	May 15, 2004	Socorro	LINEAR	·	1.4 km	MPC · JPL
188463	2004 JD_{35}	—	May 15, 2004	Socorro	LINEAR	·	1.8 km	MPC · JPL
188464	2004 JB_{45}	—	May 15, 2004	Bergisch Gladbach	W. Bickel	·	2.2 km	MPC · JPL
188465	2004 KH_{9}	—	May 18, 2004	Socorro	LINEAR	·	3.6 km	MPC · JPL
188466	2004 KG_{11}	—	May 19, 2004	Campo Imperatore	CINEOS	KON	3.5 km	MPC · JPL
188467	2004 LL_{3}	—	June 11, 2004	Socorro	LINEAR	·	2.8 km	MPC · JPL
188468	2004 LM_{8}	—	June 12, 2004	Campo Imperatore	CINEOS	·	2.3 km	MPC · JPL
188469	2004 LY_{9}	—	June 12, 2004	Socorro	LINEAR	RAF	1.6 km	MPC · JPL
188470	2004 LN_{13}	—	June 11, 2004	Socorro	LINEAR	·	2.0 km	MPC · JPL
188471	2004 LS_{13}	—	June 11, 2004	Socorro	LINEAR	·	2.2 km	MPC · JPL
188472	2004 LV_{24}	—	June 14, 2004	Kitt Peak	Spacewatch	·	3.5 km	MPC · JPL
188473	2004 LC_{27}	—	June 12, 2004	Socorro	LINEAR	·	4.0 km	MPC · JPL
188474	2004 NT_{3}	—	July 9, 2004	Palomar	NEAT	·	2.4 km	MPC · JPL
188475	2004 NW_{4}	—	July 9, 2004	Palomar	NEAT	·	2.7 km	MPC · JPL
188476	2004 NX_{4}	—	July 9, 2004	Palomar	NEAT	KON	4.0 km	MPC · JPL
188477	2004 NP_{12}	—	July 11, 2004	Socorro	LINEAR	AGN	1.9 km	MPC · JPL
188478	2004 NO_{13}	—	July 11, 2004	Socorro	LINEAR	·	3.1 km	MPC · JPL
188479	2004 NN_{24}	—	July 15, 2004	Socorro	LINEAR	EUN	1.7 km	MPC · JPL
188480	2004 NL_{29}	—	July 14, 2004	Socorro	LINEAR	·	3.4 km	MPC · JPL
188481	2004 OG_{5}	—	July 16, 2004	Socorro	LINEAR	·	2.8 km	MPC · JPL
188482	2004 OC_{9}	—	July 19, 2004	Anderson Mesa	LONEOS	·	2.9 km	MPC · JPL
188483	2004 PP_{4}	—	August 5, 2004	Palomar	NEAT	·	2.7 km	MPC · JPL
188484	2004 PJ_{6}	—	August 6, 2004	Palomar	NEAT	·	1.7 km	MPC · JPL
188485	2004 PM_{10}	—	August 6, 2004	Campo Imperatore	CINEOS	AGN	2.0 km	MPC · JPL
188486	2004 PM_{12}	—	August 7, 2004	Palomar	NEAT	·	2.4 km	MPC · JPL
188487	2004 PB_{22}	—	August 8, 2004	Socorro	LINEAR	MRX	1.5 km	MPC · JPL
188488	2004 PT_{24}	—	August 8, 2004	Socorro	LINEAR	AGN	1.8 km	MPC · JPL
188489	2004 PH_{30}	—	August 8, 2004	Campo Imperatore	CINEOS	·	3.2 km	MPC · JPL
188490	2004 PH_{34}	—	August 8, 2004	Anderson Mesa	LONEOS	·	2.3 km	MPC · JPL
188491	2004 PR_{34}	—	August 8, 2004	Anderson Mesa	LONEOS	GEF	1.7 km	MPC · JPL
188492	2004 PU_{35}	—	August 8, 2004	Anderson Mesa	LONEOS	·	4.2 km	MPC · JPL
188493	2004 PH_{48}	—	August 8, 2004	Socorro	LINEAR	HOF	4.0 km	MPC · JPL
188494	2004 PO_{50}	—	August 8, 2004	Socorro	LINEAR	·	1.7 km	MPC · JPL
188495	2004 PM_{66}	—	August 10, 2004	Campo Imperatore	CINEOS	·	1.9 km	MPC · JPL
188496	2004 PF_{75}	—	August 8, 2004	Anderson Mesa	LONEOS	THM	3.0 km	MPC · JPL
188497	2004 PO_{75}	—	August 8, 2004	Anderson Mesa	LONEOS	JUN	2.0 km	MPC · JPL
188498	2004 PM_{83}	—	August 10, 2004	Socorro	LINEAR	BRA	2.1 km	MPC · JPL
188499	2004 PT_{90}	—	August 10, 2004	Socorro	LINEAR	(58892)	5.2 km	MPC · JPL
188500	2004 PA_{98}	—	August 14, 2004	Reedy Creek	J. Broughton	·	3.9 km	MPC · JPL

== 188501–188600 ==
back to top

Designation			Discovery			Properties		Ref
Permanent	Provisional	Named after	Date	Site	Discoverer(s)	Category	Diam.	Ref
188501	2004 PD_{101}	—	August 11, 2004	Socorro	LINEAR	·	4.9 km	MPC · JPL
188502 Darrellstrobel	2004 PM_{115}	Darrellstrobel	August 12, 2004	Cerro Tololo	M. W. Buie	THM	2.6 km	MPC · JPL
188503	2004 QU_{18}	—	August 21, 2004	Catalina	CSS	KOR	2.3 km	MPC · JPL
188504	2004 QZ_{19}	—	August 22, 2004	Goodricke-Pigott	Goodricke-Pigott	·	5.4 km	MPC · JPL
188505	2004 QV_{26}	—	August 19, 2004	Siding Spring	SSS	·	3.1 km	MPC · JPL
188506 Roulet	2004 RR_{1}	Roulet	September 5, 2004	Vicques	M. Ory	·	3.4 km	MPC · JPL
188507	2004 RF_{6}	—	September 4, 2004	Palomar	NEAT	·	3.2 km	MPC · JPL
188508	2004 RK_{21}	—	September 7, 2004	Kitt Peak	Spacewatch	·	3.7 km	MPC · JPL
188509	2004 RR_{36}	—	September 7, 2004	Socorro	LINEAR	·	5.5 km	MPC · JPL
188510	2004 RG_{38}	—	September 7, 2004	Socorro	LINEAR	DOR	4.5 km	MPC · JPL
188511	2004 RR_{41}	—	September 7, 2004	Kitt Peak	Spacewatch	·	3.0 km	MPC · JPL
188512	2004 RD_{43}	—	September 8, 2004	Socorro	LINEAR	·	4.3 km	MPC · JPL
188513	2004 RK_{47}	—	September 8, 2004	Socorro	LINEAR	(159)	4.2 km	MPC · JPL
188514	2004 RW_{50}	—	September 8, 2004	Socorro	LINEAR	EOS	3.0 km	MPC · JPL
188515	2004 RC_{53}	—	September 8, 2004	Socorro	LINEAR	·	3.3 km	MPC · JPL
188516	2004 RV_{54}	—	September 8, 2004	Socorro	LINEAR	EOS	3.3 km	MPC · JPL
188517	2004 RP_{57}	—	September 8, 2004	Socorro	LINEAR	TIR	3.1 km	MPC · JPL
188518	2004 RR_{72}	—	September 8, 2004	Socorro	LINEAR	·	3.1 km	MPC · JPL
188519	2004 RT_{72}	—	September 8, 2004	Socorro	LINEAR	(31811)	4.4 km	MPC · JPL
188520	2004 RU_{75}	—	September 8, 2004	Socorro	LINEAR	·	3.1 km	MPC · JPL
188521	2004 RT_{88}	—	September 8, 2004	Socorro	LINEAR	·	3.4 km	MPC · JPL
188522	2004 RY_{91}	—	September 8, 2004	Socorro	LINEAR	·	4.3 km	MPC · JPL
188523	2004 RF_{99}	—	September 8, 2004	Socorro	LINEAR	URS	6.2 km	MPC · JPL
188524	2004 RG_{100}	—	September 8, 2004	Socorro	LINEAR	·	5.0 km	MPC · JPL
188525	2004 RM_{106}	—	September 8, 2004	Palomar	NEAT	·	3.1 km	MPC · JPL
188526	2004 RR_{123}	—	September 7, 2004	Palomar	NEAT	·	5.7 km	MPC · JPL
188527	2004 RG_{124}	—	September 7, 2004	Socorro	LINEAR	·	2.9 km	MPC · JPL
188528	2004 RR_{148}	—	September 9, 2004	Socorro	LINEAR	·	3.0 km	MPC · JPL
188529	2004 RB_{153}	—	September 10, 2004	Socorro	LINEAR	EOS	2.9 km	MPC · JPL
188530	2004 RU_{155}	—	September 10, 2004	Socorro	LINEAR	·	3.6 km	MPC · JPL
188531	2004 RQ_{177}	—	September 10, 2004	Socorro	LINEAR	·	4.6 km	MPC · JPL
188532	2004 RS_{199}	—	September 10, 2004	Socorro	LINEAR	·	4.7 km	MPC · JPL
188533	2004 RC_{242}	—	September 10, 2004	Kitt Peak	Spacewatch	THM	3.0 km	MPC · JPL
188534 Mauna Kea	2004 RA_{252}	Mauna Kea	September 15, 2004	Mauna Kea	Pittichová, J., Bedient, J.	·	2.5 km	MPC · JPL
188535	2004 RW_{253}	—	September 6, 2004	Palomar	NEAT	·	4.1 km	MPC · JPL
188536	2004 RL_{291}	—	September 10, 2004	Socorro	LINEAR	·	6.3 km	MPC · JPL
188537	2004 RX_{291}	—	September 10, 2004	Socorro	LINEAR	·	5.0 km	MPC · JPL
188538	2004 RK_{307}	—	September 13, 2004	Socorro	LINEAR	·	5.3 km	MPC · JPL
188539	2004 RX_{315}	—	September 15, 2004	Siding Spring	SSS	·	4.6 km	MPC · JPL
188540	2004 RZ_{320}	—	September 13, 2004	Socorro	LINEAR	·	6.2 km	MPC · JPL
188541	2004 RV_{337}	—	September 15, 2004	Kitt Peak	Spacewatch	THM	3.8 km	MPC · JPL
188542	2004 RF_{339}	—	September 15, 2004	Anderson Mesa	LONEOS	·	3.5 km	MPC · JPL
188543	2004 RN_{339}	—	September 7, 2004	Socorro	LINEAR	·	6.8 km	MPC · JPL
188544	2004 SC_{13}	—	September 17, 2004	Socorro	LINEAR	(13314)	4.2 km	MPC · JPL
188545	2004 SD_{17}	—	September 17, 2004	Anderson Mesa	LONEOS	·	4.3 km	MPC · JPL
188546	2004 SQ_{29}	—	September 17, 2004	Socorro	LINEAR	CYB	7.4 km	MPC · JPL
188547	2004 ST_{36}	—	September 17, 2004	Kitt Peak	Spacewatch	·	3.8 km	MPC · JPL
188548	2004 SW_{39}	—	September 17, 2004	Socorro	LINEAR	·	4.9 km	MPC · JPL
188549	2004 ST_{59}	—	September 17, 2004	Anderson Mesa	LONEOS	CYB	6.7 km	MPC · JPL
188550	2004 TM_{2}	—	October 4, 2004	Kitt Peak	Spacewatch	·	3.2 km	MPC · JPL
188551	2004 TN_{2}	—	October 4, 2004	Kitt Peak	Spacewatch	VER	5.0 km	MPC · JPL
188552	2004 TB_{14}	—	October 9, 2004	Goodricke-Pigott	Goodricke-Pigott	·	5.1 km	MPC · JPL
188553	2004 TZ_{16}	—	October 10, 2004	Socorro	LINEAR	·	6.9 km	MPC · JPL
188554	2004 TE_{37}	—	October 4, 2004	Kitt Peak	Spacewatch	·	2.7 km	MPC · JPL
188555	2004 TA_{62}	—	October 5, 2004	Anderson Mesa	LONEOS	·	6.0 km	MPC · JPL
188556	2004 TD_{62}	—	October 5, 2004	Anderson Mesa	LONEOS	·	4.8 km	MPC · JPL
188557	2004 TE_{62}	—	October 5, 2004	Anderson Mesa	LONEOS	·	3.2 km	MPC · JPL
188558	2004 TF_{67}	—	October 5, 2004	Anderson Mesa	LONEOS	·	7.2 km	MPC · JPL
188559	2004 TJ_{69}	—	October 5, 2004	Anderson Mesa	LONEOS	HOF	5.2 km	MPC · JPL
188560	2004 TG_{72}	—	October 6, 2004	Kitt Peak	Spacewatch	·	3.6 km	MPC · JPL
188561	2004 TL_{79}	—	October 4, 2004	Socorro	LINEAR	·	6.5 km	MPC · JPL
188562	2004 TA_{118}	—	October 5, 2004	Anderson Mesa	LONEOS	·	4.5 km	MPC · JPL
188563	2004 TZ_{118}	—	October 6, 2004	Anderson Mesa	LONEOS	(31811)	6.0 km	MPC · JPL
188564	2004 TO_{120}	—	October 6, 2004	Palomar	NEAT	·	5.2 km	MPC · JPL
188565	2004 TR_{122}	—	October 7, 2004	Anderson Mesa	LONEOS	·	5.3 km	MPC · JPL
188566	2004 TD_{124}	—	October 7, 2004	Socorro	LINEAR	·	2.7 km	MPC · JPL
188567	2004 TM_{127}	—	October 7, 2004	Socorro	LINEAR	·	5.9 km	MPC · JPL
188568	2004 TL_{221}	—	October 7, 2004	Socorro	LINEAR	·	6.7 km	MPC · JPL
188569	2004 TO_{301}	—	October 8, 2004	Anderson Mesa	LONEOS	·	3.0 km	MPC · JPL
188570	2004 TR_{341}	—	October 13, 2004	Kitt Peak	Spacewatch	·	6.1 km	MPC · JPL
188571	2004 UD_{7}	—	October 21, 2004	Socorro	LINEAR	·	6.2 km	MPC · JPL
188572	2004 VW_{62}	—	November 7, 2004	Socorro	LINEAR	·	4.1 km	MPC · JPL
188573	2004 XL_{126}	—	December 13, 2004	Catalina	CSS	·	5.1 km	MPC · JPL
188574	2004 YC_{22}	—	December 18, 2004	Mount Lemmon	Mount Lemmon Survey	L5	10 km	MPC · JPL
188575	2005 CF_{23}	—	February 1, 2005	Catalina	CSS	H	1.1 km	MPC · JPL
188576 Kosenda	2005 EL_{30}	Kosenda	March 5, 2005	Kitami	K. Endate	H	870 m	MPC · JPL
188577	2005 GM_{1}	—	April 2, 2005	Catalina	CSS	H	910 m	MPC · JPL
188578	2005 GV_{2}	—	April 1, 2005	Anderson Mesa	LONEOS	·	1.0 km	MPC · JPL
188579	2005 GW_{39}	—	April 4, 2005	Mount Lemmon	Mount Lemmon Survey	·	1.9 km	MPC · JPL
188580	2005 GV_{179}	—	April 5, 2005	Palomar	NEAT	H	1.0 km	MPC · JPL
188581	2005 JX_{119}	—	May 10, 2005	Kitt Peak	Spacewatch	·	1.1 km	MPC · JPL
188582	2005 LV_{28}	—	June 10, 2005	Kitt Peak	Spacewatch	·	1.5 km	MPC · JPL
188583	2005 MU_{5}	—	June 21, 2005	Palomar	NEAT	·	790 m	MPC · JPL
188584	2005 MT_{37}	—	June 30, 2005	Kitt Peak	Spacewatch	·	1.3 km	MPC · JPL
188585	2005 MF_{41}	—	June 30, 2005	Palomar	NEAT	(2076)	1.1 km	MPC · JPL
188586	2005 NX_{16}	—	July 2, 2005	Kitt Peak	Spacewatch	·	830 m	MPC · JPL
188587	2005 NP_{22}	—	July 1, 2005	Kitt Peak	Spacewatch	·	1.7 km	MPC · JPL
188588	2005 NP_{29}	—	July 8, 2005	Wrightwood	J. W. Young	·	1.4 km	MPC · JPL
188589	2005 NG_{39}	—	July 6, 2005	Reedy Creek	J. Broughton	·	1.1 km	MPC · JPL
188590	2005 NU_{43}	—	July 6, 2005	Kitt Peak	Spacewatch	V	820 m	MPC · JPL
188591	2005 NJ_{44}	—	July 9, 2005	Kitt Peak	Spacewatch	·	1.0 km	MPC · JPL
188592	2005 NS_{48}	—	July 8, 2005	Kitt Peak	Spacewatch	·	2.2 km	MPC · JPL
188593	2005 OF_{6}	—	July 28, 2005	Palomar	NEAT	·	2.1 km	MPC · JPL
188594	2005 OK_{6}	—	July 28, 2005	Palomar	NEAT	·	2.2 km	MPC · JPL
188595	2005 OL_{7}	—	July 29, 2005	Palomar	NEAT	·	1.8 km	MPC · JPL
188596	2005 OL_{9}	—	July 27, 2005	Palomar	NEAT	·	860 m	MPC · JPL
188597	2005 OK_{11}	—	July 28, 2005	Palomar	NEAT	·	1.1 km	MPC · JPL
188598	2005 OF_{15}	—	July 29, 2005	Reedy Creek	J. Broughton	·	2.5 km	MPC · JPL
188599	2005 OW_{15}	—	July 29, 2005	Palomar	NEAT	·	2.1 km	MPC · JPL
188600	2005 PC_{3}	—	August 2, 2005	Socorro	LINEAR	NYS	2.0 km	MPC · JPL

== 188601–188700 ==
back to top

Designation			Discovery			Properties		Ref
Permanent	Provisional	Named after	Date	Site	Discoverer(s)	Category	Diam.	Ref
188601	2005 PL_{3}	—	August 4, 2005	Palomar	NEAT	·	1.3 km	MPC · JPL
188602	2005 PP_{12}	—	August 4, 2005	Palomar	NEAT	V	910 m	MPC · JPL
188603	2005 PJ_{13}	—	August 4, 2005	Palomar	NEAT	·	2.0 km	MPC · JPL
188604	2005 PO_{13}	—	August 4, 2005	Palomar	NEAT	(5)	1.7 km	MPC · JPL
188605	2005 PK_{16}	—	August 5, 2005	Palomar	NEAT	·	1.0 km	MPC · JPL
188606	2005 PH_{18}	—	August 10, 2005	Reedy Creek	J. Broughton	(2076)	1.0 km	MPC · JPL
188607	2005 PR_{20}	—	August 15, 2005	Siding Spring	SSS	·	1.1 km	MPC · JPL
188608	2005 QO_{2}	—	August 24, 2005	Palomar	NEAT	·	1.6 km	MPC · JPL
188609	2005 QX_{2}	—	August 24, 2005	Palomar	NEAT	·	1.8 km	MPC · JPL
188610	2005 QN_{4}	—	August 24, 2005	Palomar	NEAT	·	1.3 km	MPC · JPL
188611	2005 QW_{4}	—	August 24, 2005	Haleakala	NEAT	·	1.4 km	MPC · JPL
188612	2005 QL_{8}	—	August 25, 2005	Palomar	NEAT	MRX	1.5 km	MPC · JPL
188613	2005 QK_{13}	—	August 24, 2005	Palomar	NEAT	·	2.4 km	MPC · JPL
188614	2005 QR_{17}	—	August 25, 2005	Palomar	NEAT	NYS	1.3 km	MPC · JPL
188615	2005 QS_{17}	—	August 25, 2005	Palomar	NEAT	·	1.6 km	MPC · JPL
188616	2005 QW_{18}	—	August 25, 2005	Palomar	NEAT	·	880 m	MPC · JPL
188617	2005 QN_{26}	—	August 27, 2005	Kitt Peak	Spacewatch	MAR	1.3 km	MPC · JPL
188618	2005 QE_{27}	—	August 27, 2005	Kitt Peak	Spacewatch	·	2.6 km	MPC · JPL
188619	2005 QL_{29}	—	August 26, 2005	Palomar	NEAT	·	920 m	MPC · JPL
188620	2005 QX_{29}	—	August 26, 2005	Anderson Mesa	LONEOS	·	3.4 km	MPC · JPL
188621	2005 QZ_{32}	—	August 25, 2005	Palomar	NEAT	NYS	1.8 km	MPC · JPL
188622	2005 QC_{34}	—	August 25, 2005	Palomar	NEAT	·	1.3 km	MPC · JPL
188623	2005 QZ_{35}	—	August 25, 2005	Palomar	NEAT	·	1.5 km	MPC · JPL
188624	2005 QX_{41}	—	August 26, 2005	Anderson Mesa	LONEOS	·	1.7 km	MPC · JPL
188625	2005 QX_{42}	—	August 26, 2005	Anderson Mesa	LONEOS	·	990 m	MPC · JPL
188626	2005 QV_{45}	—	August 26, 2005	Palomar	NEAT	(5)	1.8 km	MPC · JPL
188627	2005 QS_{49}	—	August 26, 2005	Palomar	NEAT	·	1.8 km	MPC · JPL
188628	2005 QS_{54}	—	August 28, 2005	Kitt Peak	Spacewatch	·	1.9 km	MPC · JPL
188629	2005 QL_{56}	—	August 28, 2005	Kitt Peak	Spacewatch	·	3.3 km	MPC · JPL
188630	2005 QD_{69}	—	August 28, 2005	Siding Spring	SSS	·	1.2 km	MPC · JPL
188631	2005 QX_{69}	—	August 29, 2005	Socorro	LINEAR	V	880 m	MPC · JPL
188632	2005 QG_{77}	—	August 24, 2005	Palomar	NEAT	·	1.7 km	MPC · JPL
188633	2005 QT_{80}	—	August 28, 2005	Anderson Mesa	LONEOS	·	1.6 km	MPC · JPL
188634	2005 QX_{80}	—	August 28, 2005	Haleakala	NEAT	·	2.1 km	MPC · JPL
188635	2005 QA_{82}	—	August 29, 2005	Socorro	LINEAR	·	990 m	MPC · JPL
188636	2005 QL_{82}	—	August 29, 2005	Socorro	LINEAR	·	2.2 km	MPC · JPL
188637	2005 QX_{91}	—	August 26, 2005	Anderson Mesa	LONEOS	NYS	2.4 km	MPC · JPL
188638	2005 QG_{99}	—	August 27, 2005	Palomar	NEAT	·	2.4 km	MPC · JPL
188639	2005 QP_{114}	—	August 27, 2005	Palomar	NEAT	·	2.1 km	MPC · JPL
188640	2005 QT_{117}	—	August 28, 2005	Kitt Peak	Spacewatch	·	1.4 km	MPC · JPL
188641	2005 QB_{162}	—	August 28, 2005	Siding Spring	SSS	·	2.1 km	MPC · JPL
188642	2005 QL_{178}	—	August 26, 2005	Palomar	NEAT	·	2.5 km	MPC · JPL
188643	2005 RA_{15}	—	September 1, 2005	Kitt Peak	Spacewatch	AGN	1.3 km	MPC · JPL
188644	2005 RJ_{22}	—	September 8, 2005	Socorro	LINEAR	·	1.4 km	MPC · JPL
188645	2005 RL_{33}	—	September 14, 2005	Catalina	CSS	·	2.2 km	MPC · JPL
188646	2005 RF_{43}	—	September 14, 2005	Kitt Peak	Spacewatch	·	1.4 km	MPC · JPL
188647	2005 SY_{3}	—	September 24, 2005	Kitt Peak	Spacewatch	AGN	1.8 km	MPC · JPL
188648	2005 SD_{4}	—	September 24, 2005	Kitt Peak	Spacewatch	·	1.9 km	MPC · JPL
188649	2005 SS_{26}	—	September 23, 2005	Kitt Peak	Spacewatch	·	1.9 km	MPC · JPL
188650	2005 SH_{35}	—	September 23, 2005	Kitt Peak	Spacewatch	·	2.2 km	MPC · JPL
188651	2005 SS_{36}	—	September 24, 2005	Kitt Peak	Spacewatch	·	2.9 km	MPC · JPL
188652	2005 SZ_{43}	—	September 24, 2005	Kitt Peak	Spacewatch	·	1.7 km	MPC · JPL
188653	2005 SH_{59}	—	September 26, 2005	Kitt Peak	Spacewatch	·	1.8 km	MPC · JPL
188654	2005 SG_{62}	—	September 26, 2005	Kitt Peak	Spacewatch	·	3.7 km	MPC · JPL
188655	2005 SR_{62}	—	September 26, 2005	Kitt Peak	Spacewatch	·	1.7 km	MPC · JPL
188656	2005 SV_{69}	—	September 27, 2005	Kitt Peak	Spacewatch	·	1.9 km	MPC · JPL
188657	2005 SU_{71}	—	September 23, 2005	Catalina	CSS	·	960 m	MPC · JPL
188658	2005 ST_{84}	—	September 24, 2005	Kitt Peak	Spacewatch	·	1.2 km	MPC · JPL
188659	2005 SQ_{92}	—	September 24, 2005	Kitt Peak	Spacewatch	·	2.3 km	MPC · JPL
188660	2005 SB_{93}	—	September 24, 2005	Kitt Peak	Spacewatch	NYS	1.4 km	MPC · JPL
188661	2005 SY_{96}	—	September 25, 2005	Palomar	NEAT	·	2.2 km	MPC · JPL
188662	2005 SW_{103}	—	September 25, 2005	Palomar	NEAT	EUN	2.3 km	MPC · JPL
188663	2005 SC_{105}	—	September 25, 2005	Palomar	NEAT	·	1.9 km	MPC · JPL
188664	2005 SD_{109}	—	September 26, 2005	Kitt Peak	Spacewatch	MAS	880 m	MPC · JPL
188665	2005 SJ_{119}	—	September 28, 2005	Palomar	NEAT	·	1.2 km	MPC · JPL
188666	2005 SP_{126}	—	September 29, 2005	Mount Lemmon	Mount Lemmon Survey	EOS	2.2 km	MPC · JPL
188667	2005 SD_{132}	—	September 29, 2005	Kitt Peak	Spacewatch	·	5.3 km	MPC · JPL
188668	2005 SW_{134}	—	September 29, 2005	Mount Lemmon	Mount Lemmon Survey	·	4.6 km	MPC · JPL
188669	2005 SK_{140}	—	September 25, 2005	Kitt Peak	Spacewatch	MAS	810 m	MPC · JPL
188670	2005 SP_{146}	—	September 25, 2005	Kitt Peak	Spacewatch	·	1.2 km	MPC · JPL
188671	2005 SK_{147}	—	September 25, 2005	Kitt Peak	Spacewatch	·	2.5 km	MPC · JPL
188672	2005 SK_{151}	—	September 25, 2005	Kitt Peak	Spacewatch	KOR	1.8 km	MPC · JPL
188673	2005 SS_{163}	—	September 27, 2005	Palomar	NEAT	·	4.2 km	MPC · JPL
188674	2005 SA_{186}	—	September 29, 2005	Palomar	NEAT	MAS	1.1 km	MPC · JPL
188675	2005 SY_{201}	—	September 30, 2005	Palomar	NEAT	HNS	1.8 km	MPC · JPL
188676	2005 SR_{203}	—	September 30, 2005	Anderson Mesa	LONEOS	·	1.3 km	MPC · JPL
188677	2005 SV_{210}	—	September 30, 2005	Palomar	NEAT	NYS	1.4 km	MPC · JPL
188678	2005 SZ_{212}	—	September 30, 2005	Mount Lemmon	Mount Lemmon Survey	AGN	1.5 km	MPC · JPL
188679	2005 SE_{213}	—	September 30, 2005	Mount Lemmon	Mount Lemmon Survey	·	3.5 km	MPC · JPL
188680	2005 SU_{216}	—	September 30, 2005	Palomar	NEAT	GEF	2.1 km	MPC · JPL
188681	2005 SY_{220}	—	September 29, 2005	Catalina	CSS	·	2.4 km	MPC · JPL
188682	2005 SZ_{230}	—	September 30, 2005	Mount Lemmon	Mount Lemmon Survey	·	2.3 km	MPC · JPL
188683	2005 SC_{233}	—	September 30, 2005	Mount Lemmon	Mount Lemmon Survey	·	2.9 km	MPC · JPL
188684	2005 SA_{236}	—	September 29, 2005	Kitt Peak	Spacewatch	·	3.0 km	MPC · JPL
188685	2005 SA_{241}	—	September 30, 2005	Kitt Peak	Spacewatch	·	2.2 km	MPC · JPL
188686	2005 SM_{245}	—	September 30, 2005	Mount Lemmon	Mount Lemmon Survey	·	2.3 km	MPC · JPL
188687	2005 ST_{250}	—	September 23, 2005	Catalina	CSS	·	1.1 km	MPC · JPL
188688	2005 SX_{271}	—	September 27, 2005	Kitt Peak	Spacewatch	·	1.9 km	MPC · JPL
188689	2005 SF_{279}	—	September 29, 2005	Mount Lemmon	Mount Lemmon Survey	HOF	2.8 km	MPC · JPL
188690	2005 TK	—	October 1, 2005	Greiner Research	Mills, M.	·	1.4 km	MPC · JPL
188691	2005 TT_{7}	—	October 1, 2005	Kitt Peak	Spacewatch	·	1.5 km	MPC · JPL
188692	2005 TR_{11}	—	October 1, 2005	Mount Lemmon	Mount Lemmon Survey	AGN	1.7 km	MPC · JPL
188693 Roosevelt	2005 TO_{14}	Roosevelt	October 3, 2005	Catalina	CSS	·	1.7 km	MPC · JPL
188694	2005 TJ_{18}	—	October 1, 2005	Socorro	LINEAR	·	910 m	MPC · JPL
188695	2005 TC_{24}	—	October 1, 2005	Socorro	LINEAR	(5)	1.8 km	MPC · JPL
188696	2005 TG_{24}	—	October 1, 2005	Mount Lemmon	Mount Lemmon Survey	·	4.1 km	MPC · JPL
188697	2005 TJ_{26}	—	October 1, 2005	Mount Lemmon	Mount Lemmon Survey	·	1.9 km	MPC · JPL
188698	2005 TF_{27}	—	October 1, 2005	Mount Lemmon	Mount Lemmon Survey	·	1.8 km	MPC · JPL
188699	2005 TQ_{31}	—	October 1, 2005	Kitt Peak	Spacewatch	·	2.2 km	MPC · JPL
188700	2005 TM_{39}	—	October 1, 2005	Kitt Peak	Spacewatch	HOF	3.0 km	MPC · JPL

== 188701–188800 ==
back to top

Designation			Discovery			Properties		Ref
Permanent	Provisional	Named after	Date	Site	Discoverer(s)	Category	Diam.	Ref
188701	2005 TD_{50}	—	October 3, 2005	Goodricke-Pigott	R. A. Tucker	·	2.4 km	MPC · JPL
188702	2005 TR_{58}	—	October 1, 2005	Mount Lemmon	Mount Lemmon Survey	AST	2.1 km	MPC · JPL
188703	2005 TA_{60}	—	October 2, 2005	Mount Lemmon	Mount Lemmon Survey	AGN	1.5 km	MPC · JPL
188704	2005 TB_{64}	—	October 6, 2005	Catalina	CSS	·	2.4 km	MPC · JPL
188705	2005 TE_{77}	—	October 6, 2005	Anderson Mesa	LONEOS	·	2.2 km	MPC · JPL
188706	2005 TR_{90}	—	October 6, 2005	Mount Lemmon	Mount Lemmon Survey	·	2.0 km	MPC · JPL
188707	2005 TD_{98}	—	October 6, 2005	Kitt Peak	Spacewatch	·	2.2 km	MPC · JPL
188708	2005 TR_{99}	—	October 7, 2005	Socorro	LINEAR	·	1.3 km	MPC · JPL
188709	2005 TG_{101}	—	October 7, 2005	Catalina	CSS	ERI	3.1 km	MPC · JPL
188710	2005 TR_{101}	—	October 7, 2005	Catalina	CSS	·	1.2 km	MPC · JPL
188711	2005 TA_{127}	—	October 7, 2005	Kitt Peak	Spacewatch	·	1.7 km	MPC · JPL
188712	2005 TR_{131}	—	October 7, 2005	Kitt Peak	Spacewatch	THM	3.5 km	MPC · JPL
188713	2005 TH_{148}	—	October 8, 2005	Kitt Peak	Spacewatch	·	2.6 km	MPC · JPL
188714	2005 TN_{165}	—	October 9, 2005	Kitt Peak	Spacewatch	·	2.8 km	MPC · JPL
188715	2005 TF_{166}	—	October 9, 2005	Kitt Peak	Spacewatch	·	3.1 km	MPC · JPL
188716	2005 TD_{167}	—	October 9, 2005	Kitt Peak	Spacewatch	·	2.3 km	MPC · JPL
188717	2005 TU_{171}	—	October 10, 2005	Catalina	CSS	·	1.1 km	MPC · JPL
188718	2005 TV_{180}	—	October 1, 2005	Mount Lemmon	Mount Lemmon Survey	·	6.6 km	MPC · JPL
188719	2005 TP_{183}	—	October 7, 2005	Anderson Mesa	LONEOS	MAR	1.9 km	MPC · JPL
188720	2005 TB_{185}	—	October 1, 2005	Mount Lemmon	Mount Lemmon Survey	·	4.4 km	MPC · JPL
188721	2005 UU	—	October 23, 2005	Wrightwood	J. W. Young	·	3.9 km	MPC · JPL
188722	2005 UK_{2}	—	October 23, 2005	Goodricke-Pigott	R. A. Tucker	·	2.3 km	MPC · JPL
188723	2005 UX_{14}	—	October 22, 2005	Kitt Peak	Spacewatch	·	2.2 km	MPC · JPL
188724	2005 UC_{17}	—	October 22, 2005	Kitt Peak	Spacewatch	·	3.1 km	MPC · JPL
188725	2005 UG_{35}	—	October 24, 2005	Kitt Peak	Spacewatch	·	3.0 km	MPC · JPL
188726	2005 UX_{41}	—	October 25, 2005	Kitt Peak	Spacewatch	·	2.9 km	MPC · JPL
188727	2005 UP_{42}	—	October 22, 2005	Kitt Peak	Spacewatch	·	3.7 km	MPC · JPL
188728	2005 UT_{47}	—	October 22, 2005	Catalina	CSS	·	1.9 km	MPC · JPL
188729	2005 UR_{51}	—	October 23, 2005	Catalina	CSS	LUT	6.7 km	MPC · JPL
188730	2005 UK_{52}	—	October 23, 2005	Catalina	CSS	·	4.1 km	MPC · JPL
188731	2005 US_{54}	—	October 23, 2005	Catalina	CSS	·	3.6 km	MPC · JPL
188732	2005 UT_{63}	—	October 25, 2005	Mount Lemmon	Mount Lemmon Survey	AST	2.0 km	MPC · JPL
188733	2005 UT_{66}	—	October 22, 2005	Palomar	NEAT	·	2.9 km	MPC · JPL
188734	2005 UB_{74}	—	October 23, 2005	Palomar	NEAT	·	2.4 km	MPC · JPL
188735	2005 UQ_{79}	—	October 25, 2005	Catalina	CSS	·	4.8 km	MPC · JPL
188736	2005 UF_{104}	—	October 22, 2005	Kitt Peak	Spacewatch	KOR	1.7 km	MPC · JPL
188737	2005 UU_{115}	—	October 23, 2005	Palomar	NEAT	·	3.4 km	MPC · JPL
188738	2005 UA_{120}	—	October 24, 2005	Kitt Peak	Spacewatch	·	3.5 km	MPC · JPL
188739	2005 UN_{123}	—	October 24, 2005	Kitt Peak	Spacewatch	·	2.6 km	MPC · JPL
188740	2005 UU_{138}	—	October 25, 2005	Kitt Peak	Spacewatch	KOR	1.9 km	MPC · JPL
188741	2005 UU_{141}	—	October 25, 2005	Catalina	CSS	·	2.3 km	MPC · JPL
188742	2005 UE_{142}	—	October 25, 2005	Catalina	CSS	V	930 m	MPC · JPL
188743	2005 UU_{142}	—	October 25, 2005	Mount Lemmon	Mount Lemmon Survey	·	3.2 km	MPC · JPL
188744	2005 UO_{148}	—	October 26, 2005	Kitt Peak	Spacewatch	BRA	2.0 km	MPC · JPL
188745	2005 UJ_{149}	—	October 26, 2005	Kitt Peak	Spacewatch	(5)	1.9 km	MPC · JPL
188746	2005 UO_{162}	—	October 27, 2005	Anderson Mesa	LONEOS	·	2.7 km	MPC · JPL
188747	2005 UU_{165}	—	October 24, 2005	Kitt Peak	Spacewatch	·	1.9 km	MPC · JPL
188748	2005 UT_{171}	—	October 24, 2005	Kitt Peak	Spacewatch	·	2.6 km	MPC · JPL
188749	2005 UO_{228}	—	October 25, 2005	Kitt Peak	Spacewatch	·	4.0 km	MPC · JPL
188750	2005 UN_{229}	—	October 25, 2005	Kitt Peak	Spacewatch	·	2.2 km	MPC · JPL
188751	2005 UV_{230}	—	October 25, 2005	Mount Lemmon	Mount Lemmon Survey	·	2.0 km	MPC · JPL
188752	2005 UJ_{231}	—	October 25, 2005	Mount Lemmon	Mount Lemmon Survey	EOS	2.2 km	MPC · JPL
188753	2005 UN_{240}	—	October 25, 2005	Kitt Peak	Spacewatch	·	2.6 km	MPC · JPL
188754	2005 UV_{255}	—	October 24, 2005	Kitt Peak	Spacewatch	KOR	1.8 km	MPC · JPL
188755	2005 UN_{257}	—	October 25, 2005	Kitt Peak	Spacewatch	KOR	2.1 km	MPC · JPL
188756	2005 UF_{266}	—	October 27, 2005	Kitt Peak	Spacewatch	·	3.0 km	MPC · JPL
188757	2005 UA_{283}	—	October 26, 2005	Kitt Peak	Spacewatch	·	2.0 km	MPC · JPL
188758	2005 UP_{299}	—	October 26, 2005	Kitt Peak	Spacewatch	THM	2.8 km	MPC · JPL
188759	2005 UZ_{299}	—	October 26, 2005	Kitt Peak	Spacewatch	·	3.0 km	MPC · JPL
188760	2005 UU_{301}	—	October 26, 2005	Kitt Peak	Spacewatch	·	4.8 km	MPC · JPL
188761	2005 UJ_{324}	—	October 29, 2005	Kitt Peak	Spacewatch	·	1.4 km	MPC · JPL
188762	2005 UG_{334}	—	October 29, 2005	Mount Lemmon	Mount Lemmon Survey	·	4.0 km	MPC · JPL
188763	2005 UQ_{364}	—	October 27, 2005	Kitt Peak	Spacewatch	·	2.2 km	MPC · JPL
188764	2005 US_{387}	—	October 30, 2005	Catalina	CSS	·	3.0 km	MPC · JPL
188765	2005 UZ_{391}	—	October 30, 2005	Kitt Peak	Spacewatch	·	1.4 km	MPC · JPL
188766	2005 US_{397}	—	October 28, 2005	Mount Lemmon	Mount Lemmon Survey	·	1.5 km	MPC · JPL
188767	2005 UJ_{398}	—	October 30, 2005	Mount Lemmon	Mount Lemmon Survey	·	2.0 km	MPC · JPL
188768	2005 UE_{402}	—	October 28, 2005	Mount Lemmon	Mount Lemmon Survey	AST	1.9 km	MPC · JPL
188769	2005 UL_{402}	—	October 28, 2005	Catalina	CSS	AGN	1.7 km	MPC · JPL
188770	2005 UL_{406}	—	October 30, 2005	Kitt Peak	Spacewatch	KOR	1.6 km	MPC · JPL
188771	2005 UE_{411}	—	October 31, 2005	Mount Lemmon	Mount Lemmon Survey	ARM	5.4 km	MPC · JPL
188772	2005 UF_{455}	—	October 28, 2005	Kitt Peak	Spacewatch	·	1.3 km	MPC · JPL
188773	2005 UO_{467}	—	October 30, 2005	Kitt Peak	Spacewatch	V	1.0 km	MPC · JPL
188774	2005 UP_{478}	—	October 27, 2005	Mount Lemmon	Mount Lemmon Survey	·	1.5 km	MPC · JPL
188775	2005 UA_{497}	—	October 27, 2005	Palomar	NEAT	·	2.3 km	MPC · JPL
188776	2005 UD_{498}	—	October 27, 2005	Anderson Mesa	LONEOS	NEM	2.9 km	MPC · JPL
188777	2005 UP_{502}	—	October 31, 2005	Anderson Mesa	LONEOS	WIT	1.3 km	MPC · JPL
188778	2005 UE_{509}	—	October 26, 2005	Kitt Peak	Spacewatch	·	2.3 km	MPC · JPL
188779	2005 UV_{513}	—	October 25, 2005	Kitt Peak	Spacewatch	·	2.4 km	MPC · JPL
188780	2005 UH_{516}	—	October 29, 2005	Mount Lemmon	Mount Lemmon Survey	·	2.9 km	MPC · JPL
188781	2005 UA_{517}	—	October 25, 2005	Apache Point	A. C. Becker	·	1 km	MPC · JPL
188782	2005 VD_{9}	—	November 1, 2005	Kitt Peak	Spacewatch	KOR	1.3 km	MPC · JPL
188783	2005 VB_{26}	—	November 3, 2005	Kitt Peak	Spacewatch	·	2.2 km	MPC · JPL
188784	2005 VW_{33}	—	November 2, 2005	Mount Lemmon	Mount Lemmon Survey	·	3.2 km	MPC · JPL
188785	2005 VB_{41}	—	November 4, 2005	Mount Lemmon	Mount Lemmon Survey	(5)	1.5 km	MPC · JPL
188786	2005 VQ_{42}	—	November 3, 2005	Mount Lemmon	Mount Lemmon Survey	EOS	3.6 km	MPC · JPL
188787	2005 VC_{43}	—	November 5, 2005	Mount Lemmon	Mount Lemmon Survey	·	1.8 km	MPC · JPL
188788	2005 VK_{52}	—	November 3, 2005	Socorro	LINEAR	EUN	1.9 km	MPC · JPL
188789	2005 VL_{52}	—	November 3, 2005	Catalina	CSS	·	6.7 km	MPC · JPL
188790	2005 VP_{58}	—	November 5, 2005	Kitt Peak	Spacewatch	·	2.7 km	MPC · JPL
188791	2005 VK_{74}	—	November 1, 2005	Mount Lemmon	Mount Lemmon Survey	EUN	2.0 km	MPC · JPL
188792	2005 VN_{81}	—	November 5, 2005	Kitt Peak	Spacewatch	·	3.3 km	MPC · JPL
188793	2005 VH_{98}	—	November 7, 2005	Socorro	LINEAR	EOS	2.9 km	MPC · JPL
188794	2005 VX_{110}	—	November 6, 2005	Mount Lemmon	Mount Lemmon Survey	NEM	2.8 km	MPC · JPL
188795	2005 VD_{113}	—	November 10, 2005	Mount Lemmon	Mount Lemmon Survey	CYB	4.1 km	MPC · JPL
188796	2005 VS_{117}	—	November 11, 2005	Kitt Peak	Spacewatch	·	2.7 km	MPC · JPL
188797	2005 VY_{119}	—	November 5, 2005	Socorro	LINEAR	·	6.3 km	MPC · JPL
188798	2005 WV_{33}	—	November 21, 2005	Kitt Peak	Spacewatch	VER	4.0 km	MPC · JPL
188799	2005 WN_{34}	—	November 21, 2005	Catalina	CSS	·	2.6 km	MPC · JPL
188800 Emilyfurfaro	2005 WO_{62}	Emilyfurfaro	November 25, 2005	Catalina	CSS	EOS	2.9 km	MPC · JPL

== 188801–188900 ==
back to top

Designation			Discovery			Properties		Ref
Permanent	Provisional	Named after	Date	Site	Discoverer(s)	Category	Diam.	Ref
188801	2005 WZ_{65}	—	November 22, 2005	Kitt Peak	Spacewatch	KOR	1.8 km	MPC · JPL
188802	2005 WX_{67}	—	November 22, 2005	Kitt Peak	Spacewatch	·	4.5 km	MPC · JPL
188803	2005 WZ_{72}	—	November 25, 2005	Kitt Peak	Spacewatch	·	1.8 km	MPC · JPL
188804	2005 WP_{81}	—	November 28, 2005	Socorro	LINEAR	·	5.9 km	MPC · JPL
188805	2005 WT_{88}	—	November 23, 2005	Socorro	LINEAR	·	2.3 km	MPC · JPL
188806 Scottbednar	2005 WF_{103}	Scottbednar	November 26, 2005	Catalina	CSS	(5)	1.7 km	MPC · JPL
188807	2005 WM_{116}	—	November 30, 2005	Socorro	LINEAR	MIS	3.5 km	MPC · JPL
188808 Jessiewilde	2005 WS_{169}	Jessiewilde	November 30, 2005	Mount Lemmon	Mount Lemmon Survey	KOR	1.7 km	MPC · JPL
188809 Philgroves	2005 WX_{181}	Philgroves	November 25, 2005	Catalina	CSS	·	2.1 km	MPC · JPL
188810	2005 WR_{182}	—	November 26, 2005	Socorro	LINEAR	·	2.8 km	MPC · JPL
188811	2005 WJ_{185}	—	November 29, 2005	Palomar	NEAT	·	5.2 km	MPC · JPL
188812	2005 WK_{190}	—	November 20, 2005	Palomar	NEAT	EOS	3.0 km	MPC · JPL
188813	2005 XV_{1}	—	December 1, 2005	Kitt Peak	Spacewatch	·	2.4 km	MPC · JPL
188814	2005 XS_{9}	—	December 1, 2005	Kitt Peak	Spacewatch	GEF	2.0 km	MPC · JPL
188815	2005 XZ_{12}	—	December 1, 2005	Kitt Peak	Spacewatch	(29841)	2.3 km	MPC · JPL
188816 Lajuanmoore	2005 XU_{24}	Lajuanmoore	December 2, 2005	Mount Lemmon	Mount Lemmon Survey	·	3.3 km	MPC · JPL
188817	2005 XX_{32}	—	December 4, 2005	Kitt Peak	Spacewatch	·	4.7 km	MPC · JPL
188818	2005 XY_{68}	—	December 6, 2005	Kitt Peak	Spacewatch	·	4.3 km	MPC · JPL
188819	2005 XN_{87}	—	December 6, 2005	Socorro	LINEAR	·	4.0 km	MPC · JPL
188820	2005 YW_{1}	—	December 22, 2005	RAS	Lowe, A.	·	2.5 km	MPC · JPL
188821	2005 YR_{6}	—	December 21, 2005	Kitt Peak	Spacewatch	·	1.9 km	MPC · JPL
188822 Shoshanazweider	2005 YT_{65}	Shoshanazweider	December 25, 2005	Mount Lemmon	Mount Lemmon Survey	·	3.6 km	MPC · JPL
188823	2005 YY_{89}	—	December 26, 2005	Mount Lemmon	Mount Lemmon Survey	EOS	3.0 km	MPC · JPL
188824	2005 YZ_{94}	—	December 24, 2005	Kitt Peak	Spacewatch	·	4.3 km	MPC · JPL
188825	2005 YA_{178}	—	December 23, 2005	Kitt Peak	Spacewatch	·	2.6 km	MPC · JPL
188826	2005 YZ_{194}	—	December 31, 2005	Kitt Peak	Spacewatch	EOS	3.1 km	MPC · JPL
188827	2005 YK_{221}	—	December 23, 2005	Kitt Peak	Spacewatch	·	3.3 km	MPC · JPL
188828	2005 YH_{277}	—	December 25, 2005	Kitt Peak	Spacewatch	·	2.0 km	MPC · JPL
188829	2006 AV_{19}	—	January 5, 2006	Catalina	CSS	·	3.1 km	MPC · JPL
188830	2006 AX_{21}	—	January 5, 2006	Catalina	CSS	T_{j} (2.97) · HIL · 3:2	8.5 km	MPC · JPL
188831	2006 AY_{75}	—	January 5, 2006	Socorro	LINEAR	3:2	6.5 km	MPC · JPL
188832	2006 AZ_{77}	—	January 8, 2006	Kitt Peak	Spacewatch	THM	3.4 km	MPC · JPL
188833	2006 BS_{24}	—	January 23, 2006	Mount Lemmon	Mount Lemmon Survey	KOR	2.3 km	MPC · JPL
188834	2006 BW_{36}	—	January 23, 2006	Socorro	LINEAR	·	5.2 km	MPC · JPL
188835	2006 BP_{90}	—	January 25, 2006	Kitt Peak	Spacewatch	L5	8.2 km	MPC · JPL
188836	2006 BK_{159}	—	January 26, 2006	Kitt Peak	Spacewatch	L5	9.9 km	MPC · JPL
188837	2006 BN_{194}	—	January 30, 2006	Kitt Peak	Spacewatch	L5	13 km	MPC · JPL
188838	2006 BG_{201}	—	January 31, 2006	Mount Lemmon	Mount Lemmon Survey	·	5.5 km	MPC · JPL
188839	2006 CA_{6}	—	February 1, 2006	Mount Lemmon	Mount Lemmon Survey	EOS	2.5 km	MPC · JPL
188840	2006 CU_{16}	—	February 1, 2006	Mount Lemmon	Mount Lemmon Survey	·	2.7 km	MPC · JPL
188841	2006 DZ_{39}	—	February 22, 2006	Kitt Peak	Spacewatch	L5	10 km	MPC · JPL
188842	2006 DP_{129}	—	February 25, 2006	Kitt Peak	Spacewatch	L5	9.4 km	MPC · JPL
188843	2006 DX_{131}	—	February 25, 2006	Kitt Peak	Spacewatch	L5	9.7 km	MPC · JPL
188844	2006 DH_{157}	—	February 27, 2006	Kitt Peak	Spacewatch	L5	9.0 km	MPC · JPL
188845	2006 DK_{189}	—	February 27, 2006	Kitt Peak	Spacewatch	L5	11 km	MPC · JPL
188846	2006 EV_{25}	—	March 3, 2006	Kitt Peak	Spacewatch	L5	10 km	MPC · JPL
188847 Rhipeus	2006 FT_{9}	Rhipeus	March 23, 2006	Calvin-Rehoboth	Calvin College	L5	9.4 km	MPC · JPL
188848	2006 RM_{92}	—	September 15, 2006	Kitt Peak	Spacewatch	·	920 m	MPC · JPL
188849	2006 SL_{19}	—	September 18, 2006	Socorro	LINEAR	H	1.0 km	MPC · JPL
188850	2006 SS_{93}	—	September 18, 2006	Kitt Peak	Spacewatch	·	1.2 km	MPC · JPL
188851	2006 SJ_{97}	—	September 18, 2006	Kitt Peak	Spacewatch	MAS	710 m	MPC · JPL
188852	2006 SE_{117}	—	September 24, 2006	Kitt Peak	Spacewatch	·	770 m	MPC · JPL
188853	2006 SE_{150}	—	September 19, 2006	Kitt Peak	Spacewatch	·	1.3 km	MPC · JPL
188854	2006 SF_{151}	—	September 19, 2006	Kitt Peak	Spacewatch	NYS	1.4 km	MPC · JPL
188855	2006 SC_{198}	—	September 28, 2006	RAS	Lowe, A.	·	1.1 km	MPC · JPL
188856	2006 SN_{261}	—	September 26, 2006	Catalina	CSS	·	1.0 km	MPC · JPL
188857	2006 ST_{345}	—	September 28, 2006	Kitt Peak	Spacewatch	·	1.0 km	MPC · JPL
188858	2006 TL_{16}	—	October 11, 2006	Kitt Peak	Spacewatch	·	1.1 km	MPC · JPL
188859	2006 TC_{22}	—	October 11, 2006	Kitt Peak	Spacewatch	·	950 m	MPC · JPL
188860	2006 TX_{28}	—	October 12, 2006	Kitt Peak	Spacewatch	·	880 m	MPC · JPL
188861	2006 TM_{31}	—	October 12, 2006	Kitt Peak	Spacewatch	·	3.2 km	MPC · JPL
188862	2006 TL_{42}	—	October 12, 2006	Kitt Peak	Spacewatch	·	1.1 km	MPC · JPL
188863	2006 TG_{99}	—	October 15, 2006	Kitt Peak	Spacewatch	·	950 m	MPC · JPL
188864	2006 UW_{116}	—	October 19, 2006	Kitt Peak	Spacewatch	NYS	1.2 km	MPC · JPL
188865	2006 UW_{133}	—	October 19, 2006	Kitt Peak	Spacewatch	·	810 m	MPC · JPL
188866	2006 UC_{150}	—	October 20, 2006	Catalina	CSS	·	2.3 km	MPC · JPL
188867 Tin Ho	2006 US_{174}	Tin Ho	October 21, 2006	Lulin Observatory	Q. Ye, Lin, H.-C.	ERI	1.5 km	MPC · JPL
188868	2006 UQ_{180}	—	October 16, 2006	Catalina	CSS	·	1.8 km	MPC · JPL
188869	2006 UE_{197}	—	October 20, 2006	Kitt Peak	Spacewatch	MIS	4.0 km	MPC · JPL
188870	2006 UD_{233}	—	October 21, 2006	Mount Lemmon	Mount Lemmon Survey	·	2.7 km	MPC · JPL
188871	2006 UB_{243}	—	October 27, 2006	Mount Lemmon	Mount Lemmon Survey	·	1.9 km	MPC · JPL
188872	2006 US_{271}	—	October 27, 2006	Mount Lemmon	Mount Lemmon Survey	H	710 m	MPC · JPL
188873	2006 UZ_{271}	—	October 27, 2006	Mount Lemmon	Mount Lemmon Survey	·	1.7 km	MPC · JPL
188874	2006 UA_{287}	—	October 28, 2006	Kitt Peak	Spacewatch	·	1.4 km	MPC · JPL
188875	2006 VV_{6}	—	November 10, 2006	Kitt Peak	Spacewatch	·	1.7 km	MPC · JPL
188876	2006 VL_{20}	—	November 9, 2006	Kitt Peak	Spacewatch	·	1.0 km	MPC · JPL
188877	2006 VM_{44}	—	November 13, 2006	Mount Lemmon	Mount Lemmon Survey	TIR	4.6 km	MPC · JPL
188878	2006 VA_{71}	—	November 11, 2006	Kitt Peak	Spacewatch	·	890 m	MPC · JPL
188879	2006 VG_{101}	—	November 11, 2006	Kitt Peak	Spacewatch	NYS	1.4 km	MPC · JPL
188880	2006 VE_{108}	—	November 13, 2006	Kitt Peak	Spacewatch	·	1.7 km	MPC · JPL
188881	2006 WT_{12}	—	November 16, 2006	Mount Lemmon	Mount Lemmon Survey	·	2.0 km	MPC · JPL
188882	2006 WH_{13}	—	November 16, 2006	Mount Lemmon	Mount Lemmon Survey	·	1.2 km	MPC · JPL
188883	2006 WJ_{44}	—	November 16, 2006	Kitt Peak	Spacewatch	·	1.6 km	MPC · JPL
188884	2006 WM_{44}	—	November 16, 2006	Kitt Peak	Spacewatch	(5)	2.0 km	MPC · JPL
188885	2006 WQ_{69}	—	November 17, 2006	Mount Lemmon	Mount Lemmon Survey	·	1.8 km	MPC · JPL
188886	2006 WL_{81}	—	November 18, 2006	Kitt Peak	Spacewatch	(5)	2.3 km	MPC · JPL
188887	2006 WD_{152}	—	November 21, 2006	Socorro	LINEAR	·	1.4 km	MPC · JPL
188888	2006 WT_{169}	—	November 23, 2006	Kitt Peak	Spacewatch	·	2.2 km	MPC · JPL
188889	2006 WQ_{196}	—	November 20, 2006	Catalina	CSS	·	3.4 km	MPC · JPL
188890	2006 XQ	—	December 9, 2006	Pla D'Arguines	R. Ferrando	·	1.3 km	MPC · JPL
188891	2006 XH_{10}	—	December 9, 2006	Kitt Peak	Spacewatch	·	1.6 km	MPC · JPL
188892	2006 XM_{19}	—	December 11, 2006	Kitt Peak	Spacewatch	·	1.8 km	MPC · JPL
188893	2006 XW_{26}	—	December 12, 2006	Catalina	CSS	·	1.6 km	MPC · JPL
188894 Gerberlouis	2006 XS_{56}	Gerberlouis	December 15, 2006	Marly	P. Kocher	·	1.8 km	MPC · JPL
188895	2006 XW_{62}	—	December 15, 2006	Kitt Peak	Spacewatch	·	1.6 km	MPC · JPL
188896	2006 XX_{68}	—	December 1, 2006	Catalina	CSS	·	2.2 km	MPC · JPL
188897	2006 YD_{8}	—	December 20, 2006	Mount Lemmon	Mount Lemmon Survey	·	1.7 km	MPC · JPL
188898	2006 YQ_{40}	—	December 22, 2006	Kitt Peak	Spacewatch	·	1.3 km	MPC · JPL
188899	2006 YG_{46}	—	December 21, 2006	Palomar	NEAT	(5)	1.8 km	MPC · JPL
188900	2007 AL_{8}	—	January 10, 2007	Nyukasa	Japan Aerospace Exploration Agency	·	2.0 km	MPC · JPL

== 188901–189000 ==
back to top

Designation			Discovery			Properties		Ref
Permanent	Provisional	Named after	Date	Site	Discoverer(s)	Category	Diam.	Ref
188901	2007 AO_{8}	—	January 10, 2007	Nyukasa	Japan Aerospace Exploration Agency	KOR	1.6 km	MPC · JPL
188902	2007 AF_{14}	—	January 9, 2007	Mount Lemmon	Mount Lemmon Survey	·	1.6 km	MPC · JPL
188903	2007 AS_{17}	—	January 15, 2007	Anderson Mesa	LONEOS	·	2.9 km	MPC · JPL
188904	2007 AL_{23}	—	January 10, 2007	Mount Lemmon	Mount Lemmon Survey	·	2.6 km	MPC · JPL
188905	2007 AV_{25}	—	January 15, 2007	Anderson Mesa	LONEOS	PHO	1.3 km	MPC · JPL
188906	2007 AX_{26}	—	January 9, 2007	Mount Lemmon	Mount Lemmon Survey	HOF	3.5 km	MPC · JPL
188907	2007 BL_{5}	—	January 17, 2007	Kitt Peak	Spacewatch	·	3.0 km	MPC · JPL
188908	2007 BS_{8}	—	January 16, 2007	Anderson Mesa	LONEOS	·	1.9 km	MPC · JPL
188909	2007 BC_{9}	—	January 17, 2007	Catalina	CSS	·	2.5 km	MPC · JPL
188910	2007 BG_{10}	—	January 17, 2007	Kitt Peak	Spacewatch	·	1.6 km	MPC · JPL
188911	2007 BN_{10}	—	January 17, 2007	Palomar	NEAT	WIT	1.4 km	MPC · JPL
188912	2007 BV_{14}	—	January 17, 2007	Kitt Peak	Spacewatch	NEM	3.0 km	MPC · JPL
188913	2007 BV_{15}	—	January 17, 2007	Kitt Peak	Spacewatch	KOR	1.4 km	MPC · JPL
188914	2007 BT_{18}	—	January 17, 2007	Palomar	NEAT	EOS	6.2 km	MPC · JPL
188915	2007 BJ_{19}	—	January 21, 2007	Socorro	LINEAR	·	2.0 km	MPC · JPL
188916	2007 BK_{44}	—	January 24, 2007	Catalina	CSS	·	3.1 km	MPC · JPL
188917	2007 BE_{47}	—	January 26, 2007	Kitt Peak	Spacewatch	·	4.4 km	MPC · JPL
188918	2007 BH_{50}	—	January 21, 2007	Socorro	LINEAR	·	2.7 km	MPC · JPL
188919	2007 BF_{53}	—	January 24, 2007	Kitt Peak	Spacewatch	·	2.3 km	MPC · JPL
188920	2007 BP_{64}	—	January 27, 2007	Kitt Peak	Spacewatch	·	2.6 km	MPC · JPL
188921	2007 BV_{66}	—	January 27, 2007	Mount Lemmon	Mount Lemmon Survey	KOR	2.1 km	MPC · JPL
188922	2007 BZ_{66}	—	January 27, 2007	Mount Lemmon	Mount Lemmon Survey	·	3.5 km	MPC · JPL
188923	2007 BC_{74}	—	January 16, 2007	Anderson Mesa	LONEOS	·	5.7 km	MPC · JPL
188924	2007 BL_{75}	—	January 29, 2007	Kitt Peak	Spacewatch	·	2.4 km	MPC · JPL
188925	2007 BM_{76}	—	January 16, 2007	Catalina	CSS	EOS	3.2 km	MPC · JPL
188926	2007 CF_{1}	—	February 6, 2007	Kitt Peak	Spacewatch	·	1.7 km	MPC · JPL
188927	2007 CM_{2}	—	February 6, 2007	Kitt Peak	Spacewatch	CYB	5.1 km	MPC · JPL
188928	2007 CV_{2}	—	February 6, 2007	Kitt Peak	Spacewatch	·	2.4 km	MPC · JPL
188929	2007 CA_{9}	—	February 6, 2007	Kitt Peak	Spacewatch	·	2.0 km	MPC · JPL
188930	2007 CJ_{20}	—	February 6, 2007	Palomar	NEAT	·	2.4 km	MPC · JPL
188931	2007 CB_{25}	—	February 8, 2007	Catalina	CSS	·	2.2 km	MPC · JPL
188932	2007 CU_{28}	—	February 6, 2007	Mount Lemmon	Mount Lemmon Survey	·	2.0 km	MPC · JPL
188933	2007 CC_{31}	—	February 6, 2007	Mount Lemmon	Mount Lemmon Survey	·	2.5 km	MPC · JPL
188934	2007 CC_{42}	—	February 7, 2007	Palomar	NEAT	·	1.8 km	MPC · JPL
188935	2007 CX_{42}	—	February 7, 2007	Mount Lemmon	Mount Lemmon Survey	AGN	1.6 km	MPC · JPL
188936	2007 CD_{58}	—	February 9, 2007	Catalina	CSS	·	3.3 km	MPC · JPL
188937	2007 CW_{61}	—	February 9, 2007	Catalina	CSS	·	4.3 km	MPC · JPL
188938	2007 DO_{1}	—	February 18, 2007	Eskridge	Farpoint	EOS	2.7 km	MPC · JPL
188939	2007 DN_{2}	—	February 16, 2007	Catalina	CSS	·	4.1 km	MPC · JPL
188940	2007 DJ_{3}	—	February 16, 2007	Catalina	CSS	·	3.1 km	MPC · JPL
188941	2007 DT_{7}	—	February 17, 2007	Calvin-Rehoboth	Calvin College	HOF	3.3 km	MPC · JPL
188942	2007 DD_{8}	—	February 21, 2007	Eskridge	Farpoint	L5	14 km	MPC · JPL
188943	2007 DN_{43}	—	February 17, 2007	Catalina	CSS	URS	5.6 km	MPC · JPL
188944	2007 DW_{46}	—	February 21, 2007	Socorro	LINEAR	VER	5.3 km	MPC · JPL
188945	2007 DT_{60}	—	February 17, 2007	Catalina	CSS	·	4.9 km	MPC · JPL
188946	2007 DX_{85}	—	February 21, 2007	Mount Lemmon	Mount Lemmon Survey	·	5.0 km	MPC · JPL
188947	2007 DR_{86}	—	February 23, 2007	Mount Lemmon	Mount Lemmon Survey	EOS	2.2 km	MPC · JPL
188948	2007 EW_{5}	—	March 9, 2007	Mount Lemmon	Mount Lemmon Survey	·	1.4 km	MPC · JPL
188949	2007 EZ_{6}	—	March 9, 2007	Mount Lemmon	Mount Lemmon Survey	·	4.4 km	MPC · JPL
188950	2007 EC_{31}	—	March 10, 2007	Kitt Peak	Spacewatch	·	4.4 km	MPC · JPL
188951	2007 EW_{57}	—	March 9, 2007	Palomar	NEAT	·	4.0 km	MPC · JPL
188952	2007 EA_{73}	—	March 10, 2007	Kitt Peak	Spacewatch	L5	10 km	MPC · JPL
188953	2007 EQ_{80}	—	March 11, 2007	Kitt Peak	Spacewatch	·	1.8 km	MPC · JPL
188954	2007 EK_{114}	—	March 13, 2007	Mount Lemmon	Mount Lemmon Survey	·	1.4 km	MPC · JPL
188955	2007 EE_{127}	—	March 9, 2007	Catalina	CSS	EOS	3.4 km	MPC · JPL
188956	2007 EO_{127}	—	March 9, 2007	Mount Lemmon	Mount Lemmon Survey	·	3.0 km	MPC · JPL
188957	2007 ES_{158}	—	March 14, 2007	Mount Lemmon	Mount Lemmon Survey	·	1.5 km	MPC · JPL
188958	2007 EX_{161}	—	March 15, 2007	Mount Lemmon	Mount Lemmon Survey	·	2.1 km	MPC · JPL
188959	2007 ED_{210}	—	March 8, 2007	Palomar	NEAT	CYB	6.1 km	MPC · JPL
188960	2007 EO_{211}	—	March 8, 2007	Palomar	NEAT	EOS	3.4 km	MPC · JPL
188961	2007 ES_{211}	—	March 8, 2007	Palomar	NEAT	·	4.2 km	MPC · JPL
188962	2007 FP_{8}	—	March 16, 2007	Kitt Peak	Spacewatch	·	3.1 km	MPC · JPL
188963	2007 GQ_{13}	—	April 11, 2007	Kitt Peak	Spacewatch	·	2.0 km	MPC · JPL
188964	2007 HV_{19}	—	April 18, 2007	Kitt Peak	Spacewatch	·	3.9 km	MPC · JPL
188965	2007 YY_{56}	—	December 31, 2007	Kitt Peak	Spacewatch	L5	20 km	MPC · JPL
188966	2008 AQ_{101}	—	January 13, 2008	Kitt Peak	Spacewatch	L5	17 km	MPC · JPL
188967	2008 CW_{153}	—	February 9, 2008	Kitt Peak	Spacewatch	·	1.8 km	MPC · JPL
188968	2008 CN_{183}	—	February 12, 2008	Mount Lemmon	Mount Lemmon Survey	·	4.3 km	MPC · JPL
188969	2008 DH_{38}	—	February 27, 2008	Kitt Peak	Spacewatch	KOR	2.0 km	MPC · JPL
188970	2008 DD_{56}	—	February 28, 2008	Kitt Peak	Spacewatch	·	1.6 km	MPC · JPL
188971	2008 DH_{58}	—	February 27, 2008	Socorro	LINEAR	AGN	1.8 km	MPC · JPL
188972	2008 EW_{11}	—	March 1, 2008	Kitt Peak	Spacewatch	·	3.7 km	MPC · JPL
188973 Siufaiwing	2008 EX_{36}	Siufaiwing	March 3, 2008	XuYi	PMO NEO Survey Program	·	760 m	MPC · JPL
188974	2008 EB_{55}	—	March 6, 2008	Kitt Peak	Spacewatch	EOS	2.1 km	MPC · JPL
188975	2008 ET_{56}	—	March 7, 2008	Catalina	CSS	·	5.1 km	MPC · JPL
188976	2008 EP_{68}	—	March 7, 2008	Mount Lemmon	Mount Lemmon Survey	L5	18 km	MPC · JPL
188977	2008 EY_{89}	—	March 11, 2008	Socorro	LINEAR	V	990 m	MPC · JPL
188978	2008 ER_{119}	—	March 9, 2008	Kitt Peak	Spacewatch	KOR	1.8 km	MPC · JPL
188979	2008 EK_{126}	—	March 10, 2008	Kitt Peak	Spacewatch	·	720 m	MPC · JPL
188980	2008 FR_{15}	—	March 26, 2008	Kitt Peak	Spacewatch	fast	4.2 km	MPC · JPL
188981	2008 FC_{61}	—	March 29, 2008	Mount Lemmon	Mount Lemmon Survey	·	3.2 km	MPC · JPL
188982	2008 FK_{63}	—	March 27, 2008	Kitt Peak	Spacewatch	·	1.5 km	MPC · JPL
188983	2008 FY_{65}	—	March 28, 2008	Mount Lemmon	Mount Lemmon Survey	·	2.7 km	MPC · JPL
188984	2008 FV_{66}	—	March 28, 2008	Kitt Peak	Spacewatch	THM	3.1 km	MPC · JPL
188985	2008 FD_{78}	—	March 27, 2008	Mount Lemmon	Mount Lemmon Survey	·	1.3 km	MPC · JPL
188986	2008 FY_{88}	—	March 28, 2008	Kitt Peak	Spacewatch	L5	9.9 km	MPC · JPL
188987	2008 FY_{96}	—	March 29, 2008	Kitt Peak	Spacewatch	·	2.9 km	MPC · JPL
188988	2008 GQ_{36}	—	April 3, 2008	Kitt Peak	Spacewatch	·	840 m	MPC · JPL
188989	2008 GT_{56}	—	April 5, 2008	Mount Lemmon	Mount Lemmon Survey	·	1.4 km	MPC · JPL
188990	2008 GF_{65}	—	April 6, 2008	Kitt Peak	Spacewatch	·	2.6 km	MPC · JPL
188991	2008 GP_{72}	—	April 7, 2008	Mount Lemmon	Mount Lemmon Survey	MAS	800 m	MPC · JPL
188992	2008 GM_{111}	—	April 7, 2008	Socorro	LINEAR	·	2.7 km	MPC · JPL
188993	2008 GS_{118}	—	April 11, 2008	Catalina	CSS	·	2.5 km	MPC · JPL
188994	2008 HH_{3}	—	April 27, 2008	OAM	OAM	·	2.8 km	MPC · JPL
188995	2008 HB_{20}	—	April 26, 2008	Kitt Peak	Spacewatch	·	4.9 km	MPC · JPL
188996	2008 HE_{33}	—	April 29, 2008	Kitt Peak	Spacewatch	·	790 m	MPC · JPL
188997	2008 HE_{37}	—	April 30, 2008	Mount Lemmon	Mount Lemmon Survey	·	1.0 km	MPC · JPL
188998	2008 HK_{44}	—	April 27, 2008	Mount Lemmon	Mount Lemmon Survey	·	1.0 km	MPC · JPL
188999	2008 HG_{45}	—	April 28, 2008	Kitt Peak	Spacewatch	·	2.4 km	MPC · JPL
189000 Alfredkubin	2008 JZ_{20}	Alfredkubin	May 9, 2008	Gaisberg	Gierlinger, R.	·	1.3 km	MPC · JPL

back to top

== See also ==
- Meanings of minor-planet names: 188001–189000
