= List of minor planets: 488001–489000 =

The following is a partial list of minor planets, running from minor-planet number 488001 through 489000, inclusive. The primary data for this and other partial lists is based on JPL's "Small-Body Orbital Elements" and data available from the Minor Planet Center. Critical list information is also provided by the MPC, unless otherwise specified from Lowell Observatory. A detailed description of the table's columns and additional sources are given on the main page including a complete list of every page in this series, and a statistical break-up on the dynamical classification of minor planets.

Also see the summary list of all named bodies in numerical and alphabetical order, and the corresponding naming citations for the number range of this particular list. New namings may only be added to this list after official publication, as the preannouncement of names is condemned by the Working Group for Small Bodies Nomenclature of the International Astronomical Union.

Near-Earth obj.	MBA (inner)	MBA (outer)	Centaur
Mars-crosser	MBA (middle)	Jupiter trojan	Trans-Neptunian obj.
Unclassified

== 488001–488100 ==
Designation			Discovery			Properties		Ref
Permanent	Provisional	Named after	Date	Site	Discoverer(s)	Category	Diam.	Ref
488001	2015 TD_{346}	—	April 22, 2009	Mount Lemmon	Mount Lemmon Survey	WIT	900 m	MPC · JPL
488002	2015 TK_{346}	—	July 26, 2011	Haleakala	Pan-STARRS 1	·	760 m	MPC · JPL
488003	2015 TM_{346}	—	November 16, 2006	Mount Lemmon	Mount Lemmon Survey	AGN	980 m	MPC · JPL
488004	2015 TO_{346}	—	March 15, 2004	Kitt Peak	Spacewatch	·	2.1 km	MPC · JPL
488005	2015 TZ_{347}	—	September 28, 2006	Kitt Peak	Spacewatch	·	1.9 km	MPC · JPL
488006	2015 TT_{348}	—	November 3, 2011	Kitt Peak	Spacewatch	(5)	1.1 km	MPC · JPL
488007	2015 TA_{349}	—	October 23, 2006	Mount Lemmon	Mount Lemmon Survey	AGN	1.2 km	MPC · JPL
488008	2015 TH_{349}	—	November 12, 2010	Mount Lemmon	Mount Lemmon Survey	·	1.8 km	MPC · JPL
488009	2015 TO_{349}	—	October 8, 2007	Mount Lemmon	Mount Lemmon Survey	·	1.1 km	MPC · JPL
488010	2015 TT_{349}	—	March 4, 2005	Mount Lemmon	Mount Lemmon Survey	·	1.0 km	MPC · JPL
488011	2015 UF_{1}	—	February 14, 2008	Mount Lemmon	Mount Lemmon Survey	·	1.7 km	MPC · JPL
488012	2015 UQ_{1}	—	December 4, 2007	Kitt Peak	Spacewatch	·	1.8 km	MPC · JPL
488013	2015 UU_{2}	—	September 17, 1996	Kitt Peak	Spacewatch	AGN	940 m	MPC · JPL
488014	2015 UD_{6}	—	October 5, 2004	Palomar	NEAT	·	4.0 km	MPC · JPL
488015	2015 US_{6}	—	January 23, 2006	Kitt Peak	Spacewatch	·	2.4 km	MPC · JPL
488016	2015 UL_{9}	—	August 22, 2004	Kitt Peak	Spacewatch	·	2.3 km	MPC · JPL
488017	2015 UF_{13}	—	October 23, 2001	Kitt Peak	Spacewatch	·	1.8 km	MPC · JPL
488018	2015 UL_{14}	—	February 13, 2004	Kitt Peak	Spacewatch	·	1.4 km	MPC · JPL
488019	2015 UL_{15}	—	November 11, 1999	Kitt Peak	Spacewatch	·	2.1 km	MPC · JPL
488020	2015 UJ_{17}	—	January 12, 2008	Mount Lemmon	Mount Lemmon Survey	·	1.6 km	MPC · JPL
488021	2015 UK_{19}	—	August 31, 2000	Kitt Peak	Spacewatch	KOR	1.1 km	MPC · JPL
488022	2015 UT_{21}	—	May 22, 2003	Kitt Peak	Spacewatch	V	600 m	MPC · JPL
488023	2015 UL_{24}	—	May 11, 2010	Mount Lemmon	Mount Lemmon Survey	·	1.2 km	MPC · JPL
488024	2015 UH_{26}	—	November 12, 2010	Mount Lemmon	Mount Lemmon Survey	·	2.6 km	MPC · JPL
488025	2015 UU_{26}	—	October 9, 1999	Socorro	LINEAR	·	2.3 km	MPC · JPL
488026	2015 UM_{28}	—	October 22, 2006	Kitt Peak	Spacewatch	AGN	1.3 km	MPC · JPL
488027	2015 UP_{28}	—	October 2, 2006	Mount Lemmon	Mount Lemmon Survey	AGN	900 m	MPC · JPL
488028	2015 UY_{28}	—	December 22, 2008	Kitt Peak	Spacewatch	·	1.0 km	MPC · JPL
488029	2015 UD_{30}	—	August 30, 2005	Kitt Peak	Spacewatch	KOR	1.5 km	MPC · JPL
488030	2015 UT_{31}	—	October 3, 2006	Mount Lemmon	Mount Lemmon Survey	·	1.7 km	MPC · JPL
488031	2015 UQ_{34}	—	September 30, 2006	Mount Lemmon	Mount Lemmon Survey	·	1.5 km	MPC · JPL
488032	2015 UV_{35}	—	November 7, 2007	Catalina	CSS	·	1.4 km	MPC · JPL
488033	2015 UL_{36}	—	December 28, 2005	Kitt Peak	Spacewatch	·	950 m	MPC · JPL
488034	2015 UZ_{36}	—	October 25, 2011	Haleakala	Pan-STARRS 1	·	1.2 km	MPC · JPL
488035	2015 UC_{38}	—	March 26, 2006	Mount Lemmon	Mount Lemmon Survey	MAS	660 m	MPC · JPL
488036	2015 UR_{39}	—	August 30, 2005	Kitt Peak	Spacewatch	·	710 m	MPC · JPL
488037	2015 UD_{43}	—	April 19, 2013	Haleakala	Pan-STARRS 1	·	1.6 km	MPC · JPL
488038	2015 UK_{43}	—	January 5, 2006	Kitt Peak	Spacewatch	·	1.9 km	MPC · JPL
488039	2015 UN_{43}	—	December 25, 2005	Kitt Peak	Spacewatch	·	2.3 km	MPC · JPL
488040	2015 UB_{44}	—	March 11, 2007	Kitt Peak	Spacewatch	EOS	1.8 km	MPC · JPL
488041	2015 UL_{45}	—	December 7, 2005	Kitt Peak	Spacewatch	·	2.2 km	MPC · JPL
488042	2015 UN_{45}	—	January 29, 2009	Mount Lemmon	Mount Lemmon Survey	·	1.6 km	MPC · JPL
488043	2015 UR_{46}	—	April 5, 2008	Mount Lemmon	Mount Lemmon Survey	·	1.8 km	MPC · JPL
488044	2015 UT_{46}	—	July 2, 2014	Haleakala	Pan-STARRS 1	EOS	1.4 km	MPC · JPL
488045	2015 UA_{47}	—	May 12, 2013	Haleakala	Pan-STARRS 1	·	2.6 km	MPC · JPL
488046	2015 UU_{48}	—	May 12, 2013	Haleakala	Pan-STARRS 1	·	2.7 km	MPC · JPL
488047	2015 UA_{49}	—	December 1, 2011	Haleakala	Pan-STARRS 1	·	1.3 km	MPC · JPL
488048	2015 US_{49}	—	August 30, 2014	Mount Lemmon	Mount Lemmon Survey	·	2.9 km	MPC · JPL
488049	2015 UF_{50}	—	July 27, 2014	Haleakala	Pan-STARRS 1	·	2.7 km	MPC · JPL
488050	2015 UA_{51}	—	February 16, 2012	Haleakala	Pan-STARRS 1	·	2.6 km	MPC · JPL
488051	2015 UE_{53}	—	January 16, 2004	Kitt Peak	Spacewatch	·	1.5 km	MPC · JPL
488052	2015 UF_{53}	—	February 8, 2008	Kitt Peak	Spacewatch	·	2.0 km	MPC · JPL
488053	2015 UN_{53}	—	January 7, 2000	Kitt Peak	Spacewatch	·	2.5 km	MPC · JPL
488054	2015 UW_{53}	—	September 15, 2009	Kitt Peak	Spacewatch	THM	1.9 km	MPC · JPL
488055	2015 UZ_{54}	—	April 13, 2013	Haleakala	Pan-STARRS 1	·	2.8 km	MPC · JPL
488056	2015 UH_{55}	—	July 25, 2014	Haleakala	Pan-STARRS 1	3:2	3.4 km	MPC · JPL
488057	2015 UL_{55}	—	October 19, 2011	Mount Lemmon	Mount Lemmon Survey	·	1.2 km	MPC · JPL
488058	2015 UQ_{55}	—	August 28, 2006	Kitt Peak	Spacewatch	·	1.4 km	MPC · JPL
488059	2015 UR_{56}	—	October 29, 2010	Kitt Peak	Spacewatch	EOS	1.8 km	MPC · JPL
488060	2015 UF_{58}	—	August 21, 2006	Kitt Peak	Spacewatch	·	1.6 km	MPC · JPL
488061	2015 UR_{59}	—	September 16, 2009	Catalina	CSS	·	2.7 km	MPC · JPL
488062	2015 UP_{60}	—	March 24, 2013	Mount Lemmon	Mount Lemmon Survey	·	1.5 km	MPC · JPL
488063	2015 UX_{60}	—	October 18, 2009	Mount Lemmon	Mount Lemmon Survey	·	3.0 km	MPC · JPL
488064	2015 UV_{65}	—	June 24, 2009	Mount Lemmon	Mount Lemmon Survey	·	2.6 km	MPC · JPL
488065	2015 UH_{71}	—	October 28, 2006	Kitt Peak	Spacewatch	AGN	1.2 km	MPC · JPL
488066	2015 UD_{74}	—	September 9, 2015	Haleakala	Pan-STARRS 1	·	960 m	MPC · JPL
488067	2015 US_{75}	—	July 2, 2014	Mount Lemmon	Mount Lemmon Survey	·	3.2 km	MPC · JPL
488068	2015 UJ_{78}	—	July 27, 2014	Haleakala	Pan-STARRS 1	·	1.8 km	MPC · JPL
488069	2015 UN_{78}	—	March 28, 2009	Kitt Peak	Spacewatch	·	1.6 km	MPC · JPL
488070	2015 UQ_{79}	—	August 22, 2014	Haleakala	Pan-STARRS 1	·	2.5 km	MPC · JPL
488071	2015 UO_{82}	—	April 20, 2009	Mount Lemmon	Mount Lemmon Survey	·	1.4 km	MPC · JPL
488072	2015 UF_{84}	—	October 25, 2011	Haleakala	Pan-STARRS 1	·	1.7 km	MPC · JPL
488073	2015 UH_{84}	—	March 12, 2005	Kitt Peak	Spacewatch	·	1.6 km	MPC · JPL
488074	2015 VC_{3}	—	December 31, 2008	Mount Lemmon	Mount Lemmon Survey	·	1.5 km	MPC · JPL
488075	2015 VQ_{5}	—	September 8, 2011	Haleakala	Pan-STARRS 1	PHO	970 m	MPC · JPL
488076	2015 VL_{6}	—	July 27, 2009	Kitt Peak	Spacewatch	·	2.7 km	MPC · JPL
488077	2015 VZ_{24}	—	August 27, 2009	La Sagra	OAM	·	3.4 km	MPC · JPL
488078	2015 VJ_{25}	—	January 21, 2004	Socorro	LINEAR	·	1.8 km	MPC · JPL
488079	2015 VK_{25}	—	December 22, 2006	Kitt Peak	Spacewatch	·	2.0 km	MPC · JPL
488080	2015 VT_{25}	—	October 18, 2006	Kitt Peak	Spacewatch	·	2.0 km	MPC · JPL
488081	2015 VN_{29}	—	October 10, 2005	Catalina	CSS	·	2.4 km	MPC · JPL
488082	2015 VE_{30}	—	July 4, 2014	Haleakala	Pan-STARRS 1	·	1.9 km	MPC · JPL
488083	2015 VL_{30}	—	September 27, 2009	Mount Lemmon	Mount Lemmon Survey	·	2.9 km	MPC · JPL
488084	2015 VS_{30}	—	September 19, 2006	Anderson Mesa	LONEOS	·	1.8 km	MPC · JPL
488085	2015 VV_{30}	—	July 21, 2006	Mount Lemmon	Mount Lemmon Survey	·	1.8 km	MPC · JPL
488086	2015 VX_{33}	—	November 7, 2005	Mauna Kea	A. Boattini	·	2.7 km	MPC · JPL
488087	2015 VE_{36}	—	November 16, 2006	Catalina	CSS	·	1.5 km	MPC · JPL
488088	2015 VT_{36}	—	October 2, 2006	Mount Lemmon	Mount Lemmon Survey	·	1.7 km	MPC · JPL
488089	2015 VU_{36}	—	February 26, 2012	Haleakala	Pan-STARRS 1	·	2.7 km	MPC · JPL
488090	2015 VV_{40}	—	March 13, 2012	Mount Lemmon	Mount Lemmon Survey	·	3.1 km	MPC · JPL
488091	2015 VG_{41}	—	February 1, 2012	Mount Lemmon	Mount Lemmon Survey	EOS	1.9 km	MPC · JPL
488092	2015 VC_{42}	—	May 30, 2010	WISE	WISE	DOR	3.7 km	MPC · JPL
488093	2015 VC_{52}	—	October 10, 1999	Kitt Peak	Spacewatch	EOS	1.7 km	MPC · JPL
488094	2015 VE_{62}	—	March 12, 2007	Kitt Peak	Spacewatch	·	690 m	MPC · JPL
488095	2015 VS_{62}	—	March 4, 2005	Mount Lemmon	Mount Lemmon Survey	EUN	1.2 km	MPC · JPL
488096	2015 VU_{62}	—	May 15, 2005	Kitt Peak	Spacewatch	EUN	1.1 km	MPC · JPL
488097	2015 VW_{62}	—	December 11, 2010	Kitt Peak	Spacewatch	VER	2.4 km	MPC · JPL
488098	2015 VY_{62}	—	February 26, 2012	Haleakala	Pan-STARRS 1	·	1.9 km	MPC · JPL
488099	2015 VQ_{63}	—	December 28, 2005	Kitt Peak	Spacewatch	·	2.2 km	MPC · JPL
488100	2015 VR_{63}	—	August 4, 2014	Haleakala	Pan-STARRS 1	·	2.0 km	MPC · JPL

== 488101–488200 ==
back to top

Designation			Discovery			Properties		Ref
Permanent	Provisional	Named after	Date	Site	Discoverer(s)	Category	Diam.	Ref
488101	2015 VU_{63}	—	September 24, 2009	La Sagra	OAM	·	4.5 km	MPC · JPL
488102	2015 VQ_{66}	—	November 3, 2010	Kitt Peak	Spacewatch	·	2.6 km	MPC · JPL
488103	2015 VR_{66}	—	July 1, 2014	Haleakala	Pan-STARRS 1	LIX	3.4 km	MPC · JPL
488104	2015 VP_{67}	—	May 9, 2007	Mount Lemmon	Mount Lemmon Survey	·	970 m	MPC · JPL
488105	2015 VW_{71}	—	September 28, 2003	Kitt Peak	Spacewatch	·	2.1 km	MPC · JPL
488106	2015 VU_{76}	—	April 10, 2005	Mount Lemmon	Mount Lemmon Survey	·	1.2 km	MPC · JPL
488107	2015 VZ_{77}	—	June 27, 2014	Haleakala	Pan-STARRS 1	·	2.4 km	MPC · JPL
488108	2015 VH_{78}	—	December 8, 2010	Mount Lemmon	Mount Lemmon Survey	·	2.9 km	MPC · JPL
488109	2015 VQ_{78}	—	October 19, 2001	Palomar	NEAT	DOR	2.5 km	MPC · JPL
488110	2015 VC_{79}	—	December 31, 2007	Mount Lemmon	Mount Lemmon Survey	·	1.4 km	MPC · JPL
488111	2015 VY_{81}	—	October 16, 2006	Catalina	CSS	NEM	2.3 km	MPC · JPL
488112	2015 VU_{82}	—	November 17, 2006	Mount Lemmon	Mount Lemmon Survey	AGN	1.3 km	MPC · JPL
488113	2015 VZ_{83}	—	December 3, 2010	Kitt Peak	Spacewatch	EOS	1.9 km	MPC · JPL
488114	2015 VD_{84}	—	August 17, 2009	La Sagra	OAM	LIX	3.3 km	MPC · JPL
488115	2015 VW_{89}	—	January 23, 2006	Kitt Peak	Spacewatch	·	1.5 km	MPC · JPL
488116	2015 VL_{100}	—	December 7, 2005	Kitt Peak	Spacewatch	·	790 m	MPC · JPL
488117	2015 VP_{101}	—	October 3, 2006	Mount Lemmon	Mount Lemmon Survey	·	1.6 km	MPC · JPL
488118	2015 VE_{102}	—	December 17, 2001	Socorro	LINEAR	·	2.8 km	MPC · JPL
488119	2015 VG_{102}	—	October 9, 2004	Anderson Mesa	LONEOS	EOS	2.3 km	MPC · JPL
488120	2015 VR_{102}	—	February 8, 2008	Mount Lemmon	Mount Lemmon Survey	HOF	2.6 km	MPC · JPL
488121	2015 VX_{103}	—	August 4, 2003	Kitt Peak	Spacewatch	·	3.2 km	MPC · JPL
488122	2015 VZ_{106}	—	October 19, 2007	Mount Lemmon	Mount Lemmon Survey	·	1.8 km	MPC · JPL
488123	2015 VU_{107}	—	October 1, 2010	Catalina	CSS	·	2.2 km	MPC · JPL
488124	2015 VF_{111}	—	October 27, 2006	Catalina	CSS	·	2.4 km	MPC · JPL
488125	2015 VC_{112}	—	January 31, 2006	Kitt Peak	Spacewatch	·	2.8 km	MPC · JPL
488126	2015 VK_{113}	—	April 10, 2013	Haleakala	Pan-STARRS 1	·	2.2 km	MPC · JPL
488127	2015 VP_{116}	—	June 4, 2014	Haleakala	Pan-STARRS 1	·	2.3 km	MPC · JPL
488128	2015 VH_{117}	—	March 9, 2007	Mount Lemmon	Mount Lemmon Survey	·	1.6 km	MPC · JPL
488129	2015 VH_{120}	—	March 16, 2012	Haleakala	Pan-STARRS 1	·	3.0 km	MPC · JPL
488130	2015 VS_{120}	—	May 26, 2014	Haleakala	Pan-STARRS 1	EUN	1.2 km	MPC · JPL
488131	2015 VJ_{121}	—	December 10, 2010	Kitt Peak	Spacewatch	EOS	2.2 km	MPC · JPL
488132	2015 VK_{121}	—	December 10, 2004	Kitt Peak	Spacewatch	T_{j} (2.98)	3.1 km	MPC · JPL
488133	2015 VO_{121}	—	October 31, 2011	Mount Lemmon	Mount Lemmon Survey	·	1.5 km	MPC · JPL
488134	2015 VA_{124}	—	January 9, 2010	WISE	WISE	·	4.4 km	MPC · JPL
488135	2015 VL_{124}	—	December 7, 2004	Socorro	LINEAR	·	3.3 km	MPC · JPL
488136	2015 VR_{124}	—	April 16, 2013	Haleakala	Pan-STARRS 1	·	2.6 km	MPC · JPL
488137	2015 VB_{129}	—	October 12, 1993	Kitt Peak	Spacewatch	·	2.9 km	MPC · JPL
488138	2015 VH_{129}	—	October 29, 2008	Mount Lemmon	Mount Lemmon Survey	·	770 m	MPC · JPL
488139	2015 VB_{130}	—	November 13, 2006	Catalina	CSS	·	1.8 km	MPC · JPL
488140	2015 VK_{131}	—	September 10, 2005	Anderson Mesa	LONEOS	·	2.3 km	MPC · JPL
488141	2015 VD_{133}	—	January 19, 2008	Mount Lemmon	Mount Lemmon Survey	·	2.1 km	MPC · JPL
488142	2015 VG_{134}	—	October 9, 2004	Kitt Peak	Spacewatch	EOS	1.9 km	MPC · JPL
488143	2015 VQ_{135}	—	January 24, 2006	Anderson Mesa	LONEOS	EOS	2.2 km	MPC · JPL
488144	2015 VL_{138}	—	April 18, 2013	Haleakala	Pan-STARRS 1	BRA	1.9 km	MPC · JPL
488145	2015 VZ_{138}	—	October 2, 2006	Mount Lemmon	Mount Lemmon Survey	·	1.3 km	MPC · JPL
488146	2015 VK_{139}	—	September 20, 2009	Kitt Peak	Spacewatch	·	2.7 km	MPC · JPL
488147	2015 VK_{141}	—	January 15, 2010	WISE	WISE	·	5.6 km	MPC · JPL
488148	2015 VE_{143}	—	September 20, 2011	Haleakala	Pan-STARRS 1	·	1.4 km	MPC · JPL
488149	2015 VU_{145}	—	April 14, 2007	Kitt Peak	Spacewatch	·	1.1 km	MPC · JPL
488150	2015 VB_{147}	—	December 14, 2010	Mount Lemmon	Mount Lemmon Survey	·	2.2 km	MPC · JPL
488151	2015 VS_{148}	—	December 28, 2005	Kitt Peak	Spacewatch	EOS	1.7 km	MPC · JPL
488152	2015 WT_{4}	—	November 15, 2010	Mount Lemmon	Mount Lemmon Survey	·	3.0 km	MPC · JPL
488153	2015 WP_{9}	—	November 28, 2010	Mount Lemmon	Mount Lemmon Survey	·	2.3 km	MPC · JPL
488154	2015 WW_{9}	—	September 16, 2009	Catalina	CSS	EOS	2.3 km	MPC · JPL
488155	2015 WQ_{13}	—	January 31, 2006	Mount Lemmon	Mount Lemmon Survey	·	1.8 km	MPC · JPL
488156	2015 WY_{13}	—	December 23, 2011	Haleakala	Pan-STARRS 1	·	2.6 km	MPC · JPL
488157	2015 WS_{14}	—	September 16, 2009	Mount Lemmon	Mount Lemmon Survey	·	2.4 km	MPC · JPL
488158	2015 WL_{15}	—	April 17, 2013	Haleakala	Pan-STARRS 1	·	3.1 km	MPC · JPL
488159	2015 XM_{2}	—	January 31, 2012	Catalina	CSS	·	2.0 km	MPC · JPL
488160	2015 XX_{4}	—	July 25, 2014	Haleakala	Pan-STARRS 1	·	3.1 km	MPC · JPL
488161	2015 XK_{5}	—	March 17, 2012	Mount Lemmon	Mount Lemmon Survey	·	2.5 km	MPC · JPL
488162	2015 XR_{5}	—	June 25, 2014	Mount Lemmon	Mount Lemmon Survey	·	1.8 km	MPC · JPL
488163	2015 XA_{6}	—	May 27, 2008	Kitt Peak	Spacewatch	·	2.6 km	MPC · JPL
488164	2015 XK_{6}	—	January 6, 2006	Mount Lemmon	Mount Lemmon Survey	·	1.8 km	MPC · JPL
488165	2015 XW_{38}	—	October 17, 2006	Mount Lemmon	Mount Lemmon Survey	·	1.3 km	MPC · JPL
488166	2015 XT_{44}	—	December 27, 2006	Mount Lemmon	Mount Lemmon Survey	KOR	1.2 km	MPC · JPL
488167	2015 XV_{44}	—	December 13, 2010	Mount Lemmon	Mount Lemmon Survey	·	2.0 km	MPC · JPL
488168	2015 XA_{54}	—	December 2, 2010	Kitt Peak	Spacewatch	·	2.7 km	MPC · JPL
488169	2015 XU_{55}	—	November 30, 2010	Mount Lemmon	Mount Lemmon Survey	·	2.9 km	MPC · JPL
488170	2015 XC_{56}	—	November 23, 2009	Mount Lemmon	Mount Lemmon Survey	·	2.8 km	MPC · JPL
488171	2015 XO_{57}	—	February 20, 2012	Haleakala	Pan-STARRS 1	EOS	1.7 km	MPC · JPL
488172	2015 XY_{60}	—	October 20, 2003	Kitt Peak	Spacewatch	·	1.7 km	MPC · JPL
488173	2015 XL_{61}	—	May 10, 2013	Kitt Peak	Spacewatch	·	1.2 km	MPC · JPL
488174	2015 XV_{64}	—	January 27, 2012	Mount Lemmon	Mount Lemmon Survey	·	1.6 km	MPC · JPL
488175	2015 XL_{68}	—	December 6, 2010	Mount Lemmon	Mount Lemmon Survey	·	2.4 km	MPC · JPL
488176	2015 XO_{69}	—	April 17, 2013	Haleakala	Pan-STARRS 1	·	3.2 km	MPC · JPL
488177	2015 XZ_{71}	—	May 7, 2008	Mount Lemmon	Mount Lemmon Survey	·	3.3 km	MPC · JPL
488178	2015 XA_{77}	—	December 25, 2005	Kitt Peak	Spacewatch	·	2.1 km	MPC · JPL
488179	2015 XN_{84}	—	December 20, 2004	Mount Lemmon	Mount Lemmon Survey	·	3.0 km	MPC · JPL
488180	2015 XL_{86}	—	December 25, 2005	Kitt Peak	Spacewatch	·	3.5 km	MPC · JPL
488181	2015 XO_{98}	—	April 28, 2009	Kitt Peak	Spacewatch	MAR	770 m	MPC · JPL
488182	2015 XD_{112}	—	January 6, 2006	Kitt Peak	Spacewatch	EOS	1.7 km	MPC · JPL
488183	2015 XM_{114}	—	September 17, 2009	Mount Lemmon	Mount Lemmon Survey	EOS	1.4 km	MPC · JPL
488184	2015 XK_{116}	—	February 13, 2007	Mount Lemmon	Mount Lemmon Survey	·	1.5 km	MPC · JPL
488185	2015 XS_{130}	—	March 24, 2012	Mount Lemmon	Mount Lemmon Survey	·	1.4 km	MPC · JPL
488186	2015 XD_{138}	—	May 16, 2013	Mount Lemmon	Mount Lemmon Survey	EOS	1.9 km	MPC · JPL
488187	2015 XM_{147}	—	June 4, 2014	Haleakala	Pan-STARRS 1	·	1.4 km	MPC · JPL
488188	2015 XG_{161}	—	February 20, 2012	Haleakala	Pan-STARRS 1	·	2.6 km	MPC · JPL
488189	2015 XN_{167}	—	June 21, 2010	Mount Lemmon	Mount Lemmon Survey	L5	9.2 km	MPC · JPL
488190	2015 XX_{177}	—	February 25, 2007	Mount Lemmon	Mount Lemmon Survey	·	1.6 km	MPC · JPL
488191	2015 XD_{184}	—	October 5, 2004	Kitt Peak	Spacewatch	·	1.6 km	MPC · JPL
488192	2015 XT_{184}	—	September 18, 2003	Kitt Peak	Spacewatch	·	2.3 km	MPC · JPL
488193	2015 XY_{187}	—	March 11, 2007	Kitt Peak	Spacewatch	·	2.3 km	MPC · JPL
488194	2015 XT_{198}	—	January 22, 2010	WISE	WISE	·	4.1 km	MPC · JPL
488195	2015 XQ_{199}	—	November 12, 2007	Mount Lemmon	Mount Lemmon Survey	(5)	1.4 km	MPC · JPL
488196	2015 XZ_{199}	—	December 2, 2010	Kitt Peak	Spacewatch	·	2.3 km	MPC · JPL
488197	2015 XT_{208}	—	October 30, 2005	Kitt Peak	Spacewatch	·	1.5 km	MPC · JPL
488198	2015 XR_{210}	—	November 19, 2004	Catalina	CSS	EOS	1.8 km	MPC · JPL
488199	2015 XO_{224}	—	October 14, 2009	Mount Lemmon	Mount Lemmon Survey	·	2.6 km	MPC · JPL
488200	2015 XY_{226}	—	January 17, 2011	Mount Lemmon	Mount Lemmon Survey	·	2.3 km	MPC · JPL

== 488201–488300 ==
back to top

Designation			Discovery			Properties		Ref
Permanent	Provisional	Named after	Date	Site	Discoverer(s)	Category	Diam.	Ref
488201	2015 XJ_{244}	—	August 28, 2014	Haleakala	Pan-STARRS 1	EOS	1.8 km	MPC · JPL
488202	2015 XB_{253}	—	May 31, 2014	Haleakala	Pan-STARRS 1	BRA	1.6 km	MPC · JPL
488203	2015 XG_{255}	—	February 8, 2011	Mount Lemmon	Mount Lemmon Survey	·	3.0 km	MPC · JPL
488204	2015 XE_{257}	—	February 28, 2012	Haleakala	Pan-STARRS 1	·	3.9 km	MPC · JPL
488205	2015 XU_{262}	—	May 18, 2013	Mount Lemmon	Mount Lemmon Survey	·	2.6 km	MPC · JPL
488206	2015 XC_{264}	—	July 29, 2014	Haleakala	Pan-STARRS 1	·	1.5 km	MPC · JPL
488207	2015 XU_{278}	—	August 8, 2004	Anderson Mesa	LONEOS	·	1.8 km	MPC · JPL
488208	2015 XW_{278}	—	September 15, 2009	Kitt Peak	Spacewatch	EOS	1.8 km	MPC · JPL
488209	2015 XA_{279}	—	December 10, 2010	Kitt Peak	Spacewatch	EOS	1.6 km	MPC · JPL
488210	2015 XN_{292}	—	June 3, 2014	Haleakala	Pan-STARRS 1	·	2.2 km	MPC · JPL
488211	2015 XR_{295}	—	September 27, 2009	Mount Lemmon	Mount Lemmon Survey	·	2.5 km	MPC · JPL
488212	2015 XB_{309}	—	September 22, 2009	La Sagra	OAM	·	3.5 km	MPC · JPL
488213	2015 XP_{311}	—	December 5, 2005	Mount Lemmon	Mount Lemmon Survey	·	1.6 km	MPC · JPL
488214	2015 XC_{313}	—	June 28, 2014	Haleakala	Pan-STARRS 1	EOS	1.7 km	MPC · JPL
488215	2015 XA_{315}	—	September 8, 2010	La Sagra	OAM	·	2.6 km	MPC · JPL
488216	2015 XK_{315}	—	November 3, 2005	Mount Lemmon	Mount Lemmon Survey	·	2.7 km	MPC · JPL
488217	2015 XS_{331}	—	October 24, 2011	Haleakala	Pan-STARRS 1	·	1.1 km	MPC · JPL
488218	2015 XU_{364}	—	November 20, 2009	Mount Lemmon	Mount Lemmon Survey	·	3.5 km	MPC · JPL
488219	2015 XN_{367}	—	November 5, 2010	Mount Lemmon	Mount Lemmon Survey	EOS	2.0 km	MPC · JPL
488220	2015 XR_{368}	—	June 3, 2014	Haleakala	Pan-STARRS 1	·	2.3 km	MPC · JPL
488221	2015 YW_{14}	—	July 15, 2004	Siding Spring	SSS	·	2.9 km	MPC · JPL
488222	2015 YS_{18}	—	January 13, 2004	Kitt Peak	Spacewatch	·	1.8 km	MPC · JPL
488223	2016 AT_{5}	—	April 27, 2010	WISE	WISE	L5	10 km	MPC · JPL
488224	2016 AV_{6}	—	September 6, 2008	Catalina	CSS	·	3.6 km	MPC · JPL
488225	2016 AQ_{13}	—	November 9, 2004	Catalina	CSS	·	2.4 km	MPC · JPL
488226	2016 AK_{19}	—	November 19, 2003	Kitt Peak	Spacewatch	·	2.7 km	MPC · JPL
488227	2016 AH_{30}	—	January 18, 2008	Kitt Peak	Spacewatch	·	1.4 km	MPC · JPL
488228	2016 AE_{44}	—	January 30, 2011	Kitt Peak	Spacewatch	·	4.1 km	MPC · JPL
488229	2016 AM_{44}	—	October 7, 2005	Mount Lemmon	Mount Lemmon Survey	·	2.4 km	MPC · JPL
488230	2016 AR_{44}	—	January 4, 2016	Haleakala	Pan-STARRS 1	L5	7.0 km	MPC · JPL
488231	2016 AH_{50}	—	December 13, 2006	Mount Lemmon	Mount Lemmon Survey	·	1.7 km	MPC · JPL
488232	2016 AL_{57}	—	November 26, 2009	Mount Lemmon	Mount Lemmon Survey	·	3.0 km	MPC · JPL
488233	2016 AL_{75}	—	April 25, 2012	Mount Lemmon	Mount Lemmon Survey	·	3.7 km	MPC · JPL
488234	2016 AG_{76}	—	October 1, 2014	Haleakala	Pan-STARRS 1	EOS	2.0 km	MPC · JPL
488235	2016 AH_{77}	—	February 2, 2005	Kitt Peak	Spacewatch	L5	10 km	MPC · JPL
488236	2016 AA_{95}	—	October 5, 1997	Kitt Peak	Spacewatch	·	1.0 km	MPC · JPL
488237	2016 AX_{106}	—	November 1, 2005	Mount Lemmon	Mount Lemmon Survey	·	2.1 km	MPC · JPL
488238	2016 AB_{107}	—	June 21, 2007	Mount Lemmon	Mount Lemmon Survey	·	3.8 km	MPC · JPL
488239	2016 AM_{180}	—	September 7, 2008	Mount Lemmon	Mount Lemmon Survey	·	3.4 km	MPC · JPL
488240	2016 AO_{184}	—	May 11, 2007	Kitt Peak	Spacewatch	·	4.4 km	MPC · JPL
488241	2016 AS_{186}	—	November 26, 2011	Haleakala	Pan-STARRS 1	MAR	1.3 km	MPC · JPL
488242	2016 AX_{186}	—	December 19, 2009	Kitt Peak	Spacewatch	·	4.1 km	MPC · JPL
488243	2016 BZ	—	February 4, 2005	Mount Lemmon	Mount Lemmon Survey	L5	10 km	MPC · JPL
488244	2016 BY_{15}	—	March 5, 2010	WISE	WISE	·	3.4 km	MPC · JPL
488245	2016 BL_{26}	—	May 4, 2000	Kitt Peak	Spacewatch	·	1.7 km	MPC · JPL
488246	2016 BN_{32}	—	March 4, 2005	Kitt Peak	Spacewatch	·	3.2 km	MPC · JPL
488247	2016 BT_{33}	—	March 11, 2008	Mount Lemmon	Mount Lemmon Survey	·	1.8 km	MPC · JPL
488248	2016 BD_{38}	—	January 26, 2011	Mount Lemmon	Mount Lemmon Survey	EOS	2.2 km	MPC · JPL
488249	2016 BG_{62}	—	November 12, 2010	Mount Lemmon	Mount Lemmon Survey	·	1.7 km	MPC · JPL
488250	2016 BB_{81}	—	November 9, 2009	Kitt Peak	Spacewatch	·	3.3 km	MPC · JPL
488251	2016 CR	—	February 28, 2012	Haleakala	Pan-STARRS 1	·	2.0 km	MPC · JPL
488252	2016 CK_{17}	—	September 24, 2008	Mount Lemmon	Mount Lemmon Survey	·	2.5 km	MPC · JPL
488253	2016 CF_{18}	—	December 7, 2005	Kitt Peak	Spacewatch	·	2.1 km	MPC · JPL
488254	2016 CG_{24}	—	April 18, 2012	Kitt Peak	Spacewatch	·	3.8 km	MPC · JPL
488255	2016 CK_{33}	—	February 1, 2006	Kitt Peak	Spacewatch	EOS	1.9 km	MPC · JPL
488256	2016 CR_{48}	—	March 9, 2005	Mount Lemmon	Mount Lemmon Survey	·	3.2 km	MPC · JPL
488257	2016 CV_{208}	—	March 25, 2011	Kitt Peak	Spacewatch	·	2.8 km	MPC · JPL
488258	2016 CA_{258}	—	March 2, 2006	Kitt Peak	Spacewatch	·	2.2 km	MPC · JPL
488259	2016 EN_{119}	—	February 13, 2013	Haleakala	Pan-STARRS 1	·	2.0 km	MPC · JPL
488260	2016 HS_{23}	—	December 31, 2011	Kitt Peak	Spacewatch	·	810 m	MPC · JPL
488261	2016 NO_{54}	—	July 2, 2011	Mount Lemmon	Mount Lemmon Survey	·	2.7 km	MPC · JPL
488262	2016 QG_{1}	—	June 20, 2013	Haleakala	Pan-STARRS 1	H	570 m	MPC · JPL
488263	2016 QX_{26}	—	June 5, 2011	Mount Lemmon	Mount Lemmon Survey	·	1.5 km	MPC · JPL
488264	2016 RD	—	June 13, 2005	Mount Lemmon	Mount Lemmon Survey	NYS	860 m	MPC · JPL
488265	2016 RO_{7}	—	December 7, 2005	Kitt Peak	Spacewatch	·	1.3 km	MPC · JPL
488266	2016 SQ_{5}	—	September 3, 2007	Mount Lemmon	Mount Lemmon Survey	·	2.5 km	MPC · JPL
488267	2016 SM_{6}	—	March 4, 2005	Kitt Peak	Spacewatch	·	1.2 km	MPC · JPL
488268	2016 SO_{6}	—	November 12, 2005	Catalina	CSS	·	3.0 km	MPC · JPL
488269	2016 TF_{3}	—	February 26, 2014	Haleakala	Pan-STARRS 1	EUN	1.2 km	MPC · JPL
488270	2016 TK_{8}	—	October 1, 2005	Anderson Mesa	LONEOS	·	1.4 km	MPC · JPL
488271	2016 TT_{9}	—	November 28, 1999	Kitt Peak	Spacewatch	·	1.4 km	MPC · JPL
488272	2016 TC_{12}	—	July 22, 1995	Kitt Peak	Spacewatch	EUN	1.3 km	MPC · JPL
488273	2016 TW_{12}	—	September 5, 2008	Kitt Peak	Spacewatch	·	1.1 km	MPC · JPL
488274	2016 TD_{13}	—	December 24, 2005	Kitt Peak	Spacewatch	MAS	770 m	MPC · JPL
488275	2016 TH_{20}	—	January 2, 2009	Mount Lemmon	Mount Lemmon Survey	·	1.4 km	MPC · JPL
488276	2016 TB_{25}	—	October 19, 2003	Kitt Peak	Spacewatch	·	2.0 km	MPC · JPL
488277	2016 TX_{46}	—	October 22, 2009	Catalina	CSS	·	840 m	MPC · JPL
488278	2016 TN_{55}	—	October 15, 2012	Siding Spring	SSS	·	1.3 km	MPC · JPL
488279	2016 TB_{82}	—	February 28, 2014	Haleakala	Pan-STARRS 1	·	990 m	MPC · JPL
488280	2016 TD_{87}	—	October 10, 2007	Mount Lemmon	Mount Lemmon Survey	WIT	1.1 km	MPC · JPL
488281	2016 TU_{88}	—	October 25, 2008	Mount Lemmon	Mount Lemmon Survey	·	1.2 km	MPC · JPL
488282	2016 TV_{89}	—	September 4, 2008	Kitt Peak	Spacewatch	·	1.2 km	MPC · JPL
488283	2016 TY_{91}	—	September 24, 2000	Socorro	LINEAR	·	2.1 km	MPC · JPL
488284	2016 UC_{1}	—	September 27, 2003	Kitt Peak	Spacewatch	·	540 m	MPC · JPL
488285	2016 UH_{1}	—	October 20, 2006	Mount Lemmon	Mount Lemmon Survey	·	640 m	MPC · JPL
488286	2016 UN_{9}	—	September 15, 2007	Catalina	CSS	·	2.8 km	MPC · JPL
488287	2016 UJ_{14}	—	September 21, 2011	Haleakala	Pan-STARRS 1	HOF	2.5 km	MPC · JPL
488288	2016 UZ_{14}	—	December 13, 1999	Kitt Peak	Spacewatch	·	1.3 km	MPC · JPL
488289	2016 UA_{15}	—	October 26, 1994	Kitt Peak	Spacewatch	THM	2.0 km	MPC · JPL
488290	2016 UG_{15}	—	November 10, 1999	Kitt Peak	Spacewatch	·	2.4 km	MPC · JPL
488291	2016 UL_{24}	—	September 28, 2008	Mount Lemmon	Mount Lemmon Survey	·	1.3 km	MPC · JPL
488292	2016 UL_{27}	—	November 7, 2008	Mount Lemmon	Mount Lemmon Survey	(5)	1.2 km	MPC · JPL
488293	2016 UY_{27}	—	November 23, 1995	Kitt Peak	Spacewatch	·	2.6 km	MPC · JPL
488294	2016 UB_{28}	—	April 27, 2001	Kitt Peak	Spacewatch	·	1.0 km	MPC · JPL
488295	2016 UV_{33}	—	January 13, 2005	Kitt Peak	Spacewatch	(5)	1.7 km	MPC · JPL
488296	2016 UT_{35}	—	March 26, 2010	Kitt Peak	Spacewatch	MAR	1.3 km	MPC · JPL
488297	2016 UM_{43}	—	September 19, 2001	Socorro	LINEAR	KOR	2.0 km	MPC · JPL
488298	2016 UX_{43}	—	December 31, 2008	Mount Lemmon	Mount Lemmon Survey	MAR	1.3 km	MPC · JPL
488299	2016 UK_{50}	—	September 13, 2007	Mount Lemmon	Mount Lemmon Survey	(12739)	1.4 km	MPC · JPL
488300	2016 UP_{52}	—	September 14, 2005	Kitt Peak	Spacewatch	·	1.1 km	MPC · JPL

== 488301–488400 ==
back to top

Designation			Discovery			Properties		Ref
Permanent	Provisional	Named after	Date	Site	Discoverer(s)	Category	Diam.	Ref
488301	2016 UB_{56}	—	April 24, 2008	Mount Lemmon	Mount Lemmon Survey	·	2.3 km	MPC · JPL
488302	2016 UE_{56}	—	October 21, 2008	Kitt Peak	Spacewatch	H	520 m	MPC · JPL
488303	2016 UN_{56}	—	March 8, 2005	Mount Lemmon	Mount Lemmon Survey	·	1.6 km	MPC · JPL
488304	2016 UL_{67}	—	November 15, 1999	Socorro	LINEAR	·	1.8 km	MPC · JPL
488305	2016 UO_{68}	—	December 1, 2008	Mount Lemmon	Mount Lemmon Survey	·	1.9 km	MPC · JPL
488306	2016 UH_{69}	—	April 25, 2006	Kitt Peak	Spacewatch	fast	1.5 km	MPC · JPL
488307	2016 UM_{70}	—	March 4, 2008	Kitt Peak	Spacewatch	·	2.7 km	MPC · JPL
488308	2016 UF_{71}	—	July 18, 2007	Mount Lemmon	Mount Lemmon Survey	(17392)	1.4 km	MPC · JPL
488309	2016 UL_{71}	—	November 19, 2003	Kitt Peak	Spacewatch	·	1.9 km	MPC · JPL
488310	2016 UY_{72}	—	November 8, 2009	Mount Lemmon	Mount Lemmon Survey	V	600 m	MPC · JPL
488311	2016 UH_{73}	—	September 24, 2011	Mount Lemmon	Mount Lemmon Survey	AST	1.8 km	MPC · JPL
488312	2016 UP_{74}	—	September 13, 2007	Kitt Peak	Spacewatch	·	1.6 km	MPC · JPL
488313	2016 UR_{76}	—	February 2, 2005	Kitt Peak	Spacewatch	·	1.2 km	MPC · JPL
488314	2016 UK_{77}	—	October 22, 2006	Mount Lemmon	Mount Lemmon Survey	·	1.8 km	MPC · JPL
488315	2016 UX_{79}	—	June 25, 2010	WISE	WISE	THB	2.9 km	MPC · JPL
488316	2016 UP_{82}	—	March 29, 2007	Kitt Peak	Spacewatch	·	1.2 km	MPC · JPL
488317	2016 UN_{84}	—	August 8, 2004	Siding Spring	SSS	·	3.3 km	MPC · JPL
488318	2016 UA_{90}	—	October 22, 2005	Kitt Peak	Spacewatch	·	920 m	MPC · JPL
488319	2016 UP_{90}	—	October 20, 2003	Kitt Peak	Spacewatch	·	1.6 km	MPC · JPL
488320	2016 UY_{97}	—	October 16, 2007	Mount Lemmon	Mount Lemmon Survey	·	1.5 km	MPC · JPL
488321	2016 UP_{105}	—	September 28, 2003	Anderson Mesa	LONEOS	(1547)	1.7 km	MPC · JPL
488322	2016 UZ_{106}	—	April 9, 2010	Mount Lemmon	Mount Lemmon Survey	H	620 m	MPC · JPL
488323	2016 UM_{130}	—	October 2, 2003	Kitt Peak	Spacewatch	CYB	3.4 km	MPC · JPL
488324	2016 UH_{135}	—	September 13, 2007	Catalina	CSS	JUN	1.2 km	MPC · JPL
488325	2016 UW_{138}	—	April 30, 2006	Kitt Peak	Spacewatch	·	1.6 km	MPC · JPL
488326	2016 UC_{141}	—	October 19, 2012	Catalina	CSS	·	1.5 km	MPC · JPL
488327	2016 UK_{145}	—	January 9, 2002	Socorro	LINEAR	·	2.3 km	MPC · JPL
488328	2016 UO_{146}	—	September 29, 2005	Catalina	CSS	EOS	2.2 km	MPC · JPL
488329	2016 UX_{146}	—	November 20, 2000	Socorro	LINEAR	·	2.3 km	MPC · JPL
488330	2016 UJ_{147}	—	October 10, 2012	Haleakala	Pan-STARRS 1	·	1.4 km	MPC · JPL
488331	2016 UK_{147}	—	November 21, 2005	Catalina	CSS	·	2.6 km	MPC · JPL
488332	2016 VE	—	December 18, 2004	Socorro	LINEAR	H	470 m	MPC · JPL
488333	2016 VO_{6}	—	October 13, 2012	Haleakala	Pan-STARRS 1	EUN	1.4 km	MPC · JPL
488334	2016 VQ_{6}	—	September 8, 2005	Siding Spring	SSS	·	2.9 km	MPC · JPL
488335	2016 VY_{6}	—	January 28, 2007	Kitt Peak	Spacewatch	·	2.1 km	MPC · JPL
488336	2016 VW_{7}	—	September 21, 2012	Catalina	CSS	·	840 m	MPC · JPL
488337	2016 VZ_{8}	—	October 11, 2007	Catalina	CSS	·	1.7 km	MPC · JPL
488338	2016 VN_{15}	—	May 7, 2014	Haleakala	Pan-STARRS 1	·	1.5 km	MPC · JPL
488339	2016 VF_{16}	—	January 3, 2003	Kitt Peak	Spacewatch	·	1.2 km	MPC · JPL
488340	2016 VH_{16}	—	December 19, 2011	XuYi	PMO NEO Survey Program	·	2.1 km	MPC · JPL
488341	2016 VW_{16}	—	January 1, 2009	Mount Lemmon	Mount Lemmon Survey	·	1.3 km	MPC · JPL
488342	2016 VT_{17}	—	February 28, 2014	Haleakala	Pan-STARRS 1	·	1.9 km	MPC · JPL
488343	2016 VT_{18}	—	February 27, 2006	Kitt Peak	Spacewatch	EUN	1.5 km	MPC · JPL
488344	2016 WE_{2}	—	February 3, 2009	Mount Lemmon	Mount Lemmon Survey	·	2.2 km	MPC · JPL
488345	2016 WH_{2}	—	April 4, 2014	Haleakala	Pan-STARRS 1	EOS	2.3 km	MPC · JPL
488346	2016 WX_{3}	—	November 16, 2011	Kitt Peak	Spacewatch	·	3.3 km	MPC · JPL
488347	2016 WY_{3}	—	October 22, 2009	Mount Lemmon	Mount Lemmon Survey	·	770 m	MPC · JPL
488348	2016 WM_{4}	—	December 2, 2005	Mount Lemmon	Mount Lemmon Survey	·	3.8 km	MPC · JPL
488349	2016 WT_{4}	—	September 14, 2012	Catalina	CSS	·	1.1 km	MPC · JPL
488350	2016 WK_{10}	—	April 12, 2004	Kitt Peak	Spacewatch	·	2.7 km	MPC · JPL
488351	2016 WL_{10}	—	September 29, 2005	Kitt Peak	Spacewatch	EOS	2.1 km	MPC · JPL
488352	2016 WO_{11}	—	September 22, 2009	Catalina	CSS	ULA · CYB	5.3 km	MPC · JPL
488353	2016 WH_{12}	—	September 18, 2003	Kitt Peak	Spacewatch	·	520 m	MPC · JPL
488354	2016 WH_{17}	—	November 7, 2007	Catalina	CSS	·	1.4 km	MPC · JPL
488355	2016 WL_{23}	—	December 9, 2001	Socorro	LINEAR	·	1.5 km	MPC · JPL
488356	2016 WN_{23}	—	December 26, 2006	Kitt Peak	Spacewatch	·	880 m	MPC · JPL
488357	2016 WK_{24}	—	March 4, 2008	Catalina	CSS	·	870 m	MPC · JPL
488358	2016 WT_{24}	—	January 15, 2005	Kitt Peak	Spacewatch	(5)	1.3 km	MPC · JPL
488359	2016 WE_{26}	—	December 11, 2012	Mount Lemmon	Mount Lemmon Survey	·	1.4 km	MPC · JPL
488360	2016 WG_{28}	—	January 19, 2012	Catalina	CSS	·	3.2 km	MPC · JPL
488361	2016 WK_{29}	—	April 14, 2007	Mount Lemmon	Mount Lemmon Survey	·	3.8 km	MPC · JPL
488362	2016 WM_{29}	—	July 29, 2008	Mount Lemmon	Mount Lemmon Survey	·	1.5 km	MPC · JPL
488363	2016 WV_{29}	—	January 15, 2005	Kitt Peak	Spacewatch	·	2.8 km	MPC · JPL
488364	2016 WN_{30}	—	March 10, 2007	Kitt Peak	Spacewatch	·	3.0 km	MPC · JPL
488365	2016 WU_{30}	—	October 23, 2011	Haleakala	Pan-STARRS 1	·	2.7 km	MPC · JPL
488366	2016 WY_{30}	—	October 10, 2007	Kitt Peak	Spacewatch	·	1.6 km	MPC · JPL
488367	2016 WA_{31}	—	February 6, 2013	Catalina	CSS	·	2.0 km	MPC · JPL
488368	2016 WL_{31}	—	December 7, 2005	Kitt Peak	Spacewatch	·	4.5 km	MPC · JPL
488369	2016 WY_{34}	—	October 23, 2004	Kitt Peak	Spacewatch	·	3.1 km	MPC · JPL
488370	2016 WB_{35}	—	November 5, 2012	Kitt Peak	Spacewatch	·	1.3 km	MPC · JPL
488371	2016 WJ_{35}	—	November 11, 2004	Catalina	CSS	·	4.5 km	MPC · JPL
488372	2016 WP_{35}	—	January 16, 2005	Kitt Peak	Spacewatch	·	1.6 km	MPC · JPL
488373	2016 WK_{36}	—	September 30, 2005	Anderson Mesa	LONEOS	EOS	2.6 km	MPC · JPL
488374	2016 WQ_{36}	—	July 12, 2004	Palomar	NEAT	·	4.2 km	MPC · JPL
488375	2016 WH_{37}	—	November 22, 2005	Kitt Peak	Spacewatch	·	3.2 km	MPC · JPL
488376	2016 WT_{39}	—	December 14, 2004	Kitt Peak	Spacewatch	·	1.3 km	MPC · JPL
488377	2016 WT_{41}	—	April 8, 2010	Siding Spring	SSS	PHO	4.0 km	MPC · JPL
488378	2016 WA_{42}	—	October 8, 2005	Kitt Peak	Spacewatch	·	2.7 km	MPC · JPL
488379	2016 WD_{45}	—	April 23, 2007	Mount Lemmon	Mount Lemmon Survey	H	480 m	MPC · JPL
488380	2016 WJ_{45}	—	October 9, 2004	Kitt Peak	Spacewatch	·	3.4 km	MPC · JPL
488381	2016 WR_{46}	—	December 5, 1999	Catalina	CSS	THB	4.1 km	MPC · JPL
488382	2016 WT_{46}	—	May 14, 2004	Kitt Peak	Spacewatch	H	570 m	MPC · JPL
488383	2016 WX_{46}	—	October 18, 2012	Haleakala	Pan-STARRS 1	·	1.2 km	MPC · JPL
488384	2016 WA_{47}	—	November 1, 2010	Mount Lemmon	Mount Lemmon Survey	·	3.1 km	MPC · JPL
488385	2016 WE_{47}	—	October 22, 2005	Kitt Peak	Spacewatch	·	960 m	MPC · JPL
488386	2016 WF_{47}	—	May 8, 2008	Kitt Peak	Spacewatch	·	4.1 km	MPC · JPL
488387	2016 WM_{47}	—	October 12, 1999	Socorro	LINEAR	·	2.8 km	MPC · JPL
488388	2016 WN_{47}	—	November 17, 2006	Kitt Peak	Spacewatch	TEL	2.1 km	MPC · JPL
488389	2016 WT_{47}	—	January 2, 2012	Kitt Peak	Spacewatch	·	1.9 km	MPC · JPL
488390	2016 WH_{48}	—	December 5, 2005	Anderson Mesa	LONEOS	H	550 m	MPC · JPL
488391	2016 WN_{51}	—	December 2, 2004	Catalina	CSS	·	4.4 km	MPC · JPL
488392	2016 WQ_{51}	—	November 3, 2005	Catalina	CSS	·	1.4 km	MPC · JPL
488393	2016 WX_{51}	—	November 6, 2012	Kitt Peak	Spacewatch	MAR	1.1 km	MPC · JPL
488394	2016 WE_{52}	—	October 19, 2011	Haleakala	Pan-STARRS 1	·	1.8 km	MPC · JPL
488395	2016 WQ_{52}	—	March 6, 2008	Mount Lemmon	Mount Lemmon Survey	EOS	2.1 km	MPC · JPL
488396	2016 WU_{52}	—	June 18, 2015	Haleakala	Pan-STARRS 1	·	1.8 km	MPC · JPL
488397	2016 WV_{52}	—	October 2, 2013	Catalina	CSS	·	1.1 km	MPC · JPL
488398	2016 WY_{52}	—	November 22, 2006	Mount Lemmon	Mount Lemmon Survey	·	3.0 km	MPC · JPL
488399	2016 WE_{53}	—	September 12, 2007	Mount Lemmon	Mount Lemmon Survey	MIS	2.2 km	MPC · JPL
488400	2016 WF_{53}	—	September 30, 2005	Mount Lemmon	Mount Lemmon Survey	·	1.2 km	MPC · JPL

== 488401–488500 ==
back to top

Designation			Discovery			Properties		Ref
Permanent	Provisional	Named after	Date	Site	Discoverer(s)	Category	Diam.	Ref
488401	2016 WN_{53}	—	June 17, 2010	WISE	WISE	·	3.2 km	MPC · JPL
488402	2016 WB_{54}	—	September 15, 2004	Kitt Peak	Spacewatch	·	3.2 km	MPC · JPL
488403	2016 WH_{54}	—	December 12, 2004	Campo Imperatore	CINEOS	·	1.2 km	MPC · JPL
488404	2016 WJ_{54}	—	December 3, 2012	Mount Lemmon	Mount Lemmon Survey	(5)	1.2 km	MPC · JPL
488405	2016 WL_{54}	—	January 29, 2007	Kitt Peak	Spacewatch	·	770 m	MPC · JPL
488406	2016 WM_{54}	—	July 4, 2005	Kitt Peak	Spacewatch	·	2.2 km	MPC · JPL
488407	2016 WR_{54}	—	December 1, 2005	Kitt Peak	Spacewatch	NYS	1.1 km	MPC · JPL
488408	2016 WA_{55}	—	January 28, 2006	Kitt Peak	Spacewatch	·	1.1 km	MPC · JPL
488409	2016 WB_{55}	—	November 7, 2007	Catalina	CSS	·	2.0 km	MPC · JPL
488410	2016 WD_{55}	—	January 5, 2006	Catalina	CSS	·	1.3 km	MPC · JPL
488411	2016 WS_{55}	—	December 21, 2006	Kitt Peak	Spacewatch	·	2.8 km	MPC · JPL
488412	2016 XL	—	November 11, 2016	Mount Lemmon	Mount Lemmon Survey	H	410 m	MPC · JPL
488413	2016 XZ_{2}	—	September 18, 2012	Mount Lemmon	Mount Lemmon Survey	V	620 m	MPC · JPL
488414	2016 XA_{3}	—	April 28, 2008	Mount Lemmon	Mount Lemmon Survey	·	2.2 km	MPC · JPL
488415	2016 XF_{3}	—	November 3, 2005	Kitt Peak	Spacewatch	·	2.3 km	MPC · JPL
488416	2016 XR_{3}	—	September 24, 2012	Mount Lemmon	Mount Lemmon Survey	·	1.2 km	MPC · JPL
488417	2016 XF_{4}	—	October 11, 1999	Socorro	LINEAR	·	550 m	MPC · JPL
488418	2016 XJ_{4}	—	May 9, 2010	Siding Spring	SSS	MAR	1.3 km	MPC · JPL
488419	2016 XQ_{5}	—	August 9, 2004	Campo Imperatore	CINEOS	·	4.0 km	MPC · JPL
488420	2016 XP_{6}	—	October 27, 2009	Mount Lemmon	Mount Lemmon Survey	·	680 m	MPC · JPL
488421	2016 XT_{6}	—	January 7, 2005	Campo Imperatore	CINEOS	·	1.2 km	MPC · JPL
488422	2016 XL_{7}	—	February 21, 2007	Mount Lemmon	Mount Lemmon Survey	·	1.2 km	MPC · JPL
488423	2016 XM_{8}	—	September 9, 2007	Kitt Peak	Spacewatch	·	1.5 km	MPC · JPL
488424	2016 XY_{9}	—	March 15, 2007	Mount Lemmon	Mount Lemmon Survey	·	1.5 km	MPC · JPL
488425	2016 XG_{12}	—	January 28, 2000	Kitt Peak	Spacewatch	·	440 m	MPC · JPL
488426	2016 XL_{13}	—	February 1, 2012	Mount Lemmon	Mount Lemmon Survey	VER	2.6 km	MPC · JPL
488427	2016 XW_{14}	—	October 1, 2008	Mount Lemmon	Mount Lemmon Survey	T_{j} (2.95) · 3:2	5.2 km	MPC · JPL
488428	2016 XU_{19}	—	September 13, 2005	Kitt Peak	Spacewatch	·	670 m	MPC · JPL
488429	2016 XJ_{21}	—	June 10, 2010	WISE	WISE	·	3.5 km	MPC · JPL
488430	2016 XT_{21}	—	December 2, 2010	Kitt Peak	Spacewatch	·	2.9 km	MPC · JPL
488431	2016 XW_{21}	—	December 6, 2010	Kitt Peak	Spacewatch	·	4.5 km	MPC · JPL
488432	2016 XB_{22}	—	November 17, 2001	Socorro	LINEAR	·	1.8 km	MPC · JPL
488433	2016 XD_{22}	—	September 5, 2007	Catalina	CSS	·	1.6 km	MPC · JPL
488434	2016 XE_{22}	—	October 16, 2010	Siding Spring	SSS	T_{j} (2.98)	3.3 km	MPC · JPL
488435	2016 XM_{22}	—	December 4, 2012	Catalina	CSS	·	1.3 km	MPC · JPL
488436	2016 XR_{22}	—	September 2, 2007	Mount Lemmon	Mount Lemmon Survey	·	1.6 km	MPC · JPL
488437	2016 XZ_{22}	—	January 10, 2008	Mount Lemmon	Mount Lemmon Survey	·	1.8 km	MPC · JPL
488438	2016 XG_{23}	—	October 1, 2011	Kitt Peak	Spacewatch	·	1.8 km	MPC · JPL
488439	2016 XF_{24}	—	December 7, 2004	Socorro	LINEAR	·	1.7 km	MPC · JPL
488440	2016 XG_{24}	—	April 24, 2014	Kitt Peak	Spacewatch	·	1.4 km	MPC · JPL
488441	2016 XH_{24}	—	December 28, 2007	Socorro	LINEAR	·	2.9 km	MPC · JPL
488442	2016 YH_{2}	—	May 5, 2008	Kitt Peak	Spacewatch	·	3.6 km	MPC · JPL
488443	2016 YT_{2}	—	January 16, 2008	Kitt Peak	Spacewatch	·	2.4 km	MPC · JPL
488444	2016 YK_{5}	—	December 21, 2006	Mount Lemmon	Mount Lemmon Survey	H	400 m	MPC · JPL
488445	2016 YG_{7}	—	February 4, 2005	Catalina	CSS	·	1.4 km	MPC · JPL
488446	2016 YR_{9}	—	June 20, 2010	WISE	WISE	·	3.3 km	MPC · JPL
488447	2016 YU_{9}	—	September 29, 2005	Mount Lemmon	Mount Lemmon Survey	·	1.0 km	MPC · JPL
488448	2016 YC_{10}	—	August 26, 2012	Haleakala	Pan-STARRS 1	·	780 m	MPC · JPL
488449	2016 YL_{10}	—	October 2, 2009	Mount Lemmon	Mount Lemmon Survey	·	4.2 km	MPC · JPL
488450	1994 JX	—	May 14, 1994	Palomar	C. S. Shoemaker	T_{j} (2.9) · AMO +1km	1.4 km	MPC · JPL
488451	1994 ST_{11}	—	September 29, 1994	Kitt Peak	Spacewatch	THM	2.0 km	MPC · JPL
488452	1994 VH_{4}	—	November 5, 1994	Kitt Peak	Spacewatch	(5)	1.2 km	MPC · JPL
488453	1994 XD	—	December 1, 1994	Kitt Peak	Spacewatch	APO · PHA · moon	500 m	MPC · JPL
488454	1995 DC_{9}	—	February 24, 1995	Kitt Peak	Spacewatch	·	2.0 km	MPC · JPL
488455	1995 SA_{10}	—	September 17, 1995	Kitt Peak	Spacewatch	·	1.7 km	MPC · JPL
488456	1995 SM_{62}	—	September 25, 1995	Kitt Peak	Spacewatch	·	720 m	MPC · JPL
488457	1995 TJ_{10}	—	October 1, 1995	Kitt Peak	Spacewatch	·	1.0 km	MPC · JPL
488458	1995 UD_{53}	—	October 23, 1995	Kitt Peak	Spacewatch	EOS	1.5 km	MPC · JPL
488459	1995 UN_{55}	—	October 22, 1995	Kitt Peak	Spacewatch	PHO	690 m	MPC · JPL
488460	1996 BO_{11}	—	January 24, 1996	Kitt Peak	Spacewatch	·	2.6 km	MPC · JPL
488461	1996 FS_{1}	—	March 17, 1996	Kitt Peak	Spacewatch	APO	310 m	MPC · JPL
488462	1996 TD_{1}	—	October 5, 1996	Kitt Peak	Spacewatch	·	1.7 km	MPC · JPL
488463	1996 VE_{35}	—	November 9, 1996	Kitt Peak	Spacewatch	·	2.9 km	MPC · JPL
488464	1997 SD_{7}	—	September 23, 1997	Kitt Peak	Spacewatch	EOS	1.8 km	MPC · JPL
488465	1998 HK_{1}	—	April 18, 1998	Socorro	LINEAR	AMO	380 m	MPC · JPL
488466	1998 QO_{56}	—	August 30, 1998	Kitt Peak	Spacewatch	EOS	1.7 km	MPC · JPL
488467	1998 QE_{58}	—	August 30, 1998	Kitt Peak	Spacewatch	·	1.5 km	MPC · JPL
488468	1998 QG_{59}	—	August 26, 1998	Kitt Peak	Spacewatch	·	1.3 km	MPC · JPL
488469	1998 SQ_{122}	—	September 26, 1998	Socorro	LINEAR	(5)	1.4 km	MPC · JPL
488470	1998 UV_{50}	—	October 27, 1998	Kitt Peak	Spacewatch	EOS	1.7 km	MPC · JPL
488471	1998 WG_{35}	—	November 18, 1998	Kitt Peak	Spacewatch	·	640 m	MPC · JPL
488472	1998 YE_{15}	—	December 22, 1998	Kitt Peak	Spacewatch	·	900 m	MPC · JPL
488473	1999 FW_{80}	—	March 20, 1999	Apache Point	SDSS	·	1.4 km	MPC · JPL
488474	1999 HD_{1}	—	April 16, 1999	Kitt Peak	Spacewatch	APO	310 m	MPC · JPL
488475	1999 RW_{199}	—	September 8, 1999	Socorro	LINEAR	·	2.6 km	MPC · JPL
488476	1999 RN_{239}	—	September 8, 1999	Socorro	LINEAR	·	1.3 km	MPC · JPL
488477	1999 TY_{20}	—	October 7, 1999	Goodricke-Pigott	R. A. Tucker	·	1.8 km	MPC · JPL
488478	1999 TP_{34}	—	September 14, 1999	Socorro	LINEAR	(1547)	1.8 km	MPC · JPL
488479	1999 TB_{45}	—	October 3, 1999	Kitt Peak	Spacewatch	·	2.6 km	MPC · JPL
488480	1999 TC_{46}	—	October 3, 1999	Kitt Peak	Spacewatch	H	540 m	MPC · JPL
488481	1999 TZ_{59}	—	October 7, 1999	Kitt Peak	Spacewatch	·	1.6 km	MPC · JPL
488482	1999 TZ_{188}	—	October 12, 1999	Socorro	LINEAR	·	1.4 km	MPC · JPL
488483	1999 UY_{30}	—	October 31, 1999	Kitt Peak	Spacewatch	·	510 m	MPC · JPL
488484	1999 UP_{31}	—	October 19, 1999	Kitt Peak	Spacewatch	·	1.6 km	MPC · JPL
488485	1999 UU_{55}	—	October 19, 1999	Kitt Peak	Spacewatch	·	1.1 km	MPC · JPL
488486	1999 VQ_{6}	—	November 5, 1999	Catalina	CSS	AMO	650 m	MPC · JPL
488487	1999 VA_{13}	—	October 14, 1999	Socorro	LINEAR	H	650 m	MPC · JPL
488488	1999 VA_{139}	—	November 1, 1999	Kitt Peak	Spacewatch	·	970 m	MPC · JPL
488489	1999 WM_{5}	—	November 15, 1999	Kitt Peak	Spacewatch	H	620 m	MPC · JPL
488490	2000 AF_{205}	—	January 8, 2000	Socorro	LINEAR	APO · PHA	150 m	MPC · JPL
488491	2000 CG_{130}	—	February 3, 2000	Kitt Peak	Spacewatch	THM	1.8 km	MPC · JPL
488492	2000 EX_{202}	—	March 5, 2000	Cerro Tololo	Deep Lens Survey	·	2.3 km	MPC · JPL
488493	2000 FN_{53}	—	March 30, 2000	Kitt Peak	Spacewatch	·	1.8 km	MPC · JPL
488494	2000 JA_{3}	—	May 3, 2000	Socorro	LINEAR	AMO	770 m	MPC · JPL
488495	2000 LO_{31}	—	May 29, 2000	Kitt Peak	Spacewatch	·	3.5 km	MPC · JPL
488496	2000 OM_{1}	—	July 24, 2000	Kitt Peak	Spacewatch	·	1.5 km	MPC · JPL
488497	2000 QM_{20}	—	August 24, 2000	Socorro	LINEAR	·	1.3 km	MPC · JPL
488498	2000 QJ_{117}	—	August 28, 2000	Socorro	LINEAR	·	1.8 km	MPC · JPL
488499	2000 QR_{216}	—	August 31, 2000	Socorro	LINEAR	·	780 m	MPC · JPL
488500	2000 SE_{44}	—	September 24, 2000	Socorro	LINEAR	H	490 m	MPC · JPL

== 488501–488600 ==
back to top

Designation			Discovery			Properties		Ref
Permanent	Provisional	Named after	Date	Site	Discoverer(s)	Category	Diam.	Ref
488501	2000 SH_{84}	—	September 24, 2000	Socorro	LINEAR	·	2.3 km	MPC · JPL
488502	2000 SD_{164}	—	September 24, 2000	Socorro	LINEAR	·	1.9 km	MPC · JPL
488503	2000 SO_{173}	—	September 28, 2000	Socorro	LINEAR	TIR	3.4 km	MPC · JPL
488504	2000 SF_{186}	—	September 21, 2000	Kitt Peak	Spacewatch	·	660 m	MPC · JPL
488505	2000 SA_{241}	—	September 28, 2000	Socorro	LINEAR	PHO	1.1 km	MPC · JPL
488506	2000 SU_{250}	—	September 24, 2000	Socorro	LINEAR	·	1.2 km	MPC · JPL
488507	2000 TF_{50}	—	October 1, 2000	Socorro	LINEAR	·	3.7 km	MPC · JPL
488508	2000 UQ_{3}	—	October 24, 2000	Socorro	LINEAR	·	1.0 km	MPC · JPL
488509	2000 UW_{13}	—	October 27, 2000	Socorro	LINEAR	AMO	270 m	MPC · JPL
488510	2000 UE_{16}	—	October 25, 2000	Socorro	LINEAR	·	1.1 km	MPC · JPL
488511	2000 UF_{76}	—	October 25, 2000	Socorro	LINEAR	PHO	1.2 km	MPC · JPL
488512	2000 US_{95}	—	October 25, 2000	Socorro	LINEAR	·	2.4 km	MPC · JPL
488513	2000 WL_{29}	—	November 21, 2000	Socorro	LINEAR	H	510 m	MPC · JPL
488514	2000 XY_{10}	—	November 1, 2000	Kitt Peak	Spacewatch	(5)	1.2 km	MPC · JPL
488515	2001 FE_{90}	—	March 26, 2001	Anderson Mesa	LONEOS	APO · PHA · fast	260 m	MPC · JPL
488516	2001 FP_{108}	—	March 18, 2001	Socorro	LINEAR	EUN	1.2 km	MPC · JPL
488517	2001 ML_{8}	—	June 24, 2001	Palomar	NEAT	·	2.3 km	MPC · JPL
488518	2001 PL_{30}	—	August 10, 2001	Palomar	NEAT	·	730 m	MPC · JPL
488519	2001 QX_{95}	—	August 23, 2001	Kitt Peak	Spacewatch	·	2.9 km	MPC · JPL
488520	2001 QQ_{146}	—	August 26, 2001	Kitt Peak	Spacewatch	·	960 m	MPC · JPL
488521	2001 QY_{189}	—	August 22, 2001	Socorro	LINEAR	T_{j} (2.96)	3.2 km	MPC · JPL
488522	2001 QV_{211}	—	August 23, 2001	Anderson Mesa	LONEOS	·	940 m	MPC · JPL
488523	2001 QE_{217}	—	August 16, 2001	Socorro	LINEAR	·	620 m	MPC · JPL
488524	2001 QV_{327}	—	August 18, 2001	Palomar	NEAT	·	1.6 km	MPC · JPL
488525	2001 RA_{2}	—	September 7, 2001	Socorro	LINEAR	·	1.5 km	MPC · JPL
488526	2001 RR_{8}	—	September 8, 2001	Socorro	LINEAR	·	900 m	MPC · JPL
488527	2001 RZ_{13}	—	September 10, 2001	Socorro	LINEAR	·	530 m	MPC · JPL
488528	2001 RJ_{16}	—	September 10, 2001	Eskridge	Farpoint	T_{j} (2.97)	4.2 km	MPC · JPL
488529	2001 RV_{85}	—	September 11, 2001	Anderson Mesa	LONEOS	·	630 m	MPC · JPL
488530	2001 RQ_{88}	—	September 11, 2001	Anderson Mesa	LONEOS	·	2.2 km	MPC · JPL
488531	2001 RL_{98}	—	September 12, 2001	Kitt Peak	Spacewatch	·	1.3 km	MPC · JPL
488532	2001 RQ_{108}	—	September 11, 2001	Anderson Mesa	LONEOS	H	490 m	MPC · JPL
488533	2001 RF_{127}	—	September 12, 2001	Socorro	LINEAR	·	4.3 km	MPC · JPL
488534	2001 SZ_{91}	—	August 27, 2001	Kitt Peak	Spacewatch	·	2.3 km	MPC · JPL
488535	2001 SD_{145}	—	September 16, 2001	Socorro	LINEAR	·	1.9 km	MPC · JPL
488536	2001 SY_{150}	—	September 17, 2001	Socorro	LINEAR	·	950 m	MPC · JPL
488537	2001 SC_{189}	—	September 19, 2001	Socorro	LINEAR	MAS	590 m	MPC · JPL
488538	2001 SV_{195}	—	September 19, 2001	Socorro	LINEAR	·	500 m	MPC · JPL
488539	2001 SJ_{198}	—	September 19, 2001	Socorro	LINEAR	·	590 m	MPC · JPL
488540	2001 ST_{219}	—	September 19, 2001	Socorro	LINEAR	·	670 m	MPC · JPL
488541	2001 SD_{242}	—	September 19, 2001	Socorro	LINEAR	·	1.3 km	MPC · JPL
488542	2001 SZ_{293}	—	September 19, 2001	Socorro	LINEAR	·	2.0 km	MPC · JPL
488543	2001 SN_{349}	—	September 18, 2001	Anderson Mesa	LONEOS	·	900 m	MPC · JPL
488544	2001 SV_{355}	—	September 27, 2001	Palomar	NEAT	·	570 m	MPC · JPL
488545	2001 TM_{13}	—	October 14, 2001	Socorro	LINEAR	PHO	960 m	MPC · JPL
488546	2001 TW_{28}	—	October 14, 2001	Socorro	LINEAR	LIX	3.9 km	MPC · JPL
488547	2001 TW_{69}	—	October 13, 2001	Socorro	LINEAR	NYS	960 m	MPC · JPL
488548	2001 TR_{70}	—	October 13, 2001	Socorro	LINEAR	·	1.4 km	MPC · JPL
488549	2001 TH_{91}	—	October 14, 2001	Socorro	LINEAR	·	2.3 km	MPC · JPL
488550	2001 TR_{100}	—	October 14, 2001	Socorro	LINEAR	·	2.7 km	MPC · JPL
488551	2001 TB_{230}	—	October 15, 2001	Kitt Peak	Spacewatch	·	880 m	MPC · JPL
488552	2001 TW_{237}	—	October 10, 2001	Palomar	NEAT	·	880 m	MPC · JPL
488553	2001 TC_{253}	—	October 14, 2001	Apache Point	SDSS	CYB	3.5 km	MPC · JPL
488554	2001 UF_{1}	—	October 18, 2001	Socorro	LINEAR	·	1.4 km	MPC · JPL
488555	2001 UJ_{84}	—	October 21, 2001	Socorro	LINEAR	·	1.8 km	MPC · JPL
488556	2001 UP_{127}	—	October 17, 2001	Socorro	LINEAR	·	2.2 km	MPC · JPL
488557	2001 UB_{191}	—	October 18, 2001	Palomar	NEAT	·	760 m	MPC · JPL
488558	2001 UK_{191}	—	October 18, 2001	Palomar	NEAT	T_{j} (2.99)	3.3 km	MPC · JPL
488559	2001 UO_{195}	—	October 18, 2001	Palomar	NEAT	MAS	570 m	MPC · JPL
488560	2001 UC_{221}	—	October 21, 2001	Socorro	LINEAR	·	1.8 km	MPC · JPL
488561	2001 UR_{231}	—	October 23, 2001	Palomar	NEAT	·	570 m	MPC · JPL
488562	2001 VX_{9}	—	October 17, 2001	Socorro	LINEAR	·	1.6 km	MPC · JPL
488563	2001 VK_{13}	—	October 15, 2001	Socorro	LINEAR	·	1.4 km	MPC · JPL
488564	2001 VN_{111}	—	November 12, 2001	Socorro	LINEAR	·	2.5 km	MPC · JPL
488565	2001 WU_{10}	—	October 23, 2001	Socorro	LINEAR	·	2.8 km	MPC · JPL
488566	2001 WD_{20}	—	September 19, 2001	Socorro	LINEAR	·	1.0 km	MPC · JPL
488567	2001 WK_{63}	—	November 19, 2001	Socorro	LINEAR	·	3.2 km	MPC · JPL
488568	2001 XJ_{13}	—	December 9, 2001	Socorro	LINEAR	·	2.7 km	MPC · JPL
488569	2001 XC_{37}	—	December 9, 2001	Socorro	LINEAR	·	1.3 km	MPC · JPL
488570	2001 XH_{138}	—	November 17, 2001	Socorro	LINEAR	·	1.3 km	MPC · JPL
488571	2001 XS_{219}	—	December 15, 2001	Socorro	LINEAR	LIX	3.5 km	MPC · JPL
488572	2001 XH_{260}	—	December 10, 2001	Kitt Peak	Spacewatch	PHO	830 m	MPC · JPL
488573	2002 AA_{96}	—	January 8, 2002	Socorro	LINEAR	·	1.3 km	MPC · JPL
488574	2002 AE_{181}	—	December 14, 2001	Socorro	LINEAR	·	1.8 km	MPC · JPL
488575	2002 CZ_{36}	—	February 7, 2002	Socorro	LINEAR	·	1.0 km	MPC · JPL
488576	2002 CF_{214}	—	February 10, 2002	Socorro	LINEAR	·	1.1 km	MPC · JPL
488577	2002 CO_{282}	—	February 8, 2002	Kitt Peak	Spacewatch	·	1.1 km	MPC · JPL
488578	2002 EE_{76}	—	March 10, 2002	Kitt Peak	Spacewatch	(2076)	580 m	MPC · JPL
488579	2002 FQ_{4}	—	March 19, 2002	Haleakala	NEAT	AMO	290 m	MPC · JPL
488580	2002 GK_{8}	—	April 13, 2002	Kitt Peak	Spacewatch	AMO	410 m	MPC · JPL
488581	2002 GX_{172}	—	April 10, 2002	Socorro	LINEAR	·	1.0 km	MPC · JPL
488582	2002 LD_{35}	—	June 9, 2002	Socorro	LINEAR	·	1.5 km	MPC · JPL
488583	2002 NM_{15}	—	July 5, 2002	Socorro	LINEAR	·	2.8 km	MPC · JPL
488584	2002 OX_{32}	—	July 29, 2002	Palomar	NEAT	T_{j} (2.99) · 3:2	3.6 km	MPC · JPL
488585	2002 PM_{5}	—	August 4, 2002	Palomar	NEAT	·	1.7 km	MPC · JPL
488586	2002 PH_{103}	—	August 12, 2002	Socorro	LINEAR	·	1.9 km	MPC · JPL
488587	2002 PH_{130}	—	August 14, 2002	Socorro	LINEAR	·	580 m	MPC · JPL
488588	2002 PM_{191}	—	August 14, 2002	Palomar	NEAT	·	1.2 km	MPC · JPL
488589	2002 PK_{202}	—	October 14, 1998	Socorro	LINEAR	·	1.6 km	MPC · JPL
488590	2002 QE	—	August 12, 2002	Socorro	LINEAR	·	930 m	MPC · JPL
488591	2002 QO_{38}	—	August 30, 2002	Kitt Peak	Spacewatch	·	1.5 km	MPC · JPL
488592	2002 QS_{38}	—	August 30, 2002	Kitt Peak	Spacewatch	MAS	630 m	MPC · JPL
488593	2002 QQ_{69}	—	August 27, 2002	Palomar	NEAT	AEO	820 m	MPC · JPL
488594	2002 QY_{89}	—	October 18, 1999	Kitt Peak	Spacewatch	·	630 m	MPC · JPL
488595	2002 QT_{92}	—	August 19, 2002	Palomar	NEAT	·	520 m	MPC · JPL
488596	2002 QB_{98}	—	August 18, 2002	Palomar	NEAT	·	900 m	MPC · JPL
488597	2002 QQ_{111}	—	August 16, 2002	Haleakala	NEAT	·	1.0 km	MPC · JPL
488598	2002 QL_{124}	—	August 16, 2002	Palomar	NEAT	·	1.3 km	MPC · JPL
488599	2002 QY_{156}	—	October 30, 1994	Kitt Peak	Spacewatch	·	2.6 km	MPC · JPL
488600	2002 RM_{44}	—	September 5, 2002	Socorro	LINEAR	T_{j} (2.96)	5.3 km	MPC · JPL

== 488601–488700 ==
back to top

Designation			Discovery			Properties		Ref
Permanent	Provisional	Named after	Date	Site	Discoverer(s)	Category	Diam.	Ref
488601	2002 RA_{49}	—	September 5, 2002	Socorro	LINEAR	·	3.9 km	MPC · JPL
488602	2002 RV_{49}	—	August 31, 2002	Anderson Mesa	LONEOS	·	840 m	MPC · JPL
488603	2002 RH_{76}	—	September 5, 2002	Socorro	LINEAR	RAF	940 m	MPC · JPL
488604	2002 RW_{112}	—	September 3, 2002	Palomar	NEAT	·	3.6 km	MPC · JPL
488605	2002 RT_{115}	—	September 6, 2002	Socorro	LINEAR	·	550 m	MPC · JPL
488606	2002 RE_{121}	—	September 7, 2002	Socorro	LINEAR	·	2.7 km	MPC · JPL
488607	2002 RS_{189}	—	September 14, 2002	Palomar	NEAT	T_{j} (2.96)	5.1 km	MPC · JPL
488608	2002 RY_{208}	—	September 14, 2002	Palomar	NEAT	MRX	750 m	MPC · JPL
488609	2002 RE_{209}	—	September 14, 2002	Palomar	NEAT	T_{j} (2.99)	2.8 km	MPC · JPL
488610	2002 RQ_{210}	—	September 5, 2002	Socorro	LINEAR	·	1.5 km	MPC · JPL
488611	2002 RU_{254}	—	September 14, 2002	Palomar	NEAT	·	1.2 km	MPC · JPL
488612	2002 RG_{255}	—	September 9, 2002	Palomar	NEAT	·	2.5 km	MPC · JPL
488613	2002 RC_{263}	—	September 13, 2002	Palomar	NEAT	T_{j} (2.97)	3.4 km	MPC · JPL
488614	2002 RT_{267}	—	September 3, 2002	Palomar	NEAT	·	1.3 km	MPC · JPL
488615	2002 SR	—	September 21, 2002	Palomar	NEAT	APO	170 m	MPC · JPL
488616	2002 TZ_{26}	—	October 2, 2002	Socorro	LINEAR	·	1.8 km	MPC · JPL
488617	2002 TP_{93}	—	September 6, 2002	Socorro	LINEAR	·	1.4 km	MPC · JPL
488618	2002 TK_{125}	—	October 4, 2002	Palomar	NEAT	·	1.8 km	MPC · JPL
488619	2002 TW_{208}	—	October 5, 2002	Socorro	LINEAR	·	2.3 km	MPC · JPL
488620	2002 TM_{239}	—	October 9, 2002	Socorro	LINEAR	·	1.9 km	MPC · JPL
488621	2002 TR_{259}	—	October 9, 2002	Socorro	LINEAR	·	1.3 km	MPC · JPL
488622	2002 TN_{292}	—	October 10, 2002	Socorro	LINEAR	H	610 m	MPC · JPL
488623	2002 TF_{298}	—	October 12, 2002	Socorro	LINEAR	·	1.3 km	MPC · JPL
488624	2002 TA_{306}	—	October 4, 2002	Apache Point	SDSS	·	1.9 km	MPC · JPL
488625	2002 TJ_{306}	—	October 4, 2002	Apache Point	SDSS	·	1.1 km	MPC · JPL
488626	2002 TX_{306}	—	October 4, 2002	Apache Point	SDSS	·	2.5 km	MPC · JPL
488627	2002 TX_{310}	—	October 4, 2002	Apache Point	SDSS	BRG	1.6 km	MPC · JPL
488628	2002 TG_{325}	—	October 5, 2002	Apache Point	SDSS	·	580 m	MPC · JPL
488629	2002 TS_{327}	—	May 26, 2001	Kitt Peak	Spacewatch	·	2.3 km	MPC · JPL
488630	2002 TJ_{356}	—	October 10, 2002	Apache Point	SDSS	·	440 m	MPC · JPL
488631	2002 UM_{70}	—	October 25, 2002	Palomar	NEAT	·	930 m	MPC · JPL
488632	2002 UZ_{70}	—	October 30, 2002	Palomar	NEAT	ADE	1.8 km	MPC · JPL
488633	2002 UO_{72}	—	October 16, 2002	Palomar	NEAT	·	1.4 km	MPC · JPL
488634	2002 VY_{88}	—	November 11, 2002	Anderson Mesa	LONEOS	·	3.1 km	MPC · JPL
488635	2002 VH_{90}	—	November 11, 2002	Socorro	LINEAR	·	990 m	MPC · JPL
488636	2002 WY_{12}	—	November 30, 2002	Haleakala	NEAT	AMO	450 m	MPC · JPL
488637	2002 XD_{69}	—	December 13, 2002	Socorro	LINEAR	T_{j} (2.95)	2.9 km	MPC · JPL
488638	2003 AJ_{79}	—	January 11, 2003	Socorro	LINEAR	PHO	1.1 km	MPC · JPL
488639	2003 BJ_{90}	—	January 8, 2003	Socorro	LINEAR	H	580 m	MPC · JPL
488640	2003 FR_{6}	—	March 28, 2003	Kitt Peak	Spacewatch	AMO	510 m	MPC · JPL
488641	2003 FD_{25}	—	March 24, 2003	Kitt Peak	Spacewatch	·	2.5 km	MPC · JPL
488642	2003 FP_{132}	—	March 23, 2003	Kitt Peak	Spacewatch	·	1.2 km	MPC · JPL
488643	2003 GR_{21}	—	April 7, 2003	Kitt Peak	Spacewatch	H	450 m	MPC · JPL
488644	2003 HY_{56}	—	April 26, 2003	Mauna Kea	Mauna Kea	cubewano (cold)	90 km	MPC · JPL
488645	2003 OV	—	July 21, 2003	Haleakala	NEAT	T_{j} (2.99) · APO	730 m	MPC · JPL
488646	2003 QK_{47}	—	August 26, 2003	Socorro	LINEAR	·	420 m	MPC · JPL
488647	2003 QL_{81}	—	August 23, 2003	Cerro Tololo	M. W. Buie	·	820 m	MPC · JPL
488648	2003 SM_{78}	—	September 19, 2003	Kitt Peak	Spacewatch	·	1.3 km	MPC · JPL
488649	2003 SV_{92}	—	September 18, 2003	Kitt Peak	Spacewatch	·	2.4 km	MPC · JPL
488650	2003 SY_{131}	—	September 19, 2003	Kitt Peak	Spacewatch	·	1.3 km	MPC · JPL
488651	2003 SV_{136}	—	September 20, 2003	Kitt Peak	Spacewatch	NEM	2.1 km	MPC · JPL
488652	2003 SL_{138}	—	September 20, 2003	Socorro	LINEAR	·	1.7 km	MPC · JPL
488653	2003 SS_{182}	—	September 20, 2003	Campo Imperatore	CINEOS	·	1.6 km	MPC · JPL
488654	2003 SF_{218}	—	September 27, 2003	Kitt Peak	Spacewatch	·	1.0 km	MPC · JPL
488655	2003 SG_{238}	—	September 19, 2003	Kitt Peak	Spacewatch	·	910 m	MPC · JPL
488656	2003 SW_{239}	—	September 18, 2003	Kitt Peak	Spacewatch	NYS	1.1 km	MPC · JPL
488657	2003 SM_{240}	—	September 27, 2003	Kitt Peak	Spacewatch	LIX	4.2 km	MPC · JPL
488658	2003 SZ_{290}	—	September 29, 2003	Socorro	LINEAR	·	640 m	MPC · JPL
488659	2003 SO_{293}	—	September 17, 2003	Kitt Peak	Spacewatch	·	2.6 km	MPC · JPL
488660	2003 SL_{309}	—	September 27, 2003	Socorro	LINEAR	·	1.7 km	MPC · JPL
488661	2003 SA_{328}	—	September 20, 2003	Campo Imperatore	CINEOS	MAS	510 m	MPC · JPL
488662	2003 SM_{337}	—	September 16, 2003	Kitt Peak	Spacewatch	·	1.6 km	MPC · JPL
488663	2003 SZ_{337}	—	September 22, 2003	Kitt Peak	Spacewatch	·	970 m	MPC · JPL
488664	2003 SZ_{351}	—	September 19, 2003	Kitt Peak	Spacewatch	·	2.4 km	MPC · JPL
488665	2003 SR_{364}	—	September 26, 2003	Apache Point	SDSS	·	1.4 km	MPC · JPL
488666	2003 SL_{410}	—	September 28, 2003	Apache Point	SDSS	·	610 m	MPC · JPL
488667	2003 TZ_{26}	—	October 1, 2003	Kitt Peak	Spacewatch	·	1.7 km	MPC · JPL
488668	2003 TE_{40}	—	October 2, 2003	Kitt Peak	Spacewatch	PHO	700 m	MPC · JPL
488669	2003 UD_{97}	—	October 19, 2003	Kitt Peak	Spacewatch	T_{j} (2.95)	8.1 km	MPC · JPL
488670	2003 UP_{130}	—	October 19, 2003	Palomar	NEAT	·	1.2 km	MPC · JPL
488671	2003 UK_{168}	—	October 22, 2003	Socorro	LINEAR	·	1.8 km	MPC · JPL
488672	2003 UE_{171}	—	October 19, 2003	Kitt Peak	Spacewatch	·	1.5 km	MPC · JPL
488673	2003 UK_{175}	—	October 21, 2003	Anderson Mesa	LONEOS	·	2.6 km	MPC · JPL
488674	2003 UJ_{196}	—	October 21, 2003	Kitt Peak	Spacewatch	·	1.9 km	MPC · JPL
488675	2003 UU_{198}	—	September 28, 2003	Kitt Peak	Spacewatch	·	730 m	MPC · JPL
488676	2003 UT_{235}	—	October 22, 2003	Kitt Peak	Spacewatch	GEF	1.2 km	MPC · JPL
488677	2003 UM_{257}	—	October 23, 2003	Kitt Peak	Spacewatch	GEF	1.2 km	MPC · JPL
488678	2003 US_{276}	—	October 30, 2003	Socorro	LINEAR	·	1.2 km	MPC · JPL
488679	2003 UR_{295}	—	October 16, 2003	Kitt Peak	Spacewatch	·	1.7 km	MPC · JPL
488680	2003 UO_{299}	—	October 16, 2003	Kitt Peak	Spacewatch	·	2.9 km	MPC · JPL
488681	2003 UM_{325}	—	October 17, 2003	Apache Point	SDSS	·	860 m	MPC · JPL
488682	2003 UG_{334}	—	October 18, 2003	Apache Point	SDSS	·	2.4 km	MPC · JPL
488683	2003 UX_{339}	—	October 18, 2003	Kitt Peak	Spacewatch	·	2.0 km	MPC · JPL
488684	2003 UC_{354}	—	October 19, 2003	Apache Point	SDSS	·	1.4 km	MPC · JPL
488685	2003 UK_{391}	—	October 22, 2003	Apache Point	SDSS	·	2.7 km	MPC · JPL
488686	2003 UD_{415}	—	October 19, 2003	Kitt Peak	Spacewatch	·	3.2 km	MPC · JPL
488687	2003 US_{416}	—	October 20, 2003	Kitt Peak	Spacewatch	·	2.4 km	MPC · JPL
488688	2003 WB_{3}	—	November 18, 2003	Catalina	CSS	·	3.7 km	MPC · JPL
488689	2003 WY_{14}	—	November 16, 2003	Kitt Peak	Spacewatch	·	1.3 km	MPC · JPL
488690	2003 WE_{22}	—	November 3, 2003	Socorro	LINEAR	·	1.9 km	MPC · JPL
488691	2003 WN_{24}	—	November 20, 2003	Socorro	LINEAR	H	380 m	MPC · JPL
488692	2003 WW_{56}	—	November 23, 2003	Socorro	LINEAR	H	390 m	MPC · JPL
488693	2003 WW_{87}	—	November 24, 2003	Anderson Mesa	LONEOS	T_{j} (2.8) · AMO +1km	1.5 km	MPC · JPL
488694	2003 WK_{160}	—	November 19, 2003	Socorro	LINEAR	·	1.1 km	MPC · JPL
488695	2003 WL_{187}	—	November 23, 2003	Kitt Peak	M. W. Buie	·	1.6 km	MPC · JPL
488696	2003 WZ_{192}	—	November 23, 2003	Socorro	LINEAR	·	2.4 km	MPC · JPL
488697	2003 XE_{7}	—	December 4, 2003	Socorro	LINEAR	·	1.4 km	MPC · JPL
488698	2003 XV_{10}	—	December 11, 2003	Socorro	LINEAR	APO	420 m	MPC · JPL
488699	2003 XG_{30}	—	December 1, 2003	Kitt Peak	Spacewatch	·	4.2 km	MPC · JPL
488700	2003 YF_{22}	—	December 18, 2003	Socorro	LINEAR	·	1.1 km	MPC · JPL

== 488701–488800 ==
back to top

Designation			Discovery			Properties		Ref
Permanent	Provisional	Named after	Date	Site	Discoverer(s)	Category	Diam.	Ref
488701	2003 YE_{113}	—	December 23, 2003	Socorro	LINEAR	·	1.2 km	MPC · JPL
488702	2003 YU_{117}	—	December 27, 2003	Socorro	LINEAR	·	700 m	MPC · JPL
488703	2004 AC_{19}	—	December 22, 2003	Kitt Peak	Spacewatch	·	3.7 km	MPC · JPL
488704	2004 BY_{50}	—	January 21, 2004	Socorro	LINEAR	·	1.2 km	MPC · JPL
488705	2004 BJ_{54}	—	January 22, 2004	Socorro	LINEAR	·	1.2 km	MPC · JPL
488706	2004 BE_{130}	—	January 16, 2004	Kitt Peak	Spacewatch	·	830 m	MPC · JPL
488707	2004 CM_{2}	—	February 12, 2004	Palomar	NEAT	·	1.6 km	MPC · JPL
488708	2004 CQ_{4}	—	January 22, 2004	Socorro	LINEAR	·	1.5 km	MPC · JPL
488709	2004 CJ_{67}	—	January 31, 2004	Kitt Peak	Spacewatch	·	1.4 km	MPC · JPL
488710	2004 CS_{84}	—	January 30, 2004	Kitt Peak	Spacewatch	EUN	1.4 km	MPC · JPL
488711	2004 CR_{110}	—	January 28, 2004	Socorro	LINEAR	·	1.4 km	MPC · JPL
488712	2004 EY_{27}	—	March 15, 2004	Kitt Peak	Spacewatch	·	1.1 km	MPC · JPL
488713	2004 FF_{23}	—	March 17, 2004	Kitt Peak	Spacewatch	·	1.3 km	MPC · JPL
488714	2004 FH_{56}	—	March 16, 2004	Socorro	LINEAR	·	1.4 km	MPC · JPL
488715	2004 FT_{86}	—	March 15, 2004	Kitt Peak	Spacewatch	JUN	1.1 km	MPC · JPL
488716	2004 FK_{102}	—	March 15, 2004	Catalina	CSS	·	1.4 km	MPC · JPL
488717	2004 FE_{119}	—	March 15, 2004	Kitt Peak	Spacewatch	·	610 m	MPC · JPL
488718	2004 FZ_{147}	—	March 16, 2004	Siding Spring	SSS	·	1.7 km	MPC · JPL
488719	2004 GU_{13}	—	March 26, 2004	Socorro	LINEAR	·	1.3 km	MPC · JPL
488720	2004 GC_{49}	—	April 12, 2004	Kitt Peak	Spacewatch	·	1.2 km	MPC · JPL
488721	2004 GY_{76}	—	April 12, 2004	Catalina	CSS	H	660 m	MPC · JPL
488722	2004 HS_{24}	—	April 19, 2004	Kitt Peak	Spacewatch	·	1.7 km	MPC · JPL
488723	2004 JD_{43}	—	May 15, 2004	Socorro	LINEAR	PHO	1.1 km	MPC · JPL
488724	2004 OR_{11}	—	July 11, 2004	Socorro	LINEAR	(883)	650 m	MPC · JPL
488725	2004 PP_{104}	—	August 15, 2004	Siding Spring	SSS	·	2.4 km	MPC · JPL
488726	2004 PZ_{104}	—	August 12, 2004	Socorro	LINEAR	·	700 m	MPC · JPL
488727	2004 PL_{107}	—	August 12, 2004	Campo Imperatore	CINEOS	·	1.5 km	MPC · JPL
488728	2004 QR_{27}	—	August 27, 2004	Anderson Mesa	LONEOS	·	1.0 km	MPC · JPL
488729	2004 RU_{16}	—	August 21, 2004	Catalina	CSS	·	580 m	MPC · JPL
488730	2004 RR_{20}	—	September 7, 2004	Kitt Peak	Spacewatch	·	850 m	MPC · JPL
488731	2004 RL_{25}	—	September 7, 2004	Socorro	LINEAR	·	1.4 km	MPC · JPL
488732	2004 RO_{25}	—	August 8, 2004	Campo Imperatore	CINEOS	·	750 m	MPC · JPL
488733	2004 RX_{41}	—	September 7, 2004	Kitt Peak	Spacewatch	·	850 m	MPC · JPL
488734	2004 RR_{57}	—	August 25, 2004	Kitt Peak	Spacewatch	·	1.5 km	MPC · JPL
488735	2004 RP_{108}	—	September 9, 2004	Kitt Peak	Spacewatch	·	680 m	MPC · JPL
488736	2004 RG_{112}	—	August 26, 2004	Anderson Mesa	LONEOS	·	960 m	MPC · JPL
488737	2004 RE_{124}	—	September 7, 2004	Socorro	LINEAR	slow	2.2 km	MPC · JPL
488738	2004 RM_{162}	—	September 11, 2004	Socorro	LINEAR	·	610 m	MPC · JPL
488739	2004 RQ_{183}	—	August 13, 2004	Socorro	LINEAR	H	590 m	MPC · JPL
488740	2004 RC_{186}	—	September 10, 2004	Socorro	LINEAR	·	810 m	MPC · JPL
488741	2004 RP_{213}	—	September 11, 2004	Socorro	LINEAR	THB	3.0 km	MPC · JPL
488742	2004 RF_{249}	—	September 12, 2004	Socorro	LINEAR	T_{j} (2.99)	3.7 km	MPC · JPL
488743	2004 RO_{251}	—	September 14, 2004	Siding Spring	SSS	H	490 m	MPC · JPL
488744	2004 RT_{254}	—	September 6, 2004	Palomar	NEAT	·	1.0 km	MPC · JPL
488745	2004 RJ_{291}	—	September 10, 2004	Socorro	LINEAR	·	2.4 km	MPC · JPL
488746	2004 RX_{335}	—	September 15, 2004	Kitt Peak	Spacewatch	·	870 m	MPC · JPL
488747	2004 RM_{346}	—	September 10, 2004	Socorro	LINEAR	·	560 m	MPC · JPL
488748	2004 SM_{1}	—	September 8, 2004	Socorro	LINEAR	·	710 m	MPC · JPL
488749	2004 SH_{9}	—	September 18, 2004	Socorro	LINEAR	·	1.0 km	MPC · JPL
488750	2004 SR_{25}	—	September 22, 2004	Desert Eagle	W. K. Y. Yeung	V	720 m	MPC · JPL
488751	2004 SX_{31}	—	September 17, 2004	Socorro	LINEAR	·	1.7 km	MPC · JPL
488752	2004 SH_{36}	—	August 25, 2004	Kitt Peak	Spacewatch	CLO	1.5 km	MPC · JPL
488753	2004 SU_{40}	—	September 17, 2004	Anderson Mesa	LONEOS	PHO	910 m	MPC · JPL
488754	2004 SS_{47}	—	September 18, 2004	Socorro	LINEAR	·	900 m	MPC · JPL
488755	2004 SU_{47}	—	September 10, 2004	Socorro	LINEAR	·	1.3 km	MPC · JPL
488756	2004 TM	—	October 4, 2004	Kitt Peak	Spacewatch	·	1.2 km	MPC · JPL
488757	2004 TY_{3}	—	September 23, 2004	Kitt Peak	Spacewatch	V	510 m	MPC · JPL
488758	2004 TA_{31}	—	October 4, 2004	Anderson Mesa	LONEOS	(5)	1.0 km	MPC · JPL
488759	2004 TO_{35}	—	September 7, 2004	Kitt Peak	Spacewatch	·	970 m	MPC · JPL
488760	2004 TP_{38}	—	September 22, 2004	Kitt Peak	Spacewatch	·	1.4 km	MPC · JPL
488761	2004 TD_{58}	—	October 5, 2004	Kitt Peak	Spacewatch	MAS	580 m	MPC · JPL
488762	2004 TW_{62}	—	September 7, 2004	Kitt Peak	Spacewatch	·	1.9 km	MPC · JPL
488763	2004 TM_{82}	—	September 18, 2004	Socorro	LINEAR	·	1.3 km	MPC · JPL
488764	2004 TJ_{83}	—	October 5, 2004	Kitt Peak	Spacewatch	NYS	650 m	MPC · JPL
488765	2004 TY_{87}	—	September 14, 2004	Socorro	LINEAR	·	3.4 km	MPC · JPL
488766	2004 TW_{135}	—	October 8, 2004	Anderson Mesa	LONEOS	·	1.2 km	MPC · JPL
488767	2004 TM_{139}	—	October 9, 2004	Anderson Mesa	LONEOS	·	1.8 km	MPC · JPL
488768	2004 TT_{145}	—	October 5, 2004	Kitt Peak	Spacewatch	V	610 m	MPC · JPL
488769	2004 TJ_{170}	—	October 7, 2004	Socorro	LINEAR	·	1.1 km	MPC · JPL
488770	2004 TC_{199}	—	October 7, 2004	Kitt Peak	Spacewatch	·	2.5 km	MPC · JPL
488771	2004 TL_{212}	—	October 4, 2004	Kitt Peak	Spacewatch	MAS	620 m	MPC · JPL
488772	2004 TJ_{214}	—	September 17, 2004	Kitt Peak	Spacewatch	MAS	560 m	MPC · JPL
488773	2004 TQ_{215}	—	October 10, 2004	Kitt Peak	Spacewatch	·	2.0 km	MPC · JPL
488774	2004 TU_{220}	—	September 15, 2004	Kitt Peak	Spacewatch	·	1.4 km	MPC · JPL
488775	2004 TD_{246}	—	October 7, 2004	Kitt Peak	Spacewatch	·	1.4 km	MPC · JPL
488776	2004 TA_{277}	—	October 9, 2004	Kitt Peak	Spacewatch	NYS	930 m	MPC · JPL
488777	2004 TX_{287}	—	October 9, 2004	Socorro	LINEAR	·	3.1 km	MPC · JPL
488778	2004 TD_{291}	—	October 10, 2004	Kitt Peak	Spacewatch	·	810 m	MPC · JPL
488779	2004 TX_{298}	—	October 13, 2004	Kitt Peak	Spacewatch	·	1.0 km	MPC · JPL
488780	2004 TV_{334}	—	October 10, 2004	Kitt Peak	Spacewatch	·	740 m	MPC · JPL
488781	2004 TW_{337}	—	October 4, 2004	Kitt Peak	Spacewatch	·	2.1 km	MPC · JPL
488782	2004 VM_{30}	—	October 23, 2004	Kitt Peak	Spacewatch	·	1.4 km	MPC · JPL
488783	2004 VP_{55}	—	October 11, 2004	Kitt Peak	Spacewatch	·	1.7 km	MPC · JPL
488784	2004 VB_{76}	—	October 8, 2004	Anderson Mesa	LONEOS	·	2.1 km	MPC · JPL
488785	2004 WR_{1}	—	November 17, 2004	Campo Imperatore	CINEOS	EUN	930 m	MPC · JPL
488786	2004 XV_{3}	—	December 4, 2004	Bareggio	Bareggio	·	1.3 km	MPC · JPL
488787	2004 XZ_{24}	—	December 9, 2004	Kitt Peak	Spacewatch	·	1.6 km	MPC · JPL
488788	2004 XF_{42}	—	September 24, 2004	Socorro	LINEAR	·	660 m	MPC · JPL
488789	2004 XK_{50}	—	December 14, 2004	Anderson Mesa	LONEOS	APO +1km · PHA	1.0 km	MPC · JPL
488790	2004 XP_{75}	—	December 9, 2004	Catalina	CSS	·	2.0 km	MPC · JPL
488791	2004 XG_{130}	—	December 15, 2004	Socorro	LINEAR	·	1.8 km	MPC · JPL
488792	2004 XX_{159}	—	December 14, 2004	Kitt Peak	Spacewatch	·	2.0 km	MPC · JPL
488793	2005 AZ_{31}	—	January 1, 2005	Catalina	CSS	·	1.2 km	MPC · JPL
488794	2005 AQ_{34}	—	January 13, 2005	Kitt Peak	Spacewatch	T_{j} (2.98)	4.2 km	MPC · JPL
488795	2005 AR_{48}	—	January 13, 2005	Kitt Peak	Spacewatch	·	3.8 km	MPC · JPL
488796	2005 AN_{55}	—	December 18, 2004	Kitt Peak	Spacewatch	·	2.9 km	MPC · JPL
488797	2005 CF_{20}	—	February 2, 2005	Catalina	CSS	·	1.0 km	MPC · JPL
488798	2005 EN_{18}	—	March 3, 2005	Kitt Peak	Spacewatch	·	1.5 km	MPC · JPL
488799	2005 EE_{38}	—	March 8, 2005	Anderson Mesa	LONEOS	·	700 m	MPC · JPL
488800	2005 EJ_{89}	—	March 8, 2005	Kitt Peak	Spacewatch	·	880 m	MPC · JPL

== 488801–488900 ==
back to top

Designation			Discovery			Properties		Ref
Permanent	Provisional	Named after	Date	Site	Discoverer(s)	Category	Diam.	Ref
488801	2005 ES_{156}	—	March 9, 2005	Catalina	CSS	·	1.0 km	MPC · JPL
488802	2005 ED_{174}	—	March 8, 2005	Kitt Peak	Spacewatch	·	3.5 km	MPC · JPL
488803	2005 GB_{120}	—	April 12, 2005	Anderson Mesa	LONEOS	ATE	210 m	MPC · JPL
488804	2005 GK_{163}	—	April 10, 2005	Mount Lemmon	Mount Lemmon Survey	·	1.3 km	MPC · JPL
488805	2005 GW_{177}	—	April 2, 2005	Mount Lemmon	Mount Lemmon Survey	·	890 m	MPC · JPL
488806	2005 GW_{201}	—	April 4, 2005	Mount Lemmon	Mount Lemmon Survey	·	900 m	MPC · JPL
488807	2005 JN_{8}	—	May 4, 2005	Mauna Kea	Veillet, C.	·	3.5 km	MPC · JPL
488808	2005 JZ_{8}	—	May 4, 2005	Mauna Kea	Veillet, C.	·	1.8 km	MPC · JPL
488809	2005 JM_{69}	—	May 6, 2005	Kitt Peak	Spacewatch	·	1.1 km	MPC · JPL
488810	2005 JP_{83}	—	May 8, 2005	Kitt Peak	Spacewatch	·	870 m	MPC · JPL
488811	2005 JX_{97}	—	May 8, 2005	Kitt Peak	Spacewatch	EUN	1.3 km	MPC · JPL
488812	2005 JG_{106}	—	May 3, 2005	Kitt Peak	Spacewatch	·	1.7 km	MPC · JPL
488813	2005 JJ_{162}	—	May 4, 2005	Kitt Peak	Spacewatch	·	1.1 km	MPC · JPL
488814	2005 KX_{4}	—	May 8, 2005	Mount Lemmon	Mount Lemmon Survey	·	1.5 km	MPC · JPL
488815	2005 LF_{47}	—	June 13, 2005	Mount Lemmon	Mount Lemmon Survey	·	2.0 km	MPC · JPL
488816	2005 LD_{52}	—	June 15, 2005	Mount Lemmon	Mount Lemmon Survey	·	1.1 km	MPC · JPL
488817	2005 MY_{17}	—	June 27, 2005	Kitt Peak	Spacewatch	·	2.3 km	MPC · JPL
488818	2005 MM_{27}	—	June 29, 2005	Kitt Peak	Spacewatch	·	1.1 km	MPC · JPL
488819	2005 MB_{50}	—	June 30, 2005	Kitt Peak	Spacewatch	·	2.0 km	MPC · JPL
488820	2005 NF_{6}	—	July 4, 2005	Kitt Peak	Spacewatch	·	3.1 km	MPC · JPL
488821	2005 NR_{14}	—	July 2, 2005	Kitt Peak	Spacewatch	JUN	970 m	MPC · JPL
488822	2005 NC_{16}	—	July 2, 2005	Kitt Peak	Spacewatch	·	1.8 km	MPC · JPL
488823	2005 NT_{16}	—	July 2, 2005	Kitt Peak	Spacewatch	NYS	740 m	MPC · JPL
488824	2005 NF_{26}	—	July 5, 2005	Kitt Peak	Spacewatch	·	1.4 km	MPC · JPL
488825	2005 NL_{30}	—	July 4, 2005	Kitt Peak	Spacewatch	·	970 m	MPC · JPL
488826	2005 NM_{58}	—	July 6, 2005	Kitt Peak	Spacewatch	·	1.4 km	MPC · JPL
488827	2005 NY_{79}	—	July 5, 2005	Siding Spring	SSS	·	1.3 km	MPC · JPL
488828	2005 OU_{26}	—	July 18, 2005	Palomar	NEAT	H	500 m	MPC · JPL
488829	2005 PN_{10}	—	August 4, 2005	Palomar	NEAT	·	1.1 km	MPC · JPL
488830	2005 QJ_{11}	—	August 26, 2005	Anderson Mesa	LONEOS	·	1.3 km	MPC · JPL
488831	2005 QG_{34}	—	August 25, 2005	Palomar	NEAT	NYS	740 m	MPC · JPL
488832	2005 QX_{35}	—	August 25, 2005	Palomar	NEAT	(1547)	1.8 km	MPC · JPL
488833	2005 QT_{55}	—	August 28, 2005	Kitt Peak	Spacewatch	NYS	910 m	MPC · JPL
488834	2005 QV_{60}	—	August 26, 2005	Palomar	NEAT	·	1.5 km	MPC · JPL
488835	2005 QA_{71}	—	August 29, 2005	Anderson Mesa	LONEOS	·	1.3 km	MPC · JPL
488836	2005 QW_{72}	—	August 29, 2005	Kitt Peak	Spacewatch	·	1.7 km	MPC · JPL
488837	2005 QD_{81}	—	August 29, 2005	Kitt Peak	Spacewatch	·	490 m	MPC · JPL
488838	2005 QH_{87}	—	August 31, 2005	Socorro	LINEAR	·	2.0 km	MPC · JPL
488839	2005 QU_{102}	—	August 27, 2005	Palomar	NEAT	JUN	970 m	MPC · JPL
488840	2005 QW_{109}	—	August 27, 2005	Palomar	NEAT	MAS	420 m	MPC · JPL
488841	2005 QD_{121}	—	August 28, 2005	Kitt Peak	Spacewatch	·	1.6 km	MPC · JPL
488842	2005 QY_{175}	—	August 31, 2005	Palomar	NEAT	H	420 m	MPC · JPL
488843	2005 QM_{177}	—	August 28, 2005	Kitt Peak	Spacewatch	·	1.7 km	MPC · JPL
488844	2005 QD_{188}	—	August 30, 2005	Kitt Peak	Spacewatch	·	2.3 km	MPC · JPL
488845	2005 QE_{188}	—	August 30, 2005	Kitt Peak	Spacewatch	·	1.6 km	MPC · JPL
488846	2005 RE_{25}	—	September 10, 2005	Anderson Mesa	LONEOS	·	1.8 km	MPC · JPL
488847	2005 RD_{27}	—	September 10, 2005	Anderson Mesa	LONEOS	(18466)	2.7 km	MPC · JPL
488848	2005 RR_{28}	—	August 31, 2005	Kitt Peak	Spacewatch	·	1.9 km	MPC · JPL
488849	2005 SL_{1}	—	August 27, 2005	Anderson Mesa	LONEOS	·	1.5 km	MPC · JPL
488850	2005 SC_{3}	—	September 23, 2005	Catalina	CSS	·	660 m	MPC · JPL
488851	2005 SL_{16}	—	September 26, 2005	Kitt Peak	Spacewatch	·	1.6 km	MPC · JPL
488852	2005 SX_{17}	—	September 26, 2005	Kitt Peak	Spacewatch	·	560 m	MPC · JPL
488853	2005 SH_{28}	—	September 23, 2005	Kitt Peak	Spacewatch	·	2.7 km	MPC · JPL
488854	2005 SJ_{44}	—	September 24, 2005	Kitt Peak	Spacewatch	·	1.2 km	MPC · JPL
488855	2005 SP_{46}	—	September 24, 2005	Kitt Peak	Spacewatch	·	720 m	MPC · JPL
488856	2005 SM_{53}	—	September 25, 2005	Kitt Peak	Spacewatch	·	1.4 km	MPC · JPL
488857	2005 SW_{54}	—	September 25, 2005	Kitt Peak	Spacewatch	·	610 m	MPC · JPL
488858	2005 SF_{60}	—	September 26, 2005	Kitt Peak	Spacewatch	·	710 m	MPC · JPL
488859	2005 SK_{61}	—	September 26, 2005	Kitt Peak	Spacewatch	AGN	1.1 km	MPC · JPL
488860	2005 ST_{67}	—	September 27, 2005	Kitt Peak	Spacewatch	NYS	920 m	MPC · JPL
488861	2005 SB_{80}	—	September 24, 2005	Kitt Peak	Spacewatch	·	1.3 km	MPC · JPL
488862	2005 SK_{84}	—	September 24, 2005	Kitt Peak	Spacewatch	·	1.7 km	MPC · JPL
488863	2005 SP_{85}	—	September 24, 2005	Kitt Peak	Spacewatch	·	2.3 km	MPC · JPL
488864	2005 SB_{91}	—	September 24, 2005	Kitt Peak	Spacewatch	·	900 m	MPC · JPL
488865	2005 SM_{95}	—	September 25, 2005	Kitt Peak	Spacewatch	·	1.1 km	MPC · JPL
488866	2005 SV_{100}	—	September 25, 2005	Kitt Peak	Spacewatch	·	3.1 km	MPC · JPL
488867	2005 SG_{110}	—	September 26, 2005	Palomar	NEAT	MAS	660 m	MPC · JPL
488868	2005 ST_{111}	—	September 26, 2005	Kitt Peak	Spacewatch	H	460 m	MPC · JPL
488869	2005 SR_{121}	—	September 29, 2005	Kitt Peak	Spacewatch	·	2.3 km	MPC · JPL
488870	2005 SH_{127}	—	September 29, 2005	Mount Lemmon	Mount Lemmon Survey	·	1.8 km	MPC · JPL
488871	2005 SM_{127}	—	September 29, 2005	Mount Lemmon	Mount Lemmon Survey	·	900 m	MPC · JPL
488872	2005 SH_{134}	—	September 30, 2005	Palomar	NEAT	H	460 m	MPC · JPL
488873	2005 SR_{137}	—	September 24, 2005	Kitt Peak	Spacewatch	·	900 m	MPC · JPL
488874	2005 SG_{138}	—	September 25, 2005	Palomar	NEAT	·	1.6 km	MPC · JPL
488875	2005 SR_{138}	—	September 25, 2005	Kitt Peak	Spacewatch	·	440 m	MPC · JPL
488876	2005 SO_{153}	—	September 26, 2005	Kitt Peak	Spacewatch	·	2.4 km	MPC · JPL
488877	2005 SX_{161}	—	September 27, 2005	Kitt Peak	Spacewatch	·	540 m	MPC · JPL
488878	2005 SM_{164}	—	September 27, 2005	Palomar	NEAT	·	1.2 km	MPC · JPL
488879	2005 SK_{171}	—	September 1, 2005	Campo Imperatore	CINEOS	V	610 m	MPC · JPL
488880	2005 SW_{175}	—	September 29, 2005	Kitt Peak	Spacewatch	·	880 m	MPC · JPL
488881	2005 SJ_{177}	—	September 29, 2005	Kitt Peak	Spacewatch	·	1.6 km	MPC · JPL
488882	2005 SD_{184}	—	September 29, 2005	Kitt Peak	Spacewatch	NYS	790 m	MPC · JPL
488883	2005 SK_{222}	—	August 29, 2005	Socorro	LINEAR	·	880 m	MPC · JPL
488884	2005 SU_{231}	—	September 30, 2005	Mount Lemmon	Mount Lemmon Survey	·	1.7 km	MPC · JPL
488885	2005 ST_{233}	—	September 30, 2005	Mount Lemmon	Mount Lemmon Survey	MAS	520 m	MPC · JPL
488886	2005 SF_{240}	—	September 30, 2005	Kitt Peak	Spacewatch	·	760 m	MPC · JPL
488887	2005 SG_{243}	—	September 24, 2005	Kitt Peak	Spacewatch	H	460 m	MPC · JPL
488888	2005 SP_{243}	—	September 25, 2005	Kitt Peak	Spacewatch	615	1.2 km	MPC · JPL
488889	2005 SM_{247}	—	September 30, 2005	Kitt Peak	Spacewatch	·	480 m	MPC · JPL
488890	2005 SZ_{252}	—	September 23, 2005	Kitt Peak	Spacewatch	·	600 m	MPC · JPL
488891	2005 SE_{254}	—	August 29, 2005	Kitt Peak	Spacewatch	·	830 m	MPC · JPL
488892	2005 SC_{281}	—	September 29, 2005	Kitt Peak	Spacewatch	·	960 m	MPC · JPL
488893	2005 TG_{40}	—	October 1, 2005	Kitt Peak	Spacewatch	·	870 m	MPC · JPL
488894	2005 TY_{41}	—	September 23, 2005	Kitt Peak	Spacewatch	·	450 m	MPC · JPL
488895	2005 TC_{50}	—	September 29, 2005	Kitt Peak	Spacewatch	·	970 m	MPC · JPL
488896	2005 TF_{60}	—	October 3, 2005	Kitt Peak	Spacewatch	·	1.5 km	MPC · JPL
488897	2005 TB_{61}	—	September 1, 2005	Kitt Peak	Spacewatch	·	1.7 km	MPC · JPL
488898	2005 TS_{62}	—	October 4, 2005	Mount Lemmon	Mount Lemmon Survey	·	760 m	MPC · JPL
488899	2005 TD_{63}	—	October 4, 2005	Mount Lemmon	Mount Lemmon Survey	V	470 m	MPC · JPL
488900	2005 TD_{64}	—	October 6, 2005	Catalina	CSS	·	550 m	MPC · JPL

== 488901–489000 ==
back to top

Designation			Discovery			Properties		Ref
Permanent	Provisional	Named after	Date	Site	Discoverer(s)	Category	Diam.	Ref
488901	2005 TQ_{78}	—	October 7, 2005	Mount Lemmon	Mount Lemmon Survey	·	680 m	MPC · JPL
488902	2005 TS_{80}	—	September 29, 2005	Kitt Peak	Spacewatch	·	1.8 km	MPC · JPL
488903	2005 TN_{81}	—	October 3, 2005	Kitt Peak	Spacewatch	·	1.3 km	MPC · JPL
488904	2005 TG_{82}	—	September 23, 2005	Kitt Peak	Spacewatch	·	570 m	MPC · JPL
488905	2005 TC_{89}	—	October 5, 2005	Mount Lemmon	Mount Lemmon Survey	THM	1.7 km	MPC · JPL
488906	2005 TP_{92}	—	September 25, 2005	Kitt Peak	Spacewatch	·	810 m	MPC · JPL
488907	2005 TX_{100}	—	September 26, 2005	Kitt Peak	Spacewatch	·	530 m	MPC · JPL
488908	2005 TE_{102}	—	October 7, 2005	Mount Lemmon	Mount Lemmon Survey	·	720 m	MPC · JPL
488909	2005 TV_{102}	—	September 29, 2005	Kitt Peak	Spacewatch	·	980 m	MPC · JPL
488910	2005 TF_{111}	—	October 7, 2005	Kitt Peak	Spacewatch	·	1.0 km	MPC · JPL
488911	2005 TT_{119}	—	September 26, 2005	Kitt Peak	Spacewatch	V	460 m	MPC · JPL
488912	2005 TR_{136}	—	September 25, 2005	Kitt Peak	Spacewatch	·	1.6 km	MPC · JPL
488913	2005 TK_{142}	—	September 14, 2005	Catalina	CSS	·	2.2 km	MPC · JPL
488914	2005 TE_{170}	—	October 1, 2005	Mount Lemmon	Mount Lemmon Survey	·	2.4 km	MPC · JPL
488915	2005 TW_{170}	—	October 12, 2005	Kitt Peak	Spacewatch	·	1.6 km	MPC · JPL
488916	2005 TT_{190}	—	October 1, 2005	Kitt Peak	Spacewatch	·	1.6 km	MPC · JPL
488917	2005 UM_{1}	—	October 20, 2005	Junk Bond	D. Healy	·	990 m	MPC · JPL
488918	2005 UG_{2}	—	September 29, 2005	Mount Lemmon	Mount Lemmon Survey	·	2.5 km	MPC · JPL
488919	2005 UB_{5}	—	October 25, 2005	Kitt Peak	Spacewatch	·	2.2 km	MPC · JPL
488920	2005 UQ_{9}	—	October 21, 2005	Palomar	NEAT	·	1.8 km	MPC · JPL
488921	2005 UN_{22}	—	October 23, 2005	Kitt Peak	Spacewatch	EUN	1.4 km	MPC · JPL
488922	2005 UT_{22}	—	October 5, 2005	Kitt Peak	Spacewatch	·	630 m	MPC · JPL
488923	2005 UE_{33}	—	October 24, 2005	Kitt Peak	Spacewatch	·	1.7 km	MPC · JPL
488924	2005 UZ_{38}	—	October 24, 2005	Kitt Peak	Spacewatch	MAS	560 m	MPC · JPL
488925	2005 UA_{47}	—	October 22, 2005	Kitt Peak	Spacewatch	·	1.2 km	MPC · JPL
488926	2005 UL_{49}	—	October 8, 2005	Socorro	LINEAR	·	2.2 km	MPC · JPL
488927	2005 UP_{63}	—	October 25, 2005	Mount Lemmon	Mount Lemmon Survey	THM	2.3 km	MPC · JPL
488928	2005 UR_{65}	—	October 22, 2005	Kitt Peak	Spacewatch	·	1.3 km	MPC · JPL
488929	2005 UG_{74}	—	October 23, 2005	Catalina	CSS	·	2.5 km	MPC · JPL
488930	2005 UM_{76}	—	October 24, 2005	Palomar	NEAT	·	2.0 km	MPC · JPL
488931	2005 UG_{87}	—	October 22, 2005	Kitt Peak	Spacewatch	·	1.6 km	MPC · JPL
488932	2005 UJ_{91}	—	October 22, 2005	Kitt Peak	Spacewatch	(2076)	750 m	MPC · JPL
488933	2005 UH_{96}	—	October 22, 2005	Kitt Peak	Spacewatch	·	1.7 km	MPC · JPL
488934	2005 UZ_{101}	—	October 22, 2005	Kitt Peak	Spacewatch	·	830 m	MPC · JPL
488935	2005 UC_{103}	—	October 22, 2005	Kitt Peak	Spacewatch	·	730 m	MPC · JPL
488936	2005 UV_{113}	—	October 22, 2005	Kitt Peak	Spacewatch	NYS	930 m	MPC · JPL
488937	2005 UM_{120}	—	October 24, 2005	Kitt Peak	Spacewatch	·	1.4 km	MPC · JPL
488938	2005 UG_{137}	—	October 11, 2005	Kitt Peak	Spacewatch	·	870 m	MPC · JPL
488939	2005 UV_{138}	—	October 25, 2005	Kitt Peak	Spacewatch	BRA	1.3 km	MPC · JPL
488940	2005 UL_{141}	—	October 25, 2005	Catalina	CSS	H	530 m	MPC · JPL
488941	2005 UT_{145}	—	October 26, 2005	Kitt Peak	Spacewatch	·	1.2 km	MPC · JPL
488942	2005 UX_{146}	—	October 26, 2005	Kitt Peak	Spacewatch	·	650 m	MPC · JPL
488943	2005 UL_{147}	—	October 26, 2005	Kitt Peak	Spacewatch	·	740 m	MPC · JPL
488944	2005 UO_{163}	—	September 29, 2005	Kitt Peak	Spacewatch	·	990 m	MPC · JPL
488945	2005 UF_{164}	—	September 30, 2005	Mount Lemmon	Mount Lemmon Survey	NYS	680 m	MPC · JPL
488946	2005 UB_{165}	—	October 1, 2005	Mount Lemmon	Mount Lemmon Survey	·	920 m	MPC · JPL
488947	2005 UN_{167}	—	October 24, 2005	Kitt Peak	Spacewatch	·	1.4 km	MPC · JPL
488948	2005 UF_{169}	—	October 24, 2005	Kitt Peak	Spacewatch	HOF	2.3 km	MPC · JPL
488949	2005 UQ_{169}	—	September 30, 2005	Mount Lemmon	Mount Lemmon Survey	·	1.3 km	MPC · JPL
488950	2005 UQ_{170}	—	October 24, 2005	Kitt Peak	Spacewatch	MAS	530 m	MPC · JPL
488951	2005 UK_{175}	—	October 24, 2005	Kitt Peak	Spacewatch	·	2.9 km	MPC · JPL
488952	2005 UR_{182}	—	October 24, 2005	Kitt Peak	Spacewatch	·	790 m	MPC · JPL
488953	2005 UK_{185}	—	October 25, 2005	Mount Lemmon	Mount Lemmon Survey	·	520 m	MPC · JPL
488954	2005 UU_{192}	—	October 22, 2005	Kitt Peak	Spacewatch	·	1.6 km	MPC · JPL
488955	2005 UZ_{193}	—	September 29, 2005	Mount Lemmon	Mount Lemmon Survey	HOF	2.2 km	MPC · JPL
488956	2005 UD_{198}	—	September 25, 2005	Kitt Peak	Spacewatch	·	480 m	MPC · JPL
488957	2005 UG_{211}	—	October 27, 2005	Kitt Peak	Spacewatch	AGN	960 m	MPC · JPL
488958	2005 UK_{222}	—	October 25, 2005	Kitt Peak	Spacewatch	V	480 m	MPC · JPL
488959	2005 UQ_{226}	—	October 25, 2005	Kitt Peak	Spacewatch	MAS	530 m	MPC · JPL
488960	2005 UF_{229}	—	October 25, 2005	Kitt Peak	Spacewatch	·	1.6 km	MPC · JPL
488961	2005 UC_{248}	—	October 28, 2005	Mount Lemmon	Mount Lemmon Survey	THM	1.9 km	MPC · JPL
488962	2005 UP_{252}	—	October 26, 2005	Kitt Peak	Spacewatch	·	1.0 km	MPC · JPL
488963	2005 UM_{254}	—	October 22, 2005	Kitt Peak	Spacewatch	MAS	610 m	MPC · JPL
488964	2005 UP_{262}	—	October 26, 2005	Kitt Peak	Spacewatch	·	2.6 km	MPC · JPL
488965	2005 UR_{269}	—	October 12, 2005	Kitt Peak	Spacewatch	·	1.6 km	MPC · JPL
488966	2005 UF_{270}	—	October 1, 2005	Kitt Peak	Spacewatch	·	1.1 km	MPC · JPL
488967	2005 UO_{285}	—	October 26, 2005	Kitt Peak	Spacewatch	·	1.3 km	MPC · JPL
488968	2005 UY_{286}	—	October 26, 2005	Kitt Peak	Spacewatch	·	550 m	MPC · JPL
488969	2005 UC_{287}	—	October 26, 2005	Kitt Peak	Spacewatch	·	610 m	MPC · JPL
488970	2005 UK_{291}	—	October 26, 2005	Kitt Peak	Spacewatch	·	1.4 km	MPC · JPL
488971	2005 UY_{296}	—	October 26, 2005	Kitt Peak	Spacewatch	·	1.6 km	MPC · JPL
488972	2005 UD_{313}	—	October 29, 2005	Catalina	CSS	·	2.2 km	MPC · JPL
488973	2005 UC_{324}	—	October 29, 2005	Kitt Peak	Spacewatch	HOF	2.0 km	MPC · JPL
488974	2005 UQ_{324}	—	October 29, 2005	Kitt Peak	Spacewatch	·	1.9 km	MPC · JPL
488975	2005 UL_{333}	—	October 22, 2005	Kitt Peak	Spacewatch	·	1.6 km	MPC · JPL
488976	2005 UZ_{334}	—	October 29, 2005	Mount Lemmon	Mount Lemmon Survey	·	800 m	MPC · JPL
488977	2005 UO_{342}	—	October 22, 2005	Kitt Peak	Spacewatch	·	2.4 km	MPC · JPL
488978	2005 UA_{351}	—	October 8, 2005	Socorro	LINEAR	·	1.1 km	MPC · JPL
488979	2005 UB_{352}	—	October 29, 2005	Catalina	CSS	·	1.5 km	MPC · JPL
488980	2005 UG_{353}	—	October 29, 2005	Catalina	CSS	T_{j} (2.98)	3.0 km	MPC · JPL
488981	2005 UQ_{358}	—	September 29, 2005	Mount Lemmon	Mount Lemmon Survey	·	1.8 km	MPC · JPL
488982	2005 US_{358}	—	September 30, 2005	Mount Lemmon	Mount Lemmon Survey	·	1.3 km	MPC · JPL
488983	2005 UW_{358}	—	October 10, 2005	Kitt Peak	Spacewatch	·	790 m	MPC · JPL
488984	2005 UP_{359}	—	October 25, 2005	Kitt Peak	Spacewatch	·	2.0 km	MPC · JPL
488985	2005 UW_{360}	—	September 29, 2005	Mount Lemmon	Mount Lemmon Survey	·	910 m	MPC · JPL
488986	2005 UG_{365}	—	October 27, 2005	Kitt Peak	Spacewatch	·	1.9 km	MPC · JPL
488987	2005 UA_{367}	—	October 27, 2005	Kitt Peak	Spacewatch	·	630 m	MPC · JPL
488988	2005 UV_{373}	—	October 22, 2005	Kitt Peak	Spacewatch	·	540 m	MPC · JPL
488989	2005 UH_{382}	—	October 26, 2005	Socorro	LINEAR	JUN	1.2 km	MPC · JPL
488990	2005 UC_{384}	—	October 27, 2005	Kitt Peak	Spacewatch	·	960 m	MPC · JPL
488991	2005 UE_{387}	—	October 22, 2005	Kitt Peak	Spacewatch	·	1.5 km	MPC · JPL
488992	2005 UC_{395}	—	October 30, 2005	Mount Lemmon	Mount Lemmon Survey	·	600 m	MPC · JPL
488993	2005 UJ_{405}	—	October 29, 2005	Mount Lemmon	Mount Lemmon Survey	·	610 m	MPC · JPL
488994	2005 UF_{434}	—	October 25, 2005	Kitt Peak	Spacewatch	·	1.7 km	MPC · JPL
488995	2005 UZ_{434}	—	October 29, 2005	Mount Lemmon	Mount Lemmon Survey	·	1.6 km	MPC · JPL
488996	2005 UB_{450}	—	October 31, 2005	Mount Lemmon	Mount Lemmon Survey	·	960 m	MPC · JPL
488997	2005 UL_{460}	—	October 28, 2005	Mount Lemmon	Mount Lemmon Survey	·	1.6 km	MPC · JPL
488998	2005 UR_{468}	—	October 30, 2005	Kitt Peak	Spacewatch	·	2.5 km	MPC · JPL
488999	2005 UT_{524}	—	October 27, 2005	Kitt Peak	Spacewatch	HOF	2.0 km	MPC · JPL
489000	2005 UX_{526}	—	October 28, 2005	Kitt Peak	Spacewatch	·	2.6 km	MPC · JPL

back to top
