= NEKAAL =

NEKAAL is the Northeast Kansas Amateur Astronomers' League, a non-profit educational and scientific organization founded 1978 and based in Topeka, Kansas. NEKAAL and its members specialize in educational outreach to surrounding counties, and in discovering and refining orbits of solar system objects including comets and asteroids.

NEKAAL is a member of the International Dark-Sky Association and the Night Sky Network, and operates the Farpoint Observatory southwest of Topeka.
