= Farpoint Observatory =

Observatory in Kansas, US

- Organization: NEKAAL
- Observatory code: 734
- Location: Eskridge, Kansas, U.S.
- Coordinates: 38°53′24″N 96°00′25″W
- Established: 1996
- Website: NEKAAL.org

Telescopes
- Clyde Tombaugh Telescope: 27 inches (69 cm) reflector

Minor planets discovered: 131
see § List of discovered minor planets

Farpoint Observatory is an astronomical observatory owned and operated by the Northeast Kansas Amateur Astronomers' League, or NEKAAL. It is located on the grounds of Mission Valley High School at Eskridge, near Auburn, Kansas, approximately 30 miles (48 km) southwest of Topeka, Kansas, United States.

== Summary ==
Farpoint Observatory is International Astronomical Union (IAU) observatory code 734, and is home to the Farpoint Asteroid Search Team (FAST), which has an international reputation having discovered more than 330 non-NEO (Near Earth Orbit) asteroids in addition to many in NEO orbits. As of January 1, 2014, Farpoint observers had contributed more than minor planet observations to the IAU Minor Planet Center.

NEKAAL received a $56,060 grant from NASA's Near Earth Objects (NEO) tracking program to acquire and install at Farpoint the Pitt telescope from Lindley Hall, University of Kansas. After full refurbishment, the telescope now measures 27 inches in aperture (primary mirror diameter), 9 feet 3 inches in length, with weight of 1,600 pounds (725 kg).

The main-belt asteroid 23989 Farpoint, discovered by amateur astronomers Gary Hug and Graham E. Bell at Farpoint in 1999, was named for the observatory.

== List of discovered minor planets ==
| (26623) 2000 GK_{82} | 8 April 2000 | list^{[A]} |
| (27427) 2000 FE_{1} | 31 March 2000 | list^{[A]} |
| (27429) 2000 FL_{8} | 28 March 2000 | list^{[A]} |
| (28463) 2000 AG_{168} | 7 January 2000 | list^{[A]} |
| (28491) 2000 CC_{59} | 5 February 2000 | list^{[A]} |
| (32304) 2000 QC_{25} | 25 August 2000 | list^{[A]} |
| (33948) 2000 MA_{2} | 25 June 2000 | list^{[A]} |
| (33995) 2000 OV_{1} | 26 July 2000 | list^{[A]} |
| (42095) 2001 AY_{25} | 6 January 2001 | list^{[A]} |
| (42096) 2001 AZ_{25} | 6 January 2001 | list^{[A]} |
| (44893) 1999 VV_{8} | 5 November 1999 | list^{[A]} |
| (53814) 2000 EH_{137} | 12 March 2000 | list^{[A]} |
| (54111) 2000 HP_{11} | 30 April 2000 | list^{[A]} |
| (54438) 2000 MB_{2} | 25 June 2000 | list^{[A]} |
| (54666) 2000 WJ_{6} | 20 November 2000 | list^{[A]} |
| (55407) 2001 TQ_{1} | 11 October 2001 | list^{[A]} |
| (61194) 2000 OU_{1} | 24 July 2000 | list^{[A]} |
| (67377) 2000 OW_{1} | 26 July 2000 | list^{[A]} |
| (70678) 1999 UB_{2} | 18 October 1999 | list^{[A]} |
| (71890) 2000 WK_{6} | 20 November 2000 | list^{[A]} |
| (72837) 2001 HQ_{24} | 24 April 2001 | list^{[A]} |
| (76384) 2000 FE | 24 March 2000 | list^{[A]} |
| (76849) 2000 WL_{6} | 20 November 2000 | list^{[A]} |
| (81914) 2000 NJ_{11} | 12 July 2000 | list^{[A]} |
| (82738) 2001 QA | 16 August 2001 | list^{[A]} |

| (87123) 2000 MO_{1} | 25 June 2000 | list^{[A]} |
| (88471) 2001 QL_{111} | 26 August 2001 | list^{[A]} |
| (88905) 2001 TN_{1} | 11 October 2001 | list^{[A]} |
| (95472) 2002 EG_{1} | 5 March 2002 | list^{[A]} |
| (101905) 1999 RN_{1} | 4 September 1999 | list^{[A]} |
| (103461) 2000 AX_{205} | 14 January 2000 | list^{[A]} |
| (104897) 2000 JP_{5} | 5 May 2000 | list^{[A]} |
| (109267) 2001 QM_{111} | 26 August 2001 | list^{[A]} |
| (110384) 2001 TM_{1} | 11 October 2001 | list^{[A]} |
| (113672) 2002 TN_{96} | 10 October 2002 | list^{[A]} |
| (115192) 2003 SO_{106} | 20 September 2003 | list^{[A]} |
| (118682) 2000 NJ_{3} | 7 July 2000 | list^{[A]} |
| (131191) 2001 DC_{7} | 17 February 2001 | list^{[A]} |
| (134753) 2000 CY_{1} | 3 February 2000 | list^{[A]} |
| (134986) 2001 FE_{100} | 17 March 2001 | list^{[A]} |
| (137499) 1999 VS_{11} | 5 November 1999 | list^{[A]} |
| (143075) 2002 WP_{20} | 29 November 2002 | list^{[A]} |
| (148575) 2001 QA_{272} | 19 August 2001 | list^{[B]} |
| (152072) 2004 RF_{9} | 7 September 2004 | list^{[B]} |
| (152468) 2005 VN_{114} | 10 November 2005 | list^{[B]} |
| (154145) 2002 FX_{5} | 22 March 2002 | list^{[B]} |
| (154149) 2002 GS_{1} | 5 April 2002 | list^{[B]} |
| (161220) 2002 WH_{17} | 29 November 2002 | list^{[B]} |
| (164588) 2007 PP | 3 August 2007 | list^{[B]} |
| (168260) 2006 NT | 2 July 2006 | list^{[B]} |

| (171375) 2006 OH | 17 July 2006 | list^{[B]} |
| (179219) 2001 TB_{238} | 14 October 2001 | list^{[B]} |
| (179621) 2002 PY_{36} | 8 August 2002 | list^{[B]} |
| (185434) 2006 XK_{31} | 13 December 2006 | list^{[B]} |
| (185533) 2007 WG_{53} | 17 November 2007 | list^{[B]} |
| (185977) 2001 MU_{7} | 23 June 2001 | list^{[B]} |
| (187305) 2005 UO_{2} | 23 October 2005 | list^{[B]} |
| (187917) 2000 WH_{9} | 21 November 2000 | list^{[B]} |
| (188230) 2002 TO_{300} | 15 October 2002 | list^{[B]} |
| (188938) 2007 DO_{1} | 18 February 2007 | list^{[B]} |
| (188942) 2007 DD_{8} | 21 February 2007 | list^{[B]} |
| (189180) 2003 AH_{8} | 3 January 2003 | list^{[B]} |
| (189713) 2001 TD_{198} | 11 October 2001 | list^{[B]} |
| (193717) 2001 FP_{102} | 17 March 2001 | list^{[B]} |
| (193849) 2001 QK_{111} | 26 August 2001 | list^{[B]} |
| (195381) 2002 GL_{1} | 2 April 2002 | list^{[B]} |
| (200006) 2007 LG | 6 June 2007 | list^{[B]} |
| (200026) 2007 PD_{2} | 7 August 2007 | list^{[B]} |
| (200334) 2000 HO_{11} | 30 April 2000 | list^{[B]} |
| (202748) 2007 OV_{3} | 18 July 2007 | list^{[B]} |
| (203472) 2002 AH_{17} | 12 January 2002 | list^{[B]} |
| (207562) 2006 OW_{15} | 30 July 2006 | list^{[B]} |
| (207595) 2006 QL_{79} | 24 August 2006 | list^{[B]} |
| (207660) 2007 PA_{2} | 7 August 2007 | list^{[B]} |
| (207877) 2007 VN_{300} | 14 November 2007 | list^{[B]} |

| (213530) 2002 JE_{1} | 4 May 2002 | list^{[B]} |
| (216287) 2007 AE | 7 January 2007 | list^{[B]} |
| (219479) 2001 DB_{7} | 17 February 2001 | list^{[B]} |
| (222710) 2002 AN_{91} | 15 January 2002 | list^{[B]} |
| (227141) 2005 PJ | 1 August 2005 | list^{[B]} |
| (230345) 2002 CO_{252} | 4 February 2002 | list^{[B]} |
| (238881) 2005 YM_{40} | 27 December 2005 | list^{[B]} |
| (240132) 2002 JD | 3 May 2002 | list^{[B]} |
| (240217) 2002 SX_{44} | 29 September 2002 | list^{[B]} |
| (242919) 2006 OA_{7} | 24 July 2006 | list^{[B]} |
| (243662) 1999 VW_{71} | 15 November 1999 | list^{[B]} |
| (243735) 2000 OT_{1} | 23 July 2000 | list^{[B]} |
| (244298) 2002 FY_{5} | 22 March 2002 | list^{[B]} |
| (252389) 2001 TT | 6 October 2001 | list^{[B]} |
| (254745) 2005 OT_{22} | 28 July 2005 | list^{[B]} |
| (256390) 2006 YS_{44} | 26 December 2006 | list^{[B]} |
| (258630) 2002 EE_{1} | 5 March 2002 | list^{[B]} |
| (270832) 2002 SF_{44} | 29 September 2002 | list^{[B]} |
| (272646) 2005 WC_{117} | 30 November 2005 | list^{[B]} |
| (282190) 2001 TG_{198} | 11 October 2001 | list^{[B]} |
| (282791) 2006 NA | 1 July 2006 | list^{[B]} |
| (284327) 2006 RY_{1} | 13 September 2006 | list^{[B]} |
| (290920) 2005 WQ_{118} | 30 November 2005 | list^{[B]} |
| (292050) 2006 RX_{1} | 13 September 2006 | list^{[B]} |
| (292183) 2006 SM_{20} | 19 September 2006 | list^{[B]} |

| (292277) 2006 SS_{121} | 19 September 2006 | list^{[B]} |
| (292286) 2006 SG_{131} | 25 September 2006 | list^{[B]} |
| (297354) 2000 AB_{147} | 7 January 2000 | list^{[B]} |
| (299948) 2006 TT_{56} | 14 October 2006 | list^{[B]} |
| (309145) 2006 YR_{6} | 19 December 2006 | list^{[B]} |
| (309147) 2006 YD_{13} | 23 December 2006 | list^{[B]} |
| (332215) 2006 GN_{3} | 1 April 2006 | list^{[B]} |
| (344115) 1999 VV_{71} | 15 November 1999 | list^{[B]} |
| (344179) 2001 DX_{7} | 18 February 2001 | list^{[B]} |
| (345220) 2005 UV_{158} | 29 October 2005 | list^{[B]} |
| (345537) 2006 QK_{79} | 24 August 2006 | list^{[B]} |
| (348720) 2006 DY_{50} | 23 February 2006 | list^{[B]} |
| (351847) 2006 RZ_{2} | 14 September 2006 | list^{[B]} |
| (354029) 2001 RK_{16} | 10 September 2001 | list^{[B]} |
| (355021) 2006 QM_{137} | 31 August 2006 | list^{[B]} |
| (367124) 2006 SE_{131} | 25 September 2006 | list^{[B]} |
| (368275) 2002 EN_{2} | 5 March 2002 | list^{[B]} |
| (374922) 2006 YY_{1} | 19 December 2006 | list^{[B]} |
| (383395) 2006 TB_{59} | 13 October 2006 | list^{[B]} |
| (400016) 2006 MG_{13} | 25 June 2006 | list^{[B]} |
| (410025) 2006 XO_{3} | 12 December 2006 | list^{[B]} |
| (417474) 2006 RR_{22} | 15 September 2006 | list^{[B]} |
| (423831) 2006 OY_{2} | 17 July 2006 | list^{[B]} |
| (424031) 2006 YU_{13} | 23 December 2006 | list^{[B]} |
| (440241) 2004 RG_{9} | 7 September 2004 | list^{[B]} |

| (455385) 2002 VB_{85} | 9 November 2002 | list^{[B]} |
| (456339) 2006 TO_{1} | 1 October 2006 | list^{[B]} |
| (461950) 2006 TP_{9} | 13 October 2006 | list^{[B]} |
| (467491) 2006 UW_{63} | 23 October 2006 | list^{[B]} |
| (470214) 2006 WF_{29} | 22 November 2006 | list^{[B]} |
| (474642) 2004 XN_{3} | 3 December 2004 | list^{[B]} |
Discoveries are credited by the MPC to:^{A} "Farpoint"^{B} "Eskridge"

== See also ==
- Dan Tibbets
- List of asteroid-discovering observatories
- List of astronomical observatories
- List of minor planet discoverers § Discovering dedicated institutions
- List of observatory codes
