= Kurt Schreckling =

German technician (born 1939)

Kurt Schreckling (born 1939) is a German technician, who pioneered home-constructed turbojet engines for model aircraft. He is also an amateur astronomer specialized in optical measurements. The asteroid 489603 Kurtschreckling was named in his honor.

== Career ==
His design was constructed using hand tools, and has a wooden compressor and a bent metal gas turbine. It was fitted into a radio-controlled aircraft that flew successfully. He won various prizes and wrote books about this field of research. Jet engines following his design are designated with a K, and J for Jesus Artes (his co-developer), for example KJ66

Years later and being retired he became an innovative well known developer for high end amateur astronomy components in the field of amateur telescope making (ATM). Having worked in his professional career as a physicist and measurement engineer in a German DAX-Company Kurt Schreckling introduced advanced opportunities and unorthodox ways to optimize and measure telescopes for ambitious amateurs on a high quality level regarding surface quality, light weight construction while permanently compensating different optical aberrations. His ideas for improving telescopes and their optical perfection have become legendary in the German-speaking countries in the amateur telescope maker scene. Kurt Schreckling is active in various amateur astronomer forums in the internet.

== Awards and honors ==
Asteroid 489603 Kurtschreckling, discovered by Richard Gierlinger at the Gaisberg Observatory (B21) in 2007, was named after him. The official naming citation was published by the Minor Planet Center on 11 July 2018 (M.P.C. 110639–110640).

== Publications ==
- Schreckling, Kurt (1994). Gas Turbine Engines for Model Aircraft. Traplet Publications. ISBN 0-9510589-1-6.
- — (2000). The Model Turbo-Prop Engine for Home Construction. Traplet Publications. ISBN 190037126X.
- — (2005). Home Built Model Turbines. Traplet. ISBN 1900371375.
