= List of minor planets: 489001–490000 =

The following is a partial list of minor planets, running from minor-planet number 489001 through 490000, inclusive. The primary data for this and other partial lists is based on JPL's "Small-Body Orbital Elements" and data available from the Minor Planet Center. Critical list information is also provided by the MPC, unless otherwise specified from Lowell Observatory. A detailed description of the table's columns and additional sources are given on the main page including a complete list of every page in this series, and a statistical break-up on the dynamical classification of minor planets.

Also see the summary list of all named bodies in numerical and alphabetical order, and the corresponding naming citations for the number range of this particular list. New namings may only be added to this list after official publication, as the preannouncement of names is condemned by the Working Group for Small Bodies Nomenclature of the International Astronomical Union.

Near-Earth obj.	MBA (inner)	MBA (outer)	Centaur
Mars-crosser	MBA (middle)	Jupiter trojan	Trans-Neptunian obj.
Unclassified

== 489001–489100 ==
Designation			Discovery			Properties		Ref
Permanent	Provisional	Named after	Date	Site	Discoverer(s)	Category	Diam.	Ref
489001	2005 UU_{530}	—	October 23, 2005	Catalina	CSS	·	2.6 km	MPC · JPL
489002	2005 VB	—	October 1, 2005	Mount Lemmon	Mount Lemmon Survey	critical	840 m	MPC · JPL
489003	2005 VW_{1}	—	October 29, 2005	Catalina	CSS	H	550 m	MPC · JPL
489004	2005 VD_{11}	—	November 3, 2005	Kitt Peak	Spacewatch	·	1.6 km	MPC · JPL
489005	2005 VN_{24}	—	October 24, 2005	Kitt Peak	Spacewatch	AST	1.4 km	MPC · JPL
489006	2005 VP_{27}	—	November 3, 2005	Mount Lemmon	Mount Lemmon Survey	·	2.0 km	MPC · JPL
489007	2005 VG_{31}	—	November 4, 2005	Kitt Peak	Spacewatch	·	980 m	MPC · JPL
489008	2005 VJ_{61}	—	October 27, 2005	Catalina	CSS	H	450 m	MPC · JPL
489009	2005 VO_{81}	—	November 5, 2005	Kitt Peak	Spacewatch	·	630 m	MPC · JPL
489010	2005 VH_{92}	—	October 29, 2005	Mount Lemmon	Mount Lemmon Survey	KOR	1.1 km	MPC · JPL
489011	2005 VR_{94}	—	November 6, 2005	Kitt Peak	Spacewatch	BRA	1.6 km	MPC · JPL
489012	2005 VN_{101}	—	October 25, 2005	Kitt Peak	Spacewatch	·	1.7 km	MPC · JPL
489013	2005 VD_{114}	—	November 10, 2005	Mount Lemmon	Mount Lemmon Survey	·	780 m	MPC · JPL
489014	2005 VS_{127}	—	September 25, 2005	Kitt Peak	Spacewatch	MAS	590 m	MPC · JPL
489015	2005 WY_{8}	—	November 21, 2005	Kitt Peak	Spacewatch	·	1.6 km	MPC · JPL
489016	2005 WZ_{16}	—	November 10, 2005	Mount Lemmon	Mount Lemmon Survey	·	2.1 km	MPC · JPL
489017	2005 WA_{18}	—	November 22, 2005	Kitt Peak	Spacewatch	·	690 m	MPC · JPL
489018	2005 WV_{18}	—	November 22, 2005	Kitt Peak	Spacewatch	·	1.0 km	MPC · JPL
489019	2005 WR_{23}	—	October 28, 2005	Mount Lemmon	Mount Lemmon Survey	·	850 m	MPC · JPL
489020	2005 WX_{26}	—	November 21, 2005	Kitt Peak	Spacewatch	·	860 m	MPC · JPL
489021	2005 WZ_{27}	—	October 27, 2005	Mount Lemmon	Mount Lemmon Survey	·	1.8 km	MPC · JPL
489022	2005 WY_{44}	—	November 3, 2005	Kitt Peak	Spacewatch	KOR	1.2 km	MPC · JPL
489023	2005 WO_{45}	—	November 22, 2005	Kitt Peak	Spacewatch	·	770 m	MPC · JPL
489024	2005 WP_{66}	—	November 22, 2005	Kitt Peak	Spacewatch	H	350 m	MPC · JPL
489025	2005 WP_{67}	—	October 25, 2005	Mount Lemmon	Mount Lemmon Survey	KOR	1.2 km	MPC · JPL
489026	2005 WP_{68}	—	October 27, 2005	Mount Lemmon	Mount Lemmon Survey	·	1.8 km	MPC · JPL
489027	2005 WF_{80}	—	November 25, 2005	Mount Lemmon	Mount Lemmon Survey	H	480 m	MPC · JPL
489028	2005 WP_{85}	—	October 5, 2005	Kitt Peak	Spacewatch	·	590 m	MPC · JPL
489029	2005 WE_{109}	—	November 30, 2005	Kitt Peak	Spacewatch	·	460 m	MPC · JPL
489030	2005 WV_{134}	—	October 30, 2005	Mount Lemmon	Mount Lemmon Survey	·	860 m	MPC · JPL
489031	2005 WF_{135}	—	November 25, 2005	Mount Lemmon	Mount Lemmon Survey	·	910 m	MPC · JPL
489032	2005 WA_{145}	—	November 25, 2005	Kitt Peak	Spacewatch	·	750 m	MPC · JPL
489033	2005 WK_{157}	—	November 25, 2005	Mount Lemmon	Mount Lemmon Survey	·	1.0 km	MPC · JPL
489034	2005 WK_{165}	—	November 29, 2005	Mount Lemmon	Mount Lemmon Survey	·	1.0 km	MPC · JPL
489035	2005 WG_{166}	—	November 29, 2005	Mount Lemmon	Mount Lemmon Survey	·	630 m	MPC · JPL
489036	2005 WM_{181}	—	November 25, 2005	Catalina	CSS	·	1.0 km	MPC · JPL
489037	2005 XY_{32}	—	December 4, 2005	Kitt Peak	Spacewatch	·	760 m	MPC · JPL
489038	2005 XU_{59}	—	December 3, 2005	Kitt Peak	Spacewatch	·	1.0 km	MPC · JPL
489039	2005 XU_{66}	—	December 4, 2005	Kitt Peak	Spacewatch	·	820 m	MPC · JPL
489040	2005 XN_{86}	—	December 8, 2005	Kitt Peak	Spacewatch	·	2.0 km	MPC · JPL
489041	2005 XT_{86}	—	December 8, 2005	Kitt Peak	Spacewatch	·	650 m	MPC · JPL
489042	2005 XV_{87}	—	December 5, 2005	Kitt Peak	Spacewatch	·	610 m	MPC · JPL
489043	2005 YM_{11}	—	November 30, 2005	Kitt Peak	Spacewatch	MAS	580 m	MPC · JPL
489044	2005 YW_{17}	—	December 23, 2005	Kitt Peak	Spacewatch	·	1.4 km	MPC · JPL
489045	2005 YH_{40}	—	December 22, 2005	Kitt Peak	Spacewatch	NYS	770 m	MPC · JPL
489046	2005 YF_{58}	—	December 24, 2005	Kitt Peak	Spacewatch	EOS	1.7 km	MPC · JPL
489047	2005 YJ_{64}	—	December 24, 2005	Kitt Peak	Spacewatch	·	1.3 km	MPC · JPL
489048	2005 YP_{66}	—	December 25, 2005	Kitt Peak	Spacewatch	·	1.1 km	MPC · JPL
489049	2005 YN_{67}	—	November 25, 2005	Mount Lemmon	Mount Lemmon Survey	V	510 m	MPC · JPL
489050	2005 YE_{68}	—	December 26, 2005	Kitt Peak	Spacewatch	·	940 m	MPC · JPL
489051	2005 YH_{69}	—	December 1, 2005	Mount Lemmon	Mount Lemmon Survey	H	530 m	MPC · JPL
489052	2005 YL_{81}	—	December 2, 2005	Mount Lemmon	Mount Lemmon Survey	MRX	970 m	MPC · JPL
489053	2005 YK_{93}	—	December 27, 2005	Catalina	CSS	·	980 m	MPC · JPL
489054	2005 YA_{96}	—	December 25, 2005	Kitt Peak	Spacewatch	·	1.7 km	MPC · JPL
489055	2005 YT_{117}	—	December 25, 2005	Kitt Peak	Spacewatch	·	1.0 km	MPC · JPL
489056	2005 YV_{122}	—	December 24, 2005	Socorro	LINEAR	H	600 m	MPC · JPL
489057	2005 YS_{128}	—	December 27, 2005	Kitt Peak	Spacewatch	H	600 m	MPC · JPL
489058	2005 YU_{165}	—	December 26, 2005	Kitt Peak	Spacewatch	·	870 m	MPC · JPL
489059	2005 YP_{170}	—	December 29, 2005	Kitt Peak	Spacewatch	H	520 m	MPC · JPL
489060	2005 YP_{187}	—	December 28, 2005	Mount Lemmon	Mount Lemmon Survey	·	930 m	MPC · JPL
489061	2005 YB_{190}	—	December 30, 2005	Kitt Peak	Spacewatch	·	1.8 km	MPC · JPL
489062	2005 YC_{199}	—	December 25, 2005	Mount Lemmon	Mount Lemmon Survey	NYS	920 m	MPC · JPL
489063	2005 YQ_{207}	—	December 29, 2005	Kitt Peak	Spacewatch	V	540 m	MPC · JPL
489064	2005 YB_{217}	—	August 22, 2004	Kitt Peak	Spacewatch	·	1.6 km	MPC · JPL
489065	2005 YO_{234}	—	December 28, 2005	Kitt Peak	Spacewatch	·	1.6 km	MPC · JPL
489066	2005 YB_{251}	—	December 28, 2005	Kitt Peak	Spacewatch	·	1.0 km	MPC · JPL
489067	2005 YH_{264}	—	December 25, 2005	Kitt Peak	Spacewatch	KOR	990 m	MPC · JPL
489068	2005 YC_{289}	—	December 30, 2005	Mount Lemmon	Mount Lemmon Survey	·	680 m	MPC · JPL
489069	2006 AF	—	January 2, 2006	Mount Lemmon	Mount Lemmon Survey	·	700 m	MPC · JPL
489070	2006 AJ_{2}	—	January 2, 2006	Mount Lemmon	Mount Lemmon Survey	H	510 m	MPC · JPL
489071	2006 AX_{5}	—	January 2, 2006	Socorro	LINEAR	PHO	900 m	MPC · JPL
489072	2006 AK_{17}	—	December 28, 2005	Kitt Peak	Spacewatch	CYB	3.2 km	MPC · JPL
489073	2006 AS_{18}	—	December 22, 2005	Kitt Peak	Spacewatch	·	700 m	MPC · JPL
489074	2006 AP_{19}	—	December 29, 2005	Socorro	LINEAR	·	830 m	MPC · JPL
489075	2006 AV_{28}	—	December 5, 2005	Mount Lemmon	Mount Lemmon Survey	·	740 m	MPC · JPL
489076	2006 AR_{38}	—	January 7, 2006	Kitt Peak	Spacewatch	NYS	900 m	MPC · JPL
489077	2006 AW_{38}	—	January 7, 2006	Mount Lemmon	Mount Lemmon Survey	·	2.3 km	MPC · JPL
489078	2006 AN_{50}	—	January 5, 2006	Kitt Peak	Spacewatch	·	690 m	MPC · JPL
489079	2006 AA_{53}	—	January 5, 2006	Kitt Peak	Spacewatch	EOS	1.8 km	MPC · JPL
489080	2006 AF_{53}	—	December 28, 2005	Kitt Peak	Spacewatch	·	1.7 km	MPC · JPL
489081	2006 AK_{66}	—	January 9, 2006	Kitt Peak	Spacewatch	·	800 m	MPC · JPL
489082	2006 AY_{76}	—	January 5, 2006	Kitt Peak	Spacewatch	INA	2.9 km	MPC · JPL
489083	2006 AZ_{93}	—	January 7, 2006	Mount Lemmon	Mount Lemmon Survey	L5	10 km	MPC · JPL
489084	2006 AF_{101}	—	January 7, 2006	Mount Lemmon	Mount Lemmon Survey	·	780 m	MPC · JPL
489085	2006 AU_{104}	—	January 7, 2006	Mount Lemmon	Mount Lemmon Survey	·	1.3 km	MPC · JPL
489086	2006 BU_{12}	—	January 5, 2006	Mount Lemmon	Mount Lemmon Survey	·	850 m	MPC · JPL
489087	2006 BQ_{21}	—	December 5, 2005	Mount Lemmon	Mount Lemmon Survey	(2076)	1.2 km	MPC · JPL
489088	2006 BL_{51}	—	January 25, 2006	Kitt Peak	Spacewatch	·	1.5 km	MPC · JPL
489089	2006 BN_{51}	—	January 25, 2006	Kitt Peak	Spacewatch	·	1.6 km	MPC · JPL
489090	2006 BU_{57}	—	January 23, 2006	Kitt Peak	Spacewatch	·	1.3 km	MPC · JPL
489091	2006 BL_{61}	—	January 22, 2006	Catalina	CSS	·	1.1 km	MPC · JPL
489092	2006 BE_{67}	—	January 23, 2006	Kitt Peak	Spacewatch	·	980 m	MPC · JPL
489093	2006 BP_{69}	—	January 23, 2006	Kitt Peak	Spacewatch	·	700 m	MPC · JPL
489094	2006 BC_{78}	—	January 10, 2006	Mount Lemmon	Mount Lemmon Survey	·	2.2 km	MPC · JPL
489095	2006 BX_{85}	—	January 25, 2006	Kitt Peak	Spacewatch	·	1.0 km	MPC · JPL
489096	2006 BX_{86}	—	January 25, 2006	Kitt Peak	Spacewatch	·	2.3 km	MPC · JPL
489097	2006 BN_{94}	—	January 26, 2006	Kitt Peak	Spacewatch	NYS	790 m	MPC · JPL
489098	2006 BV_{109}	—	January 25, 2006	Kitt Peak	Spacewatch	·	1.4 km	MPC · JPL
489099	2006 BL_{182}	—	January 27, 2006	Mount Lemmon	Mount Lemmon Survey	MAS	500 m	MPC · JPL
489100	2006 BF_{186}	—	January 28, 2006	Mount Lemmon	Mount Lemmon Survey	3:2	4.7 km	MPC · JPL

== 489101–489200 ==
back to top

Designation			Discovery			Properties		Ref
Permanent	Provisional	Named after	Date	Site	Discoverer(s)	Category	Diam.	Ref
489101	2006 BJ_{188}	—	January 28, 2006	Kitt Peak	Spacewatch	L5	9.9 km	MPC · JPL
489102	2006 BB_{202}	—	January 31, 2006	Kitt Peak	Spacewatch	EOS	1.4 km	MPC · JPL
489103	2006 BO_{210}	—	January 31, 2006	Mount Lemmon	Mount Lemmon Survey	·	1.9 km	MPC · JPL
489104	2006 BQ_{213}	—	January 22, 2006	Catalina	CSS	H	590 m	MPC · JPL
489105	2006 BS_{217}	—	January 28, 2006	Catalina	CSS	·	3.2 km	MPC · JPL
489106	2006 BG_{219}	—	January 28, 2006	Mount Lemmon	Mount Lemmon Survey	·	1.0 km	MPC · JPL
489107	2006 BS_{222}	—	January 5, 2006	Mount Lemmon	Mount Lemmon Survey	ERI	970 m	MPC · JPL
489108	2006 BD_{232}	—	January 31, 2006	Kitt Peak	Spacewatch	·	860 m	MPC · JPL
489109	2006 BL_{234}	—	January 31, 2006	Kitt Peak	Spacewatch	·	560 m	MPC · JPL
489110	2006 BY_{238}	—	January 31, 2006	Mount Lemmon	Mount Lemmon Survey	·	760 m	MPC · JPL
489111	2006 BX_{242}	—	January 25, 2006	Kitt Peak	Spacewatch	·	2.0 km	MPC · JPL
489112	2006 BM_{244}	—	January 31, 2006	Kitt Peak	Spacewatch	·	720 m	MPC · JPL
489113	2006 BE_{249}	—	January 31, 2006	Kitt Peak	Spacewatch	·	760 m	MPC · JPL
489114	2006 BF_{250}	—	January 26, 2006	Mount Lemmon	Mount Lemmon Survey	·	940 m	MPC · JPL
489115	2006 BZ_{268}	—	December 6, 2005	Mount Lemmon	Mount Lemmon Survey	·	2.1 km	MPC · JPL
489116	2006 BA_{281}	—	January 26, 2006	Kitt Peak	Spacewatch	·	650 m	MPC · JPL
489117	2006 CC_{2}	—	February 1, 2006	Kitt Peak	Spacewatch	·	1.1 km	MPC · JPL
489118	2006 CU_{9}	—	November 10, 2005	Kitt Peak	Spacewatch	H	590 m	MPC · JPL
489119	2006 CT_{25}	—	January 23, 2006	Mount Lemmon	Mount Lemmon Survey	·	2.7 km	MPC · JPL
489120	2006 CG_{37}	—	February 2, 2006	Mount Lemmon	Mount Lemmon Survey	·	3.1 km	MPC · JPL
489121	2006 CM_{42}	—	February 2, 2006	Kitt Peak	Spacewatch	·	2.2 km	MPC · JPL
489122	2006 CS_{46}	—	February 3, 2006	Kitt Peak	Spacewatch	·	1.2 km	MPC · JPL
489123	2006 CX_{46}	—	December 6, 2005	Mount Lemmon	Mount Lemmon Survey	·	750 m	MPC · JPL
489124	2006 CS_{67}	—	February 7, 2006	Kitt Peak	Spacewatch	·	910 m	MPC · JPL
489125	2006 DZ_{19}	—	January 31, 2006	Kitt Peak	Spacewatch	·	680 m	MPC · JPL
489126	2006 DY_{24}	—	February 20, 2006	Kitt Peak	Spacewatch	THM	2.0 km	MPC · JPL
489127	2006 DN_{27}	—	February 20, 2006	Kitt Peak	Spacewatch	·	960 m	MPC · JPL
489128	2006 DT_{33}	—	February 20, 2006	Kitt Peak	Spacewatch	·	2.1 km	MPC · JPL
489129	2006 DX_{38}	—	February 21, 2006	Mount Lemmon	Mount Lemmon Survey	NYS	700 m	MPC · JPL
489130	2006 DF_{85}	—	February 24, 2006	Kitt Peak	Spacewatch	·	480 m	MPC · JPL
489131	2006 DQ_{94}	—	February 2, 2006	Mount Lemmon	Mount Lemmon Survey	·	3.3 km	MPC · JPL
489132	2006 DH_{96}	—	February 24, 2006	Kitt Peak	Spacewatch	·	2.7 km	MPC · JPL
489133	2006 DV_{101}	—	February 1, 2006	Mount Lemmon	Mount Lemmon Survey	NYS	860 m	MPC · JPL
489134	2006 DG_{103}	—	January 26, 2006	Mount Lemmon	Mount Lemmon Survey	EOS	1.6 km	MPC · JPL
489135	2006 DA_{107}	—	February 25, 2006	Mount Lemmon	Mount Lemmon Survey	·	1.9 km	MPC · JPL
489136	2006 DM_{108}	—	September 30, 2003	Kitt Peak	Spacewatch	·	2.3 km	MPC · JPL
489137	2006 DC_{115}	—	February 27, 2006	Kitt Peak	Spacewatch	MAS	660 m	MPC · JPL
489138	2006 DO_{123}	—	January 30, 2006	Kitt Peak	Spacewatch	·	810 m	MPC · JPL
489139	2006 DH_{135}	—	February 25, 2006	Mount Lemmon	Mount Lemmon Survey	MAS	640 m	MPC · JPL
489140	2006 DV_{139}	—	February 25, 2006	Kitt Peak	Spacewatch	·	910 m	MPC · JPL
489141	2006 DL_{142}	—	February 25, 2006	Kitt Peak	Spacewatch	·	2.3 km	MPC · JPL
489142	2006 DB_{146}	—	February 25, 2006	Mount Lemmon	Mount Lemmon Survey	·	850 m	MPC · JPL
489143	2006 DL_{152}	—	February 25, 2006	Mount Lemmon	Mount Lemmon Survey	·	880 m	MPC · JPL
489144	2006 DG_{155}	—	February 25, 2006	Kitt Peak	Spacewatch	·	1.1 km	MPC · JPL
489145	2006 DM_{157}	—	February 27, 2006	Kitt Peak	Spacewatch	NYS	820 m	MPC · JPL
489146	2006 DJ_{165}	—	February 27, 2006	Kitt Peak	Spacewatch	·	1.5 km	MPC · JPL
489147	2006 DJ_{172}	—	February 27, 2006	Kitt Peak	Spacewatch	·	2.0 km	MPC · JPL
489148	2006 DN_{172}	—	January 7, 2006	Mount Lemmon	Mount Lemmon Survey	LIX	2.6 km	MPC · JPL
489149	2006 DZ_{173}	—	February 27, 2006	Kitt Peak	Spacewatch	·	1.4 km	MPC · JPL
489150	2006 DU_{177}	—	February 27, 2006	Mount Lemmon	Mount Lemmon Survey	·	2.5 km	MPC · JPL
489151	2006 DR_{193}	—	February 28, 2006	Mount Lemmon	Mount Lemmon Survey	·	2.5 km	MPC · JPL
489152	2006 DC_{217}	—	February 27, 2006	Kitt Peak	Spacewatch	·	920 m	MPC · JPL
489153	2006 EF_{10}	—	March 2, 2006	Kitt Peak	Spacewatch	·	1.8 km	MPC · JPL
489154	2006 EN_{11}	—	March 2, 2006	Kitt Peak	Spacewatch	·	2.6 km	MPC · JPL
489155	2006 EL_{16}	—	March 2, 2006	Kitt Peak	Spacewatch	·	2.5 km	MPC · JPL
489156	2006 ES_{23}	—	March 3, 2006	Kitt Peak	Spacewatch	MAS	530 m	MPC · JPL
489157	2006 EW_{24}	—	March 3, 2006	Kitt Peak	Spacewatch	·	910 m	MPC · JPL
489158	2006 EC_{27}	—	February 25, 2006	Mount Lemmon	Mount Lemmon Survey	·	1.9 km	MPC · JPL
489159	2006 EE_{38}	—	March 4, 2006	Kitt Peak	Spacewatch	·	1.9 km	MPC · JPL
489160	2006 EK_{38}	—	March 4, 2006	Kitt Peak	Spacewatch	THM	1.8 km	MPC · JPL
489161	2006 EY_{46}	—	March 4, 2006	Kitt Peak	Spacewatch	·	820 m	MPC · JPL
489162	2006 ET_{53}	—	March 3, 2006	Mount Lemmon	Mount Lemmon Survey	·	2.6 km	MPC · JPL
489163	2006 ET_{67}	—	February 1, 2006	Kitt Peak	Spacewatch	·	1.8 km	MPC · JPL
489164	2006 FW_{2}	—	March 23, 2006	Kitt Peak	Spacewatch	H	600 m	MPC · JPL
489165	2006 FA_{9}	—	March 23, 2006	Kitt Peak	Spacewatch	·	1.0 km	MPC · JPL
489166	2006 FS_{20}	—	March 24, 2006	Bergisch Gladbach	W. Bickel	T_{j} (2.99)	3.6 km	MPC · JPL
489167	2006 FL_{22}	—	March 2, 2006	Kitt Peak	Spacewatch	·	1.8 km	MPC · JPL
489168	2006 FU_{28}	—	March 24, 2006	Mount Lemmon	Mount Lemmon Survey	·	3.0 km	MPC · JPL
489169	2006 FF_{30}	—	March 24, 2006	Mount Lemmon	Mount Lemmon Survey	·	3.0 km	MPC · JPL
489170	2006 FQ_{37}	—	March 25, 2006	Catalina	CSS	·	5.0 km	MPC · JPL
489171	2006 FT_{40}	—	February 28, 2006	Mount Lemmon	Mount Lemmon Survey	·	950 m	MPC · JPL
489172	2006 FX_{40}	—	March 26, 2006	Mount Lemmon	Mount Lemmon Survey	THM	1.9 km	MPC · JPL
489173	2006 GA_{6}	—	April 2, 2006	Kitt Peak	Spacewatch	·	1.2 km	MPC · JPL
489174	2006 GP_{18}	—	March 25, 2006	Mount Lemmon	Mount Lemmon Survey	EOS	1.7 km	MPC · JPL
489175	2006 GC_{27}	—	March 25, 2006	Kitt Peak	Spacewatch	·	1.3 km	MPC · JPL
489176	2006 GG_{27}	—	March 25, 2006	Kitt Peak	Spacewatch	·	2.5 km	MPC · JPL
489177	2006 GB_{33}	—	April 7, 2006	Kitt Peak	Spacewatch	·	3.0 km	MPC · JPL
489178	2006 GB_{41}	—	March 24, 2006	Socorro	LINEAR	·	2.9 km	MPC · JPL
489179	2006 GY_{46}	—	March 24, 2006	Kitt Peak	Spacewatch	·	2.0 km	MPC · JPL
489180	2006 GG_{54}	—	April 9, 2006	Mount Lemmon	Mount Lemmon Survey	·	1.0 km	MPC · JPL
489181	2006 HB_{4}	—	February 25, 2006	Mount Lemmon	Mount Lemmon Survey	·	1.7 km	MPC · JPL
489182	2006 HG_{10}	—	April 19, 2006	Kitt Peak	Spacewatch	·	2.4 km	MPC · JPL
489183	2006 HA_{14}	—	April 19, 2006	Mount Lemmon	Mount Lemmon Survey	·	910 m	MPC · JPL
489184	2006 HT_{16}	—	October 24, 2003	Apache Point	SDSS	·	2.4 km	MPC · JPL
489185	2006 HO_{21}	—	April 20, 2006	Kitt Peak	Spacewatch	LIX	2.8 km	MPC · JPL
489186	2006 HZ_{21}	—	April 20, 2006	Kitt Peak	Spacewatch	·	1.1 km	MPC · JPL
489187	2006 HU_{23}	—	April 20, 2006	Kitt Peak	Spacewatch	THM	2.1 km	MPC · JPL
489188	2006 HZ_{27}	—	April 20, 2006	Kitt Peak	Spacewatch	·	3.1 km	MPC · JPL
489189	2006 HM_{46}	—	April 2, 2006	Kitt Peak	Spacewatch	·	940 m	MPC · JPL
489190	2006 HM_{63}	—	April 24, 2006	Kitt Peak	Spacewatch	·	1.5 km	MPC · JPL
489191	2006 HR_{72}	—	April 25, 2006	Kitt Peak	Spacewatch	HYG	2.3 km	MPC · JPL
489192	2006 HF_{74}	—	April 25, 2006	Kitt Peak	Spacewatch	NYS	850 m	MPC · JPL
489193	2006 HX_{74}	—	April 25, 2006	Kitt Peak	Spacewatch	·	2.6 km	MPC · JPL
489194	2006 HK_{75}	—	April 25, 2006	Kitt Peak	Spacewatch	·	2.4 km	MPC · JPL
489195	2006 HL_{75}	—	April 25, 2006	Kitt Peak	Spacewatch	LIX	3.4 km	MPC · JPL
489196	2006 HZ_{75}	—	April 25, 2006	Kitt Peak	Spacewatch	EOS	2.3 km	MPC · JPL
489197	2006 HC_{79}	—	April 26, 2006	Kitt Peak	Spacewatch	·	2.6 km	MPC · JPL
489198	2006 HF_{79}	—	April 26, 2006	Kitt Peak	Spacewatch	MAS	600 m	MPC · JPL
489199	2006 HS_{96}	—	April 30, 2006	Kitt Peak	Spacewatch	·	3.9 km	MPC · JPL
489200	2006 HS_{109}	—	April 30, 2006	Kitt Peak	Spacewatch	PHO	720 m	MPC · JPL

== 489201–489300 ==
back to top

Designation			Discovery			Properties		Ref
Permanent	Provisional	Named after	Date	Site	Discoverer(s)	Category	Diam.	Ref
489201	2006 HS_{116}	—	April 26, 2006	Kitt Peak	Spacewatch	·	2.8 km	MPC · JPL
489202	2006 HJ_{154}	—	April 30, 2006	Kitt Peak	Spacewatch	·	2.8 km	MPC · JPL
489203	2006 JT	—	May 3, 2006	Mount Lemmon	Mount Lemmon Survey	AMO +1km	1.5 km	MPC · JPL
489204	2006 JP_{11}	—	May 1, 2006	Kitt Peak	Spacewatch	·	2.6 km	MPC · JPL
489205	2006 JR_{15}	—	May 2, 2006	Mount Lemmon	Mount Lemmon Survey	·	2.7 km	MPC · JPL
489206	2006 JU_{19}	—	May 2, 2006	Kitt Peak	Spacewatch	·	2.6 km	MPC · JPL
489207	2006 JG_{27}	—	May 1, 2006	Kitt Peak	Spacewatch	·	2.8 km	MPC · JPL
489208	2006 JX_{42}	—	May 2, 2006	Mount Lemmon	Mount Lemmon Survey	·	1 km	MPC · JPL
489209	2006 JJ_{45}	—	April 8, 2006	Kitt Peak	Spacewatch	·	1.0 km	MPC · JPL
489210	2006 JC_{50}	—	May 2, 2006	Mount Lemmon	Mount Lemmon Survey	·	920 m	MPC · JPL
489211	2006 JH_{74}	—	May 1, 2006	Mauna Kea	P. A. Wiegert	·	730 m	MPC · JPL
489212	2006 JN_{74}	—	March 25, 2006	Kitt Peak	Spacewatch	THM	1.8 km	MPC · JPL
489213	2006 KX_{15}	—	May 20, 2006	Catalina	CSS	PHO	1.1 km	MPC · JPL
489214	2006 KA_{17}	—	May 1, 2006	Catalina	CSS	THB	2.9 km	MPC · JPL
489215	2006 KX_{17}	—	May 21, 2006	Kitt Peak	Spacewatch	·	3.4 km	MPC · JPL
489216	2006 KR_{20}	—	May 17, 2006	Palomar	NEAT	·	690 m	MPC · JPL
489217	2006 KG_{46}	—	May 21, 2006	Mount Lemmon	Mount Lemmon Survey	THB	2.1 km	MPC · JPL
489218	2006 KJ_{47}	—	May 6, 2006	Mount Lemmon	Mount Lemmon Survey	VER	2.3 km	MPC · JPL
489219	2006 KD_{50}	—	May 21, 2006	Kitt Peak	Spacewatch	·	1.0 km	MPC · JPL
489220	2006 KV_{51}	—	May 21, 2006	Kitt Peak	Spacewatch	·	860 m	MPC · JPL
489221	2006 KT_{58}	—	May 3, 2006	Kitt Peak	Spacewatch	·	2.5 km	MPC · JPL
489222	2006 KZ_{60}	—	May 22, 2006	Kitt Peak	Spacewatch	·	480 m	MPC · JPL
489223	2006 KF_{62}	—	May 9, 2006	Mount Lemmon	Mount Lemmon Survey	·	2.9 km	MPC · JPL
489224	2006 KO_{62}	—	May 22, 2006	Kitt Peak	Spacewatch	·	2.9 km	MPC · JPL
489225	2006 KG_{74}	—	May 9, 2006	Mount Lemmon	Mount Lemmon Survey	·	2.5 km	MPC · JPL
489226	2006 KE_{75}	—	May 20, 2006	Kitt Peak	Spacewatch	·	2.4 km	MPC · JPL
489227	2006 KN_{106}	—	May 31, 2006	Mount Lemmon	Mount Lemmon Survey	·	1.1 km	MPC · JPL
489228	2006 KS_{109}	—	May 6, 2006	Kitt Peak	Spacewatch	·	1.2 km	MPC · JPL
489229	2006 KB_{120}	—	May 31, 2006	Kitt Peak	Spacewatch	·	3.0 km	MPC · JPL
489230	2006 MT_{7}	—	June 18, 2006	Kitt Peak	Spacewatch	·	1.1 km	MPC · JPL
489231	2006 OC_{4}	—	July 21, 2006	Mount Lemmon	Mount Lemmon Survey	·	720 m	MPC · JPL
489232	2006 PX_{13}	—	August 14, 2006	Siding Spring	SSS	BRG	1.5 km	MPC · JPL
489233	2006 QP_{27}	—	August 20, 2006	Kitt Peak	Spacewatch	·	480 m	MPC · JPL
489234	2006 QY_{29}	—	August 19, 2006	Anderson Mesa	LONEOS	·	2.4 km	MPC · JPL
489235	2006 QA_{58}	—	August 28, 2006	Anderson Mesa	LONEOS	AMO	310 m	MPC · JPL
489236	2006 QQ_{89}	—	August 28, 2006	La Sagra	OAM	·	2.3 km	MPC · JPL
489237	2006 QN_{133}	—	August 24, 2006	Socorro	LINEAR	·	930 m	MPC · JPL
489238	2006 QA_{137}	—	July 18, 2006	Mount Lemmon	Mount Lemmon Survey	(194)	1.7 km	MPC · JPL
489239	2006 QX_{164}	—	August 29, 2006	Anderson Mesa	LONEOS	EUN	1.1 km	MPC · JPL
489240	2006 QR_{182}	—	August 18, 2006	Kitt Peak	Spacewatch	·	1.3 km	MPC · JPL
489241	2006 QO_{184}	—	August 19, 2006	Kitt Peak	Spacewatch	·	1.3 km	MPC · JPL
489242	2006 QA_{186}	—	August 28, 2006	Catalina	CSS	·	1.5 km	MPC · JPL
489243	2006 QQ_{187}	—	August 29, 2006	Catalina	CSS	·	2.5 km	MPC · JPL
489244	2006 RW_{1}	—	September 13, 2006	Eskridge	Farpoint	MAS	570 m	MPC · JPL
489245	2006 RR_{14}	—	September 14, 2006	Kitt Peak	Spacewatch	JUN	980 m	MPC · JPL
489246	2006 RY_{14}	—	September 14, 2006	Kitt Peak	Spacewatch	·	1.3 km	MPC · JPL
489247	2006 RF_{18}	—	September 14, 2006	Kitt Peak	Spacewatch	·	1.7 km	MPC · JPL
489248	2006 RP_{22}	—	August 19, 2006	Anderson Mesa	LONEOS	·	1.6 km	MPC · JPL
489249	2006 RZ_{43}	—	September 14, 2006	Kitt Peak	Spacewatch	·	1.6 km	MPC · JPL
489250	2006 RV_{53}	—	September 14, 2006	Kitt Peak	Spacewatch	·	2.2 km	MPC · JPL
489251	2006 RD_{62}	—	September 12, 2006	Catalina	CSS	·	480 m	MPC · JPL
489252	2006 RJ_{68}	—	August 28, 2006	Kitt Peak	Spacewatch	·	1.5 km	MPC · JPL
489253	2006 RZ_{74}	—	September 15, 2006	Kitt Peak	Spacewatch	·	1.2 km	MPC · JPL
489254	2006 RQ_{75}	—	September 15, 2006	Kitt Peak	Spacewatch	·	680 m	MPC · JPL
489255	2006 RA_{77}	—	September 15, 2006	Kitt Peak	Spacewatch	·	500 m	MPC · JPL
489256	2006 RB_{90}	—	September 15, 2006	Kitt Peak	Spacewatch	·	1.7 km	MPC · JPL
489257	2006 RQ_{91}	—	September 15, 2006	Kitt Peak	Spacewatch	·	2.7 km	MPC · JPL
489258	2006 RB_{93}	—	September 15, 2006	Kitt Peak	Spacewatch	·	1.4 km	MPC · JPL
489259	2006 RV_{94}	—	September 15, 2006	Kitt Peak	Spacewatch	·	3.4 km	MPC · JPL
489260	2006 RS_{101}	—	August 30, 2006	Anderson Mesa	LONEOS	·	900 m	MPC · JPL
489261	2006 RU_{107}	—	September 14, 2006	Mauna Kea	Masiero, J.	·	700 m	MPC · JPL
489262	2006 RN_{112}	—	September 14, 2006	Mauna Kea	Masiero, J.	MRX	780 m	MPC · JPL
489263	2006 RK_{120}	—	September 14, 2006	Palomar	NEAT	·	1.4 km	MPC · JPL
489264	2006 RD_{121}	—	September 14, 2006	Kitt Peak	Spacewatch	ADE	1.4 km	MPC · JPL
489265	2006 ST_{10}	—	September 16, 2006	Kitt Peak	Spacewatch	·	3.1 km	MPC · JPL
489266	2006 SL_{16}	—	September 17, 2006	Kitt Peak	Spacewatch	·	2.3 km	MPC · JPL
489267	2006 SG_{17}	—	September 17, 2006	Kitt Peak	Spacewatch	·	4.0 km	MPC · JPL
489268	2006 SB_{22}	—	September 17, 2006	Kitt Peak	Spacewatch	·	910 m	MPC · JPL
489269	2006 SO_{31}	—	September 17, 2006	Kitt Peak	Spacewatch	·	1.3 km	MPC · JPL
489270	2006 SS_{52}	—	September 19, 2006	Anderson Mesa	LONEOS	·	1.5 km	MPC · JPL
489271	2006 SQ_{58}	—	September 20, 2006	Kitt Peak	Spacewatch	·	2.0 km	MPC · JPL
489272	2006 SK_{64}	—	September 17, 2006	Catalina	CSS	·	2.2 km	MPC · JPL
489273	2006 SQ_{75}	—	September 19, 2006	Kitt Peak	Spacewatch	THM	1.8 km	MPC · JPL
489274	2006 SN_{93}	—	September 18, 2006	Kitt Peak	Spacewatch	·	2.2 km	MPC · JPL
489275	2006 SZ_{99}	—	September 18, 2006	Kitt Peak	Spacewatch	HYG	2.5 km	MPC · JPL
489276	2006 SL_{100}	—	September 19, 2006	Kitt Peak	Spacewatch	KOR	980 m	MPC · JPL
489277	2006 SS_{106}	—	September 19, 2006	Kitt Peak	Spacewatch	THM	1.8 km	MPC · JPL
489278	2006 SF_{129}	—	July 21, 2006	Mount Lemmon	Mount Lemmon Survey	·	650 m	MPC · JPL
489279	2006 SF_{138}	—	September 20, 2006	Catalina	CSS	·	1.8 km	MPC · JPL
489280	2006 SA_{151}	—	September 19, 2006	Kitt Peak	Spacewatch	·	540 m	MPC · JPL
489281	2006 SG_{167}	—	September 25, 2006	Kitt Peak	Spacewatch	EUN	900 m	MPC · JPL
489282	2006 SO_{171}	—	September 17, 2006	Kitt Peak	Spacewatch	EUN	1.1 km	MPC · JPL
489283	2006 SM_{177}	—	September 14, 2006	Kitt Peak	Spacewatch	·	440 m	MPC · JPL
489284	2006 SW_{185}	—	September 25, 2006	Mount Lemmon	Mount Lemmon Survey	·	2.3 km	MPC · JPL
489285	2006 SL_{186}	—	September 25, 2006	Kitt Peak	Spacewatch	·	900 m	MPC · JPL
489286	2006 SM_{188}	—	September 18, 2006	Kitt Peak	Spacewatch	·	2.9 km	MPC · JPL
489287	2006 SD_{199}	—	September 24, 2006	Kitt Peak	Spacewatch	·	440 m	MPC · JPL
489288	2006 SN_{199}	—	September 15, 2006	Kitt Peak	Spacewatch	·	1.8 km	MPC · JPL
489289	2006 SJ_{204}	—	September 25, 2006	Kitt Peak	Spacewatch	THM	2.4 km	MPC · JPL
489290	2006 SH_{207}	—	September 25, 2006	Kitt Peak	Spacewatch	·	1.4 km	MPC · JPL
489291	2006 SC_{209}	—	September 18, 2006	Kitt Peak	Spacewatch	·	1.3 km	MPC · JPL
489292	2006 SJ_{218}	—	August 28, 2006	Kitt Peak	Spacewatch	·	1.3 km	MPC · JPL
489293	2006 SY_{225}	—	September 26, 2006	Kitt Peak	Spacewatch	·	980 m	MPC · JPL
489294	2006 ST_{226}	—	September 18, 2006	Kitt Peak	Spacewatch	·	1.5 km	MPC · JPL
489295	2006 SQ_{233}	—	September 26, 2006	Kitt Peak	Spacewatch	·	1.1 km	MPC · JPL
489296	2006 SU_{246}	—	September 26, 2006	Mount Lemmon	Mount Lemmon Survey	AST	1.5 km	MPC · JPL
489297	2006 SW_{248}	—	September 19, 2006	Kitt Peak	Spacewatch	·	1.6 km	MPC · JPL
489298	2006 SF_{255}	—	September 18, 2006	Catalina	CSS	·	540 m	MPC · JPL
489299	2006 SO_{257}	—	September 26, 2006	Kitt Peak	Spacewatch	HYG	2.3 km	MPC · JPL
489300	2006 SX_{259}	—	September 26, 2006	Kitt Peak	Spacewatch	·	2.0 km	MPC · JPL

== 489301–489400 ==
back to top

Designation			Discovery			Properties		Ref
Permanent	Provisional	Named after	Date	Site	Discoverer(s)	Category	Diam.	Ref
489301	2006 ST_{261}	—	September 26, 2006	Mount Lemmon	Mount Lemmon Survey	(5)	880 m	MPC · JPL
489302	2006 SR_{271}	—	September 27, 2006	Mount Lemmon	Mount Lemmon Survey	VER	2.5 km	MPC · JPL
489303	2006 SG_{287}	—	September 22, 2006	Anderson Mesa	LONEOS	PHO	880 m	MPC · JPL
489304	2006 SE_{296}	—	September 17, 2006	Kitt Peak	Spacewatch	·	1.6 km	MPC · JPL
489305	2006 SP_{310}	—	September 17, 2006	Kitt Peak	Spacewatch	·	1.7 km	MPC · JPL
489306	2006 SG_{319}	—	September 17, 2006	Kitt Peak	Spacewatch	·	1.5 km	MPC · JPL
489307	2006 SN_{319}	—	September 17, 2006	Kitt Peak	Spacewatch	·	1.3 km	MPC · JPL
489308	2006 ST_{320}	—	September 27, 2006	Kitt Peak	Spacewatch	(5)	1.1 km	MPC · JPL
489309	2006 SN_{322}	—	September 27, 2006	Kitt Peak	Spacewatch	·	1.3 km	MPC · JPL
489310	2006 SU_{322}	—	September 27, 2006	Kitt Peak	Spacewatch	·	1.8 km	MPC · JPL
489311	2006 SL_{327}	—	September 27, 2006	Kitt Peak	Spacewatch	THM	2.0 km	MPC · JPL
489312	2006 SB_{344}	—	September 28, 2006	Kitt Peak	Spacewatch	V	600 m	MPC · JPL
489313	2006 SS_{344}	—	September 28, 2006	Kitt Peak	Spacewatch	·	2.5 km	MPC · JPL
489314	2006 SA_{356}	—	September 30, 2006	Catalina	CSS	NYS	940 m	MPC · JPL
489315	2006 SP_{400}	—	September 25, 2006	Kitt Peak	Spacewatch	·	590 m	MPC · JPL
489316	2006 SP_{401}	—	September 30, 2006	Mount Lemmon	Mount Lemmon Survey	·	810 m	MPC · JPL
489317	2006 SB_{405}	—	September 25, 2006	Kitt Peak	Spacewatch	·	1.5 km	MPC · JPL
489318	2006 SB_{408}	—	September 27, 2006	Mount Lemmon	Mount Lemmon Survey	MAS	500 m	MPC · JPL
489319	2006 SS_{408}	—	September 17, 2006	Catalina	CSS	EUN	2.2 km	MPC · JPL
489320	2006 TO_{9}	—	September 30, 2006	Mount Lemmon	Mount Lemmon Survey	·	2.9 km	MPC · JPL
489321	2006 TO_{10}	—	October 14, 2006	Piszkéstető	K. Sárneczky, Kuli, Z.	·	2.2 km	MPC · JPL
489322	2006 TE_{12}	—	October 3, 2006	Kitt Peak	Spacewatch	·	1 km	MPC · JPL
489323	2006 TJ_{15}	—	October 11, 2006	Kitt Peak	Spacewatch	NYS	960 m	MPC · JPL
489324	2006 TY_{41}	—	September 26, 2006	Mount Lemmon	Mount Lemmon Survey	·	1.5 km	MPC · JPL
489325	2006 TM_{45}	—	October 12, 2006	Kitt Peak	Spacewatch	THM	2.4 km	MPC · JPL
489326	2006 TO_{54}	—	October 4, 2006	Mount Lemmon	Mount Lemmon Survey	·	790 m	MPC · JPL
489327	2006 TZ_{60}	—	October 4, 2006	Mount Lemmon	Mount Lemmon Survey	·	1.5 km	MPC · JPL
489328	2006 TQ_{65}	—	October 11, 2006	Palomar	NEAT	LIX	3.1 km	MPC · JPL
489329	2006 TC_{67}	—	September 28, 2006	Catalina	CSS	·	3.1 km	MPC · JPL
489330	2006 TX_{74}	—	October 11, 2006	Palomar	NEAT	·	1.1 km	MPC · JPL
489331	2006 TT_{81}	—	October 13, 2006	Kitt Peak	Spacewatch	·	2.6 km	MPC · JPL
489332	2006 TK_{91}	—	October 13, 2006	Kitt Peak	Spacewatch	·	1.9 km	MPC · JPL
489333	2006 TZ_{96}	—	October 12, 2006	Kitt Peak	Spacewatch	·	740 m	MPC · JPL
489334	2006 TA_{101}	—	October 2, 2006	Mount Lemmon	Mount Lemmon Survey	VER	2.7 km	MPC · JPL
489335	2006 TD_{128}	—	October 15, 2006	Kitt Peak	Spacewatch	DOR	1.5 km	MPC · JPL
489336	2006 TR_{129}	—	October 4, 2006	Mount Lemmon	Mount Lemmon Survey	·	1.0 km	MPC · JPL
489337	2006 UM	—	October 17, 2006	Catalina	CSS	AMO	710 m	MPC · JPL
489338	2006 UF_{7}	—	October 16, 2006	Catalina	CSS	·	2.9 km	MPC · JPL
489339	2006 UH_{14}	—	October 17, 2006	Mount Lemmon	Mount Lemmon Survey	·	2.6 km	MPC · JPL
489340	2006 UW_{23}	—	October 16, 2006	Kitt Peak	Spacewatch	·	520 m	MPC · JPL
489341	2006 UN_{24}	—	October 16, 2006	Kitt Peak	Spacewatch	·	3.5 km	MPC · JPL
489342	2006 UQ_{29}	—	October 16, 2006	Kitt Peak	Spacewatch	·	840 m	MPC · JPL
489343	2006 UP_{37}	—	September 26, 2006	Mount Lemmon	Mount Lemmon Survey	·	2.2 km	MPC · JPL
489344	2006 UZ_{39}	—	September 27, 2006	Mount Lemmon	Mount Lemmon Survey	·	1.9 km	MPC · JPL
489345	2006 UE_{41}	—	October 16, 2006	Kitt Peak	Spacewatch	·	1.7 km	MPC · JPL
489346	2006 US_{41}	—	October 16, 2006	Kitt Peak	Spacewatch	·	2.0 km	MPC · JPL
489347	2006 UP_{50}	—	September 25, 2006	Kitt Peak	Spacewatch	·	1.2 km	MPC · JPL
489348	2006 UU_{50}	—	October 17, 2006	Kitt Peak	Spacewatch	H	380 m	MPC · JPL
489349	2006 UB_{57}	—	October 18, 2006	Kitt Peak	Spacewatch	·	1.5 km	MPC · JPL
489350	2006 UC_{59}	—	September 28, 2006	Mount Lemmon	Mount Lemmon Survey	·	1.8 km	MPC · JPL
489351	2006 UX_{71}	—	October 17, 2006	Kitt Peak	Spacewatch	·	1.3 km	MPC · JPL
489352	2006 UP_{72}	—	September 30, 2006	Kitt Peak	Spacewatch	·	1.3 km	MPC · JPL
489353	2006 UJ_{74}	—	October 17, 2006	Kitt Peak	Spacewatch	·	1.5 km	MPC · JPL
489354	2006 UO_{81}	—	October 17, 2006	Kitt Peak	Spacewatch	·	2.7 km	MPC · JPL
489355	2006 UD_{88}	—	September 27, 2006	Mount Lemmon	Mount Lemmon Survey	·	1.5 km	MPC · JPL
489356	2006 UF_{95}	—	October 2, 2006	Mount Lemmon	Mount Lemmon Survey	KOR	1.1 km	MPC · JPL
489357	2006 UZ_{99}	—	October 18, 2006	Kitt Peak	Spacewatch	·	2.6 km	MPC · JPL
489358	2006 UH_{117}	—	October 19, 2006	Kitt Peak	Spacewatch	·	2.9 km	MPC · JPL
489359	2006 UU_{134}	—	September 30, 2006	Mount Lemmon	Mount Lemmon Survey	·	1.7 km	MPC · JPL
489360	2006 UW_{135}	—	October 19, 2006	Kitt Peak	Spacewatch	·	1.7 km	MPC · JPL
489361	2006 UL_{136}	—	October 19, 2006	Mount Lemmon	Mount Lemmon Survey	·	1.1 km	MPC · JPL
489362	2006 UT_{153}	—	September 17, 2006	Catalina	CSS	·	1.2 km	MPC · JPL
489363	2006 UY_{167}	—	October 25, 2001	Apache Point	SDSS	KOR	1.4 km	MPC · JPL
489364	2006 UW_{170}	—	October 3, 2006	Mount Lemmon	Mount Lemmon Survey	·	1.3 km	MPC · JPL
489365	2006 UZ_{170}	—	October 21, 2006	Mount Lemmon	Mount Lemmon Survey	·	1.6 km	MPC · JPL
489366	2006 UW_{172}	—	September 27, 2006	Kitt Peak	Spacewatch	·	2.3 km	MPC · JPL
489367	2006 UT_{184}	—	October 16, 2006	Catalina	CSS	·	2.3 km	MPC · JPL
489368	2006 UT_{191}	—	October 19, 2006	Catalina	CSS	·	3.1 km	MPC · JPL
489369	2006 UM_{193}	—	September 28, 2006	Kitt Peak	Spacewatch	·	3.5 km	MPC · JPL
489370	2006 UT_{193}	—	October 20, 2006	Kitt Peak	Spacewatch	·	710 m	MPC · JPL
489371	2006 UO_{201}	—	October 17, 2006	Mount Lemmon	Mount Lemmon Survey	·	1.8 km	MPC · JPL
489372	2006 UJ_{205}	—	October 23, 2006	Kitt Peak	Spacewatch	·	2.0 km	MPC · JPL
489373	2006 UQ_{210}	—	October 23, 2006	Kitt Peak	Spacewatch	·	850 m	MPC · JPL
489374	2006 UX_{210}	—	October 13, 2006	Kitt Peak	Spacewatch	GEF	960 m	MPC · JPL
489375	2006 UE_{214}	—	October 23, 2006	Kitt Peak	Spacewatch	·	3.3 km	MPC · JPL
489376	2006 UX_{223}	—	October 4, 2006	Mount Lemmon	Mount Lemmon Survey	·	1.6 km	MPC · JPL
489377	2006 UR_{227}	—	September 30, 2006	Catalina	CSS	EUN	1.1 km	MPC · JPL
489378	2006 UG_{231}	—	October 21, 2006	Mount Lemmon	Mount Lemmon Survey	·	1.2 km	MPC · JPL
489379	2006 UQ_{236}	—	October 23, 2006	Kitt Peak	Spacewatch	·	1.4 km	MPC · JPL
489380	2006 UR_{255}	—	September 26, 2006	Mount Lemmon	Mount Lemmon Survey	NEM	1.9 km	MPC · JPL
489381	2006 UD_{257}	—	September 25, 2006	Kitt Peak	Spacewatch	·	1.0 km	MPC · JPL
489382	2006 UG_{260}	—	October 28, 2006	Mount Lemmon	Mount Lemmon Survey	·	970 m	MPC · JPL
489383	2006 UU_{261}	—	October 28, 2006	Mount Lemmon	Mount Lemmon Survey	·	1.7 km	MPC · JPL
489384	2006 UZ_{261}	—	October 28, 2006	Mount Lemmon	Mount Lemmon Survey	(11882)	1.3 km	MPC · JPL
489385	2006 UG_{262}	—	October 16, 2006	Kitt Peak	Spacewatch	PHO	720 m	MPC · JPL
489386	2006 UC_{273}	—	October 19, 2006	Kitt Peak	Spacewatch	·	2.1 km	MPC · JPL
489387	2006 UC_{277}	—	September 28, 2006	Mount Lemmon	Mount Lemmon Survey	·	440 m	MPC · JPL
489388	2006 UG_{279}	—	September 27, 2006	Mount Lemmon	Mount Lemmon Survey	·	2.9 km	MPC · JPL
489389	2006 UX_{284}	—	October 28, 2006	Mount Lemmon	Mount Lemmon Survey	·	2.2 km	MPC · JPL
489390	2006 UD_{285}	—	September 28, 2006	Mount Lemmon	Mount Lemmon Survey	EOS	1.6 km	MPC · JPL
489391	2006 UE_{334}	—	October 16, 2006	Kitt Peak	Spacewatch	·	1.1 km	MPC · JPL
489392	2006 UF_{334}	—	October 18, 2006	Kitt Peak	Spacewatch	·	470 m	MPC · JPL
489393	2006 UG_{334}	—	October 19, 2006	Kitt Peak	Spacewatch	V	390 m	MPC · JPL
489394	2006 UN_{334}	—	October 19, 2006	Mount Lemmon	Mount Lemmon Survey	·	2.4 km	MPC · JPL
489395	2006 UX_{345}	—	October 16, 2006	Catalina	CSS	·	3.4 km	MPC · JPL
489396	2006 UQ_{358}	—	October 16, 2006	Kitt Peak	Spacewatch	·	2.2 km	MPC · JPL
489397	2006 UX_{359}	—	October 2, 2006	Mount Lemmon	Mount Lemmon Survey	·	1.2 km	MPC · JPL
489398	2006 VE_{2}	—	October 23, 2006	Catalina	CSS	·	560 m	MPC · JPL
489399	2006 VS_{3}	—	October 2, 2006	Mount Lemmon	Mount Lemmon Survey	·	510 m	MPC · JPL
489400	2006 VE_{7}	—	November 10, 2006	Kitt Peak	Spacewatch	·	2.0 km	MPC · JPL

== 489401–489500 ==
back to top

Designation			Discovery			Properties		Ref
Permanent	Provisional	Named after	Date	Site	Discoverer(s)	Category	Diam.	Ref
489401	2006 VP_{8}	—	November 11, 2006	Kitt Peak	Spacewatch	THM	1.9 km	MPC · JPL
489402	2006 VP_{10}	—	October 22, 2006	Kitt Peak	Spacewatch	·	2.5 km	MPC · JPL
489403	2006 VB_{11}	—	September 30, 2006	Mount Lemmon	Mount Lemmon Survey	·	720 m	MPC · JPL
489404	2006 VP_{14}	—	November 9, 2006	Kitt Peak	Spacewatch	·	2.4 km	MPC · JPL
489405	2006 VY_{20}	—	October 31, 2006	Mount Lemmon	Mount Lemmon Survey	ERI	1.4 km	MPC · JPL
489406	2006 VN_{25}	—	November 10, 2006	Kitt Peak	Spacewatch	CYB	2.5 km	MPC · JPL
489407	2006 VG_{27}	—	November 10, 2006	Kitt Peak	Spacewatch	·	1.2 km	MPC · JPL
489408	2006 VL_{30}	—	October 17, 2006	Mount Lemmon	Mount Lemmon Survey	·	1.7 km	MPC · JPL
489409	2006 VQ_{33}	—	October 12, 2006	Kitt Peak	Spacewatch	CYB	2.7 km	MPC · JPL
489410	2006 VK_{36}	—	October 22, 2006	Mount Lemmon	Mount Lemmon Survey	·	1.8 km	MPC · JPL
489411	2006 VP_{39}	—	October 16, 2006	Kitt Peak	Spacewatch	·	1.6 km	MPC · JPL
489412	2006 VF_{40}	—	October 28, 2006	Mount Lemmon	Mount Lemmon Survey	·	1.6 km	MPC · JPL
489413	2006 VT_{53}	—	September 27, 2006	Mount Lemmon	Mount Lemmon Survey	·	690 m	MPC · JPL
489414	2006 VM_{55}	—	November 11, 2006	Kitt Peak	Spacewatch	·	1.6 km	MPC · JPL
489415	2006 VG_{57}	—	November 11, 2006	Kitt Peak	Spacewatch	·	2.5 km	MPC · JPL
489416	2006 VQ_{70}	—	October 28, 2006	Mount Lemmon	Mount Lemmon Survey	·	940 m	MPC · JPL
489417	2006 VM_{76}	—	November 12, 2006	Mount Lemmon	Mount Lemmon Survey	·	1.2 km	MPC · JPL
489418	2006 VW_{83}	—	October 19, 2006	Mount Lemmon	Mount Lemmon Survey	·	1.4 km	MPC · JPL
489419	2006 VA_{96}	—	October 29, 2006	Mount Lemmon	Mount Lemmon Survey	EUN	1.0 km	MPC · JPL
489420	2006 VF_{105}	—	November 13, 2006	Kitt Peak	Spacewatch	·	640 m	MPC · JPL
489421	2006 VC_{121}	—	October 27, 2006	Catalina	CSS	·	2.1 km	MPC · JPL
489422	2006 VJ_{121}	—	November 14, 2006	Catalina	CSS	·	1.8 km	MPC · JPL
489423	2006 VB_{126}	—	November 15, 2006	Kitt Peak	Spacewatch	ADE	1.7 km	MPC · JPL
489424	2006 VN_{127}	—	November 15, 2006	Kitt Peak	Spacewatch	·	1.8 km	MPC · JPL
489425	2006 VP_{132}	—	September 28, 2006	Mount Lemmon	Mount Lemmon Survey	·	760 m	MPC · JPL
489426	2006 VE_{139}	—	November 1, 2006	Mount Lemmon	Mount Lemmon Survey	·	2.8 km	MPC · JPL
489427	2006 VF_{140}	—	November 15, 2006	Kitt Peak	Spacewatch	·	570 m	MPC · JPL
489428	2006 VC_{171}	—	November 13, 2006	Catalina	CSS	·	1.7 km	MPC · JPL
489429	2006 WM	—	November 16, 2006	Mount Nyukasa	Japan Aerospace Exploration Agency	·	680 m	MPC · JPL
489430	2006 WH_{28}	—	November 16, 2006	Mount Lemmon	Mount Lemmon Survey	·	1.2 km	MPC · JPL
489431	2006 WE_{32}	—	November 16, 2006	Kitt Peak	Spacewatch	·	1.7 km	MPC · JPL
489432	2006 WB_{33}	—	November 16, 2006	Mount Lemmon	Mount Lemmon Survey	·	1.5 km	MPC · JPL
489433	2006 WB_{53}	—	November 16, 2006	Catalina	CSS	·	1.8 km	MPC · JPL
489434	2006 WC_{71}	—	November 18, 2006	Kitt Peak	Spacewatch	NYS	1.0 km	MPC · JPL
489435	2006 WF_{73}	—	October 21, 2006	Kitt Peak	Spacewatch	·	1.7 km	MPC · JPL
489436	2006 WW_{86}	—	November 18, 2006	Kitt Peak	Spacewatch	·	2.5 km	MPC · JPL
489437	2006 WR_{95}	—	November 19, 2006	Kitt Peak	Spacewatch	MAS	580 m	MPC · JPL
489438	2006 WN_{99}	—	November 19, 2006	Kitt Peak	Spacewatch	·	1.5 km	MPC · JPL
489439	2006 WS_{175}	—	November 19, 2006	Kitt Peak	Spacewatch	DOR	1.8 km	MPC · JPL
489440	2006 WK_{193}	—	November 27, 2006	Kitt Peak	Spacewatch	·	570 m	MPC · JPL
489441	2006 WW_{198}	—	November 21, 2006	Mount Lemmon	Mount Lemmon Survey	MAS	660 m	MPC · JPL
489442	2006 XM_{13}	—	November 10, 2006	Kitt Peak	Spacewatch	·	1.6 km	MPC · JPL
489443	2006 XW_{33}	—	December 11, 2006	Kitt Peak	Spacewatch	·	1.8 km	MPC · JPL
489444	2006 XL_{62}	—	December 15, 2006	Kitt Peak	Spacewatch	·	2.0 km	MPC · JPL
489445	2006 XY_{63}	—	October 3, 2006	Mount Lemmon	Mount Lemmon Survey	·	2.0 km	MPC · JPL
489446	2006 YN_{5}	—	November 11, 2006	Kitt Peak	Spacewatch	·	2.9 km	MPC · JPL
489447	2006 YT_{28}	—	December 21, 2006	Kitt Peak	Spacewatch	·	640 m	MPC · JPL
489448	2006 YL_{48}	—	December 24, 2006	Kitt Peak	Spacewatch	·	1.3 km	MPC · JPL
489449	2006 YM_{54}	—	December 21, 2006	Kitt Peak	Spacewatch	·	1.5 km	MPC · JPL
489450	2007 AN_{13}	—	November 22, 2006	Mount Lemmon	Mount Lemmon Survey	THB	2.5 km	MPC · JPL
489451	2007 BZ_{2}	—	January 10, 2007	Kitt Peak	Spacewatch	·	650 m	MPC · JPL
489452	2007 BS_{21}	—	November 28, 2006	Mount Lemmon	Mount Lemmon Survey	·	1.6 km	MPC · JPL
489453	2007 BX_{48}	—	January 24, 2007	Mount Lemmon	Mount Lemmon Survey	APO	340 m	MPC · JPL
489454	2007 BY_{60}	—	December 13, 2006	Kitt Peak	Spacewatch	·	1.8 km	MPC · JPL
489455	2007 BV_{79}	—	January 26, 2007	Kitt Peak	Spacewatch	·	610 m	MPC · JPL
489456	2007 BC_{81}	—	January 27, 2007	Kitt Peak	Spacewatch	·	1.5 km	MPC · JPL
489457	2007 BW_{99}	—	November 27, 2006	Mount Lemmon	Mount Lemmon Survey	·	1.5 km	MPC · JPL
489458	2007 CJ_{1}	—	January 28, 2007	Mount Lemmon	Mount Lemmon Survey	DOR	2.5 km	MPC · JPL
489459	2007 CS_{27}	—	November 18, 2006	Mount Lemmon	Mount Lemmon Survey	·	1.8 km	MPC · JPL
489460	2007 CE_{37}	—	February 6, 2007	Mount Lemmon	Mount Lemmon Survey	·	1.6 km	MPC · JPL
489461	2007 CY_{64}	—	February 10, 2007	Mount Lemmon	Mount Lemmon Survey	·	1.1 km	MPC · JPL
489462	2007 CV_{73}	—	September 29, 2005	Mount Lemmon	Mount Lemmon Survey	·	830 m	MPC · JPL
489463	2007 DX_{8}	—	February 17, 2007	Kitt Peak	Spacewatch	·	610 m	MPC · JPL
489464	2007 DP_{16}	—	February 17, 2007	Kitt Peak	Spacewatch	·	1.6 km	MPC · JPL
489465	2007 DY_{27}	—	February 17, 2007	Kitt Peak	Spacewatch	·	2.1 km	MPC · JPL
489466	2007 DD_{31}	—	February 17, 2007	Kitt Peak	Spacewatch	·	620 m	MPC · JPL
489467	2007 DO_{38}	—	February 17, 2007	Kitt Peak	Spacewatch	·	580 m	MPC · JPL
489468	2007 DN_{62}	—	February 21, 2007	Kitt Peak	Spacewatch	·	900 m	MPC · JPL
489469	2007 DF_{67}	—	February 21, 2007	Kitt Peak	Spacewatch	·	610 m	MPC · JPL
489470	2007 DK_{71}	—	February 21, 2007	Kitt Peak	Spacewatch	·	590 m	MPC · JPL
489471	2007 DS_{75}	—	February 21, 2007	Kitt Peak	Spacewatch	NYS	900 m	MPC · JPL
489472	2007 DH_{83}	—	November 24, 2006	Mount Lemmon	Mount Lemmon Survey	·	2.5 km	MPC · JPL
489473	2007 DW_{95}	—	February 23, 2007	Kitt Peak	Spacewatch	BRA	1.4 km	MPC · JPL
489474	2007 DL_{115}	—	February 17, 2007	Kitt Peak	Spacewatch	·	580 m	MPC · JPL
489475	2007 ER_{4}	—	March 9, 2007	Mount Lemmon	Mount Lemmon Survey	·	2.4 km	MPC · JPL
489476	2007 EU_{9}	—	December 21, 2006	Mount Lemmon	Mount Lemmon Survey	BRA	1.9 km	MPC · JPL
489477	2007 EU_{47}	—	March 9, 2007	Mount Lemmon	Mount Lemmon Survey	·	650 m	MPC · JPL
489478	2007 ET_{89}	—	March 9, 2007	Kitt Peak	Spacewatch	BRA	1.5 km	MPC · JPL
489479	2007 EL_{136}	—	March 10, 2007	Mount Lemmon	Mount Lemmon Survey	·	1.2 km	MPC · JPL
489480	2007 EF_{151}	—	March 12, 2007	Mount Lemmon	Mount Lemmon Survey	·	520 m	MPC · JPL
489481	2007 EZ_{161}	—	January 29, 2007	Kitt Peak	Spacewatch	·	1.6 km	MPC · JPL
489482	2007 ED_{162}	—	January 27, 2007	Kitt Peak	Spacewatch	·	560 m	MPC · JPL
489483	2007 EC_{190}	—	February 23, 2007	Mount Lemmon	Mount Lemmon Survey	·	1.9 km	MPC · JPL
489484	2007 EJ_{219}	—	March 14, 2007	Kitt Peak	Spacewatch	·	1.8 km	MPC · JPL
489485	2007 FQ_{31}	—	March 15, 2007	Kitt Peak	Spacewatch	·	1.8 km	MPC · JPL
489486	2007 GS_{3}	—	April 11, 2007	Siding Spring	SSS	APO · PHA · moon	470 m	MPC · JPL
489487	2007 GV_{38}	—	March 13, 2007	Mount Lemmon	Mount Lemmon Survey	EMA	2.7 km	MPC · JPL
489488	2007 GE_{46}	—	April 14, 2007	Kitt Peak	Spacewatch	·	540 m	MPC · JPL
489489	2007 GN_{59}	—	April 15, 2007	Kitt Peak	Spacewatch	·	1.3 km	MPC · JPL
489490	2007 GA_{62}	—	April 15, 2007	Kitt Peak	Spacewatch	·	2.7 km	MPC · JPL
489491	2007 GJ_{64}	—	April 11, 2007	Mount Lemmon	Mount Lemmon Survey	·	490 m	MPC · JPL
489492	2007 GW_{75}	—	April 11, 2007	Kitt Peak	Spacewatch	·	590 m	MPC · JPL
489493	2007 HL_{20}	—	April 18, 2007	Kitt Peak	Spacewatch	·	520 m	MPC · JPL
489494	2007 HW_{73}	—	November 26, 2005	Mount Lemmon	Mount Lemmon Survey	·	580 m	MPC · JPL
489495	2007 JA_{7}	—	May 9, 2007	Mount Lemmon	Mount Lemmon Survey	·	1.4 km	MPC · JPL
489496	2007 JS_{8}	—	May 9, 2007	Mount Lemmon	Mount Lemmon Survey	·	630 m	MPC · JPL
489497	2007 JM_{14}	—	May 10, 2007	Mount Lemmon	Mount Lemmon Survey	·	1.6 km	MPC · JPL
489498	2007 JP_{45}	—	April 22, 2007	Mount Lemmon	Mount Lemmon Survey	·	640 m	MPC · JPL
489499	2007 LG_{10}	—	April 25, 2007	Mount Lemmon	Mount Lemmon Survey	·	2.1 km	MPC · JPL
489500	2007 LY_{11}	—	May 11, 2007	Mount Lemmon	Mount Lemmon Survey	·	800 m	MPC · JPL

== 489501–489600 ==
back to top

Designation			Discovery			Properties		Ref
Permanent	Provisional	Named after	Date	Site	Discoverer(s)	Category	Diam.	Ref
489501	2007 LD_{17}	—	May 26, 2007	Mount Lemmon	Mount Lemmon Survey	·	530 m	MPC · JPL
489502	2007 LF_{22}	—	June 13, 2007	Kitt Peak	Spacewatch	·	1.8 km	MPC · JPL
489503	2007 LR_{28}	—	June 15, 2007	Kitt Peak	Spacewatch	EOS	1.7 km	MPC · JPL
489504	2007 MU_{8}	—	April 25, 2007	Kitt Peak	Spacewatch	H	460 m	MPC · JPL
489505	2007 MK_{14}	—	June 8, 2007	Kitt Peak	Spacewatch	H	520 m	MPC · JPL
489506	2007 ME_{24}	—	June 26, 2007	Catalina	CSS	H	570 m	MPC · JPL
489507	2007 NJ_{6}	—	July 10, 2007	Siding Spring	SSS	·	1.4 km	MPC · JPL
489508	2007 OL_{10}	—	July 19, 2007	Siding Spring	SSS	·	520 m	MPC · JPL
489509	2007 PH_{1}	—	August 5, 2007	Altschwendt	W. Ries	ADE	1.3 km	MPC · JPL
489510	2007 PS_{8}	—	August 8, 2007	Socorro	LINEAR	·	1.4 km	MPC · JPL
489511	2007 PM_{21}	—	August 9, 2007	Socorro	LINEAR	H	470 m	MPC · JPL
489512	2007 PT_{22}	—	August 11, 2007	Socorro	LINEAR	·	930 m	MPC · JPL
489513	2007 PC_{35}	—	August 9, 2007	Socorro	LINEAR	·	1.5 km	MPC · JPL
489514	2007 PY_{48}	—	August 9, 2007	Kitt Peak	Spacewatch	·	810 m	MPC · JPL
489515	2007 PJ_{49}	—	August 8, 2007	Socorro	LINEAR	V	740 m	MPC · JPL
489516	2007 PP_{49}	—	August 10, 2007	Kitt Peak	Spacewatch	·	2.5 km	MPC · JPL
489517	2007 PF_{50}	—	August 12, 2007	Socorro	LINEAR	·	2.7 km	MPC · JPL
489518	2007 QS_{6}	—	August 21, 2007	Anderson Mesa	LONEOS	MAS	680 m	MPC · JPL
489519	2007 QZ_{8}	—	August 9, 2007	Kitt Peak	Spacewatch	·	670 m	MPC · JPL
489520	2007 RG_{9}	—	September 2, 2007	Catalina	CSS	·	1.3 km	MPC · JPL
489521	2007 RN_{27}	—	September 4, 2007	Mount Lemmon	Mount Lemmon Survey	AGN	1.1 km	MPC · JPL
489522	2007 RR_{31}	—	September 5, 2007	Catalina	CSS	·	1.5 km	MPC · JPL
489523	2007 RD_{42}	—	September 9, 2007	Kitt Peak	Spacewatch	V	530 m	MPC · JPL
489524	2007 RF_{42}	—	September 9, 2007	Kitt Peak	Spacewatch	·	3.4 km	MPC · JPL
489525	2007 RG_{50}	—	September 9, 2007	Kitt Peak	Spacewatch	·	1.1 km	MPC · JPL
489526	2007 RR_{51}	—	September 9, 2007	Kitt Peak	Spacewatch	·	770 m	MPC · JPL
489527	2007 RR_{56}	—	September 9, 2007	Kitt Peak	Spacewatch	·	830 m	MPC · JPL
489528	2007 RV_{64}	—	September 10, 2007	Mount Lemmon	Mount Lemmon Survey	(5)	730 m	MPC · JPL
489529	2007 RX_{71}	—	September 10, 2007	Kitt Peak	Spacewatch	·	810 m	MPC · JPL
489530	2007 RU_{73}	—	September 10, 2007	Mount Lemmon	Mount Lemmon Survey	·	1.3 km	MPC · JPL
489531	2007 RG_{81}	—	September 10, 2007	Catalina	CSS	·	1.6 km	MPC · JPL
489532	2007 RX_{127}	—	September 12, 2007	Mount Lemmon	Mount Lemmon Survey	critical	580 m	MPC · JPL
489533	2007 RH_{132}	—	September 12, 2007	Mount Lemmon	Mount Lemmon Survey	·	1.2 km	MPC · JPL
489534	2007 RG_{147}	—	September 5, 2007	Catalina	CSS	slow	3.0 km	MPC · JPL
489535	2007 RS_{153}	—	September 10, 2007	Kitt Peak	Spacewatch	L4	7.8 km	MPC · JPL
489536	2007 RK_{157}	—	August 10, 2007	Kitt Peak	Spacewatch	·	1.1 km	MPC · JPL
489537	2007 RK_{164}	—	September 10, 2007	Kitt Peak	Spacewatch	AGN	890 m	MPC · JPL
489538	2007 RT_{166}	—	September 10, 2007	Kitt Peak	Spacewatch	·	1.6 km	MPC · JPL
489539	2007 RJ_{167}	—	September 10, 2007	Kitt Peak	Spacewatch	·	2.5 km	MPC · JPL
489540	2007 RO_{172}	—	September 10, 2007	Kitt Peak	Spacewatch	CYB	2.6 km	MPC · JPL
489541	2007 RL_{204}	—	September 9, 2007	Kitt Peak	Spacewatch	·	1.7 km	MPC · JPL
489542	2007 RM_{220}	—	September 14, 2007	Mount Lemmon	Mount Lemmon Survey	·	2.0 km	MPC · JPL
489543	2007 RD_{221}	—	September 14, 2007	Mount Lemmon	Mount Lemmon Survey	·	2.7 km	MPC · JPL
489544	2007 RM_{234}	—	September 12, 2007	Mount Lemmon	Mount Lemmon Survey	·	1.1 km	MPC · JPL
489545	2007 RW_{258}	—	September 5, 2007	Catalina	CSS	·	1.3 km	MPC · JPL
489546	2007 RB_{259}	—	September 14, 2007	Mount Lemmon	Mount Lemmon Survey	·	1.6 km	MPC · JPL
489547	2007 RD_{264}	—	August 10, 2007	Kitt Peak	Spacewatch	·	1.9 km	MPC · JPL
489548	2007 RC_{271}	—	September 15, 2007	Kitt Peak	Spacewatch	PHO	730 m	MPC · JPL
489549	2007 RT_{286}	—	September 4, 2007	Mount Lemmon	Mount Lemmon Survey	V	700 m	MPC · JPL
489550	2007 RT_{288}	—	September 14, 2007	Mount Lemmon	Mount Lemmon Survey	·	1.7 km	MPC · JPL
489551	2007 RZ_{289}	—	September 14, 2007	Mount Lemmon	Mount Lemmon Survey	·	2.0 km	MPC · JPL
489552	2007 RH_{292}	—	September 12, 2007	Mount Lemmon	Mount Lemmon Survey	·	970 m	MPC · JPL
489553	2007 RF_{297}	—	September 10, 2007	Kitt Peak	Spacewatch	·	1.8 km	MPC · JPL
489554	2007 RZ_{298}	—	September 12, 2007	Anderson Mesa	LONEOS	·	840 m	MPC · JPL
489555	2007 RM_{311}	—	September 13, 2007	Catalina	CSS	H	510 m	MPC · JPL
489556	2007 RN_{323}	—	September 9, 2007	Mount Lemmon	Mount Lemmon Survey	·	1 km	MPC · JPL
489557	2007 SP_{11}	—	September 25, 2007	Mount Lemmon	Mount Lemmon Survey	·	1.8 km	MPC · JPL
489558	2007 SW_{21}	—	September 20, 2007	Catalina	CSS	·	1.3 km	MPC · JPL
489559	2007 TV_{2}	—	October 2, 2007	Majdanak	Majdanak	·	1.8 km	MPC · JPL
489560	2007 TG_{11}	—	October 6, 2007	Socorro	LINEAR	·	1.7 km	MPC · JPL
489561	2007 TA_{18}	—	October 4, 2007	Kitt Peak	Spacewatch	·	1.6 km	MPC · JPL
489562	2007 TU_{21}	—	October 4, 2007	Catalina	CSS	NYS	1.1 km	MPC · JPL
489563	2007 TB_{27}	—	September 11, 2007	Mount Lemmon	Mount Lemmon Survey	MAS	620 m	MPC · JPL
489564	2007 TY_{28}	—	October 4, 2007	Kitt Peak	Spacewatch	·	1.0 km	MPC · JPL
489565	2007 TZ_{29}	—	September 15, 2007	Mount Lemmon	Mount Lemmon Survey	·	940 m	MPC · JPL
489566	2007 TK_{30}	—	September 8, 2007	Mount Lemmon	Mount Lemmon Survey	·	1.8 km	MPC · JPL
489567	2007 TE_{34}	—	September 12, 2007	Mount Lemmon	Mount Lemmon Survey	(5)	1.1 km	MPC · JPL
489568	2007 TR_{37}	—	September 12, 2007	Mount Lemmon	Mount Lemmon Survey	·	1.2 km	MPC · JPL
489569	2007 TU_{38}	—	September 9, 2007	Mount Lemmon	Mount Lemmon Survey	·	970 m	MPC · JPL
489570	2007 TR_{58}	—	October 5, 2007	Kitt Peak	Spacewatch	MAR	750 m	MPC · JPL
489571	2007 TC_{60}	—	October 5, 2007	Kitt Peak	Spacewatch	EOS	1.6 km	MPC · JPL
489572	2007 TK_{61}	—	September 8, 2007	Mount Lemmon	Mount Lemmon Survey	·	980 m	MPC · JPL
489573	2007 TM_{61}	—	September 15, 2007	Mount Lemmon	Mount Lemmon Survey	·	950 m	MPC · JPL
489574	2007 TP_{65}	—	October 9, 2007	Needville	J. Dellinger, T. E. Rabben	·	1.2 km	MPC · JPL
489575	2007 TT_{66}	—	October 8, 2007	Catalina	CSS	·	1.5 km	MPC · JPL
489576	2007 TW_{75}	—	October 4, 2007	Kitt Peak	Spacewatch	·	1.3 km	MPC · JPL
489577	2007 TE_{83}	—	September 13, 2007	Mount Lemmon	Mount Lemmon Survey	·	1.2 km	MPC · JPL
489578	2007 TF_{84}	—	October 8, 2007	Catalina	CSS	·	2.7 km	MPC · JPL
489579	2007 TH_{88}	—	October 8, 2007	Mount Lemmon	Mount Lemmon Survey	·	1.2 km	MPC · JPL
489580	2007 TZ_{94}	—	October 7, 2007	Catalina	CSS	H	620 m	MPC · JPL
489581	2007 TB_{100}	—	October 8, 2007	Mount Lemmon	Mount Lemmon Survey	·	2.0 km	MPC · JPL
489582	2007 TM_{103}	—	September 12, 2007	Mount Lemmon	Mount Lemmon Survey	·	820 m	MPC · JPL
489583	2007 TK_{105}	—	September 13, 2007	Mount Lemmon	Mount Lemmon Survey	·	960 m	MPC · JPL
489584	2007 TS_{110}	—	October 8, 2007	Catalina	CSS	·	2.6 km	MPC · JPL
489585	2007 TG_{122}	—	October 6, 2007	Kitt Peak	Spacewatch	·	1 km	MPC · JPL
489586	2007 TP_{122}	—	September 20, 2001	Kitt Peak	Spacewatch	THM	2.1 km	MPC · JPL
489587	2007 TC_{126}	—	October 6, 2007	Kitt Peak	Spacewatch	·	1.7 km	MPC · JPL
489588	2007 TD_{126}	—	October 6, 2007	Kitt Peak	Spacewatch	MAS	600 m	MPC · JPL
489589	2007 TW_{129}	—	September 15, 2007	Mount Lemmon	Mount Lemmon Survey	·	1.5 km	MPC · JPL
489590	2007 TW_{136}	—	October 8, 2007	Catalina	CSS	JUN	1.3 km	MPC · JPL
489591	2007 TM_{137}	—	September 25, 2007	Mount Lemmon	Mount Lemmon Survey	·	1.9 km	MPC · JPL
489592	2007 TP_{140}	—	October 9, 2007	Mount Lemmon	Mount Lemmon Survey	·	920 m	MPC · JPL
489593	2007 TJ_{148}	—	September 11, 2007	Catalina	CSS	·	880 m	MPC · JPL
489594	2007 TA_{150}	—	October 9, 2007	Socorro	LINEAR	·	1.5 km	MPC · JPL
489595	2007 TT_{152}	—	September 15, 2007	Kitt Peak	Spacewatch	·	1.1 km	MPC · JPL
489596	2007 TN_{160}	—	October 8, 2007	Catalina	CSS	·	2.8 km	MPC · JPL
489597	2007 TV_{161}	—	October 11, 2007	Socorro	LINEAR	·	730 m	MPC · JPL
489598	2007 TK_{163}	—	October 9, 2007	Mount Lemmon	Mount Lemmon Survey	·	1.3 km	MPC · JPL
489599	2007 TN_{165}	—	October 10, 2007	XuYi	PMO NEO Survey Program	·	3.2 km	MPC · JPL
489600	2007 TR_{168}	—	October 12, 2007	Socorro	LINEAR	NYS	1.1 km	MPC · JPL

== 489601–489700 ==
back to top

Designation			Discovery			Properties		Ref
Permanent	Provisional	Named after	Date	Site	Discoverer(s)	Category	Diam.	Ref
489601	2007 TQ_{170}	—	October 12, 2007	Socorro	LINEAR	·	1.5 km	MPC · JPL
489602	2007 TT_{175}	—	April 12, 2004	Anderson Mesa	LONEOS	TIR	3.2 km	MPC · JPL
489603 Kurtschreckling	2007 TU_{184}	Kurtschreckling	October 13, 2007	Gaisberg	Gierlinger, R.	·	1.3 km	MPC · JPL
489604	2007 TR_{190}	—	October 4, 2007	Mount Lemmon	Mount Lemmon Survey	AEO	980 m	MPC · JPL
489605	2007 TR_{194}	—	October 7, 2007	Mount Lemmon	Mount Lemmon Survey	·	1 km	MPC · JPL
489606	2007 TP_{195}	—	October 7, 2007	Mount Lemmon	Mount Lemmon Survey	CLA	1.4 km	MPC · JPL
489607	2007 TY_{197}	—	October 8, 2007	Kitt Peak	Spacewatch	·	2.5 km	MPC · JPL
489608	2007 TL_{202}	—	October 8, 2007	Mount Lemmon	Mount Lemmon Survey	·	670 m	MPC · JPL
489609	2007 TJ_{215}	—	September 12, 2007	Mount Lemmon	Mount Lemmon Survey	·	820 m	MPC · JPL
489610	2007 TP_{219}	—	October 8, 2007	Mount Lemmon	Mount Lemmon Survey	·	2.0 km	MPC · JPL
489611	2007 TO_{224}	—	October 11, 2007	Kitt Peak	Spacewatch	·	910 m	MPC · JPL
489612	2007 TV_{225}	—	October 8, 2007	Kitt Peak	Spacewatch	·	780 m	MPC · JPL
489613	2007 TN_{234}	—	October 8, 2007	Kitt Peak	Spacewatch	·	2.9 km	MPC · JPL
489614	2007 TO_{242}	—	September 9, 2007	Anderson Mesa	LONEOS	·	1.7 km	MPC · JPL
489615	2007 TZ_{246}	—	October 9, 2007	Mount Lemmon	Mount Lemmon Survey	·	1.0 km	MPC · JPL
489616	2007 TJ_{256}	—	October 10, 2007	Kitt Peak	Spacewatch	PHO	900 m	MPC · JPL
489617	2007 TY_{268}	—	October 9, 2007	Kitt Peak	Spacewatch	·	2.8 km	MPC · JPL
489618	2007 TB_{277}	—	October 7, 2007	Catalina	CSS	·	560 m	MPC · JPL
489619	2007 TC_{278}	—	October 4, 2007	Kitt Peak	Spacewatch	·	510 m	MPC · JPL
489620	2007 TO_{281}	—	October 7, 2007	Mount Lemmon	Mount Lemmon Survey	·	1.8 km	MPC · JPL
489621	2007 TW_{300}	—	September 25, 2007	Mount Lemmon	Mount Lemmon Survey	·	2.0 km	MPC · JPL
489622	2007 TS_{308}	—	August 23, 2007	Kitt Peak	Spacewatch	·	2.2 km	MPC · JPL
489623	2007 TR_{310}	—	October 11, 2007	Kitt Peak	Spacewatch	AGN	1.1 km	MPC · JPL
489624	2007 TE_{318}	—	October 12, 2007	Kitt Peak	Spacewatch	NYS	950 m	MPC · JPL
489625	2007 TU_{323}	—	October 11, 2007	Kitt Peak	Spacewatch	CYB	3.2 km	MPC · JPL
489626	2007 TE_{324}	—	October 11, 2007	Kitt Peak	Spacewatch	(5)	790 m	MPC · JPL
489627	2007 TJ_{334}	—	October 11, 2007	Kitt Peak	Spacewatch	EOS	1.3 km	MPC · JPL
489628	2007 TV_{335}	—	October 12, 2007	Kitt Peak	Spacewatch	V	630 m	MPC · JPL
489629	2007 TZ_{345}	—	September 10, 2007	Kitt Peak	Spacewatch	HYG	2.2 km	MPC · JPL
489630	2007 TE_{355}	—	October 11, 2007	Catalina	CSS	·	2.0 km	MPC · JPL
489631	2007 TN_{361}	—	October 15, 2007	Mount Lemmon	Mount Lemmon Survey	·	1.0 km	MPC · JPL
489632	2007 TE_{367}	—	October 9, 2007	Purple Mountain	PMO NEO Survey Program	·	1.5 km	MPC · JPL
489633	2007 TE_{369}	—	September 12, 2007	Mount Lemmon	Mount Lemmon Survey	·	1.1 km	MPC · JPL
489634	2007 TR_{386}	—	October 15, 2007	Kitt Peak	Spacewatch	·	1.4 km	MPC · JPL
489635	2007 TO_{391}	—	October 13, 2007	Catalina	CSS	DOR	2.1 km	MPC · JPL
489636	2007 TN_{395}	—	September 25, 2007	Mount Lemmon	Mount Lemmon Survey	NAE	2.6 km	MPC · JPL
489637	2007 TA_{413}	—	September 14, 2007	Catalina	CSS	·	2.0 km	MPC · JPL
489638	2007 TY_{417}	—	September 15, 2007	Catalina	CSS	PHO	1.3 km	MPC · JPL
489639	2007 TC_{424}	—	October 7, 2007	Catalina	CSS	(5)	1 km	MPC · JPL
489640	2007 TT_{425}	—	October 8, 2007	Mount Lemmon	Mount Lemmon Survey	·	1.7 km	MPC · JPL
489641	2007 TO_{427}	—	October 10, 2007	Kitt Peak	Spacewatch	MRX	960 m	MPC · JPL
489642	2007 TQ_{427}	—	October 10, 2007	Kitt Peak	Spacewatch	T_{j} (2.99)	3.3 km	MPC · JPL
489643	2007 TH_{436}	—	October 4, 2007	Catalina	CSS	MAS	820 m	MPC · JPL
489644	2007 TP_{437}	—	September 13, 2007	Mount Lemmon	Mount Lemmon Survey	·	1.3 km	MPC · JPL
489645	2007 TL_{443}	—	October 7, 2007	Catalina	CSS	·	910 m	MPC · JPL
489646	2007 TD_{444}	—	October 4, 2007	Catalina	CSS	·	1.0 km	MPC · JPL
489647	2007 UA_{10}	—	October 17, 2007	Anderson Mesa	LONEOS	·	1.1 km	MPC · JPL
489648	2007 US_{13}	—	October 16, 2007	Mount Lemmon	Mount Lemmon Survey	V	550 m	MPC · JPL
489649	2007 UG_{17}	—	September 11, 2007	Mount Lemmon	Mount Lemmon Survey	KOR	1.1 km	MPC · JPL
489650	2007 UX_{19}	—	September 14, 2007	Mount Lemmon	Mount Lemmon Survey	·	940 m	MPC · JPL
489651	2007 UB_{23}	—	October 8, 2007	Kitt Peak	Spacewatch	·	1.1 km	MPC · JPL
489652	2007 UP_{25}	—	October 16, 2007	Kitt Peak	Spacewatch	·	1.9 km	MPC · JPL
489653	2007 UD_{36}	—	October 19, 2007	Catalina	CSS	·	650 m	MPC · JPL
489654	2007 UA_{38}	—	October 19, 2007	Kitt Peak	Spacewatch	·	3.3 km	MPC · JPL
489655	2007 UY_{52}	—	October 8, 2007	Kitt Peak	Spacewatch	·	1.0 km	MPC · JPL
489656	2007 UP_{53}	—	September 16, 2003	Kitt Peak	Spacewatch	·	1.2 km	MPC · JPL
489657	2007 UH_{69}	—	October 30, 2007	Mount Lemmon	Mount Lemmon Survey	KOR	1.3 km	MPC · JPL
489658	2007 UK_{87}	—	September 18, 2007	Mount Lemmon	Mount Lemmon Survey	·	1.5 km	MPC · JPL
489659	2007 UB_{90}	—	April 24, 2004	Kitt Peak	Spacewatch	·	2.9 km	MPC · JPL
489660	2007 UQ_{97}	—	September 10, 2007	Mount Lemmon	Mount Lemmon Survey	·	2.0 km	MPC · JPL
489661	2007 UF_{98}	—	October 30, 2007	Kitt Peak	Spacewatch	THM	1.7 km	MPC · JPL
489662	2007 UG_{104}	—	September 15, 2007	Mount Lemmon	Mount Lemmon Survey	·	860 m	MPC · JPL
489663	2007 UH_{105}	—	October 30, 2007	Kitt Peak	Spacewatch	NYS	660 m	MPC · JPL
489664	2007 UW_{115}	—	October 31, 2007	Mount Lemmon	Mount Lemmon Survey	·	1.1 km	MPC · JPL
489665	2007 UW_{121}	—	October 20, 2007	Kitt Peak	Spacewatch	·	1.0 km	MPC · JPL
489666	2007 UL_{122}	—	October 20, 2007	Kitt Peak	Spacewatch	BRG	910 m	MPC · JPL
489667	2007 UQ_{122}	—	September 14, 2007	Mount Lemmon	Mount Lemmon Survey	·	1.6 km	MPC · JPL
489668	2007 UU_{128}	—	October 23, 2007	Kitt Peak	Spacewatch	·	3.3 km	MPC · JPL
489669	2007 UG_{129}	—	October 19, 2007	Mount Lemmon	Mount Lemmon Survey	·	2.0 km	MPC · JPL
489670	2007 UJ_{135}	—	October 19, 2007	Mount Lemmon	Mount Lemmon Survey	·	1.5 km	MPC · JPL
489671	2007 UO_{141}	—	October 16, 2007	Mount Lemmon	Mount Lemmon Survey	·	1.1 km	MPC · JPL
489672	2007 VH_{10}	—	November 5, 2007	Kitt Peak	Spacewatch	H	550 m	MPC · JPL
489673	2007 VE_{15}	—	November 1, 2007	Kitt Peak	Spacewatch	·	670 m	MPC · JPL
489674	2007 VB_{28}	—	October 10, 2007	Mount Lemmon	Mount Lemmon Survey	·	1.4 km	MPC · JPL
489675	2007 VH_{34}	—	November 3, 2007	Kitt Peak	Spacewatch	·	1.8 km	MPC · JPL
489676	2007 VT_{46}	—	November 1, 2007	Kitt Peak	Spacewatch	·	1.9 km	MPC · JPL
489677	2007 VH_{47}	—	October 16, 2007	Mount Lemmon	Mount Lemmon Survey	·	870 m	MPC · JPL
489678	2007 VZ_{47}	—	November 1, 2007	Kitt Peak	Spacewatch	·	1 km	MPC · JPL
489679	2007 VK_{48}	—	October 9, 2007	Kitt Peak	Spacewatch	·	1.5 km	MPC · JPL
489680	2007 VQ_{56}	—	November 1, 2007	Kitt Peak	Spacewatch	·	1.1 km	MPC · JPL
489681	2007 VS_{56}	—	November 1, 2007	Kitt Peak	Spacewatch	GEF	750 m	MPC · JPL
489682	2007 VV_{64}	—	November 1, 2007	Kitt Peak	Spacewatch	·	950 m	MPC · JPL
489683	2007 VG_{74}	—	October 7, 2007	Mount Lemmon	Mount Lemmon Survey	·	1.3 km	MPC · JPL
489684	2007 VH_{77}	—	November 3, 2007	Kitt Peak	Spacewatch	·	2.2 km	MPC · JPL
489685	2007 VY_{85}	—	October 9, 2007	Catalina	CSS	H	550 m	MPC · JPL
489686	2007 VH_{88}	—	November 8, 2007	Catalina	CSS	H	540 m	MPC · JPL
489687	2007 VU_{89}	—	October 12, 2007	Kitt Peak	Spacewatch	·	1.2 km	MPC · JPL
489688	2007 VY_{94}	—	September 26, 2007	Mount Lemmon	Mount Lemmon Survey	·	1.7 km	MPC · JPL
489689	2007 VS_{96}	—	September 26, 2007	Mount Lemmon	Mount Lemmon Survey	·	560 m	MPC · JPL
489690	2007 VP_{98}	—	September 26, 2007	Mount Lemmon	Mount Lemmon Survey	·	690 m	MPC · JPL
489691	2007 VW_{99}	—	November 2, 2007	Kitt Peak	Spacewatch	·	1.2 km	MPC · JPL
489692	2007 VK_{106}	—	November 3, 2007	Kitt Peak	Spacewatch	·	1.2 km	MPC · JPL
489693	2007 VH_{107}	—	November 3, 2007	Kitt Peak	Spacewatch	·	860 m	MPC · JPL
489694	2007 VN_{108}	—	October 10, 2007	Mount Lemmon	Mount Lemmon Survey	·	1.1 km	MPC · JPL
489695	2007 VA_{113}	—	November 3, 2007	Kitt Peak	Spacewatch	·	960 m	MPC · JPL
489696	2007 VC_{119}	—	November 4, 2007	Kitt Peak	Spacewatch	EUN	770 m	MPC · JPL
489697	2007 VK_{120}	—	September 12, 2007	Mount Lemmon	Mount Lemmon Survey	NYS	980 m	MPC · JPL
489698	2007 VY_{123}	—	October 18, 2007	Kitt Peak	Spacewatch	·	1.2 km	MPC · JPL
489699	2007 VG_{124}	—	September 14, 2007	Mount Lemmon	Mount Lemmon Survey	·	1.1 km	MPC · JPL
489700	2007 VK_{125}	—	November 5, 2007	XuYi	PMO NEO Survey Program	H	570 m	MPC · JPL

== 489701–489800 ==
back to top

Designation			Discovery			Properties		Ref
Permanent	Provisional	Named after	Date	Site	Discoverer(s)	Category	Diam.	Ref
489701	2007 VV_{135}	—	November 3, 2007	Mount Lemmon	Mount Lemmon Survey	·	2.0 km	MPC · JPL
489702	2007 VL_{155}	—	November 5, 2007	Kitt Peak	Spacewatch	·	860 m	MPC · JPL
489703	2007 VR_{157}	—	September 10, 2007	Mount Lemmon	Mount Lemmon Survey	·	2.6 km	MPC · JPL
489704	2007 VY_{158}	—	November 5, 2007	Kitt Peak	Spacewatch	·	570 m	MPC · JPL
489705	2007 VK_{160}	—	November 5, 2007	Kitt Peak	Spacewatch	·	1.8 km	MPC · JPL
489706	2007 VG_{171}	—	November 7, 2007	Kitt Peak	Spacewatch	·	780 m	MPC · JPL
489707	2007 VQ_{177}	—	September 14, 2007	Mount Lemmon	Mount Lemmon Survey	·	1.0 km	MPC · JPL
489708	2007 VL_{183}	—	November 8, 2007	Catalina	CSS	·	890 m	MPC · JPL
489709	2007 VH_{202}	—	November 6, 2007	Kitt Peak	Spacewatch	·	2.7 km	MPC · JPL
489710	2007 VK_{213}	—	November 1, 2007	Kitt Peak	Spacewatch	NYS	700 m	MPC · JPL
489711	2007 VU_{215}	—	November 1, 2007	Kitt Peak	Spacewatch	EOS	1.9 km	MPC · JPL
489712	2007 VY_{230}	—	October 17, 2007	Mount Lemmon	Mount Lemmon Survey	KOR	1.3 km	MPC · JPL
489713	2007 VD_{237}	—	October 30, 2007	Mount Lemmon	Mount Lemmon Survey	·	1.8 km	MPC · JPL
489714	2007 VR_{237}	—	November 11, 2007	Mount Lemmon	Mount Lemmon Survey	·	990 m	MPC · JPL
489715	2007 VP_{239}	—	November 5, 2007	Kitt Peak	Spacewatch	·	1.6 km	MPC · JPL
489716	2007 VX_{242}	—	November 13, 2007	Mount Lemmon	Mount Lemmon Survey	·	1.1 km	MPC · JPL
489717	2007 VA_{243}	—	October 9, 2007	Mount Lemmon	Mount Lemmon Survey	·	640 m	MPC · JPL
489718	2007 VK_{245}	—	November 14, 2007	Bisei SG Center	BATTeRS	H	520 m	MPC · JPL
489719	2007 VH_{253}	—	November 2, 2007	Catalina	CSS	PHO	1.1 km	MPC · JPL
489720	2007 VE_{278}	—	November 14, 2007	Kitt Peak	Spacewatch	·	1.0 km	MPC · JPL
489721	2007 VD_{290}	—	November 14, 2007	Kitt Peak	Spacewatch	(5)	880 m	MPC · JPL
489722	2007 VP_{290}	—	November 14, 2007	Kitt Peak	Spacewatch	·	950 m	MPC · JPL
489723	2007 VS_{314}	—	November 2, 2007	Mount Lemmon	Mount Lemmon Survey	·	1.1 km	MPC · JPL
489724	2007 VU_{314}	—	November 2, 2007	Kitt Peak	Spacewatch	·	990 m	MPC · JPL
489725	2007 VH_{315}	—	November 5, 2007	Kitt Peak	Spacewatch	·	2.0 km	MPC · JPL
489726	2007 VT_{320}	—	September 15, 2007	Mount Lemmon	Mount Lemmon Survey	·	2.2 km	MPC · JPL
489727	2007 VB_{325}	—	November 1, 2007	Kitt Peak	Spacewatch	·	960 m	MPC · JPL
489728	2007 WT_{14}	—	October 30, 2007	Kitt Peak	Spacewatch	·	890 m	MPC · JPL
489729	2007 WS_{32}	—	November 19, 2007	Mount Lemmon	Mount Lemmon Survey	·	1.2 km	MPC · JPL
489730	2007 WM_{58}	—	November 17, 2007	Kitt Peak	Spacewatch	HOF	2.0 km	MPC · JPL
489731	2007 WP_{61}	—	November 19, 2007	Mount Lemmon	Mount Lemmon Survey	·	1.2 km	MPC · JPL
489732	2007 WX_{61}	—	December 16, 2007	Catalina	CSS	(2076)	860 m	MPC · JPL
489733	2007 WJ_{62}	—	November 18, 2007	Mount Lemmon	Mount Lemmon Survey	·	1.2 km	MPC · JPL
489734	2007 WB_{63}	—	November 19, 2007	Kitt Peak	Spacewatch	·	980 m	MPC · JPL
489735	2007 XH_{7}	—	November 6, 2007	Kitt Peak	Spacewatch	·	980 m	MPC · JPL
489736	2007 XB_{17}	—	November 7, 2007	Kitt Peak	Spacewatch	·	2.1 km	MPC · JPL
489737	2007 XG_{17}	—	December 4, 2007	Mount Lemmon	Mount Lemmon Survey	·	1.1 km	MPC · JPL
489738	2007 XJ_{18}	—	December 12, 2007	La Sagra	OAM	·	1.5 km	MPC · JPL
489739	2007 XE_{40}	—	December 19, 2007	Mount Lemmon	Mount Lemmon Survey	·	1.6 km	MPC · JPL
489740	2007 XB_{42}	—	November 2, 2007	Mount Lemmon	Mount Lemmon Survey	·	1.1 km	MPC · JPL
489741	2007 XO_{49}	—	December 15, 2007	Catalina	CSS	·	1.9 km	MPC · JPL
489742	2007 XJ_{51}	—	December 4, 2007	Kitt Peak	Spacewatch	·	1.1 km	MPC · JPL
489743	2007 XP_{58}	—	December 6, 2007	Mount Lemmon	Mount Lemmon Survey	·	1.5 km	MPC · JPL
489744	2007 XA_{59}	—	December 14, 2007	Mount Lemmon	Mount Lemmon Survey	·	1 km	MPC · JPL
489745	2007 YC_{1}	—	December 4, 2007	Kitt Peak	Spacewatch	ERI	1.6 km	MPC · JPL
489746	2007 YU_{5}	—	November 20, 2007	Mount Lemmon	Mount Lemmon Survey	·	2.5 km	MPC · JPL
489747	2007 YT_{22}	—	December 16, 2007	Mount Lemmon	Mount Lemmon Survey	·	1.5 km	MPC · JPL
489748	2007 YR_{33}	—	December 28, 2007	Kitt Peak	Spacewatch	·	1.7 km	MPC · JPL
489749	2007 YX_{42}	—	December 30, 2007	Eskridge	G. Hug	·	1.5 km	MPC · JPL
489750	2007 YG_{49}	—	December 20, 2007	Kitt Peak	Spacewatch	·	1.1 km	MPC · JPL
489751	2007 YK_{49}	—	December 20, 2007	Kitt Peak	Spacewatch	·	2.0 km	MPC · JPL
489752	2007 YK_{62}	—	September 19, 2006	Kitt Peak	Spacewatch	·	2.0 km	MPC · JPL
489753	2007 YQ_{66}	—	December 30, 2007	Mount Lemmon	Mount Lemmon Survey	·	880 m	MPC · JPL
489754	2007 YP_{67}	—	December 17, 2007	Mount Lemmon	Mount Lemmon Survey	·	1.5 km	MPC · JPL
489755	2007 YA_{71}	—	December 16, 2007	Socorro	LINEAR	·	6.8 km	MPC · JPL
489756	2008 AX_{3}	—	November 6, 2007	Mount Lemmon	Mount Lemmon Survey	ADE	1.8 km	MPC · JPL
489757	2008 AK_{16}	—	January 10, 2008	Mount Lemmon	Mount Lemmon Survey	·	3.0 km	MPC · JPL
489758	2008 AW_{26}	—	January 10, 2008	Kitt Peak	Spacewatch	·	1.0 km	MPC · JPL
489759	2008 AW_{35}	—	December 30, 2007	Kitt Peak	Spacewatch	·	1.2 km	MPC · JPL
489760	2008 AW_{38}	—	November 7, 2007	Mount Lemmon	Mount Lemmon Survey	·	2.6 km	MPC · JPL
489761	2008 AV_{43}	—	January 10, 2008	Kitt Peak	Spacewatch	·	1.3 km	MPC · JPL
489762	2008 AQ_{46}	—	January 11, 2008	Kitt Peak	Spacewatch	EOS	2.1 km	MPC · JPL
489763	2008 AG_{54}	—	January 11, 2008	Kitt Peak	Spacewatch	·	2.1 km	MPC · JPL
489764	2008 AY_{54}	—	October 24, 2003	Kitt Peak	Spacewatch	MAS	570 m	MPC · JPL
489765	2008 AU_{59}	—	December 31, 2007	Kitt Peak	Spacewatch	THM	2.0 km	MPC · JPL
489766	2008 AL_{66}	—	January 11, 2008	Kitt Peak	Spacewatch	EUN	1.5 km	MPC · JPL
489767	2008 AZ_{71}	—	January 10, 2008	Catalina	CSS	·	1.4 km	MPC · JPL
489768	2008 AQ_{90}	—	January 13, 2008	Kitt Peak	Spacewatch	(5)	1.5 km	MPC · JPL
489769	2008 AS_{91}	—	November 8, 2007	Mount Lemmon	Mount Lemmon Survey	·	1.3 km	MPC · JPL
489770	2008 AY_{97}	—	December 31, 2007	Mount Lemmon	Mount Lemmon Survey	·	1.0 km	MPC · JPL
489771	2008 AV_{107}	—	January 15, 2008	Kitt Peak	Spacewatch	·	1.0 km	MPC · JPL
489772	2008 AK_{108}	—	January 15, 2008	Mount Lemmon	Mount Lemmon Survey	·	1.4 km	MPC · JPL
489773	2008 AB_{109}	—	January 15, 2008	Kitt Peak	Spacewatch	·	2.5 km	MPC · JPL
489774	2008 AG_{138}	—	January 15, 2008	Mount Lemmon	Mount Lemmon Survey	·	1.3 km	MPC · JPL
489775	2008 BU_{1}	—	January 16, 2008	Kitt Peak	Spacewatch	·	1.5 km	MPC · JPL
489776	2008 BV_{7}	—	December 19, 2007	Mount Lemmon	Mount Lemmon Survey	ADE	1.4 km	MPC · JPL
489777	2008 BW_{51}	—	January 18, 2008	Kitt Peak	Spacewatch	·	980 m	MPC · JPL
489778	2008 CD_{7}	—	December 31, 2007	Mount Lemmon	Mount Lemmon Survey	·	1.2 km	MPC · JPL
489779	2008 CL_{7}	—	February 2, 2008	Kitt Peak	Spacewatch	·	1.4 km	MPC · JPL
489780	2008 CC_{30}	—	February 2, 2008	Kitt Peak	Spacewatch	·	1.5 km	MPC · JPL
489781	2008 CH_{34}	—	February 2, 2008	Kitt Peak	Spacewatch	·	1.7 km	MPC · JPL
489782	2008 CD_{40}	—	January 15, 2008	Mount Lemmon	Mount Lemmon Survey	·	1.2 km	MPC · JPL
489783	2008 CH_{40}	—	February 2, 2008	Mount Lemmon	Mount Lemmon Survey	·	1.2 km	MPC · JPL
489784	2008 CJ_{43}	—	February 2, 2008	Kitt Peak	Spacewatch	NYS	950 m	MPC · JPL
489785	2008 CP_{43}	—	February 2, 2008	Kitt Peak	Spacewatch	·	1.1 km	MPC · JPL
489786	2008 CR_{62}	—	December 19, 2007	Mount Lemmon	Mount Lemmon Survey	·	1.8 km	MPC · JPL
489787	2008 CT_{81}	—	December 5, 2007	Mount Lemmon	Mount Lemmon Survey	·	1.4 km	MPC · JPL
489788	2008 CX_{84}	—	February 7, 2008	Kitt Peak	Spacewatch	·	1.3 km	MPC · JPL
489789	2008 CF_{94}	—	February 8, 2008	Mount Lemmon	Mount Lemmon Survey	·	1.7 km	MPC · JPL
489790	2008 CX_{99}	—	February 9, 2008	Kitt Peak	Spacewatch	·	2.0 km	MPC · JPL
489791	2008 CT_{112}	—	February 10, 2008	Kitt Peak	Spacewatch	·	1.4 km	MPC · JPL
489792	2008 CV_{141}	—	February 8, 2008	Kitt Peak	Spacewatch	·	1.4 km	MPC · JPL
489793	2008 CK_{143}	—	January 30, 2008	Mount Lemmon	Mount Lemmon Survey	·	1.8 km	MPC · JPL
489794	2008 CY_{144}	—	February 9, 2008	Kitt Peak	Spacewatch	·	1.3 km	MPC · JPL
489795	2008 CP_{146}	—	February 9, 2008	Kitt Peak	Spacewatch	·	1.0 km	MPC · JPL
489796	2008 CF_{148}	—	February 8, 2008	Mount Lemmon	Mount Lemmon Survey	·	1.4 km	MPC · JPL
489797	2008 CZ_{154}	—	January 10, 2008	Mount Lemmon	Mount Lemmon Survey	MAR	1.0 km	MPC · JPL
489798	2008 CZ_{155}	—	February 9, 2008	Catalina	CSS	·	1.5 km	MPC · JPL
489799	2008 CK_{156}	—	February 9, 2008	Kitt Peak	Spacewatch	·	1.3 km	MPC · JPL
489800	2008 CQ_{159}	—	January 13, 2008	Kitt Peak	Spacewatch	·	1.5 km	MPC · JPL

== 489801–489900 ==
back to top

Designation			Discovery			Properties		Ref
Permanent	Provisional	Named after	Date	Site	Discoverer(s)	Category	Diam.	Ref
489801	2008 CW_{169}	—	February 12, 2008	Mount Lemmon	Mount Lemmon Survey	·	1.7 km	MPC · JPL
489802	2008 CS_{181}	—	February 2, 2008	Kitt Peak	Spacewatch	·	490 m	MPC · JPL
489803	2008 CB_{182}	—	February 11, 2008	Mount Lemmon	Mount Lemmon Survey	·	1.9 km	MPC · JPL
489804	2008 CB_{186}	—	January 17, 2008	Mount Lemmon	Mount Lemmon Survey	·	1.6 km	MPC · JPL
489805	2008 CS_{191}	—	February 2, 2008	Kitt Peak	Spacewatch	CYB	3.1 km	MPC · JPL
489806	2008 CG_{193}	—	February 11, 2008	Mount Lemmon	Mount Lemmon Survey	·	1.6 km	MPC · JPL
489807	2008 CN_{197}	—	February 9, 2008	Kitt Peak	Spacewatch	·	1.4 km	MPC · JPL
489808	2008 CE_{209}	—	February 7, 2008	Mount Lemmon	Mount Lemmon Survey	·	1.3 km	MPC · JPL
489809	2008 CK_{209}	—	February 2, 2008	Catalina	CSS	·	1.4 km	MPC · JPL
489810	2008 DF_{12}	—	January 16, 2008	Kitt Peak	Spacewatch	·	1.3 km	MPC · JPL
489811	2008 DM_{12}	—	February 26, 2008	Kitt Peak	Spacewatch	·	980 m	MPC · JPL
489812	2008 DY_{27}	—	January 30, 2008	Mount Lemmon	Mount Lemmon Survey	(5)	1.1 km	MPC · JPL
489813	2008 DE_{29}	—	January 19, 2008	Kitt Peak	Spacewatch	MAS	590 m	MPC · JPL
489814	2008 DS_{82}	—	February 28, 2008	Kitt Peak	Spacewatch	·	1.6 km	MPC · JPL
489815	2008 DK_{85}	—	February 27, 2008	Mount Lemmon	Mount Lemmon Survey	·	1.5 km	MPC · JPL
489816	2008 DQ_{85}	—	February 28, 2008	Kitt Peak	Spacewatch	·	700 m	MPC · JPL
489817	2008 DM_{86}	—	February 28, 2008	Mount Lemmon	Mount Lemmon Survey	·	1.6 km	MPC · JPL
489818	2008 EB_{2}	—	March 1, 2008	Kitt Peak	Spacewatch	·	1.4 km	MPC · JPL
489819	2008 EC_{5}	—	March 1, 2008	Kanab	Sheridan, E.	·	1.3 km	MPC · JPL
489820	2008 EX_{17}	—	March 1, 2008	Kitt Peak	Spacewatch	JUN	770 m	MPC · JPL
489821	2008 EN_{33}	—	March 1, 2008	Kitt Peak	Spacewatch	·	1.6 km	MPC · JPL
489822	2008 EO_{33}	—	January 30, 2008	Mount Lemmon	Mount Lemmon Survey	·	2.0 km	MPC · JPL
489823	2008 EJ_{38}	—	March 4, 2008	Kitt Peak	Spacewatch	·	1.6 km	MPC · JPL
489824	2008 EV_{40}	—	March 4, 2008	Kitt Peak	Spacewatch	·	600 m	MPC · JPL
489825	2008 ER_{50}	—	March 6, 2008	Mount Lemmon	Mount Lemmon Survey	·	1.5 km	MPC · JPL
489826	2008 EP_{52}	—	March 6, 2008	Kitt Peak	Spacewatch	·	1.6 km	MPC · JPL
489827	2008 ES_{68}	—	March 10, 2008	Mount Lemmon	Mount Lemmon Survey	L5	8.8 km	MPC · JPL
489828	2008 EV_{73}	—	February 28, 2008	Kitt Peak	Spacewatch	·	1.3 km	MPC · JPL
489829	2008 EH_{79}	—	February 14, 2008	Catalina	CSS	·	1.5 km	MPC · JPL
489830	2008 EK_{82}	—	February 10, 2008	Kitt Peak	Spacewatch	JUN	1.1 km	MPC · JPL
489831	2008 EM_{84}	—	March 5, 2008	Mount Lemmon	Mount Lemmon Survey	·	1.4 km	MPC · JPL
489832	2008 ET_{88}	—	February 7, 2008	Mount Lemmon	Mount Lemmon Survey	·	1.9 km	MPC · JPL
489833	2008 ED_{92}	—	February 6, 2008	XuYi	PMO NEO Survey Program	·	1.8 km	MPC · JPL
489834	2008 ER_{94}	—	February 9, 2008	Kitt Peak	Spacewatch	CYB	3.0 km	MPC · JPL
489835	2008 EJ_{107}	—	March 6, 2008	Mount Lemmon	Mount Lemmon Survey	·	1.6 km	MPC · JPL
489836	2008 EA_{119}	—	January 19, 2008	Mount Lemmon	Mount Lemmon Survey	·	1.6 km	MPC · JPL
489837	2008 EY_{126}	—	March 10, 2008	Kitt Peak	Spacewatch	JUN	1.1 km	MPC · JPL
489838	2008 EJ_{143}	—	March 3, 2008	XuYi	PMO NEO Survey Program	·	1.4 km	MPC · JPL
489839	2008 ES_{156}	—	March 10, 2008	Kitt Peak	Spacewatch	·	1.3 km	MPC · JPL
489840	2008 ES_{160}	—	March 1, 2008	Kitt Peak	Spacewatch	·	1.6 km	MPC · JPL
489841	2008 EX_{167}	—	March 10, 2008	Kitt Peak	Spacewatch	JUN	750 m	MPC · JPL
489842	2008 FB_{10}	—	February 2, 2008	Kitt Peak	Spacewatch	·	1.7 km	MPC · JPL
489843	2008 FD_{14}	—	March 26, 2008	Mount Lemmon	Mount Lemmon Survey	·	1.3 km	MPC · JPL
489844	2008 FQ_{27}	—	March 5, 2008	Mount Lemmon	Mount Lemmon Survey	HOF	1.9 km	MPC · JPL
489845	2008 FC_{37}	—	March 28, 2008	Mount Lemmon	Mount Lemmon Survey	·	1.3 km	MPC · JPL
489846	2008 FW_{40}	—	March 10, 2008	Kitt Peak	Spacewatch	·	1.4 km	MPC · JPL
489847	2008 FL_{48}	—	March 1, 2008	Kitt Peak	Spacewatch	·	1.7 km	MPC · JPL
489848	2008 FX_{53}	—	March 13, 2008	Kitt Peak	Spacewatch	·	1.4 km	MPC · JPL
489849	2008 FZ_{70}	—	February 12, 2008	Mount Lemmon	Mount Lemmon Survey	GEF	950 m	MPC · JPL
489850	2008 FK_{73}	—	March 30, 2008	Kitt Peak	Spacewatch	·	1.2 km	MPC · JPL
489851	2008 FV_{78}	—	March 15, 2008	Mount Lemmon	Mount Lemmon Survey	·	1.7 km	MPC · JPL
489852	2008 FS_{80}	—	March 4, 2008	Kitt Peak	Spacewatch	·	3.4 km	MPC · JPL
489853	2008 FJ_{98}	—	March 5, 2008	Mount Lemmon	Mount Lemmon Survey	NEM	1.8 km	MPC · JPL
489854	2008 FO_{103}	—	March 30, 2008	Kitt Peak	Spacewatch	·	1.8 km	MPC · JPL
489855	2008 FP_{112}	—	March 31, 2008	Kitt Peak	Spacewatch	·	1.4 km	MPC · JPL
489856	2008 FX_{115}	—	March 31, 2008	Mount Lemmon	Mount Lemmon Survey	HOF	2.1 km	MPC · JPL
489857	2008 FA_{122}	—	March 31, 2008	Mount Lemmon	Mount Lemmon Survey	WIT	1.0 km	MPC · JPL
489858	2008 FA_{128}	—	March 28, 2008	Kitt Peak	Spacewatch	·	1.8 km	MPC · JPL
489859	2008 FU_{133}	—	March 28, 2008	Mount Lemmon	Mount Lemmon Survey	AGN	900 m	MPC · JPL
489860	2008 GG_{1}	—	March 5, 2008	Kitt Peak	Spacewatch	·	1.9 km	MPC · JPL
489861	2008 GK_{6}	—	March 5, 2008	Mount Lemmon	Mount Lemmon Survey	·	1.7 km	MPC · JPL
489862	2008 GJ_{8}	—	March 4, 2008	Mount Lemmon	Mount Lemmon Survey	·	2.6 km	MPC · JPL
489863	2008 GU_{28}	—	March 31, 2008	Kitt Peak	Spacewatch	·	1.4 km	MPC · JPL
489864	2008 GN_{32}	—	April 3, 2008	Kitt Peak	Spacewatch	·	1.6 km	MPC · JPL
489865	2008 GS_{33}	—	December 14, 2006	Mount Lemmon	Mount Lemmon Survey	·	1.2 km	MPC · JPL
489866	2008 GJ_{51}	—	March 28, 2008	Mount Lemmon	Mount Lemmon Survey	·	1.5 km	MPC · JPL
489867	2008 GB_{54}	—	April 5, 2008	Mount Lemmon	Mount Lemmon Survey	·	1.4 km	MPC · JPL
489868	2008 GP_{67}	—	April 6, 2008	Kitt Peak	Spacewatch	·	1.5 km	MPC · JPL
489869	2008 GM_{68}	—	April 6, 2008	Kitt Peak	Spacewatch	·	1.2 km	MPC · JPL
489870	2008 GU_{74}	—	April 7, 2008	Kitt Peak	Spacewatch	MRX	970 m	MPC · JPL
489871	2008 GJ_{76}	—	April 5, 2008	Mount Lemmon	Mount Lemmon Survey	EUN	1.1 km	MPC · JPL
489872	2008 GC_{78}	—	April 7, 2008	Kitt Peak	Spacewatch	·	1.7 km	MPC · JPL
489873	2008 GK_{78}	—	March 30, 2008	Kitt Peak	Spacewatch	(5)	1.4 km	MPC · JPL
489874	2008 GT_{105}	—	April 11, 2008	Kitt Peak	Spacewatch	·	2.3 km	MPC · JPL
489875	2008 GM_{106}	—	February 12, 2008	Mount Lemmon	Mount Lemmon Survey	·	1.9 km	MPC · JPL
489876	2008 GY_{106}	—	April 12, 2008	Catalina	CSS	·	2.1 km	MPC · JPL
489877	2008 GJ_{131}	—	April 10, 2008	Kitt Peak	Spacewatch	·	1.7 km	MPC · JPL
489878	2008 GV_{138}	—	April 6, 2008	Kitt Peak	Spacewatch	MRX	860 m	MPC · JPL
489879	2008 GA_{139}	—	April 1, 2008	Kitt Peak	Spacewatch	L5	8.2 km	MPC · JPL
489880	2008 GF_{144}	—	April 3, 2008	Kitt Peak	Spacewatch	GEF	1.1 km	MPC · JPL
489881	2008 HQ_{1}	—	April 24, 2008	Kitt Peak	Spacewatch	·	2.0 km	MPC · JPL
489882	2008 HM_{6}	—	April 24, 2008	Kitt Peak	Spacewatch	·	1.6 km	MPC · JPL
489883	2008 HP_{8}	—	April 3, 2008	Mount Lemmon	Mount Lemmon Survey	·	1.7 km	MPC · JPL
489884	2008 HR_{19}	—	April 26, 2008	Kitt Peak	Spacewatch	·	2.1 km	MPC · JPL
489885	2008 HY_{37}	—	April 29, 2008	Kitt Peak	Spacewatch	AMO	640 m	MPC · JPL
489886	2008 HN_{41}	—	April 8, 2008	Kitt Peak	Spacewatch	·	590 m	MPC · JPL
489887	2008 HT_{46}	—	March 6, 2008	Mount Lemmon	Mount Lemmon Survey	·	1.9 km	MPC · JPL
489888	2008 HZ_{55}	—	April 29, 2008	Kitt Peak	Spacewatch	·	1.6 km	MPC · JPL
489889	2008 HT_{56}	—	April 30, 2008	Kitt Peak	Spacewatch	·	1.7 km	MPC · JPL
489890	2008 HU_{62}	—	March 11, 2008	Catalina	CSS	·	2.0 km	MPC · JPL
489891	2008 HV_{68}	—	April 29, 2008	Kitt Peak	Spacewatch	·	1.5 km	MPC · JPL
489892	2008 HL_{69}	—	April 1, 2008	Kitt Peak	Spacewatch	AEO	1.1 km	MPC · JPL
489893	2008 JM_{12}	—	May 3, 2008	Kitt Peak	Spacewatch	·	1.8 km	MPC · JPL
489894	2008 JG_{18}	—	April 15, 2008	Mount Lemmon	Mount Lemmon Survey	·	2.3 km	MPC · JPL
489895	2008 JS_{21}	—	May 5, 2008	Mount Lemmon	Mount Lemmon Survey	JUN	1.0 km	MPC · JPL
489896	2008 JN_{23}	—	April 15, 2008	Kitt Peak	Spacewatch	·	1.6 km	MPC · JPL
489897	2008 JW_{25}	—	April 26, 2008	Kitt Peak	Spacewatch	·	1.8 km	MPC · JPL
489898	2008 JJ_{28}	—	May 8, 2008	Kitt Peak	Spacewatch	·	1.8 km	MPC · JPL
489899	2008 JT_{40}	—	May 15, 2008	Mount Lemmon	Mount Lemmon Survey	BRA	1.2 km	MPC · JPL
489900	2008 KP	—	May 27, 2008	Mount Lemmon	Mount Lemmon Survey	APO	600 m	MPC · JPL

== 489901–490000 ==
back to top

Designation			Discovery			Properties		Ref
Permanent	Provisional	Named after	Date	Site	Discoverer(s)	Category	Diam.	Ref
489901	2008 KA_{17}	—	April 30, 2008	Mount Lemmon	Mount Lemmon Survey	·	1.4 km	MPC · JPL
489902	2008 KA_{27}	—	May 30, 2008	Kitt Peak	Spacewatch	EUN	1.2 km	MPC · JPL
489903	2008 KL_{30}	—	May 29, 2008	Kitt Peak	Spacewatch	·	2.1 km	MPC · JPL
489904	2008 KM_{31}	—	May 29, 2008	Kitt Peak	Spacewatch	·	2.2 km	MPC · JPL
489905	2008 KX_{38}	—	May 30, 2008	Kitt Peak	Spacewatch	PHO	1.2 km	MPC · JPL
489906	2008 LU_{5}	—	April 16, 2008	Mount Lemmon	Mount Lemmon Survey	·	2.0 km	MPC · JPL
489907	2008 OW_{7}	—	July 30, 2008	Mount Lemmon	Mount Lemmon Survey	·	1.6 km	MPC · JPL
489908	2008 OP_{14}	—	July 29, 2008	Mount Lemmon	Mount Lemmon Survey	·	3.3 km	MPC · JPL
489909	2008 OF_{20}	—	July 30, 2008	Kitt Peak	Spacewatch	·	910 m	MPC · JPL
489910	2008 OP_{20}	—	July 29, 2008	Kitt Peak	Spacewatch	·	570 m	MPC · JPL
489911	2008 OQ_{21}	—	July 30, 2008	Kitt Peak	Spacewatch	·	510 m	MPC · JPL
489912	2008 OY_{23}	—	May 29, 2008	Mount Lemmon	Mount Lemmon Survey	(32418)	2.3 km	MPC · JPL
489913	2008 PG_{5}	—	August 5, 2008	La Sagra	OAM	·	970 m	MPC · JPL
489914	2008 PU_{8}	—	August 6, 2008	La Sagra	OAM	·	1.2 km	MPC · JPL
489915	2008 PF_{15}	—	July 1, 2008	Kitt Peak	Spacewatch	NYS	940 m	MPC · JPL
489916	2008 QF_{8}	—	August 2, 2008	La Sagra	OAM	·	590 m	MPC · JPL
489917	2008 QH_{11}	—	August 26, 2008	La Sagra	OAM	·	4.2 km	MPC · JPL
489918	2008 QO_{12}	—	August 26, 2008	La Sagra	OAM	·	670 m	MPC · JPL
489919	2008 QC_{21}	—	August 26, 2008	Socorro	LINEAR	T_{j} (2.97)	3.1 km	MPC · JPL
489920	2008 QG_{22}	—	August 26, 2008	Socorro	LINEAR	·	3.5 km	MPC · JPL
489921	2008 QD_{23}	—	August 26, 2008	Socorro	LINEAR	·	1.7 km	MPC · JPL
489922	2008 QB_{35}	—	August 29, 2008	La Sagra	OAM	·	590 m	MPC · JPL
489923	2008 QM_{38}	—	September 5, 2008	Kitt Peak	Spacewatch	·	3.2 km	MPC · JPL
489924	2008 QX_{40}	—	August 26, 2008	La Sagra	OAM	·	1.7 km	MPC · JPL
489925	2008 QL_{46}	—	August 24, 2008	Kitt Peak	Spacewatch	·	1.2 km	MPC · JPL
489926	2008 RF_{4}	—	September 2, 2008	Kitt Peak	Spacewatch	·	560 m	MPC · JPL
489927	2008 RV_{4}	—	September 2, 2008	Kitt Peak	Spacewatch	·	2.6 km	MPC · JPL
489928	2008 RM_{17}	—	September 4, 2008	Kitt Peak	Spacewatch	·	1.1 km	MPC · JPL
489929	2008 RQ_{17}	—	August 24, 2008	Kitt Peak	Spacewatch	·	600 m	MPC · JPL
489930	2008 RP_{24}	—	September 5, 2008	La Sagra	OAM	·	1.1 km	MPC · JPL
489931	2008 RJ_{30}	—	September 2, 2008	Kitt Peak	Spacewatch	·	570 m	MPC · JPL
489932	2008 RG_{44}	—	September 2, 2008	Kitt Peak	Spacewatch	·	750 m	MPC · JPL
489933	2008 RY_{45}	—	September 2, 2008	Kitt Peak	Spacewatch	MAS	600 m	MPC · JPL
489934	2008 RG_{46}	—	September 2, 2008	Kitt Peak	Spacewatch	L4	7.1 km	MPC · JPL
489935	2008 RQ_{65}	—	September 4, 2008	Kitt Peak	Spacewatch	·	2.6 km	MPC · JPL
489936	2008 RU_{85}	—	September 5, 2008	Kitt Peak	Spacewatch	(5)	860 m	MPC · JPL
489937	2008 RY_{87}	—	September 5, 2008	Kitt Peak	Spacewatch	·	1.4 km	MPC · JPL
489938	2008 RH_{89}	—	September 5, 2008	Kitt Peak	Spacewatch	EOS	1.7 km	MPC · JPL
489939	2008 RV_{90}	—	July 29, 2008	Kitt Peak	Spacewatch	MAS	540 m	MPC · JPL
489940	2008 RB_{91}	—	August 7, 2008	Kitt Peak	Spacewatch	·	850 m	MPC · JPL
489941	2008 RO_{91}	—	September 2, 2008	Kitt Peak	Spacewatch	L4	8.1 km	MPC · JPL
489942	2008 RY_{102}	—	September 4, 2008	Kitt Peak	Spacewatch	·	2.2 km	MPC · JPL
489943	2008 RP_{103}	—	September 5, 2008	Kitt Peak	Spacewatch	L4	8.5 km	MPC · JPL
489944	2008 RT_{103}	—	September 5, 2008	Kitt Peak	Spacewatch	(2076)	810 m	MPC · JPL
489945	2008 RY_{109}	—	September 3, 2008	Kitt Peak	Spacewatch	·	2.5 km	MPC · JPL
489946	2008 RC_{112}	—	September 4, 2008	Kitt Peak	Spacewatch	·	650 m	MPC · JPL
489947	2008 RL_{112}	—	September 4, 2008	Kitt Peak	Spacewatch	·	1.2 km	MPC · JPL
489948	2008 RO_{112}	—	September 5, 2008	Kitt Peak	Spacewatch	·	1.7 km	MPC · JPL
489949	2008 RS_{112}	—	September 5, 2008	Kitt Peak	Spacewatch	L4 · ERY	6.7 km	MPC · JPL
489950	2008 RD_{114}	—	September 6, 2008	Mount Lemmon	Mount Lemmon Survey	·	2.3 km	MPC · JPL
489951	2008 RJ_{121}	—	September 2, 2008	Kitt Peak	Spacewatch	L4	6.2 km	MPC · JPL
489952	2008 RA_{123}	—	September 5, 2008	Kitt Peak	Spacewatch	L4	7.6 km	MPC · JPL
489953	2008 RH_{127}	—	September 6, 2008	Kitt Peak	Spacewatch	·	2.7 km	MPC · JPL
489954	2008 RR_{127}	—	September 6, 2008	Mount Lemmon	Mount Lemmon Survey	·	1.5 km	MPC · JPL
489955	2008 RJ_{135}	—	September 2, 2008	Kitt Peak	Spacewatch	·	1 km	MPC · JPL
489956	2008 RC_{137}	—	September 5, 2008	La Sagra	OAM	·	1.5 km	MPC · JPL
489957	2008 RK_{137}	—	September 5, 2008	Socorro	LINEAR	·	480 m	MPC · JPL
489958	2008 RX_{139}	—	September 7, 2008	Mount Lemmon	Mount Lemmon Survey	·	740 m	MPC · JPL
489959	2008 SN_{6}	—	September 22, 2008	Socorro	LINEAR	ADE	1.9 km	MPC · JPL
489960	2008 SG_{8}	—	August 24, 2008	La Sagra	OAM	·	3.0 km	MPC · JPL
489961	2008 SN_{27}	—	September 19, 2008	Kitt Peak	Spacewatch	·	1.0 km	MPC · JPL
489962	2008 SE_{37}	—	September 20, 2008	Kitt Peak	Spacewatch	·	2.7 km	MPC · JPL
489963	2008 SS_{40}	—	September 20, 2008	Kitt Peak	Spacewatch	·	740 m	MPC · JPL
489964	2008 SC_{41}	—	September 6, 2008	Catalina	CSS	·	2.8 km	MPC · JPL
489965	2008 SA_{43}	—	September 20, 2008	Kitt Peak	Spacewatch	·	960 m	MPC · JPL
489966	2008 SA_{45}	—	September 6, 2008	Mount Lemmon	Mount Lemmon Survey	·	620 m	MPC · JPL
489967	2008 SA_{46}	—	September 20, 2008	Kitt Peak	Spacewatch	·	3.3 km	MPC · JPL
489968	2008 SC_{54}	—	September 20, 2008	Mount Lemmon	Mount Lemmon Survey	·	670 m	MPC · JPL
489969	2008 SE_{54}	—	September 20, 2008	Mount Lemmon	Mount Lemmon Survey	(17392)	1.2 km	MPC · JPL
489970	2008 SR_{56}	—	September 20, 2008	Mount Lemmon	Mount Lemmon Survey	·	2.1 km	MPC · JPL
489971	2008 SN_{62}	—	September 5, 2008	Kitt Peak	Spacewatch	·	1.9 km	MPC · JPL
489972	2008 SU_{62}	—	September 21, 2008	Kitt Peak	Spacewatch	(5)	1.2 km	MPC · JPL
489973	2008 SJ_{77}	—	August 24, 2008	Kitt Peak	Spacewatch	·	2.8 km	MPC · JPL
489974	2008 SG_{88}	—	September 20, 2008	Kitt Peak	Spacewatch	·	1.4 km	MPC · JPL
489975	2008 SF_{93}	—	September 21, 2008	Kitt Peak	Spacewatch	H	430 m	MPC · JPL
489976	2008 SX_{93}	—	September 21, 2008	Kitt Peak	Spacewatch	·	1.2 km	MPC · JPL
489977	2008 SC_{104}	—	September 21, 2008	Kitt Peak	Spacewatch	·	900 m	MPC · JPL
489978	2008 SL_{105}	—	September 7, 2008	Mount Lemmon	Mount Lemmon Survey	·	1.2 km	MPC · JPL
489979	2008 SC_{112}	—	September 22, 2008	Kitt Peak	Spacewatch	·	2.1 km	MPC · JPL
489980	2008 SA_{117}	—	September 22, 2008	Mount Lemmon	Mount Lemmon Survey	·	2.3 km	MPC · JPL
489981	2008 SE_{118}	—	September 22, 2008	Mount Lemmon	Mount Lemmon Survey	·	870 m	MPC · JPL
489982	2008 SA_{119}	—	September 22, 2008	Mount Lemmon	Mount Lemmon Survey	·	2.0 km	MPC · JPL
489983	2008 SN_{120}	—	September 6, 2008	Mount Lemmon	Mount Lemmon Survey	·	1.5 km	MPC · JPL
489984	2008 SL_{125}	—	September 22, 2008	Mount Lemmon	Mount Lemmon Survey	·	2.6 km	MPC · JPL
489985	2008 ST_{127}	—	September 22, 2008	Kitt Peak	Spacewatch	·	1.4 km	MPC · JPL
489986	2008 SN_{142}	—	September 24, 2008	Mount Lemmon	Mount Lemmon Survey	·	810 m	MPC · JPL
489987	2008 SN_{145}	—	September 21, 2008	Kitt Peak	Spacewatch	·	490 m	MPC · JPL
489988	2008 SP_{151}	—	September 29, 2008	Kachina	Hobart, J.	·	720 m	MPC · JPL
489989	2008 SX_{152}	—	September 3, 2008	Kitt Peak	Spacewatch	·	2.9 km	MPC · JPL
489990	2008 SA_{156}	—	September 23, 2008	Socorro	LINEAR	T_{j} (2.93)	3.4 km	MPC · JPL
489991	2008 SJ_{161}	—	September 29, 2008	Mount Lemmon	Mount Lemmon Survey	·	3.2 km	MPC · JPL
489992	2008 SQ_{164}	—	September 22, 2008	Kitt Peak	Spacewatch	·	730 m	MPC · JPL
489993	2008 SD_{168}	—	July 30, 2008	Kitt Peak	Spacewatch	·	3.4 km	MPC · JPL
489994	2008 SV_{176}	—	September 23, 2008	Catalina	CSS	·	1.7 km	MPC · JPL
489995	2008 SN_{184}	—	September 24, 2008	Mount Lemmon	Mount Lemmon Survey	·	1.1 km	MPC · JPL
489996	2008 ST_{186}	—	September 25, 2008	Kitt Peak	Spacewatch	VER	2.2 km	MPC · JPL
489997	2008 SR_{191}	—	September 25, 2008	Kitt Peak	Spacewatch	·	650 m	MPC · JPL
489998	2008 SH_{194}	—	September 25, 2008	Kitt Peak	Spacewatch	·	2.6 km	MPC · JPL
489999	2008 ST_{199}	—	September 26, 2008	Kitt Peak	Spacewatch	·	2.6 km	MPC · JPL
490000	2008 SG_{201}	—	September 26, 2008	Kitt Peak	Spacewatch	·	460 m	MPC · JPL

back to top

== Meaning of names ==
As minor planet discoveries are confirmed, they are given a permanent number by the IAU's Minor Planet Center (MPC), and the discoverers can then submit names for them, following the IAU's naming conventions. The list below concerns those minor planets in the specified number-range that have received names, and explains the meanings of those names.

Official naming citations of newly named small Solar System bodies are approved and published in a bulletin by IAU's Working Group for Small Bodies Nomenclature (WGSBN). Before May 2021, citations were published in MPC's Minor Planet Circulars for many decades. Recent citations can also be found on the JPL Small-Body Database (SBDB). Until his death in 2016, German astronomer Lutz D. Schmadel compiled these citations into the Dictionary of Minor Planet Names (DMP) and regularly updated the collection.

Based on Paul Herget's The Names of the Minor Planets, Schmadel also researched the unclear origin of numerous asteroids, most of which had been named prior to World War II. This article incorporates text from this source, which is in the public domain: SBDB New namings may only be added to this list below after official publication as the preannouncement of names is condemned. The WGSBN publishes a comprehensive guideline for the naming rules of non-cometary small Solar System bodies.

Named minor planet	Provisional	This minor planet was named for...	Ref · Catalog
489603 Kurtschreckling	2007 TU_{184}	Kurt Schreckling (born 1939) is a German technician and amateur astronomer. His specialty is the optical measurement technique and the imparting of this knowledge to other amateur astronomers.	JPL · 489603
