= List of minor planets: 187001–188000 =

The following is a partial list of minor planets, running from minor-planet number 187001 through 188000, inclusive. The primary data for this and other partial lists is based on JPL's "Small-Body Orbital Elements" and data available from the Minor Planet Center. Critical list information is also provided by the MPC, unless otherwise specified from Lowell Observatory. A detailed description of the table's columns and additional sources are given on the main page including a complete list of every page in this series, and a statistical break-up on the dynamical classification of minor planets.

Also see the summary list of all named bodies in numerical and alphabetical order, and the corresponding naming citations for the number range of this particular list. New namings may only be added to this list after official publication, as the preannouncement of names is condemned by the Working Group for Small Bodies Nomenclature of the International Astronomical Union.

Near-Earth obj.	MBA (inner)	MBA (outer)	Centaur
Mars-crosser	MBA (middle)	Jupiter trojan	Trans-Neptunian obj.
Unclassified

== 187001–187100 ==
Designation			Discovery			Properties		Ref
Permanent	Provisional	Named after	Date	Site	Discoverer(s)	Category	Diam.	Ref
187001	2004 TB_{107}	—	October 7, 2004	Socorro	LINEAR	·	4.8 km	MPC · JPL
187002	2004 TO_{110}	—	October 7, 2004	Socorro	LINEAR	H	790 m	MPC · JPL
187003	2004 TY_{120}	—	October 6, 2004	Palomar	NEAT	3:2	9.4 km	MPC · JPL
187004	2004 TV_{121}	—	October 7, 2004	Anderson Mesa	LONEOS	·	4.5 km	MPC · JPL
187005	2004 TC_{127}	—	October 7, 2004	Socorro	LINEAR	·	3.1 km	MPC · JPL
187006	2004 TK_{127}	—	October 7, 2004	Socorro	LINEAR	·	4.7 km	MPC · JPL
187007	2004 TG_{128}	—	October 7, 2004	Socorro	LINEAR	·	3.5 km	MPC · JPL
187008	2004 TM_{129}	—	October 7, 2004	Socorro	LINEAR	·	6.9 km	MPC · JPL
187009	2004 TG_{137}	—	October 8, 2004	Anderson Mesa	LONEOS	·	3.5 km	MPC · JPL
187010	2004 TB_{170}	—	October 7, 2004	Socorro	LINEAR	·	4.6 km	MPC · JPL
187011	2004 TT_{224}	—	October 8, 2004	Kitt Peak	Spacewatch	3:2 · SHU	5.5 km	MPC · JPL
187012	2004 TW_{232}	—	October 8, 2004	Kitt Peak	Spacewatch	3:2	6.2 km	MPC · JPL
187013	2004 TO_{282}	—	October 7, 2004	Socorro	LINEAR	THM	3.3 km	MPC · JPL
187014	2004 TA_{297}	—	October 10, 2004	Kitt Peak	Spacewatch	·	4.8 km	MPC · JPL
187015	2004 UM_{2}	—	October 18, 2004	Socorro	LINEAR	·	5.0 km	MPC · JPL
187016	2004 UT_{2}	—	October 18, 2004	Socorro	LINEAR	·	5.9 km	MPC · JPL
187017	2004 VO_{7}	—	November 3, 2004	Kitt Peak	Spacewatch	3:2	9.0 km	MPC · JPL
187018	2004 YC_{25}	—	December 18, 2004	Mount Lemmon	Mount Lemmon Survey	L5	10 km	MPC · JPL
187019	2004 YU_{36}	—	December 20, 2004	Mount Lemmon	Mount Lemmon Survey	L5	10 km	MPC · JPL
187020	2005 AZ_{63}	—	January 13, 2005	Kitt Peak	Spacewatch	L5	10 km	MPC · JPL
187021	2005 AU_{66}	—	January 13, 2005	Kitt Peak	Spacewatch	L5	13 km	MPC · JPL
187022	2005 BJ_{1}	—	January 16, 2005	Socorro	LINEAR	H	1.2 km	MPC · JPL
187023	2005 BQ_{2}	—	January 16, 2005	Socorro	LINEAR	H	990 m	MPC · JPL
187024	2005 BN_{13}	—	January 17, 2005	Kitt Peak	Spacewatch	L5	10 km	MPC · JPL
187025	2005 DB_{2}	—	February 28, 2005	Socorro	LINEAR	H	920 m	MPC · JPL
187026	2005 EK_{70}	—	March 8, 2005	Socorro	LINEAR	ATE +1km	1.2 km	MPC · JPL
187027	2005 EZ_{119}	—	March 8, 2005	Anderson Mesa	LONEOS	·	1.2 km	MPC · JPL
187028	2005 EY_{150}	—	March 10, 2005	Kitt Peak	Spacewatch	·	1.1 km	MPC · JPL
187029	2005 EH_{161}	—	March 9, 2005	Mount Lemmon	Mount Lemmon Survey	·	1.1 km	MPC · JPL
187030	2005 EZ_{265}	—	March 13, 2005	Catalina	CSS	V	1.1 km	MPC · JPL
187031	2005 EY_{317}	—	March 13, 2005	Catalina	CSS	H	900 m	MPC · JPL
187032	2005 GF_{32}	—	April 4, 2005	Catalina	CSS	·	1.1 km	MPC · JPL
187033	2005 GH_{64}	—	April 2, 2005	Anderson Mesa	LONEOS	H	820 m	MPC · JPL
187034	2005 GG_{74}	—	April 5, 2005	Catalina	CSS	H	910 m	MPC · JPL
187035	2005 JT_{15}	—	May 3, 2005	Kitt Peak	Spacewatch	·	1 km	MPC · JPL
187036	2005 JS_{28}	—	May 3, 2005	Kitt Peak	Spacewatch	·	1.4 km	MPC · JPL
187037	2005 JJ_{74}	—	May 8, 2005	Socorro	LINEAR	·	1.0 km	MPC · JPL
187038	2005 JF_{97}	—	May 8, 2005	Kitt Peak	Spacewatch	·	1.2 km	MPC · JPL
187039	2005 JL_{105}	—	May 11, 2005	Mount Lemmon	Mount Lemmon Survey	·	1.0 km	MPC · JPL
187040	2005 JS_{108}	—	May 14, 2005	Socorro	LINEAR	APO · PHA	430 m	MPC · JPL
187041	2005 JS_{127}	—	May 12, 2005	Socorro	LINEAR	·	1.6 km	MPC · JPL
187042	2005 KZ_{2}	—	May 16, 2005	Palomar	NEAT	·	1.1 km	MPC · JPL
187043	2005 KE_{12}	—	May 20, 2005	Palomar	NEAT	·	1.1 km	MPC · JPL
187044	2005 LF_{15}	—	June 8, 2005	Socorro	LINEAR	·	730 m	MPC · JPL
187045	2005 LO_{21}	—	June 6, 2005	Kitt Peak	Spacewatch	·	1.2 km	MPC · JPL
187046	2005 LT_{23}	—	June 11, 2005	Kitt Peak	Spacewatch	·	1.7 km	MPC · JPL
187047	2005 LZ_{29}	—	June 11, 2005	Kitt Peak	Spacewatch	·	1.6 km	MPC · JPL
187048	2005 LV_{38}	—	June 11, 2005	Kitt Peak	Spacewatch	·	1.0 km	MPC · JPL
187049	2005 LK_{41}	—	June 12, 2005	Kitt Peak	Spacewatch	·	1.8 km	MPC · JPL
187050	2005 LQ_{48}	—	June 15, 2005	Mount Lemmon	Mount Lemmon Survey	·	910 m	MPC · JPL
187051	2005 LY_{51}	—	June 15, 2005	Mount Lemmon	Mount Lemmon Survey	·	1.1 km	MPC · JPL
187052	2005 MY	—	June 17, 2005	Mount Lemmon	Mount Lemmon Survey	NYS ·	2.4 km	MPC · JPL
187053	2005 MX_{4}	—	June 18, 2005	Mount Lemmon	Mount Lemmon Survey	·	1.3 km	MPC · JPL
187054	2005 MP_{6}	—	June 26, 2005	Palomar	NEAT	·	1.5 km	MPC · JPL
187055	2005 MR_{8}	—	June 28, 2005	Kitt Peak	Spacewatch	·	1.1 km	MPC · JPL
187056	2005 MG_{10}	—	June 27, 2005	Kitt Peak	Spacewatch	V	690 m	MPC · JPL
187057	2005 MV_{11}	—	June 27, 2005	Kitt Peak	Spacewatch	·	1.6 km	MPC · JPL
187058	2005 MB_{17}	—	June 27, 2005	Kitt Peak	Spacewatch	·	2.2 km	MPC · JPL
187059	2005 ML_{18}	—	June 28, 2005	Palomar	NEAT	·	1.1 km	MPC · JPL
187060	2005 MX_{26}	—	June 29, 2005	Kitt Peak	Spacewatch	·	1.2 km	MPC · JPL
187061	2005 MJ_{27}	—	June 29, 2005	Kitt Peak	Spacewatch	·	1.8 km	MPC · JPL
187062	2005 MR_{31}	—	June 28, 2005	Palomar	NEAT	·	1.2 km	MPC · JPL
187063	2005 MT_{31}	—	June 28, 2005	Kitt Peak	Spacewatch	·	2.3 km	MPC · JPL
187064	2005 MN_{37}	—	June 30, 2005	Kitt Peak	Spacewatch	·	1.5 km	MPC · JPL
187065	2005 MU_{40}	—	June 30, 2005	Kitt Peak	Spacewatch	·	1.1 km	MPC · JPL
187066	2005 MH_{41}	—	June 30, 2005	Kitt Peak	Spacewatch	NYS	1.3 km	MPC · JPL
187067	2005 MX_{41}	—	June 30, 2005	Kitt Peak	Spacewatch	·	1.9 km	MPC · JPL
187068	2005 MM_{42}	—	June 29, 2005	Kitt Peak	Spacewatch	·	980 m	MPC · JPL
187069	2005 MG_{50}	—	June 30, 2005	Anderson Mesa	LONEOS	·	1.1 km	MPC · JPL
187070	2005 MG_{52}	—	June 30, 2005	Anderson Mesa	LONEOS	V	920 m	MPC · JPL
187071	2005 MK_{53}	—	June 28, 2005	Palomar	NEAT	·	2.2 km	MPC · JPL
187072	2005 NM_{9}	—	July 1, 2005	Kitt Peak	Spacewatch	·	1.1 km	MPC · JPL
187073	2005 NS_{23}	—	July 4, 2005	Kitt Peak	Spacewatch	·	4.3 km	MPC · JPL
187074	2005 NH_{28}	—	July 5, 2005	Palomar	NEAT	·	1.4 km	MPC · JPL
187075	2005 NA_{31}	—	July 4, 2005	Mount Lemmon	Mount Lemmon Survey	NYS	1.8 km	MPC · JPL
187076	2005 NH_{42}	—	July 5, 2005	Kitt Peak	Spacewatch	·	1.8 km	MPC · JPL
187077	2005 NR_{48}	—	July 8, 2005	Kitt Peak	Spacewatch	·	960 m	MPC · JPL
187078	2005 NA_{54}	—	July 10, 2005	Kitt Peak	Spacewatch	NYS	1.7 km	MPC · JPL
187079	2005 NR_{54}	—	July 10, 2005	Kitt Peak	Spacewatch	·	950 m	MPC · JPL
187080	2005 NO_{60}	—	July 9, 2005	Catalina	CSS	·	1.6 km	MPC · JPL
187081	2005 NX_{65}	—	July 1, 2005	Kitt Peak	Spacewatch	·	1.6 km	MPC · JPL
187082	2005 NR_{68}	—	July 3, 2005	Palomar	NEAT	(2076)	1.4 km	MPC · JPL
187083	2005 NZ_{82}	—	July 14, 2005	Reedy Creek	J. Broughton	·	1.7 km	MPC · JPL
187084	2005 NK_{85}	—	July 3, 2005	Mount Lemmon	Mount Lemmon Survey	MAS	1.4 km	MPC · JPL
187085	2005 ND_{122}	—	July 12, 2005	Kitt Peak	Spacewatch	WIT	1.3 km	MPC · JPL
187086	2005 OP_{1}	—	July 26, 2005	Palomar	NEAT	·	1.3 km	MPC · JPL
187087	2005 OA_{14}	—	July 30, 2005	Palomar	NEAT	V	1.0 km	MPC · JPL
187088	2005 OF_{14}	—	July 30, 2005	Siding Spring	SSS	·	1.8 km	MPC · JPL
187089	2005 PE_{5}	—	August 7, 2005	Reedy Creek	J. Broughton	(2076)	1.1 km	MPC · JPL
187090	2005 PK_{9}	—	August 4, 2005	Palomar	NEAT	·	1.2 km	MPC · JPL
187091	2005 PC_{20}	—	August 6, 2005	Palomar	NEAT	·	1.1 km	MPC · JPL
187092	2005 QJ_{2}	—	August 24, 2005	Palomar	NEAT	·	2.0 km	MPC · JPL
187093	2005 QA_{3}	—	August 24, 2005	Palomar	NEAT	·	1.9 km	MPC · JPL
187094	2005 QS_{3}	—	August 24, 2005	Palomar	NEAT	·	2.3 km	MPC · JPL
187095	2005 QL_{5}	—	August 22, 2005	Palomar	NEAT	·	2.3 km	MPC · JPL
187096	2005 QZ_{12}	—	August 24, 2005	Palomar	NEAT	·	1.5 km	MPC · JPL
187097	2005 QV_{15}	—	August 25, 2005	Palomar	NEAT	·	1.5 km	MPC · JPL
187098	2005 QS_{20}	—	August 26, 2005	Anderson Mesa	LONEOS	·	3.0 km	MPC · JPL
187099	2005 QD_{21}	—	August 26, 2005	Anderson Mesa	LONEOS	·	1.3 km	MPC · JPL
187100	2005 QS_{24}	—	August 27, 2005	Kitt Peak	Spacewatch	MAS	1.1 km	MPC · JPL

== 187101–187200 ==
back to top

Designation			Discovery			Properties		Ref
Permanent	Provisional	Named after	Date	Site	Discoverer(s)	Category	Diam.	Ref
187101	2005 QW_{25}	—	August 27, 2005	Kitt Peak	Spacewatch	·	2.4 km	MPC · JPL
187102	2005 QC_{30}	—	August 29, 2005	Anderson Mesa	LONEOS	·	1.6 km	MPC · JPL
187103	2005 QX_{32}	—	August 25, 2005	Palomar	NEAT	NYS	1.7 km	MPC · JPL
187104	2005 QU_{37}	—	August 25, 2005	Palomar	NEAT	·	2.3 km	MPC · JPL
187105	2005 QZ_{37}	—	August 25, 2005	Palomar	NEAT	·	2.0 km	MPC · JPL
187106	2005 QW_{42}	—	August 26, 2005	Anderson Mesa	LONEOS	HNS	1.9 km	MPC · JPL
187107	2005 QV_{44}	—	August 26, 2005	Palomar	NEAT	MAS	1.2 km	MPC · JPL
187108	2005 QT_{48}	—	August 26, 2005	Palomar	NEAT	·	1.6 km	MPC · JPL
187109	2005 QP_{49}	—	August 26, 2005	Palomar	NEAT	·	1.7 km	MPC · JPL
187110	2005 QC_{55}	—	August 28, 2005	Anderson Mesa	LONEOS	MAS	1.2 km	MPC · JPL
187111	2005 QG_{56}	—	August 28, 2005	Kitt Peak	Spacewatch	·	3.0 km	MPC · JPL
187112	2005 QN_{60}	—	August 26, 2005	Anderson Mesa	LONEOS	·	1.6 km	MPC · JPL
187113	2005 QN_{62}	—	August 26, 2005	Palomar	NEAT	·	1.7 km	MPC · JPL
187114	2005 QK_{69}	—	August 28, 2005	Siding Spring	SSS	·	1.7 km	MPC · JPL
187115	2005 QU_{69}	—	August 29, 2005	Kitt Peak	Spacewatch	NYS ·	2.8 km	MPC · JPL
187116	2005 QC_{71}	—	August 29, 2005	Kitt Peak	Spacewatch	NYS	1.5 km	MPC · JPL
187117	2005 QG_{73}	—	August 29, 2005	Anderson Mesa	LONEOS	·	2.6 km	MPC · JPL
187118	2005 QE_{78}	—	August 25, 2005	Palomar	NEAT	HOF	3.4 km	MPC · JPL
187119	2005 QD_{79}	—	August 26, 2005	Campo Imperatore	CINEOS	·	1.5 km	MPC · JPL
187120	2005 QO_{82}	—	August 29, 2005	Anderson Mesa	LONEOS	·	1.7 km	MPC · JPL
187121	2005 QQ_{82}	—	August 29, 2005	Socorro	LINEAR	·	4.9 km	MPC · JPL
187122	2005 QP_{83}	—	August 29, 2005	Anderson Mesa	LONEOS	·	920 m	MPC · JPL
187123 Schorderet	2005 QO_{84}	Schorderet	August 30, 2005	Vicques	M. Ory	·	1.9 km	MPC · JPL
187124	2005 QX_{84}	—	August 30, 2005	Socorro	LINEAR	·	1.7 km	MPC · JPL
187125 Marxgyörgy	2005 QD_{87}	Marxgyörgy	August 31, 2005	Piszkéstető	K. Sárneczky, Kuli, Z.	slow	2.8 km	MPC · JPL
187126	2005 QN_{91}	—	August 25, 2005	Campo Imperatore	CINEOS	NYS	1.9 km	MPC · JPL
187127	2005 QG_{96}	—	August 27, 2005	Palomar	NEAT	·	2.0 km	MPC · JPL
187128	2005 QW_{99}	—	August 27, 2005	Palomar	NEAT	·	2.1 km	MPC · JPL
187129	2005 QY_{104}	—	August 27, 2005	Palomar	NEAT	·	2.5 km	MPC · JPL
187130	2005 QV_{110}	—	August 27, 2005	Palomar	NEAT	·	3.4 km	MPC · JPL
187131	2005 QF_{114}	—	August 27, 2005	Palomar	NEAT	·	1.8 km	MPC · JPL
187132	2005 QM_{115}	—	August 27, 2005	Palomar	NEAT	HOF	3.7 km	MPC · JPL
187133	2005 QO_{115}	—	August 27, 2005	Palomar	NEAT	·	3.5 km	MPC · JPL
187134	2005 QG_{127}	—	August 28, 2005	Kitt Peak	Spacewatch	·	1.3 km	MPC · JPL
187135	2005 QX_{133}	—	August 28, 2005	Kitt Peak	Spacewatch	·	2.2 km	MPC · JPL
187136	2005 QQ_{134}	—	August 28, 2005	Kitt Peak	Spacewatch	AGN	1.4 km	MPC · JPL
187137	2005 QU_{137}	—	August 28, 2005	Kitt Peak	Spacewatch	·	2.1 km	MPC · JPL
187138	2005 QW_{137}	—	August 28, 2005	Kitt Peak	Spacewatch	KOR	1.9 km	MPC · JPL
187139	2005 QX_{140}	—	August 29, 2005	Socorro	LINEAR	·	2.4 km	MPC · JPL
187140	2005 QV_{145}	—	August 27, 2005	Palomar	NEAT	·	2.0 km	MPC · JPL
187141	2005 QG_{146}	—	August 28, 2005	Anderson Mesa	LONEOS	·	2.0 km	MPC · JPL
187142	2005 QN_{148}	—	August 30, 2005	Anderson Mesa	LONEOS	V	930 m	MPC · JPL
187143	2005 QV_{161}	—	August 28, 2005	Siding Spring	SSS	·	1.5 km	MPC · JPL
187144	2005 QM_{162}	—	August 30, 2005	Palomar	NEAT	·	1.9 km	MPC · JPL
187145	2005 QG_{165}	—	August 31, 2005	Palomar	NEAT	AGN	1.9 km	MPC · JPL
187146	2005 QB_{166}	—	August 31, 2005	Palomar	NEAT	(5)	2.0 km	MPC · JPL
187147	2005 QK_{169}	—	August 29, 2005	Palomar	NEAT	·	1.9 km	MPC · JPL
187148	2005 QZ_{171}	—	August 29, 2005	Palomar	NEAT	·	3.8 km	MPC · JPL
187149	2005 QF_{175}	—	August 31, 2005	Kitt Peak	Spacewatch	·	1.6 km	MPC · JPL
187150	2005 QP_{175}	—	August 31, 2005	Palomar	NEAT	PAD	2.3 km	MPC · JPL
187151	2005 QN_{178}	—	August 27, 2005	Palomar	NEAT	WIT	1.5 km	MPC · JPL
187152	2005 QT_{178}	—	August 29, 2005	Kitt Peak	Spacewatch	·	1.9 km	MPC · JPL
187153	2005 QS_{182}	—	August 31, 2005	Kitt Peak	Spacewatch	·	2.4 km	MPC · JPL
187154	2005 QV_{182}	—	August 25, 2005	Palomar	NEAT	·	1.9 km	MPC · JPL
187155	2005 RH_{3}	—	September 5, 2005	Catalina	CSS	NYS	1.8 km	MPC · JPL
187156	2005 RX_{5}	—	September 6, 2005	Anderson Mesa	LONEOS	V	790 m	MPC · JPL
187157	2005 RT_{9}	—	September 9, 2005	Socorro	LINEAR	·	1.9 km	MPC · JPL
187158	2005 RE_{10}	—	September 8, 2005	Uccle	T. Pauwels	·	2.8 km	MPC · JPL
187159	2005 RG_{10}	—	September 8, 2005	Socorro	LINEAR	·	1.5 km	MPC · JPL
187160	2005 RG_{22}	—	September 8, 2005	Socorro	LINEAR	·	1.3 km	MPC · JPL
187161	2005 RS_{22}	—	September 11, 2005	Jarnac	Jarnac	V	1.0 km	MPC · JPL
187162	2005 RE_{29}	—	September 12, 2005	Haleakala	NEAT	·	1.7 km	MPC · JPL
187163	2005 RY_{33}	—	September 13, 2005	Anderson Mesa	LONEOS	PHO	1.6 km	MPC · JPL
187164	2005 RF_{42}	—	September 14, 2005	Kitt Peak	Spacewatch	·	1.9 km	MPC · JPL
187165	2005 RB_{44}	—	September 14, 2005	Kitt Peak	Spacewatch	·	1.2 km	MPC · JPL
187166	2005 RD_{46}	—	September 14, 2005	Apache Point	A. C. Becker	·	2.8 km	MPC · JPL
187167	2005 SJ_{5}	—	September 23, 2005	Catalina	CSS	BRU	3.5 km	MPC · JPL
187168	2005 SR_{8}	—	September 25, 2005	Kitt Peak	Spacewatch	·	3.8 km	MPC · JPL
187169	2005 SB_{13}	—	September 24, 2005	Kitt Peak	Spacewatch	KOR	1.6 km	MPC · JPL
187170	2005 SH_{13}	—	September 24, 2005	Kitt Peak	Spacewatch	MAS	1.1 km	MPC · JPL
187171	2005 SN_{13}	—	September 24, 2005	Kitt Peak	Spacewatch	·	3.1 km	MPC · JPL
187172	2005 SM_{18}	—	September 26, 2005	Kitt Peak	Spacewatch	KOR	1.9 km	MPC · JPL
187173	2005 SR_{26}	—	September 23, 2005	Kitt Peak	Spacewatch	AEO	1.8 km	MPC · JPL
187174	2005 SF_{30}	—	September 23, 2005	Kitt Peak	Spacewatch	·	1.8 km	MPC · JPL
187175	2005 SN_{35}	—	September 23, 2005	Kitt Peak	Spacewatch	(7744)	2.1 km	MPC · JPL
187176	2005 SP_{36}	—	September 24, 2005	Kitt Peak	Spacewatch	MAS	920 m	MPC · JPL
187177	2005 SZ_{37}	—	September 24, 2005	Kitt Peak	Spacewatch	THM	2.8 km	MPC · JPL
187178	2005 SH_{39}	—	September 24, 2005	Kitt Peak	Spacewatch	·	2.3 km	MPC · JPL
187179	2005 SV_{44}	—	September 24, 2005	Kitt Peak	Spacewatch	·	3.3 km	MPC · JPL
187180	2005 SY_{49}	—	September 24, 2005	Kitt Peak	Spacewatch	·	4.2 km	MPC · JPL
187181	2005 SD_{51}	—	September 24, 2005	Kitt Peak	Spacewatch	HYG	3.4 km	MPC · JPL
187182	2005 SJ_{51}	—	September 24, 2005	Kitt Peak	Spacewatch	·	1.3 km	MPC · JPL
187183	2005 SH_{60}	—	September 26, 2005	Kitt Peak	Spacewatch	·	2.7 km	MPC · JPL
187184	2005 SO_{60}	—	September 26, 2005	Palomar	NEAT	·	2.0 km	MPC · JPL
187185	2005 ST_{61}	—	September 26, 2005	Kitt Peak	Spacewatch	·	2.1 km	MPC · JPL
187186	2005 SK_{62}	—	September 26, 2005	Kitt Peak	Spacewatch	·	2.2 km	MPC · JPL
187187	2005 SY_{65}	—	September 26, 2005	Catalina	CSS	·	2.9 km	MPC · JPL
187188	2005 SR_{66}	—	September 27, 2005	Kitt Peak	Spacewatch	·	4.4 km	MPC · JPL
187189	2005 SB_{67}	—	September 27, 2005	Kitt Peak	Spacewatch	·	2.1 km	MPC · JPL
187190	2005 SS_{68}	—	September 27, 2005	Kitt Peak	Spacewatch	PAD	2.6 km	MPC · JPL
187191	2005 SU_{68}	—	September 27, 2005	Kitt Peak	Spacewatch	NYS	1.6 km	MPC · JPL
187192	2005 SE_{70}	—	September 27, 2005	Palomar	NEAT	PAD	2.7 km	MPC · JPL
187193	2005 SF_{72}	—	September 23, 2005	Catalina	CSS	EOS	2.7 km	MPC · JPL
187194	2005 SW_{74}	—	September 24, 2005	Kitt Peak	Spacewatch	·	2.0 km	MPC · JPL
187195	2005 SQ_{76}	—	September 24, 2005	Kitt Peak	Spacewatch	·	2.2 km	MPC · JPL
187196	2005 SG_{78}	—	September 24, 2005	Kitt Peak	Spacewatch	·	1.7 km	MPC · JPL
187197	2005 SF_{79}	—	September 24, 2005	Kitt Peak	Spacewatch	AGN	1.5 km	MPC · JPL
187198	2005 SA_{80}	—	September 24, 2005	Kitt Peak	Spacewatch	·	2.3 km	MPC · JPL
187199	2005 SM_{81}	—	September 24, 2005	Kitt Peak	Spacewatch	·	2.0 km	MPC · JPL
187200	2005 SX_{81}	—	September 24, 2005	Kitt Peak	Spacewatch	·	1.9 km	MPC · JPL

== 187201–187300 ==
back to top

Designation			Discovery			Properties		Ref
Permanent	Provisional	Named after	Date	Site	Discoverer(s)	Category	Diam.	Ref
187201	2005 SG_{83}	—	September 24, 2005	Kitt Peak	Spacewatch	·	2.0 km	MPC · JPL
187202	2005 SW_{84}	—	September 24, 2005	Kitt Peak	Spacewatch	·	5.4 km	MPC · JPL
187203	2005 SB_{85}	—	September 24, 2005	Kitt Peak	Spacewatch	fast	3.0 km	MPC · JPL
187204	2005 SL_{89}	—	September 24, 2005	Kitt Peak	Spacewatch	·	2.8 km	MPC · JPL
187205	2005 ST_{92}	—	September 24, 2005	Kitt Peak	Spacewatch	·	2.1 km	MPC · JPL
187206	2005 SG_{95}	—	September 25, 2005	Kitt Peak	Spacewatch	·	2.3 km	MPC · JPL
187207	2005 SR_{95}	—	September 25, 2005	Kitt Peak	Spacewatch	·	2.6 km	MPC · JPL
187208	2005 SD_{96}	—	September 25, 2005	Kitt Peak	Spacewatch	·	1.6 km	MPC · JPL
187209	2005 SH_{104}	—	September 25, 2005	Kitt Peak	Spacewatch	·	2.4 km	MPC · JPL
187210	2005 SO_{105}	—	September 25, 2005	Kitt Peak	Spacewatch	(5)	2.0 km	MPC · JPL
187211	2005 SS_{105}	—	September 25, 2005	Palomar	NEAT	·	5.2 km	MPC · JPL
187212	2005 SY_{105}	—	September 25, 2005	Kitt Peak	Spacewatch	·	2.5 km	MPC · JPL
187213	2005 SL_{110}	—	September 26, 2005	Kitt Peak	Spacewatch	·	1.7 km	MPC · JPL
187214	2005 SD_{111}	—	September 26, 2005	Kitt Peak	Spacewatch	·	3.9 km	MPC · JPL
187215	2005 SL_{111}	—	September 26, 2005	Palomar	NEAT	·	3.0 km	MPC · JPL
187216	2005 SV_{111}	—	September 26, 2005	Kitt Peak	Spacewatch	·	2.3 km	MPC · JPL
187217	2005 SU_{118}	—	September 28, 2005	Palomar	NEAT	·	3.8 km	MPC · JPL
187218	2005 SY_{119}	—	September 29, 2005	Kitt Peak	Spacewatch	NYS	1.2 km	MPC · JPL
187219	2005 SM_{125}	—	September 29, 2005	Mount Lemmon	Mount Lemmon Survey	NEM	2.7 km	MPC · JPL
187220	2005 SX_{129}	—	September 29, 2005	Anderson Mesa	LONEOS	AGN	1.9 km	MPC · JPL
187221	2005 SP_{133}	—	September 29, 2005	Kitt Peak	Spacewatch	·	2.2 km	MPC · JPL
187222	2005 SZ_{135}	—	September 24, 2005	Kitt Peak	Spacewatch	·	2.0 km	MPC · JPL
187223	2005 SX_{139}	—	September 25, 2005	Kitt Peak	Spacewatch	KOR	1.5 km	MPC · JPL
187224	2005 SS_{140}	—	September 25, 2005	Kitt Peak	Spacewatch	·	2.4 km	MPC · JPL
187225	2005 SG_{141}	—	September 25, 2005	Kitt Peak	Spacewatch	KOR	1.9 km	MPC · JPL
187226	2005 SH_{141}	—	September 25, 2005	Kitt Peak	Spacewatch	·	2.3 km	MPC · JPL
187227	2005 SJ_{143}	—	September 25, 2005	Kitt Peak	Spacewatch	KOR	1.4 km	MPC · JPL
187228	2005 SC_{144}	—	September 25, 2005	Kitt Peak	Spacewatch	·	2.4 km	MPC · JPL
187229	2005 SB_{145}	—	September 25, 2005	Kitt Peak	Spacewatch	·	1.6 km	MPC · JPL
187230	2005 SQ_{152}	—	September 25, 2005	Palomar	NEAT	WAT	2.7 km	MPC · JPL
187231	2005 SR_{152}	—	September 25, 2005	Palomar	NEAT	·	3.4 km	MPC · JPL
187232	2005 SN_{153}	—	September 26, 2005	Catalina	CSS	·	2.0 km	MPC · JPL
187233	2005 SC_{154}	—	September 26, 2005	Kitt Peak	Spacewatch	·	1.4 km	MPC · JPL
187234	2005 SW_{154}	—	September 26, 2005	Kitt Peak	Spacewatch	·	2.4 km	MPC · JPL
187235	2005 SE_{157}	—	September 26, 2005	Kitt Peak	Spacewatch	WIT	1.5 km	MPC · JPL
187236	2005 SD_{160}	—	September 27, 2005	Kitt Peak	Spacewatch	·	2.7 km	MPC · JPL
187237	2005 SJ_{160}	—	September 27, 2005	Kitt Peak	Spacewatch	·	2.3 km	MPC · JPL
187238	2005 SH_{167}	—	September 28, 2005	Palomar	NEAT	·	2.6 km	MPC · JPL
187239	2005 SR_{169}	—	September 29, 2005	Kitt Peak	Spacewatch	(5)	1.5 km	MPC · JPL
187240	2005 SK_{180}	—	September 29, 2005	Mount Lemmon	Mount Lemmon Survey	·	1.9 km	MPC · JPL
187241	2005 SO_{180}	—	September 29, 2005	Mount Lemmon	Mount Lemmon Survey	MAS	820 m	MPC · JPL
187242	2005 SR_{180}	—	September 29, 2005	Mount Lemmon	Mount Lemmon Survey	NYS	1.4 km	MPC · JPL
187243	2005 SA_{184}	—	September 29, 2005	Kitt Peak	Spacewatch	·	2.6 km	MPC · JPL
187244	2005 SO_{190}	—	September 29, 2005	Anderson Mesa	LONEOS	·	3.2 km	MPC · JPL
187245	2005 SV_{190}	—	September 29, 2005	Anderson Mesa	LONEOS	fast	3.4 km	MPC · JPL
187246	2005 SU_{192}	—	September 29, 2005	Catalina	CSS	·	3.3 km	MPC · JPL
187247	2005 SA_{195}	—	September 30, 2005	Kitt Peak	Spacewatch	·	2.1 km	MPC · JPL
187248	2005 SS_{210}	—	September 30, 2005	Palomar	NEAT	·	4.1 km	MPC · JPL
187249	2005 SS_{219}	—	September 30, 2005	Palomar	NEAT	·	4.1 km	MPC · JPL
187250	2005 SQ_{221}	—	September 30, 2005	Catalina	CSS	·	6.2 km	MPC · JPL
187251	2005 ST_{225}	—	September 30, 2005	Kitt Peak	Spacewatch	·	2.7 km	MPC · JPL
187252	2005 SA_{229}	—	September 30, 2005	Mount Lemmon	Mount Lemmon Survey	KOR	1.6 km	MPC · JPL
187253	2005 SG_{235}	—	September 29, 2005	Mount Lemmon	Mount Lemmon Survey	·	2.5 km	MPC · JPL
187254	2005 SL_{237}	—	September 29, 2005	Kitt Peak	Spacewatch	·	5.2 km	MPC · JPL
187255	2005 SD_{248}	—	September 30, 2005	Kitt Peak	Spacewatch	KOR	1.7 km	MPC · JPL
187256	2005 SG_{248}	—	September 30, 2005	Palomar	NEAT	HOF	3.9 km	MPC · JPL
187257	2005 SX_{250}	—	September 23, 2005	Kitt Peak	Spacewatch	·	3.2 km	MPC · JPL
187258	2005 SF_{259}	—	September 24, 2005	Anderson Mesa	LONEOS	·	1.7 km	MPC · JPL
187259	2005 SK_{278}	—	September 24, 2005	Kitt Peak	Spacewatch	·	2.8 km	MPC · JPL
187260	2005 SH_{279}	—	September 30, 2005	Mount Lemmon	Mount Lemmon Survey	KOR	1.5 km	MPC · JPL
187261	2005 SM_{279}	—	September 23, 2005	Kitt Peak	Spacewatch	·	2.9 km	MPC · JPL
187262	2005 SW_{281}	—	September 26, 2005	Kitt Peak	Spacewatch	KOR	1.9 km	MPC · JPL
187263	2005 TH_{1}	—	October 1, 2005	Catalina	CSS	·	2.7 km	MPC · JPL
187264	2005 TQ_{3}	—	October 1, 2005	Anderson Mesa	LONEOS	GEF	1.8 km	MPC · JPL
187265	2005 TS_{9}	—	October 1, 2005	Mount Lemmon	Mount Lemmon Survey	·	4.1 km	MPC · JPL
187266	2005 TO_{21}	—	October 1, 2005	Kitt Peak	Spacewatch	·	2.8 km	MPC · JPL
187267	2005 TA_{32}	—	October 1, 2005	Kitt Peak	Spacewatch	MAS	890 m	MPC · JPL
187268	2005 TH_{32}	—	October 1, 2005	Socorro	LINEAR	·	1.5 km	MPC · JPL
187269	2005 TN_{33}	—	October 1, 2005	Kitt Peak	Spacewatch	·	2.6 km	MPC · JPL
187270	2005 TT_{34}	—	October 1, 2005	Kitt Peak	Spacewatch	(29841)	1.9 km	MPC · JPL
187271	2005 TU_{40}	—	October 1, 2005	Anderson Mesa	LONEOS	·	3.5 km	MPC · JPL
187272	2005 TV_{43}	—	October 5, 2005	Socorro	LINEAR	·	2.5 km	MPC · JPL
187273	2005 TJ_{45}	—	October 5, 2005	Socorro	LINEAR	·	4.7 km	MPC · JPL
187274	2005 TV_{45}	—	October 7, 2005	Reedy Creek	J. Broughton	·	3.0 km	MPC · JPL
187275	2005 TZ_{46}	—	October 3, 2005	Catalina	CSS	·	1.6 km	MPC · JPL
187276 Meištas	2005 TM_{48}	Meištas	October 8, 2005	Moletai	K. Černis, Zdanavicius, J.	MRX	1.8 km	MPC · JPL
187277	2005 TA_{53}	—	October 1, 2005	Anderson Mesa	LONEOS	EUN	1.1 km	MPC · JPL
187278	2005 TK_{55}	—	October 5, 2005	Socorro	LINEAR	AGN	1.5 km	MPC · JPL
187279	2005 TE_{57}	—	October 1, 2005	Mount Lemmon	Mount Lemmon Survey	·	4.1 km	MPC · JPL
187280	2005 TS_{57}	—	October 1, 2005	Mount Lemmon	Mount Lemmon Survey	·	2.9 km	MPC · JPL
187281	2005 TK_{59}	—	October 1, 2005	Mount Lemmon	Mount Lemmon Survey	·	2.6 km	MPC · JPL
187282	2005 TH_{62}	—	October 4, 2005	Mount Lemmon	Mount Lemmon Survey	·	2.6 km	MPC · JPL
187283 Jeffhopkins	2005 TC_{66}	Jeffhopkins	October 3, 2005	Catalina	CSS	AGN	1.6 km	MPC · JPL
187284	2005 TT_{68}	—	October 6, 2005	Kitt Peak	Spacewatch	·	3.7 km	MPC · JPL
187285	2005 TS_{72}	—	October 5, 2005	Catalina	CSS	·	1.9 km	MPC · JPL
187286	2005 TU_{72}	—	October 5, 2005	Catalina	CSS	EUN	1.9 km	MPC · JPL
187287	2005 TZ_{73}	—	October 7, 2005	Anderson Mesa	LONEOS	·	4.9 km	MPC · JPL
187288	2005 TY_{88}	—	October 5, 2005	Mount Lemmon	Mount Lemmon Survey	·	1.2 km	MPC · JPL
187289	2005 TO_{91}	—	October 6, 2005	Mount Lemmon	Mount Lemmon Survey	·	2.3 km	MPC · JPL
187290	2005 TW_{99}	—	October 7, 2005	Socorro	LINEAR	·	2.5 km	MPC · JPL
187291	2005 TY_{99}	—	October 7, 2005	Socorro	LINEAR	·	2.7 km	MPC · JPL
187292	2005 TC_{101}	—	October 7, 2005	Catalina	CSS	MAS	900 m	MPC · JPL
187293	2005 TV_{121}	—	October 7, 2005	Kitt Peak	Spacewatch	·	4.3 km	MPC · JPL
187294	2005 TJ_{126}	—	October 7, 2005	Kitt Peak	Spacewatch	AGN	1.4 km	MPC · JPL
187295	2005 TF_{132}	—	October 7, 2005	Kitt Peak	Spacewatch	·	2.4 km	MPC · JPL
187296	2005 TV_{139}	—	October 8, 2005	Kitt Peak	Spacewatch	KOR	1.6 km	MPC · JPL
187297	2005 TE_{142}	—	October 8, 2005	Kitt Peak	Spacewatch	EOS	2.6 km	MPC · JPL
187298	2005 TV_{142}	—	October 8, 2005	Kitt Peak	Spacewatch	·	2.4 km	MPC · JPL
187299	2005 TY_{151}	—	October 10, 2005	Kitt Peak	Spacewatch	THM	2.9 km	MPC · JPL
187300	2005 TX_{156}	—	October 9, 2005	Kitt Peak	Spacewatch	EOS	2.7 km	MPC · JPL

== 187301–187400 ==
back to top

Designation			Discovery			Properties		Ref
Permanent	Provisional	Named after	Date	Site	Discoverer(s)	Category	Diam.	Ref
187301	2005 TU_{180}	—	October 1, 2005	Mount Lemmon	Mount Lemmon Survey	·	2.3 km	MPC · JPL
187302	2005 TP_{191}	—	October 1, 2005	Catalina	CSS	·	3.9 km	MPC · JPL
187303	2005 TQ_{193}	—	October 1, 2005	Mount Lemmon	Mount Lemmon Survey	3:2	4.9 km	MPC · JPL
187304	2005 UV	—	October 23, 2005	Wrightwood	J. W. Young	·	2.4 km	MPC · JPL
187305	2005 UO_{2}	—	October 23, 2005	Eskridge	Farpoint	·	3.3 km	MPC · JPL
187306	2005 UG_{4}	—	October 25, 2005	Goodricke-Pigott	R. A. Tucker	·	2.8 km	MPC · JPL
187307	2005 UM_{9}	—	October 21, 2005	Palomar	NEAT	EUN	2.2 km	MPC · JPL
187308	2005 UV_{12}	—	October 21, 2005	Palomar	NEAT	KOR	1.9 km	MPC · JPL
187309	2005 UW_{15}	—	October 22, 2005	Kitt Peak	Spacewatch	·	2.6 km	MPC · JPL
187310	2005 UK_{19}	—	October 22, 2005	Catalina	CSS	AGN	1.7 km	MPC · JPL
187311	2005 UR_{26}	—	October 23, 2005	Catalina	CSS	LEO	2.7 km	MPC · JPL
187312	2005 UZ_{27}	—	October 23, 2005	Kitt Peak	Spacewatch	·	3.2 km	MPC · JPL
187313	2005 UH_{35}	—	October 24, 2005	Kitt Peak	Spacewatch	·	3.6 km	MPC · JPL
187314	2005 UY_{37}	—	October 24, 2005	Kitt Peak	Spacewatch	·	3.7 km	MPC · JPL
187315	2005 UZ_{37}	—	October 24, 2005	Kitt Peak	Spacewatch	KOR	1.9 km	MPC · JPL
187316	2005 UG_{40}	—	October 24, 2005	Kitt Peak	Spacewatch	·	2.6 km	MPC · JPL
187317	2005 UP_{40}	—	October 24, 2005	Kitt Peak	Spacewatch	KOR	1.8 km	MPC · JPL
187318	2005 UJ_{41}	—	October 24, 2005	Kitt Peak	Spacewatch	·	3.9 km	MPC · JPL
187319	2005 US_{43}	—	October 22, 2005	Kitt Peak	Spacewatch	·	6.0 km	MPC · JPL
187320	2005 UC_{49}	—	October 23, 2005	Catalina	CSS	MRX	1.5 km	MPC · JPL
187321	2005 UK_{55}	—	October 23, 2005	Catalina	CSS	HYG	3.5 km	MPC · JPL
187322	2005 UT_{57}	—	October 24, 2005	Kitt Peak	Spacewatch	·	1.4 km	MPC · JPL
187323	2005 UY_{59}	—	October 25, 2005	Anderson Mesa	LONEOS	·	2.8 km	MPC · JPL
187324	2005 UH_{68}	—	October 22, 2005	Palomar	NEAT	MRX	1.5 km	MPC · JPL
187325	2005 UL_{73}	—	October 23, 2005	Palomar	NEAT	·	5.6 km	MPC · JPL
187326	2005 UH_{78}	—	October 25, 2005	Mount Lemmon	Mount Lemmon Survey	·	2.6 km	MPC · JPL
187327	2005 UX_{78}	—	October 25, 2005	Catalina	CSS	VER	4.5 km	MPC · JPL
187328	2005 UA_{80}	—	October 25, 2005	Kitt Peak	Spacewatch	HOF	4.1 km	MPC · JPL
187329	2005 UK_{80}	—	October 25, 2005	Kitt Peak	Spacewatch	EOS	3.0 km	MPC · JPL
187330	2005 UN_{84}	—	October 22, 2005	Kitt Peak	Spacewatch	·	2.1 km	MPC · JPL
187331	2005 UR_{85}	—	October 22, 2005	Kitt Peak	Spacewatch	·	3.4 km	MPC · JPL
187332	2005 UR_{87}	—	October 22, 2005	Kitt Peak	Spacewatch	·	2.6 km	MPC · JPL
187333	2005 UQ_{96}	—	October 22, 2005	Kitt Peak	Spacewatch	·	4.2 km	MPC · JPL
187334	2005 UO_{100}	—	October 22, 2005	Kitt Peak	Spacewatch	HOF	4.2 km	MPC · JPL
187335	2005 UO_{104}	—	October 22, 2005	Kitt Peak	Spacewatch	·	2.4 km	MPC · JPL
187336	2005 UP_{107}	—	October 22, 2005	Palomar	NEAT	·	2.7 km	MPC · JPL
187337	2005 UW_{108}	—	October 22, 2005	Catalina	CSS	·	1.6 km	MPC · JPL
187338	2005 UY_{116}	—	October 23, 2005	Catalina	CSS	·	4.0 km	MPC · JPL
187339	2005 UR_{127}	—	October 24, 2005	Kitt Peak	Spacewatch	KOR	2.2 km	MPC · JPL
187340	2005 UV_{131}	—	October 24, 2005	Palomar	NEAT	·	4.2 km	MPC · JPL
187341	2005 UT_{141}	—	October 25, 2005	Catalina	CSS	·	2.2 km	MPC · JPL
187342	2005 UH_{142}	—	October 25, 2005	Catalina	CSS	EOS	2.7 km	MPC · JPL
187343	2005 UL_{158}	—	October 28, 2005	Goodricke-Pigott	R. A. Tucker	·	3.1 km	MPC · JPL
187344	2005 UW_{159}	—	October 22, 2005	Catalina	CSS	·	2.7 km	MPC · JPL
187345	2005 UY_{159}	—	October 22, 2005	Catalina	CSS	AST	2.5 km	MPC · JPL
187346	2005 UB_{180}	—	October 24, 2005	Kitt Peak	Spacewatch	KOR	1.6 km	MPC · JPL
187347	2005 UJ_{188}	—	October 27, 2005	Mount Lemmon	Mount Lemmon Survey	·	2.5 km	MPC · JPL
187348	2005 UH_{195}	—	October 22, 2005	Kitt Peak	Spacewatch	·	5.1 km	MPC · JPL
187349	2005 UT_{200}	—	October 25, 2005	Kitt Peak	Spacewatch	·	2.6 km	MPC · JPL
187350	2005 UM_{201}	—	October 25, 2005	Kitt Peak	Spacewatch	·	3.2 km	MPC · JPL
187351	2005 UK_{213}	—	October 21, 2005	Palomar	NEAT	·	2.1 km	MPC · JPL
187352	2005 UH_{214}	—	October 24, 2005	Palomar	NEAT	·	4.6 km	MPC · JPL
187353	2005 UW_{215}	—	October 25, 2005	Kitt Peak	Spacewatch	·	5.0 km	MPC · JPL
187354	2005 UM_{229}	—	October 25, 2005	Kitt Peak	Spacewatch	KOR	1.6 km	MPC · JPL
187355	2005 US_{229}	—	October 25, 2005	Kitt Peak	Spacewatch	·	3.4 km	MPC · JPL
187356	2005 UW_{237}	—	October 25, 2005	Kitt Peak	Spacewatch	EOS ·	5.9 km	MPC · JPL
187357	2005 UW_{238}	—	October 25, 2005	Kitt Peak	Spacewatch	·	3.3 km	MPC · JPL
187358	2005 UZ_{250}	—	October 23, 2005	Catalina	CSS	·	5.4 km	MPC · JPL
187359	2005 UZ_{251}	—	October 25, 2005	Kitt Peak	Spacewatch	EOS	4.0 km	MPC · JPL
187360	2005 UW_{258}	—	October 25, 2005	Kitt Peak	Spacewatch	·	3.2 km	MPC · JPL
187361	2005 UP_{259}	—	October 25, 2005	Kitt Peak	Spacewatch	·	3.8 km	MPC · JPL
187362	2005 UH_{262}	—	October 26, 2005	Kitt Peak	Spacewatch	·	2.5 km	MPC · JPL
187363	2005 UK_{262}	—	October 26, 2005	Kitt Peak	Spacewatch	·	1.7 km	MPC · JPL
187364	2005 UR_{266}	—	October 27, 2005	Kitt Peak	Spacewatch	·	4.6 km	MPC · JPL
187365	2005 UO_{272}	—	October 28, 2005	Kitt Peak	Spacewatch	KOR	2.1 km	MPC · JPL
187366	2005 UK_{273}	—	October 28, 2005	Mount Lemmon	Mount Lemmon Survey	·	2.1 km	MPC · JPL
187367	2005 UB_{278}	—	October 24, 2005	Kitt Peak	Spacewatch	·	5.0 km	MPC · JPL
187368	2005 UE_{278}	—	October 24, 2005	Kitt Peak	Spacewatch	·	2.2 km	MPC · JPL
187369	2005 UT_{281}	—	October 25, 2005	Catalina	CSS	(5)	1.9 km	MPC · JPL
187370	2005 UU_{308}	—	October 28, 2005	Catalina	CSS	·	4.6 km	MPC · JPL
187371	2005 UO_{318}	—	October 27, 2005	Kitt Peak	Spacewatch	·	3.5 km	MPC · JPL
187372	2005 UT_{319}	—	October 27, 2005	Kitt Peak	Spacewatch	·	4.9 km	MPC · JPL
187373	2005 UC_{330}	—	October 28, 2005	Kitt Peak	Spacewatch	EOS	3.0 km	MPC · JPL
187374	2005 UN_{335}	—	October 30, 2005	Palomar	NEAT	(21885)	5.9 km	MPC · JPL
187375	2005 UQ_{352}	—	October 29, 2005	Catalina	CSS	·	2.7 km	MPC · JPL
187376	2005 US_{359}	—	October 25, 2005	Mount Lemmon	Mount Lemmon Survey	·	3.4 km	MPC · JPL
187377	2005 UC_{361}	—	October 27, 2005	Kitt Peak	Spacewatch	KOR	1.6 km	MPC · JPL
187378	2005 UJ_{361}	—	October 27, 2005	Kitt Peak	Spacewatch	T_{j} (2.99) · HIL · 3:2	6.1 km	MPC · JPL
187379	2005 UB_{368}	—	October 27, 2005	Kitt Peak	Spacewatch	·	2.6 km	MPC · JPL
187380	2005 UQ_{386}	—	October 30, 2005	Catalina	CSS	MAR	1.7 km	MPC · JPL
187381	2005 UZ_{395}	—	October 30, 2005	Mount Lemmon	Mount Lemmon Survey	KOR	1.6 km	MPC · JPL
187382	2005 UT_{401}	—	October 27, 2005	Kitt Peak	Spacewatch	·	2.9 km	MPC · JPL
187383	2005 UF_{404}	—	October 29, 2005	Mount Lemmon	Mount Lemmon Survey	THM	3.1 km	MPC · JPL
187384	2005 UN_{407}	—	October 30, 2005	Mount Lemmon	Mount Lemmon Survey	·	1.9 km	MPC · JPL
187385	2005 UJ_{412}	—	October 31, 2005	Mount Lemmon	Mount Lemmon Survey	EOS	2.9 km	MPC · JPL
187386	2005 UD_{455}	—	October 28, 2005	Kitt Peak	Spacewatch	AGN	1.6 km	MPC · JPL
187387	2005 UW_{456}	—	October 30, 2005	Kitt Peak	Spacewatch	·	4.2 km	MPC · JPL
187388	2005 UM_{461}	—	October 28, 2005	Mount Lemmon	Mount Lemmon Survey	VER	3.7 km	MPC · JPL
187389	2005 UF_{472}	—	October 30, 2005	Kitt Peak	Spacewatch	·	3.5 km	MPC · JPL
187390	2005 UB_{483}	—	October 22, 2005	Catalina	CSS	·	2.8 km	MPC · JPL
187391	2005 UF_{485}	—	October 22, 2005	Catalina	CSS	·	2.4 km	MPC · JPL
187392	2005 UA_{492}	—	October 24, 2005	Palomar	NEAT	·	6.7 km	MPC · JPL
187393	2005 UL_{494}	—	October 25, 2005	Catalina	CSS	·	5.7 km	MPC · JPL
187394	2005 UG_{501}	—	October 27, 2005	Catalina	CSS	·	3.5 km	MPC · JPL
187395	2005 UG_{511}	—	October 27, 2005	Anderson Mesa	LONEOS	·	4.6 km	MPC · JPL
187396	2005 UU_{516}	—	October 25, 2005	Apache Point	A. C. Becker	·	2.1 km	MPC · JPL
187397	2005 UR_{522}	—	October 27, 2005	Apache Point	A. C. Becker	(5)	1.4 km	MPC · JPL
187398	2005 VN_{10}	—	November 2, 2005	Mount Lemmon	Mount Lemmon Survey	·	2.5 km	MPC · JPL
187399	2005 VB_{31}	—	November 4, 2005	Kitt Peak	Spacewatch	·	2.7 km	MPC · JPL
187400	2005 VA_{34}	—	November 2, 2005	Mount Lemmon	Mount Lemmon Survey	HYG	5.3 km	MPC · JPL

== 187401–187500 ==
back to top

Designation			Discovery			Properties		Ref
Permanent	Provisional	Named after	Date	Site	Discoverer(s)	Category	Diam.	Ref
187401	2005 VB_{34}	—	November 2, 2005	Mount Lemmon	Mount Lemmon Survey	·	3.6 km	MPC · JPL
187402	2005 VA_{38}	—	November 3, 2005	Mount Lemmon	Mount Lemmon Survey	·	4.5 km	MPC · JPL
187403	2005 VB_{38}	—	November 3, 2005	Mount Lemmon	Mount Lemmon Survey	HYG	3.7 km	MPC · JPL
187404	2005 VK_{43}	—	November 5, 2005	Mount Lemmon	Mount Lemmon Survey	·	3.3 km	MPC · JPL
187405	2005 VL_{46}	—	November 4, 2005	Mount Lemmon	Mount Lemmon Survey	·	4.2 km	MPC · JPL
187406	2005 VJ_{49}	—	November 1, 2005	Socorro	LINEAR	·	5.2 km	MPC · JPL
187407	2005 VG_{53}	—	November 3, 2005	Mount Lemmon	Mount Lemmon Survey	EOS	3.2 km	MPC · JPL
187408	2005 VR_{56}	—	November 4, 2005	Mount Lemmon	Mount Lemmon Survey	·	2.0 km	MPC · JPL
187409	2005 VE_{58}	—	November 4, 2005	Mount Lemmon	Mount Lemmon Survey	·	4.1 km	MPC · JPL
187410 Anitabrockie	2005 VT_{60}	Anitabrockie	November 5, 2005	Mount Lemmon	Mount Lemmon Survey	EOS	3.2 km	MPC · JPL
187411	2005 VD_{65}	—	November 1, 2005	Mount Lemmon	Mount Lemmon Survey	KOR	2.1 km	MPC · JPL
187412	2005 VM_{70}	—	November 1, 2005	Mount Lemmon	Mount Lemmon Survey	·	2.0 km	MPC · JPL
187413	2005 VM_{72}	—	November 1, 2005	Mount Lemmon	Mount Lemmon Survey	·	3.4 km	MPC · JPL
187414	2005 VA_{78}	—	November 6, 2005	Socorro	LINEAR	·	2.9 km	MPC · JPL
187415	2005 VB_{78}	—	November 6, 2005	Socorro	LINEAR	EUN	1.3 km	MPC · JPL
187416	2005 VV_{78}	—	November 6, 2005	Mount Lemmon	Mount Lemmon Survey	·	3.2 km	MPC · JPL
187417	2005 VJ_{79}	—	November 3, 2005	Mount Lemmon	Mount Lemmon Survey	·	2.3 km	MPC · JPL
187418	2005 VN_{80}	—	November 5, 2005	Kitt Peak	Spacewatch	·	2.1 km	MPC · JPL
187419	2005 VD_{87}	—	November 6, 2005	Kitt Peak	Spacewatch	KOR	1.8 km	MPC · JPL
187420	2005 VY_{103}	—	November 3, 2005	Kitt Peak	Spacewatch	KOR	2.0 km	MPC · JPL
187421	2005 VF_{111}	—	November 6, 2005	Mount Lemmon	Mount Lemmon Survey	·	4.4 km	MPC · JPL
187422	2005 VA_{112}	—	November 6, 2005	Mount Lemmon	Mount Lemmon Survey	·	3.2 km	MPC · JPL
187423	2005 VR_{114}	—	November 10, 2005	Campo Imperatore	CINEOS	3:2 · SHU	5.7 km	MPC · JPL
187424	2005 VL_{119}	—	November 15, 2005	Palomar	NEAT	PHO	3.9 km	MPC · JPL
187425	2005 VR_{123}	—	November 2, 2005	Catalina	CSS	·	4.1 km	MPC · JPL
187426	2005 WJ_{5}	—	November 20, 2005	Palomar	NEAT	·	3.5 km	MPC · JPL
187427	2005 WH_{6}	—	November 21, 2005	Catalina	CSS	·	4.0 km	MPC · JPL
187428	2005 WK_{6}	—	November 21, 2005	Catalina	CSS	·	2.2 km	MPC · JPL
187429	2005 WH_{11}	—	November 22, 2005	Kitt Peak	Spacewatch	THM	3.4 km	MPC · JPL
187430	2005 WO_{27}	—	November 21, 2005	Kitt Peak	Spacewatch	·	2.5 km	MPC · JPL
187431	2005 WV_{27}	—	November 21, 2005	Kitt Peak	Spacewatch	·	3.4 km	MPC · JPL
187432	2005 WF_{29}	—	November 21, 2005	Kitt Peak	Spacewatch	·	3.0 km	MPC · JPL
187433	2005 WG_{30}	—	November 21, 2005	Kitt Peak	Spacewatch	VER	4.0 km	MPC · JPL
187434	2005 WD_{38}	—	November 22, 2005	Kitt Peak	Spacewatch	·	4.3 km	MPC · JPL
187435	2005 WD_{53}	—	November 25, 2005	Mount Lemmon	Mount Lemmon Survey	·	3.4 km	MPC · JPL
187436	2005 WN_{57}	—	November 30, 2005	Kitt Peak	Spacewatch	L5	17 km	MPC · JPL
187437	2005 WQ_{62}	—	November 25, 2005	Catalina	CSS	·	3.5 km	MPC · JPL
187438	2005 WO_{65}	—	November 26, 2005	Mount Lemmon	Mount Lemmon Survey	·	5.2 km	MPC · JPL
187439	2005 WZ_{73}	—	November 26, 2005	Catalina	CSS	·	2.1 km	MPC · JPL
187440	2005 WG_{81}	—	November 26, 2005	Mount Lemmon	Mount Lemmon Survey	·	4.2 km	MPC · JPL
187441	2005 WM_{84}	—	November 26, 2005	Mount Lemmon	Mount Lemmon Survey	·	3.0 km	MPC · JPL
187442	2005 WF_{96}	—	November 26, 2005	Kitt Peak	Spacewatch	·	3.6 km	MPC · JPL
187443	2005 WO_{97}	—	November 26, 2005	Mount Lemmon	Mount Lemmon Survey	·	3.6 km	MPC · JPL
187444	2005 WQ_{102}	—	November 25, 2005	Catalina	CSS	·	3.1 km	MPC · JPL
187445	2005 WY_{107}	—	November 28, 2005	Kitt Peak	Spacewatch	·	2.1 km	MPC · JPL
187446	2005 WV_{115}	—	November 30, 2005	Anderson Mesa	LONEOS	CYB	6.5 km	MPC · JPL
187447 Johnmester	2005 WD_{117}	Johnmester	November 29, 2005	Goodricke-Pigott	Reddy, V.	·	3.4 km	MPC · JPL
187448	2005 WL_{120}	—	November 29, 2005	Kitt Peak	Spacewatch	·	4.7 km	MPC · JPL
187449	2005 WH_{132}	—	November 25, 2005	Mount Lemmon	Mount Lemmon Survey	·	2.9 km	MPC · JPL
187450	2005 WK_{155}	—	November 29, 2005	Palomar	NEAT	EOS	3.3 km	MPC · JPL
187451	2005 WO_{165}	—	November 29, 2005	Mount Lemmon	Mount Lemmon Survey	THM	4.3 km	MPC · JPL
187452	2005 WN_{179}	—	November 21, 2005	Anderson Mesa	LONEOS	NEM	3.4 km	MPC · JPL
187453	2005 WP_{191}	—	November 22, 2005	Catalina	CSS	EUN	2.5 km	MPC · JPL
187454	2005 WB_{192}	—	November 25, 2005	Catalina	CSS	CYB	7.9 km	MPC · JPL
187455	2005 WD_{193}	—	November 26, 2005	Catalina	CSS	EUN	2.0 km	MPC · JPL
187456	2005 XK_{5}	—	December 4, 2005	Kitt Peak	Spacewatch	L5	14 km	MPC · JPL
187457	2005 XA_{17}	—	December 1, 2005	Kitt Peak	Spacewatch	·	3.8 km	MPC · JPL
187458	2005 XT_{23}	—	December 2, 2005	Socorro	LINEAR	(5)	2.9 km	MPC · JPL
187459	2005 XO_{28}	—	December 1, 2005	Catalina	CSS	EOS	3.0 km	MPC · JPL
187460	2005 XE_{53}	—	December 4, 2005	Kitt Peak	Spacewatch	THM	2.8 km	MPC · JPL
187461	2005 XM_{65}	—	December 7, 2005	Gnosca	S. Sposetti	(1298)	4.9 km	MPC · JPL
187462	2005 XV_{70}	—	December 6, 2005	Kitt Peak	Spacewatch	·	5.8 km	MPC · JPL
187463	2005 XX_{106}	—	December 1, 2005	Kitt Peak	M. W. Buie	L5	10 km	MPC · JPL
187464	2005 YC_{10}	—	December 21, 2005	Kitt Peak	Spacewatch	·	2.5 km	MPC · JPL
187465	2005 YZ_{139}	—	December 28, 2005	Kitt Peak	Spacewatch	·	5.5 km	MPC · JPL
187466	2005 YR_{171}	—	December 22, 2005	Catalina	CSS	·	2.2 km	MPC · JPL
187467	2005 YS_{250}	—	December 28, 2005	Kitt Peak	Spacewatch	THM	3.5 km	MPC · JPL
187468	2006 AE_{24}	—	January 5, 2006	Socorro	LINEAR	EOS	2.9 km	MPC · JPL
187469	2006 BL_{53}	—	January 25, 2006	Kitt Peak	Spacewatch	L5	14 km	MPC · JPL
187470	2006 BH_{59}	—	January 23, 2006	Mount Lemmon	Mount Lemmon Survey	L5	10 km	MPC · JPL
187471	2006 BV_{72}	—	January 23, 2006	Kitt Peak	Spacewatch	L5	10 km	MPC · JPL
187472	2006 BP_{73}	—	January 23, 2006	Kitt Peak	Spacewatch	L5	9.9 km	MPC · JPL
187473	2006 BJ_{103}	—	January 23, 2006	Mount Lemmon	Mount Lemmon Survey	L5	8.1 km	MPC · JPL
187474	2006 BM_{116}	—	January 26, 2006	Kitt Peak	Spacewatch	L5	13 km	MPC · JPL
187475	2006 BV_{119}	—	January 26, 2006	Kitt Peak	Spacewatch	L5	18 km	MPC · JPL
187476	2006 BB_{213}	—	January 30, 2006	Bergisch Gladbach	W. Bickel	L5	20 km	MPC · JPL
187477	2006 BW_{232}	—	January 31, 2006	Kitt Peak	Spacewatch	3:2	6.8 km	MPC · JPL
187478	2006 CY_{29}	—	February 2, 2006	Kitt Peak	Spacewatch	L5	10 km	MPC · JPL
187479	2006 DA_{15}	—	February 20, 2006	Kitt Peak	Spacewatch	L5	14 km	MPC · JPL
187480	2006 QX_{39}	—	August 24, 2006	San Marcello	San Marcello	V	1.0 km	MPC · JPL
187481	2006 QU_{116}	—	August 27, 2006	Anderson Mesa	LONEOS	·	1.4 km	MPC · JPL
187482	2006 RY_{32}	—	September 15, 2006	Kitt Peak	Spacewatch	·	780 m	MPC · JPL
187483	2006 RO_{39}	—	September 12, 2006	Catalina	CSS	ERI	1.8 km	MPC · JPL
187484	2006 RK_{97}	—	September 15, 2006	Kitt Peak	Spacewatch	·	1.5 km	MPC · JPL
187485	2006 SL_{18}	—	September 17, 2006	Kitt Peak	Spacewatch	·	3.1 km	MPC · JPL
187486	2006 SE_{54}	—	September 16, 2006	Catalina	CSS	H	760 m	MPC · JPL
187487	2006 SM_{54}	—	September 17, 2006	Kitt Peak	Spacewatch	NYS	1.7 km	MPC · JPL
187488	2006 SZ_{185}	—	September 25, 2006	Mount Lemmon	Mount Lemmon Survey	·	1.2 km	MPC · JPL
187489	2006 SN_{206}	—	September 25, 2006	Mount Lemmon	Mount Lemmon Survey	V	840 m	MPC · JPL
187490	2006 SJ_{212}	—	September 26, 2006	Kitt Peak	Spacewatch	H	850 m	MPC · JPL
187491	2006 SU_{223}	—	September 25, 2006	Mount Lemmon	Mount Lemmon Survey	·	870 m	MPC · JPL
187492	2006 SP_{269}	—	September 26, 2006	Mount Lemmon	Mount Lemmon Survey	EUN	1.2 km	MPC · JPL
187493	2006 SQ_{275}	—	September 28, 2006	Bergisch Gladbach	W. Bickel	·	3.9 km	MPC · JPL
187494	2006 SP_{290}	—	September 25, 2006	Kitt Peak	Spacewatch	(2076)	1.2 km	MPC · JPL
187495	2006 SN_{293}	—	September 25, 2006	Kitt Peak	Spacewatch	·	770 m	MPC · JPL
187496	2006 SP_{308}	—	September 27, 2006	Kitt Peak	Spacewatch	·	1.9 km	MPC · JPL
187497	2006 SK_{320}	—	September 27, 2006	Kitt Peak	Spacewatch	NYS	1.4 km	MPC · JPL
187498	2006 SQ_{326}	—	September 27, 2006	Kitt Peak	Spacewatch	NYS	1.5 km	MPC · JPL
187499	2006 SZ_{348}	—	September 28, 2006	Kitt Peak	Spacewatch	·	1.2 km	MPC · JPL
187500	2006 SX_{352}	—	September 30, 2006	Catalina	CSS	·	1.1 km	MPC · JPL

== 187501–187600 ==
back to top

Designation			Discovery			Properties		Ref
Permanent	Provisional	Named after	Date	Site	Discoverer(s)	Category	Diam.	Ref
187501	2006 SY_{352}	—	September 30, 2006	Catalina	CSS	·	1.2 km	MPC · JPL
187502	2006 SG_{357}	—	September 30, 2006	Catalina	CSS	·	2.8 km	MPC · JPL
187503	2006 SQ_{364}	—	September 28, 2006	Mount Lemmon	Mount Lemmon Survey	·	3.8 km	MPC · JPL
187504	2006 SO_{365}	—	September 30, 2006	Mount Lemmon	Mount Lemmon Survey	·	1.3 km	MPC · JPL
187505	2006 SX_{394}	—	September 27, 2006	Mount Lemmon	Mount Lemmon Survey	·	1.1 km	MPC · JPL
187506	2006 TB_{17}	—	October 11, 2006	Kitt Peak	Spacewatch	·	2.0 km	MPC · JPL
187507	2006 TJ_{30}	—	October 12, 2006	Kitt Peak	Spacewatch	·	1.2 km	MPC · JPL
187508	2006 TB_{43}	—	October 12, 2006	Kitt Peak	Spacewatch	·	2.2 km	MPC · JPL
187509	2006 TT_{46}	—	October 12, 2006	Kitt Peak	Spacewatch	(883)	1.0 km	MPC · JPL
187510	2006 TU_{48}	—	October 12, 2006	Kitt Peak	Spacewatch	MAS	1.0 km	MPC · JPL
187511	2006 TE_{63}	—	October 10, 2006	Palomar	NEAT	AGN	1.6 km	MPC · JPL
187512	2006 TB_{77}	—	October 11, 2006	Palomar	NEAT	·	890 m	MPC · JPL
187513	2006 TG_{91}	—	October 13, 2006	Kitt Peak	Spacewatch	MAS	1.1 km	MPC · JPL
187514 Tainan	2006 TM_{94}	Tainan	October 15, 2006	Lulin Observatory	Lin, C.-S., Q. Ye	·	3.0 km	MPC · JPL
187515	2006 TL_{97}	—	October 13, 2006	Kitt Peak	Spacewatch	·	1.0 km	MPC · JPL
187516	2006 TH_{107}	—	October 15, 2006	Kitt Peak	Spacewatch	V	770 m	MPC · JPL
187517	2006 TA_{109}	—	October 2, 2006	Mount Lemmon	Mount Lemmon Survey	·	1.6 km	MPC · JPL
187518	2006 TD_{110}	—	October 13, 2006	Kitt Peak	Spacewatch	SUL	2.7 km	MPC · JPL
187519	2006 UR_{5}	—	October 16, 2006	Catalina	CSS	(5)	1.7 km	MPC · JPL
187520	2006 UJ_{8}	—	October 16, 2006	Catalina	CSS	·	1.6 km	MPC · JPL
187521	2006 UL_{11}	—	October 17, 2006	Mount Lemmon	Mount Lemmon Survey	·	1.2 km	MPC · JPL
187522	2006 UB_{12}	—	October 17, 2006	Mount Lemmon	Mount Lemmon Survey	BAP	1.2 km	MPC · JPL
187523	2006 UC_{12}	—	October 17, 2006	Mount Lemmon	Mount Lemmon Survey	·	1.4 km	MPC · JPL
187524	2006 UD_{34}	—	October 16, 2006	Kitt Peak	Spacewatch	·	1.4 km	MPC · JPL
187525	2006 UU_{36}	—	October 16, 2006	Kitt Peak	Spacewatch	·	740 m	MPC · JPL
187526	2006 UP_{40}	—	October 16, 2006	Kitt Peak	Spacewatch	·	1.1 km	MPC · JPL
187527	2006 US_{45}	—	October 16, 2006	Kitt Peak	Spacewatch	NYS	1.3 km	MPC · JPL
187528	2006 UM_{61}	—	October 19, 2006	Mount Lemmon	Mount Lemmon Survey	·	980 m	MPC · JPL
187529	2006 UQ_{61}	—	October 19, 2006	Catalina	CSS	EUN	1.8 km	MPC · JPL
187530	2006 UG_{62}	—	October 17, 2006	Mount Lemmon	Mount Lemmon Survey	·	1.9 km	MPC · JPL
187531 Omorichugakkou	2006 UM_{63}	Omorichugakkou	October 20, 2006	Mount Nyukasa Stn.	Japan Aerospace Exploration Agency	·	1.0 km	MPC · JPL
187532	2006 UX_{64}	—	October 23, 2006	Kitami	K. Endate	EUN	2.4 km	MPC · JPL
187533	2006 UQ_{80}	—	October 17, 2006	Mount Lemmon	Mount Lemmon Survey	·	1.1 km	MPC · JPL
187534	2006 UU_{86}	—	October 17, 2006	Mount Lemmon	Mount Lemmon Survey	·	1.3 km	MPC · JPL
187535	2006 UH_{87}	—	October 17, 2006	Mount Lemmon	Mount Lemmon Survey	·	2.6 km	MPC · JPL
187536	2006 UH_{89}	—	October 17, 2006	Kitt Peak	Spacewatch	·	2.3 km	MPC · JPL
187537	2006 UV_{93}	—	October 18, 2006	Kitt Peak	Spacewatch	·	1.2 km	MPC · JPL
187538	2006 UA_{98}	—	October 18, 2006	Kitt Peak	Spacewatch	·	790 m	MPC · JPL
187539	2006 UC_{98}	—	October 18, 2006	Kitt Peak	Spacewatch	·	1.1 km	MPC · JPL
187540	2006 UQ_{115}	—	October 19, 2006	Kitt Peak	Spacewatch	·	1.7 km	MPC · JPL
187541	2006 UX_{149}	—	October 20, 2006	Catalina	CSS	EUP	5.7 km	MPC · JPL
187542	2006 UC_{183}	—	October 17, 2006	Catalina	CSS	·	930 m	MPC · JPL
187543	2006 UV_{191}	—	October 19, 2006	Catalina	CSS	·	5.1 km	MPC · JPL
187544	2006 UP_{200}	—	October 21, 2006	Kitt Peak	Spacewatch	·	930 m	MPC · JPL
187545	2006 UA_{218}	—	October 30, 2006	Kitami	K. Endate	·	1.2 km	MPC · JPL
187546	2006 UV_{221}	—	October 17, 2006	Mount Lemmon	Mount Lemmon Survey	·	1.3 km	MPC · JPL
187547	2006 UG_{230}	—	October 21, 2006	Palomar	NEAT	·	3.8 km	MPC · JPL
187548	2006 UJ_{240}	—	October 23, 2006	Kitt Peak	Spacewatch	NYS	1.5 km	MPC · JPL
187549	2006 UX_{240}	—	October 23, 2006	Mount Lemmon	Mount Lemmon Survey	·	2.4 km	MPC · JPL
187550	2006 UW_{248}	—	October 27, 2006	Mount Lemmon	Mount Lemmon Survey	·	1.3 km	MPC · JPL
187551	2006 UX_{255}	—	October 27, 2006	Mount Lemmon	Mount Lemmon Survey	·	2.4 km	MPC · JPL
187552	2006 UB_{273}	—	October 27, 2006	Kitt Peak	Spacewatch	V	800 m	MPC · JPL
187553	2006 VG_{12}	—	November 11, 2006	Mount Lemmon	Mount Lemmon Survey	·	1.6 km	MPC · JPL
187554	2006 VT_{12}	—	November 11, 2006	Goodricke-Pigott	R. A. Tucker	·	1.0 km	MPC · JPL
187555	2006 VJ_{15}	—	November 9, 2006	Kitt Peak	Spacewatch	NYS	1.3 km	MPC · JPL
187556	2006 VZ_{22}	—	November 10, 2006	Kitt Peak	Spacewatch	·	1.5 km	MPC · JPL
187557	2006 VO_{24}	—	November 10, 2006	Kitt Peak	Spacewatch	V	920 m	MPC · JPL
187558	2006 VK_{50}	—	November 10, 2006	Kitt Peak	Spacewatch	·	930 m	MPC · JPL
187559	2006 VV_{51}	—	November 10, 2006	Altschwendt	W. Ries	·	1.0 km	MPC · JPL
187560	2006 VO_{60}	—	November 11, 2006	Mount Lemmon	Mount Lemmon Survey	·	1.0 km	MPC · JPL
187561	2006 VV_{60}	—	November 11, 2006	Kitt Peak	Spacewatch	·	1.3 km	MPC · JPL
187562	2006 VR_{67}	—	November 11, 2006	Kitt Peak	Spacewatch	·	1.0 km	MPC · JPL
187563	2006 VJ_{73}	—	November 11, 2006	Kitt Peak	Spacewatch	·	3.1 km	MPC · JPL
187564	2006 VL_{79}	—	November 12, 2006	Mount Lemmon	Mount Lemmon Survey	·	800 m	MPC · JPL
187565	2006 VT_{79}	—	November 12, 2006	Mount Lemmon	Mount Lemmon Survey	·	980 m	MPC · JPL
187566	2006 VD_{89}	—	November 14, 2006	Kitt Peak	Spacewatch	·	1.4 km	MPC · JPL
187567	2006 VE_{94}	—	November 15, 2006	Catalina	CSS	·	2.6 km	MPC · JPL
187568	2006 VU_{99}	—	November 11, 2006	Catalina	CSS	V	1.0 km	MPC · JPL
187569	2006 VL_{107}	—	November 13, 2006	Kitt Peak	Spacewatch	·	1.9 km	MPC · JPL
187570	2006 VS_{123}	—	November 14, 2006	Kitt Peak	Spacewatch	·	1.3 km	MPC · JPL
187571	2006 VV_{123}	—	November 14, 2006	Kitt Peak	Spacewatch	·	2.4 km	MPC · JPL
187572	2006 VV_{142}	—	November 14, 2006	Socorro	LINEAR	·	4.1 km	MPC · JPL
187573	2006 VN_{147}	—	November 15, 2006	Catalina	CSS	·	2.3 km	MPC · JPL
187574	2006 VC_{153}	—	November 8, 2006	Palomar	NEAT	H	570 m	MPC · JPL
187575	2006 VW_{153}	—	November 8, 2006	Palomar	NEAT	·	990 m	MPC · JPL
187576	2006 WK_{9}	—	November 16, 2006	Kitt Peak	Spacewatch	·	1.1 km	MPC · JPL
187577	2006 WR_{20}	—	November 17, 2006	Mount Lemmon	Mount Lemmon Survey	·	2.6 km	MPC · JPL
187578	2006 WQ_{26}	—	November 18, 2006	Socorro	LINEAR	·	1.4 km	MPC · JPL
187579	2006 WA_{27}	—	November 18, 2006	Socorro	LINEAR	·	1.8 km	MPC · JPL
187580	2006 WJ_{35}	—	November 16, 2006	Kitt Peak	Spacewatch	·	1.9 km	MPC · JPL
187581	2006 WP_{39}	—	November 16, 2006	Kitt Peak	Spacewatch	·	1.4 km	MPC · JPL
187582	2006 WN_{46}	—	November 16, 2006	Kitt Peak	Spacewatch	·	2.7 km	MPC · JPL
187583	2006 WM_{51}	—	November 16, 2006	Kitt Peak	Spacewatch	·	1.6 km	MPC · JPL
187584	2006 WM_{64}	—	November 17, 2006	Mount Lemmon	Mount Lemmon Survey	·	880 m	MPC · JPL
187585	2006 WC_{82}	—	November 18, 2006	Kitt Peak	Spacewatch	·	2.0 km	MPC · JPL
187586	2006 WD_{88}	—	November 18, 2006	Mount Lemmon	Mount Lemmon Survey	·	1.9 km	MPC · JPL
187587	2006 WJ_{88}	—	November 18, 2006	Socorro	LINEAR	·	1.7 km	MPC · JPL
187588	2006 WV_{88}	—	November 18, 2006	Kitt Peak	Spacewatch	·	2.9 km	MPC · JPL
187589	2006 WH_{98}	—	November 19, 2006	Kitt Peak	Spacewatch	·	2.8 km	MPC · JPL
187590	2006 WY_{104}	—	November 19, 2006	Kitt Peak	Spacewatch	·	1.5 km	MPC · JPL
187591	2006 WA_{106}	—	November 19, 2006	Kitt Peak	Spacewatch	·	1.7 km	MPC · JPL
187592	2006 WN_{115}	—	November 20, 2006	Kitt Peak	Spacewatch	·	2.1 km	MPC · JPL
187593	2006 WY_{117}	—	November 20, 2006	Mount Lemmon	Mount Lemmon Survey	KOR	1.7 km	MPC · JPL
187594	2006 WA_{128}	—	November 24, 2006	Nyukasa	Japan Aerospace Exploration Agency	·	1.6 km	MPC · JPL
187595	2006 WE_{128}	—	November 24, 2006	Nyukasa	Japan Aerospace Exploration Agency	·	2.0 km	MPC · JPL
187596	2006 WG_{149}	—	November 20, 2006	Kitt Peak	Spacewatch	V	960 m	MPC · JPL
187597	2006 WW_{182}	—	November 24, 2006	Kitt Peak	Spacewatch	V	990 m	MPC · JPL
187598	2006 WZ_{190}	—	November 25, 2006	Catalina	CSS	·	2.0 km	MPC · JPL
187599	2006 XZ_{9}	—	December 9, 2006	Kitt Peak	Spacewatch	KOR	1.9 km	MPC · JPL
187600	2006 XG_{15}	—	December 10, 2006	Kitt Peak	Spacewatch	V	1.0 km	MPC · JPL

== 187601–187700 ==
back to top

Designation			Discovery			Properties		Ref
Permanent	Provisional	Named after	Date	Site	Discoverer(s)	Category	Diam.	Ref
187601	2006 XQ_{25}	—	December 12, 2006	Mount Lemmon	Mount Lemmon Survey	·	2.1 km	MPC · JPL
187602	2006 XY_{27}	—	December 13, 2006	Mount Lemmon	Mount Lemmon Survey	·	990 m	MPC · JPL
187603	2006 XK_{38}	—	December 11, 2006	Kitt Peak	Spacewatch	·	1.9 km	MPC · JPL
187604	2006 XN_{63}	—	December 6, 2006	Palomar	NEAT	·	2.3 km	MPC · JPL
187605	2006 XR_{65}	—	December 12, 2006	Palomar	NEAT	V	920 m	MPC · JPL
187606	2006 XB_{69}	—	December 12, 2006	Mount Lemmon	Mount Lemmon Survey	·	2.0 km	MPC · JPL
187607	2006 YB_{13}	—	December 21, 2006	Kitt Peak	Spacewatch	L5	19 km	MPC · JPL
187608	2006 YZ_{14}	—	December 16, 2006	Mount Lemmon	Mount Lemmon Survey	·	6.0 km	MPC · JPL
187609	2006 YX_{30}	—	December 21, 2006	Kitt Peak	Spacewatch	KOR	1.7 km	MPC · JPL
187610	2006 YK_{37}	—	December 21, 2006	Kitt Peak	Spacewatch	·	2.0 km	MPC · JPL
187611	2007 AJ_{1}	—	January 8, 2007	Mount Lemmon	Mount Lemmon Survey	·	2.6 km	MPC · JPL
187612	2007 AN_{6}	—	January 8, 2007	Kitt Peak	Spacewatch	·	6.1 km	MPC · JPL
187613	2007 AU_{13}	—	January 9, 2007	Mount Lemmon	Mount Lemmon Survey	HOF	2.8 km	MPC · JPL
187614	2007 AX_{14}	—	January 10, 2007	Mount Lemmon	Mount Lemmon Survey	MAS	1.1 km	MPC · JPL
187615	2007 AG_{16}	—	January 10, 2007	Kitt Peak	Spacewatch	TIR	3.6 km	MPC · JPL
187616	2007 AK_{17}	—	January 15, 2007	Catalina	CSS	·	6.2 km	MPC · JPL
187617	2007 AE_{18}	—	January 8, 2007	Catalina	CSS	·	4.4 km	MPC · JPL
187618	2007 AM_{22}	—	January 14, 2007	Nyukasa	Japan Aerospace Exploration Agency	·	3.7 km	MPC · JPL
187619	2007 AA_{23}	—	January 10, 2007	Mount Lemmon	Mount Lemmon Survey	·	3.1 km	MPC · JPL
187620	2007 AH_{26}	—	January 10, 2007	Kitt Peak	Spacewatch	·	3.6 km	MPC · JPL
187621	2007 AY_{26}	—	January 14, 2007	Socorro	LINEAR	·	4.1 km	MPC · JPL
187622	2007 BL_{9}	—	January 17, 2007	Palomar	NEAT	·	1.6 km	MPC · JPL
187623	2007 BM_{10}	—	January 17, 2007	Palomar	NEAT	·	3.0 km	MPC · JPL
187624	2007 BH_{17}	—	January 17, 2007	Palomar	NEAT	·	2.0 km	MPC · JPL
187625	2007 BF_{19}	—	January 21, 2007	Socorro	LINEAR	·	2.7 km	MPC · JPL
187626	2007 BB_{22}	—	January 24, 2007	Socorro	LINEAR	·	2.4 km	MPC · JPL
187627	2007 BE_{30}	—	January 24, 2007	Catalina	CSS	EOS	2.4 km	MPC · JPL
187628	2007 BX_{36}	—	January 24, 2007	Catalina	CSS	·	2.0 km	MPC · JPL
187629	2007 BY_{43}	—	January 24, 2007	Catalina	CSS	NYS	1.9 km	MPC · JPL
187630	2007 BQ_{50}	—	January 23, 2007	Anderson Mesa	LONEOS	LIX	5.4 km	MPC · JPL
187631	2007 BS_{63}	—	January 27, 2007	Mount Lemmon	Mount Lemmon Survey	·	2.4 km	MPC · JPL
187632	2007 BA_{66}	—	January 27, 2007	Mount Lemmon	Mount Lemmon Survey	·	3.3 km	MPC · JPL
187633	2007 BG_{66}	—	January 27, 2007	Mount Lemmon	Mount Lemmon Survey	EOS	2.9 km	MPC · JPL
187634	2007 CE	—	February 6, 2007	Kitt Peak	Spacewatch	·	3.1 km	MPC · JPL
187635	2007 CH_{2}	—	February 6, 2007	Kitt Peak	Spacewatch	·	2.5 km	MPC · JPL
187636 Chungyuan	2007 CF_{13}	Chungyuan	February 6, 2007	Lulin Observatory	Lin, H.-C., Q. Ye	·	3.4 km	MPC · JPL
187637	2007 CC_{25}	—	February 8, 2007	Catalina	CSS	·	4.0 km	MPC · JPL
187638 Greenewalt	2007 CH_{26}	Greenewalt	February 11, 2007	CBA-NOVAC	Skillman, D. R.	·	1.8 km	MPC · JPL
187639	2007 CV_{28}	—	February 6, 2007	Mount Lemmon	Mount Lemmon Survey	·	3.0 km	MPC · JPL
187640	2007 CF_{31}	—	February 6, 2007	Mount Lemmon	Mount Lemmon Survey	(5)	2.0 km	MPC · JPL
187641	2007 CV_{36}	—	February 6, 2007	Mount Lemmon	Mount Lemmon Survey	GEF	1.6 km	MPC · JPL
187642	2007 CP_{40}	—	February 7, 2007	Kitt Peak	Spacewatch	·	2.2 km	MPC · JPL
187643	2007 CU_{45}	—	February 8, 2007	Palomar	NEAT	(43176) ·	5.1 km	MPC · JPL
187644	2007 DA_{1}	—	February 16, 2007	Calvin-Rehoboth	Calvin College	HYG	4.2 km	MPC · JPL
187645	2007 DB_{1}	—	February 16, 2007	Calvin-Rehoboth	Calvin College	·	2.7 km	MPC · JPL
187646	2007 DB_{3}	—	February 16, 2007	Catalina	CSS	HIL · 3:2 · (6124)	7.5 km	MPC · JPL
187647	2007 DN_{16}	—	February 17, 2007	Kitt Peak	Spacewatch	·	4.8 km	MPC · JPL
187648	2007 DC_{24}	—	February 17, 2007	Kitt Peak	Spacewatch	·	4.1 km	MPC · JPL
187649	2007 DG_{77}	—	February 22, 2007	Catalina	CSS	·	6.3 km	MPC · JPL
187650	2007 DA_{78}	—	February 23, 2007	Catalina	CSS	·	2.1 km	MPC · JPL
187651	2007 DU_{91}	—	February 23, 2007	Mount Lemmon	Mount Lemmon Survey	·	3.0 km	MPC · JPL
187652	2007 EP_{19}	—	March 10, 2007	Mount Lemmon	Mount Lemmon Survey	·	4.1 km	MPC · JPL
187653	2007 EN_{31}	—	March 10, 2007	Kitt Peak	Spacewatch	·	4.7 km	MPC · JPL
187654	2007 EQ_{61}	—	March 10, 2007	Kitt Peak	Spacewatch	·	5.1 km	MPC · JPL
187655	2007 EZ_{103}	—	March 11, 2007	Mount Lemmon	Mount Lemmon Survey	L5	10 km	MPC · JPL
187656	2007 EM_{107}	—	March 11, 2007	Kitt Peak	Spacewatch	L5	9.9 km	MPC · JPL
187657	2007 ER_{148}	—	March 12, 2007	Mount Lemmon	Mount Lemmon Survey	L5	10 km	MPC · JPL
187658	2007 EV_{161}	—	March 15, 2007	Mount Lemmon	Mount Lemmon Survey	·	2.8 km	MPC · JPL
187659	2007 EN_{186}	—	March 15, 2007	Mount Lemmon	Mount Lemmon Survey	L5	10 km	MPC · JPL
187660	2007 JE_{8}	—	May 9, 2007	Mount Lemmon	Mount Lemmon Survey	HYG	4.2 km	MPC · JPL
187661	2007 JG_{43}	—	May 10, 2007	Palomar	M. E. Schwamb, M. E. Brown, D. L. Rabinowitz	centaur	80 km	MPC · JPL
187662	2007 JU_{44}	—	May 10, 2007	Mount Lemmon	Mount Lemmon Survey	·	3.3 km	MPC · JPL
187663	2007 WM_{20}	—	November 18, 2007	Mount Lemmon	Mount Lemmon Survey	·	1.1 km	MPC · JPL
187664	2007 WQ_{52}	—	November 20, 2007	Mount Lemmon	Mount Lemmon Survey	·	3.5 km	MPC · JPL
187665	2008 AY_{49}	—	January 11, 2008	Kitt Peak	Spacewatch	·	2.7 km	MPC · JPL
187666	2008 BM_{18}	—	January 30, 2008	Mount Lemmon	Mount Lemmon Survey	·	2.4 km	MPC · JPL
187667	2008 BZ_{38}	—	January 31, 2008	Mount Lemmon	Mount Lemmon Survey	NYS	1.6 km	MPC · JPL
187668	2008 BB_{39}	—	January 30, 2008	OAM	OAM	·	870 m	MPC · JPL
187669 Obastromca	2008 CK_{5}	Obastromca	February 5, 2008	OAM	OAM	·	3.4 km	MPC · JPL
187670	2008 CL_{18}	—	February 3, 2008	Kitt Peak	Spacewatch	·	2.3 km	MPC · JPL
187671	2008 CJ_{37}	—	February 2, 2008	Kitt Peak	Spacewatch	MAS	940 m	MPC · JPL
187672	2008 CT_{41}	—	February 2, 2008	Kitt Peak	Spacewatch	·	1.0 km	MPC · JPL
187673	2008 CO_{70}	—	February 9, 2008	RAS	Dillon, W. G.	·	750 m	MPC · JPL
187674	2008 CZ_{74}	—	February 10, 2008	Bergisch Gladbach	W. Bickel	·	800 m	MPC · JPL
187675	2008 CN_{85}	—	February 7, 2008	Kitt Peak	Spacewatch	AGN	1.7 km	MPC · JPL
187676	2008 CG_{91}	—	February 8, 2008	Kitt Peak	Spacewatch	·	2.6 km	MPC · JPL
187677	2008 CF_{142}	—	February 8, 2008	Kitt Peak	Spacewatch	·	1.7 km	MPC · JPL
187678	2008 CS_{156}	—	February 9, 2008	Kitt Peak	Spacewatch	·	2.3 km	MPC · JPL
187679 Folinsbee	2008 DC_{5}	Folinsbee	February 28, 2008	RAS	Lowe, A.	·	1.5 km	MPC · JPL
187680 Stelck	2008 DE_{5}	Stelck	February 28, 2008	RAS	Lowe, A.	·	1.1 km	MPC · JPL
187681	2008 DP_{11}	—	February 26, 2008	Kitt Peak	Spacewatch	·	5.2 km	MPC · JPL
187682	2008 DV_{12}	—	February 26, 2008	Kitt Peak	Spacewatch	·	2.4 km	MPC · JPL
187683	2008 DE_{15}	—	February 26, 2008	Mount Lemmon	Mount Lemmon Survey	·	2.3 km	MPC · JPL
187684	2008 DW_{16}	—	February 27, 2008	Mount Lemmon	Mount Lemmon Survey	·	1.6 km	MPC · JPL
187685	2008 DO_{21}	—	February 28, 2008	Kitt Peak	Spacewatch	·	780 m	MPC · JPL
187686	2008 DJ_{26}	—	February 26, 2008	Kitt Peak	Spacewatch	MAS	960 m	MPC · JPL
187687	2008 DV_{31}	—	February 27, 2008	Kitt Peak	Spacewatch	·	2.2 km	MPC · JPL
187688	2008 DR_{33}	—	February 27, 2008	Kitt Peak	Spacewatch	MAS	1.3 km	MPC · JPL
187689	2008 DS_{40}	—	February 27, 2008	Kitt Peak	Spacewatch	·	1.7 km	MPC · JPL
187690	2008 DT_{46}	—	February 28, 2008	Kitt Peak	Spacewatch	MAS	1.0 km	MPC · JPL
187691	2008 DT_{47}	—	February 28, 2008	Mount Lemmon	Mount Lemmon Survey	·	2.6 km	MPC · JPL
187692	2008 DM_{56}	—	February 29, 2008	Kitt Peak	Spacewatch	L5 · (17492)	10 km	MPC · JPL
187693	2008 DG_{58}	—	February 27, 2008	Socorro	LINEAR	EOS	2.4 km	MPC · JPL
187694	2008 DN_{59}	—	February 27, 2008	Mount Lemmon	Mount Lemmon Survey	slow	1.9 km	MPC · JPL
187695	2008 DP_{68}	—	February 29, 2008	Kitt Peak	Spacewatch	·	2.0 km	MPC · JPL
187696	2008 DU_{69}	—	February 29, 2008	Kitt Peak	Spacewatch	·	2.2 km	MPC · JPL
187697	2008 DZ_{73}	—	February 27, 2008	Mount Lemmon	Mount Lemmon Survey	·	3.2 km	MPC · JPL
187698	2008 DM_{79}	—	February 28, 2008	Catalina	CSS	·	4.4 km	MPC · JPL
187699	2008 EF_{1}	—	March 3, 2008	Chante-Perdrix	Chante-Perdrix	·	1.8 km	MPC · JPL
187700 Zagreb	2008 EG_{8}	Zagreb	March 2, 2008	OAM	OAM	·	2.1 km	MPC · JPL

== 187701–187800 ==
back to top

Designation			Discovery			Properties		Ref
Permanent	Provisional	Named after	Date	Site	Discoverer(s)	Category	Diam.	Ref
187701	2008 EU_{16}	—	March 1, 2008	Kitt Peak	Spacewatch	·	2.3 km	MPC · JPL
187702	2008 EM_{19}	—	March 2, 2008	Kitt Peak	Spacewatch	·	1.9 km	MPC · JPL
187703	2008 EC_{20}	—	March 2, 2008	Kitt Peak	Spacewatch	AGN	1.6 km	MPC · JPL
187704	2008 EC_{25}	—	March 3, 2008	Mount Lemmon	Mount Lemmon Survey	·	1.3 km	MPC · JPL
187705	2008 EV_{28}	—	March 4, 2008	Mount Lemmon	Mount Lemmon Survey	·	880 m	MPC · JPL
187706	2008 EU_{34}	—	March 2, 2008	Kitt Peak	Spacewatch	·	1.4 km	MPC · JPL
187707 Nandaxianlin	2008 EQ_{35}	Nandaxianlin	March 2, 2008	XuYi	PMO NEO Survey Program	·	1.6 km	MPC · JPL
187708	2008 EJ_{36}	—	March 3, 2008	Kitt Peak	Spacewatch	NYS	1.2 km	MPC · JPL
187709 Fengduan	2008 EW_{36}	Fengduan	March 3, 2008	XuYi	PMO NEO Survey Program	KOR	2.2 km	MPC · JPL
187710	2008 EM_{47}	—	March 5, 2008	Mount Lemmon	Mount Lemmon Survey	·	1.3 km	MPC · JPL
187711	2008 EU_{47}	—	March 5, 2008	Kitt Peak	Spacewatch	·	2.0 km	MPC · JPL
187712	2008 ET_{54}	—	March 6, 2008	Kitt Peak	Spacewatch	NYS	1.4 km	MPC · JPL
187713	2008 ES_{56}	—	March 7, 2008	Catalina	CSS	·	2.4 km	MPC · JPL
187714	2008 EU_{76}	—	March 7, 2008	Kitt Peak	Spacewatch	·	1.5 km	MPC · JPL
187715	2008 EZ_{77}	—	March 7, 2008	Kitt Peak	Spacewatch	·	3.0 km	MPC · JPL
187716	2008 ED_{81}	—	March 10, 2008	Kitt Peak	Spacewatch	·	1.4 km	MPC · JPL
187717	2008 ED_{82}	—	March 5, 2008	Socorro	LINEAR	NYS	1.3 km	MPC · JPL
187718	2008 EB_{83}	—	March 8, 2008	Socorro	LINEAR	·	4.3 km	MPC · JPL
187719	2008 EG_{83}	—	March 8, 2008	Socorro	LINEAR	EOS ·	6.5 km	MPC · JPL
187720	2008 EX_{85}	—	March 7, 2008	Catalina	CSS	·	3.2 km	MPC · JPL
187721	2008 EJ_{123}	—	March 9, 2008	Kitt Peak	Spacewatch	·	3.3 km	MPC · JPL
187722	2008 EN_{136}	—	March 11, 2008	Kitt Peak	Spacewatch	·	860 m	MPC · JPL
187723	2008 EN_{146}	—	March 5, 2008	Mount Lemmon	Mount Lemmon Survey	·	1.7 km	MPC · JPL
187724	2008 FC_{38}	—	March 28, 2008	Kitt Peak	Spacewatch	L5	15 km	MPC · JPL
187725	2008 FV_{40}	—	March 28, 2008	Kitt Peak	Spacewatch	·	1.7 km	MPC · JPL
187726	2008 FX_{52}	—	March 28, 2008	Mount Lemmon	Mount Lemmon Survey	NYS	1.3 km	MPC · JPL
187727	2008 FW_{55}	—	March 28, 2008	Mount Lemmon	Mount Lemmon Survey	·	1.4 km	MPC · JPL
187728	2008 FR_{58}	—	March 28, 2008	Mount Lemmon	Mount Lemmon Survey	THM	2.7 km	MPC · JPL
187729	2008 FO_{61}	—	March 30, 2008	Catalina	CSS	·	6.6 km	MPC · JPL
187730	2008 FX_{66}	—	March 28, 2008	Kitt Peak	Spacewatch	THM	2.9 km	MPC · JPL
187731	2008 FH_{76}	—	March 31, 2008	Catalina	CSS	·	3.5 km	MPC · JPL
187732	2008 FM_{80}	—	March 27, 2008	Mount Lemmon	Mount Lemmon Survey	URS · fast	3.8 km	MPC · JPL
187733	2008 FW_{80}	—	March 27, 2008	Mount Lemmon	Mount Lemmon Survey	·	2.9 km	MPC · JPL
187734	2008 FF_{104}	—	March 30, 2008	Kitt Peak	Spacewatch	·	1.7 km	MPC · JPL
187735	2008 FD_{106}	—	March 31, 2008	Kitt Peak	Spacewatch	·	1.7 km	MPC · JPL
187736	2008 FA_{114}	—	March 31, 2008	Kitt Peak	Spacewatch	·	1.1 km	MPC · JPL
187737	2153 P-L	—	September 24, 1960	Palomar	C. J. van Houten, I. van Houten-Groeneveld, T. Gehrels	·	760 m	MPC · JPL
187738	5031 P-L	—	October 17, 1960	Palomar	C. J. van Houten, I. van Houten-Groeneveld, T. Gehrels	·	1.3 km	MPC · JPL
187739	1168 T-1	—	March 25, 1971	Palomar	C. J. van Houten, I. van Houten-Groeneveld, T. Gehrels	·	3.0 km	MPC · JPL
187740	1224 T-2	—	September 29, 1973	Palomar	C. J. van Houten, I. van Houten-Groeneveld, T. Gehrels	·	1.7 km	MPC · JPL
187741	2100 T-3	—	October 16, 1977	Palomar	C. J. van Houten, I. van Houten-Groeneveld, T. Gehrels	HNS	1.5 km	MPC · JPL
187742	2351 T-3	—	October 16, 1977	Palomar	C. J. van Houten, I. van Houten-Groeneveld, T. Gehrels	V	1.0 km	MPC · JPL
187743	3562 T-3	—	October 16, 1977	Palomar	C. J. van Houten, I. van Houten-Groeneveld, T. Gehrels	HOF	3.7 km	MPC · JPL
187744	4085 T-3	—	October 16, 1977	Palomar	C. J. van Houten, I. van Houten-Groeneveld, T. Gehrels	·	1.2 km	MPC · JPL
187745	5137 T-3	—	October 16, 1977	Palomar	C. J. van Houten, I. van Houten-Groeneveld, T. Gehrels	·	3.2 km	MPC · JPL
187746	1976 DC	—	February 27, 1976	La Silla	R. M. West	·	1.7 km	MPC · JPL
187747	1993 FS_{21}	—	March 21, 1993	La Silla	UESAC	·	1.8 km	MPC · JPL
187748	1993 FW_{33}	—	March 19, 1993	La Silla	UESAC	NYS	1.7 km	MPC · JPL
187749	1993 FC_{61}	—	March 19, 1993	La Silla	UESAC	MAS	1.0 km	MPC · JPL
187750	1994 WB_{7}	—	November 28, 1994	Kitt Peak	Spacewatch	·	1.6 km	MPC · JPL
187751	1995 GG_{3}	—	April 2, 1995	Kitt Peak	Spacewatch	·	2.1 km	MPC · JPL
187752	1995 MF_{6}	—	June 24, 1995	Kitt Peak	Spacewatch	·	880 m	MPC · JPL
187753	1995 SF_{49}	—	September 22, 1995	Kitt Peak	Spacewatch	·	2.0 km	MPC · JPL
187754	1995 YV_{7}	—	December 16, 1995	Kitt Peak	Spacewatch	·	2.8 km	MPC · JPL
187755	1996 HN_{17}	—	April 18, 1996	La Silla	E. W. Elst	L5	12 km	MPC · JPL
187756	1996 RX_{18}	—	September 15, 1996	Kitt Peak	Spacewatch	·	2.0 km	MPC · JPL
187757	1996 UH_{4}	—	October 29, 1996	Xinglong	SCAP	·	1.0 km	MPC · JPL
187758	1996 VU_{11}	—	November 4, 1996	Kitt Peak	Spacewatch	·	930 m	MPC · JPL
187759	1996 XD_{8}	—	December 1, 1996	Kitt Peak	Spacewatch	WIT	1.4 km	MPC · JPL
187760	1997 BD_{6}	—	January 31, 1997	Kitt Peak	Spacewatch	·	2.0 km	MPC · JPL
187761	1997 NX_{4}	—	July 8, 1997	Caussols	ODAS	·	5.4 km	MPC · JPL
187762	1997 WQ_{5}	—	November 23, 1997	Kitt Peak	Spacewatch	·	1.3 km	MPC · JPL
187763	1998 BS_{17}	—	January 22, 1998	Kitt Peak	Spacewatch	·	860 m	MPC · JPL
187764	1998 BF_{20}	—	January 22, 1998	Kitt Peak	Spacewatch	HOF	3.7 km	MPC · JPL
187765	1998 BX_{38}	—	January 29, 1998	Kitt Peak	Spacewatch	·	2.4 km	MPC · JPL
187766	1998 DV_{17}	—	February 23, 1998	Kitt Peak	Spacewatch	AGN	1.4 km	MPC · JPL
187767	1998 QP_{4}	—	August 22, 1998	Xinglong	SCAP	·	4.6 km	MPC · JPL
187768	1998 QM_{72}	—	August 24, 1998	Socorro	LINEAR	·	5.5 km	MPC · JPL
187769	1998 RX_{29}	—	September 14, 1998	Socorro	LINEAR	·	4.4 km	MPC · JPL
187770	1998 RU_{41}	—	September 14, 1998	Socorro	LINEAR	·	3.7 km	MPC · JPL
187771	1998 RP_{52}	—	September 14, 1998	Socorro	LINEAR	·	1.2 km	MPC · JPL
187772	1998 RG_{70}	—	September 14, 1998	Socorro	LINEAR	NYS	1.1 km	MPC · JPL
187773	1998 RQ_{71}	—	September 14, 1998	Socorro	LINEAR	NYS	1.5 km	MPC · JPL
187774	1998 SR_{6}	—	September 20, 1998	Kitt Peak	Spacewatch	EOS	3.1 km	MPC · JPL
187775	1998 SQ_{21}	—	September 21, 1998	Kitt Peak	Spacewatch	·	1.7 km	MPC · JPL
187776	1998 SH_{55}	—	September 16, 1998	Anderson Mesa	LONEOS	·	1.2 km	MPC · JPL
187777	1998 SZ_{70}	—	September 21, 1998	La Silla	E. W. Elst	·	4.8 km	MPC · JPL
187778	1998 SJ_{88}	—	September 26, 1998	Socorro	LINEAR	·	1.0 km	MPC · JPL
187779	1998 SO_{88}	—	September 26, 1998	Socorro	LINEAR	V	1.0 km	MPC · JPL
187780	1998 SC_{109}	—	September 26, 1998	Socorro	LINEAR	·	2.4 km	MPC · JPL
187781	1998 SM_{112}	—	September 26, 1998	Socorro	LINEAR	·	1.9 km	MPC · JPL
187782	1998 SB_{120}	—	September 26, 1998	Socorro	LINEAR	·	1.4 km	MPC · JPL
187783	1998 SF_{120}	—	September 26, 1998	Socorro	LINEAR	·	5.8 km	MPC · JPL
187784	1998 SL_{148}	—	September 26, 1998	Socorro	LINEAR	NYS	1.8 km	MPC · JPL
187785	1998 SM_{159}	—	September 26, 1998	Socorro	LINEAR	V	1.0 km	MPC · JPL
187786	1998 SB_{165}	—	September 22, 1998	Anderson Mesa	LONEOS	·	1.6 km	MPC · JPL
187787	1998 SR_{168}	—	September 17, 1998	Anderson Mesa	LONEOS	·	5.0 km	MPC · JPL
187788	1998 SA_{169}	—	September 22, 1998	Anderson Mesa	LONEOS	V	1.1 km	MPC · JPL
187789	1998 UN_{31}	—	October 22, 1998	Xinglong	SCAP	H	760 m	MPC · JPL
187790	1998 UH_{36}	—	October 28, 1998	Socorro	LINEAR	HYG	5.0 km	MPC · JPL
187791	1998 VO_{1}	—	November 10, 1998	Socorro	LINEAR	H	1.0 km	MPC · JPL
187792	1999 AV_{3}	—	January 10, 1999	Oizumi	T. Kobayashi	(5)	2.4 km	MPC · JPL
187793	1999 BL_{10}	—	January 23, 1999	Višnjan Observatory	K. Korlević	(5)	2.0 km	MPC · JPL
187794	1999 CM_{28}	—	February 10, 1999	Socorro	LINEAR	·	2.3 km	MPC · JPL
187795	1999 CB_{97}	—	February 10, 1999	Socorro	LINEAR	·	2.5 km	MPC · JPL
187796	1999 CS_{132}	—	February 8, 1999	Kitt Peak	Spacewatch	·	1.8 km	MPC · JPL
187797	1999 CS_{133}	—	February 7, 1999	Kitt Peak	Spacewatch	·	4.6 km	MPC · JPL
187798	1999 FW_{15}	—	March 20, 1999	Kitt Peak	Spacewatch	·	2.7 km	MPC · JPL
187799	1999 FK_{16}	—	March 21, 1999	Kitt Peak	Spacewatch	T_{j} (2.88)	6.7 km	MPC · JPL
187800	1999 GZ_{13}	—	April 14, 1999	Kitt Peak	Spacewatch	·	2.2 km	MPC · JPL

== 187801–187900 ==
back to top

Designation			Discovery			Properties		Ref
Permanent	Provisional	Named after	Date	Site	Discoverer(s)	Category	Diam.	Ref
187801	1999 HZ_{5}	—	April 18, 1999	Kitt Peak	Spacewatch	·	3.0 km	MPC · JPL
187802	1999 JU_{2}	—	May 8, 1999	Xinglong	SCAP	JUN	1.5 km	MPC · JPL
187803	1999 JN_{8}	—	May 14, 1999	Socorro	LINEAR	·	3.2 km	MPC · JPL
187804	1999 OB_{2}	—	July 22, 1999	Socorro	LINEAR	·	7.2 km	MPC · JPL
187805 Edoardoedo	1999 RR_{32}	Edoardoedo	September 8, 1999	Bologna	San Vittore	·	900 m	MPC · JPL
187806	1999 RB_{51}	—	September 7, 1999	Socorro	LINEAR	·	2.9 km	MPC · JPL
187807	1999 RM_{189}	—	September 9, 1999	Socorro	LINEAR	·	3.3 km	MPC · JPL
187808	1999 RA_{214}	—	September 13, 1999	Kitt Peak	Spacewatch	·	1.4 km	MPC · JPL
187809	1999 TS_{16}	—	October 14, 1999	Ondřejov	L. Kotková	·	1.6 km	MPC · JPL
187810	1999 TC_{18}	—	October 10, 1999	Xinglong	SCAP	·	3.6 km	MPC · JPL
187811	1999 TX_{77}	—	October 10, 1999	Kitt Peak	Spacewatch	·	3.2 km	MPC · JPL
187812	1999 TU_{131}	—	October 6, 1999	Socorro	LINEAR	·	2.7 km	MPC · JPL
187813	1999 TR_{154}	—	October 7, 1999	Socorro	LINEAR	·	2.7 km	MPC · JPL
187814	1999 TL_{159}	—	October 9, 1999	Socorro	LINEAR	·	1.1 km	MPC · JPL
187815	1999 TH_{164}	—	October 10, 1999	Socorro	LINEAR	EOS	3.3 km	MPC · JPL
187816	1999 TL_{177}	—	October 10, 1999	Socorro	LINEAR	·	4.4 km	MPC · JPL
187817	1999 TP_{225}	—	October 2, 1999	Kitt Peak	Spacewatch	·	950 m	MPC · JPL
187818	1999 TA_{229}	—	October 3, 1999	Catalina	CSS	·	1.0 km	MPC · JPL
187819	1999 TD_{244}	—	October 7, 1999	Catalina	CSS	·	700 m	MPC · JPL
187820	1999 TP_{253}	—	October 10, 1999	Socorro	LINEAR	·	4.1 km	MPC · JPL
187821	1999 TS_{260}	—	October 11, 1999	Kitt Peak	Spacewatch	·	6.1 km	MPC · JPL
187822	1999 UH_{7}	—	October 30, 1999	Socorro	LINEAR	·	5.4 km	MPC · JPL
187823	1999 UK_{16}	—	October 29, 1999	Catalina	CSS	·	1.2 km	MPC · JPL
187824	1999 UH_{32}	—	October 31, 1999	Kitt Peak	Spacewatch	·	6.0 km	MPC · JPL
187825	1999 UP_{32}	—	October 31, 1999	Kitt Peak	Spacewatch	HYG	3.1 km	MPC · JPL
187826	1999 US_{32}	—	October 31, 1999	Kitt Peak	Spacewatch	·	3.0 km	MPC · JPL
187827	1999 UW_{33}	—	October 31, 1999	Kitt Peak	Spacewatch	·	1 km	MPC · JPL
187828	1999 VX_{21}	—	November 12, 1999	Višnjan Observatory	K. Korlević	·	1 km	MPC · JPL
187829	1999 VT_{58}	—	November 4, 1999	Socorro	LINEAR	·	3.2 km	MPC · JPL
187830	1999 VG_{61}	—	November 4, 1999	Socorro	LINEAR	·	950 m	MPC · JPL
187831	1999 VC_{95}	—	November 9, 1999	Socorro	LINEAR	·	3.2 km	MPC · JPL
187832	1999 VU_{95}	—	November 9, 1999	Socorro	LINEAR	·	4.4 km	MPC · JPL
187833	1999 VO_{105}	—	November 9, 1999	Socorro	LINEAR	·	5.3 km	MPC · JPL
187834	1999 VM_{121}	—	November 4, 1999	Kitt Peak	Spacewatch	·	3.6 km	MPC · JPL
187835	1999 VH_{134}	—	November 10, 1999	Kitt Peak	Spacewatch	EMA	5.8 km	MPC · JPL
187836	1999 VM_{147}	—	November 13, 1999	Socorro	LINEAR	·	3.4 km	MPC · JPL
187837	1999 VQ_{153}	—	November 11, 1999	Kitt Peak	Spacewatch	·	1.0 km	MPC · JPL
187838	1999 VT_{165}	—	November 14, 1999	Socorro	LINEAR	·	1.2 km	MPC · JPL
187839	1999 VD_{184}	—	November 15, 1999	Socorro	LINEAR	·	6.8 km	MPC · JPL
187840	1999 VF_{188}	—	November 15, 1999	Socorro	LINEAR	·	970 m	MPC · JPL
187841	1999 VF_{208}	—	November 9, 1999	Kitt Peak	Spacewatch	·	2.2 km	MPC · JPL
187842	1999 VJ_{225}	—	November 5, 1999	Socorro	LINEAR	·	4.3 km	MPC · JPL
187843	1999 XN_{50}	—	December 7, 1999	Socorro	LINEAR	·	5.3 km	MPC · JPL
187844	1999 XP_{53}	—	December 7, 1999	Socorro	LINEAR	·	970 m	MPC · JPL
187845	1999 XW_{109}	—	December 4, 1999	Catalina	CSS	·	3.8 km	MPC · JPL
187846	1999 XK_{135}	—	December 8, 1999	Socorro	LINEAR	·	1.3 km	MPC · JPL
187847	1999 XM_{138}	—	December 4, 1999	Kitt Peak	Spacewatch	EUP	5.6 km	MPC · JPL
187848	1999 XC_{246}	—	December 5, 1999	Socorro	LINEAR	·	2.2 km	MPC · JPL
187849	1999 XM_{248}	—	December 6, 1999	Socorro	LINEAR	·	1.2 km	MPC · JPL
187850	2000 AB_{48}	—	January 5, 2000	Socorro	LINEAR	·	1.7 km	MPC · JPL
187851	2000 AG_{151}	—	January 11, 2000	Prescott	P. G. Comba	·	1.2 km	MPC · JPL
187852	2000 AA_{170}	—	January 7, 2000	Socorro	LINEAR	·	1.0 km	MPC · JPL
187853	2000 AA_{225}	—	January 11, 2000	Kitt Peak	Spacewatch	·	5.9 km	MPC · JPL
187854	2000 AS_{253}	—	January 7, 2000	Kitt Peak	Spacewatch	MAS	720 m	MPC · JPL
187855	2000 GP_{4}	—	April 4, 2000	Socorro	LINEAR	H	790 m	MPC · JPL
187856	2000 GL_{155}	—	April 6, 2000	Anderson Mesa	LONEOS	KON	3.2 km	MPC · JPL
187857	2000 HA_{5}	—	April 27, 2000	Socorro	LINEAR	H	730 m	MPC · JPL
187858	2000 HA_{31}	—	April 28, 2000	Socorro	LINEAR	PHO	1.9 km	MPC · JPL
187859	2000 HL_{69}	—	April 25, 2000	Anderson Mesa	LONEOS	H	800 m	MPC · JPL
187860	2000 JM_{10}	—	May 7, 2000	Socorro	LINEAR	H	950 m	MPC · JPL
187861	2000 KG_{17}	—	May 28, 2000	Socorro	LINEAR	·	1.7 km	MPC · JPL
187862	2000 LW_{14}	—	June 7, 2000	Socorro	LINEAR	·	5.5 km	MPC · JPL
187863	2000 LW_{25}	—	June 11, 2000	Socorro	LINEAR	BAR	2.8 km	MPC · JPL
187864	2000 NE_{6}	—	July 3, 2000	Kitt Peak	Spacewatch	·	1.5 km	MPC · JPL
187865	2000 OG_{56}	—	July 29, 2000	Anderson Mesa	LONEOS	·	1.8 km	MPC · JPL
187866	2000 OV_{59}	—	July 29, 2000	Anderson Mesa	LONEOS	·	3.0 km	MPC · JPL
187867	2000 OJ_{60}	—	July 29, 2000	Anderson Mesa	LONEOS	·	2.1 km	MPC · JPL
187868	2000 PA_{10}	—	August 1, 2000	Socorro	LINEAR	·	1.6 km	MPC · JPL
187869	2000 QH_{51}	—	August 24, 2000	Socorro	LINEAR	·	3.3 km	MPC · JPL
187870	2000 QH_{62}	—	August 28, 2000	Socorro	LINEAR	·	2.6 km	MPC · JPL
187871	2000 QC_{64}	—	August 28, 2000	Socorro	LINEAR	·	5.1 km	MPC · JPL
187872	2000 QB_{70}	—	August 24, 2000	Socorro	LINEAR	·	3.8 km	MPC · JPL
187873	2000 QN_{78}	—	August 24, 2000	Socorro	LINEAR	MIS	3.5 km	MPC · JPL
187874	2000 QH_{91}	—	August 25, 2000	Socorro	LINEAR	·	2.0 km	MPC · JPL
187875	2000 QX_{91}	—	August 25, 2000	Socorro	LINEAR	·	2.4 km	MPC · JPL
187876	2000 QT_{104}	—	August 28, 2000	Socorro	LINEAR	slow	2.2 km	MPC · JPL
187877	2000 QG_{117}	—	August 25, 2000	Socorro	LINEAR	·	3.3 km	MPC · JPL
187878	2000 QL_{120}	—	August 25, 2000	Socorro	LINEAR	·	3.1 km	MPC · JPL
187879	2000 QQ_{169}	—	August 31, 2000	Socorro	LINEAR	·	2.3 km	MPC · JPL
187880	2000 QK_{176}	—	August 31, 2000	Socorro	LINEAR	·	2.9 km	MPC · JPL
187881	2000 QY_{211}	—	August 31, 2000	Socorro	LINEAR	AEO	1.5 km	MPC · JPL
187882	2000 QW_{230}	—	August 31, 2000	Kitt Peak	Spacewatch	·	1.7 km	MPC · JPL
187883	2000 RW	—	September 1, 2000	Socorro	LINEAR	·	1.7 km	MPC · JPL
187884	2000 RS_{42}	—	September 3, 2000	Socorro	LINEAR	·	2.7 km	MPC · JPL
187885	2000 RS_{53}	—	September 7, 2000	Bisei SG Center	BATTeRS	·	3.6 km	MPC · JPL
187886	2000 RV_{53}	—	September 7, 2000	Socorro	LINEAR	(1547)	4.4 km	MPC · JPL
187887	2000 RW_{64}	—	September 1, 2000	Socorro	LINEAR	·	2.7 km	MPC · JPL
187888	2000 RV_{73}	—	September 2, 2000	Socorro	LINEAR	·	3.7 km	MPC · JPL
187889	2000 SV_{5}	—	September 22, 2000	Socorro	LINEAR	·	2.2 km	MPC · JPL
187890	2000 SW_{41}	—	September 24, 2000	Socorro	LINEAR	·	2.8 km	MPC · JPL
187891	2000 ST_{46}	—	September 23, 2000	Socorro	LINEAR	·	3.6 km	MPC · JPL
187892	2000 SD_{59}	—	September 24, 2000	Socorro	LINEAR	·	3.9 km	MPC · JPL
187893	2000 SF_{85}	—	September 24, 2000	Socorro	LINEAR	·	2.2 km	MPC · JPL
187894	2000 SF_{142}	—	September 23, 2000	Socorro	LINEAR	·	3.8 km	MPC · JPL
187895	2000 SJ_{165}	—	September 23, 2000	Socorro	LINEAR	·	4.1 km	MPC · JPL
187896	2000 SJ_{189}	—	September 22, 2000	Haleakala	NEAT	·	3.7 km	MPC · JPL
187897	2000 SM_{198}	—	September 24, 2000	Socorro	LINEAR	·	3.3 km	MPC · JPL
187898	2000 ST_{213}	—	September 25, 2000	Socorro	LINEAR	·	3.3 km	MPC · JPL
187899	2000 SU_{261}	—	September 24, 2000	Socorro	LINEAR	·	2.4 km	MPC · JPL
187900	2000 SR_{265}	—	September 26, 2000	Socorro	LINEAR	·	2.8 km	MPC · JPL

== 187901–188000 ==
back to top

Designation			Discovery			Properties		Ref
Permanent	Provisional	Named after	Date	Site	Discoverer(s)	Category	Diam.	Ref
187901	2000 SB_{317}	—	September 30, 2000	Socorro	LINEAR	EUN	2.2 km	MPC · JPL
187902	2000 SJ_{339}	—	September 25, 2000	Socorro	LINEAR	·	7.6 km	MPC · JPL
187903	2000 SN_{341}	—	September 24, 2000	Socorro	LINEAR	EUN	1.6 km	MPC · JPL
187904	2000 SM_{363}	—	September 22, 2000	Anderson Mesa	LONEOS	·	3.8 km	MPC · JPL
187905	2000 TR_{23}	—	October 1, 2000	Socorro	LINEAR	·	2.6 km	MPC · JPL
187906	2000 TZ_{49}	—	October 1, 2000	Socorro	LINEAR	·	3.0 km	MPC · JPL
187907	2000 UH_{37}	—	October 24, 2000	Socorro	LINEAR	·	2.0 km	MPC · JPL
187908	2000 UD_{62}	—	October 25, 2000	Socorro	LINEAR	·	2.5 km	MPC · JPL
187909	2000 UG_{65}	—	October 25, 2000	Socorro	LINEAR	·	3.2 km	MPC · JPL
187910	2000 UN_{70}	—	October 25, 2000	Socorro	LINEAR	·	1.8 km	MPC · JPL
187911	2000 UU_{84}	—	October 31, 2000	Socorro	LINEAR	·	4.7 km	MPC · JPL
187912	2000 VS_{38}	—	November 1, 2000	Kitt Peak	Spacewatch	·	4.5 km	MPC · JPL
187913	2000 VM_{39}	—	November 1, 2000	Socorro	LINEAR	·	3.3 km	MPC · JPL
187914	2000 VD_{43}	—	November 1, 2000	Socorro	LINEAR	·	2.0 km	MPC · JPL
187915	2000 VU_{54}	—	November 3, 2000	Socorro	LINEAR	·	9.2 km	MPC · JPL
187916	2000 VY_{57}	—	November 3, 2000	Socorro	LINEAR	·	4.1 km	MPC · JPL
187917	2000 WH_{9}	—	November 21, 2000	Eskridge	Farpoint	DOR	3.7 km	MPC · JPL
187918	2000 WD_{108}	—	November 20, 2000	Socorro	LINEAR	·	6.9 km	MPC · JPL
187919	2000 WR_{124}	—	November 20, 2000	Socorro	LINEAR	·	4.1 km	MPC · JPL
187920	2000 XF_{41}	—	December 5, 2000	Socorro	LINEAR	·	3.6 km	MPC · JPL
187921	2000 YT_{3}	—	December 18, 2000	Kitt Peak	Spacewatch	·	2.9 km	MPC · JPL
187922	2000 YD_{57}	—	December 30, 2000	Socorro	LINEAR	THM	4.2 km	MPC · JPL
187923	2000 YF_{97}	—	December 30, 2000	Socorro	LINEAR	·	6.3 km	MPC · JPL
187924	2000 YA_{100}	—	December 30, 2000	Socorro	LINEAR	·	990 m	MPC · JPL
187925	2001 AN_{51}	—	January 15, 2001	Kitt Peak	Spacewatch	·	3.0 km	MPC · JPL
187926	2001 BH_{31}	—	January 20, 2001	Socorro	LINEAR	·	1.3 km	MPC · JPL
187927	2001 BK_{39}	—	January 21, 2001	Kitt Peak	Spacewatch	·	2.9 km	MPC · JPL
187928	2001 CT_{15}	—	February 1, 2001	Socorro	LINEAR	·	1.1 km	MPC · JPL
187929	2001 CD_{24}	—	February 1, 2001	Anderson Mesa	LONEOS	EOS	3.5 km	MPC · JPL
187930	2001 DY_{43}	—	February 19, 2001	Socorro	LINEAR	·	6.2 km	MPC · JPL
187931	2001 DN_{107}	—	February 20, 2001	Socorro	LINEAR	·	1.2 km	MPC · JPL
187932	2001 EX_{23}	—	March 15, 2001	Haleakala	NEAT	·	1.2 km	MPC · JPL
187933	2001 ES_{27}	—	March 2, 2001	Anderson Mesa	LONEOS	·	1.1 km	MPC · JPL
187934	2001 FU_{17}	—	March 19, 2001	Anderson Mesa	LONEOS	·	1.2 km	MPC · JPL
187935	2001 FO_{88}	—	March 26, 2001	Kitt Peak	Spacewatch	·	910 m	MPC · JPL
187936	2001 FL_{124}	—	March 27, 2001	Anderson Mesa	LONEOS	·	1.3 km	MPC · JPL
187937	2001 FW_{131}	—	March 20, 2001	Haleakala	NEAT	·	780 m	MPC · JPL
187938	2001 FM_{149}	—	March 24, 2001	Anderson Mesa	LONEOS	·	1.2 km	MPC · JPL
187939	2001 FP_{156}	—	March 26, 2001	Haleakala	NEAT	·	1.2 km	MPC · JPL
187940	2001 GG_{1}	—	April 14, 2001	Kitt Peak	Spacewatch	·	850 m	MPC · JPL
187941	2001 GU_{3}	—	April 15, 2001	Socorro	LINEAR	(2076)	1.2 km	MPC · JPL
187942	2001 KF_{3}	—	May 17, 2001	Socorro	LINEAR	·	1.3 km	MPC · JPL
187943	2001 KO_{33}	—	May 18, 2001	Socorro	LINEAR	·	1.2 km	MPC · JPL
187944	2001 KU_{37}	—	May 22, 2001	Socorro	LINEAR	·	1.6 km	MPC · JPL
187945	2001 KJ_{43}	—	May 22, 2001	Socorro	LINEAR	fast	1.3 km	MPC · JPL
187946	2001 KC_{66}	—	May 22, 2001	Anderson Mesa	LONEOS	·	1.0 km	MPC · JPL
187947	2001 KM_{67}	—	May 25, 2001	Kitt Peak	Spacewatch	·	1.6 km	MPC · JPL
187948	2001 KV_{70}	—	May 24, 2001	Anderson Mesa	LONEOS	·	1.6 km	MPC · JPL
187949	2001 KX_{74}	—	May 27, 2001	Haleakala	NEAT	(2076)	1.1 km	MPC · JPL
187950	2001 MO_{11}	—	June 19, 2001	Haleakala	NEAT	·	2.3 km	MPC · JPL
187951	2001 NL	—	July 9, 2001	Palomar	NEAT	·	1.9 km	MPC · JPL
187952	2001 OL_{2}	—	July 16, 2001	Anderson Mesa	LONEOS	PHO	1.3 km	MPC · JPL
187953	2001 OB_{8}	—	July 17, 2001	Anderson Mesa	LONEOS	·	3.1 km	MPC · JPL
187954	2001 OV_{9}	—	July 18, 2001	Palomar	NEAT	MAS	920 m	MPC · JPL
187955	2001 OV_{33}	—	July 19, 2001	Palomar	NEAT	·	3.2 km	MPC · JPL
187956	2001 OA_{49}	—	July 16, 2001	Haleakala	NEAT	·	3.2 km	MPC · JPL
187957	2001 OA_{57}	—	July 16, 2001	Anderson Mesa	LONEOS	NYS	1.8 km	MPC · JPL
187958	2001 OR_{66}	—	July 23, 2001	Palomar	NEAT	HNS	1.9 km	MPC · JPL
187959	2001 OW_{66}	—	July 23, 2001	Haleakala	NEAT	MAS	1.1 km	MPC · JPL
187960	2001 PM	—	August 5, 2001	Palomar	NEAT	·	1.1 km	MPC · JPL
187961	2001 PL_{2}	—	August 3, 2001	Haleakala	NEAT	V	1.2 km	MPC · JPL
187962	2001 PB_{36}	—	August 11, 2001	Palomar	NEAT	·	1.4 km	MPC · JPL
187963	2001 PK_{36}	—	August 11, 2001	Palomar	NEAT	·	4.4 km	MPC · JPL
187964	2001 PM_{51}	—	August 15, 2001	Haleakala	NEAT	·	2.7 km	MPC · JPL
187965	2001 QU_{36}	—	August 16, 2001	Socorro	LINEAR	·	1.5 km	MPC · JPL
187966	2001 QQ_{37}	—	August 16, 2001	Socorro	LINEAR	NYS	1.5 km	MPC · JPL
187967	2001 QA_{41}	—	August 16, 2001	Socorro	LINEAR	MAS	890 m	MPC · JPL
187968	2001 QC_{42}	—	August 16, 2001	Socorro	LINEAR	·	1.5 km	MPC · JPL
187969	2001 QS_{59}	—	August 18, 2001	Socorro	LINEAR	·	1.8 km	MPC · JPL
187970	2001 QP_{66}	—	August 17, 2001	Socorro	LINEAR	·	2.0 km	MPC · JPL
187971	2001 QB_{85}	—	August 19, 2001	Socorro	LINEAR	·	1.6 km	MPC · JPL
187972	2001 QL_{103}	—	August 19, 2001	Socorro	LINEAR	·	1.9 km	MPC · JPL
187973	2001 QP_{112}	—	August 25, 2001	Socorro	LINEAR	·	1.8 km	MPC · JPL
187974	2001 QV_{118}	—	August 17, 2001	Socorro	LINEAR	·	1.7 km	MPC · JPL
187975	2001 QQ_{155}	—	August 23, 2001	Anderson Mesa	LONEOS	·	1.9 km	MPC · JPL
187976	2001 QK_{169}	—	August 26, 2001	Haleakala	NEAT	·	1.7 km	MPC · JPL
187977	2001 QX_{205}	—	August 23, 2001	Anderson Mesa	LONEOS	NYS	1.3 km	MPC · JPL
187978	2001 QT_{218}	—	August 23, 2001	Anderson Mesa	LONEOS	PHO	1.4 km	MPC · JPL
187979	2001 QK_{234}	—	August 24, 2001	Socorro	LINEAR	·	1.7 km	MPC · JPL
187980	2001 QP_{288}	—	August 17, 2001	Palomar	NEAT	EUN	2.4 km	MPC · JPL
187981 Soluri	2001 QL_{307}	Soluri	August 19, 2001	Cerro Tololo	M. W. Buie	·	1.5 km	MPC · JPL
187982	2001 QR_{333}	—	August 26, 2001	Palomar	NEAT	EUN	1.9 km	MPC · JPL
187983	2001 RM_{4}	—	September 8, 2001	Socorro	LINEAR	·	1.9 km	MPC · JPL
187984	2001 RO_{8}	—	September 8, 2001	Socorro	LINEAR	·	1.5 km	MPC · JPL
187985	2001 RT_{37}	—	September 8, 2001	Socorro	LINEAR	·	1.1 km	MPC · JPL
187986	2001 RC_{39}	—	September 10, 2001	Socorro	LINEAR	·	1.9 km	MPC · JPL
187987	2001 RJ_{43}	—	September 12, 2001	Emerald Lane	L. Ball	·	1.4 km	MPC · JPL
187988	2001 RM_{79}	—	September 10, 2001	Socorro	LINEAR	·	2.1 km	MPC · JPL
187989	2001 RF_{101}	—	September 12, 2001	Socorro	LINEAR	NYS	1.5 km	MPC · JPL
187990	2001 RT_{123}	—	September 12, 2001	Socorro	LINEAR	·	2.3 km	MPC · JPL
187991	2001 RJ_{153}	—	September 12, 2001	Socorro	LINEAR	·	1.7 km	MPC · JPL
187992	2001 SA_{42}	—	September 16, 2001	Socorro	LINEAR	NYS	1.3 km	MPC · JPL
187993	2001 SZ_{55}	—	September 16, 2001	Socorro	LINEAR	ERI	2.7 km	MPC · JPL
187994	2001 SZ_{63}	—	September 17, 2001	Socorro	LINEAR	·	2.2 km	MPC · JPL
187995	2001 SO_{151}	—	September 17, 2001	Socorro	LINEAR	(194)	2.4 km	MPC · JPL
187996	2001 SU_{152}	—	September 17, 2001	Socorro	LINEAR	NYS	1.4 km	MPC · JPL
187997	2001 SC_{161}	—	September 17, 2001	Socorro	LINEAR	EUN	1.5 km	MPC · JPL
187998	2001 SO_{175}	—	September 16, 2001	Socorro	LINEAR	·	1.7 km	MPC · JPL
187999	2001 SY_{201}	—	September 19, 2001	Socorro	LINEAR	·	1.2 km	MPC · JPL
188000	2001 SR_{204}	—	September 19, 2001	Socorro	LINEAR	·	1.3 km	MPC · JPL

back to top

== See also ==
- Meanings of minor-planet names: 187001–188000
