= Meanings of minor-planet names: 187001–188000 =

As minor planet discoveries are confirmed, they are given a permanent number by the IAU's Minor Planet Center (MPC), and the discoverers can then submit names for them, following the IAU's naming conventions. The list below concerns those minor planets in the specified number-range that have received names, and explains the meanings of those names.

Official naming citations of newly named small Solar System bodies are approved and published in a bulletin by IAU's Working Group for Small Bodies Nomenclature (WGSBN). Before May 2021, citations were published in MPC's Minor Planet Circulars for many decades. Recent citations can also be found on the JPL Small-Body Database (SBDB). Until his death in 2016, German astronomer Lutz D. Schmadel compiled these citations into the Dictionary of Minor Planet Names (DMP) and regularly updated the collection.

Based on Paul Herget's The Names of the Minor Planets, Schmadel also researched the unclear origin of numerous asteroids, most of which had been named prior to World War II. This article incorporates text from this source, which is in the public domain: SBDB New namings may only be added to this list below after official publication as the preannouncement of names is condemned. The WGSBN publishes a comprehensive guideline for the naming rules of non-cometary small Solar System bodies.

== 187001–187100 ==
Named minor planet	Provisional	This minor planet was named for...	Ref · Catalog
There are no named minor planets in this number range

== 187101–187200 ==
back to top

Named minor planet	Provisional	This minor planet was named for...	Ref · Catalog
187123 Schorderet	2005 QO_{84}	Jean-Marcel Schorderet (born 1935), retired director and producer at the Schweizer Fernsehen of the Swiss Broadcasting Corporation	JPL · 187123
187125 Marxgyörgy	2005 QD_{87}	György Marx (1927–2002), a Hungarian physicist and astrophysicist.	JPL · 187125

== 187201–187300 ==
back to top

Named minor planet	Provisional	This minor planet was named for...	Ref · Catalog
187276 Meistas	2005 TM_{48}	Edmundas Meistas (born 1936), a Lithuanian astronomer and writer of popular science articles. Expert in stellar photometry, his research includes the structure of galaxies, interstellar extinction, and asteroseismology of white dwarfs.	JPL · 187276
187283 Jeffhopkins	2005 TC_{66}	Jeffrey Hopkins (born 1940), leading amateur photometrist	JPL · 187283

== 187301–187400 ==
back to top

Named minor planet	Provisional	This minor planet was named for...	Ref · Catalog
There are no named minor planets in this number range

== 187401–187500 ==
back to top

Named minor planet	Provisional	This minor planet was named for...	Ref · Catalog
187410 Anitabrockie	2005 VT_{60}	Anita Brockie (b. 1959), the memory care director and a nurse at a senior living facility in Tucson, Arizona.	IAU · 187410
187447 Johnmester	2005 WD_{117}	John Clark Mester (born 1961), an American physicist and former Associate Vice President for Research at the University of Arizona, who was involved in the development and launch of the Gravity Probe B, a satellite-based experiment to test two unverified predictions of general relativity.	IAU · 187447

== 187501–187600 ==
back to top

Named minor planet	Provisional	This minor planet was named for...	Ref · Catalog
187514 Tainan	2006 TM_{94}	Tainan is located in southern Taiwan and is the oldest and the fifth-largest city on the island	JPL · 187514
187531 Omorichugakkou	2006 UM_{63}	Omorichugakkou is the name of the junior high school in Suzaka, Nagano, Japan. Students discovered this minor planet during one of the commemoration events for the 60th anniversary of the school's founding.	JPL · 187531

== 187601–187700 ==
back to top

Named minor planet	Provisional	This minor planet was named for...	Ref · Catalog
187636 Chungyuan	2007 CF_{13}	The Chung Yuan Christian University (CYCU, formerly Chung Yuan Christian College of Science and Engineering) was established in October 1955 and upgraded to the status of a full university in August 1980. After five decades, CYCU has more than 120,000 alumni.	JPL · 187636
187638 Greenewalt	2007 CH_{26}	Crawford Greenewalt (1902–1993), an American chemical engineer who witnessed Fermi's first atomic chain reaction in 1942	JPL · 187638
187669 Obastromca	2008 CK_{5}	The Observatorio Astronómico de Mallorca was founded in 1991. More than 100 numbered minor planets have been discovered there, including the Atira-class (367943) Duende.	IAU · 187669
187679 Folinsbee	2008 DC_{5}	Robert E. Folinsbee (1917–2008), a Canadian geologist at the University of Alberta	JPL · 187679
187680 Stelck	2008 DE_{5}	Charles R. Stelck (1917–2016), Canadian paleontologist, stratigrapher and teacher	JPL · 187680
187700 Zagreb	2008 EG_{8}	The city of Zagreb, capital and the largest city of Croatia	JPL · 187700

== 187701–187800 ==
back to top

Named minor planet	Provisional	This minor planet was named for...	Ref · Catalog
187707 Nandaxianlin	2008 EQ_{35}	Nandaxianlin is the new campus of Nanjing University	JPL · 187707
187709 Fengduan	2008 EW_{36}	Feng Duan (1923–), Chinese physicist and member of the Chinese Academy of Sciences	JPL · 187709

== 187801–187900 ==
back to top

Named minor planet	Provisional	This minor planet was named for...	Ref · Catalog
187805 Edoardoedo	1999 RR_{32}	Edoardo Edo Colombini (b. 2026) is the third child of Elena and Alberto and the fifth grandson of Ermes Colombini, one of the co-discoverers of this minor planet at Osservatorio San Vittore.	IAU · 187805

== 187901–188000 ==
back to top

Named minor planet	Provisional	This minor planet was named for...	Ref · Catalog
187981 Soluri	2001 QL_{307}	Michael R. Soluri (born 1946), a documentary photographer who worked as the official project photographer for the New Horizons mission to Pluto	JPL · 187981

back to top

Preceded by 186,001–187,000	Meanings of minor-planet names List of minor planets: 187,001–188,000	Succeeded by 188,001–189,000
