= Cybele asteroids =

Dynamical group of asteroids

A view of proper elements of asteroids in the asteroid belt, showing inclination versus semi-major axis. Cybele asteroids are shown enlarged at the right in light blue, outward of the 2:1 Jupiter resonance. The core region of the asteroid belt is shown in white.

The Cybele asteroids (also known as the "Cybeles") are a dynamical group of asteroids, named after the asteroid 65 Cybele. Considered by some as the last outpost of an extended asteroid belt, the group consists of just over 2000 members and a few collisional families. Their orbit is defined by an osculating semi-major axis of 3.27 to 3.70 AU, with an eccentricity of less than 0.3, and an inclination less than 30°.

The dynamical Cybele group is located adjacent to the outermost asteroid belt, beyond the Hecuba gap – the 2:1 resonant zone with Jupiter, where the Griqua asteroids are located – and inside the orbital region of the Hilda asteroids (3:2 resonance), which are themselves followed by the Jupiter trojans (1:1 resonance) further out.

== Description ==
Three known asteroid families exist within the Cybele group: the Sylvia family (603), the Huberta family and the Ulla family (903). A potential fourth family is a small cluster with the parent body (45657) 2000 EK. A fifth family, named after 522 Helga, was identified in 2015.

The Cybele asteroids 87 Sylvia and 107 Camilla are triple systems with more than one satellite. Other large members include 121 Hermione, 76 Freia, 790 Pretoria, and 566 Stereoskopia.

The group is thought to have formed from the breakup of a larger object in the distant past. While most members are C- and X-type asteroids, NASA's Wide-field Infrared Survey Explorer also measured albedos of some Cybele asteroids that are typical for stony S-type asteroids.

== List ==
Total of 2034 Cybeles with osculating semi-major axis between 3.28 and 3.7 AU. Low numbered members of the collisional Sylvia (SYL) and smaller Ulla (ULA) families are also marked.

- 65 Cybele
- 76 Freia
- 87 Sylvia (SYL)
- 107 Camilla (SYL)
- 121 Hermione
- 168 Sibylla
- 225 Henrietta
- 229 Adelinda
- 260 Huberta
- 319 Leona
- 401 Ottilia
- 414 Liriope
- 420 Bertholda
- 466 Tisiphone
- 483 Seppina
- 522 Helga
- 528 Rezia
- 536 Merapi
- 566 Stereoskopia
- 570 Kythera
- 643 Scheherezade
- 692 Hippodamia
- 713 Luscinia
- 721 Tabora
- 733 Mocia
- 790 Pretoria
- 909 Ulla (ULA)
- 940 Kordula
- 1004 Belopolskya
- 1028 Lydina
- 1091 Spiraea
- 1154 Astronomia
- 1167 Dubiago
- 1177 Gonnessia
- 1266 Tone
- 1280 Baillauda
- 1295 Deflotte
- 1328 Devota
- 1373 Cincinnati
- 1390 Abastumani
- 1467 Mashona
- 1556 Wingolfia
- 1574 Meyer
- 1579 Herrick
- 1796 Riga
- 1841 Masaryk
- 1921 Pala
- 2196 Ellicott
- 2208 Pushkin
- 2266 Tchaikovsky
- 2311 El Leoncito
- 2634 James Bradley
- 2697 Albina
- 2702 Batrakov
- 2891 McGetchin
- 2932 Kempchinsky
- 2976 Lautaro (SYL)
- 3015 Candy
- 3024 Hainan
- 3092 Herodotus
- 3095 Omarkhayyam
- 3141 Buchar
- 3273 Drukar
- 3368 Duncombe
- 3396 Muazzez
- 3608 Kataev
- 3622 Ilinsky
- 3675 Kemstach
- 3727 Maxhell
- 3789 Zhongguo
- 3845 Neyachenko
- 4003 Schumann
- 4014 Heizman
- 4158 Santini
- 4169 Celsius
- 4177 Kohman
- 4236 Lidov
- 4423 Golden
- 4973 Showa
- 5164 Mullo
- 5201 Ferraz-Mello
- 5301 Novobranets
- 5362 Johnyoung
- 5370 Taranis
- 5495 Rumyantsev
- 5780 Lafontaine
- 5833 Peterson
- 5914 Kathywhaler (SYL)
- 6039 Parmenides
- 6057 Robbia
- (6103) 1993 HV
- 6574 Gvishiani
- 6924 Fukui
- 6996 Alvensleben
- (7466) 1989 VC_{2}
- 7501 Farra
- (7574) 1989 WO_{1}
- 7710 Ishibashi
- 8482 Wayneolm
- 8917 Tianjindaxue
- (8988) 1979 MA4
- 9398 Bidelman
- (9402) 1994 UN1
- 9522 Schlichting
- (9552) 1985 UY (SYL)
- 9767 Midsomer Norton
- 10257 Garecynthia
- 10379 Lake Placid
- 10653 Witsen
- (11188) 1998 KD_{50}
- 11440 Massironi (SYL)
- (11505) 1990 DW2
- (11589) 1994 WG
- (11616) 1996 BQ_{2}
- 12003 Hideosugai
- (12041) 1997 EQ_{25}
- (12949) 4290 T-1
- (12962) 4297 T-2
- 13096 Tigris
- (13429) 1999 VM_{35}
- (13445) 3063 P-L
- (13832) 1999 XR_{13}
- (13890) 1186 T-2
- 13963 Euphrates
- (14272) 2000 AZ_{234}
- (14330) 1981 EG_{21}
- (14560) 1997 WB_{33}
- (14766) 9594 P-L
- 14871 Pyramus
- 14994 Uppenkamp
- (15314) 1993 FL_{34}
- 15372 Agrigento
- (16882) 1998 BO13
- (16918) 1998 FF_{32}
- (17161) 1999 LQ_{13}
- 17427 Poe
- (17587) 1995 BD
- (17871) 1998 RD_{58}
- 18150 Lopez-Moreno
- (18958) 2000 QL_{128}
- (18959) 2000 QG_{129} (SYL)
- 19149 Boccaccio
- 19226 Peiresc
- (19279) 1995 YC_{4}
- (19285) 1996 CM9
- (19358) 1997 GO_{23}
- (19513) 1998 QN_{7}
- (19689) 1999 RX_{205} (SYL)
- 19694 Dunkelman
- 19917 Dazaifu
- 20664 Senec (SYL)
- (20718) 1999 XZ_{97}
- (21078) 1991 RR16
- (21573) 1998 RP_{70}
- (21867) 1999 TQ_{251}
- 22692 Carfrekahl
- (22720) 1998 SF_{49}
- (23025) 1999 WR_{9}
- (23028) 1999 XV_{3}
- (23577) 1995 DY_{8}
- (23782) 1998 QE_{12}
- (24361) 2000 AK_{120}
- (24550) 2001 DM_{71}
- (25771) 2000 CW_{25}
- (25792) 2000 CZ_{62}
- (25797) 2000 CG_{82}
- (25847) 2000 EV_{97} (SYL)
- 25851 Browning
- (25856) 2000 EZ_{170} (SYL)
- (26052) 3230 T-2
- (26166) 1995 QN_{3}
- (26553) 2000 DO_{75}
- (26561) 2000 EV_{37}
- (26607) 2000 FA_{33}
- (26645) 2000 JJ_{66}
- (26755) 2001 KT_{6}
- (26997) 1997 YJ_{5}
- (27189) 1999 CF_{51}
- (27359) 2000 DT_{106}
- (27558) 2000 JW_{55}
- (27559) 2000 JB_{66}
- 27719 Fast
- (27821) 1993 TU_{34}
- (28029) 1998 DW_{9}
- (28912) 2000 NL_{26} (SYL)
- (29071) 5048 T-3
- 29419 Mladkova
- (29538) 1998 BN_{16}
- (29966) 1999 JW_{103}
- (30479) 2000 OW_{37}
- (30517) 2001 LJ_{15} (SYL)
- (31094) 1997 CN28
- 31238 Kromeriz
- (31293) 1998 FP70
- (31822) 1999 SY_{4}
- (32185) 2000 ND_{23}
- (32332) 2000 QV_{69}
- (32345) 2000 QF_{99}
- (32394) 2000 QL_{210} (SYL)
- (32433) 2000 RF_{92}
- (32553) 2001 QC_{27}
- (33310) 1998 KF_{54}
- (33782) 1999 RW_{178}
- (33935) 2000 LH_{30}
- (34067) 2000 OA_{55}
- (34411) 2000 RR_{96} (SYL)
- (34513) 2000 SQ_{178}
- (34581) 2000 SC_{348}
- (34649) 2000 WB_{103}
- (34750) 2001 QB_{97}
- (34834) 2001 SF_{243}
- (34850) 2001 TL_{8} (SYL)
- (34880) 2001 UN_{45}
- (36249) 1999 VT_{178}
- (37012) 2000 TP_{51}
- (37170) 2000 WY_{26}
- (37199) 2000 WV_{92}
- (37291) 2001 AP_{26}
- (37338) 2001 RF_{93}
- (37528) 1975 SX
- (38395) 1999 RR_{193} (SYL)
- (38578) 1999 XS_{11}
- (38601) 1999 XK_{229} (SYL)
- (38984) 2000 UZ4
- (39018) 2000 UM53
- (39356) 2002 AK_{161}
- (40187) 1998 RR_{61}
- (41211) 1999 XB_{1}
- (41329) 1999 XM_{221}
- (41344) 2000 AR_{16}
- (41363) 2000 AA_{90} (SYL)
- (41993) 2000 YD_{38}
- (42068) 2000 YA_{133}
- (42172) 2001 CR_{17}
- (42313) 2001 VH97 (ULA)
- (42349) 2002 BH_{17}
- (42767) 1998 SJ_{150}
- (42809) 1999 JJ_{20}
- (42902) 1999 RM_{197}
- (43390) 2000 WF_{62}
- (43503) 2001 CK_{29}
- (43535) 2001 DE_{97}
- (44026) 1997 YD_{11}
- (44547) 1999 BC_{3}
- (44566) 1999 CK_{103}
- 45511 Anneblack
- (45536) 2000 CK_{27} (SYL)
- (45637) 2000 EW_{12}
- (45652) 2000 EK_{61}
- (45653) 2000 EL_{62} (SYL)
- (45709) 2000 FR_{36}
- (46305) 2001 OW_{71}
- (47112) 1999 CZ_{54}
- (47114) 1999 CP_{61}
- (47547) 2000 AM_{121}
- (47828) 2000 EV_{109}
- (48237) 2001 MJ_{5}
- (48634) 1995 SE_{44}
- (48837) 1998 AR6
- (49651) 1999 JR_{66}
- (50942) 2000 GR_{71}
- (51070) 2000 GO_{158}
- (51199) 2000 JA_{4}
- (51309) 2000 KN_{62}
- (51763) 2001 LD_{8}
- (51836) 2001 OH_{56}
- (51876) 2001 PU_{41}
- (52194) 1149 T-3 (SYL)
- (52700) 1998 FG_{62}
- (52706) 1998 FO_{77}
- (54533) 2000 QM_{38}
- (54547) 2000 QO_{71}
- (54567) 2000 QZ_{151}
- (54622) 2000 SH_{31}
- (54825) 2001 NE_{7} (SYL)
- (55192) 2001 RN_{2}
- (55483) 2001 UD_{23}
- (55740) 1989 YL2
- (56341) 1999 XS_{221} (SYL)
- (56881) 2000 QE_{122}
- (56974) 2000 SS_{142} (SYL)
- (56975) 2000 SP_{161}
- (56987) 2000 SR_{211}
- (57954) 2002 JA_{101}
- (58953) 1998 QC_{75} (SYL)
- (59888) 1999 RS_{128}
- (59903) 1999 RO_{148}
- (59973) 1999 RY_{252}
- (60042) 1999 TF102 (ULA)
- (60107) 1999 TY_{201}
- (60235) 1999 VO_{163} (SYL)
- (60266) 1999 XB_{25}
- (60934) 2000 JL_{51}
- (61102) 2000 LM_{30}
- (61820) 2000 QV_{191} (SYL)
- (62483) 2000 SG_{221} (SYL)
- (62726) 2000 TN_{55}
- (62744) 2000 UX_{1}
- (63050) 2000 WG_{96} (SYL)
- (63235) 2001 BV_{20}
- (63283) 2001 DA_{46}
- (63554) 2001 QA_{8}
- (63973) 2001 SS_{75}
- (64762) 2001 XD_{174}
- (65145) 2002 CG_{114}
- (65273) 2002 GN_{45}
- (65297) 2002 JB_{31}
- (65409) 2002 RM_{212}
- (65727) 1993 FY_{70}
- (67020) 1999 XS_{137} (SYL)
- (67095) 2000 AU_{67}
- (67156) 2000 AY_{197}
- (67169) 2000 AV_{241}
- (67218) 2000 DF_{62}
- (67226) 2000 DB_{102}
- (67244) 2000 EH_{58}
- (67485) 2000 RU_{14}
- (68497) 2001 UZ_{33}
- (68706) 2002 CX_{234}
- (68900) 2002 JC_{98}
- (68922) 2002 LW_{12}
- (69222) 4210 T-3
- (69999) 1998 XN
- (70003) 1998 XV_{12}
- (70032) 1999 CZ_{13}
- (71508) 2000 CL_{35}
- (71627) 2000 EY_{66}
- (71713) 2000 GN_{98}
- (71724) 2000 GB_{186} (SYL)
- (72594) 2001 FG_{6} (SYL)
- (73535) 2003 OB_{14}
- (73655) 1981 EL_{9}
- (73983) 1998 DS_{19}
- (73995) 1998 FQ_{25}
- (74487) 1999 CE_{105}
- (76586) 2000 GW_{141}
- (76672) 2000 HD_{56}
- (77735) 2001 OJ_{76}
- (77767) 2001 PZ_{62}
- (77814) 2001 QY_{146}
- (77815) 2001 QM_{157}
- (77837) 2001 QK_{267}
- (77900) 2001 TR_{139}
- (78419) 2002 QX_{39}
- (78692) 2002 TA_{167}
- (78713) 2002 TV_{192}
- (78725) 2002 TM_{230}
- (78814) 2003 PX_{3}
- (78884) 2003 SW_{2}
- (79482) 1998 EX_{12}
- (79514) 1998 KM_{26}
- (81914) 2000 NJ_{11}
- (81922) 2000 NV_{22}
- (82024) 2000 SB_{46}
- (82027) 2000 SJ_{72}
- (82042) 2000 SR_{203}
- (82496) 2001 OQ_{42}
- (83118) 2001 QC_{244} (SYL)
- (83345) 2001 RY_{140}
- (83452) 2001 SG_{62}
- (83477) 2001 SD_{82}
- (83738) 2001 TA_{126}
- (83923) 2001 VR_{16}
- (83943) 2001 WK_{14}
- (84365) 2002 TC_{112}
- (84575) 2002 VD_{16}
- (84873) 2003 BW_{55}
- (84905) 2003 UD_{98}
- (85036) 4203 P-L (ULA)
- (86275) 1999 TA_{320}
- (86343) 1999 XZ56
- (86367) 1999 XY_{223}
- (86371) 1999 XZ_{234} (SYL)
- (87375) 2000 QN_{55}
- (87789) 2000 SN_{120}
- (88028) 2000 UD_{83}
- 88071 Taniguchijiro
- (88129) 2000 WN_{152}
- (88205) 2000 YL_{115}
- (88935) 2001 TF_{32}
- (89175) 2001 UM_{57}
- (89885) 2002 CP_{228}
- (89947) 2002 GQ_{48}
- (90235) 2003 BF_{35}
- (90277) 2003 DS_{7} (SYL)
- (90458) 2004 CM_{11}
- (90572) 2004 GN_{17}
- (90688) 1981 ED_{30}
- (91738) 1999 TE_{174}
- (92118) 1999 XK_{81}
- (92184) 1999 XK_{204}
- (92262) 2000 BZ_{14} (SYL)
- (92265) 2000 BO_{22}
- (94230) 2001 BU_{63}
- (94246) 2001 CP_{15} (SYL)
- (94278) 2001 DT_{36} (SYL)
- (94301) 2001 EF_{8}
- (94308) 2001 FD_{15}
- (94324) 2001 FB_{127}
- (95240) 2002 CW_{47}
- (95318) 2002 CF_{107} (SYL)
- (95530) 2002 EF_{75}
- (95995) 2004 NC_{11}
- (96068) 4819 P-L
- (96177) 1984 BC
- (96607) 1999 AT_{30}
- (97560) 2000 DS_{76}
- (97568) 2000 DZ_{94}
- (97653) 2000 FH_{13}
- (97724) 2000 GN_{138}
- (98988) 2001 DY_{27}
- (99167) 2001 FX_{151}
- 99905 Jeffgrossman
- (100100) 1993 FB_{25}
- (100114) 1993 FQ_{82}
- (100720) 1998 BA_{28}
- (102034) 1999 RW_{107}
- (102165) 1999 RH_{220}
- (102167) 1999 RC_{223}
- (102218) 1999 TA_{6}
- (102559) 1999 UJ_{25}
- (102698) 1999 VL_{85} (ULA)
- (102915) 1999 XT_{23}
- (103027) 1999 XS_{112}
- (104336) 2000 FM_{12}
- (105203) 2000 OV_{41} (SYL)
- (105356) 2000 QF_{108}
- (105577) 2000 RP_{74} (SYL)
- (107181) 2001 BU_{25}
- (107690) 2001 FB_{14}
- (108578) 2001 MQ_{7}
- (108661) 2001 NP_{20}
- (108968) 2001 PE_{40}
- (109581) 2001 QO_{274}
- (109659) 2001 RF_{11}
- (109860) 2001 RW_{139}
- (110198) 2001 SV_{196}
- (110205) 2001 SA_{206}
- (110476) 2001 TJ_{56} (SYL)
- (110966) 2001 UO_{171} (SYL)
- (111029) 2001 VW_{19}
- (111461) 2001 XN_{259} (SYL)
- (111520) 2001 YM_{98}
- (111526) 2001 YC_{110} (SYL)
- (112452) 2002 OY_{8}
- (113267) 2002 RT_{150} (SYL)
- (113317) 2002 RL_{200} (SYL)
- (113667) 2002 TB_{91}
- (113748) 2002 TN_{164}
- (114007) 2002 UO_{38}
- (114433) 2003 AL_{7}
- (114552) 2003 BF_{38} (ULA)
- (114804) 2003 NS_{8}
- (115325) 2003 SQ_{220} (SYL)
- (115700) 2003 UO_{163} (SYL)
- (115808) 2003 UL_{238}
- (115842) 2003 UP_{262}
- (115843) 2003 UN_{264} (SYL)
- (115846) 2003 UA_{265}
- (115930) 2003 WH_{22}
- (116172) 2003 XE_{3}
- (116450) 2004 AW
- (116493) 2004 BL_{13}
- (116498) 2004 BS_{19}
- (116516) 2004 BA_{42} (ULA)
- (116952) 2004 GP_{76}
- (117243) 2004 SU_{25} (SYL)
- (117315) 2004 VO_{55} (SYL)
- (117945) 6271 P-L
- (118186) 1993 XC
- (118431) 1999 TD_{187}
- (118474) 2000 AH_{41}
- (119903) 2002 EE_{6} (SYL)
- (119936) 2002 GC_{27}
- (120360) 2005 MT_{43}
- (121601) 1999 VP_{136}
- (121746) 1999 XV_{207}
- (121824) 2000 BU_{9}
- (121885) 2000 DQ_{6}
- (121901) 2000 DT_{44} (SYL)
- (121943) 2000 EV_{27}
- (123799) 2001 BK_{48}
- (124224) 2001 PF_{17}
- (126119) 2001 YZ_{113}
- (127312) 2002 JC_{91}
- (127468) 2002 RC_{86}
- (128128) 2003 QO_{40}
- (128197) 2003 SR_{35} (SYL)
- (128208) 2003 SZ_{62}
- (128243) 2003 SO_{173}
- (128313) 2004 CB_{95}
- (128552) 2004 PA_{77}
- 128633 Queyras
- (129080) 2004 VM_{73}
- 129259 Tapolca (SYL)
- (129749) 1999 CJ_{137}
- (130227) 2000 BC_{22}
- (130342) 2000 FK_{53}
- (130379) 2000 HO_{15}
- (130382) 2000 HW_{60}
- (130385) 2000 JS_{29}
- (130418) 2000 OV_{60}
- (131443) 2001 QH_{88}
- (131480) 2001 RY_{101}
- (132748) 2002 PB_{45}
- (132948) 2002 TL_{64}
- (133012) 2002 UT_{16}
- (133016) 2002 VY_{7} (SYL)
- (133402) 2003 SP_{169} (SYL)
- (133428) 2003 SA_{199}
- (133564) 2003 US_{26}
- (133768) 2003 WL_{69}
- (134086) 2004 XR_{103} (SYL)
- (134263) 2006 BB_{29}
- (134868) 2000 QE_{21}
- (134870) 2000 QQ_{82}
- (135315) 2001 SM_{277}
- (135483) 2001 WM_{99} (SYL)
- (136100) 2003 DW_{12}
- 136367 Gierlinger
- (136615) 1994 AP_{10}
- (136620) 1994 JC
- (137629) 1999 VN_{226}
- (138699) 2000 SL_{77}
- (138781) 2000 SH_{339}
- (138816) 2000 TG_{65}
- (138854) 2000 WK_{17}
- (138867) 2000 XD_{5}
- (140348) 2001 TK_{15}
- (141307) 2001 YK_{112} (SYL)
- (141324) 2001 YV_{133}
- (141377) 2002 AJ_{64}
- (141394) 2002 AS_{109}
- (141420) 2002 BG_{24} (SYL)
- (141481) 2002 CM_{288}
- (141513) 2002 EZ_{93} (SYL)
- (143243) 2002 YA_{26}
- (143283) 2003 AX_{25}
- (143411) 2003 BS_{48}
- (143413) 2003 BF_{49}
- (143631) 2003 HS_{35}
- (144797) 2004 HM_{49}
- (144885) 2004 RH_{116}
- (145348) 2005 MJ_{15}
- (145428) 2005 QP_{64}
- (145496) 2005 WQ_{113}
- (145528) 2006 FB_{29}
- 145545 Wensayling
- (146258) 2001 AO_{22}
- (146951) 2002 EP_{69}
- (146962) 2002 JN_{5}
- (147844) 2005 TG_{190}
- (147916) 2006 UX_{200}
- (149536) 2003 GV_{41}
- (149745) 2004 NR_{22}
- (149769) 2004 QM_{9}
- (149776) 2004 RU_{152} (SYL)
- (149852) 2005 QB_{10}
- (149974) 2005 TY_{191} (SYL)
- (150075) 2006 SP_{223}
- (150264) 1999 RS_{108}
- (150647) 2001 DU_{71}
- (152111) 2004 RA_{182}
- (152113) 2004 RG_{207}
- (152331) 2005 UW_{29}
- (152528) 2006 VU_{124}
- (152835) 1999 VD_{74}
- 153289 Rebeccawatson (SYL)
- (154613) 2003 SJ_{56}
- (154621) 2003 SZ_{204}
- (154625) 2003 SP_{297}
- (154904) 2004 RA_{306}
- (154906) 2004 RH_{306}
- (154915) 2004 SB_{14}
- (154966) 2004 TF_{239} (SYL)
- (155302) 2005 YS_{46} (SYL)
- (155305) 2005 YU_{73}
- (157028) 2003 QH_{103}
- (157060) 2003 SZ_{199}
- (157073) 2003 UL_{56}
- (157078) 2003 WQ_{31}
- (157658) 2005 YB_{38}
- (157697) 2006 AA_{7}
- (157701) 2006 AD_{21}
- (158152) 2001 HO_{50}
- (158596) 2002 PA_{128} (SYL)
- (159367) 1977 OX
- (159701) 2002 QD_{23}
- (159886) 2004 SP_{33}
- (159990) 2006 DY_{38}
- 160259 Mareike
- (160875) 2001 OQ_{21}
- (160888) 2001 QT_{258} (SYL)
- (160890) 2001 QH_{282}
- (161478) 2004 GX_{25}
- (162969) 2001 QT_{232}
- (163004) 2001 SK_{234} (SYL)
- (163008) 2001 ST_{324}
- (163010) 2001 TM_{45} (SYL)
- (163012) 2001 TC_{220} (SYL)
- (163013) 2001 TG_{230}
- (163474) 2002 RE_{212}
- (164673) 1997 BR_{4}
- (164808) 1999 JC_{116}
- (165233) 2000 SP_{102} (SYL)
- (165696) 2001 PQ_{34}
- (165914) 2001 TE_{31}
- (165921) 2001 TQ_{132}
- (165928) 2001 TS_{196}
- (165939) 2001 UN_{98} (SYL)
- (165991) 2001 YL_{149} (SYL)
- (167579) 2004 BF_{73}
- (167625) 2004 CJ_{57}
- (168039) 2005 LR_{1}
- (168793) 2000 SS_{57}
- (168837) 2000 TZ_{36}
- (169387) 2001 VC_{40}
- (169404) 2001 XF_{15} (SYL)
- (169415) 2001 XM_{200}
- (169429) 2001 YP_{149} (SYL)
- (170163) 2003 FE_{31} (SYL)
- (171202) 2005 JS_{55}
- (171398) 2006 QH_{42}
- (171414) 2006 RJ_{91}
- (171745) 2000 XU
- (172060) 2001 XR_{208}
- (172075) 2002 AC_{95} (SYL)
- (172079) 2002 BX_{30}
- (172416) 2003 FV_{5}
- (172420) 2003 GM_{48}
- (172973) 2005 SR_{167} (SYL)
- (173058) 2006 SY_{53}
- (173838) 2001 TD_{100}
- (174044) 2002 AY_{171} (SYL)
- (174047) 2002 BW_{12}
- (174053) 2002 CF_{54}
- (175101) 2004 JA_{40} (SYL)
- 175365 Carsac (SYL)
- (176569) 2002 AW_{190}
- (176631) 2002 KA
- (177879) 2005 QH_{104}
- (177895) 2005 QU_{178}
- (177920) 2005 SG_{225}
- (179538) 2002 CG_{241}
- (180788) 2004 RF_{195}
- (181067) 2005 QG_{9}
- (181143) 2005 QM_{174} (SYL)
- (181175) 2005 SY_{71}
- (181177) 2005 SV_{73}
- (181226) 2005 TD_{35}
- (181231) 2005 TA_{83} (SYL)
- (181248) 2005 UL_{145}
- (181847) 1998 UG_{10}
- (182931) 2002 GQ_{1}
- (182954) 2002 JH_{1}
- (183525) 2003 FK_{110}
- (183575) 2003 QP_{72}
- (184193) 2004 PO_{30}
- (184251) 2004 SD_{47}
- (184682) 2005 SF_{84} (SYL)
- (184913) 2005 UQ_{382}
- (185089) 2006 RF_{93}
- (185140) 2006 SE_{129}
- (185464) 2007 BS_{5}
- (185484) 2007 DB_{85} (SYL)
- (185532) 2007 WR_{42} (SYL)
- (185809) 1999 VU_{218}
- (187446) 2005 WV_{115}
- (187454) 2005 WB_{192}
- (188546) 2004 SQ_{29}
- (188549) 2004 ST_{59}
- (188795) 2005 VD_{113}
- (188927) 2007 CM_{2}
- (188959) 2007 ED_{210}
- (189375) 2008 FD_{70}
- (190213) 2006 BL_{66}
- (191191) 2002 OY_{20}
- (191222) 2002 RY_{88}
- (191225) 2002 RN_{150} (SYL)
- (191237) 2002 TA_{175}
- (191904) 2005 CU_{37}
- (193318) 2000 SV_{322}
- (193810) 2001 PA_{39}
- (193899) 2001 QY_{230}
- (194038) 2001 SV_{87} (SYL)
- (194067) 2001 SQ_{139} (SYL)
- (194131) 2001 SE_{299}
- (194147) 2001 SW_{349}
- (194225) 2001 TX_{145}
- (194790) 2001 YV_{89} (ULA)
- (195838) 2002 QM_{66}
- (196054) 2002 TK
- (196081) 2002 TO_{84}
- (196103) 2002 TX_{133}
- (196145) 2002 TU_{279} (SYL)
- (196159) 2002 VT_{17}
- (196160) 2002 VW_{26}
- (196161) 2002 VM_{37}
- (196163) 2002 VD_{43} (SYL)
- (197365) 2003 XF_{21}
- (197406) 2003 YO_{42}
- (197501) 2004 BS_{91}
- (197529) 2004 EU_{26}
- (198815) 2005 EJ_{222}
- (199700) 2006 HF_{40}
- (200039) 2007 RY_{156}
- (200685) 2001 TG_{219}
- (201197) 2002 PF_{111}
- (201364) 2002 TU_{252}
- (201927) 2004 CC_{97}
- (202771) 2007 RH_{278}
- (203261) 2001 QA_{187}
- (203339) 2001 UT_{60}
- (203394) 2001 XT_{141}
- (203428) 2001 XP_{263}
- (204274) 2004 FL_{142}
- (205287) 2000 SY_{173}
- (205487) 2001 QP_{242}
- (206298) 2003 DO_{20}
- (206310) 2003 HG_{38}
- (207376) 2005 MR_{41}
- (207378) 2005 NE_{28} (SYL)
- (207636) 2006 SQ_{394} (SYL)
- (207983) 1997 FT_{4}
- (208517) 2001 XQ_{129}
- (209025) 2003 EZ_{55} (SYL)
- (209490) 2004 JW_{3}
- (210178) 2006 UH_{74}
- (210189) 2006 VS_{150}
- (210382) 2007 VB_{88}
- (210559) 1999 TA_{136}
- (210714) 2000 SW_{212}
- (210718) 2000 ST_{252}
- (212323) 2005 QG_{157} (SYL)
- (212669) 2006 UL_{278}
- (213058) 1999 RJ_{7}
- (213108) 1999 XY_{144} (SYL)
- (213462) 2002 CQ_{198}
- (213515) 2002 GX_{138}
- (214099) 2004 NN_{17}
- (214113) 2004 RP_{339}
- (214437) 2005 QY_{106} (SYL)
- (214480) 2005 TH_{74}
- (214482) 2005 TF_{106}
- (215058) 2009 DW_{94}
- (215999) 2005 SV_{242}
- (216005) 2005 TU_{130}
- (216069) 2006 QZ_{14}
- (216212) 2006 UC_{73} (SYL)
- (216302) 2007 RJ_{149}
- (218301) 2003 SG_{198} (SYL)
- (218537) 2004 VO_{18}
- (218791) 2005 YE_{184}
- (220149) 2002 TQ_{170}
- (220402) 2003 SJ_{38}
- (220412) 2003 SL_{128}
- (220425) 2003 SL_{304} (SYL)
- (220433) 2003 UC_{183}
- (220435) 2003 UX_{263}
- (220908) 2005 CL_{59}
- (221469) 2006 BW_{141}
- (221737) 2007 ED_{112}
- (221893) 2008 JU_{19}
- (222975) 2002 QK_{126} (SYL)
- (223003) 2002 RS_{184}
- (223054) 2002 TR_{134} (SYL)
- (223424) 2003 SY_{250}
- (223466) 2003 UE_{133} (SYL)
- (223477) 2003 WX_{62}
- (223479) 2003 WL_{154} (SYL)
- (224750) 2006 DA_{91}
- (224769) 2006 FC_{14}
- (224771) 2006 FN_{16} (SYL)
- (225060) 2007 HG_{4}
- (225642) 2001 FY_{89}
- (226544) 2003 UZ_{245}
- (226573) 2003 XO_{13} (ULA)
- (228921) 2003 SZ_{238}
- (230133) 2001 OD_{78} (ULA)
- (230505) 2002 UH_{34}
- (230787) 2004 BE_{13}
- (231471) 2007 TP_{185}
- (231870) 2000 SZ_{364} (ULA)
- (232726) 2004 CK_{65}
- (232745) 2004 HL_{18}
- (232944) 2005 CL_{34}
- (233069) 2005 JJ_{67}
- (233670) 2008 RW_{35}
- (234441) 2001 SG_{85}
- (234514) 2001 TW_{240}
- (234881) 2002 TS_{50}
- (234889) 2002 TB_{113}
- (234984) 2003 AM_{52}
- (235452) 2003 YZ_{148}
- (235574) 2004 KO_{8}
- (236116) 2005 SX_{104}
- (236678) 2006 QY_{44} (SYL)
- (236875) 2007 RQ_{277}
- (236877) 2007 RH_{281}
- (237282) 2008 XW_{15}
- (237435) 1999 RH_{9}
- (237822) 2002 CQ_{181} (SYL)
- (238431) 2004 JU_{8}
- (239248) 2006 TJ_{94}
- (239503) 2007 VH_{165} (SYL)
- (239693) 2008 YP_{132}
- (239714) 2009 AY_{45}
- (239735) 2009 CH_{44} (ULA)
- (239908) 2000 SH_{223}
- (240000) 2001 SY_{244}
- (240505) 2004 EP_{61} (SYL)
- (240763) 2005 LL_{38}
- (241089) 2006 UE_{265}
- (241504) 2009 CD_{44} (SYL)
- (241710) 2000 SF_{367}
- (242151) 2003 CF_{15}
- (242459) 2004 RU_{184}
- (242473) 2004 TG_{27}
- (242481) 2004 TW_{220} (ULA)
- (242661) 2005 QT_{101}
- (242729) 2005 UL_{211}
- (242942) 2006 QY_{183} (ULA)
- (242947) 2006 RE_{44} (SYL)
- (242966) 2006 SW_{79}
- (243014) 2006 UN_{161} (SYL)
- (243023) 2006 UG_{206}
- (243045) 2006 XS_{31}
- (243050) 2007 BX_{3}
- (243238) 2007 VB_{167}
- 243285 Fauvaud
- 243320 Jackuipers
- (243321) 2008 SG_{20}
- (243386) 2008 YP_{51}
- (243402) 2009 AX_{24}
- (243404) 2009 BU_{4}
- (243525) 2010 DY_{8}
- (244200) 2001 YU_{99}
- (244556) 2002 VA_{61}
- (244606) 2002 YA_{30}
- (244960) 2003 YW_{148}
- (245180) 2004 TQ_{173} (SYL)
- (245474) 2005 NP_{59} (SYL)
- (245530) 2005 SE_{202} (SYL)
- (245880) 2006 QM_{19} (SYL)
- (246018) 2006 TA_{79}
- (246019) 2006 TX_{92}
- (246052) 2006 UB_{253} (SYL)
- (246402) 2007 UB_{81} (SYL)
- (246778) 2009 DK_{16} (ULA)
- (246782) 2009 DT_{51}
- (246840) 2010 DW_{45} (SYL)
- (246951) 1999 RL_{191}
- (246965) 1999 TS_{70}
- (247032) 2000 BY_{12}
- (247288) 2001 SC_{250}
- (247354) 2001 VG_{101} (SYL)
- (247400) 2002 AL_{205} (ULA)
- (247464) 2002 GF_{167}
- (247763) 2003 QX_{17}
- (247823) 2003 SG_{185} (SYL)
- (247961) 2003 YA_{123}
- (248083) 2004 QU_{24}
- (248103) 2004 RX_{94}
- (248141) 2004 TW_{31} (SYL)
- (248155) 2004 TK_{293}
- (248484) 2005 UU_{237} (SYL)
- (248485) 2005 UM_{243}
- (248572) 2006 AA_{92}
- (248799) 2006 SW_{115} (SYL)
- (249194) 2008 CP_{200}
- (249210) 2008 DN_{67}
- (249311) 2008 UM_{128}
- (249338) 2008 VT_{23} (SYL)
- (249397) 2009 BB_{125}
- (249428) 2009 EP_{22} (SYL)
- 249520 Luppino
- (250571) 2004 TY_{323} (SYL)
- (250853) 2005 UQ_{248}
- (250955) 2006 CF_{68}
- (251512) 2008 FK_{58}
- (251518) 2008 FW_{118}
- (251971) 2000 AN_{150}
- (252002) 2000 EU_{170}
- (253477) 2003 SC_{63}
- (253515) 2003 SO_{159}
- (253533) 2003 SO_{206}
- (253693) 2003 UY_{260} (SYL)
- (254297) 2004 RY_{284}
- (254367) 2004 TO_{100}
- (255249) 2005 UZ_{508}
- (255459) 2005 YB_{76}
- (255464) 2005 YJ_{86}
- (255503) 2006 BS_{17}
- (255504) 2006 BV_{26}
- (255516) 2006 BP_{260}
- (255540) 2006 HY_{105}
- (256520) 2007 EM_{200}
- (256529) 2007 FK
- (257148) 2008 HL_{15}
- (257363) 2009 NC_{2}
- (257374) 2009 QA_{13}
- (257403) 2009 SO_{299} (SYL)
- (257839) 2000 JQ_{90}
- (257986) 2001 DS_{69}
- (258715) 2002 GX_{78}
- (258907) 2002 QP_{113} (SYL)
- (259436) 2003 SO_{28}
- (259463) 2003 SS_{107}
- (259511) 2003 SU_{333}
- (259603) 2003 UZ_{276}
- (260190) 2004 RM_{153} (SYL)
- (260334) 2004 TS_{218} (SYL)
- (260491) 2005 CV_{73}
- (261189) 2005 TY_{141}
- (261377) 2005 UJ_{358} (SYL)
- (261457) 2005 VC_{68}
- (261504) 2005 WX_{35}
- (261672) 2005 YY_{166}
- (261849) 2006 DM_{164} (SYL)
- (261851) 2006 DD_{186}
- (263385) 2008 CH_{200}
- (263423) 2008 DO_{52} (SYL)
- (263494) 2008 EP_{100}
- (263678) 2008 GS_{122} (SYL)
- (264021) 2009 QB_{2}
- 264061 Vitebsk
- (264102) 2009 SE_{305}
- (264104) 2009 SA_{311}
- (264162) 2010 AL_{102}
- (264184) 2010 EV_{120}
- (264190) 2010 FY_{93}
- (264211) 2010 PU_{35}
- (264906) 2002 TN_{115} (SYL)
- (264909) 2002 TH_{146}
- (265071) 2003 SB_{105}
- (265466) 2005 AH_{39}
- (265492) 2005 GA_{13}
- (266628) 2008 QT_{30}
- (266643) 2008 SF_{62}
- (266655) 2008 TT_{121}
- (266806) 2009 SF_{352}
- (266853) 2009 UP_{88}
- (266891) 2009 WR_{49}
- (266894) 2009 WR_{81}
- (266918) 2010 AZ_{71}
- (266957) 2010 UF_{58}
- (267015) 1995 SL_{62} (SYL)
- (267508) 2002 NN_{8}
- (268217) 2005 CR_{39}
- (268232) 2005 EH_{136}
- (268727) 2006 JK_{51} (SYL)
- (269124) 2007 PC_{23}
- (269139) 2007 TJ_{284}
- (269278) 2008 RH_{108}
- (269347) 2008 TV_{110}
- (269524) 2009 VX_{16}
- (269546) 2009 VE_{108}
- (270161) 2001 SU_{157} (SYL)
- (270211) 2001 TJ_{99} (SYL)
- (270263) 2001 UF_{139} (SYL)
- (271116) 2003 ST_{2}
- (272007) 2005 CT_{63}
- (272092) 2005 GL_{29}
- (272104) 2005 JF_{24}
- (273239) 2006 KG_{26}
- (274049) 2007 RK_{315}
- (274059) 2007 TB_{95}
- (274338) 2008 RV_{29}
- (274465) 2008 SS_{69} (SYL)
- (274546) 2008 SF_{250}
- (274559) 2008 SH_{272} (SYL)
- (274599) 2008 TR_{34} (SYL)
- (274602) 2008 TS_{37}
- (274753) 2008 UD_{277} (SYL)
- (274803) 2008 WT_{113}
- (275320) 2010 UY_{36}
- (275408) 2011 BP_{53}
- (275917) 2001 TN_{177}
- (276386) 2002 WD_{22} (SYL)
- (276944) 2004 TX_{251}
- (277134) 2005 JE_{5}
- (277800) 2006 EV_{73}
- (277953) 2006 SK_{24}
- (278106) 2007 BX_{67}
- (278446) 2007 SA_{16}
- 278447 Saviano
- (278792) 2008 SK_{202} (SYL)
- (278923) 2008 TO_{182}
- (279082) 2008 WC_{101} (SYL)
- (279144) 2009 SW_{13} (SYL)
- (279287) 2009 WC_{77}
- (279308) 2009 WM_{216}
- (279359) 2010 AO_{50}
- (279387) 2010 CA_{70} (SYL)
- (279500) 2011 AS_{42} (SYL)
- (279716) 2011 GJ_{57}
- (280023) 2001 WH_{101} (SYL)
- (280415) 2003 WT_{156}
- (280748) 2005 NO_{94} (SYL)
- (281079) 2006 RB_{26}
- (281082) 2006 SH_{33}
- (281318) 2007 TQ_{103}
- (281739) 2008 YW_{20} (SYL)
- (281757) 2009 BK_{98} (SYL)
- (281870) 2010 EH_{66} (SYL)
- (281874) 2010 ES_{102}
- (283135) 2008 XL_{50}
- (283165) 2009 CP_{64} (SYL)
- (283187) 2010 BB_{13} (SYL)
- (283249) 2011 ET_{28}
- (283251) 2011 EY_{29}
- (284553) 2007 RD_{319}
- (284662) 2008 CE_{28}
- (284936) 2010 DU_{50}
- (284937) 2010 DY_{53}
- (285018) 2011 CA_{71} (SYL)
- (285319) 1999 BD_{31}
- (285527) 2000 FJ_{52}
- (285835) 2001 DW_{83} (SYL)
- (287047) 2002 QJ_{123} (SYL)
- (288204) 2003 YM_{12}
- (288759) 2004 RD_{81}
- (289035) 2004 TR_{134}
- (289136) 2004 VN_{4}
- (289362) 2005 BR_{48}
- (289915) 2005 NK_{19}
- (290006) 2005 PL_{24}
- (290017) 2005 QQ_{15}
- (290049) 2005 QL_{47}
- (290163) 2005 RT_{11}
- (290291) 2005 SM_{168}
- (290379) 2005 SQ_{289}
- (290389) 2005 TH_{8} (SYL)
- (290712) 2005 UC_{414} (SYL)
- (290904) 2005 WU_{99}
- (290910) 2005 WV_{104}
- (290988) 2005 XY_{50}
- (290991) 2005 XZ_{62}
- (291064) 2005 YW_{88}
- (291397) 2006 CM_{56}
- (292408) 2006 SL_{286} (ULA)
- (292996) 2006 WR_{11}
- (293178) 2007 AV_{6}
- (293227) 2007 BA_{58}
- (293337) 2007 DZ_{86} (SYL)
- (293346) 2007 DG_{105}
- (293475) 2007 ER_{220} (SYL)
- (293534) 2007 GG_{68}
- (294952) 2008 DQ_{71} (SYL)
- (295033) 2008 EU_{81}
- (295318) 2008 GS_{133} (SYL)
- (296054) 2009 AR_{29}
- (296373) 2009 FK_{43}
- (296386) 2009 FK_{64} (SYL)
- (296484) 2009 HW_{103}
- (296642) 2009 SE_{115}
- (296660) 2009 ST_{149}
- (296813) 2009 VL_{111} (SYL)
- (296883) 2010 AD_{52}
- (297009) 2010 FL_{84}
- (297025) 2010 GA_{33} (ULA)
- (297966) 2002 HJ_{15}
- (298321) 2003 ED_{56}
- (299345) 2005 SE_{153} (SYL)
- (299347) 2005 SO_{177}
- (299352) 2005 SQ_{225}
- (299353) 2005 SR_{235}
- (299368) 2005 UL_{84}
- (299370) 2005 UT_{193}
- (299372) 2005 UA_{225} (SYL)
- (299378) 2005 UL_{425}
- (299379) 2005 UR_{500} (SYL)
- (299381) 2005 UP_{515}
- (300903) 2008 BX_{38}
- (300922) 2008 CU_{36}
- (300959) 2008 DF_{24}
- (300968) 2008 EN_{3}
- (301563) 2009 HK_{25} (ULA)
- (301568) 2009 HU_{39} (ULA)
- (301577) 2009 KT_{17} (SYL)
- (301796) 2010 OW_{41}
- (302423) 2002 CD_{249} (SYL)
- (303226) 2004 NY_{30}
- (303238) 2004 PC_{50}
- (303289) 2004 RH_{337} (SYL)
- (303311) 2004 TB_{46} (SYL)
- (303830) 2005 SY_{123}
- (303850) 2005 SR_{193}
- (303912) 2005 UC_{22}
- (303925) 2005 UW_{298}
- (303939) 2005 WO_{23}
- (305512) 2008 EU_{158}
- (306199) 2011 QV_{1}
- (307286) 2002 PA_{96}
- (307464) 2002 WL
- (307642) 2003 SU_{138}
- (308077) 2004 TF_{273} (ULA)
- (308480) 2005 TV_{61}
- (308576) 2005 UB_{438} (ULA)
- (308624) 2005 XN_{11}
- (308627) 2005 XG_{45}
- (309181) 2007 CF_{20}
- (309693) 2008 FU_{35}
- (310073) 2010 KX_{81}
- (310086) 2010 MY_{101} (SYL)
- (310093) 2010 PC_{51}
- (310163) 2011 RC_{1} (ULA)
- (310207) 2011 SW_{164} (SYL)
- (310298) 2011 UA_{86}
- (310717) 2002 NR_{71}
- (310928) 2003 SV_{236} (SYL)
- (310983) 2003 UM_{341}
- (311173) 2004 TE_{295}
- (311526) 2005 YN_{25}
- (311530) 2005 YY_{49}
- (311531) 2005 YJ_{52}
- (311546) 2005 YD_{250}
- (311548) 2006 AG_{7}
- (312441) 2008 HN_{59}
- (312705) 2010 PW_{21} (SYL)
- (312708) 2010 PJ_{44}
- (312978) 1999 JG_{29}
- (313413) 2002 PK_{175}
- (313450) 2002 RJ_{218} (SYL)
- (313470) 2002 TT_{113}
- (314335) 2005 TL_{28}
- (314603) 2006 BD_{28}
- (315030) 2007 BR_{77} (SYL)
- (315074) 2007 DC_{52} (SYL)
- (315145) 2007 EU_{169}
- (316492) 2010 VJ_{93}
- (316516) 2010 VL_{164}
- (316533) 2010 WB_{29}
- (316542) 2010 XJ_{21}
- (316604) 2011 VG_{5} (ULA)
- (316631) 2011 WY_{114}
- (316986) 2001 LJ
- (316987) 2001 LU
- (317030) 2001 QZ_{254}
- (317356) 2002 MD_{7}
- (317448) 2002 QH_{125}
- (317471) 2002 RV_{158}
- (317484) 2002 RS_{271}
- (317524) 2002 TK_{184}
- (317576) 2002 VQ_{143}
- (317980) 2003 YU_{149} (SYL)
- (317996) 2004 BH_{136}
- (318395) 2004 XQ_{66}
- (318418) 2005 AU_{67}
- (318709) 2005 QD_{119}
- (319295) 2006 BG_{96}
- (319302) 2006 BV_{114}
- (319356) 2006 CX_{59}
- (320473) 2007 VD_{306}
- (321148) 2008 UZ_{286}
- (321214) 2008 YA_{95}
- (321285) 2009 FL_{9}
- (321618) 2009 WQ_{35}
- (321984) 2010 UZ_{54}
- (322120) 2010 VS_{168}
- (322247) 2011 CV_{85}
- (322283) 2011 FK_{14}
- (322450) 2011 UD_{13}
- (322467) 2011 UF_{129} (SYL)
- (322713) 2000 KD_{41}
- (323021) 2002 PC_{193} (SYL)
- (323033) 2002 QO_{116}
- (323068) 2002 TS_{54}
- (323328) 2003 UJ_{164} (SYL)
- (323372) 2003 WL_{109}
- (323655) 2005 CF_{33}
- (324327) 2006 JB_{72} (SYL)
- (325377) 2008 SO_{39}
- (325604) 2009 SJ_{204}
- (325690) 2009 UN_{13}
- (325705) 2009 UB_{72}
- (325721) 2009 UT_{133} (SYL)
- (325734) 2009 VH_{50}
- (325762) 2010 AL_{94}
- (326053) 2011 AW_{10}
- (326055) 2011 AO_{11} (SYL)
- (326059) 2011 AE_{32} (SYL)
- (326070) 2011 AY_{60}
- (326092) 2011 BA_{86}
- (326409) 2001 SG_{205}
- (326831) 2003 UN_{29}
- (327117) 2005 EH_{63}
- (327629) 2006 KQ_{84}
- (327630) 2006 MC_{3}
- (328404) 2008 SH_{48} (SYL)
- (328420) 2008 SC_{213}
- (328425) 2008 SZ_{278} (SYL)
- (328440) 2008 TT_{34} (SYL)
- (328443) 2008 TT_{62}
- (328739) 2009 UQ_{26}
- (329081) 2011 BN_{34}
- (329085) 2011 BD_{50} (SYL)
- (329122) 2011 CO_{50}
- (329145) 2011 WB_{67} (SYL)
- (329349) 2001 RK_{116}
- (329363) 2001 TQ_{180}
- (329370) 2001 UY_{190}
- (329575) 2002 VS_{138}
- (330764) 2008 SR_{264}
- (330813) 2008 VZ_{49} (SYL)
- (331882) 2004 CR_{120}
- (332000) 2005 JK_{69}
- (333126) 2011 WY_{56}
- (333168) 2012 CR_{41} (SYL)
- (333366) 2002 CP_{143}
- (333624) 2007 VW_{93} (SYL)
- (333625) 2007 VB_{111}
- (333709) 2008 YD_{122} (SYL)
- (335660) 2006 SX_{1}
- (335663) 2006 SP_{135}
- (335666) 2006 SQ_{171}
- (336532) 2008 YH_{153}
- (336544) 2009 BF_{63} (SYL)
- (336713) 2010 CF_{127} (SYL)
- (338009) 2002 ED_{130}
- (339665) 2005 QO_{92} (SYL)
- (339697) 2005 RH
- (339727) 2005 SF_{37} (SYL)
- (339763) 2005 SF_{95} (SYL)
- (339834) 2005 SQ_{282} (SYL)
- (340729) 2006 SL_{143} (SYL)
- (340737) 2006 SN_{179}
- (340749) 2006 SK_{264} (SYL)
- (340776) 2006 SG_{366}
- (340789) 2006 SE_{403}
- (340796) 2006 TB_{60}
- (340804) 2006 TR_{78}
- (340806) 2006 TQ_{103} (SYL)
- (340811) 2006 UR_{11}
- (340819) 2006 UT_{87}
- (340822) 2006 UT_{125} (SYL)
- (340826) 2006 UF_{152}
- (340835) 2006 VO_{4}
- (340838) 2006 VL_{129}
- (340841) 2006 WJ_{39} (SYL)
- (341825) 2008 AE_{22} (SYL)
- (341846) 2008 EV_{55}
- (343101) 2009 DD_{60} (SYL)
- (343129) 2009 ER_{26}
- (343148) 2009 FF_{69}
- (343151) 2009 FR_{76}
- (343320) 2010 BF_{84}
- (343674) 2010 OM_{78}
- (344130) 1999 XW_{235}
- (345162) 2005 SK_{224}
- (345170) 2005 SW_{285}
- (345179) 2005 TG_{78}
- (345549) 2006 RR_{4}
- (345699) 2006 UZ_{250}
- (345715) 2006 WF_{115}
- (346236) 2008 BD_{5}
- (346798) 2009 BM_{174} (SYL)
- (346884) 2009 JX_{12}
- (347323) 2011 SM_{39} (SYL)
- (348550) 2005 UB_{369}
- (350183) 2011 UD_{198}
- (351596) 2005 US_{524}
- (352115) 2007 DD_{32} (SYL)
- (352609) 2008 EA_{94}
- (352635) 2008 GK_{88} (SYL)
- (352637) 2008 GW_{108}
- (353478) 2011 SM_{37}
- (353628) 2011 UU_{54} (SYL)
- (353630) 2011 UP_{59}
- (353640) 2011 UJ_{82}
- (353655) 2011 UM_{128}
- (353704) 2011 UK_{394} (SYL)
- (353779) 2012 HR_{78}
- (353898) 2012 XU_{46}
- (353928) 1995 DW_{5}
- (354816) 2005 WA_{30} (SYL)
- (354825) 2005 WK_{159}
- (354839) 2005 YD_{28} (SYL)
- (354842) 2005 YY_{95}
- (354860) 2005 YX_{234}
- (355242) 2007 DG_{11} (SYL)
- (355256) 2007 KN_{4}
- (355728) 2008 GT_{69}
- (356370) 2010 MJ_{90}
- (356382) 2010 ON_{28}
- (356388) 2010 PX_{22} (SYL)
- (356410) 2010 TQ_{49}
- (356651) 2011 UK_{61}
- (356824) 2011 UN_{391}
- (356883) 2011 WW_{132}
- (357879) 2005 UK_{432}
- (357906) 2005 VZ_{85}
- (358446) 2007 DJ_{117}
- (358448) 2007 EC_{35}
- (358463) 2007 GU_{68} (SYL)
- (359432) 2010 MY_{7} (SYL)
- (359454) 2010 NH_{30} (SYL)
- (359464) 2010 NG_{61}
- (359510) 2010 RX_{43}
- (359870) 2011 WC_{6}
- (359993) 2012 VH_{93}
- (360151) 2013 CX_{59}
- (360154) 2013 CR_{65}
- (360459) 2002 QH_{153}
- (360581) 2003 UU_{277} (SYL)
- (360670) 2004 RU_{175}
- (360707) 2004 TC_{56}
- (361536) 2007 JE_{7} (SYL)
- (362288) 2009 SE_{99}
- (362291) 2009 SR_{225}
- (362394) 2010 OE_{58}
- (362536) 2010 UW_{23} (SYL)
- (362557) 2010 VU_{31}
- (362926) 2012 DO_{42} (SYL)
- (362931) 2012 ES_{4} (SYL)
- (363332) 2002 PN_{157}
- (363497) 2003 TA_{46} (SYL)
- (363555) 2003 WB_{105}
- (365313) 2009 SC_{35} (SYL)
- (365327) 2009 SM_{141}
- (365394) 2009 WO_{44}
- (365401) 2009 WZ_{199}
- (365409) 2010 AX_{100} (ULA)
- (365736) 2010 WK_{8}
- (365934) 2011 YM_{68}
- (365960) 2012 BE_{24}
- (366107) 2012 DG_{17}
- (366163) 2012 FQ_{34}
- (366186) 2012 HE_{26}
- (366201) 2012 KH_{23}
- (366307) 2013 CR_{84}
- (366638) 2003 SK_{143}
- (367061) 2006 KM_{69}
- (367249) 2007 PC_{28} (SYL)
- (367437) 2008 SF_{146}
- (367452) 2008 UN_{60}
- (367837) 2011 BC_{87}
- (367853) 2011 CW_{29}
- (367873) 2011 DO_{30}
- (367952) 2012 DG_{53}
- (368078) 2012 LB_{8}
- (368079) 2012 MR
- (369018) 2007 TS_{181}
- (369231) 2008 UB_{276} (SYL)
- (369439) 2010 AB_{38}
- (369819) 2012 HD_{60}
- (369916) 2013 CO_{180} (SYL)
- (370127) 2001 VU_{95}
- (370679) 2004 ED_{72}
- (370691) 2004 GL_{63}
- (371802) 2007 RJ_{51}
- (371812) 2007 TA_{60}
- (371813) 2007 TQ_{62}
- (371815) 2007 TQ_{144} (SYL)
- (371834) 2007 VR_{245} (SYL)
- (372230) 2008 UO_{80}
- (372262) 2008 UK_{245}
- (372282) 2008 UW_{351}
- (372299) 2008 VN_{73}
- (372313) 2008 WT_{111}
- (372760) 2010 CJ_{29}
- (373076) 2011 FE_{82}
- (373378) 2012 MB_{3}
- (373403) 1995 UJ_{64}
- (373549) 2001 US_{143}
- (373573) 2001 YM_{13}
- (373585) 2002 AY_{174}
- (374010) 2004 CH_{71}
- (374024) 2004 EX_{45}
- (374658) 2006 KM_{18}
- (375101) 2007 TB_{44}
- (375105) 2007 TS_{79}
- (375106) 2007 TT_{128} (SYL)
- (375132) 2007 WR_{39}
- (375133) 2007 WS_{49} (SYL)
- (375644) 2008 YF_{99}
- (375653) 2009 BJ_{60}
- (375655) 2009 BV_{154}
- (375659) 2009 CQ_{33}
- (376342) 2011 HU_{20}
- (376590) 2013 PB_{26}
- (376601) 2013 PY_{31}
- (376705) 2013 RA_{12}
- (376751) 1999 UU_{40}
- (377996) 2006 RU_{50} (SYL)
- (378050) 2006 TJ_{39} (SYL)
- (378108) 2006 UO_{223}
- (379114) 2008 YG_{125}
- (379128) 2009 BW_{135}
- (379426) 2010 BF_{10}
- (379443) 2010 CV_{80}
- (379497) 2010 FN_{21} (SYL)
- (380024) 2013 QN_{18}
- (380958) 2006 QD_{11}
- (381034) 2006 VR_{54}
- (381050) 2006 WR_{3}
- (381335) 2007 YE_{33}
- (381340) 2008 BZ_{47}
- (381900) 2010 BU_{76}
- (382244) 2012 SM_{40}
- (382257) 2012 TK_{59}
- (383433) 2006 VH_{103}
- (383454) 2006 WC_{205}
- (383811) 2008 AE_{34}
- (383815) 2008 BX_{52}
- (385026) 2012 TZ_{288}
- (385060) 2012 UC_{48} (SYL)
- (385696) 2005 TV_{100}
- (385956) 2006 VX_{53}
- (385957) 2006 VK_{60} (SYL)
- (387353) 2012 XV_{11}
- (387460) 2013 WQ_{107} (SYL)
- (387501) 1996 XC_{17}
- (388126) 2005 UQ_{510}
- (388148) 2005 WP_{159}
- (388357) 2006 TA_{121}
- (388842) 2008 EA_{73}
- (388852) 2008 GF_{49}
- (388856) 2008 GD_{106}
- (389546) 2010 MF_{87} (ULA)
- (389792) 2011 UY_{79} (SYL)
- (390250) 2012 XW_{94}
- (390359) 2013 CO_{209}
- (390365) 2013 EJ_{94} (SYL)
- (390475) 2013 YJ_{129}
- (390861) 2004 RL_{319}
- (391153) 2005 YR_{95}
- (391163) 2005 YQ_{228}
- (391772) 2008 GH_{140}
- (392428) 2010 OQ_{45}
- (392662) 2011 UK_{256}
- (392695) 2011 WO_{56} (SYL)
- (393079) 2013 AU_{98} (SYL)
- (393217) 2013 ED_{17}
- (394065) 2005 XW_{60}
- (394089) 2006 BF_{36}
- (394785) 2008 HQ_{18}
- (394787) 2008 HC_{42}
- (395282) 2010 VR_{103}
- (395297) 2011 HA_{54}
- (395956) 2013 AX_{149}
- (396000) 2013 BH_{55}
- (396106) 2013 CF_{147}
- (396109) 2013 CK_{150}
- (396143) 2013 DA_{9}
- (396170) 2013 EJ_{112}
- (396701) 2002 TV_{297}
- (396739) 2003 RV_{19}
- (397122) 2005 WA_{6}
- (398113) 2009 UD_{90}
- (398212) 2010 NF_{105}
- (398263) 2010 TC_{40}
- (398370) 2011 SW_{98}
- (399117) 2014 DU_{113}
- (399271) 2014 HK_{73}
- (399460) 2002 PK_{169}
- (399605) 2003 WO_{103}
- (399982) 2006 BW_{235}
- (399984) 2006 BU_{263}
- (400508) 2008 KW_{42}
- (400750) 2009 VR_{63}
- (400989) 2011 BL_{22}
- (401293) 2012 DF_{80}
- (401958) 2002 RY_{248}
- (402841) 2007 LE_{1}
- (403196) 2008 PL_{9}
- (403199) 2008 RC_{56}
- (403432) 2009 SK_{183}
- (403757) 2011 BN_{28}
- (404181) 2013 CL_{100}
- (404588) 2013 LE_{35}
- (404953) 1996 VA_{25}
- (405058) 2001 TX_{16}
- (406328) 2007 QK_{12}
- (406780) 2008 RN_{11}
- (406796) 2008 TH_{103}
- (406797) 2008 TG_{141}
- (406800) 2008 US_{24}
- (406803) 2008 UX_{64}
- (406811) 2008 UA_{304}
- (407233) 2009 WU_{43}
- (407251) 2009 WD_{217}
- (407260) 2010 BP_{1}
- (407633) 2011 DF
- (407982) 2012 DV_{53}
- (408078) 2012 HE_{16}
- (408095) 2012 JV_{51}
- (408607) 2013 QF_{26}
- (408827) 2001 PF_{42}
- (410235) 2007 TL_{24}
- (410640) 2008 RC_{87}
- (410656) 2008 SW_{66}
- (410668) 2008 SC_{202}
- (410674) 2008 UY_{55}
- (410675) 2008 UZ_{66}
- (410683) 2008 VA_{56}
- (411078) 2009 VG_{84}
- (411098) 2009 WJ_{32}
- (411534) 2011 BM_{107}
- (411586) 2011 ED_{58}
- (411930) 2012 GX_{3}
- (411948) 2012 GR_{37}
- (412642) 2014 OJ_{185}
- (412710) 2014 OY_{295}
- (412879) 2014 QG_{24}
- (412952) 2014 QP_{244}
- (413115) 2001 VR_{133}
- (414050) 2007 RC_{211}
- (414337) 2008 SC_{218}
- (414356) 2008 TB_{75}
- (414371) 2008 UD_{134}
- (414383) 2008 UW_{368}
- (414384) 2008 VA_{73}
- (415007) 2011 GW_{20}
- (415019) 2011 HJ_{102}
- (415471) 2014 OL_{87}
- (415555) 2014 QG_{212}
- (415882) 2001 SJ_{340}
- (416229) 2003 AM_{55}
- (416233) 2003 AG_{90}
- (416569) 2004 EL_{28}
- (417921) 2007 RJ_{215}
- (417930) 2007 RW_{290}
- (417953) 2007 TM_{68}
- 417955 Mallama
- (417970) 2007 TL_{142}
- (418002) 2007 TR_{418}
- (418081) 2007 VW_{293}
- (418092) 2007 VD_{333}
- (418628) 2008 TW_{34}
- (418702) 2008 UY_{30}
- (418730) 2008 UE_{113}
- (418820) 2008 VF_{66}
- (419441) 2010 CS_{76}
- (419446) 2010 CZ_{100}
- (420243) 2011 HE_{68}
- (420260) 2011 JN_{20}
- (420623) 2012 HP_{69}
- (420628) 2012 HN_{73}
- (421170) 2013 RO_{45}
- (421218) 2013 SF_{31}
- (421356) 2013 TQ_{108}
- (421563) 2014 OQ_{190}
- (421735) 2014 PO_{41}
- (421928) 2014 QC_{239}
- (422129) 2014 QT_{421}
- (422329) 2014 SK_{209}
- (422711) 2000 SR_{325}
- (422820) 2002 CP
- (423837) 2006 PO_{21}
- (423873) 2006 RO_{45}
- (424395) 2007 YG_{62}
- (424418) 2008 AP_{86}
- (424886) 2008 VN_{80}
- (424943) 2008 YH_{106}
- (424947) 2008 YQ_{118}
- (424955) 2008 YR_{158}
- (425011) 2009 DC_{112}
- (425359) 2010 BM_{75}
- (425525) 2010 NL_{11}
- (425881) 2011 FT_{26}
- (426297) 2012 TD_{108}
- (426738) 2013 TW_{77}
- (426762) 2013 TR_{99}
- (426786) 2013 TC_{125}
- (426879) 2013 WP_{39}
- (426985) 2014 BO_{16}
- (427202) 2014 VR_{31}
- (427569) 2003 CR_{25}
- (427938) 2005 VE_{134}
- (428162) 2006 SX_{338}
- (428197) 2006 UZ_{161}
- (428216) 2006 VA_{48}
- (428251) 2007 BT_{21}
- (428510) 2007 YH_{21}
- (428540) 2008 CN_{7}
- (428977) 2008 YM_{160}
- (429739) 2011 OA_{6}
- (429883) 2012 TD_{14}
- (429936) 2012 TW_{287}
- (429951) 2012 UU_{112}
- (430309) 2013 XG_{3}
- (430354) 2013 YH_{142}
- (430364) 2014 AA_{34}
- (430897) 2005 SD_{16}
- (430915) 2005 SX_{278}
- (430923) 2005 TS_{59}
- (430954) 2005 UW_{513}
- (430957) 2005 UL_{517}
- (431322) 2006 WW_{132}
- (431355) 2007 CF_{49}
- (431646) 2008 AF_{99}
- (431660) 2008 CS_{29}
- (432937) 2011 UQ_{406}
- (433021) 2012 RB_{39}
- (433202) 2012 UX_{62}
- (433241) 2012 VB_{68}
- (433542) 2013 WT_{105}
- (433564) 2013 YM_{5}
- (434611) 2005 UU_{391}
- (434631) 2005 VB_{114}
- (434647) 2005 XW_{97}
- (434651) 2005 YJ_{27}
- (435434) 2008 CA_{129}
- (435485) 2008 GV_{4}
- (436033) 2009 KF_{11}
- (436681) 2011 SB_{141}
- (436728) 2011 UC_{177}
- (437303) 2013 CJ_{15}
- (437427) 2013 XO_{22}
- (437596) 2014 BZ_{1}
- (437696) 2014 DP_{31}
- (437738) 2014 EV_{19}
- (437741) 2014 EE_{31}
- (437994) 2003 UL_{12}
- (438295) 2006 BH_{232}
- (438675) 2008 GS_{43}
- (438891) 2009 TZ_{34}
- (438969) 2010 MJ_{71}
- (439005) 2010 WK_{62}
- (439194) 2012 BD_{9}
- (439199) 2012 BD_{121}
- (439365) 2012 YB_{9}
- (439403) 2013 BE_{46}
- (439428) 2013 EG_{77}
- (439689) 2014 JD_{60}
- (440093) 2002 TE_{353}
- (440125) 2003 SE_{254}
- (440729) 2006 AA_{71}
- (441414) 2008 GU_{36}
- (441835) 2009 UH_{53}
- (442500) 2011 WG_{2}
- (442594) 2012 CM_{40}
- (442598) 2012 DO_{9}
- (442968) 2013 CG_{134}
- (443099) 2013 HR_{150}
- (443656) 2015 FB_{77}
- (443805) 1997 WW
- (445251) 2009 QU_{53}
- (445258) 2009 RD_{29}
- (445259) 2009 RR_{50}
- (445265) 2009 SZ_{97}
- (445273) 2009 SL_{359}
- (445277) 2009 TB_{43}
- (445278) 2009 VC_{45}
- (445288) 2009 WO_{217}
- (445834) 2012 CX_{44}
- (446158) 2013 EK_{115}
- (446246) 2013 HT_{35}
- (446570) 2014 OX_{119}
- (446581) 2014 OM_{223}
- (446587) 2014 QP_{38}
- (446909) 2002 RQ_{80}
- (448429) 2009 UK_{105}
- (448432) 2009 VJ_{115}
- (448437) 2009 WS_{86}
- (448707) 2010 XV_{76}
- (449463) 2013 LR_{11}
- (449718) 2014 MP_{54}
- (451215) 2009 WS_{197}
- (451217) 2009 XE_{11}
- (451385) 2011 BY_{57}
- (452012) 2014 OC_{93}
- (452075) 2014 OW_{365}
- (453038) 2007 RH_{322}
- (453257) 2008 SE_{141}
- (453515) 2009 UM_{122}
- (454593) 2014 PC_{44}
- (454631) 2014 QR_{173}
- (454890) 2015 TL_{80}
- (454901) 2015 TF_{103}
- (455065) 2015 UG_{37}
- (455073) 2015 UQ_{44}
- (455157) 1997 YM_{3}
- (455243) 2001 SD_{225}
- (456748) 2007 TA_{51}
- (456783) 2007 TF_{174}
- (456815) 2007 TK_{372}
- (457264) 2008 RT_{33}
- (457339) 2008 SS_{203}
- (457383) 2008 TC_{44}
- (457514) 2008 VX_{66}
- (457572) 2008 YZ_{138}
- (458113) 2010 CP_{124}
- (458118) 2010 DC_{45}
- (458146) 2010 JH_{28}
- (458703) 2011 HU_{73}
- (458705) 2011 HH_{83}
- (458728) 2011 LH_{4}
- (459392) 2012 KK_{25}
- (459698) 2013 OV_{8}
- (459736) 2013 QA_{6}
- (459839) 2013 TN_{2}
- (459991) 2014 OE_{39}
- (460127) 2014 PM_{40}
- (460457) 2014 SF_{227}
- (460500) 2014 SN_{316}
- (460566) 2014 TA_{75}
- (460571) 2014 UX_{4}
- (460588) 2014 US_{20}
- (460600) 2014 US_{47}
- (460616) 2014 UK_{79}
- (460702) 2014 UQ_{209}
- (460873) 2014 WT_{137}
- (460935) 2014 WP_{237}
- (460950) 2014 WV_{267}
- (460975) 2014 WW_{322}
- (460990) 2014 WP_{346}
- (461018) 2014 WP_{401}
- (461094) 2015 BX_{38}
- (461107) 2015 BU_{222}
- (461117) 2015 DD_{145}
- (461152) 2015 TY_{114}
- (461568) 2004 GV_{78}
- (462116) 2007 RD_{117}
- (462221) 2007 WA_{33}
- (462533) 2009 AK_{40}
- (462545) 2009 BH_{155}
- (462787) 2010 KU_{39}
- (463358) 2012 ST_{40}
- (464050) 2014 WQ_{214}
- (464160) 2015 AQ_{1}
- (464239) 2015 CR_{10}
- (464325) 2016 AA_{109}
- (464894) 2005 QM_{142}
- (464912) 2005 TQ_{20}
- (465089) 2006 UF_{59}
- (465121) 2006 WP_{134}
- (465293) 2007 TR_{330}
- (465303) 2007 TR_{425}
- (465325) 2007 VY_{32}
- (465346) 2007 VB_{296}
- (465608) 2009 DL_{49}
- (465622) 2009 FS_{52}
- (465833) 2010 JX_{117}
- (466234) 2012 UR_{131}
- (466457) 2013 TZ_{107}
- (466630) 2014 WE_{19}
- (466817) 2015 BS_{147}
- (466824) 2015 BP_{180}
- (466869) 2015 BB_{484}
- (466909) 2015 EM_{46}
- (466953) 2016 AH_{128}
- (467613) 2008 AU_{116}
- (467820) 2010 JV_{48}
- (467828) 2010 OG_{107}
- (467999) 2012 UM_{46}
- (468380) 2016 FM_{56}
- (468518) 2005 TM_{122}
- (468560) 2006 UD_{335}
- (468926) 2014 WQ_{428}
- (468927) 2014 WZ_{467}
- (469168) 2015 MZ_{24}
- (469543) 2003 SP_{333}
- (469563) 2003 UZ_{337}
- (469934) 2006 AZ_{59}
- (470471) 2008 AP_{79}
- (471179) 2010 KW_{20}
- (471182) 2010 LD_{33}
- (471190) 2010 NQ_{56}
- (471191) 2010 NJ_{83}
- (471195) 2010 PS_{46}
- (471350) 2011 QY_{63}
- (471459) 2011 UA_{206}
- (471496) 2011 WN_{112}
- (471880) 2013 AO_{97}
- (471898) 2013 BJ_{25}
- (472228) 2014 FL_{64}
- (472722) 2015 FN_{71}
- (472964) 2015 GA_{39}
- (473067) 2015 HD_{94}
- (473184) 2015 KD_{69}
- (473188) 2015 KG_{71}
- (473338) 2015 TM_{122}
- (473585) 2015 XT_{237}
- (473602) 2015 XW_{260}
- (473828) 2016 ES_{117}
- (474560) 2004 BT_{1}
- (474633) 2004 UT
- (475335) 2006 AQ_{42}
- (475914) 2007 DR_{110}
- (475963) 2007 HG_{63}
- (476466) 2008 EO_{154}
- (476527) 2008 GY_{104}
- (477646) 2010 ME_{87}
- (477666) 2010 OG_{14}
- (477699) 2010 RA_{118}
- (477731) 2010 TX_{44}
- (478393) 2012 BK_{65}
- (478413) 2012 DG
- (479026) 2013 AP_{13}
- (479301) 2013 HD_{144}
- (479532) 2014 BS_{37}
- (480195) 2015 FZ_{339}
- (480349) 2015 KK_{13}
- (480662) 2015 OA_{40}
- (480680) 2015 PT_{39}
- (481032) 2004 YZ_{23}
- (482197) 2010 VG_{71}
- (482226) 2011 AP_{21}
- (482431) 2012 CH_{37}
- (482965) 2014 KK_{67}
- (482986) 2014 OD_{52}
- (483204) 2015 PW_{303}
- (483238) 2015 RY_{103}
- (483248) 2015 SK_{3}
- (483667) 2005 GT_{69}
- (483668) 2005 GH_{97}
- (483747) 2005 UG_{80}
- (484629) 2008 SS_{166}
- (484642) 2008 SY_{304}
- (484664) 2008 UE_{26}
- (484671) 2008 UZ_{99}
- (484679) 2008 UT_{162}
- (484690) 2008 UM_{223}
- (484905) 2009 RB_{45}
- (485366) 2011 DE_{18}
- (485380) 2011 FY_{71}
- (485992) 2012 KA_{17}
- (486654) 2013 QW_{8}
- (486666) 2013 QD_{87}
- (487236) 2014 PC_{11}
- (487285) 2014 QC_{25}
- (487286) 2014 QL_{25}
- (487331) 2014 QC_{174}
- (487386) 2014 QA_{301}
- (487848) 2015 TX_{99}
- (488323) 2016 UM_{130}
- (488352) 2016 WO_{11}
- (488553) 2001 TC_{253}
- (489072) 2006 AK_{17}
- (489406) 2006 VN_{25}
- (489409) 2006 VQ_{33}
- (489540) 2007 RO_{172}
- (489625) 2007 TU_{323}
- (489805) 2008 CS_{191}
- (489834) 2008 ER_{94}
- (490109) 2008 UW_{41}
- (490222) 2008 VC_{44}
- (491519) 2012 JN_{54}
- (491634) 2012 TL_{171}
- (492202) 2013 RF_{83}
- (492226) 2013 TF_{42}
- (493078) 2014 SB_{308}
- (493082) 2014 SZ_{314}
- (493116) 2014 TK_{16}
- (493136) 2014 TA_{45}
- (493239) 2014 UH_{90}
- (494012) 2016 AT_{121}
- (494075) 2016 BV_{71}
- (494138) 2016 CJ_{198}
- (494636) 2017 DN_{7}
- (495009) 2010 MW_{85}
- (495079) 2011 HE_{57}
- (495294) 2013 TY_{118}
- (495599) 2015 AK_{264}
- (495745) 2016 EF_{83}
- (496285) 2012 VP_{93}
- (496365) 2013 RJ_{32}
- (496417) 2014 BJ_{55}
- (496669) 2016 CT_{28}
- (497381) 2005 UU_{435}
- (497935) 2006 WN_{45}
- (497959) 2006 XZ_{49}
- (497975) 2007 CZ_{10}
- (498459) 2008 BN_{53}
- (498471) 2008 CA_{51}
- (498518) 2008 ER_{19}
- (500027) 2011 SD_{29}
- (500045) 2011 SQ_{248}
- (500053) 2011 UU_{123}
- (500055) 2011 UG_{147}
- (500062) 2011 UF_{271}
- (500786) 2013 ET_{87}
- (501419) 2013 YJ_{131}
- (501453) 2014 AZ_{40}
- (502595) 2015 CP_{9}
- (502733) 2015 DZ_{34}
- (502974) 2015 FA_{44}
- (503040) 2015 FR_{150}
- (503161) 2015 GS_{36}
- (503206) 2015 HJ_{25}
- (503257) 2015 KT_{78}
- (503265) 2015 LK_{35}
- (503714) 2016 JE_{23}
- (504034) 2005 UJ_{159}
- (504044) 2005 VB_{65}
- (504829) 2010 MR_{14}
- (505089) 2011 UH_{341}
- (505378) 2013 HJ_{153}
- (505622) 2014 FA_{51}
- (505632) 2014 JQ_{5}
- (505644) 2014 OF_{152}
- (506021) 2015 HO_{98}
- (506425) 2000 DQ_{110}
- (506598) 2005 YQ_{264}
- (506787) 2007 BM_{2}
- (507185) 2010 PT_{43}
- (507209) 2010 UG_{49}
- (507311) 2011 QP_{21}
- (507315) 2011 QF_{40}
- (507359) 2011 WX_{64}
- (507361) 2011 WH_{124}
- (507563) 2013 AV_{45}
- (507602) 2013 CQ_{20}
- (507619) 2013 ED_{21}
- (507751) 2013 YP_{20}
- (507857) 2014 HC_{139}
- (508043) 2015 BW_{533}
- (508542) 2016 TN_{8}
- (509954) 2009 SN_{67}
- (510159) 2010 XF_{56}
- (510400) 2011 UF_{132}
- (511620) 2015 BR_{32}
- (512031) 2015 MG_{59}
- (512569) 2016 SN_{28}
- (512634) 2016 TA_{47}
- (512751) 2016 UB_{39}
- (512792) 2016 UJ_{77}
- (512863) 2016 VG_{18}
- (512900) 2016 WX_{47}
- (512934) 2017 AG_{19}
- (512953) 2017 FV_{157}
- (513019) 2017 UX_{50}
- (513093) 2017 WL_{22}
- (513156) 2003 SF_{314}
- (513172) 2004 RC_{61}
- (513688) 2012 BS_{55}
- (513708) 2012 FC_{11}
- (514304) 2015 TU_{284}
- (514811) 2007 TE_{280}
- (514893) 2008 RE_{110}
- (514924) 2008 UB_{122}
- (515683) 2014 OG_{402}
- (516069) 2015 TE_{232}
- (516099) 2015 TS_{366}
- (516314) 2016 YE_{10}
- (516685) 2008 TQ_{149}
- (517427) 2014 MR_{72}
- (517519) 2014 QQ_{452}
- (517890) 2015 SW_{24}
- (517904) 2015 TS_{104}
- (517971) 2015 TZ_{366}
- (518055) 2015 XC_{201}
- (518082) 2016 AB_{228}
- (518338) 2017 BH_{137}
- (518369) 2017 FS_{7}
- (518474) 2005 RQ_{52}
- (518509) 2006 FZ_{51}
- (518696) 2008 YT_{101}
- (518787) 2010 BP_{24}
- (518798) 2010 BU_{91}
- (518800) 2010 BD_{94}
- (518836) 2010 CO_{223}
- (518892) 2010 EJ_{173}
- (519075) 2010 LQ_{18}
- (519451) 2011 YE_{80}
- (519871) 2013 NC_{31}
- (519947) 2013 RO_{107}
- (520233) 2014 DL_{153}
- (520392) 2014 HZ_{207}
- (520513) 2014 LS_{31}
- (520557) 2014 MT_{77}
- (520597) 2014 OZ_{404}
- (520949) 2014 YA_{58}
- (521262) 2015 HP_{192}
- (521515) 2015 OB_{97}
- (521733) 2015 RS_{270}
- (521933) 2015 UH_{90}
- (522017) 2015 XN_{352}
- (522259) 2016 AG_{275}
- (522302) 2016 BV_{99}
- (522412) 2016 CH_{311}
- (522899) 2016 PM_{104}
- (522924) 2016 PK_{110}
- (523023) 2016 PL_{124}
- (523044) 2016 PM_{127}
- (523073) 2016 QX_{92}
- (523170) 2016 TE_{99}
- (523461) 2017 FM_{85}
- (524114) 2000 SB_{1}
- (524167) 2000 YR_{37}
- (524652) 2003 SE_{255}
- (524763) 2003 UC_{321}
- (525170) 2004 TK_{217}
- (525869) 2005 TX_{128}
- (525977) 2005 UU_{179}
- (526027) 2005 UP_{290}
- (526262) 2005 YV_{166}
- (526534) 2006 SB_{224}
- (526647) 2006 UB_{86}
- (526700) 2006 VE_{30}
- (526754) 2006 WZ_{179}
- (527616) 2007 VP_{320}
- (527986) 2008 ER_{97}
- (528767) 2009 AJ_{42}
- (529257) 2009 TW_{49}
- (529758) 2010 MG_{23}
- (529797) 2010 OA_{19}
- (531069) 2012 DN_{84}
- (531804) 2012 XV_{33}
- (531816) 2012 XA_{69}
- (531970) 2013 CM_{181}
- (531996) 2013 CP_{228}
- (532105) 2013 JV_{49}
- (533044) 2014 AP_{59}
- (533181) 2014 DM_{82}
- (533232) 2014 DX_{147}
- (533410) 2014 GC_{58}
- (533523) 2014 JO
- (533731) 2014 NY_{68}
- (533763) 2014 ON_{101}
- (535790) 2015 BC_{264}
- (535847) 2015 BO_{312}
- (536175) 2015 BU_{551}
- (536626) 2015 DG_{238}
- (537023) 2015 FR_{409}
- (537103) 2015 GU_{51}
- (537316) 2015 KD_{41}
- (537331) 2015 KY_{76}
- (537517) 2015 MR_{138}
- (537648) 2015 RL_{81}
- (539247) 2016 PQ_{12}
- (539273) 2016 PX_{85}
- (539698) 2016 TL_{97}
- (540082) 2017 OU_{31}
- (540155) 2017 QG_{14}
- (540392) 2017 SK_{48}
- (540895) 2017 XC_{32}
- (540935) 2017 XK_{41}
- (541010) 2017 XK_{63}
- (541559) 2011 SN_{150}
- (541658) 2011 UD_{273}
- (542103) 2012 TV_{10}

== See also ==
- List of minor-planet groups § Other groups out to the orbit of Jupiter
- Asteroid family § Cybele group
