= 1362 Griqua =

Main-belt asteroid

Discovery
- Discovered by: C. Jackson
- Discovery site: Johannesburg Obs.
- Discovery date: 31 July 1935

Designations
- Pronunciation: /ˈɡriːkwə/
- Named after: Griqua people (South African tribe)
- Alternative designations: 1935 QG_{1} · 1931 BN
- Minor planet category: main-belt · (outer); Griqua · background ACO

Orbital characteristics
- Epoch 23 March 2018 (JD 2458200.5)
- Uncertainty parameter 0
- Observation arc: 87.03 yr (31,788 d)
- Aphelion: 4.4123 AU
- Perihelion: 2.0213 AU
- Semi-major axis: 3.2168 AU
- Eccentricity: 0.3716
- Orbital period (sidereal): 5.77 yr (2,107 d)
- Mean anomaly: 16.650°
- Mean motion: 0° 10^{m} 14.88^{s} / day
- Inclination: 24.223°
- Longitude of ascending node: 121.34°
- Argument of perihelion: 261.82°
- T_{Jupiter}: 2.9490

Physical characteristics
- Mean diameter: 25.60±3.72 km 26.936±0.363 km 28.36±0.40 km 29.90±1.5 km 29.9±3.0 km 30±3 km 31.0 km (radiometric)
- Synodic rotation period: 6.891±0.0297 h 6.9±0.1 h 6.907±0.003 h 7 h (poor)
- Geometric albedo: 0.055 (radiometric); 0.0667±0.007; 0.07±0.01; 0.075±0.002; 0.082±0.013; 0.091±0.042
- Spectral type: Tholen = CP; B (S3OS2); U–B = 0.360; B–V = 0.720
- Absolute magnitude (H): 11.18; 11.18±0.10; 11.561±0.003 (S)

1362 Griqua, provisional designation 1935 QG_{1} is a dark, Jupiter-resonant background asteroid on an eccentric, cometary-like orbit and the namesake of the Griqua group, located in the Hecuba gap in the outermost region of the asteroid belt. The carbonaceous asteroid measures approximately 28 kilometers (17 miles) in diameter and has a rotation period of 6.9 hours. It was discovered on 31 July 1935, by South-African astronomer Cyril Jackson at Union Observatory in Johannesburg. The asteroid was named after the Griqua people in South Africa and Namibia.

== Orbit and classification ==
Griqua is an asteroid in a cometary orbit (ACO), with no observable coma but with a Tisserand's parameter of 2.95, below the threshold of 3.0 defined for main-belt asteroids. ACO's may be extinct comets. It is the namesake and largest member of the small dynamical Griqua group (known as the "Griquas"), a marginally unstable group of asteroids observed in the Hecuba gap, a resonant zone with the gas giant Jupiter (2/1J). Griqua itself is background asteroids and does not belong to any known asteroid family.

This asteroid orbits the Sun in the outermost asteroid belt at a distance of 2.0–4.4 AU once every 5 years and 9 months (2,107 days; semi-major axis of 3.22 AU). Its orbit has a high eccentricity of 0.37 and an inclination of 24° with respect to the ecliptic.

The body's observation arc begins with its first observation as 1931 BN at Lowell Observatory in January 1931, more than 4 years prior to its official discovery observation at Johannesburg.

=== Groups in the Hecuba gap ===
The marginally unstable Griqua group includes 3688 Navajo, 4177 Kohman and 11665 Dirichlet, while the stable 2:1 resonant group are the "Zhongguos", named after 3789 Zhongguo. The transition between these two groups, however, is not clear. The unnamed, third group in the Hecuba gap are strongly unstable. Their largest members are the asteroids 1921 Pala, 1922 Zulu and 5201 Ferraz-Mello, as well as 5370 Taranis, 8373 Stephengould, and 9767 Midsomer Norton.

== Physical characteristics ==
In the Tholen classification, Griqua's spectral type is ambiguous, closest to a common C-type asteroid and somewhat similar to a primitive P-type asteroid (CP). The asteroid has also been characterized as a "brighter" B-type asteroid in both the Tholen- and SMASS-like taxonomy of the Small Solar System Objects Spectroscopic Survey (S3OS2).

=== Rotation period ===
In November 2000, a rotational lightcurve of Griqua was obtained from photometric observations by Colin Bembrick at the Mount Tarana Observatory in Australia. Lightcurve analysis gave a well-defined rotation period of 6.907 hours with a brightness variation of 0.25 magnitude (U=3). In 2009, follow-up observations by Jean and Milan Strajnic (511), Alain Klotz and Raoul Behrend as well as observations in the S-band by astronomers at the Palomar Transient Factory in California gave a concurring period of 6.891 and 6.9 hours with an amplitude of 0.23 and 0.24 magnitude, respectively (U=2/2). The result supersedes a measurement of 7 hours made in the 1970s (U=1).

=== Diameter and albedo ===
According to the surveys carried out by the Infrared Astronomical Satellite IRAS, the Japanese Akari satellite and the NEOWISE mission of NASA's Wide-field Infrared Survey Explorer, Griqua measures between 25.60 and 30 kilometers in diameter and its surface has an albedo between 0.0667 and 0.091.

The Collaborative Asteroid Lightcurve Link adopts the results obtained by IRAS, that is, an albedo of 0.0667 with a diameter of 29.90 kilometers based on an absolute magnitude of 11.18, while fragmentary radiometric observations in the 1970s determined a diameter of 31.0 kilometer and a derived albedo of 0.055 (TRIAD). (Note: The TRIAD radiometric diameters and albedos (Tucson Revised Index of Asteroid Data). The radiometric observations used for the Tucson Revised Index of Asteroid Data (TRIAD) compilation consist of broadband radiometry at 10 microns (the N band) and 20 microns (the Q band). Observations from 1972 through 1978 have been used. The results are compiled in Morrison and Zellner (1979). References to the observation papers for each entry are given in the associated references file. The observations have been interpreted with the standard model described in Morrison and Lebofsky (1979), using the computer code of Jones and Morrison (1974). Further details of the analysis are described in Morrison and Lebofsky (1979).)

== Naming ==
This minor planet is named after the Afrikaans-speaking Griqua people, a mixed tribe of Bushman and Khoikhoi descent in Griqualand in South Africa and Namibia. The official naming citation was mentioned in The Names of the Minor Planets by Paul Herget in 1955 (H 24).
