= 1373 Cincinnati =

Asteroid

Discovery
- Discovered by: E. Hubble
- Discovery site: Mount Wilson Obs.
- Discovery date: 30 August 1935

Designations
- Named after: Cincinnati Observatory
- Alternative designations: 1935 QN
- Minor planet category: main-belt · (outer); Cybele · ACO

Orbital characteristics
- Epoch 27 April 2019 (JD 2458600.5)
- Uncertainty parameter 0
- Observation arc: 82.62 yr (30,176 d)
- Aphelion: 4.4958 AU
- Perihelion: 2.3457 AU
- Semi-major axis: 3.4208 AU
- Eccentricity: 0.3143
- Orbital period (sidereal): 6.33 yr (2,311 d)
- Mean anomaly: 98.044°
- Mean motion: 0° 9^{m} 20.88^{s} / day
- Inclination: 38.936°
- Longitude of ascending node: 297.47°
- Argument of perihelion: 99.148°
- T_{Jupiter}: 2.7190

Physical characteristics
- Mean diameter: 19.448±0.175 km 19.751±0.165 km 22.16±1.66 km
- Synodic rotation period: 5.2834±0.0002 h
- Geometric albedo: 0.119; 0.1518; 0.155
- Spectral type: SMASS = X k M
- Absolute magnitude (H): 11.20; 11.5

1373 Cincinnati, provisional designation 1935 QN, is an asteroid in a comet-like orbit from the Cybele region, located at the outermost rim of the asteroid belt, approximately 20 kilometers (12 miles) in diameter. It was the only asteroid discovery made by famous American astronomer Edwin Hubble, while observing distant galaxies at Mount Wilson Observatory in California on 30 August 1935. The rather spherical X-type asteroid has a rotation period of 5.3 hours. It was named for the Cincinnati Observatory.

== Orbit and classification ==
Cincinnati orbits the Sun in the outermost asteroid belt at a distance of 2.3–4.5 AU once every 6 years and 4 months (2,311 days; semi-major axis of 3.42 AU). Its orbit has an eccentricity of 0.31 and an inclination of 39° with respect to the ecliptic. The body's observation arc begins with its official discovery observation at Mount Wilson in August 1935.

Cincinnati, a non-family asteroid of the main belt's background population, is located in the orbital region of the Cybele asteroids, the last outpost of an extended asteroid belt beyond the Hecuba-gap asteroids. Due to its high inclination, and contrary to all other Cybele asteroids, Cincinnati is the only one that is above the center of the ν_{6} secular resonance with Saturn. The asteroid's high inclination and eccentricity also results in a Tisserand's parameter (T_{Jupiter}) of 2.719, which makes it a true asteroid in cometary orbit (ACO) for having a T_{Jupiter} value below 3.

== Naming ==
Recommended by the Minor Planet Center, this minor planet was named after the Cincinnati Observatory, whose staff provided most of the orbit computations. (From 1947 to 1978, the Minor Planet Center was located in Cincinnati.) The official naming citation was published by the Minor Planet Center on 31 January 1962 (M.P.C. 2116).

== Physical characteristics ==
In the SMASS classification, Cincinnati is a Xk-type, a subtype that transitions from the X-type to the uncommon K-type asteroids, while the Wide-field Infrared Survey Explorer classifies it as a metallic M-type asteroid. By 2014, Cincinnati is the only of three Cybele asteroids for which a spectral type has been determined; the other two are 522 Helga and 692 Hippodamia, an X- and S-type, respectively.

=== Rotation period ===
In January 2018, a rotational lightcurve of Cincinnati was obtained from photometric observations by Henk de Groot. Lightcurve analysis gave a rotation period of 5.2834±0.0002 hours and a brightness variation of 0.10 magnitude (U=2+). The low brightness amplitude is indicative that is asteroid is rather spherical than elongated in shape.

Alternative period determinations were made by French amateur astronomer René Roy (5.274 h; Δ0.21 mag) in August 2004 (U=2). Two more lightcurves were obtained by Brian Warner at this Palmer Divide Observatory in Colorado, United States, in August 2004 and August 2010, who measured a period of 4.930 and 5.28 hours with an amplitude of 0.11 and 0.14 magnitude, respectively. (Note: Lightcurve plot of (1373) Cincinnati, Palmer Divide Observatory (716), B. D. Warner (2010). Summary figures at the LCDB.)

=== Diameter and albedo ===
According to the survey carried out by the NEOWISE mission of NASA's WISE telescope, Cincinnati measures between 19.4 and 19.8 kilometers in diameter and its surface has an albedo of 0.15–0.16, while the Japanese Akari satellite determined a diameter of 22.16 kilometers with an albedo of 0.12. The Collaborative Asteroid Lightcurve Link assumes a standard albedo for a carbonaceous asteroid of 0.057 and calculates a diameter of 27.9 kilometers based on an absolute magnitude of 11.5.
