= Griqua =

Griqua may refer to:

- Griqua people, of South Africa
- Griqua language or Xiri language, their endangered Khoi language
- Griquas (rugby), a South African rugby team
- 1362 Griqua, an outer main-belt asteroid
- Griqua asteroid, dynamical group of asteroids
