= 1373 (disambiguation) =

1373 can refer to:

- The year 1373
- 1373 (number), the natural number following 1372 and preceding 1374.
- United Nations Security Council Resolution 1373
- 1373 Cincinnati, an asteroid
