= 1091 Spiraea =

Carbonaceous main-belt asteroid

Discovery
- Discovered by: K. Reinmuth
- Discovery site: Heidelberg Obs.
- Discovery date: 26 February 1928

Designations
- Pronunciation: /spaɪˈriːə/
- Named after: Spiraea (genus of shrubs)
- Alternative designations: 1928 DT · 1934 CN_{1} 1938 UR · 1964 XH
- Minor planet category: main-belt · (outer); Cybele · background

Orbital characteristics
- Epoch 4 September 2017 (JD 2458000.5)
- Uncertainty parameter 0
- Observation arc: 89.27 yr (32,606 days)
- Aphelion: 3.6484 AU
- Perihelion: 3.2077 AU
- Semi-major axis: 3.4281 AU
- Eccentricity: 0.0643
- Orbital period (sidereal): 6.35 yr (2,318 days)
- Mean anomaly: 110.37°
- Mean motion: 0° 9^{m} 19.08^{s} / day
- Inclination: 1.1554°
- Longitude of ascending node: 80.790°
- Argument of perihelion: 12.062°

Physical characteristics
- Dimensions: 32.78 km (calculated); 35.178±0.108 km 39.92±17.85 km 40.280±0.455 km 40.52±0.91 km
- Synodic rotation period: 7.01±0.43 h
- Geometric albedo: 0.05±0.06; 0.057 (assumed); 0.0627±0.0106; 0.063±0.003; 0.091±0.025
- Spectral type: C (assumed)
- Absolute magnitude (H): 10.60 · 10.70±0.08 (R) · 10.8 · 11.00±0.14 · 11.15 · 11.18

1091 Spiraea, provisional designation 1928 DT, is a carbonaceous Cybele asteroid from the outer regions of the asteroid belt, approximately 36 kilometers in diameter. It was discovered on 26 February 1928, by astronomer Karl Reinmuth at the Heidelberg-Königstuhl State Observatory in southwest Germany. The asteroid was named after Spiraea, a genus of plants.

== Orbit and classification ==
Spiraea orbits the Sun in the outer main-belt at a distance of 3.2–3.6 AU once every 6 years and 4 months (2,318 days). Its orbit has an eccentricity of 0.06 and an inclination of 1° with respect to the ecliptic. With these orbital parameters, it belongs to the Cybele asteroids, a dynamical group near the 4:7 resonance with Jupiter and named after one of the largest asteroids, 65 Cybele. It is, however, a non-family asteroid from the main belt's background population when applying the hierarchical clustering method (Nesvorny, Novakovic, Knezevic and Milani) to its proper orbital elements.

The body's observation arc begins with its identification as 1934 CN_{1} at Uccle Observatory in February 1934, almost six years after its official discovery observation at Heidelberg.

== Physical characteristics ==
Spiraea is an assumed carbonaceous C-type asteroid.

=== Rotation period ===
In December 2014, a fragmentary rotational lightcurve of Spiraea was obtained from photometric observations in the R-band by astronomers at the Palomar Transient Factory in California. Lightcurve analysis gave a rotation period of 7.01 hours with a brightness amplitude of 0.03 magnitude (U=1+).

=== Diameter and albedo ===
According to the surveys carried out by the Japanese Akari satellite and the NEOWISE mission of NASA's Wide-field Infrared Survey Explorer, Spiraea measures between 35.178 and 40.52 kilometers in diameter and its surface has an albedo between 0.05 and 0.091.

The Collaborative Asteroid Lightcurve Link assumes a standard albedo for carbonaceous asteroids of 0.057 and calculates a diameter of 32.78 kilometers based on an absolute magnitude of 11.15.

== Naming ==
This minor planet was named after Spiraea, a genus of shrubs of the rose family (Rosaceae), with small white or pink flowers. The official naming citation was mentioned in The Names of the Minor Planets by Paul Herget in 1955 (H 103).

=== Reinmuth's flowers ===
Due to his many discoveries, Karl Reinmuth submitted a large list of 66 newly named asteroids in the early 1930s. The list covered his discoveries with numbers between (1009) and (1200). This list also contained a sequence of 28 asteroids, starting with 1054 Forsytia, that were all named after plants, in particular flowering plants (also see list of minor planets named after animals and plants).
