= Hecuba-gap asteroid =

Group of main-belt asteroids

A Hecuba-gap asteroid is a member of a dynamical group of resonant asteroids located in the Hecuba gap at 3.27 AU – one of the largest Kirkwood gaps in the asteroid belt, which is considered the borderline separating the outer main belt asteroids from the Cybeles. A Hecuba-gap asteroid stays in a 2:1 mean motion resonance with the gas giant Jupiter, which may gradually perturbe its orbits over a long period until it either intersect with the orbit of Mars or Jupiter itself. Depending on the dynamical stability of an asteroid's orbit in the Hecuba gap, three subgroups have been proposed. These are the marginally unstable Griqua asteroids, with an estimated lifetime of more than 100 million years, the stable Zhongguo asteroids (more than 500 million or even 1 billion years), and an unnamed, strongly unstable population of asteroids with a dynamical lifetime of less than 70 million years.

Moving further out the Solar System, the asteroids in the Hecuba gap are followed by the Cybeles, as well as the resonant Hildas (3:2), Thules (4:3) and Jupiter trojans (1:1).

== Description ==
Both the Zhongguo (stable) and Griqua asteroids (marginally stable) are also described as the "long-lived" group with lifetimes over 70 million years in order to distinct them from the "short-lived" population. The division between the Griquas and Zhongguo into clearly distinct groups in terms of lifetime has also been questioned and follow-up studies have moved the threshold lifetime between the two long-lived groups from 500 million to 1 billion years.

=== Griqua asteroids ===
The Griqua asteroids (also known as the "Griquas") are a dynamical group of asteroids with marginally unstable orbits. The group derives its name from the asteroid 1362 Griqua. The Griquas are located in the Hecuba gap – one of the largest Kirkwood gaps in the asteroid belt at 3.27 AU – and stay in a 2:1 mean motion resonance with the gas giant Jupiter, which gradually perturbes their orbits over a long period until they either intersect with the orbit of Mars or Jupiter itself. The group has an estimated lifetime of 100 to (at least) 500 million years. Known members of the Griqua group include (articles in boldface):

- **1362 Griqua**
- **3688 Navajo**
- **4177 Kohman**
- **11665 Dirichlet**
- **13963 Euphrates**
- (24491) 2000 YT_{123}
- (28459) 2000 AW_{144}
- (29524) 1998 AE
- (35989) 1999 NF_{10}
- (86358) 1999 XB_{143}
- (104742) 2000 HY_{9}

=== Zhongguo asteroids ===
While the Griquas are asteroids in a marginally unstable orbit, the Zhongguo asteroids (or "Zhongguos"; named after 3789 Zhongguo) are in a rather stable 2:1 resonance with Jupiter. The group of 26 identified members, with a lifetime of more than 530 million (or even 1 billion) years, can be further divided into two clusters in the pseudo-proper element space:

- **3789 Zhongguo**
- (11097) 1994 UD1
- 11266 Macke
- **11573 Helmholtz**
- **14871 Pyramus**
- **(16882) 1998 BO13**
- (18888) 2000 AV246
- **22740 Rayleigh**
- (24514) 2001 BB58
- (26112) 1991 PG18
- **31249 Renéefleming**
- (31293) 1998 FP70
- (36140) 1999 RC168
- (37528) 1975 SX
- (37991) 1998 KZ5
- **(38984) 2000 UZ4**
- (39018) 2000 UM53
- (41262) 1999 XZ55
- 45511 Anneblack
- (71694) 2000 FN44
- (86343) 1999 XZ56
- (91182) 1998 RO49
- (102915) 1999 XT_{23}
- (130295) 2000 EF_{60}
- (138739) 2000 SF_{206}
- (146258) 2001 AO_{22}

=== Strongly unstable group ===
Related but distinct from the "long-lived" Griquas and Zhongguos, is the group of "unstable" Hecuba-gap asteroids:

- **1921 Pala**
- **1922 Zulu**
- **5201 Ferraz-Mello**
- **5370 Taranis** (AMO)
- **8373 Stephengould**
- **9767 Midsomer Norton**
- (159367) 1977 OX
- (23577) 1995 DY_{8}
- (26166) 1995 QN_{3} (AMO)
- (31339) 1998 KY_{30}
- (37237) 2000 WZ_{161}
- 65541 Kasbek
- (86367) 1999 XY_{223}
- (136620) 1994 JC
- (252002) 2000 EU_{170}
- (495832) 2000 JV_{60}

In 2005, further research expanded this group of 16 bodies with an additional 31 multi-opposition asteroids, that show life-times of less than 70 million years. It is also thought that approximately 25% of the short-lived population are "extremely unstable" with lifetimes of less than 2 million years.

- (55068) 2001 QX_{83}
- (57565) 2001 TB_{52}
- (82009) 2000 RF_{68}
- (83943) 2001 WK_{14}
- (86358) 1999 XB_{143}
- (95488) 2002 EV_{25}
- (97653) 2000 FH_{13}
- (108455) 2001 KD_{50}
- (114721) 2003 GG_{32}
- (114804) 2003 NS_{8}
- (114926) 2003 QW_{42}
- (115916) 2003 WB_{8}
- (116908) 2004 GT_{2}
- (121906) 2000 DB_{62}
- (140348) 2001 TK_{15}
- (162983) 2001 RP_{53}
- (166564) 2002 RB_{107}
- (182931) 2002 GQ_{1}
- (184922) 2005 UP_{497}
- (206310) 2003 HG_{38}
- (222927) 2002 LN_{53}
- (228994) 2003 WO_{87}
- (257379) 2009 RP_{55}
- (274786) 2008 VT_{75}
- (307464) 2002 WL
- (376874) 2001 VE
- (405132) 2002 JH_{36}
- (437994) 2003 UL_{12} (APO)
- (443805) 1997 WW
- (455157) 1997 YM_{3} (AMO)
- (506437) 2000 WL_{10} (APO)

Among the unstable population, some asteroids have such a high eccentricity with a perihelion of less than 1.3 AU, that qualifies them as a near-Earth object. These five bodies (with their current eccentricity taken from the JPL SBDB in parentheses) are 5370 Taranis (0.64), 1995 QN_{3} (0.65), 2003 UL_{12} (0.70), 1997 YM_{3} (0.66), 2000 WL_{10} (0.72).
