= 1922 Zulu =

Carbonaceous resonant asteroid

Discovery
- Discovered by: E. Johnson
- Discovery site: Johannesburg Obs.
- Discovery date: 25 April 1949

Designations
- Named after: Zulu (tribe)
- Alternative designations: 1949 HC
- Minor planet category: main-belt · (outer); 2:1 res

Orbital characteristics
- Epoch 16 February 2017 (JD 2457800.5)
- Uncertainty parameter 0
- Observation arc: 67.70 yr (24,727 days)
- Aphelion: 4.7945 AU
- Perihelion: 1.6775 AU
- Semi-major axis: 3.2360 AU
- Eccentricity: 0.4816
- Orbital period (sidereal): 5.82 yr (2,126 days)
- Mean anomaly: 187.91°
- Mean motion: 0° 10^{m} 9.48^{s} / day
- Inclination: 35.446°
- Longitude of ascending node: 226.53°
- Argument of perihelion: 31.395°
- Earth MOID: 0.7153 AU
- Jupiter MOID: 0.6296 AU

Physical characteristics
- Dimensions: 12.41±2.60 km 19.30 km (calculated); 20.561±0.321 km
- Synodic rotation period: 18.64±0.01 h 18.65 h
- Geometric albedo: 0.055±0.006; 0.057 (assumed); 0.16±0.05
- Spectral type: C
- Absolute magnitude (H): 12.2 · 12.27±0.24 · 12.3

1922 Zulu, provisional designation 1949 HC, is a carbonaceous asteroid in a strongly unstable resonance with Jupiter, located in the outermost regions of the asteroid belt, and approximately 20 kilometers in diameter. It was discovered on 25 April 1949, by South African astronomer Ernest Johnson at Union Observatory in Johannesburg, and named for the South African Zulu people.

== Orbit and classification ==
Zulu is one of few strongly unstable asteroids located near the 2:1 orbital resonance with the gas giant Jupiter, that corresponds to one of the prominent Kirkwood gaps in the asteroid belt.

It orbits the Sun at a distance of 1.7–4.8 AU once every 5 years and 10 months (2,126 days). Its orbit has an eccentricity of 0.48 and an inclination of 35° with respect to the ecliptic. The body's observation arc begins with its official discovery observation at Johannesburg, as no precoveries were taken and no prior identifications were made.

Zulu was lost shortly after its 1949 discovery, and only rediscovered in 1974 by Richard Eugene McCrosky, Cheng-yuan Shao, and JH Bulger based on a predicted position by C. M. Bardwell of the Cincinnati Observatory. Its orbit is quite highly inclined for asteroids in the asteroid belt, at 35.4 degrees. This may be related to its 2:1 resonance with Jupiter.

== Physical characteristics ==
In May 2002, a rotational lightcurve of Zulu was obtained from photometric observations by American astronomer Robert Stephens at the Santana Observatory in California. Lightcurve analysis gave a well-defined rotation period of 18.64 hours with a brightness variation of 0.11 magnitude (U=3). One month later, French amateur astronomers René Roy and Laurent Brunetto obtained another lightcurve with a concurring period of 18.65 hours and an amplitude of 0.09 magnitude (U=1).

According to the survey carried out by NASA's Wide-field Infrared Survey Explorer with its subsequent NEOWISE mission, Zulu measures 12.41 and 20.561 kilometers in diameter and its surface has an albedo of 0.055 and 0.16. The Collaborative Asteroid Lightcurve Link assumes a standard albedo for a carbonaceous C-type asteroid of 0.057 and calculates a diameter of 19.30 kilometers with an absolute magnitude of 12.3.

== Naming ==
This minor planet was named after the South African Zulu people, in recognition of the tribesmen who devotedly worked at the Johannesburg Union Observatory. The name also closely relates to 1362 Griqua and 1921 Pala, which also received tribal names and librate in the 2:1 ratio of Jupiter's mean motion as well. The official naming citation was published by the Minor Planet Center on 20 February 1976 (M.P.C. 3938).

== See also ==
- Griqua group
