= 692 Hippodamia =

Main-belt asteroid

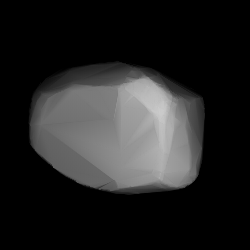
- Lightcurve modelled shape of Hippodamia

Discovery
- Discovered by: M. Wolf and A. Kopff
- Discovery site: Heidelberg Observatory
- Discovery date: 5 November 1901

Designations
- Pronunciation: /ˌhɪpədəˈmaɪə/
- Named after: Hippodamia (Greek mythology)
- Alternative designations: 1901 HD · 1941 HK
- Minor planet category: main-belt (outer) · Cybele family

Orbital characteristics
- Epoch 31 July 2016 (JD 2457600.5)
- Uncertainty parameter 0
- Observation arc: 113.83 yr (41575 d)
- Aphelion: 3.9570 AU (591.96 Gm)
- Perihelion: 2.8093 AU (420.27 Gm)
- Semi-major axis: 3.3832 AU (506.12 Gm)
- Eccentricity: 0.16962
- Orbital period (sidereal): 6.22 yr (2272.9 d)
- Mean anomaly: 147.27°
- Mean motion: 0° 9^{m} 30.204^{s} / day
- Inclination: 26.080°
- Longitude of ascending node: 63.487°
- Argument of perihelion: 54.267°
- Earth MOID: 1.89564 AU (283.584 Gm)
- Jupiter MOID: 1.62381 AU (242.919 Gm)
- T_{Jupiter}: 2.966

Physical characteristics
- Dimensions: 45.90±1.8 km 45.34±0.68 km 44.309±0.609 km
- Mean radius: 22.95±0.9 km
- Synodic rotation period: 8.98 h (0.374 d); 8.998±0.007 h 8.99690±0.00005 h
- Geometric albedo: 0.1785±0.015; 0.185±0.006; 0.1950±0.0194
- Spectral type: B–V = 0.860; U–B = 0.435; Tholen = S S
- Absolute magnitude (H): 9.18

692 Hippodamia, provisional designation 1901 HD, is a stony asteroid from the outer region of the asteroid belt, about 45 kilometers in diameter. It was discovered on 5 November 1901, by the German astronomers Max Wolf and August Kopff at Heidelberg Observatory in southern Germany. Nine years later, the body was rediscovered by August Kopff at its apparition in 1910.

== Description ==
The S-type asteroid orbits the Sun at a distance of 2.8–4.0 AU once every 6 years and 3 months (2,272 days). Its orbit is tilted by 26 degrees to the plane of the ecliptic and shows an eccentricity of 0.17. Based on its orbital elements, it is a member of the Cybele family. Named after the 65 Cybele, the group consists of relatively low-eccentric asteroids, which have a semi-major axis around 3.4 AU, dwelling in-between the Hungaria and the outermost Hilda family of asteroids.

According to the surveys carried out by the Infrared Astronomical Satellite, IRAS, the Japanese Akari satellite, and the Wide-field Infrared Survey Explorer with its subsequent NEOWISE mission, the body has an albedo between 0.18 and 0.20, and several independent and concurring photometric light-curve analysis rendered a well-defined rotation period of 8.99 hours.

The minor planet was named after Hippodamia, a figure from Greek mythology. It is believed the naming might have been influenced by the two letters of the provisional designation "1901 HD", a common practice of the discoverers. Hippodamia is the daughter of King Oenomaus of Pisa and wife of Pelops. She bribed Myrtilus, her father's charioteer, to remove a spoke from the royal chariot wheels so that Pelops could win her. Oenomaus had already defeated and killed 13 other suitors whom he had challenged to chariot races. After killing Oenomaus, Pelops murdered Myrtilus. These murders were primal sins, all paid for later by the many troubles of the house of Atreus.

692 Hippodamia has been observed to occult three stars, between 2020 and 2022.
