= 76 Freia =

Large main-belt asteroid

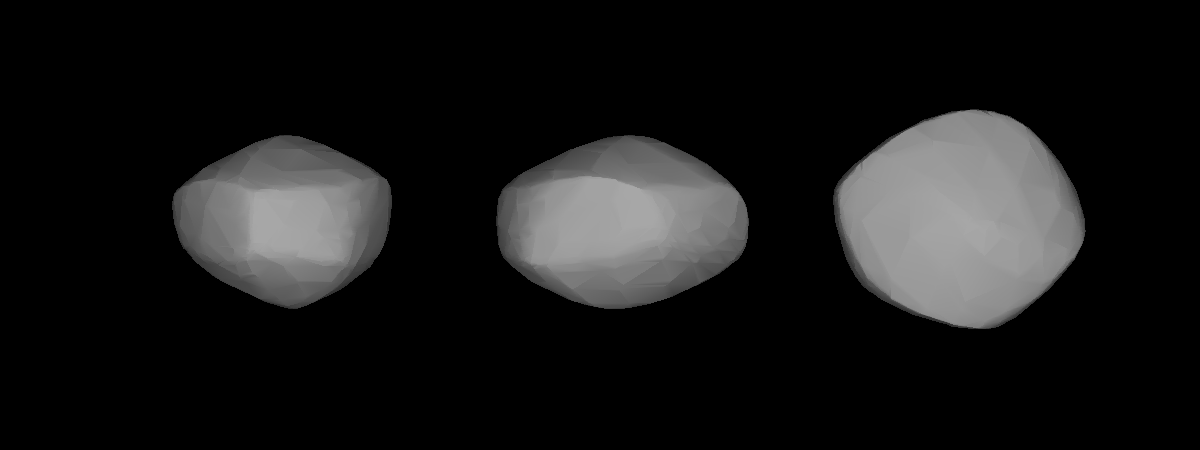
- A three-dimensional model of 76 Freia based on its light curve

Discovery
- Discovered by: Heinrich d'Arrest
- Discovery date: 21 October 1862

Designations
- Pronunciation: /ˈfreɪ.ə/
- Named after: Freyja
- Minor planet category: Outer main belt (Cybele)
- Adjectives: Freian

Orbital characteristics
- Epoch 9 June 2026 (JD 2461200.5)
- Uncertainty parameter 0
- Aphelion: 3.9800 AU
- Perihelion: 2.8368 AU
- Semi-major axis: 3.4084 AU
- Eccentricity: 0.1677
- Orbital period (sidereal): 2298.41 d (6.2927 yr)
- Average orbital speed: 16.00 km/s
- Mean anomaly: 330.760°
- Inclination: 2.1236°
- Longitude of ascending node: 204.271°
- Argument of perihelion: 252.284°
- T_{Jupiter}: 3.121

Physical characteristics
- Dimensions: 167.87±8.73 km (composite estimate); 183.7±4 km
- Mass: (3.09±0.51)×10^{18} kg (Note: Calculated from its standard gravitational parameter GM = 0.206±0.034 km^{3}/s^{2}.)
- Mean density: 1.92 g/cm^{3} (Note: Assuming a diameter of 145 km.)
- Equatorial surface gravity: 0.0513 m/s^{2}
- Equatorial escape velocity: 0.0971 km/s
- Synodic rotation period: 9.968240±0.000009 h
- Geometric albedo: 0.036
- Spectral type: CP
- Absolute magnitude (H): 7.90

76 Freia is a very large main-belt asteroid. It orbits in the outer part of the asteroid belt and is classified as a Cybele asteroid. Its composition is very primitive and it is extremely dark in color. Freia was discovered by the astronomer Heinrich d'Arrest on 21 October 1862, in Copenhagen, Denmark. It was his first and only asteroid discovery. It is named after the goddess Freyja in Norse mythology.

It is orbiting the Sun at a distance of 3.42 AU with a moderate eccentricity (ovalness) of 0.16 and an orbital period of 6.32 years. The orbital plane is inclined at an angle of 2.116° relative to the plane of the ecliptic. Based on infrared measurements, it has a diameter of 184 km. The asteroid has a Tholen spectral type of P.

The sidereal orbital period of this asteroid is commensurable with that of Jupiter, which made it useful for ground-based mass estimates of the giant planet. A shape model for the asteroid was published by Stephens and Warner (2008), based upon lightcurve data. This yielded a sidereal rotation period of 9.968240±0.000009 h. They found two possible solutions for the spin axis, with the preferred solution in ecliptic coordinates being (λ, β) = (139°±5°, 25°±5°).
