= 570 Kythera =

Large main-belt asteroid

Discovery
- Discovered by: M. F. Wolf
- Discovery site: Heidelberg
- Discovery date: 30 July 1905

Designations
- Pronunciation: /kɪˈθɪərə/
- Alternative designations: 1905 QX

Orbital characteristics
- Epoch 31 July 2016 (JD 2457600.5)
- Uncertainty parameter 0
- Observation arc: 110.72 yr (40440 d)
- Aphelion: 3.8365 AU (573.93 Gm)
- Perihelion: 3.0101 AU (450.30 Gm)
- Semi-major axis: 3.4233 AU (512.12 Gm)
- Eccentricity: 0.12071
- Orbital period (sidereal): 6.33 yr (2313.5 d)
- Mean anomaly: 125.278°
- Mean motion: 0° 9^{m} 20.196^{s} / day
- Inclination: 1.7870°
- Longitude of ascending node: 223.762°
- Argument of perihelion: 156.205°

Physical characteristics
- Mean radius: 51.405±1.4 km
- Synodic rotation period: 8.120 h (0.3383 d)
- Geometric albedo: 0.0500±0.003
- Absolute magnitude (H): 8.81

570 Kythera is a large, main belt asteroid orbiting the Sun. It was discovered in 1905 by German astronomer M. F. Wolf at Heidelberg, and was named after the Greek island of Kythira that is associated with Aphrodite. The object is a member of the Cybele asteroid group.
