= 3688 Navajo =

Main-belt asteroid

Discovery
- Discovered by: E. Bowell
- Discovery site: Anderson Mesa Stn.
- Discovery date: 30 March 1981

Designations
- Named after: Navajo people (Native American)
- Alternative designations: 1981 FD
- Minor planet category: main-belt · (outer); Griqua · background ACO

Orbital characteristics
- Epoch 23 March 2018 (JD 2458200.5)
- Uncertainty parameter 0
- Observation arc: 36.40 yr (13,294 d)
- Aphelion: 4.7627 AU
- Perihelion: 1.6806 AU
- Semi-major axis: 3.2216 AU
- Eccentricity: 0.4783
- Orbital period (sidereal): 5.78 yr (2,112 d)
- Mean anomaly: 148.89°
- Mean motion: 0° 10^{m} 13.44^{s} / day
- Inclination: 2.5593°
- Longitude of ascending node: 19.974°
- Argument of perihelion: 137.91°
- Earth MOID: 0.6910 AU (269 LD)
- Jupiter MOID: 0.2392 AU
- T_{Jupiter}: 2.9960

Physical characteristics
- Mean diameter: 6.086±0.051 km
- Geometric albedo: 0.047±0.012
- Spectral type: P
- Absolute magnitude (H): 15.1

3688 Navajo, provisional designation 1981 FD, is a Griqua asteroid and a 2:1 Jupiter librator on an eccentric, cometary-like orbit from the outermost regions of the asteroid belt, approximately 6 kilometers (4 miles) in diameter. It was discovered on 30 March 1981, by American astronomer Edward Bowell at the Anderson Mesa Station near Flagstaff, Arizona. The dark P-type asteroid was named for the Native American Navajo people.

== Orbit and classification ==
Navajo is an asteroid in a cometary orbit (ACO), with no observable coma but with a Tisserand's parameter just below the defined the threshold of 3.0. ACO's may be extinct comets. It is a member of the small dynamical Griqua group, a marginally unstable group of asteroids observed in the Hecuba gap, a 2:1 resonant zone with the gas giant Jupiter. The group is named after its largest member, 1362 Griqua.

Navajo is a non-family asteroid from the main belt's background population. It orbits the Sun in the outermost asteroid belt at a distance of 1.7–4.8 AU once every 5 years and 9 months (2,112 days; semi-major axis of 3.22 AU). Its orbit has a high eccentricity of 0.48 and an inclination of 3° with respect to the ecliptic. The body's observation arc begins with a precovery taken at Siding Spring Observatory, just weeks before its official discovery observation at Anderson Mesa.

== Physical characteristics ==
Navajo has been characterized as a dark and primitive P-type asteroid. It has an absolute magnitude of 15.1. As of 2018, no rotational lightcurve of Navajo has been obtained from photometric observations. The body's rotation period, pole and shape remain unknown.

=== Diameter and albedo ===
According to the survey carried out by the NEOWISE mission of NASA's Wide-field Infrared Survey Explorer, Navajo measures 6.086 kilometers in diameter and its surface has an albedo of 0.047.

== Naming ==
This minor planet was named after the indigenous North American Navajo people, inhabitants of Arizona, New Mexico and Utah in the Southwestern United States. The official naming citation was published by the Minor Planet Center on 2 April 1988 (M.P.C. 12975).
