= 528 Rezia =

Outer main-belt asteroid

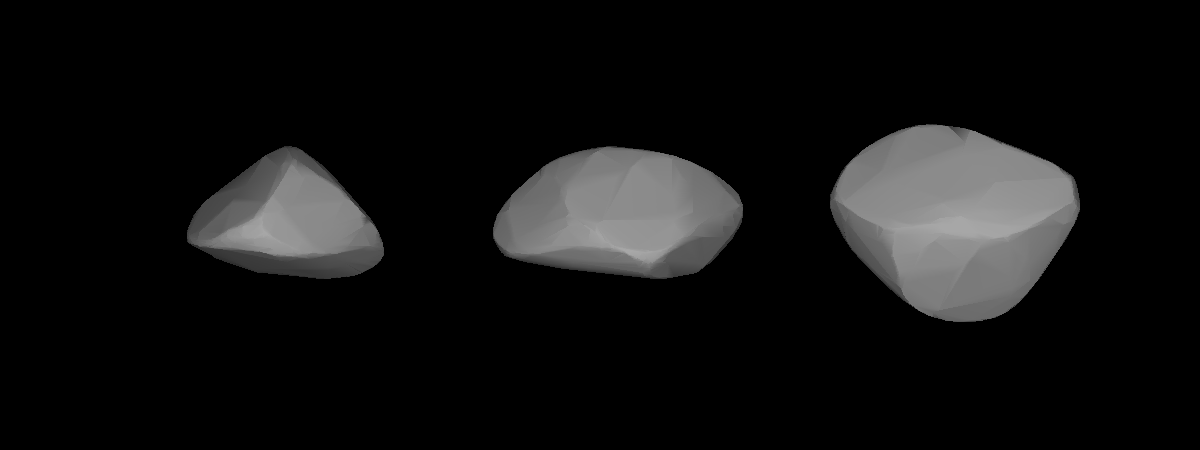
- A three-dimensional model of 528 Rezia based on its light curve

Discovery
- Discovered by: Max Wolf
- Discovery site: Heidelberg
- Discovery date: 20 March 1904

Designations
- Pronunciation: /rɛˈzaɪə/, German: [ˈʁeːtsiaː]
- Alternative designations: 1904 NS

Orbital characteristics
- Epoch 31 July 2016 (JD 2457600.5)
- Uncertainty parameter 0
- Observation arc: 112.08 yr (40937 d)
- Aphelion: 3.4643 AU (518.25 Gm)
- Perihelion: 3.3395 AU (499.58 Gm)
- Semi-major axis: 3.4019 AU (508.92 Gm)
- Eccentricity: 0.018346
- Orbital period (sidereal): 6.27 yr (2291.8 d)
- Mean anomaly: 136.691°
- Mean motion: 0° 9^{m} 25.488^{s} / day
- Inclination: 12.678°
- Longitude of ascending node: 49.641°
- Argument of perihelion: 338.786°

Physical characteristics
- Mean radius: 41.71±1.5 km
- Synodic rotation period: 7.337 h (0.3057 d)
- Geometric albedo: 0.0561±0.004
- Absolute magnitude (H): 9.14

528 Rezia is a minor planet orbiting the Sun. It was discovered by Max Wolf on March 20, 1904. It is named for a character in the 1826 opera Oberon by Carl Maria von Weber. Among the 248 discoveries by Wolf, he also discovered 527 Euryanthe and 529 Preziosa on the same day.

The mostly likely source for the name of the asteroid is the character Rezia in Carl Maria von Weber's opera Oberon, given that around 1904 the astronomer was frequently using the names of female opera characters for the asteroids he discovered.

In 1907, August Kopff's November 1 sighting of the provisionally designated 1907 AQ was instead determined to be 528 Rezia.

In 1987, it was reported that Rezia has a flat spectrum and IRAS albedo value p_{v}=0.54 ± 0.0004, which is very dark and consistent with a C-type asteroid.
