= 11665 Dirichlet =

Main-belt asteroid

Discovery
- Discovered by: P. G. Comba
- Discovery site: Prescott Obs.
- Discovery date: 14 April 1997

Designations
- Named after: Peter Gustav Lejeune Dirichlet (German mathematician)
- Alternative designations: 1997 GL_{28}
- Minor planet category: main-belt · (outer); Griqua

Orbital characteristics
- Epoch 27 April 2019 (JD 2458600.5)
- Uncertainty parameter 0
- Observation arc: 23.97 yr (8,756 d)
- Aphelion: 3.7625 AU
- Perihelion: 2.7963 AU
- Semi-major axis: 3.2794 AU
- Eccentricity: 0.1473
- Orbital period (sidereal): 5.94 yr (2,169 d)
- Mean anomaly: 298.55°
- Mean motion: 0° 9^{m} 57.6^{s} / day
- Inclination: 15.787°
- Longitude of ascending node: 215.21°
- Argument of perihelion: 309.39°
- T_{Jupiter}: 3.0980

Physical characteristics
- Mean diameter: 6.803±0.358 km
- Geometric albedo: 0.087±0.014
- Absolute magnitude (H): 14.1

11665 Dirichlet, provisional designation 1997 GL_{28}, is a Griqua asteroid and a 2:1 Jupiter librator from the outermost regions of the asteroid belt, approximately 6.8 kilometers (4 miles) in diameter. It was discovered on 14 April 1997, by astronomer Paul Comba at the Prescott Observatory in Arizona, United States. The asteroid was named after German mathematician Peter Gustav Lejeune Dirichlet.

== Orbit and classification ==
Dirichlet is a Griqua asteroid, a small dynamical group of asteroids located in the otherwise sparsely populated Hecuba gap (2:1 resonance with Jupiter), which is one of the largest Kirkwood gaps in the asteroid belt. It orbits the Sun at a distance of 2.8–3.8 AU once every 5 years and 11 months (2,169 days; semi-major axis of 3.28 AU). Its orbit has an eccentricity of 0.15 and an inclination of 16° with respect to the ecliptic. The body's observation arc begins prior to its official discovery observation with a precovery taken by Spacewatch in October 1994.

== Naming ==
This minor planet was named after German mathematician Peter Gustav Lejeune Dirichlet (1805–1859), who was the successor of Carl Friedrich Gauss and the predecessor of Bernhard Riemann at the University of Göttingen. His contributions include the first rigorous proof that the Fourier series converges. The official naming citation was published by the Minor Planet Center on 23 November 1999 (M.P.C. 36951).

== Physical characteristics ==
According to the survey carried out by the NEOWISE mission of NASA's Wide-field Infrared Survey Explorer, Dirichlet measures 6.8 kilometers in diameter and its surface has an albedo of 0.09. As of 2018, no rotational lightcurve of Dirichlet has been obtained from photometric observations. The body's rotation period, pole and shape remain unknown.
