= (38984) 2000 UZ4 =

Carbonaceous asteroid

(38984) 2000 UZ_{4}
Discovery
- Discovered by: LINEAR
- Discovery site: Lincoln Lab's ETS
- Discovery date: 24 October 2000

Designations
- Minor planet category: main-belt · (outer); Zhongguo · 2:1 res

Orbital characteristics
- Epoch 23 March 2018 (JD 2458200.5)
- Uncertainty parameter 0
- Observation arc: 20.39 yr (7,447 d)
- Aphelion: 4.1195 AU
- Perihelion: 2.5141 AU
- Semi-major axis: 3.3168 AU
- Eccentricity: 0.2420
- Orbital period (sidereal): 6.04 yr (2,206 d)
- Mean anomaly: 312.38°
- Mean motion: 0° 9^{m} 47.52^{s} / day
- Inclination: 0.4882°
- Longitude of ascending node: 59.710°
- Argument of perihelion: 357.34°

Physical characteristics
- Mean diameter: 4.87 km (calculated)
- Synodic rotation period: 19.20±0.390 h
- Geometric albedo: 0.057 (assumed)
- Spectral type: C
- Absolute magnitude (H): 14.6; 14.840±0.190 (R); 15.19±0.14; 15.29

(38984) 2000 UZ_{4} is a carbonaceous Zhongguo asteroid from the outermost regions of the asteroid belt, approximately 5 kilometers (3 miles) in diameter. It was discovered on 24 October 2000, by astronomers with Lincoln Near-Earth Asteroid Research at the Lincoln Laboratory's Experimental Test Site near Socorro, New Mexico, in the United States. The likely elongated C-type asteroid has a rotation period of 19.20 hours.

== Orbit and classification ==
2000 UZ_{4} is a non-family asteroid from the main belt's background population, and a member of the small group of Zhongguo asteroids, located in the Hecuba gap and locked in a 2:1 mean-motion resonance with the gas giant Jupiter. Contrary to the nearby unstable Griqua group, the orbits of the Zhongguos are stable over half a billion years.

It orbits the Sun in the outer main-belt at a distance of 2.5–4.1 AU once every 6.04 years (2,206 days; semi-major axis of 3.32 AU). Its orbit has an eccentricity of 0.24 and an inclination of 0° with respect to the ecliptic. The body's observation arc begins with a precovery taken by Spacewatch in February 1996, more than 4 years prior to its official discovery observation at Socorro.

== Physical characteristics ==
2000 UZ_{4} has been characterized as a carbonaceous C-type asteroid by Pan-STARRS' large-scale survey.

=== Rotation period ===
In January 2014, a rotational lightcurve of this asteroid was obtained from photometric observations in the R-band by astronomers at the Intermediate Palomar Transient Factory in California. Lightcurve analysis gave a rotation period of 19.20 hours with a high brightness amplitude of 0.70 magnitude, indicative of an elongated shape (U=2).

=== Diameter and albedo ===
The Collaborative Asteroid Lightcurve Link assumes a standard albedo for carbonaceous asteroids of 0.057 and calculates a diameter of 4.87 kilometers based on an absolute magnitude of 15.29.

== Numbering and naming ==
This minor planet was numbered by the Minor Planet Center on 28 March 2002, after its orbit had sufficiently been secured (M.P.C. 45198). As of 2018, it has not been named.
