= 13963 Euphrates =

Main-belt asteroid

Discovery
- Discovered by: E. W. Elst
- Discovery site: La Silla Obs.
- Discovery date: 3 August 1991

Designations
- Pronunciation: /juːˈfreɪtiːz/
- Named after: Euphrates (river in Mesopotamia)
- Alternative designations: 1991 PT_{4} · 1997 TO_{10}
- Minor planet category: main-belt · (outer); Griqua

Orbital characteristics
- Epoch 4 September 2017 (JD 2458000.5)
- Uncertainty parameter 0
- Observation arc: 45.98 yr (16,793 days)
- Aphelion: 4.1853 AU
- Perihelion: 2.4762 AU
- Semi-major axis: 3.3307 AU
- Eccentricity: 0.2566
- Orbital period (sidereal): 6.08 yr (2,220 days)
- Mean anomaly: 84.506°
- Mean motion: 0° 9^{m} 43.56^{s} / day
- Inclination: 0.9360°
- Longitude of ascending node: 227.18°
- Argument of perihelion: 129.72°
- T_{Jupiter}: 3.1090

Physical characteristics
- Dimensions: 9±1 km (est. at 0.06)
- Absolute magnitude (H): 13.9

13963 Euphrates (/juːˈfreɪtiːz/), provisional designation 1991 PT_{4}, is a resonant Griqua asteroid from the outer region of the asteroid belt, approximately 9 kilometers in diameter. It was discovered on 3 August 1991, by Belgian astronomer Eric Elst at ESO's La Silla Observatory site in Chile. The asteroid was named after the Euphrates River in the Middle East.

== Orbit and classification ==
Euphrates is one of very few bodies located in the 2:1 mean motion resonance with the gas giant Jupiter and belongs to the "marginally unstable" Griqua group.

It orbits the Sun in the outer main-belt at a distance of 2.5–4.2 AU once every 6 years and 1 month (2,220 days). Its orbit has an eccentricity of 0.26 and an inclination of 1° with respect to the ecliptic. A first precovery was taken at Palomar Observatory in 1971, extending the asteroid's observation arc by 20 years prior to its official discovery observation.

== Physical characteristics ==
Based on an absolute magnitude of 13.9, it measures between 4 and 10 kilometers in diameter, assuming an albedo in the range of 0.05 to 0.25. Since asteroids in the outer main-belt are mostly of a carbonaceous rather than of a silicaceous composition, with low albedos, typically around 0.06, its diameter is likely to be between 8 and 10 kilometers.

As of 2017, Euphrates' effective size, its composition and albedo, as well as its rotation period and shape remain unknown.

== Naming ==
This minor planet was named after the Euphrates river, that flows through northern Syria and Iraq.

It is one of the most historically important rivers of Western Asia. The Tigris–Euphrates river system, a major river system, is formed when the two rivers combine at Al Qurnah. The minor planet 13096 Tigris is named after the other river of this system. The approved naming citation was published by the Minor Planet Center on 6 August 2003 (M.P.C. 49280).
