= (16882) 1998 BO13 =

Asteroid

(16882) 1998 BO_{13}
Discovery
- Discovered by: LINEAR
- Discovery site: Lincoln Lab's ETS
- Discovery date: 24 January 1998

Designations
- Alternative designations: 1999 JC_{21}
- Minor planet category: main-belt · (outer); Zhongguo · 2:1 res

Orbital characteristics
- Epoch 23 March 2018 (JD 2458200.5)
- Uncertainty parameter 0
- Observation arc: 20.49 yr (7,483 d)
- Aphelion: 3.9425 AU
- Perihelion: 2.6761 AU
- Semi-major axis: 3.3093 AU
- Eccentricity: 0.1913
- Orbital period (sidereal): 6.02 yr (2,199 d)
- Mean anomaly: 57.356°
- Mean motion: 0° 9^{m} 49.32^{s} / day
- Inclination: 0.5370°
- Longitude of ascending node: 339.83°
- Argument of perihelion: 225.85°

Physical characteristics
- Mean diameter: 9.827±0.226 km
- Geometric albedo: 0.061±0.010
- Absolute magnitude (H): 13.5

(16882) 1998 BO_{13} is a dark Zhongguo asteroid from the background population in the outermost region of the asteroid belt, approximately 10 kilometers (6 miles) in diameter. It was discovered on 24 January 1998, by astronomers with the Lincoln Near-Earth Asteroid Research at the Lincoln Laboratory's Experimental Test Site near Socorro, New Mexico, in the United States.

== Orbit and classification ==
1998 BO_{13} is a non-family asteroid from the main belt's background population, and a member of the small group of Zhongguo asteroids, located in the Hecuba gap and locked in a 2:1 mean-motion resonance with the gas giant Jupiter. Contrary to the nearby Griqua group, the orbits of the Zhongguos are stable over half a billion years. According to Milani and Knežević, this asteroid is a core member of the unnamed asteroid family formed by the Zhongguo asteroid (11097) 1994 UD1.

It orbits the Sun in the outer main-belt at a distance of 2.7–3.9 AU once every 6.02 years (2,199 days; semi-major axis of 3.31 AU). Its orbit has an eccentricity of 0.19 and an inclination of 1° with respect to the ecliptic.

The body's observation arc begins with a precovery taken by Spacewatch in November 1996, or 14 months prior to its official discovery observation at Socorro.

== Physical characteristics ==
1998 BO_{13} has an absolute magnitude of 13.5. As of 2018, no rotational lightcurve for this asteroid has been obtained from photometric observations. The body's rotation period, pole and shape remain unknown.

=== Diameter and albedo ===
According to the survey carried out by the NEOWISE mission of NASA's Wide-field Infrared Survey Explorer, measures 9.827 kilometers in diameter and its surface has an albedo of 0.061, which is rather typical for the abundant carbonaceous C-type asteroids in the outer main-belt.

== Numbering and naming ==
This minor planet was numbered by the Minor Planet Center on 13 September 2000, after its orbit had sufficiently been secured (M.P.C. 41165). As of 2018, it has not been named.
