= 522 Helga =

Large main-belt asteroid

Discovery
- Discovered by: Max Wolf
- Discovery site: Heidelberg Observatory
- Discovery date: 10 January 1904

Designations
- Pronunciation: German: [ˈhɛlɡaː]
- Alternative designations: 1904 NC

Orbital characteristics
- Epoch 31 July 2016 (JD 2457600.5)
- Uncertainty parameter 0
- Observation arc: 114.65 yr (41876 d)
- Aphelion: 3.9372 AU (589.00 Gm)
- Perihelion: 3.3284 AU (497.92 Gm)
- Semi-major axis: 3.6328 AU (543.46 Gm)
- Eccentricity: 0.083794
- Orbital period (sidereal): 6.92 yr (2529.1 d)
- Mean anomaly: 200.06°
- Mean motion: 0° 8^{m} 32.424^{s} / day
- Inclination: 4.4174°
- Longitude of ascending node: 110.683°
- Argument of perihelion: 246.503°

Physical characteristics
- Mean radius: 50.61±1.75 km
- Synodic rotation period: 8.129 h (0.3387 d)
- Geometric albedo: 0.0388±0.003
- Absolute magnitude (H): 9.0

522 Helga, provisional designation 1904 NC is a large main belt asteroid (minor planet). It was discovered in 1904 by Max Wolf in Heidelberg. Helga is notable for being the first such object to be shown to be in a stable but chaotic orbit in a 7:12 resonance with Jupiter, its Lyapunov time being relatively short, at 6,900 yr. Despite this, its orbit appears to be stable, as the eccentricity and precession rates are such that it avoids close encounters with Jupiter. It forms part of the Cybele asteroid group.

522 Helga was "named by Lt. Th. Lassen, orbit computer" according to Paul Herget's The Names of the Minor Planets (note that computer does not refer to a personal computer, i.e. a machine, but rather to a person actually doing the necessary calculations).
