= 1921 Pala =

Resonant asteroid

Discovery
- Discovered by: T. Gehrels
- Discovery site: Palomar Obs.
- Discovery date: 20 September 1973

Designations
- Named after: Pala (Indian reservation)
- Alternative designations: 1973 SE
- Minor planet category: main-belt · (outer) background

Orbital characteristics
- Epoch 4 September 2017 (JD 2458000.5)
- Uncertainty parameter 0
- Observation arc: 43.52 yr (15,895 days)
- Aphelion: 4.5807 AU
- Perihelion: 2.0148 AU
- Semi-major axis: 3.2978 AU
- Eccentricity: 0.3890
- Orbital period (sidereal): 5.99 yr (2,187 days)
- Mean anomaly: 165.04°
- Mean motion: 0° 9^{m} 52.56^{s} / day
- Inclination: 19.192°
- Longitude of ascending node: 352.31°
- Argument of perihelion: 20.092°

Physical characteristics
- Dimensions: 8.2 km
- Absolute magnitude (H): 14.3 · 14.6

1921 Pala, provisional designation 1973 SE is a background asteroid in an unstable orbit located in the outer region of asteroid belt, approximately 8.2 kilometers in diameter. It is one of very few bodies located in the 2 : 1 mean motion resonance with Jupiter. It was discovered by Dutch–American astronomer Tom Gehrels at Palomar Observatory on 20 September 1973.

== Orbit and characterization ==
Pala is a non-family background asteroid from the main belt's background population. It orbits the Sun in the outer asteroid belt at a distance of 2.0–4.6 AU once every 5 years and 12 months (2,187 days; semi-major axis of 3.30 AU). Its orbit has an eccentricity of 0.39 and an inclination of 19° with respect to the ecliptic. The body's observation arc begins at Palomar with its official discovery observation.

It has a strongly unstable orbit near the 2:1 orbital resonance with Jupiter. The asteroid's orbit is expected to persist for another 18 million years.

Pala measures approximately 8.2 kilometers in diameter, while the albedo of its surface has not been estimated. As of 2017, the body's spectral type as well as its rotation period and shape remain unknown.

== Naming ==
This minor planet is named after the Indian reservation, Pala, located at the base of Palomar Mountain, believed to apply to an Indian tribe whose members have lived in the area for many centuries. The official naming citation was published by the Minor Planet Center on 20 February 1976 (M.P.C. 3938).

== See also ==
- 1922 Zulu
- 1362 Griqua
