= 5201 Ferraz-Mello =

Asteroid

Discovery
- Discovered by: Ted Bowell
- Discovery site: Anderson Mesa
- Discovery date: 1 December 1983

Designations
- Alternative designations: 1983 XF
- Minor planet category: main-belt; 2:1

Orbital characteristics
- Epoch 13 January 2016 (JD 2457400.5)
- Uncertainty parameter 0
- Observation arc: 27642 days (75.68 yr)
- Aphelion: 4.90994 AU (734.517 Gm)
- Perihelion: 1.82487 AU (272.997 Gm)
- Semi-major axis: 3.36741 AU (503.757 Gm)
- Eccentricity: 0.458077
- Orbital period (sidereal): 6.18 yr (2257.1 d)
- Mean anomaly: 201.107°
- Mean motion: 0° 9^{m} 34.2^{s} / day
- Inclination: 3.28409°
- Longitude of ascending node: 17.4554°
- Argument of perihelion: 114.742°

Physical characteristics
- Absolute magnitude (H): 14.7

5201 Ferraz-Mello is an asteroid from the asteroid belt, discovered on 1 December 1983 by Ted Bowell at the Anderson Mesa Station of the Lowell Observatory. It is one of very few Hecuba-gap asteroids located in the 2:1 mean motion resonance with Jupiter.
