= 4177 Kohman =

Main-belt asteroid

Discovery
- Discovered by: E. Bowell
- Discovery site: Anderson Mesa Stn.
- Discovery date: 21 September 1987

Designations
- Named after: Truman P. Kohman (American nuclear chemist)
- Alternative designations: 1987 SS_{1}
- Minor planet category: main-belt · (outer); Griqua · (2:1 res)

Orbital characteristics
- Epoch 23 March 2018 (JD 2458200.5)
- Uncertainty parameter 0
- Observation arc: 33.68 yr (12,300 d)
- Aphelion: 4.2465 AU
- Perihelion: 2.3574 AU
- Semi-major axis: 3.3020 AU
- Eccentricity: 0.2861
- Orbital period (sidereal): 6.00 yr (2,192 d)
- Mean anomaly: 23.119°
- Mean motion: 0° 9^{m} 51.48^{s} / day
- Inclination: 17.174°
- Longitude of ascending node: 210.69°
- Argument of perihelion: 157.88°

Physical characteristics
- Mean diameter: 11.059±0.229 km
- Geometric albedo: 0.120±0.033
- Absolute magnitude (H): 13.0

4177 Kohman, provisional designation 1987 SS_{1}, is a resonant Griqua asteroid from the outermost regions of the asteroid belt, approximately 11 kilometers (6.8 miles) in diameter. It was discovered on 21 September 1987, by American astronomer Edward Bowell at the Anderson Mesa Station of the Lowell Observatory near Flagstaff, Arizona, in the United States. The asteroid was named for American nuclear chemist Truman Kohman.

== Orbit and classification ==
Kohman is a non-family asteroid from the main belt's background population, and a member of the small group of Griqua asteroids, located in the Hecuba gap and locked in a 2:1 mean-motion resonance with the gas giant Jupiter. Contrary to the nearby Zhongguo asteroids, the orbits of the Griquas are less stable with a much shorter lifetime.

It orbits the Sun in the outer main-belt at a distance of 2.4–4.2 AU once every 6.00 years (2,192 days; semi-major axis of 3.3 AU). Its orbit has an eccentricity of 0.29 and an inclination of 17° with respect to the ecliptic. The body's observation arc begins with a precovery taken at the Siding Spring Observatory in May 1984, more than 3 years prior to its official discovery observation at Anderson Mesa.

== Physical characteristics ==
Kohman has an absolute magnitude of 13.0. As of 2018, no rotational lightcurve for this has been obtained from photometric observations. The body's rotation period, pole and shape remain unknown.

=== Diameter and albedo ===
According to the survey carried out by the NEOWISE mission of NASA's Wide-field Infrared Survey Explorer, Kohman measures 11.06 kilometers in diameter and its surface has an albedo of 0.12.

== Naming ==
This minor planet was named after Truman Paul Kohman (1916–2010), American professor of nuclear chemistry at Carnegie Mellon University who co-discovered in 1954 the nuclide aluminium-26, which has since been studied in meteorites and given important information about the early history of the Solar System. In 1947 he coined the word nuclide to describe an atom with given numbers of protons and neutrons in its nucleus. Kohman was also an ardent amateur astronomer.

The official naming citation was published by the Minor Planet Center on 23 May 2000 (M.P.C. 40700).
