= 65 Cybele =

Outer main-belt asteroid

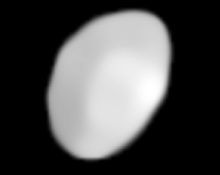
- VLT-SPHERE image of Cybele

Discovery
- Discovered by: E. W. Tempel
- Discovery site: Marseille Obs.
- Discovery date: 8 March 1861

Designations
- Pronunciation: /ˈsɪbəliː/
- Named after: Cybele (Hellenistic deity)
- Alternative designations: 1949 YQ
- Minor planet category: main belt · (outer); Cybele
- Adjectives: Cybelean /ˌsɪbəˈliːən/, rarely Cybelian /sɪˈbɛliən/

Orbital characteristics
- Epoch 4 September 2017 (JD 2458000.5)
- Uncertainty parameter 0
- Observation arc: 155.98 yr (56,971 d)
- Aphelion: 3.8102 AU
- Perihelion: 3.0464 AU
- Semi-major axis: 3.4283 AU
- Eccentricity: 0.1114
- Orbital period (sidereal): 6.35 yr (2,319 days)
- Mean anomaly: 168.06°
- Mean motion: 0° 9^{m} 19.08^{s} / day
- Inclination: 3.5627°
- Longitude of ascending node: 155.63°
- Argument of perihelion: 102.37°

Physical characteristics
- Dimensions: 297 km × 291 km × 213 km
- Mean diameter: 263±3 km
- Mass: (1.48±0.18)×10^{19} kg (composite estimate) (1.452±0.043)×10^{19} kg (Note: Calculated from its standard gravitational parameter GM = 0.969±0.029 km^{3}/s^{2}.)
- Mean density: 1.55±0.19 g/cm^{3} 1.52±0.07 g/cm^{3}
- Synodic rotation period: 6.081433 h
- Geometric albedo: 0.059; 0.044; 0.050±0.005; 0.06±0.03; 0.06±0.04; 0.0706±0.003
- Spectral type: Tholen = P SMASS = Xc · X B–V = 0.690; U–B = 0.271; V–R = 0.400±0.007
- Apparent magnitude: 10.67 to 13.64
- Absolute magnitude (H): 6.58±0.06 · 6.62 · 6.88±0.26 · 6.95

65 Cybele is one of the largest asteroids in the Solar System. It is located in the outer asteroid belt. It is thought to be a remnant primordial body. It gives its name to the Cybele group of asteroids that orbit outward from the Sun from the 2:1 orbital resonance with Jupiter. The X-type asteroid has a relatively short rotation period of 6.0814 hours. It was discovered by Wilhelm Tempel in 1861, and named after Cybele, the earth goddess.

== Discovery and naming ==
Cybele was discovered on 8 March 1861, by German astronomer Wilhelm Tempel from the Marseilles Observatory in southeastern France. A minor controversy arose from its naming process. Tempel had awarded the honour of naming the asteroid to Carl August von Steinheil in recognition of his achievements in telescope production. Von Steinheil elected to name it "Maximiliana" after the reigning monarch Maximilian II of Bavaria. At the time, asteroids were conventionally given classical names, and a number of astronomers protested this contemporary appellation. The name Cybele was chosen instead, referring to the Phrygian goddess of the earth. (The previously discovered 45 Eugenia, 54 Alexandra, and 64 Angelina had nevertheless also been given non-classical names; 64 Angelina had also been discovered by Tempel, but its name stood despite similar protests.)

== Physical characteristics ==
The first Cybelian stellar occultation was observed on 17 October 1979, in the Soviet Union. The asteroid appeared to have an irregular shape, with the longest chord being measured as 245 km, closely matching results determined by the IRAS satellite in 1983 (see below). During the same 1979 occultation, a hint of a possible 11 km wide minor-planet moon at 917 km distance was detected, but has since never been corroborated. As of 2017, neither the Asteroid Lightcurve Data Base nor Johnston's archive consider Cybele to be a binary asteroid.

=== Diameter estimates ===
Mean diameter estimates for Cybele range between 218.56 and 300.54 kilometers. According to observations by the Infrared Astronomical Satellite IRAS in 1983, the asteroid has a diameter of 237.26 km. The NEOWISE mission of NASA's Wide-field Infrared Survey Explorer gave a diameter of 218.56 and 276.58 km. The largest estimates of 300.54 km is from the Japanese Akari satellite. In 2004, Müller estimated Cybele using thermophysical modelling (TPM) to have dimensions of 302 × 290 × 232 km, which corresponds to a mean-diameter of 273.0 km.

Observations in 2021 show that Cybele's present shape very closely matches what would be expected if it were in hydrostatic equilibrium, in contrast to the other large Cybele asteroids 87 Sylvia and 107 Camilla. This suggests a transition point between irregular small asteroids and equilibrium larger bodies at around 1.5 × 10^{19} kg, and makes it possible that outer Solar System bodies at least 260 km in diameter might have formed in equilibrium (note Saturn IX Phoebe, which at 212 km diameter probably formed in equilibrium). However, it is not certain if Cybele's current shape is its primordial one, or if it is the result of a large impact as on the very round 10 Hygiea and 31 Euphrosyne. Today no Cybele family is observable, but since Cybele orbits in a rather unstable region, any such family would be dispersed within 2 billion years. Cybele's larger density compared to Sylvia and Camilla does somewhat favour the first hypothesis, though. (Sylvia and Camilla experienced impacts, as evidenced by their satellites and by the Sylvia family.)

== Spectrum ==
Examination of the asteroid's infrared spectrum shows an absorption feature that is similar to the one present in the spectrum of 24 Themis. This can be explained by the presence of water ice. The asteroid may be covered in a layer of fine silicate dust mixed with small amounts of water-ice and organic solids.

== Recent occultations ==
On August 24, 2008, Cybele occulted 2UCAC 24389317, a 12.7-magnitude star in the constellation Ophiuchus which showed a long axis of at least 294 km. On 11 October 2009, Cybele occulted a 13.4-magnitude star in the constellation Aquarius.
