= 5370 Taranis =

Near-Earth asteroid

Discovery
- Discovered by: A. Maury
- Discovery site: Palomar Obs.
- Discovery date: 2 September 1986

Designations
- Named after: Taranis (Celtic mythology)
- Alternative designations: 1986 RA
- Minor planet category: NEO · Amor

Orbital characteristics
- Epoch 4 September 2017 (JD 2458000.5)
- Uncertainty parameter 0
- Observation arc: 29.93 yr (10,932 d)
- Aphelion: 5.4438 AU
- Perihelion: 1.2118 AU
- Semi-major axis: 3.3278 AU
- Eccentricity: 0.6359
- Orbital period (sidereal): 6.07 yr (2,217 days)
- Mean anomaly: 27.914°
- Mean motion: 0° 9^{m} 44.64^{s} / day
- Inclination: 19.131°
- Longitude of ascending node: 177.85°
- Argument of perihelion: 161.27°
- Earth MOID: 0.2196 AU · 85.6 LD
- Jupiter MOID: 0.3673 AU

Physical characteristics
- Dimensions: 2.30 km (derived); 3.6 km (Gehrels); 5.308±0.082 km 6.3±0.05 km
- Geometric albedo: 0.037±0.009; 0.051±0.009; 0.20 (assumed)
- Spectral type: S (assumed)
- Absolute magnitude (H): 15.2 · 15.56

5370 Taranis, provisional designation 1986 RA, is an asteroid and suspected dormant comet on an eccentric orbit, classified as near-Earth object of the Amor group, approximately 5 kilometers in diameter.

== Description ==
Taranis was discovered on 2 September 1986, by French astronomer Alain Maury at the Palomar Observatory in California, United States. It is one of very few asteroids located in the 2:1 mean-motion resonance with Jupiter. When at aphelion of 5.4 AU, the object is roughly the same distance from the Sun as Jupiter is when Jupiter is at aphelion. The unstable resonance with Jupiter is expected to last roughly 7.3 million years.

Taranis also is expected of being a dormant comet. On 10 September 2099 it will pass 0.1325 AU (19,820,000 km; 12,320,000 mi) from Earth.

This minor planet was named after the Gaulish god of thunder Taranis from Celtic mythology. The official naming citation was published by the Minor Planet Center on 1 September 1993 (M.P.C. 22509).
