= 9767 Midsomer Norton =

Asteroid

Midsomer Norton
Discovery
- Discovered by: Duncan Steel
- Discovery site: Siding Spring
- Discovery date: 10 March 1992

Designations
- Named after: Midsomer Norton
- Alternative designations: 1992 EB_{1}

Orbital characteristics
- Epoch 13 January 2016 (JD 2457400.5)
- Uncertainty parameter 0
- Observation arc: 10820 days (29.62 yr)
- Aphelion: 5.3091 AU (794.23 Gm)
- Perihelion: 1.4549 AU (217.65 Gm)
- Semi-major axis: 3.38200 AU (505.940 Gm)
- Eccentricity: 0.56982
- Orbital period (sidereal): 6.22 yr (2271.7 d)
- Mean anomaly: 293.763°
- Mean motion: 0° 9^{m} 30.492^{s} / day
- Inclination: 21.498°
- Longitude of ascending node: 331.381°
- Argument of perihelion: 231.104°
- Earth MOID: 0.542404 AU (81.1425 Gm)
- Jupiter MOID: 0.863658 AU (129.2014 Gm)
- T_{Jupiter}: 2.771

Physical characteristics
- Absolute magnitude (H): 16.4

9767 Midsomer Norton (1992 EB_{1}) is an outer main-belt asteroid discovered on March 10, 1992, by Duncan Steel at Siding Spring. It is one of very few asteroids located in the 2:1 mean motion resonance with Jupiter.

== See also ==
- List of minor planets
