= List of minor planets: 521001–522000 =

The following is a partial list of minor planets, running from minor-planet number 521001 through 522000, inclusive. The primary data for this and other partial lists is based on JPL's "Small-Body Orbital Elements" and data available from the Minor Planet Center. Critical list information is also provided by the MPC, unless otherwise specified from Lowell Observatory. A detailed description of the table's columns and additional sources are given on the main page including a complete list of every page in this series, and a statistical break-up on the dynamical classification of minor planets.

Also see the summary list of all named bodies in numerical and alphabetical order, and the corresponding naming citations for the number range of this particular list. New namings may only be added to this list after official publication, as the preannouncement of names is condemned by the Working Group for Small Bodies Nomenclature of the International Astronomical Union.

Near-Earth obj.	MBA (inner)	MBA (outer)	Centaur
Mars-crosser	MBA (middle)	Jupiter trojan	Trans-Neptunian obj.
Unclassified

== 521001–521100 ==
Designation			Discovery			Properties		Ref
Permanent	Provisional	Named after	Date	Site	Discoverer(s)	Category	Diam.	Ref
521001	2015 BV_{545}	—	January 29, 2009	Mount Lemmon	Mount Lemmon Survey	EOS	2.0 km	MPC · JPL
521002	2015 BU_{546}	—	November 24, 2009	Kitt Peak	Spacewatch	·	1.4 km	MPC · JPL
521003	2015 BE_{547}	—	February 12, 2004	Kitt Peak	Spacewatch	EOS	2.0 km	MPC · JPL
521004	2015 BT_{547}	—	March 13, 2007	Kitt Peak	Spacewatch	·	2.9 km	MPC · JPL
521005	2015 BS_{552}	—	March 11, 2005	Mount Lemmon	Mount Lemmon Survey	·	1.6 km	MPC · JPL
521006	2015 CV_{36}	—	November 7, 2008	Mount Lemmon	Mount Lemmon Survey	·	3.5 km	MPC · JPL
521007	2015 CD_{65}	—	September 10, 2007	Kitt Peak	Spacewatch	·	2.2 km	MPC · JPL
521008	2015 CW_{65}	—	December 26, 2006	Kitt Peak	Spacewatch	·	1.3 km	MPC · JPL
521009	2015 CW_{66}	—	July 10, 2005	Siding Spring	SSS	·	3.4 km	MPC · JPL
521010	2015 CB_{67}	—	February 10, 2011	Mount Lemmon	Mount Lemmon Survey	·	1.3 km	MPC · JPL
521011	2015 CM_{67}	—	January 22, 2015	Haleakala	Pan-STARRS 1	·	1.7 km	MPC · JPL
521012	2015 CS_{67}	—	December 21, 2014	Mount Lemmon	Mount Lemmon Survey	EUN	1.2 km	MPC · JPL
521013	2015 CC_{68}	—	November 9, 2007	Catalina	CSS	·	3.4 km	MPC · JPL
521014	2015 CD_{68}	—	August 21, 2012	Haleakala	Pan-STARRS 1	·	3.0 km	MPC · JPL
521015	2015 CF_{68}	—	February 10, 2015	Kitt Peak	Spacewatch	·	2.0 km	MPC · JPL
521016	2015 CG_{68}	—	October 28, 2013	Mount Lemmon	Mount Lemmon Survey	·	1.1 km	MPC · JPL
521017	2015 CK_{68}	—	February 18, 2010	Mount Lemmon	Mount Lemmon Survey	·	1.9 km	MPC · JPL
521018	2015 CM_{68}	—	January 31, 2006	Mount Lemmon	Mount Lemmon Survey	·	1.4 km	MPC · JPL
521019	2015 CO_{68}	—	January 21, 2015	Haleakala	Pan-STARRS 1	EOS	1.4 km	MPC · JPL
521020	2015 CP_{68}	—	September 4, 2008	Kitt Peak	Spacewatch	GEF	1.2 km	MPC · JPL
521021	2015 CS_{68}	—	September 21, 2012	Mount Lemmon	Mount Lemmon Survey	·	2.5 km	MPC · JPL
521022	2015 CT_{68}	—	February 2, 2009	Kitt Peak	Spacewatch	·	2.9 km	MPC · JPL
521023	2015 CB_{69}	—	August 24, 2007	Kitt Peak	Spacewatch	·	2.3 km	MPC · JPL
521024	2015 CN_{69}	—	November 26, 2009	Mount Lemmon	Mount Lemmon Survey	HNS	1.3 km	MPC · JPL
521025	2015 CR_{69}	—	November 10, 2013	Mount Lemmon	Mount Lemmon Survey	·	1.6 km	MPC · JPL
521026	2015 CU_{69}	—	January 27, 2015	Haleakala	Pan-STARRS 1	·	1.3 km	MPC · JPL
521027	2015 CB_{70}	—	January 25, 2015	Haleakala	Pan-STARRS 1	·	2.1 km	MPC · JPL
521028	2015 CG_{70}	—	December 16, 2009	Mount Lemmon	Mount Lemmon Survey	·	1.8 km	MPC · JPL
521029	2015 CJ_{70}	—	April 25, 2007	Kitt Peak	Spacewatch	·	1.6 km	MPC · JPL
521030	2015 CL_{70}	—	September 10, 2008	Kitt Peak	Spacewatch	·	2.2 km	MPC · JPL
521031	2015 CO_{70}	—	June 15, 2005	Kitt Peak	Spacewatch	·	2.9 km	MPC · JPL
521032	2015 CP_{70}	—	January 23, 2015	Haleakala	Pan-STARRS 1	·	1.2 km	MPC · JPL
521033	2015 CR_{70}	—	January 16, 2009	Kitt Peak	Spacewatch	THM	2.6 km	MPC · JPL
521034	2015 DJ_{20}	—	September 14, 2012	Catalina	CSS	·	3.1 km	MPC · JPL
521035	2015 DS_{176}	—	February 2, 2008	Kitt Peak	Spacewatch	V	660 m	MPC · JPL
521036	2015 DP_{198}	—	January 20, 2015	Haleakala	Pan-STARRS 1	H	370 m	MPC · JPL
521037	2015 DX_{215}	—	June 2, 2013	Kitt Peak	Spacewatch	H	480 m	MPC · JPL
521038	2015 DA_{232}	—	August 21, 2006	Kitt Peak	Spacewatch	·	2.9 km	MPC · JPL
521039	2015 DC_{234}	—	May 22, 2011	Mount Lemmon	Mount Lemmon Survey	KOR	1.4 km	MPC · JPL
521040	2015 DF_{235}	—	February 10, 2010	Kitt Peak	Spacewatch	EOS	1.8 km	MPC · JPL
521041	2015 DG_{235}	—	April 13, 2008	Mount Lemmon	Mount Lemmon Survey	NYS	820 m	MPC · JPL
521042	2015 DT_{235}	—	August 3, 2004	Siding Spring	SSS	·	1.3 km	MPC · JPL
521043	2015 DU_{235}	—	February 15, 2010	Kitt Peak	Spacewatch	·	1.4 km	MPC · JPL
521044	2015 DV_{235}	—	February 20, 2006	Kitt Peak	Spacewatch	·	1.7 km	MPC · JPL
521045	2015 DX_{235}	—	November 19, 2008	Kitt Peak	Spacewatch	·	1.6 km	MPC · JPL
521046	2015 DD_{236}	—	October 3, 2013	Haleakala	Pan-STARRS 1	·	1.0 km	MPC · JPL
521047	2015 DG_{236}	—	March 12, 2007	Kitt Peak	Spacewatch	·	1 km	MPC · JPL
521048	2015 DH_{236}	—	January 23, 2015	Haleakala	Pan-STARRS 1	·	2.5 km	MPC · JPL
521049	2015 DL_{236}	—	April 20, 2010	Mount Lemmon	Mount Lemmon Survey	·	3.1 km	MPC · JPL
521050	2015 DO_{236}	—	August 7, 2008	Kitt Peak	Spacewatch	·	1.1 km	MPC · JPL
521051	2015 DS_{236}	—	January 29, 2015	Haleakala	Pan-STARRS 1	EOS	1.7 km	MPC · JPL
521052	2015 DV_{236}	—	August 13, 2012	Haleakala	Pan-STARRS 1	·	1.3 km	MPC · JPL
521053	2015 DA_{237}	—	January 23, 2006	Kitt Peak	Spacewatch	·	1.7 km	MPC · JPL
521054	2015 DC_{237}	—	October 24, 2009	Kitt Peak	Spacewatch	·	840 m	MPC · JPL
521055	2015 DE_{237}	—	February 16, 2015	Haleakala	Pan-STARRS 1	KOR	1.3 km	MPC · JPL
521056	2015 DJ_{237}	—	November 2, 2013	Mount Lemmon	Mount Lemmon Survey	·	1.3 km	MPC · JPL
521057	2015 DK_{237}	—	January 7, 2010	Kitt Peak	Spacewatch	·	1.4 km	MPC · JPL
521058	2015 DZ_{237}	—	March 16, 2007	Kitt Peak	Spacewatch	·	870 m	MPC · JPL
521059	2015 DA_{238}	—	January 10, 2008	Kitt Peak	Spacewatch	·	530 m	MPC · JPL
521060	2015 DC_{238}	—	October 10, 2007	Kitt Peak	Spacewatch	·	1.6 km	MPC · JPL
521061	2015 DJ_{238}	—	May 7, 2006	Mount Lemmon	Mount Lemmon Survey	AGN	1.1 km	MPC · JPL
521062	2015 DL_{238}	—	August 19, 2006	Kitt Peak	Spacewatch	·	2.2 km	MPC · JPL
521063	2015 DN_{238}	—	January 6, 2010	Kitt Peak	Spacewatch	(12739)	1.3 km	MPC · JPL
521064	2015 DO_{238}	—	February 14, 2005	Kitt Peak	Spacewatch	·	1.9 km	MPC · JPL
521065	2015 DU_{238}	—	August 21, 2008	Kitt Peak	Spacewatch	·	1.0 km	MPC · JPL
521066	2015 DB_{239}	—	January 2, 2011	Mount Lemmon	Mount Lemmon Survey	·	760 m	MPC · JPL
521067	2015 DG_{239}	—	September 23, 2008	Kitt Peak	Spacewatch	·	1.5 km	MPC · JPL
521068	2015 DH_{239}	—	October 9, 2007	Kitt Peak	Spacewatch	EOS	1.7 km	MPC · JPL
521069	2015 DJ_{239}	—	May 3, 2008	Kitt Peak	Spacewatch	·	1.1 km	MPC · JPL
521070	2015 DK_{239}	—	January 26, 2006	Mount Lemmon	Mount Lemmon Survey	·	1.4 km	MPC · JPL
521071	2015 DL_{239}	—	September 13, 2005	Kitt Peak	Spacewatch	·	1.1 km	MPC · JPL
521072	2015 DP_{239}	—	January 1, 2014	Haleakala	Pan-STARRS 1	·	3.6 km	MPC · JPL
521073	2015 DQ_{239}	—	January 28, 2015	Haleakala	Pan-STARRS 1	·	1.5 km	MPC · JPL
521074	2015 DR_{239}	—	February 16, 2015	Haleakala	Pan-STARRS 1	·	1.5 km	MPC · JPL
521075	2015 DT_{239}	—	March 24, 2010	WISE	WISE	·	2.5 km	MPC · JPL
521076	2015 DG_{240}	—	December 23, 1998	Kitt Peak	Spacewatch	·	1.4 km	MPC · JPL
521077	2015 DK_{240}	—	April 24, 2011	Kitt Peak	Spacewatch	·	2.0 km	MPC · JPL
521078	2015 DL_{240}	—	November 7, 2008	Mount Lemmon	Mount Lemmon Survey	·	2.0 km	MPC · JPL
521079	2015 DM_{240}	—	October 14, 2013	Kitt Peak	Spacewatch	·	1.6 km	MPC · JPL
521080	2015 DY_{240}	—	January 29, 2015	Haleakala	Pan-STARRS 1	EOS	2.0 km	MPC · JPL
521081	2015 DB_{241}	—	January 19, 2015	Mount Lemmon	Mount Lemmon Survey	·	1.7 km	MPC · JPL
521082	2015 DF_{241}	—	January 26, 2015	Haleakala	Pan-STARRS 1	PHO	680 m	MPC · JPL
521083	2015 DJ_{241}	—	October 15, 2013	Mount Lemmon	Mount Lemmon Survey	·	1.6 km	MPC · JPL
521084	2015 DK_{241}	—	March 14, 2011	Kitt Peak	Spacewatch	·	1.4 km	MPC · JPL
521085	2015 DQ_{241}	—	October 20, 2012	Haleakala	Pan-STARRS 1	·	1.9 km	MPC · JPL
521086	2015 DR_{241}	—	February 18, 2015	Haleakala	Pan-STARRS 1	·	1.9 km	MPC · JPL
521087	2015 DW_{241}	—	October 23, 2004	Kitt Peak	Spacewatch	HNS	1.1 km	MPC · JPL
521088	2015 DY_{241}	—	March 19, 2010	Mount Lemmon	Mount Lemmon Survey	·	1.5 km	MPC · JPL
521089	2015 DZ_{241}	—	September 22, 1995	Kitt Peak	Spacewatch	·	3.2 km	MPC · JPL
521090	2015 DL_{242}	—	January 21, 2015	Haleakala	Pan-STARRS 1	·	1.0 km	MPC · JPL
521091	2015 DQ_{242}	—	April 6, 2011	Mount Lemmon	Mount Lemmon Survey	·	1.4 km	MPC · JPL
521092	2015 DT_{242}	—	January 31, 2009	Mount Lemmon	Mount Lemmon Survey	·	3.2 km	MPC · JPL
521093	2015 DV_{242}	—	October 28, 2005	Kitt Peak	Spacewatch	·	720 m	MPC · JPL
521094	2015 DX_{242}	—	January 31, 2009	Kitt Peak	Spacewatch	·	2.1 km	MPC · JPL
521095	2015 DY_{242}	—	May 31, 2011	Mount Lemmon	Mount Lemmon Survey	AGN	1.0 km	MPC · JPL
521096	2015 DG_{243}	—	April 19, 2007	Mount Lemmon	Mount Lemmon Survey	·	1.2 km	MPC · JPL
521097	2015 DR_{243}	—	January 16, 2015	Haleakala	Pan-STARRS 1	MAR	1.1 km	MPC · JPL
521098	2015 DS_{243}	—	November 13, 2007	Kitt Peak	Spacewatch	·	3.4 km	MPC · JPL
521099	2015 DT_{243}	—	February 20, 2015	Haleakala	Pan-STARRS 1	·	3.2 km	MPC · JPL
521100	2015 DD_{244}	—	November 24, 2008	Mount Lemmon	Mount Lemmon Survey	·	2.9 km	MPC · JPL

== 521101–521200 ==
back to top

Designation			Discovery			Properties		Ref
Permanent	Provisional	Named after	Date	Site	Discoverer(s)	Category	Diam.	Ref
521101	2015 DF_{244}	—	November 29, 2014	Mount Lemmon	Mount Lemmon Survey	·	3.5 km	MPC · JPL
521102	2015 DH_{244}	—	October 17, 2012	Haleakala	Pan-STARRS 1	·	2.7 km	MPC · JPL
521103	2015 DO_{244}	—	February 24, 2015	Haleakala	Pan-STARRS 1	PHO	700 m	MPC · JPL
521104	2015 DR_{244}	—	June 10, 2011	Mount Lemmon	Mount Lemmon Survey	·	3.1 km	MPC · JPL
521105	2015 DU_{244}	—	October 25, 2008	Mount Lemmon	Mount Lemmon Survey	·	1.4 km	MPC · JPL
521106	2015 DY_{244}	—	February 6, 2014	Mount Lemmon	Mount Lemmon Survey	·	2.4 km	MPC · JPL
521107	2015 DF_{245}	—	November 7, 2012	Haleakala	Pan-STARRS 1	EOS	1.7 km	MPC · JPL
521108	2015 DG_{245}	—	March 13, 2011	Kitt Peak	Spacewatch	V	640 m	MPC · JPL
521109	2015 DH_{245}	—	January 10, 2014	Mount Lemmon	Mount Lemmon Survey	·	2.0 km	MPC · JPL
521110	2015 DP_{245}	—	August 26, 2012	Haleakala	Pan-STARRS 1	·	1.2 km	MPC · JPL
521111	2015 DS_{245}	—	September 9, 2007	Kitt Peak	Spacewatch	EOS	2.3 km	MPC · JPL
521112	2015 DW_{245}	—	April 10, 2010	Kitt Peak	Spacewatch	·	3.0 km	MPC · JPL
521113	2015 DG_{246}	—	January 5, 2014	Haleakala	Pan-STARRS 1	·	2.0 km	MPC · JPL
521114	2015 DK_{246}	—	March 30, 2011	Haleakala	Pan-STARRS 1	V	520 m	MPC · JPL
521115	2015 DL_{246}	—	November 21, 2008	Mount Lemmon	Mount Lemmon Survey	·	1.6 km	MPC · JPL
521116	2015 DN_{246}	—	September 5, 2008	Kitt Peak	Spacewatch	PAD	1.3 km	MPC · JPL
521117	2015 DP_{246}	—	March 10, 2008	Kitt Peak	Spacewatch	·	830 m	MPC · JPL
521118	2015 DZ_{246}	—	October 5, 2004	Kitt Peak	Spacewatch	·	1.6 km	MPC · JPL
521119	2015 DA_{247}	—	November 10, 2009	Mount Lemmon	Mount Lemmon Survey	·	1.1 km	MPC · JPL
521120	2015 DC_{247}	—	April 9, 2003	Kitt Peak	Spacewatch	·	910 m	MPC · JPL
521121	2015 DE_{247}	—	October 27, 2009	Mount Lemmon	Mount Lemmon Survey	·	1.4 km	MPC · JPL
521122	2015 DG_{247}	—	March 31, 2008	Kitt Peak	Spacewatch	·	920 m	MPC · JPL
521123	2015 DL_{247}	—	January 22, 2015	Haleakala	Pan-STARRS 1	·	1.4 km	MPC · JPL
521124	2015 DQ_{247}	—	August 26, 2012	Haleakala	Pan-STARRS 1	(11882)	1.4 km	MPC · JPL
521125	2015 DR_{247}	—	October 18, 2012	Haleakala	Pan-STARRS 1	·	2.7 km	MPC · JPL
521126	2015 DT_{247}	—	September 19, 2006	Kitt Peak	Spacewatch	·	2.3 km	MPC · JPL
521127	2015 DW_{247}	—	September 4, 2008	Kitt Peak	Spacewatch	·	1.3 km	MPC · JPL
521128	2015 DK_{248}	—	April 17, 2009	Catalina	CSS	·	3.0 km	MPC · JPL
521129	2015 DM_{248}	—	October 21, 2012	Mount Lemmon	Mount Lemmon Survey	·	3.0 km	MPC · JPL
521130	2015 DN_{248}	—	February 24, 2014	Haleakala	Pan-STARRS 1	EOS	2.0 km	MPC · JPL
521131	2015 ET_{6}	—	February 2, 2012	Kitt Peak	Spacewatch	H	410 m	MPC · JPL
521132	2015 EF_{62}	—	December 1, 2014	Haleakala	Pan-STARRS 1	H	530 m	MPC · JPL
521133	2015 EG_{75}	—	January 20, 2009	Kitt Peak	Spacewatch	·	2.5 km	MPC · JPL
521134	2015 EN_{75}	—	January 21, 2015	Haleakala	Pan-STARRS 1	·	2.1 km	MPC · JPL
521135	2015 EP_{75}	—	January 24, 2014	Haleakala	Pan-STARRS 1	·	2.7 km	MPC · JPL
521136	2015 FS_{5}	—	January 10, 2007	Mount Lemmon	Mount Lemmon Survey	H	430 m	MPC · JPL
521137	2015 FD_{43}	—	March 17, 2015	Haleakala	Pan-STARRS 1	·	2.7 km	MPC · JPL
521138	2015 FK_{332}	—	January 2, 2009	Mount Lemmon	Mount Lemmon Survey	H	580 m	MPC · JPL
521139	2015 FX_{340}	—	June 30, 2013	Haleakala	Pan-STARRS 1	H	540 m	MPC · JPL
521140	2015 FZ_{345}	—	October 7, 2008	Catalina	CSS	H	510 m	MPC · JPL
521141	2015 FK_{405}	—	September 29, 2003	Kitt Peak	Spacewatch	·	780 m	MPC · JPL
521142	2015 FX_{405}	—	October 9, 2012	Mount Lemmon	Mount Lemmon Survey	·	2.3 km	MPC · JPL
521143	2015 FA_{406}	—	May 24, 2011	Haleakala	Pan-STARRS 1	·	2.1 km	MPC · JPL
521144	2015 FC_{406}	—	October 1, 2005	Mount Lemmon	Mount Lemmon Survey	T_{j} (2.99) · EUP	2.8 km	MPC · JPL
521145	2015 FD_{406}	—	March 12, 2008	Kitt Peak	Spacewatch	·	630 m	MPC · JPL
521146	2015 FE_{406}	—	August 29, 2006	Kitt Peak	Spacewatch	EOS	1.9 km	MPC · JPL
521147	2015 FH_{406}	—	April 13, 2011	Kitt Peak	Spacewatch	·	1.4 km	MPC · JPL
521148	2015 FJ_{406}	—	February 18, 2010	Mount Lemmon	Mount Lemmon Survey	AGN	1.0 km	MPC · JPL
521149	2015 FM_{406}	—	March 17, 2015	Haleakala	Pan-STARRS 1	EOS	1.4 km	MPC · JPL
521150	2015 FO_{406}	—	November 29, 2013	Kitt Peak	Spacewatch	·	920 m	MPC · JPL
521151	2015 FR_{406}	—	November 12, 2012	Mount Lemmon	Mount Lemmon Survey	EOS	1.8 km	MPC · JPL
521152	2015 FG_{407}	—	August 30, 2006	Anderson Mesa	LONEOS	·	3.1 km	MPC · JPL
521153	2015 FJ_{407}	—	January 4, 2010	Kitt Peak	Spacewatch	·	3.0 km	MPC · JPL
521154	2015 FK_{407}	—	February 18, 2010	Kitt Peak	Spacewatch	HOF	2.1 km	MPC · JPL
521155	2015 FO_{407}	—	May 13, 2005	Kitt Peak	Spacewatch	EOS	1.6 km	MPC · JPL
521156	2015 FP_{407}	—	October 8, 2008	Kitt Peak	Spacewatch	·	1.7 km	MPC · JPL
521157	2015 FU_{407}	—	August 28, 2006	Kitt Peak	Spacewatch	·	1.8 km	MPC · JPL
521158	2015 FV_{407}	—	December 30, 2013	Mount Lemmon	Mount Lemmon Survey	HYG	2.9 km	MPC · JPL
521159	2015 FY_{407}	—	November 14, 2012	Mount Lemmon	Mount Lemmon Survey	EOS	1.7 km	MPC · JPL
521160	2015 FA_{408}	—	February 24, 2009	Kitt Peak	Spacewatch	·	2.7 km	MPC · JPL
521161	2015 FB_{408}	—	August 27, 2011	Haleakala	Pan-STARRS 1	·	2.5 km	MPC · JPL
521162	2015 FC_{408}	—	October 13, 2007	Mount Lemmon	Mount Lemmon Survey	·	2.2 km	MPC · JPL
521163	2015 FH_{408}	—	October 12, 2005	Kitt Peak	Spacewatch	·	1.1 km	MPC · JPL
521164	2015 FK_{408}	—	October 23, 2008	Kitt Peak	Spacewatch	MAR	930 m	MPC · JPL
521165	2015 FM_{408}	—	March 21, 2015	Haleakala	Pan-STARRS 1	·	1.8 km	MPC · JPL
521166	2015 FO_{408}	—	November 3, 2007	Kitt Peak	Spacewatch	·	3.2 km	MPC · JPL
521167	2015 FS_{408}	—	March 21, 2015	Haleakala	Pan-STARRS 1	·	2.2 km	MPC · JPL
521168	2015 FV_{408}	—	October 18, 2012	Haleakala	Pan-STARRS 1	·	1.1 km	MPC · JPL
521169	2015 FX_{408}	—	November 30, 2008	Kitt Peak	Spacewatch	·	1.7 km	MPC · JPL
521170	2015 FZ_{408}	—	January 3, 2009	Mount Lemmon	Mount Lemmon Survey	ANF	1.6 km	MPC · JPL
521171	2015 FH_{409}	—	September 17, 2013	Mount Lemmon	Mount Lemmon Survey	V	560 m	MPC · JPL
521172	2015 FM_{409}	—	March 22, 2015	Haleakala	Pan-STARRS 1	·	1.2 km	MPC · JPL
521173	2015 FY_{409}	—	March 22, 2015	Haleakala	Pan-STARRS 1	EUN	1.4 km	MPC · JPL
521174	2015 FB_{410}	—	December 7, 2013	Haleakala	Pan-STARRS 1	·	1.5 km	MPC · JPL
521175	2015 FF_{410}	—	March 22, 2015	Haleakala	Pan-STARRS 1	·	1.0 km	MPC · JPL
521176	2015 FG_{410}	—	February 2, 2009	Kitt Peak	Spacewatch	·	1.9 km	MPC · JPL
521177	2015 FL_{410}	—	January 31, 2006	Mount Lemmon	Mount Lemmon Survey	·	1.1 km	MPC · JPL
521178	2015 FV_{410}	—	January 19, 2015	Haleakala	Pan-STARRS 1	MAR	970 m	MPC · JPL
521179	2015 FW_{410}	—	September 17, 2012	Kitt Peak	Spacewatch	EOS	2.0 km	MPC · JPL
521180	2015 FZ_{410}	—	November 21, 2006	Mount Lemmon	Mount Lemmon Survey	·	1.3 km	MPC · JPL
521181	2015 FF_{411}	—	October 20, 2012	Haleakala	Pan-STARRS 1	·	1.8 km	MPC · JPL
521182	2015 FL_{411}	—	September 25, 2011	Haleakala	Pan-STARRS 1	·	2.8 km	MPC · JPL
521183	2015 FP_{411}	—	December 18, 2009	Kitt Peak	Spacewatch	·	1.6 km	MPC · JPL
521184	2015 FQ_{411}	—	March 28, 2015	Haleakala	Pan-STARRS 1	·	1.4 km	MPC · JPL
521185	2015 FR_{411}	—	January 31, 2009	Kitt Peak	Spacewatch	EOS	1.8 km	MPC · JPL
521186	2015 FT_{411}	—	November 29, 2013	Haleakala	Pan-STARRS 1	KON	2.1 km	MPC · JPL
521187	2015 FU_{411}	—	January 9, 2014	Mount Lemmon	Mount Lemmon Survey	·	2.7 km	MPC · JPL
521188	2015 FX_{411}	—	March 28, 2015	Haleakala	Pan-STARRS 1	·	1.9 km	MPC · JPL
521189	2015 FY_{411}	—	December 4, 2007	Kitt Peak	Spacewatch	·	3.4 km	MPC · JPL
521190	2015 FL_{412}	—	January 23, 2014	Mount Lemmon	Mount Lemmon Survey	·	2.6 km	MPC · JPL
521191	2015 FM_{412}	—	January 9, 2014	Mount Lemmon	Mount Lemmon Survey	·	1.7 km	MPC · JPL
521192	2015 FN_{412}	—	September 26, 2006	Kitt Peak	Spacewatch	·	3.0 km	MPC · JPL
521193	2015 FP_{412}	—	December 31, 2013	Haleakala	Pan-STARRS 1	·	1.8 km	MPC · JPL
521194	2015 FS_{412}	—	November 9, 2013	Catalina	CSS	·	1.8 km	MPC · JPL
521195	2015 FY_{412}	—	October 9, 2012	Haleakala	Pan-STARRS 1	·	1.6 km	MPC · JPL
521196	2015 FA_{413}	—	September 24, 2007	Kitt Peak	Spacewatch	EUP	3.3 km	MPC · JPL
521197	2015 FB_{413}	—	April 14, 2008	Mount Lemmon	Mount Lemmon Survey	·	880 m	MPC · JPL
521198	2015 FG_{413}	—	November 28, 2013	Mount Lemmon	Mount Lemmon Survey	·	950 m	MPC · JPL
521199	2015 FH_{413}	—	December 31, 2008	Kitt Peak	Spacewatch	·	3.0 km	MPC · JPL
521200	2015 FJ_{413}	—	February 28, 2014	Haleakala	Pan-STARRS 1	URS	2.3 km	MPC · JPL

== 521201–521300 ==
back to top

Designation			Discovery			Properties		Ref
Permanent	Provisional	Named after	Date	Site	Discoverer(s)	Category	Diam.	Ref
521201	2015 FM_{413}	—	October 26, 2011	Haleakala	Pan-STARRS 1	·	3.4 km	MPC · JPL
521202	2015 FN_{413}	—	March 29, 2015	Haleakala	Pan-STARRS 1	·	1.3 km	MPC · JPL
521203	2015 FW_{413}	—	March 15, 2007	Mount Lemmon	Mount Lemmon Survey	·	1.4 km	MPC · JPL
521204	2015 FX_{413}	—	March 30, 2015	Haleakala	Pan-STARRS 1	·	2.5 km	MPC · JPL
521205	2015 FZ_{413}	—	March 17, 2009	Kitt Peak	Spacewatch	·	1.9 km	MPC · JPL
521206	2015 FA_{414}	—	March 18, 2010	Kitt Peak	Spacewatch	·	1.8 km	MPC · JPL
521207	2015 FC_{414}	—	April 21, 2006	Kitt Peak	Spacewatch	·	1.4 km	MPC · JPL
521208	2015 FE_{414}	—	September 17, 2006	Kitt Peak	Spacewatch	EOS	1.4 km	MPC · JPL
521209	2015 FF_{414}	—	March 30, 2015	Haleakala	Pan-STARRS 1	EOS	1.4 km	MPC · JPL
521210	2015 FG_{414}	—	October 18, 2007	Kitt Peak	Spacewatch	·	1.9 km	MPC · JPL
521211	2015 FH_{414}	—	March 2, 2009	Kitt Peak	Spacewatch	EOS	1.7 km	MPC · JPL
521212	2015 FJ_{414}	—	March 30, 2015	Haleakala	Pan-STARRS 1	·	2.2 km	MPC · JPL
521213	2015 FL_{414}	—	September 27, 2006	Catalina	CSS	·	2.8 km	MPC · JPL
521214	2015 GC	—	February 11, 2011	Catalina	CSS	·	1.8 km	MPC · JPL
521215	2015 GS_{31}	—	January 27, 2007	Kitt Peak	Spacewatch	·	940 m	MPC · JPL
521216	2015 GL_{52}	—	November 6, 2013	Haleakala	Pan-STARRS 1	·	1.2 km	MPC · JPL
521217	2015 GO_{52}	—	March 4, 2006	Kitt Peak	Spacewatch	·	1.4 km	MPC · JPL
521218	2015 GQ_{52}	—	October 18, 2012	Haleakala	Pan-STARRS 1	·	1.6 km	MPC · JPL
521219	2015 GV_{52}	—	March 9, 2011	Mount Lemmon	Mount Lemmon Survey	·	970 m	MPC · JPL
521220	2015 GW_{52}	—	September 25, 2011	Haleakala	Pan-STARRS 1	URS	2.8 km	MPC · JPL
521221	2015 GX_{52}	—	April 10, 2015	Mount Lemmon	Mount Lemmon Survey	·	3.2 km	MPC · JPL
521222	2015 GA_{53}	—	January 25, 2014	Haleakala	Pan-STARRS 1	·	1.7 km	MPC · JPL
521223	2015 GC_{53}	—	February 10, 2014	Mount Lemmon	Mount Lemmon Survey	·	2.0 km	MPC · JPL
521224	2015 GH_{53}	—	April 13, 2015	Haleakala	Pan-STARRS 1	EOS	1.5 km	MPC · JPL
521225	2015 GJ_{53}	—	April 13, 2015	Haleakala	Pan-STARRS 1	·	1.8 km	MPC · JPL
521226	2015 GK_{53}	—	November 11, 2007	Mount Lemmon	Mount Lemmon Survey	·	2.7 km	MPC · JPL
521227	2015 GL_{53}	—	April 13, 2015	Haleakala	Pan-STARRS 1	EUN	940 m	MPC · JPL
521228	2015 GU_{53}	—	March 3, 2009	Mount Lemmon	Mount Lemmon Survey	·	2.3 km	MPC · JPL
521229	2015 HD_{19}	—	June 11, 2005	Kitt Peak	Spacewatch	·	2.1 km	MPC · JPL
521230	2015 HZ_{126}	—	September 28, 2009	Kitt Peak	Spacewatch	·	930 m	MPC · JPL
521231	2015 HT_{179}	—	March 17, 2015	Kitt Peak	Spacewatch	·	910 m	MPC · JPL
521232	2015 HX_{186}	—	December 18, 2007	Mount Lemmon	Mount Lemmon Survey	TEL	1.5 km	MPC · JPL
521233	2015 HO_{188}	—	April 18, 2015	Kitt Peak	Spacewatch	·	3.0 km	MPC · JPL
521234	2015 HX_{188}	—	August 30, 2011	Haleakala	Pan-STARRS 1	EOS	2.0 km	MPC · JPL
521235	2015 HG_{189}	—	November 17, 2007	Kitt Peak	Spacewatch	EOS	1.6 km	MPC · JPL
521236	2015 HK_{189}	—	January 25, 2014	Haleakala	Pan-STARRS 1	·	1.4 km	MPC · JPL
521237	2015 HL_{189}	—	November 30, 2006	Kitt Peak	Spacewatch	·	930 m	MPC · JPL
521238	2015 HN_{189}	—	October 9, 2012	Haleakala	Pan-STARRS 1	·	1 km	MPC · JPL
521239	2015 HO_{189}	—	September 28, 2006	Kitt Peak	Spacewatch	EOS	2.0 km	MPC · JPL
521240	2015 HS_{189}	—	April 18, 2015	Haleakala	Pan-STARRS 1	·	1.4 km	MPC · JPL
521241	2015 HT_{189}	—	April 2, 2009	Mount Lemmon	Mount Lemmon Survey	·	2.2 km	MPC · JPL
521242	2015 HX_{189}	—	April 23, 2011	Kitt Peak	Spacewatch	MAR	780 m	MPC · JPL
521243	2015 HY_{189}	—	February 25, 2011	Mount Lemmon	Mount Lemmon Survey	MAS	600 m	MPC · JPL
521244	2015 HA_{190}	—	October 21, 2012	Haleakala	Pan-STARRS 1	·	1.9 km	MPC · JPL
521245	2015 HO_{190}	—	September 24, 2011	Mount Lemmon	Mount Lemmon Survey	·	2.2 km	MPC · JPL
521246	2015 HU_{190}	—	March 6, 2011	Mount Lemmon	Mount Lemmon Survey	·	930 m	MPC · JPL
521247	2015 HX_{190}	—	December 19, 2004	Mount Lemmon	Mount Lemmon Survey	NEM	2.4 km	MPC · JPL
521248	2015 HY_{190}	—	June 4, 2011	Mount Lemmon	Mount Lemmon Survey	EUN	1.0 km	MPC · JPL
521249	2015 HZ_{190}	—	November 18, 2008	Kitt Peak	Spacewatch	AGN	1 km	MPC · JPL
521250	2015 HA_{191}	—	June 8, 2011	Mount Lemmon	Mount Lemmon Survey	·	1.9 km	MPC · JPL
521251	2015 HH_{191}	—	October 11, 2012	Kitt Peak	Spacewatch	·	1.5 km	MPC · JPL
521252	2015 HJ_{191}	—	October 22, 2012	Haleakala	Pan-STARRS 1	EOS	2.0 km	MPC · JPL
521253	2015 HO_{191}	—	March 30, 2015	Haleakala	Pan-STARRS 1	·	2.3 km	MPC · JPL
521254	2015 HP_{191}	—	September 17, 2012	Kitt Peak	Spacewatch	·	2.0 km	MPC · JPL
521255	2015 HQ_{191}	—	September 4, 2011	Haleakala	Pan-STARRS 1	·	2.4 km	MPC · JPL
521256	2015 HS_{191}	—	March 24, 2015	Mount Lemmon	Mount Lemmon Survey	·	1.1 km	MPC · JPL
521257	2015 HC_{192}	—	April 23, 2015	Haleakala	Pan-STARRS 1	EOS	1.3 km	MPC · JPL
521258	2015 HJ_{192}	—	October 12, 2007	Mount Lemmon	Mount Lemmon Survey	·	1.7 km	MPC · JPL
521259	2015 HK_{192}	—	October 1, 2005	Catalina	CSS	·	3.3 km	MPC · JPL
521260	2015 HL_{192}	—	October 20, 2011	Mount Lemmon	Mount Lemmon Survey	·	2.1 km	MPC · JPL
521261	2015 HN_{192}	—	December 3, 2012	Mount Lemmon	Mount Lemmon Survey	·	1.7 km	MPC · JPL
521262	2015 HP_{192}	—	October 28, 2005	Mount Lemmon	Mount Lemmon Survey	CYB	3.0 km	MPC · JPL
521263	2015 HQ_{192}	—	April 23, 2015	Kitt Peak	Spacewatch	EOS	1.8 km	MPC · JPL
521264	2015 HS_{192}	—	November 7, 2012	Kitt Peak	Spacewatch	·	2.5 km	MPC · JPL
521265	2015 HV_{192}	—	August 24, 2007	Kitt Peak	Spacewatch	HOF	2.1 km	MPC · JPL
521266	2015 HY_{192}	—	September 28, 2008	Mount Lemmon	Mount Lemmon Survey	·	1.6 km	MPC · JPL
521267	2015 HH_{193}	—	December 26, 2006	Kitt Peak	Spacewatch	V	550 m	MPC · JPL
521268	2015 HN_{193}	—	May 20, 2006	Kitt Peak	Spacewatch	·	2.0 km	MPC · JPL
521269	2015 HT_{193}	—	November 27, 2012	Mount Lemmon	Mount Lemmon Survey	EOS	1.8 km	MPC · JPL
521270	2015 HV_{193}	—	April 25, 2015	Haleakala	Pan-STARRS 1	·	1.9 km	MPC · JPL
521271	2015 HY_{193}	—	October 8, 2012	Haleakala	Pan-STARRS 1	·	1.7 km	MPC · JPL
521272	2015 HD_{194}	—	April 25, 2015	Haleakala	Pan-STARRS 1	HOF	2.3 km	MPC · JPL
521273	2015 HG_{194}	—	September 25, 2011	Haleakala	Pan-STARRS 1	·	2.5 km	MPC · JPL
521274	2015 HH_{194}	—	September 24, 2011	Mount Lemmon	Mount Lemmon Survey	·	2.8 km	MPC · JPL
521275	2015 HK_{194}	—	February 8, 2008	Mount Lemmon	Mount Lemmon Survey	·	2.6 km	MPC · JPL
521276	2015 HO_{194}	—	March 16, 2010	Kitt Peak	Spacewatch	·	1.1 km	MPC · JPL
521277	2015 HQ_{194}	—	October 26, 2011	Haleakala	Pan-STARRS 1	·	2.6 km	MPC · JPL
521278	2015 HT_{194}	—	September 20, 2011	Mount Lemmon	Mount Lemmon Survey	BRA	1.2 km	MPC · JPL
521279	2015 HV_{194}	—	September 25, 2012	Mount Lemmon	Mount Lemmon Survey	·	1.9 km	MPC · JPL
521280	2015 HW_{194}	—	March 16, 2009	Kitt Peak	Spacewatch	·	2.2 km	MPC · JPL
521281	2015 JN_{14}	—	February 3, 2009	Kitt Peak	Spacewatch	·	1.3 km	MPC · JPL
521282	2015 JO_{14}	—	October 21, 2007	Mount Lemmon	Mount Lemmon Survey	·	2.4 km	MPC · JPL
521283	2015 JS_{14}	—	January 1, 2014	Kitt Peak	Spacewatch	·	1.9 km	MPC · JPL
521284	2015 JU_{14}	—	November 5, 2007	Kitt Peak	Spacewatch	·	2.2 km	MPC · JPL
521285	2015 JV_{14}	—	September 15, 2007	Mount Lemmon	Mount Lemmon Survey	·	1.9 km	MPC · JPL
521286	2015 JX_{14}	—	February 13, 2011	Mount Lemmon	Mount Lemmon Survey	·	680 m	MPC · JPL
521287	2015 JZ_{14}	—	May 13, 2011	Mount Lemmon	Mount Lemmon Survey	·	1.2 km	MPC · JPL
521288	2015 JH_{15}	—	May 13, 2015	Haleakala	Pan-STARRS 1	·	2.7 km	MPC · JPL
521289	2015 JO_{15}	—	February 28, 2014	Haleakala	Pan-STARRS 1	·	2.4 km	MPC · JPL
521290	2015 JP_{15}	—	January 11, 2008	Kitt Peak	Spacewatch	·	2.9 km	MPC · JPL
521291	2015 JR_{15}	—	January 23, 2014	Mount Lemmon	Mount Lemmon Survey	·	2.9 km	MPC · JPL
521292	2015 JT_{15}	—	March 24, 2009	Kitt Peak	Spacewatch	TIR	2.8 km	MPC · JPL
521293	2015 JY_{15}	—	August 13, 2012	Kitt Peak	Spacewatch	·	890 m	MPC · JPL
521294	2015 JB_{16}	—	May 15, 2015	Haleakala	Pan-STARRS 1	·	2.4 km	MPC · JPL
521295	2015 JC_{16}	—	December 7, 2008	Mount Lemmon	Mount Lemmon Survey	615	1.3 km	MPC · JPL
521296	2015 JD_{16}	—	May 15, 2015	Haleakala	Pan-STARRS 1	·	1.6 km	MPC · JPL
521297	2015 KN_{112}	—	February 10, 2014	Haleakala	Pan-STARRS 1	·	1.7 km	MPC · JPL
521298	2015 KX_{122}	—	January 31, 2006	Catalina	CSS	·	1.5 km	MPC · JPL
521299	2015 KS_{148}	—	April 8, 2008	Kitt Peak	Spacewatch	·	830 m	MPC · JPL
521300	2015 KP_{168}	—	May 18, 2015	Mount Lemmon	Mount Lemmon Survey	·	2.4 km	MPC · JPL

== 521301–521400 ==
back to top

Designation			Discovery			Properties		Ref
Permanent	Provisional	Named after	Date	Site	Discoverer(s)	Category	Diam.	Ref
521301	2015 KA_{169}	—	April 7, 2003	Kitt Peak	Spacewatch	·	2.5 km	MPC · JPL
521302	2015 KC_{169}	—	March 30, 2014	Catalina	CSS	·	2.5 km	MPC · JPL
521303	2015 KD_{169}	—	March 30, 2003	Anderson Mesa	LONEOS	·	3.3 km	MPC · JPL
521304	2015 KJ_{169}	—	March 24, 2009	Mount Lemmon	Mount Lemmon Survey	·	2.7 km	MPC · JPL
521305	2015 KM_{169}	—	October 25, 2011	Haleakala	Pan-STARRS 1	·	3.2 km	MPC · JPL
521306	2015 KP_{169}	—	March 10, 2007	Kitt Peak	Spacewatch	NYS	940 m	MPC · JPL
521307	2015 KQ_{169}	—	September 7, 2011	Kitt Peak	Spacewatch	(31811)	2.6 km	MPC · JPL
521308	2015 KV_{169}	—	February 24, 2014	Haleakala	Pan-STARRS 1	·	2.3 km	MPC · JPL
521309	2015 KX_{169}	—	February 25, 2006	Kitt Peak	Spacewatch	·	1.2 km	MPC · JPL
521310	2015 KY_{169}	—	April 30, 2006	Kitt Peak	Spacewatch	·	1.2 km	MPC · JPL
521311	2015 KA_{170}	—	October 25, 2009	Kitt Peak	Spacewatch	·	760 m	MPC · JPL
521312	2015 KE_{170}	—	December 4, 2007	Mount Lemmon	Mount Lemmon Survey	·	1.6 km	MPC · JPL
521313	2015 KJ_{170}	—	March 19, 2010	Mount Lemmon	Mount Lemmon Survey	AGN	1.0 km	MPC · JPL
521314	2015 KK_{170}	—	October 7, 2012	Haleakala	Pan-STARRS 1	·	1.2 km	MPC · JPL
521315	2015 KP_{170}	—	September 16, 2012	Kitt Peak	Spacewatch	·	1.4 km	MPC · JPL
521316	2015 KY_{170}	—	November 7, 2012	Mount Lemmon	Mount Lemmon Survey	·	1.3 km	MPC · JPL
521317	2015 KB_{171}	—	March 31, 2008	Mount Lemmon	Mount Lemmon Survey	·	690 m	MPC · JPL
521318	2015 KC_{171}	—	September 24, 2011	Haleakala	Pan-STARRS 1	·	2.4 km	MPC · JPL
521319	2015 KE_{171}	—	October 27, 2011	Mount Lemmon	Mount Lemmon Survey	·	3.4 km	MPC · JPL
521320	2015 KL_{171}	—	December 9, 2012	Haleakala	Pan-STARRS 1	·	1.9 km	MPC · JPL
521321	2015 KM_{171}	—	February 26, 2014	Mount Lemmon	Mount Lemmon Survey	·	2.9 km	MPC · JPL
521322	2015 KQ_{171}	—	May 25, 2015	Haleakala	Pan-STARRS 1	·	1.3 km	MPC · JPL
521323	2015 KS_{171}	—	June 22, 2011	Kitt Peak	Spacewatch	MAR	920 m	MPC · JPL
521324	2015 KZ_{171}	—	August 10, 2012	Kitt Peak	Spacewatch	·	1.1 km	MPC · JPL
521325	2015 KA_{172}	—	May 26, 2015	Haleakala	Pan-STARRS 1	·	1.9 km	MPC · JPL
521326	2015 KB_{172}	—	September 4, 2011	Haleakala	Pan-STARRS 1	EOS	1.6 km	MPC · JPL
521327	2015 KD_{172}	—	October 18, 2011	Haleakala	Pan-STARRS 1	·	2.0 km	MPC · JPL
521328	2015 LK_{33}	—	May 14, 2008	Mount Lemmon	Mount Lemmon Survey	·	610 m	MPC · JPL
521329	2015 LH_{43}	—	October 24, 2011	Haleakala	Pan-STARRS 1	·	2.0 km	MPC · JPL
521330	2015 LR_{43}	—	June 21, 2010	Mount Lemmon	Mount Lemmon Survey	·	2.3 km	MPC · JPL
521331	2015 LU_{43}	—	September 20, 2007	Kitt Peak	Spacewatch	·	1.5 km	MPC · JPL
521332	2015 LV_{43}	—	February 10, 2008	Kitt Peak	Spacewatch	·	2.8 km	MPC · JPL
521333	2015 LY_{43}	—	March 30, 2009	Mount Lemmon	Mount Lemmon Survey	·	2.7 km	MPC · JPL
521334	2015 LZ_{43}	—	February 16, 2004	Kitt Peak	Spacewatch	·	730 m	MPC · JPL
521335	2015 LH_{44}	—	April 20, 2007	Kitt Peak	Spacewatch	·	1.1 km	MPC · JPL
521336	2015 LJ_{44}	—	December 31, 2013	Haleakala	Pan-STARRS 1	·	1.8 km	MPC · JPL
521337	2015 LK_{44}	—	January 25, 2014	Haleakala	Pan-STARRS 1	·	2.2 km	MPC · JPL
521338	2015 LO_{44}	—	May 7, 2014	Haleakala	Pan-STARRS 1	·	1.9 km	MPC · JPL
521339	2015 LQ_{44}	—	February 15, 2013	Haleakala	Pan-STARRS 1	·	3.0 km	MPC · JPL
521340	2015 LU_{44}	—	April 22, 2009	Sandlot	G. Hug	·	2.5 km	MPC · JPL
521341	2015 LW_{44}	—	June 13, 2015	Haleakala	Pan-STARRS 1	·	1.6 km	MPC · JPL
521342	2015 LX_{44}	—	March 13, 2007	Kitt Peak	Spacewatch	·	1.1 km	MPC · JPL
521343	2015 LC_{45}	—	October 21, 2006	Mount Lemmon	Mount Lemmon Survey	·	2.3 km	MPC · JPL
521344	2015 LD_{45}	—	July 1, 2011	Mount Lemmon	Mount Lemmon Survey	·	950 m	MPC · JPL
521345	2015 LF_{45}	—	November 25, 2005	Catalina	CSS	TIR	2.7 km	MPC · JPL
521346	2015 LH_{45}	—	July 26, 2011	Haleakala	Pan-STARRS 1	(194)	1.4 km	MPC · JPL
521347	2015 LJ_{45}	—	September 14, 2007	Mount Lemmon	Mount Lemmon Survey	·	1.3 km	MPC · JPL
521348	2015 LK_{45}	—	February 25, 2014	Kitt Peak	Spacewatch	EOS	1.6 km	MPC · JPL
521349	2015 LM_{45}	—	February 27, 2014	Kitt Peak	Spacewatch	·	1.4 km	MPC · JPL
521350	2015 LR_{45}	—	February 9, 2010	Kitt Peak	Spacewatch	·	1.3 km	MPC · JPL
521351	2015 LV_{45}	—	February 28, 2014	Haleakala	Pan-STARRS 1	·	1.2 km	MPC · JPL
521352	2015 LF_{46}	—	June 15, 2015	Haleakala	Pan-STARRS 1	MAR	1.0 km	MPC · JPL
521353	2015 LG_{46}	—	February 13, 2013	Haleakala	Pan-STARRS 1	EOS	1.6 km	MPC · JPL
521354	2015 LH_{46}	—	October 29, 2006	Kitt Peak	Spacewatch	·	1.5 km	MPC · JPL
521355	2015 MU_{34}	—	December 4, 2012	Mount Lemmon	Mount Lemmon Survey	EOS	1.7 km	MPC · JPL
521356	2015 ML_{56}	—	January 5, 2014	Haleakala	Pan-STARRS 1	·	1.3 km	MPC · JPL
521357	2015 MB_{86}	—	April 14, 2008	Kitt Peak	Spacewatch	·	600 m	MPC · JPL
521358	2015 MS_{86}	—	November 22, 2006	Kitt Peak	Spacewatch	·	440 m	MPC · JPL
521359	2015 MH_{95}	—	August 25, 2000	Socorro	LINEAR	·	1.9 km	MPC · JPL
521360	2015 MB_{121}	—	October 22, 2012	Mount Lemmon	Mount Lemmon Survey	·	920 m	MPC · JPL
521361	2015 MN_{137}	—	June 25, 2015	Haleakala	Pan-STARRS 1	V	530 m	MPC · JPL
521362	2015 MH_{139}	—	November 17, 2011	Kitt Peak	Spacewatch	·	3.1 km	MPC · JPL
521363	2015 MJ_{139}	—	March 29, 2014	Kitt Peak	Spacewatch	·	1.6 km	MPC · JPL
521364	2015 MK_{139}	—	February 27, 2009	Kitt Peak	Spacewatch	HOF	2.2 km	MPC · JPL
521365	2015 MP_{139}	—	June 17, 2015	Haleakala	Pan-STARRS 1	·	2.2 km	MPC · JPL
521366	2015 MW_{139}	—	June 17, 2015	Haleakala	Pan-STARRS 1	·	2.7 km	MPC · JPL
521367	2015 MX_{139}	—	October 26, 2011	Haleakala	Pan-STARRS 1	EOS	1.9 km	MPC · JPL
521368	2015 MZ_{139}	—	February 14, 2013	Haleakala	Pan-STARRS 1	·	2.4 km	MPC · JPL
521369	2015 MF_{140}	—	May 3, 2011	Mount Lemmon	Mount Lemmon Survey	·	620 m	MPC · JPL
521370	2015 MN_{140}	—	April 4, 2008	Kitt Peak	Spacewatch	·	3.0 km	MPC · JPL
521371	2015 MU_{140}	—	September 23, 2011	Haleakala	Pan-STARRS 1	AGN	1.0 km	MPC · JPL
521372	2015 MV_{140}	—	February 28, 2014	Haleakala	Pan-STARRS 1	·	1.7 km	MPC · JPL
521373	2015 MD_{141}	—	September 21, 2012	Mount Lemmon	Mount Lemmon Survey	·	650 m	MPC · JPL
521374	2015 ME_{141}	—	August 19, 2006	Kitt Peak	Spacewatch	AGN	1.0 km	MPC · JPL
521375	2015 MF_{141}	—	April 1, 2008	Kitt Peak	Spacewatch	·	2.5 km	MPC · JPL
521376	2015 MJ_{141}	—	November 10, 2004	Kitt Peak	Spacewatch	·	1.0 km	MPC · JPL
521377	2015 MK_{141}	—	January 7, 2013	Kitt Peak	Spacewatch	·	2.7 km	MPC · JPL
521378	2015 ML_{141}	—	January 27, 2012	Mount Lemmon	Mount Lemmon Survey	·	2.3 km	MPC · JPL
521379	2015 MQ_{141}	—	June 18, 2015	Haleakala	Pan-STARRS 1	·	2.8 km	MPC · JPL
521380	2015 MS_{141}	—	June 18, 2015	Haleakala	Pan-STARRS 1	·	990 m	MPC · JPL
521381	2015 MT_{141}	—	January 20, 2013	Mount Lemmon	Mount Lemmon Survey	·	2.7 km	MPC · JPL
521382	2015 MA_{142}	—	November 5, 2007	Kitt Peak	Spacewatch	·	1.8 km	MPC · JPL
521383	2015 MB_{142}	—	January 3, 2013	Mount Lemmon	Mount Lemmon Survey	·	2.7 km	MPC · JPL
521384	2015 ME_{142}	—	November 8, 2007	Kitt Peak	Spacewatch	·	1.7 km	MPC · JPL
521385	2015 MH_{142}	—	April 14, 2007	Mount Lemmon	Mount Lemmon Survey	MAS	580 m	MPC · JPL
521386	2015 MT_{142}	—	October 1, 2005	Kitt Peak	Spacewatch	·	2.2 km	MPC · JPL
521387	2015 MV_{142}	—	February 22, 2009	Kitt Peak	Spacewatch	AGN	1.2 km	MPC · JPL
521388	2015 MX_{142}	—	September 18, 2010	Mount Lemmon	Mount Lemmon Survey	·	2.6 km	MPC · JPL
521389	2015 MY_{142}	—	June 20, 2015	Haleakala	Pan-STARRS 1	·	1.4 km	MPC · JPL
521390	2015 MZ_{142}	—	October 8, 2008	Kitt Peak	Spacewatch	·	1.1 km	MPC · JPL
521391	2015 MB_{143}	—	September 4, 2011	Haleakala	Pan-STARRS 1	·	1.4 km	MPC · JPL
521392	2015 MD_{143}	—	December 25, 2006	Kitt Peak	Spacewatch	·	2.2 km	MPC · JPL
521393	2015 MG_{143}	—	June 12, 2004	Kitt Peak	Spacewatch	EOS	1.7 km	MPC · JPL
521394	2015 MK_{143}	—	January 17, 2013	Haleakala	Pan-STARRS 1	AGN	950 m	MPC · JPL
521395	2015 MN_{143}	—	September 16, 2010	Mount Lemmon	Mount Lemmon Survey	·	2.8 km	MPC · JPL
521396	2015 MS_{143}	—	September 10, 2007	Mount Lemmon	Mount Lemmon Survey	·	1.1 km	MPC · JPL
521397	2015 MT_{143}	—	June 22, 2015	Haleakala	Pan-STARRS 1	·	3.7 km	MPC · JPL
521398	2015 MU_{143}	—	November 22, 2008	Kitt Peak	Spacewatch	·	1.6 km	MPC · JPL
521399	2015 MV_{143}	—	November 23, 2006	Mount Lemmon	Mount Lemmon Survey	615	1.8 km	MPC · JPL
521400	2015 MW_{143}	—	March 11, 2005	Mount Lemmon	Mount Lemmon Survey	·	1.8 km	MPC · JPL

== 521401–521500 ==
back to top

Designation			Discovery			Properties		Ref
Permanent	Provisional	Named after	Date	Site	Discoverer(s)	Category	Diam.	Ref
521401	2015 MZ_{143}	—	August 27, 2006	Kitt Peak	Spacewatch	HOF	2.2 km	MPC · JPL
521402	2015 MC_{144}	—	February 9, 2008	Kitt Peak	Spacewatch	·	3.0 km	MPC · JPL
521403	2015 MF_{144}	—	January 18, 2013	Haleakala	Pan-STARRS 1	·	3.1 km	MPC · JPL
521404	2015 ML_{144}	—	March 29, 2008	Mount Lemmon	Mount Lemmon Survey	LUT	4.1 km	MPC · JPL
521405	2015 MN_{144}	—	October 30, 2005	Mount Lemmon	Mount Lemmon Survey	·	3.0 km	MPC · JPL
521406	2015 MO_{144}	—	December 13, 2006	Mount Lemmon	Mount Lemmon Survey	·	1.8 km	MPC · JPL
521407	2015 MQ_{144}	—	January 19, 2012	Kitt Peak	Spacewatch	·	4.0 km	MPC · JPL
521408	2015 MR_{144}	—	November 14, 2010	Kitt Peak	Spacewatch	·	2.9 km	MPC · JPL
521409	2015 MW_{144}	—	January 18, 2013	Haleakala	Pan-STARRS 1	HNS	1.3 km	MPC · JPL
521410	2015 MC_{145}	—	January 30, 2008	Mount Lemmon	Mount Lemmon Survey	·	2.0 km	MPC · JPL
521411	2015 MJ_{145}	—	April 4, 2014	Haleakala	Pan-STARRS 1	·	1.5 km	MPC · JPL
521412	2015 MM_{145}	—	October 9, 2007	Mount Lemmon	Mount Lemmon Survey	·	1.6 km	MPC · JPL
521413	2015 MT_{145}	—	April 30, 2014	Haleakala	Pan-STARRS 1	·	2.0 km	MPC · JPL
521414	2015 MG_{146}	—	September 30, 2006	Kitt Peak	Spacewatch	·	1.8 km	MPC · JPL
521415	2015 MO_{146}	—	August 19, 2006	Kitt Peak	Spacewatch	HOF	1.8 km	MPC · JPL
521416	2015 MR_{146}	—	September 28, 2006	Kitt Peak	Spacewatch	·	1.8 km	MPC · JPL
521417	2015 MX_{146}	—	January 19, 2012	Haleakala	Pan-STARRS 1	·	2.2 km	MPC · JPL
521418	2015 MB_{147}	—	November 10, 2010	Mount Lemmon	Mount Lemmon Survey	·	2.3 km	MPC · JPL
521419	2015 MG_{147}	—	September 29, 2011	Kitt Peak	Spacewatch	·	1.5 km	MPC · JPL
521420	2015 ML_{147}	—	September 17, 2010	Mount Lemmon	Mount Lemmon Survey	·	2.7 km	MPC · JPL
521421	2015 MM_{147}	—	May 13, 2009	Kitt Peak	Spacewatch	EOS	1.7 km	MPC · JPL
521422	2015 MN_{147}	—	October 31, 2011	Mount Lemmon	Mount Lemmon Survey	·	1.8 km	MPC · JPL
521423	2015 MZ_{147}	—	August 10, 2007	Kitt Peak	Spacewatch	MAR	850 m	MPC · JPL
521424	2015 ME_{148}	—	November 17, 2011	Kitt Peak	Spacewatch	·	1.6 km	MPC · JPL
521425	2015 MM_{148}	—	November 24, 2006	Mount Lemmon	Mount Lemmon Survey	·	2.6 km	MPC · JPL
521426	2015 MP_{148}	—	March 13, 2005	Kitt Peak	Spacewatch	·	1.4 km	MPC · JPL
521427	2015 MW_{148}	—	August 29, 2006	Kitt Peak	Spacewatch	WIT	690 m	MPC · JPL
521428	2015 MN_{149}	—	April 5, 2008	Mount Lemmon	Mount Lemmon Survey	·	2.7 km	MPC · JPL
521429	2015 MO_{149}	—	June 29, 2015	Haleakala	Pan-STARRS 1	·	1.3 km	MPC · JPL
521430	2015 MQ_{149}	—	June 29, 2015	Haleakala	Pan-STARRS 1	EOS	1.7 km	MPC · JPL
521431	2015 MR_{149}	—	November 20, 2007	Mount Lemmon	Mount Lemmon Survey	·	2.3 km	MPC · JPL
521432	2015 MT_{149}	—	June 29, 2015	Haleakala	Pan-STARRS 1	·	2.9 km	MPC · JPL
521433	2015 NZ_{8}	—	November 12, 2012	Haleakala	Pan-STARRS 1	·	530 m	MPC · JPL
521434	2015 NR_{23}	—	February 1, 2008	Mount Lemmon	Mount Lemmon Survey	·	700 m	MPC · JPL
521435	2015 NF_{27}	—	February 4, 2009	Mount Lemmon	Mount Lemmon Survey	·	1.4 km	MPC · JPL
521436	2015 NK_{27}	—	January 26, 2014	Haleakala	Pan-STARRS 1	JUN	930 m	MPC · JPL
521437	2015 NN_{27}	—	July 12, 2015	Haleakala	Pan-STARRS 1	·	1.7 km	MPC · JPL
521438	2015 NA_{28}	—	September 18, 2010	Mount Lemmon	Mount Lemmon Survey	·	3.3 km	MPC · JPL
521439	2015 NB_{28}	—	July 12, 2015	Haleakala	Pan-STARRS 1	·	2.9 km	MPC · JPL
521440	2015 NE_{28}	—	July 14, 2015	Haleakala	Pan-STARRS 1	·	1.7 km	MPC · JPL
521441	2015 NG_{28}	—	October 4, 1996	Kitt Peak	Spacewatch	·	2.2 km	MPC · JPL
521442	2015 NH_{28}	—	November 2, 2007	Kitt Peak	Spacewatch	·	1.8 km	MPC · JPL
521443	2015 NJ_{28}	—	October 16, 2012	Kitt Peak	Spacewatch	·	880 m	MPC · JPL
521444	2015 NM_{28}	—	December 8, 2012	Kitt Peak	Spacewatch	·	1.0 km	MPC · JPL
521445	2015 NP_{28}	—	September 17, 2006	Kitt Peak	Spacewatch	·	1.6 km	MPC · JPL
521446	2015 OG_{11}	—	November 5, 2005	Mount Lemmon	Mount Lemmon Survey	V	490 m	MPC · JPL
521447	2015 OJ_{25}	—	October 10, 2005	Kitt Peak	Spacewatch	·	810 m	MPC · JPL
521448	2015 OT_{25}	—	August 23, 2007	Kitt Peak	Spacewatch	·	1.3 km	MPC · JPL
521449	2015 OM_{30}	—	August 24, 2008	Kitt Peak	Spacewatch	·	820 m	MPC · JPL
521450	2015 OX_{35}	—	January 19, 1999	Kitt Peak	Spacewatch	·	1.3 km	MPC · JPL
521451	2015 OX_{74}	—	March 9, 2007	Kitt Peak	Spacewatch	·	830 m	MPC · JPL
521452	2015 ON_{78}	—	January 6, 2013	Mount Lemmon	Mount Lemmon Survey	·	2.8 km	MPC · JPL
521453	2015 OU_{84}	—	January 7, 2010	Kitt Peak	Spacewatch	·	980 m	MPC · JPL
521454	2015 OJ_{86}	—	November 20, 2009	Kitt Peak	Spacewatch	·	850 m	MPC · JPL
521455	2015 OJ_{90}	—	February 2, 2014	Tenerife	ESA OGS	NYS	890 m	MPC · JPL
521456	2015 OY_{90}	—	October 29, 2003	Kitt Peak	Spacewatch	·	1.3 km	MPC · JPL
521457	2015 OG_{91}	—	November 26, 2012	Mount Lemmon	Mount Lemmon Survey	·	2.5 km	MPC · JPL
521458	2015 OJ_{91}	—	January 1, 2012	Mount Lemmon	Mount Lemmon Survey	·	2.7 km	MPC · JPL
521459	2015 OO_{91}	—	February 1, 2009	Kitt Peak	Spacewatch	WIT	810 m	MPC · JPL
521460	2015 OP_{91}	—	May 25, 2014	Haleakala	Pan-STARRS 1	·	3.0 km	MPC · JPL
521461	2015 OQ_{91}	—	October 7, 2008	Kitt Peak	Spacewatch	·	1.0 km	MPC · JPL
521462	2015 OS_{91}	—	July 19, 2015	Haleakala	Pan-STARRS 1	·	2.5 km	MPC · JPL
521463	2015 OU_{91}	—	September 27, 2011	Mount Lemmon	Mount Lemmon Survey	·	2.1 km	MPC · JPL
521464	2015 OW_{91}	—	January 18, 2013	Mount Lemmon	Mount Lemmon Survey	·	1.3 km	MPC · JPL
521465	2015 OY_{91}	—	September 23, 2011	Kitt Peak	Spacewatch	·	1.5 km	MPC · JPL
521466	2015 OA_{92}	—	September 28, 2011	Kitt Peak	Spacewatch	AGN	980 m	MPC · JPL
521467	2015 OD_{92}	—	September 25, 2005	Kitt Peak	Spacewatch	·	2.7 km	MPC · JPL
521468	2015 OF_{92}	—	May 21, 2014	Haleakala	Pan-STARRS 1	EOS	2.1 km	MPC · JPL
521469	2015 OH_{92}	—	October 24, 2011	Haleakala	Pan-STARRS 1	·	1.4 km	MPC · JPL
521470	2015 OK_{92}	—	July 19, 2015	Haleakala	Pan-STARRS 1	·	3.0 km	MPC · JPL
521471	2015 OM_{92}	—	October 17, 2010	Mount Lemmon	Mount Lemmon Survey	·	2.9 km	MPC · JPL
521472	2015 OT_{92}	—	May 7, 2014	Haleakala	Pan-STARRS 1	WIT	1.0 km	MPC · JPL
521473	2015 OV_{92}	—	August 10, 2010	WISE	WISE	·	4.3 km	MPC · JPL
521474	2015 OW_{92}	—	May 5, 2014	Mount Lemmon	Mount Lemmon Survey	·	1.1 km	MPC · JPL
521475	2015 OY_{92}	—	March 24, 2003	Kitt Peak	Spacewatch	EOS	2.1 km	MPC · JPL
521476	2015 OZ_{92}	—	March 11, 2013	Catalina	CSS	·	3.4 km	MPC · JPL
521477	2015 OD_{93}	—	April 29, 2014	Haleakala	Pan-STARRS 1	·	1.8 km	MPC · JPL
521478	2015 OH_{93}	—	March 27, 2008	Kitt Peak	Spacewatch	·	2.9 km	MPC · JPL
521479	2015 OS_{93}	—	October 1, 2010	Mount Lemmon	Mount Lemmon Survey	·	2.7 km	MPC · JPL
521480	2015 OV_{93}	—	August 22, 2004	Kitt Peak	Spacewatch	EOS	2.2 km	MPC · JPL
521481	2015 OW_{93}	—	June 15, 2009	Mount Lemmon	Mount Lemmon Survey	VER	2.8 km	MPC · JPL
521482	2015 OA_{94}	—	August 10, 2007	Kitt Peak	Spacewatch	·	1.1 km	MPC · JPL
521483	2015 OC_{94}	—	September 18, 2010	Mount Lemmon	Mount Lemmon Survey	·	2.4 km	MPC · JPL
521484	2015 OD_{94}	—	April 30, 2014	Haleakala	Pan-STARRS 1	·	1.4 km	MPC · JPL
521485	2015 OE_{94}	—	September 1, 2005	Kitt Peak	Spacewatch	KOR	1.4 km	MPC · JPL
521486	2015 OF_{94}	—	January 27, 2007	Kitt Peak	Spacewatch	·	2.7 km	MPC · JPL
521487	2015 OG_{94}	—	February 15, 2013	Haleakala	Pan-STARRS 1	·	3.5 km	MPC · JPL
521488	2015 OH_{94}	—	April 9, 2010	Kitt Peak	Spacewatch	·	1.1 km	MPC · JPL
521489	2015 OK_{94}	—	November 8, 2007	Mount Lemmon	Mount Lemmon Survey	WIT	830 m	MPC · JPL
521490	2015 OP_{94}	—	January 6, 2006	Kitt Peak	Spacewatch	·	2.7 km	MPC · JPL
521491	2015 OR_{94}	—	March 3, 2009	Mount Lemmon	Mount Lemmon Survey	MRX	1.0 km	MPC · JPL
521492	2015 OW_{94}	—	February 15, 2013	Haleakala	Pan-STARRS 1	URS	2.6 km	MPC · JPL
521493	2015 OX_{94}	—	March 8, 2014	Mount Lemmon	Mount Lemmon Survey	PHO	740 m	MPC · JPL
521494	2015 OB_{95}	—	October 19, 2010	Mount Lemmon	Mount Lemmon Survey	·	2.9 km	MPC · JPL
521495	2015 OD_{95}	—	February 28, 2008	Kitt Peak	Spacewatch	·	2.5 km	MPC · JPL
521496	2015 OF_{95}	—	June 29, 2005	Kitt Peak	Spacewatch	·	1.9 km	MPC · JPL
521497	2015 OG_{95}	—	January 16, 2008	Mount Lemmon	Mount Lemmon Survey	·	1.7 km	MPC · JPL
521498	2015 OH_{95}	—	January 26, 2006	Kitt Peak	Spacewatch	·	1.1 km	MPC · JPL
521499	2015 OJ_{95}	—	April 24, 2014	Haleakala	Pan-STARRS 1	·	1.4 km	MPC · JPL
521500	2015 OM_{95}	—	March 3, 2009	Kitt Peak	Spacewatch	·	1.4 km	MPC · JPL

== 521501–521600 ==
back to top

Designation			Discovery			Properties		Ref
Permanent	Provisional	Named after	Date	Site	Discoverer(s)	Category	Diam.	Ref
521501	2015 OR_{95}	—	February 8, 2013	Haleakala	Pan-STARRS 1	·	1.4 km	MPC · JPL
521502	2015 OU_{95}	—	January 17, 2007	Kitt Peak	Spacewatch	·	2.4 km	MPC · JPL
521503	2015 OX_{95}	—	October 20, 2011	Mount Lemmon	Mount Lemmon Survey	·	1.5 km	MPC · JPL
521504	2015 OA_{96}	—	November 13, 2010	Mount Lemmon	Mount Lemmon Survey	HYG	2.9 km	MPC · JPL
521505	2015 OC_{96}	—	August 31, 2005	Kitt Peak	Spacewatch	·	1.7 km	MPC · JPL
521506	2015 OD_{96}	—	September 26, 2006	Kitt Peak	Spacewatch	·	1.8 km	MPC · JPL
521507	2015 OL_{96}	—	November 6, 2007	Kitt Peak	Spacewatch	·	1.3 km	MPC · JPL
521508	2015 ON_{96}	—	February 26, 2014	Haleakala	Pan-STARRS 1	·	1.1 km	MPC · JPL
521509	2015 OO_{96}	—	February 1, 2009	Kitt Peak	Spacewatch	·	1.8 km	MPC · JPL
521510	2015 OQ_{96}	—	November 19, 2006	Kitt Peak	Spacewatch	KOR	1.3 km	MPC · JPL
521511	2015 OR_{96}	—	February 26, 2014	Haleakala	Pan-STARRS 1	PHO	680 m	MPC · JPL
521512	2015 OV_{96}	—	November 6, 2010	Mount Lemmon	Mount Lemmon Survey	·	2.7 km	MPC · JPL
521513	2015 OX_{96}	—	January 25, 2007	Kitt Peak	Spacewatch	EOS	1.6 km	MPC · JPL
521514	2015 OA_{97}	—	March 11, 2007	Kitt Peak	Spacewatch	·	2.8 km	MPC · JPL
521515	2015 OB_{97}	—	November 6, 2010	Mount Lemmon	Mount Lemmon Survey	CYB	3.9 km	MPC · JPL
521516	2015 OF_{97}	—	October 6, 2011	Mount Lemmon	Mount Lemmon Survey	·	1.3 km	MPC · JPL
521517	2015 OJ_{97}	—	November 13, 2012	Mount Lemmon	Mount Lemmon Survey	·	980 m	MPC · JPL
521518	2015 ON_{97}	—	July 24, 2015	Haleakala	Pan-STARRS 1	·	2.6 km	MPC · JPL
521519	2015 OR_{97}	—	April 8, 2014	Mount Lemmon	Mount Lemmon Survey	·	1.5 km	MPC · JPL
521520	2015 OV_{97}	—	August 28, 2006	Kitt Peak	Spacewatch	·	1.9 km	MPC · JPL
521521	2015 OW_{97}	—	December 6, 2007	Kitt Peak	Spacewatch	·	1.6 km	MPC · JPL
521522	2015 OD_{98}	—	May 24, 2014	Mount Lemmon	Mount Lemmon Survey	·	1.8 km	MPC · JPL
521523	2015 OM_{98}	—	October 31, 2010	Mount Lemmon	Mount Lemmon Survey	·	2.6 km	MPC · JPL
521524	2015 OP_{98}	—	July 24, 2015	Haleakala	Pan-STARRS 1	MRX	1.0 km	MPC · JPL
521525	2015 OW_{98}	—	March 13, 2013	Mount Lemmon	Mount Lemmon Survey	·	2.9 km	MPC · JPL
521526	2015 OZ_{98}	—	November 7, 2012	Haleakala	Pan-STARRS 1	·	1.1 km	MPC · JPL
521527	2015 OE_{99}	—	June 27, 2014	Haleakala	Pan-STARRS 1	·	2.0 km	MPC · JPL
521528	2015 OL_{99}	—	April 5, 2014	Haleakala	Pan-STARRS 1	KOR	1.0 km	MPC · JPL
521529	2015 OR_{99}	—	December 12, 2006	Mount Lemmon	Mount Lemmon Survey	·	2.2 km	MPC · JPL
521530	2015 OW_{99}	—	December 3, 2005	Kitt Peak	Spacewatch	·	2.6 km	MPC · JPL
521531	2015 OX_{99}	—	August 6, 2010	WISE	WISE	·	2.7 km	MPC · JPL
521532	2015 OB_{100}	—	September 11, 2010	Mount Lemmon	Mount Lemmon Survey	·	2.6 km	MPC · JPL
521533	2015 OC_{100}	—	October 27, 2011	Mount Lemmon	Mount Lemmon Survey	·	1.3 km	MPC · JPL
521534	2015 OK_{100}	—	February 3, 2013	Haleakala	Pan-STARRS 1	·	1.3 km	MPC · JPL
521535	2015 OL_{100}	—	September 29, 2010	Mount Lemmon	Mount Lemmon Survey	·	2.2 km	MPC · JPL
521536	2015 OO_{100}	—	April 5, 2014	Haleakala	Pan-STARRS 1	·	1.5 km	MPC · JPL
521537	2015 OP_{100}	—	November 4, 2010	Mount Lemmon	Mount Lemmon Survey	VER	2.3 km	MPC · JPL
521538	2015 OQ_{100}	—	February 13, 2008	Kitt Peak	Spacewatch	·	1.5 km	MPC · JPL
521539	2015 OU_{100}	—	April 29, 2008	Mount Lemmon	Mount Lemmon Survey	VER	2.2 km	MPC · JPL
521540	2015 OX_{100}	—	November 13, 2010	Mount Lemmon	Mount Lemmon Survey	·	2.9 km	MPC · JPL
521541	2015 OD_{101}	—	November 2, 2010	Mount Lemmon	Mount Lemmon Survey	·	2.9 km	MPC · JPL
521542	2015 OF_{101}	—	December 21, 2012	Mount Lemmon	Mount Lemmon Survey	EUN	1.2 km	MPC · JPL
521543	2015 OG_{101}	—	March 4, 2013	Haleakala	Pan-STARRS 1	·	3.0 km	MPC · JPL
521544	2015 OK_{101}	—	July 17, 2010	WISE	WISE	·	2.8 km	MPC · JPL
521545	2015 OM_{101}	—	December 29, 2011	Mount Lemmon	Mount Lemmon Survey	·	2.6 km	MPC · JPL
521546	2015 ON_{101}	—	November 14, 2010	Kitt Peak	Spacewatch	·	2.6 km	MPC · JPL
521547	2015 OR_{101}	—	January 28, 2007	Kitt Peak	Spacewatch	·	3.0 km	MPC · JPL
521548	2015 OZ_{101}	—	December 31, 2007	Kitt Peak	Spacewatch	·	2.1 km	MPC · JPL
521549	2015 OF_{102}	—	July 25, 2015	Haleakala	Pan-STARRS 1	·	1.8 km	MPC · JPL
521550	2015 OH_{102}	—	December 10, 2005	Kitt Peak	Spacewatch	·	2.6 km	MPC · JPL
521551	2015 OK_{102}	—	November 30, 2005	Kitt Peak	Spacewatch	·	2.4 km	MPC · JPL
521552	2015 OU_{102}	—	December 1, 2011	Haleakala	Pan-STARRS 1	·	1.6 km	MPC · JPL
521553	2015 OV_{102}	—	January 19, 2012	Haleakala	Pan-STARRS 1	·	2.6 km	MPC · JPL
521554	2015 OX_{102}	—	August 22, 2004	Kitt Peak	Spacewatch	EOS	1.7 km	MPC · JPL
521555	2015 OY_{102}	—	November 30, 2011	Mount Lemmon	Mount Lemmon Survey	·	1.9 km	MPC · JPL
521556	2015 OC_{103}	—	September 24, 2011	Haleakala	Pan-STARRS 1	·	1.7 km	MPC · JPL
521557	2015 OH_{103}	—	January 29, 2007	Kitt Peak	Spacewatch	·	2.7 km	MPC · JPL
521558	2015 OU_{103}	—	April 30, 2014	Haleakala	Pan-STARRS 1	BRA	1.5 km	MPC · JPL
521559	2015 OW_{103}	—	July 20, 2004	Siding Spring	SSS	·	2.6 km	MPC · JPL
521560	2015 OY_{103}	—	October 9, 2004	Kitt Peak	Spacewatch	·	3.4 km	MPC · JPL
521561	2015 OG_{104}	—	November 22, 2006	Kitt Peak	Spacewatch	KOR	1.3 km	MPC · JPL
521562	2015 OM_{104}	—	October 24, 2011	Haleakala	Pan-STARRS 1	EOS	2.1 km	MPC · JPL
521563	2015 OO_{104}	—	April 11, 2008	Mount Lemmon	Mount Lemmon Survey	·	2.7 km	MPC · JPL
521564	2015 OR_{104}	—	March 5, 2006	Kitt Peak	Spacewatch	·	980 m	MPC · JPL
521565	2015 OT_{104}	—	March 11, 2008	Kitt Peak	Spacewatch	THM	2.4 km	MPC · JPL
521566	2015 OU_{104}	—	February 8, 2008	Mount Lemmon	Mount Lemmon Survey	·	2.9 km	MPC · JPL
521567	2015 OW_{104}	—	December 28, 2011	Kitt Peak	Spacewatch	·	3.1 km	MPC · JPL
521568	2015 OA_{105}	—	July 28, 2015	Haleakala	Pan-STARRS 1	·	3.2 km	MPC · JPL
521569	2015 OG_{105}	—	March 31, 2008	Kitt Peak	Spacewatch	·	2.3 km	MPC · JPL
521570	2015 OJ_{105}	—	November 12, 2007	Mount Lemmon	Mount Lemmon Survey	GEF	1.2 km	MPC · JPL
521571	2015 OO_{105}	—	November 5, 2010	Mount Lemmon	Mount Lemmon Survey	·	3.7 km	MPC · JPL
521572	2015 PQ_{5}	—	June 11, 2005	Kitt Peak	Spacewatch	·	500 m	MPC · JPL
521573	2015 PQ_{30}	—	September 19, 2001	Kitt Peak	Spacewatch	·	830 m	MPC · JPL
521574	2015 PQ_{54}	—	January 31, 2006	Kitt Peak	Spacewatch	·	1.1 km	MPC · JPL
521575	2015 PR_{57}	—	July 29, 2008	Mount Lemmon	Mount Lemmon Survey	·	550 m	MPC · JPL
521576	2015 PX_{70}	—	March 11, 2014	Mount Lemmon	Mount Lemmon Survey	V	630 m	MPC · JPL
521577	2015 PK_{130}	—	January 13, 2005	Kitt Peak	Spacewatch	·	1.2 km	MPC · JPL
521578	2015 PU_{203}	—	April 1, 2005	Kitt Peak	Spacewatch	·	1.6 km	MPC · JPL
521579	2015 PK_{212}	—	October 3, 2003	Kitt Peak	Spacewatch	·	1.6 km	MPC · JPL
521580	2015 PD_{224}	—	May 29, 2011	Mount Lemmon	Mount Lemmon Survey	·	1.7 km	MPC · JPL
521581	2015 PG_{283}	—	March 19, 2009	Kitt Peak	Spacewatch	·	2.6 km	MPC · JPL
521582	2015 PS_{286}	—	May 26, 2007	Mount Lemmon	Mount Lemmon Survey	·	1.5 km	MPC · JPL
521583	2015 PT_{289}	—	December 7, 2012	Mount Lemmon	Mount Lemmon Survey	PHO	960 m	MPC · JPL
521584	2015 PZ_{301}	—	December 3, 2012	Mount Lemmon	Mount Lemmon Survey	·	990 m	MPC · JPL
521585	2015 PD_{302}	—	October 21, 2012	Haleakala	Pan-STARRS 1	·	1.1 km	MPC · JPL
521586	2015 PO_{309}	—	January 6, 2013	Kitt Peak	Spacewatch	·	2.0 km	MPC · JPL
521587	2015 PB_{311}	—	August 4, 2011	Haleakala	Pan-STARRS 1	·	1.4 km	MPC · JPL
521588	2015 PD_{314}	—	October 1, 2003	Anderson Mesa	LONEOS	·	1.1 km	MPC · JPL
521589	2015 PB_{316}	—	October 10, 2007	Mount Lemmon	Mount Lemmon Survey	·	1.5 km	MPC · JPL
521590	2015 PS_{316}	—	August 12, 2015	Haleakala	Pan-STARRS 1	·	2.3 km	MPC · JPL
521591	2015 PV_{316}	—	November 18, 2003	Kitt Peak	Spacewatch	·	1.6 km	MPC · JPL
521592	2015 PW_{316}	—	December 12, 2006	Kitt Peak	Spacewatch	·	1.6 km	MPC · JPL
521593	2015 PY_{316}	—	January 11, 2010	Kitt Peak	Spacewatch	PHO	800 m	MPC · JPL
521594	2015 PB_{317}	—	October 22, 2005	Kitt Peak	Spacewatch	·	2.9 km	MPC · JPL
521595	2015 PD_{317}	—	October 11, 2010	Mount Lemmon	Mount Lemmon Survey	·	3.1 km	MPC · JPL
521596	2015 PE_{317}	—	August 10, 2007	Kitt Peak	Spacewatch	·	1.1 km	MPC · JPL
521597	2015 PK_{317}	—	October 22, 2011	Mount Lemmon	Mount Lemmon Survey	·	1.7 km	MPC · JPL
521598	2015 PN_{317}	—	December 25, 2006	Kitt Peak	Spacewatch	·	1.8 km	MPC · JPL
521599	2015 PO_{317}	—	August 9, 2015	Haleakala	Pan-STARRS 1	·	3.1 km	MPC · JPL
521600	2015 PT_{317}	—	December 27, 2006	Mount Lemmon	Mount Lemmon Survey	·	2.2 km	MPC · JPL

== 521601–521700 ==
back to top

Designation			Discovery			Properties		Ref
Permanent	Provisional	Named after	Date	Site	Discoverer(s)	Category	Diam.	Ref
521601	2015 PW_{317}	—	March 30, 2008	Kitt Peak	Spacewatch	(43176)	2.4 km	MPC · JPL
521602	2015 PB_{318}	—	April 14, 2008	Kitt Peak	Spacewatch	·	2.9 km	MPC · JPL
521603	2015 PA_{319}	—	November 12, 2005	Kitt Peak	Spacewatch	·	2.1 km	MPC · JPL
521604	2015 PO_{319}	—	September 11, 2004	Kitt Peak	Spacewatch	·	2.4 km	MPC · JPL
521605	2015 PP_{319}	—	January 21, 2012	Kitt Peak	Spacewatch	·	2.8 km	MPC · JPL
521606	2015 PS_{319}	—	September 18, 2010	Mount Lemmon	Mount Lemmon Survey	·	2.8 km	MPC · JPL
521607	2015 PX_{319}	—	November 7, 2012	Haleakala	Pan-STARRS 1	·	1.0 km	MPC · JPL
521608	2015 PZ_{319}	—	August 24, 2011	Haleakala	Pan-STARRS 1	HNS	1.1 km	MPC · JPL
521609	2015 PA_{320}	—	October 24, 2011	Haleakala	Pan-STARRS 1	EOS	1.9 km	MPC · JPL
521610	2015 PC_{320}	—	December 16, 2006	Mount Lemmon	Mount Lemmon Survey	·	2.0 km	MPC · JPL
521611	2015 PE_{320}	—	February 21, 2007	Kitt Peak	Spacewatch	·	2.9 km	MPC · JPL
521612	2015 PH_{320}	—	February 19, 2012	Kitt Peak	Spacewatch	·	3.5 km	MPC · JPL
521613	2015 PK_{320}	—	April 5, 2008	Mount Lemmon	Mount Lemmon Survey	·	1.8 km	MPC · JPL
521614	2015 PN_{320}	—	October 22, 2006	Kitt Peak	Spacewatch	·	1.9 km	MPC · JPL
521615	2015 PO_{320}	—	November 20, 2007	Kitt Peak	Spacewatch	(5)	1.0 km	MPC · JPL
521616	2015 PR_{320}	—	May 7, 2014	Haleakala	Pan-STARRS 1	·	1.6 km	MPC · JPL
521617	2015 PV_{320}	—	February 28, 2008	Mount Lemmon	Mount Lemmon Survey	KOR	1.4 km	MPC · JPL
521618	2015 PW_{320}	—	August 22, 2011	La Sagra	OAM	·	1.2 km	MPC · JPL
521619	2015 PB_{321}	—	August 12, 2015	Haleakala	Pan-STARRS 1	·	2.6 km	MPC · JPL
521620	2015 PG_{321}	—	August 8, 2010	WISE	WISE	·	3.7 km	MPC · JPL
521621	2015 PJ_{321}	—	August 12, 2015	Haleakala	Pan-STARRS 1	HNS	990 m	MPC · JPL
521622	2015 PK_{321}	—	August 13, 2015	Kitt Peak	Spacewatch	·	1.9 km	MPC · JPL
521623	2015 PN_{321}	—	January 26, 2007	Kitt Peak	Spacewatch	·	2.4 km	MPC · JPL
521624	2015 PQ_{321}	—	December 13, 2006	Kitt Peak	Spacewatch	EOS	1.7 km	MPC · JPL
521625	2015 PV_{321}	—	October 24, 2011	Kitt Peak	Spacewatch	HOF	2.5 km	MPC · JPL
521626	2015 PC_{322}	—	October 25, 2011	Haleakala	Pan-STARRS 1	HOF	2.0 km	MPC · JPL
521627	2015 PN_{322}	—	April 30, 2014	Haleakala	Pan-STARRS 1	·	1.7 km	MPC · JPL
521628	2015 PP_{322}	—	August 9, 2005	Cerro Tololo	Deep Ecliptic Survey	KOR	1.2 km	MPC · JPL
521629	2015 PZ_{322}	—	February 11, 2008	Mount Lemmon	Mount Lemmon Survey	·	1.9 km	MPC · JPL
521630	2015 PE_{323}	—	January 27, 2012	Mount Lemmon	Mount Lemmon Survey	·	2.3 km	MPC · JPL
521631	2015 QW_{14}	—	November 7, 2008	Mount Lemmon	Mount Lemmon Survey	·	1.1 km	MPC · JPL
521632	2015 QZ_{14}	—	March 9, 2007	Kitt Peak	Spacewatch	·	2.1 km	MPC · JPL
521633	2015 QD_{15}	—	January 5, 2006	Kitt Peak	Spacewatch	·	1.4 km	MPC · JPL
521634	2015 QG_{16}	—	February 23, 2007	Kitt Peak	Spacewatch	·	2.5 km	MPC · JPL
521635	2015 QH_{16}	—	February 20, 2002	Kitt Peak	Spacewatch	·	2.2 km	MPC · JPL
521636	2015 QJ_{16}	—	May 13, 2008	Mount Lemmon	Mount Lemmon Survey	VER	2.5 km	MPC · JPL
521637	2015 QO_{16}	—	October 20, 2006	Kitt Peak	Spacewatch	·	1.5 km	MPC · JPL
521638	2015 QR_{16}	—	May 9, 2014	Haleakala	Pan-STARRS 1	·	1.1 km	MPC · JPL
521639	2015 QU_{16}	—	January 27, 2007	Kitt Peak	Spacewatch	·	2.5 km	MPC · JPL
521640	2015 QV_{16}	—	September 19, 2006	Kitt Peak	Spacewatch	AGN	1.2 km	MPC · JPL
521641	2015 QW_{16}	—	October 12, 2010	Mount Lemmon	Mount Lemmon Survey	·	2.6 km	MPC · JPL
521642	2015 QG_{17}	—	March 13, 2007	Mount Lemmon	Mount Lemmon Survey	·	2.6 km	MPC · JPL
521643	2015 QM_{17}	—	March 2, 2008	Kitt Peak	Spacewatch	·	1.7 km	MPC · JPL
521644	2015 QP_{17}	—	August 30, 2005	Kitt Peak	Spacewatch	·	1.8 km	MPC · JPL
521645	2015 QR_{17}	—	January 19, 2012	Mount Lemmon	Mount Lemmon Survey	TIR	2.2 km	MPC · JPL
521646	2015 QW_{17}	—	January 19, 2012	Kitt Peak	Spacewatch	·	2.5 km	MPC · JPL
521647	2015 QB_{18}	—	April 4, 2008	Kitt Peak	Spacewatch	EOS	1.9 km	MPC · JPL
521648	2015 QJ_{18}	—	January 21, 2012	Kitt Peak	Spacewatch	·	2.5 km	MPC · JPL
521649	2015 QK_{18}	—	April 10, 2013	Haleakala	Pan-STARRS 1	·	3.2 km	MPC · JPL
521650	2015 QY_{18}	—	September 19, 2006	Catalina	CSS	·	1.7 km	MPC · JPL
521651	2015 QA_{19}	—	May 10, 2014	Haleakala	Pan-STARRS 1	·	1.3 km	MPC · JPL
521652	2015 QB_{19}	—	June 27, 2014	Haleakala	Pan-STARRS 1	·	2.4 km	MPC · JPL
521653	2015 RY_{5}	—	March 25, 2014	Mount Lemmon	Mount Lemmon Survey	·	1.2 km	MPC · JPL
521654	2015 RS_{16}	—	October 19, 2011	Kitt Peak	Spacewatch	·	1.8 km	MPC · JPL
521655	2015 RL_{33}	—	May 1, 2009	Kitt Peak	Spacewatch	·	2.1 km	MPC · JPL
521656	2015 RG_{40}	—	November 1, 2010	Mount Lemmon	Mount Lemmon Survey	·	2.1 km	MPC · JPL
521657	2015 RU_{65}	—	July 26, 2011	Haleakala	Pan-STARRS 1	NYS	1.2 km	MPC · JPL
521658	2015 RT_{66}	—	March 16, 2010	Kitt Peak	Spacewatch	MAS	700 m	MPC · JPL
521659	2015 RB_{84}	—	August 4, 2011	La Sagra	OAM	·	1.5 km	MPC · JPL
521660	2015 RM_{93}	—	February 3, 2013	Haleakala	Pan-STARRS 1	PHO	940 m	MPC · JPL
521661	2015 RC_{99}	—	July 28, 2011	Haleakala	Pan-STARRS 1	SUL	1.9 km	MPC · JPL
521662	2015 RJ_{103}	—	November 6, 2008	Mount Lemmon	Mount Lemmon Survey	·	1.2 km	MPC · JPL
521663	2015 RC_{109}	—	August 1, 2011	Haleakala	Pan-STARRS 1	·	1.3 km	MPC · JPL
521664	2015 RK_{115}	—	March 18, 2010	Mount Lemmon	Mount Lemmon Survey	·	1.5 km	MPC · JPL
521665	2015 RB_{116}	—	October 24, 2008	Catalina	CSS	·	1.1 km	MPC · JPL
521666	2015 RV_{142}	—	May 7, 2010	Mount Lemmon	Mount Lemmon Survey	·	1.1 km	MPC · JPL
521667	2015 RB_{200}	—	April 29, 2014	Kitt Peak	Spacewatch	·	1.1 km	MPC · JPL
521668	2015 RU_{203}	—	August 12, 2015	Haleakala	Pan-STARRS 1	·	1.9 km	MPC · JPL
521669	2015 RZ_{208}	—	September 23, 2008	Kitt Peak	Spacewatch	·	910 m	MPC · JPL
521670	2015 RP_{213}	—	September 17, 2004	Kitt Peak	Spacewatch	·	1.0 km	MPC · JPL
521671	2015 RZ_{235}	—	February 7, 2008	Kitt Peak	Spacewatch	·	2.0 km	MPC · JPL
521672	2015 RH_{240}	—	June 8, 2013	Mount Lemmon	Mount Lemmon Survey	·	1.8 km	MPC · JPL
521673	2015 RU_{240}	—	August 15, 2014	Haleakala	Pan-STARRS 1	·	2.0 km	MPC · JPL
521674	2015 RK_{242}	—	October 23, 2011	Haleakala	Pan-STARRS 1	·	1.1 km	MPC · JPL
521675	2015 RH_{253}	—	May 14, 2005	Mount Lemmon	Mount Lemmon Survey	·	2.1 km	MPC · JPL
521676	2015 RA_{254}	—	February 17, 2010	Kitt Peak	Spacewatch	·	1.2 km	MPC · JPL
521677	2015 RP_{256}	—	March 15, 2012	Mount Lemmon	Mount Lemmon Survey	·	2.3 km	MPC · JPL
521678	2015 RH_{260}	—	September 9, 2015	Haleakala	Pan-STARRS 1	·	1.3 km	MPC · JPL
521679	2015 RE_{261}	—	March 26, 2009	Kitt Peak	Spacewatch	HNS	1.1 km	MPC · JPL
521680	2015 RK_{261}	—	December 28, 2002	Kitt Peak	Spacewatch	TIN	1.4 km	MPC · JPL
521681	2015 RR_{261}	—	September 15, 2006	Kitt Peak	Spacewatch	AGN	910 m	MPC · JPL
521682	2015 RS_{261}	—	August 28, 2006	Kitt Peak	Spacewatch	·	1.4 km	MPC · JPL
521683	2015 RU_{261}	—	August 27, 2009	Kitt Peak	Spacewatch	·	3.6 km	MPC · JPL
521684	2015 RY_{261}	—	February 5, 2013	Kitt Peak	Spacewatch	·	1.7 km	MPC · JPL
521685	2015 RZ_{261}	—	February 24, 2009	Kitt Peak	Spacewatch	·	1.5 km	MPC · JPL
521686	2015 RC_{262}	—	September 4, 2011	Haleakala	Pan-STARRS 1	·	900 m	MPC · JPL
521687	2015 RD_{262}	—	February 17, 2001	Kitt Peak	Spacewatch	·	2.4 km	MPC · JPL
521688	2015 RH_{262}	—	September 18, 2006	Kitt Peak	Spacewatch	HOF	2.1 km	MPC · JPL
521689	2015 RL_{262}	—	February 7, 2013	Kitt Peak	Spacewatch	·	1.5 km	MPC · JPL
521690	2015 RM_{262}	—	March 9, 2007	Kitt Peak	Spacewatch	·	2.6 km	MPC · JPL
521691	2015 RT_{262}	—	April 14, 2008	Kitt Peak	Spacewatch	EOS	1.9 km	MPC · JPL
521692	2015 RY_{262}	—	September 18, 2010	Mount Lemmon	Mount Lemmon Survey	·	1.9 km	MPC · JPL
521693	2015 RZ_{262}	—	February 15, 2013	Haleakala	Pan-STARRS 1	·	2.0 km	MPC · JPL
521694	2015 RB_{263}	—	January 14, 2008	Kitt Peak	Spacewatch	WIT	1.0 km	MPC · JPL
521695	2015 RD_{263}	—	September 15, 2007	Kitt Peak	Spacewatch	·	1.2 km	MPC · JPL
521696	2015 RG_{263}	—	March 14, 2007	Kitt Peak	Spacewatch	·	2.8 km	MPC · JPL
521697	2015 RK_{263}	—	August 27, 2009	Kitt Peak	Spacewatch	·	2.7 km	MPC · JPL
521698	2015 RO_{263}	—	May 3, 2008	Kitt Peak	Spacewatch	·	2.4 km	MPC · JPL
521699	2015 RP_{263}	—	March 31, 2008	Mount Lemmon	Mount Lemmon Survey	·	2.9 km	MPC · JPL
521700	2015 RT_{263}	—	April 3, 2008	Mount Lemmon	Mount Lemmon Survey	·	2.7 km	MPC · JPL

== 521701–521800 ==
back to top

Designation			Discovery			Properties		Ref
Permanent	Provisional	Named after	Date	Site	Discoverer(s)	Category	Diam.	Ref
521701	2015 RU_{263}	—	April 24, 2014	Haleakala	Pan-STARRS 1	·	1.8 km	MPC · JPL
521702	2015 RV_{263}	—	April 14, 2008	Mount Lemmon	Mount Lemmon Survey	·	3.2 km	MPC · JPL
521703	2015 RW_{263}	—	September 27, 2006	Mount Lemmon	Mount Lemmon Survey	·	2.0 km	MPC · JPL
521704	2015 RZ_{263}	—	June 29, 2010	WISE	WISE	·	2.2 km	MPC · JPL
521705	2015 RD_{264}	—	February 28, 2009	Kitt Peak	Spacewatch	WIT	880 m	MPC · JPL
521706	2015 RF_{264}	—	January 10, 2013	Haleakala	Pan-STARRS 1	·	1.4 km	MPC · JPL
521707	2015 RM_{264}	—	February 17, 2013	Kitt Peak	Spacewatch	KOR	1.3 km	MPC · JPL
521708	2015 RO_{264}	—	April 1, 2014	Kitt Peak	Spacewatch	·	1.0 km	MPC · JPL
521709	2015 RP_{264}	—	September 14, 2010	Mount Lemmon	Mount Lemmon Survey	·	2.5 km	MPC · JPL
521710	2015 RQ_{264}	—	August 31, 2005	Kitt Peak	Spacewatch	KOR	1.2 km	MPC · JPL
521711	2015 RL_{265}	—	November 13, 2010	Mount Lemmon	Mount Lemmon Survey	·	2.5 km	MPC · JPL
521712	2015 RY_{265}	—	October 2, 2006	Mount Lemmon	Mount Lemmon Survey	·	1.4 km	MPC · JPL
521713	2015 RU_{266}	—	September 30, 2006	Mount Lemmon	Mount Lemmon Survey	·	1.5 km	MPC · JPL
521714	2015 RY_{266}	—	July 25, 2014	Haleakala	Pan-STARRS 1	·	2.3 km	MPC · JPL
521715	2015 RZ_{266}	—	July 25, 2014	Haleakala	Pan-STARRS 1	·	1.0 km	MPC · JPL
521716	2015 RA_{267}	—	June 8, 2013	Mount Lemmon	Mount Lemmon Survey	·	2.4 km	MPC · JPL
521717	2015 RD_{267}	—	November 12, 2005	Kitt Peak	Spacewatch	·	1.9 km	MPC · JPL
521718	2015 RE_{267}	—	March 18, 2009	Kitt Peak	Spacewatch	HNS	1.1 km	MPC · JPL
521719	2015 RO_{267}	—	September 30, 2010	Mount Lemmon	Mount Lemmon Survey	·	1.4 km	MPC · JPL
521720	2015 RQ_{267}	—	April 7, 2013	Mount Lemmon	Mount Lemmon Survey	·	1.9 km	MPC · JPL
521721	2015 RA_{268}	—	November 19, 2007	Kitt Peak	Spacewatch	·	1.3 km	MPC · JPL
521722	2015 RJ_{268}	—	January 26, 2012	Mount Lemmon	Mount Lemmon Survey	·	1.6 km	MPC · JPL
521723	2015 RV_{268}	—	June 25, 2014	Mount Lemmon	Mount Lemmon Survey	·	1.8 km	MPC · JPL
521724	2015 RX_{268}	—	October 28, 2011	Mount Lemmon	Mount Lemmon Survey	·	1.6 km	MPC · JPL
521725	2015 RC_{269}	—	August 29, 2006	Kitt Peak	Spacewatch	·	1.2 km	MPC · JPL
521726	2015 RH_{269}	—	September 24, 2000	Kitt Peak	Spacewatch	KOR	1.4 km	MPC · JPL
521727	2015 RJ_{269}	—	October 2, 2006	Mount Lemmon	Mount Lemmon Survey	·	1.4 km	MPC · JPL
521728	2015 RS_{269}	—	December 7, 2005	Kitt Peak	Spacewatch	·	2.9 km	MPC · JPL
521729	2015 RT_{269}	—	February 4, 2012	Haleakala	Pan-STARRS 1	VER	2.5 km	MPC · JPL
521730	2015 RX_{269}	—	April 2, 2005	Kitt Peak	Spacewatch	KON	1.9 km	MPC · JPL
521731	2015 RB_{270}	—	March 8, 2013	Haleakala	Pan-STARRS 1	EOS	1.5 km	MPC · JPL
521732	2015 RF_{270}	—	September 17, 2006	Kitt Peak	Spacewatch	·	1.5 km	MPC · JPL
521733	2015 RS_{270}	—	February 24, 2012	Mount Lemmon	Mount Lemmon Survey	CYB	2.7 km	MPC · JPL
521734	2015 RV_{270}	—	September 19, 2006	Kitt Peak	Spacewatch	PAD	1.3 km	MPC · JPL
521735	2015 RW_{270}	—	October 11, 2010	Mount Lemmon	Mount Lemmon Survey	·	2.1 km	MPC · JPL
521736	2015 RD_{271}	—	February 28, 2009	Kitt Peak	Spacewatch	AEO	830 m	MPC · JPL
521737	2015 RK_{271}	—	October 17, 2010	Mount Lemmon	Mount Lemmon Survey	·	2.4 km	MPC · JPL
521738	2015 RN_{271}	—	April 9, 2013	Haleakala	Pan-STARRS 1	·	2.1 km	MPC · JPL
521739	2015 RM_{272}	—	September 2, 2010	Mount Lemmon	Mount Lemmon Survey	KOR	1.3 km	MPC · JPL
521740	2015 RQ_{272}	—	January 19, 2012	Haleakala	Pan-STARRS 1	·	2.2 km	MPC · JPL
521741	2015 RR_{272}	—	March 19, 2013	Haleakala	Pan-STARRS 1	EOS	1.6 km	MPC · JPL
521742	2015 RS_{272}	—	December 13, 2010	Mount Lemmon	Mount Lemmon Survey	·	1.8 km	MPC · JPL
521743	2015 RT_{272}	—	October 2, 2006	Mount Lemmon	Mount Lemmon Survey	·	1.9 km	MPC · JPL
521744	2015 RU_{272}	—	August 27, 2006	Kitt Peak	Spacewatch	·	1.5 km	MPC · JPL
521745	2015 RM_{273}	—	January 19, 2012	Haleakala	Pan-STARRS 1	·	1.7 km	MPC · JPL
521746	2015 RN_{273}	—	October 3, 2005	Kitt Peak	Spacewatch	·	1.9 km	MPC · JPL
521747	2015 RO_{273}	—	September 12, 2015	Haleakala	Pan-STARRS 1	LUT	3.6 km	MPC · JPL
521748	2015 RP_{273}	—	September 16, 2010	Mount Lemmon	Mount Lemmon Survey	·	3.0 km	MPC · JPL
521749	2015 RC_{274}	—	April 13, 2013	Haleakala	Pan-STARRS 1	EOS	1.8 km	MPC · JPL
521750	2015 RF_{274}	—	November 11, 2010	Mount Lemmon	Mount Lemmon Survey	·	1.9 km	MPC · JPL
521751	2015 RN_{274}	—	October 28, 2005	Kitt Peak	Spacewatch	·	1.5 km	MPC · JPL
521752	2015 RO_{274}	—	December 30, 2005	Kitt Peak	Spacewatch	THM	1.8 km	MPC · JPL
521753	2015 RP_{274}	—	September 12, 2005	Kitt Peak	Spacewatch	KOR	1.1 km	MPC · JPL
521754	2015 RT_{274}	—	November 13, 2010	Mount Lemmon	Mount Lemmon Survey	·	1.9 km	MPC · JPL
521755	2015 RU_{274}	—	October 26, 2005	Kitt Peak	Spacewatch	·	1.9 km	MPC · JPL
521756	2015 RE_{275}	—	April 9, 2013	Haleakala	Pan-STARRS 1	·	3.0 km	MPC · JPL
521757	2015 RP_{275}	—	March 12, 2013	Mount Lemmon	Mount Lemmon Survey	·	1.4 km	MPC · JPL
521758	2015 RU_{275}	—	October 17, 2010	Mount Lemmon	Mount Lemmon Survey	·	2.0 km	MPC · JPL
521759	2015 RY_{275}	—	December 6, 2005	Kitt Peak	Spacewatch	·	2.2 km	MPC · JPL
521760	2015 RB_{276}	—	March 10, 2008	Kitt Peak	Spacewatch	EOS	1.7 km	MPC · JPL
521761	2015 RO_{276}	—	January 19, 2012	Haleakala	Pan-STARRS 1	EOS	1.5 km	MPC · JPL
521762	2015 RP_{276}	—	April 25, 2014	Mount Lemmon	Mount Lemmon Survey	·	850 m	MPC · JPL
521763	2015 RQ_{276}	—	October 26, 2011	Haleakala	Pan-STARRS 1	·	1.4 km	MPC · JPL
521764	2015 RS_{276}	—	July 8, 2014	Haleakala	Pan-STARRS 1	·	2.9 km	MPC · JPL
521765	2015 RW_{276}	—	June 27, 2014	Haleakala	Pan-STARRS 1	·	1.7 km	MPC · JPL
521766	2015 RZ_{276}	—	August 27, 2009	Kitt Peak	Spacewatch	EOS	1.5 km	MPC · JPL
521767	2015 SV	—	June 18, 2010	Mount Lemmon	Mount Lemmon Survey	BAR	1.1 km	MPC · JPL
521768	2015 SA_{5}	—	April 22, 2004	Kitt Peak	Spacewatch	·	660 m	MPC · JPL
521769	2015 ST_{7}	—	June 5, 2011	Mount Lemmon	Mount Lemmon Survey	·	1.4 km	MPC · JPL
521770	2015 SP_{19}	—	December 5, 2007	Mount Lemmon	Mount Lemmon Survey	·	1.1 km	MPC · JPL
521771	2015 SG_{24}	—	November 7, 2007	Catalina	CSS	·	1.5 km	MPC · JPL
521772	2015 ST_{25}	—	March 13, 2013	Kitt Peak	Spacewatch	·	2.7 km	MPC · JPL
521773	2015 SZ_{25}	—	March 19, 2009	Kitt Peak	Spacewatch	·	2.1 km	MPC · JPL
521774	2015 SB_{26}	—	October 11, 2010	Kitt Peak	Spacewatch	EOS	1.4 km	MPC · JPL
521775	2015 SC_{26}	—	February 23, 2012	Mount Lemmon	Mount Lemmon Survey	·	1.9 km	MPC · JPL
521776	2015 SX_{26}	—	March 12, 2007	Mount Lemmon	Mount Lemmon Survey	·	2.5 km	MPC · JPL
521777	2015 SB_{27}	—	November 8, 2010	Kitt Peak	Spacewatch	·	2.9 km	MPC · JPL
521778	2015 SD_{27}	—	April 5, 2014	Haleakala	Pan-STARRS 1	·	1.2 km	MPC · JPL
521779	2015 SE_{27}	—	February 28, 2012	Haleakala	Pan-STARRS 1	·	2.3 km	MPC · JPL
521780	2015 SH_{27}	—	April 3, 2008	Mount Lemmon	Mount Lemmon Survey	TEL	1.2 km	MPC · JPL
521781	2015 SL_{27}	—	October 12, 2010	Catalina	CSS	·	2.1 km	MPC · JPL
521782	2015 SR_{27}	—	November 24, 2011	Mount Lemmon	Mount Lemmon Survey	·	2.3 km	MPC · JPL
521783	2015 SX_{27}	—	November 14, 2010	Mount Lemmon	Mount Lemmon Survey	·	2.2 km	MPC · JPL
521784	2015 SY_{27}	—	April 3, 2008	Kitt Peak	Spacewatch	·	2.6 km	MPC · JPL
521785	2015 SZ_{27}	—	June 4, 2014	Haleakala	Pan-STARRS 1	VER	2.3 km	MPC · JPL
521786	2015 SF_{28}	—	December 5, 2010	Mount Lemmon	Mount Lemmon Survey	·	2.6 km	MPC · JPL
521787	2015 SH_{28}	—	March 1, 2012	Mount Lemmon	Mount Lemmon Survey	·	2.5 km	MPC · JPL
521788	2015 SM_{28}	—	April 6, 2008	Kitt Peak	Spacewatch	EOS	1.8 km	MPC · JPL
521789	2015 SC_{29}	—	November 15, 2006	Mount Lemmon	Mount Lemmon Survey	·	2.2 km	MPC · JPL
521790	2015 SF_{29}	—	November 3, 2010	Kitt Peak	Spacewatch	·	2.1 km	MPC · JPL
521791	2015 SM_{29}	—	December 10, 2005	Kitt Peak	Spacewatch	EOS	1.4 km	MPC · JPL
521792	2015 SW_{29}	—	May 7, 2014	Haleakala	Pan-STARRS 1	BRA	1.7 km	MPC · JPL
521793	2015 SC_{30}	—	October 31, 2010	Mount Lemmon	Mount Lemmon Survey	·	2.1 km	MPC · JPL
521794	2015 SK_{30}	—	February 19, 2009	Kitt Peak	Spacewatch	HNS	820 m	MPC · JPL
521795	2015 SL_{30}	—	February 27, 2012	Haleakala	Pan-STARRS 1	·	3.2 km	MPC · JPL
521796	2015 TN_{2}	—	October 23, 2008	Kitt Peak	Spacewatch	MAS	620 m	MPC · JPL
521797	2015 TA_{7}	—	April 3, 2008	Kitt Peak	Spacewatch	·	520 m	MPC · JPL
521798	2015 TG_{18}	—	May 3, 2014	Kitt Peak	Spacewatch	MAR	940 m	MPC · JPL
521799	2015 TU_{71}	—	April 13, 2010	WISE	WISE	·	1.8 km	MPC · JPL
521800	2015 TR_{72}	—	December 10, 2010	Mount Lemmon	Mount Lemmon Survey	·	2.8 km	MPC · JPL

== 521801–521900 ==
back to top

Designation			Discovery			Properties		Ref
Permanent	Provisional	Named after	Date	Site	Discoverer(s)	Category	Diam.	Ref
521801	2015 TO_{100}	—	September 28, 2009	Mount Lemmon	Mount Lemmon Survey	·	2.6 km	MPC · JPL
521802	2015 TN_{111}	—	October 2, 2006	Mount Lemmon	Mount Lemmon Survey	·	1.4 km	MPC · JPL
521803	2015 TR_{121}	—	December 9, 2010	Mount Lemmon	Mount Lemmon Survey	·	3.2 km	MPC · JPL
521804	2015 TJ_{124}	—	October 8, 2015	Haleakala	Pan-STARRS 1	TEL	980 m	MPC · JPL
521805	2015 TK_{125}	—	December 26, 2011	Mount Lemmon	Mount Lemmon Survey	TEL	1.2 km	MPC · JPL
521806	2015 TZ_{135}	—	March 15, 2007	Mount Lemmon	Mount Lemmon Survey	·	2.2 km	MPC · JPL
521807	2015 TL_{137}	—	May 10, 2014	Mount Lemmon	Mount Lemmon Survey	MAR	780 m	MPC · JPL
521808	2015 TT_{139}	—	October 8, 2015	Haleakala	Pan-STARRS 1	·	2.5 km	MPC · JPL
521809	2015 TF_{140}	—	December 6, 2010	Kitt Peak	Spacewatch	·	2.7 km	MPC · JPL
521810	2015 TM_{141}	—	August 12, 2015	Haleakala	Pan-STARRS 1	·	2.0 km	MPC · JPL
521811	2015 TD_{161}	—	September 27, 2012	Haleakala	Pan-STARRS 1	V	730 m	MPC · JPL
521812	2015 TV_{198}	—	January 2, 2009	Kitt Peak	Spacewatch	NYS	1.1 km	MPC · JPL
521813	2015 TB_{207}	—	June 2, 2014	Haleakala	Pan-STARRS 1	EUN	970 m	MPC · JPL
521814	2015 TG_{215}	—	January 30, 2008	Mount Lemmon	Mount Lemmon Survey	·	1.4 km	MPC · JPL
521815	2015 TB_{233}	—	March 20, 2010	Kitt Peak	Spacewatch	·	1.4 km	MPC · JPL
521816	2015 TE_{235}	—	February 28, 2014	Haleakala	Pan-STARRS 1	·	1.2 km	MPC · JPL
521817	2015 TE_{250}	—	May 25, 2007	Mount Lemmon	Mount Lemmon Survey	·	1.4 km	MPC · JPL
521818	2015 TJ_{259}	—	December 29, 2005	Kitt Peak	Spacewatch	VER	3.1 km	MPC · JPL
521819	2015 TD_{275}	—	May 6, 2008	Mount Lemmon	Mount Lemmon Survey	VER	3.0 km	MPC · JPL
521820	2015 TX_{293}	—	March 28, 2008	Mount Lemmon	Mount Lemmon Survey	·	1.7 km	MPC · JPL
521821	2015 TZ_{298}	—	December 2, 2010	Kitt Peak	Spacewatch	·	3.6 km	MPC · JPL
521822	2015 TK_{320}	—	March 15, 2012	Mount Lemmon	Mount Lemmon Survey	·	2.2 km	MPC · JPL
521823	2015 TT_{327}	—	January 19, 2008	Mount Lemmon	Mount Lemmon Survey	·	1.9 km	MPC · JPL
521824	2015 TR_{345}	—	October 9, 2007	Mount Lemmon	Mount Lemmon Survey	·	1.0 km	MPC · JPL
521825	2015 TJ_{348}	—	September 9, 2015	Haleakala	Pan-STARRS 1	·	950 m	MPC · JPL
521826	2015 TB_{358}	—	February 26, 2012	Mount Lemmon	Mount Lemmon Survey	·	2.7 km	MPC · JPL
521827	2015 TP_{358}	—	March 17, 2009	Kitt Peak	Spacewatch	·	1.1 km	MPC · JPL
521828	2015 TG_{359}	—	April 23, 2007	Mount Lemmon	Mount Lemmon Survey	EOS	1.8 km	MPC · JPL
521829	2015 TH_{360}	—	November 13, 2006	Kitt Peak	Spacewatch	WIT	960 m	MPC · JPL
521830	2015 TL_{364}	—	August 28, 2014	Haleakala	Pan-STARRS 1	·	2.6 km	MPC · JPL
521831	2015 TR_{364}	—	October 26, 2011	Haleakala	Pan-STARRS 1	KON	2.3 km	MPC · JPL
521832	2015 TK_{368}	—	March 13, 2012	Kitt Peak	Spacewatch	·	2.6 km	MPC · JPL
521833	2015 TU_{369}	—	April 10, 2013	Haleakala	Pan-STARRS 1	·	1.5 km	MPC · JPL
521834	2015 TB_{370}	—	January 11, 2008	Mount Lemmon	Mount Lemmon Survey	ADE	1.7 km	MPC · JPL
521835	2015 TS_{370}	—	May 8, 2014	Haleakala	Pan-STARRS 1	·	1.8 km	MPC · JPL
521836	2015 TY_{370}	—	October 13, 2010	Mount Lemmon	Mount Lemmon Survey	EMA	2.6 km	MPC · JPL
521837	2015 TC_{371}	—	November 1, 2010	Kitt Peak	Spacewatch	·	1.5 km	MPC · JPL
521838	2015 TE_{371}	—	January 8, 2011	Mount Lemmon	Mount Lemmon Survey	·	2.1 km	MPC · JPL
521839	2015 TJ_{371}	—	September 10, 2010	La Sagra	OAM	·	1.8 km	MPC · JPL
521840	2015 TM_{371}	—	November 14, 2010	Kitt Peak	Spacewatch	·	1.9 km	MPC · JPL
521841	2015 TQ_{371}	—	April 19, 2007	Kitt Peak	Spacewatch	VER	2.4 km	MPC · JPL
521842	2015 TW_{371}	—	September 23, 2009	Mount Lemmon	Mount Lemmon Survey	·	2.6 km	MPC · JPL
521843	2015 TX_{371}	—	February 23, 2007	Mount Lemmon	Mount Lemmon Survey	·	1.4 km	MPC · JPL
521844	2015 TB_{372}	—	December 5, 2010	Mount Lemmon	Mount Lemmon Survey	EOS	1.5 km	MPC · JPL
521845	2015 TQ_{372}	—	April 15, 2013	Haleakala	Pan-STARRS 1	·	1.1 km	MPC · JPL
521846	2015 TT_{372}	—	September 26, 2006	Kitt Peak	Spacewatch	·	1.5 km	MPC · JPL
521847	2015 TV_{372}	—	January 23, 2011	Mount Lemmon	Mount Lemmon Survey	·	2.1 km	MPC · JPL
521848	2015 TE_{373}	—	January 14, 2011	Mount Lemmon	Mount Lemmon Survey	·	2.7 km	MPC · JPL
521849	2015 TG_{373}	—	February 8, 2013	Haleakala	Pan-STARRS 1	·	1.0 km	MPC · JPL
521850	2015 TJ_{373}	—	July 4, 2014	Haleakala	Pan-STARRS 1	·	1.6 km	MPC · JPL
521851	2015 TL_{373}	—	August 3, 2014	Haleakala	Pan-STARRS 1	·	3.0 km	MPC · JPL
521852	2015 TT_{373}	—	March 10, 2008	Kitt Peak	Spacewatch	EUN	1.0 km	MPC · JPL
521853	2015 TK_{374}	—	February 5, 2011	Mount Lemmon	Mount Lemmon Survey	ELF	2.9 km	MPC · JPL
521854	2015 TO_{374}	—	October 8, 2015	Haleakala	Pan-STARRS 1	·	2.6 km	MPC · JPL
521855	2015 TX_{374}	—	August 26, 2014	Haleakala	Pan-STARRS 1	·	3.1 km	MPC · JPL
521856	2015 TM_{375}	—	January 30, 2006	Kitt Peak	Spacewatch	·	680 m	MPC · JPL
521857	2015 TN_{375}	—	February 3, 2013	Haleakala	Pan-STARRS 1	EUN	1.3 km	MPC · JPL
521858	2015 TW_{375}	—	April 10, 2013	Haleakala	Pan-STARRS 1	AST	1.3 km	MPC · JPL
521859	2015 TM_{376}	—	January 30, 2008	Kitt Peak	Spacewatch	AGN	1.1 km	MPC · JPL
521860	2015 TR_{376}	—	December 2, 2010	Kitt Peak	Spacewatch	·	2.9 km	MPC · JPL
521861	2015 TS_{376}	—	September 24, 2009	Kitt Peak	Spacewatch	·	2.0 km	MPC · JPL
521862	2015 TC_{377}	—	August 4, 2014	Haleakala	Pan-STARRS 1	·	2.2 km	MPC · JPL
521863	2015 TM_{377}	—	March 31, 2012	Kitt Peak	Spacewatch	·	2.6 km	MPC · JPL
521864	2015 TO_{377}	—	March 19, 2010	Mount Lemmon	Mount Lemmon Survey	V	590 m	MPC · JPL
521865	2015 TU_{377}	—	October 8, 2004	Kitt Peak	Spacewatch	·	1.2 km	MPC · JPL
521866	2015 TV_{377}	—	April 22, 2007	Kitt Peak	Spacewatch	·	2.8 km	MPC · JPL
521867	2015 TY_{377}	—	October 23, 2011	Kitt Peak	Spacewatch	·	1.2 km	MPC · JPL
521868	2015 TB_{378}	—	January 30, 2006	Kitt Peak	Spacewatch	·	2.3 km	MPC · JPL
521869	2015 TD_{378}	—	August 28, 2005	Kitt Peak	Spacewatch	KOR	1.2 km	MPC · JPL
521870	2015 TF_{378}	—	October 7, 2004	Kitt Peak	Spacewatch	·	2.6 km	MPC · JPL
521871	2015 TK_{378}	—	August 27, 2009	Kitt Peak	Spacewatch	THM	1.9 km	MPC · JPL
521872	2015 TO_{378}	—	September 15, 2009	Kitt Peak	Spacewatch	·	3.4 km	MPC · JPL
521873	2015 TX_{378}	—	November 30, 2005	Kitt Peak	Spacewatch	·	1.6 km	MPC · JPL
521874	2015 TH_{379}	—	November 10, 2006	Kitt Peak	Spacewatch	PAD	1.4 km	MPC · JPL
521875	2015 TR_{379}	—	October 19, 2011	Kitt Peak	Spacewatch	HNS	1.0 km	MPC · JPL
521876	2015 TS_{379}	—	September 15, 2010	Mount Lemmon	Mount Lemmon Survey	AGN	1.2 km	MPC · JPL
521877	2015 TW_{379}	—	December 1, 2010	Kitt Peak	Spacewatch	·	3.2 km	MPC · JPL
521878	2015 TK_{380}	—	August 28, 2006	Kitt Peak	Spacewatch	EUN	1.1 km	MPC · JPL
521879	2015 TO_{380}	—	October 10, 2015	Haleakala	Pan-STARRS 1	·	1.9 km	MPC · JPL
521880	2015 TS_{380}	—	October 15, 2004	Kitt Peak	Spacewatch	·	2.9 km	MPC · JPL
521881	2015 TX_{380}	—	October 25, 2011	Haleakala	Pan-STARRS 1	EUN	820 m	MPC · JPL
521882	2015 TB_{381}	—	April 26, 2009	Kitt Peak	Spacewatch	·	2.1 km	MPC · JPL
521883	2015 TF_{381}	—	November 1, 2010	Kitt Peak	Spacewatch	EOS	1.7 km	MPC · JPL
521884	2015 TL_{381}	—	May 8, 2013	Haleakala	Pan-STARRS 1	BRA	1.3 km	MPC · JPL
521885	2015 TW_{381}	—	April 6, 2013	Mount Lemmon	Mount Lemmon Survey	·	3.0 km	MPC · JPL
521886	2015 TX_{381}	—	June 7, 2013	Haleakala	Pan-STARRS 1	·	2.8 km	MPC · JPL
521887	2015 TN_{382}	—	April 15, 2013	Haleakala	Pan-STARRS 1	·	2.3 km	MPC · JPL
521888	2015 TP_{382}	—	September 30, 2010	Mount Lemmon	Mount Lemmon Survey	·	1.8 km	MPC · JPL
521889	2015 TU_{382}	—	October 16, 2009	Mount Lemmon	Mount Lemmon Survey	·	2.4 km	MPC · JPL
521890	2015 TA_{383}	—	October 22, 2006	Kitt Peak	Spacewatch	·	1.5 km	MPC · JPL
521891	2015 TF_{383}	—	April 14, 2008	Kitt Peak	Spacewatch	TRE	2.2 km	MPC · JPL
521892	2015 TH_{383}	—	July 26, 2014	Haleakala	Pan-STARRS 1	·	1.7 km	MPC · JPL
521893	2015 TP_{383}	—	October 9, 2010	Mount Lemmon	Mount Lemmon Survey	KOR	960 m	MPC · JPL
521894	2015 TT_{383}	—	October 30, 2010	Mount Lemmon	Mount Lemmon Survey	·	1.4 km	MPC · JPL
521895	2015 TX_{383}	—	January 19, 2012	Haleakala	Pan-STARRS 1	EOS	1.8 km	MPC · JPL
521896	2015 TE_{384}	—	April 8, 2008	Kitt Peak	Spacewatch	·	2.4 km	MPC · JPL
521897	2015 TG_{384}	—	November 2, 2010	Kitt Peak	Spacewatch	·	2.5 km	MPC · JPL
521898	2015 TJ_{384}	—	March 3, 2006	Catalina	CSS	·	3.4 km	MPC · JPL
521899	2015 TN_{384}	—	January 27, 2012	Mount Lemmon	Mount Lemmon Survey	·	1.2 km	MPC · JPL
521900	2015 TY_{384}	—	May 11, 2010	Mount Lemmon	Mount Lemmon Survey	·	840 m	MPC · JPL

== 521901–522000 ==
back to top

Designation			Discovery			Properties		Ref
Permanent	Provisional	Named after	Date	Site	Discoverer(s)	Category	Diam.	Ref
521901	2015 TC_{385}	—	November 15, 2011	Mount Lemmon	Mount Lemmon Survey	·	1.5 km	MPC · JPL
521902	2015 TG_{385}	—	February 1, 2012	Mount Lemmon	Mount Lemmon Survey	·	2.9 km	MPC · JPL
521903	2015 TN_{385}	—	December 6, 2010	Mount Lemmon	Mount Lemmon Survey	·	3.7 km	MPC · JPL
521904	2015 TO_{385}	—	October 26, 2011	Haleakala	Pan-STARRS 1	·	1.2 km	MPC · JPL
521905	2015 TP_{385}	—	February 23, 2012	Catalina	CSS	·	2.8 km	MPC · JPL
521906	2015 TQ_{385}	—	July 30, 2014	Haleakala	Pan-STARRS 1	EOS	1.4 km	MPC · JPL
521907	2015 TZ_{385}	—	November 11, 2006	Kitt Peak	Spacewatch	·	1.6 km	MPC · JPL
521908	2015 TC_{386}	—	October 30, 2010	Mount Lemmon	Mount Lemmon Survey	·	1.8 km	MPC · JPL
521909	2015 TG_{386}	—	June 25, 2014	Mount Lemmon	Mount Lemmon Survey	·	2.4 km	MPC · JPL
521910	2015 TH_{386}	—	March 23, 2013	Mount Lemmon	Mount Lemmon Survey	·	1.7 km	MPC · JPL
521911	2015 UY_{15}	—	October 2, 2006	Mount Lemmon	Mount Lemmon Survey	·	2.0 km	MPC · JPL
521912	2015 UP_{16}	—	March 7, 2014	Kitt Peak	Spacewatch	NYS	1.3 km	MPC · JPL
521913	2015 UZ_{20}	—	February 28, 2014	Haleakala	Pan-STARRS 1	MAS	670 m	MPC · JPL
521914	2015 UN_{44}	—	August 12, 2015	Haleakala	Pan-STARRS 1	·	1.9 km	MPC · JPL
521915	2015 UO_{45}	—	March 5, 2008	Mount Lemmon	Mount Lemmon Survey	·	1.7 km	MPC · JPL
521916	2015 UB_{46}	—	December 22, 2005	Kitt Peak	Spacewatch	·	2.6 km	MPC · JPL
521917	2015 UY_{46}	—	August 28, 2011	La Sagra	OAM	·	960 m	MPC · JPL
521918	2015 UQ_{47}	—	March 24, 2012	Mount Lemmon	Mount Lemmon Survey	EOS	1.4 km	MPC · JPL
521919	2015 US_{50}	—	January 26, 2012	Mount Lemmon	Mount Lemmon Survey	·	1.5 km	MPC · JPL
521920	2015 UK_{71}	—	November 10, 2004	Kitt Peak	Spacewatch	·	1.3 km	MPC · JPL
521921	2015 UU_{75}	—	November 18, 2011	Mount Lemmon	Mount Lemmon Survey	MAR	1.0 km	MPC · JPL
521922	2015 UQ_{83}	—	August 10, 2004	Campo Imperatore	CINEOS	NYS	980 m	MPC · JPL
521923	2015 US_{83}	—	November 20, 2004	Kitt Peak	Spacewatch	·	1.2 km	MPC · JPL
521924	2015 UE_{88}	—	March 2, 2006	Mount Lemmon	Mount Lemmon Survey	·	1.3 km	MPC · JPL
521925	2015 UH_{88}	—	September 15, 2006	Kitt Peak	Spacewatch	·	1.6 km	MPC · JPL
521926	2015 UL_{88}	—	October 3, 2006	Mount Lemmon	Mount Lemmon Survey	·	1.1 km	MPC · JPL
521927	2015 UE_{89}	—	July 1, 2014	Haleakala	Pan-STARRS 1	·	960 m	MPC · JPL
521928	2015 UK_{89}	—	September 12, 2009	Kitt Peak	Spacewatch	·	1.7 km	MPC · JPL
521929	2015 UP_{89}	—	October 26, 2011	Haleakala	Pan-STARRS 1	·	1.3 km	MPC · JPL
521930	2015 UR_{89}	—	September 28, 2006	Kitt Peak	Spacewatch	NEM	1.9 km	MPC · JPL
521931	2015 UA_{90}	—	May 12, 2007	Kitt Peak	Spacewatch	·	2.9 km	MPC · JPL
521932	2015 UC_{90}	—	June 24, 2014	Mount Lemmon	Mount Lemmon Survey	MAR	1.0 km	MPC · JPL
521933	2015 UH_{90}	—	September 13, 2007	Mount Lemmon	Mount Lemmon Survey	CYB	3.5 km	MPC · JPL
521934	2015 UM_{90}	—	January 3, 2012	Mount Lemmon	Mount Lemmon Survey	·	2.8 km	MPC · JPL
521935	2015 UN_{90}	—	September 12, 2005	Kitt Peak	Spacewatch	TIN	1.1 km	MPC · JPL
521936	2015 UR_{90}	—	September 15, 2009	Kitt Peak	Spacewatch	EOS	2.1 km	MPC · JPL
521937	2015 VC	—	September 8, 2004	Socorro	LINEAR	·	1.1 km	MPC · JPL
521938	2015 VT_{1}	—	August 8, 2004	Socorro	LINEAR	·	940 m	MPC · JPL
521939	2015 VQ_{6}	—	June 17, 2006	Kitt Peak	Spacewatch	·	1.2 km	MPC · JPL
521940	2015 VA_{32}	—	January 30, 2012	Haleakala	Pan-STARRS 1	·	3.2 km	MPC · JPL
521941	2015 VN_{38}	—	May 31, 2014	Haleakala	Pan-STARRS 1	·	2.8 km	MPC · JPL
521942	2015 VN_{65}	—	August 15, 2004	Siding Spring	SSS	·	1.0 km	MPC · JPL
521943	2015 VF_{72}	—	December 5, 2010	Mount Lemmon	Mount Lemmon Survey	·	3.0 km	MPC · JPL
521944	2015 VW_{74}	—	June 4, 2014	Haleakala	Pan-STARRS 1	KON	2.8 km	MPC · JPL
521945	2015 VR_{78}	—	May 2, 2003	Kitt Peak	Spacewatch	·	1.2 km	MPC · JPL
521946	2015 VZ_{107}	—	November 5, 2010	Kitt Peak	Spacewatch	·	3.0 km	MPC · JPL
521947	2015 VU_{108}	—	May 8, 2005	Kitt Peak	Spacewatch	EUN	1.4 km	MPC · JPL
521948	2015 VF_{121}	—	April 29, 2008	Kitt Peak	Spacewatch	·	2.3 km	MPC · JPL
521949	2015 VP_{125}	—	December 4, 2007	Kitt Peak	Spacewatch	·	1.8 km	MPC · JPL
521950	2015 VX_{125}	—	November 7, 2007	Catalina	CSS	HNS	1.4 km	MPC · JPL
521951	2015 VR_{136}	—	November 18, 2011	Kitt Peak	Spacewatch	(194)	1.5 km	MPC · JPL
521952	2015 VG_{140}	—	June 3, 2014	Haleakala	Pan-STARRS 1	·	2.0 km	MPC · JPL
521953	2015 VQ_{140}	—	October 10, 2015	Haleakala	Pan-STARRS 1	·	2.7 km	MPC · JPL
521954	2015 VH_{146}	—	May 7, 2010	Kitt Peak	Spacewatch	EUN	990 m	MPC · JPL
521955	2015 VE_{149}	—	October 21, 2015	Haleakala	Pan-STARRS 1	EUN	1.0 km	MPC · JPL
521956	2015 VH_{156}	—	April 24, 2007	Mount Lemmon	Mount Lemmon Survey	·	2.7 km	MPC · JPL
521957	2015 VA_{157}	—	May 28, 2008	Mount Lemmon	Mount Lemmon Survey	·	1.7 km	MPC · JPL
521958	2015 VD_{158}	—	September 14, 2006	Catalina	CSS	(5)	1.6 km	MPC · JPL
521959	2015 VM_{158}	—	December 9, 2010	Kitt Peak	Spacewatch	·	3.3 km	MPC · JPL
521960	2015 VR_{158}	—	February 22, 2012	Siding Spring	SSS	TIR	3.5 km	MPC · JPL
521961	2015 VY_{158}	—	June 13, 2005	Kitt Peak	Spacewatch	·	2.5 km	MPC · JPL
521962	2015 VJ_{159}	—	January 6, 2006	Kitt Peak	Spacewatch	·	1.7 km	MPC · JPL
521963	2015 VM_{159}	—	October 14, 2010	Mount Lemmon	Mount Lemmon Survey	TIR	2.7 km	MPC · JPL
521964	2015 VQ_{159}	—	October 15, 2004	Mount Lemmon	Mount Lemmon Survey	VER	3.8 km	MPC · JPL
521965	2015 VL_{160}	—	February 8, 2011	Mount Lemmon	Mount Lemmon Survey	LIX	3.2 km	MPC · JPL
521966	2015 VO_{160}	—	September 20, 2009	Mount Lemmon	Mount Lemmon Survey	·	1.9 km	MPC · JPL
521967	2015 VY_{160}	—	March 22, 2012	Catalina	CSS	·	3.3 km	MPC · JPL
521968	2015 VG_{161}	—	July 28, 2014	Haleakala	Pan-STARRS 1	·	1.7 km	MPC · JPL
521969	2015 VJ_{161}	—	March 11, 2008	Kitt Peak	Spacewatch	·	1.4 km	MPC · JPL
521970	2015 VM_{161}	—	October 10, 2010	Mount Lemmon	Mount Lemmon Survey	HOF	2.3 km	MPC · JPL
521971	2015 VB_{162}	—	March 13, 2007	Mount Lemmon	Mount Lemmon Survey	·	2.6 km	MPC · JPL
521972	2015 VE_{162}	—	November 8, 2015	Mount Lemmon	Mount Lemmon Survey	·	3.0 km	MPC · JPL
521973	2015 VH_{162}	—	September 24, 2009	Kitt Peak	Spacewatch	·	2.6 km	MPC · JPL
521974	2015 VK_{162}	—	July 4, 2014	Haleakala	Pan-STARRS 1	·	2.9 km	MPC · JPL
521975	2015 VQ_{162}	—	May 3, 2005	Kitt Peak	Spacewatch	·	1.9 km	MPC · JPL
521976	2015 VX_{162}	—	November 23, 2008	Kitt Peak	Spacewatch	V	600 m	MPC · JPL
521977	2015 VB_{163}	—	September 30, 2006	Mount Lemmon	Mount Lemmon Survey	·	1.3 km	MPC · JPL
521978	2015 VE_{163}	—	May 8, 2013	Haleakala	Pan-STARRS 1	EOS	1.9 km	MPC · JPL
521979	2015 VR_{163}	—	February 27, 2012	Haleakala	Pan-STARRS 1	·	2.3 km	MPC · JPL
521980	2015 VX_{163}	—	January 2, 2012	Mount Lemmon	Mount Lemmon Survey	·	1.9 km	MPC · JPL
521981	2015 WE_{16}	—	June 18, 2013	Haleakala	Pan-STARRS 1	·	3.3 km	MPC · JPL
521982	2015 WE_{19}	—	December 9, 2010	Kitt Peak	Spacewatch	·	3.4 km	MPC · JPL
521983	2015 WP_{19}	—	April 11, 2003	Kitt Peak	Spacewatch	·	1.5 km	MPC · JPL
521984	2015 WQ_{19}	—	October 30, 2010	Mount Lemmon	Mount Lemmon Survey	·	1.6 km	MPC · JPL
521985	2015 WZ_{19}	—	December 16, 2007	Kitt Peak	Spacewatch	EUN	1.3 km	MPC · JPL
521986	2015 WB_{20}	—	November 25, 2011	Haleakala	Pan-STARRS 1	·	1.3 km	MPC · JPL
521987	2015 WU_{20}	—	August 20, 2014	Haleakala	Pan-STARRS 1	·	2.9 km	MPC · JPL
521988	2015 WW_{20}	—	April 30, 2005	Kitt Peak	Spacewatch	·	1.7 km	MPC · JPL
521989	2015 WX_{20}	—	June 8, 2013	Mount Lemmon	Mount Lemmon Survey	EOS	1.9 km	MPC · JPL
521990	2015 WZ_{20}	—	January 23, 2011	Mount Lemmon	Mount Lemmon Survey	·	2.3 km	MPC · JPL
521991	2015 WB_{21}	—	December 27, 2006	Mount Lemmon	Mount Lemmon Survey	AEO	940 m	MPC · JPL
521992	2015 WH_{21}	—	February 25, 2012	Mayhill	L. Elenin	·	1.5 km	MPC · JPL
521993	2015 WS_{21}	—	August 31, 2011	Haleakala	Pan-STARRS 1	V	540 m	MPC · JPL
521994	2015 WY_{21}	—	May 4, 2005	Kitt Peak	Spacewatch	EUN	1.2 km	MPC · JPL
521995	2015 WK_{22}	—	March 31, 2008	Kitt Peak	Spacewatch	·	2.0 km	MPC · JPL
521996	2015 XR_{17}	—	September 9, 2015	Haleakala	Pan-STARRS 1	EOS	1.7 km	MPC · JPL
521997	2015 XC_{28}	—	July 12, 2005	Mount Lemmon	Mount Lemmon Survey	·	1.8 km	MPC · JPL
521998	2015 XJ_{63}	—	November 6, 2010	Mount Lemmon	Mount Lemmon Survey	·	2.0 km	MPC · JPL
521999	2015 XQ_{67}	—	January 4, 2011	Mount Lemmon	Mount Lemmon Survey	VER	2.0 km	MPC · JPL
522000	2015 XH_{76}	—	December 6, 2010	Mount Lemmon	Mount Lemmon Survey	EOS	1.8 km	MPC · JPL

back to top
