= List of minor planets: 502001–503000 =

The following is a partial list of minor planets, running from minor-planet number 502001 through 503000, inclusive. The primary data for this and other partial lists is based on JPL's "Small-Body Orbital Elements" and data available from the Minor Planet Center. Critical list information is also provided by the MPC, unless otherwise specified from Lowell Observatory. A detailed description of the table's columns and additional sources are given on the main page including a complete list of every page in this series, and a statistical break-up on the dynamical classification of minor planets.

Also see the summary list of all named bodies in numerical and alphabetical order, and the corresponding naming citations for the number range of this particular list. New namings may only be added to this list after official publication, as the preannouncement of names is condemned by the Working Group for Small Bodies Nomenclature of the International Astronomical Union.

Near-Earth obj.	MBA (inner)	MBA (outer)	Centaur
Mars-crosser	MBA (middle)	Jupiter trojan	Trans-Neptunian obj.
Unclassified

== 502001–502100 ==
Designation			Discovery			Properties		Ref
Permanent	Provisional	Named after	Date	Site	Discoverer(s)	Category	Diam.	Ref
502001	2015 AR_{35}	—	April 27, 2011	Haleakala	Pan-STARRS 1	·	3.1 km	MPC · JPL
502002	2015 AA_{36}	—	August 28, 2013	Mount Lemmon	Mount Lemmon Survey	·	1.2 km	MPC · JPL
502003	2015 AB_{37}	—	March 8, 2005	Kitt Peak	Spacewatch	·	2.0 km	MPC · JPL
502004	2015 AB_{38}	—	January 5, 2000	Kitt Peak	Spacewatch	·	1.2 km	MPC · JPL
502005	2015 AW_{39}	—	April 21, 2004	Kitt Peak	Spacewatch	NYS	1.2 km	MPC · JPL
502006	2015 AK_{41}	—	August 18, 2006	Kitt Peak	Spacewatch	MAS	620 m	MPC · JPL
502007	2015 AL_{43}	—	February 12, 1999	Kitt Peak	Spacewatch	·	1.5 km	MPC · JPL
502008	2015 AH_{53}	—	August 15, 2013	Haleakala	Pan-STARRS 1	·	930 m	MPC · JPL
502009	2015 AO_{55}	—	December 1, 2005	Kitt Peak	Spacewatch	·	1.4 km	MPC · JPL
502010	2015 AK_{56}	—	January 22, 2006	Mount Lemmon	Mount Lemmon Survey	·	2.0 km	MPC · JPL
502011	2015 AF_{57}	—	January 12, 2011	Mount Lemmon	Mount Lemmon Survey	(5)	830 m	MPC · JPL
502012	2015 AE_{62}	—	March 2, 2011	Mount Lemmon	Mount Lemmon Survey	NEM	1.8 km	MPC · JPL
502013	2015 AS_{67}	—	January 12, 2010	Kitt Peak	Spacewatch	·	2.4 km	MPC · JPL
502014	2015 AV_{68}	—	December 15, 2014	Kitt Peak	Spacewatch	·	2.2 km	MPC · JPL
502015	2015 AL_{70}	—	November 26, 2014	Haleakala	Pan-STARRS 1	·	1.9 km	MPC · JPL
502016	2015 AN_{73}	—	January 30, 2011	Mount Lemmon	Mount Lemmon Survey	·	1.8 km	MPC · JPL
502017	2015 AR_{74}	—	December 25, 2005	Kitt Peak	Spacewatch	·	1.5 km	MPC · JPL
502018	2015 AZ_{75}	—	August 27, 2013	Haleakala	Pan-STARRS 1	·	1.0 km	MPC · JPL
502019	2015 AY_{77}	—	December 13, 2010	Mount Lemmon	Mount Lemmon Survey	·	1.3 km	MPC · JPL
502020	2015 AZ_{80}	—	December 12, 2010	Mount Lemmon	Mount Lemmon Survey	·	1.3 km	MPC · JPL
502021	2015 AW_{81}	—	November 8, 2009	Mount Lemmon	Mount Lemmon Survey	·	1.3 km	MPC · JPL
502022	2015 AW_{83}	—	October 5, 2013	Mount Lemmon	Mount Lemmon Survey	·	1.2 km	MPC · JPL
502023	2015 AP_{84}	—	February 28, 2008	Mount Lemmon	Mount Lemmon Survey	·	770 m	MPC · JPL
502024	2015 AR_{87}	—	April 27, 2012	Haleakala	Pan-STARRS 1	·	1.5 km	MPC · JPL
502025	2015 AC_{96}	—	April 24, 2010	WISE	WISE	·	3.6 km	MPC · JPL
502026	2015 AW_{96}	—	January 28, 2011	Mount Lemmon	Mount Lemmon Survey	HNS	1.1 km	MPC · JPL
502027	2015 AK_{99}	—	December 21, 2014	Mount Lemmon	Mount Lemmon Survey	·	1.5 km	MPC · JPL
502028	2015 AK_{100}	—	August 22, 2012	Haleakala	Pan-STARRS 1	HYG	2.7 km	MPC · JPL
502029	2015 AO_{102}	—	December 17, 2009	Mount Lemmon	Mount Lemmon Survey	·	1.9 km	MPC · JPL
502030	2015 AD_{105}	—	January 22, 2006	Mount Lemmon	Mount Lemmon Survey	·	2.2 km	MPC · JPL
502031	2015 AM_{112}	—	April 2, 2006	Kitt Peak	Spacewatch	KOR	1.5 km	MPC · JPL
502032	2015 AA_{118}	—	November 9, 2009	Mount Lemmon	Mount Lemmon Survey	·	1.9 km	MPC · JPL
502033	2015 AR_{125}	—	January 5, 2006	Kitt Peak	Spacewatch	·	1.4 km	MPC · JPL
502034	2015 AP_{126}	—	September 4, 2010	Mount Lemmon	Mount Lemmon Survey	·	590 m	MPC · JPL
502035	2015 AM_{128}	—	May 15, 2012	Haleakala	Pan-STARRS 1	·	1.4 km	MPC · JPL
502036	2015 AR_{128}	—	March 2, 2006	Kitt Peak	Spacewatch	KOR	1.2 km	MPC · JPL
502037	2015 AH_{129}	—	November 17, 2009	Mount Lemmon	Mount Lemmon Survey	·	1.1 km	MPC · JPL
502038	2015 AO_{130}	—	February 25, 2011	Mount Lemmon	Mount Lemmon Survey	·	1.5 km	MPC · JPL
502039	2015 AN_{132}	—	August 10, 2012	Kitt Peak	Spacewatch	·	3.0 km	MPC · JPL
502040	2015 AS_{133}	—	January 7, 2006	Mount Lemmon	Mount Lemmon Survey	·	1.6 km	MPC · JPL
502041	2015 AF_{142}	—	December 29, 2005	Kitt Peak	Spacewatch	·	1.8 km	MPC · JPL
502042	2015 AM_{142}	—	January 8, 2006	Mount Lemmon	Mount Lemmon Survey	·	1.6 km	MPC · JPL
502043	2015 AD_{146}	—	January 25, 2007	Kitt Peak	Spacewatch	·	1.0 km	MPC · JPL
502044	2015 AX_{146}	—	September 20, 2003	Kitt Peak	Spacewatch	·	720 m	MPC · JPL
502045	2015 AY_{149}	—	September 15, 2004	Kitt Peak	Spacewatch	·	1.7 km	MPC · JPL
502046	2015 AX_{150}	—	December 5, 2005	Mount Lemmon	Mount Lemmon Survey	·	1.8 km	MPC · JPL
502047	2015 AH_{152}	—	January 27, 2007	Kitt Peak	Spacewatch	·	1.2 km	MPC · JPL
502048	2015 AR_{154}	—	January 15, 2004	Kitt Peak	Spacewatch	·	4.6 km	MPC · JPL
502049	2015 AT_{154}	—	February 7, 2011	Mount Lemmon	Mount Lemmon Survey	·	1.1 km	MPC · JPL
502050	2015 AH_{158}	—	February 11, 2011	Mount Lemmon	Mount Lemmon Survey	·	1.1 km	MPC · JPL
502051	2015 AK_{158}	—	September 26, 2006	Catalina	CSS	·	990 m	MPC · JPL
502052	2015 AZ_{158}	—	November 7, 2010	Mount Lemmon	Mount Lemmon Survey	·	1.2 km	MPC · JPL
502053	2015 AP_{164}	—	October 24, 2013	Mount Lemmon	Mount Lemmon Survey	KOR	1.3 km	MPC · JPL
502054	2015 AX_{164}	—	April 1, 2011	Kitt Peak	Spacewatch	·	1.9 km	MPC · JPL
502055	2015 AC_{166}	—	June 16, 2012	Mount Lemmon	Mount Lemmon Survey	·	1.8 km	MPC · JPL
502056	2015 AW_{166}	—	November 24, 2006	Kitt Peak	Spacewatch	·	1.1 km	MPC · JPL
502057	2015 AK_{168}	—	April 11, 2003	Kitt Peak	Spacewatch	·	1.3 km	MPC · JPL
502058	2015 AU_{168}	—	September 26, 2006	Catalina	CSS	·	1.3 km	MPC · JPL
502059	2015 AZ_{170}	—	April 5, 2011	Mount Lemmon	Mount Lemmon Survey	·	1.7 km	MPC · JPL
502060	2015 AB_{172}	—	January 11, 2011	Kitt Peak	Spacewatch	·	1.1 km	MPC · JPL
502061	2015 AC_{176}	—	November 26, 2005	Mount Lemmon	Mount Lemmon Survey	·	1.2 km	MPC · JPL
502062	2015 AD_{179}	—	December 26, 2005	Kitt Peak	Spacewatch	·	1.3 km	MPC · JPL
502063	2015 AG_{179}	—	June 16, 2010	WISE	WISE	(895)	3.3 km	MPC · JPL
502064	2015 AH_{180}	—	October 13, 2013	Mount Lemmon	Mount Lemmon Survey	·	1.9 km	MPC · JPL
502065	2015 AO_{180}	—	October 16, 2009	Mount Lemmon	Mount Lemmon Survey	·	920 m	MPC · JPL
502066	2015 AM_{181}	—	January 1, 2008	Kitt Peak	Spacewatch	·	490 m	MPC · JPL
502067	2015 AE_{182}	—	April 25, 2003	Kitt Peak	Spacewatch	·	1.2 km	MPC · JPL
502068	2015 AL_{183}	—	December 21, 2014	Haleakala	Pan-STARRS 1	·	2.0 km	MPC · JPL
502069	2015 AZ_{188}	—	January 14, 2015	Haleakala	Pan-STARRS 1	·	1.8 km	MPC · JPL
502070	2015 AB_{189}	—	January 14, 2011	Kitt Peak	Spacewatch	·	1.2 km	MPC · JPL
502071	2015 AK_{191}	—	August 15, 2013	Haleakala	Pan-STARRS 1	·	1.1 km	MPC · JPL
502072	2015 AM_{193}	—	February 25, 2011	Mount Lemmon	Mount Lemmon Survey	·	1.1 km	MPC · JPL
502073	2015 AL_{196}	—	November 10, 1999	Kitt Peak	Spacewatch	MAS	510 m	MPC · JPL
502074	2015 AN_{196}	—	November 11, 2013	Mount Lemmon	Mount Lemmon Survey	·	2.3 km	MPC · JPL
502075	2015 AA_{206}	—	September 16, 2006	Kitt Peak	Spacewatch	TIR	2.1 km	MPC · JPL
502076	2015 AF_{206}	—	October 15, 1999	Kitt Peak	Spacewatch	·	1.0 km	MPC · JPL
502077	2015 AD_{225}	—	March 5, 2011	Mount Lemmon	Mount Lemmon Survey	·	1.4 km	MPC · JPL
502078	2015 AS_{228}	—	September 11, 2004	Kitt Peak	Spacewatch	·	2.1 km	MPC · JPL
502079	2015 AR_{229}	—	October 4, 2006	Mount Lemmon	Mount Lemmon Survey	·	1.3 km	MPC · JPL
502080	2015 AT_{232}	—	January 15, 2010	Mount Lemmon	Mount Lemmon Survey	GAL	1.6 km	MPC · JPL
502081	2015 AB_{233}	—	November 23, 2000	Kitt Peak	Spacewatch	·	2.0 km	MPC · JPL
502082	2015 AX_{233}	—	January 15, 2015	Haleakala	Pan-STARRS 1	·	2.3 km	MPC · JPL
502083	2015 AQ_{234}	—	November 28, 2014	Haleakala	Pan-STARRS 1	MAR	930 m	MPC · JPL
502084	2015 AO_{238}	—	October 6, 2008	Kitt Peak	Spacewatch	·	1.7 km	MPC · JPL
502085	2015 AW_{238}	—	June 16, 2010	WISE	WISE	·	4.1 km	MPC · JPL
502086	2015 AT_{239}	—	November 17, 2006	Kitt Peak	Spacewatch	NYS	1.1 km	MPC · JPL
502087	2015 AB_{240}	—	August 17, 2009	Kitt Peak	Spacewatch	·	1.2 km	MPC · JPL
502088	2015 AD_{240}	—	April 16, 2007	Mount Lemmon	Mount Lemmon Survey	·	1.0 km	MPC · JPL
502089	2015 AJ_{241}	—	December 21, 2008	Catalina	CSS	·	2.9 km	MPC · JPL
502090	2015 AM_{241}	—	April 8, 2002	Cerro Tololo	Deep Ecliptic Survey	·	2.2 km	MPC · JPL
502091	2015 AT_{246}	—	February 22, 1998	Kitt Peak	Spacewatch	·	1.6 km	MPC · JPL
502092	2015 AH_{248}	—	March 6, 2011	Mount Lemmon	Mount Lemmon Survey	·	1.5 km	MPC · JPL
502093	2015 AC_{250}	—	March 14, 2007	Kitt Peak	Spacewatch	EUN	1.2 km	MPC · JPL
502094	2015 AB_{252}	—	May 2, 2006	Mount Lemmon	Mount Lemmon Survey	EOS	1.5 km	MPC · JPL
502095	2015 AL_{252}	—	October 22, 2003	Kitt Peak	Spacewatch	·	760 m	MPC · JPL
502096	2015 AQ_{253}	—	April 12, 2011	Mount Lemmon	Mount Lemmon Survey	·	1.5 km	MPC · JPL
502097	2015 AT_{258}	—	December 7, 2005	Kitt Peak	Spacewatch	·	2.7 km	MPC · JPL
502098	2015 AV_{261}	—	August 15, 2013	Haleakala	Pan-STARRS 1	V	540 m	MPC · JPL
502099	2015 AB_{262}	—	August 15, 2013	Haleakala	Pan-STARRS 1	·	1.3 km	MPC · JPL
502100	2015 AE_{263}	—	December 11, 2009	Catalina	CSS	·	2.3 km	MPC · JPL

== 502101–502200 ==
back to top

Designation			Discovery			Properties		Ref
Permanent	Provisional	Named after	Date	Site	Discoverer(s)	Category	Diam.	Ref
502101	2015 AE_{264}	—	January 15, 2015	Haleakala	Pan-STARRS 1	·	2.8 km	MPC · JPL
502102	2015 AF_{264}	—	August 28, 2005	Kitt Peak	Spacewatch	H	480 m	MPC · JPL
502103	2015 AN_{264}	—	November 4, 2004	Catalina	CSS	·	2.1 km	MPC · JPL
502104	2015 AA_{265}	—	May 16, 2012	Haleakala	Pan-STARRS 1	PHO	980 m	MPC · JPL
502105	2015 AQ_{272}	—	November 5, 2005	Kitt Peak	Spacewatch	3:2	5.9 km	MPC · JPL
502106	2015 AX_{273}	—	April 4, 2011	Mount Lemmon	Mount Lemmon Survey	·	1.7 km	MPC · JPL
502107	2015 AU_{278}	—	August 14, 2006	Siding Spring	SSS	·	4.8 km	MPC · JPL
502108	2015 AZ_{279}	—	August 25, 2004	Kitt Peak	Spacewatch	HNS	860 m	MPC · JPL
502109	2015 AP_{280}	—	August 23, 2007	Kitt Peak	Spacewatch	·	1.9 km	MPC · JPL
502110	2015 BR	—	January 24, 2011	Mount Lemmon	Mount Lemmon Survey	·	1.3 km	MPC · JPL
502111	2015 BS_{2}	—	September 23, 2008	Mount Lemmon	Mount Lemmon Survey	KOR	1.5 km	MPC · JPL
502112	2015 BT_{3}	—	January 2, 2011	La Sagra	OAM	·	1.6 km	MPC · JPL
502113	2015 BB_{5}	—	November 29, 2014	Haleakala	Pan-STARRS 1	·	2.4 km	MPC · JPL
502114	2015 BG_{5}	—	October 11, 2005	Anderson Mesa	LONEOS	·	1.3 km	MPC · JPL
502115	2015 BZ_{5}	—	February 9, 2008	Mount Lemmon	Mount Lemmon Survey	·	1.0 km	MPC · JPL
502116	2015 BC_{6}	—	January 2, 2011	Mount Lemmon	Mount Lemmon Survey	·	1.5 km	MPC · JPL
502117	2015 BS_{6}	—	March 16, 2007	Kitt Peak	Spacewatch	·	1.1 km	MPC · JPL
502118	2015 BR_{7}	—	November 21, 2009	Mount Lemmon	Mount Lemmon Survey	·	2.1 km	MPC · JPL
502119	2015 BS_{7}	—	February 23, 2007	Kitt Peak	Spacewatch	·	1.2 km	MPC · JPL
502120	2015 BT_{7}	—	March 5, 2008	Mount Lemmon	Mount Lemmon Survey	·	1.3 km	MPC · JPL
502121	2015 BK_{8}	—	September 16, 2003	Kitt Peak	Spacewatch	·	710 m	MPC · JPL
502122	2015 BT_{8}	—	November 1, 2008	Mount Lemmon	Mount Lemmon Survey	·	1.7 km	MPC · JPL
502123	2015 BC_{13}	—	October 2, 2008	Kitt Peak	Spacewatch	KOR	1.4 km	MPC · JPL
502124	2015 BG_{13}	—	May 26, 2010	WISE	WISE	EOS	3.7 km	MPC · JPL
502125	2015 BN_{15}	—	February 4, 2000	Kitt Peak	Spacewatch	KOR	1.6 km	MPC · JPL
502126	2015 BA_{16}	—	March 13, 2005	Kitt Peak	Spacewatch	·	2.8 km	MPC · JPL
502127	2015 BO_{16}	—	February 1, 2006	Mount Lemmon	Mount Lemmon Survey	·	2.1 km	MPC · JPL
502128	2015 BR_{16}	—	May 15, 2010	WISE	WISE	·	2.7 km	MPC · JPL
502129	2015 BC_{18}	—	November 30, 2005	Mount Lemmon	Mount Lemmon Survey	·	1.2 km	MPC · JPL
502130	2015 BA_{19}	—	March 14, 2007	Kitt Peak	Spacewatch	·	1.3 km	MPC · JPL
502131	2015 BB_{20}	—	April 15, 2010	Mount Lemmon	Mount Lemmon Survey	·	2.5 km	MPC · JPL
502132	2015 BP_{21}	—	September 28, 2000	Kitt Peak	Spacewatch	·	1.4 km	MPC · JPL
502133	2015 BU_{22}	—	February 1, 2008	Mount Lemmon	Mount Lemmon Survey	V	580 m	MPC · JPL
502134	2015 BZ_{22}	—	September 7, 2004	Socorro	LINEAR	·	1.8 km	MPC · JPL
502135	2015 BX_{23}	—	September 6, 2008	Mount Lemmon	Mount Lemmon Survey	·	3.8 km	MPC · JPL
502136	2015 BT_{24}	—	January 16, 2015	Haleakala	Pan-STARRS 1	EOS	1.8 km	MPC · JPL
502137	2015 BA_{25}	—	January 5, 2006	Mount Lemmon	Mount Lemmon Survey	·	1.6 km	MPC · JPL
502138	2015 BL_{25}	—	November 29, 2005	Mount Lemmon	Mount Lemmon Survey	(5)	1.2 km	MPC · JPL
502139	2015 BC_{26}	—	December 30, 2008	Mount Lemmon	Mount Lemmon Survey	·	2.5 km	MPC · JPL
502140	2015 BG_{26}	—	September 14, 2013	Haleakala	Pan-STARRS 1	·	1.4 km	MPC · JPL
502141	2015 BN_{26}	—	December 6, 2008	Kitt Peak	Spacewatch	·	1.9 km	MPC · JPL
502142	2015 BU_{26}	—	March 5, 2002	Kitt Peak	Spacewatch	·	1.4 km	MPC · JPL
502143	2015 BQ_{27}	—	February 27, 2006	Kitt Peak	Spacewatch	·	2.0 km	MPC · JPL
502144	2015 BC_{28}	—	December 24, 2006	Kitt Peak	Spacewatch	V	780 m	MPC · JPL
502145	2015 BH_{28}	—	November 20, 2007	Mount Lemmon	Mount Lemmon Survey	·	3.0 km	MPC · JPL
502146	2015 BJ_{30}	—	March 18, 2010	Mount Lemmon	Mount Lemmon Survey	·	2.4 km	MPC · JPL
502147	2015 BY_{31}	—	May 26, 2010	WISE	WISE	·	4.3 km	MPC · JPL
502148	2015 BK_{34}	—	December 30, 2005	Kitt Peak	Spacewatch	·	1.8 km	MPC · JPL
502149	2015 BL_{34}	—	December 29, 2003	Kitt Peak	Spacewatch	·	1.1 km	MPC · JPL
502150	2015 BO_{34}	—	June 4, 2011	Mount Lemmon	Mount Lemmon Survey	·	3.0 km	MPC · JPL
502151	2015 BQ_{34}	—	March 3, 1997	Kitt Peak	Spacewatch	·	1.6 km	MPC · JPL
502152	2015 BS_{34}	—	February 11, 2004	Kitt Peak	Spacewatch	MAS	480 m	MPC · JPL
502153	2015 BJ_{36}	—	December 18, 2007	Kitt Peak	Spacewatch	·	5.6 km	MPC · JPL
502154	2015 BW_{36}	—	December 31, 2008	Kitt Peak	Spacewatch	·	2.9 km	MPC · JPL
502155	2015 BH_{38}	—	August 29, 2013	Haleakala	Pan-STARRS 1	·	1.4 km	MPC · JPL
502156	2015 BO_{41}	—	March 15, 2007	Kitt Peak	Spacewatch	·	1.8 km	MPC · JPL
502157	2015 BQ_{41}	—	May 5, 2008	Mount Lemmon	Mount Lemmon Survey	·	1.0 km	MPC · JPL
502158	2015 BH_{42}	—	April 7, 2007	Mount Lemmon	Mount Lemmon Survey	·	1.5 km	MPC · JPL
502159	2015 BP_{45}	—	February 28, 2012	Haleakala	Pan-STARRS 1	·	710 m	MPC · JPL
502160	2015 BW_{48}	—	February 10, 2008	Kitt Peak	Spacewatch	·	1.5 km	MPC · JPL
502161	2015 BV_{53}	—	January 29, 2004	Kitt Peak	Spacewatch	·	920 m	MPC · JPL
502162	2015 BQ_{57}	—	December 10, 2005	Kitt Peak	Spacewatch	·	1.4 km	MPC · JPL
502163	2015 BK_{58}	—	November 1, 2013	Mount Lemmon	Mount Lemmon Survey	·	1.3 km	MPC · JPL
502164	2015 BQ_{58}	—	January 7, 2006	Kitt Peak	Spacewatch	·	1.6 km	MPC · JPL
502165	2015 BY_{58}	—	December 29, 2003	Kitt Peak	Spacewatch	NYS	690 m	MPC · JPL
502166	2015 BZ_{58}	—	December 17, 2003	Kitt Peak	Spacewatch	·	950 m	MPC · JPL
502167	2015 BA_{59}	—	September 30, 2006	Kitt Peak	Spacewatch	MAS	560 m	MPC · JPL
502168	2015 BE_{59}	—	November 3, 2007	Mount Lemmon	Mount Lemmon Survey	URS	3.1 km	MPC · JPL
502169	2015 BN_{59}	—	February 8, 2011	Mount Lemmon	Mount Lemmon Survey	·	1.0 km	MPC · JPL
502170	2015 BP_{59}	—	January 23, 2006	Kitt Peak	Spacewatch	·	2.1 km	MPC · JPL
502171	2015 BR_{59}	—	June 24, 2010	WISE	WISE	·	2.7 km	MPC · JPL
502172	2015 BZ_{59}	—	December 10, 2010	Kitt Peak	Spacewatch	MAS	710 m	MPC · JPL
502173	2015 BB_{60}	—	March 12, 2010	Kitt Peak	Spacewatch	THM	2.2 km	MPC · JPL
502174	2015 BH_{60}	—	February 3, 2008	Kitt Peak	Spacewatch	·	1.1 km	MPC · JPL
502175	2015 BE_{61}	—	January 18, 2004	Kitt Peak	Spacewatch	·	1.5 km	MPC · JPL
502176	2015 BG_{61}	—	August 10, 2007	Kitt Peak	Spacewatch	·	2.3 km	MPC · JPL
502177	2015 BK_{61}	—	October 27, 2009	Catalina	CSS	·	2.1 km	MPC · JPL
502178	2015 BS_{61}	—	November 11, 2010	Mount Lemmon	Mount Lemmon Survey	·	1.1 km	MPC · JPL
502179	2015 BU_{63}	—	January 17, 2015	Haleakala	Pan-STARRS 1	·	2.7 km	MPC · JPL
502180	2015 BV_{63}	—	March 4, 2005	Kitt Peak	Spacewatch	EOS	1.8 km	MPC · JPL
502181	2015 BG_{64}	—	October 3, 1999	Kitt Peak	Spacewatch	·	1.9 km	MPC · JPL
502182	2015 BA_{65}	—	February 16, 2004	Kitt Peak	Spacewatch	·	3.2 km	MPC · JPL
502183	2015 BG_{65}	—	January 14, 2010	Kitt Peak	Spacewatch	HOF	3.1 km	MPC · JPL
502184	2015 BH_{65}	—	September 12, 1994	Kitt Peak	Spacewatch	·	1.3 km	MPC · JPL
502185	2015 BK_{66}	—	September 21, 2008	Mount Lemmon	Mount Lemmon Survey	·	1.9 km	MPC · JPL
502186	2015 BO_{66}	—	October 5, 2013	Kitt Peak	Spacewatch	KOR	1.2 km	MPC · JPL
502187	2015 BS_{66}	—	December 22, 2008	Kitt Peak	Spacewatch	·	3.1 km	MPC · JPL
502188	2015 BT_{66}	—	December 21, 2008	Mount Lemmon	Mount Lemmon Survey	·	2.9 km	MPC · JPL
502189	2015 BB_{67}	—	April 6, 2010	Kitt Peak	Spacewatch	VER	3.3 km	MPC · JPL
502190	2015 BY_{67}	—	April 1, 2008	Mount Lemmon	Mount Lemmon Survey	·	1.0 km	MPC · JPL
502191	2015 BA_{68}	—	November 30, 2008	Kitt Peak	Spacewatch	THM	2.7 km	MPC · JPL
502192	2015 BG_{69}	—	November 18, 2008	Kitt Peak	Spacewatch	EOS	2.0 km	MPC · JPL
502193	2015 BQ_{69}	—	September 7, 2004	Kitt Peak	Spacewatch	·	1.6 km	MPC · JPL
502194	2015 BV_{69}	—	November 26, 2009	Mount Lemmon	Mount Lemmon Survey	·	1.6 km	MPC · JPL
502195	2015 BY_{69}	—	October 1, 2008	Mount Lemmon	Mount Lemmon Survey	·	1.8 km	MPC · JPL
502196	2015 BZ_{69}	—	December 7, 2005	Kitt Peak	Spacewatch	·	1.5 km	MPC · JPL
502197	2015 BG_{70}	—	November 22, 2009	Mount Lemmon	Mount Lemmon Survey	·	1.3 km	MPC · JPL
502198	2015 BV_{71}	—	December 29, 2008	Kitt Peak	Spacewatch	HYG	2.6 km	MPC · JPL
502199	2015 BW_{71}	—	April 13, 2011	Mount Lemmon	Mount Lemmon Survey	·	1.8 km	MPC · JPL
502200	2015 BY_{71}	—	September 5, 2008	Kitt Peak	Spacewatch	HOF	2.8 km	MPC · JPL

== 502201–502300 ==
back to top

Designation			Discovery			Properties		Ref
Permanent	Provisional	Named after	Date	Site	Discoverer(s)	Category	Diam.	Ref
502201	2015 BQ_{72}	—	August 20, 2004	Kitt Peak	Spacewatch	·	1.6 km	MPC · JPL
502202	2015 BE_{73}	—	September 14, 2013	Haleakala	Pan-STARRS 1	·	1.9 km	MPC · JPL
502203	2015 BB_{74}	—	January 26, 2006	Mount Lemmon	Mount Lemmon Survey	·	1.8 km	MPC · JPL
502204	2015 BK_{74}	—	June 1, 2010	WISE	WISE	·	2.2 km	MPC · JPL
502205	2015 BW_{74}	—	February 11, 2002	Kitt Peak	Spacewatch	·	1.5 km	MPC · JPL
502206	2015 BY_{74}	—	January 31, 2006	Kitt Peak	Spacewatch	AGN	880 m	MPC · JPL
502207	2015 BZ_{75}	—	August 29, 2013	Haleakala	Pan-STARRS 1	·	1.8 km	MPC · JPL
502208	2015 BA_{76}	—	February 16, 2010	Kitt Peak	Spacewatch	·	3.0 km	MPC · JPL
502209	2015 BN_{77}	—	October 13, 2013	Mount Lemmon	Mount Lemmon Survey	AGN	1 km	MPC · JPL
502210	2015 BO_{77}	—	April 10, 2005	Mount Lemmon	Mount Lemmon Survey	·	2.5 km	MPC · JPL
502211	2015 BG_{78}	—	June 17, 2010	WISE	WISE	·	3.1 km	MPC · JPL
502212	2015 BY_{78}	—	March 4, 2005	Mount Lemmon	Mount Lemmon Survey	·	480 m	MPC · JPL
502213	2015 BP_{80}	—	October 2, 2006	Catalina	CSS	V	640 m	MPC · JPL
502214	2015 BF_{81}	—	November 13, 2006	Catalina	CSS	·	1.4 km	MPC · JPL
502215	2015 BW_{82}	—	February 10, 2010	WISE	WISE	·	4.2 km	MPC · JPL
502216	2015 BX_{85}	—	October 16, 2006	Catalina	CSS	·	1.0 km	MPC · JPL
502217	2015 BF_{86}	—	January 8, 2002	Kitt Peak	Spacewatch	·	1.5 km	MPC · JPL
502218	2015 BZ_{86}	—	November 9, 2009	Mount Lemmon	Mount Lemmon Survey	·	1.3 km	MPC · JPL
502219	2015 BA_{87}	—	December 21, 2014	Mount Lemmon	Mount Lemmon Survey	·	3.8 km	MPC · JPL
502220	2015 BW_{87}	—	November 6, 2005	Mount Lemmon	Mount Lemmon Survey	·	1.0 km	MPC · JPL
502221	2015 BB_{88}	—	April 2, 2005	Mount Lemmon	Mount Lemmon Survey	·	2.3 km	MPC · JPL
502222	2015 BD_{88}	—	December 22, 2008	Kitt Peak	Spacewatch	·	2.9 km	MPC · JPL
502223	2015 BH_{88}	—	December 20, 2009	Kitt Peak	Spacewatch	AGN	1.0 km	MPC · JPL
502224	2015 BK_{88}	—	November 3, 2005	Catalina	CSS	·	1.4 km	MPC · JPL
502225	2015 BN_{88}	—	January 13, 2008	Mount Lemmon	Mount Lemmon Survey	·	540 m	MPC · JPL
502226	2015 BQ_{88}	—	September 4, 2008	Kitt Peak	Spacewatch	·	1.8 km	MPC · JPL
502227	2015 BU_{88}	—	January 16, 2011	Mount Lemmon	Mount Lemmon Survey	·	1.2 km	MPC · JPL
502228	2015 BA_{89}	—	October 19, 2010	Mount Lemmon	Mount Lemmon Survey	·	850 m	MPC · JPL
502229	2015 BE_{89}	—	September 3, 1999	Kitt Peak	Spacewatch	(12739)	1.9 km	MPC · JPL
502230	2015 BO_{89}	—	March 9, 2003	Kitt Peak	Spacewatch	RAF	1.0 km	MPC · JPL
502231	2015 BV_{89}	—	November 11, 2006	Kitt Peak	Spacewatch	MAS	690 m	MPC · JPL
502232	2015 BX_{89}	—	March 27, 2011	Mount Lemmon	Mount Lemmon Survey	·	1.3 km	MPC · JPL
502233	2015 BQ_{90}	—	September 27, 1998	Kitt Peak	Spacewatch	NYS	1.0 km	MPC · JPL
502234	2015 BS_{90}	—	January 18, 2015	Mount Lemmon	Mount Lemmon Survey	·	1.4 km	MPC · JPL
502235	2015 BZ_{90}	—	February 11, 2002	Socorro	LINEAR	·	1.5 km	MPC · JPL
502236	2015 BA_{91}	—	January 21, 2010	WISE	WISE	·	2.4 km	MPC · JPL
502237	2015 BO_{91}	—	March 12, 2010	Mount Lemmon	Mount Lemmon Survey	·	2.0 km	MPC · JPL
502238	2015 BN_{93}	—	October 9, 2004	Kitt Peak	Spacewatch	AGN	1.1 km	MPC · JPL
502239	2015 BJ_{94}	—	January 4, 2011	Mount Lemmon	Mount Lemmon Survey	·	970 m	MPC · JPL
502240	2015 BQ_{96}	—	March 4, 2008	Mount Lemmon	Mount Lemmon Survey	·	1.1 km	MPC · JPL
502241	2015 BL_{98}	—	July 14, 2013	Haleakala	Pan-STARRS 1	·	840 m	MPC · JPL
502242	2015 BS_{98}	—	September 18, 2004	Socorro	LINEAR	·	1.8 km	MPC · JPL
502243	2015 BC_{99}	—	March 10, 2005	Mount Lemmon	Mount Lemmon Survey	·	1.7 km	MPC · JPL
502244	2015 BA_{100}	—	October 9, 2013	Mount Lemmon	Mount Lemmon Survey	KOR	1.1 km	MPC · JPL
502245	2015 BC_{100}	—	November 23, 2009	Kitt Peak	Spacewatch	·	1.6 km	MPC · JPL
502246	2015 BH_{100}	—	December 13, 2006	Mount Lemmon	Mount Lemmon Survey	NYS	960 m	MPC · JPL
502247	2015 BV_{100}	—	October 30, 2005	Mount Lemmon	Mount Lemmon Survey	·	1.2 km	MPC · JPL
502248	2015 BS_{101}	—	June 8, 2011	Mount Lemmon	Mount Lemmon Survey	·	2.3 km	MPC · JPL
502249	2015 BE_{102}	—	October 2, 2013	Haleakala	Pan-STARRS 1	·	1.2 km	MPC · JPL
502250	2015 BV_{102}	—	July 30, 2008	Mount Lemmon	Mount Lemmon Survey	·	1.6 km	MPC · JPL
502251	2015 BJ_{103}	—	January 16, 2015	Haleakala	Pan-STARRS 1	EOS	1.6 km	MPC · JPL
502252	2015 BM_{103}	—	February 9, 2010	Kitt Peak	Spacewatch	·	1.9 km	MPC · JPL
502253	2015 BP_{107}	—	September 11, 2004	Kitt Peak	Spacewatch	·	2.0 km	MPC · JPL
502254	2015 BB_{113}	—	May 9, 2010	WISE	WISE	·	2.5 km	MPC · JPL
502255	2015 BS_{117}	—	November 23, 2003	Kitt Peak	Spacewatch	·	2.4 km	MPC · JPL
502256	2015 BS_{118}	—	February 17, 2002	Piszkéstető	Kelemen, J.	·	1.9 km	MPC · JPL
502257	2015 BT_{118}	—	November 4, 2013	Mount Lemmon	Mount Lemmon Survey	·	1.4 km	MPC · JPL
502258	2015 BK_{119}	—	December 14, 1998	Kitt Peak	Spacewatch	·	1.1 km	MPC · JPL
502259	2015 BN_{119}	—	January 25, 2006	Kitt Peak	Spacewatch	MRX	1.0 km	MPC · JPL
502260	2015 BT_{119}	—	January 31, 2006	Kitt Peak	Spacewatch	·	1.7 km	MPC · JPL
502261	2015 BM_{120}	—	November 20, 2009	Kitt Peak	Spacewatch	·	1.4 km	MPC · JPL
502262	2015 BE_{121}	—	August 4, 2008	Siding Spring	SSS	·	2.4 km	MPC · JPL
502263	2015 BW_{121}	—	October 24, 2005	Kitt Peak	Spacewatch	·	1.2 km	MPC · JPL
502264	2015 BD_{122}	—	April 23, 2007	Kitt Peak	Spacewatch	·	1.7 km	MPC · JPL
502265	2015 BM_{122}	—	May 10, 2010	WISE	WISE	·	3.4 km	MPC · JPL
502266	2015 BN_{122}	—	January 17, 2015	Haleakala	Pan-STARRS 1	WIT	1.1 km	MPC · JPL
502267	2015 BF_{124}	—	March 30, 2011	Mount Lemmon	Mount Lemmon Survey	AGN	1.0 km	MPC · JPL
502268	2015 BH_{124}	—	April 6, 2011	Mount Lemmon	Mount Lemmon Survey	·	1.5 km	MPC · JPL
502269	2015 BO_{125}	—	June 10, 2010	WISE	WISE	·	2.9 km	MPC · JPL
502270	2015 BR_{125}	—	December 27, 2005	Kitt Peak	Spacewatch	·	1.6 km	MPC · JPL
502271	2015 BQ_{126}	—	August 28, 2009	Kitt Peak	Spacewatch	·	700 m	MPC · JPL
502272	2015 BM_{128}	—	October 2, 2008	Mount Lemmon	Mount Lemmon Survey	·	1.5 km	MPC · JPL
502273	2015 BP_{129}	—	December 14, 1995	Kitt Peak	Spacewatch	AEO	1.3 km	MPC · JPL
502274	2015 BC_{130}	—	October 4, 2006	Mount Lemmon	Mount Lemmon Survey	NYS	1.0 km	MPC · JPL
502275	2015 BQ_{130}	—	September 4, 2008	Kitt Peak	Spacewatch	·	1.8 km	MPC · JPL
502276	2015 BY_{132}	—	November 8, 2008	Mount Lemmon	Mount Lemmon Survey	EOS	1.5 km	MPC · JPL
502277	2015 BS_{133}	—	August 30, 2005	Kitt Peak	Spacewatch	·	1.1 km	MPC · JPL
502278	2015 BT_{133}	—	September 28, 2013	Mount Lemmon	Mount Lemmon Survey	·	1.8 km	MPC · JPL
502279	2015 BP_{134}	—	December 14, 2001	Kitt Peak	Spacewatch	·	1.6 km	MPC · JPL
502280	2015 BW_{135}	—	August 17, 1999	Kitt Peak	Spacewatch	·	830 m	MPC · JPL
502281	2015 BR_{136}	—	January 26, 2006	Kitt Peak	Spacewatch	·	2.7 km	MPC · JPL
502282	2015 BD_{138}	—	June 2, 2010	WISE	WISE	EUP	4.7 km	MPC · JPL
502283	2015 BB_{139}	—	October 5, 2013	Haleakala	Pan-STARRS 1	·	1.3 km	MPC · JPL
502284	2015 BE_{140}	—	September 24, 2008	Kitt Peak	Spacewatch	·	1.8 km	MPC · JPL
502285	2015 BP_{140}	—	September 10, 2007	Mount Lemmon	Mount Lemmon Survey	·	2.0 km	MPC · JPL
502286	2015 BT_{140}	—	October 2, 2013	Kitt Peak	Spacewatch	·	1.8 km	MPC · JPL
502287	2015 BZ_{140}	—	August 20, 2006	Palomar	NEAT	·	950 m	MPC · JPL
502288	2015 BD_{141}	—	April 22, 2007	Kitt Peak	Spacewatch	WIT	920 m	MPC · JPL
502289	2015 BL_{141}	—	January 25, 2011	Mount Lemmon	Mount Lemmon Survey	·	1.2 km	MPC · JPL
502290	2015 BO_{141}	—	March 25, 2010	Kitt Peak	Spacewatch	·	2.8 km	MPC · JPL
502291	2015 BS_{141}	—	April 7, 2008	Kitt Peak	Spacewatch	·	1.3 km	MPC · JPL
502292	2015 BY_{141}	—	September 18, 2009	Mount Lemmon	Mount Lemmon Survey	·	1.5 km	MPC · JPL
502293	2015 BK_{142}	—	March 29, 2011	Mount Lemmon	Mount Lemmon Survey	·	1.7 km	MPC · JPL
502294	2015 BT_{143}	—	May 1, 2000	Kitt Peak	Spacewatch	·	2.8 km	MPC · JPL
502295	2015 BB_{144}	—	April 9, 2003	Kitt Peak	Spacewatch	·	1.3 km	MPC · JPL
502296	2015 BB_{146}	—	October 2, 2006	Mount Lemmon	Mount Lemmon Survey	·	840 m	MPC · JPL
502297	2015 BC_{146}	—	July 19, 2011	Haleakala	Pan-STARRS 1	·	3.1 km	MPC · JPL
502298	2015 BQ_{146}	—	August 4, 2013	Haleakala	Pan-STARRS 1	·	1.2 km	MPC · JPL
502299	2015 BJ_{147}	—	May 3, 2005	Kitt Peak	Spacewatch	·	2.7 km	MPC · JPL
502300	2015 BK_{147}	—	September 6, 2008	Mount Lemmon	Mount Lemmon Survey	·	1.5 km	MPC · JPL

== 502301–502400 ==
back to top

Designation			Discovery			Properties		Ref
Permanent	Provisional	Named after	Date	Site	Discoverer(s)	Category	Diam.	Ref
502301	2015 BP_{148}	—	December 6, 2010	Mount Lemmon	Mount Lemmon Survey	·	1.1 km	MPC · JPL
502302	2015 BQ_{148}	—	September 22, 2008	Kitt Peak	Spacewatch	KOR	1.2 km	MPC · JPL
502303	2015 BT_{148}	—	December 6, 2010	Kitt Peak	Spacewatch	·	1.3 km	MPC · JPL
502304	2015 BL_{149}	—	March 9, 1999	Kitt Peak	Spacewatch	EOS	1.7 km	MPC · JPL
502305	2015 BQ_{149}	—	March 3, 2005	Kitt Peak	Spacewatch	·	1.9 km	MPC · JPL
502306	2015 BF_{150}	—	October 31, 2013	Kitt Peak	Spacewatch	·	1.8 km	MPC · JPL
502307	2015 BU_{150}	—	October 15, 2013	Kitt Peak	Spacewatch	HOF	2.3 km	MPC · JPL
502308	2015 BA_{151}	—	September 6, 2008	Kitt Peak	Spacewatch	·	1.5 km	MPC · JPL
502309	2015 BC_{151}	—	September 6, 2013	Mount Lemmon	Mount Lemmon Survey	·	1.8 km	MPC · JPL
502310	2015 BG_{151}	—	September 22, 2009	Mount Lemmon	Mount Lemmon Survey	·	1.3 km	MPC · JPL
502311	2015 BQ_{151}	—	December 13, 2010	Mount Lemmon	Mount Lemmon Survey	·	1.0 km	MPC · JPL
502312	2015 BA_{153}	—	January 17, 2015	Haleakala	Pan-STARRS 1	·	2.3 km	MPC · JPL
502313	2015 BV_{153}	—	December 8, 2010	Mount Lemmon	Mount Lemmon Survey	·	1.0 km	MPC · JPL
502314	2015 BZ_{154}	—	February 15, 2010	Mount Lemmon	Mount Lemmon Survey	EOS	1.4 km	MPC · JPL
502315	2015 BB_{155}	—	January 15, 2010	Mount Lemmon	Mount Lemmon Survey	·	2.6 km	MPC · JPL
502316	2015 BX_{156}	—	February 9, 2010	Mount Lemmon	Mount Lemmon Survey	·	2.1 km	MPC · JPL
502317	2015 BF_{157}	—	January 17, 2015	Mount Lemmon	Mount Lemmon Survey	·	2.3 km	MPC · JPL
502318	2015 BU_{159}	—	February 16, 2010	Kitt Peak	Spacewatch	TEL	1.1 km	MPC · JPL
502319	2015 BW_{159}	—	September 14, 1994	Kitt Peak	Spacewatch	AGN	1.1 km	MPC · JPL
502320	2015 BJ_{160}	—	April 1, 2011	Mount Lemmon	Mount Lemmon Survey	AGN	1.1 km	MPC · JPL
502321	2015 BL_{160}	—	September 4, 2008	Kitt Peak	Spacewatch	AGN	1.1 km	MPC · JPL
502322	2015 BD_{161}	—	March 2, 2011	Mount Lemmon	Mount Lemmon Survey	·	1.8 km	MPC · JPL
502323	2015 BX_{163}	—	February 8, 2011	Mount Lemmon	Mount Lemmon Survey	MAR	810 m	MPC · JPL
502324	2015 BM_{164}	—	October 3, 2013	Haleakala	Pan-STARRS 1	·	1.7 km	MPC · JPL
502325	2015 BO_{165}	—	November 1, 2013	Kitt Peak	Spacewatch	·	1.9 km	MPC · JPL
502326	2015 BW_{166}	—	January 22, 2006	Mount Lemmon	Mount Lemmon Survey	WIT	810 m	MPC · JPL
502327	2015 BL_{167}	—	July 28, 2009	Catalina	CSS	·	1.5 km	MPC · JPL
502328	2015 BM_{168}	—	March 11, 2005	Mount Lemmon	Mount Lemmon Survey	·	2.5 km	MPC · JPL
502329	2015 BD_{169}	—	December 29, 2005	Kitt Peak	Spacewatch	·	1.4 km	MPC · JPL
502330	2015 BE_{169}	—	June 4, 2010	WISE	WISE	·	2.4 km	MPC · JPL
502331	2015 BW_{171}	—	September 30, 2006	Mount Lemmon	Mount Lemmon Survey	MAS	650 m	MPC · JPL
502332	2015 BO_{173}	—	February 5, 2011	Haleakala	Pan-STARRS 1	·	1.1 km	MPC · JPL
502333	2015 BM_{176}	—	February 14, 2010	Kitt Peak	Spacewatch	·	4.1 km	MPC · JPL
502334	2015 BT_{179}	—	February 5, 2011	Haleakala	Pan-STARRS 1	·	1.0 km	MPC · JPL
502335	2015 BR_{184}	—	March 10, 2003	Kitt Peak	Spacewatch	·	3.1 km	MPC · JPL
502336	2015 BA_{185}	—	January 17, 2015	Haleakala	Pan-STARRS 1	·	1.8 km	MPC · JPL
502337	2015 BB_{186}	—	November 23, 2006	Mount Lemmon	Mount Lemmon Survey	·	1.2 km	MPC · JPL
502338	2015 BF_{187}	—	October 23, 2004	Kitt Peak	Spacewatch	·	1.8 km	MPC · JPL
502339	2015 BZ_{187}	—	January 2, 2009	Mount Lemmon	Mount Lemmon Survey	·	2.9 km	MPC · JPL
502340	2015 BJ_{189}	—	May 6, 2008	Mount Lemmon	Mount Lemmon Survey	·	1.1 km	MPC · JPL
502341	2015 BB_{191}	—	February 11, 2002	Socorro	LINEAR	·	1.9 km	MPC · JPL
502342	2015 BJ_{193}	—	December 11, 2009	Mount Lemmon	Mount Lemmon Survey	·	1.7 km	MPC · JPL
502343	2015 BK_{193}	—	September 28, 2013	Mount Lemmon	Mount Lemmon Survey	·	1.6 km	MPC · JPL
502344	2015 BH_{195}	—	August 14, 2013	Haleakala	Pan-STARRS 1	·	930 m	MPC · JPL
502345	2015 BV_{195}	—	March 27, 2011	Mount Lemmon	Mount Lemmon Survey	PAD	1.5 km	MPC · JPL
502346	2015 BJ_{197}	—	August 27, 2009	Kitt Peak	Spacewatch	·	850 m	MPC · JPL
502347	2015 BP_{198}	—	February 25, 2006	Kitt Peak	Spacewatch	·	1.9 km	MPC · JPL
502348	2015 BR_{200}	—	July 25, 2006	Mount Lemmon	Mount Lemmon Survey	·	3.1 km	MPC · JPL
502349	2015 BN_{203}	—	December 31, 2008	Kitt Peak	Spacewatch	·	4.5 km	MPC · JPL
502350	2015 BS_{203}	—	October 11, 2010	Catalina	CSS	·	730 m	MPC · JPL
502351	2015 BH_{204}	—	September 21, 2009	Mount Lemmon	Mount Lemmon Survey	·	900 m	MPC · JPL
502352	2015 BT_{205}	—	January 9, 2011	Mount Lemmon	Mount Lemmon Survey	EUN	1.0 km	MPC · JPL
502353	2015 BU_{205}	—	January 6, 2006	Mount Lemmon	Mount Lemmon Survey	MRX	900 m	MPC · JPL
502354	2015 BY_{207}	—	December 27, 2005	Mount Lemmon	Mount Lemmon Survey	·	2.8 km	MPC · JPL
502355	2015 BM_{213}	—	May 13, 2010	WISE	WISE	·	3.6 km	MPC · JPL
502356	2015 BV_{213}	—	December 17, 2009	Kitt Peak	Spacewatch	AGN	1.3 km	MPC · JPL
502357	2015 BT_{215}	—	December 5, 2005	Mount Lemmon	Mount Lemmon Survey	·	1.7 km	MPC · JPL
502358	2015 BT_{222}	—	October 11, 2007	Kitt Peak	Spacewatch	·	3.5 km	MPC · JPL
502359	2015 BW_{222}	—	August 23, 2004	Kitt Peak	Spacewatch	·	2.0 km	MPC · JPL
502360	2015 BJ_{223}	—	December 26, 2014	Haleakala	Pan-STARRS 1	HOF	2.2 km	MPC · JPL
502361	2015 BS_{224}	—	November 26, 2009	Mount Lemmon	Mount Lemmon Survey	MRX	930 m	MPC · JPL
502362	2015 BL_{225}	—	October 16, 1995	Kitt Peak	Spacewatch	·	610 m	MPC · JPL
502363	2015 BO_{231}	—	September 17, 2009	Kitt Peak	Spacewatch	·	1.6 km	MPC · JPL
502364	2015 BK_{233}	—	November 21, 2008	Mount Lemmon	Mount Lemmon Survey	·	2.4 km	MPC · JPL
502365	2015 BR_{233}	—	September 6, 2008	Mount Lemmon	Mount Lemmon Survey	EUN	1.4 km	MPC · JPL
502366	2015 BQ_{238}	—	December 6, 2005	Kitt Peak	Spacewatch	·	1.7 km	MPC · JPL
502367	2015 BR_{238}	—	June 12, 2012	Kitt Peak	Spacewatch	·	3.2 km	MPC · JPL
502368	2015 BZ_{238}	—	November 18, 2006	Kitt Peak	Spacewatch	·	970 m	MPC · JPL
502369	2015 BG_{240}	—	January 8, 2006	Mount Lemmon	Mount Lemmon Survey	·	1.8 km	MPC · JPL
502370	2015 BT_{240}	—	February 10, 2008	Kitt Peak	Spacewatch	·	900 m	MPC · JPL
502371	2015 BU_{240}	—	May 21, 2012	Mount Lemmon	Mount Lemmon Survey	·	1.9 km	MPC · JPL
502372	2015 BH_{241}	—	January 6, 2006	Kitt Peak	Spacewatch	·	1.5 km	MPC · JPL
502373	2015 BL_{241}	—	August 20, 2009	Kitt Peak	Spacewatch	·	1 km	MPC · JPL
502374	2015 BE_{242}	—	February 21, 2007	Mount Lemmon	Mount Lemmon Survey	·	1.3 km	MPC · JPL
502375	2015 BO_{242}	—	April 5, 2011	Mount Lemmon	Mount Lemmon Survey	·	1.7 km	MPC · JPL
502376	2015 BS_{242}	—	December 18, 2003	Socorro	LINEAR	·	1.0 km	MPC · JPL
502377	2015 BV_{242}	—	March 4, 2011	Mount Lemmon	Mount Lemmon Survey	·	1.7 km	MPC · JPL
502378	2015 BW_{242}	—	January 13, 2010	WISE	WISE	·	3.0 km	MPC · JPL
502379	2015 BC_{243}	—	January 5, 2006	Kitt Peak	Spacewatch	·	1.8 km	MPC · JPL
502380	2015 BN_{243}	—	September 19, 2012	Mount Lemmon	Mount Lemmon Survey	·	2.4 km	MPC · JPL
502381	2015 BS_{243}	—	September 4, 2008	Kitt Peak	Spacewatch	HOF	2.6 km	MPC · JPL
502382	2015 BT_{243}	—	November 17, 2006	Mount Lemmon	Mount Lemmon Survey	·	1 km	MPC · JPL
502383	2015 BA_{244}	—	June 16, 2012	Mount Lemmon	Mount Lemmon Survey	·	1.7 km	MPC · JPL
502384	2015 BU_{244}	—	January 16, 2004	Kitt Peak	Spacewatch	·	890 m	MPC · JPL
502385	2015 BW_{244}	—	September 23, 2008	Kitt Peak	Spacewatch	AGN	980 m	MPC · JPL
502386	2015 BN_{245}	—	February 7, 2008	Kitt Peak	Spacewatch	·	910 m	MPC · JPL
502387	2015 BW_{245}	—	August 13, 2012	Haleakala	Pan-STARRS 1	EOS	1.8 km	MPC · JPL
502388	2015 BC_{246}	—	August 12, 2013	Haleakala	Pan-STARRS 1	·	1.0 km	MPC · JPL
502389	2015 BD_{246}	—	February 1, 2006	Mount Lemmon	Mount Lemmon Survey	(12739)	1.4 km	MPC · JPL
502390	2015 BP_{246}	—	December 2, 2005	Mount Lemmon	Mount Lemmon Survey	·	2.0 km	MPC · JPL
502391	2015 BY_{247}	—	August 19, 2006	Anderson Mesa	LONEOS	·	3.4 km	MPC · JPL
502392	2015 BG_{248}	—	October 3, 2013	Mount Lemmon	Mount Lemmon Survey	EOS	2.0 km	MPC · JPL
502393	2015 BK_{248}	—	September 17, 2009	Mount Lemmon	Mount Lemmon Survey	·	1.3 km	MPC · JPL
502394	2015 BP_{248}	—	November 4, 2004	Kitt Peak	Spacewatch	·	1.7 km	MPC · JPL
502395	2015 BC_{249}	—	October 25, 2005	Mount Lemmon	Mount Lemmon Survey	·	1.1 km	MPC · JPL
502396	2015 BV_{249}	—	January 27, 2007	Kitt Peak	Spacewatch	·	850 m	MPC · JPL
502397	2015 BV_{250}	—	October 3, 2013	Haleakala	Pan-STARRS 1	·	1.6 km	MPC · JPL
502398	2015 BJ_{251}	—	September 25, 2006	Mount Lemmon	Mount Lemmon Survey	MAS	630 m	MPC · JPL
502399	2015 BO_{251}	—	August 22, 2004	Kitt Peak	Spacewatch	·	1.4 km	MPC · JPL
502400	2015 BP_{251}	—	September 2, 2010	Mount Lemmon	Mount Lemmon Survey	·	520 m	MPC · JPL

== 502401–502500 ==
back to top

Designation			Discovery			Properties		Ref
Permanent	Provisional	Named after	Date	Site	Discoverer(s)	Category	Diam.	Ref
502401	2015 BR_{251}	—	February 17, 2004	Kitt Peak	Spacewatch	·	2.4 km	MPC · JPL
502402	2015 BF_{252}	—	September 2, 2013	Mount Lemmon	Mount Lemmon Survey	·	1.1 km	MPC · JPL
502403	2015 BG_{252}	—	April 24, 2007	Kitt Peak	Spacewatch	·	1.7 km	MPC · JPL
502404	2015 BW_{252}	—	December 11, 2004	Kitt Peak	Spacewatch	·	2.1 km	MPC · JPL
502405	2015 BD_{253}	—	May 24, 2010	WISE	WISE	EOS	3.8 km	MPC · JPL
502406	2015 BO_{253}	—	March 13, 2011	Mount Lemmon	Mount Lemmon Survey	·	1.9 km	MPC · JPL
502407	2015 BR_{253}	—	January 18, 2015	Haleakala	Pan-STARRS 1	·	1.5 km	MPC · JPL
502408	2015 BS_{253}	—	April 23, 2011	Haleakala	Pan-STARRS 1	AGN	1.2 km	MPC · JPL
502409	2015 BA_{254}	—	October 9, 2004	Kitt Peak	Spacewatch	NEM	2.4 km	MPC · JPL
502410	2015 BC_{254}	—	July 29, 2008	Mount Lemmon	Mount Lemmon Survey	·	1.9 km	MPC · JPL
502411	2015 BQ_{254}	—	February 6, 2006	Kitt Peak	Spacewatch	·	2.1 km	MPC · JPL
502412	2015 BS_{254}	—	May 8, 2006	Mount Lemmon	Mount Lemmon Survey	·	3.1 km	MPC · JPL
502413	2015 BT_{254}	—	July 1, 2010	WISE	WISE	·	2.4 km	MPC · JPL
502414	2015 BJ_{255}	—	January 19, 2010	WISE	WISE	·	2.1 km	MPC · JPL
502415	2015 BL_{255}	—	December 10, 2010	Mount Lemmon	Mount Lemmon Survey	ADE	2.0 km	MPC · JPL
502416	2015 BN_{255}	—	July 19, 2007	Mount Lemmon	Mount Lemmon Survey	·	3.1 km	MPC · JPL
502417	2015 BO_{255}	—	November 21, 2008	Kitt Peak	Spacewatch	·	2.9 km	MPC · JPL
502418	2015 BB_{256}	—	August 13, 2012	Haleakala	Pan-STARRS 1	·	2.4 km	MPC · JPL
502419	2015 BD_{256}	—	May 30, 2006	Mount Lemmon	Mount Lemmon Survey	HYG	3.1 km	MPC · JPL
502420	2015 BF_{256}	—	March 17, 2004	Kitt Peak	Spacewatch	·	2.8 km	MPC · JPL
502421	2015 BS_{256}	—	August 25, 2004	Kitt Peak	Spacewatch	·	3.0 km	MPC · JPL
502422	2015 BW_{256}	—	January 10, 2006	Kitt Peak	Spacewatch	·	2.0 km	MPC · JPL
502423	2015 BC_{257}	—	September 9, 2007	Kitt Peak	Spacewatch	·	4.6 km	MPC · JPL
502424	2015 BJ_{257}	—	February 3, 2008	Kitt Peak	Spacewatch	·	820 m	MPC · JPL
502425	2015 BN_{257}	—	October 9, 2008	Kitt Peak	Spacewatch	·	1.9 km	MPC · JPL
502426	2015 BA_{258}	—	September 21, 2003	Kitt Peak	Spacewatch	·	570 m	MPC · JPL
502427	2015 BC_{258}	—	October 13, 1999	Apache Point	SDSS	·	1.8 km	MPC · JPL
502428	2015 BH_{259}	—	January 31, 2006	Kitt Peak	Spacewatch	·	1.3 km	MPC · JPL
502429	2015 BG_{260}	—	April 30, 2011	Kitt Peak	Spacewatch	EOS	2.5 km	MPC · JPL
502430	2015 BD_{264}	—	November 27, 2009	Mount Lemmon	Mount Lemmon Survey	·	3.1 km	MPC · JPL
502431	2015 BX_{268}	—	June 10, 2005	Kitt Peak	Spacewatch	·	1.3 km	MPC · JPL
502432	2015 BB_{269}	—	January 30, 2004	Kitt Peak	Spacewatch	·	1.3 km	MPC · JPL
502433	2015 BO_{270}	—	November 25, 2013	Haleakala	Pan-STARRS 1	AGN	1.1 km	MPC · JPL
502434	2015 BG_{274}	—	January 28, 2007	Mount Lemmon	Mount Lemmon Survey	·	1.7 km	MPC · JPL
502435	2015 BH_{274}	—	October 2, 2006	Mount Lemmon	Mount Lemmon Survey	·	930 m	MPC · JPL
502436	2015 BY_{275}	—	January 26, 2001	Kitt Peak	Spacewatch	DOR	2.1 km	MPC · JPL
502437	2015 BD_{276}	—	November 29, 2013	Haleakala	Pan-STARRS 1	·	3.1 km	MPC · JPL
502438	2015 BH_{276}	—	January 6, 2010	Kitt Peak	Spacewatch	AGN	1.1 km	MPC · JPL
502439	2015 BQ_{276}	—	February 9, 2010	Kitt Peak	Spacewatch	EOS	1.9 km	MPC · JPL
502440	2015 BF_{277}	—	February 21, 2007	Mount Lemmon	Mount Lemmon Survey	·	1.3 km	MPC · JPL
502441	2015 BK_{277}	—	March 13, 2005	Molėtai	K. Černis, J. Zdanavičius	·	1.8 km	MPC · JPL
502442	2015 BL_{277}	—	February 6, 2007	Mount Lemmon	Mount Lemmon Survey	·	1.1 km	MPC · JPL
502443	2015 BT_{277}	—	January 12, 2010	WISE	WISE	·	2.3 km	MPC · JPL
502444	2015 BZ_{277}	—	January 30, 2006	Kitt Peak	Spacewatch	·	1.7 km	MPC · JPL
502445	2015 BK_{278}	—	November 25, 2013	Haleakala	Pan-STARRS 1	·	3.3 km	MPC · JPL
502446	2015 BT_{278}	—	March 17, 2005	Kitt Peak	Spacewatch	·	1.8 km	MPC · JPL
502447	2015 BB_{281}	—	April 20, 2007	Kitt Peak	Spacewatch	·	1.7 km	MPC · JPL
502448	2015 BO_{291}	—	January 19, 2015	Kitt Peak	Spacewatch	·	3.3 km	MPC · JPL
502449	2015 BR_{291}	—	May 26, 2011	Mount Lemmon	Mount Lemmon Survey	AGN	1.2 km	MPC · JPL
502450	2015 BU_{291}	—	November 6, 2013	Haleakala	Pan-STARRS 1	EOS	1.7 km	MPC · JPL
502451	2015 BW_{291}	—	August 14, 2012	Haleakala	Pan-STARRS 1	·	2.2 km	MPC · JPL
502452	2015 BF_{292}	—	October 10, 2007	Catalina	CSS	EOS	2.4 km	MPC · JPL
502453	2015 BZ_{292}	—	December 30, 2008	Catalina	CSS	·	3.0 km	MPC · JPL
502454	2015 BD_{293}	—	March 27, 2012	Kitt Peak	Spacewatch	PHO	1.1 km	MPC · JPL
502455	2015 BX_{294}	—	October 24, 2008	Mount Lemmon	Mount Lemmon Survey	·	4.1 km	MPC · JPL
502456	2015 BB_{304}	—	August 14, 2012	Haleakala	Pan-STARRS 1	·	2.5 km	MPC · JPL
502457	2015 BE_{304}	—	September 24, 2008	Kitt Peak	Spacewatch	·	2.2 km	MPC · JPL
502458	2015 BH_{305}	—	December 25, 2003	Kitt Peak	Spacewatch	·	2.3 km	MPC · JPL
502459	2015 BJ_{305}	—	January 19, 2015	Haleakala	Pan-STARRS 1	·	1.9 km	MPC · JPL
502460	2015 BB_{307}	—	September 12, 2007	Mount Lemmon	Mount Lemmon Survey	·	2.5 km	MPC · JPL
502461	2015 BD_{307}	—	June 8, 2011	Mount Lemmon	Mount Lemmon Survey	·	3.5 km	MPC · JPL
502462	2015 BE_{307}	—	May 9, 2010	WISE	WISE	·	3.4 km	MPC · JPL
502463	2015 BK_{310}	—	March 7, 2008	Kitt Peak	Spacewatch	·	1.4 km	MPC · JPL
502464	2015 BQ_{310}	—	November 29, 2003	Kitt Peak	Spacewatch	NYS	830 m	MPC · JPL
502465	2015 BM_{313}	—	February 2, 2006	Mount Lemmon	Mount Lemmon Survey	·	2.2 km	MPC · JPL
502466	2015 BW_{314}	—	July 7, 2003	Kitt Peak	Spacewatch	·	2.3 km	MPC · JPL
502467	2015 BK_{316}	—	March 3, 2006	Kitt Peak	Spacewatch	HOF	2.3 km	MPC · JPL
502468	2015 BX_{318}	—	September 13, 2007	Kitt Peak	Spacewatch	·	2.1 km	MPC · JPL
502469	2015 BD_{320}	—	October 1, 2013	Kitt Peak	Spacewatch	·	1.2 km	MPC · JPL
502470	2015 BU_{321}	—	October 20, 2006	Kitt Peak	Spacewatch	NYS	820 m	MPC · JPL
502471	2015 BD_{324}	—	November 25, 2006	Kitt Peak	Spacewatch	·	1.0 km	MPC · JPL
502472	2015 BW_{329}	—	December 24, 2006	Kitt Peak	Spacewatch	·	1.1 km	MPC · JPL
502473	2015 BS_{334}	—	October 10, 2007	Mount Lemmon	Mount Lemmon Survey	·	4.2 km	MPC · JPL
502474	2015 BY_{338}	—	June 4, 2005	Kitt Peak	Spacewatch	VER	2.7 km	MPC · JPL
502475	2015 BP_{339}	—	January 26, 2011	Mount Lemmon	Mount Lemmon Survey	·	1.1 km	MPC · JPL
502476	2015 BY_{339}	—	May 18, 2010	WISE	WISE	·	2.5 km	MPC · JPL
502477	2015 BN_{341}	—	June 26, 2010	WISE	WISE	·	4.7 km	MPC · JPL
502478	2015 BO_{341}	—	November 10, 2013	Mount Lemmon	Mount Lemmon Survey	·	1.3 km	MPC · JPL
502479	2015 BB_{346}	—	September 25, 2009	Catalina	CSS	·	1.7 km	MPC · JPL
502480	2015 BC_{353}	—	February 7, 2011	Mount Lemmon	Mount Lemmon Survey	·	700 m	MPC · JPL
502481	2015 BU_{353}	—	February 16, 2010	Kitt Peak	Spacewatch	·	3.6 km	MPC · JPL
502482	2015 BS_{354}	—	September 29, 2008	Kitt Peak	Spacewatch	AST	1.7 km	MPC · JPL
502483	2015 BT_{354}	—	September 24, 2008	Kitt Peak	Spacewatch	·	1.5 km	MPC · JPL
502484	2015 BX_{354}	—	May 4, 2010	Nogales	M. Schwartz, P. R. Holvorcem	·	4.7 km	MPC · JPL
502485	2015 BY_{355}	—	September 30, 2006	Catalina	CSS	·	1.1 km	MPC · JPL
502486	2015 BD_{356}	—	February 14, 2004	Kitt Peak	Spacewatch	·	2.9 km	MPC · JPL
502487	2015 BJ_{356}	—	January 19, 2015	Kitt Peak	Spacewatch	·	3.0 km	MPC · JPL
502488	2015 BM_{356}	—	February 1, 2006	Kitt Peak	Spacewatch	·	1.7 km	MPC · JPL
502489	2015 BR_{356}	—	May 10, 2005	Kitt Peak	Spacewatch	·	2.2 km	MPC · JPL
502490	2015 BC_{357}	—	October 6, 1999	Kitt Peak	Spacewatch	AGN	1.3 km	MPC · JPL
502491	2015 BF_{357}	—	February 6, 2010	Kitt Peak	Spacewatch	EOS	2.1 km	MPC · JPL
502492	2015 BO_{357}	—	March 31, 2011	Haleakala	Pan-STARRS 1	·	1.9 km	MPC · JPL
502493	2015 BZ_{381}	—	October 3, 2013	Haleakala	Pan-STARRS 1	AGN	1.1 km	MPC · JPL
502494	2015 BP_{389}	—	March 13, 2011	Kitt Peak	Spacewatch	HOF	2.4 km	MPC · JPL
502495	2015 BM_{395}	—	January 30, 2011	Haleakala	Pan-STARRS 1	·	2.2 km	MPC · JPL
502496	2015 BY_{395}	—	October 31, 2010	Mount Lemmon	Mount Lemmon Survey	·	730 m	MPC · JPL
502497	2015 BC_{398}	—	September 12, 2007	Mount Lemmon	Mount Lemmon Survey	·	2.1 km	MPC · JPL
502498	2015 BD_{398}	—	March 30, 2011	Mount Lemmon	Mount Lemmon Survey	·	1.9 km	MPC · JPL
502499	2015 BD_{401}	—	October 24, 2009	Kitt Peak	Spacewatch	·	1.2 km	MPC · JPL
502500	2015 BD_{405}	—	December 3, 2010	Kitt Peak	Spacewatch	MAS	630 m	MPC · JPL

== 502501–502600 ==
back to top

Designation			Discovery			Properties		Ref
Permanent	Provisional	Named after	Date	Site	Discoverer(s)	Category	Diam.	Ref
502501	2015 BW_{406}	—	August 20, 2004	Kitt Peak	Spacewatch	·	1.6 km	MPC · JPL
502502	2015 BN_{411}	—	January 20, 2015	Haleakala	Pan-STARRS 1	·	2.3 km	MPC · JPL
502503	2015 BS_{413}	—	August 16, 2009	Kitt Peak	Spacewatch	V	650 m	MPC · JPL
502504	2015 BY_{418}	—	October 7, 2004	Kitt Peak	Spacewatch	·	1.5 km	MPC · JPL
502505	2015 BE_{420}	—	August 26, 2012	Haleakala	Pan-STARRS 1	·	2.7 km	MPC · JPL
502506	2015 BK_{420}	—	December 20, 2009	Kitt Peak	Spacewatch	·	2.0 km	MPC · JPL
502507	2015 BQ_{420}	—	August 26, 2012	Haleakala	Pan-STARRS 1	·	2.8 km	MPC · JPL
502508	2015 BU_{421}	—	September 4, 2007	Mount Lemmon	Mount Lemmon Survey	KOR	1.6 km	MPC · JPL
502509	2015 BP_{422}	—	January 21, 2002	Kitt Peak	Spacewatch	·	1.4 km	MPC · JPL
502510	2015 BR_{422}	—	September 13, 2013	Catalina	CSS	EUN	970 m	MPC · JPL
502511	2015 BU_{422}	—	September 7, 2008	Mount Lemmon	Mount Lemmon Survey	·	2.0 km	MPC · JPL
502512	2015 BB_{423}	—	January 20, 2015	Haleakala	Pan-STARRS 1	·	1.7 km	MPC · JPL
502513	2015 BR_{424}	—	March 18, 2010	Mount Lemmon	Mount Lemmon Survey	·	2.0 km	MPC · JPL
502514	2015 BK_{426}	—	September 14, 2007	Kitt Peak	Spacewatch	·	1.6 km	MPC · JPL
502515	2015 BR_{426}	—	August 19, 2006	Kitt Peak	Spacewatch	·	3.2 km	MPC · JPL
502516	2015 BZ_{429}	—	March 14, 2007	Mount Lemmon	Mount Lemmon Survey	(5)	1.2 km	MPC · JPL
502517	2015 BQ_{430}	—	December 30, 2008	Kitt Peak	Spacewatch	·	3.4 km	MPC · JPL
502518	2015 BC_{432}	—	June 10, 2010	WISE	WISE	·	2.2 km	MPC · JPL
502519	2015 BL_{433}	—	January 23, 2006	Kitt Peak	Spacewatch	·	4.0 km	MPC · JPL
502520	2015 BY_{433}	—	March 4, 2006	Mount Lemmon	Mount Lemmon Survey	·	1.6 km	MPC · JPL
502521	2015 BA_{434}	—	December 18, 2009	Kitt Peak	Spacewatch	HOF	2.4 km	MPC · JPL
502522	2015 BO_{434}	—	March 2, 2006	Kitt Peak	Spacewatch	·	1.6 km	MPC · JPL
502523	2015 BC_{435}	—	February 25, 2006	Kitt Peak	Spacewatch	AGN	1.3 km	MPC · JPL
502524	2015 BY_{435}	—	January 20, 2015	Haleakala	Pan-STARRS 1	·	2.8 km	MPC · JPL
502525	2015 BK_{436}	—	September 15, 2009	Kitt Peak	Spacewatch	·	960 m	MPC · JPL
502526	2015 BD_{437}	—	October 17, 2008	Kitt Peak	Spacewatch	AGN	1.2 km	MPC · JPL
502527	2015 BA_{438}	—	February 4, 2006	Kitt Peak	Spacewatch	·	1.4 km	MPC · JPL
502528	2015 BM_{438}	—	November 28, 2013	Mount Lemmon	Mount Lemmon Survey	·	1.3 km	MPC · JPL
502529	2015 BY_{438}	—	March 10, 2005	Mount Lemmon	Mount Lemmon Survey	·	1.4 km	MPC · JPL
502530	2015 BG_{439}	—	December 18, 2009	Kitt Peak	Spacewatch	·	1.6 km	MPC · JPL
502531	2015 BP_{439}	—	August 26, 2012	Haleakala	Pan-STARRS 1	EOS	1.7 km	MPC · JPL
502532	2015 BU_{439}	—	February 25, 2006	Mount Lemmon	Mount Lemmon Survey	·	1.5 km	MPC · JPL
502533	2015 BF_{440}	—	November 8, 2007	Mount Lemmon	Mount Lemmon Survey	·	3.1 km	MPC · JPL
502534	2015 BH_{440}	—	February 14, 2005	Kitt Peak	Spacewatch	·	1.8 km	MPC · JPL
502535	2015 BF_{442}	—	September 6, 2008	Mount Lemmon	Mount Lemmon Survey	·	1.7 km	MPC · JPL
502536	2015 BU_{442}	—	February 14, 2010	Mount Lemmon	Mount Lemmon Survey	·	2.2 km	MPC · JPL
502537	2015 BK_{443}	—	January 6, 2010	Kitt Peak	Spacewatch	HOF	2.6 km	MPC · JPL
502538	2015 BY_{445}	—	November 6, 2013	Haleakala	Pan-STARRS 1	·	1.2 km	MPC · JPL
502539	2015 BC_{446}	—	October 21, 2009	Mount Lemmon	Mount Lemmon Survey	·	1.2 km	MPC · JPL
502540	2015 BM_{449}	—	December 30, 2008	Kitt Peak	Spacewatch	·	2.9 km	MPC · JPL
502541	2015 BG_{450}	—	December 4, 2008	Mount Lemmon	Mount Lemmon Survey	·	1.9 km	MPC · JPL
502542	2015 BH_{450}	—	December 18, 2009	Mount Lemmon	Mount Lemmon Survey	AGN	1.0 km	MPC · JPL
502543	2015 BQ_{451}	—	October 23, 2006	Mount Lemmon	Mount Lemmon Survey	·	970 m	MPC · JPL
502544	2015 BZ_{456}	—	March 15, 2010	Mount Lemmon	Mount Lemmon Survey	EOS	1.5 km	MPC · JPL
502545	2015 BP_{457}	—	December 3, 2005	Kitt Peak	Spacewatch	·	1.1 km	MPC · JPL
502546	2015 BQ_{459}	—	December 27, 2005	Kitt Peak	Spacewatch	·	1.6 km	MPC · JPL
502547	2015 BP_{463}	—	November 6, 2013	Haleakala	Pan-STARRS 1	·	1.6 km	MPC · JPL
502548	2015 BA_{466}	—	September 21, 2008	Mount Lemmon	Mount Lemmon Survey	HNS	1.4 km	MPC · JPL
502549	2015 BM_{467}	—	December 18, 2009	Mount Lemmon	Mount Lemmon Survey	·	2.0 km	MPC · JPL
502550	2015 BG_{468}	—	October 14, 1999	Kitt Peak	Spacewatch	·	2.1 km	MPC · JPL
502551	2015 BJ_{468}	—	March 14, 2011	Mount Lemmon	Mount Lemmon Survey	·	1.4 km	MPC · JPL
502552	2015 BD_{469}	—	February 14, 2010	WISE	WISE	·	5.0 km	MPC · JPL
502553	2015 BV_{470}	—	November 18, 2009	Mount Lemmon	Mount Lemmon Survey	·	1.4 km	MPC · JPL
502554	2015 BO_{472}	—	September 18, 2006	Kitt Peak	Spacewatch	·	2.8 km	MPC · JPL
502555	2015 BU_{472}	—	September 5, 2008	Kitt Peak	Spacewatch	·	2.0 km	MPC · JPL
502556	2015 BZ_{474}	—	August 9, 2013	Kitt Peak	Spacewatch	·	1.3 km	MPC · JPL
502557	2015 BC_{475}	—	February 1, 2006	Kitt Peak	Spacewatch	·	1.6 km	MPC · JPL
502558	2015 BK_{480}	—	October 18, 2009	Mount Lemmon	Mount Lemmon Survey	·	1.3 km	MPC · JPL
502559	2015 BL_{483}	—	September 12, 2007	Mount Lemmon	Mount Lemmon Survey	·	1.6 km	MPC · JPL
502560	2015 BE_{484}	—	June 21, 2007	Mount Lemmon	Mount Lemmon Survey	KOR	1.4 km	MPC · JPL
502561	2015 BU_{484}	—	October 31, 1999	Kitt Peak	Spacewatch	·	1.8 km	MPC · JPL
502562	2015 BR_{485}	—	October 22, 1995	Kitt Peak	Spacewatch	MAS	580 m	MPC · JPL
502563	2015 BH_{488}	—	December 7, 2010	Mount Lemmon	Mount Lemmon Survey	·	1.0 km	MPC · JPL
502564	2015 BL_{492}	—	December 31, 2008	Kitt Peak	Spacewatch	LIX	5.1 km	MPC · JPL
502565	2015 BN_{493}	—	February 4, 2006	Kitt Peak	Spacewatch	·	1.8 km	MPC · JPL
502566	2015 BY_{493}	—	March 2, 2006	Kitt Peak	Spacewatch	AGN	1.1 km	MPC · JPL
502567	2015 BW_{496}	—	April 5, 2011	Mount Lemmon	Mount Lemmon Survey	·	1.5 km	MPC · JPL
502568	2015 BK_{497}	—	September 28, 2013	Mount Lemmon	Mount Lemmon Survey	·	1.4 km	MPC · JPL
502569	2015 BC_{498}	—	February 2, 2006	Kitt Peak	Spacewatch	·	1.4 km	MPC · JPL
502570	2015 BS_{498}	—	November 17, 2009	Mount Lemmon	Mount Lemmon Survey	·	1.2 km	MPC · JPL
502571	2015 BE_{501}	—	September 24, 2008	Mount Lemmon	Mount Lemmon Survey	KOR	1.3 km	MPC · JPL
502572	2015 BA_{502}	—	February 28, 2006	Mount Lemmon	Mount Lemmon Survey	·	1.4 km	MPC · JPL
502573	2015 BB_{503}	—	October 6, 2004	Kitt Peak	Spacewatch	·	1.5 km	MPC · JPL
502574	2015 BP_{503}	—	November 3, 2000	Kitt Peak	Spacewatch	·	1.4 km	MPC · JPL
502575	2015 BU_{503}	—	August 17, 2012	Haleakala	Pan-STARRS 1	EOS	1.3 km	MPC · JPL
502576	2015 BC_{506}	—	February 5, 2010	Kitt Peak	Spacewatch	·	3.5 km	MPC · JPL
502577	2015 BJ_{507}	—	September 28, 2008	Mount Lemmon	Mount Lemmon Survey	·	1.8 km	MPC · JPL
502578	2015 BP_{507}	—	April 15, 2011	Haleakala	Pan-STARRS 1	KOR	1.2 km	MPC · JPL
502579	2015 BJ_{512}	—	October 5, 2010	Siding Spring	SSS	PHO	1.0 km	MPC · JPL
502580	2015 BJ_{513}	—	November 16, 2006	Kitt Peak	Spacewatch	·	1.8 km	MPC · JPL
502581	2015 CJ_{1}	—	August 26, 2013	Haleakala	Pan-STARRS 1	PHO	940 m	MPC · JPL
502582	2015 CL_{2}	—	June 8, 2011	Mount Lemmon	Mount Lemmon Survey	·	2.8 km	MPC · JPL
502583	2015 CJ_{3}	—	January 23, 2011	Mount Lemmon	Mount Lemmon Survey	·	1.0 km	MPC · JPL
502584	2015 CX_{3}	—	September 25, 2008	Mount Lemmon	Mount Lemmon Survey	·	2.0 km	MPC · JPL
502585	2015 CH_{4}	—	May 11, 2007	Mount Lemmon	Mount Lemmon Survey	·	2.1 km	MPC · JPL
502586	2015 CP_{4}	—	March 13, 2011	Kitt Peak	Spacewatch	·	1.8 km	MPC · JPL
502587	2015 CJ_{5}	—	January 19, 2004	Kitt Peak	Spacewatch	·	3.3 km	MPC · JPL
502588	2015 CN_{5}	—	November 30, 2005	Kitt Peak	Spacewatch	·	2.0 km	MPC · JPL
502589	2015 CS_{5}	—	March 6, 2011	Kitt Peak	Spacewatch	·	1.7 km	MPC · JPL
502590	2015 CK_{7}	—	August 10, 2007	Kitt Peak	Spacewatch	KOR	1.3 km	MPC · JPL
502591	2015 CQ_{7}	—	July 1, 2010	WISE	WISE	VER	3.4 km	MPC · JPL
502592	2015 CS_{7}	—	January 14, 2010	WISE	WISE	·	2.9 km	MPC · JPL
502593	2015 CW_{8}	—	December 19, 2009	Kitt Peak	Spacewatch	·	1.9 km	MPC · JPL
502594	2015 CB_{9}	—	November 2, 2013	Mount Lemmon	Mount Lemmon Survey	·	2.7 km	MPC · JPL
502595	2015 CP_{9}	—	August 29, 2005	Kitt Peak	Spacewatch	CYB	3.6 km	MPC · JPL
502596	2015 CW_{9}	—	October 16, 2006	Kitt Peak	Spacewatch	·	840 m	MPC · JPL
502597	2015 CZ_{9}	—	January 3, 2009	Kitt Peak	Spacewatch	THM	2.3 km	MPC · JPL
502598	2015 CM_{10}	—	February 14, 2010	Mount Lemmon	Mount Lemmon Survey	·	2.2 km	MPC · JPL
502599	2015 CQ_{10}	—	April 11, 2005	Mount Lemmon	Mount Lemmon Survey	·	2.3 km	MPC · JPL
502600	2015 CZ_{10}	—	September 17, 2004	Kitt Peak	Spacewatch	·	1.4 km	MPC · JPL

== 502601–502700 ==
back to top

Designation			Discovery			Properties		Ref
Permanent	Provisional	Named after	Date	Site	Discoverer(s)	Category	Diam.	Ref
502601	2015 CY_{11}	—	September 22, 2008	Kitt Peak	Spacewatch	·	1.9 km	MPC · JPL
502602	2015 CD_{14}	—	November 29, 2013	Haleakala	Pan-STARRS 1	·	3.1 km	MPC · JPL
502603	2015 CK_{14}	—	December 28, 2005	Kitt Peak	Spacewatch	·	1.5 km	MPC · JPL
502604	2015 CN_{14}	—	April 4, 2005	Mount Lemmon	Mount Lemmon Survey	·	2.2 km	MPC · JPL
502605	2015 CC_{15}	—	January 22, 2010	WISE	WISE	·	3.2 km	MPC · JPL
502606	2015 CE_{15}	—	October 4, 2007	Kitt Peak	Spacewatch	HYG	3.4 km	MPC · JPL
502607	2015 CB_{16}	—	August 24, 2008	Kitt Peak	Spacewatch	NEM	2.7 km	MPC · JPL
502608	2015 CW_{16}	—	September 9, 2007	Kitt Peak	Spacewatch	EOS	2.0 km	MPC · JPL
502609	2015 CF_{17}	—	January 13, 2010	WISE	WISE	EUP	3.5 km	MPC · JPL
502610	2015 CY_{18}	—	September 5, 2008	Kitt Peak	Spacewatch	·	1.9 km	MPC · JPL
502611	2015 CF_{19}	—	February 2, 2006	Kitt Peak	Spacewatch	·	2.3 km	MPC · JPL
502612	2015 CJ_{19}	—	December 8, 1999	Kitt Peak	Spacewatch	·	940 m	MPC · JPL
502613	2015 CE_{20}	—	June 12, 2010	WISE	WISE	·	4.1 km	MPC · JPL
502614	2015 CW_{20}	—	January 31, 2006	Kitt Peak	Spacewatch	PAD	1.2 km	MPC · JPL
502615	2015 CB_{21}	—	September 7, 2004	Kitt Peak	Spacewatch	·	1.5 km	MPC · JPL
502616	2015 CW_{21}	—	February 10, 2011	Mount Lemmon	Mount Lemmon Survey	·	1.5 km	MPC · JPL
502617	2015 CU_{22}	—	February 11, 2008	Mount Lemmon	Mount Lemmon Survey	·	1.1 km	MPC · JPL
502618	2015 CO_{23}	—	April 2, 2005	Kitt Peak	Spacewatch	·	2.0 km	MPC · JPL
502619	2015 CU_{23}	—	August 18, 2009	Kitt Peak	Spacewatch	·	1.2 km	MPC · JPL
502620	2015 CO_{24}	—	November 16, 2006	Catalina	CSS	·	990 m	MPC · JPL
502621	2015 CP_{25}	—	March 2, 2006	Mount Lemmon	Mount Lemmon Survey	·	2.3 km	MPC · JPL
502622	2015 CF_{26}	—	January 8, 1999	Kitt Peak	Spacewatch	·	1.5 km	MPC · JPL
502623	2015 CV_{26}	—	September 18, 2006	Kitt Peak	Spacewatch	·	920 m	MPC · JPL
502624	2015 CY_{27}	—	February 6, 2006	Kitt Peak	Spacewatch	·	2.3 km	MPC · JPL
502625	2015 CG_{29}	—	June 11, 2010	WISE	WISE	ARM	2.0 km	MPC · JPL
502626	2015 CK_{29}	—	March 15, 2010	Mount Lemmon	Mount Lemmon Survey	EMA	3.4 km	MPC · JPL
502627	2015 CU_{29}	—	March 10, 2007	Mount Lemmon	Mount Lemmon Survey	·	980 m	MPC · JPL
502628	2015 CB_{30}	—	October 1, 2008	Kitt Peak	Spacewatch	KOR	1.3 km	MPC · JPL
502629	2015 CC_{30}	—	March 30, 2011	Mount Lemmon	Mount Lemmon Survey	·	1.7 km	MPC · JPL
502630	2015 CF_{30}	—	January 23, 2006	Kitt Peak	Spacewatch	·	1.5 km	MPC · JPL
502631	2015 CG_{30}	—	February 14, 2010	Mount Lemmon	Mount Lemmon Survey	·	2.1 km	MPC · JPL
502632	2015 CQ_{30}	—	May 9, 2007	Mount Lemmon	Mount Lemmon Survey	·	1.4 km	MPC · JPL
502633	2015 CR_{31}	—	February 12, 2011	Mount Lemmon	Mount Lemmon Survey	·	1.1 km	MPC · JPL
502634	2015 CX_{31}	—	January 26, 2011	Mount Lemmon	Mount Lemmon Survey	·	1.0 km	MPC · JPL
502635	2015 CY_{32}	—	January 6, 2006	Catalina	CSS	·	1.6 km	MPC · JPL
502636	2015 CZ_{32}	—	April 16, 2010	WISE	WISE	·	3.3 km	MPC · JPL
502637	2015 CF_{33}	—	September 22, 2008	Mount Lemmon	Mount Lemmon Survey	·	2.5 km	MPC · JPL
502638	2015 CC_{35}	—	April 13, 2004	Kitt Peak	Spacewatch	·	1.3 km	MPC · JPL
502639	2015 CD_{35}	—	January 14, 2015	Haleakala	Pan-STARRS 1	·	2.1 km	MPC · JPL
502640	2015 CH_{38}	—	February 29, 2004	Kitt Peak	Spacewatch	·	3.1 km	MPC · JPL
502641	2015 CN_{38}	—	April 5, 2011	Mount Lemmon	Mount Lemmon Survey	·	1.2 km	MPC · JPL
502642	2015 CM_{39}	—	September 16, 2004	Kitt Peak	Spacewatch	HNS	1.2 km	MPC · JPL
502643	2015 CS_{41}	—	January 22, 2004	Socorro	LINEAR	EOS	2.3 km	MPC · JPL
502644	2015 CB_{42}	—	December 25, 2006	Kitt Peak	Spacewatch	·	1.5 km	MPC · JPL
502645	2015 CR_{42}	—	June 24, 2010	WISE	WISE	·	2.7 km	MPC · JPL
502646	2015 CW_{42}	—	September 7, 2008	Mount Lemmon	Mount Lemmon Survey	·	2.0 km	MPC · JPL
502647	2015 CX_{42}	—	September 4, 2008	Kitt Peak	Spacewatch	·	2.4 km	MPC · JPL
502648	2015 CC_{43}	—	January 16, 2008	Kitt Peak	Spacewatch	·	750 m	MPC · JPL
502649	2015 CF_{43}	—	June 3, 2010	WISE	WISE	·	3.2 km	MPC · JPL
502650	2015 CG_{43}	—	January 1, 2009	Kitt Peak	Spacewatch	·	2.1 km	MPC · JPL
502651	2015 CK_{43}	—	September 7, 2008	Catalina	CSS	EUN	1.5 km	MPC · JPL
502652	2015 CX_{43}	—	March 14, 2010	Kitt Peak	Spacewatch	·	2.6 km	MPC · JPL
502653	2015 CE_{44}	—	April 4, 2002	Palomar	NEAT	·	2.3 km	MPC · JPL
502654	2015 CO_{44}	—	December 19, 2003	Kitt Peak	Spacewatch	EOS	2.3 km	MPC · JPL
502655	2015 CE_{45}	—	January 8, 2010	Mount Lemmon	Mount Lemmon Survey	·	2.4 km	MPC · JPL
502656	2015 CS_{46}	—	February 12, 2004	Kitt Peak	Spacewatch	·	2.8 km	MPC · JPL
502657	2015 CO_{48}	—	December 20, 2009	Mount Lemmon	Mount Lemmon Survey	NEM	1.9 km	MPC · JPL
502658	2015 CU_{48}	—	February 24, 2006	Kitt Peak	Spacewatch	·	2.0 km	MPC · JPL
502659	2015 CN_{49}	—	July 30, 2008	Kitt Peak	Spacewatch	·	2.1 km	MPC · JPL
502660	2015 CY_{49}	—	October 23, 2004	Kitt Peak	Spacewatch	·	1.7 km	MPC · JPL
502661	2015 CC_{50}	—	February 19, 2010	Kitt Peak	Spacewatch	·	3.4 km	MPC · JPL
502662	2015 CM_{50}	—	December 10, 2005	Kitt Peak	Spacewatch	·	2.4 km	MPC · JPL
502663	2015 CE_{51}	—	January 1, 2009	Mount Lemmon	Mount Lemmon Survey	·	2.4 km	MPC · JPL
502664	2015 CF_{51}	—	February 23, 2004	Socorro	LINEAR	·	2.6 km	MPC · JPL
502665	2015 CM_{51}	—	September 24, 2008	Kitt Peak	Spacewatch	·	2.0 km	MPC · JPL
502666	2015 CX_{52}	—	August 14, 2012	Haleakala	Pan-STARRS 1	·	2.2 km	MPC · JPL
502667	2015 CB_{53}	—	October 5, 2012	Haleakala	Pan-STARRS 1	·	2.1 km	MPC · JPL
502668	2015 CD_{53}	—	November 3, 2008	Catalina	CSS	·	1.7 km	MPC · JPL
502669	2015 CG_{53}	—	November 17, 2006	Mount Lemmon	Mount Lemmon Survey	NYS	1.2 km	MPC · JPL
502670	2015 CK_{53}	—	October 6, 2008	Mount Lemmon	Mount Lemmon Survey	·	2.4 km	MPC · JPL
502671	2015 CZ_{53}	—	September 7, 2000	Kitt Peak	Spacewatch	·	1.3 km	MPC · JPL
502672	2015 CC_{54}	—	October 1, 2003	Kitt Peak	Spacewatch	·	2.5 km	MPC · JPL
502673	2015 CR_{54}	—	February 15, 2010	Kitt Peak	Spacewatch	BRA	1.3 km	MPC · JPL
502674	2015 CZ_{54}	—	January 31, 2009	Mount Lemmon	Mount Lemmon Survey	·	2.5 km	MPC · JPL
502675	2015 CH_{56}	—	September 14, 2007	Mount Lemmon	Mount Lemmon Survey	·	2.0 km	MPC · JPL
502676	2015 CN_{56}	—	September 17, 2006	Catalina	CSS	·	3.0 km	MPC · JPL
502677	2015 CO_{56}	—	January 23, 2015	Haleakala	Pan-STARRS 1	·	1.8 km	MPC · JPL
502678	2015 CQ_{56}	—	September 11, 2007	Mount Lemmon	Mount Lemmon Survey	·	2.4 km	MPC · JPL
502679	2015 CZ_{56}	—	January 29, 2009	Mount Lemmon	Mount Lemmon Survey	·	2.6 km	MPC · JPL
502680	2015 CB_{57}	—	November 19, 2009	Catalina	CSS	KON	2.5 km	MPC · JPL
502681	2015 CS_{57}	—	September 10, 2007	Kitt Peak	Spacewatch	·	1.8 km	MPC · JPL
502682	2015 CT_{57}	—	September 21, 2003	Kitt Peak	Spacewatch	·	2.8 km	MPC · JPL
502683	2015 CB_{58}	—	March 1, 1998	Kitt Peak	Spacewatch	THM	2.3 km	MPC · JPL
502684	2015 CX_{58}	—	February 24, 1995	Kitt Peak	Spacewatch	·	1.8 km	MPC · JPL
502685	2015 CR_{60}	—	December 10, 2009	Mount Lemmon	Mount Lemmon Survey	·	2.4 km	MPC · JPL
502686	2015 CE_{61}	—	November 25, 2013	XuYi	PMO NEO Survey Program	·	1.9 km	MPC · JPL
502687	2015 CQ_{61}	—	May 5, 2008	Siding Spring	SSS	·	2.5 km	MPC · JPL
502688	2015 CD_{62}	—	September 18, 2003	Kitt Peak	Spacewatch	·	3.0 km	MPC · JPL
502689	2015 CJ_{62}	—	November 25, 2005	Mount Lemmon	Mount Lemmon Survey	·	3.2 km	MPC · JPL
502690	2015 DK	—	February 7, 2006	Catalina	CSS	·	1.9 km	MPC · JPL
502691	2015 DW_{3}	—	November 18, 2006	Mount Lemmon	Mount Lemmon Survey	·	1.2 km	MPC · JPL
502692	2015 DG_{8}	—	October 1, 2013	Kitt Peak	Spacewatch	HOF	2.2 km	MPC · JPL
502693	2015 DH_{8}	—	December 4, 2005	Kitt Peak	Spacewatch	·	1.5 km	MPC · JPL
502694	2015 DN_{9}	—	October 5, 1996	Kitt Peak	Spacewatch	·	1.4 km	MPC · JPL
502695	2015 DU_{10}	—	January 23, 2006	Kitt Peak	Spacewatch	·	2.0 km	MPC · JPL
502696	2015 DP_{11}	—	October 4, 2013	Mount Lemmon	Mount Lemmon Survey	·	1.8 km	MPC · JPL
502697	2015 DL_{14}	—	February 1, 2006	Mount Lemmon	Mount Lemmon Survey	·	1.9 km	MPC · JPL
502698	2015 DK_{17}	—	January 24, 2007	Kitt Peak	Spacewatch	·	1.2 km	MPC · JPL
502699	2015 DN_{17}	—	April 27, 2011	Kitt Peak	Spacewatch	WIT	920 m	MPC · JPL
502700	2015 DS_{17}	—	March 7, 2008	Catalina	CSS	·	930 m	MPC · JPL

== 502701–502800 ==
back to top

Designation			Discovery			Properties		Ref
Permanent	Provisional	Named after	Date	Site	Discoverer(s)	Category	Diam.	Ref
502701	2015 DO_{18}	—	November 11, 2004	Kitt Peak	Spacewatch	AGN	1.2 km	MPC · JPL
502702	2015 DW_{18}	—	May 13, 2005	Kitt Peak	Spacewatch	·	2.2 km	MPC · JPL
502703	2015 DY_{18}	—	October 6, 2007	Kitt Peak	Spacewatch	·	2.8 km	MPC · JPL
502704	2015 DG_{19}	—	January 23, 2006	Kitt Peak	Spacewatch	·	1.6 km	MPC · JPL
502705	2015 DC_{20}	—	December 30, 2008	Mount Lemmon	Mount Lemmon Survey	·	3.3 km	MPC · JPL
502706	2015 DO_{20}	—	October 2, 2008	Mount Lemmon	Mount Lemmon Survey	·	1.7 km	MPC · JPL
502707	2015 DA_{21}	—	December 2, 2008	Kitt Peak	Spacewatch	·	1.8 km	MPC · JPL
502708	2015 DD_{21}	—	January 17, 2007	Kitt Peak	Spacewatch	·	1.2 km	MPC · JPL
502709	2015 DE_{22}	—	February 10, 2010	WISE	WISE	LIX	4.0 km	MPC · JPL
502710	2015 DH_{22}	—	November 22, 2009	Kitt Peak	Spacewatch	·	3.1 km	MPC · JPL
502711	2015 DR_{22}	—	January 29, 1998	Kitt Peak	Spacewatch	·	1.3 km	MPC · JPL
502712	2015 DM_{23}	—	February 27, 2006	Kitt Peak	Spacewatch	·	1.9 km	MPC · JPL
502713	2015 DS_{24}	—	August 4, 2008	Siding Spring	SSS	·	2.2 km	MPC · JPL
502714	2015 DZ_{24}	—	December 21, 2006	Kitt Peak	Spacewatch	NYS	1.1 km	MPC · JPL
502715	2015 DF_{25}	—	March 30, 2011	Mount Lemmon	Mount Lemmon Survey	·	1.1 km	MPC · JPL
502716	2015 DP_{26}	—	September 23, 2008	Mount Lemmon	Mount Lemmon Survey	HOF	2.4 km	MPC · JPL
502717	2015 DN_{27}	—	November 10, 2009	Kitt Peak	Spacewatch	·	1.5 km	MPC · JPL
502718	2015 DZ_{27}	—	April 27, 2006	Cerro Tololo	Deep Ecliptic Survey	·	1.8 km	MPC · JPL
502719	2015 DH_{28}	—	January 2, 2009	Mount Lemmon	Mount Lemmon Survey	·	1.7 km	MPC · JPL
502720	2015 DN_{28}	—	April 23, 2007	Kitt Peak	Spacewatch	·	1.7 km	MPC · JPL
502721	2015 DT_{30}	—	February 9, 2002	Kitt Peak	Spacewatch	(194)	1.5 km	MPC · JPL
502722	2015 DY_{30}	—	April 6, 2011	Mount Lemmon	Mount Lemmon Survey	·	1.8 km	MPC · JPL
502723	2015 DA_{31}	—	April 7, 2008	Mount Lemmon	Mount Lemmon Survey	·	1.1 km	MPC · JPL
502724	2015 DY_{31}	—	March 18, 2010	Mount Lemmon	Mount Lemmon Survey	TEL	1.4 km	MPC · JPL
502725	2015 DC_{32}	—	September 9, 2013	Haleakala	Pan-STARRS 1	·	1.4 km	MPC · JPL
502726	2015 DJ_{32}	—	May 3, 2011	Mount Lemmon	Mount Lemmon Survey	AEO	1.4 km	MPC · JPL
502727	2015 DM_{32}	—	November 17, 2009	Mount Lemmon	Mount Lemmon Survey	·	890 m	MPC · JPL
502728	2015 DA_{33}	—	February 17, 2001	Socorro	LINEAR	·	2.2 km	MPC · JPL
502729	2015 DC_{33}	—	January 23, 2006	Kitt Peak	Spacewatch	·	1.6 km	MPC · JPL
502730	2015 DL_{33}	—	March 18, 2004	Socorro	LINEAR	·	3.1 km	MPC · JPL
502731	2015 DX_{33}	—	September 19, 2006	Kitt Peak	Spacewatch	·	3.1 km	MPC · JPL
502732	2015 DY_{34}	—	January 17, 2005	Kitt Peak	Spacewatch	·	2.1 km	MPC · JPL
502733	2015 DZ_{34}	—	March 1, 2009	Mount Lemmon	Mount Lemmon Survey	CYB	2.9 km	MPC · JPL
502734	2015 DW_{35}	—	September 12, 2007	Mount Lemmon	Mount Lemmon Survey	·	1.8 km	MPC · JPL
502735	2015 DG_{36}	—	August 14, 2013	Haleakala	Pan-STARRS 1	·	1.4 km	MPC · JPL
502736	2015 DG_{37}	—	February 16, 2010	Kitt Peak	Spacewatch	·	1.7 km	MPC · JPL
502737	2015 DD_{38}	—	November 8, 2007	Kitt Peak	Spacewatch	·	2.6 km	MPC · JPL
502738	2015 DF_{38}	—	September 24, 2008	Kitt Peak	Spacewatch	·	1.8 km	MPC · JPL
502739	2015 DP_{38}	—	November 29, 2013	Haleakala	Pan-STARRS 1	·	2.0 km	MPC · JPL
502740	2015 DH_{40}	—	May 8, 2006	Mount Lemmon	Mount Lemmon Survey	·	2.7 km	MPC · JPL
502741	2015 DR_{42}	—	November 19, 2009	Mount Lemmon	Mount Lemmon Survey	·	1.6 km	MPC · JPL
502742	2015 DX_{42}	—	March 20, 2010	Mount Lemmon	Mount Lemmon Survey	·	2.1 km	MPC · JPL
502743	2015 DU_{44}	—	October 22, 2008	Mount Lemmon	Mount Lemmon Survey	HOF	2.6 km	MPC · JPL
502744	2015 DW_{44}	—	October 29, 2008	Mount Lemmon	Mount Lemmon Survey	HOF	2.5 km	MPC · JPL
502745	2015 DM_{45}	—	December 31, 2008	Kitt Peak	Spacewatch	·	2.2 km	MPC · JPL
502746	2015 DX_{45}	—	October 7, 2005	Catalina	CSS	(5)	1.1 km	MPC · JPL
502747	2015 DZ_{45}	—	February 9, 2010	Mount Lemmon	Mount Lemmon Survey	·	2.2 km	MPC · JPL
502748	2015 DH_{46}	—	December 25, 2013	Mount Lemmon	Mount Lemmon Survey	·	1.8 km	MPC · JPL
502749	2015 DR_{46}	—	December 2, 2008	Kitt Peak	Spacewatch	·	2.4 km	MPC · JPL
502750	2015 DR_{48}	—	March 27, 2011	Mount Lemmon	Mount Lemmon Survey	·	2.0 km	MPC · JPL
502751	2015 DV_{48}	—	July 1, 2010	WISE	WISE	TIR	3.9 km	MPC · JPL
502752	2015 DV_{50}	—	April 9, 2002	Kitt Peak	Spacewatch	·	3.1 km	MPC · JPL
502753	2015 DM_{53}	—	April 2, 2005	Kitt Peak	Spacewatch	KOR	1.9 km	MPC · JPL
502754	2015 DN_{57}	—	August 19, 2006	Kitt Peak	Spacewatch	·	3.0 km	MPC · JPL
502755	2015 DQ_{58}	—	January 16, 2004	Kitt Peak	Spacewatch	·	2.2 km	MPC · JPL
502756	2015 DX_{58}	—	March 8, 2005	Mount Lemmon	Mount Lemmon Survey	·	2.0 km	MPC · JPL
502757	2015 DQ_{63}	—	March 4, 2006	Kitt Peak	Spacewatch	·	1.5 km	MPC · JPL
502758	2015 DN_{65}	—	March 20, 2010	Mount Lemmon	Mount Lemmon Survey	EOS	1.5 km	MPC · JPL
502759	2015 DH_{66}	—	October 22, 2006	Kitt Peak	Spacewatch	MAS	510 m	MPC · JPL
502760	2015 DE_{68}	—	November 26, 2009	Kitt Peak	Spacewatch	·	1.2 km	MPC · JPL
502761	2015 DT_{68}	—	July 21, 2006	Mount Lemmon	Mount Lemmon Survey	·	3.1 km	MPC · JPL
502762	2015 DW_{68}	—	November 25, 2005	Kitt Peak	Spacewatch	·	990 m	MPC · JPL
502763	2015 DZ_{69}	—	January 14, 2011	Kitt Peak	Spacewatch	·	1.0 km	MPC · JPL
502764	2015 DZ_{73}	—	January 6, 2010	Mount Lemmon	Mount Lemmon Survey	·	1.7 km	MPC · JPL
502765	2015 DQ_{74}	—	December 27, 2013	Mount Lemmon	Mount Lemmon Survey	·	2.6 km	MPC · JPL
502766	2015 DG_{76}	—	April 22, 2002	Kitt Peak	Spacewatch	·	1.7 km	MPC · JPL
502767	2015 DZ_{80}	—	April 14, 2010	Mount Lemmon	Mount Lemmon Survey	·	2.2 km	MPC · JPL
502768	2015 DL_{81}	—	December 31, 2008	Kitt Peak	Spacewatch	·	2.5 km	MPC · JPL
502769	2015 DO_{81}	—	March 15, 2010	Kitt Peak	Spacewatch	THB	3.4 km	MPC · JPL
502770	2015 DV_{81}	—	December 18, 2000	Kitt Peak	Spacewatch	·	1.5 km	MPC · JPL
502771	2015 DN_{82}	—	January 25, 2006	Kitt Peak	Spacewatch	·	1.4 km	MPC · JPL
502772	2015 DA_{83}	—	March 21, 2010	Kitt Peak	Spacewatch	·	2.5 km	MPC · JPL
502773	2015 DV_{83}	—	February 5, 2010	WISE	WISE	·	2.5 km	MPC · JPL
502774	2015 DF_{87}	—	September 22, 2008	Kitt Peak	Spacewatch	·	1.8 km	MPC · JPL
502775	2015 DB_{89}	—	October 9, 2013	Mount Lemmon	Mount Lemmon Survey	·	1.5 km	MPC · JPL
502776	2015 DD_{89}	—	February 8, 1999	Kitt Peak	Spacewatch	·	760 m	MPC · JPL
502777	2015 DX_{89}	—	September 29, 2005	Mount Lemmon	Mount Lemmon Survey	(5)	1.1 km	MPC · JPL
502778	2015 DR_{90}	—	March 15, 2010	Mount Lemmon	Mount Lemmon Survey	·	2.3 km	MPC · JPL
502779	2015 DD_{92}	—	September 11, 2007	Mount Lemmon	Mount Lemmon Survey	·	2.1 km	MPC · JPL
502780	2015 DX_{92}	—	February 27, 2006	Kitt Peak	Spacewatch	AGN	1.0 km	MPC · JPL
502781	2015 DO_{94}	—	December 21, 2008	Mount Lemmon	Mount Lemmon Survey	·	2.5 km	MPC · JPL
502782	2015 DC_{97}	—	September 29, 2008	Kitt Peak	Spacewatch	KOR	1.5 km	MPC · JPL
502783	2015 DK_{97}	—	October 6, 2008	Mount Lemmon	Mount Lemmon Survey	AGN	1.2 km	MPC · JPL
502784	2015 DQ_{97}	—	January 21, 2006	Kitt Peak	Spacewatch	·	2.1 km	MPC · JPL
502785	2015 DA_{98}	—	September 23, 2008	Mount Lemmon	Mount Lemmon Survey	·	2.3 km	MPC · JPL
502786	2015 DD_{98}	—	March 26, 2003	Kitt Peak	Spacewatch	MAR	1.1 km	MPC · JPL
502787	2015 DE_{98}	—	September 2, 2008	Kitt Peak	Spacewatch	·	1.5 km	MPC · JPL
502788	2015 DT_{98}	—	August 19, 2006	Kitt Peak	Spacewatch	EOS	2.0 km	MPC · JPL
502789	2015 DP_{99}	—	December 21, 2008	Mount Lemmon	Mount Lemmon Survey	·	1.6 km	MPC · JPL
502790	2015 DQ_{99}	—	March 23, 2006	Kitt Peak	Spacewatch	·	2.5 km	MPC · JPL
502791	2015 DX_{99}	—	November 9, 2009	Mount Lemmon	Mount Lemmon Survey	·	1.6 km	MPC · JPL
502792	2015 DY_{99}	—	April 7, 2005	Siding Spring	SSS	·	3.3 km	MPC · JPL
502793	2015 DF_{100}	—	June 17, 2010	WISE	WISE	·	2.5 km	MPC · JPL
502794	2015 DJ_{102}	—	November 25, 2005	Kitt Peak	Spacewatch	·	1.5 km	MPC · JPL
502795	2015 DR_{104}	—	September 25, 2013	Mount Lemmon	Mount Lemmon Survey	·	840 m	MPC · JPL
502796	2015 DJ_{105}	—	February 26, 2007	Mount Lemmon	Mount Lemmon Survey	·	2.0 km	MPC · JPL
502797	2015 DL_{105}	—	September 25, 2009	Kitt Peak	Spacewatch	(5)	1.2 km	MPC · JPL
502798	2015 DD_{107}	—	December 19, 2001	Kitt Peak	Spacewatch	·	1.7 km	MPC · JPL
502799	2015 DE_{107}	—	March 21, 2002	Kitt Peak	Spacewatch	·	2.3 km	MPC · JPL
502800	2015 DP_{107}	—	February 6, 2002	Socorro	LINEAR	·	2.1 km	MPC · JPL

== 502801–502900 ==
back to top

Designation			Discovery			Properties		Ref
Permanent	Provisional	Named after	Date	Site	Discoverer(s)	Category	Diam.	Ref
502801	2015 DZ_{108}	—	April 2, 2011	Mount Lemmon	Mount Lemmon Survey	·	1.6 km	MPC · JPL
502802	2015 DB_{109}	—	October 25, 2013	Mount Lemmon	Mount Lemmon Survey	·	1.9 km	MPC · JPL
502803	2015 DV_{110}	—	April 12, 2010	Mount Lemmon	Mount Lemmon Survey	·	3.1 km	MPC · JPL
502804	2015 DD_{111}	—	November 28, 2013	Mount Lemmon	Mount Lemmon Survey	·	2.4 km	MPC · JPL
502805	2015 DP_{111}	—	September 3, 2013	Haleakala	Pan-STARRS 1	·	930 m	MPC · JPL
502806	2015 DX_{111}	—	May 11, 2007	Mount Lemmon	Mount Lemmon Survey	·	1.7 km	MPC · JPL
502807	2015 DB_{112}	—	April 5, 2011	Kitt Peak	Spacewatch	·	1.7 km	MPC · JPL
502808	2015 DR_{112}	—	February 17, 2010	Catalina	CSS	EOS	2.9 km	MPC · JPL
502809	2015 DS_{112}	—	December 24, 2005	Kitt Peak	Spacewatch	·	1.8 km	MPC · JPL
502810	2015 DW_{112}	—	April 2, 2011	Mount Lemmon	Mount Lemmon Survey	BRA	1.5 km	MPC · JPL
502811	2015 DO_{117}	—	November 4, 2004	Kitt Peak	Spacewatch	·	1.9 km	MPC · JPL
502812	2015 DO_{118}	—	January 8, 2010	Mount Lemmon	Mount Lemmon Survey	·	2.6 km	MPC · JPL
502813	2015 DU_{119}	—	November 2, 2013	Mount Lemmon	Mount Lemmon Survey	·	1.6 km	MPC · JPL
502814	2015 DV_{120}	—	December 31, 2008	Mount Lemmon	Mount Lemmon Survey	EOS	1.8 km	MPC · JPL
502815	2015 DP_{121}	—	February 8, 2010	WISE	WISE	·	3.5 km	MPC · JPL
502816	2015 DZ_{122}	—	September 30, 2005	Mount Lemmon	Mount Lemmon Survey	·	1.1 km	MPC · JPL
502817	2015 DM_{123}	—	December 5, 2005	Kitt Peak	Spacewatch	·	1.4 km	MPC · JPL
502818	2015 DA_{127}	—	February 13, 2010	WISE	WISE	·	3.0 km	MPC · JPL
502819	2015 DM_{127}	—	February 5, 2011	Mount Lemmon	Mount Lemmon Survey	·	980 m	MPC · JPL
502820	2015 DK_{131}	—	February 16, 2010	Mount Lemmon	Mount Lemmon Survey	·	2.3 km	MPC · JPL
502821	2015 DC_{135}	—	September 14, 2004	Anderson Mesa	LONEOS	·	2.4 km	MPC · JPL
502822	2015 DU_{135}	—	December 12, 2004	Kitt Peak	Spacewatch	·	2.3 km	MPC · JPL
502823	2015 DM_{139}	—	January 26, 2006	Mount Lemmon	Mount Lemmon Survey	·	1.6 km	MPC · JPL
502824	2015 DH_{143}	—	September 2, 2010	Mount Lemmon	Mount Lemmon Survey	·	570 m	MPC · JPL
502825	2015 DK_{144}	—	December 11, 2001	Socorro	LINEAR	·	1.6 km	MPC · JPL
502826	2015 DA_{145}	—	February 21, 2007	Catalina	CSS	·	1.4 km	MPC · JPL
502827	2015 DG_{146}	—	March 17, 2005	Mount Lemmon	Mount Lemmon Survey	·	2.3 km	MPC · JPL
502828	2015 DJ_{148}	—	April 15, 2008	Mount Lemmon	Mount Lemmon Survey	·	1.1 km	MPC · JPL
502829	2015 DK_{148}	—	March 9, 2011	Mount Lemmon	Mount Lemmon Survey	·	2.1 km	MPC · JPL
502830	2015 DS_{149}	—	December 5, 2005	Kitt Peak	Spacewatch	·	1.7 km	MPC · JPL
502831	2015 DU_{149}	—	June 24, 2010	WISE	WISE	LIX	3.1 km	MPC · JPL
502832	2015 DD_{150}	—	September 16, 2004	Socorro	LINEAR	·	2.4 km	MPC · JPL
502833	2015 DQ_{151}	—	May 13, 2010	Mount Lemmon	Mount Lemmon Survey	·	2.5 km	MPC · JPL
502834	2015 DV_{151}	—	March 2, 2006	Mount Lemmon	Mount Lemmon Survey	PAD	3.8 km	MPC · JPL
502835	2015 DG_{152}	—	October 24, 2008	Mount Lemmon	Mount Lemmon Survey	·	1.8 km	MPC · JPL
502836	2015 DL_{152}	—	December 10, 2004	Kitt Peak	Spacewatch	·	1.9 km	MPC · JPL
502837	2015 DB_{153}	—	October 29, 2008	Mount Lemmon	Mount Lemmon Survey	HOF	2.5 km	MPC · JPL
502838	2015 DT_{153}	—	January 7, 2010	Kitt Peak	Spacewatch	·	2.3 km	MPC · JPL
502839	2015 DF_{154}	—	January 1, 2009	Kitt Peak	Spacewatch	·	2.3 km	MPC · JPL
502840	2015 DY_{155}	—	November 27, 2009	Mount Lemmon	Mount Lemmon Survey	·	1.7 km	MPC · JPL
502841	2015 DZ_{163}	—	February 13, 2010	Mount Lemmon	Mount Lemmon Survey	·	2.3 km	MPC · JPL
502842	2015 DR_{165}	—	November 7, 2007	Catalina	CSS	EOS	2.0 km	MPC · JPL
502843	2015 DB_{166}	—	February 18, 2015	Haleakala	Pan-STARRS 1	EOS	2.2 km	MPC · JPL
502844	2015 DF_{166}	—	February 1, 2006	Kitt Peak	Spacewatch	·	1.5 km	MPC · JPL
502845	2015 DW_{167}	—	October 6, 2008	Mount Lemmon	Mount Lemmon Survey	·	2.0 km	MPC · JPL
502846	2015 DX_{167}	—	September 26, 2006	Kitt Peak	Spacewatch	·	3.3 km	MPC · JPL
502847	2015 DZ_{169}	—	November 20, 2009	Kitt Peak	Spacewatch	·	2.8 km	MPC · JPL
502848	2015 DA_{171}	—	January 19, 2015	Haleakala	Pan-STARRS 1	HNS	1.0 km	MPC · JPL
502849	2015 DV_{172}	—	March 14, 2007	Mount Lemmon	Mount Lemmon Survey	·	2.2 km	MPC · JPL
502850	2015 DS_{173}	—	December 30, 2008	Kitt Peak	Spacewatch	EOS	2.0 km	MPC · JPL
502851	2015 DK_{175}	—	November 17, 2009	Mount Lemmon	Mount Lemmon Survey	·	1.9 km	MPC · JPL
502852	2015 DX_{176}	—	June 10, 2012	Haleakala	Pan-STARRS 1	·	1.7 km	MPC · JPL
502853	2015 DO_{178}	—	November 8, 2013	Catalina	CSS	·	3.2 km	MPC · JPL
502854	2015 DU_{179}	—	March 11, 2011	Mount Lemmon	Mount Lemmon Survey	·	1.6 km	MPC · JPL
502855	2015 DB_{180}	—	January 30, 2006	Catalina	CSS	·	2.4 km	MPC · JPL
502856	2015 DJ_{180}	—	October 20, 2006	Kitt Peak	Spacewatch	·	4.0 km	MPC · JPL
502857	2015 DL_{185}	—	September 14, 2007	Mount Lemmon	Mount Lemmon Survey	·	2.0 km	MPC · JPL
502858	2015 DF_{189}	—	April 10, 2010	Mount Lemmon	Mount Lemmon Survey	·	2.7 km	MPC · JPL
502859	2015 DD_{190}	—	November 24, 2008	Mount Lemmon	Mount Lemmon Survey	EOS	1.8 km	MPC · JPL
502860	2015 DX_{196}	—	February 7, 2002	Socorro	LINEAR	·	1.6 km	MPC · JPL
502861	2015 DA_{197}	—	February 15, 2010	Catalina	CSS	·	3.0 km	MPC · JPL
502862	2015 DV_{201}	—	February 12, 2004	Kitt Peak	Spacewatch	·	2.3 km	MPC · JPL
502863	2015 DL_{202}	—	January 19, 2005	Kitt Peak	Spacewatch	·	2.2 km	MPC · JPL
502864	2015 DM_{202}	—	January 16, 2010	Kitt Peak	Spacewatch	·	1.6 km	MPC · JPL
502865	2015 DT_{202}	—	September 16, 2012	Catalina	CSS	·	2.6 km	MPC · JPL
502866	2015 DU_{202}	—	October 8, 2012	Mount Lemmon	Mount Lemmon Survey	EOS	1.5 km	MPC · JPL
502867	2015 DH_{203}	—	January 15, 2010	Mount Lemmon	Mount Lemmon Survey	·	2.7 km	MPC · JPL
502868	2015 DE_{204}	—	September 29, 2003	Kitt Peak	Spacewatch	·	1.8 km	MPC · JPL
502869	2015 DK_{204}	—	January 31, 2009	Kitt Peak	Spacewatch	·	3.6 km	MPC · JPL
502870	2015 DE_{205}	—	October 8, 2012	Haleakala	Pan-STARRS 1	·	2.0 km	MPC · JPL
502871	2015 DX_{205}	—	August 28, 2006	Kitt Peak	Spacewatch	URS	3.2 km	MPC · JPL
502872	2015 DY_{205}	—	February 17, 2010	Mount Lemmon	Mount Lemmon Survey	·	1.9 km	MPC · JPL
502873	2015 DF_{207}	—	February 12, 2004	Kitt Peak	Spacewatch	EOS	1.9 km	MPC · JPL
502874	2015 DS_{207}	—	February 15, 2010	Catalina	CSS	·	2.4 km	MPC · JPL
502875	2015 DU_{209}	—	December 31, 2013	Kitt Peak	Spacewatch	EOS	1.9 km	MPC · JPL
502876	2015 DY_{209}	—	January 31, 2009	Mount Lemmon	Mount Lemmon Survey	·	1.5 km	MPC · JPL
502877	2015 DA_{210}	—	May 13, 2004	Kitt Peak	Spacewatch	·	2.7 km	MPC · JPL
502878	2015 DQ_{211}	—	February 23, 2015	Haleakala	Pan-STARRS 1	·	1.1 km	MPC · JPL
502879	2015 DY_{212}	—	March 16, 2004	Kitt Peak	Spacewatch	·	2.2 km	MPC · JPL
502880	2015 DZ_{212}	—	October 6, 2008	Mount Lemmon	Mount Lemmon Survey	·	1.7 km	MPC · JPL
502881	2015 DJ_{214}	—	August 18, 2006	Kitt Peak	Spacewatch	·	2.6 km	MPC · JPL
502882	2015 DO_{216}	—	November 20, 2007	Mount Lemmon	Mount Lemmon Survey	VER	2.7 km	MPC · JPL
502883	2015 DY_{216}	—	March 15, 2004	Kitt Peak	Spacewatch	·	2.7 km	MPC · JPL
502884	2015 DK_{217}	—	March 13, 2010	WISE	WISE	T_{j} (2.97)	3.3 km	MPC · JPL
502885	2015 DS_{217}	—	November 14, 2007	Kitt Peak	Spacewatch	·	2.8 km	MPC · JPL
502886	2015 DL_{219}	—	February 16, 2009	La Sagra	OAM	·	5.3 km	MPC · JPL
502887	2015 DD_{220}	—	October 8, 2007	Catalina	CSS	EOS	2.0 km	MPC · JPL
502888	2015 DO_{220}	—	September 19, 2012	Mount Lemmon	Mount Lemmon Survey	·	2.0 km	MPC · JPL
502889	2015 DU_{220}	—	March 12, 2011	Siding Spring	SSS	·	1.7 km	MPC · JPL
502890	2015 DX_{220}	—	October 9, 2012	Haleakala	Pan-STARRS 1	·	2.3 km	MPC · JPL
502891	2015 DC_{221}	—	August 28, 2006	Kitt Peak	Spacewatch	·	3.8 km	MPC · JPL
502892	2015 DJ_{222}	—	March 13, 2010	Kitt Peak	Spacewatch	·	2.6 km	MPC · JPL
502893	2015 DA_{223}	—	October 31, 2010	Kitt Peak	Spacewatch	L4	8.9 km	MPC · JPL
502894	2015 DD_{223}	—	January 20, 2015	Haleakala	Pan-STARRS 1	·	1.5 km	MPC · JPL
502895	2015 DL_{223}	—	November 18, 2006	Mount Lemmon	Mount Lemmon Survey	·	1.2 km	MPC · JPL
502896	2015 EH_{2}	—	November 24, 2009	Mount Lemmon	Mount Lemmon Survey	·	1.1 km	MPC · JPL
502897	2015 EL_{3}	—	March 11, 2007	Kitt Peak	Spacewatch	·	1.2 km	MPC · JPL
502898	2015 EA_{4}	—	August 28, 2006	Kitt Peak	Spacewatch	·	4.2 km	MPC · JPL
502899	2015 EW_{5}	—	September 13, 2007	Mount Lemmon	Mount Lemmon Survey	EOS	1.8 km	MPC · JPL
502900	2015 EH_{6}	—	April 4, 2011	Mount Lemmon	Mount Lemmon Survey	·	1.8 km	MPC · JPL

== 502901–503000 ==
back to top

Designation			Discovery			Properties		Ref
Permanent	Provisional	Named after	Date	Site	Discoverer(s)	Category	Diam.	Ref
502901	2015 EU_{7}	—	February 27, 2006	Catalina	CSS	·	2.6 km	MPC · JPL
502902	2015 EZ_{8}	—	October 15, 2007	Mount Lemmon	Mount Lemmon Survey	·	2.2 km	MPC · JPL
502903	2015 EB_{9}	—	February 1, 2005	Kitt Peak	Spacewatch	KOR	1.7 km	MPC · JPL
502904	2015 EL_{9}	—	September 3, 2008	Kitt Peak	Spacewatch	·	2.4 km	MPC · JPL
502905	2015 EP_{10}	—	March 20, 2007	Kitt Peak	Spacewatch	·	1.3 km	MPC · JPL
502906	2015 EA_{11}	—	October 7, 2004	Kitt Peak	Spacewatch	·	1.6 km	MPC · JPL
502907	2015 ES_{12}	—	September 18, 1995	Kitt Peak	Spacewatch	TIR	3.0 km	MPC · JPL
502908	2015 EV_{12}	—	October 3, 2013	Haleakala	Pan-STARRS 1	PAD	1.4 km	MPC · JPL
502909	2015 EY_{12}	—	November 14, 1998	Kitt Peak	Spacewatch	·	1.1 km	MPC · JPL
502910	2015 ET_{14}	—	November 29, 2013	Haleakala	Pan-STARRS 1	EOS	2.3 km	MPC · JPL
502911	2015 EK_{15}	—	February 24, 2006	Kitt Peak	Spacewatch	·	2.1 km	MPC · JPL
502912	2015 EW_{16}	—	November 24, 2009	Kitt Peak	Spacewatch	·	1.5 km	MPC · JPL
502913	2015 EB_{17}	—	January 14, 2010	WISE	WISE	·	2.1 km	MPC · JPL
502914	2015 EW_{17}	—	March 4, 2006	Kitt Peak	Spacewatch	GEF	1.0 km	MPC · JPL
502915	2015 ED_{18}	—	September 10, 2004	Kitt Peak	Spacewatch	·	1.9 km	MPC · JPL
502916	2015 EC_{19}	—	January 23, 2010	WISE	WISE	·	2.7 km	MPC · JPL
502917	2015 ED_{20}	—	August 21, 2006	Kitt Peak	Spacewatch	(7605)	2.5 km	MPC · JPL
502918	2015 EH_{20}	—	January 31, 2006	Mount Lemmon	Mount Lemmon Survey	PAD	1.6 km	MPC · JPL
502919	2015 EE_{22}	—	September 27, 2013	Haleakala	Pan-STARRS 1	·	1.5 km	MPC · JPL
502920	2015 EJ_{22}	—	March 19, 2010	Kitt Peak	Spacewatch	·	2.3 km	MPC · JPL
502921	2015 EX_{23}	—	November 5, 2007	Kitt Peak	Spacewatch	·	2.4 km	MPC · JPL
502922	2015 EK_{25}	—	February 2, 2006	Mount Lemmon	Mount Lemmon Survey	·	1.3 km	MPC · JPL
502923	2015 EO_{25}	—	August 26, 2012	Haleakala	Pan-STARRS 1	·	3.2 km	MPC · JPL
502924	2015 EM_{27}	—	September 2, 2008	Kitt Peak	Spacewatch	·	1.7 km	MPC · JPL
502925	2015 EZ_{27}	—	January 26, 2006	Kitt Peak	Spacewatch	·	1.7 km	MPC · JPL
502926	2015 EX_{29}	—	November 16, 1995	Kitt Peak	Spacewatch	·	1.9 km	MPC · JPL
502927	2015 EF_{30}	—	September 24, 2012	Mount Lemmon	Mount Lemmon Survey	·	3.0 km	MPC · JPL
502928	2015 EV_{30}	—	December 31, 2008	Kitt Peak	Spacewatch	·	2.4 km	MPC · JPL
502929	2015 EJ_{33}	—	February 24, 2006	Mount Lemmon	Mount Lemmon Survey	·	1.7 km	MPC · JPL
502930	2015 EP_{33}	—	January 7, 2010	Kitt Peak	Spacewatch	AGN	1.1 km	MPC · JPL
502931	2015 ET_{33}	—	January 11, 2010	Mount Lemmon	Mount Lemmon Survey	·	2.0 km	MPC · JPL
502932	2015 EX_{34}	—	November 9, 2008	Kitt Peak	Spacewatch	·	2.2 km	MPC · JPL
502933	2015 EG_{37}	—	November 11, 2004	Kitt Peak	Spacewatch	·	2.0 km	MPC · JPL
502934	2015 EF_{39}	—	April 1, 2011	Mount Lemmon	Mount Lemmon Survey	·	1.1 km	MPC · JPL
502935	2015 EL_{39}	—	February 27, 2006	Kitt Peak	Spacewatch	HOF	2.4 km	MPC · JPL
502936	2015 EB_{40}	—	February 16, 2010	Mount Lemmon	Mount Lemmon Survey	·	2.5 km	MPC · JPL
502937	2015 EO_{40}	—	March 11, 2007	Kitt Peak	Spacewatch	·	1.2 km	MPC · JPL
502938	2015 EQ_{44}	—	January 17, 2004	Kitt Peak	Spacewatch	·	2.2 km	MPC · JPL
502939	2015 EP_{45}	—	March 27, 2011	Mount Lemmon	Mount Lemmon Survey	·	1.6 km	MPC · JPL
502940	2015 EE_{46}	—	February 19, 2010	Mount Lemmon	Mount Lemmon Survey	·	1.6 km	MPC · JPL
502941	2015 EA_{47}	—	January 27, 2006	Mount Lemmon	Mount Lemmon Survey	·	1.5 km	MPC · JPL
502942	2015 EO_{51}	—	August 15, 2013	Haleakala	Pan-STARRS 1	·	1.0 km	MPC · JPL
502943	2015 EG_{52}	—	October 19, 2007	Kitt Peak	Spacewatch	·	2.7 km	MPC · JPL
502944	2015 EC_{54}	—	February 18, 2004	Kitt Peak	Spacewatch	·	3.4 km	MPC · JPL
502945	2015 ED_{55}	—	February 17, 2010	Kitt Peak	Spacewatch	EOS	2.7 km	MPC · JPL
502946	2015 EK_{57}	—	April 21, 1998	Socorro	LINEAR	T_{j} (2.98) · EUP	4.0 km	MPC · JPL
502947	2015 EP_{58}	—	November 23, 2003	Kitt Peak	Spacewatch	·	4.3 km	MPC · JPL
502948	2015 ER_{58}	—	April 30, 2004	Kitt Peak	Spacewatch	·	4.7 km	MPC · JPL
502949	2015 ED_{59}	—	January 22, 2006	Mount Lemmon	Mount Lemmon Survey	·	2.7 km	MPC · JPL
502950	2015 EF_{59}	—	November 10, 2009	Mount Lemmon	Mount Lemmon Survey	·	1.3 km	MPC · JPL
502951	2015 EU_{59}	—	February 22, 2006	Mount Lemmon	Mount Lemmon Survey	·	2.2 km	MPC · JPL
502952	2015 EB_{62}	—	February 1, 2006	Kitt Peak	Spacewatch	·	2.2 km	MPC · JPL
502953	2015 EE_{62}	—	March 3, 2006	Catalina	CSS	DOR	3.4 km	MPC · JPL
502954	2015 EW_{62}	—	October 3, 2003	Kitt Peak	Spacewatch	·	2.8 km	MPC · JPL
502955	2015 EY_{62}	—	April 30, 2006	Kitt Peak	Spacewatch	·	1.9 km	MPC · JPL
502956	2015 ES_{65}	—	January 19, 2004	Kitt Peak	Spacewatch	THM	2.0 km	MPC · JPL
502957	2015 EB_{66}	—	October 3, 2008	Mount Lemmon	Mount Lemmon Survey	HOF	3.0 km	MPC · JPL
502958	2015 EL_{66}	—	July 23, 2010	WISE	WISE	·	4.1 km	MPC · JPL
502959	2015 ED_{68}	—	February 27, 2006	Kitt Peak	Spacewatch	·	2.0 km	MPC · JPL
502960	2015 EO_{70}	—	December 13, 2004	Kitt Peak	Spacewatch	AGN	960 m	MPC · JPL
502961	2015 EF_{71}	—	January 14, 2011	Kitt Peak	Spacewatch	·	1.1 km	MPC · JPL
502962	2015 EJ_{71}	—	October 4, 2004	Kitt Peak	Spacewatch	·	1.4 km	MPC · JPL
502963	2015 EL_{71}	—	September 10, 2007	Mount Lemmon	Mount Lemmon Survey	·	1.5 km	MPC · JPL
502964	2015 EP_{72}	—	March 24, 2006	Kitt Peak	Spacewatch	·	3.0 km	MPC · JPL
502965	2015 EC_{73}	—	May 7, 2005	Mount Lemmon	Mount Lemmon Survey	·	2.4 km	MPC · JPL
502966	2015 FV_{1}	—	October 2, 2008	Mount Lemmon	Mount Lemmon Survey	·	1.9 km	MPC · JPL
502967	2015 FJ_{6}	—	August 10, 2008	La Sagra	OAM	MAR	1.2 km	MPC · JPL
502968	2015 FH_{8}	—	September 30, 2003	Kitt Peak	Spacewatch	·	600 m	MPC · JPL
502969	2015 FK_{12}	—	December 14, 2004	Kitt Peak	Spacewatch	·	2.1 km	MPC · JPL
502970	2015 FP_{17}	—	January 31, 2009	Mount Lemmon	Mount Lemmon Survey	EOS	2.2 km	MPC · JPL
502971	2015 FM_{21}	—	April 22, 1996	Kitt Peak	Spacewatch	·	3.1 km	MPC · JPL
502972	2015 FE_{39}	—	February 28, 2009	Kitt Peak	Spacewatch	·	2.6 km	MPC · JPL
502973	2015 FQ_{39}	—	March 3, 2006	Kitt Peak	Spacewatch	·	1.6 km	MPC · JPL
502974	2015 FA_{44}	—	September 27, 2005	Kitt Peak	Spacewatch	CYB	3.5 km	MPC · JPL
502975	2015 FZ_{44}	—	October 17, 2006	Kitt Peak	Spacewatch	VER	3.1 km	MPC · JPL
502976	2015 FC_{45}	—	September 27, 2006	Mount Lemmon	Mount Lemmon Survey	·	2.9 km	MPC · JPL
502977	2015 FP_{47}	—	January 13, 2010	WISE	WISE	·	4.8 km	MPC · JPL
502978	2015 FA_{51}	—	September 6, 2008	Kitt Peak	Spacewatch	HNS	1.2 km	MPC · JPL
502979	2015 FO_{56}	—	September 26, 2008	Mount Lemmon	Mount Lemmon Survey	·	1.8 km	MPC · JPL
502980	2015 FJ_{59}	—	May 7, 2005	Kitt Peak	Spacewatch	·	2.5 km	MPC · JPL
502981	2015 FA_{60}	—	October 31, 2013	Kitt Peak	Spacewatch	·	3.0 km	MPC · JPL
502982	2015 FQ_{66}	—	November 13, 2007	Kitt Peak	Spacewatch	·	2.8 km	MPC · JPL
502983	2015 FD_{72}	—	February 4, 2009	Mount Lemmon	Mount Lemmon Survey	·	2.7 km	MPC · JPL
502984	2015 FC_{73}	—	February 22, 2006	Catalina	CSS	(1547)	1.1 km	MPC · JPL
502985	2015 FG_{74}	—	October 8, 2012	Mount Lemmon	Mount Lemmon Survey	·	1.7 km	MPC · JPL
502986	2015 FQ_{74}	—	November 6, 2008	Mount Lemmon	Mount Lemmon Survey	·	1.9 km	MPC · JPL
502987	2015 FG_{75}	—	March 13, 2010	Catalina	CSS	·	1.7 km	MPC · JPL
502988	2015 FP_{75}	—	October 19, 2006	Mount Lemmon	Mount Lemmon Survey	·	3.4 km	MPC · JPL
502989	2015 FE_{76}	—	March 27, 2009	Mount Lemmon	Mount Lemmon Survey	·	3.5 km	MPC · JPL
502990	2015 FG_{76}	—	September 15, 2012	Mount Lemmon	Mount Lemmon Survey	·	2.1 km	MPC · JPL
502991	2015 FH_{76}	—	May 2, 2010	WISE	WISE	ADE	2.1 km	MPC · JPL
502992	2015 FH_{82}	—	December 3, 2013	Haleakala	Pan-STARRS 1	EOS	1.5 km	MPC · JPL
502993	2015 FA_{88}	—	August 28, 2006	Kitt Peak	Spacewatch	·	2.9 km	MPC · JPL
502994	2015 FM_{93}	—	July 30, 2008	Kitt Peak	Spacewatch	·	2.3 km	MPC · JPL
502995	2015 FD_{94}	—	December 4, 2008	Mount Lemmon	Mount Lemmon Survey	·	2.6 km	MPC · JPL
502996	2015 FG_{94}	—	November 2, 2007	Kitt Peak	Spacewatch	VER	2.4 km	MPC · JPL
502997	2015 FF_{95}	—	September 11, 2004	Socorro	LINEAR	·	1.7 km	MPC · JPL
502998	2015 FB_{96}	—	April 10, 2010	Kitt Peak	Spacewatch	·	2.3 km	MPC · JPL
502999	2015 FE_{96}	—	October 4, 1996	Kitt Peak	Spacewatch	·	3.2 km	MPC · JPL
503000	2015 FK_{96}	—	February 22, 2009	Kitt Peak	Spacewatch	·	2.9 km	MPC · JPL

back to top
