= List of minor planets: 460001–461000 =

The following is a partial list of minor planets, running from minor-planet number 460001 through 461000, inclusive. The primary data for this and other partial lists is based on JPL's "Small-Body Orbital Elements" and data available from the Minor Planet Center. Critical list information is also provided by the MPC, unless otherwise specified from Lowell Observatory. A detailed description of the table's columns and additional sources are given on the main page including a complete list of every page in this series, and a statistical break-up on the dynamical classification of minor planets.

Also see the summary list of all named bodies in numerical and alphabetical order, and the corresponding naming citations for the number range of this particular list. New namings may only be added to this list after official publication, as the preannouncement of names is condemned by the Working Group for Small Bodies Nomenclature of the International Astronomical Union.

Near-Earth obj.	MBA (inner)	MBA (outer)	Centaur
Mars-crosser	MBA (middle)	Jupiter trojan	Trans-Neptunian obj.
Unclassified

== 460001–460100 ==
Designation			Discovery			Properties		Ref
Permanent	Provisional	Named after	Date	Site	Discoverer(s)	Category	Diam.	Ref
460001	2014 OP_{92}	—	September 10, 2010	Mount Lemmon	Mount Lemmon Survey	·	2.2 km	MPC · JPL
460002	2014 OY_{92}	—	October 1, 2011	Kitt Peak	Spacewatch	V	550 m	MPC · JPL
460003	2014 OY_{101}	—	March 17, 2012	Mount Lemmon	Mount Lemmon Survey	EUN	1.2 km	MPC · JPL
460004	2014 OB_{102}	—	June 29, 2005	Kitt Peak	Spacewatch	EUN	1.1 km	MPC · JPL
460005	2014 OH_{103}	—	February 3, 2010	WISE	WISE	·	2.2 km	MPC · JPL
460006	2014 OE_{108}	—	November 17, 2006	Mount Lemmon	Mount Lemmon Survey	·	1.8 km	MPC · JPL
460007	2014 OZ_{108}	—	October 22, 2005	Kitt Peak	Spacewatch	·	550 m	MPC · JPL
460008	2014 OU_{111}	—	December 20, 2007	Mount Lemmon	Mount Lemmon Survey	H	640 m	MPC · JPL
460009	2014 OJ_{112}	—	July 26, 2008	Siding Spring	SSS	·	3.4 km	MPC · JPL
460010	2014 OK_{115}	—	November 5, 2007	Kitt Peak	Spacewatch	·	1.3 km	MPC · JPL
460011	2014 ON_{120}	—	September 10, 2004	Kitt Peak	Spacewatch	·	800 m	MPC · JPL
460012	2014 OQ_{120}	—	October 7, 2005	Kitt Peak	Spacewatch	·	570 m	MPC · JPL
460013	2014 OW_{120}	—	September 13, 2005	Kitt Peak	Spacewatch	AGN	880 m	MPC · JPL
460014	2014 OS_{124}	—	December 26, 2005	Mount Lemmon	Mount Lemmon Survey	·	2.5 km	MPC · JPL
460015	2014 OB_{128}	—	May 8, 2006	Mount Lemmon	Mount Lemmon Survey	·	1.1 km	MPC · JPL
460016	2014 OX_{136}	—	February 28, 2008	Kitt Peak	Spacewatch	·	1.5 km	MPC · JPL
460017	2014 OV_{137}	—	November 21, 2006	Mount Lemmon	Mount Lemmon Survey	·	1.6 km	MPC · JPL
460018	2014 OX_{138}	—	September 4, 2010	Mount Lemmon	Mount Lemmon Survey	·	1.1 km	MPC · JPL
460019	2014 OG_{139}	—	November 8, 2007	Kitt Peak	Spacewatch	NYS	1.1 km	MPC · JPL
460020	2014 OL_{139}	—	September 14, 2007	Mount Lemmon	Mount Lemmon Survey	NYS	1.0 km	MPC · JPL
460021	2014 OL_{140}	—	September 18, 2006	Kitt Peak	Spacewatch	·	870 m	MPC · JPL
460022	2014 OZ_{141}	—	October 3, 2010	Kitt Peak	Spacewatch	·	1.2 km	MPC · JPL
460023	2014 OZ_{142}	—	March 14, 2013	Kitt Peak	Spacewatch	·	1.5 km	MPC · JPL
460024	2014 OX_{150}	—	September 5, 1999	Kitt Peak	Spacewatch	MAS	560 m	MPC · JPL
460025	2014 OR_{151}	—	December 27, 2011	Kitt Peak	Spacewatch	·	2.1 km	MPC · JPL
460026	2014 OL_{164}	—	October 22, 2006	Kitt Peak	Spacewatch	·	1.3 km	MPC · JPL
460027	2014 OA_{165}	—	September 27, 2009	Mount Lemmon	Mount Lemmon Survey	·	2.5 km	MPC · JPL
460028	2014 OH_{165}	—	May 8, 2010	Mount Lemmon	Mount Lemmon Survey	·	590 m	MPC · JPL
460029	2014 OR_{168}	—	October 20, 2008	Kitt Peak	Spacewatch	·	750 m	MPC · JPL
460030	2014 OY_{169}	—	October 21, 2011	Kitt Peak	Spacewatch	V	480 m	MPC · JPL
460031	2014 OG_{171}	—	September 30, 2010	Mount Lemmon	Mount Lemmon Survey	MRX	930 m	MPC · JPL
460032	2014 OR_{171}	—	November 23, 2006	Mount Lemmon	Mount Lemmon Survey	·	1.5 km	MPC · JPL
460033	2014 OA_{173}	—	October 20, 2006	Mount Lemmon	Mount Lemmon Survey	·	1.7 km	MPC · JPL
460034	2014 OG_{177}	—	December 14, 2004	Kitt Peak	Spacewatch	·	790 m	MPC · JPL
460035	2014 OJ_{181}	—	November 2, 2006	Catalina	CSS	·	1.1 km	MPC · JPL
460036	2014 OE_{184}	—	December 4, 2010	Mount Lemmon	Mount Lemmon Survey	·	1.6 km	MPC · JPL
460037	2014 OK_{186}	—	September 25, 2005	Kitt Peak	Spacewatch	·	1.4 km	MPC · JPL
460038	2014 OK_{187}	—	November 7, 2010	Mount Lemmon	Mount Lemmon Survey	·	1.5 km	MPC · JPL
460039	2014 OO_{187}	—	August 28, 2009	Kitt Peak	Spacewatch	·	2.1 km	MPC · JPL
460040	2014 OX_{187}	—	October 11, 2010	Mount Lemmon	Mount Lemmon Survey	·	1.4 km	MPC · JPL
460041	2014 OG_{188}	—	November 22, 2005	Kitt Peak	Spacewatch	·	1.7 km	MPC · JPL
460042	2014 OH_{189}	—	September 23, 2009	Mount Lemmon	Mount Lemmon Survey	·	1.9 km	MPC · JPL
460043	2014 OE_{191}	—	August 28, 2005	Kitt Peak	Spacewatch	·	1.4 km	MPC · JPL
460044	2014 OD_{192}	—	July 30, 2010	WISE	WISE	·	2.4 km	MPC · JPL
460045	2014 OL_{192}	—	July 1, 2014	Mount Lemmon	Mount Lemmon Survey	·	3.7 km	MPC · JPL
460046	2014 OS_{193}	—	January 30, 2009	Mount Lemmon	Mount Lemmon Survey	V	510 m	MPC · JPL
460047	2014 OZ_{194}	—	September 10, 2007	Kitt Peak	Spacewatch	·	850 m	MPC · JPL
460048	2014 OC_{196}	—	September 4, 1999	Kitt Peak	Spacewatch	·	920 m	MPC · JPL
460049	2014 OL_{197}	—	December 19, 2009	Catalina	CSS	·	3.8 km	MPC · JPL
460050	2014 OO_{197}	—	July 30, 2010	WISE	WISE	·	1.6 km	MPC · JPL
460051	2014 OU_{197}	—	January 28, 2010	WISE	WISE	·	3.4 km	MPC · JPL
460052	2014 OC_{199}	—	May 20, 2013	Siding Spring	SSS	EUN	1.7 km	MPC · JPL
460053	2014 OH_{199}	—	January 25, 2006	Kitt Peak	Spacewatch	·	740 m	MPC · JPL
460054	2014 OE_{200}	—	September 12, 2007	Catalina	CSS	NYS	970 m	MPC · JPL
460055	2014 OL_{200}	—	October 20, 2007	Mount Lemmon	Mount Lemmon Survey	V	600 m	MPC · JPL
460056	2014 OX_{202}	—	October 18, 2003	Kitt Peak	Spacewatch	·	930 m	MPC · JPL
460057	2014 OP_{203}	—	December 20, 2004	Mount Lemmon	Mount Lemmon Survey	·	970 m	MPC · JPL
460058	2014 OU_{203}	—	October 18, 2001	Socorro	LINEAR	·	2.2 km	MPC · JPL
460059	2014 OU_{204}	—	September 15, 2004	Anderson Mesa	LONEOS	·	700 m	MPC · JPL
460060	2014 OZ_{213}	—	January 15, 2009	Kitt Peak	Spacewatch	·	930 m	MPC · JPL
460061	2014 OA_{220}	—	October 29, 2011	Kitt Peak	Spacewatch	·	840 m	MPC · JPL
460062	2014 OP_{223}	—	December 4, 2007	Mount Lemmon	Mount Lemmon Survey	·	1.2 km	MPC · JPL
460063	2014 OS_{225}	—	October 31, 2010	Mount Lemmon	Mount Lemmon Survey	·	1.8 km	MPC · JPL
460064	2014 OZ_{226}	—	October 8, 2004	Kitt Peak	Spacewatch	·	760 m	MPC · JPL
460065	2014 OF_{229}	—	October 26, 2009	Kitt Peak	Spacewatch	·	1.9 km	MPC · JPL
460066	2014 OR_{229}	—	December 14, 2003	Kitt Peak	Spacewatch	THM	2.3 km	MPC · JPL
460067	2014 OB_{230}	—	September 17, 2009	Kitt Peak	Spacewatch	·	3.2 km	MPC · JPL
460068	2014 OY_{233}	—	January 20, 2009	Kitt Peak	Spacewatch	·	960 m	MPC · JPL
460069	2014 OA_{240}	—	September 11, 2007	Mount Lemmon	Mount Lemmon Survey	·	700 m	MPC · JPL
460070	2014 OJ_{241}	—	May 11, 2010	Mount Lemmon	Mount Lemmon Survey	·	850 m	MPC · JPL
460071	2014 OH_{242}	—	November 3, 2008	Kitt Peak	Spacewatch	·	530 m	MPC · JPL
460072	2014 OT_{251}	—	August 16, 2009	Kitt Peak	Spacewatch	·	2.5 km	MPC · JPL
460073	2014 OV_{262}	—	December 22, 2008	Kitt Peak	Spacewatch	·	1.2 km	MPC · JPL
460074	2014 OR_{295}	—	May 18, 2010	WISE	WISE	PHO	2.5 km	MPC · JPL
460075	2014 OU_{295}	—	August 31, 2005	Kitt Peak	Spacewatch	·	1.3 km	MPC · JPL
460076	2014 OO_{296}	—	November 10, 2009	Kitt Peak	Spacewatch	THM	2.0 km	MPC · JPL
460077	2014 OS_{297}	—	February 26, 2007	Mount Lemmon	Mount Lemmon Survey	·	2.0 km	MPC · JPL
460078	2014 OZ_{297}	—	January 25, 2007	Kitt Peak	Spacewatch	·	2.0 km	MPC · JPL
460079	2014 OG_{298}	—	March 11, 2002	Kitt Peak	Spacewatch	·	1.1 km	MPC · JPL
460080	2014 OT_{306}	—	April 11, 2010	Kitt Peak	Spacewatch	·	1.3 km	MPC · JPL
460081	2014 OO_{323}	—	November 10, 2004	Kitt Peak	Spacewatch	·	680 m	MPC · JPL
460082	2014 OB_{334}	—	September 7, 2000	Kitt Peak	Spacewatch	·	2.3 km	MPC · JPL
460083	2014 OD_{336}	—	January 18, 2008	Mount Lemmon	Mount Lemmon Survey	·	1.3 km	MPC · JPL
460084	2014 OE_{341}	—	December 24, 2005	Kitt Peak	Spacewatch	·	1.5 km	MPC · JPL
460085	2014 OT_{341}	—	May 17, 2010	WISE	WISE	·	1.5 km	MPC · JPL
460086	2014 OS_{343}	—	January 2, 2012	Kitt Peak	Spacewatch	·	1.4 km	MPC · JPL
460087	2014 OK_{358}	—	February 2, 2005	Kitt Peak	Spacewatch	·	4.0 km	MPC · JPL
460088	2014 OM_{373}	—	September 18, 2003	Kitt Peak	Spacewatch	MAS	590 m	MPC · JPL
460089	2014 OU_{376}	—	March 13, 2013	Kitt Peak	Spacewatch	·	1.7 km	MPC · JPL
460090	2014 OB_{379}	—	November 6, 2010	Mount Lemmon	Mount Lemmon Survey	·	1.7 km	MPC · JPL
460091	2014 OA_{381}	—	October 7, 2004	Kitt Peak	Spacewatch	·	1.4 km	MPC · JPL
460092	2014 OD_{384}	—	September 25, 2006	Catalina	CSS	H	540 m	MPC · JPL
460093	2014 OT_{387}	—	January 27, 2012	Kitt Peak	Spacewatch	·	1.7 km	MPC · JPL
460094	2014 OP_{390}	—	October 15, 2004	Mount Lemmon	Mount Lemmon Survey	THM	1.9 km	MPC · JPL
460095	2014 ON_{391}	—	October 28, 2005	Catalina	CSS	·	1.8 km	MPC · JPL
460096	2014 PA	—	April 9, 1996	Kitt Peak	Spacewatch	·	1.3 km	MPC · JPL
460097	2014 PD	—	January 30, 2006	Kitt Peak	Spacewatch	·	2.9 km	MPC · JPL
460098	2014 PJ	—	October 8, 2007	Catalina	CSS	·	1.2 km	MPC · JPL
460099	2014 PG_{2}	—	September 12, 2009	Kitt Peak	Spacewatch	THM	1.9 km	MPC · JPL
460100	2014 PH_{5}	—	August 10, 2004	Campo Imperatore	CINEOS	·	680 m	MPC · JPL

== 460101–460200 ==
back to top

Designation			Discovery			Properties		Ref
Permanent	Provisional	Named after	Date	Site	Discoverer(s)	Category	Diam.	Ref
460101	2014 PY_{6}	—	September 3, 2010	Mount Lemmon	Mount Lemmon Survey	·	2.0 km	MPC · JPL
460102	2014 PD_{7}	—	January 13, 2010	WISE	WISE	LIX	2.6 km	MPC · JPL
460103	2014 PW_{8}	—	September 5, 2010	Mount Lemmon	Mount Lemmon Survey	·	930 m	MPC · JPL
460104	2014 PJ_{9}	—	February 7, 2008	Kitt Peak	Spacewatch	EUN	850 m	MPC · JPL
460105	2014 PO_{9}	—	December 27, 1999	Kitt Peak	Spacewatch	·	2.4 km	MPC · JPL
460106	2014 PP_{12}	—	September 23, 2006	Kitt Peak	Spacewatch	·	870 m	MPC · JPL
460107	2014 PG_{13}	—	January 27, 2011	Mount Lemmon	Mount Lemmon Survey	·	2.3 km	MPC · JPL
460108	2014 PG_{17}	—	October 17, 2010	Mount Lemmon	Mount Lemmon Survey	·	940 m	MPC · JPL
460109	2014 PR_{17}	—	December 16, 1999	Kitt Peak	Spacewatch	·	620 m	MPC · JPL
460110	2014 PA_{21}	—	November 7, 2007	Kitt Peak	Spacewatch	·	1.2 km	MPC · JPL
460111	2014 PN_{23}	—	September 14, 2007	Mount Lemmon	Mount Lemmon Survey	NYS	920 m	MPC · JPL
460112	2014 PK_{24}	—	January 26, 2007	Kitt Peak	Spacewatch	·	2.7 km	MPC · JPL
460113	2014 PC_{25}	—	October 4, 2010	Socorro	LINEAR	·	1.2 km	MPC · JPL
460114	2014 PX_{26}	—	February 14, 2009	Mount Lemmon	Mount Lemmon Survey	V	630 m	MPC · JPL
460115	2014 PN_{28}	—	September 12, 2007	Mount Lemmon	Mount Lemmon Survey	·	840 m	MPC · JPL
460116	2014 PY_{28}	—	August 14, 2010	Kitt Peak	Spacewatch	RAF	760 m	MPC · JPL
460117	2014 PD_{29}	—	September 16, 2009	Catalina	CSS	·	4.2 km	MPC · JPL
460118	2014 PE_{29}	—	October 11, 2010	Mount Lemmon	Mount Lemmon Survey	HOF	2.5 km	MPC · JPL
460119	2014 PV_{29}	—	October 17, 2003	Kitt Peak	Spacewatch	MAS	770 m	MPC · JPL
460120	2014 PE_{32}	—	November 12, 2010	Mount Lemmon	Mount Lemmon Survey	HOF	2.2 km	MPC · JPL
460121	2014 PB_{33}	—	October 2, 2010	Kitt Peak	Spacewatch	·	1.2 km	MPC · JPL
460122	2014 PG_{35}	—	October 6, 1999	Kitt Peak	Spacewatch	NYS	990 m	MPC · JPL
460123	2014 PH_{36}	—	October 14, 1998	Kitt Peak	Spacewatch	·	840 m	MPC · JPL
460124	2014 PS_{36}	—	April 25, 2010	WISE	WISE	PHO	1.0 km	MPC · JPL
460125	2014 PN_{39}	—	October 17, 2011	Kitt Peak	Spacewatch	·	520 m	MPC · JPL
460126	2014 PL_{40}	—	October 28, 2005	Kitt Peak	Spacewatch	·	2.0 km	MPC · JPL
460127	2014 PM_{40}	—	March 31, 2010	WISE	WISE	CYB	3.3 km	MPC · JPL
460128	2014 PR_{40}	—	August 18, 2009	Kitt Peak	Spacewatch	EOS	1.8 km	MPC · JPL
460129	2014 PJ_{41}	—	January 25, 2011	Kitt Peak	Spacewatch	·	2.5 km	MPC · JPL
460130	2014 PH_{42}	—	February 10, 2008	Kitt Peak	Spacewatch	EUN	1.1 km	MPC · JPL
460131	2014 PW_{43}	—	April 30, 2009	Kitt Peak	Spacewatch	·	1.8 km	MPC · JPL
460132	2014 PN_{44}	—	October 7, 2004	Kitt Peak	Spacewatch	·	920 m	MPC · JPL
460133	2014 PG_{45}	—	January 31, 2006	Kitt Peak	Spacewatch	·	580 m	MPC · JPL
460134	2014 PJ_{48}	—	January 19, 2012	Mount Lemmon	Mount Lemmon Survey	·	1.3 km	MPC · JPL
460135	2014 PF_{49}	—	March 6, 2008	Catalina	CSS	·	1.7 km	MPC · JPL
460136	2014 PN_{50}	—	January 10, 2007	Kitt Peak	Spacewatch	·	1.3 km	MPC · JPL
460137	2014 PB_{54}	—	September 15, 2010	Kitt Peak	Spacewatch	·	2.4 km	MPC · JPL
460138	2014 PH_{54}	—	March 19, 2010	WISE	WISE	·	3.2 km	MPC · JPL
460139	2014 PR_{54}	—	May 7, 2010	Mount Lemmon	Mount Lemmon Survey	·	590 m	MPC · JPL
460140	2014 PW_{54}	—	November 14, 2007	Mount Lemmon	Mount Lemmon Survey	V	690 m	MPC · JPL
460141	2014 PB_{55}	—	August 11, 1997	Kitt Peak	Spacewatch	THB	2.4 km	MPC · JPL
460142	2014 PF_{55}	—	October 19, 2003	Kitt Peak	Spacewatch	·	1.1 km	MPC · JPL
460143	2014 PE_{56}	—	February 4, 2009	Mount Lemmon	Mount Lemmon Survey	V	610 m	MPC · JPL
460144	2014 PA_{57}	—	July 9, 2010	WISE	WISE	·	3.7 km	MPC · JPL
460145	2014 PL_{57}	—	November 17, 2009	Catalina	CSS	·	1.9 km	MPC · JPL
460146	2014 PL_{58}	—	September 8, 2004	Socorro	LINEAR	·	620 m	MPC · JPL
460147	2014 PO_{59}	—	March 7, 2013	Kitt Peak	Spacewatch	·	2.6 km	MPC · JPL
460148	2014 PF_{63}	—	May 7, 2010	Mount Lemmon	Mount Lemmon Survey	NYS	1.2 km	MPC · JPL
460149	2014 PJ_{64}	—	June 7, 2008	Kitt Peak	Spacewatch	·	2.9 km	MPC · JPL
460150	2014 PR_{65}	—	June 28, 2011	Mount Lemmon	Mount Lemmon Survey	·	600 m	MPC · JPL
460151	2014 PE_{66}	—	September 18, 2010	Mount Lemmon	Mount Lemmon Survey	·	1.5 km	MPC · JPL
460152	2014 PY_{68}	—	October 29, 2010	Mount Lemmon	Mount Lemmon Survey	·	1.7 km	MPC · JPL
460153	2014 PR_{69}	—	September 3, 2007	Siding Spring	SSS	·	940 m	MPC · JPL
460154	2014 QQ	—	April 1, 2010	WISE	WISE	PHO	1.1 km	MPC · JPL
460155	2014 QG_{1}	—	December 31, 2007	Kitt Peak	Spacewatch	·	1.9 km	MPC · JPL
460156	2014 QL_{1}	—	October 14, 2010	Mount Lemmon	Mount Lemmon Survey	·	1.1 km	MPC · JPL
460157	2014 QX_{1}	—	November 21, 2009	Mount Lemmon	Mount Lemmon Survey	THB	3.8 km	MPC · JPL
460158	2014 QF_{20}	—	February 10, 2008	Kitt Peak	Spacewatch	·	1.2 km	MPC · JPL
460159	2014 QN_{20}	—	September 13, 2007	Catalina	CSS	·	800 m	MPC · JPL
460160	2014 QN_{21}	—	January 27, 2010	WISE	WISE	·	3.4 km	MPC · JPL
460161	2014 QS_{21}	—	January 18, 2012	Kitt Peak	Spacewatch	·	1.1 km	MPC · JPL
460162	2014 QY_{21}	—	January 31, 2010	WISE	WISE	·	2.9 km	MPC · JPL
460163	2014 QF_{22}	—	November 11, 2007	Mount Lemmon	Mount Lemmon Survey	·	1.4 km	MPC · JPL
460164	2014 QQ_{23}	—	December 25, 2005	Kitt Peak	Spacewatch	EOS	2.1 km	MPC · JPL
460165	2014 QW_{23}	—	October 2, 2009	Mount Lemmon	Mount Lemmon Survey	·	2.4 km	MPC · JPL
460166	2014 QY_{24}	—	July 18, 2010	WISE	WISE	·	3.7 km	MPC · JPL
460167	2014 QC_{27}	—	October 31, 2006	Kitt Peak	Spacewatch	·	1.0 km	MPC · JPL
460168	2014 QP_{27}	—	September 29, 1997	Kitt Peak	Spacewatch	·	2.7 km	MPC · JPL
460169	2014 QZ_{27}	—	June 30, 2014	Mount Lemmon	Mount Lemmon Survey	·	1.2 km	MPC · JPL
460170	2014 QX_{29}	—	September 30, 1995	Kitt Peak	Spacewatch	·	1.2 km	MPC · JPL
460171	2014 QC_{30}	—	November 5, 1999	Kitt Peak	Spacewatch	T_{j} (2.99) · 3:2	4.3 km	MPC · JPL
460172	2014 QK_{30}	—	August 19, 2001	Socorro	LINEAR	·	2.0 km	MPC · JPL
460173	2014 QP_{30}	—	January 1, 2008	Mount Lemmon	Mount Lemmon Survey	PHO	1.1 km	MPC · JPL
460174	2014 QG_{31}	—	December 5, 2005	Kitt Peak	Spacewatch	·	2.1 km	MPC · JPL
460175	2014 QU_{31}	—	June 14, 2007	Kitt Peak	Spacewatch	·	3.1 km	MPC · JPL
460176	2014 QX_{36}	—	August 29, 2006	Kitt Peak	Spacewatch	·	960 m	MPC · JPL
460177	2014 QJ_{38}	—	October 29, 1994	Kitt Peak	Spacewatch	EOS	1.6 km	MPC · JPL
460178	2014 QG_{45}	—	March 11, 2002	Kitt Peak	Spacewatch	·	1.0 km	MPC · JPL
460179	2014 QL_{59}	—	May 17, 2010	WISE	WISE	·	2.1 km	MPC · JPL
460180	2014 QF_{64}	—	September 8, 2007	Mount Lemmon	Mount Lemmon Survey	V	570 m	MPC · JPL
460181	2014 QL_{65}	—	January 1, 2012	Mount Lemmon	Mount Lemmon Survey	·	930 m	MPC · JPL
460182	2014 QF_{75}	—	December 26, 2011	Kitt Peak	Spacewatch	·	1.5 km	MPC · JPL
460183	2014 QQ_{77}	—	September 10, 2007	Catalina	CSS	·	780 m	MPC · JPL
460184	2014 QK_{90}	—	January 17, 2005	Socorro	LINEAR	·	2.4 km	MPC · JPL
460185	2014 QS_{117}	—	March 29, 2009	Mount Lemmon	Mount Lemmon Survey	·	680 m	MPC · JPL
460186	2014 QL_{119}	—	October 16, 1995	Kitt Peak	Spacewatch	NYS	1.1 km	MPC · JPL
460187	2014 QP_{120}	—	October 1, 2005	Catalina	CSS	·	1.6 km	MPC · JPL
460188	2014 QK_{121}	—	September 17, 2006	Kitt Peak	Spacewatch	·	960 m	MPC · JPL
460189	2014 QS_{128}	—	March 4, 2006	Mount Lemmon	Mount Lemmon Survey	·	700 m	MPC · JPL
460190	2014 QL_{130}	—	March 29, 2012	Mount Lemmon	Mount Lemmon Survey	·	2.6 km	MPC · JPL
460191	2014 QJ_{133}	—	September 28, 2006	Mount Lemmon	Mount Lemmon Survey	·	1.1 km	MPC · JPL
460192	2014 QC_{135}	—	March 4, 2006	Kitt Peak	Spacewatch	·	2.7 km	MPC · JPL
460193	2014 QP_{135}	—	September 1, 2005	Kitt Peak	Spacewatch	·	1.4 km	MPC · JPL
460194	2014 QE_{136}	—	March 13, 2012	Mount Lemmon	Mount Lemmon Survey	KOR	1.4 km	MPC · JPL
460195	2014 QH_{137}	—	November 15, 2006	Catalina	CSS	·	1.3 km	MPC · JPL
460196	2014 QR_{137}	—	April 29, 2009	Kitt Peak	Spacewatch	·	950 m	MPC · JPL
460197	2014 QY_{137}	—	April 4, 2010	Kitt Peak	Spacewatch	·	530 m	MPC · JPL
460198	2014 QY_{139}	—	February 8, 2008	Kitt Peak	Spacewatch	·	950 m	MPC · JPL
460199	2014 QJ_{140}	—	February 4, 2011	Catalina	CSS	·	2.6 km	MPC · JPL
460200	2014 QM_{141}	—	September 28, 2006	Kitt Peak	Spacewatch	·	1.0 km	MPC · JPL

== 460201–460300 ==
back to top

Designation			Discovery			Properties		Ref
Permanent	Provisional	Named after	Date	Site	Discoverer(s)	Category	Diam.	Ref
460201	2014 QR_{145}	—	October 22, 2011	Mount Lemmon	Mount Lemmon Survey	·	530 m	MPC · JPL
460202	2014 QT_{148}	—	April 2, 2010	WISE	WISE	T_{j} (2.98)	2.0 km	MPC · JPL
460203	2014 QM_{149}	—	October 27, 2005	Kitt Peak	Spacewatch	KOR	1.3 km	MPC · JPL
460204	2014 QY_{149}	—	October 2, 2006	Mount Lemmon	Mount Lemmon Survey	·	940 m	MPC · JPL
460205	2014 QM_{150}	—	October 8, 2007	Mount Lemmon	Mount Lemmon Survey	·	920 m	MPC · JPL
460206	2014 QB_{164}	—	September 5, 2007	Catalina	CSS	·	1.4 km	MPC · JPL
460207	2014 QO_{166}	—	July 28, 2006	Siding Spring	SSS	H	520 m	MPC · JPL
460208	2014 QU_{167}	—	December 13, 2006	Kitt Peak	Spacewatch	·	2.3 km	MPC · JPL
460209	2014 QX_{169}	—	January 12, 2010	WISE	WISE	·	2.0 km	MPC · JPL
460210	2014 QE_{170}	—	April 14, 2008	Mount Lemmon	Mount Lemmon Survey	NEM	2.5 km	MPC · JPL
460211	2014 QL_{170}	—	September 15, 2007	Kitt Peak	Spacewatch	·	860 m	MPC · JPL
460212	2014 QN_{171}	—	March 26, 2008	Mount Lemmon	Mount Lemmon Survey	·	1.5 km	MPC · JPL
460213	2014 QN_{172}	—	February 24, 2010	WISE	WISE	THB	2.1 km	MPC · JPL
460214	2014 QY_{172}	—	October 15, 2007	Mount Lemmon	Mount Lemmon Survey	·	1.2 km	MPC · JPL
460215	2014 QZ_{173}	—	September 5, 2010	Mount Lemmon	Mount Lemmon Survey	·	900 m	MPC · JPL
460216	2014 QX_{176}	—	September 18, 2010	Mount Lemmon	Mount Lemmon Survey	·	1.2 km	MPC · JPL
460217	2014 QY_{187}	—	September 12, 2001	Kitt Peak	Spacewatch	·	1.4 km	MPC · JPL
460218	2014 QO_{194}	—	September 28, 2003	Apache Point	SDSS	·	2.4 km	MPC · JPL
460219	2014 QF_{204}	—	September 28, 2003	Kitt Peak	Spacewatch	HYG	2.1 km	MPC · JPL
460220	2014 QJ_{205}	—	August 10, 2010	Kitt Peak	Spacewatch	(5)	1.2 km	MPC · JPL
460221	2014 QM_{205}	—	February 8, 2008	Mount Lemmon	Mount Lemmon Survey	·	760 m	MPC · JPL
460222	2014 QU_{205}	—	September 27, 2003	Kitt Peak	Spacewatch	·	2.2 km	MPC · JPL
460223	2014 QU_{213}	—	April 5, 2008	Mount Lemmon	Mount Lemmon Survey	HOF	2.1 km	MPC · JPL
460224	2014 QX_{214}	—	March 28, 2008	Mount Lemmon	Mount Lemmon Survey	·	1.7 km	MPC · JPL
460225	2014 QM_{216}	—	January 15, 2009	Kitt Peak	Spacewatch	·	850 m	MPC · JPL
460226	2014 QK_{218}	—	August 31, 2005	Kitt Peak	Spacewatch	·	1.6 km	MPC · JPL
460227	2014 QT_{218}	—	September 16, 2009	Mount Lemmon	Mount Lemmon Survey	·	1.3 km	MPC · JPL
460228	2014 QP_{221}	—	June 21, 2014	Mount Lemmon	Mount Lemmon Survey	V	660 m	MPC · JPL
460229	2014 QJ_{223}	—	August 21, 2006	Kitt Peak	Spacewatch	·	1.2 km	MPC · JPL
460230	2014 QO_{228}	—	September 7, 2004	Kitt Peak	Spacewatch	KOR	1.1 km	MPC · JPL
460231	2014 QQ_{229}	—	August 29, 2005	Kitt Peak	Spacewatch	·	1.6 km	MPC · JPL
460232	2014 QY_{232}	—	December 9, 2006	Kitt Peak	Spacewatch	MIS	2.4 km	MPC · JPL
460233	2014 QZ_{235}	—	November 16, 1995	Kitt Peak	Spacewatch	·	1.7 km	MPC · JPL
460234	2014 QL_{237}	—	October 23, 2009	Mount Lemmon	Mount Lemmon Survey	THM	1.9 km	MPC · JPL
460235	2014 QB_{240}	—	August 12, 1997	Kitt Peak	Spacewatch	·	730 m	MPC · JPL
460236	2014 QG_{248}	—	September 30, 2010	Mount Lemmon	Mount Lemmon Survey	WIT	940 m	MPC · JPL
460237	2014 QV_{252}	—	January 26, 2006	Kitt Peak	Spacewatch	·	3.0 km	MPC · JPL
460238	2014 QU_{255}	—	February 7, 2008	Mount Lemmon	Mount Lemmon Survey	·	1.3 km	MPC · JPL
460239	2014 QL_{256}	—	May 7, 2008	Mount Lemmon	Mount Lemmon Survey	·	2.1 km	MPC · JPL
460240	2014 QC_{258}	—	November 6, 2010	Mount Lemmon	Mount Lemmon Survey	GEF	1.1 km	MPC · JPL
460241	2014 QW_{261}	—	January 13, 2011	Mount Lemmon	Mount Lemmon Survey	·	2.7 km	MPC · JPL
460242	2014 QE_{262}	—	December 17, 2009	Mount Lemmon	Mount Lemmon Survey	·	2.4 km	MPC · JPL
460243	2014 QN_{262}	—	February 14, 2010	WISE	WISE	·	4.4 km	MPC · JPL
460244	2014 QR_{267}	—	February 4, 2005	Kitt Peak	Spacewatch	·	1.3 km	MPC · JPL
460245	2014 QS_{267}	—	June 27, 2010	WISE	WISE	KON	2.3 km	MPC · JPL
460246	2014 QM_{270}	—	March 4, 2005	Mount Lemmon	Mount Lemmon Survey	·	1.1 km	MPC · JPL
460247	2014 QS_{270}	—	September 6, 2008	Catalina	CSS	·	3.0 km	MPC · JPL
460248	2014 QV_{273}	—	May 12, 2007	Kitt Peak	Spacewatch	·	3.2 km	MPC · JPL
460249	2014 QY_{275}	—	January 10, 2007	Kitt Peak	Spacewatch	·	1.6 km	MPC · JPL
460250	2014 QG_{276}	—	December 29, 2011	Kitt Peak	Spacewatch	·	930 m	MPC · JPL
460251	2014 QT_{276}	—	January 18, 2012	Mount Lemmon	Mount Lemmon Survey	·	1.5 km	MPC · JPL
460252	2014 QB_{277}	—	November 7, 2007	Mount Lemmon	Mount Lemmon Survey	·	1.0 km	MPC · JPL
460253	2014 QD_{278}	—	October 22, 2009	Mount Lemmon	Mount Lemmon Survey	THM	2.1 km	MPC · JPL
460254	2014 QG_{278}	—	September 21, 2011	Kitt Peak	Spacewatch	·	550 m	MPC · JPL
460255	2014 QL_{279}	—	December 31, 2007	Mount Lemmon	Mount Lemmon Survey	·	850 m	MPC · JPL
460256	2014 QT_{283}	—	September 27, 2009	Mount Lemmon	Mount Lemmon Survey	·	2.5 km	MPC · JPL
460257	2014 QQ_{284}	—	November 1, 2006	Mount Lemmon	Mount Lemmon Survey	·	1.5 km	MPC · JPL
460258	2014 QO_{285}	—	January 2, 2012	Catalina	CSS	EUN	1.4 km	MPC · JPL
460259	2014 QP_{294}	—	September 13, 2005	Catalina	CSS	·	2.0 km	MPC · JPL
460260	2014 QF_{300}	—	October 12, 2007	Mount Lemmon	Mount Lemmon Survey	·	1.0 km	MPC · JPL
460261	2014 QD_{301}	—	November 3, 2010	Kitt Peak	Spacewatch	·	1.9 km	MPC · JPL
460262	2014 QJ_{304}	—	December 25, 2010	Kitt Peak	Spacewatch	·	2.6 km	MPC · JPL
460263	2014 QT_{307}	—	September 11, 2010	Mount Lemmon	Mount Lemmon Survey	·	1.2 km	MPC · JPL
460264	2014 QD_{309}	—	November 1, 2010	Kitt Peak	Spacewatch	·	1.8 km	MPC · JPL
460265	2014 QJ_{312}	—	February 2, 2008	Mount Lemmon	Mount Lemmon Survey	·	1.3 km	MPC · JPL
460266	2014 QM_{313}	—	October 3, 2006	Mount Lemmon	Mount Lemmon Survey	·	1.0 km	MPC · JPL
460267	2014 QM_{314}	—	May 3, 2008	Kitt Peak	Spacewatch	EOS	1.4 km	MPC · JPL
460268	2014 QG_{316}	—	October 18, 2006	Kitt Peak	Spacewatch	·	1.4 km	MPC · JPL
460269	2014 QC_{317}	—	February 25, 2006	Kitt Peak	Spacewatch	·	770 m	MPC · JPL
460270	2014 QK_{323}	—	October 6, 2005	Mount Lemmon	Mount Lemmon Survey	·	1.7 km	MPC · JPL
460271	2014 QR_{323}	—	November 30, 2005	Kitt Peak	Spacewatch	KOR	1.1 km	MPC · JPL
460272	2014 QN_{324}	—	March 25, 2006	Kitt Peak	Spacewatch	·	1.0 km	MPC · JPL
460273	2014 QV_{325}	—	October 10, 2005	Kitt Peak	Spacewatch	·	2.0 km	MPC · JPL
460274	2014 QW_{325}	—	January 4, 2012	Mount Lemmon	Mount Lemmon Survey	·	1.1 km	MPC · JPL
460275	2014 QX_{329}	—	December 30, 2005	Kitt Peak	Spacewatch	·	1.8 km	MPC · JPL
460276	2014 QB_{333}	—	March 26, 2007	Kitt Peak	Spacewatch	·	2.2 km	MPC · JPL
460277	2014 QE_{337}	—	February 11, 2012	Mount Lemmon	Mount Lemmon Survey	EUN	1.0 km	MPC · JPL
460278	2014 QH_{340}	—	December 28, 2005	Kitt Peak	Spacewatch	·	2.0 km	MPC · JPL
460279	2014 QU_{343}	—	October 8, 2004	Kitt Peak	Spacewatch	·	800 m	MPC · JPL
460280	2014 QK_{346}	—	August 5, 2010	WISE	WISE	·	1.8 km	MPC · JPL
460281	2014 QZ_{347}	—	November 16, 2006	Mount Lemmon	Mount Lemmon Survey	·	1.1 km	MPC · JPL
460282	2014 QU_{351}	—	September 20, 2006	Kitt Peak	Spacewatch	3:2	5.3 km	MPC · JPL
460283	2014 QL_{354}	—	December 21, 2005	Kitt Peak	Spacewatch	KOR	1.3 km	MPC · JPL
460284	2014 QW_{354}	—	February 17, 2007	Mount Lemmon	Mount Lemmon Survey	·	1.4 km	MPC · JPL
460285	2014 QU_{355}	—	November 23, 2011	Mount Lemmon	Mount Lemmon Survey	·	660 m	MPC · JPL
460286	2014 QP_{356}	—	September 16, 2003	Kitt Peak	Spacewatch	·	3.2 km	MPC · JPL
460287	2014 QU_{356}	—	November 6, 2010	Mount Lemmon	Mount Lemmon Survey	·	1.5 km	MPC · JPL
460288	2014 QC_{357}	—	December 31, 2008	Kitt Peak	Spacewatch	·	1.1 km	MPC · JPL
460289	2014 QF_{358}	—	November 3, 2005	Catalina	CSS	·	1.6 km	MPC · JPL
460290	2014 QQ_{358}	—	November 26, 2005	Mount Lemmon	Mount Lemmon Survey	KOR	1.2 km	MPC · JPL
460291	2014 QY_{359}	—	September 28, 2003	Kitt Peak	Spacewatch	THM	2.1 km	MPC · JPL
460292	2014 QQ_{360}	—	September 13, 2005	Kitt Peak	Spacewatch	·	1.6 km	MPC · JPL
460293	2014 QR_{361}	—	May 1, 2009	Mount Lemmon	Mount Lemmon Survey	EUN	1.1 km	MPC · JPL
460294	2014 QC_{367}	—	October 25, 2005	Kitt Peak	Spacewatch	·	1.8 km	MPC · JPL
460295	2014 QL_{367}	—	December 19, 2004	Mount Lemmon	Mount Lemmon Survey	·	2.4 km	MPC · JPL
460296	2014 QQ_{367}	—	November 13, 2007	Mount Lemmon	Mount Lemmon Survey	·	1.5 km	MPC · JPL
460297	2014 QV_{369}	—	November 23, 2006	Kitt Peak	Spacewatch	·	1.5 km	MPC · JPL
460298	2014 QK_{370}	—	November 22, 2005	Kitt Peak	Spacewatch	·	2.1 km	MPC · JPL
460299	2014 QP_{370}	—	September 17, 2009	Mount Lemmon	Mount Lemmon Survey	·	2.0 km	MPC · JPL
460300	2014 QH_{371}	—	September 10, 2007	Kitt Peak	Spacewatch	V	660 m	MPC · JPL

== 460301–460400 ==
back to top

Designation			Discovery			Properties		Ref
Permanent	Provisional	Named after	Date	Site	Discoverer(s)	Category	Diam.	Ref
460301	2014 QM_{371}	—	October 18, 2006	Kitt Peak	Spacewatch	·	1.1 km	MPC · JPL
460302	2014 QP_{371}	—	October 12, 2007	Mount Lemmon	Mount Lemmon Survey	·	1.6 km	MPC · JPL
460303	2014 QZ_{371}	—	October 17, 2010	Mount Lemmon	Mount Lemmon Survey	·	1.2 km	MPC · JPL
460304	2014 QF_{373}	—	October 5, 2003	Kitt Peak	Spacewatch	V	660 m	MPC · JPL
460305	2014 QL_{373}	—	January 22, 2006	Mount Lemmon	Mount Lemmon Survey	·	2.7 km	MPC · JPL
460306	2014 QO_{375}	—	February 21, 2009	Mount Lemmon	Mount Lemmon Survey	·	770 m	MPC · JPL
460307	2014 QW_{377}	—	August 4, 2008	Siding Spring	SSS	·	3.1 km	MPC · JPL
460308	2014 QK_{378}	—	October 26, 2005	Kitt Peak	Spacewatch	·	1.8 km	MPC · JPL
460309	2014 QN_{379}	—	October 3, 2003	Kitt Peak	Spacewatch	·	2.3 km	MPC · JPL
460310	2014 QU_{380}	—	April 3, 2000	Kitt Peak	Spacewatch	·	690 m	MPC · JPL
460311	2014 QY_{385}	—	November 15, 2010	Mount Lemmon	Mount Lemmon Survey	·	1.3 km	MPC · JPL
460312	2014 QU_{389}	—	November 13, 2010	Mount Lemmon	Mount Lemmon Survey	·	1.4 km	MPC · JPL
460313	2014 QF_{396}	—	February 19, 2009	Kitt Peak	Spacewatch	·	1.1 km	MPC · JPL
460314	2014 QU_{396}	—	July 31, 2008	Mount Lemmon	Mount Lemmon Survey	·	2.4 km	MPC · JPL
460315	2014 QF_{397}	—	November 25, 2005	Mount Lemmon	Mount Lemmon Survey	·	1.6 km	MPC · JPL
460316	2014 QL_{406}	—	January 7, 2005	Kitt Peak	Spacewatch	·	920 m	MPC · JPL
460317	2014 QE_{407}	—	February 17, 2007	Kitt Peak	Spacewatch	KOR	1.3 km	MPC · JPL
460318	2014 QL_{412}	—	October 2, 2006	Mount Lemmon	Mount Lemmon Survey	·	1.1 km	MPC · JPL
460319	2014 QV_{412}	—	August 29, 2005	Kitt Peak	Spacewatch	·	1.3 km	MPC · JPL
460320	2014 QE_{413}	—	December 30, 2008	Mount Lemmon	Mount Lemmon Survey	·	600 m	MPC · JPL
460321	2014 QH_{413}	—	December 26, 2011	Kitt Peak	Spacewatch	NYS	850 m	MPC · JPL
460322	2014 QR_{414}	—	April 28, 2008	Mount Lemmon	Mount Lemmon Survey	·	1.5 km	MPC · JPL
460323	2014 QK_{416}	—	February 24, 2006	Mount Lemmon	Mount Lemmon Survey	·	1.4 km	MPC · JPL
460324	2014 QV_{417}	—	August 29, 2005	Kitt Peak	Spacewatch	NEM	2.2 km	MPC · JPL
460325	2014 QA_{418}	—	June 26, 2005	Mount Lemmon	Mount Lemmon Survey	·	1.5 km	MPC · JPL
460326	2014 QB_{418}	—	May 21, 2012	Mount Lemmon	Mount Lemmon Survey	3:2	6.3 km	MPC · JPL
460327	2014 QO_{419}	—	November 19, 2003	Kitt Peak	Spacewatch	·	1.1 km	MPC · JPL
460328	2014 QG_{422}	—	March 27, 2008	Mount Lemmon	Mount Lemmon Survey	·	1.3 km	MPC · JPL
460329	2014 QQ_{422}	—	September 6, 2010	Kitt Peak	Spacewatch	·	1.1 km	MPC · JPL
460330	2014 QG_{431}	—	October 23, 2005	Catalina	CSS	·	2.2 km	MPC · JPL
460331	2014 QJ_{431}	—	July 12, 2005	Mount Lemmon	Mount Lemmon Survey	·	1.6 km	MPC · JPL
460332	2014 QK_{432}	—	September 27, 2000	Socorro	LINEAR	·	2.4 km	MPC · JPL
460333	2014 QY_{438}	—	November 17, 2009	Kitt Peak	Spacewatch	·	2.7 km	MPC · JPL
460334	2014 RW	—	October 13, 2010	Kitt Peak	Spacewatch	·	1.5 km	MPC · JPL
460335	2014 RE_{5}	—	December 14, 2004	Kitt Peak	Spacewatch	·	2.0 km	MPC · JPL
460336	2014 RR_{6}	—	September 11, 2010	Mount Lemmon	Mount Lemmon Survey	KON	1.9 km	MPC · JPL
460337	2014 RS_{6}	—	April 3, 2008	Mount Lemmon	Mount Lemmon Survey	·	1.5 km	MPC · JPL
460338	2014 RC_{7}	—	October 24, 2009	Kitt Peak	Spacewatch	VER	2.2 km	MPC · JPL
460339	2014 RJ_{10}	—	September 20, 2003	Kitt Peak	Spacewatch	·	3.2 km	MPC · JPL
460340	2014 RP_{11}	—	September 27, 2003	Socorro	LINEAR	·	4.3 km	MPC · JPL
460341	2014 RC_{16}	—	October 20, 2003	Socorro	LINEAR	THB	2.8 km	MPC · JPL
460342	2014 RR_{21}	—	December 5, 1999	Kitt Peak	Spacewatch	MAS	820 m	MPC · JPL
460343	2014 RM_{22}	—	November 10, 2005	Catalina	CSS	DOR	2.1 km	MPC · JPL
460344	2014 RN_{23}	—	September 11, 2010	Kitt Peak	Spacewatch	·	1.2 km	MPC · JPL
460345	2014 RG_{24}	—	February 16, 2009	Kitt Peak	Spacewatch	·	780 m	MPC · JPL
460346	2014 RM_{25}	—	November 19, 2003	Campo Imperatore	CINEOS	·	1.1 km	MPC · JPL
460347	2014 RD_{32}	—	July 16, 2010	WISE	WISE	·	1.9 km	MPC · JPL
460348	2014 RH_{32}	—	October 17, 2006	Catalina	CSS	EUN	1.2 km	MPC · JPL
460349	2014 RQ_{33}	—	October 13, 2007	Kitt Peak	Spacewatch	·	1.2 km	MPC · JPL
460350	2014 RM_{35}	—	April 17, 2009	Mount Lemmon	Mount Lemmon Survey	·	1.7 km	MPC · JPL
460351	2014 RK_{40}	—	November 20, 2001	Socorro	LINEAR	·	870 m	MPC · JPL
460352	2014 RM_{40}	—	June 22, 2007	Kitt Peak	Spacewatch	·	990 m	MPC · JPL
460353	2014 RP_{42}	—	September 26, 2005	Kitt Peak	Spacewatch	·	1.6 km	MPC · JPL
460354	2014 RU_{43}	—	February 28, 2008	Catalina	CSS	·	2.7 km	MPC · JPL
460355	2014 RW_{44}	—	September 6, 1997	Caussols	ODAS	·	1.1 km	MPC · JPL
460356	2014 RH_{45}	—	November 20, 2006	Kitt Peak	Spacewatch	·	1.1 km	MPC · JPL
460357	2014 RU_{45}	—	November 10, 2010	Mount Lemmon	Mount Lemmon Survey	·	1.0 km	MPC · JPL
460358	2014 RW_{45}	—	September 19, 2008	Kitt Peak	Spacewatch	·	3.3 km	MPC · JPL
460359	2014 RE_{47}	—	June 21, 2010	Mount Lemmon	Mount Lemmon Survey	·	1.0 km	MPC · JPL
460360	2014 RA_{48}	—	September 19, 2001	Socorro	LINEAR	·	1.5 km	MPC · JPL
460361	2014 RD_{61}	—	February 3, 2008	Mount Lemmon	Mount Lemmon Survey	H	520 m	MPC · JPL
460362	2014 RF_{61}	—	September 28, 2003	Anderson Mesa	LONEOS	V	780 m	MPC · JPL
460363	2014 RK_{61}	—	December 24, 2011	Mount Lemmon	Mount Lemmon Survey	·	970 m	MPC · JPL
460364	2014 RT_{61}	—	August 18, 2007	Anderson Mesa	LONEOS	·	720 m	MPC · JPL
460365	2014 RC_{62}	—	August 15, 2009	Catalina	CSS	·	2.8 km	MPC · JPL
460366	2014 SD_{2}	—	January 9, 2007	Mount Lemmon	Mount Lemmon Survey	·	1.4 km	MPC · JPL
460367	2014 SO_{9}	—	May 4, 2005	Mount Lemmon	Mount Lemmon Survey	·	1.3 km	MPC · JPL
460368	2014 SD_{12}	—	July 5, 2005	Mount Lemmon	Mount Lemmon Survey	·	1.2 km	MPC · JPL
460369	2014 SJ_{13}	—	November 11, 2010	Mount Lemmon	Mount Lemmon Survey	·	1.3 km	MPC · JPL
460370	2014 SQ_{15}	—	October 16, 2006	Kitt Peak	Spacewatch	·	1.1 km	MPC · JPL
460371	2014 SZ_{19}	—	October 9, 2010	Mount Lemmon	Mount Lemmon Survey	·	1.4 km	MPC · JPL
460372	2014 SB_{21}	—	February 19, 2009	Kitt Peak	Spacewatch	·	1.2 km	MPC · JPL
460373	2014 SL_{21}	—	October 18, 2009	Mount Lemmon	Mount Lemmon Survey	THM	1.8 km	MPC · JPL
460374	2014 SJ_{27}	—	March 29, 2008	Mount Lemmon	Mount Lemmon Survey	·	1.4 km	MPC · JPL
460375	2014 SW_{27}	—	December 14, 2010	Mount Lemmon	Mount Lemmon Survey	·	1.4 km	MPC · JPL
460376	2014 SR_{29}	—	November 7, 2010	Kitt Peak	Spacewatch	·	1.3 km	MPC · JPL
460377	2014 SH_{31}	—	February 29, 2008	Kitt Peak	Spacewatch	·	1.0 km	MPC · JPL
460378	2014 SL_{31}	—	October 2, 2006	Mount Lemmon	Mount Lemmon Survey	·	1.0 km	MPC · JPL
460379	2014 SR_{31}	—	November 11, 2010	Mount Lemmon	Mount Lemmon Survey	·	1.4 km	MPC · JPL
460380	2014 SK_{37}	—	September 28, 2006	Kitt Peak	Spacewatch	·	1.0 km	MPC · JPL
460381	2014 SK_{42}	—	November 1, 2005	Catalina	CSS	GEF	1.2 km	MPC · JPL
460382	2014 SG_{43}	—	January 16, 2011	Mount Lemmon	Mount Lemmon Survey	EOS	2.1 km	MPC · JPL
460383	2014 ST_{43}	—	November 19, 2007	Mount Lemmon	Mount Lemmon Survey	·	940 m	MPC · JPL
460384	2014 SB_{57}	—	February 9, 2008	Mount Lemmon	Mount Lemmon Survey	·	1.0 km	MPC · JPL
460385	2014 SJ_{59}	—	January 29, 2012	Kitt Peak	Spacewatch	MAR	930 m	MPC · JPL
460386	2014 SF_{64}	—	October 30, 2010	Mount Lemmon	Mount Lemmon Survey	·	1.3 km	MPC · JPL
460387	2014 SN_{64}	—	March 31, 2013	Mount Lemmon	Mount Lemmon Survey	·	940 m	MPC · JPL
460388	2014 SS_{64}	—	November 19, 2007	Mount Lemmon	Mount Lemmon Survey	·	1.1 km	MPC · JPL
460389	2014 ST_{65}	—	November 15, 2007	Mount Lemmon	Mount Lemmon Survey	·	1.1 km	MPC · JPL
460390	2014 SQ_{79}	—	November 20, 2003	Kitt Peak	Spacewatch	·	1.2 km	MPC · JPL
460391	2014 SW_{81}	—	October 10, 2005	Kitt Peak	Spacewatch	·	1.8 km	MPC · JPL
460392	2014 SD_{84}	—	March 11, 2005	Mount Lemmon	Mount Lemmon Survey	·	1.3 km	MPC · JPL
460393	2014 SH_{85}	—	October 17, 2010	Mount Lemmon	Mount Lemmon Survey	MIS	2.9 km	MPC · JPL
460394	2014 SB_{87}	—	September 9, 2007	Kitt Peak	Spacewatch	·	840 m	MPC · JPL
460395	2014 SD_{88}	—	April 24, 2000	Kitt Peak	Spacewatch	·	1.3 km	MPC · JPL
460396	2014 SN_{88}	—	January 13, 2004	Kitt Peak	Spacewatch	·	2.4 km	MPC · JPL
460397	2014 SP_{88}	—	January 26, 2006	Mount Lemmon	Mount Lemmon Survey	·	3.0 km	MPC · JPL
460398	2014 SC_{93}	—	December 5, 2005	Mount Lemmon	Mount Lemmon Survey	·	1.9 km	MPC · JPL
460399	2014 SW_{95}	—	May 13, 2004	Kitt Peak	Spacewatch	·	1.6 km	MPC · JPL
460400	2014 SC_{97}	—	September 10, 2010	Kitt Peak	Spacewatch	·	1.2 km	MPC · JPL

== 460401–460500 ==
back to top

Designation			Discovery			Properties		Ref
Permanent	Provisional	Named after	Date	Site	Discoverer(s)	Category	Diam.	Ref
460401	2014 SG_{97}	—	February 25, 2008	Mount Lemmon	Mount Lemmon Survey	·	1.2 km	MPC · JPL
460402	2014 SB_{102}	—	May 3, 2000	Kitt Peak	Spacewatch	·	690 m	MPC · JPL
460403	2014 SU_{106}	—	September 4, 2003	Kitt Peak	Spacewatch	·	810 m	MPC · JPL
460404	2014 SL_{111}	—	January 22, 2006	Mount Lemmon	Mount Lemmon Survey	·	1.4 km	MPC · JPL
460405	2014 SD_{114}	—	December 24, 2006	Kitt Peak	Spacewatch	·	1.4 km	MPC · JPL
460406	2014 SG_{116}	—	October 5, 2004	Kitt Peak	Spacewatch	KOR	1.5 km	MPC · JPL
460407	2014 SM_{117}	—	October 31, 2005	Kitt Peak	Spacewatch	HOF	2.8 km	MPC · JPL
460408	2014 SU_{117}	—	December 16, 2007	Mount Lemmon	Mount Lemmon Survey	·	1.0 km	MPC · JPL
460409	2014 ST_{118}	—	February 25, 2012	Kitt Peak	Spacewatch	·	1.7 km	MPC · JPL
460410	2014 SY_{118}	—	September 22, 2003	Kitt Peak	Spacewatch	THM	2.1 km	MPC · JPL
460411	2014 SO_{119}	—	February 28, 2008	Kitt Peak	Spacewatch	·	1.3 km	MPC · JPL
460412	2014 SS_{123}	—	October 13, 2007	Mount Lemmon	Mount Lemmon Survey	·	940 m	MPC · JPL
460413	2014 SW_{123}	—	September 11, 2007	Mount Lemmon	Mount Lemmon Survey	·	630 m	MPC · JPL
460414	2014 SD_{124}	—	October 17, 2009	Mount Lemmon	Mount Lemmon Survey	·	1.4 km	MPC · JPL
460415	2014 SW_{126}	—	May 18, 2013	Mount Lemmon	Mount Lemmon Survey	·	1.0 km	MPC · JPL
460416	2014 SW_{131}	—	September 22, 2009	Kitt Peak	Spacewatch	·	1.3 km	MPC · JPL
460417	2014 SF_{132}	—	March 9, 2005	Mount Lemmon	Mount Lemmon Survey	·	2.6 km	MPC · JPL
460418	2014 SO_{135}	—	March 28, 2010	WISE	WISE	·	3.6 km	MPC · JPL
460419	2014 SL_{141}	—	February 25, 2012	Kitt Peak	Spacewatch	·	3.0 km	MPC · JPL
460420	2014 SA_{142}	—	March 16, 2013	Catalina	CSS	PHO	1.1 km	MPC · JPL
460421	2014 SN_{146}	—	September 25, 2005	Kitt Peak	Spacewatch	·	1.8 km	MPC · JPL
460422	2014 SZ_{153}	—	March 1, 2008	Kitt Peak	Spacewatch	·	1.4 km	MPC · JPL
460423	2014 SG_{154}	—	November 3, 2005	Mount Lemmon	Mount Lemmon Survey	·	1.7 km	MPC · JPL
460424	2014 SH_{154}	—	October 11, 2007	Mount Lemmon	Mount Lemmon Survey	·	1.1 km	MPC · JPL
460425	2014 ST_{154}	—	February 1, 2009	Kitt Peak	Spacewatch	V	620 m	MPC · JPL
460426	2014 SP_{155}	—	November 30, 2005	Kitt Peak	Spacewatch	·	1.5 km	MPC · JPL
460427	2014 SJ_{156}	—	September 15, 2004	Kitt Peak	Spacewatch	KOR	1.2 km	MPC · JPL
460428	2014 SS_{157}	—	March 26, 2003	Kitt Peak	Spacewatch	·	2.0 km	MPC · JPL
460429	2014 SY_{157}	—	October 21, 2001	Kitt Peak	Spacewatch	·	1.2 km	MPC · JPL
460430	2014 SJ_{158}	—	October 1, 2008	Mount Lemmon	Mount Lemmon Survey	·	3.7 km	MPC · JPL
460431	2014 SG_{159}	—	February 27, 2006	Mount Lemmon	Mount Lemmon Survey	EOS	1.7 km	MPC · JPL
460432	2014 SA_{160}	—	October 30, 2009	Mount Lemmon	Mount Lemmon Survey	·	2.6 km	MPC · JPL
460433	2014 SO_{160}	—	October 12, 2010	Mount Lemmon	Mount Lemmon Survey	MAR	1.0 km	MPC · JPL
460434	2014 SS_{161}	—	October 13, 2007	Kitt Peak	Spacewatch	·	1.0 km	MPC · JPL
460435	2014 SE_{163}	—	January 27, 2007	Kitt Peak	Spacewatch	·	1.9 km	MPC · JPL
460436	2014 SG_{165}	—	September 10, 2004	Kitt Peak	Spacewatch	·	2.0 km	MPC · JPL
460437	2014 SC_{166}	—	February 20, 2010	WISE	WISE	·	3.2 km	MPC · JPL
460438	2014 SR_{166}	—	October 21, 2003	Kitt Peak	Spacewatch	V	640 m	MPC · JPL
460439	2014 SO_{167}	—	October 8, 2001	Palomar	NEAT	·	1.6 km	MPC · JPL
460440	2014 SA_{172}	—	August 29, 2005	Kitt Peak	Spacewatch	·	1.7 km	MPC · JPL
460441	2014 SJ_{175}	—	October 11, 2010	Kitt Peak	Spacewatch	·	1.0 km	MPC · JPL
460442	2014 SL_{179}	—	February 28, 2008	Kitt Peak	Spacewatch	·	1.5 km	MPC · JPL
460443	2014 SV_{183}	—	October 16, 2007	Mount Lemmon	Mount Lemmon Survey	·	1.4 km	MPC · JPL
460444	2014 ST_{188}	—	May 9, 2006	Mount Lemmon	Mount Lemmon Survey	·	920 m	MPC · JPL
460445	2014 SZ_{188}	—	December 1, 2006	Mount Lemmon	Mount Lemmon Survey	·	1.5 km	MPC · JPL
460446	2014 ST_{189}	—	December 3, 2010	Kitt Peak	Spacewatch	·	1.5 km	MPC · JPL
460447	2014 ST_{208}	—	January 8, 2002	Kitt Peak	Spacewatch	·	2.5 km	MPC · JPL
460448	2014 SK_{210}	—	November 2, 2010	Kitt Peak	Spacewatch	·	1.7 km	MPC · JPL
460449	2014 SD_{211}	—	January 31, 2006	Kitt Peak	Spacewatch	·	3.3 km	MPC · JPL
460450	2014 SE_{213}	—	January 12, 2010	Kitt Peak	Spacewatch	·	2.6 km	MPC · JPL
460451	2014 SF_{214}	—	April 29, 2012	Kitt Peak	Spacewatch	BRA	1.6 km	MPC · JPL
460452	2014 SH_{215}	—	November 4, 2005	Mount Lemmon	Mount Lemmon Survey	·	2.5 km	MPC · JPL
460453	2014 SV_{218}	—	May 7, 2002	Anderson Mesa	LONEOS	PHO	1.2 km	MPC · JPL
460454	2014 SX_{218}	—	November 16, 2009	Mount Lemmon	Mount Lemmon Survey	·	2.2 km	MPC · JPL
460455	2014 SP_{226}	—	October 17, 1995	Kitt Peak	Spacewatch	·	1.2 km	MPC · JPL
460456	2014 SZ_{226}	—	August 30, 2005	Kitt Peak	Spacewatch	·	1.5 km	MPC · JPL
460457	2014 SF_{227}	—	November 6, 2008	Catalina	CSS	CYB	4.2 km	MPC · JPL
460458	2014 SO_{228}	—	March 30, 2008	Kitt Peak	Spacewatch	·	1.4 km	MPC · JPL
460459	2014 SP_{228}	—	October 14, 2009	Mount Lemmon	Mount Lemmon Survey	·	2.1 km	MPC · JPL
460460	2014 SY_{235}	—	September 28, 1997	Kitt Peak	Spacewatch	·	2.5 km	MPC · JPL
460461	2014 SO_{237}	—	August 23, 2004	Kitt Peak	Spacewatch	·	590 m	MPC · JPL
460462	2014 SK_{257}	—	August 28, 2005	Kitt Peak	Spacewatch	·	2.0 km	MPC · JPL
460463	2014 SJ_{258}	—	January 28, 2007	Kitt Peak	Spacewatch	·	1.7 km	MPC · JPL
460464	2014 SH_{260}	—	May 11, 2010	Mount Lemmon	Mount Lemmon Survey	·	860 m	MPC · JPL
460465	2014 SH_{263}	—	January 31, 2009	Mount Lemmon	Mount Lemmon Survey	·	970 m	MPC · JPL
460466	2014 SK_{264}	—	July 31, 2009	Siding Spring	SSS	·	2.3 km	MPC · JPL
460467	2014 SR_{264}	—	May 7, 2010	Mount Lemmon	Mount Lemmon Survey	·	610 m	MPC · JPL
460468	2014 SV_{264}	—	November 3, 2005	Mount Lemmon	Mount Lemmon Survey	·	2.4 km	MPC · JPL
460469	2014 SW_{264}	—	October 23, 2003	Kitt Peak	Spacewatch	·	2.5 km	MPC · JPL
460470	2014 SL_{265}	—	December 20, 2009	Catalina	CSS	·	3.7 km	MPC · JPL
460471	2014 SR_{265}	—	February 20, 2009	Mount Lemmon	Mount Lemmon Survey	·	830 m	MPC · JPL
460472	2014 SR_{266}	—	July 29, 2008	Kitt Peak	Spacewatch	·	3.2 km	MPC · JPL
460473	2014 SY_{266}	—	April 29, 2008	Mount Lemmon	Mount Lemmon Survey	·	2.6 km	MPC · JPL
460474	2014 SD_{267}	—	April 25, 2006	Mount Lemmon	Mount Lemmon Survey	V	590 m	MPC · JPL
460475	2014 SZ_{268}	—	October 20, 2003	Kitt Peak	Spacewatch	·	2.1 km	MPC · JPL
460476	2014 SD_{280}	—	January 28, 2011	Kitt Peak	Spacewatch	·	2.7 km	MPC · JPL
460477	2014 SB_{283}	—	May 3, 2013	Mount Lemmon	Mount Lemmon Survey	·	1.4 km	MPC · JPL
460478	2014 SY_{285}	—	October 27, 2005	Kitt Peak	Spacewatch	·	2.1 km	MPC · JPL
460479	2014 SG_{287}	—	December 1, 2005	Kitt Peak	Spacewatch	KOR	1.7 km	MPC · JPL
460480	2014 SS_{288}	—	November 9, 2009	Kitt Peak	Spacewatch	·	3.2 km	MPC · JPL
460481	2014 SZ_{288}	—	March 18, 2010	Kitt Peak	Spacewatch	·	760 m	MPC · JPL
460482	2014 SK_{289}	—	October 23, 1995	Kitt Peak	Spacewatch	NYS	1.0 km	MPC · JPL
460483	2014 SY_{291}	—	September 18, 2009	Mount Lemmon	Mount Lemmon Survey	·	2.0 km	MPC · JPL
460484	2014 SG_{298}	—	September 9, 2007	Kitt Peak	Spacewatch	·	900 m	MPC · JPL
460485	2014 SJ_{301}	—	January 14, 2010	WISE	WISE	·	1.5 km	MPC · JPL
460486	2014 SR_{302}	—	September 22, 2009	Catalina	CSS	·	2.7 km	MPC · JPL
460487	2014 SE_{303}	—	February 9, 2010	Mount Lemmon	Mount Lemmon Survey	·	3.7 km	MPC · JPL
460488	2014 SR_{304}	—	March 2, 2010	WISE	WISE	·	3.5 km	MPC · JPL
460489	2014 SS_{305}	—	October 29, 1999	Kitt Peak	Spacewatch	·	1.3 km	MPC · JPL
460490	2014 SD_{307}	—	August 28, 2009	Kitt Peak	Spacewatch	·	3.0 km	MPC · JPL
460491	2014 SO_{307}	—	September 5, 2008	Kitt Peak	Spacewatch	·	3.3 km	MPC · JPL
460492	2014 SX_{309}	—	October 8, 2008	Kitt Peak	Spacewatch	EOS	2.4 km	MPC · JPL
460493	2014 SG_{310}	—	October 20, 2003	Kitt Peak	Spacewatch	EOS	2.1 km	MPC · JPL
460494	2014 SL_{310}	—	February 20, 2009	Kitt Peak	Spacewatch	·	1.3 km	MPC · JPL
460495	2014 SZ_{310}	—	January 19, 2010	WISE	WISE	·	3.5 km	MPC · JPL
460496	2014 SQ_{311}	—	October 2, 2003	Kitt Peak	Spacewatch	·	1.4 km	MPC · JPL
460497	2014 SS_{311}	—	November 22, 2006	Kitt Peak	Spacewatch	(5)	1.2 km	MPC · JPL
460498	2014 SK_{313}	—	November 10, 2009	Mount Lemmon	Mount Lemmon Survey	·	1.8 km	MPC · JPL
460499	2014 SF_{315}	—	November 8, 2010	Kitt Peak	Spacewatch	·	1.3 km	MPC · JPL
460500	2014 SN_{316}	—	October 3, 2008	Mount Lemmon	Mount Lemmon Survey	CYB	4.0 km	MPC · JPL

== 460501–460600 ==
back to top

Designation			Discovery			Properties		Ref
Permanent	Provisional	Named after	Date	Site	Discoverer(s)	Category	Diam.	Ref
460501	2014 SJ_{317}	—	September 20, 2000	Kitt Peak	Spacewatch	HOF	3.1 km	MPC · JPL
460502	2014 SP_{317}	—	March 1, 2010	WISE	WISE	·	3.3 km	MPC · JPL
460503	2014 SM_{318}	—	September 5, 2008	Kitt Peak	Spacewatch	·	2.8 km	MPC · JPL
460504	2014 SX_{323}	—	March 27, 2010	WISE	WISE	·	3.1 km	MPC · JPL
460505	2014 SV_{327}	—	May 27, 2008	Kitt Peak	Spacewatch	AGN	1.0 km	MPC · JPL
460506	2014 SP_{330}	—	January 10, 1997	Kitt Peak	Spacewatch	·	2.1 km	MPC · JPL
460507	2014 SR_{330}	—	April 12, 2010	WISE	WISE	·	3.1 km	MPC · JPL
460508	2014 SA_{334}	—	September 28, 2003	Kitt Peak	Spacewatch	·	3.0 km	MPC · JPL
460509	2014 SU_{334}	—	October 27, 2009	Mount Lemmon	Mount Lemmon Survey	·	4.2 km	MPC · JPL
460510	2014 SP_{339}	—	December 22, 2005	Kitt Peak	Spacewatch	·	1.9 km	MPC · JPL
460511	2014 SA_{341}	—	January 5, 2011	Catalina	CSS	·	2.9 km	MPC · JPL
460512	2014 SS_{345}	—	February 7, 2008	Kitt Peak	Spacewatch	·	1.3 km	MPC · JPL
460513	2014 SR_{346}	—	October 11, 2005	Kitt Peak	Spacewatch	·	2.0 km	MPC · JPL
460514	2014 SF_{347}	—	October 1, 2003	Kitt Peak	Spacewatch	·	3.0 km	MPC · JPL
460515	2014 SJ_{347}	—	March 14, 2010	WISE	WISE	·	3.5 km	MPC · JPL
460516	2014 TC_{2}	—	April 5, 2008	Mount Lemmon	Mount Lemmon Survey	·	1.5 km	MPC · JPL
460517	2014 TW_{2}	—	November 23, 2009	Kitt Peak	Spacewatch	EOS	4.3 km	MPC · JPL
460518	2014 TC_{5}	—	March 15, 2008	Kitt Peak	Spacewatch	·	1.7 km	MPC · JPL
460519	2014 TD_{5}	—	November 11, 2009	Kitt Peak	Spacewatch	·	2.6 km	MPC · JPL
460520	2014 TJ_{9}	—	February 15, 2010	WISE	WISE	·	2.7 km	MPC · JPL
460521	2014 TU_{9}	—	October 5, 2005	Kitt Peak	Spacewatch	·	1.5 km	MPC · JPL
460522	2014 TB_{11}	—	October 24, 2003	Kitt Peak	Spacewatch	·	3.1 km	MPC · JPL
460523	2014 TJ_{11}	—	November 30, 2011	Kitt Peak	Spacewatch	·	820 m	MPC · JPL
460524	2014 TQ_{14}	—	December 26, 2005	Kitt Peak	Spacewatch	·	1.8 km	MPC · JPL
460525	2014 TO_{15}	—	August 8, 2004	Socorro	LINEAR	·	700 m	MPC · JPL
460526	2014 TF_{16}	—	October 17, 2003	Kitt Peak	Spacewatch	·	2.6 km	MPC · JPL
460527	2014 TD_{23}	—	October 1, 2005	Catalina	CSS	·	1.8 km	MPC · JPL
460528	2014 TS_{23}	—	December 5, 2007	Kitt Peak	Spacewatch	·	1.3 km	MPC · JPL
460529	2014 TW_{26}	—	March 17, 2010	WISE	WISE	·	3.0 km	MPC · JPL
460530	2014 TA_{28}	—	February 2, 2006	Kitt Peak	Spacewatch	·	3.7 km	MPC · JPL
460531	2014 TF_{28}	—	April 20, 2007	Kitt Peak	Spacewatch	·	1.9 km	MPC · JPL
460532	2014 TQ_{29}	—	November 5, 2010	Kitt Peak	Spacewatch	·	1.5 km	MPC · JPL
460533	2014 TA_{31}	—	March 16, 2007	Kitt Peak	Spacewatch	·	1.9 km	MPC · JPL
460534	2014 TJ_{31}	—	September 6, 2008	Mount Lemmon	Mount Lemmon Survey	·	3.3 km	MPC · JPL
460535	2014 TF_{36}	—	December 6, 2005	Kitt Peak	Spacewatch	AGN	970 m	MPC · JPL
460536	2014 TD_{38}	—	October 10, 2005	Kitt Peak	Spacewatch	·	1.7 km	MPC · JPL
460537	2014 TE_{39}	—	December 18, 2003	Kitt Peak	Spacewatch	·	4.0 km	MPC · JPL
460538	2014 TW_{40}	—	April 20, 2010	WISE	WISE	·	5.0 km	MPC · JPL
460539	2014 TX_{40}	—	August 15, 2009	Siding Spring	SSS	·	2.7 km	MPC · JPL
460540	2014 TN_{42}	—	September 15, 2009	Kitt Peak	Spacewatch	·	2.0 km	MPC · JPL
460541	2014 TA_{44}	—	May 7, 2000	Kitt Peak	Spacewatch	·	1.5 km	MPC · JPL
460542	2014 TP_{45}	—	October 18, 2003	Kitt Peak	Spacewatch	THM	2.3 km	MPC · JPL
460543	2014 TR_{47}	—	October 8, 2004	Kitt Peak	Spacewatch	·	750 m	MPC · JPL
460544	2014 TM_{48}	—	October 2, 2003	Kitt Peak	Spacewatch	·	2.6 km	MPC · JPL
460545	2014 TY_{48}	—	September 27, 2008	Mount Lemmon	Mount Lemmon Survey	·	3.7 km	MPC · JPL
460546	2014 TP_{55}	—	January 3, 2003	Socorro	LINEAR	EUN	1.7 km	MPC · JPL
460547	2014 TD_{56}	—	November 18, 2009	Kitt Peak	Spacewatch	·	3.0 km	MPC · JPL
460548	2014 TN_{56}	—	December 6, 2010	Mount Lemmon	Mount Lemmon Survey	(5)	1.3 km	MPC · JPL
460549	2014 TV_{56}	—	May 2, 2008	Kitt Peak	Spacewatch	·	1.4 km	MPC · JPL
460550	2014 TK_{57}	—	June 9, 2012	Mount Lemmon	Mount Lemmon Survey	·	2.7 km	MPC · JPL
460551	2014 TL_{58}	—	September 22, 2009	Catalina	CSS	BRA	1.3 km	MPC · JPL
460552	2014 TX_{59}	—	October 19, 2003	Kitt Peak	Spacewatch	·	2.7 km	MPC · JPL
460553	2014 TY_{59}	—	October 19, 2003	Kitt Peak	Spacewatch	·	2.6 km	MPC · JPL
460554	2014 TB_{60}	—	November 20, 2003	Kitt Peak	Spacewatch	·	2.9 km	MPC · JPL
460555	2014 TC_{62}	—	April 1, 2010	WISE	WISE	·	4.4 km	MPC · JPL
460556	2014 TZ_{64}	—	March 25, 2006	Kitt Peak	Spacewatch	T_{j} (2.99)	4.0 km	MPC · JPL
460557	2014 TX_{66}	—	October 19, 2003	Kitt Peak	Spacewatch	·	2.5 km	MPC · JPL
460558	2014 TD_{68}	—	September 14, 2007	Mount Lemmon	Mount Lemmon Survey	·	1.1 km	MPC · JPL
460559	2014 TE_{68}	—	March 27, 2012	Catalina	CSS	·	2.6 km	MPC · JPL
460560	2014 TF_{68}	—	September 18, 2010	Mount Lemmon	Mount Lemmon Survey	EUN	1.4 km	MPC · JPL
460561	2014 TF_{69}	—	October 21, 2008	Mount Lemmon	Mount Lemmon Survey	VER	2.6 km	MPC · JPL
460562	2014 TZ_{71}	—	August 17, 1999	Kitt Peak	Spacewatch	·	920 m	MPC · JPL
460563	2014 TR_{72}	—	September 28, 2009	Kitt Peak	Spacewatch	·	2.2 km	MPC · JPL
460564	2014 TV_{72}	—	June 18, 2005	Mount Lemmon	Mount Lemmon Survey	·	1.4 km	MPC · JPL
460565	2014 TM_{73}	—	May 24, 2007	Mount Lemmon	Mount Lemmon Survey	·	2.9 km	MPC · JPL
460566	2014 TA_{75}	—	October 24, 2008	Kitt Peak	Spacewatch	CYB	3.6 km	MPC · JPL
460567	2014 TF_{75}	—	November 4, 2005	Kitt Peak	Spacewatch	·	2.1 km	MPC · JPL
460568	2014 TM_{79}	—	October 23, 2003	Kitt Peak	Spacewatch	·	3.2 km	MPC · JPL
460569	2014 TF_{82}	—	November 15, 2003	Kitt Peak	Spacewatch	·	2.1 km	MPC · JPL
460570	2014 UB	—	March 3, 2006	Catalina	CSS	EOS	2.5 km	MPC · JPL
460571	2014 UX_{4}	—	November 20, 2001	Socorro	LINEAR	CYB	5.4 km	MPC · JPL
460572	2014 UW_{5}	—	November 21, 1995	Kitt Peak	Spacewatch	·	2.1 km	MPC · JPL
460573	2014 UM_{6}	—	September 30, 2003	Kitt Peak	Spacewatch	EOS	1.3 km	MPC · JPL
460574	2014 UA_{7}	—	February 8, 2007	Mount Lemmon	Mount Lemmon Survey	·	1.6 km	MPC · JPL
460575	2014 UP_{7}	—	October 18, 2003	Kitt Peak	Spacewatch	·	2.1 km	MPC · JPL
460576	2014 UW_{8}	—	August 16, 2009	Kitt Peak	Spacewatch	·	1.8 km	MPC · JPL
460577	2014 UX_{12}	—	February 20, 2006	Kitt Peak	Spacewatch	·	2.5 km	MPC · JPL
460578	2014 UH_{13}	—	September 19, 2003	Kitt Peak	Spacewatch	EOS	1.6 km	MPC · JPL
460579	2014 UV_{13}	—	September 29, 2005	Kitt Peak	Spacewatch	MRX	1.1 km	MPC · JPL
460580	2014 UF_{14}	—	March 13, 2007	Catalina	CSS	·	3.0 km	MPC · JPL
460581	2014 UT_{15}	—	September 21, 2003	Kitt Peak	Spacewatch	·	3.2 km	MPC · JPL
460582	2014 UR_{16}	—	October 26, 2005	Kitt Peak	Spacewatch	·	1.6 km	MPC · JPL
460583	2014 UE_{17}	—	December 29, 2005	Mount Lemmon	Mount Lemmon Survey	(18466)	2.5 km	MPC · JPL
460584	2014 UR_{17}	—	September 23, 2005	Kitt Peak	Spacewatch	·	1.7 km	MPC · JPL
460585	2014 US_{18}	—	March 26, 2009	Kitt Peak	Spacewatch	·	1.1 km	MPC · JPL
460586	2014 UZ_{18}	—	November 15, 2003	Kitt Peak	Spacewatch	(31811)	3.0 km	MPC · JPL
460587	2014 UF_{19}	—	May 20, 2006	Kitt Peak	Spacewatch	·	3.3 km	MPC · JPL
460588	2014 US_{20}	—	October 25, 2008	Mount Lemmon	Mount Lemmon Survey	CYB	2.8 km	MPC · JPL
460589	2014 UM_{24}	—	January 13, 2005	Kitt Peak	Spacewatch	·	2.4 km	MPC · JPL
460590	2014 UH_{25}	—	December 28, 2005	Mount Lemmon	Mount Lemmon Survey	·	2.2 km	MPC · JPL
460591	2014 UP_{26}	—	October 9, 2004	Kitt Peak	Spacewatch	·	660 m	MPC · JPL
460592	2014 UY_{28}	—	October 8, 2008	Mount Lemmon	Mount Lemmon Survey	EOS	2.4 km	MPC · JPL
460593	2014 UT_{40}	—	May 3, 2005	Kitt Peak	Spacewatch	·	4.0 km	MPC · JPL
460594	2014 UM_{41}	—	November 3, 2005	Catalina	CSS	·	2.1 km	MPC · JPL
460595	2014 UC_{42}	—	December 27, 2005	Mount Lemmon	Mount Lemmon Survey	·	1.7 km	MPC · JPL
460596	2014 UK_{44}	—	September 26, 2005	Kitt Peak	Spacewatch	WIT	1 km	MPC · JPL
460597	2014 UV_{45}	—	March 4, 2005	Mount Lemmon	Mount Lemmon Survey	·	2.3 km	MPC · JPL
460598	2014 UK_{46}	—	September 14, 2006	Catalina	CSS	MAS	820 m	MPC · JPL
460599	2014 UX_{46}	—	October 25, 2003	Kitt Peak	Spacewatch	·	2.2 km	MPC · JPL
460600	2014 US_{47}	—	November 14, 1995	Kitt Peak	Spacewatch	CYB	4.0 km	MPC · JPL

== 460601–460700 ==
back to top

Designation			Discovery			Properties		Ref
Permanent	Provisional	Named after	Date	Site	Discoverer(s)	Category	Diam.	Ref
460601	2014 UO_{48}	—	November 23, 2006	Mount Lemmon	Mount Lemmon Survey	·	1.6 km	MPC · JPL
460602	2014 UM_{49}	—	October 8, 2010	Kitt Peak	Spacewatch	·	1.1 km	MPC · JPL
460603	2014 UE_{50}	—	July 25, 2008	Mount Lemmon	Mount Lemmon Survey	·	2.4 km	MPC · JPL
460604	2014 UO_{50}	—	March 12, 2010	WISE	WISE	·	4.7 km	MPC · JPL
460605	2014 UB_{51}	—	September 17, 2009	Kitt Peak	Spacewatch	·	2.1 km	MPC · JPL
460606	2014 UL_{52}	—	November 11, 2004	Kitt Peak	Spacewatch	·	1.7 km	MPC · JPL
460607	2014 UW_{55}	—	November 6, 2005	Mount Lemmon	Mount Lemmon Survey	·	1.9 km	MPC · JPL
460608	2014 UB_{57}	—	February 28, 2010	WISE	WISE	·	3.3 km	MPC · JPL
460609	2014 UX_{63}	—	October 14, 2007	Mount Lemmon	Mount Lemmon Survey	·	670 m	MPC · JPL
460610	2014 UC_{66}	—	October 8, 2008	Mount Lemmon	Mount Lemmon Survey	·	3.1 km	MPC · JPL
460611	2014 UE_{66}	—	October 24, 2005	Kitt Peak	Spacewatch	·	1.8 km	MPC · JPL
460612	2014 UX_{67}	—	September 23, 2008	Kitt Peak	Spacewatch	EOS	1.7 km	MPC · JPL
460613	2014 UH_{68}	—	October 29, 2003	Kitt Peak	Spacewatch	·	2.4 km	MPC · JPL
460614	2014 UJ_{74}	—	April 12, 2004	Kitt Peak	Spacewatch	MIS	2.6 km	MPC · JPL
460615	2014 UM_{78}	—	November 20, 2006	Kitt Peak	Spacewatch	·	1.3 km	MPC · JPL
460616	2014 UK_{79}	—	November 8, 2008	Kitt Peak	Spacewatch	CYB	4.7 km	MPC · JPL
460617	2014 UD_{81}	—	March 11, 2007	Mount Lemmon	Mount Lemmon Survey	KOR	1.4 km	MPC · JPL
460618	2014 UD_{83}	—	March 15, 2007	Kitt Peak	Spacewatch	·	2.2 km	MPC · JPL
460619	2014 UF_{83}	—	November 14, 1995	Kitt Peak	Spacewatch	·	1.9 km	MPC · JPL
460620	2014 UF_{84}	—	November 16, 1998	Kitt Peak	Spacewatch	·	3.4 km	MPC · JPL
460621	2014 UA_{85}	—	November 8, 2009	Mount Lemmon	Mount Lemmon Survey	·	1.8 km	MPC · JPL
460622	2014 UD_{85}	—	September 19, 2003	Kitt Peak	Spacewatch	·	2.2 km	MPC · JPL
460623	2014 UJ_{86}	—	September 24, 2008	Mount Lemmon	Mount Lemmon Survey	·	2.2 km	MPC · JPL
460624	2014 UU_{89}	—	May 2, 2006	Kitt Peak	Spacewatch	·	3.2 km	MPC · JPL
460625	2014 UW_{91}	—	October 1, 2003	Kitt Peak	Spacewatch	·	2.3 km	MPC · JPL
460626	2014 UY_{93}	—	August 31, 2005	Kitt Peak	Spacewatch	·	1.6 km	MPC · JPL
460627	2014 UP_{94}	—	October 1, 2008	Mount Lemmon	Mount Lemmon Survey	·	2.4 km	MPC · JPL
460628	2014 US_{95}	—	September 19, 2009	Mount Lemmon	Mount Lemmon Survey	·	1.6 km	MPC · JPL
460629	2014 UX_{96}	—	March 25, 2006	Mount Lemmon	Mount Lemmon Survey	·	3.1 km	MPC · JPL
460630	2014 UB_{97}	—	April 30, 2006	Kitt Peak	Spacewatch	·	2.9 km	MPC · JPL
460631	2014 UX_{99}	—	December 8, 2010	Kitt Peak	Spacewatch	·	1.7 km	MPC · JPL
460632	2014 UW_{101}	—	September 29, 2005	Mount Lemmon	Mount Lemmon Survey	·	1.6 km	MPC · JPL
460633	2014 UD_{102}	—	September 24, 2009	Mount Lemmon	Mount Lemmon Survey	·	1.5 km	MPC · JPL
460634	2014 UT_{105}	—	October 21, 2003	Kitt Peak	Spacewatch	·	2.4 km	MPC · JPL
460635	2014 UA_{107}	—	October 25, 2009	Kitt Peak	Spacewatch	EOS	2.4 km	MPC · JPL
460636	2014 UB_{108}	—	April 13, 2004	Kitt Peak	Spacewatch	·	1.2 km	MPC · JPL
460637	2014 UV_{108}	—	March 31, 2003	Kitt Peak	Spacewatch	·	2.9 km	MPC · JPL
460638	2014 UZ_{108}	—	January 23, 2006	Kitt Peak	Spacewatch	·	2.1 km	MPC · JPL
460639	2014 UE_{113}	—	November 30, 2003	Kitt Peak	Spacewatch	·	2.8 km	MPC · JPL
460640	2014 UR_{113}	—	February 25, 2006	Kitt Peak	Spacewatch	·	1.6 km	MPC · JPL
460641	2014 UO_{116}	—	October 9, 2004	Anderson Mesa	LONEOS	·	770 m	MPC · JPL
460642	2014 UR_{117}	—	December 4, 2007	Mount Lemmon	Mount Lemmon Survey	NYS	1.1 km	MPC · JPL
460643	2014 US_{117}	—	April 9, 2010	WISE	WISE	THB	3.2 km	MPC · JPL
460644	2014 UT_{120}	—	April 29, 2012	Mount Lemmon	Mount Lemmon Survey	·	2.7 km	MPC · JPL
460645	2014 UF_{121}	—	September 28, 2003	Kitt Peak	Spacewatch	·	1.5 km	MPC · JPL
460646	2014 UH_{125}	—	September 30, 2003	Kitt Peak	Spacewatch	(21885)	3.5 km	MPC · JPL
460647	2014 UJ_{126}	—	November 23, 2006	Mount Lemmon	Mount Lemmon Survey	·	1.8 km	MPC · JPL
460648	2014 UT_{126}	—	October 31, 2010	Kitt Peak	Spacewatch	·	1.2 km	MPC · JPL
460649	2014 UV_{130}	—	November 1, 2005	Kitt Peak	Spacewatch	·	1.9 km	MPC · JPL
460650	2014 UQ_{131}	—	November 4, 2005	Catalina	CSS	·	2.3 km	MPC · JPL
460651	2014 UN_{134}	—	October 25, 2003	Kitt Peak	Spacewatch	·	3.2 km	MPC · JPL
460652	2014 UM_{135}	—	August 16, 2009	Kitt Peak	Spacewatch	·	1.5 km	MPC · JPL
460653	2014 UN_{135}	—	September 14, 2005	Kitt Peak	Spacewatch	(17392)	1.7 km	MPC · JPL
460654	2014 US_{135}	—	September 19, 2003	Kitt Peak	Spacewatch	·	2.1 km	MPC · JPL
460655	2014 UC_{138}	—	October 27, 2009	Mount Lemmon	Mount Lemmon Survey	·	2.1 km	MPC · JPL
460656	2014 UD_{140}	—	November 24, 2011	Mount Lemmon	Mount Lemmon Survey	·	760 m	MPC · JPL
460657	2014 UZ_{142}	—	March 11, 2007	Kitt Peak	Spacewatch	·	1.8 km	MPC · JPL
460658	2014 UU_{143}	—	November 10, 2009	Kitt Peak	Spacewatch	EOS	1.4 km	MPC · JPL
460659	2014 UE_{144}	—	April 2, 2006	Kitt Peak	Spacewatch	·	2.9 km	MPC · JPL
460660	2014 UW_{148}	—	March 10, 2007	Mount Lemmon	Mount Lemmon Survey	·	1.4 km	MPC · JPL
460661	2014 UG_{149}	—	July 5, 2005	Mount Lemmon	Mount Lemmon Survey	(5)	1.4 km	MPC · JPL
460662	2014 UC_{150}	—	October 11, 2009	Mount Lemmon	Mount Lemmon Survey	·	1.9 km	MPC · JPL
460663	2014 UR_{155}	—	October 10, 2010	Mount Lemmon	Mount Lemmon Survey	EUN	1.1 km	MPC · JPL
460664	2014 UA_{156}	—	September 25, 2008	Kitt Peak	Spacewatch	·	2.5 km	MPC · JPL
460665	2014 UQ_{156}	—	November 9, 2009	Kitt Peak	Spacewatch	EOS	1.9 km	MPC · JPL
460666	2014 US_{156}	—	December 1, 2010	Mount Lemmon	Mount Lemmon Survey	·	1.3 km	MPC · JPL
460667	2014 UZ_{156}	—	December 1, 2003	Kitt Peak	Spacewatch	·	2.9 km	MPC · JPL
460668	2014 UA_{157}	—	November 3, 2005	Kitt Peak	Spacewatch	·	2.6 km	MPC · JPL
460669	2014 UC_{157}	—	October 28, 2005	Mount Lemmon	Mount Lemmon Survey	·	1.6 km	MPC · JPL
460670	2014 UE_{157}	—	January 2, 2006	Mount Lemmon	Mount Lemmon Survey	·	2.0 km	MPC · JPL
460671	2014 UF_{161}	—	December 5, 2005	Mount Lemmon	Mount Lemmon Survey	AGN	980 m	MPC · JPL
460672	2014 UL_{163}	—	December 7, 2005	Kitt Peak	Spacewatch	·	2.0 km	MPC · JPL
460673	2014 UU_{163}	—	October 2, 2003	Kitt Peak	Spacewatch	·	3.5 km	MPC · JPL
460674	2014 UB_{164}	—	April 15, 2005	Catalina	CSS	THB	3.7 km	MPC · JPL
460675	2014 UB_{165}	—	July 10, 2005	Kitt Peak	Spacewatch	BRG	1.6 km	MPC · JPL
460676	2014 UW_{165}	—	November 30, 2005	Kitt Peak	Spacewatch	615	1.8 km	MPC · JPL
460677	2014 UX_{169}	—	May 16, 2012	Kitt Peak	Spacewatch	·	2.9 km	MPC · JPL
460678	2014 UK_{170}	—	September 21, 2009	Catalina	CSS	GEF	1.5 km	MPC · JPL
460679	2014 UJ_{172}	—	December 16, 2009	Mount Lemmon	Mount Lemmon Survey	VER	3.3 km	MPC · JPL
460680	2014 UR_{172}	—	January 12, 2011	Mount Lemmon	Mount Lemmon Survey	·	1.8 km	MPC · JPL
460681	2014 US_{176}	—	May 30, 2006	Mount Lemmon	Mount Lemmon Survey	·	3.3 km	MPC · JPL
460682	2014 UC_{177}	—	October 4, 2006	Mount Lemmon	Mount Lemmon Survey	·	1.4 km	MPC · JPL
460683	2014 UG_{179}	—	September 28, 2003	Kitt Peak	Spacewatch	·	1.4 km	MPC · JPL
460684	2014 UB_{180}	—	May 4, 2006	Kitt Peak	Spacewatch	·	3.0 km	MPC · JPL
460685	2014 US_{180}	—	October 21, 2007	Kitt Peak	Spacewatch	·	1.1 km	MPC · JPL
460686	2014 UC_{182}	—	September 11, 2004	Kitt Peak	Spacewatch	KOR	1.3 km	MPC · JPL
460687	2014 UL_{182}	—	November 19, 2007	Kitt Peak	Spacewatch	NYS	1.1 km	MPC · JPL
460688	2014 UX_{185}	—	October 1, 2003	Kitt Peak	Spacewatch	EOS	2.0 km	MPC · JPL
460689	2014 UB_{187}	—	September 24, 2008	Kitt Peak	Spacewatch	·	3.3 km	MPC · JPL
460690	2014 UA_{188}	—	October 24, 2004	Kitt Peak	Spacewatch	KOR	1.2 km	MPC · JPL
460691	2014 UV_{189}	—	September 20, 2001	Socorro	LINEAR	·	1.3 km	MPC · JPL
460692	2014 UJ_{191}	—	March 30, 2008	Kitt Peak	Spacewatch	·	1.9 km	MPC · JPL
460693	2014 UV_{195}	—	October 31, 2010	Kitt Peak	Spacewatch	·	1.5 km	MPC · JPL
460694	2014 UY_{195}	—	August 18, 2009	Kitt Peak	Spacewatch	·	2.5 km	MPC · JPL
460695	2014 UL_{197}	—	November 2, 2010	Kitt Peak	Spacewatch	·	1.3 km	MPC · JPL
460696	2014 UY_{199}	—	December 2, 2005	Kitt Peak	Spacewatch	BRA	2.2 km	MPC · JPL
460697	2014 UB_{200}	—	November 16, 2009	Mount Lemmon	Mount Lemmon Survey	·	1.4 km	MPC · JPL
460698	2014 UZ_{200}	—	December 10, 2004	Kitt Peak	Spacewatch	·	1.7 km	MPC · JPL
460699	2014 UP_{202}	—	February 28, 2006	Mount Lemmon	Mount Lemmon Survey	·	3.9 km	MPC · JPL
460700	2014 UW_{205}	—	October 25, 2008	Catalina	CSS	·	3.1 km	MPC · JPL

== 460701–460800 ==
back to top

Designation			Discovery			Properties		Ref
Permanent	Provisional	Named after	Date	Site	Discoverer(s)	Category	Diam.	Ref
460701	2014 UK_{208}	—	December 20, 2004	Mount Lemmon	Mount Lemmon Survey	·	2.4 km	MPC · JPL
460702	2014 UQ_{209}	—	December 2, 2008	Mount Lemmon	Mount Lemmon Survey	CYB	3.3 km	MPC · JPL
460703	2014 UK_{214}	—	January 16, 2005	Kitt Peak	Spacewatch	·	3.6 km	MPC · JPL
460704	2014 UF_{215}	—	January 8, 2011	Mount Lemmon	Mount Lemmon Survey	·	3.7 km	MPC · JPL
460705	2014 UG_{216}	—	May 21, 2006	Kitt Peak	Spacewatch	·	4.9 km	MPC · JPL
460706	2014 UO_{216}	—	December 14, 2010	Mount Lemmon	Mount Lemmon Survey	·	1.7 km	MPC · JPL
460707	2014 US_{216}	—	September 11, 2004	Kitt Peak	Spacewatch	BRA	1.6 km	MPC · JPL
460708	2014 UN_{217}	—	October 14, 2001	Socorro	LINEAR	·	1.6 km	MPC · JPL
460709	2014 UX_{218}	—	September 28, 2008	Catalina	CSS	·	4.0 km	MPC · JPL
460710	2014 UY_{220}	—	September 19, 2001	Socorro	LINEAR	·	1.6 km	MPC · JPL
460711	2014 UO_{223}	—	September 10, 2010	Kitt Peak	Spacewatch	·	1.5 km	MPC · JPL
460712	2014 UD_{224}	—	November 10, 2004	Kitt Peak	Spacewatch	EOS	2.3 km	MPC · JPL
460713	2014 VB	—	July 30, 2005	Siding Spring	SSS	·	2.4 km	MPC · JPL
460714	2014 VH_{3}	—	October 1, 2005	Catalina	CSS	·	2.2 km	MPC · JPL
460715	2014 VK_{3}	—	December 19, 2007	Mount Lemmon	Mount Lemmon Survey	·	1.5 km	MPC · JPL
460716	2014 VP_{3}	—	November 11, 2001	Socorro	LINEAR	EUN	1.3 km	MPC · JPL
460717	2014 VT_{3}	—	February 2, 2010	WISE	WISE	·	2.5 km	MPC · JPL
460718	2014 VY_{3}	—	October 30, 2010	Mount Lemmon	Mount Lemmon Survey	·	1.6 km	MPC · JPL
460719	2014 VP_{4}	—	September 28, 2008	Catalina	CSS	·	3.4 km	MPC · JPL
460720	2014 VM_{5}	—	September 14, 2007	Catalina	CSS	(2076)	780 m	MPC · JPL
460721	2014 VG_{7}	—	December 19, 2004	Mount Lemmon	Mount Lemmon Survey	·	1.1 km	MPC · JPL
460722	2014 VJ_{8}	—	November 26, 2005	Kitt Peak	Spacewatch	WIT	1.1 km	MPC · JPL
460723	2014 VN_{8}	—	October 30, 2005	Mount Lemmon	Mount Lemmon Survey	·	2.2 km	MPC · JPL
460724	2014 VJ_{9}	—	December 18, 2004	Mount Lemmon	Mount Lemmon Survey	·	2.5 km	MPC · JPL
460725	2014 VQ_{10}	—	May 31, 2013	Kitt Peak	Spacewatch	EUN	1.1 km	MPC · JPL
460726	2014 VS_{11}	—	September 15, 2007	Mount Lemmon	Mount Lemmon Survey	V	780 m	MPC · JPL
460727	2014 VX_{11}	—	September 3, 2010	Mount Lemmon	Mount Lemmon Survey	·	1.5 km	MPC · JPL
460728	2014 VM_{12}	—	March 8, 2005	Mount Lemmon	Mount Lemmon Survey	MAS	900 m	MPC · JPL
460729	2014 VU_{12}	—	December 18, 2009	Catalina	CSS	T_{j} (2.98)	3.9 km	MPC · JPL
460730	2014 VC_{13}	—	April 12, 2010	WISE	WISE	T_{j} (2.97)	3.6 km	MPC · JPL
460731	2014 VG_{13}	—	October 23, 2009	Mount Lemmon	Mount Lemmon Survey	KOR	1.5 km	MPC · JPL
460732	2014 VS_{14}	—	November 3, 2007	Mount Lemmon	Mount Lemmon Survey	V	740 m	MPC · JPL
460733	2014 VB_{16}	—	September 12, 2009	Kitt Peak	Spacewatch	·	1.7 km	MPC · JPL
460734	2014 VV_{16}	—	October 12, 2009	Mount Lemmon	Mount Lemmon Survey	TEL	1.4 km	MPC · JPL
460735	2014 VF_{17}	—	November 20, 2003	Kitt Peak	Spacewatch	·	3.8 km	MPC · JPL
460736	2014 VJ_{17}	—	March 13, 2010	WISE	WISE	·	2.4 km	MPC · JPL
460737	2014 VT_{18}	—	October 24, 2005	Kitt Peak	Spacewatch	·	2.2 km	MPC · JPL
460738	2014 VB_{19}	—	October 24, 2005	Kitt Peak	Spacewatch	AGN	1.2 km	MPC · JPL
460739	2014 VD_{19}	—	November 20, 2003	Kitt Peak	Spacewatch	HYG	2.4 km	MPC · JPL
460740	2014 VL_{19}	—	November 13, 2006	Catalina	CSS	·	1.2 km	MPC · JPL
460741	2014 VK_{20}	—	September 4, 2008	Kitt Peak	Spacewatch	·	2.2 km	MPC · JPL
460742	2014 VP_{20}	—	September 19, 2003	Kitt Peak	Spacewatch	·	2.0 km	MPC · JPL
460743	2014 VZ_{20}	—	April 24, 2006	Kitt Peak	Spacewatch	EOS	2.0 km	MPC · JPL
460744	2014 VB_{22}	—	March 9, 2005	Catalina	CSS	·	4.9 km	MPC · JPL
460745	2014 VP_{22}	—	March 13, 2007	Mount Lemmon	Mount Lemmon Survey	·	1.9 km	MPC · JPL
460746	2014 VP_{23}	—	September 29, 2008	Mount Lemmon	Mount Lemmon Survey	·	1.9 km	MPC · JPL
460747	2014 VJ_{24}	—	November 29, 2003	Kitt Peak	Spacewatch	·	3.7 km	MPC · JPL
460748	2014 VN_{25}	—	December 14, 2003	Kitt Peak	Spacewatch	·	3.3 km	MPC · JPL
460749	2014 VV_{25}	—	November 24, 2003	Anderson Mesa	LONEOS	·	2.8 km	MPC · JPL
460750	2014 VJ_{26}	—	September 30, 2009	Mount Lemmon	Mount Lemmon Survey	·	2.4 km	MPC · JPL
460751	2014 VQ_{26}	—	November 26, 2005	Mount Lemmon	Mount Lemmon Survey	MRX	1.1 km	MPC · JPL
460752	2014 VL_{27}	—	December 6, 2005	Kitt Peak	Spacewatch	·	2.1 km	MPC · JPL
460753	2014 VQ_{27}	—	December 20, 2004	Mount Lemmon	Mount Lemmon Survey	EOS	1.9 km	MPC · JPL
460754	2014 VF_{28}	—	September 28, 2008	Mount Lemmon	Mount Lemmon Survey	·	2.7 km	MPC · JPL
460755	2014 VU_{28}	—	September 22, 2008	Catalina	CSS	·	3.3 km	MPC · JPL
460756	2014 VK_{29}	—	November 9, 2009	Kitt Peak	Spacewatch	·	1.9 km	MPC · JPL
460757	2014 VY_{29}	—	October 8, 2004	Kitt Peak	Spacewatch	KOR	1.2 km	MPC · JPL
460758	2014 VJ_{30}	—	October 18, 2009	Mount Lemmon	Mount Lemmon Survey	KOR	1.4 km	MPC · JPL
460759	2014 VD_{31}	—	October 12, 2009	Mount Lemmon	Mount Lemmon Survey	(16286)	1.6 km	MPC · JPL
460760	2014 VH_{32}	—	October 23, 2006	Mount Lemmon	Mount Lemmon Survey	·	1.2 km	MPC · JPL
460761	2014 VK_{33}	—	December 3, 2008	Kitt Peak	Spacewatch	·	3.6 km	MPC · JPL
460762	2014 VQ_{33}	—	December 17, 2001	Socorro	LINEAR	·	2.1 km	MPC · JPL
460763	2014 VW_{34}	—	November 19, 2009	Kitt Peak	Spacewatch	·	1.7 km	MPC · JPL
460764	2014 VT_{36}	—	October 29, 2008	Mount Lemmon	Mount Lemmon Survey	·	2.9 km	MPC · JPL
460765	2014 VA_{37}	—	November 17, 2009	Kitt Peak	Spacewatch	EOS	1.7 km	MPC · JPL
460766	2014 WC_{2}	—	April 1, 2011	Mount Lemmon	Mount Lemmon Survey	·	2.6 km	MPC · JPL
460767	2014 WZ_{2}	—	May 29, 2012	Mount Lemmon	Mount Lemmon Survey	EOS	2.2 km	MPC · JPL
460768	2014 WH_{3}	—	September 20, 2008	Catalina	CSS	·	2.9 km	MPC · JPL
460769	2014 WK_{3}	—	November 18, 2009	Kitt Peak	Spacewatch	·	2.2 km	MPC · JPL
460770	2014 WH_{4}	—	October 10, 2008	Mount Lemmon	Mount Lemmon Survey	VER	4.0 km	MPC · JPL
460771	2014 WW_{7}	—	September 21, 2009	Kitt Peak	Spacewatch	·	3.6 km	MPC · JPL
460772	2014 WY_{7}	—	March 28, 2008	Kitt Peak	Spacewatch	·	2.2 km	MPC · JPL
460773	2014 WR_{10}	—	July 29, 2008	Kitt Peak	Spacewatch	·	2.1 km	MPC · JPL
460774	2014 WX_{10}	—	October 17, 2003	Kitt Peak	Spacewatch	·	2.6 km	MPC · JPL
460775	2014 WB_{11}	—	April 1, 2012	Mount Lemmon	Mount Lemmon Survey	·	1.6 km	MPC · JPL
460776	2014 WJ_{13}	—	September 20, 2008	Kitt Peak	Spacewatch	·	3.1 km	MPC · JPL
460777	2014 WM_{16}	—	December 14, 2010	Mount Lemmon	Mount Lemmon Survey	·	3.0 km	MPC · JPL
460778	2014 WR_{17}	—	April 7, 2006	Kitt Peak	Spacewatch	·	2.5 km	MPC · JPL
460779	2014 WM_{18}	—	October 26, 2009	Mount Lemmon	Mount Lemmon Survey	·	2.9 km	MPC · JPL
460780	2014 WP_{18}	—	April 18, 2010	WISE	WISE	·	3.6 km	MPC · JPL
460781	2014 WY_{18}	—	April 18, 2012	Kitt Peak	Spacewatch	·	2.1 km	MPC · JPL
460782	2014 WR_{19}	—	November 18, 2003	Kitt Peak	Spacewatch	TIR	2.1 km	MPC · JPL
460783	2014 WH_{20}	—	October 18, 2003	Kitt Peak	Spacewatch	EOS	1.8 km	MPC · JPL
460784	2014 WT_{22}	—	October 10, 2008	Mount Lemmon	Mount Lemmon Survey	·	2.7 km	MPC · JPL
460785	2014 WF_{25}	—	January 7, 2011	Kitt Peak	Spacewatch	AST	1.7 km	MPC · JPL
460786	2014 WS_{26}	—	October 4, 2013	Mount Lemmon	Mount Lemmon Survey	L5	8.3 km	MPC · JPL
460787	2014 WW_{27}	—	October 1, 2005	Mount Lemmon	Mount Lemmon Survey	·	1.5 km	MPC · JPL
460788	2014 WD_{30}	—	October 3, 2010	Catalina	CSS	·	1.6 km	MPC · JPL
460789	2014 WD_{31}	—	September 27, 2003	Kitt Peak	Spacewatch	·	1.1 km	MPC · JPL
460790	2014 WH_{32}	—	June 24, 2011	Mount Lemmon	Mount Lemmon Survey	L5	9.7 km	MPC · JPL
460791	2014 WH_{35}	—	September 28, 2008	Mount Lemmon	Mount Lemmon Survey	·	3.1 km	MPC · JPL
460792	2014 WQ_{36}	—	February 2, 2006	Mount Lemmon	Mount Lemmon Survey	·	2.0 km	MPC · JPL
460793	2014 WZ_{36}	—	September 14, 2005	Kitt Peak	Spacewatch	·	1.6 km	MPC · JPL
460794	2014 WK_{37}	—	December 14, 2001	Kitt Peak	Spacewatch	·	1.9 km	MPC · JPL
460795	2014 WZ_{37}	—	March 8, 2008	Mount Lemmon	Mount Lemmon Survey	·	1.1 km	MPC · JPL
460796	2014 WW_{41}	—	January 30, 2006	Kitt Peak	Spacewatch	·	770 m	MPC · JPL
460797	2014 WQ_{42}	—	December 4, 2005	Kitt Peak	Spacewatch	HOF	2.4 km	MPC · JPL
460798	2014 WT_{43}	—	October 8, 2008	Mount Lemmon	Mount Lemmon Survey	·	2.8 km	MPC · JPL
460799	2014 WP_{44}	—	February 9, 2005	Kitt Peak	Spacewatch	·	2.8 km	MPC · JPL
460800	2014 WF_{45}	—	September 23, 2008	Kitt Peak	Spacewatch	·	2.9 km	MPC · JPL

== 460801–460900 ==
back to top

Designation			Discovery			Properties		Ref
Permanent	Provisional	Named after	Date	Site	Discoverer(s)	Category	Diam.	Ref
460801	2014 WJ_{47}	—	March 16, 2007	Kitt Peak	Spacewatch	615	1.5 km	MPC · JPL
460802	2014 WO_{47}	—	October 28, 2008	Mount Lemmon	Mount Lemmon Survey	·	3.1 km	MPC · JPL
460803	2014 WR_{47}	—	March 28, 2008	Mount Lemmon	Mount Lemmon Survey	·	1.1 km	MPC · JPL
460804	2014 WW_{47}	—	September 26, 1995	Kitt Peak	Spacewatch	·	2.0 km	MPC · JPL
460805	2014 WK_{49}	—	January 22, 2006	Mount Lemmon	Mount Lemmon Survey	·	1.7 km	MPC · JPL
460806	2014 WY_{49}	—	December 18, 2003	Kitt Peak	Spacewatch	LIX	3.7 km	MPC · JPL
460807	2014 WM_{50}	—	May 10, 2007	Mount Lemmon	Mount Lemmon Survey	·	2.6 km	MPC · JPL
460808	2014 WP_{51}	—	August 25, 2004	Kitt Peak	Spacewatch	·	1.9 km	MPC · JPL
460809	2014 WQ_{51}	—	February 2, 2006	Kitt Peak	Spacewatch	·	2.0 km	MPC · JPL
460810	2014 WV_{51}	—	September 18, 2009	Kitt Peak	Spacewatch	·	1.7 km	MPC · JPL
460811	2014 WW_{51}	—	December 13, 2006	Kitt Peak	Spacewatch	·	1.2 km	MPC · JPL
460812	2014 WZ_{51}	—	January 26, 2001	Kitt Peak	Spacewatch	KOR	1.8 km	MPC · JPL
460813	2014 WK_{52}	—	October 21, 2003	Kitt Peak	Spacewatch	·	2.1 km	MPC · JPL
460814	2014 WC_{53}	—	February 6, 2002	Kitt Peak	Spacewatch	AST	1.6 km	MPC · JPL
460815	2014 WN_{53}	—	March 28, 2011	Mount Lemmon	Mount Lemmon Survey	·	2.5 km	MPC · JPL
460816	2014 WS_{53}	—	March 13, 2005	Kitt Peak	Spacewatch	·	2.7 km	MPC · JPL
460817	2014 WU_{53}	—	March 16, 2005	Mount Lemmon	Mount Lemmon Survey	THM	2.3 km	MPC · JPL
460818	2014 WQ_{55}	—	November 18, 2008	Kitt Peak	Spacewatch	·	3.6 km	MPC · JPL
460819	2014 WT_{55}	—	October 1, 2000	Socorro	LINEAR	AEO	1.2 km	MPC · JPL
460820	2014 WG_{58}	—	September 15, 2009	Kitt Peak	Spacewatch	HOF	2.8 km	MPC · JPL
460821	2014 WJ_{60}	—	September 6, 2008	Mount Lemmon	Mount Lemmon Survey	·	2.0 km	MPC · JPL
460822	2014 WR_{61}	—	October 12, 2007	Mount Lemmon	Mount Lemmon Survey	·	930 m	MPC · JPL
460823	2014 WX_{61}	—	September 30, 2009	Mount Lemmon	Mount Lemmon Survey	·	2.4 km	MPC · JPL
460824	2014 WQ_{63}	—	September 25, 2009	Mount Lemmon	Mount Lemmon Survey	HOF	2.6 km	MPC · JPL
460825	2014 WY_{63}	—	September 11, 2005	Kitt Peak	Spacewatch	·	1.6 km	MPC · JPL
460826	2014 WA_{64}	—	September 19, 2009	Kitt Peak	Spacewatch	·	1.6 km	MPC · JPL
460827	2014 WB_{64}	—	March 29, 2008	Catalina	CSS	·	1.4 km	MPC · JPL
460828	2014 WS_{64}	—	October 28, 1997	Kitt Peak	Spacewatch	THM	1.6 km	MPC · JPL
460829	2014 WE_{65}	—	October 14, 2010	Mount Lemmon	Mount Lemmon Survey	·	1.1 km	MPC · JPL
460830	2014 WP_{65}	—	March 21, 2012	Mount Lemmon	Mount Lemmon Survey	·	1.6 km	MPC · JPL
460831	2014 WA_{68}	—	April 6, 2008	Mount Lemmon	Mount Lemmon Survey	·	1.2 km	MPC · JPL
460832	2014 WC_{68}	—	October 27, 2005	Kitt Peak	Spacewatch	·	1.5 km	MPC · JPL
460833	2014 WC_{69}	—	September 7, 2008	Mount Lemmon	Mount Lemmon Survey	·	1.9 km	MPC · JPL
460834	2014 WO_{72}	—	September 3, 1999	Kitt Peak	Spacewatch	·	1.7 km	MPC · JPL
460835	2014 WR_{72}	—	October 18, 2009	Mount Lemmon	Mount Lemmon Survey	EOS	1.3 km	MPC · JPL
460836	2014 WT_{73}	—	September 20, 2003	Anderson Mesa	LONEOS	·	2.8 km	MPC · JPL
460837	2014 WM_{81}	—	January 2, 2012	Kitt Peak	Spacewatch	·	1.1 km	MPC · JPL
460838	2014 WA_{82}	—	November 21, 2009	Kitt Peak	Spacewatch	·	2.5 km	MPC · JPL
460839	2014 WM_{82}	—	November 10, 2009	Kitt Peak	Spacewatch	EOS	1.6 km	MPC · JPL
460840	2014 WV_{83}	—	March 10, 2005	Mount Lemmon	Mount Lemmon Survey	NYS	1.2 km	MPC · JPL
460841	2014 WJ_{86}	—	November 2, 2008	Kitt Peak	Spacewatch	·	2.5 km	MPC · JPL
460842	2014 WF_{87}	—	December 24, 2005	Kitt Peak	Spacewatch	·	2.0 km	MPC · JPL
460843	2014 WB_{88}	—	November 5, 1999	Kitt Peak	Spacewatch	·	1.8 km	MPC · JPL
460844	2014 WA_{90}	—	October 26, 2009	Kitt Peak	Spacewatch	KOR	1.3 km	MPC · JPL
460845	2014 WV_{91}	—	October 27, 2008	Kitt Peak	Spacewatch	·	2.5 km	MPC · JPL
460846	2014 WH_{99}	—	April 11, 2003	Kitt Peak	Spacewatch	·	660 m	MPC · JPL
460847	2014 WZ_{100}	—	January 10, 2010	Mount Lemmon	Mount Lemmon Survey	·	3.7 km	MPC · JPL
460848	2014 WT_{101}	—	June 13, 2005	Mount Lemmon	Mount Lemmon Survey	·	1.0 km	MPC · JPL
460849	2014 WA_{103}	—	November 19, 2009	Kitt Peak	Spacewatch	·	3.1 km	MPC · JPL
460850	2014 WS_{103}	—	May 13, 2012	Mount Lemmon	Mount Lemmon Survey	·	2.0 km	MPC · JPL
460851	2014 WN_{105}	—	July 29, 2008	Mount Lemmon	Mount Lemmon Survey	·	2.1 km	MPC · JPL
460852	2014 WY_{105}	—	October 1, 2005	Kitt Peak	Spacewatch	·	1.5 km	MPC · JPL
460853	2014 WP_{106}	—	March 30, 2008	Kitt Peak	Spacewatch	·	1.4 km	MPC · JPL
460854	2014 WZ_{106}	—	November 24, 2009	Kitt Peak	Spacewatch	EOS	1.6 km	MPC · JPL
460855	2014 WS_{108}	—	September 17, 2009	Mount Lemmon	Mount Lemmon Survey	·	2.1 km	MPC · JPL
460856	2014 WP_{109}	—	April 20, 2012	Mount Lemmon	Mount Lemmon Survey	PAD	1.6 km	MPC · JPL
460857	2014 WS_{109}	—	April 30, 2006	Kitt Peak	Spacewatch	·	3.9 km	MPC · JPL
460858	2014 WV_{112}	—	October 23, 2006	Catalina	CSS	EUN	1.7 km	MPC · JPL
460859	2014 WP_{119}	—	May 1, 2006	Kitt Peak	Spacewatch	·	2.7 km	MPC · JPL
460860	2014 WD_{121}	—	September 16, 2003	Kitt Peak	Spacewatch	·	1.9 km	MPC · JPL
460861	2014 WH_{122}	—	September 16, 2003	Kitt Peak	Spacewatch	EOS	2.6 km	MPC · JPL
460862	2014 WX_{126}	—	August 21, 2006	Kitt Peak	Spacewatch	·	1.1 km	MPC · JPL
460863	2014 WY_{126}	—	October 24, 2008	Kitt Peak	Spacewatch	·	3.4 km	MPC · JPL
460864	2014 WH_{127}	—	December 28, 2003	Kitt Peak	Spacewatch	·	2.6 km	MPC · JPL
460865	2014 WL_{127}	—	October 15, 2007	Mount Lemmon	Mount Lemmon Survey	HYG	3.2 km	MPC · JPL
460866	2014 WS_{128}	—	September 12, 2004	Kitt Peak	Spacewatch	·	1.8 km	MPC · JPL
460867	2014 WD_{132}	—	September 28, 2009	Kitt Peak	Spacewatch	·	2.0 km	MPC · JPL
460868	2014 WQ_{132}	—	October 20, 2003	Kitt Peak	Spacewatch	HYG	2.5 km	MPC · JPL
460869	2014 WD_{136}	—	September 19, 2003	Kitt Peak	Spacewatch	EOS	1.5 km	MPC · JPL
460870	2014 WP_{136}	—	April 14, 2004	Kitt Peak	Spacewatch	·	1.2 km	MPC · JPL
460871	2014 WT_{136}	—	September 24, 2008	Mount Lemmon	Mount Lemmon Survey	EOS	2.0 km	MPC · JPL
460872	2014 WQ_{137}	—	September 24, 2008	Kitt Peak	Spacewatch	THM	2.0 km	MPC · JPL
460873	2014 WT_{137}	—	November 17, 2008	Kitt Peak	Spacewatch	CYB	4.0 km	MPC · JPL
460874	2014 WY_{137}	—	October 1, 2008	Mount Lemmon	Mount Lemmon Survey	·	2.6 km	MPC · JPL
460875	2014 WB_{138}	—	November 20, 2009	Kitt Peak	Spacewatch	·	1.5 km	MPC · JPL
460876	2014 WF_{139}	—	March 24, 2006	Mount Lemmon	Mount Lemmon Survey	·	3.1 km	MPC · JPL
460877	2014 WU_{140}	—	February 9, 2005	Kitt Peak	Spacewatch	THM	2.1 km	MPC · JPL
460878	2014 WQ_{141}	—	June 11, 2012	Mount Lemmon	Mount Lemmon Survey	·	1.7 km	MPC · JPL
460879	2014 WM_{144}	—	November 30, 2003	Kitt Peak	Spacewatch	·	3.3 km	MPC · JPL
460880	2014 WX_{150}	—	August 20, 2009	Kitt Peak	Spacewatch	·	1.6 km	MPC · JPL
460881	2014 WB_{151}	—	October 21, 2009	Mount Lemmon	Mount Lemmon Survey	·	2.0 km	MPC · JPL
460882	2014 WJ_{154}	—	September 18, 2009	Mount Lemmon	Mount Lemmon Survey	·	1.5 km	MPC · JPL
460883	2014 WW_{154}	—	October 28, 2005	Mount Lemmon	Mount Lemmon Survey	·	1.6 km	MPC · JPL
460884	2014 WN_{160}	—	November 11, 2009	Mount Lemmon	Mount Lemmon Survey	·	2.7 km	MPC · JPL
460885	2014 WS_{160}	—	February 21, 2007	Mount Lemmon	Mount Lemmon Survey	HOF	2.3 km	MPC · JPL
460886	2014 WQ_{162}	—	December 9, 2004	Kitt Peak	Spacewatch	·	2.7 km	MPC · JPL
460887	2014 WE_{163}	—	April 24, 2007	Kitt Peak	Spacewatch	·	2.4 km	MPC · JPL
460888	2014 WU_{163}	—	September 1, 2005	Kitt Peak	Spacewatch	·	1.3 km	MPC · JPL
460889	2014 WL_{164}	—	February 20, 2009	Mount Lemmon	Mount Lemmon Survey	·	810 m	MPC · JPL
460890	2014 WP_{164}	—	December 22, 2000	Kitt Peak	Spacewatch	·	2.0 km	MPC · JPL
460891	2014 WY_{165}	—	November 4, 2004	Kitt Peak	Spacewatch	·	1.8 km	MPC · JPL
460892	2014 WF_{168}	—	October 8, 2008	Kitt Peak	Spacewatch	·	2.6 km	MPC · JPL
460893	2014 WN_{169}	—	March 16, 2007	Kitt Peak	Spacewatch	·	2.4 km	MPC · JPL
460894	2014 WW_{169}	—	December 22, 2008	Kitt Peak	Spacewatch	·	970 m	MPC · JPL
460895	2014 WC_{170}	—	November 9, 2009	Mount Lemmon	Mount Lemmon Survey	·	3.6 km	MPC · JPL
460896	2014 WS_{179}	—	November 9, 2009	Kitt Peak	Spacewatch	·	4.8 km	MPC · JPL
460897	2014 WL_{180}	—	January 27, 2007	Mount Lemmon	Mount Lemmon Survey	·	2.3 km	MPC · JPL
460898	2014 WE_{181}	—	December 18, 2001	Kitt Peak	Spacewatch	WIT	1.0 km	MPC · JPL
460899	2014 WW_{181}	—	October 19, 2006	Mount Lemmon	Mount Lemmon Survey	·	1.2 km	MPC · JPL
460900	2014 WE_{183}	—	February 18, 2008	Mount Lemmon	Mount Lemmon Survey	·	1.2 km	MPC · JPL

== 460901–461000 ==
back to top

Designation			Discovery			Properties		Ref
Permanent	Provisional	Named after	Date	Site	Discoverer(s)	Category	Diam.	Ref
460901	2014 WM_{188}	—	March 27, 2008	Mount Lemmon	Mount Lemmon Survey	·	2.2 km	MPC · JPL
460902	2014 WP_{188}	—	November 17, 2006	Mount Lemmon	Mount Lemmon Survey	·	1.5 km	MPC · JPL
460903	2014 WO_{193}	—	August 17, 2009	Catalina	CSS	·	1.9 km	MPC · JPL
460904	2014 WX_{195}	—	September 9, 2008	Mount Lemmon	Mount Lemmon Survey	·	2.3 km	MPC · JPL
460905	2014 WK_{196}	—	December 17, 2009	Mount Lemmon	Mount Lemmon Survey	·	4.1 km	MPC · JPL
460906	2014 WX_{198}	—	August 10, 2007	Kitt Peak	Spacewatch	·	3.2 km	MPC · JPL
460907	2014 WD_{199}	—	September 24, 2008	Mount Lemmon	Mount Lemmon Survey	·	2.5 km	MPC · JPL
460908	2014 WZ_{199}	—	April 10, 2005	Kitt Peak	Spacewatch	·	3.6 km	MPC · JPL
460909	2014 WM_{206}	—	November 20, 2009	Kitt Peak	Spacewatch	EOS	2.2 km	MPC · JPL
460910	2014 WX_{212}	—	November 8, 2009	Mount Lemmon	Mount Lemmon Survey	·	1.8 km	MPC · JPL
460911	2014 WX_{213}	—	January 2, 2012	Mount Lemmon	Mount Lemmon Survey	·	1.5 km	MPC · JPL
460912	2014 WL_{214}	—	November 11, 2004	Kitt Peak	Spacewatch	·	5.1 km	MPC · JPL
460913	2014 WM_{214}	—	May 5, 2006	Kitt Peak	Spacewatch	·	1.1 km	MPC · JPL
460914	2014 WP_{214}	—	November 16, 2006	Mount Lemmon	Mount Lemmon Survey	·	1.6 km	MPC · JPL
460915	2014 WE_{216}	—	November 26, 2009	Mount Lemmon	Mount Lemmon Survey	·	4.2 km	MPC · JPL
460916	2014 WX_{216}	—	April 28, 2012	Mount Lemmon	Mount Lemmon Survey	·	3.4 km	MPC · JPL
460917	2014 WQ_{219}	—	December 2, 2005	Kitt Peak	Spacewatch	HOF	2.4 km	MPC · JPL
460918	2014 WS_{219}	—	November 16, 2009	Kitt Peak	Spacewatch	·	3.0 km	MPC · JPL
460919	2014 WB_{220}	—	October 23, 2005	Catalina	CSS	·	2.0 km	MPC · JPL
460920	2014 WN_{220}	—	October 30, 2005	Kitt Peak	Spacewatch	PAD	1.7 km	MPC · JPL
460921	2014 WQ_{221}	—	November 10, 2009	Kitt Peak	Spacewatch	·	2.7 km	MPC · JPL
460922	2014 WB_{224}	—	October 24, 2009	Kitt Peak	Spacewatch	KOR	1.3 km	MPC · JPL
460923	2014 WD_{224}	—	September 5, 2003	Campo Imperatore	CINEOS	·	2.7 km	MPC · JPL
460924	2014 WO_{225}	—	October 9, 2008	Kitt Peak	Spacewatch	·	3.0 km	MPC · JPL
460925	2014 WO_{226}	—	November 17, 2009	Kitt Peak	Spacewatch	·	1.5 km	MPC · JPL
460926	2014 WY_{226}	—	October 31, 2008	Mount Lemmon	Mount Lemmon Survey	·	3.8 km	MPC · JPL
460927	2014 WY_{228}	—	January 29, 2011	Kitt Peak	Spacewatch	·	1.5 km	MPC · JPL
460928	2014 WM_{230}	—	October 20, 2003	Kitt Peak	Spacewatch	EOS	1.9 km	MPC · JPL
460929	2014 WO_{230}	—	November 26, 2003	Kitt Peak	Spacewatch	·	3.1 km	MPC · JPL
460930	2014 WJ_{231}	—	March 8, 2008	Mount Lemmon	Mount Lemmon Survey	(5)	1.3 km	MPC · JPL
460931	2014 WA_{232}	—	September 17, 2009	Catalina	CSS	·	2.7 km	MPC · JPL
460932	2014 WV_{232}	—	December 2, 2005	Mount Lemmon	Mount Lemmon Survey	·	2.0 km	MPC · JPL
460933	2014 WG_{234}	—	September 17, 2009	Kitt Peak	Spacewatch	WIT	1.3 km	MPC · JPL
460934	2014 WM_{234}	—	September 15, 2004	Kitt Peak	Spacewatch	·	1.9 km	MPC · JPL
460935	2014 WP_{237}	—	January 6, 2010	Kitt Peak	Spacewatch	CYB	3.1 km	MPC · JPL
460936	2014 WS_{239}	—	December 15, 2006	Kitt Peak	Spacewatch	·	1.5 km	MPC · JPL
460937	2014 WW_{241}	—	March 11, 2005	Mount Lemmon	Mount Lemmon Survey	·	2.4 km	MPC · JPL
460938	2014 WT_{249}	—	April 15, 2008	Mount Lemmon	Mount Lemmon Survey	·	2.2 km	MPC · JPL
460939	2014 WU_{252}	—	December 27, 2006	Mount Lemmon	Mount Lemmon Survey	WIT	950 m	MPC · JPL
460940	2014 WB_{254}	—	December 17, 2009	Kitt Peak	Spacewatch	EOS	2.0 km	MPC · JPL
460941	2014 WS_{254}	—	March 11, 2011	Kitt Peak	Spacewatch	·	2.0 km	MPC · JPL
460942	2014 WN_{258}	—	March 14, 2007	Kitt Peak	Spacewatch	·	1.9 km	MPC · JPL
460943	2014 WA_{259}	—	April 30, 2006	Kitt Peak	Spacewatch	·	2.3 km	MPC · JPL
460944	2014 WV_{259}	—	October 26, 2005	Kitt Peak	Spacewatch	·	2.0 km	MPC · JPL
460945	2014 WX_{259}	—	March 4, 2005	Mount Lemmon	Mount Lemmon Survey	·	2.9 km	MPC · JPL
460946	2014 WB_{261}	—	May 28, 2008	Kitt Peak	Spacewatch	·	1.7 km	MPC · JPL
460947	2014 WK_{262}	—	October 29, 2008	Kitt Peak	Spacewatch	VER	2.3 km	MPC · JPL
460948	2014 WR_{262}	—	April 5, 2011	Kitt Peak	Spacewatch	·	2.0 km	MPC · JPL
460949	2014 WG_{266}	—	September 11, 2004	Kitt Peak	Spacewatch	·	2.0 km	MPC · JPL
460950	2014 WV_{267}	—	October 20, 2007	Kitt Peak	Spacewatch	SYL · CYB	4.0 km	MPC · JPL
460951	2014 WX_{267}	—	October 25, 2005	Kitt Peak	Spacewatch	·	1.7 km	MPC · JPL
460952	2014 WZ_{267}	—	April 1, 2010	WISE	WISE	·	4.3 km	MPC · JPL
460953	2014 WO_{269}	—	October 17, 2007	Mount Lemmon	Mount Lemmon Survey	V	640 m	MPC · JPL
460954	2014 WB_{270}	—	December 21, 2005	Kitt Peak	Spacewatch	·	1.8 km	MPC · JPL
460955	2014 WM_{270}	—	December 18, 2009	Mount Lemmon	Mount Lemmon Survey	·	2.9 km	MPC · JPL
460956	2014 WT_{273}	—	May 19, 2012	Mount Lemmon	Mount Lemmon Survey	·	3.6 km	MPC · JPL
460957	2014 WB_{274}	—	November 27, 2009	Kitt Peak	Spacewatch	EOS	1.8 km	MPC · JPL
460958	2014 WN_{275}	—	March 24, 2006	Mount Lemmon	Mount Lemmon Survey	·	3.2 km	MPC · JPL
460959	2014 WN_{279}	—	April 18, 2010	WISE	WISE	·	4.5 km	MPC · JPL
460960	2014 WP_{280}	—	March 17, 2010	WISE	WISE	·	3.4 km	MPC · JPL
460961	2014 WL_{281}	—	October 16, 2009	Mount Lemmon	Mount Lemmon Survey	HOF	2.1 km	MPC · JPL
460962	2014 WV_{287}	—	November 23, 2009	Mount Lemmon	Mount Lemmon Survey	·	3.4 km	MPC · JPL
460963	2014 WY_{288}	—	May 14, 2012	Kitt Peak	Spacewatch	·	2.5 km	MPC · JPL
460964	2014 WK_{290}	—	April 23, 2004	Kitt Peak	Spacewatch	EUN	1.4 km	MPC · JPL
460965	2014 WL_{292}	—	February 14, 2005	Kitt Peak	Spacewatch	EMA	2.9 km	MPC · JPL
460966	2014 WR_{295}	—	May 16, 2007	Mount Lemmon	Mount Lemmon Survey	NAE	2.4 km	MPC · JPL
460967	2014 WD_{297}	—	January 6, 2010	Mount Lemmon	Mount Lemmon Survey	·	3.4 km	MPC · JPL
460968	2014 WP_{298}	—	May 3, 2010	WISE	WISE	·	2.8 km	MPC · JPL
460969	2014 WS_{302}	—	September 9, 2008	Mount Lemmon	Mount Lemmon Survey	·	3.0 km	MPC · JPL
460970	2014 WZ_{311}	—	May 3, 2003	Kitt Peak	Spacewatch	·	630 m	MPC · JPL
460971	2014 WY_{314}	—	January 19, 2012	Kitt Peak	Spacewatch	V	730 m	MPC · JPL
460972	2014 WN_{320}	—	April 15, 2008	Mount Lemmon	Mount Lemmon Survey	·	2.4 km	MPC · JPL
460973	2014 WB_{321}	—	March 25, 2007	Mount Lemmon	Mount Lemmon Survey	·	2.2 km	MPC · JPL
460974	2014 WO_{322}	—	December 2, 2010	Kitt Peak	Spacewatch	·	1.6 km	MPC · JPL
460975	2014 WW_{322}	—	May 5, 2010	WISE	WISE	CYB	4.5 km	MPC · JPL
460976	2014 WX_{325}	—	May 31, 2006	Kitt Peak	Spacewatch	·	3.4 km	MPC · JPL
460977	2014 WS_{326}	—	February 4, 2005	Kitt Peak	Spacewatch	EOS	2.2 km	MPC · JPL
460978	2014 WP_{327}	—	November 17, 2009	Mount Lemmon	Mount Lemmon Survey	·	3.5 km	MPC · JPL
460979	2014 WP_{328}	—	July 30, 2008	Mount Lemmon	Mount Lemmon Survey	·	2.5 km	MPC · JPL
460980	2014 WU_{330}	—	September 21, 2008	Mount Lemmon	Mount Lemmon Survey	EOS	1.5 km	MPC · JPL
460981	2014 WW_{330}	—	May 9, 2006	Mount Lemmon	Mount Lemmon Survey	·	3.8 km	MPC · JPL
460982	2014 WO_{334}	—	December 10, 2009	Mount Lemmon	Mount Lemmon Survey	·	2.9 km	MPC · JPL
460983	2014 WT_{335}	—	November 23, 2009	Kitt Peak	Spacewatch	·	3.8 km	MPC · JPL
460984	2014 WL_{336}	—	April 13, 2012	Kitt Peak	Spacewatch	·	3.9 km	MPC · JPL
460985	2014 WW_{339}	—	March 5, 2011	Mount Lemmon	Mount Lemmon Survey	EOS	1.9 km	MPC · JPL
460986	2014 WF_{340}	—	March 29, 2010	WISE	WISE	·	2.9 km	MPC · JPL
460987	2014 WO_{340}	—	December 17, 2009	Mount Lemmon	Mount Lemmon Survey	·	3.2 km	MPC · JPL
460988	2014 WP_{340}	—	March 9, 2011	Mount Lemmon	Mount Lemmon Survey	EOS	2.0 km	MPC · JPL
460989	2014 WH_{346}	—	September 13, 2005	Kitt Peak	Spacewatch	·	1.6 km	MPC · JPL
460990	2014 WP_{346}	—	January 21, 2009	Mount Lemmon	Mount Lemmon Survey	CYB	5.5 km	MPC · JPL
460991	2014 WU_{346}	—	March 3, 2006	Mount Lemmon	Mount Lemmon Survey	EOS	2.0 km	MPC · JPL
460992	2014 WW_{347}	—	January 8, 2010	Mount Lemmon	Mount Lemmon Survey	·	3.6 km	MPC · JPL
460993	2014 WB_{349}	—	December 14, 2004	Kitt Peak	Spacewatch	·	3.9 km	MPC · JPL
460994	2014 WP_{349}	—	January 13, 2005	Kitt Peak	Spacewatch	EOS	1.9 km	MPC · JPL
460995	2014 WE_{350}	—	September 18, 2009	Kitt Peak	Spacewatch	MRX	1.3 km	MPC · JPL
460996	2014 WX_{352}	—	September 23, 2009	Mount Lemmon	Mount Lemmon Survey	·	2.0 km	MPC · JPL
460997	2014 WM_{356}	—	March 13, 2007	Kitt Peak	Spacewatch	·	1.9 km	MPC · JPL
460998	2014 WV_{357}	—	March 11, 2005	Catalina	CSS	·	3.9 km	MPC · JPL
460999	2014 WF_{358}	—	December 20, 2009	Mount Lemmon	Mount Lemmon Survey	·	3.7 km	MPC · JPL
461000	2014 WL_{361}	—	September 5, 2008	Kitt Peak	Spacewatch	·	2.8 km	MPC · JPL

back to top
