= List of minor planets: 576001–577000 =

The following is a partial list of minor planets, running from minor-planet number 576001 through 577000, inclusive. The primary data for this and other partial lists is based on JPL's "Small-Body Orbital Elements" and data available from the Minor Planet Center. Critical list information is also provided by the MPC, unless otherwise specified from Lowell Observatory. A detailed description of the table's columns and additional sources are given on the main page including a complete list of every page in this series, and a statistical break-up on the dynamical classification of minor planets.

Also see the summary list of all named bodies in numerical and alphabetical order, and the corresponding naming citations for the number range of this particular list. New namings may only be added to this list after official publication, as the preannouncement of names is condemned by the Working Group for Small Bodies Nomenclature of the International Astronomical Union.

Near-Earth obj.	MBA (inner)	MBA (outer)	Centaur
Mars-crosser	MBA (middle)	Jupiter trojan	Trans-Neptunian obj.
Unclassified

== 576001–576100 ==
Designation			Discovery			Properties		Ref
Permanent	Provisional	Named after	Date	Site	Discoverer(s)	Category	Diam.	Ref
576001	2012 BQ_{60}	—	January 24, 2012	Haleakala	Pan-STARRS 1	H	410 m	MPC · JPL
576002	2012 BM_{66}	—	June 2, 2006	Kitt Peak	Spacewatch	PHO	1.2 km	MPC · JPL
576003	2012 BP_{76}	—	December 30, 2011	Kitt Peak	Spacewatch	·	1.1 km	MPC · JPL
576004	2012 BW_{76}	—	January 3, 2012	Mount Lemmon	Mount Lemmon Survey	H	320 m	MPC · JPL
576005	2012 BH_{80}	—	December 4, 2007	Kitt Peak	Spacewatch	·	1.3 km	MPC · JPL
576006	2012 BZ_{80}	—	January 27, 2012	Mount Lemmon	Mount Lemmon Survey	·	2.7 km	MPC · JPL
576007	2012 BY_{81}	—	January 27, 2012	Mount Lemmon	Mount Lemmon Survey	·	940 m	MPC · JPL
576008	2012 BR_{83}	—	January 18, 2012	Kitt Peak	Spacewatch	·	1.2 km	MPC · JPL
576009	2012 BZ_{85}	—	July 10, 2005	Kitt Peak	Spacewatch	H	460 m	MPC · JPL
576010	2012 BU_{88}	—	January 26, 2012	Kitt Peak	Spacewatch	·	790 m	MPC · JPL
576011	2012 BY_{94}	—	January 27, 2012	Mount Lemmon	Mount Lemmon Survey	·	2.9 km	MPC · JPL
576012	2012 BS_{99}	—	February 2, 2005	Kitt Peak	Spacewatch	·	820 m	MPC · JPL
576013	2012 BM_{101}	—	January 27, 2012	Mount Lemmon	Mount Lemmon Survey	·	2.7 km	MPC · JPL
576014	2012 BU_{102}	—	November 26, 2011	Mount Lemmon	Mount Lemmon Survey	NYS	1.2 km	MPC · JPL
576015	2012 BZ_{102}	—	January 3, 2012	Kitt Peak	Spacewatch	·	1.1 km	MPC · JPL
576016	2012 BP_{104}	—	January 21, 2012	Haleakala	Pan-STARRS 1	H	600 m	MPC · JPL
576017	2012 BD_{105}	—	January 26, 2012	Kitt Peak	Spacewatch	H	420 m	MPC · JPL
576018	2012 BL_{107}	—	November 28, 2011	Mount Lemmon	Mount Lemmon Survey	TIR	2.4 km	MPC · JPL
576019	2012 BY_{108}	—	February 11, 2008	Kitt Peak	Spacewatch	·	670 m	MPC · JPL
576020	2012 BG_{121}	—	February 17, 2001	Haleakala	NEAT	H	650 m	MPC · JPL
576021	2012 BP_{122}	—	September 22, 2009	Bergisch Gladbach	W. Bickel	·	2.0 km	MPC · JPL
576022	2012 BH_{123}	—	March 10, 2005	Mount Lemmon	Mount Lemmon Survey	·	1.2 km	MPC · JPL
576023	2012 BO_{127}	—	December 24, 2011	Mount Lemmon	Mount Lemmon Survey	V	600 m	MPC · JPL
576024	2012 BV_{127}	—	January 26, 2012	Mount Lemmon	Mount Lemmon Survey	·	1.3 km	MPC · JPL
576025	2012 BU_{128}	—	January 31, 2012	Mount Lemmon	Mount Lemmon Survey	·	1.1 km	MPC · JPL
576026	2012 BV_{130}	—	March 19, 2001	Apache Point	SDSS	·	1.1 km	MPC · JPL
576027	2012 BN_{135}	—	December 30, 2011	Kitt Peak	Spacewatch	·	3.0 km	MPC · JPL
576028	2012 BQ_{139}	—	January 29, 2012	Haleakala	Pan-STARRS 1	·	1.9 km	MPC · JPL
576029	2012 BS_{140}	—	January 1, 2012	Mount Lemmon	Mount Lemmon Survey	EOS	2.0 km	MPC · JPL
576030	2012 BU_{140}	—	January 18, 2012	Mount Lemmon	Mount Lemmon Survey	EOS	1.5 km	MPC · JPL
576031	2012 BG_{141}	—	April 16, 2005	Kitt Peak	Spacewatch	·	1.3 km	MPC · JPL
576032	2012 BV_{143}	—	January 25, 2012	Haleakala	Pan-STARRS 1	H	500 m	MPC · JPL
576033	2012 BH_{144}	—	October 29, 2005	Mount Lemmon	Mount Lemmon Survey	THM	2.7 km	MPC · JPL
576034	2012 BY_{144}	—	January 26, 2012	Mount Lemmon	Mount Lemmon Survey	EOS	1.8 km	MPC · JPL
576035	2012 BE_{154}	—	April 9, 2008	Kitt Peak	Spacewatch	·	2.9 km	MPC · JPL
576036	2012 BV_{155}	—	January 26, 2012	Mount Lemmon	Mount Lemmon Survey	H	320 m	MPC · JPL
576037	2012 BA_{161}	—	August 22, 2014	Haleakala	Pan-STARRS 1	·	1.2 km	MPC · JPL
576038	2012 BE_{161}	—	July 12, 2015	Haleakala	Pan-STARRS 1	·	3.1 km	MPC · JPL
576039	2012 BZ_{161}	—	March 24, 2015	Mount Lemmon	Mount Lemmon Survey	H	500 m	MPC · JPL
576040	2012 BY_{165}	—	February 29, 2008	Kitt Peak	Spacewatch	·	1.2 km	MPC · JPL
576041	2012 BC_{169}	—	January 18, 2012	Mount Lemmon	Mount Lemmon Survey	·	2.7 km	MPC · JPL
576042	2012 BZ_{170}	—	June 2, 2014	Haleakala	Pan-STARRS 1	BRA	1.3 km	MPC · JPL
576043	2012 BV_{172}	—	August 28, 2013	Catalina	CSS	H	520 m	MPC · JPL
576044	2012 BW_{173}	—	January 21, 2012	Kitt Peak	Spacewatch	SYL	3.2 km	MPC · JPL
576045	2012 BG_{175}	—	January 19, 2012	Haleakala	Pan-STARRS 1	H	340 m	MPC · JPL
576046	2012 BK_{176}	—	January 26, 2012	Haleakala	Pan-STARRS 1	·	1.1 km	MPC · JPL
576047	2012 BL_{176}	—	January 19, 2012	Haleakala	Pan-STARRS 1	·	3.5 km	MPC · JPL
576048	2012 BM_{179}	—	January 27, 2012	Mount Lemmon	Mount Lemmon Survey	·	560 m	MPC · JPL
576049	2012 CW_{5}	—	January 19, 2008	Mount Lemmon	Mount Lemmon Survey	·	1.7 km	MPC · JPL
576050	2012 CH_{6}	—	November 18, 2007	Mount Lemmon	Mount Lemmon Survey	V	740 m	MPC · JPL
576051	2012 CE_{10}	—	February 1, 2012	Kitt Peak	Spacewatch	NYS	740 m	MPC · JPL
576052	2012 CE_{11}	—	March 20, 2002	Kitt Peak	Spacewatch	·	600 m	MPC · JPL
576053	2012 CX_{11}	—	February 1, 2012	Bergisch Gladbach	W. Bickel	·	940 m	MPC · JPL
576054	2012 CU_{15}	—	February 3, 2012	Haleakala	Pan-STARRS 1	·	520 m	MPC · JPL
576055	2012 CN_{25}	—	January 29, 2012	Kitt Peak	Spacewatch	·	3.4 km	MPC · JPL
576056	2012 CW_{25}	—	October 12, 2010	Catalina	CSS	·	3.5 km	MPC · JPL
576057	2012 CK_{26}	—	January 26, 2012	Haleakala	Pan-STARRS 1	·	1.2 km	MPC · JPL
576058	2012 CT_{26}	—	February 2, 2008	Mount Lemmon	Mount Lemmon Survey	PHO	1.2 km	MPC · JPL
576059	2012 CA_{28}	—	February 13, 2012	Haleakala	Pan-STARRS 1	·	980 m	MPC · JPL
576060	2012 CT_{28}	—	February 1, 2012	Kitt Peak	Spacewatch	VER	2.4 km	MPC · JPL
576061	2012 CN_{30}	—	October 6, 2007	Bergisch Gladbach	W. Bickel	·	1.0 km	MPC · JPL
576062	2012 CF_{31}	—	December 16, 2007	Mount Lemmon	Mount Lemmon Survey	·	1.3 km	MPC · JPL
576063	2012 CK_{31}	—	October 14, 2007	Mount Lemmon	Mount Lemmon Survey	·	810 m	MPC · JPL
576064	2012 CY_{40}	—	January 21, 2012	Kitt Peak	Spacewatch	H	440 m	MPC · JPL
576065	2012 CD_{41}	—	January 17, 2007	Kitt Peak	Spacewatch	AGN	1.1 km	MPC · JPL
576066	2012 CZ_{41}	—	March 5, 2008	Mount Lemmon	Mount Lemmon Survey	(5)	860 m	MPC · JPL
576067	2012 CK_{45}	—	September 26, 2003	Apache Point	SDSS Collaboration	NYS	1.1 km	MPC · JPL
576068	2012 CN_{47}	—	February 13, 2012	Kitt Peak	Spacewatch	H	410 m	MPC · JPL
576069	2012 CJ_{48}	—	October 27, 2003	Anderson Mesa	LONEOS	·	1.6 km	MPC · JPL
576070	2012 CM_{55}	—	April 14, 2008	Mount Lemmon	Mount Lemmon Survey	(31811)	2.8 km	MPC · JPL
576071	2012 CD_{63}	—	January 20, 2018	Haleakala	Pan-STARRS 1	·	2.6 km	MPC · JPL
576072	2012 CR_{66}	—	February 15, 2012	Haleakala	Pan-STARRS 1	·	1.1 km	MPC · JPL
576073	2012 CL_{68}	—	February 14, 2012	Haleakala	Pan-STARRS 1	VER	2.1 km	MPC · JPL
576074	2012 DA_{1}	—	January 21, 2012	Haleakala	Pan-STARRS 1	·	1.1 km	MPC · JPL
576075	2012 DE_{4}	—	February 19, 2012	Charleston	R. Holmes	PHO	910 m	MPC · JPL
576076	2012 DP_{6}	—	February 18, 2012	Kachina	Hobart, J.	MAR	900 m	MPC · JPL
576077	2012 DP_{9}	—	January 30, 2008	Mount Lemmon	Mount Lemmon Survey	·	860 m	MPC · JPL
576078	2012 DV_{9}	—	February 16, 2012	Haleakala	Pan-STARRS 1	H	430 m	MPC · JPL
576079	2012 DQ_{11}	—	February 19, 2012	Kitt Peak	Spacewatch	·	940 m	MPC · JPL
576080	2012 DN_{17}	—	January 31, 2012	Mayhill-ISON	L. Elenin	PHO	1.1 km	MPC · JPL
576081	2012 DZ_{19}	—	January 19, 2008	Mount Lemmon	Mount Lemmon Survey	·	1.6 km	MPC · JPL
576082	2012 DY_{31}	—	February 24, 2012	Kitt Peak	Spacewatch	H	430 m	MPC · JPL
576083	2012 DK_{33}	—	February 21, 2012	Kitt Peak	Spacewatch	·	1.7 km	MPC · JPL
576084	2012 DD_{34}	—	February 23, 2012	Kitt Peak	Spacewatch	·	950 m	MPC · JPL
576085	2012 DF_{47}	—	February 22, 2012	Kitt Peak	Spacewatch	·	470 m	MPC · JPL
576086	2012 DD_{51}	—	January 18, 2012	Mount Lemmon	Mount Lemmon Survey	·	1.1 km	MPC · JPL
576087	2012 DA_{54}	—	January 2, 2012	Siding Spring	SSS	H	650 m	MPC · JPL
576088	2012 DW_{59}	—	February 25, 2012	Catalina	CSS	·	1.3 km	MPC · JPL
576089	2012 DL_{64}	—	February 24, 2012	Mount Lemmon	Mount Lemmon Survey	V	460 m	MPC · JPL
576090	2012 DC_{66}	—	March 10, 2005	Mount Lemmon	Mount Lemmon Survey	MAS	640 m	MPC · JPL
576091	2012 DU_{72}	—	August 28, 2005	Kitt Peak	Spacewatch	·	1.0 km	MPC · JPL
576092	2012 DT_{76}	—	January 31, 2012	Mayhill-ISON	L. Elenin	H	560 m	MPC · JPL
576093	2012 DF_{90}	—	May 6, 2008	Siding Spring	SSS	·	2.0 km	MPC · JPL
576094	2012 DT_{96}	—	February 14, 2012	Haleakala	Pan-STARRS 1	·	2.4 km	MPC · JPL
576095	2012 DU_{96}	—	February 14, 2012	Haleakala	Pan-STARRS 1	·	2.4 km	MPC · JPL
576096	2012 DR_{100}	—	March 5, 2008	Mount Lemmon	Mount Lemmon Survey	·	710 m	MPC · JPL
576097	2012 DR_{105}	—	February 28, 2012	Haleakala	Pan-STARRS 1	AEO	1 km	MPC · JPL
576098	2012 DC_{108}	—	February 27, 2012	Haleakala	Pan-STARRS 1	·	900 m	MPC · JPL
576099	2012 DP_{109}	—	April 30, 2004	Kitt Peak	Spacewatch	·	860 m	MPC · JPL
576100	2012 DG_{111}	—	February 21, 2012	Mount Lemmon	Mount Lemmon Survey	·	1.2 km	MPC · JPL

== 576101–576200 ==
back to top

Designation			Discovery			Properties		Ref
Permanent	Provisional	Named after	Date	Site	Discoverer(s)	Category	Diam.	Ref
576101	2012 DD_{112}	—	February 28, 2012	Haleakala	Pan-STARRS 1	3:2	4.4 km	MPC · JPL
576102	2012 DQ_{113}	—	February 20, 2012	Kitt Peak	Spacewatch	·	780 m	MPC · JPL
576103	2012 DQ_{118}	—	February 25, 2012	Kitt Peak	Spacewatch	·	600 m	MPC · JPL
576104	2012 DH_{121}	—	February 24, 2012	Mount Lemmon	Mount Lemmon Survey	JUN	830 m	MPC · JPL
576105	2012 DS_{121}	—	February 25, 2012	Mount Lemmon	Mount Lemmon Survey	·	2.5 km	MPC · JPL
576106	2012 EK	—	January 19, 2012	Mount Lemmon	Mount Lemmon Survey	·	3.3 km	MPC · JPL
576107	2012 ED_{7}	—	September 27, 2002	Palomar	NEAT	·	1.8 km	MPC · JPL
576108	2012 EH_{7}	—	January 19, 2004	Kitt Peak	Spacewatch	PHO	810 m	MPC · JPL
576109	2012 EC_{8}	—	November 20, 2006	Kitt Peak	Spacewatch	·	1.2 km	MPC · JPL
576110	2012 ER_{9}	—	March 14, 2012	Haleakala	Pan-STARRS 1	·	2.2 km	MPC · JPL
576111	2012 EV_{9}	—	April 25, 2004	Apache Point	SDSS Collaboration	H	600 m	MPC · JPL
576112	2012 ET_{10}	—	February 25, 2012	Kitt Peak	Spacewatch	·	790 m	MPC · JPL
576113	2012 EV_{13}	—	March 15, 2012	Mount Lemmon	Mount Lemmon Survey	EOS	1.5 km	MPC · JPL
576114	2012 EW_{13}	—	August 27, 2005	Palomar	NEAT	·	960 m	MPC · JPL
576115	2012 EN_{14}	—	March 15, 2012	Kitt Peak	T. Vorobjov	·	3.6 km	MPC · JPL
576116	2012 EH_{21}	—	March 14, 2012	Kitt Peak	Spacewatch	·	1 km	MPC · JPL
576117	2012 EM_{22}	—	March 15, 2012	Mount Lemmon	Mount Lemmon Survey	·	700 m	MPC · JPL
576118	2012 EP_{24}	—	July 13, 2013	Haleakala	Pan-STARRS 1	·	880 m	MPC · JPL
576119	2012 ED_{25}	—	March 13, 2012	Mount Lemmon	Mount Lemmon Survey	·	940 m	MPC · JPL
576120	2012 EY_{25}	—	March 15, 2012	Mount Lemmon	Mount Lemmon Survey	·	680 m	MPC · JPL
576121	2012 EP_{26}	—	March 15, 2012	Mount Lemmon	Mount Lemmon Survey	·	870 m	MPC · JPL
576122	2012 FT_{2}	—	April 30, 2009	Kitt Peak	Spacewatch	·	530 m	MPC · JPL
576123	2012 FZ_{3}	—	September 19, 2009	Mount Lemmon	Mount Lemmon Survey	·	1.6 km	MPC · JPL
576124	2012 FH_{4}	—	March 16, 2012	Mount Lemmon	Mount Lemmon Survey	·	1.2 km	MPC · JPL
576125	2012 FV_{11}	—	March 9, 2008	Kitt Peak	Spacewatch	·	940 m	MPC · JPL
576126	2012 FL_{14}	—	March 16, 2012	Piszkéstető	K. Sárneczky	·	1.3 km	MPC · JPL
576127	2012 FX_{24}	—	March 17, 2012	Mount Lemmon	Mount Lemmon Survey	·	640 m	MPC · JPL
576128	2012 FO_{27}	—	March 22, 2012	Mount Lemmon	Mount Lemmon Survey	·	1.4 km	MPC · JPL
576129	2012 FY_{29}	—	March 23, 2012	Mount Lemmon	Mount Lemmon Survey	ADE	1.7 km	MPC · JPL
576130	2012 FC_{43}	—	March 25, 2012	Marly	P. Kocher	(5)	1.5 km	MPC · JPL
576131	2012 FN_{50}	—	February 28, 2012	Haleakala	Pan-STARRS 1	·	1.0 km	MPC · JPL
576132	2012 FG_{54}	—	November 27, 2010	Mount Lemmon	Mount Lemmon Survey	·	1.0 km	MPC · JPL
576133	2012 FS_{60}	—	March 27, 2012	Mount Lemmon	Mount Lemmon Survey	·	890 m	MPC · JPL
576134	2012 FK_{66}	—	February 28, 2012	Haleakala	Pan-STARRS 1	·	950 m	MPC · JPL
576135	2012 FL_{71}	—	March 30, 2008	Catalina	CSS	·	1.1 km	MPC · JPL
576136	2012 FY_{71}	—	March 29, 2012	Haleakala	Pan-STARRS 1	·	830 m	MPC · JPL
576137	2012 FK_{73}	—	October 3, 2005	Kitt Peak	Spacewatch	·	2.2 km	MPC · JPL
576138	2012 FC_{86}	—	December 24, 2006	Kitt Peak	Spacewatch	·	1.0 km	MPC · JPL
576139	2012 FQ_{87}	—	February 26, 2015	Mount Lemmon	Mount Lemmon Survey	·	740 m	MPC · JPL
576140	2012 FW_{87}	—	March 16, 2012	Mount Lemmon	Mount Lemmon Survey	(5)	1.1 km	MPC · JPL
576141	2012 FX_{87}	—	April 16, 2008	Mount Lemmon	Mount Lemmon Survey	·	1.1 km	MPC · JPL
576142	2012 FY_{87}	—	September 7, 2004	Kitt Peak	Spacewatch	·	1.2 km	MPC · JPL
576143	2012 FR_{88}	—	March 27, 2012	Mount Lemmon	Mount Lemmon Survey	(1547)	1.1 km	MPC · JPL
576144	2012 FD_{90}	—	March 27, 2012	Mount Lemmon	Mount Lemmon Survey	KON	2.0 km	MPC · JPL
576145	2012 FO_{93}	—	March 25, 2012	Mount Lemmon	Mount Lemmon Survey	·	1.1 km	MPC · JPL
576146	2012 FJ_{95}	—	August 30, 2014	Haleakala	Pan-STARRS 1	EUN	850 m	MPC · JPL
576147	2012 FL_{101}	—	March 28, 2012	Kitt Peak	Spacewatch	·	1.0 km	MPC · JPL
576148	2012 FY_{105}	—	March 29, 2012	Kitt Peak	Spacewatch	·	1.4 km	MPC · JPL
576149	2012 GL	—	April 2, 2012	Catalina	CSS	BAR	970 m	MPC · JPL
576150	2012 GB_{9}	—	April 11, 2008	Mount Lemmon	Mount Lemmon Survey	·	860 m	MPC · JPL
576151	2012 GV_{9}	—	September 24, 2009	Kitt Peak	Spacewatch	KON	2.1 km	MPC · JPL
576152	2012 GT_{10}	—	February 26, 2012	Kitt Peak	Spacewatch	·	1.1 km	MPC · JPL
576153	2012 GD_{17}	—	May 1, 2008	Kitt Peak	Spacewatch	EUN	1.0 km	MPC · JPL
576154	2012 GP_{17}	—	April 15, 2012	Haleakala	Pan-STARRS 1	ADE	1.9 km	MPC · JPL
576155	2012 GE_{18}	—	April 3, 2008	Kitt Peak	Spacewatch	·	1.1 km	MPC · JPL
576156	2012 GV_{20}	—	April 15, 2012	Haleakala	Pan-STARRS 1	·	990 m	MPC · JPL
576157	2012 GH_{21}	—	July 20, 2004	Siding Spring	SSS	·	1.6 km	MPC · JPL
576158	2012 GC_{29}	—	April 15, 2012	Haleakala	Pan-STARRS 1	EUN	850 m	MPC · JPL
576159	2012 GF_{30}	—	April 11, 2012	Mount Lemmon	Mount Lemmon Survey	·	640 m	MPC · JPL
576160	2012 GL_{37}	—	April 1, 2008	Kitt Peak	Spacewatch	EUN	860 m	MPC · JPL
576161	2012 GN_{37}	—	September 20, 2003	Kitt Peak	Spacewatch	·	2.5 km	MPC · JPL
576162	2012 GT_{41}	—	April 2, 2012	Haleakala	Pan-STARRS 1	centaur	70 km	MPC · JPL
576163	2012 GU_{41}	—	October 5, 2013	Haleakala	Pan-STARRS 1	·	1.1 km	MPC · JPL
576164	2012 GH_{42}	—	April 3, 2016	Haleakala	Pan-STARRS 1	BRG	1.3 km	MPC · JPL
576165	2012 GL_{42}	—	April 15, 2012	Haleakala	Pan-STARRS 1	·	1.7 km	MPC · JPL
576166	2012 GO_{42}	—	April 13, 2012	Siding Spring	SSS	·	1.0 km	MPC · JPL
576167	2012 GC_{43}	—	January 8, 2016	Haleakala	Pan-STARRS 1	·	1.1 km	MPC · JPL
576168	2012 GO_{44}	—	August 31, 2014	Haleakala	Pan-STARRS 1	·	2.3 km	MPC · JPL
576169	2012 GZ_{45}	—	June 21, 2017	Haleakala	Pan-STARRS 1	PHO	890 m	MPC · JPL
576170	2012 GZ_{48}	—	April 1, 2012	Mount Lemmon	Mount Lemmon Survey	·	850 m	MPC · JPL
576171	2012 HK_{1}	—	April 16, 2012	Haleakala	Pan-STARRS 1	H	460 m	MPC · JPL
576172	2012 HZ_{2}	—	December 31, 2011	Mount Lemmon	Mount Lemmon Survey	·	1.6 km	MPC · JPL
576173	2012 HC_{3}	—	April 16, 2012	Kitt Peak	Spacewatch	·	1.2 km	MPC · JPL
576174	2012 HJ_{3}	—	August 6, 2004	Palomar	NEAT	·	1.3 km	MPC · JPL
576175	2012 HC_{10}	—	February 21, 2012	Mount Lemmon	Mount Lemmon Survey	·	4.1 km	MPC · JPL
576176	2012 HV_{11}	—	March 15, 2012	Mount Lemmon	Mount Lemmon Survey	MAR	1.1 km	MPC · JPL
576177	2012 HE_{14}	—	November 1, 2005	Mount Lemmon	Mount Lemmon Survey	WIT	1.2 km	MPC · JPL
576178	2012 HY_{15}	—	April 15, 2012	Haleakala	Pan-STARRS 1	·	1.1 km	MPC · JPL
576179	2012 HV_{16}	—	April 15, 2012	Haleakala	Pan-STARRS 1	JUN	950 m	MPC · JPL
576180	2012 HR_{18}	—	April 21, 2012	Haleakala	Pan-STARRS 1	·	1.0 km	MPC · JPL
576181	2012 HM_{19}	—	April 22, 2012	Mount Lemmon	Mount Lemmon Survey	·	1.1 km	MPC · JPL
576182	2012 HJ_{20}	—	March 22, 2012	Catalina	CSS	BAR	1.1 km	MPC · JPL
576183	2012 HA_{25}	—	March 28, 2012	Mount Lemmon	Mount Lemmon Survey	H	490 m	MPC · JPL
576184	2012 HY_{25}	—	March 14, 2012	Haleakala	Pan-STARRS 1	H	310 m	MPC · JPL
576185	2012 HZ_{36}	—	April 27, 2012	Haleakala	Pan-STARRS 1	·	1.4 km	MPC · JPL
576186 Lefebvre	2012 HQ_{38}	Lefebvre	January 20, 2007	Mauna Kea	D. D. Balam, K. M. Perrett	EUN	1.0 km	MPC · JPL
576187	2012 HD_{39}	—	January 27, 2003	Haleakala	NEAT	·	1.9 km	MPC · JPL
576188	2012 HV_{42}	—	April 18, 2012	Kitt Peak	Spacewatch	·	1.6 km	MPC · JPL
576189	2012 HB_{43}	—	December 1, 2005	Kitt Peak	Wasserman, L. H., Millis, R. L.	·	900 m	MPC · JPL
576190	2012 HL_{46}	—	April 1, 2012	Haleakala	Pan-STARRS 1	·	1.2 km	MPC · JPL
576191	2012 HP_{49}	—	October 23, 2001	Palomar	NEAT	·	1.8 km	MPC · JPL
576192	2012 HQ_{51}	—	April 24, 2012	Mount Lemmon	Mount Lemmon Survey	·	1.3 km	MPC · JPL
576193	2012 HG_{54}	—	March 16, 2012	Kitt Peak	Spacewatch	·	1.0 km	MPC · JPL
576194	2012 HP_{54}	—	February 10, 2008	Mount Lemmon	Mount Lemmon Survey	·	1.1 km	MPC · JPL
576195	2012 HC_{59}	—	April 4, 2003	Kitt Peak	Spacewatch	·	1.8 km	MPC · JPL
576196	2012 HL_{61}	—	April 19, 2012	Mount Lemmon	Mount Lemmon Survey	JUN	880 m	MPC · JPL
576197	2012 HO_{61}	—	April 19, 2012	Haleakala	Pan-STARRS 1	BAR	820 m	MPC · JPL
576198	2012 HO_{62}	—	March 17, 2012	Mount Lemmon	Mount Lemmon Survey	·	1.1 km	MPC · JPL
576199	2012 HL_{64}	—	September 18, 2001	Anderson Mesa	LONEOS	·	2.2 km	MPC · JPL
576200	2012 HR_{64}	—	March 29, 2012	Kitt Peak	Spacewatch	·	1.0 km	MPC · JPL

== 576201–576300 ==
back to top

Designation			Discovery			Properties		Ref
Permanent	Provisional	Named after	Date	Site	Discoverer(s)	Category	Diam.	Ref
576201	2012 HZ_{65}	—	March 29, 2012	Haleakala	Pan-STARRS 1	·	1.6 km	MPC · JPL
576202	2012 HX_{68}	—	January 18, 2007	Palomar	NEAT	(194)	2.0 km	MPC · JPL
576203	2012 HC_{70}	—	April 22, 2012	Kitt Peak	Spacewatch	·	1.4 km	MPC · JPL
576204	2012 HJ_{76}	—	March 16, 2012	Kitt Peak	Spacewatch	·	1.1 km	MPC · JPL
576205	2012 HD_{78}	—	April 20, 2012	Mount Lemmon	Mount Lemmon Survey	·	1.2 km	MPC · JPL
576206	2012 HV_{78}	—	April 30, 2012	Mount Lemmon	Mount Lemmon Survey	·	2.0 km	MPC · JPL
576207	2012 HS_{79}	—	April 30, 2012	Mount Lemmon	Mount Lemmon Survey	·	1.0 km	MPC · JPL
576208	2012 HZ_{79}	—	October 2, 2005	Mount Lemmon	Mount Lemmon Survey	·	1.2 km	MPC · JPL
576209	2012 HR_{81}	—	April 30, 2012	Mount Lemmon	Mount Lemmon Survey	·	1.3 km	MPC · JPL
576210	2012 HC_{82}	—	March 4, 2012	Kitt Peak	Spacewatch	·	1.2 km	MPC · JPL
576211	2012 HF_{82}	—	April 1, 2003	Palomar	NEAT	·	1.7 km	MPC · JPL
576212	2012 HL_{85}	—	April 27, 2012	Haleakala	Pan-STARRS 1	cubewano (hot)	226 km	MPC · JPL
576213	2012 HX_{86}	—	April 24, 2012	Haleakala	Pan-STARRS 1	EUN	1.2 km	MPC · JPL
576214	2012 HD_{88}	—	April 27, 2012	Haleakala	Pan-STARRS 1	·	1.1 km	MPC · JPL
576215	2012 HS_{89}	—	February 13, 2015	Haleakala	Pan-STARRS 1	V	520 m	MPC · JPL
576216	2012 HK_{90}	—	April 29, 2012	Mount Lemmon	Mount Lemmon Survey	·	1.4 km	MPC · JPL
576217	2012 HK_{99}	—	April 30, 2012	Kitt Peak	Spacewatch	·	1.0 km	MPC · JPL
576218	2012 HH_{100}	—	April 20, 2012	Kitt Peak	Spacewatch	·	800 m	MPC · JPL
576219	2012 HF_{102}	—	April 16, 2012	Haleakala	Pan-STARRS 1	·	910 m	MPC · JPL
576220	2012 HV_{105}	—	April 27, 2012	Kitt Peak	Spacewatch	·	1.3 km	MPC · JPL
576221	2012 JA_{1}	—	March 29, 2012	Kitt Peak	Spacewatch	RAF	650 m	MPC · JPL
576222	2012 JF_{5}	—	May 14, 2012	Haleakala	Pan-STARRS 1	H	250 m	MPC · JPL
576223	2012 JJ_{5}	—	May 14, 2012	Haleakala	Pan-STARRS 1	H	410 m	MPC · JPL
576224	2012 JX_{6}	—	April 21, 2012	Kitt Peak	Spacewatch	·	1.2 km	MPC · JPL
576225	2012 JS_{10}	—	January 31, 2012	Haleakala	Pan-STARRS 1	JUN	1.0 km	MPC · JPL
576226	2012 JT_{10}	—	May 15, 2008	Mount Lemmon	Mount Lemmon Survey	·	1.7 km	MPC · JPL
576227	2012 JF_{13}	—	February 21, 2003	Palomar	NEAT	·	1.9 km	MPC · JPL
576228	2012 JX_{16}	—	March 20, 2007	Mount Lemmon	Mount Lemmon Survey	HNS	1.1 km	MPC · JPL
576229	2012 JZ_{20}	—	April 20, 2012	Mount Lemmon	Mount Lemmon Survey	·	1.3 km	MPC · JPL
576230	2012 JN_{22}	—	July 27, 2008	Charleston	R. Holmes	·	1.8 km	MPC · JPL
576231	2012 JR_{23}	—	April 25, 2012	Mount Lemmon	Mount Lemmon Survey	·	1.3 km	MPC · JPL
576232	2012 JV_{30}	—	October 12, 2009	Mount Lemmon	Mount Lemmon Survey	·	1.9 km	MPC · JPL
576233	2012 JG_{31}	—	February 21, 2007	Mount Lemmon	Mount Lemmon Survey	·	2.0 km	MPC · JPL
576234	2012 JW_{31}	—	May 15, 2012	Haleakala	Pan-STARRS 1	MIS	1.9 km	MPC · JPL
576235	2012 JC_{36}	—	May 15, 2012	Haleakala	Pan-STARRS 1	·	1.5 km	MPC · JPL
576236	2012 JA_{37}	—	November 21, 2005	Kitt Peak	Spacewatch	·	1.6 km	MPC · JPL
576237	2012 JL_{37}	—	March 26, 1995	Kitt Peak	Spacewatch	·	590 m	MPC · JPL
576238	2012 JM_{39}	—	May 12, 2012	Mount Lemmon	Mount Lemmon Survey	·	1.5 km	MPC · JPL
576239	2012 JN_{40}	—	June 13, 2008	Kitt Peak	Spacewatch	·	1.7 km	MPC · JPL
576240	2012 JO_{40}	—	May 12, 2012	Mount Lemmon	Mount Lemmon Survey	·	1.2 km	MPC · JPL
576241	2012 JS_{40}	—	May 12, 2012	Haleakala	Pan-STARRS 1	·	1.7 km	MPC · JPL
576242	2012 JN_{43}	—	November 3, 2005	Kitt Peak	Spacewatch	HNS	990 m	MPC · JPL
576243	2012 JV_{43}	—	May 15, 2012	Haleakala	Pan-STARRS 1	EUN	1.2 km	MPC · JPL
576244	2012 JH_{44}	—	January 31, 2012	Haleakala	Pan-STARRS 1	·	1.2 km	MPC · JPL
576245	2012 JY_{44}	—	May 1, 2012	Mount Lemmon	Mount Lemmon Survey	HNS	1.0 km	MPC · JPL
576246	2012 JD_{45}	—	August 28, 2005	Kitt Peak	Spacewatch	·	960 m	MPC · JPL
576247	2012 JR_{47}	—	May 15, 2012	Kitt Peak	Spacewatch	·	1.6 km	MPC · JPL
576248	2012 JS_{47}	—	May 15, 2012	Haleakala	Pan-STARRS 1	·	1.0 km	MPC · JPL
576249	2012 JE_{50}	—	May 12, 2012	Mount Lemmon	Mount Lemmon Survey	·	840 m	MPC · JPL
576250	2012 JS_{52}	—	November 8, 2010	Mount Lemmon	Mount Lemmon Survey	PHO	820 m	MPC · JPL
576251	2012 JV_{55}	—	May 12, 2012	Mount Lemmon	Mount Lemmon Survey	·	1.5 km	MPC · JPL
576252	2012 JV_{57}	—	May 12, 2012	Mount Lemmon	Mount Lemmon Survey	·	1.5 km	MPC · JPL
576253	2012 JF_{58}	—	April 14, 1999	Kitt Peak	Spacewatch	MIS	2.1 km	MPC · JPL
576254	2012 JK_{61}	—	May 14, 2012	Mount Lemmon	Mount Lemmon Survey	·	1.5 km	MPC · JPL
576255	2012 JA_{63}	—	April 24, 2012	Mount Lemmon	Mount Lemmon Survey	PHO	760 m	MPC · JPL
576256	2012 JH_{67}	—	May 21, 2015	Cerro Tololo-DECam	DECam	twotino	296 km	MPC · JPL
576257	2012 JD_{68}	—	May 14, 2012	Haleakala	Pan-STARRS 1	plutino	113 km	MPC · JPL
576258	2012 JL_{68}	—	May 12, 2012	Haleakala	Pan-STARRS 1	·	1.3 km	MPC · JPL
576259	2012 JU_{68}	—	May 15, 2012	Kitt Peak	Spacewatch	·	1.3 km	MPC · JPL
576260	2012 JB_{71}	—	May 15, 2012	Mount Lemmon	Mount Lemmon Survey	·	2.1 km	MPC · JPL
576261	2012 KM_{1}	—	April 25, 2012	Kitt Peak	Spacewatch	H	440 m	MPC · JPL
576262	2012 KY_{2}	—	August 21, 2004	Siding Spring	SSS	·	2.1 km	MPC · JPL
576263	2012 KW_{3}	—	May 17, 2012	Mount Lemmon	Mount Lemmon Survey	ADE	1.4 km	MPC · JPL
576264	2012 KG_{5}	—	April 21, 2012	Mount Lemmon	Mount Lemmon Survey	·	1.7 km	MPC · JPL
576265	2012 KY_{8}	—	November 6, 2005	Kitt Peak	Spacewatch	·	1.3 km	MPC · JPL
576266	2012 KC_{10}	—	April 21, 2012	Mount Lemmon	Mount Lemmon Survey	·	1.4 km	MPC · JPL
576267	2012 KZ_{13}	—	May 16, 2012	Mount Lemmon	Mount Lemmon Survey	MAR	1.1 km	MPC · JPL
576268	2012 KC_{19}	—	February 5, 2009	Mount Lemmon	Mount Lemmon Survey	H	510 m	MPC · JPL
576269	2012 KS_{22}	—	April 27, 2012	Haleakala	Pan-STARRS 1	(5)	1.1 km	MPC · JPL
576270	2012 KH_{30}	—	April 28, 2012	Mount Lemmon	Mount Lemmon Survey	·	1.0 km	MPC · JPL
576271	2012 KX_{31}	—	October 27, 2005	Kitt Peak	Spacewatch	·	770 m	MPC · JPL
576272	2012 KZ_{31}	—	May 27, 2008	Mount Lemmon	Mount Lemmon Survey	·	910 m	MPC · JPL
576273	2012 KN_{33}	—	November 8, 2009	Mount Lemmon	Mount Lemmon Survey	·	1.3 km	MPC · JPL
576274	2012 KZ_{35}	—	June 3, 2008	Mount Lemmon	Mount Lemmon Survey	·	1.1 km	MPC · JPL
576275	2012 KL_{43}	—	May 19, 2012	Mount Lemmon	Mount Lemmon Survey	·	1.3 km	MPC · JPL
576276	2012 KU_{43}	—	October 18, 2009	Mount Lemmon	Mount Lemmon Survey	·	1.4 km	MPC · JPL
576277	2012 KB_{44}	—	February 25, 2007	Mount Lemmon	Mount Lemmon Survey	·	1.2 km	MPC · JPL
576278	2012 KA_{46}	—	May 31, 2012	Mount Lemmon	Mount Lemmon Survey	ADE	1.6 km	MPC · JPL
576279	2012 KD_{46}	—	May 19, 2012	Piszkéstető	K. Sárneczky	·	1.8 km	MPC · JPL
576280	2012 KH_{50}	—	May 19, 2012	Piszkéstető	K. Sárneczky	·	830 m	MPC · JPL
576281	2012 KZ_{50}	—	December 2, 2010	Kitt Peak	Spacewatch	ADE	2.0 km	MPC · JPL
576282	2012 KC_{51}	—	February 21, 2003	Kvistaberg	Uppsala-DLR Asteroid Survey	·	1.6 km	MPC · JPL
576283	2012 KR_{53}	—	May 21, 2012	Haleakala	Pan-STARRS 1	·	1.1 km	MPC · JPL
576284	2012 KX_{53}	—	May 21, 2012	Haleakala	Pan-STARRS 1	MAR	810 m	MPC · JPL
576285	2012 KB_{54}	—	January 21, 2015	Haleakala	Pan-STARRS 1	·	1.3 km	MPC · JPL
576286	2012 KJ_{54}	—	October 29, 2014	Haleakala	Pan-STARRS 1	·	1.2 km	MPC · JPL
576287	2012 KN_{54}	—	December 3, 2013	Haleakala	Pan-STARRS 1	H	440 m	MPC · JPL
576288	2012 KX_{54}	—	September 17, 2013	Mount Lemmon	Mount Lemmon Survey	H	390 m	MPC · JPL
576289	2012 KB_{57}	—	September 26, 2017	Haleakala	Pan-STARRS 1	·	1.2 km	MPC · JPL
576290	2012 LE_{3}	—	July 16, 2004	Cerro Tololo	Deep Ecliptic Survey	·	1.1 km	MPC · JPL
576291	2012 LT_{3}	—	October 10, 2008	Mount Lemmon	Mount Lemmon Survey	·	3.6 km	MPC · JPL
576292	2012 LW_{6}	—	March 31, 2003	Kitt Peak	Spacewatch	·	1.4 km	MPC · JPL
576293	2012 LB_{9}	—	November 15, 2009	Hibiscus	Teamo, N.	MAR	960 m	MPC · JPL
576294	2012 LE_{9}	—	May 19, 2012	Kitt Peak	Spacewatch	ADE	1.3 km	MPC · JPL
576295	2012 LQ_{11}	—	May 25, 2012	ESA OGS	ESA OGS	T_{j} (2.94) · 3:2	5.1 km	MPC · JPL
576296	2012 LJ_{13}	—	March 6, 2003	Palomar	NEAT	·	1.9 km	MPC · JPL
576297	2012 LN_{13}	—	May 16, 2012	Haleakala	Pan-STARRS 1	MAR	830 m	MPC · JPL
576298	2012 LP_{13}	—	April 27, 2012	Mount Lemmon	Mount Lemmon Survey	·	1.1 km	MPC · JPL
576299	2012 LR_{13}	—	April 24, 2012	Mount Lemmon	Mount Lemmon Survey	EUN	850 m	MPC · JPL
576300	2012 LT_{14}	—	May 22, 2012	Mount Lemmon	Mount Lemmon Survey	·	2.0 km	MPC · JPL

== 576301–576400 ==
back to top

Designation			Discovery			Properties		Ref
Permanent	Provisional	Named after	Date	Site	Discoverer(s)	Category	Diam.	Ref
576301	2012 LS_{18}	—	June 9, 2012	Mount Lemmon	Mount Lemmon Survey	·	1.0 km	MPC · JPL
576302	2012 LM_{25}	—	June 10, 2012	Haleakala	Pan-STARRS 1	·	1.7 km	MPC · JPL
576303	2012 LU_{25}	—	June 14, 2012	Mount Lemmon	Mount Lemmon Survey	·	1.6 km	MPC · JPL
576304	2012 LE_{26}	—	February 21, 2003	Palomar	NEAT	·	2.0 km	MPC · JPL
576305	2012 LJ_{26}	—	April 9, 2003	Kitt Peak	Spacewatch	·	1.4 km	MPC · JPL
576306	2012 LC_{27}	—	November 9, 2013	Nogales	M. Schwartz, P. R. Holvorcem	·	1.8 km	MPC · JPL
576307	2012 LK_{27}	—	October 13, 2013	Mount Lemmon	Mount Lemmon Survey	·	980 m	MPC · JPL
576308	2012 LE_{28}	—	June 14, 2012	Mount Lemmon	Mount Lemmon Survey	·	1.4 km	MPC · JPL
576309	2012 LG_{28}	—	June 30, 2005	Kitt Peak	Spacewatch	·	860 m	MPC · JPL
576310	2012 LF_{29}	—	January 21, 2015	Haleakala	Pan-STARRS 1	·	860 m	MPC · JPL
576311	2012 LL_{30}	—	May 30, 2016	Haleakala	Pan-STARRS 1	HNS	990 m	MPC · JPL
576312	2012 MF	—	June 16, 2012	Mount Lemmon	Mount Lemmon Survey	·	1.1 km	MPC · JPL
576313	2012 MR_{2}	—	June 17, 2012	Piszkéstető	K. Sárneczky	BAR	1.5 km	MPC · JPL
576314	2012 MA_{5}	—	May 21, 2012	Haleakala	Pan-STARRS 1	·	1.4 km	MPC · JPL
576315	2012 ME_{5}	—	September 6, 2004	Palomar	NEAT	·	2.3 km	MPC · JPL
576316	2012 MK_{5}	—	September 3, 2005	Palomar	NEAT	·	1.2 km	MPC · JPL
576317	2012 MO_{8}	—	June 16, 2012	Haleakala	Pan-STARRS 1	JUN	1.1 km	MPC · JPL
576318	2012 ME_{9}	—	May 21, 2012	Haleakala	Pan-STARRS 1	EUN	1.8 km	MPC · JPL
576319	2012 MG_{9}	—	June 16, 2012	Mount Lemmon	Mount Lemmon Survey	·	1.7 km	MPC · JPL
576320	2012 MM_{9}	—	December 2, 2005	Mount Lemmon	Mount Lemmon Survey	·	1.8 km	MPC · JPL
576321	2012 MV_{9}	—	May 28, 2012	Mount Lemmon	Mount Lemmon Survey	·	1.8 km	MPC · JPL
576322	2012 MU_{12}	—	October 29, 2008	Mount Lemmon	Mount Lemmon Survey	·	2.1 km	MPC · JPL
576323	2012 MH_{15}	—	June 19, 2012	ESA OGS	ESA OGS	·	1.7 km	MPC · JPL
576324	2012 MM_{17}	—	June 21, 2012	Mount Lemmon	Mount Lemmon Survey	·	850 m	MPC · JPL
576325	2012 OQ_{1}	—	May 28, 2012	Mount Lemmon	Mount Lemmon Survey	H	680 m	MPC · JPL
576326	2012 OG_{2}	—	April 25, 2007	Mount Lemmon	Mount Lemmon Survey	·	1.6 km	MPC · JPL
576327	2012 OH_{2}	—	February 4, 2006	Kitt Peak	Spacewatch	·	2.2 km	MPC · JPL
576328	2012 OW_{3}	—	August 14, 2001	Haleakala	NEAT	H	520 m	MPC · JPL
576329	2012 OZ_{4}	—	July 28, 2012	Haleakala	Pan-STARRS 1	·	1.6 km	MPC · JPL
576330	2012 PW	—	August 6, 2012	Haleakala	Pan-STARRS 1	APO	620 m	MPC · JPL
576331	2012 PS_{2}	—	August 8, 2012	Haleakala	Pan-STARRS 1	·	1.7 km	MPC · JPL
576332	2012 PG_{4}	—	August 8, 2012	Haleakala	Pan-STARRS 1	GAL	1.4 km	MPC · JPL
576333	2012 PE_{5}	—	August 8, 2012	Haleakala	Pan-STARRS 1	·	1.7 km	MPC · JPL
576334	2012 PH_{8}	—	August 8, 2012	Haleakala	Pan-STARRS 1	·	1.8 km	MPC · JPL
576335	2012 PQ_{8}	—	September 29, 2008	Mount Lemmon	Mount Lemmon Survey	(18466)	2.1 km	MPC · JPL
576336	2012 PC_{10}	—	September 29, 2003	Kitt Peak	Spacewatch	·	1.1 km	MPC · JPL
576337	2012 PC_{11}	—	September 25, 2008	Kitt Peak	Spacewatch	NEM	2.1 km	MPC · JPL
576338	2012 PJ_{11}	—	August 10, 2012	Kitt Peak	Spacewatch	·	1.7 km	MPC · JPL
576339	2012 PZ_{12}	—	September 19, 2003	Kitt Peak	Spacewatch	PAD	1.5 km	MPC · JPL
576340	2012 PM_{13}	—	October 21, 2003	Palomar	NEAT	·	2.7 km	MPC · JPL
576341	2012 PO_{13}	—	November 3, 2008	Catalina	CSS	·	1.8 km	MPC · JPL
576342	2012 PT_{13}	—	September 17, 2003	Kitt Peak	Spacewatch	MRX	840 m	MPC · JPL
576343	2012 PJ_{14}	—	September 21, 2003	Kitt Peak	Spacewatch	GEF	1.2 km	MPC · JPL
576344	2012 PZ_{14}	—	October 25, 2003	Kitt Peak	Spacewatch	AGN	1.1 km	MPC · JPL
576345	2012 PP_{19}	—	August 11, 2012	Tivoli	G. Lehmann, ~Knöfel, A.	·	1.2 km	MPC · JPL
576346	2012 PH_{21}	—	September 24, 2007	Kitt Peak	Spacewatch	·	2.1 km	MPC · JPL
576347	2012 PJ_{21}	—	August 13, 2012	Haleakala	Pan-STARRS 1	·	1.8 km	MPC · JPL
576348	2012 PK_{21}	—	October 27, 2003	Anderson Mesa	LONEOS	·	2.6 km	MPC · JPL
576349	2012 PR_{29}	—	August 28, 2003	Palomar	NEAT	·	1.5 km	MPC · JPL
576350	2012 PL_{34}	—	August 8, 2012	Haleakala	Pan-STARRS 1	·	1.7 km	MPC · JPL
576351	2012 PX_{34}	—	October 7, 2005	Mauna Kea	A. Boattini	·	1.8 km	MPC · JPL
576352	2012 PV_{38}	—	October 24, 2005	Mauna Kea	A. Boattini	·	1.6 km	MPC · JPL
576353	2012 PH_{39}	—	June 14, 2007	Kitt Peak	Spacewatch	·	2.0 km	MPC · JPL
576354	2012 PY_{41}	—	September 30, 2003	Kitt Peak	Spacewatch	·	1.8 km	MPC · JPL
576355	2012 PO_{42}	—	November 19, 2008	Kitt Peak	Spacewatch	·	2.1 km	MPC · JPL
576356	2012 PD_{45}	—	August 13, 2012	Haleakala	Pan-STARRS 1	GAL	1.4 km	MPC · JPL
576357	2012 PV_{45}	—	August 6, 2012	Haleakala	Pan-STARRS 1	centaur	70 km	MPC · JPL
576358	2012 PC_{46}	—	February 4, 2000	Kitt Peak	Spacewatch	3:2	5.8 km	MPC · JPL
576359	2012 PF_{46}	—	December 7, 2013	Haleakala	Pan-STARRS 1	·	1.8 km	MPC · JPL
576360	2012 PG_{46}	—	September 18, 2015	Mount Lemmon	Mount Lemmon Survey	H	420 m	MPC · JPL
576361	2012 PB_{47}	—	February 20, 2006	Kitt Peak	Spacewatch	·	1.6 km	MPC · JPL
576362	2012 PX_{48}	—	September 26, 2003	Palomar	NEAT	·	1.9 km	MPC · JPL
576363	2012 PF_{50}	—	November 14, 2013	Mount Lemmon	Mount Lemmon Survey	EOS	1.7 km	MPC · JPL
576364	2012 PQ_{51}	—	July 25, 2017	Haleakala	Pan-STARRS 1	·	1.6 km	MPC · JPL
576365	2012 PC_{53}	—	August 14, 2012	Haleakala	Pan-STARRS 1	L5	7.7 km	MPC · JPL
576366	2012 PT_{53}	—	August 14, 2012	Siding Spring	SSS	·	2.1 km	MPC · JPL
576367	2012 PV_{54}	—	August 13, 2012	Kitt Peak	Spacewatch	·	1.8 km	MPC · JPL
576368	2012 PL_{55}	—	August 13, 2012	Haleakala	Pan-STARRS 1	L5	9.4 km	MPC · JPL
576369	2012 PK_{56}	—	August 13, 2012	Haleakala	Pan-STARRS 1	·	1.5 km	MPC · JPL
576370	2012 PP_{56}	—	August 13, 2012	Haleakala	Pan-STARRS 1	AGN	1.1 km	MPC · JPL
576371	2012 QA_{1}	—	August 11, 2012	Mayhill-ISON	L. Elenin	·	1.7 km	MPC · JPL
576372	2012 QS_{1}	—	February 16, 2010	Kitt Peak	Spacewatch	·	1.7 km	MPC · JPL
576373 Wolfgangbusch	2012 QX_{2}	Wolfgangbusch	August 16, 2012	ESA OGS	ESA OGS	·	1.5 km	MPC · JPL
576374	2012 QY_{3}	—	August 13, 2012	Haleakala	Pan-STARRS 1	·	1.6 km	MPC · JPL
576375	2012 QL_{5}	—	November 2, 2008	Mount Lemmon	Mount Lemmon Survey	AEO	1.0 km	MPC · JPL
576376	2012 QA_{6}	—	September 17, 2003	Palomar	NEAT	·	2.2 km	MPC · JPL
576377	2012 QY_{6}	—	November 1, 2008	Mount Lemmon	Mount Lemmon Survey	KOR	1.4 km	MPC · JPL
576378	2012 QU_{9}	—	September 30, 2003	Kitt Peak	Spacewatch	·	1.4 km	MPC · JPL
576379	2012 QM_{10}	—	August 21, 2012	Haleakala	Pan-STARRS 1	L5	9.5 km	MPC · JPL
576380	2012 QA_{13}	—	September 3, 2003	Haleakala	NEAT	EUN	1.6 km	MPC · JPL
576381	2012 QM_{13}	—	August 17, 2012	Haleakala	Pan-STARRS 1	PAD	1.2 km	MPC · JPL
576382	2012 QD_{22}	—	February 2, 2005	Kitt Peak	Spacewatch	·	2.0 km	MPC · JPL
576383	2012 QG_{23}	—	February 13, 2002	Kitt Peak	Spacewatch	·	1.7 km	MPC · JPL
576384	2012 QE_{26}	—	May 2, 2006	Mount Lemmon	Mount Lemmon Survey	·	1.5 km	MPC · JPL
576385	2012 QW_{26}	—	October 4, 2002	Palomar	NEAT	·	1.6 km	MPC · JPL
576386	2012 QF_{28}	—	October 20, 2003	Kitt Peak	Spacewatch	·	1.7 km	MPC · JPL
576387	2012 QR_{31}	—	September 20, 2003	Kitt Peak	Spacewatch	·	1.7 km	MPC · JPL
576388	2012 QL_{33}	—	November 19, 2003	Kitt Peak	Spacewatch	·	2.3 km	MPC · JPL
576389	2012 QS_{36}	—	September 27, 2008	Mount Lemmon	Mount Lemmon Survey	·	1.5 km	MPC · JPL
576390	2012 QJ_{37}	—	November 9, 2007	Catalina	CSS	EOS	2.1 km	MPC · JPL
576391	2012 QO_{37}	—	December 19, 2009	Mount Lemmon	Mount Lemmon Survey	·	2.2 km	MPC · JPL
576392	2012 QS_{37}	—	November 19, 1998	Kitt Peak	Spacewatch	AGN	1.6 km	MPC · JPL
576393	2012 QT_{39}	—	August 24, 2003	Cerro Tololo	Deep Ecliptic Survey	·	1.3 km	MPC · JPL
576394	2012 QR_{44}	—	August 10, 2012	Kitt Peak	Spacewatch	·	1.7 km	MPC · JPL
576395	2012 QV_{45}	—	September 12, 2007	Mount Lemmon	Mount Lemmon Survey	THM	1.8 km	MPC · JPL
576396	2012 QM_{47}	—	September 13, 2007	Kitt Peak	Spacewatch	·	2.0 km	MPC · JPL
576397	2012 QS_{51}	—	July 23, 2003	Palomar	NEAT	·	1.5 km	MPC · JPL
576398	2012 QQ_{54}	—	August 25, 2012	Kitt Peak	Spacewatch	·	2.2 km	MPC · JPL
576399	2012 QW_{54}	—	November 27, 2013	Haleakala	Pan-STARRS 1	·	1.4 km	MPC · JPL
576400	2012 QX_{54}	—	August 25, 2012	Haleakala	Pan-STARRS 1	L5	8.8 km	MPC · JPL

== 576401–576500 ==
back to top

Designation			Discovery			Properties		Ref
Permanent	Provisional	Named after	Date	Site	Discoverer(s)	Category	Diam.	Ref
576401	2012 QE_{55}	—	January 3, 2014	Mount Lemmon	Mount Lemmon Survey	EUN	1.1 km	MPC · JPL
576402	2012 QS_{55}	—	August 26, 2012	Haleakala	Pan-STARRS 1	BRA	1.3 km	MPC · JPL
576403	2012 QW_{55}	—	December 7, 2013	Kitt Peak	Spacewatch	·	1.8 km	MPC · JPL
576404	2012 QK_{56}	—	August 26, 2012	Haleakala	Pan-STARRS 1	·	1.3 km	MPC · JPL
576405	2012 QY_{61}	—	February 17, 2015	Haleakala	Pan-STARRS 1	HOF	1.9 km	MPC · JPL
576406	2012 QZ_{66}	—	August 26, 2012	Haleakala	Pan-STARRS 1	·	1.7 km	MPC · JPL
576407	2012 QS_{67}	—	August 25, 2012	Mount Lemmon	Mount Lemmon Survey	·	1.3 km	MPC · JPL
576408	2012 RZ_{3}	—	September 8, 2012	Modra	Gajdoš, S., Világi, J.	·	1.9 km	MPC · JPL
576409	2012 RH_{4}	—	September 21, 2003	Palomar	NEAT	·	1.7 km	MPC · JPL
576410	2012 RV_{9}	—	August 29, 2003	Haleakala	NEAT	·	2.7 km	MPC · JPL
576411	2012 RT_{13}	—	September 14, 2012	Catalina	CSS	(13314)	1.8 km	MPC · JPL
576412	2012 RQ_{14}	—	September 15, 2012	Mount Lemmon	Mount Lemmon Survey	PHO	770 m	MPC · JPL
576413	2012 RC_{16}	—	January 25, 2009	Catalina	CSS	·	2.4 km	MPC · JPL
576414	2012 RB_{17}	—	October 21, 2003	Palomar	NEAT	DOR	2.4 km	MPC · JPL
576415	2012 RR_{23}	—	September 14, 2012	Kitt Peak	Spacewatch	·	1.8 km	MPC · JPL
576416	2012 RL_{24}	—	October 18, 2003	Kitt Peak	Spacewatch	·	2.4 km	MPC · JPL
576417	2012 RB_{25}	—	September 14, 2012	ESA OGS	ESA OGS	·	1.9 km	MPC · JPL
576418	2012 RN_{27}	—	August 23, 2007	Kitt Peak	Spacewatch	·	2.0 km	MPC · JPL
576419	2012 RE_{28}	—	September 21, 2003	Kitt Peak	Spacewatch	·	2.0 km	MPC · JPL
576420	2012 RH_{36}	—	September 6, 2012	Mount Lemmon	Mount Lemmon Survey	·	2.0 km	MPC · JPL
576421	2012 RV_{37}	—	April 29, 2011	Mount Lemmon	Mount Lemmon Survey	GEF	1.2 km	MPC · JPL
576422	2012 RJ_{38}	—	October 18, 2007	Kitt Peak	Spacewatch	THM	2.2 km	MPC · JPL
576423	2012 RK_{41}	—	August 29, 2003	Haleakala	NEAT	·	2.6 km	MPC · JPL
576424	2012 RR_{44}	—	September 15, 2012	Catalina	CSS	·	1.8 km	MPC · JPL
576425	2012 RY_{44}	—	September 15, 2012	Catalina	CSS	·	2.3 km	MPC · JPL
576426	2012 RD_{45}	—	November 21, 2003	Kitt Peak	Spacewatch	·	1.5 km	MPC · JPL
576427	2012 RJ_{47}	—	September 14, 2012	Mount Lemmon	Mount Lemmon Survey	·	2.8 km	MPC · JPL
576428	2012 SZ	—	September 16, 2012	Kitt Peak	Spacewatch	·	1.9 km	MPC · JPL
576429	2012 SB_{2}	—	August 22, 2003	Palomar	NEAT	·	2.3 km	MPC · JPL
576430	2012 SK_{2}	—	January 19, 2005	Kitt Peak	Spacewatch	L5	10 km	MPC · JPL
576431	2012 SQ_{2}	—	October 28, 2003	Bergisch Gladbach	W. Bickel	·	1.9 km	MPC · JPL
576432	2012 SH_{4}	—	October 25, 2005	Kitt Peak	Spacewatch	·	800 m	MPC · JPL
576433	2012 ST_{4}	—	November 29, 2003	Junk Bond	D. Healy	AGN	1.6 km	MPC · JPL
576434	2012 SF_{6}	—	September 17, 2012	Mount Lemmon	Mount Lemmon Survey	·	1.8 km	MPC · JPL
576435	2012 SF_{9}	—	September 18, 2012	Wildberg	R. Apitzsch	·	1.5 km	MPC · JPL
576436	2012 SM_{9}	—	January 18, 2010	Tzec Maun	D. Chestnov, A. Novichonok	·	2.8 km	MPC · JPL
576437	2012 SS_{10}	—	September 15, 2002	Haleakala	NEAT	·	3.3 km	MPC · JPL
576438	2012 SL_{11}	—	September 16, 2012	Catalina	CSS	·	2.1 km	MPC · JPL
576439	2012 SZ_{14}	—	September 17, 2012	Kitt Peak	Spacewatch	·	680 m	MPC · JPL
576440	2012 SR_{15}	—	November 26, 2003	Kitt Peak	Spacewatch	·	1.8 km	MPC · JPL
576441	2012 SB_{17}	—	August 14, 2002	Kitt Peak	Spacewatch	·	2.3 km	MPC · JPL
576442	2012 SN_{20}	—	October 31, 2008	Kitt Peak	Spacewatch	·	1.7 km	MPC · JPL
576443	2012 SZ_{24}	—	October 10, 2007	Mount Lemmon	Mount Lemmon Survey	·	2.2 km	MPC · JPL
576444	2012 SX_{26}	—	September 17, 2012	Mount Lemmon	Mount Lemmon Survey	AGN	990 m	MPC · JPL
576445	2012 SJ_{27}	—	January 19, 2005	Kitt Peak	Spacewatch	·	2.3 km	MPC · JPL
576446	2012 SM_{28}	—	March 13, 2005	Kitt Peak	Spacewatch	·	1.7 km	MPC · JPL
576447	2012 SK_{29}	—	September 20, 2012	Mayhill-ISON	L. Elenin	·	1.8 km	MPC · JPL
576448	2012 SF_{34}	—	October 18, 2003	Kitt Peak	Spacewatch	·	2.1 km	MPC · JPL
576449	2012 SK_{34}	—	September 18, 2012	Mount Lemmon	Mount Lemmon Survey	·	1.9 km	MPC · JPL
576450	2012 ST_{34}	—	April 9, 2006	Kitt Peak	Spacewatch	·	1.8 km	MPC · JPL
576451	2012 SM_{35}	—	August 26, 2012	Haleakala	Pan-STARRS 1	MRX	820 m	MPC · JPL
576452	2012 SU_{35}	—	September 18, 2012	Mount Lemmon	Mount Lemmon Survey	·	560 m	MPC · JPL
576453	2012 SB_{36}	—	September 18, 2012	Mount Lemmon	Mount Lemmon Survey	KOR	1.0 km	MPC · JPL
576454	2012 SC_{37}	—	August 26, 2012	Haleakala	Pan-STARRS 1	·	1.6 km	MPC · JPL
576455	2012 SO_{38}	—	March 1, 2009	Mount Lemmon	Mount Lemmon Survey	·	2.7 km	MPC · JPL
576456	2012 SC_{41}	—	May 1, 2006	Mauna Kea	P. A. Wiegert	·	1.3 km	MPC · JPL
576457	2012 SJ_{42}	—	September 18, 2012	Mount Lemmon	Mount Lemmon Survey	·	1.7 km	MPC · JPL
576458	2012 SD_{44}	—	November 24, 2008	Kitt Peak	Spacewatch	HOF	2.4 km	MPC · JPL
576459	2012 SE_{44}	—	July 28, 2011	Haleakala	Pan-STARRS 1	L5	8.4 km	MPC · JPL
576460	2012 SN_{46}	—	April 2, 2011	Kitt Peak	Spacewatch	·	1.7 km	MPC · JPL
576461	2012 SK_{47}	—	September 17, 2012	Mount Lemmon	Mount Lemmon Survey	·	1.9 km	MPC · JPL
576462	2012 SO_{49}	—	March 13, 2010	Kitt Peak	Spacewatch	KOR	1.2 km	MPC · JPL
576463	2012 SB_{53}	—	September 18, 2003	Kitt Peak	Spacewatch	·	1.6 km	MPC · JPL
576464	2012 SE_{54}	—	November 21, 2008	Kitt Peak	Spacewatch	HOF	2.4 km	MPC · JPL
576465 Craigwoodhams	2012 SZ_{56}	Craigwoodhams	September 24, 2012	Mayhill	Falla, N.	HOF	2.2 km	MPC · JPL
576466 Scherpenisse	2012 SM_{58}	Scherpenisse	September 21, 2012	Sierra Stars	Langbroek, M.	·	2.4 km	MPC · JPL
576467	2012 SD_{59}	—	August 13, 2012	Kitt Peak	Spacewatch	·	3.0 km	MPC · JPL
576468	2012 SY_{61}	—	September 19, 2012	Mount Lemmon	Mount Lemmon Survey	·	2.1 km	MPC · JPL
576469	2012 SH_{63}	—	October 23, 2003	Kitt Peak	Spacewatch	·	1.7 km	MPC · JPL
576470	2012 SH_{64}	—	January 27, 2007	Mount Lemmon	Mount Lemmon Survey	·	640 m	MPC · JPL
576471	2012 SJ_{64}	—	November 19, 2003	Palomar	NEAT	·	1.7 km	MPC · JPL
576472	2012 SA_{65}	—	September 21, 2003	Palomar	NEAT	·	3.0 km	MPC · JPL
576473	2012 SN_{65}	—	January 11, 2010	Kitt Peak	Spacewatch	HOF	2.6 km	MPC · JPL
576474	2012 ST_{69}	—	October 17, 2003	Kitt Peak	Spacewatch	MRX	1.0 km	MPC · JPL
576475	2012 SC_{70}	—	September 17, 2012	Kitt Peak	Spacewatch	GEF	1.1 km	MPC · JPL
576476	2012 SD_{70}	—	October 10, 2008	Kitt Peak	Spacewatch	·	860 m	MPC · JPL
576477	2012 SO_{70}	—	September 21, 2012	Kitt Peak	Spacewatch	AGN	940 m	MPC · JPL
576478	2012 SR_{71}	—	September 27, 2012	Haleakala	Pan-STARRS 1	·	2.7 km	MPC · JPL
576479	2012 SM_{72}	—	November 28, 2014	Haleakala	Pan-STARRS 1	L5	9.2 km	MPC · JPL
576480	2012 SS_{72}	—	March 22, 2015	Haleakala	Pan-STARRS 1	·	1.8 km	MPC · JPL
576481	2012 SX_{72}	—	September 16, 2012	Kitt Peak	Spacewatch	·	3.1 km	MPC · JPL
576482	2012 SC_{73}	—	September 19, 2012	Mount Lemmon	Mount Lemmon Survey	·	1.4 km	MPC · JPL
576483	2012 SM_{73}	—	January 3, 2014	Mount Lemmon	Mount Lemmon Survey	·	1.2 km	MPC · JPL
576484	2012 SN_{79}	—	September 17, 2012	Kitt Peak	Spacewatch	THM	1.9 km	MPC · JPL
576485	2012 SV_{79}	—	September 25, 2012	Mount Lemmon	Mount Lemmon Survey	·	1.8 km	MPC · JPL
576486	2012 SR_{85}	—	September 21, 2012	Mount Lemmon	Mount Lemmon Survey	·	1.1 km	MPC · JPL
576487	2012 SU_{85}	—	September 25, 2012	Mount Lemmon	Mount Lemmon Survey	·	1.6 km	MPC · JPL
576488	2012 SV_{85}	—	September 17, 2012	Mount Lemmon	Mount Lemmon Survey	MRX	880 m	MPC · JPL
576489	2012 SW_{86}	—	September 18, 2012	Mount Lemmon	Mount Lemmon Survey	·	1.8 km	MPC · JPL
576490	2012 ST_{87}	—	August 26, 2012	Kitt Peak	Spacewatch	·	1.9 km	MPC · JPL
576491	2012 SR_{88}	—	September 22, 2012	Kitt Peak	Spacewatch	KOR	1.0 km	MPC · JPL
576492	2012 SU_{88}	—	September 24, 2012	Mount Lemmon	Mount Lemmon Survey	EOS	1.5 km	MPC · JPL
576493	2012 SA_{89}	—	September 16, 2012	Catalina	CSS	·	1.0 km	MPC · JPL
576494	2012 SH_{92}	—	September 25, 2012	Mount Lemmon	Mount Lemmon Survey	·	560 m	MPC · JPL
576495	2012 TJ	—	April 28, 2008	Mount Lemmon	Mount Lemmon Survey	L5	6.8 km	MPC · JPL
576496	2012 TS_{1}	—	September 23, 2012	Mount Lemmon	Mount Lemmon Survey	AST	1.4 km	MPC · JPL
576497	2012 TX_{4}	—	October 5, 2012	Haleakala	Pan-STARRS 1	L5	7.7 km	MPC · JPL
576498	2012 TY_{7}	—	September 20, 2003	Kitt Peak	Spacewatch	·	1.2 km	MPC · JPL
576499	2012 TR_{13}	—	October 10, 1999	Socorro	LINEAR	·	470 m	MPC · JPL
576500	2012 TQ_{14}	—	July 13, 2009	Cerro Burek	Burek, Cerro	L5	10 km	MPC · JPL

== 576501–576600 ==
back to top

Designation			Discovery			Properties		Ref
Permanent	Provisional	Named after	Date	Site	Discoverer(s)	Category	Diam.	Ref
576501	2012 TG_{17}	—	October 5, 2012	Mount Lemmon	Mount Lemmon Survey	KOR	1.0 km	MPC · JPL
576502	2012 TJ_{17}	—	September 22, 2012	Mount Lemmon	T. Vorobjov, Kostin, A.	·	1.8 km	MPC · JPL
576503	2012 TV_{17}	—	September 15, 2012	Nogales	M. Schwartz, P. R. Holvorcem	·	2.4 km	MPC · JPL
576504	2012 TN_{26}	—	October 20, 2001	Palomar	NEAT	ARM	3.7 km	MPC · JPL
576505	2012 TO_{26}	—	October 6, 2012	Mount Lemmon	Mount Lemmon Survey	·	1.8 km	MPC · JPL
576506	2012 TC_{27}	—	September 30, 2005	Mount Lemmon	Mount Lemmon Survey	·	490 m	MPC · JPL
576507	2012 TJ_{28}	—	September 19, 2001	Socorro	LINEAR	·	900 m	MPC · JPL
576508	2012 TJ_{29}	—	October 21, 2001	Socorro	LINEAR	LIX	2.9 km	MPC · JPL
576509	2012 TT_{31}	—	September 14, 2012	Mount Lemmon	Mount Lemmon Survey	·	2.1 km	MPC · JPL
576510	2012 TN_{34}	—	September 21, 2012	Kitt Peak	Spacewatch	·	560 m	MPC · JPL
576511	2012 TO_{34}	—	September 14, 1999	Catalina	CSS	·	610 m	MPC · JPL
576512	2012 TA_{38}	—	September 27, 2003	Kitt Peak	Spacewatch	GEF	950 m	MPC · JPL
576513	2012 TJ_{43}	—	October 8, 2012	Mount Lemmon	Mount Lemmon Survey	·	1.9 km	MPC · JPL
576514	2012 TD_{46}	—	October 8, 2012	Mount Lemmon	Mount Lemmon Survey	·	1.9 km	MPC · JPL
576515	2012 TA_{48}	—	February 16, 2010	Kitt Peak	Spacewatch	AGN	950 m	MPC · JPL
576516	2012 TV_{49}	—	September 15, 2012	ESA OGS	ESA OGS	KOR	1.2 km	MPC · JPL
576517	2012 TR_{50}	—	September 14, 2007	Mount Lemmon	Mount Lemmon Survey	KOR	910 m	MPC · JPL
576518	2012 TN_{51}	—	October 8, 2012	Haleakala	Pan-STARRS 1	HOF	2.3 km	MPC · JPL
576519	2012 TJ_{52}	—	September 17, 2012	Mount Lemmon	Mount Lemmon Survey	L5	6.9 km	MPC · JPL
576520	2012 TW_{54}	—	March 14, 2010	Kitt Peak	Spacewatch	·	2.0 km	MPC · JPL
576521	2012 TL_{57}	—	September 10, 2007	Mount Lemmon	Mount Lemmon Survey	·	1.9 km	MPC · JPL
576522	2012 TS_{60}	—	December 21, 2008	Mount Lemmon	Mount Lemmon Survey	·	1.7 km	MPC · JPL
576523	2012 TS_{63}	—	September 30, 2003	Kitt Peak	Spacewatch	·	1.7 km	MPC · JPL
576524	2012 TO_{67}	—	September 6, 2008	Mount Lemmon	Mount Lemmon Survey	·	820 m	MPC · JPL
576525	2012 TQ_{67}	—	October 16, 2001	Kitt Peak	Spacewatch	T_{j} (2.94) · unusual	10 km	MPC · JPL
576526	2012 TA_{72}	—	September 16, 2012	Mount Lemmon	Mount Lemmon Survey	·	1.5 km	MPC · JPL
576527	2012 TP_{72}	—	October 9, 2012	Mount Lemmon	Mount Lemmon Survey	L5	6.8 km	MPC · JPL
576528	2012 TZ_{80}	—	September 9, 2007	Kitt Peak	Spacewatch	KOR	1.7 km	MPC · JPL
576529	2012 TG_{81}	—	October 5, 2012	Haleakala	Pan-STARRS 1	AGN	1.1 km	MPC · JPL
576530	2012 TJ_{83}	—	March 20, 2010	Kitt Peak	Spacewatch	·	1.6 km	MPC · JPL
576531	2012 TJ_{84}	—	October 6, 2012	Mount Lemmon	Mount Lemmon Survey	EOS	1.4 km	MPC · JPL
576532	2012 TC_{85}	—	October 6, 2012	Mount Lemmon	Mount Lemmon Survey	AGN	1.0 km	MPC · JPL
576533	2012 TT_{86}	—	September 15, 2012	Mount Lemmon	Mount Lemmon Survey	·	2.3 km	MPC · JPL
576534	2012 TM_{88}	—	September 23, 2012	Mount Lemmon	Mount Lemmon Survey	HOF	1.9 km	MPC · JPL
576535	2012 TZ_{88}	—	December 31, 2008	Mount Lemmon	Mount Lemmon Survey	·	1.5 km	MPC · JPL
576536	2012 TF_{89}	—	September 6, 2012	Mount Lemmon	Mount Lemmon Survey	EUN	1.2 km	MPC · JPL
576537	2012 TS_{91}	—	October 20, 2003	Kitt Peak	Spacewatch	AGN	1.3 km	MPC · JPL
576538	2012 TB_{93}	—	October 7, 2012	Haleakala	Pan-STARRS 1	HOF	2.3 km	MPC · JPL
576539	2012 TW_{93}	—	October 7, 2012	Haleakala	Pan-STARRS 1	HNS	990 m	MPC · JPL
576540	2012 TP_{95}	—	September 3, 2007	Catalina	CSS	·	2.0 km	MPC · JPL
576541	2012 TU_{98}	—	March 11, 2005	Kitt Peak	Spacewatch	·	2.0 km	MPC · JPL
576542	2012 TD_{101}	—	December 5, 2003	Catalina	CSS	GAL	2.0 km	MPC · JPL
576543	2012 TN_{104}	—	August 28, 2003	Haleakala	NEAT	·	1.9 km	MPC · JPL
576544	2012 TC_{105}	—	October 9, 2012	Mount Lemmon	Mount Lemmon Survey	·	2.4 km	MPC · JPL
576545	2012 TV_{105}	—	November 16, 2003	Kitt Peak	Spacewatch	·	1.9 km	MPC · JPL
576546	2012 TF_{106}	—	October 19, 2003	Kitt Peak	Spacewatch	AGN	1.1 km	MPC · JPL
576547	2012 TY_{107}	—	September 16, 2012	Mount Lemmon	Mount Lemmon Survey	MAR	660 m	MPC · JPL
576548	2012 TJ_{108}	—	September 16, 2012	Mount Lemmon	Mount Lemmon Survey	·	950 m	MPC · JPL
576549	2012 TC_{109}	—	September 3, 2007	Pla D'Arguines	R. Ferrando, Ferrando, M.	·	2.0 km	MPC · JPL
576550	2012 TP_{109}	—	October 10, 2012	Mount Lemmon	Mount Lemmon Survey	EOS	1.5 km	MPC · JPL
576551	2012 TU_{109}	—	November 3, 2007	Kitt Peak	Spacewatch	·	2.5 km	MPC · JPL
576552	2012 TL_{112}	—	October 10, 2012	Mount Lemmon	Mount Lemmon Survey	·	1.2 km	MPC · JPL
576553	2012 TF_{115}	—	January 18, 2009	Mount Lemmon	Mount Lemmon Survey	·	2.1 km	MPC · JPL
576554	2012 TS_{116}	—	October 10, 2012	Mount Lemmon	Mount Lemmon Survey	GEF	1.3 km	MPC · JPL
576555	2012 TC_{121}	—	September 16, 2012	Kitt Peak	Spacewatch	·	1.7 km	MPC · JPL
576556	2012 TG_{121}	—	October 10, 2012	Mount Lemmon	Mount Lemmon Survey	·	2.9 km	MPC · JPL
576557	2012 TM_{122}	—	October 6, 2012	Mount Lemmon	Mount Lemmon Survey	·	1.9 km	MPC · JPL
576558	2012 TR_{124}	—	October 9, 1996	Kitt Peak	Spacewatch	H	370 m	MPC · JPL
576559	2012 TW_{124}	—	February 13, 2010	Kitt Peak	Spacewatch	·	2.4 km	MPC · JPL
576560	2012 TP_{126}	—	October 19, 2003	Kitt Peak	Spacewatch	AST	1.5 km	MPC · JPL
576561	2012 TC_{127}	—	October 5, 2012	Haleakala	Pan-STARRS 1	AGN	1.1 km	MPC · JPL
576562	2012 TL_{127}	—	October 6, 2012	Haleakala	Pan-STARRS 1	·	1.7 km	MPC · JPL
576563	2012 TN_{130}	—	February 22, 2002	Palomar	NEAT	·	2.1 km	MPC · JPL
576564	2012 TL_{131}	—	August 30, 2002	Palomar	NEAT	·	530 m	MPC · JPL
576565	2012 TC_{134}	—	September 17, 2012	Mount Lemmon	Mount Lemmon Survey	EOS	1.5 km	MPC · JPL
576566	2012 TN_{135}	—	July 14, 2002	Palomar	NEAT	·	1.8 km	MPC · JPL
576567	2012 TD_{136}	—	September 11, 2012	Siding Spring	SSS	·	2.3 km	MPC · JPL
576568	2012 TS_{137}	—	November 26, 2003	Kitt Peak	Spacewatch	·	2.1 km	MPC · JPL
576569	2012 TX_{140}	—	October 5, 2012	Mount Lemmon	Mount Lemmon Survey	·	1.8 km	MPC · JPL
576570	2012 TQ_{141}	—	October 5, 2012	Haleakala	Pan-STARRS 1	HOF	2.2 km	MPC · JPL
576571	2012 TH_{147}	—	April 6, 2011	Kitt Peak	Spacewatch	V	550 m	MPC · JPL
576572	2012 TR_{147}	—	October 24, 2003	Kitt Peak	Spacewatch	·	1.8 km	MPC · JPL
576573	2012 TU_{147}	—	October 3, 2003	Kitt Peak	Spacewatch	CLO	1.8 km	MPC · JPL
576574	2012 TW_{147}	—	June 24, 2001	Kitt Peak	Spacewatch	EOS	2.0 km	MPC · JPL
576575	2012 TO_{148}	—	November 20, 2007	Kitt Peak	Spacewatch	·	2.7 km	MPC · JPL
576576	2012 TF_{154}	—	October 8, 2012	Haleakala	Pan-STARRS 1	AGN	1.0 km	MPC · JPL
576577	2012 TA_{157}	—	October 8, 2012	Haleakala	Pan-STARRS 1	KOR	1.2 km	MPC · JPL
576578	2012 TV_{159}	—	October 8, 2012	Mount Lemmon	Mount Lemmon Survey	·	1.8 km	MPC · JPL
576579	2012 TH_{160}	—	October 8, 2012	Haleakala	Pan-STARRS 1	·	1.5 km	MPC · JPL
576580	2012 TP_{164}	—	October 8, 2012	Haleakala	Pan-STARRS 1	·	2.2 km	MPC · JPL
576581	2012 TR_{167}	—	April 13, 2011	Mount Lemmon	Mount Lemmon Survey	·	2.1 km	MPC · JPL
576582	2012 TZ_{170}	—	November 16, 2003	Kitt Peak	Spacewatch	MRX	910 m	MPC · JPL
576583	2012 TM_{177}	—	October 9, 2012	Haleakala	Pan-STARRS 1	BRA	1.4 km	MPC · JPL
576584	2012 TZ_{180}	—	October 8, 2012	Mount Lemmon	Mount Lemmon Survey	·	1.6 km	MPC · JPL
576585	2012 TK_{192}	—	September 22, 2003	Palomar	NEAT	·	1.9 km	MPC · JPL
576586	2012 TA_{195}	—	April 2, 2005	Mount Lemmon	Mount Lemmon Survey	·	1.9 km	MPC · JPL
576587	2012 TY_{197}	—	October 10, 2012	Bergisch Gladbach	W. Bickel	·	2.3 km	MPC · JPL
576588	2012 TD_{199}	—	October 11, 2012	Kitt Peak	Spacewatch	·	670 m	MPC · JPL
576589	2012 TJ_{202}	—	March 4, 2005	Mount Lemmon	Mount Lemmon Survey	·	1.6 km	MPC · JPL
576590	2012 TB_{203}	—	October 11, 2012	Mount Lemmon	Mount Lemmon Survey	·	2.1 km	MPC · JPL
576591	2012 TJ_{206}	—	September 26, 2008	Kitt Peak	Spacewatch	(5)	960 m	MPC · JPL
576592	2012 TF_{208}	—	September 19, 2012	Mount Lemmon	Mount Lemmon Survey	URS	3.0 km	MPC · JPL
576593	2012 TY_{208}	—	October 11, 2012	Mount Lemmon	Mount Lemmon Survey	L5	7.0 km	MPC · JPL
576594	2012 TF_{209}	—	October 11, 2012	Mount Lemmon	Mount Lemmon Survey	·	1.6 km	MPC · JPL
576595	2012 TN_{213}	—	October 11, 2012	Haleakala	Pan-STARRS 1	·	840 m	MPC · JPL
576596	2012 TX_{214}	—	October 11, 2012	Mount Lemmon	Mount Lemmon Survey	·	1.6 km	MPC · JPL
576597	2012 TY_{216}	—	October 13, 2012	Kitt Peak	Spacewatch	·	500 m	MPC · JPL
576598	2012 TR_{218}	—	September 15, 2012	Kitt Peak	Spacewatch	L5	8.8 km	MPC · JPL
576599	2012 TS_{218}	—	October 14, 2012	Kitt Peak	Spacewatch	(16286)	1.4 km	MPC · JPL
576600	2012 TY_{218}	—	October 6, 2012	Haleakala	Pan-STARRS 1	DOR	2.2 km	MPC · JPL

== 576601–576700 ==
back to top

Designation			Discovery			Properties		Ref
Permanent	Provisional	Named after	Date	Site	Discoverer(s)	Category	Diam.	Ref
576601	2012 TO_{219}	—	December 4, 2007	Kitt Peak	Spacewatch	THM	1.8 km	MPC · JPL
576602	2012 TX_{223}	—	April 2, 2006	Kitt Peak	Spacewatch	AGN	1.2 km	MPC · JPL
576603	2012 TC_{224}	—	October 5, 2012	Mount Lemmon	Mount Lemmon Survey	·	1.9 km	MPC · JPL
576604	2012 TE_{225}	—	October 1, 2005	Kitt Peak	Spacewatch	·	470 m	MPC · JPL
576605	2012 TA_{230}	—	October 11, 2012	Kitt Peak	Spacewatch	·	1.7 km	MPC · JPL
576606	2012 TT_{232}	—	September 26, 2012	Catalina	CSS	·	2.5 km	MPC · JPL
576607	2012 TK_{233}	—	December 5, 2008	Kitt Peak	Spacewatch	HOF	2.8 km	MPC · JPL
576608	2012 TT_{235}	—	October 7, 2012	Haleakala	Pan-STARRS 1	·	2.3 km	MPC · JPL
576609	2012 TU_{238}	—	October 7, 2012	Haleakala	Pan-STARRS 1	·	1.8 km	MPC · JPL
576610	2012 TK_{245}	—	October 23, 2003	Apache Point	SDSS	GEF	1.2 km	MPC · JPL
576611	2012 TU_{246}	—	September 21, 2012	Kitt Peak	Spacewatch	·	1.7 km	MPC · JPL
576612	2012 TQ_{250}	—	October 11, 2012	Haleakala	Pan-STARRS 1	·	1.8 km	MPC · JPL
576613	2012 TL_{253}	—	October 11, 2012	Haleakala	Pan-STARRS 1	·	1.9 km	MPC · JPL
576614	2012 TJ_{254}	—	October 11, 2012	Piszkéstető	K. Sárneczky	EOS	1.6 km	MPC · JPL
576615	2012 TR_{255}	—	June 25, 2011	Nogales	M. Schwartz, P. R. Holvorcem	·	2.9 km	MPC · JPL
576616	2012 TQ_{259}	—	October 5, 2012	Haleakala	Pan-STARRS 1	HOF	2.1 km	MPC · JPL
576617	2012 TU_{261}	—	September 4, 2007	Mount Lemmon	Mount Lemmon Survey	KOR	870 m	MPC · JPL
576618	2012 TW_{263}	—	September 13, 2007	Mount Lemmon	Mount Lemmon Survey	KOR	1.1 km	MPC · JPL
576619	2012 TT_{264}	—	October 8, 2012	Haleakala	Pan-STARRS 1	·	1.5 km	MPC · JPL
576620	2012 TX_{264}	—	October 19, 2007	Mount Lemmon	Mount Lemmon Survey	·	1.9 km	MPC · JPL
576621	2012 TG_{265}	—	October 8, 2012	Haleakala	Pan-STARRS 1	·	2.0 km	MPC · JPL
576622	2012 TZ_{265}	—	October 8, 2012	Mount Lemmon	Mount Lemmon Survey	KOR	1.1 km	MPC · JPL
576623	2012 TD_{266}	—	October 8, 2012	Mount Lemmon	Mount Lemmon Survey	·	1.5 km	MPC · JPL
576624	2012 TW_{266}	—	October 8, 2012	Haleakala	Pan-STARRS 1	·	630 m	MPC · JPL
576625	2012 TU_{267}	—	October 8, 2012	Haleakala	Pan-STARRS 1	EOS	1.3 km	MPC · JPL
576626	2012 TF_{268}	—	September 16, 2012	Kitt Peak	Spacewatch	GEF	980 m	MPC · JPL
576627	2012 TR_{268}	—	November 8, 2008	Kitt Peak	Spacewatch	·	1.7 km	MPC · JPL
576628	2012 TY_{268}	—	October 11, 2012	Mount Lemmon	Mount Lemmon Survey	L5	6.7 km	MPC · JPL
576629	2012 TA_{273}	—	October 15, 2012	Mount Lemmon	Mount Lemmon Survey	KOR	1 km	MPC · JPL
576630	2012 TG_{274}	—	October 6, 2012	Mount Lemmon	Mount Lemmon Survey	·	2.3 km	MPC · JPL
576631	2012 TG_{275}	—	October 11, 2012	Haleakala	Pan-STARRS 1	·	3.1 km	MPC · JPL
576632	2012 TK_{276}	—	October 11, 2012	Haleakala	Pan-STARRS 1	L5	6.3 km	MPC · JPL
576633	2012 TM_{285}	—	October 23, 2003	Kitt Peak	Spacewatch	·	1.5 km	MPC · JPL
576634	2012 TG_{286}	—	January 27, 2003	Palomar	NEAT	·	3.4 km	MPC · JPL
576635	2012 TS_{286}	—	October 17, 2001	Socorro	LINEAR	·	3.3 km	MPC · JPL
576636	2012 TZ_{287}	—	October 10, 2012	Nogales	M. Schwartz, P. R. Holvorcem	EUP	3.1 km	MPC · JPL
576637	2012 TF_{288}	—	October 10, 2012	Mount Lemmon	Mount Lemmon Survey	·	1.7 km	MPC · JPL
576638	2012 TL_{290}	—	October 8, 2012	Haleakala	Pan-STARRS 1	·	1.6 km	MPC · JPL
576639	2012 TV_{290}	—	October 14, 1999	Kitt Peak	Spacewatch	·	490 m	MPC · JPL
576640	2012 TW_{291}	—	October 14, 2012	Kitt Peak	Spacewatch	EOS	1.8 km	MPC · JPL
576641	2012 TG_{292}	—	October 14, 2012	Kitt Peak	Spacewatch	·	1.9 km	MPC · JPL
576642	2012 TS_{294}	—	March 1, 2003	Cerro Tololo	Deep Lens Survey	·	3.0 km	MPC · JPL
576643	2012 TV_{296}	—	September 20, 2001	Socorro	LINEAR	·	1.9 km	MPC · JPL
576644	2012 TX_{300}	—	October 7, 2012	Haleakala	Pan-STARRS 1	·	3.4 km	MPC · JPL
576645	2012 TP_{303}	—	September 15, 2012	ESA OGS	ESA OGS	HNS	1.2 km	MPC · JPL
576646	2012 TF_{310}	—	October 11, 2012	Piszkéstető	K. Sárneczky	·	1.9 km	MPC · JPL
576647	2012 TL_{310}	—	September 27, 2002	Palomar	NEAT	·	880 m	MPC · JPL
576648	2012 TX_{314}	—	October 7, 2012	Haleakala	Pan-STARRS 1	JUN	1.2 km	MPC · JPL
576649	2012 TD_{315}	—	July 20, 2007	Lulin	LUSS	·	2.4 km	MPC · JPL
576650	2012 TF_{322}	—	November 18, 2009	Kitt Peak	Spacewatch	·	1.6 km	MPC · JPL
576651	2012 TY_{322}	—	October 1, 2003	Kitt Peak	Spacewatch	·	1.5 km	MPC · JPL
576652	2012 TG_{323}	—	August 10, 2007	Kitt Peak	Spacewatch	AGN	1.1 km	MPC · JPL
576653	2012 TO_{331}	—	October 9, 2012	Haleakala	Pan-STARRS 1	EOS	1.4 km	MPC · JPL
576654	2012 TR_{331}	—	October 11, 2012	Haleakala	Pan-STARRS 1	·	2.1 km	MPC · JPL
576655	2012 TU_{331}	—	October 14, 2012	Kitt Peak	Spacewatch	EOS	1.8 km	MPC · JPL
576656	2012 TK_{332}	—	October 11, 2012	Piszkéstető	K. Sárneczky	EOS	1.6 km	MPC · JPL
576657	2012 TB_{333}	—	October 10, 2012	Haleakala	Pan-STARRS 1	·	2.1 km	MPC · JPL
576658	2012 TF_{333}	—	October 10, 2012	Mount Lemmon	Mount Lemmon Survey	·	2.1 km	MPC · JPL
576659	2012 TG_{333}	—	December 11, 2013	Haleakala	Pan-STARRS 1	·	2.3 km	MPC · JPL
576660	2012 TK_{333}	—	October 4, 2012	Mount Lemmon	Mount Lemmon Survey	HOF	2.3 km	MPC · JPL
576661	2012 TO_{333}	—	October 11, 2012	Piszkéstető	K. Sárneczky	·	1.6 km	MPC · JPL
576662	2012 TT_{333}	—	October 8, 2012	Kitt Peak	Spacewatch	·	2.5 km	MPC · JPL
576663	2012 TU_{333}	—	October 6, 2012	Haleakala	Pan-STARRS 1	·	2.0 km	MPC · JPL
576664	2012 TL_{334}	—	September 30, 2017	Haleakala	Pan-STARRS 1	·	1.5 km	MPC · JPL
576665	2012 TS_{334}	—	January 2, 2014	Kitt Peak	Spacewatch	·	2.8 km	MPC · JPL
576666	2012 TE_{335}	—	October 15, 2012	Haleakala	Pan-STARRS 1	MAR	880 m	MPC · JPL
576667	2012 TW_{335}	—	January 21, 2015	Haleakala	Pan-STARRS 1	EOS	1.4 km	MPC · JPL
576668	2012 TB_{336}	—	October 10, 2012	Haleakala	Pan-STARRS 1	MAR	860 m	MPC · JPL
576669	2012 TP_{338}	—	May 17, 2016	Haleakala	Pan-STARRS 1	·	2.2 km	MPC · JPL
576670	2012 TS_{342}	—	October 8, 2012	Mount Lemmon	Mount Lemmon Survey	·	510 m	MPC · JPL
576671	2012 TM_{343}	—	October 14, 2012	Kitt Peak	Spacewatch	·	3.1 km	MPC · JPL
576672	2012 TU_{343}	—	September 30, 2017	Mount Lemmon	Mount Lemmon Survey	BRA	1.6 km	MPC · JPL
576673	2012 TA_{345}	—	October 5, 2013	Haleakala	Pan-STARRS 1	L5	7.6 km	MPC · JPL
576674	2012 TB_{345}	—	January 9, 2014	Haleakala	Pan-STARRS 1	·	2.3 km	MPC · JPL
576675	2012 TN_{345}	—	October 8, 2012	Haleakala	Pan-STARRS 1	EOS	1.6 km	MPC · JPL
576676	2012 TE_{348}	—	October 10, 2012	Mount Lemmon	Mount Lemmon Survey	·	2.3 km	MPC · JPL
576677	2012 TL_{350}	—	January 4, 2014	Mount Lemmon	Mount Lemmon Survey	·	2.3 km	MPC · JPL
576678	2012 TM_{350}	—	January 28, 2015	Haleakala	Pan-STARRS 1	EOS	1.5 km	MPC · JPL
576679	2012 TR_{350}	—	October 3, 2013	Mount Lemmon	Mount Lemmon Survey	L5	7.0 km	MPC · JPL
576680	2012 TH_{352}	—	October 8, 2012	Mount Lemmon	Mount Lemmon Survey	·	1.7 km	MPC · JPL
576681	2012 TM_{355}	—	October 11, 2012	Haleakala	Pan-STARRS 1	·	2.3 km	MPC · JPL
576682	2012 TN_{355}	—	October 8, 2012	Haleakala	Pan-STARRS 1	·	1.2 km	MPC · JPL
576683	2012 TV_{356}	—	October 11, 2012	Haleakala	Pan-STARRS 1	·	490 m	MPC · JPL
576684	2012 TZ_{356}	—	October 8, 2012	Mount Lemmon	Mount Lemmon Survey	·	2.3 km	MPC · JPL
576685	2012 TG_{357}	—	October 10, 2012	Mount Lemmon	Mount Lemmon Survey	·	1.5 km	MPC · JPL
576686	2012 TH_{357}	—	October 14, 2012	Kitt Peak	Spacewatch	·	1.1 km	MPC · JPL
576687	2012 TD_{358}	—	October 9, 2012	Mount Lemmon	Mount Lemmon Survey	L5	6.7 km	MPC · JPL
576688	2012 TG_{358}	—	October 13, 2012	Catalina	CSS	·	2.1 km	MPC · JPL
576689	2012 TW_{358}	—	October 6, 2012	Mount Lemmon	Mount Lemmon Survey	·	1.5 km	MPC · JPL
576690	2012 TE_{359}	—	October 9, 2012	Haleakala	Pan-STARRS 1	KOR	1.0 km	MPC · JPL
576691	2012 TQ_{359}	—	October 8, 2012	Mount Lemmon	Mount Lemmon Survey	HOF	1.9 km	MPC · JPL
576692	2012 TB_{360}	—	October 8, 2012	Mount Lemmon	Mount Lemmon Survey	·	1.3 km	MPC · JPL
576693	2012 TW_{362}	—	October 15, 2012	Haleakala	Pan-STARRS 1	HOF	2.2 km	MPC · JPL
576694	2012 TY_{362}	—	October 7, 2012	Haleakala	Pan-STARRS 1	·	2.2 km	MPC · JPL
576695	2012 TO_{363}	—	October 10, 2012	Haleakala	Pan-STARRS 1	·	900 m	MPC · JPL
576696	2012 TP_{365}	—	October 7, 2012	Haleakala	Pan-STARRS 1	L5	9.1 km	MPC · JPL
576697	2012 TK_{369}	—	October 8, 2012	Haleakala	Pan-STARRS 1	·	4.0 km	MPC · JPL
576698	2012 UM_{4}	—	October 16, 2012	Mount Lemmon	Mount Lemmon Survey	·	1.9 km	MPC · JPL
576699	2012 UJ_{5}	—	August 8, 2005	Cerro Tololo	Deep Ecliptic Survey	·	2.2 km	MPC · JPL
576700	2012 UT_{8}	—	October 24, 2008	Kitt Peak	Spacewatch	·	1.2 km	MPC · JPL

== 576701–576800 ==
back to top

Designation			Discovery			Properties		Ref
Permanent	Provisional	Named after	Date	Site	Discoverer(s)	Category	Diam.	Ref
576701	2012 UD_{10}	—	October 8, 2012	Mount Lemmon	Mount Lemmon Survey	·	1.7 km	MPC · JPL
576702	2012 UV_{10}	—	September 13, 2007	Mount Lemmon	Mount Lemmon Survey	KOR	1.3 km	MPC · JPL
576703	2012 UD_{12}	—	October 16, 2012	Mount Lemmon	Mount Lemmon Survey	·	1.9 km	MPC · JPL
576704	2012 UH_{13}	—	October 8, 2012	Mount Lemmon	Mount Lemmon Survey	·	1.8 km	MPC · JPL
576705	2012 UL_{13}	—	October 16, 2012	Mount Lemmon	Mount Lemmon Survey	·	2.2 km	MPC · JPL
576706	2012 UV_{14}	—	October 8, 2007	Mount Lemmon	Mount Lemmon Survey	KOR	1.1 km	MPC · JPL
576707	2012 UZ_{15}	—	October 16, 2012	Mount Lemmon	Mount Lemmon Survey	·	1.4 km	MPC · JPL
576708	2012 UM_{16}	—	May 2, 2006	Mount Lemmon	Mount Lemmon Survey	·	1.3 km	MPC · JPL
576709	2012 UC_{23}	—	October 17, 2012	Mount Lemmon	Mount Lemmon Survey	·	1.5 km	MPC · JPL
576710	2012 UJ_{23}	—	October 17, 2012	Mount Lemmon	Mount Lemmon Survey	·	2.5 km	MPC · JPL
576711	2012 UT_{26}	—	October 17, 2012	Mount Lemmon	Mount Lemmon Survey	·	2.1 km	MPC · JPL
576712	2012 US_{28}	—	October 6, 2012	Mount Lemmon	Mount Lemmon Survey	·	620 m	MPC · JPL
576713	2012 UU_{31}	—	December 29, 2008	Mount Lemmon	Mount Lemmon Survey	·	2.0 km	MPC · JPL
576714	2012 UE_{32}	—	October 17, 2012	Mount Lemmon	Mount Lemmon Survey	EOS	1.8 km	MPC · JPL
576715	2012 UF_{32}	—	October 17, 2012	Mount Lemmon	Mount Lemmon Survey	·	3.0 km	MPC · JPL
576716	2012 UG_{32}	—	October 11, 2012	Piszkéstető	K. Sárneczky	EOS	2.3 km	MPC · JPL
576717	2012 UO_{34}	—	October 20, 2012	Mount Lemmon	Mount Lemmon Survey	L4	10 km	MPC · JPL
576718	2012 UR_{41}	—	August 10, 2007	Kitt Peak	Spacewatch	·	1.4 km	MPC · JPL
576719	2012 UX_{47}	—	October 18, 2012	Haleakala	Pan-STARRS 1	KOR	1.0 km	MPC · JPL
576720	2012 UG_{49}	—	September 16, 2012	Mount Lemmon	Mount Lemmon Survey	·	1.6 km	MPC · JPL
576721	2012 UM_{52}	—	October 8, 2012	Kitt Peak	Spacewatch	·	2.1 km	MPC · JPL
576722	2012 UX_{52}	—	October 8, 2012	Catalina	CSS	·	2.7 km	MPC · JPL
576723	2012 UZ_{54}	—	October 19, 2012	Haleakala	Pan-STARRS 1	·	1.4 km	MPC · JPL
576724	2012 UB_{57}	—	October 20, 2007	Mount Lemmon	Mount Lemmon Survey	·	1.7 km	MPC · JPL
576725	2012 UB_{61}	—	October 1, 2011	Piszkéstető	K. Sárneczky	·	3.2 km	MPC · JPL
576726	2012 UN_{65}	—	May 25, 2006	Kitt Peak	Spacewatch	·	1.8 km	MPC · JPL
576727	2012 UC_{66}	—	April 29, 2011	Mount Lemmon	Mount Lemmon Survey	·	630 m	MPC · JPL
576728	2012 UD_{67}	—	October 20, 2012	Haleakala	Pan-STARRS 1	T_{j} (2.98)	2.8 km	MPC · JPL
576729	2012 UN_{72}	—	September 13, 2007	Kitt Peak	Spacewatch	KOR	1.1 km	MPC · JPL
576730	2012 UQ_{79}	—	September 15, 2007	Mount Lemmon	Mount Lemmon Survey	·	2.0 km	MPC · JPL
576731	2012 UF_{80}	—	November 1, 2007	Kitt Peak	Spacewatch	EOS	1.8 km	MPC · JPL
576732	2012 UB_{82}	—	October 20, 2012	Kitt Peak	Spacewatch	RAF	720 m	MPC · JPL
576733	2012 UK_{85}	—	October 9, 2012	Mount Lemmon	Mount Lemmon Survey	AGN	1.0 km	MPC · JPL
576734	2012 UM_{89}	—	October 9, 2012	Mount Lemmon	Mount Lemmon Survey	NEM	2.0 km	MPC · JPL
576735	2012 UB_{90}	—	October 18, 2001	Palomar	NEAT	·	2.6 km	MPC · JPL
576736	2012 UV_{90}	—	September 12, 2007	Kitt Peak	Spacewatch	KOR	1.2 km	MPC · JPL
576737	2012 UH_{91}	—	October 5, 2012	Kitt Peak	Spacewatch	H	420 m	MPC · JPL
576738	2012 UF_{95}	—	January 16, 2004	Palomar	NEAT	·	2.1 km	MPC · JPL
576739	2012 UG_{101}	—	October 8, 2002	Kitt Peak	Spacewatch	·	1.7 km	MPC · JPL
576740	2012 UN_{101}	—	October 20, 2007	Kitt Peak	Spacewatch	·	1.4 km	MPC · JPL
576741	2012 UQ_{101}	—	October 18, 2012	Haleakala	Pan-STARRS 1	·	1.3 km	MPC · JPL
576742	2012 UW_{105}	—	October 19, 2012	Haleakala	Pan-STARRS 1	·	2.5 km	MPC · JPL
576743	2012 UX_{105}	—	November 7, 2007	Kitt Peak	Spacewatch	EOS	1.8 km	MPC · JPL
576744	2012 UK_{107}	—	November 13, 2007	Kitt Peak	Spacewatch	·	3.2 km	MPC · JPL
576745	2012 US_{108}	—	October 19, 2012	Haleakala	Pan-STARRS 1	KOR	1.2 km	MPC · JPL
576746	2012 UH_{114}	—	October 11, 2012	Haleakala	Pan-STARRS 1	MRX	930 m	MPC · JPL
576747	2012 US_{115}	—	September 28, 2006	Kitt Peak	Spacewatch	·	2.2 km	MPC · JPL
576748	2012 UK_{116}	—	February 11, 2004	Palomar	NEAT	·	2.0 km	MPC · JPL
576749	2012 UU_{116}	—	November 3, 2007	Kitt Peak	Spacewatch	·	2.2 km	MPC · JPL
576750	2012 UP_{119}	—	November 11, 2009	Kitt Peak	Spacewatch	·	1.1 km	MPC · JPL
576751	2012 UA_{122}	—	October 15, 2012	Kitt Peak	Spacewatch	GEF	1.1 km	MPC · JPL
576752	2012 UB_{124}	—	October 22, 2012	Haleakala	Pan-STARRS 1	·	1.5 km	MPC · JPL
576753	2012 UR_{125}	—	October 10, 2012	Mount Lemmon	Mount Lemmon Survey	TIR	3.0 km	MPC · JPL
576754	2012 UK_{128}	—	October 18, 2012	Mount Lemmon	Mount Lemmon Survey	EOS	1.7 km	MPC · JPL
576755	2012 UT_{128}	—	June 25, 2011	Mount Lemmon	Mount Lemmon Survey	EOS	2.1 km	MPC · JPL
576756	2012 UU_{129}	—	October 19, 2012	Mount Lemmon	Mount Lemmon Survey	·	2.2 km	MPC · JPL
576757	2012 UB_{130}	—	October 19, 2012	Haleakala	Pan-STARRS 1	·	2.6 km	MPC · JPL
576758	2012 UL_{131}	—	November 19, 2003	Kitt Peak	Spacewatch	·	2.6 km	MPC · JPL
576759	2012 UB_{133}	—	October 18, 2012	Mount Lemmon	Mount Lemmon Survey	TIN	1.1 km	MPC · JPL
576760	2012 UD_{133}	—	December 22, 2008	Mount Lemmon	Mount Lemmon Survey	·	2.0 km	MPC · JPL
576761	2012 UV_{133}	—	September 13, 2007	Lulin	LUSS	·	2.1 km	MPC · JPL
576762	2012 UZ_{135}	—	October 10, 2007	Kitt Peak	Spacewatch	·	2.9 km	MPC · JPL
576763	2012 UR_{136}	—	October 20, 2012	Haleakala	Pan-STARRS 1	AMO · PHA	500 m	MPC · JPL
576764	2012 UB_{138}	—	October 22, 2012	Haleakala	Pan-STARRS 1	·	500 m	MPC · JPL
576765	2012 UP_{138}	—	October 21, 2012	Mount Lemmon	Mount Lemmon Survey	L4	10 km	MPC · JPL
576766	2012 UJ_{142}	—	November 13, 2007	Kitt Peak	Spacewatch	EOS	1.5 km	MPC · JPL
576767	2012 UH_{146}	—	October 19, 2012	Mount Lemmon	Mount Lemmon Survey	·	1.8 km	MPC · JPL
576768	2012 UE_{148}	—	October 20, 2012	Haleakala	Pan-STARRS 1	·	1.1 km	MPC · JPL
576769	2012 UO_{150}	—	October 21, 2012	Kitt Peak	Spacewatch	WIT	1.1 km	MPC · JPL
576770	2012 UO_{151}	—	April 2, 2005	Kitt Peak	Spacewatch	·	2.2 km	MPC · JPL
576771	2012 UD_{152}	—	October 21, 2012	Kitt Peak	Spacewatch	HNS	890 m	MPC · JPL
576772	2012 UZ_{153}	—	October 21, 2012	Haleakala	Pan-STARRS 1	·	1.3 km	MPC · JPL
576773	2012 UX_{154}	—	August 5, 2002	Palomar	NEAT	·	1.9 km	MPC · JPL
576774	2012 UK_{155}	—	November 18, 2001	Apache Point	SDSS Collaboration	·	2.3 km	MPC · JPL
576775	2012 UH_{157}	—	December 22, 2008	Kitt Peak	Spacewatch	·	1.9 km	MPC · JPL
576776	2012 UQ_{157}	—	October 23, 2012	Haleakala	Pan-STARRS 1	·	780 m	MPC · JPL
576777	2012 UF_{161}	—	February 18, 2004	Kitt Peak	Spacewatch	·	2.5 km	MPC · JPL
576778	2012 UT_{161}	—	December 18, 2001	Kitt Peak	Spacewatch	LIX	3.1 km	MPC · JPL
576779	2012 UT_{162}	—	October 22, 2012	Kitt Peak	Spacewatch	·	2.4 km	MPC · JPL
576780	2012 UD_{164}	—	January 25, 2003	Palomar	NEAT	·	2.7 km	MPC · JPL
576781	2012 UO_{164}	—	February 18, 2004	Kitt Peak	Spacewatch	·	1.9 km	MPC · JPL
576782	2012 UH_{168}	—	November 18, 2003	Kitt Peak	Spacewatch	GEF	1.1 km	MPC · JPL
576783	2012 UD_{171}	—	January 10, 2006	Mount Lemmon	Mount Lemmon Survey	PHO	740 m	MPC · JPL
576784	2012 UE_{172}	—	August 24, 2006	Palomar	NEAT	·	2.1 km	MPC · JPL
576785	2012 UK_{175}	—	May 22, 2011	Mount Lemmon	Mount Lemmon Survey	·	2.6 km	MPC · JPL
576786	2012 UM_{179}	—	October 10, 2007	Mount Lemmon	Mount Lemmon Survey	·	1.4 km	MPC · JPL
576787	2012 UN_{179}	—	November 5, 2007	Mount Lemmon	Mount Lemmon Survey	·	1.5 km	MPC · JPL
576788	2012 UZ_{179}	—	October 18, 2012	Haleakala	Pan-STARRS 1	EOS	1.4 km	MPC · JPL
576789	2012 UH_{180}	—	November 19, 2003	Kitt Peak	Spacewatch	·	1.9 km	MPC · JPL
576790	2012 UN_{180}	—	October 20, 2012	Kitt Peak	Spacewatch	·	1.6 km	MPC · JPL
576791	2012 UL_{183}	—	August 2, 2011	Haleakala	Pan-STARRS 1	KOR	1.2 km	MPC · JPL
576792	2012 UQ_{184}	—	October 17, 2012	Haleakala	Pan-STARRS 1	EOS	1.4 km	MPC · JPL
576793 Károlyiamy	2012 UN_{185}	Károlyiamy	October 20, 2012	Piszkéstető	K. Sárneczky, A. Király	·	1.7 km	MPC · JPL
576794	2012 UY_{185}	—	October 23, 2012	Haleakala	Pan-STARRS 1	·	1.8 km	MPC · JPL
576795	2012 US_{186}	—	October 22, 2012	Haleakala	Pan-STARRS 1	·	2.9 km	MPC · JPL
576796	2012 UU_{186}	—	October 21, 2012	Mount Lemmon	Mount Lemmon Survey	·	1.6 km	MPC · JPL
576797	2012 UK_{187}	—	October 20, 2012	Kitt Peak	Spacewatch	·	1.6 km	MPC · JPL
576798	2012 UL_{187}	—	October 18, 2012	Mount Lemmon	Mount Lemmon Survey	·	1.8 km	MPC · JPL
576799	2012 UW_{187}	—	October 17, 2012	Mount Lemmon	Mount Lemmon Survey	·	1.9 km	MPC · JPL
576800	2012 UY_{187}	—	October 18, 2012	Mount Lemmon	Mount Lemmon Survey	·	1.8 km	MPC · JPL

== 576801–576900 ==
back to top

Designation			Discovery			Properties		Ref
Permanent	Provisional	Named after	Date	Site	Discoverer(s)	Category	Diam.	Ref
576801	2012 UJ_{188}	—	October 22, 2012	Haleakala	Pan-STARRS 1	·	2.1 km	MPC · JPL
576802	2012 UE_{189}	—	October 22, 2012	Haleakala	Pan-STARRS 1	·	2.7 km	MPC · JPL
576803	2012 UM_{190}	—	September 27, 2017	Haleakala	Pan-STARRS 1	EOS	1.4 km	MPC · JPL
576804	2012 UK_{197}	—	October 21, 2012	Haleakala	Pan-STARRS 1	NYS	860 m	MPC · JPL
576805	2012 US_{199}	—	June 7, 2015	Haleakala	Pan-STARRS 1	·	1.1 km	MPC · JPL
576806	2012 UA_{202}	—	October 18, 2012	Haleakala	Pan-STARRS 1	·	650 m	MPC · JPL
576807	2012 UZ_{207}	—	October 18, 2012	Haleakala	Pan-STARRS 1	·	1.6 km	MPC · JPL
576808	2012 UL_{209}	—	October 18, 2012	Haleakala	Pan-STARRS 1	·	560 m	MPC · JPL
576809	2012 UZ_{210}	—	October 17, 2012	Mount Lemmon	Mount Lemmon Survey	·	630 m	MPC · JPL
576810	2012 UL_{212}	—	October 20, 2012	Mount Lemmon	Mount Lemmon Survey	EOS	1.5 km	MPC · JPL
576811	2012 UM_{212}	—	October 22, 2012	Haleakala	Pan-STARRS 1	·	2.1 km	MPC · JPL
576812	2012 UT_{213}	—	October 18, 2012	Haleakala	Pan-STARRS 1	·	1.2 km	MPC · JPL
576813	2012 UV_{213}	—	October 22, 2012	Haleakala	Pan-STARRS 1	EOS	1.3 km	MPC · JPL
576814	2012 UW_{217}	—	October 8, 2012	Mount Lemmon	Mount Lemmon Survey	·	1.5 km	MPC · JPL
576815	2012 UP_{220}	—	October 16, 2012	Mount Lemmon	Mount Lemmon Survey	KOR	1.2 km	MPC · JPL
576816	2012 UM_{225}	—	October 17, 2012	Haleakala	Pan-STARRS 1	KOR	980 m	MPC · JPL
576817	2012 UV_{227}	—	October 18, 2012	Haleakala	Pan-STARRS 1	·	2.4 km	MPC · JPL
576818	2012 UY_{227}	—	October 22, 2012	Mount Lemmon	Mount Lemmon Survey	VER	2.4 km	MPC · JPL
576819	2012 UG_{228}	—	October 24, 2012	Haleakala	Pan-STARRS 1	·	2.4 km	MPC · JPL
576820	2012 VC_{1}	—	October 19, 2012	Mount Lemmon	Mount Lemmon Survey	·	3.5 km	MPC · JPL
576821	2012 VU_{2}	—	October 26, 2012	Mount Lemmon	Mount Lemmon Survey	·	1.8 km	MPC · JPL
576822	2012 VU_{8}	—	May 25, 2011	Mount Lemmon	Mount Lemmon Survey	·	690 m	MPC · JPL
576823	2012 VC_{12}	—	March 18, 2010	Mount Lemmon	Mount Lemmon Survey	WIT	730 m	MPC · JPL
576824	2012 VQ_{12}	—	September 11, 2007	Mount Lemmon	Mount Lemmon Survey	KOR	1.3 km	MPC · JPL
576825	2012 VW_{12}	—	October 11, 2007	Mount Lemmon	Mount Lemmon Survey	·	2.2 km	MPC · JPL
576826	2012 VH_{14}	—	October 18, 2012	Haleakala	Pan-STARRS 1	KOR	1.2 km	MPC · JPL
576827	2012 VK_{17}	—	October 6, 2012	Mount Lemmon	Mount Lemmon Survey	·	410 m	MPC · JPL
576828	2012 VS_{18}	—	June 27, 2011	Kitt Peak	Spacewatch	·	2.0 km	MPC · JPL
576829	2012 VW_{18}	—	August 20, 2000	Kitt Peak	Spacewatch	·	3.3 km	MPC · JPL
576830	2012 VV_{20}	—	October 16, 2012	Catalina	CSS	·	500 m	MPC · JPL
576831	2012 VF_{21}	—	April 26, 2006	Cerro Tololo	Deep Ecliptic Survey	·	2.4 km	MPC · JPL
576832	2012 VL_{21}	—	October 20, 2012	Kitt Peak	Spacewatch	·	1.3 km	MPC · JPL
576833	2012 VU_{22}	—	October 14, 2007	Mount Lemmon	Mount Lemmon Survey	EOS	1.3 km	MPC · JPL
576834	2012 VF_{25}	—	November 6, 2012	Mount Lemmon	Mount Lemmon Survey	NEM	1.8 km	MPC · JPL
576835	2012 VO_{26}	—	October 23, 2012	Mount Lemmon	Mount Lemmon Survey	·	1.0 km	MPC · JPL
576836	2012 VW_{26}	—	May 25, 2006	Mauna Kea	P. A. Wiegert	·	1.4 km	MPC · JPL
576837	2012 VL_{27}	—	May 6, 2006	Siding Spring	SSS	(18466)	3.3 km	MPC · JPL
576838	2012 VY_{29}	—	May 2, 2005	Reedy Creek	J. Broughton	·	2.6 km	MPC · JPL
576839	2012 VD_{30}	—	January 16, 2009	Mount Lemmon	Mount Lemmon Survey	KOR	1.3 km	MPC · JPL
576840	2012 VE_{30}	—	March 10, 2005	Mount Lemmon	Mount Lemmon Survey	·	1.7 km	MPC · JPL
576841	2012 VH_{32}	—	October 21, 2012	Haleakala	Pan-STARRS 1	·	1.8 km	MPC · JPL
576842	2012 VX_{37}	—	October 21, 2012	Mount Lemmon	Mount Lemmon Survey	·	560 m	MPC · JPL
576843	2012 VN_{39}	—	September 23, 2008	Mount Lemmon	Mount Lemmon Survey	·	1.3 km	MPC · JPL
576844	2012 VQ_{40}	—	April 7, 2005	Mount Lemmon	Mount Lemmon Survey	KOR	1.3 km	MPC · JPL
576845	2012 VU_{42}	—	November 6, 2012	Mount Lemmon	Mount Lemmon Survey	·	1.9 km	MPC · JPL
576846	2012 VG_{44}	—	October 20, 2012	Kitt Peak	Spacewatch	·	1.8 km	MPC · JPL
576847	2012 VL_{44}	—	November 7, 2012	Mount Lemmon	Mount Lemmon Survey	H	400 m	MPC · JPL
576848	2012 VR_{51}	—	November 6, 2012	Kitt Peak	Spacewatch	·	580 m	MPC · JPL
576849	2012 VN_{53}	—	October 30, 2007	Kitt Peak	Spacewatch	·	1.5 km	MPC · JPL
576850	2012 VF_{56}	—	March 20, 1999	Apache Point	SDSS	·	1.2 km	MPC · JPL
576851	2012 VS_{56}	—	October 21, 2006	Palomar	NEAT	·	3.7 km	MPC · JPL
576852	2012 VA_{59}	—	October 6, 1996	Kitt Peak	Spacewatch	·	550 m	MPC · JPL
576853 Rafalreszelewski	2012 VS_{61}	Rafalreszelewski	October 16, 2012	Tincana	M. Kusiak, M. Żołnowski	·	2.4 km	MPC · JPL
576854	2012 VG_{63}	—	October 18, 2012	Haleakala	Pan-STARRS 1	·	630 m	MPC · JPL
576855	2012 VT_{64}	—	February 22, 2009	Kitt Peak	Spacewatch	·	2.3 km	MPC · JPL
576856	2012 VR_{65}	—	October 21, 2012	Haleakala	Pan-STARRS 1	GEF	1.0 km	MPC · JPL
576857	2012 VC_{67}	—	September 18, 2003	Palomar	NEAT	·	1.3 km	MPC · JPL
576858	2012 VL_{71}	—	October 25, 2012	Kitt Peak	Spacewatch	THM	1.6 km	MPC · JPL
576859	2012 VL_{75}	—	May 6, 2006	Mount Lemmon	Mount Lemmon Survey	·	1.6 km	MPC · JPL
576860	2012 VW_{77}	—	October 20, 2012	Mount Lemmon	Mount Lemmon Survey	·	650 m	MPC · JPL
576861	2012 VF_{78}	—	April 9, 2010	Mount Lemmon	Mount Lemmon Survey	·	2.2 km	MPC · JPL
576862	2012 VD_{79}	—	July 22, 2007	Lulin	LUSS	·	1.8 km	MPC · JPL
576863	2012 VL_{81}	—	October 21, 2012	Haleakala	Pan-STARRS 1	GEF	1.1 km	MPC · JPL
576864	2012 VV_{84}	—	December 21, 2006	Kitt Peak	L. H. Wasserman, M. W. Buie	·	660 m	MPC · JPL
576865	2012 VN_{86}	—	November 14, 2012	Ka-Dar	Gerke, V.	EOS	1.6 km	MPC · JPL
576866	2012 VJ_{87}	—	October 15, 2012	Kitt Peak	Spacewatch	EOS	2.2 km	MPC · JPL
576867	2012 VT_{91}	—	November 14, 2012	Kitt Peak	Spacewatch	·	890 m	MPC · JPL
576868	2012 VW_{94}	—	October 15, 2007	Mount Lemmon	Mount Lemmon Survey	·	1.6 km	MPC · JPL
576869	2012 VT_{99}	—	September 19, 2006	Catalina	CSS	EOS	2.4 km	MPC · JPL
576870 Országlili	2012 VZ_{99}	Országlili	October 18, 2012	Piszkéstető	K. Sárneczky, G. Hodosán	·	3.8 km	MPC · JPL
576871	2012 VE_{100}	—	March 19, 2010	Mount Lemmon	Mount Lemmon Survey	·	2.6 km	MPC · JPL
576872	2012 VH_{102}	—	November 12, 2012	Mount Lemmon	Mount Lemmon Survey	·	1.3 km	MPC · JPL
576873	2012 VO_{103}	—	November 13, 2012	Mount Lemmon	Mount Lemmon Survey	·	600 m	MPC · JPL
576874	2012 VX_{104}	—	October 8, 2012	Mount Lemmon	Mount Lemmon Survey	·	1.8 km	MPC · JPL
576875	2012 VE_{110}	—	September 29, 2003	Kitt Peak	Spacewatch	·	1.3 km	MPC · JPL
576876	2012 VE_{112}	—	March 27, 2009	Mount Lemmon	Mount Lemmon Survey	·	3.4 km	MPC · JPL
576877	2012 VH_{116}	—	November 27, 2013	Haleakala	Pan-STARRS 1	·	1.5 km	MPC · JPL
576878	2012 VU_{117}	—	February 24, 2014	Haleakala	Pan-STARRS 1	·	1.9 km	MPC · JPL
576879	2012 VH_{118}	—	November 12, 2012	Mount Lemmon	Mount Lemmon Survey	EOS	1.2 km	MPC · JPL
576880	2012 VM_{120}	—	November 4, 2012	Mount Lemmon	Mount Lemmon Survey	·	1.8 km	MPC · JPL
576881	2012 VU_{121}	—	November 14, 2012	Kitt Peak	Spacewatch	·	2.0 km	MPC · JPL
576882	2012 VU_{124}	—	September 30, 2017	Mount Lemmon	Mount Lemmon Survey	·	1.8 km	MPC · JPL
576883	2012 VF_{127}	—	November 4, 2012	Kitt Peak	Spacewatch	·	2.9 km	MPC · JPL
576884	2012 VV_{127}	—	November 7, 2012	Haleakala	Pan-STARRS 1	·	1.8 km	MPC · JPL
576885	2012 VP_{133}	—	November 7, 2012	Mount Lemmon	Mount Lemmon Survey	·	2.2 km	MPC · JPL
576886	2012 WQ	—	November 16, 2012	Charleston	R. Holmes	EOS	1.7 km	MPC · JPL
576887	2012 WQ_{5}	—	October 21, 2006	Mount Lemmon	Mount Lemmon Survey	·	2.2 km	MPC · JPL
576888	2012 WK_{6}	—	November 13, 2007	Kitt Peak	Spacewatch	·	1.5 km	MPC · JPL
576889	2012 WX_{6}	—	April 21, 2004	Campo Imperatore	CINEOS	·	570 m	MPC · JPL
576890	2012 WK_{8}	—	March 23, 2004	Kitt Peak	Spacewatch	·	1.9 km	MPC · JPL
576891	2012 WQ_{8}	—	October 17, 2001	Palomar	NEAT	·	1.9 km	MPC · JPL
576892	2012 WK_{12}	—	October 22, 2012	Mount Lemmon	Mount Lemmon Survey	TIR	2.5 km	MPC · JPL
576893	2012 WQ_{15}	—	December 5, 2007	Kitt Peak	Spacewatch	·	1.9 km	MPC · JPL
576894	2012 WZ_{18}	—	October 20, 2006	Mount Lemmon	Mount Lemmon Survey	VER	2.8 km	MPC · JPL
576895	2012 WA_{20}	—	October 16, 2007	Mount Lemmon	Mount Lemmon Survey	KOR	1.5 km	MPC · JPL
576896	2012 WA_{21}	—	September 27, 2006	Kitt Peak	Spacewatch	·	2.6 km	MPC · JPL
576897	2012 WM_{21}	—	January 31, 2009	Mount Lemmon	Mount Lemmon Survey	·	2.0 km	MPC · JPL
576898	2012 WB_{26}	—	October 27, 2012	Mount Lemmon	Mount Lemmon Survey	TIR	3.5 km	MPC · JPL
576899	2012 WH_{26}	—	December 20, 2001	Palomar	NEAT	TIR	2.7 km	MPC · JPL
576900	2012 WW_{26}	—	August 31, 2005	Kitt Peak	Spacewatch	·	550 m	MPC · JPL

== 576901–577000 ==
back to top

Designation			Discovery			Properties		Ref
Permanent	Provisional	Named after	Date	Site	Discoverer(s)	Category	Diam.	Ref
576901 Adagio	2012 WM_{27}	Adagio	January 28, 2008	Belesta	Martinez, P.	·	2.4 km	MPC · JPL
576902	2012 WS_{36}	—	November 23, 2012	Kitt Peak	Spacewatch	·	1.8 km	MPC · JPL
576903	2012 WF_{41}	—	November 22, 2012	Kitt Peak	Spacewatch	·	2.7 km	MPC · JPL
576904	2012 WV_{42}	—	November 16, 2012	Haleakala	Pan-STARRS 1	·	1.9 km	MPC · JPL
576905	2012 XX	—	October 29, 2005	Mount Lemmon	Mount Lemmon Survey	·	390 m	MPC · JPL
576906	2012 XC_{1}	—	October 22, 2012	Kitt Peak	Spacewatch	EOS	1.7 km	MPC · JPL
576907	2012 XE_{3}	—	November 7, 2012	Mount Lemmon	Mount Lemmon Survey	·	560 m	MPC · JPL
576908	2012 XW_{6}	—	December 5, 2012	Mount Lemmon	Mount Lemmon Survey	·	530 m	MPC · JPL
576909	2012 XM_{10}	—	November 7, 2012	Mount Lemmon	Mount Lemmon Survey	·	1.6 km	MPC · JPL
576910	2012 XH_{12}	—	November 17, 2012	Mount Lemmon	Mount Lemmon Survey	·	1.5 km	MPC · JPL
576911	2012 XV_{12}	—	December 4, 2012	Mount Lemmon	Mount Lemmon Survey	·	1.3 km	MPC · JPL
576912	2012 XR_{14}	—	December 5, 2012	Mount Lemmon	Mount Lemmon Survey	·	2.1 km	MPC · JPL
576913	2012 XV_{17}	—	December 2, 2012	Mount Lemmon	Mount Lemmon Survey	·	1.8 km	MPC · JPL
576914	2012 XK_{19}	—	December 2, 2012	Mount Lemmon	Mount Lemmon Survey	·	2.8 km	MPC · JPL
576915	2012 XU_{19}	—	January 23, 2003	La Silla	A. Boattini, Hainaut, O.	·	2.3 km	MPC · JPL
576916	2012 XD_{21}	—	November 3, 2007	Kitt Peak	Spacewatch	·	1.5 km	MPC · JPL
576917	2012 XM_{25}	—	November 17, 2012	Kitt Peak	Spacewatch	EOS	1.9 km	MPC · JPL
576918	2012 XA_{27}	—	November 5, 2007	Kitt Peak	Spacewatch	KOR	1.2 km	MPC · JPL
576919	2012 XR_{27}	—	November 7, 2012	Mount Lemmon	Mount Lemmon Survey	·	2.0 km	MPC · JPL
576920	2012 XY_{27}	—	November 23, 2012	Kitt Peak	Spacewatch	·	1.6 km	MPC · JPL
576921	2012 XG_{29}	—	August 12, 2001	Haleakala	NEAT	·	1.6 km	MPC · JPL
576922	2012 XR_{30}	—	August 2, 2011	Haleakala	Pan-STARRS 1	EOS	1.5 km	MPC · JPL
576923	2012 XY_{31}	—	December 3, 2012	Mount Lemmon	Mount Lemmon Survey	·	2.8 km	MPC · JPL
576924	2012 XU_{42}	—	October 2, 2006	Mount Lemmon	Mount Lemmon Survey	HYG	1.9 km	MPC · JPL
576925	2012 XB_{43}	—	December 3, 2012	Mount Lemmon	Mount Lemmon Survey	·	1.1 km	MPC · JPL
576926	2012 XF_{44}	—	December 3, 2012	Mount Lemmon	Mount Lemmon Survey	·	2.3 km	MPC · JPL
576927	2012 XG_{45}	—	December 3, 2012	Mount Lemmon	Mount Lemmon Survey	·	660 m	MPC · JPL
576928	2012 XX_{45}	—	November 7, 2012	Haleakala	Pan-STARRS 1	EOS	1.3 km	MPC · JPL
576929	2012 XH_{49}	—	October 25, 2012	Kitt Peak	Spacewatch	·	740 m	MPC · JPL
576930	2012 XL_{52}	—	December 13, 2006	Mount Lemmon	Mount Lemmon Survey	·	3.7 km	MPC · JPL
576931	2012 XO_{52}	—	July 31, 2005	Palomar	NEAT	·	3.9 km	MPC · JPL
576932	2012 XT_{53}	—	April 2, 2009	Mount Lemmon	Mount Lemmon Survey	EOS	1.6 km	MPC · JPL
576933	2012 XW_{56}	—	November 14, 2007	Kitt Peak	Spacewatch	TEL	1.1 km	MPC · JPL
576934	2012 XO_{58}	—	August 8, 2002	Palomar	NEAT	·	730 m	MPC · JPL
576935	2012 XJ_{61}	—	December 4, 2012	Mount Lemmon	Mount Lemmon Survey	·	1.8 km	MPC · JPL
576936	2012 XU_{63}	—	December 4, 2012	Mount Lemmon	Mount Lemmon Survey	·	1.7 km	MPC · JPL
576937	2012 XT_{64}	—	December 4, 2012	Mount Lemmon	Mount Lemmon Survey	·	1.9 km	MPC · JPL
576938	2012 XY_{64}	—	December 20, 2007	Kitt Peak	Spacewatch	·	2.6 km	MPC · JPL
576939	2012 XB_{67}	—	December 31, 2007	Mount Lemmon	Mount Lemmon Survey	·	2.2 km	MPC · JPL
576940	2012 XR_{67}	—	June 26, 2011	Mount Lemmon	Mount Lemmon Survey	·	2.3 km	MPC · JPL
576941	2012 XV_{67}	—	December 5, 2012	Nogales	M. Schwartz, P. R. Holvorcem	BRA	1.5 km	MPC · JPL
576942	2012 XP_{69}	—	September 21, 2011	Mount Lemmon	Mount Lemmon Survey	·	2.5 km	MPC · JPL
576943	2012 XF_{70}	—	December 5, 2012	Mount Lemmon	Mount Lemmon Survey	·	1.6 km	MPC · JPL
576944	2012 XJ_{70}	—	September 19, 2006	Kitt Peak	Spacewatch	·	2.8 km	MPC · JPL
576945	2012 XL_{71}	—	November 7, 2012	Mount Lemmon	Mount Lemmon Survey	·	930 m	MPC · JPL
576946	2012 XN_{73}	—	December 6, 2012	Mount Lemmon	Mount Lemmon Survey	·	1.5 km	MPC · JPL
576947	2012 XW_{73}	—	November 23, 2012	Kitt Peak	Spacewatch	MAR	900 m	MPC · JPL
576948	2012 XO_{75}	—	November 20, 2008	Kitt Peak	Spacewatch	·	1.4 km	MPC · JPL
576949	2012 XQ_{76}	—	November 23, 2012	Kitt Peak	Spacewatch	·	1.5 km	MPC · JPL
576950	2012 XB_{81}	—	December 6, 2012	Mount Lemmon	Mount Lemmon Survey	·	1.9 km	MPC · JPL
576951	2012 XJ_{81}	—	December 6, 2012	Mount Lemmon	Mount Lemmon Survey	·	1.7 km	MPC · JPL
576952	2012 XK_{82}	—	November 5, 2012	Kitt Peak	Spacewatch	·	1.6 km	MPC · JPL
576953	2012 XT_{82}	—	September 17, 1998	Kitt Peak	Spacewatch	·	1.8 km	MPC · JPL
576954	2012 XU_{83}	—	February 21, 2002	Palomar	NEAT	·	4.3 km	MPC · JPL
576955	2012 XA_{84}	—	December 6, 2012	Mount Lemmon	Mount Lemmon Survey	·	660 m	MPC · JPL
576956	2012 XE_{85}	—	December 7, 2012	Haleakala	Pan-STARRS 1	EOS	1.5 km	MPC · JPL
576957	2012 XC_{89}	—	November 12, 2012	Mount Lemmon	Mount Lemmon Survey	·	1.6 km	MPC · JPL
576958	2012 XN_{91}	—	November 13, 2012	Mount Graham	Boyle, R. P., V. Laugalys	·	1.7 km	MPC · JPL
576959	2012 XK_{93}	—	November 15, 2012	Mount Lemmon	Mount Lemmon Survey	·	3.2 km	MPC · JPL
576960	2012 XA_{95}	—	December 4, 2012	Mount Lemmon	Mount Lemmon Survey	·	2.1 km	MPC · JPL
576961	2012 XC_{95}	—	December 4, 2012	Mount Lemmon	Mount Lemmon Survey	EOS	1.6 km	MPC · JPL
576962	2012 XF_{95}	—	October 15, 2001	Palomar	NEAT	·	2.1 km	MPC · JPL
576963	2012 XH_{95}	—	November 24, 2012	Kitt Peak	Spacewatch	HYG	2.3 km	MPC · JPL
576964	2012 XU_{97}	—	December 5, 2012	Mount Lemmon	Mount Lemmon Survey	·	1.7 km	MPC · JPL
576965	2012 XY_{97}	—	December 5, 2012	Mount Lemmon	Mount Lemmon Survey	·	1.4 km	MPC · JPL
576966	2012 XG_{98}	—	November 22, 2012	Kitt Peak	Spacewatch	·	2.1 km	MPC · JPL
576967	2012 XK_{101}	—	September 13, 2002	Palomar	NEAT	·	2.6 km	MPC · JPL
576968	2012 XV_{101}	—	September 2, 2011	Haleakala	Pan-STARRS 1	EOS	1.9 km	MPC · JPL
576969	2012 XW_{101}	—	August 24, 2011	Haleakala	Pan-STARRS 1	·	2.4 km	MPC · JPL
576970	2012 XN_{102}	—	December 5, 2012	Mount Lemmon	Mount Lemmon Survey	·	690 m	MPC · JPL
576971	2012 XU_{103}	—	October 22, 2006	Catalina	CSS	·	2.5 km	MPC · JPL
576972	2012 XX_{103}	—	October 7, 2007	Mount Lemmon	Mount Lemmon Survey	NEM	1.8 km	MPC · JPL
576973	2012 XD_{104}	—	December 30, 2008	Mount Lemmon	Mount Lemmon Survey	·	2.0 km	MPC · JPL
576974	2012 XE_{104}	—	December 17, 2007	Kitt Peak	Spacewatch	·	2.4 km	MPC · JPL
576975	2012 XG_{104}	—	June 12, 2011	Mount Lemmon	Mount Lemmon Survey	·	1.6 km	MPC · JPL
576976	2012 XX_{104}	—	October 21, 2012	Haleakala	Pan-STARRS 1	EOS	2.0 km	MPC · JPL
576977	2012 XP_{105}	—	December 7, 2012	Kitt Peak	Spacewatch	·	3.3 km	MPC · JPL
576978	2012 XT_{105}	—	November 12, 2007	Mount Lemmon	Mount Lemmon Survey	·	2.0 km	MPC · JPL
576979	2012 XA_{107}	—	November 26, 2012	Mount Lemmon	Mount Lemmon Survey	H	420 m	MPC · JPL
576980	2012 XN_{107}	—	December 8, 2012	Catalina	CSS	·	710 m	MPC · JPL
576981	2012 XO_{109}	—	December 31, 2007	Mount Lemmon	Mount Lemmon Survey	THM	2.1 km	MPC · JPL
576982	2012 XU_{109}	—	December 8, 2012	Mount Lemmon	Mount Lemmon Survey	·	2.7 km	MPC · JPL
576983	2012 XS_{110}	—	September 21, 2011	Mount Lemmon	Mount Lemmon Survey	EOS	1.6 km	MPC · JPL
576984	2012 XW_{112}	—	December 5, 2012	Mount Lemmon	Mount Lemmon Survey	·	2.3 km	MPC · JPL
576985	2012 XF_{118}	—	September 20, 2011	Haleakala	Pan-STARRS 1	·	2.9 km	MPC · JPL
576986	2012 XH_{118}	—	November 18, 2007	Mount Lemmon	Mount Lemmon Survey	EOS	1.6 km	MPC · JPL
576987	2012 XP_{118}	—	December 8, 2012	Kitt Peak	Spacewatch	·	580 m	MPC · JPL
576988	2012 XX_{118}	—	June 11, 2010	Mount Lemmon	Mount Lemmon Survey	EOS	1.8 km	MPC · JPL
576989	2012 XF_{119}	—	October 9, 2002	Anderson Mesa	LONEOS	·	810 m	MPC · JPL
576990	2012 XL_{121}	—	December 9, 2012	Haleakala	Pan-STARRS 1	EOS	1.3 km	MPC · JPL
576991	2012 XR_{122}	—	January 1, 2008	Kitt Peak	Spacewatch	·	3.2 km	MPC · JPL
576992	2012 XB_{123}	—	September 19, 2006	Kitt Peak	Spacewatch	·	2.3 km	MPC · JPL
576993	2012 XC_{123}	—	November 26, 2012	Mount Lemmon	Mount Lemmon Survey	·	600 m	MPC · JPL
576994	2012 XS_{124}	—	November 19, 2001	Anderson Mesa	LONEOS	·	2.5 km	MPC · JPL
576995	2012 XV_{125}	—	December 20, 2001	Kitt Peak	Spacewatch	ELF	3.1 km	MPC · JPL
576996	2012 XB_{128}	—	June 2, 2003	Kitt Peak	Spacewatch	·	3.2 km	MPC · JPL
576997	2012 XE_{129}	—	October 22, 2003	Kitt Peak	Spacewatch	WIT	880 m	MPC · JPL
576998	2012 XJ_{129}	—	November 6, 2012	Kitt Peak	Spacewatch	TIR	2.2 km	MPC · JPL
576999	2012 XO_{129}	—	December 11, 2012	Mount Lemmon	Mount Lemmon Survey	·	1.9 km	MPC · JPL
577000	2012 XA_{131}	—	December 11, 2012	Mount Lemmon	Mount Lemmon Survey	·	2.6 km	MPC · JPL

back to top

== Meaning of names ==
As minor planet discoveries are confirmed, they are given a permanent number by the IAU's Minor Planet Center (MPC), and the discoverers can then submit names for them, following the IAU's naming conventions. The list below concerns those minor planets in the specified number-range that have received names, and explains the meanings of those names.

Official naming citations of newly named small Solar System bodies are approved and published in a bulletin by IAU's Working Group for Small Bodies Nomenclature (WGSBN). Before May 2021, citations were published in MPC's Minor Planet Circulars for many decades. Recent citations can also be found on the JPL Small-Body Database (SBDB). Until his death in 2016, German astronomer Lutz D. Schmadel compiled these citations into the Dictionary of Minor Planet Names (DMP) and regularly updated the collection.

Based on Paul Herget's The Names of the Minor Planets, Schmadel also researched the unclear origin of numerous asteroids, most of which had been named prior to World War II. This article incorporates text from this source, which is in the public domain: SBDB New namings may only be added to this list below after official publication as the preannouncement of names is condemned. The WGSBN publishes a comprehensive guideline for the naming rules of non-cometary small Solar System bodies.

Named minor planet	Provisional	This minor planet was named for...	Ref · Catalog
576186 Lefebvre	2012 HQ_{38}	Michel Lefebvre, Canadian experimental particle physicist and Professor in the Department of Physics & Astronomy of the University of Victoria.	IAU · 576186
576373 Wolfgangbusch	2012 QX_{2}	Wolfgang Busch (born 1927), a German astronomical optician, who restores historical telescopes. While working as a high school teacher in the 1970s, he developed the "HAB", an oil-spaced triplet-lens apochromat DIY-kit for amateur astronomers (Src). The asteroid's name was proposed by Carolin Liefke.	IAU · 576373
576465 Craigwoodhams	2012 SZ_{56}	Craig Woodhams (b. 1990), a British gymnastics coach.	IAU · 576465
576466 Scherpenisse	2012 SM_{58}	Chiara Scherpenisse (1986–2007), a close friend of the discoverer.	IAU · 576466
576793 Károlyiamy	2012 UN_{185}	Amy Károlyi (1909–2003), a Hungarian poet and literary translator.	IAU · 576793
576853 Rafalreszelewski	2012 VS_{61}	Rafał Reszelewski (born 1996) is a Polish observer of small Solar System bodies, and a discoverer of minor planets and several Kreutz sungrazers comets. He is a member of the "Teide Observatory Tenerife Asteroid Survey" (TOTAS) and proposed the name for asteroid (376574) Michalkusiak (Src).	IAU · 576853
576870 Országlili	2012 VZ_{99}	Lili Ország (1926–1978), a Hungarian surrealist painters.	IAU · 576870
576901 Adagio	2012 WM_{27}	The Association pour le Développement Amateur d'un Grand Instrument d'Observation (ADAGIO) is a non-profit astronomical society which operates the 0.82-m telescope used for the discovery of (576901).	IAU · 576901
