= List of minor planets: 375001–376000 =

The following is a partial list of minor planets, running from minor-planet number 375001 through 376000, inclusive. The primary data for this and other partial lists is based on JPL's "Small-Body Orbital Elements" and data available from the Minor Planet Center. Critical list information is also provided by the MPC, unless otherwise specified from Lowell Observatory. A detailed description of the table's columns and additional sources are given on the main page including a complete list of every page in this series, and a statistical break-up on the dynamical classification of minor planets.

Also see the summary list of all named bodies in numerical and alphabetical order, and the corresponding naming citations for the number range of this particular list. New namings may only be added to this list after official publication, as the preannouncement of names is condemned by the Working Group for Small Bodies Nomenclature of the International Astronomical Union.

Near-Earth obj.	MBA (inner)	MBA (outer)	Centaur
Mars-crosser	MBA (middle)	Jupiter trojan	Trans-Neptunian obj.
Unclassified

== 375001–375100 ==
Designation			Discovery			Properties		Ref
Permanent	Provisional	Named after	Date	Site	Discoverer(s)	Category	Diam.	Ref
375001	2007 FX_{13}	—	March 19, 2007	Mount Lemmon	Mount Lemmon Survey	·	1.5 km	MPC · JPL
375002	2007 FK_{16}	—	February 6, 2007	Kitt Peak	Spacewatch	·	2.3 km	MPC · JPL
375003	2007 FZ_{27}	—	March 20, 2007	Mount Lemmon	Mount Lemmon Survey	·	1.8 km	MPC · JPL
375004	2007 FP_{37}	—	March 26, 2007	Mount Lemmon	Mount Lemmon Survey	HNS	1.2 km	MPC · JPL
375005 Newsome	2007 FM_{42}	Newsome	March 26, 2007	Calvin-Rehoboth	Calvin College	H	480 m	MPC · JPL
375006	2007 GU	—	April 7, 2007	Mount Lemmon	Mount Lemmon Survey	·	2.7 km	MPC · JPL
375007 Buxy	2007 GQ_{5}	Buxy	April 14, 2007	Nogales	J.-C. Merlin	·	2.2 km	MPC · JPL
375008	2007 GO_{9}	—	April 8, 2007	Purple Mountain	PMO NEO Survey Program	·	2.8 km	MPC · JPL
375009	2007 GN_{15}	—	April 11, 2007	Mount Lemmon	Mount Lemmon Survey	·	1.8 km	MPC · JPL
375010	2007 GW_{19}	—	April 11, 2007	Kitt Peak	Spacewatch	·	3.1 km	MPC · JPL
375011	2007 GD_{21}	—	April 11, 2007	Mount Lemmon	Mount Lemmon Survey	HOF	2.8 km	MPC · JPL
375012	2007 GD_{22}	—	April 11, 2007	Mount Lemmon	Mount Lemmon Survey	AST	1.7 km	MPC · JPL
375013	2007 GE_{22}	—	April 11, 2007	Mount Lemmon	Mount Lemmon Survey	·	3.0 km	MPC · JPL
375014	2007 GD_{28}	—	April 15, 2007	Kitt Peak	Spacewatch	·	1.9 km	MPC · JPL
375015	2007 GA_{34}	—	April 13, 2007	Siding Spring	SSS	·	2.0 km	MPC · JPL
375016	2007 GQ_{36}	—	April 14, 2007	Kitt Peak	Spacewatch	·	2.2 km	MPC · JPL
375017	2007 GO_{39}	—	April 14, 2007	Kitt Peak	Spacewatch	WIT	930 m	MPC · JPL
375018	2007 GN_{40}	—	April 14, 2007	Kitt Peak	Spacewatch	·	2.8 km	MPC · JPL
375019	2007 GA_{41}	—	April 14, 2007	Kitt Peak	Spacewatch	·	2.7 km	MPC · JPL
375020	2007 GP_{49}	—	April 15, 2007	Kitt Peak	Spacewatch	·	2.2 km	MPC · JPL
375021	2007 GY_{51}	—	January 9, 2006	Mount Lemmon	Mount Lemmon Survey	·	2.1 km	MPC · JPL
375022	2007 GJ_{56}	—	April 15, 2007	Kitt Peak	Spacewatch	·	1.7 km	MPC · JPL
375023	2007 GJ_{63}	—	April 15, 2007	Kitt Peak	Spacewatch	AGN	1.3 km	MPC · JPL
375024	2007 GE_{66}	—	April 15, 2007	Kitt Peak	Spacewatch	·	2.1 km	MPC · JPL
375025	2007 GR_{72}	—	April 15, 2007	Catalina	CSS	H	620 m	MPC · JPL
375026	2007 GU_{74}	—	April 14, 2007	Mount Lemmon	Mount Lemmon Survey	·	2.9 km	MPC · JPL
375027	2007 GD_{76}	—	April 15, 2007	Kitt Peak	Spacewatch	·	2.4 km	MPC · JPL
375028	2007 GK_{76}	—	April 11, 2007	Kitt Peak	Spacewatch	·	2.3 km	MPC · JPL
375029	2007 HP_{6}	—	March 20, 2007	Mount Lemmon	Mount Lemmon Survey	·	1.7 km	MPC · JPL
375030	2007 HH_{14}	—	April 19, 2007	Mount Lemmon	Mount Lemmon Survey	·	1.6 km	MPC · JPL
375031	2007 HM_{17}	—	April 16, 2007	Anderson Mesa	LONEOS	·	2.7 km	MPC · JPL
375032	2007 HC_{18}	—	April 16, 2007	Catalina	CSS	·	2.6 km	MPC · JPL
375033	2007 HS_{18}	—	April 16, 2007	Catalina	CSS	·	2.1 km	MPC · JPL
375034	2007 HH_{40}	—	April 20, 2007	Mount Lemmon	Mount Lemmon Survey	·	2.1 km	MPC · JPL
375035	2007 HO_{60}	—	April 20, 2007	Socorro	LINEAR	·	1.9 km	MPC · JPL
375036	2007 HW_{61}	—	April 22, 2007	Kitt Peak	Spacewatch	HOF	3.1 km	MPC · JPL
375037	2007 HU_{63}	—	April 22, 2007	Mount Lemmon	Mount Lemmon Survey	·	2.5 km	MPC · JPL
375038	2007 HC_{76}	—	April 22, 2007	Kitt Peak	Spacewatch	·	3.2 km	MPC · JPL
375039	2007 HF_{76}	—	April 22, 2007	Kitt Peak	Spacewatch	·	2.4 km	MPC · JPL
375040	2007 HC_{77}	—	April 23, 2007	Kitt Peak	Spacewatch	·	1.7 km	MPC · JPL
375041	2007 HL_{87}	—	April 24, 2007	Kitt Peak	Spacewatch	·	2.4 km	MPC · JPL
375042	2007 JC_{5}	—	May 8, 2007	Anderson Mesa	LONEOS	H	720 m	MPC · JPL
375043 Zengweizhou	2007 JV_{22}	Zengweizhou	May 11, 2007	Lulin	Q. Ye, Lin, H.-C.	·	2.4 km	MPC · JPL
375044	2007 JZ_{23}	—	May 9, 2007	Mount Lemmon	Mount Lemmon Survey	·	1.8 km	MPC · JPL
375045	2007 JV_{27}	—	May 10, 2007	Kitt Peak	Spacewatch	·	2.3 km	MPC · JPL
375046	2007 JJ_{31}	—	May 12, 2007	Mount Lemmon	Mount Lemmon Survey	EUN	1.2 km	MPC · JPL
375047	2007 JN_{40}	—	May 12, 2007	Kitt Peak	Spacewatch	H	630 m	MPC · JPL
375048	2007 LY_{10}	—	June 9, 2007	Kitt Peak	Spacewatch	·	2.1 km	MPC · JPL
375049	2007 LS_{11}	—	June 9, 2007	Kitt Peak	Spacewatch	AGN	1.2 km	MPC · JPL
375050	2007 LJ_{22}	—	June 13, 2007	Kitt Peak	Spacewatch	BRA	2.1 km	MPC · JPL
375051	2007 LL_{24}	—	June 14, 2007	Kitt Peak	Spacewatch	·	2.7 km	MPC · JPL
375052	2007 LW_{27}	—	June 15, 2007	Kitt Peak	Spacewatch	·	2.2 km	MPC · JPL
375053	2007 NW_{4}	—	July 13, 2007	Reedy Creek	J. Broughton	·	2.2 km	MPC · JPL
375054	2007 PF_{6}	—	August 8, 2007	Socorro	LINEAR	APO · PHA	240 m	MPC · JPL
375055	2007 PB_{10}	—	August 8, 2007	Socorro	LINEAR	·	3.1 km	MPC · JPL
375056	2007 PY_{26}	—	August 7, 2007	Palomar	Palomar	·	2.7 km	MPC · JPL
375057	2007 PS_{29}	—	August 8, 2007	Socorro	LINEAR	·	3.2 km	MPC · JPL
375058	2007 PU_{35}	—	August 11, 2007	Anderson Mesa	LONEOS	·	3.2 km	MPC · JPL
375059	2007 PM_{46}	—	February 16, 1999	Caussols	ODAS	·	4.2 km	MPC · JPL
375060	2007 PA_{49}	—	August 10, 2007	Kitt Peak	Spacewatch	·	5.3 km	MPC · JPL
375061	2007 PM_{50}	—	August 10, 2007	Kitt Peak	Spacewatch	EOS	2.2 km	MPC · JPL
375062	2007 PQ_{50}	—	August 10, 2007	Kitt Peak	Spacewatch	·	3.2 km	MPC · JPL
375063	2007 PV_{50}	—	August 10, 2007	Kitt Peak	Spacewatch	VER	2.9 km	MPC · JPL
375064	2007 QH	—	August 16, 2007	Bisei SG Center	BATTeRS	·	4.2 km	MPC · JPL
375065	2007 QS_{17}	—	August 23, 2007	Kitt Peak	Spacewatch	·	3.8 km	MPC · JPL
375066	2007 RZ_{4}	—	September 1, 2007	Siding Spring	K. Sárneczky, L. Kiss	·	1.6 km	MPC · JPL
375067 Hewins	2007 RJ_{6}	Hewins	September 6, 2007	Vicques	M. Ory	HYG	3.4 km	MPC · JPL
375068	2007 RU_{14}	—	September 11, 2007	Dauban	Chante-Perdrix	·	4.3 km	MPC · JPL
375069	2007 RE_{20}	—	September 12, 2007	Hibiscus	Teamo, N., Pelle, J. C.	·	3.1 km	MPC · JPL
375070	2007 RF_{31}	—	September 5, 2007	Catalina	CSS	LIX	4.6 km	MPC · JPL
375071	2007 RM_{40}	—	September 9, 2007	Kitt Peak	Spacewatch	THM	2.8 km	MPC · JPL
375072	2007 RR_{40}	—	September 9, 2007	Kitt Peak	Spacewatch	·	3.0 km	MPC · JPL
375073	2007 RC_{48}	—	September 9, 2007	Mount Lemmon	Mount Lemmon Survey	·	2.6 km	MPC · JPL
375074	2007 RK_{59}	—	September 10, 2007	Kitt Peak	Spacewatch	·	4.4 km	MPC · JPL
375075	2007 RR_{59}	—	September 10, 2007	Mount Lemmon	Mount Lemmon Survey	·	3.5 km	MPC · JPL
375076	2007 RQ_{60}	—	September 10, 2007	Catalina	CSS	·	4.0 km	MPC · JPL
375077	2007 RW_{60}	—	September 10, 2007	Catalina	CSS	EUP	4.0 km	MPC · JPL
375078	2007 RQ_{61}	—	September 10, 2007	Mount Lemmon	Mount Lemmon Survey	·	3.6 km	MPC · JPL
375079	2007 RD_{69}	—	September 10, 2007	Kitt Peak	Spacewatch	·	4.0 km	MPC · JPL
375080	2007 RD_{73}	—	September 10, 2007	Mount Lemmon	Mount Lemmon Survey	·	3.7 km	MPC · JPL
375081	2007 RY_{82}	—	September 10, 2007	Mount Lemmon	Mount Lemmon Survey	·	4.0 km	MPC · JPL
375082	2007 RP_{111}	—	September 11, 2007	Kitt Peak	Spacewatch	·	4.2 km	MPC · JPL
375083	2007 RQ_{135}	—	September 13, 2007	Kitt Peak	Spacewatch	·	2.8 km	MPC · JPL
375084	2007 RJ_{172}	—	September 10, 2007	Kitt Peak	Spacewatch	·	4.1 km	MPC · JPL
375085	2007 RR_{189}	—	September 10, 2007	Kitt Peak	Spacewatch	MAS	570 m	MPC · JPL
375086	2007 RW_{191}	—	September 11, 2007	Kitt Peak	Spacewatch	THM	2.0 km	MPC · JPL
375087	2007 RC_{208}	—	September 10, 2007	Kitt Peak	Spacewatch	·	3.6 km	MPC · JPL
375088	2007 RR_{212}	—	September 12, 2007	Catalina	CSS	·	4.5 km	MPC · JPL
375089	2007 RA_{219}	—	September 14, 2007	Mount Lemmon	Mount Lemmon Survey	THM	2.6 km	MPC · JPL
375090	2007 RJ_{242}	—	September 15, 2007	Socorro	LINEAR	·	4.4 km	MPC · JPL
375091	2007 RP_{291}	—	September 12, 2007	Mount Lemmon	Mount Lemmon Survey	THM	2.5 km	MPC · JPL
375092	2007 RC_{298}	—	September 8, 2007	Anderson Mesa	LONEOS	·	3.9 km	MPC · JPL
375093	2007 RC_{310}	—	September 4, 2007	Catalina	CSS	·	4.3 km	MPC · JPL
375094	2007 RD_{313}	—	September 4, 2007	Catalina	CSS	TIR	3.2 km	MPC · JPL
375095	2007 RL_{317}	—	September 10, 2007	Mount Lemmon	Mount Lemmon Survey	MAS	560 m	MPC · JPL
375096	2007 RM_{320}	—	September 13, 2007	Mount Lemmon	Mount Lemmon Survey	·	3.0 km	MPC · JPL
375097	2007 RU_{321}	—	September 9, 2007	Kitt Peak	Spacewatch	·	4.4 km	MPC · JPL
375098	2007 SL_{10}	—	September 19, 2007	Kitt Peak	Spacewatch	·	3.1 km	MPC · JPL
375099	2007 TM_{1}	—	October 2, 2007	Siding Spring	SSS	·	2.9 km	MPC · JPL
375100	2007 TU_{9}	—	October 6, 2007	Socorro	LINEAR	·	3.5 km	MPC · JPL

== 375101–375200 ==
back to top

Designation			Discovery			Properties		Ref
Permanent	Provisional	Named after	Date	Site	Discoverer(s)	Category	Diam.	Ref
375101	2007 TB_{44}	—	October 7, 2007	Kitt Peak	Spacewatch	CYB	4.4 km	MPC · JPL
375102	2007 TT_{52}	—	October 4, 2007	Kitt Peak	Spacewatch	·	860 m	MPC · JPL
375103	2007 TD_{71}	—	October 13, 2007	Siding Spring	SSS	APO · PHA	710 m	MPC · JPL
375104	2007 TL_{75}	—	October 4, 2007	Catalina	CSS	·	4.6 km	MPC · JPL
375105	2007 TS_{79}	—	October 6, 2007	7300	W. K. Y. Yeung	CYB	2.7 km	MPC · JPL
375106	2007 TT_{128}	—	October 6, 2007	Kitt Peak	Spacewatch	CYB	4.0 km	MPC · JPL
375107	2007 TN_{130}	—	June 6, 2005	Kitt Peak	Spacewatch	·	4.5 km	MPC · JPL
375108	2007 TE_{144}	—	October 6, 2007	Socorro	LINEAR	·	2.7 km	MPC · JPL
375109	2007 TX_{170}	—	October 12, 2007	Dauban	Chante-Perdrix	VER	3.4 km	MPC · JPL
375110	2007 TX_{219}	—	October 8, 2007	Mount Lemmon	Mount Lemmon Survey	·	3.1 km	MPC · JPL
375111	2007 TG_{255}	—	September 12, 2007	Kitt Peak	Spacewatch	·	3.1 km	MPC · JPL
375112	2007 TD_{280}	—	September 6, 2007	Anderson Mesa	LONEOS	T_{j} (2.98)	3.4 km	MPC · JPL
375113	2007 TF_{284}	—	September 13, 2007	Catalina	CSS	LIX	4.1 km	MPC · JPL
375114	2007 TP_{286}	—	November 4, 1996	Kitt Peak	Spacewatch	·	2.7 km	MPC · JPL
375115	2007 TK_{294}	—	October 10, 2007	Mount Lemmon	Mount Lemmon Survey	·	3.5 km	MPC · JPL
375116	2007 TO_{308}	—	October 9, 2007	Mount Lemmon	Mount Lemmon Survey	URS	3.3 km	MPC · JPL
375117	2007 TW_{339}	—	October 9, 2007	Mount Lemmon	Mount Lemmon Survey	·	3.8 km	MPC · JPL
375118	2007 TW_{410}	—	October 15, 2007	Catalina	CSS	·	3.4 km	MPC · JPL
375119	2007 TS_{440}	—	October 8, 2007	Catalina	CSS	·	3.4 km	MPC · JPL
375120	2007 TU_{446}	—	October 10, 2007	Catalina	CSS	·	3.7 km	MPC · JPL
375121	2007 TB_{451}	—	October 14, 2007	Catalina	CSS	LUT	6.1 km	MPC · JPL
375122	2007 UR_{25}	—	October 16, 2007	Kitt Peak	Spacewatch	·	780 m	MPC · JPL
375123	2007 UX_{77}	—	October 30, 2007	Kitt Peak	Spacewatch	LIX	4.2 km	MPC · JPL
375124	2007 UC_{119}	—	October 30, 2007	Mount Lemmon	Mount Lemmon Survey	THM	2.1 km	MPC · JPL
375125	2007 VH_{127}	—	November 1, 2007	Mount Lemmon	Mount Lemmon Survey	·	4.0 km	MPC · JPL
375126	2007 VY_{184}	—	November 11, 2007	Bisei SG Center	BATTeRS	·	850 m	MPC · JPL
375127	2007 VZ_{184}	—	November 11, 2007	Bisei SG Center	BATTeRS	MAS	670 m	MPC · JPL
375128	2007 VR_{218}	—	May 7, 2006	Mount Lemmon	Mount Lemmon Survey	·	790 m	MPC · JPL
375129	2007 VM_{250}	—	November 15, 2007	Mount Lemmon	Mount Lemmon Survey	·	750 m	MPC · JPL
375130	2007 VH_{266}	—	November 2, 2007	Kitt Peak	Spacewatch	·	760 m	MPC · JPL
375131	2007 VL_{300}	—	November 14, 2007	Anderson Mesa	LONEOS	·	4.2 km	MPC · JPL
375132	2007 WR_{39}	—	November 17, 2007	Catalina	CSS	CYB	5.6 km	MPC · JPL
375133	2007 WS_{49}	—	November 4, 2007	Kitt Peak	Spacewatch	CYB	4.8 km	MPC · JPL
375134	2007 WU_{57}	—	November 20, 2007	Mount Lemmon	Mount Lemmon Survey	·	830 m	MPC · JPL
375135	2007 YF_{54}	—	December 31, 2007	Mount Lemmon	Mount Lemmon Survey	·	680 m	MPC · JPL
375136	2007 YF_{70}	—	December 30, 2007	Kitt Peak	Spacewatch	·	640 m	MPC · JPL
375137	2007 YA_{74}	—	December 31, 2007	Kitt Peak	Spacewatch	·	920 m	MPC · JPL
375138	2008 AK_{11}	—	January 10, 2008	Mount Lemmon	Mount Lemmon Survey	·	1.4 km	MPC · JPL
375139	2008 AF_{31}	—	December 19, 2007	Mount Lemmon	Mount Lemmon Survey	·	800 m	MPC · JPL
375140	2008 AU_{43}	—	January 10, 2008	Kitt Peak	Spacewatch	·	540 m	MPC · JPL
375141	2008 AS_{76}	—	January 12, 2008	Kitt Peak	Spacewatch	·	1.1 km	MPC · JPL
375142	2008 AC_{80}	—	January 12, 2008	Kitt Peak	Spacewatch	·	640 m	MPC · JPL
375143	2008 AL_{118}	—	January 10, 2008	Mount Lemmon	Mount Lemmon Survey	·	1.3 km	MPC · JPL
375144	2008 AO_{134}	—	January 3, 2008	XuYi	PMO NEO Survey Program	·	870 m	MPC · JPL
375145	2008 AK_{137}	—	January 15, 2008	Kitt Peak	Spacewatch	·	790 m	MPC · JPL
375146	2008 BD_{11}	—	November 11, 2007	Mount Lemmon	Mount Lemmon Survey	·	550 m	MPC · JPL
375147	2008 BR_{22}	—	January 31, 2008	Mount Lemmon	Mount Lemmon Survey	·	950 m	MPC · JPL
375148	2008 BQ_{25}	—	January 30, 2008	Mount Lemmon	Mount Lemmon Survey	·	740 m	MPC · JPL
375149	2008 BA_{46}	—	January 30, 2008	Eskridge	G. Hug	·	580 m	MPC · JPL
375150	2008 CD_{11}	—	February 3, 2008	Kitt Peak	Spacewatch	·	810 m	MPC · JPL
375151	2008 CN_{24}	—	February 1, 2008	Kitt Peak	Spacewatch	·	1.4 km	MPC · JPL
375152	2008 CZ_{34}	—	February 2, 2008	Kitt Peak	Spacewatch	·	830 m	MPC · JPL
375153	2008 CS_{39}	—	February 2, 2008	Mount Lemmon	Mount Lemmon Survey	NYS	1.1 km	MPC · JPL
375154	2008 CO_{43}	—	February 2, 2008	Kitt Peak	Spacewatch	·	920 m	MPC · JPL
375155	2008 CR_{87}	—	February 7, 2008	Mount Lemmon	Mount Lemmon Survey	·	680 m	MPC · JPL
375156	2008 CZ_{116}	—	February 11, 2008	Taunus	E. Schwab, R. Kling	V	570 m	MPC · JPL
375157	2008 CA_{132}	—	February 8, 2008	Kitt Peak	Spacewatch	·	820 m	MPC · JPL
375158	2008 CG_{138}	—	February 1, 2008	Kitt Peak	Spacewatch	·	1.1 km	MPC · JPL
375159	2008 CX_{139}	—	February 8, 2008	Catalina	CSS	(883)	840 m	MPC · JPL
375160	2008 CN_{140}	—	February 8, 2008	Kitt Peak	Spacewatch	·	600 m	MPC · JPL
375161	2008 CS_{153}	—	February 9, 2008	Kitt Peak	Spacewatch	·	960 m	MPC · JPL
375162	2008 CM_{159}	—	February 9, 2008	Kitt Peak	Spacewatch	·	650 m	MPC · JPL
375163	2008 CM_{162}	—	February 10, 2008	Kitt Peak	Spacewatch	MAS	790 m	MPC · JPL
375164	2008 CF_{179}	—	February 6, 2008	Catalina	CSS	·	1.1 km	MPC · JPL
375165	2008 CH_{179}	—	February 6, 2008	Catalina	CSS	·	1.3 km	MPC · JPL
375166	2008 CZ_{194}	—	February 13, 2008	Mount Lemmon	Mount Lemmon Survey	·	1.2 km	MPC · JPL
375167	2008 CX_{196}	—	February 8, 2008	Kitt Peak	Spacewatch	MAS	780 m	MPC · JPL
375168	2008 CO_{212}	—	February 8, 2008	Kitt Peak	Spacewatch	MAS	680 m	MPC · JPL
375169	2008 CG_{213}	—	November 18, 2007	Mount Lemmon	Mount Lemmon Survey	·	1.4 km	MPC · JPL
375170	2008 CV_{214}	—	February 12, 2008	Mount Lemmon	Mount Lemmon Survey	·	810 m	MPC · JPL
375171	2008 CG_{215}	—	February 13, 2008	Socorro	LINEAR	PHO	900 m	MPC · JPL
375172	2008 CS_{215}	—	February 13, 2008	Mount Lemmon	Mount Lemmon Survey	·	1.6 km	MPC · JPL
375173	2008 DV_{4}	—	December 5, 2007	Mount Lemmon	Mount Lemmon Survey	·	910 m	MPC · JPL
375174	2008 DD_{9}	—	January 15, 2008	Mount Lemmon	Mount Lemmon Survey	·	1.5 km	MPC · JPL
375175	2008 DA_{17}	—	October 28, 2006	Mount Lemmon	Mount Lemmon Survey	MAS	810 m	MPC · JPL
375176 Béziau	2008 DN_{21}	Béziau	February 28, 2008	Nogales	J.-C. Merlin	·	870 m	MPC · JPL
375177	2008 DN_{23}	—	February 24, 2008	Kitt Peak	Spacewatch	MAS	740 m	MPC · JPL
375178	2008 DR_{27}	—	March 31, 2005	Bergisch Gladbach	W. Bickel	·	720 m	MPC · JPL
375179	2008 DS_{36}	—	February 27, 2008	Mount Lemmon	Mount Lemmon Survey	3:2	5.0 km	MPC · JPL
375180	2008 DB_{38}	—	February 27, 2008	Kitt Peak	Spacewatch	·	1.0 km	MPC · JPL
375181	2008 DS_{53}	—	February 29, 2008	Mount Lemmon	Mount Lemmon Survey	·	850 m	MPC · JPL
375182	2008 DU_{55}	—	February 27, 2008	Kitt Peak	Spacewatch	·	1.3 km	MPC · JPL
375183	2008 DV_{63}	—	February 28, 2008	Mount Lemmon	Mount Lemmon Survey	·	680 m	MPC · JPL
375184	2008 DM_{73}	—	February 27, 2008	Mount Lemmon	Mount Lemmon Survey	·	730 m	MPC · JPL
375185	2008 DO_{75}	—	February 7, 2008	Kitt Peak	Spacewatch	V	760 m	MPC · JPL
375186	2008 DA_{76}	—	February 28, 2008	Mount Lemmon	Mount Lemmon Survey	·	620 m	MPC · JPL
375187	2008 DM_{82}	—	February 28, 2008	Kitt Peak	Spacewatch	·	860 m	MPC · JPL
375188	2008 DT_{82}	—	February 28, 2008	Kitt Peak	Spacewatch	·	650 m	MPC · JPL
375189	2008 DY_{84}	—	February 28, 2008	Kitt Peak	Spacewatch	·	650 m	MPC · JPL
375190	2008 DR_{88}	—	February 26, 2008	Kitt Peak	Spacewatch	·	1.3 km	MPC · JPL
375191	2008 EE_{1}	—	March 3, 2008	Dauban	Kugel, F.	·	1.4 km	MPC · JPL
375192	2008 EF_{14}	—	March 1, 2008	Kitt Peak	Spacewatch	·	1.3 km	MPC · JPL
375193	2008 EW_{22}	—	March 3, 2008	Catalina	CSS	·	790 m	MPC · JPL
375194	2008 EM_{29}	—	March 4, 2008	Mount Lemmon	Mount Lemmon Survey	·	810 m	MPC · JPL
375195	2008 EZ_{31}	—	March 6, 2008	Vail-Jarnac	Jarnac	·	800 m	MPC · JPL
375196	2008 EC_{33}	—	March 1, 2008	Kitt Peak	Spacewatch	·	680 m	MPC · JPL
375197	2008 EJ_{33}	—	March 1, 2008	Kitt Peak	Spacewatch	V	920 m	MPC · JPL
375198	2008 EZ_{38}	—	March 4, 2008	Kitt Peak	Spacewatch	(2076)	760 m	MPC · JPL
375199	2008 EH_{40}	—	March 4, 2008	Kitt Peak	Spacewatch	PHO	1.2 km	MPC · JPL
375200	2008 EC_{70}	—	January 15, 2008	Mount Lemmon	Mount Lemmon Survey	·	710 m	MPC · JPL

== 375201–375300 ==
back to top

Designation			Discovery			Properties		Ref
Permanent	Provisional	Named after	Date	Site	Discoverer(s)	Category	Diam.	Ref
375201	2008 EK_{74}	—	March 7, 2008	Kitt Peak	Spacewatch	·	1.2 km	MPC · JPL
375202	2008 EE_{90}	—	March 13, 2008	Pla D'Arguines	R. Ferrando	·	1.3 km	MPC · JPL
375203	2008 EB_{96}	—	March 6, 2008	Mount Lemmon	Mount Lemmon Survey	·	770 m	MPC · JPL
375204	2008 EO_{98}	—	March 3, 2008	Catalina	CSS	·	980 m	MPC · JPL
375205	2008 EA_{102}	—	March 5, 2008	Mount Lemmon	Mount Lemmon Survey	·	1.3 km	MPC · JPL
375206	2008 EG_{111}	—	March 1, 2008	Kitt Peak	Spacewatch	·	880 m	MPC · JPL
375207	2008 EB_{117}	—	March 8, 2008	Kitt Peak	Spacewatch	·	650 m	MPC · JPL
375208	2008 ED_{121}	—	March 9, 2008	Kitt Peak	Spacewatch	·	870 m	MPC · JPL
375209	2008 EC_{135}	—	March 11, 2008	Kitt Peak	Spacewatch	V	570 m	MPC · JPL
375210	2008 EG_{148}	—	March 1, 2008	Kitt Peak	Spacewatch	·	770 m	MPC · JPL
375211	2008 EQ_{163}	—	March 12, 2008	Kitt Peak	Spacewatch	L5	12 km	MPC · JPL
375212	2008 FA_{3}	—	March 25, 2008	Kitt Peak	Spacewatch	V	790 m	MPC · JPL
375213	2008 FX_{11}	—	March 26, 2008	Mount Lemmon	Mount Lemmon Survey	·	1.1 km	MPC · JPL
375214	2008 FQ_{12}	—	February 8, 2008	Kitt Peak	Spacewatch	·	1.3 km	MPC · JPL
375215	2008 FJ_{15}	—	March 26, 2008	Kitt Peak	Spacewatch	·	1.5 km	MPC · JPL
375216	2008 FR_{26}	—	March 27, 2008	Kitt Peak	Spacewatch	MAS	760 m	MPC · JPL
375217	2008 FS_{26}	—	March 27, 2008	Kitt Peak	Spacewatch	NYS	1.4 km	MPC · JPL
375218	2008 FE_{35}	—	March 28, 2008	Mount Lemmon	Mount Lemmon Survey	·	860 m	MPC · JPL
375219	2008 FX_{42}	—	February 10, 2008	Mount Lemmon	Mount Lemmon Survey	·	660 m	MPC · JPL
375220	2008 FN_{46}	—	March 28, 2008	Mount Lemmon	Mount Lemmon Survey	·	590 m	MPC · JPL
375221	2008 FD_{50}	—	March 28, 2008	Mount Lemmon	Mount Lemmon Survey	·	1.4 km	MPC · JPL
375222	2008 FE_{51}	—	July 27, 1995	Kitt Peak	Spacewatch	KOR	1.2 km	MPC · JPL
375223	2008 FV_{52}	—	March 28, 2008	Mount Lemmon	Mount Lemmon Survey	·	1 km	MPC · JPL
375224	2008 FG_{54}	—	March 28, 2008	Mount Lemmon	Mount Lemmon Survey	·	1.3 km	MPC · JPL
375225	2008 FN_{57}	—	March 28, 2008	Mount Lemmon	Mount Lemmon Survey	·	1.2 km	MPC · JPL
375226	2008 FU_{65}	—	March 28, 2008	Mount Lemmon	Mount Lemmon Survey	·	890 m	MPC · JPL
375227	2008 FP_{68}	—	March 28, 2008	Mount Lemmon	Mount Lemmon Survey	·	1.2 km	MPC · JPL
375228	2008 FK_{77}	—	March 27, 2008	Mount Lemmon	Mount Lemmon Survey	·	750 m	MPC · JPL
375229	2008 FE_{83}	—	March 28, 2008	Kitt Peak	Spacewatch	·	1.6 km	MPC · JPL
375230	2008 FJ_{87}	—	March 28, 2008	Mount Lemmon	Mount Lemmon Survey	·	780 m	MPC · JPL
375231	2008 FZ_{93}	—	March 29, 2008	Kitt Peak	Spacewatch	L5	9.6 km	MPC · JPL
375232	2008 FA_{99}	—	March 30, 2008	Kitt Peak	Spacewatch	·	1.4 km	MPC · JPL
375233	2008 FS_{101}	—	March 30, 2008	Kitt Peak	Spacewatch	·	1.1 km	MPC · JPL
375234	2008 FX_{103}	—	March 30, 2008	Kitt Peak	Spacewatch	·	1.1 km	MPC · JPL
375235	2008 FB_{112}	—	March 31, 2008	Mount Lemmon	Mount Lemmon Survey	·	1.0 km	MPC · JPL
375236	2008 FN_{116}	—	March 31, 2008	Kitt Peak	Spacewatch	·	1.4 km	MPC · JPL
375237	2008 FA_{136}	—	February 25, 1995	Kitt Peak	Spacewatch	L5	9.4 km	MPC · JPL
375238	2008 GW_{1}	—	March 11, 2008	Kitt Peak	Spacewatch	·	1.2 km	MPC · JPL
375239	2008 GX_{8}	—	February 29, 2008	Kitt Peak	Spacewatch	·	690 m	MPC · JPL
375240	2008 GL_{9}	—	April 1, 2008	Kitt Peak	Spacewatch	·	1.3 km	MPC · JPL
375241	2008 GM_{11}	—	April 1, 2008	Kitt Peak	Spacewatch	L5	15 km	MPC · JPL
375242	2008 GP_{28}	—	April 3, 2008	Kitt Peak	Spacewatch	NYS	1.0 km	MPC · JPL
375243	2008 GF_{32}	—	April 3, 2008	Kitt Peak	Spacewatch	·	1.3 km	MPC · JPL
375244	2008 GV_{36}	—	April 3, 2008	Kitt Peak	Spacewatch	L5	11 km	MPC · JPL
375245	2008 GX_{44}	—	April 4, 2008	Kitt Peak	Spacewatch	PHO	1.2 km	MPC · JPL
375246	2008 GH_{51}	—	April 5, 2008	Mount Lemmon	Mount Lemmon Survey	·	900 m	MPC · JPL
375247	2008 GG_{54}	—	April 5, 2008	Kitt Peak	Spacewatch	·	1.6 km	MPC · JPL
375248	2008 GJ_{67}	—	April 6, 2008	Kitt Peak	Spacewatch	V	830 m	MPC · JPL
375249	2008 GO_{67}	—	April 6, 2008	Kitt Peak	Spacewatch	·	1.5 km	MPC · JPL
375250	2008 GQ_{69}	—	April 6, 2008	Mount Lemmon	Mount Lemmon Survey	·	1.5 km	MPC · JPL
375251	2008 GE_{82}	—	April 8, 2008	Kitt Peak	Spacewatch	·	1.8 km	MPC · JPL
375252	2008 GH_{89}	—	April 6, 2008	Kitt Peak	Spacewatch	L5	10 km	MPC · JPL
375253	2008 GO_{91}	—	March 13, 2007	Mount Lemmon	Mount Lemmon Survey	L5	7.5 km	MPC · JPL
375254	2008 GQ_{91}	—	April 6, 2008	Mount Lemmon	Mount Lemmon Survey	·	650 m	MPC · JPL
375255	2008 GU_{91}	—	April 6, 2008	Mount Lemmon	Mount Lemmon Survey	·	1.1 km	MPC · JPL
375256	2008 GL_{94}	—	April 7, 2008	Kitt Peak	Spacewatch	PHO	2.9 km	MPC · JPL
375257	2008 GW_{100}	—	April 9, 2008	Kitt Peak	Spacewatch	L5	12 km	MPC · JPL
375258	2008 GS_{105}	—	December 16, 2006	Kitt Peak	Spacewatch	·	1.7 km	MPC · JPL
375259	2008 GL_{115}	—	April 11, 2008	Kitt Peak	Spacewatch	L5	16 km	MPC · JPL
375260	2008 GC_{116}	—	April 11, 2008	Kitt Peak	Spacewatch	·	1.1 km	MPC · JPL
375261	2008 GN_{117}	—	March 30, 2008	Kitt Peak	Spacewatch	·	1.3 km	MPC · JPL
375262	2008 GT_{130}	—	April 6, 2008	Kitt Peak	Spacewatch	·	1.2 km	MPC · JPL
375263	2008 GC_{131}	—	April 7, 2008	Kitt Peak	Spacewatch	·	1.1 km	MPC · JPL
375264	2008 GR_{139}	—	September 27, 2006	Mount Lemmon	Mount Lemmon Survey	·	1.2 km	MPC · JPL
375265	2008 GJ_{141}	—	April 3, 2008	Mount Lemmon	Mount Lemmon Survey	L5	16 km	MPC · JPL
375266	2008 GV_{141}	—	April 15, 2008	Mount Lemmon	Mount Lemmon Survey	L5	9.9 km	MPC · JPL
375267	2008 GJ_{143}	—	April 6, 2008	Catalina	CSS	PHO	1.2 km	MPC · JPL
375268	2008 HA_{7}	—	April 24, 2008	Mount Lemmon	Mount Lemmon Survey	·	1.2 km	MPC · JPL
375269	2008 HY_{11}	—	April 24, 2008	Kitt Peak	Spacewatch	·	1.1 km	MPC · JPL
375270	2008 HL_{16}	—	April 25, 2008	Kitt Peak	Spacewatch	EUN	2.5 km	MPC · JPL
375271	2008 HC_{22}	—	April 26, 2008	Kitt Peak	Spacewatch	PHO	1.1 km	MPC · JPL
375272	2008 HE_{38}	—	April 30, 2008	Socorro	LINEAR	·	2.3 km	MPC · JPL
375273	2008 HA_{42}	—	March 5, 2008	Mount Lemmon	Mount Lemmon Survey	·	1.2 km	MPC · JPL
375274	2008 HD_{47}	—	April 28, 2008	Mount Lemmon	Mount Lemmon Survey	·	2.2 km	MPC · JPL
375275	2008 HP_{51}	—	April 29, 2008	Kitt Peak	Spacewatch	·	1.6 km	MPC · JPL
375276	2008 HJ_{54}	—	April 29, 2008	Kitt Peak	Spacewatch	·	1.7 km	MPC · JPL
375277	2008 HF_{58}	—	April 30, 2008	Mount Lemmon	Mount Lemmon Survey	V	790 m	MPC · JPL
375278	2008 HM_{61}	—	April 14, 2008	Kitt Peak	Spacewatch	·	1.1 km	MPC · JPL
375279	2008 HT_{67}	—	April 30, 2008	Mount Lemmon	Mount Lemmon Survey	EUN	1.3 km	MPC · JPL
375280	2008 HA_{68}	—	April 16, 2008	Mount Lemmon	Mount Lemmon Survey	·	2.0 km	MPC · JPL
375281	2008 JT_{36}	—	May 5, 2008	Mount Lemmon	Mount Lemmon Survey	·	1.5 km	MPC · JPL
375282	2008 KH_{2}	—	May 27, 2008	Kitt Peak	Spacewatch	·	1.4 km	MPC · JPL
375283	2008 KZ_{12}	—	May 27, 2008	Kitt Peak	Spacewatch	·	1.1 km	MPC · JPL
375284	2008 KJ_{20}	—	May 28, 2008	Kitt Peak	Spacewatch	·	950 m	MPC · JPL
375285	2008 KT_{27}	—	May 30, 2008	Kitt Peak	Spacewatch	·	1.4 km	MPC · JPL
375286	2008 KG_{37}	—	May 29, 2008	Kitt Peak	Spacewatch	EUN	1.3 km	MPC · JPL
375287	2008 KM_{40}	—	May 7, 2008	Mount Lemmon	Mount Lemmon Survey	·	1.6 km	MPC · JPL
375288	2008 LE_{1}	—	June 1, 2008	Mount Lemmon	Mount Lemmon Survey	MAR	730 m	MPC · JPL
375289	2008 LL_{5}	—	May 24, 2004	Socorro	LINEAR	·	1.3 km	MPC · JPL
375290	2008 LB_{13}	—	May 3, 2008	Mount Lemmon	Mount Lemmon Survey	·	2.1 km	MPC · JPL
375291	2008 LR_{13}	—	June 7, 2008	Kitt Peak	Spacewatch	·	1.3 km	MPC · JPL
375292	2008 LH_{16}	—	June 10, 2008	Kitt Peak	Spacewatch	·	2.5 km	MPC · JPL
375293	2008 OL_{1}	—	July 26, 2008	La Sagra	OAM	DOR	3.0 km	MPC · JPL
375294	2008 OU_{3}	—	July 25, 2008	Siding Spring	SSS	MRX	1.3 km	MPC · JPL
375295	2008 OP_{9}	—	July 29, 2008	La Sagra	OAM	·	4.0 km	MPC · JPL
375296	2008 PH_{7}	—	August 5, 2008	La Sagra	OAM	·	2.4 km	MPC · JPL
375297	2008 PQ_{7}	—	August 5, 2008	La Sagra	OAM	·	1.8 km	MPC · JPL
375298	2008 PP_{10}	—	August 7, 2008	La Sagra	OAM	·	2.5 km	MPC · JPL
375299	2008 PZ_{10}	—	October 10, 2004	Socorro	LINEAR	·	2.4 km	MPC · JPL
375300	2008 PN_{16}	—	July 28, 2008	Črni Vrh	Skvarč, J.	·	2.0 km	MPC · JPL

== 375301–375400 ==
back to top

Designation			Discovery			Properties		Ref
Permanent	Provisional	Named after	Date	Site	Discoverer(s)	Category	Diam.	Ref
375301	2008 PS_{16}	—	August 11, 2008	Črni Vrh	Skvarč, J.	·	2.6 km	MPC · JPL
375302	2008 PJ_{21}	—	August 6, 2008	Siding Spring	SSS	·	1.9 km	MPC · JPL
375303 Ikerjiménez	2008 QU_{12}	Ikerjiménez	August 26, 2008	La Sagra	OAM	·	3.0 km	MPC · JPL
375304	2008 QM_{21}	—	July 29, 2008	Mount Lemmon	Mount Lemmon Survey	BRA	1.7 km	MPC · JPL
375305	2008 QR_{21}	—	August 26, 2008	Socorro	LINEAR	·	3.5 km	MPC · JPL
375306	2008 QT_{33}	—	August 27, 2008	La Sagra	OAM	·	3.3 km	MPC · JPL
375307	2008 QT_{39}	—	August 24, 2008	Kitt Peak	Spacewatch	KOR	1.3 km	MPC · JPL
375308	2008 RV_{10}	—	September 3, 2008	Kitt Peak	Spacewatch	·	2.3 km	MPC · JPL
375309	2008 RJ_{17}	—	September 4, 2008	Kitt Peak	Spacewatch	·	2.2 km	MPC · JPL
375310	2008 RR_{18}	—	September 4, 2008	Kitt Peak	Spacewatch	·	2.1 km	MPC · JPL
375311	2008 RM_{26}	—	September 8, 2008	Altschwendt	W. Ries	·	2.8 km	MPC · JPL
375312	2008 RY_{34}	—	September 2, 2008	Kitt Peak	Spacewatch	·	1.9 km	MPC · JPL
375313	2008 RD_{39}	—	September 2, 2008	Kitt Peak	Spacewatch	·	2.1 km	MPC · JPL
375314	2008 RG_{41}	—	September 2, 2008	Kitt Peak	Spacewatch	·	1.5 km	MPC · JPL
375315	2008 RG_{48}	—	September 3, 2008	La Sagra	OAM	·	2.9 km	MPC · JPL
375316	2008 RK_{62}	—	September 4, 2008	Kitt Peak	Spacewatch	·	3.5 km	MPC · JPL
375317	2008 RC_{69}	—	September 4, 2008	Kitt Peak	Spacewatch	·	2.0 km	MPC · JPL
375318	2008 RO_{79}	—	September 2, 2008	La Sagra	OAM	·	2.3 km	MPC · JPL
375319	2008 RK_{82}	—	September 4, 2008	Kitt Peak	Spacewatch	·	2.2 km	MPC · JPL
375320	2008 RW_{83}	—	July 29, 2008	Mount Lemmon	Mount Lemmon Survey	·	2.1 km	MPC · JPL
375321	2008 RV_{87}	—	September 5, 2008	Kitt Peak	Spacewatch	EOS	1.9 km	MPC · JPL
375322	2008 RJ_{98}	—	September 2, 2008	Moletai	Molėtai	EOS	2.0 km	MPC · JPL
375323	2008 RQ_{101}	—	September 2, 2008	Kitt Peak	Spacewatch	·	2.2 km	MPC · JPL
375324	2008 RA_{102}	—	February 25, 2006	Kitt Peak	Spacewatch	·	1.9 km	MPC · JPL
375325	2008 RZ_{102}	—	September 4, 2008	Kitt Peak	Spacewatch	·	3.0 km	MPC · JPL
375326	2008 RY_{107}	—	September 9, 2008	Mount Lemmon	Mount Lemmon Survey	KOR	1.4 km	MPC · JPL
375327	2008 RM_{117}	—	September 9, 2008	Mount Lemmon	Mount Lemmon Survey	·	2.2 km	MPC · JPL
375328	2008 RN_{117}	—	September 9, 2008	Mount Lemmon	Mount Lemmon Survey	·	2.4 km	MPC · JPL
375329	2008 RJ_{130}	—	September 9, 2008	Mount Lemmon	Mount Lemmon Survey	·	2.7 km	MPC · JPL
375330	2008 RZ_{131}	—	September 6, 2008	Catalina	CSS	·	2.9 km	MPC · JPL
375331	2008 RR_{136}	—	September 4, 2008	Kitt Peak	Spacewatch	BRA	1.9 km	MPC · JPL
375332	2008 RD_{142}	—	September 5, 2008	Socorro	LINEAR	·	2.5 km	MPC · JPL
375333	2008 RJ_{143}	—	September 3, 2008	Kitt Peak	Spacewatch	KOR	1.3 km	MPC · JPL
375334	2008 RF_{145}	—	September 6, 2008	Kitt Peak	Spacewatch	KOR	1.3 km	MPC · JPL
375335	2008 SN	—	September 18, 2008	Sandlot	G. Hug	·	2.6 km	MPC · JPL
375336	2008 SV	—	September 21, 2008	Hibiscus	Teamo, N.	·	2.6 km	MPC · JPL
375337	2008 SM_{3}	—	September 22, 2008	Socorro	LINEAR	·	2.7 km	MPC · JPL
375338	2008 SN_{8}	—	September 22, 2008	Socorro	LINEAR	GEF	1.6 km	MPC · JPL
375339	2008 SN_{20}	—	September 2, 2008	Kitt Peak	Spacewatch	EOS	2.1 km	MPC · JPL
375340	2008 SZ_{20}	—	September 9, 2008	Mount Lemmon	Mount Lemmon Survey	·	2.8 km	MPC · JPL
375341	2008 SL_{21}	—	September 19, 2008	Kitt Peak	Spacewatch	·	1.9 km	MPC · JPL
375342	2008 SU_{27}	—	September 19, 2008	Kitt Peak	Spacewatch	KOR	1.5 km	MPC · JPL
375343	2008 SJ_{30}	—	September 7, 2008	Catalina	CSS	·	2.4 km	MPC · JPL
375344	2008 SV_{31}	—	September 20, 2008	Kitt Peak	Spacewatch	DOR	2.7 km	MPC · JPL
375345	2008 SZ_{49}	—	September 20, 2008	Mount Lemmon	Mount Lemmon Survey	·	1.2 km	MPC · JPL
375346	2008 SA_{50}	—	September 20, 2008	Mount Lemmon	Mount Lemmon Survey	HOF	2.4 km	MPC · JPL
375347	2008 SU_{50}	—	September 20, 2008	Mount Lemmon	Mount Lemmon Survey	KOR	1.5 km	MPC · JPL
375348	2008 SX_{51}	—	September 20, 2008	Mount Lemmon	Mount Lemmon Survey	·	2.0 km	MPC · JPL
375349	2008 SE_{52}	—	September 20, 2008	Mount Lemmon	Mount Lemmon Survey	·	1.8 km	MPC · JPL
375350	2008 SE_{58}	—	September 20, 2008	Kitt Peak	Spacewatch	·	2.2 km	MPC · JPL
375351	2008 SL_{58}	—	September 20, 2008	Kitt Peak	Spacewatch	·	1.9 km	MPC · JPL
375352	2008 SS_{58}	—	September 20, 2008	Kitt Peak	Spacewatch	·	3.5 km	MPC · JPL
375353	2008 SP_{60}	—	September 20, 2008	Catalina	CSS	AGN	1.5 km	MPC · JPL
375354	2008 SX_{76}	—	September 23, 2008	Mount Lemmon	Mount Lemmon Survey	DOR	2.8 km	MPC · JPL
375355	2008 SR_{80}	—	September 23, 2008	Mount Lemmon	Mount Lemmon Survey	·	3.0 km	MPC · JPL
375356	2008 SL_{88}	—	September 20, 2008	Mount Lemmon	Mount Lemmon Survey	KOR	1.2 km	MPC · JPL
375357	2008 SB_{95}	—	September 21, 2008	Kitt Peak	Spacewatch	·	3.8 km	MPC · JPL
375358	2008 SU_{101}	—	September 21, 2008	Mount Lemmon	Mount Lemmon Survey	·	2.1 km	MPC · JPL
375359	2008 SX_{102}	—	September 21, 2008	Kitt Peak	Spacewatch	·	2.2 km	MPC · JPL
375360	2008 SA_{106}	—	September 21, 2008	Kitt Peak	Spacewatch	·	2.6 km	MPC · JPL
375361	2008 SN_{116}	—	September 22, 2008	Kitt Peak	Spacewatch	·	2.4 km	MPC · JPL
375362	2008 SW_{119}	—	September 22, 2008	Mount Lemmon	Mount Lemmon Survey	·	1.7 km	MPC · JPL
375363	2008 SG_{120}	—	September 22, 2008	Mount Lemmon	Mount Lemmon Survey	·	3.0 km	MPC · JPL
375364	2008 SR_{121}	—	September 22, 2008	Mount Lemmon	Mount Lemmon Survey	·	1.5 km	MPC · JPL
375365	2008 SB_{124}	—	September 22, 2008	Mount Lemmon	Mount Lemmon Survey	·	2.9 km	MPC · JPL
375366	2008 SU_{124}	—	September 22, 2008	Mount Lemmon	Mount Lemmon Survey	·	2.0 km	MPC · JPL
375367	2008 SY_{128}	—	September 22, 2008	Kitt Peak	Spacewatch	·	3.0 km	MPC · JPL
375368	2008 SZ_{128}	—	September 22, 2008	Kitt Peak	Spacewatch	EOS	1.6 km	MPC · JPL
375369	2008 SS_{130}	—	September 22, 2008	Kitt Peak	Spacewatch	ANF	1.6 km	MPC · JPL
375370	2008 SS_{132}	—	September 22, 2008	Kitt Peak	Spacewatch	EOS	2.0 km	MPC · JPL
375371	2008 SD_{133}	—	September 22, 2008	Kitt Peak	Spacewatch	KOR	1.6 km	MPC · JPL
375372	2008 SF_{136}	—	September 23, 2008	Kitt Peak	Spacewatch	EOS	1.6 km	MPC · JPL
375373	2008 SN_{140}	—	September 24, 2008	Mount Lemmon	Mount Lemmon Survey	·	2.9 km	MPC · JPL
375374	2008 SS_{146}	—	September 23, 2008	Kitt Peak	Spacewatch	EOS	1.8 km	MPC · JPL
375375	2008 SR_{147}	—	September 25, 2008	Goodricke-Pigott	R. A. Tucker	·	1.6 km	MPC · JPL
375376	2008 SF_{149}	—	September 23, 2008	Kitt Peak	Spacewatch	EOS	2.1 km	MPC · JPL
375377	2008 SR_{149}	—	September 28, 2008	Dauban	Kugel, F.	·	3.6 km	MPC · JPL
375378	2008 SX_{153}	—	August 23, 2008	Kitt Peak	Spacewatch	AGN	1.7 km	MPC · JPL
375379	2008 SP_{163}	—	September 3, 2008	Kitt Peak	Spacewatch	·	2.6 km	MPC · JPL
375380	2008 SJ_{168}	—	September 30, 2008	Socorro	LINEAR	·	2.1 km	MPC · JPL
375381	2008 SN_{180}	—	September 24, 2008	Kitt Peak	Spacewatch	·	1.4 km	MPC · JPL
375382	2008 SU_{183}	—	September 24, 2008	Kitt Peak	Spacewatch	·	3.7 km	MPC · JPL
375383	2008 SY_{197}	—	September 25, 2008	Kitt Peak	Spacewatch	·	4.1 km	MPC · JPL
375384	2008 SE_{198}	—	September 25, 2008	Kitt Peak	Spacewatch	·	1.7 km	MPC · JPL
375385	2008 SO_{198}	—	September 25, 2008	Kitt Peak	Spacewatch	·	5.0 km	MPC · JPL
375386	2008 SJ_{200}	—	September 26, 2008	Kitt Peak	Spacewatch	·	1.8 km	MPC · JPL
375387	2008 SW_{201}	—	September 26, 2008	Kitt Peak	Spacewatch	EOS	1.9 km	MPC · JPL
375388	2008 SB_{204}	—	September 26, 2008	Kitt Peak	Spacewatch	VER	2.7 km	MPC · JPL
375389	2008 SP_{219}	—	September 30, 2008	La Sagra	OAM	HOF	3.4 km	MPC · JPL
375390	2008 SU_{220}	—	September 25, 2008	Kitt Peak	Spacewatch	KOR	1.2 km	MPC · JPL
375391	2008 SK_{224}	—	September 26, 2008	Kitt Peak	Spacewatch	BRA	1.6 km	MPC · JPL
375392	2008 SP_{224}	—	September 26, 2008	Kitt Peak	Spacewatch	·	5.1 km	MPC · JPL
375393	2008 SX_{236}	—	October 21, 2003	Kitt Peak	Spacewatch	EOS	1.7 km	MPC · JPL
375394	2008 SJ_{238}	—	September 29, 2008	Kitt Peak	Spacewatch	EOS	2.0 km	MPC · JPL
375395	2008 SC_{240}	—	September 21, 2008	Kitt Peak	Spacewatch	·	2.4 km	MPC · JPL
375396	2008 SN_{242}	—	September 29, 2008	Kitt Peak	Spacewatch	THM	1.9 km	MPC · JPL
375397	2008 SO_{242}	—	September 29, 2008	Kitt Peak	Spacewatch	·	2.9 km	MPC · JPL
375398	2008 ST_{249}	—	September 23, 2008	Kitt Peak	Spacewatch	·	2.5 km	MPC · JPL
375399	2008 SS_{250}	—	September 24, 2008	Catalina	CSS	TEL	1.8 km	MPC · JPL
375400	2008 SU_{250}	—	September 24, 2008	Kitt Peak	Spacewatch	KOR	1.4 km	MPC · JPL

== 375401–375500 ==
back to top

Designation			Discovery			Properties		Ref
Permanent	Provisional	Named after	Date	Site	Discoverer(s)	Category	Diam.	Ref
375401	2008 SX_{252}	—	September 21, 2008	Kitt Peak	Spacewatch	·	3.8 km	MPC · JPL
375402	2008 SQ_{254}	—	September 22, 2008	Catalina	CSS	·	2.3 km	MPC · JPL
375403	2008 SM_{255}	—	September 24, 2008	Kitt Peak	Spacewatch	·	2.6 km	MPC · JPL
375404	2008 SO_{258}	—	September 22, 2008	Mount Lemmon	Mount Lemmon Survey	·	3.3 km	MPC · JPL
375405	2008 ST_{262}	—	September 24, 2008	Kitt Peak	Spacewatch	KOR	1.3 km	MPC · JPL
375406	2008 SO_{265}	—	September 28, 2008	Mount Lemmon	Mount Lemmon Survey	·	3.0 km	MPC · JPL
375407	2008 SW_{265}	—	September 29, 2008	Kitt Peak	Spacewatch	·	1.6 km	MPC · JPL
375408	2008 SL_{268}	—	September 26, 2008	Kitt Peak	Spacewatch	·	2.0 km	MPC · JPL
375409	2008 SK_{269}	—	September 21, 2008	Catalina	CSS	slow	3.3 km	MPC · JPL
375410	2008 SA_{274}	—	September 24, 2008	Mount Lemmon	Mount Lemmon Survey	·	1.9 km	MPC · JPL
375411	2008 SP_{282}	—	September 22, 2008	Kitt Peak	Spacewatch	TIR	3.6 km	MPC · JPL
375412	2008 SM_{283}	—	September 22, 2008	Mount Lemmon	Mount Lemmon Survey	·	2.3 km	MPC · JPL
375413	2008 ST_{283}	—	September 23, 2008	Kitt Peak	Spacewatch	·	2.0 km	MPC · JPL
375414	2008 SR_{285}	—	September 21, 2008	Kitt Peak	Spacewatch	·	1.9 km	MPC · JPL
375415	2008 SZ_{286}	—	September 23, 2008	Catalina	CSS	·	4.2 km	MPC · JPL
375416	2008 SF_{293}	—	September 29, 2008	Catalina	CSS	·	1.9 km	MPC · JPL
375417	2008 SJ_{297}	—	September 29, 2008	Catalina	CSS	·	2.3 km	MPC · JPL
375418	2008 SJ_{298}	—	September 21, 2008	Kitt Peak	Spacewatch	EOS	2.4 km	MPC · JPL
375419	2008 SE_{302}	—	September 23, 2008	Kitt Peak	Spacewatch	·	3.6 km	MPC · JPL
375420	2008 SD_{306}	—	September 28, 2008	Mount Lemmon	Mount Lemmon Survey	·	2.8 km	MPC · JPL
375421	2008 SM_{307}	—	September 29, 2008	Catalina	CSS	TIN	1.4 km	MPC · JPL
375422	2008 SV_{307}	—	September 29, 2008	Catalina	CSS	EOS	2.1 km	MPC · JPL
375423	2008 SP_{308}	—	September 30, 2008	Catalina	CSS	·	2.6 km	MPC · JPL
375424	2008 SZ_{309}	—	September 22, 2008	Mount Lemmon	Mount Lemmon Survey	·	4.4 km	MPC · JPL
375425	2008 TT_{6}	—	October 3, 2008	La Sagra	OAM	·	1.7 km	MPC · JPL
375426	2008 TF_{10}	—	March 8, 2005	Mount Lemmon	Mount Lemmon Survey	·	2.7 km	MPC · JPL
375427	2008 TJ_{12}	—	October 1, 2008	Mount Lemmon	Mount Lemmon Survey	·	1.9 km	MPC · JPL
375428	2008 TM_{27}	—	October 1, 2008	La Sagra	OAM	·	2.5 km	MPC · JPL
375429	2008 TN_{30}	—	October 1, 2008	Kitt Peak	Spacewatch	·	2.2 km	MPC · JPL
375430	2008 TA_{33}	—	October 1, 2008	Kitt Peak	Spacewatch	KOR	1.3 km	MPC · JPL
375431	2008 TK_{38}	—	October 1, 2008	Catalina	CSS	·	2.8 km	MPC · JPL
375432	2008 TY_{51}	—	October 2, 2008	Kitt Peak	Spacewatch	·	1.7 km	MPC · JPL
375433	2008 TZ_{51}	—	October 2, 2008	Kitt Peak	Spacewatch	EOS	2.2 km	MPC · JPL
375434	2008 TZ_{52}	—	October 2, 2008	Kitt Peak	Spacewatch	KOR	1.4 km	MPC · JPL
375435	2008 TK_{56}	—	October 2, 2008	Kitt Peak	Spacewatch	EOS	1.7 km	MPC · JPL
375436	2008 TW_{58}	—	October 2, 2008	Kitt Peak	Spacewatch	·	2.6 km	MPC · JPL
375437	2008 TQ_{70}	—	October 2, 2008	Kitt Peak	Spacewatch	(43176)	2.9 km	MPC · JPL
375438	2008 TO_{74}	—	October 2, 2008	Kitt Peak	Spacewatch	·	2.0 km	MPC · JPL
375439	2008 TK_{77}	—	September 2, 2008	Kitt Peak	Spacewatch	KOR	1.5 km	MPC · JPL
375440	2008 TL_{77}	—	October 2, 2008	Mount Lemmon	Mount Lemmon Survey	·	3.1 km	MPC · JPL
375441	2008 TG_{78}	—	October 2, 2008	Mount Lemmon	Mount Lemmon Survey	·	1.8 km	MPC · JPL
375442	2008 TT_{79}	—	September 6, 2008	Mount Lemmon	Mount Lemmon Survey	·	3.0 km	MPC · JPL
375443	2008 TM_{84}	—	October 3, 2008	Kitt Peak	Spacewatch	KOR	1.5 km	MPC · JPL
375444	2008 TN_{86}	—	October 3, 2008	Mount Lemmon	Mount Lemmon Survey	·	1.2 km	MPC · JPL
375445	2008 TQ_{87}	—	September 25, 2008	Kitt Peak	Spacewatch	·	1.9 km	MPC · JPL
375446	2008 TZ_{87}	—	October 3, 2008	Kitt Peak	Spacewatch	EOS	1.9 km	MPC · JPL
375447	2008 TA_{90}	—	September 25, 2008	Kitt Peak	Spacewatch	VER	2.5 km	MPC · JPL
375448	2008 TS_{90}	—	October 3, 2008	Kitt Peak	Spacewatch	KOR	1.6 km	MPC · JPL
375449	2008 TL_{92}	—	October 4, 2008	La Sagra	OAM	KOR	1.2 km	MPC · JPL
375450	2008 TA_{94}	—	October 5, 2008	La Sagra	OAM	KOR	1.5 km	MPC · JPL
375451	2008 TV_{95}	—	October 6, 2008	Kitt Peak	Spacewatch	(43176)	2.9 km	MPC · JPL
375452	2008 TO_{96}	—	October 6, 2008	Kitt Peak	Spacewatch	EOS	2.1 km	MPC · JPL
375453	2008 TO_{100}	—	October 6, 2008	Kitt Peak	Spacewatch	·	2.0 km	MPC · JPL
375454	2008 TY_{102}	—	October 6, 2008	Kitt Peak	Spacewatch	·	2.0 km	MPC · JPL
375455	2008 TC_{106}	—	October 6, 2008	Mount Lemmon	Mount Lemmon Survey	·	1.8 km	MPC · JPL
375456	2008 TZ_{108}	—	October 6, 2008	Mount Lemmon	Mount Lemmon Survey	·	2.5 km	MPC · JPL
375457	2008 TC_{122}	—	October 7, 2008	Catalina	CSS	H	510 m	MPC · JPL
375458	2008 TT_{124}	—	October 8, 2008	Mount Lemmon	Mount Lemmon Survey	·	2.0 km	MPC · JPL
375459	2008 TA_{125}	—	October 8, 2008	Mount Lemmon	Mount Lemmon Survey	·	2.2 km	MPC · JPL
375460	2008 TS_{128}	—	October 8, 2008	Catalina	CSS	·	1.5 km	MPC · JPL
375461	2008 TG_{148}	—	October 9, 2008	Mount Lemmon	Mount Lemmon Survey	·	1.9 km	MPC · JPL
375462	2008 TQ_{151}	—	October 9, 2008	Mount Lemmon	Mount Lemmon Survey	·	2.1 km	MPC · JPL
375463	2008 TD_{153}	—	October 9, 2008	Mount Lemmon	Mount Lemmon Survey	EOS	2.2 km	MPC · JPL
375464	2008 TF_{164}	—	October 1, 2008	Mount Lemmon	Mount Lemmon Survey	EOS	2.3 km	MPC · JPL
375465	2008 TN_{165}	—	October 2, 2008	Mount Lemmon	Mount Lemmon Survey	·	2.8 km	MPC · JPL
375466	2008 TA_{166}	—	October 6, 2008	Catalina	CSS	·	4.6 km	MPC · JPL
375467	2008 TM_{169}	—	October 7, 2008	Kitt Peak	Spacewatch	·	2.8 km	MPC · JPL
375468	2008 TZ_{171}	—	October 8, 2008	Kitt Peak	Spacewatch	EOS	2.1 km	MPC · JPL
375469	2008 TZ_{177}	—	October 1, 2008	Catalina	CSS	·	3.9 km	MPC · JPL
375470	2008 TZ_{183}	—	October 3, 2008	Socorro	LINEAR	·	3.8 km	MPC · JPL
375471	2008 TD_{186}	—	October 7, 2008	Mount Lemmon	Mount Lemmon Survey	·	2.8 km	MPC · JPL
375472	2008 TB_{188}	—	October 9, 2008	Kitt Peak	Spacewatch	TEL	1.2 km	MPC · JPL
375473	2008 UH_{1}	—	October 21, 2008	Great Shefford	Birtwhistle, P.	EOS	2.2 km	MPC · JPL
375474	2008 US_{7}	—	October 17, 2008	Kitt Peak	Spacewatch	KOR	1.4 km	MPC · JPL
375475	2008 UB_{12}	—	October 17, 2008	Kitt Peak	Spacewatch	KOR	1.7 km	MPC · JPL
375476	2008 UT_{17}	—	October 18, 2008	Kitt Peak	Spacewatch	·	4.4 km	MPC · JPL
375477	2008 UU_{19}	—	September 20, 2008	Kitt Peak	Spacewatch	·	3.0 km	MPC · JPL
375478	2008 UQ_{21}	—	October 19, 2008	Kitt Peak	Spacewatch	·	3.6 km	MPC · JPL
375479	2008 UB_{25}	—	October 20, 2008	Mount Lemmon	Mount Lemmon Survey	·	1.8 km	MPC · JPL
375480	2008 UE_{29}	—	October 20, 2008	Kitt Peak	Spacewatch	·	3.0 km	MPC · JPL
375481	2008 UL_{30}	—	October 20, 2008	Kitt Peak	Spacewatch	·	3.6 km	MPC · JPL
375482	2008 UY_{31}	—	October 20, 2008	Kitt Peak	Spacewatch	·	2.3 km	MPC · JPL
375483	2008 UE_{32}	—	September 26, 2008	Kitt Peak	Spacewatch	·	3.1 km	MPC · JPL
375484	2008 UD_{33}	—	October 20, 2008	Kitt Peak	Spacewatch	·	2.3 km	MPC · JPL
375485	2008 UA_{38}	—	December 25, 2003	Kitt Peak	Spacewatch	·	3.1 km	MPC · JPL
375486	2008 UW_{40}	—	October 20, 2008	Kitt Peak	Spacewatch	·	2.0 km	MPC · JPL
375487	2008 UM_{42}	—	October 20, 2008	Kitt Peak	Spacewatch	·	2.5 km	MPC · JPL
375488	2008 UC_{46}	—	October 20, 2008	Kitt Peak	Spacewatch	·	2.8 km	MPC · JPL
375489	2008 UK_{46}	—	October 20, 2008	Kitt Peak	Spacewatch	EOS	2.5 km	MPC · JPL
375490	2008 UR_{47}	—	October 20, 2008	Kitt Peak	Spacewatch	EOS	2.4 km	MPC · JPL
375491	2008 UB_{52}	—	October 20, 2008	Mount Lemmon	Mount Lemmon Survey	H	620 m	MPC · JPL
375492	2008 UV_{53}	—	October 20, 2008	Kitt Peak	Spacewatch	EOS	2.3 km	MPC · JPL
375493	2008 UC_{58}	—	October 21, 2008	Kitt Peak	Spacewatch	·	2.3 km	MPC · JPL
375494	2008 UH_{59}	—	October 21, 2008	Mount Lemmon	Mount Lemmon Survey	·	1.8 km	MPC · JPL
375495	2008 UL_{60}	—	October 21, 2008	Kitt Peak	Spacewatch	·	3.4 km	MPC · JPL
375496	2008 UL_{63}	—	October 21, 2008	Kitt Peak	Spacewatch	·	3.9 km	MPC · JPL
375497	2008 UO_{71}	—	October 21, 2008	Mount Lemmon	Mount Lemmon Survey	·	4.7 km	MPC · JPL
375498	2008 UR_{71}	—	October 21, 2008	Mount Lemmon	Mount Lemmon Survey	·	4.0 km	MPC · JPL
375499	2008 UL_{74}	—	October 21, 2008	Kitt Peak	Spacewatch	·	3.7 km	MPC · JPL
375500	2008 UW_{74}	—	October 21, 2008	Kitt Peak	Spacewatch	·	2.9 km	MPC · JPL

== 375501–375600 ==
back to top

Designation			Discovery			Properties		Ref
Permanent	Provisional	Named after	Date	Site	Discoverer(s)	Category	Diam.	Ref
375501	2008 UP_{76}	—	October 21, 2008	Kitt Peak	Spacewatch	·	2.4 km	MPC · JPL
375502	2008 UJ_{77}	—	October 21, 2008	Kitt Peak	Spacewatch	LIX	4.0 km	MPC · JPL
375503	2008 UX_{77}	—	October 21, 2008	Kitt Peak	Spacewatch	EUP	7.5 km	MPC · JPL
375504	2008 UJ_{86}	—	October 23, 2008	Kitt Peak	Spacewatch	·	2.8 km	MPC · JPL
375505	2008 UN_{90}	—	October 27, 2008	Catalina	CSS	AMO	320 m	MPC · JPL
375506	2008 UC_{99}	—	October 29, 2008	Socorro	LINEAR	·	4.7 km	MPC · JPL
375507	2008 UH_{101}	—	October 20, 2008	Kitt Peak	Spacewatch	·	1.9 km	MPC · JPL
375508	2008 UL_{105}	—	October 20, 2008	Mount Lemmon	Mount Lemmon Survey	·	2.2 km	MPC · JPL
375509	2008 UZ_{110}	—	October 22, 2008	Kitt Peak	Spacewatch	·	4.1 km	MPC · JPL
375510	2008 UF_{111}	—	October 22, 2008	Kitt Peak	Spacewatch	·	4.0 km	MPC · JPL
375511	2008 UO_{111}	—	October 22, 2008	Kitt Peak	Spacewatch	(1298)	3.2 km	MPC · JPL
375512	2008 UJ_{112}	—	October 22, 2008	Kitt Peak	Spacewatch	EOS	3.9 km	MPC · JPL
375513	2008 UX_{112}	—	October 9, 2008	Kitt Peak	Spacewatch	·	3.4 km	MPC · JPL
375514	2008 UA_{117}	—	October 22, 2008	Kitt Peak	Spacewatch	·	2.3 km	MPC · JPL
375515	2008 UE_{122}	—	October 22, 2008	Kitt Peak	Spacewatch	·	4.3 km	MPC · JPL
375516	2008 UG_{125}	—	October 22, 2008	Kitt Peak	Spacewatch	·	3.3 km	MPC · JPL
375517	2008 UX_{125}	—	October 22, 2008	Kitt Peak	Spacewatch	·	4.9 km	MPC · JPL
375518	2008 US_{129}	—	October 10, 2008	Mount Lemmon	Mount Lemmon Survey	·	3.2 km	MPC · JPL
375519	2008 UT_{133}	—	October 23, 2008	Kitt Peak	Spacewatch	·	2.2 km	MPC · JPL
375520	2008 UC_{140}	—	October 23, 2008	Kitt Peak	Spacewatch	·	3.2 km	MPC · JPL
375521	2008 UQ_{140}	—	October 23, 2008	Kitt Peak	Spacewatch	·	3.9 km	MPC · JPL
375522	2008 US_{142}	—	October 23, 2008	Kitt Peak	Spacewatch	·	2.8 km	MPC · JPL
375523	2008 UU_{145}	—	October 23, 2008	Kitt Peak	Spacewatch	·	3.6 km	MPC · JPL
375524	2008 UJ_{150}	—	October 23, 2008	Mount Lemmon	Mount Lemmon Survey	EOS	2.1 km	MPC · JPL
375525	2008 UV_{153}	—	October 23, 2008	Mount Lemmon	Mount Lemmon Survey	EOS	1.6 km	MPC · JPL
375526	2008 UD_{159}	—	October 23, 2008	Kitt Peak	Spacewatch	·	1.8 km	MPC · JPL
375527	2008 UR_{159}	—	October 23, 2008	Kitt Peak	Spacewatch	·	3.5 km	MPC · JPL
375528	2008 UU_{168}	—	October 24, 2008	Kitt Peak	Spacewatch	EOS	2.0 km	MPC · JPL
375529	2008 US_{169}	—	October 24, 2008	Kitt Peak	Spacewatch	(8737)	3.0 km	MPC · JPL
375530	2008 UV_{175}	—	October 24, 2008	Mount Lemmon	Mount Lemmon Survey	·	3.4 km	MPC · JPL
375531	2008 UV_{182}	—	October 24, 2008	Mount Lemmon	Mount Lemmon Survey	·	5.0 km	MPC · JPL
375532	2008 UJ_{184}	—	October 24, 2008	Kitt Peak	Spacewatch	·	2.8 km	MPC · JPL
375533	2008 UZ_{184}	—	October 24, 2008	Kitt Peak	Spacewatch	·	3.4 km	MPC · JPL
375534	2008 UY_{185}	—	October 24, 2008	Kitt Peak	Spacewatch	·	2.4 km	MPC · JPL
375535	2008 UX_{186}	—	October 24, 2008	Kitt Peak	Spacewatch	H	600 m	MPC · JPL
375536	2008 UN_{188}	—	October 24, 2008	Kitt Peak	Spacewatch	(159)	2.8 km	MPC · JPL
375537	2008 UJ_{193}	—	October 25, 2008	Mount Lemmon	Mount Lemmon Survey	·	4.4 km	MPC · JPL
375538	2008 UB_{201}	—	October 28, 2008	Socorro	LINEAR	·	3.5 km	MPC · JPL
375539	2008 UK_{201}	—	October 28, 2008	Socorro	LINEAR	·	3.0 km	MPC · JPL
375540	2008 US_{206}	—	October 22, 2008	Siding Spring	SSS	·	3.6 km	MPC · JPL
375541	2008 UC_{214}	—	October 24, 2008	Catalina	CSS	·	2.5 km	MPC · JPL
375542	2008 UG_{214}	—	October 24, 2008	Catalina	CSS	·	2.2 km	MPC · JPL
375543	2008 UL_{216}	—	October 24, 2008	Kitt Peak	Spacewatch	·	2.4 km	MPC · JPL
375544	2008 UX_{219}	—	October 25, 2008	Kitt Peak	Spacewatch	·	5.1 km	MPC · JPL
375545	2008 UN_{232}	—	October 26, 2008	Kitt Peak	Spacewatch	·	1.5 km	MPC · JPL
375546	2008 UL_{251}	—	October 27, 2008	Kitt Peak	Spacewatch	THM	2.1 km	MPC · JPL
375547	2008 UO_{251}	—	October 27, 2008	Kitt Peak	Spacewatch	THM	2.6 km	MPC · JPL
375548	2008 UQ_{257}	—	October 27, 2008	Kitt Peak	Spacewatch	EOS	2.1 km	MPC · JPL
375549	2008 US_{268}	—	October 28, 2008	Kitt Peak	Spacewatch	·	4.4 km	MPC · JPL
375550	2008 UA_{270}	—	October 20, 2008	Kitt Peak	Spacewatch	·	4.0 km	MPC · JPL
375551	2008 UG_{271}	—	October 28, 2008	Kitt Peak	Spacewatch	·	3.7 km	MPC · JPL
375552	2008 UQ_{283}	—	October 28, 2008	Mount Lemmon	Mount Lemmon Survey	·	4.3 km	MPC · JPL
375553	2008 UL_{293}	—	October 29, 2008	Kitt Peak	Spacewatch	·	3.0 km	MPC · JPL
375554	2008 UC_{297}	—	September 30, 2003	Kitt Peak	Spacewatch	·	2.2 km	MPC · JPL
375555	2008 UW_{303}	—	October 8, 2008	Mount Lemmon	Mount Lemmon Survey	EOS	2.4 km	MPC · JPL
375556	2008 UQ_{309}	—	October 30, 2008	Catalina	CSS	EUP	4.3 km	MPC · JPL
375557	2008 UD_{311}	—	September 23, 2008	Catalina	CSS	INA	3.4 km	MPC · JPL
375558	2008 UV_{312}	—	October 30, 2008	Kitt Peak	Spacewatch	EOS	2.5 km	MPC · JPL
375559	2008 UB_{313}	—	October 30, 2008	Kitt Peak	Spacewatch	·	2.3 km	MPC · JPL
375560	2008 UD_{313}	—	October 17, 2003	Kitt Peak	Spacewatch	·	2.8 km	MPC · JPL
375561	2008 UE_{316}	—	October 30, 2008	Kitt Peak	Spacewatch	THM	2.2 km	MPC · JPL
375562	2008 UV_{321}	—	September 23, 2008	Kitt Peak	Spacewatch	HYG	2.4 km	MPC · JPL
375563	2008 UM_{322}	—	October 31, 2008	Mount Lemmon	Mount Lemmon Survey	·	2.3 km	MPC · JPL
375564	2008 UL_{323}	—	October 31, 2008	Catalina	CSS	EOS	2.2 km	MPC · JPL
375565	2008 UO_{327}	—	October 30, 2008	Catalina	CSS	EMA	4.7 km	MPC · JPL
375566	2008 UZ_{329}	—	October 31, 2008	Kitt Peak	Spacewatch	·	3.5 km	MPC · JPL
375567	2008 US_{331}	—	October 31, 2008	Mount Lemmon	Mount Lemmon Survey	·	3.3 km	MPC · JPL
375568	2008 UA_{335}	—	October 20, 2008	Kitt Peak	Spacewatch	·	3.6 km	MPC · JPL
375569	2008 UR_{336}	—	October 3, 2008	Mount Lemmon	Mount Lemmon Survey	TIR	3.9 km	MPC · JPL
375570	2008 UB_{337}	—	October 20, 2008	Kitt Peak	Spacewatch	·	2.7 km	MPC · JPL
375571	2008 UU_{337}	—	October 20, 2008	Kitt Peak	Spacewatch	KOR	1.5 km	MPC · JPL
375572	2008 UB_{343}	—	October 20, 2008	Kitt Peak	Spacewatch	·	2.9 km	MPC · JPL
375573	2008 UG_{344}	—	October 30, 2008	Catalina	CSS	·	2.6 km	MPC · JPL
375574	2008 UL_{348}	—	October 24, 2008	Kitt Peak	Spacewatch	·	2.4 km	MPC · JPL
375575	2008 UD_{349}	—	October 27, 2008	Mount Lemmon	Mount Lemmon Survey	·	2.8 km	MPC · JPL
375576	2008 UT_{349}	—	October 28, 2008	Mount Lemmon	Mount Lemmon Survey	·	2.5 km	MPC · JPL
375577	2008 UP_{353}	—	October 23, 2008	Kitt Peak	Spacewatch	·	2.2 km	MPC · JPL
375578	2008 UV_{355}	—	October 27, 2008	Mount Lemmon	Mount Lemmon Survey	·	3.3 km	MPC · JPL
375579	2008 UL_{358}	—	October 26, 2008	Mount Lemmon	Mount Lemmon Survey	·	5.0 km	MPC · JPL
375580	2008 UA_{361}	—	October 25, 2008	Catalina	CSS	·	4.6 km	MPC · JPL
375581	2008 UU_{369}	—	October 30, 2008	Kitt Peak	Spacewatch	VER	4.3 km	MPC · JPL
375582	2008 UK_{370}	—	October 29, 2008	Socorro	LINEAR	·	2.7 km	MPC · JPL
375583	2008 VB_{2}	—	November 2, 2008	Socorro	LINEAR	·	3.6 km	MPC · JPL
375584	2008 VX_{2}	—	October 21, 2008	Mount Lemmon	Mount Lemmon Survey	·	4.6 km	MPC · JPL
375585	2008 VD_{12}	—	November 2, 2008	Mount Lemmon	Mount Lemmon Survey	·	2.8 km	MPC · JPL
375586	2008 VB_{14}	—	November 2, 2008	Mount Lemmon	Mount Lemmon Survey	·	3.9 km	MPC · JPL
375587	2008 VJ_{16}	—	November 1, 2008	Kitt Peak	Spacewatch	·	1.8 km	MPC · JPL
375588	2008 VK_{19}	—	November 1, 2008	Catalina	CSS	·	5.7 km	MPC · JPL
375589	2008 VJ_{20}	—	November 1, 2008	Mount Lemmon	Mount Lemmon Survey	·	1.8 km	MPC · JPL
375590	2008 VR_{25}	—	November 2, 2008	Kitt Peak	Spacewatch	TEL	1.4 km	MPC · JPL
375591	2008 VP_{29}	—	November 2, 2008	Kitt Peak	Spacewatch	EOS	1.9 km	MPC · JPL
375592	2008 VX_{38}	—	September 24, 2008	Mount Lemmon	Mount Lemmon Survey	·	3.4 km	MPC · JPL
375593	2008 VZ_{39}	—	November 2, 2008	Kitt Peak	Spacewatch	·	4.1 km	MPC · JPL
375594	2008 VZ_{40}	—	October 21, 2008	Kitt Peak	Spacewatch	EOS	2.4 km	MPC · JPL
375595	2008 VK_{48}	—	November 3, 2008	Kitt Peak	Spacewatch	THM	1.6 km	MPC · JPL
375596	2008 VN_{58}	—	November 7, 2008	Kitt Peak	Spacewatch	VER	2.9 km	MPC · JPL
375597	2008 VJ_{61}	—	November 8, 2008	Mount Lemmon	Mount Lemmon Survey	·	1.9 km	MPC · JPL
375598	2008 VA_{74}	—	November 7, 2008	Mount Lemmon	Mount Lemmon Survey	·	2.0 km	MPC · JPL
375599	2008 VY_{76}	—	November 2, 2008	Mount Lemmon	Mount Lemmon Survey	VER	3.6 km	MPC · JPL
375600	2008 VB_{77}	—	November 2, 2008	Mount Lemmon	Mount Lemmon Survey	VER	4.3 km	MPC · JPL

== 375601–375700 ==
back to top

Designation			Discovery			Properties		Ref
Permanent	Provisional	Named after	Date	Site	Discoverer(s)	Category	Diam.	Ref
375601	2008 VV_{78}	—	November 8, 2008	Kitt Peak	Spacewatch	·	2.2 km	MPC · JPL
375602	2008 WO_{5}	—	November 17, 2008	Kitt Peak	Spacewatch	·	1.6 km	MPC · JPL
375603	2008 WZ_{5}	—	October 28, 2008	Kitt Peak	Spacewatch	VER	3.2 km	MPC · JPL
375604	2008 WU_{12}	—	November 18, 2008	Catalina	CSS	·	2.6 km	MPC · JPL
375605	2008 WY_{12}	—	October 27, 2008	Mount Lemmon	Mount Lemmon Survey	·	2.8 km	MPC · JPL
375606	2008 WE_{17}	—	November 17, 2008	Kitt Peak	Spacewatch	THM	2.7 km	MPC · JPL
375607	2008 WL_{24}	—	November 18, 2008	Kitt Peak	Spacewatch	·	2.8 km	MPC · JPL
375608	2008 WB_{25}	—	November 18, 2008	Catalina	CSS	·	3.5 km	MPC · JPL
375609	2008 WQ_{35}	—	November 17, 2008	Kitt Peak	Spacewatch	HYG	3.3 km	MPC · JPL
375610	2008 WQ_{36}	—	November 17, 2008	Kitt Peak	Spacewatch	KOR	1.4 km	MPC · JPL
375611	2008 WA_{40}	—	November 17, 2008	Kitt Peak	Spacewatch	·	2.7 km	MPC · JPL
375612	2008 WY_{41}	—	November 17, 2008	Kitt Peak	Spacewatch	·	2.3 km	MPC · JPL
375613	2008 WG_{45}	—	November 17, 2008	Kitt Peak	Spacewatch	·	1.9 km	MPC · JPL
375614	2008 WY_{46}	—	November 17, 2008	Kitt Peak	Spacewatch	THM	2.6 km	MPC · JPL
375615	2008 WY_{47}	—	November 17, 2008	Kitt Peak	Spacewatch	·	4.2 km	MPC · JPL
375616	2008 WZ_{47}	—	November 17, 2008	Kitt Peak	Spacewatch	·	3.4 km	MPC · JPL
375617	2008 WX_{60}	—	November 19, 2008	Socorro	LINEAR	·	3.3 km	MPC · JPL
375618	2008 WS_{75}	—	November 20, 2008	Kitt Peak	Spacewatch	·	2.8 km	MPC · JPL
375619	2008 WJ_{85}	—	November 20, 2008	Kitt Peak	Spacewatch	·	2.9 km	MPC · JPL
375620	2008 WF_{88}	—	November 21, 2008	Mount Lemmon	Mount Lemmon Survey	·	2.4 km	MPC · JPL
375621	2008 WH_{93}	—	November 17, 2008	Catalina	CSS	H	700 m	MPC · JPL
375622	2008 WL_{103}	—	September 28, 2008	Mount Lemmon	Mount Lemmon Survey	·	3.6 km	MPC · JPL
375623	2008 WX_{105}	—	November 2, 2008	Catalina	CSS	EOS	2.3 km	MPC · JPL
375624	2008 WZ_{114}	—	November 30, 2008	Kitt Peak	Spacewatch	·	3.2 km	MPC · JPL
375625	2008 WM_{116}	—	February 12, 2004	Kitt Peak	Spacewatch	·	2.7 km	MPC · JPL
375626	2008 WP_{121}	—	November 29, 2008	Bergisch Gladbach	W. Bickel	·	3.4 km	MPC · JPL
375627	2008 WK_{122}	—	November 6, 2008	Mount Lemmon	Mount Lemmon Survey	·	2.2 km	MPC · JPL
375628	2008 WX_{136}	—	November 21, 2008	Kitt Peak	Spacewatch	·	5.4 km	MPC · JPL
375629	2008 XB_{3}	—	November 29, 1997	Kitt Peak	Spacewatch	·	2.5 km	MPC · JPL
375630	2008 XW_{13}	—	October 20, 2008	Kitt Peak	Spacewatch	·	2.9 km	MPC · JPL
375631	2008 XZ_{14}	—	December 1, 2008	Kitt Peak	Spacewatch	·	2.3 km	MPC · JPL
375632	2008 XV_{16}	—	December 1, 2008	Kitt Peak	Spacewatch	·	6.5 km	MPC · JPL
375633	2008 XA_{18}	—	December 1, 2008	Kitt Peak	Spacewatch	·	3.2 km	MPC · JPL
375634	2008 XO_{29}	—	December 5, 2008	Catalina	CSS	·	8.1 km	MPC · JPL
375635	2008 XN_{48}	—	December 4, 2008	Mount Lemmon	Mount Lemmon Survey	THM	2.3 km	MPC · JPL
375636	2008 XJ_{56}	—	December 5, 2008	Mount Lemmon	Mount Lemmon Survey	·	3.4 km	MPC · JPL
375637	2008 YC_{5}	—	December 22, 2008	Piszkéstető	K. Sárneczky	·	5.9 km	MPC · JPL
375638	2008 YK_{12}	—	December 21, 2008	Mount Lemmon	Mount Lemmon Survey	THM	2.1 km	MPC · JPL
375639	2008 YX_{27}	—	December 28, 2008	Taunus	Karge, S., R. Kling	·	3.0 km	MPC · JPL
375640	2008 YV_{42}	—	December 29, 2008	Kitt Peak	Spacewatch	·	2.8 km	MPC · JPL
375641	2008 YL_{66}	—	December 29, 2008	Catalina	CSS	H	740 m	MPC · JPL
375642	2008 YK_{84}	—	December 31, 2008	Mount Lemmon	Mount Lemmon Survey	·	3.5 km	MPC · JPL
375643	2008 YL_{87}	—	March 15, 2004	Kitt Peak	Spacewatch	THM	1.9 km	MPC · JPL
375644	2008 YF_{99}	—	October 30, 2007	Mount Lemmon	Mount Lemmon Survey	CYB	3.4 km	MPC · JPL
375645	2008 YR_{110}	—	December 31, 2008	Kitt Peak	Spacewatch	·	1.7 km	MPC · JPL
375646	2008 YK_{128}	—	December 30, 2008	Purple Mountain	PMO NEO Survey Program	HYG	4.4 km	MPC · JPL
375647	2008 YY_{155}	—	December 22, 2008	Catalina	CSS	·	3.8 km	MPC · JPL
375648	2009 AX	—	January 1, 2009	Kachina	Hobart, J.	·	3.3 km	MPC · JPL
375649	2009 BZ	—	January 16, 2009	Dauban	Kugel, F.	·	2.4 km	MPC · JPL
375650	2009 BV_{17}	—	January 16, 2009	Mount Lemmon	Mount Lemmon Survey	·	2.5 km	MPC · JPL
375651	2009 BC_{27}	—	August 29, 2005	Kitt Peak	Spacewatch	3:2	5.3 km	MPC · JPL
375652	2009 BZ_{31}	—	January 16, 2009	Kitt Peak	Spacewatch	·	2.0 km	MPC · JPL
375653	2009 BJ_{60}	—	January 16, 2009	La Sagra	OAM	CYB	5.0 km	MPC · JPL
375654	2009 BW_{97}	—	January 26, 2009	Mount Lemmon	Mount Lemmon Survey	·	2.1 km	MPC · JPL
375655	2009 BV_{154}	—	March 11, 2003	Kitt Peak	Spacewatch	CYB	4.6 km	MPC · JPL
375656	2009 BA_{182}	—	January 31, 2009	Mount Lemmon	Mount Lemmon Survey	·	730 m	MPC · JPL
375657	2009 CP_{5}	—	February 14, 2009	Catalina	CSS	APO · critical	180 m	MPC · JPL
375658	2009 CU_{27}	—	February 1, 2009	Kitt Peak	Spacewatch	·	630 m	MPC · JPL
375659	2009 CQ_{33}	—	February 2, 2009	Kitt Peak	Spacewatch	CYB	3.5 km	MPC · JPL
375660	2009 CB_{45}	—	January 30, 2009	Catalina	CSS	H	720 m	MPC · JPL
375661	2009 DT_{17}	—	February 19, 2009	Mount Lemmon	Mount Lemmon Survey	·	4.1 km	MPC · JPL
375662	2009 DB_{48}	—	February 20, 2009	Catalina	CSS	H	620 m	MPC · JPL
375663	2009 DW_{109}	—	February 19, 2009	Catalina	CSS	H	730 m	MPC · JPL
375664	2009 DZ_{127}	—	February 21, 2009	Kitt Peak	Spacewatch	3:2 · SHU	5.3 km	MPC · JPL
375665	2009 DS_{141}	—	February 27, 2009	Mount Lemmon	Mount Lemmon Survey	3:2	5.2 km	MPC · JPL
375666	2009 EU_{3}	—	March 15, 2009	Kitt Peak	Spacewatch	·	1.5 km	MPC · JPL
375667	2009 EP_{20}	—	March 1, 2009	Kitt Peak	Spacewatch	·	690 m	MPC · JPL
375668	2009 FW_{1}	—	March 17, 2009	Taunus	E. Schwab, R. Kling	H	530 m	MPC · JPL
375669	2009 FA_{32}	—	March 26, 2009	Cerro Burek	Burek, Cerro	L5	12 km	MPC · JPL
375670	2009 FX_{50}	—	March 28, 2009	Kitt Peak	Spacewatch	·	1.0 km	MPC · JPL
375671	2009 FE_{54}	—	March 29, 2009	Mount Lemmon	Mount Lemmon Survey	·	880 m	MPC · JPL
375672	2009 FS_{65}	—	March 19, 2009	Calar Alto	F. Hormuth	·	1.6 km	MPC · JPL
375673	2009 FP_{73}	—	March 25, 2009	Mount Lemmon	Mount Lemmon Survey	·	1.1 km	MPC · JPL
375674	2009 HD_{5}	—	March 16, 2009	Kitt Peak	Spacewatch	·	790 m	MPC · JPL
375675	2009 HC_{6}	—	April 17, 2009	Kitt Peak	Spacewatch	·	720 m	MPC · JPL
375676	2009 HU_{13}	—	March 17, 2009	Kitt Peak	Spacewatch	·	760 m	MPC · JPL
375677	2009 HF_{20}	—	April 17, 2009	Catalina	CSS	H	680 m	MPC · JPL
375678	2009 HH_{28}	—	April 18, 2009	Kitt Peak	Spacewatch	·	660 m	MPC · JPL
375679	2009 HO_{37}	—	April 17, 2009	Catalina	CSS	·	840 m	MPC · JPL
375680	2009 HW_{40}	—	April 20, 2009	Kitt Peak	Spacewatch	·	840 m	MPC · JPL
375681	2009 HL_{41}	—	April 20, 2009	Kitt Peak	Spacewatch	·	700 m	MPC · JPL
375682	2009 HV_{94}	—	April 29, 2009	Cerro Burek	Burek, Cerro	·	1.0 km	MPC · JPL
375683	2009 HD_{104}	—	April 21, 2009	Kitt Peak	Spacewatch	·	740 m	MPC · JPL
375684	2009 HV_{105}	—	April 21, 2002	Kitt Peak	Spacewatch	·	660 m	MPC · JPL
375685	2009 JF	—	May 2, 2009	La Sagra	OAM	·	690 m	MPC · JPL
375686	2009 KZ_{14}	—	May 26, 2009	Catalina	CSS	·	950 m	MPC · JPL
375687	2009 KG_{21}	—	May 29, 2009	Kitt Peak	Spacewatch	·	1.1 km	MPC · JPL
375688	2009 KN_{22}	—	May 31, 2009	Skylive	Tozzi, F.	PHO	1.0 km	MPC · JPL
375689	2009 KT_{23}	—	October 3, 2006	Mount Lemmon	Mount Lemmon Survey	·	1.0 km	MPC · JPL
375690	2009 KH_{36}	—	November 30, 2003	Kitt Peak	Spacewatch	·	880 m	MPC · JPL
375691	2009 ME_{1}	—	June 22, 2009	Calvin-Rehoboth	Calvin College	V	800 m	MPC · JPL
375692	2009 MY_{8}	—	June 28, 2009	La Sagra	OAM	·	1.1 km	MPC · JPL
375693	2009 NG_{2}	—	July 14, 2009	Kitt Peak	Spacewatch	·	1.2 km	MPC · JPL
375694	2009 OM_{4}	—	July 19, 2009	La Sagra	OAM	·	1.2 km	MPC · JPL
375695	2009 OY_{4}	—	June 27, 2009	Mount Lemmon	Mount Lemmon Survey	NYS	1.6 km	MPC · JPL
375696	2009 OB_{5}	—	July 19, 2009	La Sagra	OAM	·	1.4 km	MPC · JPL
375697	2009 OD_{21}	—	July 27, 2009	La Sagra	OAM	·	1.4 km	MPC · JPL
375698	2009 OE_{25}	—	July 20, 2009	Siding Spring	SSS	·	1.9 km	MPC · JPL
375699	2009 ON_{25}	—	October 22, 2006	Catalina	CSS	V	940 m	MPC · JPL
375700	2009 PY_{1}	—	August 15, 2009	Altschwendt	W. Ries	·	1.4 km	MPC · JPL

== 375701–375800 ==
back to top

Designation			Discovery			Properties		Ref
Permanent	Provisional	Named after	Date	Site	Discoverer(s)	Category	Diam.	Ref
375701	2009 PY_{3}	—	September 5, 1994	La Silla	E. W. Elst	·	1.0 km	MPC · JPL
375702	2009 PC_{4}	—	August 14, 2009	La Sagra	OAM	·	1.3 km	MPC · JPL
375703	2009 PD_{5}	—	August 15, 2009	La Sagra	OAM	·	1.4 km	MPC · JPL
375704	2009 PJ_{6}	—	August 15, 2009	Kitt Peak	Spacewatch	·	850 m	MPC · JPL
375705	2009 PU_{6}	—	August 15, 2009	Kitt Peak	Spacewatch	PHO	750 m	MPC · JPL
375706	2009 PN_{7}	—	August 15, 2009	Catalina	CSS	·	1.2 km	MPC · JPL
375707	2009 PT_{10}	—	August 1, 2009	Kitt Peak	Spacewatch	NYS	1.2 km	MPC · JPL
375708	2009 PF_{12}	—	June 23, 2009	Mount Lemmon	Mount Lemmon Survey	NYS	1.4 km	MPC · JPL
375709	2009 PZ_{13}	—	August 15, 2009	Kitt Peak	Spacewatch	·	1.8 km	MPC · JPL
375710	2009 PD_{18}	—	August 15, 2009	Kitt Peak	Spacewatch	·	1.2 km	MPC · JPL
375711	2009 PC_{19}	—	August 15, 2009	Kitt Peak	Spacewatch	·	1.1 km	MPC · JPL
375712	2009 PK_{19}	—	August 15, 2009	Kitt Peak	Spacewatch	·	1.3 km	MPC · JPL
375713	2009 PK_{21}	—	December 5, 2002	Socorro	LINEAR	·	1.9 km	MPC · JPL
375714	2009 QE_{9}	—	August 19, 2009	Skylive	Tozzi, F.	·	2.0 km	MPC · JPL
375715	2009 QF_{19}	—	August 18, 2009	La Sagra	OAM	NYS	1.3 km	MPC · JPL
375716	2009 QJ_{20}	—	August 19, 2009	La Sagra	OAM	·	1.5 km	MPC · JPL
375717	2009 QO_{20}	—	August 19, 2009	La Sagra	OAM	NYS	1.3 km	MPC · JPL
375718	2009 QU_{20}	—	August 19, 2009	La Sagra	OAM	·	1.5 km	MPC · JPL
375719	2009 QK_{21}	—	August 19, 2009	La Sagra	OAM	·	1.2 km	MPC · JPL
375720	2009 QF_{23}	—	August 16, 2009	La Sagra	OAM	V	720 m	MPC · JPL
375721	2009 QG_{32}	—	August 10, 2009	Kitt Peak	Spacewatch	·	1.3 km	MPC · JPL
375722	2009 QK_{32}	—	August 25, 2009	Plana	Fratev, F.	·	1.1 km	MPC · JPL
375723	2009 QM_{38}	—	August 29, 2009	Bergisch Gladbach	W. Bickel	RAF	1.1 km	MPC · JPL
375724	2009 QO_{40}	—	August 26, 2009	La Sagra	OAM	NYS	1.2 km	MPC · JPL
375725	2009 QD_{44}	—	August 15, 2009	Kitt Peak	Spacewatch	·	1.4 km	MPC · JPL
375726	2009 QB_{45}	—	August 27, 2009	Catalina	CSS	·	680 m	MPC · JPL
375727	2009 QD_{47}	—	August 28, 2009	La Sagra	OAM	·	1.5 km	MPC · JPL
375728	2009 QM_{47}	—	August 28, 2009	La Sagra	OAM	NYS	1.2 km	MPC · JPL
375729	2009 QT_{56}	—	August 16, 2009	La Sagra	OAM	PHO	1.2 km	MPC · JPL
375730	2009 QK_{63}	—	August 28, 2009	Kitt Peak	Spacewatch	·	2.9 km	MPC · JPL
375731	2009 RY_{7}	—	September 12, 2009	Kitt Peak	Spacewatch	NYS	1.1 km	MPC · JPL
375732	2009 RM_{12}	—	September 12, 2009	Kitt Peak	Spacewatch	·	1.2 km	MPC · JPL
375733	2009 RC_{31}	—	September 14, 2009	Kitt Peak	Spacewatch	·	1.4 km	MPC · JPL
375734	2009 RQ_{34}	—	September 14, 2009	Kitt Peak	Spacewatch	·	1.4 km	MPC · JPL
375735	2009 RC_{35}	—	September 14, 2009	Kitt Peak	Spacewatch	·	1.7 km	MPC · JPL
375736	2009 RA_{39}	—	September 15, 2009	Kitt Peak	Spacewatch	·	1.3 km	MPC · JPL
375737	2009 RL_{47}	—	September 15, 2009	Kitt Peak	Spacewatch	·	1.1 km	MPC · JPL
375738	2009 RU_{50}	—	September 15, 2009	Kitt Peak	Spacewatch	·	1.7 km	MPC · JPL
375739	2009 RF_{54}	—	November 18, 2001	Kitt Peak	Spacewatch	·	1.1 km	MPC · JPL
375740	2009 RU_{58}	—	September 15, 2009	Kitt Peak	Spacewatch	·	1.7 km	MPC · JPL
375741	2009 RE_{62}	—	September 14, 2009	Kitt Peak	Spacewatch	·	1.8 km	MPC · JPL
375742	2009 RW_{71}	—	September 15, 2009	Kitt Peak	Spacewatch	·	1.3 km	MPC · JPL
375743	2009 SG_{12}	—	September 16, 2009	Mount Lemmon	Mount Lemmon Survey	·	1.0 km	MPC · JPL
375744	2009 SG_{29}	—	September 16, 2009	Kitt Peak	Spacewatch	·	2.2 km	MPC · JPL
375745	2009 SU_{33}	—	September 16, 2009	Kitt Peak	Spacewatch	·	1.8 km	MPC · JPL
375746	2009 SY_{39}	—	September 16, 2009	Kitt Peak	Spacewatch	·	1.1 km	MPC · JPL
375747	2009 SP_{40}	—	September 16, 2009	Kitt Peak	Spacewatch	·	980 m	MPC · JPL
375748	2009 ST_{40}	—	September 16, 2009	Kitt Peak	Spacewatch	·	1.6 km	MPC · JPL
375749	2009 SL_{41}	—	September 16, 2009	Mount Lemmon	Mount Lemmon Survey	MAS	680 m	MPC · JPL
375750	2009 SJ_{42}	—	September 16, 2009	Kitt Peak	Spacewatch	·	1.2 km	MPC · JPL
375751	2009 SU_{42}	—	September 16, 2009	Kitt Peak	Spacewatch	·	1.6 km	MPC · JPL
375752	2009 SU_{52}	—	September 17, 2009	Mount Lemmon	Mount Lemmon Survey	V	760 m	MPC · JPL
375753	2009 SL_{56}	—	September 17, 2009	Kitt Peak	Spacewatch	·	2.1 km	MPC · JPL
375754	2009 SX_{63}	—	September 17, 2009	Mount Lemmon	Mount Lemmon Survey	·	1.1 km	MPC · JPL
375755	2009 SF_{77}	—	September 17, 2009	Kitt Peak	Spacewatch	·	1.4 km	MPC · JPL
375756	2009 SJ_{77}	—	May 30, 2008	Mount Lemmon	Mount Lemmon Survey	(194)	2.1 km	MPC · JPL
375757	2009 SV_{81}	—	September 18, 2009	Mount Lemmon	Mount Lemmon Survey	MAS	730 m	MPC · JPL
375758	2009 SP_{96}	—	September 19, 2009	Mount Lemmon	Mount Lemmon Survey	(5)	1.4 km	MPC · JPL
375759	2009 SU_{100}	—	September 20, 2009	Moletai	K. Černis, Zdanavicius, J.	BAR	1.3 km	MPC · JPL
375760	2009 ST_{110}	—	September 17, 2009	Catalina	CSS	·	1.1 km	MPC · JPL
375761	2009 SS_{112}	—	September 18, 2009	Kitt Peak	Spacewatch	·	1.6 km	MPC · JPL
375762	2009 SN_{118}	—	September 18, 2009	Kitt Peak	Spacewatch	·	1.2 km	MPC · JPL
375763	2009 SN_{125}	—	September 18, 2009	Kitt Peak	Spacewatch	·	2.1 km	MPC · JPL
375764	2009 SJ_{130}	—	September 18, 2009	Kitt Peak	Spacewatch	·	1.9 km	MPC · JPL
375765	2009 SV_{131}	—	September 18, 2009	Kitt Peak	Spacewatch	JUN	1.0 km	MPC · JPL
375766	2009 SC_{134}	—	September 18, 2009	Kitt Peak	Spacewatch	·	1.3 km	MPC · JPL
375767	2009 SM_{137}	—	September 18, 2009	Kitt Peak	Spacewatch	·	1.5 km	MPC · JPL
375768	2009 SJ_{138}	—	September 18, 2009	Kitt Peak	Spacewatch	MAR	1.1 km	MPC · JPL
375769	2009 SN_{146}	—	September 19, 2009	Kitt Peak	Spacewatch	·	1.7 km	MPC · JPL
375770	2009 SU_{149}	—	March 10, 2008	Kitt Peak	Spacewatch	·	1.1 km	MPC · JPL
375771	2009 ST_{150}	—	August 1, 2005	Campo Imperatore	CINEOS	V	680 m	MPC · JPL
375772	2009 SX_{152}	—	February 16, 2007	Mount Lemmon	Mount Lemmon Survey	·	1.2 km	MPC · JPL
375773	2009 SD_{156}	—	September 20, 2009	Kitt Peak	Spacewatch	·	1.3 km	MPC · JPL
375774	2009 SX_{156}	—	September 20, 2009	Kitt Peak	Spacewatch	EUN	1.1 km	MPC · JPL
375775	2009 SL_{160}	—	September 20, 2009	Kitt Peak	Spacewatch	·	870 m	MPC · JPL
375776	2009 SZ_{200}	—	September 22, 2009	Mount Lemmon	Mount Lemmon Survey	·	2.1 km	MPC · JPL
375777	2009 SH_{230}	—	September 16, 2009	Catalina	CSS	PHO	1.2 km	MPC · JPL
375778	2009 SA_{239}	—	September 16, 2009	Catalina	CSS	·	2.7 km	MPC · JPL
375779	2009 SK_{245}	—	September 23, 2009	Tiki	Teamo, N.	·	1.3 km	MPC · JPL
375780	2009 SU_{281}	—	September 25, 2009	Kitt Peak	Spacewatch	·	1.3 km	MPC · JPL
375781	2009 SU_{284}	—	September 25, 2009	Mount Lemmon	Mount Lemmon Survey	·	820 m	MPC · JPL
375782	2009 SE_{285}	—	September 25, 2009	Mount Lemmon	Mount Lemmon Survey	·	1.6 km	MPC · JPL
375783	2009 SC_{290}	—	September 25, 2009	Kitt Peak	Spacewatch	EUN	1.6 km	MPC · JPL
375784	2009 SZ_{291}	—	September 26, 2009	Mount Lemmon	Mount Lemmon Survey	·	1.5 km	MPC · JPL
375785	2009 SF_{295}	—	September 27, 2009	Mount Lemmon	Mount Lemmon Survey	·	1.4 km	MPC · JPL
375786	2009 SZ_{296}	—	September 21, 2009	Catalina	CSS	EUN	1.4 km	MPC · JPL
375787	2009 SB_{309}	—	August 28, 2009	Kitt Peak	Spacewatch	·	1.0 km	MPC · JPL
375788	2009 SR_{309}	—	September 18, 2009	Kitt Peak	Spacewatch	·	1.6 km	MPC · JPL
375789	2009 SU_{327}	—	September 26, 2009	Kitt Peak	Spacewatch	·	1.5 km	MPC · JPL
375790	2009 SN_{328}	—	September 28, 2009	Kitt Peak	Spacewatch	BAR	1.4 km	MPC · JPL
375791	2009 SO_{332}	—	September 21, 2009	Catalina	CSS	JUN	2.2 km	MPC · JPL
375792	2009 SN_{339}	—	September 22, 2009	Mount Lemmon	Mount Lemmon Survey	DOR	1.9 km	MPC · JPL
375793	2009 SR_{339}	—	September 22, 2009	Mount Lemmon	Mount Lemmon Survey	·	2.2 km	MPC · JPL
375794	2009 SA_{346}	—	September 22, 2009	Kitt Peak	Spacewatch	(5)	1.1 km	MPC · JPL
375795	2009 SW_{356}	—	September 18, 2009	Kitt Peak	Spacewatch	·	1.2 km	MPC · JPL
375796	2009 SY_{358}	—	September 20, 2009	Kitt Peak	Spacewatch	·	1.1 km	MPC · JPL
375797	2009 SU_{363}	—	September 23, 2009	Mount Lemmon	Mount Lemmon Survey	·	1.7 km	MPC · JPL
375798 Divini	2009 TA_{4}	Divini	October 12, 2009	Vallemare Borbona	V. S. Casulli	EUN	1.0 km	MPC · JPL
375799	2009 TO_{11}	—	October 13, 2009	Bergisch Gladbach	W. Bickel	·	1.2 km	MPC · JPL
375800	2009 TM_{12}	—	September 16, 2009	Mount Lemmon	Mount Lemmon Survey	·	1.2 km	MPC · JPL

== 375801–375900 ==
back to top

Designation			Discovery			Properties		Ref
Permanent	Provisional	Named after	Date	Site	Discoverer(s)	Category	Diam.	Ref
375801	2009 TC_{14}	—	September 20, 2009	Moletai	K. Černis, Zdanavicius, J.	·	1.4 km	MPC · JPL
375802	2009 TM_{14}	—	October 11, 2009	Catalina	CSS	·	1.3 km	MPC · JPL
375803	2009 TQ_{15}	—	October 1, 2009	Mount Lemmon	Mount Lemmon Survey	(5)	1.2 km	MPC · JPL
375804	2009 TW_{15}	—	October 1, 2009	Mount Lemmon	Mount Lemmon Survey	·	3.7 km	MPC · JPL
375805	2009 TY_{19}	—	October 11, 2009	Mount Lemmon	Mount Lemmon Survey	·	910 m	MPC · JPL
375806	2009 TE_{22}	—	October 12, 2009	La Sagra	OAM	·	1.3 km	MPC · JPL
375807	2009 TV_{36}	—	October 15, 2009	La Sagra	OAM	·	2.4 km	MPC · JPL
375808	2009 TR_{38}	—	October 15, 2009	La Sagra	OAM	PHO	1.2 km	MPC · JPL
375809	2009 TS_{39}	—	October 14, 2009	Catalina	CSS	·	1.6 km	MPC · JPL
375810	2009 TG_{42}	—	October 11, 2009	Mount Lemmon	Mount Lemmon Survey	(5)	1.0 km	MPC · JPL
375811	2009 TZ_{45}	—	October 12, 2009	Mount Lemmon	Mount Lemmon Survey	·	1.7 km	MPC · JPL
375812	2009 UA_{2}	—	October 17, 2009	Mayhill	Lowe, A.	(10369)	4.1 km	MPC · JPL
375813	2009 UU_{4}	—	October 17, 2009	Bisei SG Center	BATTeRS	(5)	1.1 km	MPC · JPL
375814	2009 UF_{16}	—	October 18, 2009	Kitt Peak	Spacewatch	EUN	1.2 km	MPC · JPL
375815	2009 UT_{25}	—	October 18, 2009	Catalina	CSS	EUN	1.4 km	MPC · JPL
375816	2009 UP_{26}	—	October 21, 2009	Catalina	CSS	·	1.9 km	MPC · JPL
375817	2009 UW_{27}	—	October 22, 2009	Catalina	CSS	·	1.8 km	MPC · JPL
375818	2009 UZ_{27}	—	October 22, 2009	Catalina	CSS	(5)	1.2 km	MPC · JPL
375819	2009 UO_{35}	—	October 21, 2009	Mount Lemmon	Mount Lemmon Survey	·	1.5 km	MPC · JPL
375820	2009 UV_{41}	—	October 18, 2009	Mount Lemmon	Mount Lemmon Survey	·	2.2 km	MPC · JPL
375821	2009 UC_{47}	—	October 18, 2009	Mount Lemmon	Mount Lemmon Survey	·	2.2 km	MPC · JPL
375822	2009 UN_{47}	—	October 18, 2009	Kitt Peak	Spacewatch	·	1.5 km	MPC · JPL
375823	2009 UB_{62}	—	September 17, 2009	Kitt Peak	Spacewatch	·	1.6 km	MPC · JPL
375824	2009 UA_{69}	—	October 18, 2009	Mount Lemmon	Mount Lemmon Survey	·	1.8 km	MPC · JPL
375825	2009 UQ_{72}	—	October 23, 2009	Mount Lemmon	Mount Lemmon Survey	·	1.7 km	MPC · JPL
375826	2009 UC_{73}	—	October 18, 2009	Mount Lemmon	Mount Lemmon Survey	·	1.5 km	MPC · JPL
375827	2009 UO_{78}	—	October 21, 2009	Mount Lemmon	Mount Lemmon Survey	·	2.8 km	MPC · JPL
375828	2009 UD_{81}	—	October 22, 2009	Catalina	CSS	·	1.7 km	MPC · JPL
375829	2009 UB_{86}	—	October 24, 2009	Mount Lemmon	Mount Lemmon Survey	·	760 m	MPC · JPL
375830	2009 UF_{87}	—	October 24, 2009	Catalina	CSS	(5)	1.4 km	MPC · JPL
375831	2009 UO_{87}	—	October 24, 2009	Kitt Peak	Spacewatch	MAR	1.4 km	MPC · JPL
375832 Yurijmedvedev	2009 UH_{92}	Yurijmedvedev	October 22, 2009	Zelenchukskaya Stn	T. V. Krjačko	·	1.6 km	MPC · JPL
375833	2009 UQ_{100}	—	October 23, 2009	Mount Lemmon	Mount Lemmon Survey	KON	2.5 km	MPC · JPL
375834	2009 UW_{108}	—	October 23, 2009	Kitt Peak	Spacewatch	EUN	1.4 km	MPC · JPL
375835	2009 UV_{112}	—	October 26, 2009	Catalina	CSS	·	2.3 km	MPC · JPL
375836	2009 UB_{117}	—	October 22, 2009	Mount Lemmon	Mount Lemmon Survey	·	1.7 km	MPC · JPL
375837	2009 UR_{123}	—	October 18, 2009	La Sagra	OAM	·	2.5 km	MPC · JPL
375838	2009 UF_{128}	—	October 25, 2009	Kitt Peak	Spacewatch	·	1.5 km	MPC · JPL
375839	2009 UO_{130}	—	October 24, 2009	Catalina	CSS	·	2.9 km	MPC · JPL
375840	2009 UR_{136}	—	October 24, 2009	Catalina	CSS	EUN	1.4 km	MPC · JPL
375841	2009 UY_{137}	—	October 24, 2009	Catalina	CSS	·	2.6 km	MPC · JPL
375842	2009 UQ_{141}	—	October 23, 2009	Mount Lemmon	Mount Lemmon Survey	·	1.2 km	MPC · JPL
375843	2009 UK_{148}	—	October 22, 2009	Mount Lemmon	Mount Lemmon Survey	·	1.4 km	MPC · JPL
375844	2009 UT_{149}	—	October 26, 2009	Mount Lemmon	Mount Lemmon Survey	·	1.9 km	MPC · JPL
375845	2009 UJ_{151}	—	October 16, 2009	Mount Lemmon	Mount Lemmon Survey	·	1.7 km	MPC · JPL
375846	2009 UR_{151}	—	October 22, 2009	Mount Lemmon	Mount Lemmon Survey	(5)	1.4 km	MPC · JPL
375847	2009 UQ_{152}	—	October 30, 2009	Mount Lemmon	Mount Lemmon Survey	GEF	1.3 km	MPC · JPL
375848	2009 UZ_{152}	—	October 23, 2009	Kitt Peak	Spacewatch	·	2.3 km	MPC · JPL
375849	2009 VL_{6}	—	September 16, 2009	Mount Lemmon	Mount Lemmon Survey	·	1.8 km	MPC · JPL
375850	2009 VD_{7}	—	October 30, 2009	Mount Lemmon	Mount Lemmon Survey	·	1.3 km	MPC · JPL
375851	2009 VE_{9}	—	November 8, 2009	Mount Lemmon	Mount Lemmon Survey	·	1.4 km	MPC · JPL
375852	2009 VZ_{11}	—	November 8, 2009	Mount Lemmon	Mount Lemmon Survey	·	1.7 km	MPC · JPL
375853	2009 VG_{13}	—	October 22, 2005	Kitt Peak	Spacewatch	NYS	1.1 km	MPC · JPL
375854	2009 VA_{14}	—	November 8, 2009	Mount Lemmon	Mount Lemmon Survey	·	2.2 km	MPC · JPL
375855	2009 VQ_{14}	—	November 8, 2009	Mount Lemmon	Mount Lemmon Survey	·	1.1 km	MPC · JPL
375856	2009 VZ_{16}	—	November 8, 2009	Mount Lemmon	Mount Lemmon Survey	·	1.9 km	MPC · JPL
375857	2009 VG_{17}	—	November 8, 2009	Catalina	CSS	·	1.6 km	MPC · JPL
375858	2009 VW_{18}	—	November 9, 2009	Kitt Peak	Spacewatch	·	1.3 km	MPC · JPL
375859	2009 VC_{22}	—	November 9, 2009	Mount Lemmon	Mount Lemmon Survey	EUN	1.4 km	MPC · JPL
375860	2009 VX_{22}	—	September 21, 2009	Mount Lemmon	Mount Lemmon Survey	·	2.0 km	MPC · JPL
375861	2009 VM_{28}	—	November 8, 2009	Kitt Peak	Spacewatch	·	1.8 km	MPC · JPL
375862	2009 VV_{32}	—	November 9, 2009	Mount Lemmon	Mount Lemmon Survey	·	2.4 km	MPC · JPL
375863	2009 VL_{33}	—	March 9, 2007	Kitt Peak	Spacewatch	·	2.7 km	MPC · JPL
375864	2009 VZ_{33}	—	November 10, 2009	Mount Lemmon	Mount Lemmon Survey	·	2.0 km	MPC · JPL
375865	2009 VP_{35}	—	September 21, 2009	Mount Lemmon	Mount Lemmon Survey	·	1.5 km	MPC · JPL
375866	2009 VV_{38}	—	November 9, 2009	Kitt Peak	Spacewatch	(5)	1.6 km	MPC · JPL
375867	2009 VR_{39}	—	November 11, 2009	Kitt Peak	Spacewatch	·	1.4 km	MPC · JPL
375868	2009 VW_{39}	—	November 11, 2009	Kitt Peak	Spacewatch	MAR	1.3 km	MPC · JPL
375869	2009 VV_{41}	—	November 9, 2009	Mount Lemmon	Mount Lemmon Survey	·	1.4 km	MPC · JPL
375870	2009 VM_{45}	—	November 11, 2009	Kitt Peak	Spacewatch	·	1.9 km	MPC · JPL
375871	2009 VK_{46}	—	January 14, 2002	Kitt Peak	Spacewatch	·	1.8 km	MPC · JPL
375872	2009 VL_{46}	—	November 9, 2009	Catalina	CSS	·	1.4 km	MPC · JPL
375873	2009 VQ_{50}	—	November 8, 2009	Kitt Peak	Spacewatch	·	2.0 km	MPC · JPL
375874	2009 VT_{50}	—	October 22, 2009	Mount Lemmon	Mount Lemmon Survey	·	2.7 km	MPC · JPL
375875	2009 VO_{51}	—	October 26, 2009	Kitt Peak	Spacewatch	·	1.7 km	MPC · JPL
375876	2009 VC_{57}	—	November 11, 2009	Mount Lemmon	Mount Lemmon Survey	·	3.4 km	MPC · JPL
375877	2009 VY_{57}	—	November 12, 2009	La Sagra	OAM	·	2.1 km	MPC · JPL
375878	2009 VL_{58}	—	November 15, 2009	Catalina	CSS	·	2.4 km	MPC · JPL
375879	2009 VU_{58}	—	November 12, 2009	Dauban	Kugel, F.	·	2.3 km	MPC · JPL
375880	2009 VX_{60}	—	October 14, 2009	Catalina	CSS	·	3.1 km	MPC · JPL
375881	2009 VH_{61}	—	November 8, 2009	Kitt Peak	Spacewatch	·	1.3 km	MPC · JPL
375882	2009 VL_{62}	—	November 8, 2009	Kitt Peak	Spacewatch	·	1.6 km	MPC · JPL
375883	2009 VS_{62}	—	November 8, 2009	Kitt Peak	Spacewatch	·	2.1 km	MPC · JPL
375884	2009 VD_{63}	—	November 8, 2009	Kitt Peak	Spacewatch	·	2.3 km	MPC · JPL
375885	2009 VE_{63}	—	November 8, 2009	Kitt Peak	Spacewatch	·	2.7 km	MPC · JPL
375886	2009 VO_{71}	—	November 10, 2009	Kitt Peak	Spacewatch	·	1.2 km	MPC · JPL
375887	2009 VR_{71}	—	November 11, 2009	Kitt Peak	Spacewatch	(5)	1.3 km	MPC · JPL
375888	2009 VG_{72}	—	November 14, 2009	Socorro	LINEAR	·	1.1 km	MPC · JPL
375889	2009 VJ_{72}	—	November 14, 2009	Socorro	LINEAR	·	1.3 km	MPC · JPL
375890	2009 VN_{72}	—	November 14, 2009	Socorro	LINEAR	·	1.7 km	MPC · JPL
375891	2009 VZ_{75}	—	November 15, 2009	Catalina	CSS	·	1.4 km	MPC · JPL
375892	2009 VQ_{82}	—	November 8, 2009	Kitt Peak	Spacewatch	·	2.2 km	MPC · JPL
375893	2009 VB_{83}	—	August 22, 2004	Kitt Peak	Spacewatch	·	2.1 km	MPC · JPL
375894	2009 VL_{85}	—	November 25, 2005	Kitt Peak	Spacewatch	·	1.2 km	MPC · JPL
375895	2009 VF_{86}	—	November 10, 2009	Kitt Peak	Spacewatch	·	1.4 km	MPC · JPL
375896	2009 VZ_{86}	—	November 10, 2009	Kitt Peak	Spacewatch	HOF	3.5 km	MPC · JPL
375897	2009 VN_{87}	—	November 10, 2009	Kitt Peak	Spacewatch	AGN	1.2 km	MPC · JPL
375898	2009 VU_{91}	—	September 28, 2009	Mount Lemmon	Mount Lemmon Survey	·	2.9 km	MPC · JPL
375899	2009 VQ_{92}	—	October 25, 2009	Kitt Peak	Spacewatch	·	1.7 km	MPC · JPL
375900	2009 VP_{94}	—	November 9, 2009	Kitt Peak	Spacewatch	·	2.3 km	MPC · JPL

== 375901–376000 ==
back to top

Designation			Discovery			Properties		Ref
Permanent	Provisional	Named after	Date	Site	Discoverer(s)	Category	Diam.	Ref
375901	2009 VA_{95}	—	November 9, 2009	Kitt Peak	Spacewatch	·	1.8 km	MPC · JPL
375902	2009 VB_{95}	—	November 9, 2009	Kitt Peak	Spacewatch	·	1.6 km	MPC · JPL
375903	2009 VQ_{96}	—	November 8, 2009	Kitt Peak	Spacewatch	·	1.1 km	MPC · JPL
375904	2009 VJ_{105}	—	November 10, 2009	Catalina	CSS	slow	1.8 km	MPC · JPL
375905	2009 VU_{107}	—	November 8, 2009	Mount Lemmon	Mount Lemmon Survey	MAR	1.4 km	MPC · JPL
375906	2009 VL_{110}	—	November 10, 2009	Mount Lemmon	Mount Lemmon Survey	·	1.5 km	MPC · JPL
375907	2009 VX_{113}	—	November 8, 2009	Kitt Peak	Spacewatch	·	1.5 km	MPC · JPL
375908	2009 VZ_{113}	—	November 8, 2009	Mount Lemmon	Mount Lemmon Survey	KOR	1.3 km	MPC · JPL
375909	2009 VH_{114}	—	November 9, 2009	Kitt Peak	Spacewatch	·	1.8 km	MPC · JPL
375910	2009 WP_{9}	—	November 19, 2009	Socorro	LINEAR	·	2.0 km	MPC · JPL
375911	2009 WP_{10}	—	November 19, 2009	Socorro	LINEAR	EUN	1.6 km	MPC · JPL
375912	2009 WY_{14}	—	November 16, 2009	Mount Lemmon	Mount Lemmon Survey	AGN	1.1 km	MPC · JPL
375913	2009 WY_{18}	—	September 10, 2004	Kitt Peak	Spacewatch	NEM	1.9 km	MPC · JPL
375914	2009 WV_{23}	—	November 19, 2009	Catalina	CSS	EUN	1.7 km	MPC · JPL
375915	2009 WL_{26}	—	April 13, 2007	Siding Spring	SSS	·	2.6 km	MPC · JPL
375916	2009 WF_{28}	—	November 16, 2009	Kitt Peak	Spacewatch	MRX	1.1 km	MPC · JPL
375917	2009 WL_{28}	—	November 16, 2009	Kitt Peak	Spacewatch	·	1.6 km	MPC · JPL
375918	2009 WY_{35}	—	November 17, 2009	Kitt Peak	Spacewatch	EUN	1.2 km	MPC · JPL
375919	2009 WE_{37}	—	November 17, 2009	Kitt Peak	Spacewatch	·	2.1 km	MPC · JPL
375920	2009 WB_{41}	—	November 17, 2009	Kitt Peak	Spacewatch	·	2.0 km	MPC · JPL
375921	2009 WK_{41}	—	December 2, 2004	Kitt Peak	Spacewatch	·	2.0 km	MPC · JPL
375922	2009 WY_{41}	—	November 17, 2009	Kitt Peak	Spacewatch	KOR	1.5 km	MPC · JPL
375923	2009 WB_{43}	—	November 17, 2009	Catalina	CSS	EUN	1.4 km	MPC · JPL
375924	2009 WE_{44}	—	December 5, 2005	Kitt Peak	Spacewatch	·	1.6 km	MPC · JPL
375925	2009 WV_{46}	—	November 18, 2009	Mount Lemmon	Mount Lemmon Survey	·	1.6 km	MPC · JPL
375926	2009 WX_{46}	—	November 18, 2009	Mount Lemmon	Mount Lemmon Survey	ADE	2.1 km	MPC · JPL
375927 Ibara	2009 WY_{52}	Ibara	November 22, 2009	Bisei SG Center	BATTeRS	·	3.2 km	MPC · JPL
375928	2009 WU_{62}	—	November 16, 2009	Mount Lemmon	Mount Lemmon Survey	·	1.8 km	MPC · JPL
375929	2009 WZ_{64}	—	November 17, 2009	Kitt Peak	Spacewatch	·	1.8 km	MPC · JPL
375930	2009 WD_{65}	—	November 17, 2009	Mount Lemmon	Mount Lemmon Survey	·	1.5 km	MPC · JPL
375931	2009 WH_{68}	—	May 5, 2003	Kitt Peak	Spacewatch	·	2.0 km	MPC · JPL
375932	2009 WP_{75}	—	November 18, 2009	Kitt Peak	Spacewatch	(5)	2.0 km	MPC · JPL
375933	2009 WQ_{75}	—	November 18, 2009	Kitt Peak	Spacewatch	·	1.8 km	MPC · JPL
375934	2009 WW_{75}	—	December 28, 2005	Mount Lemmon	Mount Lemmon Survey	·	1.7 km	MPC · JPL
375935	2009 WU_{82}	—	November 19, 2009	Kitt Peak	Spacewatch	·	1.5 km	MPC · JPL
375936	2009 WG_{84}	—	November 19, 2009	Kitt Peak	Spacewatch	·	1.3 km	MPC · JPL
375937	2009 WR_{87}	—	November 19, 2009	Kitt Peak	Spacewatch	·	1.7 km	MPC · JPL
375938	2009 WT_{87}	—	November 19, 2009	Kitt Peak	Spacewatch	·	1.3 km	MPC · JPL
375939	2009 WH_{88}	—	November 19, 2009	Kitt Peak	Spacewatch	·	1.4 km	MPC · JPL
375940	2009 WF_{101}	—	November 22, 2009	Kitt Peak	Spacewatch	·	2.9 km	MPC · JPL
375941	2009 WE_{102}	—	November 22, 2009	Mount Lemmon	Mount Lemmon Survey	·	2.0 km	MPC · JPL
375942	2009 WB_{104}	—	November 10, 2009	Catalina	CSS	EUN	1.6 km	MPC · JPL
375943	2009 WG_{121}	—	December 26, 2005	Mount Lemmon	Mount Lemmon Survey	·	1.3 km	MPC · JPL
375944	2009 WJ_{126}	—	November 20, 2009	Kitt Peak	Spacewatch	EUN	1.9 km	MPC · JPL
375945	2009 WA_{131}	—	April 15, 2007	Kitt Peak	Spacewatch	·	2.1 km	MPC · JPL
375946	2009 WY_{133}	—	September 22, 2009	Mount Lemmon	Mount Lemmon Survey	·	1.9 km	MPC · JPL
375947	2009 WG_{142}	—	October 24, 2009	Catalina	CSS	·	2.9 km	MPC · JPL
375948	2009 WM_{153}	—	November 19, 2009	Mount Lemmon	Mount Lemmon Survey	ADE	2.8 km	MPC · JPL
375949	2009 WH_{165}	—	November 17, 2009	Kitt Peak	Spacewatch	HOF	2.7 km	MPC · JPL
375950	2009 WL_{165}	—	November 21, 2009	Kitt Peak	Spacewatch	KRM	3.1 km	MPC · JPL
375951	2009 WX_{166}	—	November 21, 2009	Kitt Peak	Spacewatch	·	3.4 km	MPC · JPL
375952	2009 WU_{168}	—	November 22, 2009	Kitt Peak	Spacewatch	(5)	1.3 km	MPC · JPL
375953	2009 WD_{169}	—	November 22, 2009	Kitt Peak	Spacewatch	(5)	1.5 km	MPC · JPL
375954	2009 WB_{170}	—	November 22, 2009	Kitt Peak	Spacewatch	·	1.9 km	MPC · JPL
375955	2009 WR_{172}	—	November 22, 2009	Catalina	CSS	·	2.5 km	MPC · JPL
375956	2009 WP_{175}	—	March 13, 2007	Mount Lemmon	Mount Lemmon Survey	·	2.1 km	MPC · JPL
375957	2009 WN_{178}	—	March 16, 2007	Kitt Peak	Spacewatch	·	1.4 km	MPC · JPL
375958	2009 WS_{178}	—	November 23, 2009	Kitt Peak	Spacewatch	·	2.4 km	MPC · JPL
375959	2009 WM_{180}	—	November 23, 2009	Kitt Peak	Spacewatch	·	3.3 km	MPC · JPL
375960	2009 WO_{195}	—	November 25, 2009	Kitt Peak	Spacewatch	·	1.7 km	MPC · JPL
375961	2009 WC_{198}	—	November 25, 2009	Catalina	CSS	·	3.2 km	MPC · JPL
375962	2009 WM_{200}	—	November 26, 2009	Mount Lemmon	Mount Lemmon Survey	·	1.7 km	MPC · JPL
375963	2009 WJ_{203}	—	November 16, 2009	Kitt Peak	Spacewatch	·	1.9 km	MPC · JPL
375964	2009 WW_{203}	—	April 22, 2007	Mount Lemmon	Mount Lemmon Survey	·	2.3 km	MPC · JPL
375965	2009 WE_{205}	—	September 24, 1992	Kitt Peak	Spacewatch	(5)	1.2 km	MPC · JPL
375966	2009 WZ_{205}	—	November 17, 2009	Kitt Peak	Spacewatch	·	2.8 km	MPC · JPL
375967	2009 WL_{208}	—	November 17, 2009	Kitt Peak	Spacewatch	·	1.2 km	MPC · JPL
375968	2009 WR_{211}	—	November 18, 2009	Kitt Peak	Spacewatch	·	1.8 km	MPC · JPL
375969	2009 WP_{212}	—	October 26, 2009	Mount Lemmon	Mount Lemmon Survey	·	2.2 km	MPC · JPL
375970	2009 WB_{216}	—	November 22, 2009	Catalina	CSS	·	1.3 km	MPC · JPL
375971	2009 WR_{217}	—	November 17, 2009	Kitt Peak	Spacewatch	(5)	1.3 km	MPC · JPL
375972	2009 WU_{217}	—	November 17, 2009	Kitt Peak	Spacewatch	·	1.9 km	MPC · JPL
375973	2009 WS_{220}	—	October 23, 2009	Kitt Peak	Spacewatch	·	1.5 km	MPC · JPL
375974	2009 WK_{223}	—	October 10, 2004	Kitt Peak	Spacewatch	·	1.6 km	MPC · JPL
375975	2009 WN_{229}	—	December 26, 2005	Mount Lemmon	Mount Lemmon Survey	·	1.3 km	MPC · JPL
375976	2009 WJ_{233}	—	November 17, 2009	Catalina	CSS	·	1.8 km	MPC · JPL
375977	2009 WB_{234}	—	November 18, 2009	Mount Lemmon	Mount Lemmon Survey	(5)	1.4 km	MPC · JPL
375978	2009 WS_{236}	—	November 10, 2009	Kitt Peak	Spacewatch	·	1.4 km	MPC · JPL
375979	2009 WU_{239}	—	November 17, 2009	Mount Lemmon	Mount Lemmon Survey	·	1.5 km	MPC · JPL
375980	2009 WA_{246}	—	November 23, 2009	Kitt Peak	Spacewatch	·	1.3 km	MPC · JPL
375981	2009 WC_{246}	—	November 23, 2009	Kitt Peak	Spacewatch	·	2.1 km	MPC · JPL
375982	2009 WG_{248}	—	November 3, 2005	Mount Lemmon	Mount Lemmon Survey	(5)	1.1 km	MPC · JPL
375983	2009 WY_{248}	—	September 8, 2000	Kitt Peak	Spacewatch	·	1.8 km	MPC · JPL
375984	2009 WZ_{251}	—	November 24, 2009	Kitt Peak	Spacewatch	AGN	1.4 km	MPC · JPL
375985	2009 WG_{257}	—	April 26, 2003	Kitt Peak	Spacewatch	·	1.7 km	MPC · JPL
375986	2009 WN_{257}	—	November 25, 2009	Kitt Peak	Spacewatch	·	2.2 km	MPC · JPL
375987	2009 WB_{263}	—	November 24, 2009	Kitt Peak	Spacewatch	NEM	2.7 km	MPC · JPL
375988	2009 WG_{264}	—	November 21, 2009	Mount Lemmon	Mount Lemmon Survey	·	2.5 km	MPC · JPL
375989	2009 XU_{3}	—	November 28, 2000	Kitt Peak	Spacewatch	MRX	1.2 km	MPC · JPL
375990	2009 XL_{6}	—	December 12, 2009	Mayhill	Lowe, A.	·	2.9 km	MPC · JPL
375991	2009 XF_{9}	—	January 31, 2006	Mount Lemmon	Mount Lemmon Survey	·	2.5 km	MPC · JPL
375992	2009 XP_{9}	—	December 12, 2009	Socorro	LINEAR	·	3.0 km	MPC · JPL
375993	2009 XS_{16}	—	December 15, 2009	Mount Lemmon	Mount Lemmon Survey	MRX	1.4 km	MPC · JPL
375994	2009 XH_{20}	—	December 15, 2009	Dauban	Kugel, F.	·	1.5 km	MPC · JPL
375995	2009 XP_{24}	—	December 10, 2009	Socorro	LINEAR	·	3.7 km	MPC · JPL
375996	2009 YM_{2}	—	December 17, 2009	Mount Lemmon	Mount Lemmon Survey	·	2.8 km	MPC · JPL
375997	2009 YD_{10}	—	December 17, 2009	Mount Lemmon	Mount Lemmon Survey	·	2.0 km	MPC · JPL
375998	2009 YU_{10}	—	December 18, 2009	Mount Lemmon	Mount Lemmon Survey	HOF	2.6 km	MPC · JPL
375999	2009 YG_{24}	—	December 17, 2009	Kitt Peak	Spacewatch	EOS	2.1 km	MPC · JPL
376000	2010 AU_{4}	—	January 4, 2010	Kitt Peak	Spacewatch	·	3.0 km	MPC · JPL

back to top

== See also ==
- Meanings of minor-planet names: 375001–376000
