= Meanings of minor-planet names: 375001–376000 =

As minor planet discoveries are confirmed, they are given a permanent number by the IAU's Minor Planet Center (MPC), and the discoverers can then submit names for them, following the IAU's naming conventions. The list below concerns those minor planets in the specified number-range that have received names, and explains the meanings of those names.

Official naming citations of newly named small Solar System bodies are approved and published in a bulletin by IAU's Working Group for Small Bodies Nomenclature (WGSBN). Before May 2021, citations were published in MPC's Minor Planet Circulars for many decades. Recent citations can also be found on the JPL Small-Body Database (SBDB). Until his death in 2016, German astronomer Lutz D. Schmadel compiled these citations into the Dictionary of Minor Planet Names (DMP) and regularly updated the collection.

Based on Paul Herget's The Names of the Minor Planets, Schmadel also researched the unclear origin of numerous asteroids, most of which had been named prior to World War II. This article incorporates text from this source, which is in the public domain: SBDB New namings may only be added to this list below after official publication as the preannouncement of names is condemned. The WGSBN publishes a comprehensive guideline for the naming rules of non-cometary small Solar System bodies.

== 375001–375100 ==
Named minor planet	Provisional	This minor planet was named for...	Ref · Catalog
375005 Newsome	2007 FM_{42}	Deb Newsome (born 1957), an amateur astronomer who lived and worked in the Gambia as a missionary at a rural literacy center for over 27 years.	JPL · 375005
375007 Buxy	2007 GQ_{5}	The town of Buxy, located in the department of Saône-et-Loire (Burgundy, France) between Chalon-sur-Saône and Le Creusot. Buxy hosts the observatory of the Society of Astronomy of Saône-et-Loire, which now houses the old telescope made by the discoverer in 1985.	JPL · 375007
375043 Zengweizhou	2007 JV_{22}	Zeng Wei-Zhou (1988–2015), a Chinese amateur astronomer.	JPL · 375043
375067 Hewins	2007 RJ_{6}	As a professor at Rutgers University, Roger Hewins (born 1940) has pioneered the use of experimental petrology to understand chondrule formation. He also studied meteorites from planetary bodies like Vesta and Mars. Hewins received the Leonard Medal of the Meteoritical Society in 2014 in Casablanca, Morocco.	IAU · 375067

== 375101–375200 ==
back to top

Named minor planet	Provisional	This minor planet was named for...	Ref · Catalog
375176 Béziau	2008 DN_{21}	Pierre Béziau (1861–1947) was a French amateur astronomer, born near the city of Angers in western France. In 1904, he built an ingenious orrery to illustrate that the orbital movements of the Earth were at the origin of climatic variations.	JPL · 375176

== 375201–375300 ==
back to top

Named minor planet	Provisional	This minor planet was named for...	Ref · Catalog
There are no named minor planets in this number range

== 375301–375400 ==
back to top

Named minor planet	Provisional	This minor planet was named for...	Ref · Catalog
375303 Ikerjiménez	2008 QU_{12}	Iker Jiménez Elizari (born 1973), Spanish television communicator on science, including archaeology and astronomy.	JPL · 375303

== 375401–375500 ==
back to top

Named minor planet	Provisional	This minor planet was named for...	Ref · Catalog
There are no named minor planets in this number range

== 375501–375600 ==
back to top

Named minor planet	Provisional	This minor planet was named for...	Ref · Catalog
There are no named minor planets in this number range

== 375601–375700 ==
back to top

Named minor planet	Provisional	This minor planet was named for...	Ref · Catalog
There are no named minor planets in this number range

== 375701–375800 ==
back to top

Named minor planet	Provisional	This minor planet was named for...	Ref · Catalog
375798 Divini	2009 TA_{4}	Eustachio Divini (c.1610–1685) was an Italian astronomer and telescope maker.	IAU · 375798

== 375801–375900 ==
back to top

Named minor planet	Provisional	This minor planet was named for...	Ref · Catalog
375832 Yurijmedvedev	2009 UH_{92}	Yurij Dmitrievich Medvedev (born 1955), the head of the Solar System Small Bodies Laboratory of the Institute of Applied Astronomy of the Russian Academy of Sciences.	JPL · 375832

== 375901–376000 ==
back to top

Named minor planet	Provisional	This minor planet was named for...	Ref · Catalog
375927 Ibara	2009 WY_{52}	Ibara, the city of in western Honshu, Japan	IAU · 375927

back to top

Preceded by 374,001–375,000	Meanings of minor-planet names List of minor planets: 375,001–376,000	Succeeded by 376,001–377,000
