= Meanings of minor-planet names: 374001–375000 =

As minor planet discoveries are confirmed, they are given a permanent number by the IAU's Minor Planet Center (MPC), and the discoverers can then submit names for them, following the IAU's naming conventions. The list below concerns those minor planets in the specified number-range that have received names, and explains the meanings of those names.

Official naming citations of newly named small Solar System bodies are approved and published in a bulletin by IAU's Working Group for Small Bodies Nomenclature (WGSBN). Before May 2021, citations were published in MPC's Minor Planet Circulars for many decades. Recent citations can also be found on the JPL Small-Body Database (SBDB). Until his death in 2016, German astronomer Lutz D. Schmadel compiled these citations into the Dictionary of Minor Planet Names (DMP) and regularly updated the collection.

Based on Paul Herget's The Names of the Minor Planets, Schmadel also researched the unclear origin of numerous asteroids, most of which had been named prior to World War II. This article incorporates text from this source, which is in the public domain: SBDB New namings may only be added to this list below after official publication as the preannouncement of names is condemned. The WGSBN publishes a comprehensive guideline for the naming rules of non-cometary small Solar System bodies.

== 374001–374100 ==
| Named minor planet | Provisional | This minor planet was named for... | Ref · Catalog |
|---|---|---|---|
There are no named minor planets in this number range

== 374101–374200 ==
back to top

| Named minor planet | Provisional | This minor planet was named for... | Ref · Catalog |
|---|---|---|---|
| 374131 Vitkauskas | 2004 TS_{115} | Vladas Vitkauskas (born 1953), Lithuanian mountaineer who became the first Lithuanian to climb Mount Everest in 1993. | IAU · 374131 |

== 374201–374300 ==
back to top

| Named minor planet | Provisional | This minor planet was named for... | Ref · Catalog |
|---|---|---|---|
There are no named minor planets in this number range

== 374301–374400 ==
back to top

| Named minor planet | Provisional | This minor planet was named for... | Ref · Catalog |
|---|---|---|---|
| 374338 Fontana | 2005 UZ_{4} | Francesco Fontana (c.1585–1656) was an Italian astronomer and telescope maker. | IAU · 374338 |
| 374354 Pesquet | 2005 UU_{158} | Thomas Pesquet (born 1978) is a French aerospace engineer, pilot and European Space Agency astronaut. From November 2016 to June 2017, Pesquet was part of Expedition 50 and Expedition 51 as a flight engineer aboard the International Space Station. | JPL · 374354 |

== 374401–374500 ==
back to top

| Named minor planet | Provisional | This minor planet was named for... | Ref · Catalog |
|---|---|---|---|
There are no named minor planets in this number range

== 374501–374600 ==
back to top

| Named minor planet | Provisional | This minor planet was named for... | Ref · Catalog |
|---|---|---|---|
There are no named minor planets in this number range

== 374601–374700 ==
back to top

| Named minor planet | Provisional | This minor planet was named for... | Ref · Catalog |
|---|---|---|---|
There are no named minor planets in this number range

== 374701–374800 ==
back to top

| Named minor planet | Provisional | This minor planet was named for... | Ref · Catalog |
|---|---|---|---|
| 374710 ʻOʻo | 2006 RJ_{110} | The ʻōʻō was a genus of birds native to the Hawaiian islands. These birds nested in tree cavities and had black plumage. The last recording of the song of the ʻōʻō was in 1987 on Kauaʻi, and it is likely extinct on all islands. | JPL · 374710 |
| 374715 Dimpourbaix | 2006 SH_{20} | Dimitri Pourbaix (1969–2021) was a Belgian astronomer, specialized in astrometry, who spearheaded the Belgian contribution to the Gaia space observatory. | IAU · 374715 |

== 374801–374900 ==
back to top

| Named minor planet | Provisional | This minor planet was named for... | Ref · Catalog |
|---|---|---|---|
| 374848 Arturomalignani | 2006 VK | Arturo Malignani (1865–1939) was an Italian inventor from Friuli. Interested in numerous sectors of industry and astronomy, he obtained patents on incandescent lamps, which were later sold to Thomas Edison. | IAU · 374848 |

== 374901–375000 ==
back to top

| Named minor planet | Provisional | This minor planet was named for... | Ref · Catalog |
|---|---|---|---|
There are no named minor planets in this number range

back to top

| Preceded by 373,001–374,000 | Meanings of minor-planet names List of minor planets: 374,001–375,000 | Succeeded by 375,001–376,000 |
