= List of minor planets: 374001–375000 =

The following is a partial list of minor planets, running from minor-planet number 374001 through 375000, inclusive. The primary data for this and other partial lists is based on JPL's "Small-Body Orbital Elements" and data available from the Minor Planet Center. Critical list information is also provided by the MPC, unless otherwise specified from Lowell Observatory. A detailed description of the table's columns and additional sources are given on the main page including a complete list of every page in this series, and a statistical break-up on the dynamical classification of minor planets.

Also see the summary list of all named bodies in numerical and alphabetical order, and the corresponding naming citations for the number range of this particular list. New namings may only be added to this list after official publication, as the preannouncement of names is condemned by the Working Group for Small Bodies Nomenclature of the International Astronomical Union.

Near-Earth obj.	MBA (inner)	MBA (outer)	Centaur
Mars-crosser	MBA (middle)	Jupiter trojan	Trans-Neptunian obj.
Unclassified

== 374001–374100 ==
Designation			Discovery			Properties		Ref
Permanent	Provisional	Named after	Date	Site	Discoverer(s)	Category	Diam.	Ref
374001	2004 BX_{121}	—	January 27, 2004	Catalina	CSS	·	4.2 km	MPC · JPL
374002	2004 BW_{128}	—	January 16, 2004	Kitt Peak	Spacewatch	·	690 m	MPC · JPL
374003	2004 BW_{161}	—	January 24, 2004	Socorro	LINEAR	·	3.4 km	MPC · JPL
374004	2004 BL_{162}	—	January 30, 2004	Anderson Mesa	LONEOS	TIR	3.6 km	MPC · JPL
374005	2004 CA_{13}	—	February 11, 2004	Palomar	NEAT	·	1.2 km	MPC · JPL
374006	2004 CT_{22}	—	February 12, 2004	Kitt Peak	Spacewatch	·	1.3 km	MPC · JPL
374007	2004 CZ_{36}	—	February 12, 2004	Palomar	NEAT	LIX	4.6 km	MPC · JPL
374008	2004 CL_{42}	—	February 10, 2004	Palomar	NEAT	·	3.1 km	MPC · JPL
374009	2004 CS_{57}	—	February 13, 2004	Palomar	NEAT	·	3.5 km	MPC · JPL
374010	2004 CH_{71}	—	February 13, 2004	Kitt Peak	Spacewatch	CYB	4.6 km	MPC · JPL
374011	2004 CX_{99}	—	February 15, 2004	Catalina	CSS	NYS	1.4 km	MPC · JPL
374012	2004 CZ_{114}	—	February 10, 2004	Palomar	NEAT	·	4.4 km	MPC · JPL
374013	2004 DP_{7}	—	February 17, 2004	Kitt Peak	Spacewatch	·	770 m	MPC · JPL
374014	2004 DB_{8}	—	February 17, 2004	Kitt Peak	Spacewatch	NYS	1.4 km	MPC · JPL
374015	2004 DW_{13}	—	February 16, 2004	Socorro	LINEAR	·	1.0 km	MPC · JPL
374016	2004 DD_{43}	—	February 23, 2004	Socorro	LINEAR	·	1.4 km	MPC · JPL
374017	2004 DZ_{48}	—	February 19, 2004	Socorro	LINEAR	·	1.5 km	MPC · JPL
374018	2004 DG_{61}	—	February 26, 2004	Socorro	LINEAR	·	1.0 km	MPC · JPL
374019	2004 DY_{65}	—	February 23, 2004	Socorro	LINEAR	·	1.1 km	MPC · JPL
374020	2004 EC_{5}	—	March 11, 2004	Palomar	NEAT	·	1.5 km	MPC · JPL
374021	2004 EP_{19}	—	March 14, 2004	Kitt Peak	Spacewatch	·	1.1 km	MPC · JPL
374022	2004 EM_{23}	—	March 14, 2004	Palomar	NEAT	H	540 m	MPC · JPL
374023	2004 EE_{43}	—	March 15, 2004	Catalina	CSS	·	1.3 km	MPC · JPL
374024	2004 EX_{45}	—	March 15, 2004	Kitt Peak	Spacewatch	CYB	3.8 km	MPC · JPL
374025	2004 EB_{62}	—	March 12, 2004	Palomar	NEAT	·	4.6 km	MPC · JPL
374026	2004 EA_{82}	—	March 15, 2004	Socorro	LINEAR	·	1.5 km	MPC · JPL
374027	2004 FS_{3}	—	March 18, 2004	Socorro	LINEAR	H	610 m	MPC · JPL
374028	2004 FN_{6}	—	March 23, 2004	Socorro	LINEAR	H	580 m	MPC · JPL
374029	2004 FJ_{9}	—	March 16, 2004	Kitt Peak	Spacewatch	·	2.6 km	MPC · JPL
374030	2004 FR_{19}	—	March 16, 2004	Kitt Peak	Spacewatch	·	1.1 km	MPC · JPL
374031	2004 FA_{47}	—	March 18, 2004	Kitt Peak	Spacewatch	·	4.1 km	MPC · JPL
374032	2004 FK_{59}	—	March 18, 2004	Socorro	LINEAR	·	4.7 km	MPC · JPL
374033	2004 FF_{111}	—	March 25, 2004	Anderson Mesa	LONEOS	·	1.8 km	MPC · JPL
374034	2004 FG_{115}	—	March 22, 2004	Socorro	LINEAR	·	1.7 km	MPC · JPL
374035	2004 FZ_{142}	—	March 27, 2004	Socorro	LINEAR	·	1.7 km	MPC · JPL
374036	2004 GH_{4}	—	March 19, 2004	Socorro	LINEAR	H	530 m	MPC · JPL
374037	2004 GO_{80}	—	January 7, 2000	Kitt Peak	Spacewatch	MAS	660 m	MPC · JPL
374038	2004 HW	—	April 18, 2004	Siding Spring	SSS	APO +1km · PHA	1.3 km	MPC · JPL
374039	2004 HP_{14}	—	April 16, 2004	Kitt Peak	Spacewatch	·	1.3 km	MPC · JPL
374040	2004 HV_{44}	—	April 21, 2004	Socorro	LINEAR	·	1.5 km	MPC · JPL
374041	2004 JB_{41}	—	May 14, 2004	Palomar	NEAT	·	1.8 km	MPC · JPL
374042	2004 KZ_{3}	—	May 16, 2004	Socorro	LINEAR	·	1.6 km	MPC · JPL
374043	2004 LH_{6}	—	June 9, 2004	Siding Spring	SSS	H	750 m	MPC · JPL
374044	2004 MU_{7}	—	June 16, 2004	Catalina	CSS	BAR	2.0 km	MPC · JPL
374045	2004 ND_{13}	—	July 11, 2004	Socorro	LINEAR	·	1.2 km	MPC · JPL
374046	2004 OV_{8}	—	June 27, 2004	Siding Spring	SSS	·	1.8 km	MPC · JPL
374047	2004 OF_{11}	—	June 27, 2004	Siding Spring	SSS	·	1.9 km	MPC · JPL
374048	2004 PJ_{3}	—	August 3, 2004	Siding Spring	SSS	·	1.6 km	MPC · JPL
374049	2004 PM_{4}	—	August 5, 2004	Palomar	NEAT	·	2.8 km	MPC · JPL
374050	2004 PK_{14}	—	August 7, 2004	Palomar	NEAT	JUN	1.4 km	MPC · JPL
374051	2004 PM_{34}	—	August 8, 2004	Anderson Mesa	LONEOS	EUN	1.5 km	MPC · JPL
374052	2004 PM_{35}	—	August 8, 2004	Anderson Mesa	LONEOS	·	2.5 km	MPC · JPL
374053	2004 PQ_{43}	—	August 6, 2004	Palomar	NEAT	·	1.7 km	MPC · JPL
374054	2004 PB_{69}	—	August 7, 2004	Palomar	NEAT	·	1.7 km	MPC · JPL
374055	2004 PY_{70}	—	August 8, 2004	Socorro	LINEAR	·	2.1 km	MPC · JPL
374056	2004 PP_{84}	—	August 10, 2004	Socorro	LINEAR	·	1.8 km	MPC · JPL
374057	2004 PN_{89}	—	August 9, 2004	Socorro	LINEAR	JUN	1.2 km	MPC · JPL
374058	2004 PU_{90}	—	August 10, 2004	Socorro	LINEAR	·	4.0 km	MPC · JPL
374059	2004 PZ_{96}	—	August 11, 2004	Socorro	LINEAR	·	2.0 km	MPC · JPL
374060	2004 PY_{104}	—	August 11, 2004	Goodricke-Pigott	Goodricke-Pigott	JUN	1.4 km	MPC · JPL
374061	2004 RY_{5}	—	August 21, 2004	Siding Spring	SSS	·	2.3 km	MPC · JPL
374062	2004 RS_{8}	—	September 6, 2004	Goodricke-Pigott	Goodricke-Pigott	·	1.9 km	MPC · JPL
374063	2004 RY_{29}	—	August 11, 2004	Socorro	LINEAR	·	1.5 km	MPC · JPL
374064	2004 RF_{33}	—	August 23, 2004	Anderson Mesa	LONEOS	·	2.2 km	MPC · JPL
374065	2004 RF_{35}	—	September 7, 2004	Socorro	LINEAR	·	3.9 km	MPC · JPL
374066	2004 RR_{47}	—	September 8, 2004	Socorro	LINEAR	·	1.8 km	MPC · JPL
374067	2004 RK_{58}	—	September 8, 2004	Socorro	LINEAR	·	1.4 km	MPC · JPL
374068	2004 RE_{70}	—	September 8, 2004	Socorro	LINEAR	·	860 m	MPC · JPL
374069	2004 RJ_{100}	—	August 10, 2004	Anderson Mesa	LONEOS	JUN	1.3 km	MPC · JPL
374070	2004 RH_{113}	—	September 6, 2004	Bergisch Gladbach	W. Bickel	·	1.7 km	MPC · JPL
374071	2004 RS_{124}	—	September 7, 2004	Kitt Peak	Spacewatch	·	2.6 km	MPC · JPL
374072	2004 RY_{127}	—	September 7, 2004	Kitt Peak	Spacewatch	·	1.5 km	MPC · JPL
374073	2004 RZ_{138}	—	September 8, 2004	Palomar	NEAT	EUN	1.7 km	MPC · JPL
374074	2004 RD_{139}	—	August 20, 2004	Catalina	CSS	·	3.0 km	MPC · JPL
374075	2004 RO_{142}	—	September 8, 2004	Socorro	LINEAR	·	2.0 km	MPC · JPL
374076	2004 RA_{146}	—	September 9, 2004	Needville	Needville	·	2.0 km	MPC · JPL
374077	2004 RD_{149}	—	September 9, 2004	Socorro	LINEAR	HNS	1.2 km	MPC · JPL
374078	2004 RB_{151}	—	September 9, 2004	Socorro	LINEAR	·	1.9 km	MPC · JPL
374079	2004 RD_{154}	—	September 10, 2004	Socorro	LINEAR	·	2.4 km	MPC · JPL
374080	2004 RA_{165}	—	September 8, 2004	Socorro	LINEAR	·	1.5 km	MPC · JPL
374081	2004 RJ_{167}	—	September 7, 2004	Socorro	LINEAR	·	1.9 km	MPC · JPL
374082	2004 RU_{168}	—	September 8, 2004	Socorro	LINEAR	EUN	1.4 km	MPC · JPL
374083	2004 RT_{181}	—	September 10, 2004	Socorro	LINEAR	·	2.2 km	MPC · JPL
374084	2004 RY_{188}	—	September 10, 2004	Socorro	LINEAR	·	2.8 km	MPC · JPL
374085	2004 RR_{199}	—	September 10, 2004	Socorro	LINEAR	·	2.6 km	MPC · JPL
374086	2004 RX_{205}	—	September 10, 2004	Socorro	LINEAR	·	2.6 km	MPC · JPL
374087	2004 RQ_{207}	—	August 20, 2004	Socorro	LINEAR	·	2.0 km	MPC · JPL
374088	2004 RK_{210}	—	September 11, 2004	Socorro	LINEAR	·	3.0 km	MPC · JPL
374089	2004 RV_{211}	—	September 11, 2004	Socorro	LINEAR	·	2.1 km	MPC · JPL
374090	2004 RX_{226}	—	September 9, 2004	Socorro	LINEAR	ADE	2.9 km	MPC · JPL
374091	2004 RT_{229}	—	September 9, 2004	Kitt Peak	Spacewatch	·	2.0 km	MPC · JPL
374092	2004 RV_{230}	—	September 9, 2004	Kitt Peak	Spacewatch	AEO	980 m	MPC · JPL
374093	2004 RX_{233}	—	September 9, 2004	Kitt Peak	Spacewatch	·	2.5 km	MPC · JPL
374094	2004 RA_{235}	—	September 10, 2004	Socorro	LINEAR	·	1.9 km	MPC · JPL
374095	2004 RM_{237}	—	September 10, 2004	Kitt Peak	Spacewatch	·	1.6 km	MPC · JPL
374096	2004 RL_{239}	—	September 10, 2004	Kitt Peak	Spacewatch	MIS	2.6 km	MPC · JPL
374097	2004 RZ_{256}	—	September 9, 2004	Socorro	LINEAR	·	1.6 km	MPC · JPL
374098	2004 RX_{259}	—	September 10, 2004	Kitt Peak	Spacewatch	NEM	1.9 km	MPC · JPL
374099	2004 RW_{270}	—	September 11, 2004	Kitt Peak	Spacewatch	·	1.5 km	MPC · JPL
374100	2004 RL_{280}	—	September 15, 2004	Kitt Peak	Spacewatch	·	1.6 km	MPC · JPL

== 374101–374200 ==
back to top

Designation			Discovery			Properties		Ref
Permanent	Provisional	Named after	Date	Site	Discoverer(s)	Category	Diam.	Ref
374101	2004 RO_{289}	—	September 10, 2004	Palomar	NEAT	·	2.1 km	MPC · JPL
374102	2004 RT_{289}	—	September 15, 2004	Socorro	LINEAR	·	3.2 km	MPC · JPL
374103	2004 RT_{291}	—	September 10, 2004	Socorro	LINEAR	·	1.7 km	MPC · JPL
374104	2004 RR_{315}	—	September 15, 2004	Siding Spring	SSS	·	1.6 km	MPC · JPL
374105	2004 RJ_{339}	—	September 15, 2004	Kitt Peak	Spacewatch	EUN	1.7 km	MPC · JPL
374106	2004 RP_{356}	—	September 12, 2004	Kitt Peak	Spacewatch	·	1.7 km	MPC · JPL
374107	2004 SE	—	September 16, 2004	Socorro	LINEAR	·	4.3 km	MPC · JPL
374108	2004 SY_{7}	—	September 17, 2004	Kitt Peak	Spacewatch	·	1.6 km	MPC · JPL
374109	2004 SZ_{23}	—	September 17, 2004	Kitt Peak	Spacewatch	·	2.4 km	MPC · JPL
374110	2004 SH_{24}	—	September 17, 2004	Kitt Peak	Spacewatch	·	1.9 km	MPC · JPL
374111	2004 SU_{28}	—	September 17, 2004	Socorro	LINEAR	·	2.2 km	MPC · JPL
374112	2004 SW_{34}	—	September 17, 2004	Socorro	LINEAR	·	2.3 km	MPC · JPL
374113	2004 SQ_{35}	—	September 17, 2004	Socorro	LINEAR	·	2.1 km	MPC · JPL
374114	2004 SP_{50}	—	October 15, 1995	Kitt Peak	Spacewatch	·	2.1 km	MPC · JPL
374115	2004 TO_{2}	—	October 4, 2004	Anderson Mesa	LONEOS	·	2.3 km	MPC · JPL
374116	2004 TG_{6}	—	August 21, 2004	Siding Spring	SSS	·	2.1 km	MPC · JPL
374117	2004 TO_{17}	—	October 10, 2004	Socorro	LINEAR	·	2.1 km	MPC · JPL
374118	2004 TR_{19}	—	October 13, 2004	Goodricke-Pigott	R. A. Tucker	·	2.8 km	MPC · JPL
374119	2004 TU_{27}	—	October 4, 2004	Kitt Peak	Spacewatch	·	1.8 km	MPC · JPL
374120	2004 TJ_{35}	—	October 4, 2004	Kitt Peak	Spacewatch	·	1.9 km	MPC · JPL
374121	2004 TN_{36}	—	October 4, 2004	Kitt Peak	Spacewatch	AEO	990 m	MPC · JPL
374122	2004 TR_{45}	—	October 4, 2004	Kitt Peak	Spacewatch	·	2.3 km	MPC · JPL
374123	2004 TP_{65}	—	October 5, 2004	Palomar	NEAT	·	3.0 km	MPC · JPL
374124	2004 TC_{69}	—	October 5, 2004	Anderson Mesa	LONEOS	·	3.0 km	MPC · JPL
374125	2004 TM_{69}	—	August 19, 2004	Siding Spring	SSS	·	2.0 km	MPC · JPL
374126	2004 TQ_{72}	—	October 6, 2004	Kitt Peak	Spacewatch	·	2.2 km	MPC · JPL
374127	2004 TO_{74}	—	October 6, 2004	Kitt Peak	Spacewatch	·	4.0 km	MPC · JPL
374128	2004 TR_{106}	—	October 7, 2004	Socorro	LINEAR	·	2.2 km	MPC · JPL
374129	2004 TY_{106}	—	October 7, 2004	Socorro	LINEAR	·	2.4 km	MPC · JPL
374130	2004 TP_{114}	—	October 8, 2004	Palomar	NEAT	·	2.1 km	MPC · JPL
374131 Vitkauskas	2004 TS_{115}	Vitkauskas	October 12, 2004	Moletai	K. Černis	·	3.2 km	MPC · JPL
374132	2004 TQ_{116}	—	October 4, 2004	Socorro	LINEAR	·	3.4 km	MPC · JPL
374133	2004 TQ_{122}	—	October 7, 2004	Anderson Mesa	LONEOS	·	2.2 km	MPC · JPL
374134	2004 TA_{125}	—	October 7, 2004	Socorro	LINEAR	·	2.1 km	MPC · JPL
374135	2004 TO_{130}	—	October 7, 2004	Socorro	LINEAR	·	1.9 km	MPC · JPL
374136	2004 TW_{132}	—	October 7, 2004	Palomar	NEAT	·	2.3 km	MPC · JPL
374137	2004 TH_{133}	—	October 7, 2004	Palomar	NEAT	·	2.7 km	MPC · JPL
374138	2004 TB_{136}	—	October 8, 2004	Anderson Mesa	LONEOS	·	2.4 km	MPC · JPL
374139	2004 TQ_{137}	—	October 8, 2004	Anderson Mesa	LONEOS	·	1.5 km	MPC · JPL
374140	2004 TP_{160}	—	October 6, 2004	Kitt Peak	Spacewatch	·	2.2 km	MPC · JPL
374141	2004 TU_{174}	—	October 9, 2004	Socorro	LINEAR	·	2.1 km	MPC · JPL
374142	2004 TB_{187}	—	September 24, 2004	Kitt Peak	Spacewatch	·	1.8 km	MPC · JPL
374143	2004 TJ_{191}	—	October 7, 2004	Kitt Peak	Spacewatch	·	1.7 km	MPC · JPL
374144	2004 TO_{204}	—	October 7, 2004	Kitt Peak	Spacewatch	·	3.5 km	MPC · JPL
374145	2004 TQ_{207}	—	October 7, 2004	Kitt Peak	Spacewatch	·	2.3 km	MPC · JPL
374146	2004 TV_{212}	—	October 8, 2004	Kitt Peak	Spacewatch	·	2.4 km	MPC · JPL
374147	2004 TY_{212}	—	October 8, 2004	Kitt Peak	Spacewatch	·	2.4 km	MPC · JPL
374148	2004 TW_{214}	—	October 9, 2004	Kitt Peak	Spacewatch	·	2.3 km	MPC · JPL
374149	2004 TL_{249}	—	October 7, 2004	Kitt Peak	Spacewatch	·	2.6 km	MPC · JPL
374150	2004 TL_{252}	—	October 9, 2004	Kitt Peak	Spacewatch	NEM	2.1 km	MPC · JPL
374151	2004 TH_{257}	—	October 9, 2004	Kitt Peak	Spacewatch	·	2.7 km	MPC · JPL
374152	2004 TA_{275}	—	October 9, 2004	Kitt Peak	Spacewatch	·	1.6 km	MPC · JPL
374153	2004 TO_{278}	—	October 9, 2004	Kitt Peak	Spacewatch	·	2.1 km	MPC · JPL
374154	2004 TD_{283}	—	October 7, 2004	Kitt Peak	Spacewatch	·	2.0 km	MPC · JPL
374155	2004 TK_{307}	—	October 10, 2004	Socorro	LINEAR	·	2.2 km	MPC · JPL
374156	2004 TL_{327}	—	October 15, 2004	Socorro	LINEAR	EUN	1.5 km	MPC · JPL
374157	2004 TL_{340}	—	October 5, 2004	Kitt Peak	Spacewatch	·	1.9 km	MPC · JPL
374158	2004 UL	—	October 18, 2004	Socorro	LINEAR	APO · PHA	660 m	MPC · JPL
374159	2004 UJ_{5}	—	October 18, 2004	Kitt Peak	M. W. Buie	·	3.3 km	MPC · JPL
374160	2004 VB_{4}	—	November 3, 2004	Palomar	NEAT	·	2.5 km	MPC · JPL
374161	2004 VZ_{7}	—	November 3, 2004	Kitt Peak	Spacewatch	·	1.6 km	MPC · JPL
374162	2004 VF_{16}	—	November 5, 2004	Anderson Mesa	LONEOS	·	3.3 km	MPC · JPL
374163	2004 VY_{19}	—	November 4, 2004	Catalina	CSS	·	2.3 km	MPC · JPL
374164	2004 VD_{29}	—	October 10, 2004	Kitt Peak	Spacewatch	·	2.8 km	MPC · JPL
374165	2004 VG_{40}	—	November 4, 2004	Kitt Peak	Spacewatch	·	2.6 km	MPC · JPL
374166	2004 VX_{46}	—	November 4, 2004	Kitt Peak	Spacewatch	GEF	2.0 km	MPC · JPL
374167	2004 VT_{53}	—	November 7, 2004	Socorro	LINEAR	·	2.5 km	MPC · JPL
374168	2004 VS_{56}	—	November 4, 2004	Catalina	CSS	·	2.7 km	MPC · JPL
374169	2004 VE_{60}	—	November 9, 2004	Catalina	CSS	PAD	2.9 km	MPC · JPL
374170	2004 VX_{65}	—	November 4, 2004	Kitt Peak	Spacewatch	AGN	1.0 km	MPC · JPL
374171	2004 VC_{75}	—	November 12, 2004	Catalina	CSS	·	2.9 km	MPC · JPL
374172	2004 VM_{82}	—	October 10, 2004	Kitt Peak	Spacewatch	·	2.4 km	MPC · JPL
374173	2004 VH_{115}	—	October 7, 2004	Kitt Peak	Spacewatch	·	1.7 km	MPC · JPL
374174	2004 WA_{8}	—	November 19, 2004	Catalina	CSS	·	2.7 km	MPC · JPL
374175	2004 XM_{4}	—	December 1, 2004	Palomar	NEAT	(18466)	2.6 km	MPC · JPL
374176	2004 XG_{12}	—	December 8, 2004	Socorro	LINEAR	·	3.1 km	MPC · JPL
374177	2004 XA_{39}	—	December 7, 2004	Socorro	LINEAR	·	2.5 km	MPC · JPL
374178	2004 XJ_{69}	—	December 10, 2004	Socorro	LINEAR	·	2.6 km	MPC · JPL
374179	2004 XQ_{76}	—	December 10, 2004	Socorro	LINEAR	·	3.3 km	MPC · JPL
374180	2004 XZ_{107}	—	December 11, 2004	Socorro	LINEAR	·	2.8 km	MPC · JPL
374181	2004 XV_{111}	—	December 9, 2004	Catalina	CSS	·	2.6 km	MPC · JPL
374182	2004 XX_{132}	—	December 14, 2004	Catalina	CSS	·	3.0 km	MPC · JPL
374183	2004 XV_{159}	—	December 14, 2004	Kitt Peak	Spacewatch	L5	10 km	MPC · JPL
374184	2004 XJ_{186}	—	December 15, 2004	Socorro	LINEAR	·	2.7 km	MPC · JPL
374185	2004 YZ_{2}	—	December 16, 2004	Anderson Mesa	LONEOS	·	3.2 km	MPC · JPL
374186	2004 YF_{20}	—	December 18, 2004	Mount Lemmon	Mount Lemmon Survey	·	3.2 km	MPC · JPL
374187	2004 YY_{32}	—	December 16, 2004	Anderson Mesa	LONEOS	·	2.0 km	MPC · JPL
374188	2005 AD_{3}	—	January 6, 2005	Socorro	LINEAR	AMO +1km	1.2 km	MPC · JPL
374189	2005 AR_{49}	—	January 13, 2005	Socorro	LINEAR	·	2.8 km	MPC · JPL
374190	2005 AN_{66}	—	January 13, 2005	Kitt Peak	Spacewatch	·	2.0 km	MPC · JPL
374191	2005 AV_{68}	—	January 13, 2005	Kitt Peak	Spacewatch	·	1.8 km	MPC · JPL
374192	2005 BF_{9}	—	January 16, 2005	Socorro	LINEAR	·	880 m	MPC · JPL
374193	2005 CZ_{29}	—	February 1, 2005	Kitt Peak	Spacewatch	·	720 m	MPC · JPL
374194	2005 CZ_{54}	—	February 4, 2005	Mount Lemmon	Mount Lemmon Survey	·	1.6 km	MPC · JPL
374195	2005 CQ_{63}	—	February 9, 2005	Kitt Peak	Spacewatch	·	3.4 km	MPC · JPL
374196	2005 EL_{26}	—	March 3, 2005	Catalina	CSS	·	3.5 km	MPC · JPL
374197	2005 EQ_{27}	—	March 3, 2005	Catalina	CSS	·	3.1 km	MPC · JPL
374198	2005 EU_{43}	—	March 3, 2005	Vail-Jarnac	Jarnac	·	780 m	MPC · JPL
374199	2005 EC_{50}	—	March 3, 2005	Catalina	CSS	·	3.9 km	MPC · JPL
374200	2005 EP_{50}	—	March 3, 2005	Catalina	CSS	TIR	3.4 km	MPC · JPL

== 374201–374300 ==
back to top

Designation			Discovery			Properties		Ref
Permanent	Provisional	Named after	Date	Site	Discoverer(s)	Category	Diam.	Ref
374201	2005 EW_{51}	—	March 3, 2005	Kitt Peak	Spacewatch	·	3.9 km	MPC · JPL
374202	2005 EQ_{74}	—	March 3, 2005	Catalina	CSS	·	4.1 km	MPC · JPL
374203	2005 EE_{84}	—	March 4, 2005	Catalina	CSS	·	860 m	MPC · JPL
374204	2005 EQ_{104}	—	March 4, 2005	Mount Lemmon	Mount Lemmon Survey	·	2.6 km	MPC · JPL
374205	2005 EU_{120}	—	March 8, 2005	Kitt Peak	Spacewatch	·	4.2 km	MPC · JPL
374206	2005 EK_{181}	—	March 9, 2005	Socorro	LINEAR	TIR	3.6 km	MPC · JPL
374207	2005 EZ_{181}	—	March 9, 2005	Socorro	LINEAR	·	950 m	MPC · JPL
374208	2005 EZ_{194}	—	March 11, 2005	Mount Lemmon	Mount Lemmon Survey	·	4.4 km	MPC · JPL
374209	2005 EW_{197}	—	March 11, 2005	Mount Lemmon	Mount Lemmon Survey	·	4.1 km	MPC · JPL
374210	2005 ED_{210}	—	March 4, 2005	Kitt Peak	Spacewatch	·	2.8 km	MPC · JPL
374211	2005 EH_{212}	—	March 4, 2005	Socorro	LINEAR	·	3.4 km	MPC · JPL
374212	2005 EK_{244}	—	March 11, 2005	Mount Lemmon	Mount Lemmon Survey	·	2.5 km	MPC · JPL
374213	2005 ER_{272}	—	March 2, 2005	Kitt Peak	Spacewatch	L5	9.2 km	MPC · JPL
374214	2005 EC_{277}	—	March 8, 2005	Mount Lemmon	Mount Lemmon Survey	·	3.6 km	MPC · JPL
374215	2005 EN_{282}	—	March 10, 2005	Mount Lemmon	Mount Lemmon Survey	·	3.4 km	MPC · JPL
374216	2005 ER_{285}	—	March 13, 2005	Kitt Peak	Spacewatch	·	2.6 km	MPC · JPL
374217	2005 EL_{292}	—	March 10, 2005	Catalina	CSS	·	4.2 km	MPC · JPL
374218	2005 EJ_{306}	—	March 4, 2005	Mount Lemmon	Mount Lemmon Survey	·	3.3 km	MPC · JPL
374219	2005 EZ_{312}	—	March 10, 2005	Kitt Peak	M. W. Buie	·	690 m	MPC · JPL
374220	2005 EP_{317}	—	March 12, 2005	Kitt Peak	M. W. Buie	·	2.3 km	MPC · JPL
374221	2005 ED_{324}	—	March 1, 2005	Kitt Peak	Spacewatch	·	1.1 km	MPC · JPL
374222	2005 EK_{324}	—	March 10, 2005	Mount Lemmon	Mount Lemmon Survey	·	3.2 km	MPC · JPL
374223	2005 FZ_{6}	—	March 30, 2005	Catalina	CSS	·	6.1 km	MPC · JPL
374224	2005 FS_{14}	—	March 16, 2005	Catalina	CSS	·	870 m	MPC · JPL
374225	2005 GK_{2}	—	April 1, 2005	Kitt Peak	Spacewatch	·	3.4 km	MPC · JPL
374226	2005 GN_{2}	—	April 1, 2005	Kitt Peak	Spacewatch	·	3.0 km	MPC · JPL
374227	2005 GM_{8}	—	April 1, 2005	Siding Spring	SSS	·	2.7 km	MPC · JPL
374228	2005 GT_{15}	—	April 2, 2005	Mount Lemmon	Mount Lemmon Survey	·	3.0 km	MPC · JPL
374229	2005 GR_{20}	—	April 2, 2005	Mount Lemmon	Mount Lemmon Survey	·	1 km	MPC · JPL
374230	2005 GE_{21}	—	April 3, 2005	Palomar	NEAT	·	3.2 km	MPC · JPL
374231	2005 GG_{26}	—	April 2, 2005	Mount Lemmon	Mount Lemmon Survey	·	3.0 km	MPC · JPL
374232	2005 GF_{27}	—	April 3, 2005	Palomar	NEAT	·	880 m	MPC · JPL
374233	2005 GJ_{33}	—	April 4, 2005	Mount Lemmon	Mount Lemmon Survey	·	2.2 km	MPC · JPL
374234	2005 GF_{34}	—	April 1, 2005	Kitt Peak	Spacewatch	·	630 m	MPC · JPL
374235	2005 GB_{40}	—	April 4, 2005	Mount Lemmon	Mount Lemmon Survey	V	550 m	MPC · JPL
374236	2005 GT_{49}	—	April 5, 2005	Mount Lemmon	Mount Lemmon Survey	·	3.7 km	MPC · JPL
374237	2005 GK_{88}	—	April 5, 2005	Mount Lemmon	Mount Lemmon Survey	·	790 m	MPC · JPL
374238	2005 GA_{97}	—	April 6, 2005	Mount Lemmon	Mount Lemmon Survey	·	840 m	MPC · JPL
374239	2005 GC_{98}	—	April 7, 2005	Mount Lemmon	Mount Lemmon Survey	·	3.0 km	MPC · JPL
374240	2005 GP_{99}	—	April 7, 2005	Kitt Peak	Spacewatch	MAS	600 m	MPC · JPL
374241	2005 GC_{108}	—	April 10, 2005	Mount Lemmon	Mount Lemmon Survey	·	2.7 km	MPC · JPL
374242	2005 GN_{108}	—	April 10, 2005	Kitt Peak	Spacewatch	·	830 m	MPC · JPL
374243	2005 GL_{122}	—	April 6, 2005	Mount Lemmon	Mount Lemmon Survey	·	3.4 km	MPC · JPL
374244	2005 GQ_{125}	—	April 10, 2005	Mount Lemmon	Mount Lemmon Survey	·	2.9 km	MPC · JPL
374245	2005 GG_{140}	—	April 13, 2005	Kitt Peak	Spacewatch	·	5.0 km	MPC · JPL
374246	2005 GU_{151}	—	March 10, 2005	Mount Lemmon	Mount Lemmon Survey	·	970 m	MPC · JPL
374247	2005 GZ_{152}	—	April 13, 2005	Anderson Mesa	LONEOS	PHO	1.0 km	MPC · JPL
374248	2005 GM_{168}	—	April 12, 2005	Kitt Peak	Spacewatch	·	4.0 km	MPC · JPL
374249	2005 GZ_{177}	—	April 15, 2005	Kitt Peak	Spacewatch	MAS	610 m	MPC · JPL
374250	2005 GT_{182}	—	March 8, 2005	Mount Lemmon	Mount Lemmon Survey	URS	3.4 km	MPC · JPL
374251	2005 GN_{200}	—	April 10, 2005	Kitt Peak	M. W. Buie	·	4.0 km	MPC · JPL
374252	2005 GR_{201}	—	April 4, 2005	Mount Lemmon	Mount Lemmon Survey	·	730 m	MPC · JPL
374253	2005 GJ_{204}	—	April 10, 2005	Mount Lemmon	Mount Lemmon Survey	·	2.9 km	MPC · JPL
374254	2005 GH_{221}	—	April 6, 2005	Kitt Peak	Spacewatch	(31811)	3.7 km	MPC · JPL
374255	2005 HK_{6}	—	April 30, 2005	Kitt Peak	Spacewatch	·	1.0 km	MPC · JPL
374256	2005 JL_{7}	—	May 4, 2005	Mauna Kea	Veillet, C.	·	3.5 km	MPC · JPL
374257	2005 JW_{30}	—	April 6, 2005	Mount Lemmon	Mount Lemmon Survey	·	3.6 km	MPC · JPL
374258	2005 JX_{37}	—	May 6, 2005	Catalina	CSS	·	1.2 km	MPC · JPL
374259	2005 JK_{38}	—	May 6, 2005	Pla D'Arguines	D'Arguines, Pla	·	3.9 km	MPC · JPL
374260	2005 JX_{52}	—	May 4, 2005	Kitt Peak	Spacewatch	·	1.1 km	MPC · JPL
374261	2005 JX_{64}	—	May 4, 2005	Kitt Peak	Spacewatch	·	620 m	MPC · JPL
374262	2005 JP_{91}	—	May 10, 2005	Mount Lemmon	Mount Lemmon Survey	·	4.5 km	MPC · JPL
374263	2005 JO_{130}	—	April 14, 2005	Catalina	CSS	·	1.1 km	MPC · JPL
374264	2005 JC_{142}	—	May 14, 2005	Mount Lemmon	Mount Lemmon Survey	NYS	1.0 km	MPC · JPL
374265	2005 JW_{177}	—	May 8, 2005	Kitt Peak	Spacewatch	NYS	1.3 km	MPC · JPL
374266	2005 LF	—	June 1, 2005	La Silla	Bourban, G., Behrend, R.	·	930 m	MPC · JPL
374267	2005 LW	—	June 2, 2005	Socorro	LINEAR	APO	590 m	MPC · JPL
374268	2005 LQ_{30}	—	June 12, 2005	Kitt Peak	Spacewatch	MAS	770 m	MPC · JPL
374269	2005 LA_{43}	—	June 13, 2005	Campo Imperatore	CINEOS	H	610 m	MPC · JPL
374270	2005 MW_{14}	—	June 29, 2005	Palomar	NEAT	·	1.3 km	MPC · JPL
374271	2005 MV_{18}	—	June 28, 2005	Palomar	NEAT	·	1.9 km	MPC · JPL
374272	2005 NS_{6}	—	July 4, 2005	Mount Lemmon	Mount Lemmon Survey	·	1.4 km	MPC · JPL
374273	2005 NL_{22}	—	July 1, 2005	Kitt Peak	Spacewatch	V	840 m	MPC · JPL
374274	2005 NF_{31}	—	July 4, 2005	Mount Lemmon	Mount Lemmon Survey	·	1.4 km	MPC · JPL
374275	2005 NS_{55}	—	July 11, 2005	Mayhill	Lowe, A.	·	1.5 km	MPC · JPL
374276	2005 NL_{62}	—	July 11, 2005	Kitt Peak	Spacewatch	·	1.6 km	MPC · JPL
374277	2005 NQ_{81}	—	July 12, 2005	Mount Lemmon	Mount Lemmon Survey	·	1.2 km	MPC · JPL
374278	2005 NL_{95}	—	June 17, 2005	Mount Lemmon	Mount Lemmon Survey	·	1.2 km	MPC · JPL
374279	2005 OO_{31}	—	July 30, 2005	Palomar	NEAT	V	790 m	MPC · JPL
374280	2005 PP_{14}	—	August 4, 2005	Palomar	NEAT	·	1.3 km	MPC · JPL
374281	2005 PE_{21}	—	August 12, 2005	Kingsnake	J. V. McClusky	·	1.1 km	MPC · JPL
374282	2005 QK_{15}	—	August 25, 2005	Palomar	NEAT	·	1.1 km	MPC · JPL
374283	2005 QF_{43}	—	August 26, 2005	Palomar	NEAT	T_{j} (2.98) · 3:2	5.8 km	MPC · JPL
374284	2005 QT_{53}	—	August 28, 2005	Kitt Peak	Spacewatch	·	1.2 km	MPC · JPL
374285	2005 QW_{60}	—	August 26, 2005	Palomar	NEAT	·	1.2 km	MPC · JPL
374286	2005 QB_{72}	—	August 29, 2005	Anderson Mesa	LONEOS	·	1.5 km	MPC · JPL
374287	2005 QT_{87}	—	August 27, 2005	Bergisch Gladbach	W. Bickel	·	1.7 km	MPC · JPL
374288	2005 QE_{88}	—	August 29, 2005	Kitt Peak	Spacewatch	T_{j} (2.98) · 3:2	3.6 km	MPC · JPL
374289	2005 QU_{104}	—	August 27, 2005	Palomar	NEAT	·	1.6 km	MPC · JPL
374290	2005 QQ_{122}	—	August 28, 2005	Kitt Peak	Spacewatch	·	1.1 km	MPC · JPL
374291	2005 QS_{148}	—	August 30, 2005	Anderson Mesa	LONEOS	·	1.4 km	MPC · JPL
374292	2005 RA_{1}	—	September 2, 2005	Palomar	NEAT	H	690 m	MPC · JPL
374293	2005 SR_{15}	—	September 26, 2005	Kitt Peak	Spacewatch	3:2 · SHU	5.4 km	MPC · JPL
374294	2005 SY_{32}	—	September 23, 2005	Kitt Peak	Spacewatch	·	1.7 km	MPC · JPL
374295	2005 SD_{38}	—	September 24, 2005	Kitt Peak	Spacewatch	MAS	830 m	MPC · JPL
374296	2005 SX_{41}	—	September 24, 2005	Kitt Peak	Spacewatch	·	1.6 km	MPC · JPL
374297	2005 SD_{49}	—	September 24, 2005	Kitt Peak	Spacewatch	·	900 m	MPC · JPL
374298	2005 SS_{61}	—	September 26, 2005	Kitt Peak	Spacewatch	·	1.5 km	MPC · JPL
374299	2005 SC_{79}	—	September 24, 2005	Kitt Peak	Spacewatch	NYS	1.1 km	MPC · JPL
374300	2005 SW_{98}	—	September 25, 2005	Kitt Peak	Spacewatch	RAF	740 m	MPC · JPL

== 374301–374400 ==
back to top

Designation			Discovery			Properties		Ref
Permanent	Provisional	Named after	Date	Site	Discoverer(s)	Category	Diam.	Ref
374301	2005 SR_{139}	—	September 25, 2005	Kitt Peak	Spacewatch	·	1.3 km	MPC · JPL
374302	2005 SB_{150}	—	September 25, 2005	Kitt Peak	Spacewatch	·	1.6 km	MPC · JPL
374303	2005 SH_{150}	—	September 25, 2005	Kitt Peak	Spacewatch	·	840 m	MPC · JPL
374304	2005 SZ_{152}	—	September 25, 2005	Kitt Peak	Spacewatch	ADE	2.0 km	MPC · JPL
374305	2005 SE_{154}	—	September 26, 2005	Kitt Peak	Spacewatch	·	890 m	MPC · JPL
374306	2005 SL_{155}	—	September 26, 2005	Catalina	CSS	H	670 m	MPC · JPL
374307	2005 SB_{164}	—	September 27, 2005	Palomar	NEAT	·	950 m	MPC · JPL
374308	2005 SX_{175}	—	September 29, 2005	Kitt Peak	Spacewatch	·	1.4 km	MPC · JPL
374309	2005 SC_{188}	—	September 29, 2005	Mount Lemmon	Mount Lemmon Survey	KON	2.2 km	MPC · JPL
374310	2005 SG_{198}	—	September 30, 2005	Mount Lemmon	Mount Lemmon Survey	H	440 m	MPC · JPL
374311	2005 SP_{221}	—	September 30, 2005	Mount Lemmon	Mount Lemmon Survey	·	850 m	MPC · JPL
374312	2005 SV_{226}	—	September 30, 2005	Kitt Peak	Spacewatch	·	850 m	MPC · JPL
374313	2005 SL_{229}	—	September 14, 2005	Kitt Peak	Spacewatch	·	850 m	MPC · JPL
374314	2005 SC_{238}	—	September 29, 2005	Kitt Peak	Spacewatch	·	1.2 km	MPC · JPL
374315	2005 SN_{246}	—	September 30, 2005	Kitt Peak	Spacewatch	·	1.3 km	MPC · JPL
374316	2005 SU_{259}	—	September 25, 2005	Catalina	CSS	·	1.1 km	MPC · JPL
374317	2005 SJ_{279}	—	September 30, 2005	Mount Lemmon	Mount Lemmon Survey	·	1.2 km	MPC · JPL
374318	2005 SG_{286}	—	September 13, 2005	Kitt Peak	Spacewatch	3:2	4.7 km	MPC · JPL
374319	2005 TO_{6}	—	October 1, 2005	Catalina	CSS	·	1.1 km	MPC · JPL
374320	2005 TG_{7}	—	October 1, 2005	Catalina	CSS	·	2.2 km	MPC · JPL
374321	2005 TW_{16}	—	October 1, 2005	Socorro	LINEAR	·	1.4 km	MPC · JPL
374322	2005 TQ_{17}	—	October 1, 2005	Mount Lemmon	Mount Lemmon Survey	·	1.0 km	MPC · JPL
374323	2005 TO_{38}	—	October 1, 2005	Mount Lemmon	Mount Lemmon Survey	·	860 m	MPC · JPL
374324	2005 TT_{54}	—	October 2, 2005	Mount Lemmon	Mount Lemmon Survey	EUN	1.0 km	MPC · JPL
374325	2005 TL_{62}	—	October 4, 2005	Mount Lemmon	Mount Lemmon Survey	(5)	1.1 km	MPC · JPL
374326	2005 TN_{64}	—	October 6, 2005	Mount Lemmon	Mount Lemmon Survey	·	840 m	MPC · JPL
374327	2005 TU_{69}	—	October 6, 2005	Kitt Peak	Spacewatch	·	930 m	MPC · JPL
374328	2005 TV_{80}	—	October 3, 2005	Kitt Peak	Spacewatch	·	740 m	MPC · JPL
374329	2005 TZ_{93}	—	September 24, 2005	Kitt Peak	Spacewatch	·	1.1 km	MPC · JPL
374330	2005 TO_{117}	—	October 7, 2005	Kitt Peak	Spacewatch	·	2.1 km	MPC · JPL
374331	2005 TH_{120}	—	September 26, 2005	Kitt Peak	Spacewatch	3:2 · SHU	6.2 km	MPC · JPL
374332	2005 TF_{125}	—	October 7, 2005	Kitt Peak	Spacewatch	·	1.3 km	MPC · JPL
374333	2005 TJ_{128}	—	October 7, 2005	Kitt Peak	Spacewatch	·	1.5 km	MPC · JPL
374334	2005 TJ_{129}	—	October 7, 2005	Kitt Peak	Spacewatch	·	1.9 km	MPC · JPL
374335	2005 TT_{134}	—	October 5, 2005	Kitt Peak	Spacewatch	·	950 m	MPC · JPL
374336	2005 TG_{171}	—	October 10, 2005	Anderson Mesa	LONEOS	·	1.5 km	MPC · JPL
374337	2005 TV_{190}	—	October 7, 2005	Anderson Mesa	LONEOS	H	610 m	MPC · JPL
374338 Fontana	2005 UZ_{4}	Fontana	October 25, 2005	Vallemare Borbona	V. S. Casulli	·	1.1 km	MPC · JPL
374339	2005 UP_{6}	—	October 28, 2005	Socorro	LINEAR	H	680 m	MPC · JPL
374340	2005 US_{11}	—	October 22, 2005	Kitt Peak	Spacewatch	·	1.2 km	MPC · JPL
374341	2005 UW_{57}	—	October 24, 2005	Kitt Peak	Spacewatch	·	1.0 km	MPC · JPL
374342	2005 UY_{61}	—	October 25, 2005	Mount Lemmon	Mount Lemmon Survey	·	1.4 km	MPC · JPL
374343	2005 UO_{73}	—	October 23, 2005	Palomar	NEAT	HNS	1.4 km	MPC · JPL
374344	2005 UN_{92}	—	October 22, 2005	Kitt Peak	Spacewatch	(5)	1.2 km	MPC · JPL
374345	2005 US_{93}	—	October 22, 2005	Kitt Peak	Spacewatch	·	930 m	MPC · JPL
374346	2005 UB_{104}	—	October 22, 2005	Kitt Peak	Spacewatch	(5)	1.0 km	MPC · JPL
374347	2005 UF_{126}	—	October 24, 2005	Kitt Peak	Spacewatch	·	1.6 km	MPC · JPL
374348	2005 US_{132}	—	October 24, 2005	Palomar	NEAT	EUN	1.4 km	MPC · JPL
374349	2005 UN_{148}	—	October 26, 2005	Kitt Peak	Spacewatch	·	890 m	MPC · JPL
374350	2005 UH_{155}	—	October 26, 2005	Kitt Peak	Spacewatch	·	3.5 km	MPC · JPL
374351	2005 US_{155}	—	October 26, 2005	Palomar	NEAT	·	1.0 km	MPC · JPL
374352	2005 UK_{156}	—	October 31, 2005	Socorro	LINEAR	H	670 m	MPC · JPL
374353	2005 UO_{156}	—	October 28, 2005	Junk Bond	D. Healy	EUN	1.3 km	MPC · JPL
374354 Pesquet	2005 UU_{158}	Pesquet	October 30, 2005	Nogales	J.-C. Merlin	·	1.1 km	MPC · JPL
374355	2005 UT_{163}	—	October 24, 2005	Kitt Peak	Spacewatch	·	1.1 km	MPC · JPL
374356	2005 UT_{176}	—	October 24, 2005	Kitt Peak	Spacewatch	·	1.9 km	MPC · JPL
374357	2005 UV_{181}	—	October 24, 2005	Kitt Peak	Spacewatch	·	1.4 km	MPC · JPL
374358	2005 UM_{198}	—	October 25, 2005	Kitt Peak	Spacewatch	·	1.1 km	MPC · JPL
374359	2005 UL_{200}	—	October 25, 2005	Kitt Peak	Spacewatch	·	1.4 km	MPC · JPL
374360	2005 UN_{212}	—	October 27, 2005	Kitt Peak	Spacewatch	·	3.9 km	MPC · JPL
374361	2005 US_{217}	—	October 22, 2005	Kitt Peak	Spacewatch	·	1.6 km	MPC · JPL
374362	2005 UR_{232}	—	October 25, 2005	Mount Lemmon	Mount Lemmon Survey	EUN	980 m	MPC · JPL
374363	2005 UB_{236}	—	October 25, 2005	Kitt Peak	Spacewatch	·	2.2 km	MPC · JPL
374364	2005 UB_{242}	—	October 25, 2005	Kitt Peak	Spacewatch	·	1.4 km	MPC · JPL
374365	2005 UN_{292}	—	October 26, 2005	Kitt Peak	Spacewatch	·	2.3 km	MPC · JPL
374366	2005 UO_{293}	—	October 26, 2005	Kitt Peak	Spacewatch	·	1.2 km	MPC · JPL
374367	2005 US_{295}	—	October 26, 2005	Kitt Peak	Spacewatch	·	870 m	MPC · JPL
374368	2005 UU_{302}	—	October 26, 2005	Kitt Peak	Spacewatch	·	1.5 km	MPC · JPL
374369	2005 UE_{312}	—	October 29, 2005	Mount Lemmon	Mount Lemmon Survey	·	1.4 km	MPC · JPL
374370	2005 UU_{322}	—	October 28, 2005	Catalina	CSS	·	930 m	MPC · JPL
374371	2005 UH_{331}	—	October 29, 2005	Mount Lemmon	Mount Lemmon Survey	·	930 m	MPC · JPL
374372	2005 UV_{343}	—	October 29, 2005	Kitt Peak	Spacewatch	·	1.2 km	MPC · JPL
374373	2005 UK_{361}	—	October 27, 2005	Kitt Peak	Spacewatch	(5)	1.0 km	MPC · JPL
374374	2005 UN_{362}	—	October 27, 2005	Kitt Peak	Spacewatch	EUN	1.1 km	MPC · JPL
374375	2005 UY_{367}	—	October 27, 2005	Kitt Peak	Spacewatch	·	1.1 km	MPC · JPL
374376	2005 UV_{382}	—	October 27, 2005	Kitt Peak	Spacewatch	·	2.0 km	MPC · JPL
374377	2005 UM_{387}	—	October 30, 2005	Mount Lemmon	Mount Lemmon Survey	EUN	1.0 km	MPC · JPL
374378	2005 UM_{400}	—	October 26, 2005	Kitt Peak	Spacewatch	·	1.5 km	MPC · JPL
374379	2005 UD_{405}	—	October 29, 2005	Mount Lemmon	Mount Lemmon Survey	·	1.1 km	MPC · JPL
374380	2005 UR_{425}	—	October 28, 2005	Kitt Peak	Spacewatch	·	690 m	MPC · JPL
374381	2005 UQ_{432}	—	October 28, 2005	Kitt Peak	Spacewatch	·	1.2 km	MPC · JPL
374382	2005 UA_{434}	—	October 29, 2005	Kitt Peak	Spacewatch	HIL · 3:2	5.5 km	MPC · JPL
374383	2005 UC_{448}	—	October 30, 2005	Socorro	LINEAR	·	1.5 km	MPC · JPL
374384	2005 UG_{468}	—	October 30, 2005	Kitt Peak	Spacewatch	·	1.7 km	MPC · JPL
374385	2005 UO_{476}	—	October 24, 2005	Kitt Peak	Spacewatch	·	1.6 km	MPC · JPL
374386	2005 UN_{478}	—	October 27, 2005	Mount Lemmon	Mount Lemmon Survey	·	1.1 km	MPC · JPL
374387	2005 UG_{479}	—	October 29, 2005	Catalina	CSS	BRG	1.3 km	MPC · JPL
374388	2005 UW_{481}	—	October 31, 2005	Palomar	NEAT	·	1.2 km	MPC · JPL
374389	2005 UV_{520}	—	October 26, 2005	Apache Point	A. C. Becker	·	1.1 km	MPC · JPL
374390	2005 UQ_{527}	—	October 25, 2005	Catalina	CSS	·	2.7 km	MPC · JPL
374391	2005 UU_{529}	—	October 31, 2005	Mount Lemmon	Mount Lemmon Survey	·	2.6 km	MPC · JPL
374392	2005 VA_{3}	—	November 3, 2005	Mount Lemmon	Mount Lemmon Survey	·	1.0 km	MPC · JPL
374393	2005 VW_{13}	—	November 3, 2005	Catalina	CSS	(5)	980 m	MPC · JPL
374394	2005 VQ_{14}	—	November 3, 2005	Mount Lemmon	Mount Lemmon Survey	·	930 m	MPC · JPL
374395	2005 VE_{41}	—	November 4, 2005	Mount Lemmon	Mount Lemmon Survey	·	1.5 km	MPC · JPL
374396	2005 VC_{48}	—	November 5, 2005	Kitt Peak	Spacewatch	·	960 m	MPC · JPL
374397	2005 VN_{58}	—	November 5, 2005	Kitt Peak	Spacewatch	·	1.4 km	MPC · JPL
374398	2005 VE_{79}	—	November 3, 2005	Mount Lemmon	Mount Lemmon Survey	·	1.1 km	MPC · JPL
374399	2005 VA_{97}	—	November 5, 2005	Kitt Peak	Spacewatch	·	1.1 km	MPC · JPL
374400	2005 VZ_{97}	—	November 5, 2005	Catalina	CSS	·	3.8 km	MPC · JPL

== 374401–374500 ==
back to top

Designation			Discovery			Properties		Ref
Permanent	Provisional	Named after	Date	Site	Discoverer(s)	Category	Diam.	Ref
374401	2005 VW_{105}	—	October 25, 2005	Kitt Peak	Spacewatch	·	1.4 km	MPC · JPL
374402	2005 VB_{126}	—	November 1, 2005	Apache Point	A. C. Becker	·	710 m	MPC · JPL
374403	2005 VK_{131}	—	October 22, 2005	Catalina	CSS	·	1.2 km	MPC · JPL
374404	2005 WM	—	November 20, 2005	Wrightwood	J. W. Young	·	1.8 km	MPC · JPL
374405	2005 WL_{3}	—	November 21, 2005	Anderson Mesa	LONEOS	·	2.1 km	MPC · JPL
374406	2005 WN_{25}	—	November 21, 2005	Kitt Peak	Spacewatch	·	2.1 km	MPC · JPL
374407	2005 WO_{26}	—	November 21, 2005	Kitt Peak	Spacewatch	·	2.0 km	MPC · JPL
374408	2005 WW_{29}	—	November 21, 2005	Kitt Peak	Spacewatch	·	1.2 km	MPC · JPL
374409	2005 WK_{34}	—	November 21, 2005	Catalina	CSS	·	1.5 km	MPC · JPL
374410	2005 WM_{39}	—	November 25, 2005	Mount Lemmon	Mount Lemmon Survey	·	2.4 km	MPC · JPL
374411	2005 WJ_{45}	—	November 22, 2005	Kitt Peak	Spacewatch	·	1.0 km	MPC · JPL
374412	2005 WY_{48}	—	November 25, 2005	Kitt Peak	Spacewatch	(5)	1.9 km	MPC · JPL
374413	2005 WW_{49}	—	November 25, 2005	Mount Lemmon	Mount Lemmon Survey	·	1.1 km	MPC · JPL
374414	2005 WL_{50}	—	November 25, 2005	Mount Lemmon	Mount Lemmon Survey	·	1.2 km	MPC · JPL
374415	2005 WJ_{53}	—	November 25, 2005	Mount Lemmon	Mount Lemmon Survey	·	1.3 km	MPC · JPL
374416	2005 WN_{62}	—	November 25, 2005	Catalina	CSS	·	1.1 km	MPC · JPL
374417	2005 WR_{62}	—	November 25, 2005	Catalina	CSS	·	1.1 km	MPC · JPL
374418	2005 WZ_{66}	—	November 22, 2005	Kitt Peak	Spacewatch	·	1.4 km	MPC · JPL
374419	2005 WB_{69}	—	November 25, 2005	Mount Lemmon	Mount Lemmon Survey	·	2.9 km	MPC · JPL
374420	2005 WS_{69}	—	November 26, 2005	Kitt Peak	Spacewatch	·	1.3 km	MPC · JPL
374421	2005 WG_{74}	—	November 26, 2005	Catalina	CSS	H	930 m	MPC · JPL
374422	2005 WB_{85}	—	November 28, 2005	Mount Lemmon	Mount Lemmon Survey	·	920 m	MPC · JPL
374423	2005 WX_{109}	—	November 30, 2005	Kitt Peak	Spacewatch	·	1.0 km	MPC · JPL
374424	2005 WA_{111}	—	November 30, 2005	Kitt Peak	Spacewatch	·	1.3 km	MPC · JPL
374425	2005 WK_{113}	—	November 25, 2005	Catalina	CSS	·	1.1 km	MPC · JPL
374426	2005 WK_{116}	—	November 30, 2005	Socorro	LINEAR	·	1.3 km	MPC · JPL
374427	2005 WU_{116}	—	November 30, 2005	Mount Lemmon	Mount Lemmon Survey	·	2.6 km	MPC · JPL
374428	2005 WX_{126}	—	November 25, 2005	Catalina	CSS	·	1.2 km	MPC · JPL
374429	2005 WA_{138}	—	November 3, 2005	Kitt Peak	Spacewatch	·	990 m	MPC · JPL
374430	2005 WK_{142}	—	November 29, 2005	Kitt Peak	Spacewatch	·	1.3 km	MPC · JPL
374431	2005 WW_{150}	—	November 28, 2005	Socorro	LINEAR	(5)	1.3 km	MPC · JPL
374432	2005 WC_{155}	—	November 29, 2005	Kitt Peak	Spacewatch	·	1.3 km	MPC · JPL
374433	2005 WV_{158}	—	November 29, 2005	Mount Lemmon	Mount Lemmon Survey	·	2.4 km	MPC · JPL
374434	2005 WZ_{158}	—	November 28, 2005	Palomar	NEAT	·	1.6 km	MPC · JPL
374435	2005 WM_{163}	—	November 29, 2005	Mount Lemmon	Mount Lemmon Survey	3:2	5.7 km	MPC · JPL
374436	2005 WM_{165}	—	November 29, 2005	Mount Lemmon	Mount Lemmon Survey	MIS	3.2 km	MPC · JPL
374437	2005 WA_{168}	—	November 30, 2005	Kitt Peak	Spacewatch	·	1.3 km	MPC · JPL
374438	2005 WQ_{176}	—	November 30, 2005	Kitt Peak	Spacewatch	EUN	1.7 km	MPC · JPL
374439	2005 WV_{176}	—	November 30, 2005	Kitt Peak	Spacewatch	(5)	1.1 km	MPC · JPL
374440	2005 WP_{177}	—	November 30, 2005	Kitt Peak	Spacewatch	NEM	2.4 km	MPC · JPL
374441	2005 WG_{185}	—	November 29, 2005	Socorro	LINEAR	H	660 m	MPC · JPL
374442	2005 WT_{186}	—	November 29, 2005	Kitt Peak	Spacewatch	(5)	1.0 km	MPC · JPL
374443	2005 WC_{188}	—	November 30, 2005	Kitt Peak	Spacewatch	(5)	2.1 km	MPC · JPL
374444	2005 WJ_{195}	—	November 28, 2005	Socorro	LINEAR	(5)	1.5 km	MPC · JPL
374445	2005 WW_{195}	—	November 25, 2005	Mount Lemmon	Mount Lemmon Survey	·	1.9 km	MPC · JPL
374446	2005 WP_{207}	—	November 21, 2005	Catalina	CSS	·	1.8 km	MPC · JPL
374447	2005 WM_{208}	—	November 28, 2005	Kitt Peak	Spacewatch	·	1.1 km	MPC · JPL
374448	2005 WP_{211}	—	November 30, 2005	Kitt Peak	Spacewatch	·	1.2 km	MPC · JPL
374449	2005 XD_{1}	—	December 4, 2005	Catalina	CSS	AMO	410 m	MPC · JPL
374450	2005 XD_{2}	—	November 6, 2005	Mount Lemmon	Mount Lemmon Survey	MAR	1.4 km	MPC · JPL
374451	2005 XF_{4}	—	December 1, 2005	Mount Lemmon	Mount Lemmon Survey	·	1.3 km	MPC · JPL
374452	2005 XP_{5}	—	December 1, 2005	Anderson Mesa	LONEOS	H	880 m	MPC · JPL
374453	2005 XT_{8}	—	December 1, 2005	Kitt Peak	Spacewatch	3:2 · SHU	5.2 km	MPC · JPL
374454	2005 XK_{14}	—	December 1, 2005	Kitt Peak	Spacewatch	·	1.9 km	MPC · JPL
374455	2005 XM_{16}	—	December 1, 2005	Mount Lemmon	Mount Lemmon Survey	EUN	1.5 km	MPC · JPL
374456	2005 XN_{26}	—	December 4, 2005	Mount Lemmon	Mount Lemmon Survey	·	1.5 km	MPC · JPL
374457	2005 XE_{28}	—	December 1, 2005	Socorro	LINEAR	·	1.4 km	MPC · JPL
374458	2005 XF_{29}	—	December 2, 2005	Catalina	CSS	·	1.8 km	MPC · JPL
374459	2005 XA_{42}	—	December 4, 2005	Kitt Peak	Spacewatch	·	1.6 km	MPC · JPL
374460	2005 XU_{43}	—	December 2, 2005	Kitt Peak	Spacewatch	(5) · fast	1.2 km	MPC · JPL
374461	2005 XW_{49}	—	December 2, 2005	Kitt Peak	Spacewatch	·	1.5 km	MPC · JPL
374462	2005 XJ_{53}	—	December 4, 2005	Kitt Peak	Spacewatch	·	1.2 km	MPC · JPL
374463	2005 XO_{54}	—	December 5, 2005	Kitt Peak	Spacewatch	·	1.3 km	MPC · JPL
374464	2005 XN_{59}	—	December 3, 2005	Kitt Peak	Spacewatch	·	1.5 km	MPC · JPL
374465	2005 XZ_{63}	—	December 6, 2005	Socorro	LINEAR	·	1.3 km	MPC · JPL
374466	2005 XD_{71}	—	November 28, 2005	Kitt Peak	Spacewatch	·	2.0 km	MPC · JPL
374467	2005 XO_{82}	—	December 10, 2005	Kitt Peak	Spacewatch	(5)	1.3 km	MPC · JPL
374468	2005 XJ_{83}	—	December 2, 2005	Socorro	LINEAR	(5)	1.2 km	MPC · JPL
374469	2005 XV_{83}	—	December 6, 2005	Anderson Mesa	LONEOS	ADE	3.8 km	MPC · JPL
374470	2005 XN_{88}	—	December 5, 2005	Kitt Peak	Spacewatch	·	1.3 km	MPC · JPL
374471	2005 YR_{10}	—	December 21, 2005	Kitt Peak	Spacewatch	·	1.8 km	MPC · JPL
374472	2005 YB_{16}	—	December 22, 2005	Kitt Peak	Spacewatch	·	1.8 km	MPC · JPL
374473	2005 YK_{20}	—	December 24, 2005	Kitt Peak	Spacewatch	·	1.3 km	MPC · JPL
374474	2005 YG_{30}	—	December 21, 2005	Kitt Peak	Spacewatch	(5)	1.2 km	MPC · JPL
374475	2005 YY_{31}	—	December 22, 2005	Kitt Peak	Spacewatch	·	1.6 km	MPC · JPL
374476	2005 YX_{34}	—	December 24, 2005	Kitt Peak	Spacewatch	·	2.1 km	MPC · JPL
374477	2005 YJ_{39}	—	December 25, 2005	Anderson Mesa	LONEOS	(5)	1.5 km	MPC · JPL
374478	2005 YB_{40}	—	December 22, 2005	Kitt Peak	Spacewatch	·	2.9 km	MPC · JPL
374479	2005 YK_{46}	—	December 25, 2005	Kitt Peak	Spacewatch	ADE	2.2 km	MPC · JPL
374480	2005 YO_{46}	—	December 25, 2005	Kitt Peak	Spacewatch	·	2.1 km	MPC · JPL
374481	2005 YG_{51}	—	December 25, 2005	Mount Lemmon	Mount Lemmon Survey	·	2.5 km	MPC · JPL
374482	2005 YM_{55}	—	December 27, 2005	Siding Spring	SSS	·	1.3 km	MPC · JPL
374483	2005 YV_{57}	—	December 24, 2005	Kitt Peak	Spacewatch	·	1.7 km	MPC · JPL
374484	2005 YH_{59}	—	December 26, 2005	Kitt Peak	Spacewatch	·	2.1 km	MPC · JPL
374485	2005 YO_{74}	—	December 24, 2005	Kitt Peak	Spacewatch	·	830 m	MPC · JPL
374486	2005 YT_{79}	—	December 24, 2005	Kitt Peak	Spacewatch	·	1.2 km	MPC · JPL
374487	2005 YG_{90}	—	December 26, 2005	Mount Lemmon	Mount Lemmon Survey	·	2.1 km	MPC · JPL
374488	2005 YO_{90}	—	December 26, 2005	Mount Lemmon	Mount Lemmon Survey	·	2.3 km	MPC · JPL
374489	2005 YJ_{93}	—	December 27, 2005	Kitt Peak	Spacewatch	·	2.0 km	MPC · JPL
374490	2005 YH_{95}	—	December 25, 2005	Kitt Peak	Spacewatch	·	1.6 km	MPC · JPL
374491	2005 YM_{95}	—	December 25, 2005	Kitt Peak	Spacewatch	·	1.2 km	MPC · JPL
374492	2005 YN_{97}	—	December 24, 2005	Kitt Peak	Spacewatch	·	2.0 km	MPC · JPL
374493	2005 YJ_{98}	—	December 25, 2005	Kitt Peak	Spacewatch	·	1.1 km	MPC · JPL
374494	2005 YP_{104}	—	December 25, 2005	Kitt Peak	Spacewatch	·	950 m	MPC · JPL
374495	2005 YY_{112}	—	December 25, 2005	Mount Lemmon	Mount Lemmon Survey	·	1.4 km	MPC · JPL
374496	2005 YG_{114}	—	December 25, 2005	Kitt Peak	Spacewatch	·	1.5 km	MPC · JPL
374497	2005 YZ_{114}	—	December 25, 2005	Kitt Peak	Spacewatch	·	1.3 km	MPC · JPL
374498	2005 YF_{136}	—	December 26, 2005	Kitt Peak	Spacewatch	·	1.9 km	MPC · JPL
374499	2005 YW_{153}	—	December 29, 2005	Socorro	LINEAR	·	1.4 km	MPC · JPL
374500	2005 YH_{154}	—	December 29, 2005	Mount Lemmon	Mount Lemmon Survey	·	2.5 km	MPC · JPL

== 374501–374600 ==
back to top

Designation			Discovery			Properties		Ref
Permanent	Provisional	Named after	Date	Site	Discoverer(s)	Category	Diam.	Ref
374501	2005 YN_{154}	—	December 29, 2005	Socorro	LINEAR	·	1.5 km	MPC · JPL
374502	2005 YS_{164}	—	December 29, 2005	Socorro	LINEAR	(5)	1.2 km	MPC · JPL
374503	2005 YY_{170}	—	December 29, 2005	Socorro	LINEAR	MAR	1.2 km	MPC · JPL
374504	2005 YU_{174}	—	December 29, 2005	Palomar	NEAT	·	2.7 km	MPC · JPL
374505	2005 YJ_{188}	—	December 28, 2005	Mount Lemmon	Mount Lemmon Survey	·	2.7 km	MPC · JPL
374506	2005 YJ_{189}	—	December 29, 2005	Kitt Peak	Spacewatch	·	2.1 km	MPC · JPL
374507	2005 YY_{195}	—	December 22, 2005	Catalina	CSS	HNS	2.6 km	MPC · JPL
374508	2005 YD_{201}	—	December 22, 2005	Kitt Peak	Spacewatch	·	1.9 km	MPC · JPL
374509	2005 YP_{204}	—	December 25, 2005	Mount Lemmon	Mount Lemmon Survey	WIT	1.0 km	MPC · JPL
374510	2005 YF_{205}	—	December 26, 2005	Kitt Peak	Spacewatch	·	1.5 km	MPC · JPL
374511	2005 YG_{205}	—	December 26, 2005	Kitt Peak	Spacewatch	·	1.8 km	MPC · JPL
374512	2005 YU_{217}	—	December 31, 2005	Kitt Peak	Spacewatch	·	1.9 km	MPC · JPL
374513	2005 YX_{236}	—	December 28, 2005	Kitt Peak	Spacewatch	·	1.7 km	MPC · JPL
374514	2005 YH_{237}	—	December 28, 2005	Kitt Peak	Spacewatch	·	2.8 km	MPC · JPL
374515	2005 YM_{245}	—	December 30, 2005	Mount Lemmon	Mount Lemmon Survey	·	2.2 km	MPC · JPL
374516	2005 YH_{251}	—	December 28, 2005	Kitt Peak	Spacewatch	·	2.2 km	MPC · JPL
374517	2005 YC_{265}	—	December 25, 2005	Kitt Peak	Spacewatch	·	1.9 km	MPC · JPL
374518	2005 YG_{268}	—	December 25, 2005	Mount Lemmon	Mount Lemmon Survey	EUN	1.3 km	MPC · JPL
374519	2005 YO_{269}	—	December 25, 2005	Mount Lemmon	Mount Lemmon Survey	·	2.0 km	MPC · JPL
374520	2005 YC_{292}	—	December 28, 2005	Kitt Peak	Spacewatch	·	1.7 km	MPC · JPL
374521	2006 AE_{10}	—	January 4, 2006	Kitt Peak	Spacewatch	·	2.8 km	MPC · JPL
374522	2006 AV_{13}	—	January 5, 2006	Mount Lemmon	Mount Lemmon Survey	·	3.7 km	MPC · JPL
374523	2006 AN_{14}	—	January 5, 2006	Mount Lemmon	Mount Lemmon Survey	·	2.0 km	MPC · JPL
374524	2006 AM_{15}	—	January 5, 2006	Mount Lemmon	Mount Lemmon Survey	·	2.1 km	MPC · JPL
374525	2006 AM_{32}	—	January 5, 2006	Catalina	CSS	·	2.6 km	MPC · JPL
374526	2006 AY_{41}	—	January 5, 2006	Kitt Peak	Spacewatch	·	1.5 km	MPC · JPL
374527	2006 AJ_{47}	—	December 25, 2005	Kitt Peak	Spacewatch	EUN	1.4 km	MPC · JPL
374528	2006 AO_{53}	—	January 5, 2006	Kitt Peak	Spacewatch	·	2.1 km	MPC · JPL
374529	2006 AZ_{53}	—	January 5, 2006	Kitt Peak	Spacewatch	WIT	1.1 km	MPC · JPL
374530	2006 AV_{57}	—	January 8, 2006	Mount Lemmon	Mount Lemmon Survey	·	2.6 km	MPC · JPL
374531	2006 AS_{65}	—	January 8, 2006	Mount Lemmon	Mount Lemmon Survey	·	2.2 km	MPC · JPL
374532	2006 AF_{73}	—	January 8, 2006	Catalina	CSS	·	1.4 km	MPC · JPL
374533	2006 AB_{75}	—	January 2, 2006	Mount Lemmon	Mount Lemmon Survey	·	2.3 km	MPC · JPL
374534	2006 AR_{84}	—	January 6, 2006	Anderson Mesa	LONEOS	·	1.9 km	MPC · JPL
374535	2006 AL_{104}	—	October 24, 2005	Mauna Kea	A. Boattini	·	2.7 km	MPC · JPL
374536	2006 AW_{104}	—	January 7, 2006	Mount Lemmon	Mount Lemmon Survey	·	2.7 km	MPC · JPL
374537	2006 BM_{9}	—	January 22, 2006	Anderson Mesa	LONEOS	·	1.7 km	MPC · JPL
374538	2006 BG_{39}	—	January 24, 2006	Mount Nyukasa	Japan Aerospace Exploration Agency	·	1.7 km	MPC · JPL
374539	2006 BS_{56}	—	January 22, 2006	Mount Lemmon	Mount Lemmon Survey	PAD	1.9 km	MPC · JPL
374540	2006 BZ_{61}	—	January 22, 2006	Anderson Mesa	LONEOS	·	1.3 km	MPC · JPL
374541	2006 BV_{66}	—	January 23, 2006	Kitt Peak	Spacewatch	·	2.4 km	MPC · JPL
374542	2006 BS_{69}	—	January 23, 2006	Kitt Peak	Spacewatch	·	1.9 km	MPC · JPL
374543	2006 BR_{81}	—	January 23, 2006	Kitt Peak	Spacewatch	·	2.2 km	MPC · JPL
374544	2006 BE_{82}	—	January 23, 2006	Kitt Peak	Spacewatch	·	2.1 km	MPC · JPL
374545	2006 BA_{83}	—	January 24, 2006	Socorro	LINEAR	·	1.9 km	MPC · JPL
374546	2006 BL_{90}	—	January 25, 2006	Kitt Peak	Spacewatch	·	2.2 km	MPC · JPL
374547	2006 BZ_{93}	—	January 26, 2006	Kitt Peak	Spacewatch	·	2.0 km	MPC · JPL
374548	2006 BQ_{96}	—	January 26, 2006	Kitt Peak	Spacewatch	AGN	1.4 km	MPC · JPL
374549	2006 BF_{109}	—	January 25, 2006	Kitt Peak	Spacewatch	WIT	1.1 km	MPC · JPL
374550	2006 BT_{110}	—	January 25, 2006	Kitt Peak	Spacewatch	·	1.8 km	MPC · JPL
374551	2006 BO_{121}	—	January 26, 2006	Mount Lemmon	Mount Lemmon Survey	WIT	1.3 km	MPC · JPL
374552	2006 BO_{126}	—	January 26, 2006	Kitt Peak	Spacewatch	·	2.0 km	MPC · JPL
374553	2006 BG_{127}	—	January 26, 2006	Kitt Peak	Spacewatch	·	2.2 km	MPC · JPL
374554	2006 BZ_{127}	—	January 26, 2006	Kitt Peak	Spacewatch	·	1.4 km	MPC · JPL
374555	2006 BE_{130}	—	January 26, 2006	Kitt Peak	Spacewatch	BRA	1.8 km	MPC · JPL
374556	2006 BF_{136}	—	January 28, 2006	Kitt Peak	Spacewatch	·	2.1 km	MPC · JPL
374557	2006 BU_{146}	—	January 28, 2006	Bergisch Gladbach	W. Bickel	MIS	2.1 km	MPC · JPL
374558	2006 BK_{151}	—	January 25, 2006	Kitt Peak	Spacewatch	·	2.3 km	MPC · JPL
374559	2006 BN_{183}	—	January 27, 2006	Anderson Mesa	LONEOS	·	1.4 km	MPC · JPL
374560	2006 BH_{189}	—	January 28, 2006	Kitt Peak	Spacewatch	GEF	1.0 km	MPC · JPL
374561	2006 BJ_{192}	—	January 30, 2006	Kitt Peak	Spacewatch	·	1.5 km	MPC · JPL
374562	2006 BH_{214}	—	January 23, 2006	Catalina	CSS	·	1.6 km	MPC · JPL
374563	2006 BM_{222}	—	January 23, 2006	Mount Lemmon	Mount Lemmon Survey	HOF	2.6 km	MPC · JPL
374564	2006 BD_{226}	—	January 30, 2006	Kitt Peak	Spacewatch	L5	8.9 km	MPC · JPL
374565	2006 BN_{226}	—	January 23, 2006	Mount Lemmon	Mount Lemmon Survey	·	1.9 km	MPC · JPL
374566	2006 BG_{230}	—	January 23, 2006	Kitt Peak	Spacewatch	·	2.2 km	MPC · JPL
374567	2006 BY_{231}	—	January 31, 2006	Kitt Peak	Spacewatch	·	2.0 km	MPC · JPL
374568	2006 BU_{239}	—	January 31, 2006	Kitt Peak	Spacewatch	·	2.0 km	MPC · JPL
374569	2006 BH_{250}	—	January 31, 2006	Kitt Peak	Spacewatch	HOF	3.4 km	MPC · JPL
374570	2006 BN_{254}	—	January 31, 2006	Kitt Peak	Spacewatch	·	1.7 km	MPC · JPL
374571	2006 BC_{277}	—	January 30, 2006	Kitt Peak	Spacewatch	GEF	1.5 km	MPC · JPL
374572	2006 BD_{278}	—	January 26, 2006	Kitt Peak	Spacewatch	HOF	2.8 km	MPC · JPL
374573	2006 BR_{280}	—	January 31, 2006	Kitt Peak	Spacewatch	·	1.8 km	MPC · JPL
374574	2006 BT_{280}	—	January 23, 2006	Kitt Peak	Spacewatch	·	1.5 km	MPC · JPL
374575	2006 CE_{10}	—	February 6, 2006	Socorro	LINEAR	H	630 m	MPC · JPL
374576	2006 CD_{25}	—	February 2, 2006	Kitt Peak	Spacewatch	·	2.5 km	MPC · JPL
374577	2006 CM_{26}	—	February 2, 2006	Mount Lemmon	Mount Lemmon Survey	·	1.5 km	MPC · JPL
374578	2006 CF_{40}	—	February 2, 2006	Mount Lemmon	Mount Lemmon Survey	DOR	2.1 km	MPC · JPL
374579	2006 CM_{41}	—	February 2, 2006	Kitt Peak	Spacewatch	·	1.7 km	MPC · JPL
374580	2006 CJ_{52}	—	February 4, 2006	Kitt Peak	Spacewatch	L5	9.4 km	MPC · JPL
374581	2006 CP_{61}	—	October 28, 2005	Mount Lemmon	Mount Lemmon Survey	·	3.9 km	MPC · JPL
374582	2006 DK_{11}	—	February 21, 2006	Catalina	CSS	·	3.0 km	MPC · JPL
374583	2006 DH_{23}	—	January 31, 2006	Kitt Peak	Spacewatch	HOF	2.6 km	MPC · JPL
374584	2006 DQ_{23}	—	February 2, 2006	Mount Lemmon	Mount Lemmon Survey	·	2.2 km	MPC · JPL
374585	2006 DY_{27}	—	February 20, 2006	Kitt Peak	Spacewatch	·	3.3 km	MPC · JPL
374586	2006 DK_{47}	—	February 21, 2006	Mount Lemmon	Mount Lemmon Survey	·	1.4 km	MPC · JPL
374587	2006 DW_{50}	—	February 23, 2006	Kitt Peak	Spacewatch	·	1.6 km	MPC · JPL
374588	2006 DY_{54}	—	February 24, 2006	Kitt Peak	Spacewatch	·	2.1 km	MPC · JPL
374589	2006 DM_{57}	—	February 24, 2006	Mount Lemmon	Mount Lemmon Survey	·	1.9 km	MPC · JPL
374590	2006 DX_{76}	—	February 24, 2006	Kitt Peak	Spacewatch	KOR	1.6 km	MPC · JPL
374591	2006 DE_{77}	—	February 24, 2006	Kitt Peak	Spacewatch	(1547)	1.6 km	MPC · JPL
374592	2006 DD_{80}	—	February 24, 2006	Kitt Peak	Spacewatch	·	2.4 km	MPC · JPL
374593	2006 DS_{84}	—	February 24, 2006	Kitt Peak	Spacewatch	·	1.7 km	MPC · JPL
374594	2006 DZ_{86}	—	February 24, 2006	Kitt Peak	Spacewatch	KOR	1.5 km	MPC · JPL
374595	2006 DO_{90}	—	February 24, 2006	Kitt Peak	Spacewatch	·	3.8 km	MPC · JPL
374596	2006 DY_{94}	—	February 24, 2006	Kitt Peak	Spacewatch	EOS	1.9 km	MPC · JPL
374597	2006 DL_{95}	—	February 24, 2006	Kitt Peak	Spacewatch	·	2.4 km	MPC · JPL
374598	2006 DN_{105}	—	February 25, 2006	Mount Lemmon	Mount Lemmon Survey	·	3.2 km	MPC · JPL
374599	2006 DR_{106}	—	February 25, 2006	Mount Lemmon	Mount Lemmon Survey	KOR	1.3 km	MPC · JPL
374600	2006 DM_{110}	—	February 25, 2006	Kitt Peak	Spacewatch	DOR	2.8 km	MPC · JPL

== 374601–374700 ==
back to top

Designation			Discovery			Properties		Ref
Permanent	Provisional	Named after	Date	Site	Discoverer(s)	Category	Diam.	Ref
374601	2006 DH_{115}	—	February 27, 2006	Kitt Peak	Spacewatch	KOR	1.3 km	MPC · JPL
374602	2006 DW_{124}	—	February 24, 2006	Catalina	CSS	·	3.2 km	MPC · JPL
374603	2006 DN_{126}	—	February 1, 2006	Mount Lemmon	Mount Lemmon Survey	HOF	4.5 km	MPC · JPL
374604	2006 DP_{131}	—	February 25, 2006	Kitt Peak	Spacewatch	·	2.9 km	MPC · JPL
374605	2006 DK_{133}	—	February 1, 2006	Kitt Peak	Spacewatch	L5	9.3 km	MPC · JPL
374606	2006 DS_{136}	—	February 25, 2006	Kitt Peak	Spacewatch	GEF	1.4 km	MPC · JPL
374607	2006 DS_{144}	—	February 25, 2006	Mount Lemmon	Mount Lemmon Survey	·	2.9 km	MPC · JPL
374608	2006 DT_{149}	—	February 25, 2006	Kitt Peak	Spacewatch	·	2.0 km	MPC · JPL
374609	2006 DH_{150}	—	February 25, 2006	Kitt Peak	Spacewatch	·	2.1 km	MPC · JPL
374610	2006 DD_{164}	—	February 27, 2006	Mount Lemmon	Mount Lemmon Survey	AGN	1.4 km	MPC · JPL
374611	2006 DB_{169}	—	February 27, 2006	Kitt Peak	Spacewatch	·	2.2 km	MPC · JPL
374612	2006 DU_{212}	—	February 24, 2006	Kitt Peak	Spacewatch	AGN	1.3 km	MPC · JPL
374613	2006 DQ_{216}	—	February 21, 2006	Mount Lemmon	Mount Lemmon Survey	L5	10 km	MPC · JPL
374614	2006 EN_{22}	—	March 3, 2006	Kitt Peak	Spacewatch	AST	1.7 km	MPC · JPL
374615	2006 ED_{23}	—	March 3, 2006	Kitt Peak	Spacewatch	KOR	1.5 km	MPC · JPL
374616	2006 EB_{32}	—	March 3, 2006	Kitt Peak	Spacewatch	·	3.0 km	MPC · JPL
374617	2006 EK_{35}	—	March 3, 2006	Kitt Peak	Spacewatch	KOR	1.3 km	MPC · JPL
374618	2006 EG_{45}	—	March 4, 2006	Kitt Peak	Spacewatch	·	1.7 km	MPC · JPL
374619	2006 EG_{53}	—	March 9, 2006	Catalina	CSS	BAR	1.4 km	MPC · JPL
374620	2006 EO_{56}	—	March 5, 2006	Kitt Peak	Spacewatch	·	2.7 km	MPC · JPL
374621	2006 FB_{4}	—	March 23, 2006	Kitt Peak	Spacewatch	EOS	2.0 km	MPC · JPL
374622	2006 FK_{6}	—	March 23, 2006	Catalina	CSS	·	3.1 km	MPC · JPL
374623	2006 FR_{10}	—	March 21, 2006	Mount Lemmon	Mount Lemmon Survey	·	1.6 km	MPC · JPL
374624	2006 FG_{16}	—	February 27, 2006	Kitt Peak	Spacewatch	·	2.8 km	MPC · JPL
374625	2006 FS_{21}	—	March 24, 2006	Mount Lemmon	Mount Lemmon Survey	·	3.6 km	MPC · JPL
374626	2006 GL_{12}	—	April 2, 2006	Kitt Peak	Spacewatch	·	2.2 km	MPC · JPL
374627	2006 GF_{45}	—	April 7, 2006	Mount Lemmon	Mount Lemmon Survey	KOR	1.5 km	MPC · JPL
374628	2006 HU_{3}	—	April 18, 2006	Kitt Peak	Spacewatch	·	2.7 km	MPC · JPL
374629	2006 HV_{15}	—	April 20, 2006	Kitt Peak	Spacewatch	EUP	4.4 km	MPC · JPL
374630	2006 HH_{26}	—	April 20, 2006	Kitt Peak	Spacewatch	·	3.1 km	MPC · JPL
374631	2006 HB_{35}	—	April 19, 2006	Mount Lemmon	Mount Lemmon Survey	THM	2.8 km	MPC · JPL
374632	2006 HB_{42}	—	April 21, 2006	Kitt Peak	Spacewatch	·	3.4 km	MPC · JPL
374633	2006 HW_{44}	—	April 25, 2006	Kitt Peak	Spacewatch	·	2.5 km	MPC · JPL
374634	2006 HB_{51}	—	March 23, 2006	Mount Lemmon	Mount Lemmon Survey	·	2.5 km	MPC · JPL
374635	2006 HY_{62}	—	April 24, 2006	Kitt Peak	Spacewatch	HYG	2.9 km	MPC · JPL
374636	2006 HE_{63}	—	April 8, 2006	Kitt Peak	Spacewatch	·	540 m	MPC · JPL
374637	2006 HV_{65}	—	April 24, 2006	Kitt Peak	Spacewatch	·	2.1 km	MPC · JPL
374638	2006 HU_{68}	—	February 27, 2006	Mount Lemmon	Mount Lemmon Survey	·	2.4 km	MPC · JPL
374639	2006 HO_{72}	—	April 25, 2006	Kitt Peak	Spacewatch	HYG	3.2 km	MPC · JPL
374640	2006 HS_{82}	—	April 26, 2006	Kitt Peak	Spacewatch	·	3.4 km	MPC · JPL
374641	2006 HZ_{85}	—	April 27, 2006	Kitt Peak	Spacewatch	EOS	4.2 km	MPC · JPL
374642	2006 HX_{93}	—	April 29, 2006	Kitt Peak	Spacewatch	·	3.6 km	MPC · JPL
374643	2006 HP_{107}	—	April 30, 2006	Kitt Peak	Spacewatch	EOS	5.0 km	MPC · JPL
374644	2006 HC_{121}	—	April 30, 2006	Kitt Peak	Spacewatch	·	3.1 km	MPC · JPL
374645	2006 HL_{136}	—	April 26, 2006	Cerro Tololo	M. W. Buie	·	1.5 km	MPC · JPL
374646	2006 HR_{153}	—	April 21, 2006	Kitt Peak	Spacewatch	(8737)	3.3 km	MPC · JPL
374647	2006 JU_{11}	—	May 1, 2006	Kitt Peak	Spacewatch	(31811)	4.0 km	MPC · JPL
374648	2006 JA_{22}	—	April 24, 2006	Kitt Peak	Spacewatch	·	3.2 km	MPC · JPL
374649	2006 JS_{26}	—	May 5, 2006	Reedy Creek	J. Broughton	·	4.0 km	MPC · JPL
374650	2006 JO_{29}	—	May 3, 2006	Kitt Peak	Spacewatch	·	2.5 km	MPC · JPL
374651	2006 JC_{34}	—	May 4, 2006	Kitt Peak	Spacewatch	·	2.5 km	MPC · JPL
374652	2006 JZ_{48}	—	May 14, 2006	Palomar	NEAT	·	5.4 km	MPC · JPL
374653	2006 JR_{62}	—	May 1, 2006	Kitt Peak	M. W. Buie	·	2.1 km	MPC · JPL
374654	2006 JD_{72}	—	April 21, 2006	Mount Lemmon	Mount Lemmon Survey	·	2.4 km	MPC · JPL
374655	2006 JZ_{80}	—	May 7, 2006	Mount Lemmon	Mount Lemmon Survey	·	710 m	MPC · JPL
374656	2006 KH_{9}	—	May 19, 2006	Mount Lemmon	Mount Lemmon Survey	EOS	2.5 km	MPC · JPL
374657	2006 KR_{17}	—	May 21, 2006	Kitt Peak	Spacewatch	EOS	2.1 km	MPC · JPL
374658	2006 KM_{18}	—	May 21, 2006	Kitt Peak	Spacewatch	CYB	2.5 km	MPC · JPL
374659	2006 KW_{21}	—	May 19, 2006	Mount Lemmon	Mount Lemmon Survey	·	1.9 km	MPC · JPL
374660	2006 KT_{36}	—	May 21, 2006	Kitt Peak	Spacewatch	·	3.4 km	MPC · JPL
374661	2006 KK_{37}	—	May 22, 2006	Kitt Peak	Spacewatch	·	3.1 km	MPC · JPL
374662	2006 KN_{51}	—	May 21, 2006	Kitt Peak	Spacewatch	·	540 m	MPC · JPL
374663	2006 KX_{51}	—	May 21, 2006	Kitt Peak	Spacewatch	·	4.0 km	MPC · JPL
374664	2006 KP_{58}	—	May 22, 2006	Kitt Peak	Spacewatch	·	3.5 km	MPC · JPL
374665	2006 KN_{60}	—	May 22, 2006	Kitt Peak	Spacewatch	VER	2.9 km	MPC · JPL
374666	2006 KH_{66}	—	May 24, 2006	Mount Lemmon	Mount Lemmon Survey	·	2.0 km	MPC · JPL
374667	2006 KX_{71}	—	May 22, 2006	Kitt Peak	Spacewatch	·	4.7 km	MPC · JPL
374668	2006 KV_{88}	—	May 26, 2006	Kitt Peak	Spacewatch	·	3.3 km	MPC · JPL
374669	2006 KD_{112}	—	May 31, 2006	Mount Lemmon	Mount Lemmon Survey	EOS	2.4 km	MPC · JPL
374670	2006 KF_{112}	—	May 31, 2006	Mount Lemmon	Mount Lemmon Survey	·	3.8 km	MPC · JPL
374671	2006 KC_{114}	—	February 25, 2006	Mount Lemmon	Mount Lemmon Survey	THB	4.6 km	MPC · JPL
374672	2006 KO_{118}	—	May 28, 2006	Kitt Peak	Spacewatch	·	3.8 km	MPC · JPL
374673	2006 MV_{11}	—	May 9, 2006	Mount Lemmon	Mount Lemmon Survey	EOS	2.4 km	MPC · JPL
374674	2006 PA_{15}	—	August 15, 2006	Palomar	NEAT	·	800 m	MPC · JPL
374675	2006 PB_{17}	—	August 15, 2006	Palomar	NEAT	·	760 m	MPC · JPL
374676	2006 QD	—	August 17, 2006	Hibiscus	S. F. Hönig	·	710 m	MPC · JPL
374677	2006 QE_{18}	—	August 17, 2006	Palomar	NEAT	·	750 m	MPC · JPL
374678	2006 QC_{27}	—	August 19, 2006	Kitt Peak	Spacewatch	·	710 m	MPC · JPL
374679	2006 QF_{43}	—	August 18, 2006	Kitt Peak	Spacewatch	·	860 m	MPC · JPL
374680	2006 QL_{44}	—	August 19, 2006	Anderson Mesa	LONEOS	·	760 m	MPC · JPL
374681	2006 QC_{50}	—	August 22, 2006	Palomar	NEAT	·	660 m	MPC · JPL
374682	2006 QR_{50}	—	August 22, 2006	Palomar	NEAT	·	860 m	MPC · JPL
374683	2006 QM_{57}	—	August 27, 2006	Schiaparelli	Schiaparelli	·	830 m	MPC · JPL
374684	2006 QD_{64}	—	August 25, 2006	Socorro	LINEAR	·	810 m	MPC · JPL
374685	2006 QK_{70}	—	February 4, 2005	Mount Lemmon	Mount Lemmon Survey	·	720 m	MPC · JPL
374686	2006 QY_{111}	—	August 22, 2006	Palomar	NEAT	·	740 m	MPC · JPL
374687	2006 QN_{116}	—	August 27, 2006	Anderson Mesa	LONEOS	·	640 m	MPC · JPL
374688	2006 QP_{121}	—	August 29, 2006	Catalina	CSS	·	920 m	MPC · JPL
374689	2006 QX_{121}	—	August 29, 2006	Catalina	CSS	·	740 m	MPC · JPL
374690	2006 QM_{138}	—	August 16, 2006	Palomar	NEAT	·	770 m	MPC · JPL
374691	2006 QM_{184}	—	August 18, 2006	Kitt Peak	Spacewatch	·	940 m	MPC · JPL
374692	2006 QK_{185}	—	August 28, 2006	Kitt Peak	Spacewatch	·	840 m	MPC · JPL
374693	2006 RB_{4}	—	September 12, 2006	Catalina	CSS	·	1.1 km	MPC · JPL
374694	2006 RL_{5}	—	October 21, 2003	Kitt Peak	Spacewatch	·	1.0 km	MPC · JPL
374695	2006 RK_{17}	—	September 14, 2006	Palomar	NEAT	·	880 m	MPC · JPL
374696	2006 RZ_{20}	—	September 15, 2006	Kitt Peak	Spacewatch	·	720 m	MPC · JPL
374697	2006 RP_{37}	—	September 12, 2006	Catalina	CSS	·	940 m	MPC · JPL
374698	2006 RT_{47}	—	September 14, 2006	Kitt Peak	Spacewatch	·	860 m	MPC · JPL
374699	2006 RL_{48}	—	September 14, 2006	Kitt Peak	Spacewatch	·	800 m	MPC · JPL
374700	2006 RM_{49}	—	July 21, 2006	Mount Lemmon	Mount Lemmon Survey	·	850 m	MPC · JPL

== 374701–374800 ==
back to top

Designation			Discovery			Properties		Ref
Permanent	Provisional	Named after	Date	Site	Discoverer(s)	Category	Diam.	Ref
374701	2006 RR_{59}	—	September 15, 2006	Kitt Peak	Spacewatch	·	950 m	MPC · JPL
374702	2006 RJ_{62}	—	September 12, 2006	Catalina	CSS	slow	680 m	MPC · JPL
374703	2006 RD_{66}	—	September 14, 2006	Palomar	NEAT	·	1.0 km	MPC · JPL
374704	2006 RF_{68}	—	September 15, 2006	Kitt Peak	Spacewatch	·	780 m	MPC · JPL
374705	2006 RZ_{84}	—	September 15, 2006	Kitt Peak	Spacewatch	·	890 m	MPC · JPL
374706	2006 RK_{92}	—	September 15, 2006	Kitt Peak	Spacewatch	·	790 m	MPC · JPL
374707	2006 RQ_{92}	—	September 15, 2006	Kitt Peak	Spacewatch	·	670 m	MPC · JPL
374708	2006 RU_{100}	—	September 14, 2006	Catalina	CSS	V	870 m	MPC · JPL
374709	2006 RA_{102}	—	September 14, 2006	Kitt Peak	Spacewatch	·	800 m	MPC · JPL
374710 ʻOʻo	2006 RJ_{110}	ʻOʻo	September 14, 2006	Mauna Kea	Masiero, J.	·	820 m	MPC · JPL
374711	2006 SQ_{11}	—	September 16, 2006	Socorro	LINEAR	·	790 m	MPC · JPL
374712	2006 SR_{13}	—	September 17, 2006	Kitt Peak	Spacewatch	NYS	880 m	MPC · JPL
374713	2006 SR_{15}	—	July 21, 2006	Mount Lemmon	Mount Lemmon Survey	V	600 m	MPC · JPL
374714	2006 SJ_{17}	—	September 17, 2006	Kitt Peak	Spacewatch	·	820 m	MPC · JPL
374715 Dimpourbaix	2006 SH_{20}	Dimpourbaix	September 19, 2006	Uccle	T. Pauwels	·	850 m	MPC · JPL
374716	2006 SB_{23}	—	September 17, 2006	Anderson Mesa	LONEOS	·	980 m	MPC · JPL
374717	2006 SU_{24}	—	September 16, 2006	Catalina	CSS	V	640 m	MPC · JPL
374718	2006 SS_{25}	—	August 28, 2006	Catalina	CSS	·	870 m	MPC · JPL
374719	2006 SB_{26}	—	September 16, 2006	Catalina	CSS	·	880 m	MPC · JPL
374720	2006 SL_{26}	—	September 16, 2006	Catalina	CSS	·	1.1 km	MPC · JPL
374721	2006 SQ_{27}	—	September 16, 2006	Palomar	NEAT	·	780 m	MPC · JPL
374722	2006 SY_{35}	—	September 17, 2006	Anderson Mesa	LONEOS	·	840 m	MPC · JPL
374723	2006 SJ_{43}	—	September 16, 2006	Kitt Peak	Spacewatch	(2076)	760 m	MPC · JPL
374724	2006 SX_{49}	—	September 20, 2006	La Sagra	OAM	·	650 m	MPC · JPL
374725	2006 SV_{52}	—	September 19, 2006	Anderson Mesa	LONEOS	V	680 m	MPC · JPL
374726	2006 SU_{61}	—	September 17, 2006	Kitt Peak	Spacewatch	V	600 m	MPC · JPL
374727	2006 SO_{65}	—	September 18, 2006	Anderson Mesa	LONEOS	·	570 m	MPC · JPL
374728	2006 SN_{69}	—	July 22, 2006	Mount Lemmon	Mount Lemmon Survey	·	610 m	MPC · JPL
374729	2006 SC_{71}	—	September 19, 2006	Kitt Peak	Spacewatch	·	720 m	MPC · JPL
374730	2006 SO_{73}	—	September 19, 2006	Kitt Peak	Spacewatch	·	830 m	MPC · JPL
374731	2006 SG_{80}	—	September 17, 2006	Catalina	CSS	·	770 m	MPC · JPL
374732	2006 SW_{87}	—	September 18, 2006	Kitt Peak	Spacewatch	·	700 m	MPC · JPL
374733	2006 SD_{88}	—	September 18, 2006	Kitt Peak	Spacewatch	·	930 m	MPC · JPL
374734	2006 SF_{90}	—	September 18, 2006	Kitt Peak	Spacewatch	·	560 m	MPC · JPL
374735	2006 SM_{96}	—	September 18, 2006	Kitt Peak	Spacewatch	V	770 m	MPC · JPL
374736	2006 SW_{102}	—	September 19, 2006	Kitt Peak	Spacewatch	BAP	1.1 km	MPC · JPL
374737	2006 SC_{106}	—	September 19, 2006	Kitt Peak	Spacewatch	·	840 m	MPC · JPL
374738	2006 SQ_{111}	—	August 29, 2006	Catalina	CSS	·	740 m	MPC · JPL
374739	2006 SX_{116}	—	September 24, 2006	Kitt Peak	Spacewatch	·	830 m	MPC · JPL
374740	2006 SN_{129}	—	September 18, 2006	Anderson Mesa	LONEOS	·	770 m	MPC · JPL
374741	2006 SH_{130}	—	September 20, 2006	Anderson Mesa	LONEOS	·	690 m	MPC · JPL
374742	2006 ST_{145}	—	September 19, 2006	Kitt Peak	Spacewatch	·	1.2 km	MPC · JPL
374743	2006 SJ_{149}	—	September 19, 2006	Kitt Peak	Spacewatch	·	940 m	MPC · JPL
374744	2006 SP_{159}	—	September 23, 2006	Kitt Peak	Spacewatch	·	760 m	MPC · JPL
374745	2006 SH_{167}	—	September 25, 2006	Kitt Peak	Spacewatch	·	660 m	MPC · JPL
374746	2006 SV_{176}	—	September 25, 2006	Kitt Peak	Spacewatch	(2076)	880 m	MPC · JPL
374747	2006 SR_{179}	—	September 25, 2006	Kitt Peak	Spacewatch	·	750 m	MPC · JPL
374748	2006 SA_{181}	—	September 25, 2006	Mount Lemmon	Mount Lemmon Survey	·	610 m	MPC · JPL
374749	2006 SY_{187}	—	September 26, 2006	Kitt Peak	Spacewatch	·	640 m	MPC · JPL
374750	2006 SP_{196}	—	September 26, 2006	Kitt Peak	Spacewatch	PHO	940 m	MPC · JPL
374751	2006 SQ_{204}	—	September 25, 2006	Kitt Peak	Spacewatch	·	1.1 km	MPC · JPL
374752	2006 SZ_{207}	—	September 26, 2006	Kitt Peak	Spacewatch	·	860 m	MPC · JPL
374753	2006 SW_{226}	—	September 26, 2006	Kitt Peak	Spacewatch	·	810 m	MPC · JPL
374754	2006 SG_{233}	—	September 26, 2006	Kitt Peak	Spacewatch	PHO	910 m	MPC · JPL
374755	2006 ST_{233}	—	September 26, 2006	Kitt Peak	Spacewatch	V	550 m	MPC · JPL
374756	2006 SK_{237}	—	September 26, 2006	Mount Lemmon	Mount Lemmon Survey	·	720 m	MPC · JPL
374757	2006 SS_{241}	—	August 19, 2006	Kitt Peak	Spacewatch	·	570 m	MPC · JPL
374758	2006 SW_{251}	—	September 26, 2006	Kitt Peak	Spacewatch	·	580 m	MPC · JPL
374759	2006 SK_{257}	—	September 26, 2006	Kitt Peak	Spacewatch	·	830 m	MPC · JPL
374760	2006 SZ_{259}	—	September 26, 2006	Kitt Peak	Spacewatch	·	1.1 km	MPC · JPL
374761	2006 SV_{260}	—	September 18, 2006	Catalina	CSS	·	1.2 km	MPC · JPL
374762	2006 SH_{275}	—	September 27, 2006	Mount Lemmon	Mount Lemmon Survey	·	920 m	MPC · JPL
374763	2006 SW_{278}	—	September 28, 2006	Kitt Peak	Spacewatch	·	750 m	MPC · JPL
374764	2006 SH_{282}	—	September 25, 2006	Anderson Mesa	LONEOS	·	870 m	MPC · JPL
374765	2006 SA_{283}	—	August 27, 2006	Kitt Peak	Spacewatch	·	720 m	MPC · JPL
374766	2006 SB_{283}	—	August 29, 2006	Kitt Peak	Spacewatch	·	910 m	MPC · JPL
374767	2006 SP_{285}	—	July 21, 2006	Mount Lemmon	Mount Lemmon Survey	·	1.1 km	MPC · JPL
374768	2006 ST_{292}	—	September 25, 2006	Kitt Peak	Spacewatch	·	940 m	MPC · JPL
374769	2006 ST_{321}	—	September 27, 2006	Kitt Peak	Spacewatch	·	890 m	MPC · JPL
374770	2006 SL_{336}	—	September 28, 2006	Kitt Peak	Spacewatch	·	610 m	MPC · JPL
374771	2006 SO_{347}	—	September 28, 2006	Kitt Peak	Spacewatch	·	1.2 km	MPC · JPL
374772	2006 SA_{350}	—	September 18, 2006	Kitt Peak	Spacewatch	·	950 m	MPC · JPL
374773	2006 SM_{352}	—	September 19, 2006	Catalina	CSS	V	710 m	MPC · JPL
374774	2006 SF_{356}	—	September 30, 2006	Catalina	CSS	·	870 m	MPC · JPL
374775	2006 SB_{365}	—	September 30, 2006	Catalina	CSS	·	940 m	MPC · JPL
374776	2006 SA_{403}	—	September 26, 2006	Mount Lemmon	Mount Lemmon Survey	·	960 m	MPC · JPL
374777	2006 TZ_{1}	—	October 1, 2006	Kitt Peak	Spacewatch	·	800 m	MPC · JPL
374778	2006 TC_{2}	—	October 1, 2006	Kitt Peak	Spacewatch	·	1.1 km	MPC · JPL
374779	2006 TC_{10}	—	October 3, 2006	Mount Lemmon	Mount Lemmon Survey	(2076)	1.0 km	MPC · JPL
374780	2006 TY_{10}	—	October 15, 2006	Farra d'Isonzo	Farra d'Isonzo	PHO	1.3 km	MPC · JPL
374781	2006 TJ_{13}	—	October 10, 2006	Palomar	NEAT	·	770 m	MPC · JPL
374782	2006 TS_{15}	—	September 15, 2006	Kitt Peak	Spacewatch	NYS	870 m	MPC · JPL
374783	2006 TM_{26}	—	October 12, 2006	Kitt Peak	Spacewatch	·	850 m	MPC · JPL
374784	2006 TN_{28}	—	October 12, 2006	Kitt Peak	Spacewatch	·	750 m	MPC · JPL
374785	2006 TS_{28}	—	October 12, 2006	Kitt Peak	Spacewatch	V	690 m	MPC · JPL
374786	2006 TT_{34}	—	September 27, 2006	Mount Lemmon	Mount Lemmon Survey	·	1 km	MPC · JPL
374787	2006 TJ_{38}	—	October 12, 2006	Kitt Peak	Spacewatch	·	1.2 km	MPC · JPL
374788	2006 TA_{40}	—	October 12, 2006	Kitt Peak	Spacewatch	·	920 m	MPC · JPL
374789	2006 TD_{53}	—	September 28, 2006	Mount Lemmon	Mount Lemmon Survey	·	870 m	MPC · JPL
374790	2006 TC_{58}	—	October 15, 2006	Catalina	CSS	·	970 m	MPC · JPL
374791	2006 TC_{63}	—	September 17, 2006	Kitt Peak	Spacewatch	·	690 m	MPC · JPL
374792	2006 TE_{66}	—	September 18, 2006	Catalina	CSS	·	1.1 km	MPC · JPL
374793	2006 TM_{73}	—	October 2, 2006	Mount Lemmon	Mount Lemmon Survey	·	710 m	MPC · JPL
374794	2006 TK_{76}	—	October 11, 2006	Palomar	NEAT	·	700 m	MPC · JPL
374795	2006 TV_{77}	—	October 12, 2006	Kitt Peak	Spacewatch	·	950 m	MPC · JPL
374796	2006 TD_{79}	—	October 12, 2006	Kitt Peak	Spacewatch	·	1.2 km	MPC · JPL
374797	2006 TA_{98}	—	October 15, 2006	Kitt Peak	Spacewatch	·	660 m	MPC · JPL
374798	2006 TZ_{103}	—	October 15, 2006	Kitt Peak	Spacewatch	·	1.4 km	MPC · JPL
374799	2006 TT_{109}	—	October 11, 2006	Palomar	NEAT	V	700 m	MPC · JPL
374800	2006 TR_{126}	—	October 2, 2006	Mount Lemmon	Mount Lemmon Survey	·	1.1 km	MPC · JPL

== 374801–374900 ==
back to top

Designation			Discovery			Properties		Ref
Permanent	Provisional	Named after	Date	Site	Discoverer(s)	Category	Diam.	Ref
374801	2006 UP_{7}	—	October 3, 2006	Mount Lemmon	Mount Lemmon Survey	·	1.2 km	MPC · JPL
374802	2006 UP_{11}	—	October 17, 2006	Mount Lemmon	Mount Lemmon Survey	·	800 m	MPC · JPL
374803	2006 UL_{17}	—	October 19, 2006	Kanab	Sheridan, E.	·	910 m	MPC · JPL
374804	2006 UT_{28}	—	October 16, 2006	Kitt Peak	Spacewatch	·	1.3 km	MPC · JPL
374805	2006 UF_{33}	—	October 16, 2006	Kitt Peak	Spacewatch	NYS	1.0 km	MPC · JPL
374806	2006 UP_{35}	—	September 30, 2006	Mount Lemmon	Mount Lemmon Survey	·	1.1 km	MPC · JPL
374807	2006 UB_{39}	—	October 16, 2006	Kitt Peak	Spacewatch	V	680 m	MPC · JPL
374808	2006 UW_{42}	—	October 16, 2006	Kitt Peak	Spacewatch	·	1.7 km	MPC · JPL
374809	2006 UU_{43}	—	October 16, 2006	Kitt Peak	Spacewatch	V	650 m	MPC · JPL
374810	2006 UY_{65}	—	October 16, 2006	Catalina	CSS	·	950 m	MPC · JPL
374811	2006 UM_{67}	—	October 16, 2006	Catalina	CSS	·	1.2 km	MPC · JPL
374812	2006 UK_{68}	—	October 16, 2006	Catalina	CSS	·	1.2 km	MPC · JPL
374813	2006 UA_{78}	—	October 17, 2006	Kitt Peak	Spacewatch	·	1.1 km	MPC · JPL
374814	2006 UP_{81}	—	October 17, 2006	Mount Lemmon	Mount Lemmon Survey	·	900 m	MPC · JPL
374815	2006 US_{88}	—	September 30, 2006	Mount Lemmon	Mount Lemmon Survey	·	740 m	MPC · JPL
374816	2006 UW_{109}	—	October 19, 2006	Kitt Peak	Spacewatch	·	960 m	MPC · JPL
374817	2006 UT_{119}	—	September 30, 2006	Mount Lemmon	Mount Lemmon Survey	NYS	890 m	MPC · JPL
374818	2006 UL_{120}	—	October 19, 2006	Kitt Peak	Spacewatch	·	960 m	MPC · JPL
374819	2006 UT_{124}	—	October 19, 2006	Mount Lemmon	Mount Lemmon Survey	·	1.1 km	MPC · JPL
374820	2006 US_{130}	—	October 19, 2006	Kitt Peak	Spacewatch	·	1.1 km	MPC · JPL
374821	2006 UJ_{168}	—	October 21, 2006	Mount Lemmon	Mount Lemmon Survey	·	920 m	MPC · JPL
374822	2006 UR_{170}	—	October 3, 2006	Mount Lemmon	Mount Lemmon Survey	KOR	1.3 km	MPC · JPL
374823	2006 UU_{173}	—	October 22, 2006	Mount Lemmon	Mount Lemmon Survey	NYS	1.2 km	MPC · JPL
374824	2006 UK_{175}	—	October 16, 2006	Catalina	CSS	·	670 m	MPC · JPL
374825	2006 UT_{179}	—	October 16, 2006	Catalina	CSS	·	1.2 km	MPC · JPL
374826	2006 UV_{193}	—	October 20, 2006	Kitt Peak	Spacewatch	·	1.1 km	MPC · JPL
374827	2006 UW_{213}	—	September 27, 2006	Mount Lemmon	Mount Lemmon Survey	·	930 m	MPC · JPL
374828	2006 UK_{219}	—	October 16, 2006	Kitt Peak	Spacewatch	V	680 m	MPC · JPL
374829	2006 UA_{222}	—	October 17, 2006	Catalina	CSS	·	900 m	MPC · JPL
374830	2006 UF_{222}	—	October 17, 2006	Catalina	CSS	·	900 m	MPC · JPL
374831	2006 UG_{233}	—	October 21, 2006	Palomar	NEAT	·	750 m	MPC · JPL
374832	2006 UH_{233}	—	October 12, 2006	Kitt Peak	Spacewatch	·	890 m	MPC · JPL
374833	2006 UT_{240}	—	October 23, 2006	Mount Lemmon	Mount Lemmon Survey	·	2.4 km	MPC · JPL
374834	2006 UU_{242}	—	October 27, 2006	Kitt Peak	Spacewatch	·	800 m	MPC · JPL
374835	2006 UJ_{243}	—	October 27, 2006	Mount Lemmon	Mount Lemmon Survey	·	550 m	MPC · JPL
374836	2006 UA_{249}	—	October 27, 2006	Mount Lemmon	Mount Lemmon Survey	·	480 m	MPC · JPL
374837	2006 UY_{256}	—	October 28, 2006	Kitt Peak	Spacewatch	·	810 m	MPC · JPL
374838	2006 UZ_{264}	—	October 27, 2006	Mount Lemmon	Mount Lemmon Survey	PHO	960 m	MPC · JPL
374839	2006 UH_{265}	—	October 27, 2006	Catalina	CSS	V	860 m	MPC · JPL
374840	2006 US_{267}	—	October 27, 2006	Mount Lemmon	Mount Lemmon Survey	·	870 m	MPC · JPL
374841	2006 UJ_{268}	—	September 18, 2006	Catalina	CSS	·	1.3 km	MPC · JPL
374842	2006 UC_{272}	—	October 27, 2006	Mount Lemmon	Mount Lemmon Survey	MAS	590 m	MPC · JPL
374843	2006 UW_{273}	—	October 27, 2006	Kitt Peak	Spacewatch	·	940 m	MPC · JPL
374844	2006 UK_{281}	—	October 28, 2006	Mount Lemmon	Mount Lemmon Survey	·	810 m	MPC · JPL
374845	2006 UB_{301}	—	October 19, 2006	Kitt Peak	M. W. Buie	(883)	930 m	MPC · JPL
374846	2006 UP_{325}	—	October 20, 2006	Kitt Peak	M. W. Buie	·	1.3 km	MPC · JPL
374847	2006 UK_{336}	—	October 20, 2006	Mount Lemmon	Mount Lemmon Survey	·	770 m	MPC · JPL
374848 Arturomalignani	2006 VK	Arturomalignani	November 2, 2006	Remanzacco	Remanzacco	·	1.1 km	MPC · JPL
374849	2006 VO_{1}	—	September 28, 2006	Mount Lemmon	Mount Lemmon Survey	·	930 m	MPC · JPL
374850	2006 VL_{2}	—	October 19, 2006	Catalina	CSS	·	800 m	MPC · JPL
374851	2006 VV_{2}	—	November 11, 2006	Socorro	LINEAR	APO +1km · PHA · moon	1.6 km	MPC · JPL
374852	2006 VF_{4}	—	November 9, 2006	Kitt Peak	Spacewatch	·	1.4 km	MPC · JPL
374853	2006 VJ_{4}	—	October 21, 2006	Kitt Peak	Spacewatch	·	1.2 km	MPC · JPL
374854	2006 VV_{5}	—	November 10, 2006	Kitt Peak	Spacewatch	·	880 m	MPC · JPL
374855	2006 VQ_{13}	—	November 14, 2006	Socorro	LINEAR	APO · PHA	340 m	MPC · JPL
374856	2006 VJ_{18}	—	November 9, 2006	Kitt Peak	Spacewatch	·	1.1 km	MPC · JPL
374857	2006 VM_{23}	—	September 28, 2006	Mount Lemmon	Mount Lemmon Survey	·	1.0 km	MPC · JPL
374858	2006 VG_{26}	—	November 10, 2006	Kitt Peak	Spacewatch	·	1.1 km	MPC · JPL
374859	2006 VD_{27}	—	November 10, 2006	Kitt Peak	Spacewatch	·	800 m	MPC · JPL
374860	2006 VD_{30}	—	October 4, 2006	Mount Lemmon	Mount Lemmon Survey	NYS	1.2 km	MPC · JPL
374861	2006 VM_{32}	—	October 4, 2006	Mount Lemmon	Mount Lemmon Survey	·	830 m	MPC · JPL
374862	2006 VV_{35}	—	November 11, 2006	Mount Lemmon	Mount Lemmon Survey	·	1.1 km	MPC · JPL
374863	2006 VQ_{42}	—	November 12, 2006	Mount Lemmon	Mount Lemmon Survey	·	1.3 km	MPC · JPL
374864	2006 VD_{48}	—	November 10, 2006	Kitt Peak	Spacewatch	·	790 m	MPC · JPL
374865	2006 VO_{50}	—	November 10, 2006	Kitt Peak	Spacewatch	NYS	1.2 km	MPC · JPL
374866	2006 VP_{64}	—	November 11, 2006	Kitt Peak	Spacewatch	MAS	670 m	MPC · JPL
374867	2006 VG_{67}	—	November 11, 2006	Kitt Peak	Spacewatch	·	1.1 km	MPC · JPL
374868	2006 VP_{70}	—	November 11, 2006	Kitt Peak	Spacewatch	MAS	790 m	MPC · JPL
374869	2006 VQ_{81}	—	November 13, 2006	Kitt Peak	Spacewatch	V	630 m	MPC · JPL
374870	2006 VZ_{84}	—	November 13, 2006	Kitt Peak	Spacewatch	·	1.3 km	MPC · JPL
374871	2006 VU_{113}	—	November 13, 2006	Mount Lemmon	Mount Lemmon Survey	·	1.0 km	MPC · JPL
374872	2006 VO_{116}	—	November 14, 2006	Kitt Peak	Spacewatch	3:2	5.6 km	MPC · JPL
374873	2006 VX_{122}	—	November 14, 2006	Kitt Peak	Spacewatch	·	870 m	MPC · JPL
374874	2006 VH_{123}	—	September 28, 2006	Mount Lemmon	Mount Lemmon Survey	NYS	940 m	MPC · JPL
374875	2006 VM_{124}	—	November 14, 2006	Kitt Peak	Spacewatch	MAS	610 m	MPC · JPL
374876	2006 VC_{128}	—	November 15, 2006	Kitt Peak	Spacewatch	·	1.2 km	MPC · JPL
374877	2006 VC_{129}	—	November 15, 2006	Catalina	CSS	(2076)	870 m	MPC · JPL
374878	2006 VU_{137}	—	November 15, 2006	Kitt Peak	Spacewatch	·	1.2 km	MPC · JPL
374879	2006 VN_{150}	—	October 17, 2006	Kitt Peak	Spacewatch	·	1.5 km	MPC · JPL
374880	2006 VU_{152}	—	October 3, 2006	Mount Lemmon	Mount Lemmon Survey	·	960 m	MPC · JPL
374881	2006 WU_{7}	—	November 16, 2006	Kitt Peak	Spacewatch	·	970 m	MPC · JPL
374882	2006 WX_{7}	—	September 27, 2006	Mount Lemmon	Mount Lemmon Survey	NYS	980 m	MPC · JPL
374883	2006 WN_{8}	—	November 16, 2006	Kitt Peak	Spacewatch	NYS	1.0 km	MPC · JPL
374884	2006 WV_{8}	—	November 16, 2006	Kitt Peak	Spacewatch	·	1.1 km	MPC · JPL
374885	2006 WO_{11}	—	November 16, 2006	Socorro	LINEAR	·	1.5 km	MPC · JPL
374886	2006 WH_{27}	—	October 28, 2006	Mount Lemmon	Mount Lemmon Survey	NYS	970 m	MPC · JPL
374887	2006 WR_{34}	—	November 16, 2006	Kitt Peak	Spacewatch	·	1.3 km	MPC · JPL
374888	2006 WV_{38}	—	November 16, 2006	Kitt Peak	Spacewatch	THM	2.0 km	MPC · JPL
374889	2006 WM_{56}	—	November 16, 2006	Kitt Peak	Spacewatch	NYS	1.5 km	MPC · JPL
374890	2006 WU_{70}	—	November 18, 2006	Kitt Peak	Spacewatch	·	950 m	MPC · JPL
374891	2006 WH_{71}	—	November 18, 2006	Kitt Peak	Spacewatch	·	880 m	MPC · JPL
374892	2006 WU_{85}	—	November 18, 2006	Kitt Peak	Spacewatch	·	1.3 km	MPC · JPL
374893	2006 WT_{88}	—	November 18, 2006	Kitt Peak	Spacewatch	·	880 m	MPC · JPL
374894	2006 WF_{96}	—	September 27, 2006	Mount Lemmon	Mount Lemmon Survey	·	880 m	MPC · JPL
374895	2006 WJ_{100}	—	September 18, 2006	Catalina	CSS	·	990 m	MPC · JPL
374896	2006 WU_{100}	—	September 27, 2006	Mount Lemmon	Mount Lemmon Survey	·	760 m	MPC · JPL
374897	2006 WK_{108}	—	October 19, 2006	Mount Lemmon	Mount Lemmon Survey	NYS	1.2 km	MPC · JPL
374898	2006 WC_{110}	—	November 11, 2006	Kitt Peak	Spacewatch	·	1.3 km	MPC · JPL
374899	2006 WO_{117}	—	November 20, 2006	Mount Lemmon	Mount Lemmon Survey	·	780 m	MPC · JPL
374900	2006 WN_{158}	—	November 22, 2006	Socorro	LINEAR	·	970 m	MPC · JPL

== 374901–375000 ==
back to top

Designation			Discovery			Properties		Ref
Permanent	Provisional	Named after	Date	Site	Discoverer(s)	Category	Diam.	Ref
374901	2006 WZ_{159}	—	November 22, 2006	Mount Lemmon	Mount Lemmon Survey	·	1.3 km	MPC · JPL
374902	2006 WK_{163}	—	November 23, 2006	Kitt Peak	Spacewatch	·	1.3 km	MPC · JPL
374903	2006 WG_{181}	—	November 24, 2006	Mount Lemmon	Mount Lemmon Survey	NYS	1.0 km	MPC · JPL
374904	2006 WV_{198}	—	November 21, 2006	Mount Lemmon	Mount Lemmon Survey	NYS	1.1 km	MPC · JPL
374905	2006 WD_{204}	—	November 21, 2006	Mount Lemmon	Mount Lemmon Survey	·	1.4 km	MPC · JPL
374906	2006 WG_{204}	—	November 27, 2006	Mount Lemmon	Mount Lemmon Survey	·	1.2 km	MPC · JPL
374907	2006 XE_{1}	—	December 10, 2006	Socorro	LINEAR	·	760 m	MPC · JPL
374908	2006 XR_{10}	—	November 15, 2006	Mount Lemmon	Mount Lemmon Survey	NYS	1.0 km	MPC · JPL
374909	2006 XV_{11}	—	December 10, 2006	Kitt Peak	Spacewatch	MAS	820 m	MPC · JPL
374910	2006 XT_{12}	—	December 10, 2006	Kitt Peak	Spacewatch	·	1.7 km	MPC · JPL
374911	2006 XM_{18}	—	December 10, 2006	Kitt Peak	Spacewatch	·	1.5 km	MPC · JPL
374912	2006 XV_{19}	—	September 16, 1998	Kitt Peak	Spacewatch	MAS	710 m	MPC · JPL
374913	2006 XT_{23}	—	October 21, 2006	Lulin	LUSS	·	1.3 km	MPC · JPL
374914	2006 XF_{39}	—	December 11, 2006	Kitt Peak	Spacewatch	·	1.2 km	MPC · JPL
374915	2006 XL_{53}	—	December 14, 2006	Mount Lemmon	Mount Lemmon Survey	NYS	1.7 km	MPC · JPL
374916	2006 XP_{54}	—	December 15, 2006	Socorro	LINEAR	NYS	1.2 km	MPC · JPL
374917	2006 XG_{60}	—	December 14, 2006	Kitt Peak	Spacewatch	NYS	1.3 km	MPC · JPL
374918	2006 XT_{62}	—	December 15, 2006	Kitt Peak	Spacewatch	NYS	940 m	MPC · JPL
374919	2006 XB_{68}	—	December 14, 2006	Mount Lemmon	Mount Lemmon Survey	NYS	1.4 km	MPC · JPL
374920	2006 XT_{70}	—	December 13, 2006	Mount Lemmon	Mount Lemmon Survey	MAS	770 m	MPC · JPL
374921	2006 XE_{71}	—	December 14, 2006	Kitt Peak	Spacewatch	·	1.2 km	MPC · JPL
374922	2006 YY_{1}	—	December 19, 2006	Eskridge	Farpoint	MAS	710 m	MPC · JPL
374923	2006 YP_{4}	—	December 16, 2006	Kitt Peak	Spacewatch	MAS	780 m	MPC · JPL
374924	2006 YD_{9}	—	December 20, 2006	Mount Lemmon	Mount Lemmon Survey	·	1.3 km	MPC · JPL
374925	2006 YQ_{11}	—	December 18, 2006	Mount Nyukasa	Japan Aerospace Exploration Agency	V	770 m	MPC · JPL
374926	2006 YT_{12}	—	November 1, 2006	Mount Lemmon	Mount Lemmon Survey	MAS	870 m	MPC · JPL
374927	2006 YA_{17}	—	December 21, 2006	Mount Lemmon	Mount Lemmon Survey	NYS	1.4 km	MPC · JPL
374928	2006 YB_{25}	—	December 21, 2006	Kitt Peak	Spacewatch	·	1.8 km	MPC · JPL
374929	2006 YB_{47}	—	November 19, 2006	Kitt Peak	Spacewatch	·	1.2 km	MPC · JPL
374930	2007 AU_{12}	—	November 21, 2006	Mount Lemmon	Mount Lemmon Survey	·	1.2 km	MPC · JPL
374931	2007 AJ_{15}	—	January 10, 2007	Catalina	CSS	·	1.4 km	MPC · JPL
374932	2007 AM_{17}	—	January 15, 2007	Catalina	CSS	NYS	1.6 km	MPC · JPL
374933	2007 AT_{23}	—	January 10, 2007	Mount Lemmon	Mount Lemmon Survey	·	1.7 km	MPC · JPL
374934	2007 AY_{27}	—	January 10, 2007	Mount Lemmon	Mount Lemmon Survey	NYS	1.2 km	MPC · JPL
374935	2007 BL	—	November 15, 2006	Mount Lemmon	Mount Lemmon Survey	·	1.7 km	MPC · JPL
374936	2007 BE_{3}	—	November 27, 2006	Mount Lemmon	Mount Lemmon Survey	NYS	1.1 km	MPC · JPL
374937	2007 BC_{4}	—	January 16, 2007	Socorro	LINEAR	·	1.4 km	MPC · JPL
374938	2007 BU_{19}	—	January 23, 2007	Anderson Mesa	LONEOS	·	1.5 km	MPC · JPL
374939	2007 BL_{23}	—	January 24, 2007	Mount Lemmon	Mount Lemmon Survey	NYS	1.1 km	MPC · JPL
374940	2007 BU_{35}	—	January 24, 2007	Mount Lemmon	Mount Lemmon Survey	·	1.1 km	MPC · JPL
374941	2007 BE_{38}	—	December 27, 2006	Mount Lemmon	Mount Lemmon Survey	·	1.2 km	MPC · JPL
374942	2007 BN_{41}	—	January 24, 2007	Mount Lemmon	Mount Lemmon Survey	MAS	600 m	MPC · JPL
374943	2007 BX_{49}	—	January 26, 2007	Piszkéstető	K. Sárneczky	·	1.1 km	MPC · JPL
374944	2007 BV_{54}	—	January 24, 2007	Mount Lemmon	Mount Lemmon Survey	(5)	1.1 km	MPC · JPL
374945	2007 BH_{57}	—	January 24, 2007	Socorro	LINEAR	·	1.5 km	MPC · JPL
374946	2007 BU_{61}	—	January 27, 2007	Mount Lemmon	Mount Lemmon Survey	MAS	770 m	MPC · JPL
374947	2007 BA_{65}	—	January 27, 2007	Mount Lemmon	Mount Lemmon Survey	·	1.4 km	MPC · JPL
374948	2007 BE_{74}	—	January 17, 2007	Kitt Peak	Spacewatch	·	1.3 km	MPC · JPL
374949	2007 CR_{2}	—	December 23, 2006	Mount Lemmon	Mount Lemmon Survey	·	1.2 km	MPC · JPL
374950	2007 CG_{6}	—	November 21, 2006	Mount Lemmon	Mount Lemmon Survey	NYS	1.4 km	MPC · JPL
374951	2007 CN_{7}	—	November 21, 2006	Mount Lemmon	Mount Lemmon Survey	NYS	1.4 km	MPC · JPL
374952	2007 CZ_{14}	—	February 7, 2007	Mount Lemmon	Mount Lemmon Survey	·	1.9 km	MPC · JPL
374953	2007 CW_{34}	—	February 6, 2007	Palomar	NEAT	·	1.2 km	MPC · JPL
374954	2007 CZ_{35}	—	February 6, 2007	Mount Lemmon	Mount Lemmon Survey	NYS	1.3 km	MPC · JPL
374955	2007 CK_{37}	—	February 6, 2007	Mount Lemmon	Mount Lemmon Survey	MAS	1.1 km	MPC · JPL
374956	2007 CQ_{39}	—	January 10, 2007	Mount Lemmon	Mount Lemmon Survey	MAS	710 m	MPC · JPL
374957	2007 CN_{46}	—	February 8, 2007	Mount Lemmon	Mount Lemmon Survey	·	1.5 km	MPC · JPL
374958	2007 CF_{47}	—	February 8, 2007	Palomar	NEAT	·	2.1 km	MPC · JPL
374959	2007 CV_{47}	—	February 10, 2007	Mount Lemmon	Mount Lemmon Survey	NYS	1.3 km	MPC · JPL
374960	2007 CC_{50}	—	February 10, 2007	Catalina	CSS	EUN	2.4 km	MPC · JPL
374961	2007 CK_{56}	—	February 15, 2007	Catalina	CSS	·	2.0 km	MPC · JPL
374962	2007 CB_{61}	—	February 13, 2007	Socorro	LINEAR	V	760 m	MPC · JPL
374963	2007 DS_{2}	—	February 16, 2007	Catalina	CSS	·	1.5 km	MPC · JPL
374964	2007 DG_{5}	—	February 17, 2007	Kitt Peak	Spacewatch	·	1.3 km	MPC · JPL
374965	2007 DC_{11}	—	February 17, 2007	Kitt Peak	Spacewatch	·	1.9 km	MPC · JPL
374966	2007 DE_{23}	—	February 17, 2007	Kitt Peak	Spacewatch	·	1.2 km	MPC · JPL
374967	2007 DL_{25}	—	October 29, 2005	Mount Lemmon	Mount Lemmon Survey	·	1.4 km	MPC · JPL
374968	2007 DP_{29}	—	February 17, 2007	Kitt Peak	Spacewatch	·	990 m	MPC · JPL
374969	2007 DL_{37}	—	February 17, 2007	Kitt Peak	Spacewatch	·	2.0 km	MPC · JPL
374970	2007 DD_{41}	—	February 22, 2007	Catalina	CSS	H	600 m	MPC · JPL
374971	2007 DV_{43}	—	February 17, 2007	Mount Lemmon	Mount Lemmon Survey	·	960 m	MPC · JPL
374972	2007 DA_{50}	—	March 10, 2003	Anderson Mesa	LONEOS	·	1.6 km	MPC · JPL
374973	2007 DA_{52}	—	February 17, 2007	Mount Lemmon	Mount Lemmon Survey	·	1.6 km	MPC · JPL
374974	2007 DF_{75}	—	February 21, 2007	Mount Lemmon	Mount Lemmon Survey	·	1.2 km	MPC · JPL
374975	2007 DW_{90}	—	September 18, 1999	Kitt Peak	Spacewatch	·	2.1 km	MPC · JPL
374976	2007 DN_{97}	—	February 23, 2007	Kitt Peak	Spacewatch	·	1.4 km	MPC · JPL
374977	2007 DR_{105}	—	February 17, 2007	Mount Lemmon	Mount Lemmon Survey	·	1.4 km	MPC · JPL
374978	2007 ES_{7}	—	March 9, 2007	Mount Lemmon	Mount Lemmon Survey	EUN	1.7 km	MPC · JPL
374979	2007 EM_{9}	—	March 9, 2007	Mount Lemmon	Mount Lemmon Survey	HNS	1.1 km	MPC · JPL
374980	2007 EJ_{23}	—	March 10, 2007	Mount Lemmon	Mount Lemmon Survey	·	2.3 km	MPC · JPL
374981	2007 EG_{30}	—	February 26, 2007	Mount Lemmon	Mount Lemmon Survey	·	1.8 km	MPC · JPL
374982	2007 ER_{36}	—	March 11, 2007	Anderson Mesa	LONEOS	·	2.4 km	MPC · JPL
374983	2007 EZ_{36}	—	February 27, 2007	Kitt Peak	Spacewatch	·	1.7 km	MPC · JPL
374984	2007 ED_{38}	—	March 11, 2007	Mount Lemmon	Mount Lemmon Survey	(5)	1.7 km	MPC · JPL
374985	2007 EO_{71}	—	March 10, 2007	Kitt Peak	Spacewatch	H	530 m	MPC · JPL
374986	2007 EV_{79}	—	March 10, 2007	Mount Lemmon	Mount Lemmon Survey	(5)	1.4 km	MPC · JPL
374987	2007 EX_{81}	—	March 11, 2007	Kitt Peak	Spacewatch	·	1.9 km	MPC · JPL
374988	2007 EB_{83}	—	March 27, 2003	Kitt Peak	Spacewatch	·	1.6 km	MPC · JPL
374989	2007 EF_{87}	—	March 13, 2007	Kitt Peak	Spacewatch	·	2.3 km	MPC · JPL
374990	2007 EV_{124}	—	March 14, 2007	Kitt Peak	Spacewatch	·	1.6 km	MPC · JPL
374991	2007 EZ_{136}	—	March 11, 2007	Kitt Peak	Spacewatch	·	990 m	MPC · JPL
374992	2007 EY_{180}	—	March 14, 2007	Kitt Peak	Spacewatch	·	1.3 km	MPC · JPL
374993	2007 ED_{191}	—	March 13, 2007	Kitt Peak	Spacewatch	·	2.0 km	MPC · JPL
374994	2007 EX_{196}	—	March 15, 2007	Kitt Peak	Spacewatch	·	1.5 km	MPC · JPL
374995	2007 EM_{210}	—	March 8, 2007	Palomar	NEAT	·	980 m	MPC · JPL
374996	2007 ET_{214}	—	March 10, 2007	Kitt Peak	Spacewatch	·	1.9 km	MPC · JPL
374997	2007 ES_{217}	—	March 13, 2007	Kitt Peak	Spacewatch	·	1.0 km	MPC · JPL
374998	2007 EB_{222}	—	March 11, 2007	Kitt Peak	Spacewatch	·	2.4 km	MPC · JPL
374999	2007 EN_{222}	—	March 11, 2007	Catalina	CSS	H	600 m	MPC · JPL
375000	2007 EN_{223}	—	March 14, 2007	Mount Lemmon	Mount Lemmon Survey	·	2.0 km	MPC · JPL

back to top

== See also ==
- Meanings of minor-planet names: 374001–375000
