= List of minor planets: 376001–377000 =

The following is a partial list of minor planets, running from minor-planet number 376001 through 377000, inclusive. The primary data for this and other partial lists is based on JPL's "Small-Body Orbital Elements" and data available from the Minor Planet Center. Critical list information is also provided by the MPC, unless otherwise specified from Lowell Observatory. A detailed description of the table's columns and additional sources are given on the main page including a complete list of every page in this series, and a statistical break-up on the dynamical classification of minor planets.

Also see the summary list of all named bodies in numerical and alphabetical order, and the corresponding naming citations for the number range of this particular list. New namings may only be added to this list after official publication, as the preannouncement of names is condemned by the Working Group for Small Bodies Nomenclature of the International Astronomical Union.

Near-Earth obj.	MBA (inner)	MBA (outer)	Centaur
Mars-crosser	MBA (middle)	Jupiter trojan	Trans-Neptunian obj.
Unclassified

== 376001–376100 ==
Designation			Discovery			Properties		Ref
Permanent	Provisional	Named after	Date	Site	Discoverer(s)	Category	Diam.	Ref
376001	2010 AF_{5}	—	January 4, 2010	Kitt Peak	Spacewatch	·	2.5 km	MPC · JPL
376002	2010 AT_{11}	—	January 6, 2010	Kitt Peak	Spacewatch	GEF	1.4 km	MPC · JPL
376003	2010 AD_{17}	—	January 7, 2010	Kitt Peak	Spacewatch	·	2.6 km	MPC · JPL
376004	2010 AM_{21}	—	January 6, 2010	Catalina	CSS	·	2.4 km	MPC · JPL
376005	2010 AN_{25}	—	January 6, 2010	Kitt Peak	Spacewatch	·	1.5 km	MPC · JPL
376006	2010 AV_{25}	—	January 6, 2010	Kitt Peak	Spacewatch	·	2.4 km	MPC · JPL
376007	2010 AL_{27}	—	September 6, 2008	Mount Lemmon	Mount Lemmon Survey	·	1.9 km	MPC · JPL
376008	2010 AB_{33}	—	January 7, 2010	Kitt Peak	Spacewatch	·	2.3 km	MPC · JPL
376009	2010 AK_{33}	—	January 7, 2010	Kitt Peak	Spacewatch	·	5.2 km	MPC · JPL
376010	2010 AB_{37}	—	January 7, 2010	Kitt Peak	Spacewatch	·	2.6 km	MPC · JPL
376011	2010 AR_{39}	—	January 9, 2010	Nazaret	Muler, G.	·	2.9 km	MPC · JPL
376012	2010 AS_{40}	—	January 12, 2010	Bisei SG Center	BATTeRS	·	2.1 km	MPC · JPL
376013	2010 AB_{41}	—	January 6, 2010	Kitt Peak	Spacewatch	·	2.5 km	MPC · JPL
376014	2010 AQ_{41}	—	November 21, 2009	Mount Lemmon	Mount Lemmon Survey	·	2.5 km	MPC · JPL
376015	2010 AT_{46}	—	January 8, 2010	Kitt Peak	Spacewatch	·	1.2 km	MPC · JPL
376016	2010 AQ_{64}	—	January 10, 2010	Kitt Peak	Spacewatch	·	4.1 km	MPC · JPL
376017	2010 AC_{68}	—	January 12, 2010	Kitt Peak	Spacewatch	DOR	2.7 km	MPC · JPL
376018	2010 AD_{68}	—	January 12, 2010	Mount Lemmon	Mount Lemmon Survey	·	780 m	MPC · JPL
376019	2010 AZ_{69}	—	January 12, 2010	Mount Lemmon	Mount Lemmon Survey	·	3.2 km	MPC · JPL
376020	2010 AE_{70}	—	January 12, 2010	Kitt Peak	Spacewatch	·	2.7 km	MPC · JPL
376021	2010 AQ_{76}	—	November 4, 2004	Anderson Mesa	LONEOS	DOR	3.2 km	MPC · JPL
376022	2010 AW_{76}	—	January 6, 2010	Kitt Peak	Spacewatch	TIR	3.4 km	MPC · JPL
376023	2010 AJ_{80}	—	January 7, 2010	Kitt Peak	Spacewatch	EOS	2.3 km	MPC · JPL
376024	2010 AD_{87}	—	January 8, 2010	WISE	WISE	·	4.5 km	MPC · JPL
376025	2010 BK_{1}	—	January 17, 2010	Dauban	Kugel, F.	HOF	2.8 km	MPC · JPL
376026	2010 BR_{46}	—	January 19, 2010	WISE	WISE	LIX	4.7 km	MPC · JPL
376027	2010 CH_{2}	—	January 11, 2010	Kitt Peak	Spacewatch	·	2.8 km	MPC · JPL
376028	2010 CX_{11}	—	February 6, 2010	Mayhill	Lowe, A.	EOS	2.5 km	MPC · JPL
376029 Blahová	2010 CQ_{12}	Blahová	February 12, 2010	Mayhill	Kurti, S.	THB	3.9 km	MPC · JPL
376030	2010 CA_{20}	—	February 6, 2010	La Sagra	OAM	·	2.8 km	MPC · JPL
376031	2010 CF_{22}	—	February 9, 2010	Catalina	CSS	·	2.4 km	MPC · JPL
376032	2010 CA_{35}	—	February 10, 2010	Kitt Peak	Spacewatch	·	3.6 km	MPC · JPL
376033	2010 CB_{51}	—	February 13, 2010	WISE	WISE	·	6.0 km	MPC · JPL
376034	2010 CJ_{60}	—	February 14, 2010	Socorro	LINEAR	EOS	2.9 km	MPC · JPL
376035	2010 CL_{81}	—	December 29, 1997	Kitt Peak	Spacewatch	·	3.5 km	MPC · JPL
376036	2010 CC_{100}	—	December 22, 1998	Kitt Peak	Spacewatch	·	3.2 km	MPC · JPL
376037	2010 CH_{111}	—	August 23, 2007	Kitt Peak	Spacewatch	·	3.6 km	MPC · JPL
376038	2010 CL_{115}	—	October 31, 2008	Catalina	CSS	EOS	1.9 km	MPC · JPL
376039	2010 CU_{128}	—	February 9, 2010	Catalina	CSS	·	2.5 km	MPC · JPL
376040	2010 CM_{137}	—	November 18, 2008	Catalina	CSS	EOS	1.9 km	MPC · JPL
376041	2010 CX_{145}	—	February 14, 2010	Catalina	CSS	·	3.7 km	MPC · JPL
376042	2010 CB_{146}	—	February 15, 2010	Catalina	CSS	·	2.5 km	MPC · JPL
376043	2010 CP_{147}	—	October 4, 2007	Mount Lemmon	Mount Lemmon Survey	·	4.6 km	MPC · JPL
376044	2010 CK_{149}	—	January 11, 2010	Mount Lemmon	Mount Lemmon Survey	·	4.6 km	MPC · JPL
376045	2010 CG_{152}	—	February 14, 2010	Kitt Peak	Spacewatch	EOS	2.7 km	MPC · JPL
376046	2010 CD_{165}	—	August 10, 2007	Kitt Peak	Spacewatch	·	3.4 km	MPC · JPL
376047	2010 DN_{10}	—	February 16, 2010	Mount Lemmon	Mount Lemmon Survey	·	4.1 km	MPC · JPL
376048	2010 DW_{27}	—	February 18, 2010	WISE	WISE	·	4.8 km	MPC · JPL
376049	2010 DS_{38}	—	February 16, 2010	Kitt Peak	Spacewatch	·	3.5 km	MPC · JPL
376050	2010 DW_{42}	—	January 15, 2004	Kitt Peak	Spacewatch	·	2.0 km	MPC · JPL
376051	2010 EK_{30}	—	March 9, 2010	Bergisch Gladbach	W. Bickel	EOS	3.0 km	MPC · JPL
376052	2010 EH_{44}	—	March 13, 2010	Črni Vrh	Mikuž, B.	·	5.1 km	MPC · JPL
376053	2010 EM_{80}	—	March 12, 2010	Mount Lemmon	Mount Lemmon Survey	VER	2.8 km	MPC · JPL
376054	2010 EL_{111}	—	March 14, 2010	Kitt Peak	Spacewatch	·	5.5 km	MPC · JPL
376055	2010 EO_{113}	—	March 4, 2010	Catalina	CSS	EOS	4.5 km	MPC · JPL
376056	2010 EJ_{127}	—	March 15, 2010	Mount Lemmon	Mount Lemmon Survey	·	3.6 km	MPC · JPL
376057	2010 EH_{147}	—	March 8, 2010	WISE	WISE	·	2.4 km	MPC · JPL
376058	2010 FX_{7}	—	March 16, 2010	WISE	WISE	HOF	3.0 km	MPC · JPL
376059	2010 FY_{14}	—	March 17, 2010	Catalina	CSS	(1118) · slow	5.8 km	MPC · JPL
376060	2010 FT_{16}	—	November 17, 2008	Kitt Peak	Spacewatch	THM	2.1 km	MPC · JPL
376061	2010 FF_{82}	—	January 13, 2004	Kitt Peak	Spacewatch	·	5.9 km	MPC · JPL
376062	2010 GU_{28}	—	January 20, 2009	Catalina	CSS	3:2	8.3 km	MPC · JPL
376063	2010 GT_{134}	—	November 7, 2002	Socorro	LINEAR	THM	2.9 km	MPC · JPL
376064	2010 GX_{141}	—	April 9, 2010	Mount Lemmon	Mount Lemmon Survey	LIX	3.6 km	MPC · JPL
376065	2010 GR_{144}	—	April 12, 2010	Mount Lemmon	Mount Lemmon Survey	·	4.3 km	MPC · JPL
376066	2010 GT_{145}	—	April 6, 2010	Catalina	CSS	·	3.5 km	MPC · JPL
376067	2010 HY_{30}	—	December 13, 2004	Kitt Peak	Spacewatch	L5	10 km	MPC · JPL
376068	2010 JQ_{5}	—	December 29, 2003	Catalina	CSS	·	5.3 km	MPC · JPL
376069	2010 LP_{62}	—	June 11, 2010	Mount Lemmon	Mount Lemmon Survey	·	4.1 km	MPC · JPL
376070	2010 NA_{40}	—	October 10, 2007	Kitt Peak	Spacewatch	·	980 m	MPC · JPL
376071	2010 OE_{49}	—	July 22, 2010	WISE	WISE	·	2.4 km	MPC · JPL
376072	2010 TF_{149}	—	October 12, 2010	Mount Lemmon	Mount Lemmon Survey	·	640 m	MPC · JPL
376073	2010 TO_{179}	—	October 4, 1999	Kitt Peak	Spacewatch	THM	2.1 km	MPC · JPL
376074	2010 US_{30}	—	November 5, 2007	Kitt Peak	Spacewatch	·	780 m	MPC · JPL
376075	2010 UY_{35}	—	May 1, 2009	Mount Lemmon	Mount Lemmon Survey	·	770 m	MPC · JPL
376076	2010 UF_{36}	—	October 29, 2010	Mount Lemmon	Mount Lemmon Survey	V	560 m	MPC · JPL
376077	2010 UN_{52}	—	September 5, 2010	Mount Lemmon	Mount Lemmon Survey	·	880 m	MPC · JPL
376078	2010 UV_{61}	—	December 20, 2004	Mount Lemmon	Mount Lemmon Survey	·	860 m	MPC · JPL
376079	2010 UU_{72}	—	December 13, 2007	Socorro	LINEAR	·	1 km	MPC · JPL
376080	2010 UL_{77}	—	September 18, 2003	Kitt Peak	Spacewatch	·	720 m	MPC · JPL
376081	2010 UK_{92}	—	September 16, 2010	Kitt Peak	Spacewatch	·	590 m	MPC · JPL
376082	2010 VS_{16}	—	November 9, 2007	Mount Lemmon	Mount Lemmon Survey	·	1.0 km	MPC · JPL
376083	2010 VR_{19}	—	December 5, 2007	Kitt Peak	Spacewatch	·	580 m	MPC · JPL
376084 Annettepeter	2010 VW_{20}	Annettepeter	November 3, 2010	Tzec Maun	E. Schwab	·	910 m	MPC · JPL
376085	2010 VQ_{47}	—	November 2, 2010	Kitt Peak	Spacewatch	·	640 m	MPC · JPL
376086	2010 VK_{53}	—	November 3, 2010	Mount Lemmon	Mount Lemmon Survey	·	800 m	MPC · JPL
376087	2010 VX_{81}	—	April 14, 2005	Kitt Peak	Spacewatch	·	1.3 km	MPC · JPL
376088	2010 VN_{84}	—	November 7, 2007	Mount Lemmon	Mount Lemmon Survey	·	800 m	MPC · JPL
376089	2010 VA_{106}	—	April 24, 2006	Kitt Peak	Spacewatch	·	600 m	MPC · JPL
376090	2010 VM_{117}	—	August 10, 1994	La Silla	E. W. Elst	·	1.3 km	MPC · JPL
376091	2010 VF_{119}	—	September 18, 2010	Mount Lemmon	Mount Lemmon Survey	·	630 m	MPC · JPL
376092	2010 VP_{159}	—	January 10, 2008	Kitt Peak	Spacewatch	·	590 m	MPC · JPL
376093	2010 VA_{161}	—	February 5, 2009	Mount Lemmon	Mount Lemmon Survey	·	910 m	MPC · JPL
376094	2010 VB_{166}	—	December 17, 2007	Kitt Peak	Spacewatch	·	680 m	MPC · JPL
376095	2010 VB_{168}	—	December 15, 2007	Kitt Peak	Spacewatch	·	850 m	MPC · JPL
376096	2010 VH_{169}	—	December 1, 2003	Kitt Peak	Spacewatch	·	820 m	MPC · JPL
376097	2010 VA_{171}	—	October 20, 2003	Kitt Peak	Spacewatch	·	700 m	MPC · JPL
376098	2010 VJ_{174}	—	March 24, 2002	Kitt Peak	Spacewatch	·	810 m	MPC · JPL
376099	2010 VP_{184}	—	November 1, 2010	Kitt Peak	Spacewatch	slow	1.1 km	MPC · JPL
376100	2010 VB_{192}	—	November 4, 2010	La Sagra	OAM	·	780 m	MPC · JPL

== 376101–376200 ==
back to top

Designation			Discovery			Properties		Ref
Permanent	Provisional	Named after	Date	Site	Discoverer(s)	Category	Diam.	Ref
376101	2010 VB_{211}	—	September 18, 2003	Kitt Peak	Spacewatch	·	840 m	MPC · JPL
376102	2010 VS_{215}	—	December 14, 2003	Kitt Peak	Spacewatch	·	1.1 km	MPC · JPL
376103	2010 WK_{2}	—	December 30, 2007	Mount Lemmon	Mount Lemmon Survey	·	640 m	MPC · JPL
376104	2010 WQ_{50}	—	November 28, 2010	Kitt Peak	Spacewatch	·	790 m	MPC · JPL
376105	2010 WL_{55}	—	November 19, 2003	Anderson Mesa	LONEOS	·	580 m	MPC · JPL
376106	2010 WB_{56}	—	November 11, 2007	Mount Lemmon	Mount Lemmon Survey	·	590 m	MPC · JPL
376107	2010 WD_{65}	—	March 3, 2008	Catalina	CSS	·	1.1 km	MPC · JPL
376108	2010 WK_{65}	—	January 18, 2008	Mount Lemmon	Mount Lemmon Survey	·	720 m	MPC · JPL
376109	2010 WY_{65}	—	March 8, 2008	Kitt Peak	Spacewatch	·	690 m	MPC · JPL
376110	2010 WL_{70}	—	October 19, 2000	Kitt Peak	Spacewatch	·	710 m	MPC · JPL
376111	2010 XY_{12}	—	November 5, 2002	La Palma	A. Fitzsimmons	MAS	800 m	MPC · JPL
376112	2010 XU_{14}	—	April 21, 2009	Mount Lemmon	Mount Lemmon Survey	·	740 m	MPC · JPL
376113	2010 XQ_{32}	—	October 17, 2003	Kitt Peak	Spacewatch	·	640 m	MPC · JPL
376114	2010 XY_{34}	—	October 16, 2003	Kitt Peak	Spacewatch	·	650 m	MPC · JPL
376115	2010 XB_{45}	—	February 7, 2002	Kitt Peak	Spacewatch	·	730 m	MPC · JPL
376116	2010 XQ_{85}	—	November 2, 2010	Mount Lemmon	Mount Lemmon Survey	·	720 m	MPC · JPL
376117	2011 AB	—	December 5, 2010	Mount Lemmon	Mount Lemmon Survey	·	1.1 km	MPC · JPL
376118	2011 AH_{7}	—	December 6, 2010	Kitt Peak	Spacewatch	·	1.3 km	MPC · JPL
376119	2011 AG_{8}	—	October 20, 2003	Kitt Peak	Spacewatch	·	620 m	MPC · JPL
376120	2011 AP_{12}	—	October 19, 2006	Kitt Peak	Spacewatch	·	1.4 km	MPC · JPL
376121	2011 AP_{13}	—	January 5, 2011	Catalina	CSS	·	2.0 km	MPC · JPL
376122	2011 AC_{24}	—	March 20, 2004	Socorro	LINEAR	V	890 m	MPC · JPL
376123	2011 AT_{28}	—	January 13, 2004	Kitt Peak	Spacewatch	·	630 m	MPC · JPL
376124	2011 AK_{33}	—	February 6, 2000	Catalina	CSS	NYS	1.4 km	MPC · JPL
376125	2011 AM_{35}	—	November 16, 2010	Mount Lemmon	Mount Lemmon Survey	PHO	1.4 km	MPC · JPL
376126	2011 AH_{45}	—	December 13, 2001	Socorro	LINEAR	·	2.0 km	MPC · JPL
376127	2011 AJ_{45}	—	December 24, 2006	Kitt Peak	Spacewatch	·	1.2 km	MPC · JPL
376128	2011 AV_{45}	—	December 13, 2006	Kitt Peak	Spacewatch	MAS	680 m	MPC · JPL
376129	2011 AD_{46}	—	December 10, 2005	Kitt Peak	Spacewatch	DOR	2.7 km	MPC · JPL
376130	2011 AG_{46}	—	July 2, 2008	Kitt Peak	Spacewatch	·	2.0 km	MPC · JPL
376131	2011 AH_{56}	—	November 22, 2006	Kitt Peak	Spacewatch	CLA	1.6 km	MPC · JPL
376132	2011 AN_{63}	—	September 19, 1998	Caussols	ODAS	·	1.5 km	MPC · JPL
376133	2011 AR_{63}	—	November 2, 2006	Mount Lemmon	Mount Lemmon Survey	·	1.1 km	MPC · JPL
376134	2011 AP_{65}	—	March 20, 2007	Catalina	CSS	·	1.9 km	MPC · JPL
376135	2011 AX_{66}	—	October 11, 1996	Kitt Peak	Spacewatch	·	610 m	MPC · JPL
376136	2011 AO_{68}	—	November 14, 1998	Kitt Peak	Spacewatch	·	1.1 km	MPC · JPL
376137	2011 AW_{68}	—	May 27, 2008	Kitt Peak	Spacewatch	·	1.3 km	MPC · JPL
376138	2011 AK_{73}	—	February 9, 2007	Catalina	CSS	·	1.8 km	MPC · JPL
376139	2011 BR_{1}	—	February 13, 2007	Mount Lemmon	Mount Lemmon Survey	·	1.7 km	MPC · JPL
376140	2011 BD_{3}	—	March 28, 2008	Mount Lemmon	Mount Lemmon Survey	NYS	1.3 km	MPC · JPL
376141	2011 BZ_{4}	—	August 19, 2006	Kitt Peak	Spacewatch	·	630 m	MPC · JPL
376142	2011 BK_{16}	—	January 29, 2000	Kitt Peak	Spacewatch	MAS	630 m	MPC · JPL
376143	2011 BW_{19}	—	March 14, 2007	Anderson Mesa	LONEOS	MAR	1.5 km	MPC · JPL
376144	2011 BZ_{19}	—	August 7, 2008	Kitt Peak	Spacewatch	·	2.3 km	MPC · JPL
376145	2011 BG_{20}	—	September 22, 2009	Mount Lemmon	Mount Lemmon Survey	NEM	2.3 km	MPC · JPL
376146	2011 BX_{27}	—	March 12, 2007	Kitt Peak	Spacewatch	·	2.0 km	MPC · JPL
376147	2011 BL_{28}	—	January 23, 2006	Mount Lemmon	Mount Lemmon Survey	·	2.3 km	MPC · JPL
376148	2011 BM_{31}	—	December 13, 2006	Mount Lemmon	Mount Lemmon Survey	·	1.6 km	MPC · JPL
376149	2011 BP_{32}	—	September 26, 2006	Mount Lemmon	Mount Lemmon Survey	·	640 m	MPC · JPL
376150	2011 BP_{34}	—	March 21, 2004	Kitt Peak	Spacewatch	·	1.4 km	MPC · JPL
376151	2011 BE_{59}	—	November 30, 2005	Kitt Peak	Spacewatch	·	1.9 km	MPC · JPL
376152	2011 BN_{66}	—	March 14, 2007	Kitt Peak	Spacewatch	·	1.6 km	MPC · JPL
376153	2011 BT_{69}	—	January 17, 2007	Kitt Peak	Spacewatch	·	900 m	MPC · JPL
376154	2011 BQ_{72}	—	March 16, 2004	Kitt Peak	Spacewatch	·	700 m	MPC · JPL
376155	2011 BP_{75}	—	August 11, 2004	Socorro	LINEAR	·	2.3 km	MPC · JPL
376156	2011 BH_{79}	—	November 19, 2006	Catalina	CSS	·	1.2 km	MPC · JPL
376157	2011 BE_{81}	—	December 27, 2006	Mount Lemmon	Mount Lemmon Survey	·	1.4 km	MPC · JPL
376158	2011 BD_{86}	—	July 1, 1997	Kitt Peak	Spacewatch	·	1.5 km	MPC · JPL
376159	2011 BF_{86}	—	August 27, 2009	Kitt Peak	Spacewatch	·	890 m	MPC · JPL
376160	2011 BZ_{99}	—	December 1, 2005	Kitt Peak	Spacewatch	·	2.4 km	MPC · JPL
376161	2011 BU_{105}	—	October 27, 2009	Kitt Peak	Spacewatch	·	2.1 km	MPC · JPL
376162	2011 BG_{118}	—	August 31, 2005	Kitt Peak	Spacewatch	·	1.4 km	MPC · JPL
376163	2011 BO_{123}	—	January 27, 2007	Kitt Peak	Spacewatch	·	2.5 km	MPC · JPL
376164	2011 BJ_{127}	—	January 27, 2011	Mount Lemmon	Mount Lemmon Survey	·	1.6 km	MPC · JPL
376165	2011 BG_{130}	—	January 28, 2011	Mount Lemmon	Mount Lemmon Survey	·	2.0 km	MPC · JPL
376166	2011 BT_{130}	—	November 8, 2009	Mount Lemmon	Mount Lemmon Survey	AGN	1.2 km	MPC · JPL
376167	2011 BC_{134}	—	January 14, 2011	Kitt Peak	Spacewatch	AEO	1.2 km	MPC · JPL
376168	2011 BN_{145}	—	January 10, 2011	Kitt Peak	Spacewatch	·	1.6 km	MPC · JPL
376169	2011 BH_{162}	—	February 15, 1994	Kitt Peak	Spacewatch	·	6.6 km	MPC · JPL
376170	2011 CL_{9}	—	December 6, 2005	Kitt Peak	Spacewatch	·	3.1 km	MPC · JPL
376171	2011 CV_{11}	—	January 28, 2007	Mount Lemmon	Mount Lemmon Survey	·	1.3 km	MPC · JPL
376172	2011 CL_{14}	—	December 1, 2005	Kitt Peak	Spacewatch	AST	1.9 km	MPC · JPL
376173	2011 CW_{14}	—	December 13, 2006	Kitt Peak	Spacewatch	CLA	1.7 km	MPC · JPL
376174	2011 CK_{15}	—	November 6, 2005	Kitt Peak	Spacewatch	·	1.8 km	MPC · JPL
376175	2011 CT_{15}	—	January 26, 2007	Kitt Peak	Spacewatch	·	1.2 km	MPC · JPL
376176	2011 CH_{17}	—	October 16, 2006	Catalina	CSS	·	1.0 km	MPC · JPL
376177	2011 CX_{17}	—	September 27, 2006	Mount Lemmon	Mount Lemmon Survey	·	860 m	MPC · JPL
376178	2011 CL_{27}	—	December 11, 2006	Kitt Peak	Spacewatch	NYS	1.5 km	MPC · JPL
376179	2011 CB_{31}	—	December 13, 2006	Mount Lemmon	Mount Lemmon Survey	NYS	1.1 km	MPC · JPL
376180	2011 CD_{32}	—	September 11, 2004	Kitt Peak	Spacewatch	·	1.6 km	MPC · JPL
376181	2011 CT_{32}	—	January 25, 2007	Kitt Peak	Spacewatch	·	980 m	MPC · JPL
376182	2011 CB_{35}	—	September 7, 2008	Mount Lemmon	Mount Lemmon Survey	·	2.1 km	MPC · JPL
376183	2011 CS_{35}	—	February 7, 2002	Socorro	LINEAR	·	2.6 km	MPC · JPL
376184	2011 CX_{41}	—	July 12, 2005	Kitt Peak	Spacewatch	·	910 m	MPC · JPL
376185	2011 CR_{48}	—	October 1, 2005	Catalina	CSS	·	2.0 km	MPC · JPL
376186	2011 CE_{51}	—	March 20, 2007	Mount Lemmon	Mount Lemmon Survey	·	1.7 km	MPC · JPL
376187	2011 CT_{51}	—	December 24, 2006	Kitt Peak	Spacewatch	·	1.1 km	MPC · JPL
376188	2011 CT_{53}	—	February 23, 2006	Anderson Mesa	LONEOS	EOS	2.5 km	MPC · JPL
376189	2011 CG_{62}	—	May 30, 2008	Kitt Peak	Spacewatch	·	1.2 km	MPC · JPL
376190	2011 CN_{65}	—	February 1, 2010	WISE	WISE	·	1.6 km	MPC · JPL
376191	2011 CU_{66}	—	September 19, 2006	Kitt Peak	Spacewatch	·	660 m	MPC · JPL
376192	2011 CE_{67}	—	November 17, 2006	Kitt Peak	Spacewatch	·	1.0 km	MPC · JPL
376193	2011 CB_{68}	—	September 15, 2004	Kitt Peak	Spacewatch	·	1.7 km	MPC · JPL
376194	2011 CQ_{71}	—	September 7, 2004	Kitt Peak	Spacewatch	·	2.1 km	MPC · JPL
376195	2011 CL_{72}	—	March 31, 2004	Kitt Peak	Spacewatch	ERI	1.7 km	MPC · JPL
376196	2011 CD_{73}	—	April 22, 2004	Kitt Peak	Spacewatch	MAS	980 m	MPC · JPL
376197	2011 CR_{75}	—	May 9, 2004	Kitt Peak	Spacewatch	·	1.6 km	MPC · JPL
376198	2011 CN_{81}	—	November 27, 2009	Mount Lemmon	Mount Lemmon Survey	·	4.8 km	MPC · JPL
376199	2011 CO_{86}	—	November 9, 2009	Kitt Peak	Spacewatch	·	2.0 km	MPC · JPL
376200	2011 CP_{116}	—	January 27, 2007	Kitt Peak	Spacewatch	MAS	700 m	MPC · JPL

== 376201–376300 ==
back to top

Designation			Discovery			Properties		Ref
Permanent	Provisional	Named after	Date	Site	Discoverer(s)	Category	Diam.	Ref
376201	2011 CA_{117}	—	April 20, 2007	Kitt Peak	Spacewatch	·	2.3 km	MPC · JPL
376202	2011 DP_{1}	—	November 11, 2006	Mount Lemmon	Mount Lemmon Survey	MAS	740 m	MPC · JPL
376203	2011 DE_{2}	—	November 24, 2006	Kitt Peak	Spacewatch	NYS	1.0 km	MPC · JPL
376204	2011 DD_{4}	—	November 16, 2006	Mount Lemmon	Mount Lemmon Survey	·	1.3 km	MPC · JPL
376205	2011 DV_{9}	—	January 5, 2006	Kitt Peak	Spacewatch	·	1.8 km	MPC · JPL
376206	2011 DT_{11}	—	December 26, 2006	Kitt Peak	Spacewatch	·	1.2 km	MPC · JPL
376207	2011 DD_{12}	—	February 8, 2011	Mount Lemmon	Mount Lemmon Survey	·	1.7 km	MPC · JPL
376208	2011 DH_{15}	—	January 22, 2002	Kitt Peak	Spacewatch	·	1.5 km	MPC · JPL
376209	2011 DA_{18}	—	September 24, 2004	Tucson	R. A. Tucker	·	1.5 km	MPC · JPL
376210	2011 DB_{24}	—	February 26, 2011	Kitt Peak	Spacewatch	·	1.7 km	MPC · JPL
376211	2011 DJ_{24}	—	January 21, 2002	Kitt Peak	Spacewatch	·	2.0 km	MPC · JPL
376212	2011 DU_{28}	—	November 22, 2006	Kitt Peak	Spacewatch	MAS	700 m	MPC · JPL
376213	2011 DO_{29}	—	December 24, 2006	Kitt Peak	Spacewatch	·	1.2 km	MPC · JPL
376214	2011 DN_{35}	—	April 24, 2006	Kitt Peak	Spacewatch	THM	2.1 km	MPC · JPL
376215	2011 DK_{42}	—	January 15, 1996	Linz	E. Meyer	·	1.4 km	MPC · JPL
376216	2011 EZ_{2}	—	February 10, 2011	Mount Lemmon	Mount Lemmon Survey	·	2.7 km	MPC · JPL
376217	2011 EQ_{4}	—	March 1, 2011	Catalina	CSS	·	2.5 km	MPC · JPL
376218	2011 EZ_{6}	—	December 21, 2004	Catalina	CSS	·	4.3 km	MPC · JPL
376219	2011 ER_{12}	—	April 21, 2004	Kitt Peak	Spacewatch	NYS	1.4 km	MPC · JPL
376220	2011 EG_{13}	—	March 21, 1993	La Silla	UESAC	·	1.9 km	MPC · JPL
376221	2011 EH_{15}	—	January 30, 2006	Kitt Peak	Spacewatch	·	1.4 km	MPC · JPL
376222	2011 EK_{17}	—	December 14, 2001	Socorro	LINEAR	RAF	1.1 km	MPC · JPL
376223	2011 EB_{24}	—	February 6, 2007	Mount Lemmon	Mount Lemmon Survey	·	1.0 km	MPC · JPL
376224	2011 ET_{24}	—	October 2, 2008	Kitt Peak	Spacewatch	·	3.5 km	MPC · JPL
376225	2011 ED_{25}	—	October 10, 2008	Mount Lemmon	Mount Lemmon Survey	·	3.7 km	MPC · JPL
376226	2011 EG_{27}	—	October 26, 2009	Mount Lemmon	Mount Lemmon Survey	ADE	1.7 km	MPC · JPL
376227	2011 EL_{35}	—	October 8, 2004	Kitt Peak	Spacewatch	·	1.8 km	MPC · JPL
376228	2011 EH_{37}	—	September 29, 2008	Mount Lemmon	Mount Lemmon Survey	·	3.7 km	MPC · JPL
376229	2011 EB_{40}	—	December 14, 2006	Mount Lemmon	Mount Lemmon Survey	·	1.4 km	MPC · JPL
376230	2011 ER_{41}	—	November 22, 2006	Mount Lemmon	Mount Lemmon Survey	NYS	1.1 km	MPC · JPL
376231	2011 EE_{42}	—	February 1, 2006	Kitt Peak	Spacewatch	·	2.4 km	MPC · JPL
376232	2011 EO_{42}	—	March 11, 2007	Mount Lemmon	Mount Lemmon Survey	·	1.9 km	MPC · JPL
376233	2011 EZ_{43}	—	November 18, 2003	Kitt Peak	Spacewatch	EOS	2.5 km	MPC · JPL
376234	2011 EN_{44}	—	November 18, 1995	Kitt Peak	Spacewatch	·	3.0 km	MPC · JPL
376235	2011 EV_{44}	—	February 22, 2006	Anderson Mesa	LONEOS	·	3.2 km	MPC · JPL
376236	2011 EX_{44}	—	November 6, 2008	Mount Lemmon	Mount Lemmon Survey	VER	2.9 km	MPC · JPL
376237	2011 EN_{45}	—	November 29, 1999	Kitt Peak	Spacewatch	KOR	1.8 km	MPC · JPL
376238	2011 EC_{50}	—	March 3, 2010	WISE	WISE	NAE	3.2 km	MPC · JPL
376239	2011 EO_{50}	—	April 15, 2007	Kitt Peak	Spacewatch	·	2.1 km	MPC · JPL
376240	2011 EM_{53}	—	September 21, 2007	Kitt Peak	Spacewatch	·	4.5 km	MPC · JPL
376241	2011 EG_{55}	—	February 25, 2011	Kitt Peak	Spacewatch	·	4.4 km	MPC · JPL
376242	2011 EE_{68}	—	April 19, 2006	Catalina	CSS	·	3.6 km	MPC · JPL
376243	2011 EA_{69}	—	March 15, 2007	Mount Lemmon	Mount Lemmon Survey	·	2.7 km	MPC · JPL
376244	2011 EM_{73}	—	December 14, 2006	Kitt Peak	Spacewatch	NYS	1.4 km	MPC · JPL
376245	2011 ES_{75}	—	March 29, 2007	Kitt Peak	Spacewatch	·	1.2 km	MPC · JPL
376246	2011 ES_{77}	—	April 16, 2007	Catalina	CSS	·	1.5 km	MPC · JPL
376247	2011 EK_{81}	—	October 29, 2005	Kitt Peak	Spacewatch	·	1.2 km	MPC · JPL
376248	2011 EU_{82}	—	September 16, 2009	Kitt Peak	Spacewatch	PHO	880 m	MPC · JPL
376249	2011 EL_{83}	—	January 22, 2006	Mount Lemmon	Mount Lemmon Survey	AST	2.9 km	MPC · JPL
376250	2011 ES_{83}	—	March 4, 2005	Mount Lemmon	Mount Lemmon Survey	THM	2.9 km	MPC · JPL
376251	2011 EF_{84}	—	December 28, 2005	Kitt Peak	Spacewatch	PAD	1.7 km	MPC · JPL
376252	2011 EV_{85}	—	April 18, 2007	Kitt Peak	Spacewatch	WIT	1.5 km	MPC · JPL
376253	2011 FV_{1}	—	April 18, 2007	Mount Lemmon	Mount Lemmon Survey	·	2.7 km	MPC · JPL
376254	2011 FW_{1}	—	September 28, 2008	Mount Lemmon	Mount Lemmon Survey	·	2.1 km	MPC · JPL
376255	2011 FB_{2}	—	April 7, 2010	WISE	WISE	·	4.0 km	MPC · JPL
376256	2011 FU_{2}	—	November 6, 2005	Catalina	CSS	(194)	1.6 km	MPC · JPL
376257	2011 FC_{6}	—	December 11, 2004	Kitt Peak	Spacewatch	·	2.6 km	MPC · JPL
376258	2011 FS_{7}	—	October 11, 2004	Kitt Peak	Spacewatch	·	2.2 km	MPC · JPL
376259	2011 FY_{7}	—	January 29, 1995	Kitt Peak	Spacewatch	·	2.0 km	MPC · JPL
376260	2011 FF_{10}	—	March 20, 2010	WISE	WISE	·	2.7 km	MPC · JPL
376261	2011 FX_{13}	—	April 25, 2000	Anderson Mesa	LONEOS	·	4.7 km	MPC · JPL
376262	2011 FJ_{18}	—	December 19, 2001	Socorro	LINEAR	(5)	1.6 km	MPC · JPL
376263	2011 FR_{18}	—	October 4, 2004	Kitt Peak	Spacewatch	·	1.7 km	MPC · JPL
376264	2011 FD_{19}	—	March 3, 2005	Catalina	CSS	·	3.7 km	MPC · JPL
376265	2011 FO_{21}	—	January 31, 1995	Kitt Peak	Spacewatch	·	2.5 km	MPC · JPL
376266	2011 FJ_{24}	—	September 24, 2008	Kitt Peak	Spacewatch	·	2.2 km	MPC · JPL
376267	2011 FW_{24}	—	September 24, 2008	Mount Lemmon	Mount Lemmon Survey	EOS	3.0 km	MPC · JPL
376268	2011 FT_{28}	—	January 6, 2010	Mount Lemmon	Mount Lemmon Survey	·	4.5 km	MPC · JPL
376269	2011 FG_{32}	—	April 1, 2000	Kitt Peak	Spacewatch	·	2.7 km	MPC · JPL
376270	2011 FQ_{41}	—	December 17, 2009	Mount Lemmon	Mount Lemmon Survey	·	4.4 km	MPC · JPL
376271	2011 FX_{43}	—	April 4, 2003	Kitt Peak	Spacewatch	·	1.1 km	MPC · JPL
376272	2011 FY_{43}	—	January 23, 2006	Kitt Peak	Spacewatch	·	2.5 km	MPC · JPL
376273	2011 FG_{44}	—	March 13, 2007	Mount Lemmon	Mount Lemmon Survey	·	1.6 km	MPC · JPL
376274	2011 FQ_{45}	—	October 1, 2008	Kitt Peak	Spacewatch	HYG	2.8 km	MPC · JPL
376275	2011 FM_{47}	—	October 10, 2007	Kitt Peak	Spacewatch	·	3.9 km	MPC · JPL
376276	2011 FW_{55}	—	January 23, 2006	Kitt Peak	Spacewatch	·	2.5 km	MPC · JPL
376277	2011 FG_{62}	—	February 2, 2006	Mount Lemmon	Mount Lemmon Survey	·	2.1 km	MPC · JPL
376278	2011 FB_{71}	—	January 25, 2006	Kitt Peak	Spacewatch	AST	1.7 km	MPC · JPL
376279	2011 FT_{72}	—	November 17, 2009	Kitt Peak	Spacewatch	·	1.7 km	MPC · JPL
376280	2011 FO_{73}	—	September 16, 2009	Kitt Peak	Spacewatch	(5)	990 m	MPC · JPL
376281	2011 FS_{73}	—	January 29, 2011	Kitt Peak	Spacewatch	·	1.9 km	MPC · JPL
376282	2011 FH_{74}	—	October 23, 2008	Kitt Peak	Spacewatch	THM	2.6 km	MPC · JPL
376283	2011 FR_{77}	—	October 9, 2004	Kitt Peak	Spacewatch	·	1.8 km	MPC · JPL
376284	2011 FO_{78}	—	October 15, 2004	Mount Lemmon	Mount Lemmon Survey	·	2.7 km	MPC · JPL
376285	2011 FH_{79}	—	January 8, 2006	Mount Lemmon	Mount Lemmon Survey	WIT	1.1 km	MPC · JPL
376286	2011 FD_{80}	—	September 28, 2009	Mount Lemmon	Mount Lemmon Survey	·	1.7 km	MPC · JPL
376287	2011 FH_{82}	—	May 23, 2006	Kitt Peak	Spacewatch	·	3.3 km	MPC · JPL
376288	2011 FW_{82}	—	October 1, 2003	Kitt Peak	Spacewatch	·	2.3 km	MPC · JPL
376289	2011 FL_{83}	—	January 26, 2006	Kitt Peak	Spacewatch	·	1.7 km	MPC · JPL
376290	2011 FT_{89}	—	March 26, 2007	Mount Lemmon	Mount Lemmon Survey	·	2.8 km	MPC · JPL
376291	2011 FG_{90}	—	February 25, 2006	Kitt Peak	Spacewatch	·	2.2 km	MPC · JPL
376292	2011 FY_{97}	—	September 11, 2004	Kitt Peak	Spacewatch	·	2.0 km	MPC · JPL
376293	2011 FK_{101}	—	September 22, 2008	Kitt Peak	Spacewatch	·	2.0 km	MPC · JPL
376294	2011 FJ_{102}	—	October 4, 1994	Kitt Peak	Spacewatch	BRA	1.7 km	MPC · JPL
376295	2011 FE_{108}	—	January 30, 2006	Catalina	CSS	·	2.3 km	MPC · JPL
376296	2011 FA_{125}	—	February 1, 2005	Kitt Peak	Spacewatch	·	3.7 km	MPC · JPL
376297	2011 FL_{131}	—	November 20, 2001	Socorro	LINEAR	fast	1.1 km	MPC · JPL
376298	2011 FH_{132}	—	November 25, 2005	Catalina	CSS	·	3.6 km	MPC · JPL
376299 Friesen	2011 FC_{138}	Friesen	December 15, 2004	Mauna Kea	P. A. Wiegert, D. D. Balam	KOR	1.2 km	MPC · JPL
376300	2011 FX_{140}	—	March 15, 2007	Mount Lemmon	Mount Lemmon Survey	·	1.7 km	MPC · JPL

== 376301–376400 ==
back to top

Designation			Discovery			Properties		Ref
Permanent	Provisional	Named after	Date	Site	Discoverer(s)	Category	Diam.	Ref
376301	2011 FY_{142}	—	October 12, 1999	Kitt Peak	Spacewatch	GEF	1.4 km	MPC · JPL
376302	2011 FF_{147}	—	March 25, 2006	Mount Lemmon	Mount Lemmon Survey	·	2.5 km	MPC · JPL
376303	2011 FK_{148}	—	September 14, 2007	Mauna Kea	P. A. Wiegert	T_{j} (2.94)	4.1 km	MPC · JPL
376304	2011 FU_{149}	—	March 13, 2010	WISE	WISE	·	4.2 km	MPC · JPL
376305	2011 FH_{150}	—	February 1, 2006	Catalina	CSS	·	2.8 km	MPC · JPL
376306	2011 FW_{157}	—	November 11, 2009	Mount Lemmon	Mount Lemmon Survey	·	4.9 km	MPC · JPL
376307	2011 FX_{157}	—	April 11, 2007	Kitt Peak	Spacewatch	·	2.3 km	MPC · JPL
376308	2011 GD_{4}	—	November 9, 1999	Socorro	LINEAR	·	2.8 km	MPC · JPL
376309	2011 GN_{6}	—	January 25, 2006	Kitt Peak	Spacewatch	·	2.4 km	MPC · JPL
376310	2011 GU_{14}	—	October 8, 2008	Mount Lemmon	Mount Lemmon Survey	EOS	2.2 km	MPC · JPL
376311 Naidubezawada	2011 GE_{21}	Naidubezawada	March 3, 2000	Anderson Mesa	Wasserman, L. H.	·	2.9 km	MPC · JPL
376312	2011 GV_{28}	—	October 24, 2005	Mauna Kea	A. Boattini	HOF	3.1 km	MPC · JPL
376313	2011 GZ_{30}	—	November 7, 2008	Mount Lemmon	Mount Lemmon Survey	·	3.5 km	MPC · JPL
376314	2011 GA_{32}	—	November 27, 2009	Mount Lemmon	Mount Lemmon Survey	EUN	1.6 km	MPC · JPL
376315	2011 GE_{32}	—	November 10, 2004	Kitt Peak	Spacewatch	·	2.0 km	MPC · JPL
376316	2011 GZ_{33}	—	September 29, 2008	Kitt Peak	Spacewatch	·	1.9 km	MPC · JPL
376317	2011 GC_{34}	—	October 7, 2004	Kitt Peak	Spacewatch	·	1.9 km	MPC · JPL
376318	2011 GX_{36}	—	May 22, 2003	Kitt Peak	Spacewatch	HNS	1.3 km	MPC · JPL
376319	2011 GJ_{45}	—	November 6, 2005	Mount Lemmon	Mount Lemmon Survey	(5)	1.3 km	MPC · JPL
376320	2011 GW_{45}	—	May 5, 2006	Kitt Peak	Spacewatch	·	2.7 km	MPC · JPL
376321	2011 GF_{47}	—	April 22, 1998	Kitt Peak	Spacewatch	EUN	1.5 km	MPC · JPL
376322	2011 GX_{47}	—	August 24, 2008	Kitt Peak	Spacewatch	·	2.0 km	MPC · JPL
376323	2011 GE_{48}	—	March 5, 2006	Kitt Peak	Spacewatch	HOF	2.9 km	MPC · JPL
376324	2011 GN_{49}	—	March 3, 2000	Kitt Peak	Spacewatch	·	2.0 km	MPC · JPL
376325	2011 GV_{49}	—	October 4, 2004	Kitt Peak	Spacewatch	·	1.7 km	MPC · JPL
376326	2011 GE_{50}	—	May 12, 2007	Kitt Peak	Spacewatch	PAD	2.5 km	MPC · JPL
376327	2011 GM_{61}	—	May 10, 2007	Mount Lemmon	Mount Lemmon Survey	·	2.4 km	MPC · JPL
376328	2011 GS_{63}	—	March 10, 2005	Anderson Mesa	LONEOS	LIX	4.9 km	MPC · JPL
376329	2011 GP_{67}	—	April 22, 2007	Kitt Peak	Spacewatch	EUN	1.6 km	MPC · JPL
376330	2011 GY_{72}	—	September 19, 2007	Kitt Peak	Spacewatch	·	3.2 km	MPC · JPL
376331	2011 GY_{74}	—	April 29, 2000	Kitt Peak	Spacewatch	·	4.0 km	MPC · JPL
376332	2011 GO_{75}	—	August 21, 2007	Siding Spring	SSS	·	4.3 km	MPC · JPL
376333	2011 GW_{75}	—	March 2, 1997	Kitt Peak	Spacewatch	·	2.4 km	MPC · JPL
376334	2011 GM_{77}	—	September 28, 2003	Kitt Peak	Spacewatch	·	2.2 km	MPC · JPL
376335	2011 GG_{79}	—	September 1, 2005	Kitt Peak	Spacewatch	3:2	4.7 km	MPC · JPL
376336	2011 GS_{80}	—	April 12, 2000	Kitt Peak	Spacewatch	THM	2.3 km	MPC · JPL
376337	2011 GT_{84}	—	March 13, 2005	Kitt Peak	Spacewatch	·	3.2 km	MPC · JPL
376338	2011 GW_{85}	—	March 11, 2005	Mount Lemmon	Mount Lemmon Survey	·	2.7 km	MPC · JPL
376339	2011 HJ_{14}	—	October 4, 2004	Kitt Peak	Spacewatch	·	3.9 km	MPC · JPL
376340	2011 HD_{15}	—	October 7, 2008	Mount Lemmon	Mount Lemmon Survey	·	2.9 km	MPC · JPL
376341	2011 HT_{16}	—	October 9, 2004	Kitt Peak	Spacewatch	·	2.3 km	MPC · JPL
376342	2011 HU_{20}	—	September 6, 1999	Kitt Peak	Spacewatch	CYB	4.8 km	MPC · JPL
376343	2011 HY_{23}	—	January 12, 2010	Catalina	CSS	·	3.0 km	MPC · JPL
376344	2011 HL_{27}	—	April 26, 2010	WISE	WISE	EOS	4.6 km	MPC · JPL
376345	2011 HS_{31}	—	October 6, 1999	Kitt Peak	Spacewatch	MRX	1.3 km	MPC · JPL
376346	2011 HG_{36}	—	December 11, 2004	Kitt Peak	Spacewatch	·	2.0 km	MPC · JPL
376347	2011 HM_{36}	—	May 22, 2006	Kitt Peak	Spacewatch	·	2.8 km	MPC · JPL
376348	2011 HZ_{40}	—	December 17, 2003	Socorro	LINEAR	·	4.5 km	MPC · JPL
376349	2011 HU_{42}	—	January 19, 2005	Kitt Peak	Spacewatch	TEL	1.4 km	MPC · JPL
376350	2011 HE_{51}	—	December 19, 2009	Mount Lemmon	Mount Lemmon Survey	·	2.8 km	MPC · JPL
376351	2011 HK_{64}	—	December 20, 2009	Mount Lemmon	Mount Lemmon Survey	·	2.1 km	MPC · JPL
376352	2011 HE_{66}	—	July 30, 2008	Mount Lemmon	Mount Lemmon Survey	·	2.6 km	MPC · JPL
376353	2011 HB_{78}	—	April 30, 2006	Kitt Peak	Spacewatch	·	2.4 km	MPC · JPL
376354	2011 HQ_{80}	—	January 8, 2010	Kitt Peak	Spacewatch	·	3.4 km	MPC · JPL
376355	2011 HE_{81}	—	December 6, 2005	Kitt Peak	Spacewatch	·	1.7 km	MPC · JPL
376356	2011 HE_{84}	—	March 13, 2005	Kitt Peak	Spacewatch	·	3.6 km	MPC · JPL
376357	2011 HQ_{93}	—	May 8, 2006	Kitt Peak	Spacewatch	·	1.9 km	MPC · JPL
376358	2011 JO_{5}	—	November 5, 2004	Campo Imperatore	CINEOS	·	3.2 km	MPC · JPL
376359	2011 JL_{16}	—	December 14, 1998	Kitt Peak	Spacewatch	·	3.6 km	MPC · JPL
376360	2011 JL_{21}	—	May 27, 2006	Kitt Peak	Spacewatch	EOS	2.0 km	MPC · JPL
376361	2011 JG_{27}	—	September 20, 2009	Mount Lemmon	Mount Lemmon Survey	·	2.3 km	MPC · JPL
376362	2011 JH_{31}	—	August 28, 2009	Kitt Peak	Spacewatch	·	3.4 km	MPC · JPL
376363	2011 KV_{4}	—	June 3, 2010	WISE	WISE	·	4.4 km	MPC · JPL
376364	2011 KG_{9}	—	February 14, 2010	Kitt Peak	Spacewatch	3:2 · SHU	5.7 km	MPC · JPL
376365	2011 KG_{42}	—	October 4, 1999	Kitt Peak	Spacewatch	·	2.9 km	MPC · JPL
376366	2011 KB_{43}	—	November 6, 2005	Mount Lemmon	Mount Lemmon Survey	·	1.1 km	MPC · JPL
376367	2011 KM_{43}	—	May 4, 2005	Kitt Peak	Spacewatch	·	3.9 km	MPC · JPL
376368	2011 KY_{47}	—	August 24, 2007	Kitt Peak	Spacewatch	·	3.6 km	MPC · JPL
376369	2011 LH_{15}	—	November 27, 2000	Kitt Peak	Spacewatch	EUN	1.7 km	MPC · JPL
376370	2011 OX_{26}	—	January 10, 2006	Mount Lemmon	Mount Lemmon Survey	L5	10 km	MPC · JPL
376371	2011 OU_{44}	—	July 5, 2011	Westfield	Astronomical Research Observatory	L5	8.0 km	MPC · JPL
376372	2011 QU_{70}	—	September 24, 2000	Socorro	LINEAR	·	1.0 km	MPC · JPL
376373	2011 SV_{21}	—	December 19, 2004	Mount Lemmon	Mount Lemmon Survey	L5	10 km	MPC · JPL
376374	2011 UC_{202}	—	February 4, 2003	La Silla	Barbieri, C.	·	1.9 km	MPC · JPL
376375	2012 CB_{55}	—	May 13, 2007	Mount Lemmon	Mount Lemmon Survey	H	670 m	MPC · JPL
376376	2012 DR_{8}	—	September 6, 2008	Siding Spring	SSS	H	580 m	MPC · JPL
376377	2012 DK_{16}	—	December 6, 2007	Kitt Peak	Spacewatch	V	670 m	MPC · JPL
376378	2012 DP_{18}	—	November 4, 2007	Kitt Peak	Spacewatch	·	770 m	MPC · JPL
376379	2012 DU_{24}	—	April 16, 2004	Kitt Peak	Spacewatch	·	1.2 km	MPC · JPL
376380	2012 DP_{25}	—	September 22, 2009	Kitt Peak	Spacewatch	·	2.0 km	MPC · JPL
376381	2012 DQ_{29}	—	March 24, 2009	Kitt Peak	Spacewatch	·	930 m	MPC · JPL
376382	2012 DE_{30}	—	September 27, 2003	Kitt Peak	Spacewatch	·	870 m	MPC · JPL
376383	2012 DO_{33}	—	September 18, 2010	Mount Lemmon	Mount Lemmon Survey	·	730 m	MPC · JPL
376384	2012 DB_{40}	—	June 6, 2005	Kitt Peak	Spacewatch	·	1.2 km	MPC · JPL
376385	2012 DU_{43}	—	September 30, 2005	Anderson Mesa	LONEOS	H	780 m	MPC · JPL
376386	2012 DS_{52}	—	February 8, 2008	Mount Lemmon	Mount Lemmon Survey	·	1.2 km	MPC · JPL
376387	2012 DL_{60}	—	February 26, 2008	Kitt Peak	Spacewatch	MAS	670 m	MPC · JPL
376388	2012 DH_{82}	—	January 13, 2005	Kitt Peak	Spacewatch	·	850 m	MPC · JPL
376389	2012 DD_{88}	—	September 21, 2003	Kitt Peak	Spacewatch	·	800 m	MPC · JPL
376390	2012 DG_{90}	—	March 8, 2005	Siding Spring	SSS	PHO	1.6 km	MPC · JPL
376391	2012 EE_{1}	—	February 7, 2002	Kitt Peak	Spacewatch	·	750 m	MPC · JPL
376392	2012 EX_{10}	—	May 23, 1999	Kitt Peak	Spacewatch	·	740 m	MPC · JPL
376393	2012 FS_{2}	—	November 27, 2006	Mount Lemmon	Mount Lemmon Survey	MAS	840 m	MPC · JPL
376394	2012 FM_{10}	—	March 3, 2005	Catalina	CSS	·	830 m	MPC · JPL
376395	2012 FP_{14}	—	November 18, 2007	Mount Lemmon	Mount Lemmon Survey	·	1.1 km	MPC · JPL
376396	2012 FK_{24}	—	January 18, 2008	Kitt Peak	Spacewatch	·	1.1 km	MPC · JPL
376397	2012 FB_{26}	—	March 8, 2005	Mount Lemmon	Mount Lemmon Survey	·	920 m	MPC · JPL
376398	2012 FR_{27}	—	June 8, 2002	Socorro	LINEAR	(2076)	830 m	MPC · JPL
376399	2012 FW_{29}	—	March 11, 2005	Kitt Peak	Spacewatch	·	830 m	MPC · JPL
376400	2012 FM_{31}	—	July 4, 2005	Siding Spring	SSS	·	1.6 km	MPC · JPL

== 376401–376500 ==
back to top

Designation			Discovery			Properties		Ref
Permanent	Provisional	Named after	Date	Site	Discoverer(s)	Category	Diam.	Ref
376401	2012 FJ_{44}	—	March 13, 2005	Kitt Peak	Spacewatch	·	640 m	MPC · JPL
376402	2012 FZ_{53}	—	February 27, 2012	Haleakala	Pan-STARRS 1	V	840 m	MPC · JPL
376403	2012 FP_{54}	—	October 26, 2005	Kitt Peak	Spacewatch	BRG	1.6 km	MPC · JPL
376404	2012 FG_{59}	—	October 9, 2007	Mount Lemmon	Mount Lemmon Survey	·	680 m	MPC · JPL
376405	2012 FB_{62}	—	September 26, 2009	Kitt Peak	Spacewatch	·	2.0 km	MPC · JPL
376406	2012 FC_{62}	—	September 8, 2004	Socorro	LINEAR	(1547)	2.2 km	MPC · JPL
376407	2012 FJ_{67}	—	April 24, 2001	Kitt Peak	Spacewatch	MAS	750 m	MPC · JPL
376408	2012 FD_{69}	—	February 2, 2008	Kitt Peak	Spacewatch	·	1.1 km	MPC · JPL
376409	2012 FE_{69}	—	March 15, 2008	Mount Lemmon	Mount Lemmon Survey	·	1.3 km	MPC · JPL
376410	2012 FB_{75}	—	September 25, 2006	Kitt Peak	Spacewatch	·	940 m	MPC · JPL
376411	2012 FP_{81}	—	April 2, 2002	Kitt Peak	Spacewatch	·	830 m	MPC · JPL
376412	2012 GJ_{2}	—	October 8, 1994	Kitt Peak	Spacewatch	·	1.5 km	MPC · JPL
376413	2012 GK_{10}	—	May 4, 2008	Kitt Peak	Spacewatch	·	960 m	MPC · JPL
376414	2012 GN_{10}	—	September 29, 2003	Kitt Peak	Spacewatch	·	700 m	MPC · JPL
376415	2012 GB_{13}	—	September 24, 2000	Socorro	LINEAR	·	2.1 km	MPC · JPL
376416	2012 GH_{13}	—	January 15, 2004	Kitt Peak	Spacewatch	NYS	1.4 km	MPC · JPL
376417	2012 GQ_{21}	—	September 5, 2010	Mount Lemmon	Mount Lemmon Survey	·	860 m	MPC · JPL
376418	2012 GJ_{23}	—	October 20, 2006	Mount Lemmon	Mount Lemmon Survey	·	1.3 km	MPC · JPL
376419	2012 GX_{25}	—	November 3, 2005	Kitt Peak	Spacewatch	·	1.9 km	MPC · JPL
376420	2012 GY_{28}	—	October 2, 2009	Mount Lemmon	Mount Lemmon Survey	·	2.1 km	MPC · JPL
376421	2012 GO_{31}	—	February 11, 2011	Mount Lemmon	Mount Lemmon Survey	·	2.1 km	MPC · JPL
376422	2012 GP_{31}	—	March 11, 2005	Kitt Peak	Spacewatch	·	660 m	MPC · JPL
376423	2012 GS_{31}	—	November 18, 2006	Kitt Peak	Spacewatch	NYS	1.3 km	MPC · JPL
376424	2012 GF_{32}	—	September 25, 2009	Mount Lemmon	Mount Lemmon Survey	·	1.2 km	MPC · JPL
376425	2012 GB_{35}	—	February 21, 2007	Kitt Peak	Spacewatch	AEO	1.1 km	MPC · JPL
376426	2012 HF_{7}	—	May 8, 2005	Kitt Peak	Spacewatch	V	670 m	MPC · JPL
376427	2012 HO_{7}	—	August 19, 2006	Kitt Peak	Spacewatch	·	600 m	MPC · JPL
376428	2012 HQ_{7}	—	February 24, 2008	Mount Lemmon	Mount Lemmon Survey	MAS	740 m	MPC · JPL
376429	2012 HS_{7}	—	April 12, 2012	Kitt Peak	Spacewatch	·	1.7 km	MPC · JPL
376430	2012 HF_{9}	—	February 23, 2007	Kitt Peak	Spacewatch	·	2.3 km	MPC · JPL
376431	2012 HZ_{10}	—	September 19, 2009	Mount Lemmon	Mount Lemmon Survey	JUN	1.3 km	MPC · JPL
376432	2012 HB_{14}	—	November 14, 2006	Kitt Peak	Spacewatch	NYS	1.2 km	MPC · JPL
376433	2012 HZ_{15}	—	April 18, 2012	Mount Lemmon	Mount Lemmon Survey	·	1.6 km	MPC · JPL
376434	2012 HF_{16}	—	November 20, 2001	Socorro	LINEAR	·	1.3 km	MPC · JPL
376435	2012 HL_{19}	—	March 10, 2005	Catalina	CSS	·	860 m	MPC · JPL
376436	2012 HF_{28}	—	January 25, 2006	Kitt Peak	Spacewatch	·	2.7 km	MPC · JPL
376437	2012 HR_{28}	—	March 31, 2008	Mount Lemmon	Mount Lemmon Survey	·	1.3 km	MPC · JPL
376438	2012 HO_{31}	—	October 8, 2005	Anderson Mesa	LONEOS	·	3.2 km	MPC · JPL
376439	2012 HK_{35}	—	March 3, 2005	Catalina	CSS	·	800 m	MPC · JPL
376440	2012 HT_{37}	—	October 25, 2005	Kitt Peak	Spacewatch	·	1.5 km	MPC · JPL
376441	2012 HR_{39}	—	October 19, 2003	Kitt Peak	Spacewatch	·	1 km	MPC · JPL
376442	2012 HM_{40}	—	January 6, 2012	Haleakala	Pan-STARRS 1	EUN	1.5 km	MPC · JPL
376443	2012 HS_{44}	—	October 15, 2004	Mount Lemmon	Mount Lemmon Survey	DOR	2.7 km	MPC · JPL
376444	2012 HC_{45}	—	November 11, 2001	Kitt Peak	Spacewatch	·	1.8 km	MPC · JPL
376445	2012 HT_{48}	—	May 23, 1998	Kitt Peak	Spacewatch	·	2.8 km	MPC · JPL
376446	2012 HD_{50}	—	April 25, 2003	Anderson Mesa	LONEOS	·	2.5 km	MPC · JPL
376447	2012 HF_{50}	—	November 17, 2004	Campo Imperatore	CINEOS	DOR	3.0 km	MPC · JPL
376448	2012 HX_{56}	—	February 8, 2008	Mount Lemmon	Mount Lemmon Survey	·	1.2 km	MPC · JPL
376449	2012 HH_{57}	—	March 24, 2012	Kitt Peak	Spacewatch	·	1.7 km	MPC · JPL
376450	2012 HG_{60}	—	March 27, 2008	Mount Lemmon	Mount Lemmon Survey	·	1.4 km	MPC · JPL
376451	2012 HW_{62}	—	February 3, 2008	Kitt Peak	Spacewatch	NYS	1.2 km	MPC · JPL
376452	2012 HO_{63}	—	October 1, 2005	Mount Lemmon	Mount Lemmon Survey	·	1.9 km	MPC · JPL
376453	2012 HY_{63}	—	November 12, 2005	Kitt Peak	Spacewatch	·	1.3 km	MPC · JPL
376454	2012 HE_{64}	—	February 22, 2001	Kitt Peak	Spacewatch	NYS	1.1 km	MPC · JPL
376455	2012 HU_{66}	—	November 10, 2004	Kitt Peak	Spacewatch	·	2.1 km	MPC · JPL
376456	2012 HF_{67}	—	February 27, 2006	Mount Lemmon	Mount Lemmon Survey	EMA	2.6 km	MPC · JPL
376457	2012 HS_{70}	—	January 9, 2007	Mount Lemmon	Mount Lemmon Survey	·	1.6 km	MPC · JPL
376458	2012 HD_{71}	—	October 28, 2005	Mount Lemmon	Mount Lemmon Survey	(5)	1.1 km	MPC · JPL
376459	2012 HS_{73}	—	October 18, 2009	Mount Lemmon	Mount Lemmon Survey	·	1.5 km	MPC · JPL
376460	2012 HJ_{74}	—	April 8, 2008	Mount Lemmon	Mount Lemmon Survey	·	1.4 km	MPC · JPL
376461	2012 HU_{78}	—	March 14, 2007	Kitt Peak	Spacewatch	(13314)	1.8 km	MPC · JPL
376462	2012 HM_{79}	—	September 15, 2004	Kitt Peak	Spacewatch	·	1.5 km	MPC · JPL
376463	2012 JQ_{2}	—	October 23, 2009	Kitt Peak	Spacewatch	ADE	2.1 km	MPC · JPL
376464	2012 JD_{8}	—	September 22, 2009	Mount Lemmon	Mount Lemmon Survey	·	2.1 km	MPC · JPL
376465	2012 JC_{13}	—	March 11, 2007	Kitt Peak	Spacewatch	·	1.9 km	MPC · JPL
376466	2012 JH_{13}	—	November 1, 2005	Mount Lemmon	Mount Lemmon Survey	·	2.1 km	MPC · JPL
376467	2012 JL_{16}	—	August 31, 2005	Kitt Peak	Spacewatch	MAR	1.1 km	MPC · JPL
376468	2012 JU_{17}	—	February 5, 2011	Mount Lemmon	Mount Lemmon Survey	·	2.2 km	MPC · JPL
376469	2012 JG_{19}	—	November 25, 2005	Mount Lemmon	Mount Lemmon Survey	·	1.5 km	MPC · JPL
376470	2012 JK_{19}	—	February 27, 2006	Kitt Peak	Spacewatch	·	3.4 km	MPC · JPL
376471	2012 JN_{20}	—	October 14, 2010	Mount Lemmon	Mount Lemmon Survey	·	980 m	MPC · JPL
376472	2012 JF_{26}	—	September 24, 2009	Kitt Peak	Spacewatch	·	2.0 km	MPC · JPL
376473	2012 JH_{27}	—	January 7, 2006	Mount Lemmon	Mount Lemmon Survey	526	3.1 km	MPC · JPL
376474	2012 JY_{27}	—	September 14, 2007	Anderson Mesa	LONEOS	T_{j} (2.98)	3.4 km	MPC · JPL
376475	2012 JY_{31}	—	December 8, 2004	Socorro	LINEAR	·	2.7 km	MPC · JPL
376476	2012 JM_{32}	—	March 5, 2006	Kitt Peak	Spacewatch	AEG	2.9 km	MPC · JPL
376477	2012 JK_{38}	—	April 30, 2003	Kitt Peak	Spacewatch	·	1.6 km	MPC · JPL
376478	2012 JU_{45}	—	August 22, 2007	Anderson Mesa	LONEOS	·	3.5 km	MPC · JPL
376479	2012 JP_{53}	—	October 30, 2005	Kitt Peak	Spacewatch	·	2.0 km	MPC · JPL
376480	2012 JE_{54}	—	September 13, 2005	Kitt Peak	Spacewatch	·	790 m	MPC · JPL
376481	2012 JS_{54}	—	March 6, 2008	Mount Lemmon	Mount Lemmon Survey	·	770 m	MPC · JPL
376482	2012 JN_{58}	—	December 15, 2006	Kitt Peak	Spacewatch	·	1.6 km	MPC · JPL
376483	2012 JX_{62}	—	September 24, 2009	Mount Lemmon	Mount Lemmon Survey	·	1.4 km	MPC · JPL
376484	2012 JR_{65}	—	September 29, 2008	Kitt Peak	Spacewatch	·	2.0 km	MPC · JPL
376485	2012 JZ_{66}	—	April 17, 1998	Kitt Peak	Spacewatch	·	850 m	MPC · JPL
376486	2012 KU_{1}	—	November 1, 2005	Mount Lemmon	Mount Lemmon Survey	·	1.7 km	MPC · JPL
376487	2012 KN_{2}	—	March 5, 2006	Kitt Peak	Spacewatch	·	3.0 km	MPC · JPL
376488	2012 KR_{8}	—	April 1, 2008	Kitt Peak	Spacewatch	L5	10 km	MPC · JPL
376489	2012 KB_{10}	—	November 4, 2005	Kitt Peak	Spacewatch	·	2.1 km	MPC · JPL
376490	2012 KF_{10}	—	October 12, 2009	Mount Lemmon	Mount Lemmon Survey	·	1.8 km	MPC · JPL
376491	2012 KR_{11}	—	October 31, 2002	Palomar	NEAT	·	4.1 km	MPC · JPL
376492	2012 KV_{13}	—	April 5, 2008	Mount Lemmon	Mount Lemmon Survey	·	1.2 km	MPC · JPL
376493	2012 KG_{15}	—	September 17, 2004	Pla D'Arguines	R. Ferrando	·	1.8 km	MPC · JPL
376494	2012 KJ_{21}	—	September 25, 2005	Kitt Peak	Spacewatch	·	1.0 km	MPC · JPL
376495	2012 KJ_{27}	—	September 29, 2009	Mount Lemmon	Mount Lemmon Survey	·	1.7 km	MPC · JPL
376496	2012 KP_{29}	—	September 12, 2005	Kitt Peak	Spacewatch	·	1.2 km	MPC · JPL
376497	2012 KT_{29}	—	March 13, 2005	Catalina	CSS	·	720 m	MPC · JPL
376498	2012 KP_{38}	—	July 30, 2008	Siding Spring	SSS	·	2.3 km	MPC · JPL
376499	2012 KL_{40}	—	November 25, 2009	Mount Lemmon	Mount Lemmon Survey	KON	2.1 km	MPC · JPL
376500	2012 KD_{41}	—	April 19, 2006	Kitt Peak	Spacewatch	·	2.9 km	MPC · JPL

== 376501–376600 ==
back to top

Designation			Discovery			Properties		Ref
Permanent	Provisional	Named after	Date	Site	Discoverer(s)	Category	Diam.	Ref
376501	2012 KN_{42}	—	October 20, 2003	Kitt Peak	Spacewatch	·	5.9 km	MPC · JPL
376502	2012 KY_{45}	—	September 9, 1999	Socorro	LINEAR	·	2.2 km	MPC · JPL
376503	2012 KN_{46}	—	June 16, 2004	Kitt Peak	Spacewatch	·	3.0 km	MPC · JPL
376504	2012 KT_{46}	—	June 3, 2003	Socorro	LINEAR	·	4.5 km	MPC · JPL
376505	2012 KM_{47}	—	September 5, 2007	Anderson Mesa	LONEOS	T_{j} (2.99)	3.2 km	MPC · JPL
376506	2012 KK_{48}	—	April 18, 1998	Kitt Peak	Spacewatch	·	1.9 km	MPC · JPL
376507	2012 KT_{48}	—	November 10, 2005	Mount Lemmon	Mount Lemmon Survey	WIT	1.2 km	MPC · JPL
376508	2012 KY_{48}	—	January 28, 2006	Mount Lemmon	Mount Lemmon Survey	HOF	2.8 km	MPC · JPL
376509	2012 KG_{49}	—	January 15, 2004	Kitt Peak	Spacewatch	NYS	1.1 km	MPC · JPL
376510	2012 KG_{51}	—	April 19, 2012	Mount Lemmon	Mount Lemmon Survey	BRA	1.5 km	MPC · JPL
376511	2012 LQ	—	February 16, 2004	Kitt Peak	Spacewatch	V	840 m	MPC · JPL
376512	2012 LG_{2}	—	April 2, 2006	Kitt Peak	Spacewatch	THB	3.1 km	MPC · JPL
376513	2012 LG_{3}	—	November 20, 2001	Socorro	LINEAR	·	2.1 km	MPC · JPL
376514	2012 LA_{5}	—	August 4, 2008	Siding Spring	SSS	·	2.1 km	MPC · JPL
376515	2012 LD_{7}	—	March 13, 2007	Kitt Peak	Spacewatch	·	1.9 km	MPC · JPL
376516	2012 LH_{8}	—	August 9, 2007	Dauban	C. Rinner, Kugel, F.	·	2.5 km	MPC · JPL
376517	2012 LU_{10}	—	June 10, 2004	Socorro	LINEAR	(194)	1.9 km	MPC · JPL
376518	2012 LQ_{19}	—	October 26, 2005	Kitt Peak	Spacewatch	·	1.7 km	MPC · JPL
376519	2012 LZ_{24}	—	April 2, 2010	WISE	WISE	·	3.4 km	MPC · JPL
376520	2012 LC_{25}	—	February 17, 2010	WISE	WISE	·	4.3 km	MPC · JPL
376521	2012 MU_{9}	—	May 30, 2000	Kitt Peak	Spacewatch	·	3.8 km	MPC · JPL
376522	2012 PN_{5}	—	May 9, 2006	Mount Lemmon	Mount Lemmon Survey	·	3.7 km	MPC · JPL
376523	2012 PK_{14}	—	January 30, 2006	Kitt Peak	Spacewatch	L5	9.0 km	MPC · JPL
376524	2012 PP_{20}	—	December 24, 1992	Kitt Peak	Spacewatch	·	3.7 km	MPC · JPL
376525	2012 PY_{37}	—	May 8, 2005	Mount Lemmon	Mount Lemmon Survey	·	3.5 km	MPC · JPL
376526	2012 QN_{16}	—	March 9, 2005	Mount Lemmon	Mount Lemmon Survey	L5	8.3 km	MPC · JPL
376527	2012 QX_{39}	—	January 17, 2005	Kitt Peak	Spacewatch	L5	8.4 km	MPC · JPL
376528	2012 QH_{40}	—	December 1, 2003	Kitt Peak	Spacewatch	L5	10 km	MPC · JPL
376529	2012 QP_{46}	—	December 1, 2008	Kitt Peak	Spacewatch	EOS	2.6 km	MPC · JPL
376530	2012 QN_{48}	—	March 14, 2005	Mount Lemmon	Mount Lemmon Survey	EOS	2.5 km	MPC · JPL
376531	2012 RA_{33}	—	February 4, 2006	Kitt Peak	Spacewatch	L5	10 km	MPC · JPL
376532	2012 SA_{24}	—	March 15, 2007	Kitt Peak	Spacewatch	L5	7.8 km	MPC · JPL
376533	2012 SF_{41}	—	August 30, 2000	Kitt Peak	Spacewatch	L5	9.7 km	MPC · JPL
376534	2012 SC_{59}	—	March 12, 2008	Mount Lemmon	Mount Lemmon Survey	L5	8.0 km	MPC · JPL
376535	2012 TL	—	March 11, 2007	Kitt Peak	Spacewatch	L5	10 km	MPC · JPL
376536	2012 TP	—	January 30, 2006	Kitt Peak	Spacewatch	L5	8.5 km	MPC · JPL
376537	2012 TW_{9}	—	March 21, 1993	La Silla	UESAC	HIL · 3:2	6.9 km	MPC · JPL
376538	2012 TO_{146}	—	March 15, 2007	Kitt Peak	Spacewatch	L5	10 km	MPC · JPL
376539	2012 TT_{146}	—	January 19, 2005	Kitt Peak	Spacewatch	L5	9.5 km	MPC · JPL
376540	2012 TR_{207}	—	June 8, 2005	Kitt Peak	Spacewatch	·	4.0 km	MPC · JPL
376541	2012 TQ_{320}	—	January 28, 2006	Catalina	CSS	·	2.4 km	MPC · JPL
376542	2013 AA_{4}	—	April 11, 2008	Mount Lemmon	Mount Lemmon Survey	L5	10 km	MPC · JPL
376543	2013 BB_{25}	—	March 26, 2003	Kitt Peak	Spacewatch	L4	9.2 km	MPC · JPL
376544	2013 EQ_{84}	—	April 11, 2008	Kitt Peak	Spacewatch	(1298)	3.3 km	MPC · JPL
376545	2013 EL_{127}	—	August 23, 2001	Anderson Mesa	LONEOS	·	1.7 km	MPC · JPL
376546	2013 HW_{28}	—	November 26, 2003	Kitt Peak	Spacewatch	·	1 km	MPC · JPL
376547	2013 HZ_{137}	—	September 14, 2005	Kitt Peak	Spacewatch	KOR	1.2 km	MPC · JPL
376548	2013 KH_{2}	—	November 25, 2005	Kitt Peak	Spacewatch	DOR	3.7 km	MPC · JPL
376549	2013 KJ_{2}	—	January 29, 2011	Kitt Peak	Spacewatch	·	3.6 km	MPC · JPL
376550	2013 MG_{4}	—	August 27, 1995	Kitt Peak	Spacewatch	·	1.1 km	MPC · JPL
376551	2013 NP_{3}	—	December 13, 2010	Kitt Peak	Spacewatch	·	1.6 km	MPC · JPL
376552	2013 NV_{15}	—	October 8, 2005	Catalina	CSS	·	1.7 km	MPC · JPL
376553	2013 NS_{22}	—	September 15, 2009	Catalina	CSS	·	2.4 km	MPC · JPL
376554	2013 OE_{9}	—	October 2, 2010	Mount Lemmon	Mount Lemmon Survey	·	800 m	MPC · JPL
376555	2013 OB_{10}	—	September 7, 1996	Kitt Peak	Spacewatch	T_{j} (2.98) · EUP	7.2 km	MPC · JPL
376556	2013 PX	—	October 5, 2004	Kitt Peak	Spacewatch	·	2.3 km	MPC · JPL
376557	2013 PC_{3}	—	September 5, 2002	Socorro	LINEAR	H	570 m	MPC · JPL
376558	2013 PQ_{3}	—	September 22, 2008	Kitt Peak	Spacewatch	·	3.1 km	MPC · JPL
376559	2013 PT_{5}	—	September 12, 2004	Kitt Peak	Spacewatch	·	2.2 km	MPC · JPL
376560	2013 PH_{7}	—	August 17, 2009	Kitt Peak	Spacewatch	·	4.0 km	MPC · JPL
376561	2013 PM_{9}	—	February 12, 2004	Kitt Peak	Spacewatch	V	780 m	MPC · JPL
376562	2013 PP_{9}	—	September 27, 2000	Kitt Peak	Spacewatch	·	650 m	MPC · JPL
376563	2013 PA_{10}	—	March 17, 2004	Kitt Peak	Spacewatch	·	1.5 km	MPC · JPL
376564	2013 PK_{10}	—	March 29, 2008	Kitt Peak	Spacewatch	·	1.5 km	MPC · JPL
376565	2013 PV_{11}	—	March 8, 2005	Mount Lemmon	Mount Lemmon Survey	·	4.2 km	MPC · JPL
376566	2013 PY_{12}	—	June 11, 2004	Kitt Peak	Spacewatch	·	1.5 km	MPC · JPL
376567	2013 PG_{13}	—	September 29, 1999	Catalina	CSS	TIN	1.4 km	MPC · JPL
376568	2013 PK_{13}	—	March 5, 2008	Mount Lemmon	Mount Lemmon Survey	·	1.6 km	MPC · JPL
376569	2013 PO_{13}	—	December 26, 2006	Kitt Peak	Spacewatch	·	2.1 km	MPC · JPL
376570	2013 PP_{13}	—	January 28, 2007	Mount Lemmon	Mount Lemmon Survey	·	4.1 km	MPC · JPL
376571	2013 PA_{14}	—	October 25, 2000	Socorro	LINEAR	·	660 m	MPC · JPL
376572	2013 PB_{14}	—	November 7, 2005	Mauna Kea	A. Boattini	·	2.1 km	MPC · JPL
376573	2013 PP_{14}	—	March 4, 2005	Kitt Peak	Spacewatch	·	3.6 km	MPC · JPL
376574 Michalkusiak	2013 PA_{16}	Michalkusiak	January 19, 2007	Pla D'Arguines	R. Ferrando	·	1.9 km	MPC · JPL
376575	2013 PB_{16}	—	October 7, 2004	Kitt Peak	Spacewatch	·	2.2 km	MPC · JPL
376576	2013 PD_{16}	—	October 10, 2005	Catalina	CSS	MAR	1.2 km	MPC · JPL
376577	2013 PH_{16}	—	April 7, 2008	Catalina	CSS	·	1.8 km	MPC · JPL
376578	2013 PC_{17}	—	October 21, 2006	Kitt Peak	Spacewatch	·	1.2 km	MPC · JPL
376579	2013 PO_{17}	—	August 12, 1994	La Silla	E. W. Elst	NYS	1.3 km	MPC · JPL
376580	2013 PQ_{17}	—	May 31, 2008	Mount Lemmon	Mount Lemmon Survey	·	2.2 km	MPC · JPL
376581	2013 PZ_{19}	—	September 5, 2002	Socorro	LINEAR	·	2.7 km	MPC · JPL
376582	2013 PQ_{21}	—	August 24, 2008	Kitt Peak	Spacewatch	·	2.2 km	MPC · JPL
376583	2013 PA_{22}	—	October 8, 2005	Kitt Peak	Spacewatch	·	1.2 km	MPC · JPL
376584	2013 PS_{23}	—	September 4, 1999	Kitt Peak	Spacewatch	HOF	2.6 km	MPC · JPL
376585	2013 PX_{23}	—	October 4, 2007	Mount Lemmon	Mount Lemmon Survey	·	3.5 km	MPC · JPL
376586	2013 PY_{24}	—	February 26, 2009	Kitt Peak	Spacewatch	·	1.1 km	MPC · JPL
376587	2013 PZ_{24}	—	March 10, 2005	Mount Lemmon	Mount Lemmon Survey	·	4.2 km	MPC · JPL
376588	2013 PE_{25}	—	December 10, 2005	Kitt Peak	Spacewatch	EUP	4.3 km	MPC · JPL
376589	2013 PX_{25}	—	October 23, 2008	Kitt Peak	Spacewatch	·	4.9 km	MPC · JPL
376590	2013 PB_{26}	—	October 15, 2001	Socorro	LINEAR	CYB	5.3 km	MPC · JPL
376591	2013 PV_{26}	—	December 27, 2006	Mount Lemmon	Mount Lemmon Survey	NYS	1.2 km	MPC · JPL
376592	2013 PX_{27}	—	October 7, 2010	Sandlot	G. Hug	·	850 m	MPC · JPL
376593	2013 PC_{28}	—	September 26, 2000	Socorro	LINEAR	·	740 m	MPC · JPL
376594	2013 PG_{28}	—	January 26, 2006	Kitt Peak	Spacewatch	·	2.0 km	MPC · JPL
376595	2013 PH_{28}	—	February 24, 2006	Mount Lemmon	Mount Lemmon Survey	·	1.8 km	MPC · JPL
376596	2013 PP_{28}	—	October 25, 2005	Kitt Peak	Spacewatch	·	970 m	MPC · JPL
376597	2013 PC_{29}	—	December 17, 2003	Kitt Peak	Spacewatch	HYG	3.3 km	MPC · JPL
376598	2013 PG_{29}	—	September 16, 2003	Kitt Peak	Spacewatch	·	590 m	MPC · JPL
376599	2013 PK_{31}	—	August 23, 1998	Kitt Peak	Spacewatch	·	1.8 km	MPC · JPL
376600	2013 PM_{31}	—	February 14, 2002	Kitt Peak	Spacewatch	·	2.1 km	MPC · JPL

== 376601–376700 ==
back to top

Designation			Discovery			Properties		Ref
Permanent	Provisional	Named after	Date	Site	Discoverer(s)	Category	Diam.	Ref
376601	2013 PY_{31}	—	February 14, 2004	Kitt Peak	Spacewatch	CYB	4.4 km	MPC · JPL
376602	2013 PH_{33}	—	October 6, 2005	Mount Lemmon	Mount Lemmon Survey	·	1.5 km	MPC · JPL
376603	2013 PU_{33}	—	December 25, 2005	Kitt Peak	Spacewatch	MRX	1.3 km	MPC · JPL
376604	2013 PH_{34}	—	January 7, 2006	Kitt Peak	Spacewatch	·	1.7 km	MPC · JPL
376605	2013 PZ_{34}	—	May 11, 2007	Mount Lemmon	Mount Lemmon Survey	·	2.2 km	MPC · JPL
376606	2013 PF_{35}	—	January 17, 2007	Kitt Peak	Spacewatch	·	2.5 km	MPC · JPL
376607	2013 PR_{36}	—	May 28, 2009	Kitt Peak	Spacewatch	·	720 m	MPC · JPL
376608	2013 PU_{36}	—	September 28, 2000	Kitt Peak	Spacewatch	·	890 m	MPC · JPL
376609	2013 PX_{36}	—	October 3, 2003	Kitt Peak	Spacewatch	·	2.4 km	MPC · JPL
376610	2013 PU_{37}	—	January 26, 2006	Kitt Peak	Spacewatch	KOR	2.1 km	MPC · JPL
376611	2013 PW_{37}	—	September 11, 2004	Kitt Peak	Spacewatch	AEO	1.2 km	MPC · JPL
376612	2013 PK_{40}	—	July 6, 2005	Kitt Peak	Spacewatch	·	1.4 km	MPC · JPL
376613	2013 PP_{40}	—	December 5, 2005	Mount Lemmon	Mount Lemmon Survey	·	1.6 km	MPC · JPL
376614	2013 PY_{41}	—	October 18, 2009	Mount Lemmon	Mount Lemmon Survey	·	1.8 km	MPC · JPL
376615	2013 PE_{43}	—	October 12, 2004	Goodricke-Pigott	R. A. Tucker	·	2.7 km	MPC · JPL
376616	2013 PH_{43}	—	September 20, 2003	Kitt Peak	Spacewatch	·	2.9 km	MPC · JPL
376617	2013 PO_{47}	—	April 22, 2007	Kitt Peak	Spacewatch	·	2.2 km	MPC · JPL
376618	2013 PQ_{48}	—	September 18, 2003	Kitt Peak	Spacewatch	·	510 m	MPC · JPL
376619	2013 PY_{48}	—	September 21, 2008	Kitt Peak	Spacewatch	·	3.1 km	MPC · JPL
376620	2013 PZ_{48}	—	October 30, 2008	Mount Lemmon	Mount Lemmon Survey	·	3.1 km	MPC · JPL
376621	2013 PB_{49}	—	September 12, 1994	Kitt Peak	Spacewatch	NYS	1.2 km	MPC · JPL
376622	2013 PP_{49}	—	November 29, 2005	Kitt Peak	Spacewatch	AGN	1.6 km	MPC · JPL
376623	2013 PR_{49}	—	January 26, 2006	Mount Lemmon	Mount Lemmon Survey	LIX	3.6 km	MPC · JPL
376624	2013 PB_{50}	—	September 30, 1997	Caussols	ODAS	HYG	3.6 km	MPC · JPL
376625	2013 PE_{50}	—	March 9, 2002	Kitt Peak	Spacewatch	HOF	2.6 km	MPC · JPL
376626	2013 PJ_{59}	—	November 15, 2003	Kitt Peak	Spacewatch	·	940 m	MPC · JPL
376627	2013 PK_{59}	—	January 15, 1996	Kitt Peak	Spacewatch	·	2.2 km	MPC · JPL
376628	2013 PZ_{63}	—	November 1, 2005	Kitt Peak	Spacewatch	·	1.1 km	MPC · JPL
376629	2013 PX_{65}	—	March 13, 2007	Kitt Peak	Spacewatch	·	1.7 km	MPC · JPL
376630	2013 PU_{67}	—	February 8, 2008	Kitt Peak	Spacewatch	NYS	1.3 km	MPC · JPL
376631	2013 PV_{67}	—	July 29, 2008	Mount Lemmon	Mount Lemmon Survey	·	3.9 km	MPC · JPL
376632	2013 PJ_{68}	—	September 9, 2004	Kitt Peak	Spacewatch	·	2.5 km	MPC · JPL
376633	2013 PL_{68}	—	April 13, 2008	Mount Lemmon	Mount Lemmon Survey	BRG	1.2 km	MPC · JPL
376634	2013 PY_{69}	—	September 22, 2009	Catalina	CSS	ADE	3.4 km	MPC · JPL
376635	2013 PD_{70}	—	January 6, 2000	Kitt Peak	Spacewatch	·	1.8 km	MPC · JPL
376636	2013 PE_{70}	—	February 26, 2009	Kitt Peak	Spacewatch	·	840 m	MPC · JPL
376637	2013 PF_{70}	—	September 19, 2009	Catalina	CSS	·	3.4 km	MPC · JPL
376638	2013 PH_{70}	—	April 11, 2008	Mount Lemmon	Mount Lemmon Survey	·	1.7 km	MPC · JPL
376639	2013 PS_{70}	—	March 2, 2006	Kitt Peak	Spacewatch	EOS	1.8 km	MPC · JPL
376640	2013 PE_{71}	—	September 9, 2004	Socorro	LINEAR	·	1.8 km	MPC · JPL
376641	2013 PF_{71}	—	January 19, 2005	Kitt Peak	Spacewatch	(1298)	4.3 km	MPC · JPL
376642	2013 PL_{71}	—	November 23, 2003	Kitt Peak	Spacewatch	·	730 m	MPC · JPL
376643	2013 PZ_{71}	—	January 13, 2005	Kitt Peak	Spacewatch	EOS	2.2 km	MPC · JPL
376644	2013 PV_{72}	—	December 13, 2004	Kitt Peak	Spacewatch	KOR	1.8 km	MPC · JPL
376645	2013 PZ_{72}	—	April 8, 2003	Kitt Peak	Spacewatch	·	660 m	MPC · JPL
376646	2013 QG_{2}	—	January 11, 2008	Kitt Peak	Spacewatch	·	1.3 km	MPC · JPL
376647	2013 QP_{2}	—	October 1, 2008	Catalina	CSS	EOS	2.4 km	MPC · JPL
376648	2013 QS_{2}	—	August 30, 2005	Kitt Peak	Spacewatch	·	1.5 km	MPC · JPL
376649	2013 QM_{3}	—	February 4, 2005	Kitt Peak	Spacewatch	VER	3.2 km	MPC · JPL
376650	2013 QO_{3}	—	January 28, 2000	Kitt Peak	Spacewatch	·	2.4 km	MPC · JPL
376651	2013 QE_{4}	—	August 27, 2006	Kitt Peak	Spacewatch	·	630 m	MPC · JPL
376652	2013 QO_{4}	—	September 4, 2008	Kitt Peak	Spacewatch	EOS	2.0 km	MPC · JPL
376653	2013 QV_{4}	—	September 18, 2009	Kitt Peak	Spacewatch	·	1.3 km	MPC · JPL
376654	2013 QY_{6}	—	September 18, 2003	Kitt Peak	Spacewatch	EOS	1.4 km	MPC · JPL
376655	2013 QB_{7}	—	October 1, 2005	Kitt Peak	Spacewatch	·	1.6 km	MPC · JPL
376656	2013 QD_{7}	—	November 26, 2009	Kitt Peak	Spacewatch	EOS	2.2 km	MPC · JPL
376657	2013 QM_{8}	—	September 28, 2003	Kitt Peak	Spacewatch	·	2.7 km	MPC · JPL
376658	2013 QR_{8}	—	April 1, 2008	Kitt Peak	Spacewatch	·	960 m	MPC · JPL
376659	2013 QS_{8}	—	September 20, 2008	Kitt Peak	Spacewatch	·	2.3 km	MPC · JPL
376660	2013 QA_{9}	—	February 25, 2006	Mount Lemmon	Mount Lemmon Survey	·	2.3 km	MPC · JPL
376661	2013 QF_{9}	—	July 30, 2008	Mount Lemmon	Mount Lemmon Survey	·	2.1 km	MPC · JPL
376662	2013 QQ_{9}	—	August 28, 2006	Kitt Peak	Spacewatch	·	790 m	MPC · JPL
376663	2013 QS_{9}	—	March 3, 2009	Kitt Peak	Spacewatch	·	660 m	MPC · JPL
376664	2013 QX_{9}	—	December 24, 2006	Kitt Peak	Spacewatch	·	1.6 km	MPC · JPL
376665	2013 QC_{10}	—	March 3, 2005	Catalina	CSS	NYS	760 m	MPC · JPL
376666	2013 QB_{13}	—	September 20, 2003	Kitt Peak	Spacewatch	V	630 m	MPC · JPL
376667	2013 QQ_{13}	—	July 11, 2004	Socorro	LINEAR	·	1.8 km	MPC · JPL
376668	2013 QK_{14}	—	March 12, 2008	Kitt Peak	Spacewatch	·	1.3 km	MPC · JPL
376669	2013 QB_{15}	—	December 27, 2005	Kitt Peak	Spacewatch	·	1.3 km	MPC · JPL
376670	2013 QE_{15}	—	January 28, 2007	Kitt Peak	Spacewatch	MAR	1.4 km	MPC · JPL
376671	2013 QM_{15}	—	August 23, 2007	Kitt Peak	Spacewatch	HYG	2.7 km	MPC · JPL
376672	2013 QX_{22}	—	December 25, 2005	Kitt Peak	Spacewatch	·	2.0 km	MPC · JPL
376673	2013 QA_{29}	—	October 5, 2004	Kitt Peak	Spacewatch	·	1.8 km	MPC · JPL
376674	2013 QD_{29}	—	January 16, 2005	Mauna Kea	P. A. Wiegert	·	2.3 km	MPC · JPL
376675	2013 QP_{31}	—	November 9, 1993	Kitt Peak	Spacewatch	·	2.5 km	MPC · JPL
376676	2013 QV_{33}	—	August 10, 2007	Kitt Peak	Spacewatch	·	2.8 km	MPC · JPL
376677	2013 QF_{34}	—	February 21, 2006	Mount Lemmon	Mount Lemmon Survey	·	1.5 km	MPC · JPL
376678	2013 QY_{35}	—	January 25, 1998	Kitt Peak	Spacewatch	·	550 m	MPC · JPL
376679	2013 QA_{39}	—	January 16, 2005	Kitt Peak	Spacewatch	·	2.8 km	MPC · JPL
376680	2013 QB_{39}	—	September 5, 2007	Mount Lemmon	Mount Lemmon Survey	·	5.4 km	MPC · JPL
376681	2013 QS_{39}	—	March 4, 2005	Kitt Peak	Spacewatch	·	3.8 km	MPC · JPL
376682	2013 QH_{43}	—	March 15, 2007	Kitt Peak	Spacewatch	·	1.8 km	MPC · JPL
376683	2013 QC_{44}	—	September 4, 2008	Kitt Peak	Spacewatch	·	2.1 km	MPC · JPL
376684	2013 QC_{47}	—	August 28, 2005	Kitt Peak	Spacewatch	3:2	5.5 km	MPC · JPL
376685	2013 QM_{51}	—	March 3, 2000	Kitt Peak	Spacewatch	·	2.7 km	MPC · JPL
376686	2013 QM_{56}	—	January 6, 2010	Kitt Peak	Spacewatch	·	3.2 km	MPC · JPL
376687	2013 QF_{58}	—	June 15, 2007	Kitt Peak	Spacewatch	·	3.1 km	MPC · JPL
376688	2013 QB_{60}	—	October 27, 2008	Mount Lemmon	Mount Lemmon Survey	EOS	2.4 km	MPC · JPL
376689	2013 QX_{65}	—	August 25, 2005	Palomar	NEAT	·	1.2 km	MPC · JPL
376690	2013 QG_{68}	—	October 4, 2006	Mount Lemmon	Mount Lemmon Survey	V	630 m	MPC · JPL
376691	2013 QR_{68}	—	February 25, 2011	Mount Lemmon	Mount Lemmon Survey	(16286)	1.9 km	MPC · JPL
376692	2013 QU_{75}	—	October 27, 2009	Mount Lemmon	Mount Lemmon Survey	·	2.0 km	MPC · JPL
376693	2013 QH_{79}	—	July 21, 2009	La Sagra	OAM	MAS	900 m	MPC · JPL
376694 Kassák	2013 QL_{79}	Kassák	January 30, 2011	Piszkéstető	K. Sárneczky, Kurti, S.	·	2.5 km	MPC · JPL
376695	2013 QS_{79}	—	October 2, 2006	Mount Lemmon	Mount Lemmon Survey	·	1.2 km	MPC · JPL
376696	2013 QF_{80}	—	October 1, 2005	Mount Lemmon	Mount Lemmon Survey	·	1.3 km	MPC · JPL
376697	2013 QK_{80}	—	September 21, 2003	Kitt Peak	Spacewatch	·	1.6 km	MPC · JPL
376698	2013 QY_{80}	—	December 11, 2006	Kitt Peak	Spacewatch	·	1.5 km	MPC · JPL
376699	2013 QK_{81}	—	September 22, 2008	Mount Lemmon	Mount Lemmon Survey	·	3.2 km	MPC · JPL
376700	2013 RO_{1}	—	November 18, 2009	Kitt Peak	Spacewatch	·	1.9 km	MPC · JPL

== 376701–376800 ==
back to top

Designation			Discovery			Properties		Ref
Permanent	Provisional	Named after	Date	Site	Discoverer(s)	Category	Diam.	Ref
376701	2013 RS_{1}	—	November 17, 2009	Mount Lemmon	Mount Lemmon Survey	·	1.4 km	MPC · JPL
376702	2013 RU_{2}	—	March 15, 2004	Kitt Peak	Spacewatch	NYS	1.3 km	MPC · JPL
376703	2013 RW_{2}	—	December 28, 2005	Kitt Peak	Spacewatch	·	2.1 km	MPC · JPL
376704	2013 RK_{8}	—	January 5, 2006	Mount Lemmon	Mount Lemmon Survey	·	1.8 km	MPC · JPL
376705	2013 RA_{12}	—	September 11, 2007	Mount Lemmon	Mount Lemmon Survey	CYB	3.6 km	MPC · JPL
376706	1994 UT_{7}	—	October 28, 1994	Kitt Peak	Spacewatch	·	1.8 km	MPC · JPL
376707	1995 OO	—	July 25, 1995	Kitt Peak	Spacewatch	APO +1km	1.4 km	MPC · JPL
376708	1995 SV_{32}	—	September 21, 1995	Kitt Peak	Spacewatch	·	2.4 km	MPC · JPL
376709	1995 SZ_{61}	—	September 25, 1995	Kitt Peak	Spacewatch	·	4.1 km	MPC · JPL
376710	1995 SR_{63}	—	September 25, 1995	Kitt Peak	Spacewatch	·	1.9 km	MPC · JPL
376711	1995 SB_{79}	—	September 21, 1995	Kitt Peak	Spacewatch	·	990 m	MPC · JPL
376712	1995 TQ_{9}	—	October 1, 1995	Kitt Peak	Spacewatch	·	2.0 km	MPC · JPL
376713	1995 WQ_{5}	—	November 24, 1995	Siding Spring	R. H. McNaught	·	1.7 km	MPC · JPL
376714	1996 GD_{7}	—	April 12, 1996	Kitt Peak	Spacewatch	·	1.7 km	MPC · JPL
376715	1996 RC_{19}	—	September 15, 1996	Kitt Peak	Spacewatch	·	1.4 km	MPC · JPL
376716	1996 SA_{3}	—	September 19, 1996	Kitt Peak	Spacewatch	(5)	1.1 km	MPC · JPL
376717	1996 TW_{16}	—	October 4, 1996	Kitt Peak	Spacewatch	·	2.9 km	MPC · JPL
376718	1996 VR_{19}	—	November 7, 1996	Kitt Peak	Spacewatch	·	870 m	MPC · JPL
376719	1996 VV_{31}	—	November 4, 1996	Kitt Peak	Spacewatch	VER	2.6 km	MPC · JPL
376720	1997 CO_{5}	—	February 6, 1997	Haleakala	NEAT	·	1.6 km	MPC · JPL
376721	1997 GR_{30}	—	April 8, 1997	Kitt Peak	Spacewatch	·	1.2 km	MPC · JPL
376722	1997 HF	—	April 28, 1997	Kitt Peak	Spacewatch	GEF	1.4 km	MPC · JPL
376723	1997 SB_{26}	—	September 28, 1997	Kitt Peak	Spacewatch	EOS	2.0 km	MPC · JPL
376724	1997 UH_{6}	—	October 23, 1997	Kitt Peak	Spacewatch	·	1.7 km	MPC · JPL
376725	1998 FP_{74}	—	March 24, 1998	Bergisch Gladbach	W. Bickel	·	2.3 km	MPC · JPL
376726	1998 JZ_{3}	—	May 7, 1998	Caussols	ODAS	PHO	1.4 km	MPC · JPL
376727	1998 QD_{58}	—	August 30, 1998	Kitt Peak	Spacewatch	KOR	1.2 km	MPC · JPL
376728	1998 WC_{44}	—	November 16, 1998	Kitt Peak	Spacewatch	·	1.0 km	MPC · JPL
376729	1998 YB_{8}	—	December 22, 1998	Socorro	LINEAR	AMO	540 m	MPC · JPL
376730	1999 JY_{102}	—	May 8, 1999	Catalina	CSS	·	2.1 km	MPC · JPL
376731	1999 JS_{126}	—	May 13, 1999	Socorro	LINEAR	THB	5.4 km	MPC · JPL
376732	1999 KP_{3}	—	May 19, 1999	Kitt Peak	Spacewatch	·	1.8 km	MPC · JPL
376733	1999 PQ_{2}	—	August 7, 1999	Kitt Peak	Spacewatch	·	1.7 km	MPC · JPL
376734	1999 RS_{206}	—	September 8, 1999	Socorro	LINEAR	·	2.9 km	MPC · JPL
376735	1999 TA_{22}	—	October 3, 1999	Kitt Peak	Spacewatch	AGN	1.2 km	MPC · JPL
376736	1999 TU_{58}	—	October 6, 1999	Kitt Peak	Spacewatch	·	580 m	MPC · JPL
376737	1999 TQ_{67}	—	October 8, 1999	Kitt Peak	Spacewatch	·	1.9 km	MPC · JPL
376738	1999 TG_{83}	—	October 12, 1999	Kitt Peak	Spacewatch	·	1.7 km	MPC · JPL
376739	1999 TT_{83}	—	October 12, 1999	Kitt Peak	Spacewatch	·	1.7 km	MPC · JPL
376740	1999 TY_{84}	—	October 13, 1999	Kitt Peak	Spacewatch	·	2.0 km	MPC · JPL
376741	1999 TY_{112}	—	October 4, 1999	Socorro	LINEAR	·	3.0 km	MPC · JPL
376742	1999 TS_{226}	—	October 3, 1999	Kitt Peak	Spacewatch	·	750 m	MPC · JPL
376743	1999 TV_{252}	—	October 9, 1999	Socorro	LINEAR	·	2.5 km	MPC · JPL
376744	1999 TZ_{261}	—	October 13, 1999	Socorro	LINEAR	·	760 m	MPC · JPL
376745	1999 TE_{270}	—	October 3, 1999	Socorro	LINEAR	·	2.9 km	MPC · JPL
376746	1999 TS_{270}	—	October 3, 1999	Socorro	LINEAR	·	3.4 km	MPC · JPL
376747	1999 US_{11}	—	October 29, 1999	Kitt Peak	Spacewatch	·	820 m	MPC · JPL
376748	1999 UC_{12}	—	October 30, 1999	Kitt Peak	Spacewatch	H	650 m	MPC · JPL
376749	1999 UQ_{27}	—	October 30, 1999	Kitt Peak	Spacewatch	DOR	2.5 km	MPC · JPL
376750	1999 UO_{31}	—	October 31, 1999	Kitt Peak	Spacewatch	·	2.7 km	MPC · JPL
376751	1999 UU_{40}	—	October 16, 1999	Kitt Peak	Spacewatch	CYB	3.7 km	MPC · JPL
376752	1999 VE_{14}	—	November 2, 1999	Socorro	LINEAR	PHO	1.6 km	MPC · JPL
376753	1999 VB_{40}	—	November 11, 1999	Kitt Peak	Spacewatch	(2076)	730 m	MPC · JPL
376754	1999 VV_{41}	—	November 4, 1999	Kitt Peak	Spacewatch	·	2.0 km	MPC · JPL
376755	1999 VH_{70}	—	November 4, 1999	Socorro	LINEAR	·	860 m	MPC · JPL
376756	1999 VM_{103}	—	November 9, 1999	Socorro	LINEAR	·	790 m	MPC · JPL
376757	1999 VP_{123}	—	November 5, 1999	Kitt Peak	Spacewatch	·	1.9 km	MPC · JPL
376758	1999 VO_{138}	—	November 9, 1999	Kitt Peak	Spacewatch	·	890 m	MPC · JPL
376759	1999 VT_{152}	—	November 10, 1999	Kitt Peak	Spacewatch	·	2.0 km	MPC · JPL
376760	1999 VZ_{164}	—	November 14, 1999	Socorro	LINEAR	·	2.3 km	MPC · JPL
376761	1999 VZ_{210}	—	November 13, 1999	Anderson Mesa	LONEOS	·	2.6 km	MPC · JPL
376762	1999 WW_{23}	—	November 17, 1999	Kitt Peak	Spacewatch	HOF	2.6 km	MPC · JPL
376763	1999 XB_{9}	—	December 5, 1999	Socorro	LINEAR	PHO	1.1 km	MPC · JPL
376764	1999 XS_{16}	—	December 7, 1999	Socorro	LINEAR	·	2.9 km	MPC · JPL
376765	1999 XZ_{144}	—	October 13, 1999	Socorro	LINEAR	·	2.0 km	MPC · JPL
376766	1999 XB_{150}	—	December 8, 1999	Kitt Peak	Spacewatch	·	1.8 km	MPC · JPL
376767	1999 XM_{225}	—	December 13, 1999	Kitt Peak	Spacewatch	·	840 m	MPC · JPL
376768	1999 XD_{253}	—	December 12, 1999	Kitt Peak	Spacewatch	·	1.6 km	MPC · JPL
376769	2000 AL_{253}	—	January 7, 2000	Kitt Peak	Spacewatch	·	910 m	MPC · JPL
376770	2000 CJ_{74}	—	February 7, 2000	Kitt Peak	Spacewatch	NAE	2.0 km	MPC · JPL
376771	2000 DH_{17}	—	February 29, 2000	Socorro	LINEAR	·	910 m	MPC · JPL
376772	2000 FD_{6}	—	March 25, 2000	Kitt Peak	Spacewatch	TIR	3.3 km	MPC · JPL
376773	2000 GJ_{149}	—	April 5, 2000	Socorro	LINEAR	NYS	1.2 km	MPC · JPL
376774	2000 GT_{178}	—	April 3, 2000	Kitt Peak	Spacewatch	T_{j} (2.98) · EUP	3.9 km	MPC · JPL
376775	2000 HW_{23}	—	April 26, 2000	Anderson Mesa	LONEOS	AMO	750 m	MPC · JPL
376776	2000 HG_{38}	—	April 28, 2000	Kitt Peak	Spacewatch	·	2.7 km	MPC · JPL
376777	2000 HC_{102}	—	April 27, 2000	Socorro	LINEAR	·	4.1 km	MPC · JPL
376778	2000 JY_{8}	—	May 4, 2000	Socorro	LINEAR	T_{j} (2.99) · AMO +1km	1.2 km	MPC · JPL
376779	2000 LU_{25}	—	June 11, 2000	Socorro	LINEAR	·	2.8 km	MPC · JPL
376780	2000 NG_{15}	—	July 5, 2000	Anderson Mesa	LONEOS	EUN	2.0 km	MPC · JPL
376781	2000 OY_{12}	—	July 23, 2000	Socorro	LINEAR	(5)	1.7 km	MPC · JPL
376782	2000 QC_{70}	—	August 24, 2000	Socorro	LINEAR	H	490 m	MPC · JPL
376783	2000 QK_{138}	—	August 31, 2000	Socorro	LINEAR	·	1.9 km	MPC · JPL
376784	2000 QW_{144}	—	August 31, 2000	Socorro	LINEAR	·	680 m	MPC · JPL
376785	2000 QV_{147}	—	August 31, 2000	Socorro	LINEAR	·	3.3 km	MPC · JPL
376786	2000 QO_{194}	—	August 31, 2000	Socorro	LINEAR	·	3.1 km	MPC · JPL
376787	2000 RQ_{8}	—	September 1, 2000	Socorro	LINEAR	BAR	2.2 km	MPC · JPL
376788	2000 RV_{37}	—	September 3, 2000	Socorro	LINEAR	APO	440 m	MPC · JPL
376789	2000 RP_{40}	—	September 3, 2000	Socorro	LINEAR	·	770 m	MPC · JPL
376790	2000 SK_{20}	—	September 23, 2000	Socorro	LINEAR	·	2.8 km	MPC · JPL
376791	2000 SS_{30}	—	September 24, 2000	Socorro	LINEAR	·	1.3 km	MPC · JPL
376792	2000 SU_{92}	—	September 23, 2000	Socorro	LINEAR	·	1.8 km	MPC · JPL
376793	2000 SC_{99}	—	September 23, 2000	Socorro	LINEAR	·	1.7 km	MPC · JPL
376794	2000 SN_{125}	—	September 24, 2000	Socorro	LINEAR	·	690 m	MPC · JPL
376795	2000 SN_{129}	—	September 22, 2000	Socorro	LINEAR	·	2.2 km	MPC · JPL
376796	2000 SC_{135}	—	September 23, 2000	Socorro	LINEAR	·	1.6 km	MPC · JPL
376797	2000 SZ_{156}	—	September 26, 2000	Socorro	LINEAR	·	2.0 km	MPC · JPL
376798	2000 SU_{288}	—	September 27, 2000	Socorro	LINEAR	EUN	1.6 km	MPC · JPL
376799	2000 SP_{301}	—	September 28, 2000	Socorro	LINEAR	·	2.4 km	MPC · JPL
376800	2000 SD_{314}	—	September 28, 2000	Socorro	LINEAR	·	1.7 km	MPC · JPL

== 376801–376900 ==
back to top

Designation			Discovery			Properties		Ref
Permanent	Provisional	Named after	Date	Site	Discoverer(s)	Category	Diam.	Ref
376801	2000 SG_{326}	—	September 29, 2000	Kitt Peak	Spacewatch	·	1.4 km	MPC · JPL
376802	2000 SH_{357}	—	September 28, 2000	Anderson Mesa	LONEOS	·	2.6 km	MPC · JPL
376803	2000 SO_{357}	—	September 28, 2000	Anderson Mesa	LONEOS	·	2.0 km	MPC · JPL
376804	2000 TQ_{42}	—	October 1, 2000	Socorro	LINEAR	(5)	1.8 km	MPC · JPL
376805	2000 TK_{60}	—	October 5, 2000	Socorro	LINEAR	EUN	1.5 km	MPC · JPL
376806	2000 UM_{97}	—	October 25, 2000	Socorro	LINEAR	·	2.0 km	MPC · JPL
376807	2000 VK_{5}	—	November 1, 2000	Socorro	LINEAR	·	2.0 km	MPC · JPL
376808	2000 WT_{4}	—	November 19, 2000	Socorro	LINEAR	JUN	1.3 km	MPC · JPL
376809	2000 WG_{13}	—	November 21, 2000	Socorro	LINEAR	H	590 m	MPC · JPL
376810	2000 WZ_{116}	—	November 20, 2000	Socorro	LINEAR	(1547)	2.1 km	MPC · JPL
376811	2000 WU_{124}	—	November 30, 2000	Socorro	LINEAR	·	1.9 km	MPC · JPL
376812	2000 WA_{148}	—	November 28, 2000	Kitt Peak	Spacewatch	·	2.6 km	MPC · JPL
376813	2000 YH_{39}	—	December 30, 2000	Socorro	LINEAR	·	2.9 km	MPC · JPL
376814	2000 YN_{48}	—	December 30, 2000	Socorro	LINEAR	·	2.2 km	MPC · JPL
376815	2000 YW_{51}	—	December 30, 2000	Socorro	LINEAR	·	1.7 km	MPC · JPL
376816	2000 YP_{64}	—	December 30, 2000	Socorro	LINEAR	H	650 m	MPC · JPL
376817	2001 AT_{43}	—	January 4, 2001	Socorro	LINEAR	·	1.4 km	MPC · JPL
376818	2001 AG_{54}	—	January 4, 2001	Socorro	LINEAR	·	800 m	MPC · JPL
376819	2001 BE_{3}	—	January 17, 2001	Socorro	LINEAR	·	900 m	MPC · JPL
376820	2001 BZ_{13}	—	January 19, 2001	Kitt Peak	Spacewatch	·	780 m	MPC · JPL
376821	2001 CL_{18}	—	February 2, 2001	Socorro	LINEAR	·	2.1 km	MPC · JPL
376822	2001 DD_{56}	—	February 16, 2001	Kitt Peak	Spacewatch	·	870 m	MPC · JPL
376823	2001 EU_{23}	—	March 15, 2001	Haleakala	NEAT	·	960 m	MPC · JPL
376824	2001 FN_{11}	—	March 19, 2001	Anderson Mesa	LONEOS	·	3.3 km	MPC · JPL
376825	2001 FP_{59}	—	March 19, 2001	Socorro	LINEAR	·	1.1 km	MPC · JPL
376826	2001 FF_{64}	—	March 19, 2001	Socorro	LINEAR	·	1.0 km	MPC · JPL
376827	2001 FR_{113}	—	March 19, 2001	Anderson Mesa	LONEOS	·	1.1 km	MPC · JPL
376828	2001 FC_{186}	—	March 16, 2001	Socorro	LINEAR	·	1.4 km	MPC · JPL
376829	2001 FY_{208}	—	March 21, 2001	Kitt Peak	SKADS	·	1.4 km	MPC · JPL
376830	2001 MJ_{11}	—	June 27, 2001	Palomar	NEAT	·	810 m	MPC · JPL
376831	2001 OL_{1}	—	July 18, 2001	Palomar	NEAT	·	4.0 km	MPC · JPL
376832	2001 OW_{3}	—	July 18, 2001	Palomar	NEAT	TIR	4.0 km	MPC · JPL
376833	2001 OM_{25}	—	July 18, 2001	Haleakala	NEAT	·	740 m	MPC · JPL
376834	2001 OH_{92}	—	July 22, 2001	Palomar	NEAT	·	4.8 km	MPC · JPL
376835	2001 QD_{9}	—	August 16, 2001	Socorro	LINEAR	·	4.4 km	MPC · JPL
376836	2001 QD_{61}	—	August 19, 2001	Socorro	LINEAR	·	1.9 km	MPC · JPL
376837	2001 QA_{114}	—	August 24, 2001	Palomar	NEAT	·	2.0 km	MPC · JPL
376838	2001 QP_{146}	—	August 26, 2001	Kitt Peak	Spacewatch	·	3.2 km	MPC · JPL
376839	2001 QZ_{148}	—	August 21, 2001	Haleakala	NEAT	T_{j} (2.97)	4.9 km	MPC · JPL
376840	2001 QG_{161}	—	August 23, 2001	Anderson Mesa	LONEOS	·	1.4 km	MPC · JPL
376841	2001 QE_{162}	—	August 23, 2001	Anderson Mesa	LONEOS	·	4.1 km	MPC · JPL
376842	2001 QM_{259}	—	August 25, 2001	Socorro	LINEAR	·	1.2 km	MPC · JPL
376843	2001 QW_{267}	—	August 20, 2001	Socorro	LINEAR	·	4.0 km	MPC · JPL
376844	2001 QV_{316}	—	August 20, 2001	Cerro Tololo	M. W. Buie	THM	1.7 km	MPC · JPL
376845	2001 QO_{318}	—	August 20, 2001	Cerro Tololo	M. W. Buie	·	1.3 km	MPC · JPL
376846	2001 RU	—	September 8, 2001	Socorro	LINEAR	·	4.3 km	MPC · JPL
376847	2001 RK_{15}	—	September 10, 2001	Socorro	LINEAR	·	4.0 km	MPC · JPL
376848	2001 RY_{47}	—	September 15, 2001	Palomar	NEAT	ATE	430 m	MPC · JPL
376849	2001 RM_{66}	—	September 10, 2001	Socorro	LINEAR	·	3.6 km	MPC · JPL
376850	2001 RU_{129}	—	September 12, 2001	Socorro	LINEAR	·	3.9 km	MPC · JPL
376851	2001 RG_{152}	—	September 11, 2001	Anderson Mesa	LONEOS	PHO	1.3 km	MPC · JPL
376852	2001 SX_{85}	—	September 20, 2001	Socorro	LINEAR	·	3.5 km	MPC · JPL
376853	2001 SQ_{94}	—	September 20, 2001	Socorro	LINEAR	·	4.7 km	MPC · JPL
376854	2001 SK_{96}	—	September 20, 2001	Socorro	LINEAR	·	2.7 km	MPC · JPL
376855	2001 SY_{272}	—	September 21, 2001	Palomar	NEAT	EUP	3.7 km	MPC · JPL
376856	2001 SN_{290}	—	September 30, 2001	Palomar	NEAT	·	4.3 km	MPC · JPL
376857	2001 SW_{299}	—	September 20, 2001	Socorro	LINEAR	DOR	2.2 km	MPC · JPL
376858	2001 SJ_{301}	—	September 20, 2001	Socorro	LINEAR	·	1.4 km	MPC · JPL
376859	2001 SS_{316}	—	September 25, 2001	Socorro	LINEAR	·	1.3 km	MPC · JPL
376860	2001 SC_{323}	—	September 25, 2001	Socorro	LINEAR	·	3.3 km	MPC · JPL
376861	2001 TH_{7}	—	October 11, 2001	Palomar	NEAT	·	1.1 km	MPC · JPL
376862	2001 TP_{25}	—	October 14, 2001	Socorro	LINEAR	·	920 m	MPC · JPL
376863	2001 TU_{90}	—	October 14, 2001	Socorro	LINEAR	·	1.9 km	MPC · JPL
376864	2001 TP_{103}	—	October 14, 2001	Socorro	LINEAR	AMO	320 m	MPC · JPL
376865	2001 TJ_{153}	—	October 11, 2001	Palomar	NEAT	·	3.9 km	MPC · JPL
376866	2001 TU_{190}	—	October 14, 2001	Socorro	LINEAR	·	1.6 km	MPC · JPL
376867	2001 TN_{222}	—	October 14, 2001	Socorro	LINEAR	L5 · (291316) · 010	13 km	MPC · JPL
376868	2001 TU_{254}	—	October 14, 2001	Apache Point	SDSS	HYG	2.9 km	MPC · JPL
376869	2001 TQ_{260}	—	October 14, 2001	Apache Point	SDSS	L5	9.9 km	MPC · JPL
376870	2001 UR_{60}	—	October 17, 2001	Socorro	LINEAR	·	1.4 km	MPC · JPL
376871	2001 UT_{108}	—	October 20, 2001	Socorro	LINEAR	·	1.7 km	MPC · JPL
376872	2001 UM_{160}	—	October 23, 2001	Socorro	LINEAR	·	1.1 km	MPC · JPL
376873	2001 UW_{230}	—	October 16, 2001	Palomar	NEAT	L5	9.6 km	MPC · JPL
376874	2001 VE	—	November 6, 2001	Socorro	LINEAR	T_{j} (2.85)	4.1 km	MPC · JPL
376875	2001 VD_{37}	—	November 9, 2001	Socorro	LINEAR	·	2.0 km	MPC · JPL
376876	2001 VC_{56}	—	November 10, 2001	Socorro	LINEAR	·	900 m	MPC · JPL
376877	2001 VV_{85}	—	November 12, 2001	Socorro	LINEAR	·	1.2 km	MPC · JPL
376878	2001 VY_{114}	—	November 12, 2001	Socorro	LINEAR	·	1.4 km	MPC · JPL
376879	2001 WW_{1}	—	November 18, 2001	Socorro	LINEAR	AMO	120 m	MPC · JPL
376880	2001 WE_{12}	—	November 17, 2001	Socorro	LINEAR	·	850 m	MPC · JPL
376881	2001 WL_{46}	—	November 19, 2001	Socorro	LINEAR	·	990 m	MPC · JPL
376882	2001 WO_{70}	—	November 20, 2001	Socorro	LINEAR	·	2.5 km	MPC · JPL
376883	2001 XE_{1}	—	December 7, 2001	Socorro	LINEAR	AMO	450 m	MPC · JPL
376884	2001 XS_{24}	—	December 10, 2001	Socorro	LINEAR	·	2.0 km	MPC · JPL
376885	2001 XM_{39}	—	December 9, 2001	Socorro	LINEAR	·	2.1 km	MPC · JPL
376886	2001 XR_{46}	—	December 9, 2001	Socorro	LINEAR	·	3.5 km	MPC · JPL
376887	2001 XY_{47}	—	December 9, 2001	Socorro	LINEAR	·	2.6 km	MPC · JPL
376888	2001 XP_{73}	—	December 11, 2001	Socorro	LINEAR	·	3.5 km	MPC · JPL
376889	2001 XU_{91}	—	December 10, 2001	Socorro	LINEAR	·	2.0 km	MPC · JPL
376890	2001 XA_{95}	—	December 10, 2001	Socorro	LINEAR	·	2.1 km	MPC · JPL
376891	2001 XF_{104}	—	December 15, 2001	Socorro	LINEAR	·	2.0 km	MPC · JPL
376892	2001 XG_{107}	—	December 10, 2001	Socorro	LINEAR	EUN	1.3 km	MPC · JPL
376893	2001 XK_{116}	—	December 13, 2001	Socorro	LINEAR	·	1.2 km	MPC · JPL
376894	2001 XX_{137}	—	December 14, 2001	Socorro	LINEAR	·	3.2 km	MPC · JPL
376895	2001 XF_{142}	—	December 14, 2001	Socorro	LINEAR	·	1.6 km	MPC · JPL
376896	2001 XN_{145}	—	December 14, 2001	Socorro	LINEAR	·	1.8 km	MPC · JPL
376897	2001 XJ_{155}	—	December 14, 2001	Socorro	LINEAR	·	1.9 km	MPC · JPL
376898	2001 XD_{208}	—	December 11, 2001	Socorro	LINEAR	·	1.6 km	MPC · JPL
376899	2001 XB_{237}	—	December 15, 2001	Socorro	LINEAR	·	1.1 km	MPC · JPL
376900	2001 XQ_{237}	—	December 15, 2001	Socorro	LINEAR	·	980 m	MPC · JPL

== 376901–377000 ==
back to top

Designation			Discovery			Properties		Ref
Permanent	Provisional	Named after	Date	Site	Discoverer(s)	Category	Diam.	Ref
376901	2001 XU_{248}	—	December 14, 2001	Kitt Peak	Spacewatch	(5)	1.0 km	MPC · JPL
376902	2001 XZ_{259}	—	December 9, 2001	Socorro	LINEAR	·	1.8 km	MPC · JPL
376903	2001 YB_{6}	—	December 23, 2001	Kingsnake	J. V. McClusky	·	4.0 km	MPC · JPL
376904	2001 YJ_{15}	—	December 17, 2001	Socorro	LINEAR	(5)	1.5 km	MPC · JPL
376905	2001 YA_{16}	—	December 17, 2001	Socorro	LINEAR	EUN	1.5 km	MPC · JPL
376906	2001 YE_{53}	—	December 18, 2001	Socorro	LINEAR	KRM	3.6 km	MPC · JPL
376907	2001 YM_{85}	—	December 18, 2001	Socorro	LINEAR	·	3.1 km	MPC · JPL
376908	2001 YK_{96}	—	December 18, 2001	Palomar	NEAT	BRG	2.1 km	MPC · JPL
376909	2001 YV_{96}	—	December 17, 2001	Socorro	LINEAR	·	1.8 km	MPC · JPL
376910	2001 YU_{123}	—	December 17, 2001	Socorro	LINEAR	·	1.2 km	MPC · JPL
376911	2001 YU_{131}	—	December 19, 2001	Socorro	LINEAR	EUN	1.7 km	MPC · JPL
376912	2001 YX_{149}	—	December 19, 2001	Palomar	NEAT	·	1.4 km	MPC · JPL
376913	2002 AF_{31}	—	January 9, 2002	Socorro	LINEAR	(5)	1.3 km	MPC · JPL
376914	2002 AO_{37}	—	January 9, 2002	Socorro	LINEAR	(5)	1.5 km	MPC · JPL
376915	2002 AP_{40}	—	January 9, 2002	Socorro	LINEAR	RAF	920 m	MPC · JPL
376916	2002 AV_{46}	—	January 9, 2002	Socorro	LINEAR	(5)	1.6 km	MPC · JPL
376917	2002 AM_{49}	—	January 9, 2002	Socorro	LINEAR	·	1.2 km	MPC · JPL
376918	2002 AM_{97}	—	January 8, 2002	Socorro	LINEAR	·	3.2 km	MPC · JPL
376919	2002 AT_{103}	—	January 9, 2002	Socorro	LINEAR	·	1.7 km	MPC · JPL
376920	2002 AR_{127}	—	January 13, 2002	Socorro	LINEAR	·	1.3 km	MPC · JPL
376921	2002 AV_{172}	—	January 14, 2002	Socorro	LINEAR	(5)	1.6 km	MPC · JPL
376922	2002 AR_{203}	—	January 12, 2002	Kitt Peak	Spacewatch	·	1.2 km	MPC · JPL
376923	2002 BY_{27}	—	January 20, 2002	Anderson Mesa	LONEOS	·	1.2 km	MPC · JPL
376924	2002 CM_{29}	—	February 6, 2002	Socorro	LINEAR	·	1.1 km	MPC · JPL
376925	2002 CX_{32}	—	February 6, 2002	Socorro	LINEAR	·	1.3 km	MPC · JPL
376926	2002 CH_{44}	—	February 10, 2002	Socorro	LINEAR	H	430 m	MPC · JPL
376927	2002 CM_{67}	—	January 13, 2002	Socorro	LINEAR	·	1.9 km	MPC · JPL
376928	2002 CG_{71}	—	February 7, 2002	Socorro	LINEAR	·	1.2 km	MPC · JPL
376929	2002 CN_{86}	—	February 7, 2002	Socorro	LINEAR	MAR	1.3 km	MPC · JPL
376930	2002 CG_{109}	—	February 7, 2002	Socorro	LINEAR	·	1.9 km	MPC · JPL
376931	2002 CS_{118}	—	February 13, 2002	Socorro	LINEAR	·	4.5 km	MPC · JPL
376932	2002 CD_{141}	—	February 8, 2002	Socorro	LINEAR	(5)	1.3 km	MPC · JPL
376933	2002 CW_{153}	—	February 9, 2002	Kitt Peak	Spacewatch	·	1.6 km	MPC · JPL
376934	2002 CM_{166}	—	February 8, 2002	Socorro	LINEAR	·	1.4 km	MPC · JPL
376935	2002 CX_{171}	—	February 8, 2002	Socorro	LINEAR	·	2.5 km	MPC · JPL
376936	2002 CO_{189}	—	February 10, 2002	Socorro	LINEAR	(5)	1.2 km	MPC · JPL
376937	2002 CC_{194}	—	February 10, 2002	Socorro	LINEAR	·	1.5 km	MPC · JPL
376938	2002 CS_{229}	—	February 10, 2002	Kitt Peak	Spacewatch	·	1.9 km	MPC · JPL
376939	2002 CA_{253}	—	February 5, 2002	Anderson Mesa	LONEOS	(5)	1.9 km	MPC · JPL
376940	2002 CT_{255}	—	February 6, 2002	Palomar	NEAT	BAR	1.6 km	MPC · JPL
376941	2002 CR_{265}	—	February 7, 2002	Kitt Peak	Spacewatch	·	2.3 km	MPC · JPL
376942	2002 CF_{290}	—	February 10, 2002	Socorro	LINEAR	·	1.5 km	MPC · JPL
376943	2002 CD_{314}	—	February 3, 2002	Palomar	NEAT	·	1.1 km	MPC · JPL
376944	2002 DP_{3}	—	February 21, 2002	Palomar	NEAT	·	1.8 km	MPC · JPL
376945	2002 DV_{14}	—	February 16, 2002	Palomar	NEAT	ADE	2.4 km	MPC · JPL
376946	2002 EC_{4}	—	March 10, 2002	Cima Ekar	ADAS	·	1.3 km	MPC · JPL
376947	2002 ET_{33}	—	March 11, 2002	Palomar	NEAT	·	1.8 km	MPC · JPL
376948	2002 EZ_{48}	—	March 12, 2002	Palomar	NEAT	·	780 m	MPC · JPL
376949	2002 EG_{64}	—	March 13, 2002	Socorro	LINEAR	·	730 m	MPC · JPL
376950	2002 ER_{97}	—	March 12, 2002	Socorro	LINEAR	·	1.8 km	MPC · JPL
376951	2002 EG_{119}	—	March 10, 2002	Kitt Peak	Spacewatch	·	1.2 km	MPC · JPL
376952	2002 EM_{162}	—	March 13, 2002	Kitt Peak	Spacewatch	·	2.8 km	MPC · JPL
376953	2002 FE_{28}	—	March 20, 2002	Kitt Peak	Spacewatch	·	2.7 km	MPC · JPL
376954	2002 FP_{30}	—	March 20, 2002	Socorro	LINEAR	·	2.1 km	MPC · JPL
376955	2002 GR_{3}	—	April 8, 2002	Palomar	NEAT	·	1.6 km	MPC · JPL
376956	2002 GG_{4}	—	April 9, 2002	Socorro	LINEAR	H	530 m	MPC · JPL
376957	2002 GN_{28}	—	April 6, 2002	Cerro Tololo	M. W. Buie	·	1.3 km	MPC · JPL
376958	2002 GM_{40}	—	April 4, 2002	Palomar	NEAT	·	2.2 km	MPC · JPL
376959	2002 GJ_{69}	—	April 8, 2002	Palomar	NEAT	·	1.7 km	MPC · JPL
376960	2002 GQ_{84}	—	April 10, 2002	Socorro	LINEAR	·	3.0 km	MPC · JPL
376961	2002 GB_{91}	—	April 8, 2002	Palomar	NEAT	·	2.6 km	MPC · JPL
376962	2002 GB_{132}	—	March 16, 2002	Kitt Peak	Spacewatch	·	2.2 km	MPC · JPL
376963	2002 GC_{139}	—	April 13, 2002	Palomar	NEAT	·	2.6 km	MPC · JPL
376964	2002 HD	—	April 16, 2002	Socorro	LINEAR	·	1.4 km	MPC · JPL
376965	2002 JY_{54}	—	May 9, 2002	Socorro	LINEAR	·	880 m	MPC · JPL
376966	2002 JW_{57}	—	April 22, 2002	Kitt Peak	Spacewatch	slow	2.5 km	MPC · JPL
376967	2002 JV_{79}	—	May 11, 2002	Socorro	LINEAR	·	2.1 km	MPC · JPL
376968	2002 JJ_{101}	—	May 15, 2002	Socorro	LINEAR	·	1.1 km	MPC · JPL
376969	2002 JR_{102}	—	May 9, 2002	Socorro	LINEAR	·	2.6 km	MPC · JPL
376970	2002 JR_{149}	—	May 10, 2002	Palomar	NEAT	·	2.1 km	MPC · JPL
376971	2002 KA_{1}	—	May 17, 2002	Socorro	LINEAR	·	1.3 km	MPC · JPL
376972	2002 KO_{13}	—	May 18, 2002	Palomar	NEAT	·	2.7 km	MPC · JPL
376973	2002 LK_{34}	—	June 6, 2002	Socorro	LINEAR	·	1.3 km	MPC · JPL
376974	2002 NF_{5}	—	July 10, 2002	Campo Imperatore	CINEOS	·	810 m	MPC · JPL
376975	2002 NY_{5}	—	June 5, 2002	Kitt Peak	Spacewatch	·	2.1 km	MPC · JPL
376976	2002 NQ_{68}	—	July 4, 2002	Palomar	NEAT	·	800 m	MPC · JPL
376977	2002 NJ_{69}	—	July 3, 2002	Palomar	Palomar	·	1.2 km	MPC · JPL
376978	2002 NV_{74}	—	July 4, 2002	Palomar	NEAT	·	800 m	MPC · JPL
376979	2002 OS_{2}	—	July 17, 2002	Socorro	LINEAR	·	4.6 km	MPC · JPL
376980	2002 OO_{6}	—	July 20, 2002	Palomar	NEAT	·	1.1 km	MPC · JPL
376981	2002 OV_{26}	—	July 22, 2002	Palomar	NEAT	H	550 m	MPC · JPL
376982	2002 OZ_{26}	—	July 19, 2002	Palomar	NEAT	·	2.5 km	MPC · JPL
376983	2002 OD_{31}	—	July 18, 2002	Palomar	NEAT	·	1.8 km	MPC · JPL
376984	2002 OR_{31}	—	July 17, 2002	Palomar	NEAT	·	950 m	MPC · JPL
376985	2002 OE_{33}	—	July 18, 2002	Palomar	NEAT	·	1.7 km	MPC · JPL
376986	2002 PP_{2}	—	August 3, 2002	Palomar	NEAT	·	2.5 km	MPC · JPL
376987	2002 PX_{16}	—	August 6, 2002	Palomar	NEAT	·	990 m	MPC · JPL
376988	2002 PQ_{27}	—	August 6, 2002	Palomar	NEAT	·	760 m	MPC · JPL
376989	2002 PM_{33}	—	August 6, 2002	Campo Imperatore	CINEOS	·	2.8 km	MPC · JPL
376990	2002 PN_{83}	—	August 10, 2002	Socorro	LINEAR	PHO	1.2 km	MPC · JPL
376991	2002 PO_{118}	—	August 13, 2002	Anderson Mesa	LONEOS	·	930 m	MPC · JPL
376992	2002 PW_{118}	—	August 13, 2002	Anderson Mesa	LONEOS	·	2.6 km	MPC · JPL
376993	2002 PX_{129}	—	August 15, 2002	Socorro	LINEAR	·	1.6 km	MPC · JPL
376994	2002 PF_{130}	—	August 14, 2002	Socorro	LINEAR	·	920 m	MPC · JPL
376995	2002 PP_{138}	—	August 11, 2002	Socorro	LINEAR	·	940 m	MPC · JPL
376996	2002 PC_{178}	—	August 15, 2002	Palomar	NEAT	·	2.1 km	MPC · JPL
376997	2002 PM_{178}	—	August 15, 2002	Palomar	NEAT	·	1.8 km	MPC · JPL
376998	2002 PZ_{182}	—	August 8, 2002	Palomar	NEAT	KOR	1.4 km	MPC · JPL
376999	2002 PJ_{198}	—	July 30, 1995	Kitt Peak	Spacewatch	·	750 m	MPC · JPL
377000	2002 QY_{33}	—	August 29, 2002	Palomar	NEAT	·	2.0 km	MPC · JPL

back to top

== See also ==
- Meanings of minor-planet names: 376001–377000
