= Meanings of minor-planet names: 376001–377000 =

As minor planet discoveries are confirmed, they are given a permanent number by the IAU's Minor Planet Center (MPC), and the discoverers can then submit names for them, following the IAU's naming conventions. The list below concerns those minor planets in the specified number-range that have received names, and explains the meanings of those names.

Official naming citations of newly named small Solar System bodies are approved and published in a bulletin by IAU's Working Group for Small Bodies Nomenclature (WGSBN). Before May 2021, citations were published in MPC's Minor Planet Circulars for many decades. Recent citations can also be found on the JPL Small-Body Database (SBDB). Until his death in 2016, German astronomer Lutz D. Schmadel compiled these citations into the Dictionary of Minor Planet Names (DMP) and regularly updated the collection.

Based on Paul Herget's The Names of the Minor Planets, Schmadel also researched the unclear origin of numerous asteroids, most of which had been named prior to World War II. This article incorporates text from this source, which is in the public domain: SBDB New namings may only be added to this list below after official publication as the preannouncement of names is condemned. The WGSBN publishes a comprehensive guideline for the naming rules of non-cometary small Solar System bodies.

== 376001–376100 ==
Named minor planet	Provisional	This minor planet was named for...	Ref · Catalog
376029 Blahová	2010 CX_{11}	Blahová, a small Slovak village	JPL · 376029
376084 Annettepeter	2010 VW_{20}	Annette Peter (born 1971), wife of German discoverer Erwin Schwab	JPL · 376084

== 376101–376200 ==
back to top

Named minor planet	Provisional	This minor planet was named for...	Ref · Catalog
There are no named minor planets in this number range

== 376201–376300 ==
back to top

Named minor planet	Provisional	This minor planet was named for...	Ref · Catalog
376299 Friesen	2011 FC_{138}	Rachel Friesen, Canadian astronomer.	IAU · 376299

== 376301–376400 ==
back to top

Named minor planet	Provisional	This minor planet was named for...	Ref · Catalog
376311 Naidubezawada	2011 GE_{21}	Naidu Bezawada, has worked on telescope instrumentation and detector systems at the Indian Institute of Astrophysics, the UK Astronomy Technology Centre, and the European Southern Observatory (ESO). His expertise in detector technology and leadership are critical for the instrumentation of ESO's Extremely Large Telescope.	IAU · 376311

== 376401–376500 ==
back to top

Named minor planet	Provisional	This minor planet was named for...	Ref · Catalog
There are no named minor planets in this number range

== 376501–376600 ==
back to top

Named minor planet	Provisional	This minor planet was named for...	Ref · Catalog
376574 Michalkusiak	2013 PA_{16}	Michal Kusiak (born 1986), an extraordinary popularizer of astronomy in Poland. The asteroid's name was suggested by astronomer Rafał Reszelewski.	JPL · 376574

== 376601–376700 ==
back to top

Named minor planet	Provisional	This minor planet was named for...	Ref · Catalog
376694 Kassák	2013 QL_{79}	Lajos Kassák (1887–1967), a Hungarian poet, novelist, painter, essayist, editor and occasional translator.	JPL · 376694

== 376701–376800 ==
back to top

Named minor planet	Provisional	This minor planet was named for...	Ref · Catalog
There are no named minor planets in this number range

== 376801–376900 ==
back to top

Named minor planet	Provisional	This minor planet was named for...	Ref · Catalog
There are no named minor planets in this number range

== 376901–377000 ==
back to top

Named minor planet	Provisional	This minor planet was named for...	Ref · Catalog
There are no named minor planets in this number range

back to top

Preceded by 375,001–376,000	Meanings of minor-planet names List of minor planets: 376,001–377,000	Succeeded by 377,001–378,000
