= List of minor planets: 340001–341000 =

The following is a partial list of minor planets, running from minor-planet number 340001 through 341000, inclusive. The primary data for this and other partial lists is based on JPL's "Small-Body Orbital Elements" and data available from the Minor Planet Center. Critical list information is also provided by the MPC, unless otherwise specified from Lowell Observatory. A detailed description of the table's columns and additional sources are given on the main page including a complete list of every page in this series, and a statistical break-up on the dynamical classification of minor planets.

Also see the summary list of all named bodies in numerical and alphabetical order, and the corresponding naming citations for the number range of this particular list. New namings may only be added to this list after official publication, as the preannouncement of names is condemned by the Working Group for Small Bodies Nomenclature of the International Astronomical Union.

Near-Earth obj.	MBA (inner)	MBA (outer)	Centaur
Mars-crosser	MBA (middle)	Jupiter trojan	Trans-Neptunian obj.
Unclassified

== 340001–340100 ==
Designation			Discovery			Properties		Ref
Permanent	Provisional	Named after	Date	Site	Discoverer(s)	Category	Diam.	Ref
340001	2005 UH_{299}	—	October 26, 2005	Kitt Peak	Spacewatch	NYS	1.2 km	MPC · JPL
340002	2005 UL_{300}	—	October 26, 2005	Kitt Peak	Spacewatch	V	760 m	MPC · JPL
340003	2005 UJ_{305}	—	October 27, 2005	Kitt Peak	Spacewatch	·	990 m	MPC · JPL
340004	2005 UM_{308}	—	October 27, 2005	Mount Lemmon	Mount Lemmon Survey	·	1.2 km	MPC · JPL
340005	2005 UJ_{311}	—	October 29, 2005	Catalina	CSS	·	1.0 km	MPC · JPL
340006	2005 UL_{311}	—	October 29, 2005	Mount Lemmon	Mount Lemmon Survey	·	780 m	MPC · JPL
340007	2005 UH_{312}	—	October 29, 2005	Mount Lemmon	Mount Lemmon Survey	·	900 m	MPC · JPL
340008	2005 UX_{312}	—	October 29, 2005	Catalina	CSS	·	1.4 km	MPC · JPL
340009	2005 UL_{314}	—	October 28, 2005	Catalina	CSS	·	880 m	MPC · JPL
340010	2005 UN_{318}	—	October 27, 2005	Kitt Peak	Spacewatch	3:2 · SHU	7.0 km	MPC · JPL
340011	2005 UW_{332}	—	October 29, 2005	Mount Lemmon	Mount Lemmon Survey	(1338) (FLO)	760 m	MPC · JPL
340012	2005 UK_{336}	—	October 30, 2005	Kitt Peak	Spacewatch	·	860 m	MPC · JPL
340013	2005 UR_{341}	—	October 31, 2005	Kitt Peak	Spacewatch	·	1.4 km	MPC · JPL
340014	2005 UF_{344}	—	October 29, 2005	Kitt Peak	Spacewatch	·	1.1 km	MPC · JPL
340015	2005 UN_{344}	—	October 29, 2005	Kitt Peak	Spacewatch	·	1.1 km	MPC · JPL
340016	2005 UB_{351}	—	October 29, 2005	Catalina	CSS	·	1.5 km	MPC · JPL
340017	2005 US_{353}	—	October 29, 2005	Catalina	CSS	·	2.3 km	MPC · JPL
340018	2005 UO_{355}	—	October 29, 2005	Catalina	CSS	PHO	1.8 km	MPC · JPL
340019	2005 UF_{369}	—	October 27, 2005	Kitt Peak	Spacewatch	·	1.2 km	MPC · JPL
340020	2005 UE_{370}	—	October 27, 2005	Kitt Peak	Spacewatch	MAS	720 m	MPC · JPL
340021	2005 UF_{371}	—	October 27, 2005	Mount Lemmon	Mount Lemmon Survey	·	1.2 km	MPC · JPL
340022	2005 UE_{374}	—	October 27, 2005	Kitt Peak	Spacewatch	·	1.5 km	MPC · JPL
340023	2005 UP_{376}	—	October 27, 2005	Kitt Peak	Spacewatch	·	1.1 km	MPC · JPL
340024	2005 UO_{387}	—	October 30, 2005	Mount Lemmon	Mount Lemmon Survey	·	1.4 km	MPC · JPL
340025	2005 UP_{393}	—	October 28, 2005	Catalina	CSS	·	1.4 km	MPC · JPL
340026	2005 UT_{403}	—	October 29, 2005	Mount Lemmon	Mount Lemmon Survey	·	980 m	MPC · JPL
340027	2005 UN_{412}	—	October 31, 2005	Mount Lemmon	Mount Lemmon Survey	·	1.2 km	MPC · JPL
340028	2005 UV_{412}	—	October 31, 2005	Mount Lemmon	Mount Lemmon Survey	3:2	4.5 km	MPC · JPL
340029	2005 UU_{427}	—	October 28, 2005	Kitt Peak	Spacewatch	·	1.3 km	MPC · JPL
340030	2005 UG_{434}	—	October 29, 2005	Mount Lemmon	Mount Lemmon Survey	·	880 m	MPC · JPL
340031	2005 UW_{437}	—	October 26, 2005	Kitt Peak	Spacewatch	NYS	1.3 km	MPC · JPL
340032	2005 UZ_{440}	—	October 29, 2005	Catalina	CSS	V	700 m	MPC · JPL
340033	2005 UG_{444}	—	October 30, 2005	Kitt Peak	Spacewatch	·	1.1 km	MPC · JPL
340034	2005 UQ_{454}	—	October 27, 2005	Anderson Mesa	LONEOS	·	1.2 km	MPC · JPL
340035	2005 UN_{459}	—	October 27, 2005	Mount Lemmon	Mount Lemmon Survey	V	710 m	MPC · JPL
340036	2005 UL_{461}	—	October 28, 2005	Mount Lemmon	Mount Lemmon Survey	·	1.6 km	MPC · JPL
340037	2005 UX_{476}	—	October 25, 2005	Kitt Peak	Spacewatch	3:2	5.7 km	MPC · JPL
340038	2005 UU_{478}	—	October 27, 2005	Kitt Peak	Spacewatch	NYS	890 m	MPC · JPL
340039	2005 UH_{484}	—	October 22, 2005	Palomar	NEAT	·	920 m	MPC · JPL
340040	2005 UN_{485}	—	October 22, 2005	Catalina	CSS	·	1.2 km	MPC · JPL
340041	2005 UE_{490}	—	October 23, 2005	Catalina	CSS	V	690 m	MPC · JPL
340042	2005 UP_{490}	—	September 25, 2005	Kitt Peak	Spacewatch	NYS	1 km	MPC · JPL
340043	2005 UH_{508}	—	October 25, 2005	Kitt Peak	Spacewatch	V	800 m	MPC · JPL
340044	2005 UO_{508}	—	October 27, 2005	Mount Lemmon	Mount Lemmon Survey	NYS	1.3 km	MPC · JPL
340045	2005 UP_{509}	—	October 28, 2005	Kitt Peak	Spacewatch	·	690 m	MPC · JPL
340046	2005 UY_{513}	—	October 27, 2005	Mount Lemmon	Mount Lemmon Survey	V	900 m	MPC · JPL
340047	2005 UP_{530}	—	October 25, 2005	Catalina	CSS	MAS	770 m	MPC · JPL
340048	2005 VT_{5}	—	November 10, 2005	Catalina	CSS	AMO	550 m	MPC · JPL
340049	2005 VK_{15}	—	November 1, 2005	Socorro	LINEAR	NYS	1.1 km	MPC · JPL
340050	2005 VL_{16}	—	November 3, 2005	Socorro	LINEAR	·	1.1 km	MPC · JPL
340051	2005 VK_{20}	—	November 1, 2005	Kitt Peak	Spacewatch	NYS	1.1 km	MPC · JPL
340052	2005 VC_{23}	—	October 25, 2005	Kitt Peak	Spacewatch	·	1.5 km	MPC · JPL
340053	2005 VB_{24}	—	November 1, 2005	Kitt Peak	Spacewatch	V	700 m	MPC · JPL
340054	2005 VT_{24}	—	November 1, 2005	Kitt Peak	Spacewatch	·	840 m	MPC · JPL
340055	2005 VX_{29}	—	November 4, 2005	Kitt Peak	Spacewatch	NYS	1.2 km	MPC · JPL
340056	2005 VG_{30}	—	November 4, 2005	Kitt Peak	Spacewatch	·	1.1 km	MPC · JPL
340057	2005 VP_{31}	—	November 4, 2005	Kitt Peak	Spacewatch	NYS	1.0 km	MPC · JPL
340058	2005 VY_{32}	—	November 4, 2005	Kitt Peak	Spacewatch	·	1.2 km	MPC · JPL
340059	2005 VX_{33}	—	November 2, 2005	Mount Lemmon	Mount Lemmon Survey	V	810 m	MPC · JPL
340060	2005 VA_{40}	—	November 4, 2005	Catalina	CSS	·	1.0 km	MPC · JPL
340061	2005 VE_{40}	—	November 4, 2005	Mount Lemmon	Mount Lemmon Survey	·	680 m	MPC · JPL
340062	2005 VX_{41}	—	November 3, 2005	Socorro	LINEAR	·	1.1 km	MPC · JPL
340063	2005 VK_{47}	—	November 5, 2005	Kitt Peak	Spacewatch	NYS	1.1 km	MPC · JPL
340064	2005 VH_{51}	—	November 3, 2005	Catalina	CSS	·	880 m	MPC · JPL
340065	2005 VC_{56}	—	November 4, 2005	Kitt Peak	Spacewatch	·	990 m	MPC · JPL
340066	2005 VD_{56}	—	November 4, 2005	Kitt Peak	Spacewatch	HIL · 3:2	6.0 km	MPC · JPL
340067	2005 VB_{67}	—	October 28, 2005	Kitt Peak	Spacewatch	V	660 m	MPC · JPL
340068	2005 VV_{71}	—	November 1, 2005	Mount Lemmon	Mount Lemmon Survey	MAS	780 m	MPC · JPL
340069	2005 VW_{78}	—	November 6, 2005	Mount Lemmon	Mount Lemmon Survey	·	1.0 km	MPC · JPL
340070	2005 VH_{81}	—	November 5, 2005	Kitt Peak	Spacewatch	·	1.1 km	MPC · JPL
340071 Vanmunster	2005 VF_{82}	Vanmunster	November 9, 2005	Uccle	P. De Cat	·	1.2 km	MPC · JPL
340072	2005 VO_{107}	—	November 5, 2005	Kitt Peak	Spacewatch	·	960 m	MPC · JPL
340073	2005 VV_{113}	—	November 10, 2005	Kitt Peak	Spacewatch	·	1.3 km	MPC · JPL
340074	2005 VA_{118}	—	November 12, 2005	Kitt Peak	Spacewatch	·	2.9 km	MPC · JPL
340075	2005 WQ_{5}	—	November 21, 2005	Kitt Peak	Spacewatch	·	1.7 km	MPC · JPL
340076	2005 WX_{6}	—	November 21, 2005	Catalina	CSS	·	1.2 km	MPC · JPL
340077	2005 WP_{7}	—	November 21, 2005	Junk Bond	D. Healy	MAS · fast	820 m	MPC · JPL
340078	2005 WM_{10}	—	November 22, 2005	Kitt Peak	Spacewatch	NYS	1.4 km	MPC · JPL
340079	2005 WH_{17}	—	November 22, 2005	Kitt Peak	Spacewatch	·	860 m	MPC · JPL
340080	2005 WA_{25}	—	November 21, 2005	Kitt Peak	Spacewatch	NYS	1.2 km	MPC · JPL
340081	2005 WC_{25}	—	November 21, 2005	Kitt Peak	Spacewatch	·	1.5 km	MPC · JPL
340082	2005 WF_{26}	—	November 21, 2005	Kitt Peak	Spacewatch	3:2 · SHU	4.9 km	MPC · JPL
340083	2005 WK_{27}	—	November 21, 2005	Kitt Peak	Spacewatch	MAS	780 m	MPC · JPL
340084	2005 WR_{28}	—	November 21, 2005	Kitt Peak	Spacewatch	·	1.0 km	MPC · JPL
340085	2005 WZ_{28}	—	November 21, 2005	Kitt Peak	Spacewatch	·	1.1 km	MPC · JPL
340086	2005 WL_{33}	—	November 21, 2005	Kitt Peak	Spacewatch	T_{j} (2.98) · 3:2	7.4 km	MPC · JPL
340087	2005 WE_{38}	—	November 22, 2005	Kitt Peak	Spacewatch	·	1.2 km	MPC · JPL
340088	2005 WV_{39}	—	November 25, 2005	Mount Lemmon	Mount Lemmon Survey	MAS	860 m	MPC · JPL
340089	2005 WZ_{42}	—	November 21, 2005	Kitt Peak	Spacewatch	ERI	1.7 km	MPC · JPL
340090	2005 WW_{47}	—	November 25, 2005	Kitt Peak	Spacewatch	MAS	820 m	MPC · JPL
340091	2005 WZ_{47}	—	November 25, 2005	Kitt Peak	Spacewatch	·	1.4 km	MPC · JPL
340092	2005 WK_{55}	—	November 26, 2005	Mount Lemmon	Mount Lemmon Survey	·	960 m	MPC · JPL
340093	2005 WR_{56}	—	November 29, 2005	Socorro	LINEAR	·	1.1 km	MPC · JPL
340094	2005 WM_{67}	—	November 22, 2005	Kitt Peak	Spacewatch	ERI	2.1 km	MPC · JPL
340095	2005 WY_{70}	—	November 21, 2005	Kitt Peak	Spacewatch	·	1.8 km	MPC · JPL
340096	2005 WS_{73}	—	November 26, 2005	Mount Lemmon	Mount Lemmon Survey	V	920 m	MPC · JPL
340097	2005 WF_{75}	—	November 25, 2005	Kitt Peak	Spacewatch	NYS ·	1.5 km	MPC · JPL
340098	2005 WQ_{96}	—	November 26, 2005	Kitt Peak	Spacewatch	MAS	700 m	MPC · JPL
340099	2005 WV_{100}	—	November 29, 2005	Socorro	LINEAR	·	1.3 km	MPC · JPL
340100	2005 WO_{105}	—	November 29, 2005	Kitt Peak	Spacewatch	fast	1.4 km	MPC · JPL

== 340101–340200 ==
back to top

Designation			Discovery			Properties		Ref
Permanent	Provisional	Named after	Date	Site	Discoverer(s)	Category	Diam.	Ref
340101	2005 WO_{108}	—	November 29, 2005	Socorro	LINEAR	MAS	840 m	MPC · JPL
340102	2005 WS_{109}	—	November 30, 2005	Kitt Peak	Spacewatch	3:2 · SHU	5.7 km	MPC · JPL
340103	2005 WE_{116}	—	November 30, 2005	Socorro	LINEAR	·	1.3 km	MPC · JPL
340104	2005 WR_{117}	—	November 28, 2005	Socorro	LINEAR	·	1.8 km	MPC · JPL
340105	2005 WC_{118}	—	November 28, 2005	Catalina	CSS	·	1.2 km	MPC · JPL
340106	2005 WW_{120}	—	November 30, 2005	Socorro	LINEAR	·	890 m	MPC · JPL
340107	2005 WY_{128}	—	November 25, 2005	Mount Lemmon	Mount Lemmon Survey	3:2	4.6 km	MPC · JPL
340108	2005 WY_{139}	—	November 26, 2005	Mount Lemmon	Mount Lemmon Survey	·	1.1 km	MPC · JPL
340109	2005 WC_{147}	—	November 25, 2005	Kitt Peak	Spacewatch	·	1.3 km	MPC · JPL
340110	2005 WO_{147}	—	November 25, 2005	Catalina	CSS	V	710 m	MPC · JPL
340111	2005 WZ_{155}	—	November 29, 2005	Palomar	NEAT	T_{j} (2.97) · HIL · 3:2	5.9 km	MPC · JPL
340112	2005 WY_{164}	—	October 22, 2005	Kitt Peak	Spacewatch	·	1.7 km	MPC · JPL
340113	2005 WM_{168}	—	November 30, 2005	Kitt Peak	Spacewatch	·	1.7 km	MPC · JPL
340114	2005 WW_{170}	—	November 30, 2005	Kitt Peak	Spacewatch	·	1.7 km	MPC · JPL
340115	2005 WE_{176}	—	November 30, 2005	Kitt Peak	Spacewatch	·	910 m	MPC · JPL
340116	2005 WF_{192}	—	November 25, 2005	Catalina	CSS	·	1.2 km	MPC · JPL
340117	2005 WT_{192}	—	November 26, 2005	Socorro	LINEAR	·	1.2 km	MPC · JPL
340118	2005 WW_{192}	—	November 26, 2005	Catalina	CSS	·	1.2 km	MPC · JPL
340119	2005 WO_{193}	—	November 28, 2005	Socorro	LINEAR	·	1.1 km	MPC · JPL
340120	2005 WL_{197}	—	November 21, 2005	Kitt Peak	Spacewatch	NYS	1.1 km	MPC · JPL
340121	2005 WX_{199}	—	November 25, 2005	Kitt Peak	Spacewatch	HIL · 3:2	6.0 km	MPC · JPL
340122	2005 WG_{201}	—	November 28, 2005	Kitt Peak	Spacewatch	·	1.2 km	MPC · JPL
340123	2005 WY_{207}	—	November 29, 2005	Mount Lemmon	Mount Lemmon Survey	MAS	800 m	MPC · JPL
340124	2005 XD_{3}	—	December 1, 2005	Socorro	LINEAR	·	2.3 km	MPC · JPL
340125	2005 XH_{5}	—	December 4, 2005	Kitt Peak	Spacewatch	·	4.4 km	MPC · JPL
340126	2005 XQ_{16}	—	December 1, 2005	Kitt Peak	Spacewatch	·	1.1 km	MPC · JPL
340127	2005 XG_{18}	—	December 1, 2005	Kitt Peak	Spacewatch	NYS	1.4 km	MPC · JPL
340128	2005 XX_{28}	—	December 2, 2005	Socorro	LINEAR	NYS	1.1 km	MPC · JPL
340129	2005 XL_{36}	—	December 4, 2005	Kitt Peak	Spacewatch	MAS	700 m	MPC · JPL
340130	2005 XK_{41}	—	December 6, 2005	Kitt Peak	Spacewatch	·	900 m	MPC · JPL
340131	2005 XY_{51}	—	December 2, 2005	Kitt Peak	Spacewatch	NYS	970 m	MPC · JPL
340132	2005 XT_{73}	—	December 6, 2005	Kitt Peak	Spacewatch	·	1.6 km	MPC · JPL
340133	2005 XD_{82}	—	December 8, 2005	Mount Lemmon	Mount Lemmon Survey	NYS	1.3 km	MPC · JPL
340134	2005 XG_{84}	—	December 8, 2005	Catalina	CSS	·	1.4 km	MPC · JPL
340135	2005 XH_{117}	—	December 7, 2005	Kitt Peak	Spacewatch	V	790 m	MPC · JPL
340136	2005 YK_{6}	—	December 21, 2005	Catalina	CSS	·	1.9 km	MPC · JPL
340137	2005 YS_{13}	—	December 22, 2005	Kitt Peak	Spacewatch	·	1.4 km	MPC · JPL
340138	2005 YK_{24}	—	December 24, 2005	Kitt Peak	Spacewatch	·	1.5 km	MPC · JPL
340139	2005 YX_{24}	—	December 24, 2005	Kitt Peak	Spacewatch	NYS	1.4 km	MPC · JPL
340140	2005 YW_{25}	—	December 24, 2005	Kitt Peak	Spacewatch	NYS	1.2 km	MPC · JPL
340141	2005 YQ_{33}	—	December 24, 2005	Kitt Peak	Spacewatch	NYS	1.2 km	MPC · JPL
340142	2005 YM_{39}	—	December 26, 2005	Catalina	CSS	·	1.5 km	MPC · JPL
340143	2005 YV_{42}	—	December 24, 2005	Kitt Peak	Spacewatch	·	2.0 km	MPC · JPL
340144	2005 YJ_{43}	—	December 24, 2005	Kitt Peak	Spacewatch	PHO	1.4 km	MPC · JPL
340145	2005 YG_{52}	—	December 26, 2005	Mount Lemmon	Mount Lemmon Survey	·	2.0 km	MPC · JPL
340146	2005 YH_{52}	—	December 26, 2005	Mount Lemmon	Mount Lemmon Survey	NYS	1.2 km	MPC · JPL
340147	2005 YA_{54}	—	December 24, 2005	Kitt Peak	Spacewatch	MAS	740 m	MPC · JPL
340148	2005 YG_{62}	—	December 24, 2005	Kitt Peak	Spacewatch	3:2 · SHU	6.9 km	MPC · JPL
340149	2005 YL_{63}	—	December 24, 2005	Kitt Peak	Spacewatch	V	860 m	MPC · JPL
340150	2005 YB_{71}	—	December 22, 2005	Kitt Peak	Spacewatch	·	1.4 km	MPC · JPL
340151	2005 YX_{73}	—	December 24, 2005	Kitt Peak	Spacewatch	·	1.5 km	MPC · JPL
340152	2005 YV_{82}	—	December 24, 2005	Kitt Peak	Spacewatch	·	1.5 km	MPC · JPL
340153	2005 YP_{83}	—	December 24, 2005	Kitt Peak	Spacewatch	MAS	580 m	MPC · JPL
340154	2005 YN_{89}	—	December 26, 2005	Mount Lemmon	Mount Lemmon Survey	·	1.0 km	MPC · JPL
340155	2005 YW_{92}	—	December 27, 2005	Mount Lemmon	Mount Lemmon Survey	·	1.1 km	MPC · JPL
340156	2005 YR_{97}	—	December 24, 2005	Kitt Peak	Spacewatch	·	980 m	MPC · JPL
340157	2005 YG_{99}	—	December 28, 2005	Mount Lemmon	Mount Lemmon Survey	·	1.2 km	MPC · JPL
340158	2005 YD_{100}	—	December 28, 2005	Kitt Peak	Spacewatch	·	1.2 km	MPC · JPL
340159	2005 YQ_{103}	—	December 25, 2005	Kitt Peak	Spacewatch	·	1.6 km	MPC · JPL
340160	2005 YV_{112}	—	December 25, 2005	Mount Lemmon	Mount Lemmon Survey	CLA	1.8 km	MPC · JPL
340161	2005 YE_{114}	—	December 25, 2005	Kitt Peak	Spacewatch	NYS	1.4 km	MPC · JPL
340162	2005 YD_{120}	—	December 27, 2005	Mount Lemmon	Mount Lemmon Survey	·	1.6 km	MPC · JPL
340163	2005 YO_{133}	—	December 26, 2005	Kitt Peak	Spacewatch	·	1.7 km	MPC · JPL
340164	2005 YY_{138}	—	December 27, 2005	Mount Lemmon	Mount Lemmon Survey	EUN	1.5 km	MPC · JPL
340165	2005 YS_{140}	—	December 28, 2005	Mount Lemmon	Mount Lemmon Survey	·	990 m	MPC · JPL
340166	2005 YM_{144}	—	December 28, 2005	Mount Lemmon	Mount Lemmon Survey	NYS	920 m	MPC · JPL
340167	2005 YE_{146}	—	December 29, 2005	Mount Lemmon	Mount Lemmon Survey	·	1.5 km	MPC · JPL
340168	2005 YA_{148}	—	December 25, 2005	Kitt Peak	Spacewatch	NYS	1.4 km	MPC · JPL
340169	2005 YH_{151}	—	December 25, 2005	Kitt Peak	Spacewatch	NYS	1.1 km	MPC · JPL
340170	2005 YT_{151}	—	December 26, 2005	Kitt Peak	Spacewatch	NYS	1.3 km	MPC · JPL
340171	2005 YU_{153}	—	December 29, 2005	Socorro	LINEAR	·	1.6 km	MPC · JPL
340172	2005 YJ_{166}	—	December 27, 2005	Kitt Peak	Spacewatch	·	2.0 km	MPC · JPL
340173	2005 YD_{173}	—	December 24, 2005	Socorro	LINEAR	·	1.7 km	MPC · JPL
340174	2005 YT_{176}	—	December 22, 2005	Kitt Peak	Spacewatch	·	1.6 km	MPC · JPL
340175	2005 YK_{178}	—	December 24, 2005	Kitt Peak	Spacewatch	NYS	1.6 km	MPC · JPL
340176	2005 YL_{182}	—	December 30, 2005	Socorro	LINEAR	·	1.2 km	MPC · JPL
340177	2005 YM_{182}	—	December 30, 2005	Socorro	LINEAR	·	2.1 km	MPC · JPL
340178	2005 YS_{182}	—	December 27, 2005	Kitt Peak	Spacewatch	·	2.5 km	MPC · JPL
340179	2005 YN_{188}	—	December 28, 2005	Mount Lemmon	Mount Lemmon Survey	MAS	560 m	MPC · JPL
340180	2005 YQ_{188}	—	December 28, 2005	Mount Lemmon	Mount Lemmon Survey	·	1.2 km	MPC · JPL
340181	2005 YY_{188}	—	December 28, 2005	Mount Lemmon	Mount Lemmon Survey	H	570 m	MPC · JPL
340182	2005 YO_{192}	—	December 30, 2005	Kitt Peak	Spacewatch	·	1.4 km	MPC · JPL
340183	2005 YX_{192}	—	December 30, 2005	Kitt Peak	Spacewatch	V	960 m	MPC · JPL
340184	2005 YN_{196}	—	December 24, 2005	Kitt Peak	Spacewatch	3:2	4.5 km	MPC · JPL
340185	2005 YT_{203}	—	December 25, 2005	Mount Lemmon	Mount Lemmon Survey	·	1.3 km	MPC · JPL
340186	2005 YX_{206}	—	December 27, 2005	Kitt Peak	Spacewatch	NYS	960 m	MPC · JPL
340187	2005 YE_{219}	—	December 31, 2005	Kitt Peak	Spacewatch	·	3.3 km	MPC · JPL
340188	2005 YJ_{230}	—	December 26, 2005	Kitt Peak	Spacewatch	NYS	1.3 km	MPC · JPL
340189	2005 YP_{230}	—	December 26, 2005	Kitt Peak	Spacewatch	·	1.6 km	MPC · JPL
340190	2005 YT_{240}	—	December 29, 2005	Kitt Peak	Spacewatch	·	1.4 km	MPC · JPL
340191	2005 YS_{266}	—	December 25, 2005	Kitt Peak	Spacewatch	·	1.2 km	MPC · JPL
340192	2005 YP_{267}	—	December 25, 2005	Mount Lemmon	Mount Lemmon Survey	·	1.2 km	MPC · JPL
340193	2005 YB_{268}	—	December 25, 2005	Mount Lemmon	Mount Lemmon Survey	·	2.3 km	MPC · JPL
340194	2005 YE_{271}	—	December 28, 2005	Kitt Peak	Spacewatch	·	1.2 km	MPC · JPL
340195	2005 YA_{275}	—	December 25, 2005	Catalina	CSS	·	1.8 km	MPC · JPL
340196	2005 YX_{275}	—	March 10, 2003	Kitt Peak	Spacewatch	NYS	1.2 km	MPC · JPL
340197	2005 YL_{290}	—	December 25, 2005	Mount Lemmon	Mount Lemmon Survey	·	1.0 km	MPC · JPL
340198	2005 YV_{291}	—	December 30, 2005	Kitt Peak	Spacewatch	·	1.6 km	MPC · JPL
340199	2006 AQ_{5}	—	January 2, 2006	Catalina	CSS	·	2.5 km	MPC · JPL
340200	2006 AL_{9}	—	January 4, 2006	Kitt Peak	Spacewatch	·	1.4 km	MPC · JPL

== 340201–340300 ==
back to top

Designation			Discovery			Properties		Ref
Permanent	Provisional	Named after	Date	Site	Discoverer(s)	Category	Diam.	Ref
340201	2006 AB_{15}	—	January 5, 2006	Mount Lemmon	Mount Lemmon Survey	·	1.3 km	MPC · JPL
340202	2006 AZ_{15}	—	January 4, 2006	Mount Lemmon	Mount Lemmon Survey	·	1.6 km	MPC · JPL
340203	2006 AR_{19}	—	January 5, 2006	Kitt Peak	Spacewatch	·	1.1 km	MPC · JPL
340204	2006 AD_{33}	—	January 6, 2006	Socorro	LINEAR	ERI	3.0 km	MPC · JPL
340205	2006 AE_{33}	—	January 6, 2006	Socorro	LINEAR	·	2.3 km	MPC · JPL
340206	2006 AF_{33}	—	January 6, 2006	Socorro	LINEAR	·	1.8 km	MPC · JPL
340207	2006 AA_{34}	—	January 6, 2006	Socorro	LINEAR	·	1.2 km	MPC · JPL
340208	2006 AA_{40}	—	January 7, 2006	Mount Lemmon	Mount Lemmon Survey	·	3.6 km	MPC · JPL
340209	2006 AY_{52}	—	January 5, 2006	Kitt Peak	Spacewatch	NYS	940 m	MPC · JPL
340210	2006 AU_{54}	—	January 5, 2006	Kitt Peak	Spacewatch	·	960 m	MPC · JPL
340211	2006 AR_{61}	—	January 5, 2006	Kitt Peak	Spacewatch	NYS · fast	940 m	MPC · JPL
340212	2006 AW_{69}	—	January 6, 2006	Kitt Peak	Spacewatch	NYS	1.4 km	MPC · JPL
340213	2006 AK_{72}	—	January 6, 2006	Mount Lemmon	Mount Lemmon Survey	V	890 m	MPC · JPL
340214	2006 AV_{74}	—	January 5, 2006	Catalina	CSS	·	2.4 km	MPC · JPL
340215	2006 AO_{84}	—	January 6, 2006	Socorro	LINEAR	T_{j} (2.96) · HIL	5.2 km	MPC · JPL
340216	2006 AA_{93}	—	December 29, 2005	Kitt Peak	Spacewatch	(5)	1.3 km	MPC · JPL
340217	2006 AJ_{96}	—	January 6, 2006	Catalina	CSS	EUN	1.6 km	MPC · JPL
340218	2006 AP_{98}	—	January 7, 2006	Catalina	CSS	·	2.6 km	MPC · JPL
340219	2006 AQ_{105}	—	January 7, 2006	Mount Lemmon	Mount Lemmon Survey	·	1.3 km	MPC · JPL
340220	2006 BP	—	January 20, 2006	Catalina	CSS	EUN	2.0 km	MPC · JPL
340221	2006 BV_{11}	—	January 21, 2006	Kitt Peak	Spacewatch	·	1.4 km	MPC · JPL
340222	2006 BM_{24}	—	January 23, 2006	Mount Lemmon	Mount Lemmon Survey	·	1.2 km	MPC · JPL
340223	2006 BS_{32}	—	January 21, 2006	Kitt Peak	Spacewatch	·	1.8 km	MPC · JPL
340224	2006 BY_{50}	—	January 25, 2006	Mount Lemmon	Mount Lemmon Survey	3:2 · SHU	7.0 km	MPC · JPL
340225	2006 BR_{54}	—	January 25, 2006	Kitt Peak	Spacewatch	·	1.0 km	MPC · JPL
340226	2006 BV_{60}	—	January 18, 2006	Catalina	CSS	PHO	1.2 km	MPC · JPL
340227	2006 BZ_{62}	—	January 20, 2006	Kitt Peak	Spacewatch	MAR	1.3 km	MPC · JPL
340228	2006 BZ_{65}	—	January 23, 2006	Kitt Peak	Spacewatch	SUL	2.2 km	MPC · JPL
340229	2006 BS_{68}	—	January 23, 2006	Kitt Peak	Spacewatch	·	1.1 km	MPC · JPL
340230	2006 BN_{72}	—	January 23, 2006	Kitt Peak	Spacewatch	KON	1.9 km	MPC · JPL
340231	2006 BH_{74}	—	January 23, 2006	Kitt Peak	Spacewatch	·	1.2 km	MPC · JPL
340232	2006 BP_{77}	—	January 23, 2006	Catalina	CSS	·	1.6 km	MPC · JPL
340233	2006 BM_{80}	—	January 23, 2006	Kitt Peak	Spacewatch	·	2.3 km	MPC · JPL
340234	2006 BH_{81}	—	January 23, 2006	Kitt Peak	Spacewatch	·	2.2 km	MPC · JPL
340235	2006 BL_{81}	—	January 23, 2006	Kitt Peak	Spacewatch	EUN	1.4 km	MPC · JPL
340236	2006 BE_{85}	—	January 25, 2006	Kitt Peak	Spacewatch	L5	9.9 km	MPC · JPL
340237	2006 BU_{85}	—	January 25, 2006	Catalina	CSS	·	2.1 km	MPC · JPL
340238	2006 BL_{88}	—	January 25, 2006	Kitt Peak	Spacewatch	·	1.1 km	MPC · JPL
340239	2006 BA_{91}	—	January 26, 2006	Kitt Peak	Spacewatch	·	1.2 km	MPC · JPL
340240	2006 BJ_{93}	—	January 26, 2006	Kitt Peak	Spacewatch	·	1.5 km	MPC · JPL
340241	2006 BK_{93}	—	January 26, 2006	Kitt Peak	Spacewatch	·	2.2 km	MPC · JPL
340242	2006 BB_{100}	—	January 22, 2006	Catalina	CSS	·	1.9 km	MPC · JPL
340243	2006 BZ_{109}	—	January 25, 2006	Kitt Peak	Spacewatch	NYS	1.4 km	MPC · JPL
340244	2006 BR_{115}	—	January 26, 2006	Kitt Peak	Spacewatch	·	1.6 km	MPC · JPL
340245	2006 BW_{115}	—	January 26, 2006	Kitt Peak	Spacewatch	·	2.2 km	MPC · JPL
340246	2006 BU_{117}	—	January 26, 2006	Mount Lemmon	Mount Lemmon Survey	·	1.3 km	MPC · JPL
340247	2006 BP_{118}	—	January 26, 2006	Kitt Peak	Spacewatch	·	1.4 km	MPC · JPL
340248	2006 BB_{121}	—	January 26, 2006	Kitt Peak	Spacewatch	MAR	1.3 km	MPC · JPL
340249	2006 BG_{123}	—	January 26, 2006	Kitt Peak	Spacewatch	·	1.4 km	MPC · JPL
340250	2006 BK_{124}	—	January 26, 2006	Kitt Peak	Spacewatch	·	950 m	MPC · JPL
340251	2006 BB_{128}	—	January 26, 2006	Kitt Peak	Spacewatch	·	3.7 km	MPC · JPL
340252	2006 BB_{130}	—	January 26, 2006	Kitt Peak	Spacewatch	·	1.5 km	MPC · JPL
340253	2006 BJ_{131}	—	January 26, 2006	Mount Lemmon	Mount Lemmon Survey	·	880 m	MPC · JPL
340254	2006 BL_{133}	—	January 26, 2006	Kitt Peak	Spacewatch	BRG	2.5 km	MPC · JPL
340255	2006 BK_{136}	—	January 28, 2006	Mount Lemmon	Mount Lemmon Survey	MAS	710 m	MPC · JPL
340256	2006 BW_{139}	—	January 30, 2006	Cordell-Lorenz	Cordell-Lorenz	·	1.6 km	MPC · JPL
340257	2006 BU_{142}	—	January 26, 2006	Mount Lemmon	Mount Lemmon Survey	·	1.7 km	MPC · JPL
340258	2006 BF_{148}	—	January 22, 2006	Catalina	CSS	H	510 m	MPC · JPL
340259	2006 BG_{151}	—	January 25, 2006	Kitt Peak	Spacewatch	·	1.7 km	MPC · JPL
340260	2006 BY_{153}	—	January 25, 2006	Anderson Mesa	LONEOS	EUN	1.5 km	MPC · JPL
340261	2006 BY_{155}	—	January 25, 2006	Kitt Peak	Spacewatch	(5)	1.8 km	MPC · JPL
340262	2006 BH_{156}	—	January 25, 2006	Kitt Peak	Spacewatch	L5	10 km	MPC · JPL
340263	2006 BX_{157}	—	January 25, 2006	Kitt Peak	Spacewatch	·	1.6 km	MPC · JPL
340264	2006 BU_{158}	—	January 26, 2006	Kitt Peak	Spacewatch	·	2.1 km	MPC · JPL
340265	2006 BO_{161}	—	January 26, 2006	Anderson Mesa	LONEOS	·	3.0 km	MPC · JPL
340266	2006 BM_{163}	—	January 26, 2006	Mount Lemmon	Mount Lemmon Survey	·	1.2 km	MPC · JPL
340267	2006 BW_{172}	—	January 27, 2006	Kitt Peak	Spacewatch	·	1.2 km	MPC · JPL
340268	2006 BY_{178}	—	January 27, 2006	Anderson Mesa	LONEOS	·	1.4 km	MPC · JPL
340269	2006 BW_{181}	—	January 27, 2006	Mount Lemmon	Mount Lemmon Survey	·	1.1 km	MPC · JPL
340270	2006 BL_{183}	—	January 27, 2006	Anderson Mesa	LONEOS	T_{j} (2.96) · 3:2	5.3 km	MPC · JPL
340271	2006 BY_{184}	—	January 28, 2006	Mount Lemmon	Mount Lemmon Survey	·	1.3 km	MPC · JPL
340272	2006 BO_{190}	—	January 28, 2006	Kitt Peak	Spacewatch	·	1.7 km	MPC · JPL
340273	2006 BP_{193}	—	January 30, 2006	Kitt Peak	Spacewatch	·	1.3 km	MPC · JPL
340274	2006 BU_{195}	—	January 30, 2006	Kitt Peak	Spacewatch	·	1.4 km	MPC · JPL
340275	2006 BY_{212}	—	January 31, 2006	Kitt Peak	Spacewatch	EUN	1.2 km	MPC · JPL
340276	2006 BD_{217}	—	January 27, 2006	Anderson Mesa	LONEOS	·	1.6 km	MPC · JPL
340277	2006 BC_{223}	—	January 30, 2006	Kitt Peak	Spacewatch	·	1.6 km	MPC · JPL
340278	2006 BK_{223}	—	January 30, 2006	Kitt Peak	Spacewatch	·	1.2 km	MPC · JPL
340279	2006 BY_{228}	—	January 31, 2006	Kitt Peak	Spacewatch	NYS	1.1 km	MPC · JPL
340280	2006 BA_{229}	—	January 31, 2006	Kitt Peak	Spacewatch	·	1.4 km	MPC · JPL
340281	2006 BL_{233}	—	January 31, 2006	Kitt Peak	Spacewatch	·	1.0 km	MPC · JPL
340282	2006 BD_{261}	—	January 31, 2006	Kitt Peak	Spacewatch	RAF	1.4 km	MPC · JPL
340283	2006 BG_{265}	—	January 31, 2006	Kitt Peak	Spacewatch	·	1.6 km	MPC · JPL
340284	2006 BE_{269}	—	January 27, 2006	Catalina	CSS	·	2.0 km	MPC · JPL
340285	2006 BZ_{270}	—	January 26, 2006	Catalina	CSS	NYS	1.6 km	MPC · JPL
340286	2006 BX_{273}	—	January 23, 2006	Kitt Peak	Spacewatch	·	1.7 km	MPC · JPL
340287	2006 BY_{277}	—	January 23, 2006	Kitt Peak	Spacewatch	·	1.4 km	MPC · JPL
340288	2006 BD_{279}	—	January 31, 2006	Kitt Peak	Spacewatch	L5	8.7 km	MPC · JPL
340289	2006 BB_{280}	—	January 23, 2006	Kitt Peak	Spacewatch	L5	9.3 km	MPC · JPL
340290	2006 BH_{282}	—	January 23, 2006	Kitt Peak	Spacewatch	·	1.4 km	MPC · JPL
340291	2006 CV	—	February 3, 2006	Catalina	CSS	APO	380 m	MPC · JPL
340292	2006 CD_{3}	—	February 1, 2006	Mount Lemmon	Mount Lemmon Survey	(5)	1.2 km	MPC · JPL
340293	2006 CX_{3}	—	February 1, 2006	Mount Lemmon	Mount Lemmon Survey	·	1.9 km	MPC · JPL
340294	2006 CO_{5}	—	February 1, 2006	Mount Lemmon	Mount Lemmon Survey	·	1.2 km	MPC · JPL
340295	2006 CX_{7}	—	February 1, 2006	Mount Lemmon	Mount Lemmon Survey	HNS	1.7 km	MPC · JPL
340296	2006 CE_{9}	—	February 2, 2006	Mount Lemmon	Mount Lemmon Survey	H	600 m	MPC · JPL
340297	2006 CU_{11}	—	February 1, 2006	Kitt Peak	Spacewatch	·	1.3 km	MPC · JPL
340298	2006 CB_{29}	—	February 2, 2006	Kitt Peak	Spacewatch	·	1.2 km	MPC · JPL
340299	2006 CS_{40}	—	February 2, 2006	Mount Lemmon	Mount Lemmon Survey	·	1.9 km	MPC · JPL
340300	2006 CT_{40}	—	February 2, 2006	Mount Lemmon	Mount Lemmon Survey	·	1.3 km	MPC · JPL

== 340301–340400 ==
back to top

Designation			Discovery			Properties		Ref
Permanent	Provisional	Named after	Date	Site	Discoverer(s)	Category	Diam.	Ref
340301	2006 CP_{45}	—	February 3, 2006	Kitt Peak	Spacewatch	·	1.2 km	MPC · JPL
340302	2006 CM_{47}	—	February 3, 2006	Kitt Peak	Spacewatch	·	1.5 km	MPC · JPL
340303	2006 CO_{50}	—	February 3, 2006	Mount Lemmon	Mount Lemmon Survey	·	3.1 km	MPC · JPL
340304	2006 CL_{52}	—	July 8, 2003	Palomar	NEAT	·	2.4 km	MPC · JPL
340305	2006 CF_{60}	—	February 1, 2006	Catalina	CSS	·	3.5 km	MPC · JPL
340306	2006 CD_{69}	—	February 4, 2006	Kitt Peak	Spacewatch	L5	9.7 km	MPC · JPL
340307	2006 DJ	—	February 17, 2006	Pla D'Arguines	R. Ferrando, Ferrando, M.	·	2.6 km	MPC · JPL
340308	2006 DH_{1}	—	February 21, 2006	Catalina	CSS	H	620 m	MPC · JPL
340309	2006 DD_{2}	—	February 20, 2006	Kitt Peak	Spacewatch	·	2.2 km	MPC · JPL
340310	2006 DR_{2}	—	February 20, 2006	Kitt Peak	Spacewatch	·	1.3 km	MPC · JPL
340311	2006 DY_{4}	—	May 5, 2002	Palomar	NEAT	·	2.3 km	MPC · JPL
340312	2006 DK_{6}	—	February 20, 2006	Catalina	CSS	H	710 m	MPC · JPL
340313	2006 DV_{7}	—	February 20, 2006	Kitt Peak	Spacewatch	·	2.0 km	MPC · JPL
340314	2006 DA_{8}	—	February 20, 2006	Kitt Peak	Spacewatch	·	1.6 km	MPC · JPL
340315	2006 DW_{11}	—	February 20, 2006	Kitt Peak	Spacewatch	·	1.0 km	MPC · JPL
340316	2006 DY_{16}	—	February 20, 2006	Kitt Peak	Spacewatch	·	1.7 km	MPC · JPL
340317	2006 DK_{17}	—	February 20, 2006	Kitt Peak	Spacewatch	(5)	1.3 km	MPC · JPL
340318	2006 DR_{19}	—	February 20, 2006	Kitt Peak	Spacewatch	·	1.1 km	MPC · JPL
340319	2006 DT_{19}	—	February 20, 2006	Kitt Peak	Spacewatch	·	1.9 km	MPC · JPL
340320	2006 DC_{23}	—	February 20, 2006	Kitt Peak	Spacewatch	·	1.4 km	MPC · JPL
340321	2006 DW_{26}	—	February 20, 2006	Kitt Peak	Spacewatch	·	1.8 km	MPC · JPL
340322	2006 DM_{28}	—	February 20, 2006	Kitt Peak	Spacewatch	L5	12 km	MPC · JPL
340323	2006 DO_{31}	—	February 20, 2006	Mount Lemmon	Mount Lemmon Survey	L5	10 km	MPC · JPL
340324	2006 DV_{32}	—	February 20, 2006	Mount Lemmon	Mount Lemmon Survey	·	1.6 km	MPC · JPL
340325	2006 DB_{34}	—	February 20, 2006	Kitt Peak	Spacewatch	·	1.1 km	MPC · JPL
340326	2006 DN_{35}	—	February 20, 2006	Mount Lemmon	Mount Lemmon Survey	·	1.9 km	MPC · JPL
340327	2006 DN_{36}	—	February 20, 2006	Mount Lemmon	Mount Lemmon Survey	L5	10 km	MPC · JPL
340328	2006 DX_{36}	—	February 20, 2006	Kitt Peak	Spacewatch	·	1.5 km	MPC · JPL
340329	2006 DP_{37}	—	February 20, 2006	Mount Lemmon	Mount Lemmon Survey	·	3.1 km	MPC · JPL
340330	2006 DU_{37}	—	February 20, 2006	Mount Lemmon	Mount Lemmon Survey	HNS	1.7 km	MPC · JPL
340331	2006 DP_{38}	—	February 21, 2006	Mount Lemmon	Mount Lemmon Survey	·	1.0 km	MPC · JPL
340332	2006 DT_{39}	—	February 22, 2006	Catalina	CSS	·	1.7 km	MPC · JPL
340333	2006 DN_{40}	—	February 22, 2006	Anderson Mesa	LONEOS	·	3.0 km	MPC · JPL
340334	2006 DK_{43}	—	February 20, 2006	Kitt Peak	Spacewatch	·	1.3 km	MPC · JPL
340335	2006 DZ_{44}	—	February 20, 2006	Kitt Peak	Spacewatch	L5	7.8 km	MPC · JPL
340336	2006 DO_{46}	—	February 20, 2006	Catalina	CSS	·	2.7 km	MPC · JPL
340337	2006 DR_{47}	—	February 21, 2006	Mount Lemmon	Mount Lemmon Survey	·	2.0 km	MPC · JPL
340338	2006 DQ_{52}	—	February 24, 2006	Kitt Peak	Spacewatch	MAS	570 m	MPC · JPL
340339	2006 DR_{52}	—	February 24, 2006	Kitt Peak	Spacewatch	·	1.5 km	MPC · JPL
340340	2006 DG_{54}	—	February 24, 2006	Kitt Peak	Spacewatch	·	1.4 km	MPC · JPL
340341	2006 DP_{55}	—	February 24, 2006	Palomar	NEAT	(194)	2.4 km	MPC · JPL
340342	2006 DD_{56}	—	February 24, 2006	Mount Lemmon	Mount Lemmon Survey	L5	13 km	MPC · JPL
340343	2006 DV_{57}	—	February 24, 2006	Mount Lemmon	Mount Lemmon Survey	·	1.2 km	MPC · JPL
340344	2006 DQ_{58}	—	February 24, 2006	Mount Lemmon	Mount Lemmon Survey	·	2.0 km	MPC · JPL
340345	2006 DY_{58}	—	February 24, 2006	Kitt Peak	Spacewatch	·	980 m	MPC · JPL
340346	2006 DL_{63}	—	February 25, 2006	Goodricke-Pigott	R. A. Tucker	·	3.8 km	MPC · JPL
340347	2006 DJ_{67}	—	February 22, 2006	Catalina	CSS	·	3.6 km	MPC · JPL
340348	2006 DS_{70}	—	February 21, 2006	Mount Lemmon	Mount Lemmon Survey	L5	12 km	MPC · JPL
340349	2006 DT_{73}	—	February 23, 2006	Kitt Peak	Spacewatch	HNS	1.2 km	MPC · JPL
340350	2006 DX_{75}	—	February 24, 2006	Kitt Peak	Spacewatch	L5	8.9 km	MPC · JPL
340351	2006 DH_{80}	—	February 24, 2006	Kitt Peak	Spacewatch	·	2.3 km	MPC · JPL
340352	2006 DY_{84}	—	February 24, 2006	Kitt Peak	Spacewatch	·	1.1 km	MPC · JPL
340353	2006 DP_{89}	—	February 24, 2006	Kitt Peak	Spacewatch	·	1.6 km	MPC · JPL
340354	2006 DV_{90}	—	February 24, 2006	Kitt Peak	Spacewatch	·	1.7 km	MPC · JPL
340355	2006 DM_{91}	—	February 24, 2006	Kitt Peak	Spacewatch	·	2.2 km	MPC · JPL
340356	2006 DO_{94}	—	February 24, 2006	Kitt Peak	Spacewatch	·	1.2 km	MPC · JPL
340357	2006 DP_{94}	—	February 24, 2006	Kitt Peak	Spacewatch	·	1.6 km	MPC · JPL
340358	2006 DZ_{94}	—	February 24, 2006	Kitt Peak	Spacewatch	·	2.0 km	MPC · JPL
340359	2006 DG_{95}	—	February 24, 2006	Kitt Peak	Spacewatch	H	680 m	MPC · JPL
340360	2006 DF_{98}	—	February 25, 2006	Kitt Peak	Spacewatch	L5	15 km	MPC · JPL
340361	2006 DX_{106}	—	February 25, 2006	Kitt Peak	Spacewatch	·	1.0 km	MPC · JPL
340362	2006 DE_{109}	—	February 25, 2006	Kitt Peak	Spacewatch	KON	3.0 km	MPC · JPL
340363	2006 DF_{116}	—	February 27, 2006	Kitt Peak	Spacewatch	·	2.4 km	MPC · JPL
340364	2006 DS_{124}	—	February 24, 2006	Mount Lemmon	Mount Lemmon Survey	·	1.6 km	MPC · JPL
340365	2006 DY_{124}	—	February 24, 2006	Palomar	NEAT	·	3.4 km	MPC · JPL
340366	2006 DC_{126}	—	March 21, 2002	Kitt Peak	Spacewatch	·	1.5 km	MPC · JPL
340367	2006 DF_{129}	—	February 25, 2006	Kitt Peak	Spacewatch	(5)	1.4 km	MPC · JPL
340368	2006 DC_{135}	—	February 25, 2006	Mount Lemmon	Mount Lemmon Survey	·	1.8 km	MPC · JPL
340369	2006 DV_{140}	—	February 25, 2006	Kitt Peak	Spacewatch	·	1.8 km	MPC · JPL
340370	2006 DN_{143}	—	February 25, 2006	Mount Lemmon	Mount Lemmon Survey	·	1.7 km	MPC · JPL
340371	2006 DT_{152}	—	February 25, 2006	Kitt Peak	Spacewatch	MIS	2.5 km	MPC · JPL
340372	2006 DQ_{161}	—	February 27, 2006	Kitt Peak	Spacewatch	·	1.3 km	MPC · JPL
340373	2006 DR_{168}	—	February 27, 2006	Kitt Peak	Spacewatch	·	1.9 km	MPC · JPL
340374	2006 DZ_{181}	—	February 27, 2006	Kitt Peak	Spacewatch	·	2.0 km	MPC · JPL
340375	2006 DL_{185}	—	February 27, 2006	Kitt Peak	Spacewatch	·	2.2 km	MPC · JPL
340376	2006 DV_{187}	—	February 27, 2006	Kitt Peak	Spacewatch	MAS	720 m	MPC · JPL
340377	2006 DE_{189}	—	February 27, 2006	Kitt Peak	Spacewatch	·	1.5 km	MPC · JPL
340378	2006 DT_{189}	—	February 27, 2006	Kitt Peak	Spacewatch	·	2.4 km	MPC · JPL
340379	2006 DR_{190}	—	February 27, 2006	Kitt Peak	Spacewatch	WIT	1.4 km	MPC · JPL
340380	2006 DW_{192}	—	February 27, 2006	Kitt Peak	Spacewatch	·	1.3 km	MPC · JPL
340381	2006 DU_{197}	—	February 24, 2006	Palomar	NEAT	EUN	1.8 km	MPC · JPL
340382	2006 DV_{197}	—	February 24, 2006	Palomar	NEAT	JUN	1.7 km	MPC · JPL
340383	2006 DX_{203}	—	February 24, 2006	Palomar	NEAT	·	4.0 km	MPC · JPL
340384	2006 DL_{207}	—	February 25, 2006	Kitt Peak	Spacewatch	·	1.6 km	MPC · JPL
340385	2006 DB_{209}	—	February 27, 2006	Mount Lemmon	Mount Lemmon Survey	·	2.5 km	MPC · JPL
340386	2006 EU_{1}	—	March 3, 2006	Mount Nyukasa	Japan Aerospace Exploration Agency	·	1.8 km	MPC · JPL
340387	2006 ES_{4}	—	March 2, 2006	Kitt Peak	Spacewatch	·	1.2 km	MPC · JPL
340388	2006 EK_{13}	—	March 2, 2006	Kitt Peak	Spacewatch	MAS	660 m	MPC · JPL
340389	2006 EQ_{14}	—	March 2, 2006	Kitt Peak	Spacewatch	·	1.3 km	MPC · JPL
340390	2006 EF_{15}	—	March 2, 2006	Kitt Peak	Spacewatch	·	1.6 km	MPC · JPL
340391	2006 ER_{15}	—	March 2, 2006	Kitt Peak	Spacewatch	(5)	1.5 km	MPC · JPL
340392	2006 EC_{17}	—	March 2, 2006	Mount Lemmon	Mount Lemmon Survey	·	2.0 km	MPC · JPL
340393	2006 EF_{17}	—	March 2, 2006	Kitt Peak	Spacewatch	AEO	1.2 km	MPC · JPL
340394	2006 EH_{27}	—	March 3, 2006	Mount Lemmon	Mount Lemmon Survey	EUN	1.5 km	MPC · JPL
340395	2006 EJ_{27}	—	March 3, 2006	Kitt Peak	Spacewatch	·	1.3 km	MPC · JPL
340396	2006 EU_{29}	—	March 3, 2006	Kitt Peak	Spacewatch	L5	11 km	MPC · JPL
340397	2006 EK_{32}	—	March 3, 2006	Mount Lemmon	Mount Lemmon Survey	·	1.5 km	MPC · JPL
340398	2006 EJ_{33}	—	March 3, 2006	Mount Lemmon	Mount Lemmon Survey	·	1.4 km	MPC · JPL
340399	2006 EX_{34}	—	March 3, 2006	Kitt Peak	Spacewatch	·	1.5 km	MPC · JPL
340400	2006 EM_{35}	—	March 3, 2006	Kitt Peak	Spacewatch	·	1.6 km	MPC · JPL

== 340401–340500 ==
back to top

Designation			Discovery			Properties		Ref
Permanent	Provisional	Named after	Date	Site	Discoverer(s)	Category	Diam.	Ref
340401	2006 EU_{35}	—	March 3, 2006	Mount Lemmon	Mount Lemmon Survey	·	1.4 km	MPC · JPL
340402	2006 EV_{48}	—	March 4, 2006	Kitt Peak	Spacewatch	·	2.2 km	MPC · JPL
340403	2006 EQ_{54}	—	March 5, 2006	Kitt Peak	Spacewatch	·	1.1 km	MPC · JPL
340404	2006 EL_{62}	—	March 5, 2006	Kitt Peak	Spacewatch	·	3.2 km	MPC · JPL
340405	2006 EM_{63}	—	March 5, 2006	Kitt Peak	Spacewatch	MRX	1.1 km	MPC · JPL
340406	2006 ED_{65}	—	March 5, 2006	Kitt Peak	Spacewatch	(194)	1.6 km	MPC · JPL
340407	2006 EZ_{65}	—	March 5, 2006	Kitt Peak	Spacewatch	·	1.7 km	MPC · JPL
340408	2006 EJ_{66}	—	March 5, 2006	Kitt Peak	Spacewatch	H	600 m	MPC · JPL
340409	2006 ES_{72}	—	March 6, 2006	Kitt Peak	Spacewatch	EOS	2.0 km	MPC · JPL
340410	2006 EV_{72}	—	March 2, 2006	Mount Lemmon	Mount Lemmon Survey	·	1.9 km	MPC · JPL
340411	2006 FC_{1}	—	March 21, 2006	Mount Lemmon	Mount Lemmon Survey	·	1.2 km	MPC · JPL
340412	2006 FY_{8}	—	March 23, 2006	Kitt Peak	Spacewatch	·	1.7 km	MPC · JPL
340413	2006 FS_{9}	—	March 23, 2006	Calvin-Rehoboth	Calvin College	·	1.2 km	MPC · JPL
340414	2006 FC_{10}	—	March 26, 2006	Reedy Creek	J. Broughton	·	2.4 km	MPC · JPL
340415	2006 FD_{10}	—	March 26, 2006	Reedy Creek	J. Broughton	·	2.0 km	MPC · JPL
340416	2006 FZ_{12}	—	March 23, 2006	Kitt Peak	Spacewatch	·	2.3 km	MPC · JPL
340417	2006 FE_{13}	—	March 23, 2006	Kitt Peak	Spacewatch	·	1.7 km	MPC · JPL
340418	2006 FA_{14}	—	March 23, 2006	Kitt Peak	Spacewatch	·	2.1 km	MPC · JPL
340419	2006 FM_{16}	—	March 23, 2006	Mount Lemmon	Mount Lemmon Survey	·	1.3 km	MPC · JPL
340420	2006 FO_{17}	—	March 23, 2006	Kitt Peak	Spacewatch	·	1.7 km	MPC · JPL
340421	2006 FY_{18}	—	March 23, 2006	Mount Lemmon	Mount Lemmon Survey	GEF ·	3.8 km	MPC · JPL
340422	2006 FD_{20}	—	March 23, 2006	Mount Lemmon	Mount Lemmon Survey	·	3.1 km	MPC · JPL
340423	2006 FQ_{23}	—	March 24, 2006	Kitt Peak	Spacewatch	·	1.6 km	MPC · JPL
340424	2006 FO_{24}	—	March 24, 2006	Kitt Peak	Spacewatch	·	2.2 km	MPC · JPL
340425	2006 FA_{27}	—	March 24, 2006	Mount Lemmon	Mount Lemmon Survey	AGN	1.2 km	MPC · JPL
340426	2006 FX_{29}	—	March 24, 2006	Mount Lemmon	Mount Lemmon Survey	·	2.2 km	MPC · JPL
340427	2006 FZ_{29}	—	March 24, 2006	Mount Lemmon	Mount Lemmon Survey	·	1.5 km	MPC · JPL
340428	2006 FU_{31}	—	March 25, 2006	Kitt Peak	Spacewatch	·	2.6 km	MPC · JPL
340429	2006 FB_{32}	—	March 25, 2006	Kitt Peak	Spacewatch	(5)	1.8 km	MPC · JPL
340430	2006 FD_{32}	—	March 25, 2006	Kitt Peak	Spacewatch	·	1.8 km	MPC · JPL
340431	2006 FM_{35}	—	March 24, 2006	Socorro	LINEAR	H	700 m	MPC · JPL
340432	2006 FP_{38}	—	March 23, 2006	Kitt Peak	Spacewatch	·	1.5 km	MPC · JPL
340433	2006 FC_{46}	—	March 25, 2006	Palomar	NEAT	·	2.2 km	MPC · JPL
340434	2006 FH_{46}	—	March 26, 2006	Anderson Mesa	LONEOS	·	2.9 km	MPC · JPL
340435	2006 FB_{50}	—	March 31, 2006	Anderson Mesa	LONEOS	·	2.9 km	MPC · JPL
340436	2006 FG_{54}	—	March 25, 2006	Kitt Peak	Spacewatch	·	2.1 km	MPC · JPL
340437	2006 FH_{54}	—	March 23, 2006	Kitt Peak	Spacewatch	EUN	1.4 km	MPC · JPL
340438	2006 GA_{2}	—	April 3, 2006	Great Shefford	Birtwhistle, P.	·	2.0 km	MPC · JPL
340439	2006 GA_{16}	—	April 2, 2006	Kitt Peak	Spacewatch	·	1.7 km	MPC · JPL
340440	2006 GY_{18}	—	April 2, 2006	Kitt Peak	Spacewatch	NEM	2.5 km	MPC · JPL
340441	2006 GU_{21}	—	April 2, 2006	Kitt Peak	Spacewatch	AGN	1.4 km	MPC · JPL
340442	2006 GK_{23}	—	April 2, 2006	Kitt Peak	Spacewatch	·	2.0 km	MPC · JPL
340443	2006 GU_{23}	—	April 2, 2006	Kitt Peak	Spacewatch	·	1.9 km	MPC · JPL
340444	2006 GA_{25}	—	April 2, 2006	Kitt Peak	Spacewatch	NEM	2.2 km	MPC · JPL
340445	2006 GS_{26}	—	April 2, 2006	Kitt Peak	Spacewatch	MRX	1.3 km	MPC · JPL
340446	2006 GR_{32}	—	April 7, 2006	Kitt Peak	Spacewatch	·	1.1 km	MPC · JPL
340447	2006 GX_{34}	—	April 7, 2006	Kitt Peak	Spacewatch	·	1.7 km	MPC · JPL
340448	2006 GA_{36}	—	April 7, 2006	Mount Lemmon	Mount Lemmon Survey	·	2.0 km	MPC · JPL
340449	2006 GE_{39}	—	April 9, 2006	Socorro	LINEAR	H	820 m	MPC · JPL
340450	2006 GX_{39}	—	April 3, 2006	Catalina	CSS	JUN	1.4 km	MPC · JPL
340451	2006 GQ_{40}	—	April 6, 2006	Catalina	CSS	·	2.2 km	MPC · JPL
340452	2006 GS_{42}	—	April 7, 2006	Siding Spring	SSS	·	3.2 km	MPC · JPL
340453	2006 GB_{44}	—	April 2, 2006	Kitt Peak	Spacewatch	·	1.9 km	MPC · JPL
340454	2006 GN_{47}	—	April 9, 2006	Kitt Peak	Spacewatch	·	2.3 km	MPC · JPL
340455	2006 GZ_{47}	—	April 9, 2006	Kitt Peak	Spacewatch	·	1.7 km	MPC · JPL
340456	2006 GK_{52}	—	April 2, 2006	Catalina	CSS	·	2.9 km	MPC · JPL
340457	2006 HY_{1}	—	April 18, 2006	Palomar	NEAT	·	2.9 km	MPC · JPL
340458	2006 HF_{7}	—	April 19, 2006	Anderson Mesa	LONEOS	·	3.8 km	MPC · JPL
340459	2006 HA_{9}	—	April 7, 2006	Mount Lemmon	Mount Lemmon Survey	H	650 m	MPC · JPL
340460	2006 HD_{9}	—	April 19, 2006	Kitt Peak	Spacewatch	·	1.6 km	MPC · JPL
340461	2006 HJ_{15}	—	April 19, 2006	Palomar	NEAT	·	2.0 km	MPC · JPL
340462	2006 HW_{16}	—	April 19, 2006	Mount Lemmon	Mount Lemmon Survey	·	1.8 km	MPC · JPL
340463	2006 HH_{19}	—	April 18, 2006	Kitt Peak	Spacewatch	·	1.9 km	MPC · JPL
340464	2006 HZ_{23}	—	April 20, 2006	Kitt Peak	Spacewatch	·	1.6 km	MPC · JPL
340465	2006 HN_{26}	—	April 20, 2006	Kitt Peak	Spacewatch	·	1.6 km	MPC · JPL
340466	2006 HB_{27}	—	April 20, 2006	Kitt Peak	Spacewatch	H	700 m	MPC · JPL
340467	2006 HO_{29}	—	April 23, 2006	Socorro	LINEAR	H	680 m	MPC · JPL
340468	2006 HU_{29}	—	April 18, 2006	Catalina	CSS	EUN	2.2 km	MPC · JPL
340469	2006 HY_{33}	—	April 19, 2006	Mount Lemmon	Mount Lemmon Survey	EUN	1.3 km	MPC · JPL
340470	2006 HW_{34}	—	April 19, 2006	Mount Lemmon	Mount Lemmon Survey	GEF	1.8 km	MPC · JPL
340471	2006 HK_{36}	—	April 20, 2006	Catalina	CSS	·	2.2 km	MPC · JPL
340472	2006 HP_{43}	—	April 24, 2006	Mount Lemmon	Mount Lemmon Survey	·	2.8 km	MPC · JPL
340473	2006 HB_{46}	—	April 25, 2006	Kitt Peak	Spacewatch	·	3.0 km	MPC · JPL
340474	2006 HB_{47}	—	April 20, 2006	Kitt Peak	Spacewatch	·	1.1 km	MPC · JPL
340475	2006 HY_{47}	—	April 24, 2006	Kitt Peak	Spacewatch	·	1.6 km	MPC · JPL
340476	2006 HZ_{47}	—	April 24, 2006	Kitt Peak	Spacewatch	·	1.9 km	MPC · JPL
340477	2006 HV_{53}	—	April 19, 2006	Catalina	CSS	·	3.1 km	MPC · JPL
340478	2006 HC_{57}	—	April 23, 2006	Socorro	LINEAR	·	1.6 km	MPC · JPL
340479 Broca	2006 HO_{57}	Broca	April 28, 2006	Saint-Sulpice	B. Christophe	MAR	1.6 km	MPC · JPL
340480	2006 HA_{67}	—	April 24, 2006	Kitt Peak	Spacewatch	·	2.0 km	MPC · JPL
340481	2006 HO_{67}	—	April 24, 2006	Mount Lemmon	Mount Lemmon Survey	·	1.6 km	MPC · JPL
340482	2006 HP_{67}	—	April 24, 2006	Mount Lemmon	Mount Lemmon Survey	·	1.8 km	MPC · JPL
340483	2006 HW_{73}	—	April 25, 2006	Kitt Peak	Spacewatch	AGN	1.2 km	MPC · JPL
340484	2006 HG_{77}	—	April 25, 2006	Kitt Peak	Spacewatch	·	2.6 km	MPC · JPL
340485	2006 HN_{78}	—	April 26, 2006	Mount Lemmon	Mount Lemmon Survey	·	2.1 km	MPC · JPL
340486	2006 HM_{79}	—	April 26, 2006	Kitt Peak	Spacewatch	·	2.4 km	MPC · JPL
340487	2006 HV_{81}	—	April 26, 2006	Kitt Peak	Spacewatch	·	2.5 km	MPC · JPL
340488	2006 HQ_{84}	—	April 26, 2006	Kitt Peak	Spacewatch	·	2.3 km	MPC · JPL
340489	2006 HV_{85}	—	April 27, 2006	Kitt Peak	Spacewatch	·	2.3 km	MPC · JPL
340490	2006 HD_{87}	—	April 30, 2006	Kitt Peak	Spacewatch	·	1.9 km	MPC · JPL
340491	2006 HC_{91}	—	April 29, 2006	Kitt Peak	Spacewatch	·	2.1 km	MPC · JPL
340492	2006 HP_{96}	—	April 30, 2006	Kitt Peak	Spacewatch	·	2.1 km	MPC · JPL
340493	2006 HU_{96}	—	April 30, 2006	Kitt Peak	Spacewatch	·	2.8 km	MPC · JPL
340494	2006 HE_{97}	—	April 30, 2006	Kitt Peak	Spacewatch	·	1.6 km	MPC · JPL
340495	2006 HS_{99}	—	April 30, 2006	Kitt Peak	Spacewatch	·	2.5 km	MPC · JPL
340496	2006 HG_{101}	—	April 30, 2006	Kitt Peak	Spacewatch	PAD	2.0 km	MPC · JPL
340497	2006 HT_{106}	—	April 30, 2006	Kitt Peak	Spacewatch	·	1.7 km	MPC · JPL
340498	2006 HG_{116}	—	April 26, 2006	Kitt Peak	Spacewatch	·	2.5 km	MPC · JPL
340499	2006 HH_{116}	—	April 26, 2006	Kitt Peak	Spacewatch	·	2.3 km	MPC · JPL
340500	2006 HB_{117}	—	April 26, 2006	Kitt Peak	Spacewatch	·	3.0 km	MPC · JPL

== 340501–340600 ==
back to top

Designation			Discovery			Properties		Ref
Permanent	Provisional	Named after	Date	Site	Discoverer(s)	Category	Diam.	Ref
340501	2006 HT_{118}	—	April 30, 2006	Kitt Peak	Spacewatch	·	2.0 km	MPC · JPL
340502	2006 HW_{120}	—	April 30, 2006	Kitt Peak	Spacewatch	·	2.0 km	MPC · JPL
340503	2006 HC_{151}	—	April 26, 2006	Kitt Peak	Spacewatch	·	1.6 km	MPC · JPL
340504	2006 HZ_{152}	—	April 26, 2006	Kitt Peak	Spacewatch	·	1.7 km	MPC · JPL
340505	2006 HG_{153}	—	April 20, 2006	Kitt Peak	Spacewatch	·	1.8 km	MPC · JPL
340506	2006 HL_{153}	—	April 20, 2006	Kitt Peak	Spacewatch	·	1.5 km	MPC · JPL
340507	2006 JT_{6}	—	May 1, 2006	Kitt Peak	Spacewatch	AGN	1.4 km	MPC · JPL
340508	2006 JJ_{7}	—	May 1, 2006	Kitt Peak	Spacewatch	EUN	1.8 km	MPC · JPL
340509	2006 JT_{8}	—	May 1, 2006	Kitt Peak	Spacewatch	·	1.9 km	MPC · JPL
340510	2006 JB_{12}	—	May 1, 2006	Kitt Peak	Spacewatch	·	2.8 km	MPC · JPL
340511	2006 JO_{13}	—	May 1, 2006	Kitt Peak	Spacewatch	·	1.6 km	MPC · JPL
340512	2006 JT_{13}	—	May 3, 2006	Kitt Peak	Spacewatch	GEF	1.8 km	MPC · JPL
340513	2006 JC_{15}	—	May 2, 2006	Mount Lemmon	Mount Lemmon Survey	MIS	3.7 km	MPC · JPL
340514	2006 JG_{19}	—	May 2, 2006	Mount Lemmon	Mount Lemmon Survey	·	2.4 km	MPC · JPL
340515	2006 JA_{20}	—	May 2, 2006	Kitt Peak	Spacewatch	·	1.7 km	MPC · JPL
340516	2006 JT_{21}	—	May 2, 2006	Kitt Peak	Spacewatch	ADE	2.6 km	MPC · JPL
340517	2006 JH_{23}	—	May 3, 2006	Mount Lemmon	Mount Lemmon Survey	·	1.4 km	MPC · JPL
340518	2006 JU_{25}	—	February 6, 2006	Kitt Peak	Spacewatch	H	660 m	MPC · JPL
340519	2006 JC_{26}	—	May 3, 2006	Reedy Creek	J. Broughton	GEF	1.9 km	MPC · JPL
340520	2006 JY_{27}	—	May 2, 2006	Mount Lemmon	Mount Lemmon Survey	AGN	1.2 km	MPC · JPL
340521	2006 JO_{31}	—	May 3, 2006	Kitt Peak	Spacewatch	HNS	1.0 km	MPC · JPL
340522	2006 JO_{33}	—	May 4, 2006	Kitt Peak	Spacewatch	·	2.6 km	MPC · JPL
340523	2006 JV_{33}	—	May 4, 2006	Mount Lemmon	Mount Lemmon Survey	NEM	2.3 km	MPC · JPL
340524	2006 JL_{34}	—	May 4, 2006	Kitt Peak	Spacewatch	·	2.0 km	MPC · JPL
340525	2006 JO_{35}	—	May 4, 2006	Kitt Peak	Spacewatch	·	3.1 km	MPC · JPL
340526	2006 JD_{37}	—	May 5, 2006	Kitt Peak	Spacewatch	·	1.5 km	MPC · JPL
340527	2006 JN_{37}	—	May 5, 2006	Kitt Peak	Spacewatch	·	2.6 km	MPC · JPL
340528	2006 JV_{37}	—	May 5, 2006	Kitt Peak	Spacewatch	·	1.7 km	MPC · JPL
340529	2006 JU_{38}	—	May 6, 2006	Mount Lemmon	Mount Lemmon Survey	(5)	1.3 km	MPC · JPL
340530	2006 JR_{48}	—	May 8, 2006	Siding Spring	SSS	·	2.1 km	MPC · JPL
340531	2006 JZ_{49}	—	May 2, 2006	Mount Lemmon	Mount Lemmon Survey	·	1.6 km	MPC · JPL
340532	2006 JS_{50}	—	May 2, 2006	Mount Lemmon	Mount Lemmon Survey	·	2.7 km	MPC · JPL
340533	2006 JM_{51}	—	May 2, 2006	Kitt Peak	Spacewatch	ADE	2.2 km	MPC · JPL
340534	2006 JY_{51}	—	May 3, 2006	Kitt Peak	Spacewatch	·	1.4 km	MPC · JPL
340535	2006 JX_{53}	—	May 7, 2006	Mount Lemmon	Mount Lemmon Survey	·	2.1 km	MPC · JPL
340536	2006 JA_{54}	—	May 7, 2006	Mount Lemmon	Mount Lemmon Survey	·	2.2 km	MPC · JPL
340537	2006 JX_{54}	—	May 8, 2006	Siding Spring	SSS	·	4.3 km	MPC · JPL
340538	2006 JJ_{73}	—	May 1, 2006	Mauna Kea	P. A. Wiegert	·	2.1 km	MPC · JPL
340539	2006 JR_{81}	—	May 7, 2006	Mount Lemmon	Mount Lemmon Survey	·	2.0 km	MPC · JPL
340540	2006 KL_{4}	—	May 19, 2006	Mount Lemmon	Mount Lemmon Survey	·	2.2 km	MPC · JPL
340541	2006 KS_{4}	—	May 19, 2006	Mount Lemmon	Mount Lemmon Survey	·	2.1 km	MPC · JPL
340542	2006 KB_{8}	—	May 19, 2006	Mount Lemmon	Mount Lemmon Survey	PAD	2.9 km	MPC · JPL
340543	2006 KJ_{14}	—	May 20, 2006	Catalina	CSS	·	1.6 km	MPC · JPL
340544	2006 KJ_{16}	—	May 20, 2006	Palomar	NEAT	H	780 m	MPC · JPL
340545	2006 KB_{18}	—	May 21, 2006	Kitt Peak	Spacewatch	ADE	3.4 km	MPC · JPL
340546	2006 KN_{22}	—	May 20, 2006	Catalina	CSS	·	3.7 km	MPC · JPL
340547	2006 KM_{28}	—	May 20, 2006	Kitt Peak	Spacewatch	·	2.2 km	MPC · JPL
340548	2006 KW_{31}	—	May 20, 2006	Kitt Peak	Spacewatch	·	1.5 km	MPC · JPL
340549	2006 KU_{34}	—	May 20, 2006	Kitt Peak	Spacewatch	·	1.2 km	MPC · JPL
340550	2006 KL_{35}	—	May 20, 2006	Kitt Peak	Spacewatch	·	1.5 km	MPC · JPL
340551	2006 KU_{44}	—	May 21, 2006	Kitt Peak	Spacewatch	·	2.4 km	MPC · JPL
340552	2006 KL_{48}	—	May 21, 2006	Kitt Peak	Spacewatch	MRX	1.3 km	MPC · JPL
340553	2006 KP_{48}	—	April 26, 2006	Kitt Peak	Spacewatch	·	2.3 km	MPC · JPL
340554	2006 KC_{50}	—	May 6, 2006	Mount Lemmon	Mount Lemmon Survey	·	2.0 km	MPC · JPL
340555	2006 KO_{54}	—	May 21, 2006	Kitt Peak	Spacewatch	·	2.0 km	MPC · JPL
340556	2006 KH_{63}	—	May 23, 2006	Mount Lemmon	Mount Lemmon Survey	·	2.5 km	MPC · JPL
340557	2006 KH_{64}	—	May 23, 2006	Kitt Peak	Spacewatch	·	1.8 km	MPC · JPL
340558	2006 KA_{66}	—	May 24, 2006	Mount Lemmon	Mount Lemmon Survey	·	1.5 km	MPC · JPL
340559	2006 KN_{66}	—	May 24, 2006	Mount Lemmon	Mount Lemmon Survey	·	2.0 km	MPC · JPL
340560	2006 KY_{76}	—	May 24, 2006	Mount Lemmon	Mount Lemmon Survey	·	1.8 km	MPC · JPL
340561	2006 KR_{78}	—	May 24, 2006	Mount Lemmon	Mount Lemmon Survey	·	1.8 km	MPC · JPL
340562	2006 KC_{81}	—	May 25, 2006	Mount Lemmon	Mount Lemmon Survey	·	3.0 km	MPC · JPL
340563	2006 KH_{92}	—	May 25, 2006	Kitt Peak	Spacewatch	·	2.1 km	MPC · JPL
340564	2006 KH_{95}	—	May 25, 2006	Mount Lemmon	Mount Lemmon Survey	GEF	1.6 km	MPC · JPL
340565	2006 KS_{96}	—	May 25, 2006	Kitt Peak	Spacewatch	·	4.3 km	MPC · JPL
340566	2006 KB_{100}	—	May 29, 2006	Siding Spring	SSS	(18466)	3.1 km	MPC · JPL
340567	2006 KA_{105}	—	May 28, 2006	Kitt Peak	Spacewatch	·	1.8 km	MPC · JPL
340568	2006 KS_{108}	—	May 31, 2006	Mount Lemmon	Mount Lemmon Survey	·	1.7 km	MPC · JPL
340569	2006 KK_{115}	—	May 29, 2006	Kitt Peak	Spacewatch	·	2.1 km	MPC · JPL
340570	2006 KY_{115}	—	May 29, 2006	Kitt Peak	Spacewatch	EUN	1.9 km	MPC · JPL
340571	2006 KG_{123}	—	May 24, 2006	Mount Lemmon	Mount Lemmon Survey	·	2.4 km	MPC · JPL
340572	2006 KM_{123}	—	May 25, 2006	Kitt Peak	Spacewatch	·	3.8 km	MPC · JPL
340573	2006 MF_{3}	—	June 19, 2006	Kitt Peak	Spacewatch	HNS	1.8 km	MPC · JPL
340574	2006 MG_{12}	—	June 21, 2006	Lulin	Q. Ye	·	3.0 km	MPC · JPL
340575	2006 MO_{14}	—	June 29, 2006	Hibiscus	S. F. Hönig	·	4.2 km	MPC · JPL
340576	2006 OO_{3}	—	July 21, 2006	Palomar	NEAT	·	3.8 km	MPC · JPL
340577	2006 OY_{5}	—	July 18, 2006	Siding Spring	SSS	·	3.7 km	MPC · JPL
340578	2006 OB_{12}	—	July 21, 2006	Catalina	CSS	·	5.5 km	MPC · JPL
340579 Losse	2006 PY	Losse	August 6, 2006	Dax	C. Rinner	TIR	4.2 km	MPC · JPL
340580	2006 PS_{3}	—	August 12, 2006	Palomar	NEAT	·	6.5 km	MPC · JPL
340581	2006 PL_{5}	—	August 12, 2006	Palomar	NEAT	LIX	4.6 km	MPC · JPL
340582	2006 PD_{7}	—	August 12, 2006	Palomar	NEAT	EOS	2.6 km	MPC · JPL
340583	2006 PG_{9}	—	August 13, 2006	Palomar	NEAT	EOS	2.4 km	MPC · JPL
340584	2006 PP_{10}	—	August 13, 2006	Palomar	NEAT	·	3.5 km	MPC · JPL
340585	2006 PH_{17}	—	August 15, 2006	Palomar	NEAT	TIR	4.1 km	MPC · JPL
340586	2006 PL_{20}	—	August 14, 2006	Siding Spring	SSS	·	5.1 km	MPC · JPL
340587	2006 PW_{21}	—	August 15, 2006	Palomar	NEAT	·	3.5 km	MPC · JPL
340588	2006 PJ_{23}	—	August 12, 2006	Palomar	NEAT	·	3.2 km	MPC · JPL
340589	2006 PB_{29}	—	August 10, 2006	Palomar	NEAT	TIR	5.1 km	MPC · JPL
340590	2006 PT_{32}	—	August 15, 2006	Siding Spring	SSS	TIR	4.2 km	MPC · JPL
340591	2006 PZ_{36}	—	August 12, 2006	Palomar	NEAT	·	4.5 km	MPC · JPL
340592	2006 PA_{38}	—	August 13, 2006	Palomar	NEAT	·	3.8 km	MPC · JPL
340593	2006 PQ_{39}	—	August 14, 2006	Palomar	NEAT	·	3.8 km	MPC · JPL
340594	2006 QH_{1}	—	August 16, 2006	Siding Spring	SSS	·	4.0 km	MPC · JPL
340595	2006 QB_{2}	—	August 17, 2006	Palomar	NEAT	HYG	3.5 km	MPC · JPL
340596	2006 QE_{17}	—	August 17, 2006	Palomar	NEAT	EOS	2.5 km	MPC · JPL
340597	2006 QN_{21}	—	August 19, 2006	Anderson Mesa	LONEOS	·	3.5 km	MPC · JPL
340598	2006 QG_{22}	—	August 19, 2006	Anderson Mesa	LONEOS	·	4.0 km	MPC · JPL
340599	2006 QF_{32}	—	August 19, 2006	Palomar	NEAT	·	4.9 km	MPC · JPL
340600	2006 QW_{32}	—	July 21, 2006	Catalina	CSS	THB	3.2 km	MPC · JPL

== 340601–340700 ==
back to top

Designation			Discovery			Properties		Ref
Permanent	Provisional	Named after	Date	Site	Discoverer(s)	Category	Diam.	Ref
340601	2006 QQ_{39}	—	August 20, 2006	Siding Spring	SSS	T_{j} (2.98) · EUP	5.1 km	MPC · JPL
340602	2006 QX_{43}	—	August 19, 2006	Kitt Peak	Spacewatch	·	2.8 km	MPC · JPL
340603	2006 QG_{44}	—	August 19, 2006	Palomar	NEAT	LIX	4.7 km	MPC · JPL
340604	2006 QW_{44}	—	August 19, 2006	Kitt Peak	Spacewatch	·	3.5 km	MPC · JPL
340605	2006 QN_{48}	—	August 21, 2006	Socorro	LINEAR	·	4.8 km	MPC · JPL
340606	2006 QG_{52}	—	August 23, 2006	Palomar	NEAT	·	2.7 km	MPC · JPL
340607	2006 QK_{54}	—	August 17, 2006	Palomar	NEAT	·	3.5 km	MPC · JPL
340608	2006 QA_{55}	—	August 19, 2006	Anderson Mesa	LONEOS	·	4.6 km	MPC · JPL
340609	2006 QC_{55}	—	August 19, 2006	Anderson Mesa	LONEOS	TIR ·	5.7 km	MPC · JPL
340610	2006 QL_{59}	—	August 19, 2006	Anderson Mesa	LONEOS	·	3.8 km	MPC · JPL
340611	2006 QS_{61}	—	August 22, 2006	Palomar	NEAT	·	4.5 km	MPC · JPL
340612	2006 QN_{63}	—	August 24, 2006	Palomar	NEAT	EOS	2.4 km	MPC · JPL
340613	2006 QO_{65}	—	August 27, 2006	Kitt Peak	Spacewatch	·	3.4 km	MPC · JPL
340614	2006 QN_{66}	—	August 21, 2006	Socorro	LINEAR	·	4.8 km	MPC · JPL
340615	2006 QO_{71}	—	August 21, 2006	Kitt Peak	Spacewatch	THM	2.6 km	MPC · JPL
340616	2006 QL_{88}	—	August 27, 2006	Kitt Peak	Spacewatch	·	4.0 km	MPC · JPL
340617	2006 QH_{93}	—	August 16, 2006	Palomar	NEAT	EOS	2.3 km	MPC · JPL
340618	2006 QR_{98}	—	August 22, 2006	Palomar	NEAT	·	4.8 km	MPC · JPL
340619	2006 QR_{99}	—	August 24, 2006	Palomar	NEAT	EUP	6.8 km	MPC · JPL
340620	2006 QW_{102}	—	August 27, 2006	Kitt Peak	Spacewatch	·	3.3 km	MPC · JPL
340621	2006 QW_{106}	—	August 28, 2006	Catalina	CSS	·	4.1 km	MPC · JPL
340622	2006 QN_{114}	—	August 27, 2006	Anderson Mesa	LONEOS	·	3.6 km	MPC · JPL
340623	2006 QF_{115}	—	August 27, 2006	Anderson Mesa	LONEOS	·	4.0 km	MPC · JPL
340624	2006 QT_{118}	—	August 27, 2006	Anderson Mesa	LONEOS	LUT	8.1 km	MPC · JPL
340625	2006 QL_{120}	—	August 29, 2006	Catalina	CSS	·	4.4 km	MPC · JPL
340626	2006 QT_{121}	—	August 29, 2006	Catalina	CSS	·	4.2 km	MPC · JPL
340627	2006 QP_{122}	—	August 29, 2006	Catalina	CSS	TIR	3.8 km	MPC · JPL
340628	2006 QV_{124}	—	August 16, 2006	Palomar	NEAT	·	2.8 km	MPC · JPL
340629	2006 QB_{125}	—	August 16, 2006	Palomar	NEAT	·	3.7 km	MPC · JPL
340630	2006 QG_{125}	—	August 16, 2006	Palomar	NEAT	EUP	5.9 km	MPC · JPL
340631	2006 QG_{128}	—	August 17, 2006	Palomar	NEAT	·	3.0 km	MPC · JPL
340632	2006 QG_{129}	—	August 17, 2006	Palomar	NEAT	TIR	4.3 km	MPC · JPL
340633	2006 QL_{134}	—	August 25, 2006	Socorro	LINEAR	·	4.2 km	MPC · JPL
340634	2006 QU_{134}	—	August 27, 2006	Anderson Mesa	LONEOS	·	3.4 km	MPC · JPL
340635	2006 QU_{139}	—	August 17, 2006	Palomar	NEAT	·	5.2 km	MPC · JPL
340636	2006 QC_{148}	—	August 18, 2006	Kitt Peak	Spacewatch	·	3.8 km	MPC · JPL
340637	2006 QB_{155}	—	August 18, 2006	Palomar	NEAT	·	3.4 km	MPC · JPL
340638	2006 QG_{155}	—	August 18, 2006	Palomar	NEAT	·	2.8 km	MPC · JPL
340639	2006 QC_{158}	—	August 19, 2006	Kitt Peak	Spacewatch	·	3.3 km	MPC · JPL
340640	2006 QS_{158}	—	August 19, 2006	Kitt Peak	Spacewatch	·	3.8 km	MPC · JPL
340641	2006 QO_{159}	—	August 19, 2006	Kitt Peak	Spacewatch	·	2.6 km	MPC · JPL
340642	2006 QX_{162}	—	August 21, 2006	Kitt Peak	Spacewatch	LIX	5.2 km	MPC · JPL
340643	2006 QZ_{163}	—	August 29, 2006	Catalina	CSS	·	3.5 km	MPC · JPL
340644	2006 QV_{166}	—	August 29, 2006	Catalina	CSS	·	3.2 km	MPC · JPL
340645	2006 QX_{167}	—	August 30, 2006	Anderson Mesa	LONEOS	·	5.1 km	MPC · JPL
340646	2006 QH_{169}	—	August 31, 2006	Socorro	LINEAR	T_{j} (2.98)	5.5 km	MPC · JPL
340647	2006 QK_{173}	—	August 22, 2006	Cerro Tololo	M. W. Buie	·	2.3 km	MPC · JPL
340648	2006 QF_{183}	—	August 21, 2006	Kitt Peak	Spacewatch	·	3.3 km	MPC · JPL
340649	2006 QK_{183}	—	August 28, 2006	Kitt Peak	Spacewatch	·	2.7 km	MPC · JPL
340650	2006 QQ_{185}	—	August 19, 2006	Kitt Peak	Spacewatch	·	4.7 km	MPC · JPL
340651	2006 RQ_{1}	—	September 12, 2006	Mayhill	Lowe, A.	·	4.2 km	MPC · JPL
340652	2006 RD_{5}	—	September 14, 2006	Catalina	CSS	·	5.9 km	MPC · JPL
340653	2006 RM_{7}	—	September 11, 2006	Catalina	CSS	·	5.0 km	MPC · JPL
340654	2006 RZ_{11}	—	September 13, 2006	Palomar	NEAT	THM	2.8 km	MPC · JPL
340655	2006 RC_{12}	—	September 13, 2006	Palomar	NEAT	TIR	4.2 km	MPC · JPL
340656	2006 RE_{13}	—	September 14, 2006	Kitt Peak	Spacewatch	·	2.6 km	MPC · JPL
340657	2006 RW_{15}	—	September 14, 2006	Catalina	CSS	·	6.5 km	MPC · JPL
340658	2006 RA_{17}	—	September 14, 2006	Palomar	NEAT	EUP	4.5 km	MPC · JPL
340659	2006 RF_{17}	—	September 14, 2006	Catalina	CSS	·	3.4 km	MPC · JPL
340660	2006 RR_{25}	—	September 14, 2006	Kitt Peak	Spacewatch	VER	2.4 km	MPC · JPL
340661	2006 RW_{26}	—	September 14, 2006	Palomar	NEAT	·	5.1 km	MPC · JPL
340662	2006 RT_{28}	—	September 15, 2006	Kitt Peak	Spacewatch	·	2.5 km	MPC · JPL
340663	2006 RO_{29}	—	September 15, 2006	Kitt Peak	Spacewatch	·	3.3 km	MPC · JPL
340664	2006 RD_{30}	—	September 15, 2006	Kitt Peak	Spacewatch	·	2.7 km	MPC · JPL
340665	2006 RA_{35}	—	September 14, 2006	Palomar	NEAT	·	3.6 km	MPC · JPL
340666	2006 RO_{36}	—	September 15, 2006	Socorro	LINEAR	ATE +1km	980 m	MPC · JPL
340667	2006 RX_{36}	—	September 12, 2006	Catalina	CSS	·	4.5 km	MPC · JPL
340668	2006 RE_{37}	—	September 12, 2006	Catalina	CSS	·	3.7 km	MPC · JPL
340669	2006 RD_{39}	—	September 14, 2006	Catalina	CSS	·	4.6 km	MPC · JPL
340670	2006 RH_{39}	—	September 14, 2006	Catalina	CSS	·	3.7 km	MPC · JPL
340671	2006 RZ_{41}	—	September 14, 2006	Kitt Peak	Spacewatch	·	2.9 km	MPC · JPL
340672	2006 RJ_{42}	—	September 14, 2006	Kitt Peak	Spacewatch	HYG	3.3 km	MPC · JPL
340673	2006 RV_{42}	—	September 14, 2006	Kitt Peak	Spacewatch	·	3.6 km	MPC · JPL
340674	2006 RG_{43}	—	September 14, 2006	Kitt Peak	Spacewatch	·	3.2 km	MPC · JPL
340675	2006 RQ_{54}	—	September 14, 2006	Kitt Peak	Spacewatch	·	5.6 km	MPC · JPL
340676	2006 RY_{57}	—	September 15, 2006	Kitt Peak	Spacewatch	·	3.3 km	MPC · JPL
340677	2006 RD_{65}	—	September 14, 2006	Palomar	NEAT	·	3.1 km	MPC · JPL
340678	2006 RH_{67}	—	September 15, 2006	Kitt Peak	Spacewatch	·	2.8 km	MPC · JPL
340679	2006 RM_{69}	—	September 15, 2006	Kitt Peak	Spacewatch	·	3.4 km	MPC · JPL
340680	2006 RW_{77}	—	September 15, 2006	Kitt Peak	Spacewatch	·	3.4 km	MPC · JPL
340681	2006 RN_{78}	—	September 15, 2006	Kitt Peak	Spacewatch	·	4.1 km	MPC · JPL
340682	2006 RM_{81}	—	September 15, 2006	Kitt Peak	Spacewatch	·	3.1 km	MPC · JPL
340683	2006 RS_{83}	—	September 15, 2006	Kitt Peak	Spacewatch	NYS	980 m	MPC · JPL
340684	2006 RE_{94}	—	September 15, 2006	Kitt Peak	Spacewatch	·	4.0 km	MPC · JPL
340685	2006 RD_{100}	—	September 14, 2006	Catalina	CSS	VER	3.6 km	MPC · JPL
340686	2006 RX_{101}	—	September 14, 2006	Palomar	NEAT	T_{j} (2.97)	5.9 km	MPC · JPL
340687 Gerrysmith	2006 RA_{108}	Gerrysmith	September 14, 2006	Mauna Kea	Masiero, J.	LIX	5.2 km	MPC · JPL
340688	2006 RY_{120}	—	September 15, 2006	Kitt Peak	Spacewatch	·	3.3 km	MPC · JPL
340689	2006 RY_{121}	—	September 15, 2006	Kitt Peak	Spacewatch	·	3.0 km	MPC · JPL
340690	2006 RH_{122}	—	September 14, 2006	Kitt Peak	Spacewatch	·	2.9 km	MPC · JPL
340691	2006 RT_{122}	—	September 6, 2006	Palomar	NEAT	·	6.3 km	MPC · JPL
340692	2006 SN	—	September 16, 2006	Goodricke-Pigott	R. A. Tucker	·	3.7 km	MPC · JPL
340693	2006 SC_{2}	—	September 16, 2006	Catalina	CSS	·	4.6 km	MPC · JPL
340694	2006 SW_{8}	—	September 17, 2006	Catalina	CSS	·	3.7 km	MPC · JPL
340695	2006 SL_{9}	—	August 30, 2006	Anderson Mesa	LONEOS	·	3.7 km	MPC · JPL
340696	2006 SM_{11}	—	September 16, 2006	Anderson Mesa	LONEOS	·	4.1 km	MPC · JPL
340697	2006 SY_{17}	—	September 17, 2006	Kitt Peak	Spacewatch	VER	3.0 km	MPC · JPL
340698	2006 SF_{21}	—	September 16, 2006	Anderson Mesa	LONEOS	VER	3.6 km	MPC · JPL
340699	2006 SM_{21}	—	September 16, 2006	Palomar	NEAT	·	4.1 km	MPC · JPL
340700	2006 SC_{23}	—	September 17, 2006	Anderson Mesa	LONEOS	·	5.2 km	MPC · JPL

== 340701–340800 ==
back to top

Designation			Discovery			Properties		Ref
Permanent	Provisional	Named after	Date	Site	Discoverer(s)	Category	Diam.	Ref
340701	2006 SA_{27}	—	September 16, 2006	Catalina	CSS	·	3.5 km	MPC · JPL
340702	2006 SU_{32}	—	September 17, 2006	Kitt Peak	Spacewatch	·	4.2 km	MPC · JPL
340703	2006 SJ_{33}	—	December 17, 2001	Socorro	LINEAR	·	3.7 km	MPC · JPL
340704	2006 SR_{33}	—	September 17, 2006	Catalina	CSS	·	4.7 km	MPC · JPL
340705	2006 SK_{36}	—	September 17, 2006	Anderson Mesa	LONEOS	·	6.2 km	MPC · JPL
340706	2006 SU_{38}	—	September 18, 2006	Kitt Peak	Spacewatch	·	4.2 km	MPC · JPL
340707	2006 SN_{39}	—	September 18, 2006	Socorro	LINEAR	·	3.8 km	MPC · JPL
340708	2006 SQ_{39}	—	September 18, 2006	Socorro	LINEAR	·	4.6 km	MPC · JPL
340709	2006 SJ_{45}	—	September 18, 2006	Kitt Peak	Spacewatch	EOS	3.1 km	MPC · JPL
340710	2006 SB_{47}	—	September 19, 2006	Catalina	CSS	·	3.5 km	MPC · JPL
340711	2006 SF_{47}	—	September 19, 2006	Catalina	CSS	·	3.3 km	MPC · JPL
340712	2006 ST_{52}	—	September 19, 2006	Anderson Mesa	LONEOS	·	3.6 km	MPC · JPL
340713	2006 SV_{55}	—	September 18, 2006	Catalina	CSS	·	5.2 km	MPC · JPL
340714	2006 SQ_{57}	—	September 20, 2006	Črni Vrh	J. Skvarč, B. Dintinjana	·	3.6 km	MPC · JPL
340715	2006 SE_{58}	—	September 19, 2006	Kitt Peak	Spacewatch	EOS	2.1 km	MPC · JPL
340716	2006 SE_{64}	—	September 18, 2006	Calvin-Rehoboth	Calvin College	·	2.6 km	MPC · JPL
340717	2006 SA_{66}	—	September 19, 2006	Kitt Peak	Spacewatch	·	3.5 km	MPC · JPL
340718	2006 SQ_{68}	—	September 19, 2006	Kitt Peak	Spacewatch	·	4.6 km	MPC · JPL
340719	2006 SH_{70}	—	September 19, 2006	Kitt Peak	Spacewatch	THM	4.1 km	MPC · JPL
340720	2006 SR_{76}	—	September 20, 2006	Kitt Peak	Spacewatch	·	2.3 km	MPC · JPL
340721	2006 SB_{85}	—	September 18, 2006	Kitt Peak	Spacewatch	·	2.9 km	MPC · JPL
340722	2006 SC_{85}	—	September 18, 2006	Kitt Peak	Spacewatch	·	3.8 km	MPC · JPL
340723	2006 SE_{114}	—	September 23, 2006	Kitt Peak	Spacewatch	·	3.2 km	MPC · JPL
340724	2006 SM_{131}	—	September 26, 2006	Cordell-Lorenz	Cordell-Lorenz	·	2.6 km	MPC · JPL
340725	2006 SV_{133}	—	September 17, 2006	Catalina	CSS	VER	3.8 km	MPC · JPL
340726	2006 SH_{137}	—	September 20, 2006	Catalina	CSS	LIX	4.6 km	MPC · JPL
340727	2006 SP_{140}	—	September 22, 2006	Catalina	CSS	·	3.8 km	MPC · JPL
340728	2006 SM_{142}	—	September 19, 2006	Catalina	CSS	·	3.4 km	MPC · JPL
340729	2006 SL_{143}	—	September 19, 2006	Kitt Peak	Spacewatch	CYB	4.3 km	MPC · JPL
340730	2006 SZ_{143}	—	September 19, 2006	Kitt Peak	Spacewatch	·	3.9 km	MPC · JPL
340731	2006 SQ_{155}	—	September 22, 2006	San Marcello	San Marcello	·	4.7 km	MPC · JPL
340732	2006 SK_{163}	—	September 24, 2006	Kitt Peak	Spacewatch	THM	2.7 km	MPC · JPL
340733	2006 SO_{164}	—	September 25, 2006	Kitt Peak	Spacewatch	·	5.1 km	MPC · JPL
340734	2006 SF_{165}	—	September 25, 2006	Kitt Peak	Spacewatch	·	3.3 km	MPC · JPL
340735	2006 SX_{165}	—	September 25, 2006	Kitt Peak	Spacewatch	·	3.3 km	MPC · JPL
340736	2006 SD_{172}	—	September 25, 2006	Kitt Peak	Spacewatch	·	2.6 km	MPC · JPL
340737	2006 SN_{179}	—	September 25, 2006	Kitt Peak	Spacewatch	CYB	3.6 km	MPC · JPL
340738	2006 SJ_{190}	—	September 26, 2006	Mount Lemmon	Mount Lemmon Survey	·	3.5 km	MPC · JPL
340739	2006 SL_{194}	—	September 26, 2006	Kitt Peak	Spacewatch	·	3.6 km	MPC · JPL
340740	2006 SW_{198}	—	September 23, 2006	Siding Spring	SSS	TIR	3.8 km	MPC · JPL
340741	2006 SA_{200}	—	September 24, 2006	Kitt Peak	Spacewatch	HYG	3.0 km	MPC · JPL
340742	2006 SY_{206}	—	September 25, 2006	Mount Lemmon	Mount Lemmon Survey	·	2.8 km	MPC · JPL
340743	2006 SC_{208}	—	September 26, 2006	Kitt Peak	Spacewatch	TIR	2.6 km	MPC · JPL
340744	2006 SS_{210}	—	September 26, 2006	Catalina	CSS	·	5.4 km	MPC · JPL
340745	2006 SC_{215}	—	September 27, 2006	Kitt Peak	Spacewatch	·	4.0 km	MPC · JPL
340746	2006 SO_{232}	—	September 26, 2006	Kitt Peak	Spacewatch	·	2.6 km	MPC · JPL
340747	2006 SE_{241}	—	September 26, 2006	Kitt Peak	Spacewatch	·	3.2 km	MPC · JPL
340748	2006 SL_{243}	—	September 26, 2006	Kitt Peak	Spacewatch	THM	2.3 km	MPC · JPL
340749	2006 SK_{264}	—	September 26, 2006	Kitt Peak	Spacewatch	SYL · CYB	3.9 km	MPC · JPL
340750	2006 SG_{270}	—	August 29, 2006	Catalina	CSS	EOS	2.3 km	MPC · JPL
340751	2006 SB_{276}	—	September 28, 2006	Mount Lemmon	Mount Lemmon Survey	·	3.2 km	MPC · JPL
340752	2006 SC_{276}	—	September 28, 2006	Mount Lemmon	Mount Lemmon Survey	·	2.8 km	MPC · JPL
340753	2006 SY_{282}	—	September 26, 2006	Socorro	LINEAR	EOS	2.5 km	MPC · JPL
340754	2006 SV_{283}	—	September 26, 2006	Catalina	CSS	·	4.1 km	MPC · JPL
340755	2006 SD_{287}	—	September 22, 2006	Anderson Mesa	LONEOS	·	4.5 km	MPC · JPL
340756	2006 ST_{289}	—	September 26, 2006	Catalina	CSS	EUP	5.1 km	MPC · JPL
340757	2006 SQ_{294}	—	September 25, 2006	Kitt Peak	Spacewatch	·	2.9 km	MPC · JPL
340758	2006 SH_{298}	—	September 25, 2006	Mount Lemmon	Mount Lemmon Survey	THM	2.5 km	MPC · JPL
340759	2006 SX_{300}	—	September 26, 2006	Catalina	CSS	·	4.0 km	MPC · JPL
340760	2006 SY_{307}	—	September 27, 2006	Kitt Peak	Spacewatch	URS	4.1 km	MPC · JPL
340761	2006 SL_{310}	—	September 27, 2006	Kitt Peak	Spacewatch	·	4.3 km	MPC · JPL
340762	2006 SJ_{318}	—	September 27, 2006	Kitt Peak	Spacewatch	THB	3.7 km	MPC · JPL
340763	2006 SH_{323}	—	September 27, 2006	Kitt Peak	Spacewatch	·	2.7 km	MPC · JPL
340764	2006 SS_{324}	—	September 27, 2006	Kitt Peak	Spacewatch	·	2.9 km	MPC · JPL
340765	2006 SY_{324}	—	September 27, 2006	Catalina	CSS	T_{j} (2.96)	5.4 km	MPC · JPL
340766	2006 SF_{327}	—	September 27, 2006	Kitt Peak	Spacewatch	·	2.9 km	MPC · JPL
340767	2006 SN_{329}	—	September 27, 2006	Kitt Peak	Spacewatch	·	3.0 km	MPC · JPL
340768	2006 SS_{333}	—	September 28, 2006	Kitt Peak	Spacewatch	·	3.5 km	MPC · JPL
340769	2006 SM_{334}	—	September 28, 2006	Kitt Peak	Spacewatch	·	3.5 km	MPC · JPL
340770	2006 SW_{335}	—	September 28, 2006	Kitt Peak	Spacewatch	·	3.0 km	MPC · JPL
340771	2006 SF_{336}	—	September 28, 2006	Kitt Peak	Spacewatch	·	3.2 km	MPC · JPL
340772	2006 SP_{347}	—	September 28, 2006	Kitt Peak	Spacewatch	·	3.5 km	MPC · JPL
340773	2006 SR_{351}	—	September 30, 2006	Kitt Peak	Spacewatch	·	3.7 km	MPC · JPL
340774	2006 SR_{353}	—	September 30, 2006	Catalina	CSS	·	4.6 km	MPC · JPL
340775	2006 SO_{358}	—	September 30, 2006	Catalina	CSS	VER	3.6 km	MPC · JPL
340776	2006 SG_{366}	—	September 30, 2006	Mount Lemmon	Mount Lemmon Survey	CYB	6.5 km	MPC · JPL
340777	2006 SM_{368}	—	September 27, 2006	Mount Lemmon	Mount Lemmon Survey	·	4.2 km	MPC · JPL
340778	2006 SL_{375}	—	September 17, 2006	Apache Point	A. C. Becker	·	3.1 km	MPC · JPL
340779	2006 SD_{379}	—	September 19, 2006	Apache Point	A. C. Becker	·	3.2 km	MPC · JPL
340780	2006 SA_{380}	—	September 27, 2006	Apache Point	A. C. Becker	·	3.6 km	MPC · JPL
340781	2006 SM_{382}	—	September 28, 2006	Apache Point	A. C. Becker	T_{j} (2.96)	4.8 km	MPC · JPL
340782	2006 SM_{383}	—	September 29, 2006	Apache Point	A. C. Becker	·	3.0 km	MPC · JPL
340783	2006 SV_{383}	—	September 29, 2006	Apache Point	A. C. Becker	·	3.3 km	MPC · JPL
340784	2006 SW_{391}	—	September 19, 2006	Anderson Mesa	LONEOS	·	3.7 km	MPC · JPL
340785	2006 SY_{394}	—	September 28, 2006	Catalina	CSS	·	3.1 km	MPC · JPL
340786	2006 SZ_{394}	—	September 30, 2006	Kitt Peak	Spacewatch	·	2.9 km	MPC · JPL
340787	2006 SN_{395}	—	September 17, 2006	Mauna Kea	Masiero, J.	·	3.7 km	MPC · JPL
340788	2006 SD_{403}	—	September 27, 2006	Kitt Peak	Spacewatch	·	3.3 km	MPC · JPL
340789	2006 SE_{403}	—	September 27, 2006	Mount Lemmon	Mount Lemmon Survey	CYB	4.8 km	MPC · JPL
340790	2006 SJ_{405}	—	September 17, 2006	Kitt Peak	Spacewatch	·	3.7 km	MPC · JPL
340791	2006 TE_{10}	—	September 16, 2006	Catalina	CSS	·	4.1 km	MPC · JPL
340792	2006 TW_{15}	—	October 11, 2006	Kitt Peak	Spacewatch	·	4.3 km	MPC · JPL
340793	2006 TZ_{15}	—	October 11, 2006	Kitt Peak	Spacewatch	·	3.3 km	MPC · JPL
340794	2006 TG_{16}	—	October 11, 2006	Kitt Peak	Spacewatch	·	3.4 km	MPC · JPL
340795	2006 TT_{44}	—	October 12, 2006	Kitt Peak	Spacewatch	·	1.0 km	MPC · JPL
340796	2006 TB_{60}	—	October 13, 2006	Kitt Peak	Spacewatch	CYB	4.2 km	MPC · JPL
340797	2006 TB_{65}	—	October 11, 2006	Kitt Peak	Spacewatch	·	3.4 km	MPC · JPL
340798	2006 TF_{66}	—	October 11, 2006	Palomar	NEAT	·	5.6 km	MPC · JPL
340799	2006 TL_{66}	—	October 11, 2006	Palomar	NEAT	ELF	4.8 km	MPC · JPL
340800	2006 TT_{68}	—	October 11, 2006	Palomar	NEAT	·	3.5 km	MPC · JPL

== 340801–340900 ==
back to top

Designation			Discovery			Properties		Ref
Permanent	Provisional	Named after	Date	Site	Discoverer(s)	Category	Diam.	Ref
340801	2006 TZ_{68}	—	October 11, 2006	Palomar	NEAT	·	4.6 km	MPC · JPL
340802	2006 TD_{70}	—	October 11, 2006	Palomar	NEAT	·	4.9 km	MPC · JPL
340803	2006 TC_{71}	—	October 11, 2006	Palomar	NEAT	·	2.8 km	MPC · JPL
340804	2006 TR_{78}	—	October 12, 2006	Palomar	NEAT	CYB	5.8 km	MPC · JPL
340805	2006 TY_{98}	—	October 15, 2006	Kitt Peak	Spacewatch	LUT	5.9 km	MPC · JPL
340806	2006 TQ_{103}	—	October 15, 2006	Kitt Peak	Spacewatch	SYL · CYB	4.2 km	MPC · JPL
340807	2006 TO_{105}	—	October 15, 2006	Kitt Peak	Spacewatch	HYG	3.3 km	MPC · JPL
340808	2006 TF_{111}	—	October 1, 2006	Apache Point	A. C. Becker	·	4.8 km	MPC · JPL
340809	2006 UA_{3}	—	October 16, 2006	Catalina	CSS	T_{j} (2.98) · 3:2	6.2 km	MPC · JPL
340810	2006 UY_{4}	—	October 16, 2006	Kitt Peak	Spacewatch	·	3.3 km	MPC · JPL
340811	2006 UR_{11}	—	October 17, 2006	Mount Lemmon	Mount Lemmon Survey	CYB	3.7 km	MPC · JPL
340812	2006 UM_{20}	—	October 16, 2006	Kitt Peak	Spacewatch	HYG	2.7 km	MPC · JPL
340813	2006 UD_{26}	—	October 16, 2006	Mount Lemmon	Mount Lemmon Survey	·	4.6 km	MPC · JPL
340814	2006 UR_{29}	—	October 16, 2006	Kitt Peak	Spacewatch	VER	3.3 km	MPC · JPL
340815	2006 UW_{55}	—	October 18, 2006	Kitt Peak	Spacewatch	EOS	2.0 km	MPC · JPL
340816	2006 UE_{56}	—	November 20, 2001	Socorro	LINEAR	VER	2.9 km	MPC · JPL
340817	2006 UE_{80}	—	October 17, 2006	Mount Lemmon	Mount Lemmon Survey	·	3.6 km	MPC · JPL
340818	2006 UQ_{82}	—	October 17, 2006	Kitt Peak	Spacewatch	·	4.7 km	MPC · JPL
340819	2006 UT_{87}	—	October 17, 2006	Mount Lemmon	Mount Lemmon Survey	CYB	4.6 km	MPC · JPL
340820	2006 UU_{96}	—	October 18, 2006	Kitt Peak	Spacewatch	·	3.1 km	MPC · JPL
340821	2006 UQ_{110}	—	October 19, 2006	Kitt Peak	Spacewatch	·	4.1 km	MPC · JPL
340822	2006 UT_{125}	—	October 19, 2006	Kitt Peak	Spacewatch	CYB	3.2 km	MPC · JPL
340823	2006 UY_{131}	—	October 19, 2006	Palomar	NEAT	·	3.1 km	MPC · JPL
340824	2006 UN_{147}	—	October 20, 2006	Mount Lemmon	Mount Lemmon Survey	EUP	5.7 km	MPC · JPL
340825	2006 UL_{148}	—	October 20, 2006	Mount Lemmon	Mount Lemmon Survey	·	3.5 km	MPC · JPL
340826	2006 UF_{152}	—	October 20, 2006	Catalina	CSS	CYB	4.5 km	MPC · JPL
340827	2006 UR_{175}	—	October 16, 2006	Catalina	CSS	·	3.4 km	MPC · JPL
340828	2006 UW_{175}	—	October 16, 2006	Catalina	CSS	·	3.5 km	MPC · JPL
340829	2006 UD_{209}	—	October 23, 2006	Kitt Peak	Spacewatch	·	3.6 km	MPC · JPL
340830	2006 UU_{241}	—	October 27, 2006	Kitt Peak	Spacewatch	·	3.1 km	MPC · JPL
340831	2006 UO_{242}	—	October 27, 2006	Kitt Peak	Spacewatch	·	930 m	MPC · JPL
340832	2006 UE_{262}	—	October 28, 2006	Mount Lemmon	Mount Lemmon Survey	·	1.1 km	MPC · JPL
340833	2006 UU_{270}	—	October 27, 2006	Mount Lemmon	Mount Lemmon Survey	·	740 m	MPC · JPL
340834	2006 UP_{306}	—	September 17, 1995	Kitt Peak	Spacewatch	·	3.0 km	MPC · JPL
340835	2006 VO_{4}	—	November 9, 2006	Kitt Peak	Spacewatch	CYB	5.3 km	MPC · JPL
340836	2006 VO_{13}	—	November 14, 2006	Kitt Peak	Spacewatch	·	1.4 km	MPC · JPL
340837	2006 VC_{96}	—	November 10, 2006	Kitt Peak	Spacewatch	·	780 m	MPC · JPL
340838	2006 VL_{129}	—	November 15, 2006	Socorro	LINEAR	CYB	6.3 km	MPC · JPL
340839	2006 VB_{139}	—	November 15, 2006	Mount Lemmon	Mount Lemmon Survey	V	790 m	MPC · JPL
340840	2006 WF_{11}	—	November 16, 2006	Socorro	LINEAR	·	1.1 km	MPC · JPL
340841	2006 WJ_{39}	—	November 16, 2006	Kitt Peak	Spacewatch	CYB	5.7 km	MPC · JPL
340842	2006 WT_{69}	—	November 18, 2006	Kitt Peak	Spacewatch	HYG	3.2 km	MPC · JPL
340843	2006 WJ_{89}	—	November 18, 2006	Kitt Peak	Spacewatch	·	780 m	MPC · JPL
340844	2006 WK_{139}	—	November 19, 2006	Kitt Peak	Spacewatch	·	860 m	MPC · JPL
340845	2006 WY_{150}	—	November 20, 2006	Mount Lemmon	Mount Lemmon Survey	3:2	6.6 km	MPC · JPL
340846	2006 XH_{22}	—	December 12, 2006	Kitt Peak	Spacewatch	·	830 m	MPC · JPL
340847	2006 XY_{26}	—	December 12, 2006	Catalina	CSS	T_{j} (2.93)	4.5 km	MPC · JPL
340848	2006 XO_{27}	—	December 13, 2006	Kitt Peak	Spacewatch	·	1.0 km	MPC · JPL
340849	2006 XJ_{31}	—	December 13, 2006	Kitt Peak	Spacewatch	·	640 m	MPC · JPL
340850	2006 XN_{37}	—	December 11, 2006	Kitt Peak	Spacewatch	·	1.0 km	MPC · JPL
340851	2006 YZ_{29}	—	December 21, 2006	Kitt Peak	Spacewatch	·	800 m	MPC · JPL
340852	2006 YP_{34}	—	December 21, 2006	Kitt Peak	Spacewatch	·	970 m	MPC · JPL
340853	2006 YP_{46}	—	December 21, 2006	Mount Lemmon	Mount Lemmon Survey	·	880 m	MPC · JPL
340854	2006 YN_{54}	—	December 24, 2006	Kitt Peak	Spacewatch	·	1.4 km	MPC · JPL
340855	2007 AB_{8}	—	January 11, 2007	Pla D'Arguines	R. Ferrando	·	850 m	MPC · JPL
340856	2007 AS_{23}	—	January 10, 2007	Mount Lemmon	Mount Lemmon Survey	·	750 m	MPC · JPL
340857	2007 AL_{28}	—	January 9, 2007	Kitt Peak	Spacewatch	·	1.1 km	MPC · JPL
340858	2007 BQ_{5}	—	January 17, 2007	Palomar	NEAT	·	850 m	MPC · JPL
340859	2007 BQ_{7}	—	January 17, 2007	Kitt Peak	Spacewatch	·	4.2 km	MPC · JPL
340860	2007 BL_{10}	—	January 17, 2007	Palomar	NEAT	·	680 m	MPC · JPL
340861	2007 BN_{17}	—	January 17, 2007	Palomar	NEAT	·	1.2 km	MPC · JPL
340862	2007 BG_{23}	—	January 24, 2007	Mount Lemmon	Mount Lemmon Survey	·	750 m	MPC · JPL
340863	2007 BH_{24}	—	January 24, 2007	Mount Lemmon	Mount Lemmon Survey	·	790 m	MPC · JPL
340864	2007 BM_{24}	—	January 24, 2007	Mount Lemmon	Mount Lemmon Survey	·	720 m	MPC · JPL
340865	2007 BY_{26}	—	January 24, 2007	Catalina	CSS	·	930 m	MPC · JPL
340866	2007 BF_{27}	—	January 24, 2007	Catalina	CSS	·	870 m	MPC · JPL
340867	2007 BM_{49}	—	January 22, 2007	Lulin	Lin, H.-C., Q. Ye	·	1.5 km	MPC · JPL
340868	2007 BC_{63}	—	January 27, 2007	Mount Lemmon	Mount Lemmon Survey	·	1.2 km	MPC · JPL
340869	2007 BJ_{69}	—	January 27, 2007	Mount Lemmon	Mount Lemmon Survey	·	970 m	MPC · JPL
340870	2007 BA_{70}	—	January 27, 2007	Mount Lemmon	Mount Lemmon Survey	·	710 m	MPC · JPL
340871	2007 BU_{75}	—	January 25, 2007	Kitt Peak	Spacewatch	·	540 m	MPC · JPL
340872	2007 BR_{76}	—	January 17, 2007	Kitt Peak	Spacewatch	·	880 m	MPC · JPL
340873	2007 BX_{76}	—	January 9, 2007	Kitt Peak	Spacewatch	NYS	1.5 km	MPC · JPL
340874	2007 BE_{79}	—	January 27, 2007	Kitt Peak	Spacewatch	·	1.7 km	MPC · JPL
340875	2007 BW_{101}	—	January 17, 2007	Kitt Peak	Spacewatch	·	1.5 km	MPC · JPL
340876	2007 CY_{2}	—	February 6, 2007	Kitt Peak	Spacewatch	·	690 m	MPC · JPL
340877	2007 CR_{10}	—	February 6, 2007	Mount Lemmon	Mount Lemmon Survey	·	1.2 km	MPC · JPL
340878	2007 CE_{16}	—	February 6, 2007	Mount Lemmon	Mount Lemmon Survey	·	1.2 km	MPC · JPL
340879	2007 CF_{21}	—	February 6, 2007	Mount Lemmon	Mount Lemmon Survey	V	700 m	MPC · JPL
340880	2007 CE_{25}	—	February 8, 2007	Kitt Peak	Spacewatch	·	1.1 km	MPC · JPL
340881	2007 CZ_{25}	—	February 9, 2007	Kitt Peak	Spacewatch	·	950 m	MPC · JPL
340882	2007 CH_{36}	—	February 6, 2007	Kitt Peak	Spacewatch	·	1.4 km	MPC · JPL
340883	2007 CC_{39}	—	February 6, 2007	Mount Lemmon	Mount Lemmon Survey	·	1.5 km	MPC · JPL
340884	2007 CA_{42}	—	February 7, 2007	Kitt Peak	Spacewatch	·	950 m	MPC · JPL
340885	2007 CQ_{42}	—	February 7, 2007	Mount Lemmon	Mount Lemmon Survey	AGN	1.2 km	MPC · JPL
340886	2007 CR_{45}	—	February 8, 2007	Palomar	NEAT	T_{j} (2.98) · 3:2	6.0 km	MPC · JPL
340887	2007 CQ_{49}	—	February 10, 2007	Mount Lemmon	Mount Lemmon Survey	·	870 m	MPC · JPL
340888	2007 CY_{52}	—	February 13, 2007	Socorro	LINEAR	·	980 m	MPC · JPL
340889	2007 CL_{53}	—	January 17, 2007	Kitt Peak	Spacewatch	·	1.6 km	MPC · JPL
340890	2007 CQ_{53}	—	February 15, 2007	Palomar	NEAT	·	930 m	MPC · JPL
340891 Londoncommorch	2007 CO_{54}	Londoncommorch	February 14, 2007	Lulin	Q. Ye, Lin, C.-S.	·	1.0 km	MPC · JPL
340892	2007 CN_{57}	—	February 9, 2007	Catalina	CSS	·	960 m	MPC · JPL
340893	2007 CQ_{57}	—	February 9, 2007	Catalina	CSS	HIL · 3:2 · (6124)	6.0 km	MPC · JPL
340894	2007 CG_{60}	—	February 10, 2007	Catalina	CSS	·	1.5 km	MPC · JPL
340895	2007 CH_{63}	—	February 15, 2007	Palomar	NEAT	·	2.5 km	MPC · JPL
340896	2007 CJ_{63}	—	February 15, 2007	Palomar	NEAT	·	1.1 km	MPC · JPL
340897	2007 CQ_{64}	—	February 10, 2007	Mount Lemmon	Mount Lemmon Survey	·	850 m	MPC · JPL
340898	2007 DV_{3}	—	February 16, 2007	Mount Lemmon	Mount Lemmon Survey	·	850 m	MPC · JPL
340899	2007 DA_{15}	—	February 17, 2007	Kitt Peak	Spacewatch	·	780 m	MPC · JPL
340900	2007 DB_{21}	—	February 17, 2007	Kitt Peak	Spacewatch	·	830 m	MPC · JPL

== 340901–341000 ==
back to top

Designation			Discovery			Properties		Ref
Permanent	Provisional	Named after	Date	Site	Discoverer(s)	Category	Diam.	Ref
340901	2007 DU_{25}	—	February 17, 2007	Kitt Peak	Spacewatch	·	980 m	MPC · JPL
340902	2007 DK_{26}	—	February 17, 2007	Kitt Peak	Spacewatch	·	830 m	MPC · JPL
340903	2007 DX_{26}	—	February 17, 2007	Kitt Peak	Spacewatch	·	840 m	MPC · JPL
340904	2007 DE_{33}	—	February 17, 2007	Kitt Peak	Spacewatch	·	750 m	MPC · JPL
340905	2007 DT_{33}	—	February 17, 2007	Kitt Peak	Spacewatch	·	780 m	MPC · JPL
340906	2007 DB_{37}	—	February 17, 2007	Kitt Peak	Spacewatch	·	800 m	MPC · JPL
340907	2007 DC_{38}	—	February 17, 2007	Kitt Peak	Spacewatch	·	1.5 km	MPC · JPL
340908	2007 DM_{38}	—	February 17, 2007	Kitt Peak	Spacewatch	NYS	1.2 km	MPC · JPL
340909	2007 DP_{38}	—	February 17, 2007	Kitt Peak	Spacewatch	·	1.2 km	MPC · JPL
340910	2007 DZ_{46}	—	February 21, 2007	Socorro	LINEAR	·	770 m	MPC · JPL
340911	2007 DB_{52}	—	February 17, 2007	Mount Lemmon	Mount Lemmon Survey	V	700 m	MPC · JPL
340912	2007 DX_{53}	—	February 19, 2007	Mount Lemmon	Mount Lemmon Survey	L5 · (291316) · 010	13 km	MPC · JPL
340913	2007 DH_{64}	—	February 21, 2007	Kitt Peak	Spacewatch	·	1.3 km	MPC · JPL
340914	2007 DU_{72}	—	February 21, 2007	Kitt Peak	Spacewatch	MAS	740 m	MPC · JPL
340915	2007 DW_{75}	—	February 21, 2007	Mount Lemmon	Mount Lemmon Survey	NYS	1.1 km	MPC · JPL
340916	2007 DM_{80}	—	February 23, 2007	Mount Lemmon	Mount Lemmon Survey	·	1.2 km	MPC · JPL
340917	2007 DP_{91}	—	November 24, 2006	Kitt Peak	Spacewatch	·	850 m	MPC · JPL
340918	2007 DZ_{95}	—	February 23, 2007	Kitt Peak	Spacewatch	·	1.1 km	MPC · JPL
340919	2007 DU_{96}	—	February 17, 2007	Mount Lemmon	Mount Lemmon Survey	·	1.3 km	MPC · JPL
340920	2007 DM_{105}	—	February 16, 2007	Mount Lemmon	Mount Lemmon Survey	·	780 m	MPC · JPL
340921	2007 DB_{111}	—	February 23, 2007	Mount Lemmon	Mount Lemmon Survey	NYS	1.4 km	MPC · JPL
340922	2007 DY_{111}	—	February 25, 2007	Mount Lemmon	Mount Lemmon Survey	PHO	1.3 km	MPC · JPL
340923	2007 DE_{112}	—	February 26, 2007	Mount Lemmon	Mount Lemmon Survey	·	1.7 km	MPC · JPL
340924	2007 DD_{114}	—	February 25, 2007	Mount Lemmon	Mount Lemmon Survey	EUN	1.9 km	MPC · JPL
340925	2007 DG_{115}	—	February 23, 2007	Kitt Peak	Spacewatch	L5	10 km	MPC · JPL
340926	2007 EP	—	November 16, 2006	Mount Lemmon	Mount Lemmon Survey	V	950 m	MPC · JPL
340927	2007 EK_{2}	—	March 9, 2007	Kitt Peak	Spacewatch	·	1.7 km	MPC · JPL
340928	2007 EU_{4}	—	January 28, 2003	Kitt Peak	Spacewatch	·	1.1 km	MPC · JPL
340929 Bourgelat	2007 ET_{9}	Bourgelat	March 9, 2007	Saint-Sulpice	B. Christophe	·	620 m	MPC · JPL
340930	2007 EF_{11}	—	March 9, 2007	Kitt Peak	Spacewatch	·	1.6 km	MPC · JPL
340931	2007 EH_{12}	—	March 9, 2007	Palomar	NEAT	·	980 m	MPC · JPL
340932	2007 EE_{17}	—	March 9, 2007	Catalina	CSS	·	1.7 km	MPC · JPL
340933	2007 EQ_{20}	—	March 10, 2007	Kitt Peak	Spacewatch	V	790 m	MPC · JPL
340934	2007 EJ_{21}	—	March 10, 2007	Kitt Peak	Spacewatch	CLA	1.8 km	MPC · JPL
340935	2007 EP_{21}	—	March 10, 2007	Mount Lemmon	Mount Lemmon Survey	·	1.2 km	MPC · JPL
340936	2007 EF_{25}	—	March 10, 2007	Mount Lemmon	Mount Lemmon Survey	MAS	900 m	MPC · JPL
340937	2007 EV_{34}	—	March 10, 2007	Palomar	NEAT	·	1.5 km	MPC · JPL
340938	2007 EF_{37}	—	March 11, 2007	Mount Lemmon	Mount Lemmon Survey	JUN	1.1 km	MPC · JPL
340939	2007 EP_{39}	—	March 12, 2007	Marly	P. Kocher	·	940 m	MPC · JPL
340940	2007 EK_{41}	—	March 9, 2007	Catalina	CSS	·	1.6 km	MPC · JPL
340941	2007 EY_{43}	—	March 9, 2007	Kitt Peak	Spacewatch	·	1.4 km	MPC · JPL
340942	2007 EB_{45}	—	March 9, 2007	Catalina	CSS	·	1.5 km	MPC · JPL
340943	2007 EC_{45}	—	March 9, 2007	Kitt Peak	Spacewatch	L5	10 km	MPC · JPL
340944	2007 EO_{45}	—	March 9, 2007	Kitt Peak	Spacewatch	·	1.2 km	MPC · JPL
340945	2007 EA_{49}	—	March 9, 2007	Kitt Peak	Spacewatch	·	1.2 km	MPC · JPL
340946	2007 EO_{56}	—	March 12, 2007	Kitt Peak	Spacewatch	RAF	810 m	MPC · JPL
340947	2007 EJ_{58}	—	March 9, 2007	Mount Lemmon	Mount Lemmon Survey	·	1.5 km	MPC · JPL
340948	2007 ES_{66}	—	March 10, 2007	Kitt Peak	Spacewatch	L5	13 km	MPC · JPL
340949	2007 EO_{68}	—	March 10, 2007	Palomar	NEAT	·	880 m	MPC · JPL
340950	2007 EV_{70}	—	March 10, 2007	Kitt Peak	Spacewatch	·	1.2 km	MPC · JPL
340951	2007 ER_{71}	—	March 10, 2007	Kitt Peak	Spacewatch	L5	10 km	MPC · JPL
340952	2007 EN_{75}	—	March 10, 2007	Kitt Peak	Spacewatch	·	1.6 km	MPC · JPL
340953	2007 EU_{77}	—	March 10, 2007	Mount Lemmon	Mount Lemmon Survey	L5 · (291316) · 010	9.9 km	MPC · JPL
340954	2007 EL_{79}	—	March 10, 2007	Kitt Peak	Spacewatch	·	1.5 km	MPC · JPL
340955	2007 EY_{81}	—	March 11, 2007	Catalina	CSS	·	3.1 km	MPC · JPL
340956	2007 EK_{85}	—	March 12, 2007	Kitt Peak	Spacewatch	PHO	2.9 km	MPC · JPL
340957	2007 ER_{88}	—	February 27, 2007	Kitt Peak	Spacewatch	·	920 m	MPC · JPL
340958	2007 ET_{88}	—	March 9, 2007	Kitt Peak	Spacewatch	·	1.7 km	MPC · JPL
340959	2007 EZ_{89}	—	March 9, 2007	Mount Lemmon	Mount Lemmon Survey	·	740 m	MPC · JPL
340960	2007 EH_{92}	—	February 23, 2007	Kitt Peak	Spacewatch	·	1.4 km	MPC · JPL
340961	2007 EW_{92}	—	March 10, 2007	Mount Lemmon	Mount Lemmon Survey	3:2 · SHU	5.1 km	MPC · JPL
340962	2007 ET_{98}	—	March 11, 2007	Kitt Peak	Spacewatch	V	960 m	MPC · JPL
340963	2007 EH_{101}	—	March 11, 2007	Kitt Peak	Spacewatch	·	900 m	MPC · JPL
340964	2007 EJ_{101}	—	March 11, 2007	Kitt Peak	Spacewatch	·	1.4 km	MPC · JPL
340965	2007 EA_{105}	—	March 11, 2007	Mount Lemmon	Mount Lemmon Survey	·	1.0 km	MPC · JPL
340966	2007 EG_{106}	—	March 11, 2007	Kitt Peak	Spacewatch	L5	9.6 km	MPC · JPL
340967	2007 EA_{111}	—	March 11, 2007	Kitt Peak	Spacewatch	·	1.3 km	MPC · JPL
340968	2007 EL_{112}	—	March 11, 2007	Mount Lemmon	Mount Lemmon Survey	·	1.5 km	MPC · JPL
340969	2007 EF_{116}	—	March 13, 2007	Mount Lemmon	Mount Lemmon Survey	·	1.3 km	MPC · JPL
340970	2007 EP_{117}	—	March 13, 2007	Mount Lemmon	Mount Lemmon Survey	·	1.5 km	MPC · JPL
340971	2007 EY_{117}	—	March 13, 2007	Mount Lemmon	Mount Lemmon Survey	·	1.3 km	MPC · JPL
340972	2007 EM_{130}	—	March 9, 2007	Mount Lemmon	Mount Lemmon Survey	·	810 m	MPC · JPL
340973	2007 EF_{137}	—	February 10, 2007	Catalina	CSS	·	1.2 km	MPC · JPL
340974	2007 EW_{137}	—	March 11, 2007	Anderson Mesa	LONEOS	·	940 m	MPC · JPL
340975	2007 EG_{141}	—	March 12, 2007	Kitt Peak	Spacewatch	·	1.4 km	MPC · JPL
340976	2007 EH_{167}	—	March 12, 2007	Mount Lemmon	Mount Lemmon Survey	·	950 m	MPC · JPL
340977	2007 EK_{167}	—	March 12, 2007	Catalina	CSS	·	2.9 km	MPC · JPL
340978	2007 ET_{167}	—	March 13, 2007	Mount Lemmon	Mount Lemmon Survey	·	810 m	MPC · JPL
340979	2007 EF_{169}	—	March 13, 2007	Kitt Peak	Spacewatch	NYS	1.0 km	MPC · JPL
340980 Bad Vilbel	2007 EJ_{171}	Bad Vilbel	March 15, 2007	Bergen-Enkheim	Suessenberger, U.	V	810 m	MPC · JPL
340981	2007 EC_{175}	—	March 14, 2007	Kitt Peak	Spacewatch	NYS	2.4 km	MPC · JPL
340982	2007 EB_{176}	—	March 14, 2007	Kitt Peak	Spacewatch	·	1.1 km	MPC · JPL
340983	2007 EC_{181}	—	March 14, 2007	Kitt Peak	Spacewatch	EUN	1.5 km	MPC · JPL
340984	2007 EW_{182}	—	March 7, 2003	Anderson Mesa	LONEOS	·	1.4 km	MPC · JPL
340985	2007 ED_{183}	—	March 12, 2007	Mount Lemmon	Mount Lemmon Survey	·	1.5 km	MPC · JPL
340986	2007 ET_{185}	—	March 14, 2007	Mount Lemmon	Mount Lemmon Survey	·	980 m	MPC · JPL
340987	2007 EY_{191}	—	March 13, 2007	Kitt Peak	Spacewatch	·	700 m	MPC · JPL
340988	2007 EM_{192}	—	March 14, 2007	Kitt Peak	Spacewatch	·	1.4 km	MPC · JPL
340989	2007 EU_{192}	—	March 10, 2007	Mount Lemmon	Mount Lemmon Survey	·	1.2 km	MPC · JPL
340990	2007 EB_{198}	—	March 15, 2007	Kitt Peak	Spacewatch	·	1.2 km	MPC · JPL
340991	2007 EH_{198}	—	March 15, 2007	Mount Lemmon	Mount Lemmon Survey	·	1.7 km	MPC · JPL
340992	2007 EJ_{198}	—	March 15, 2007	Mount Lemmon	Mount Lemmon Survey	L5	12 km	MPC · JPL
340993	2007 EL_{199}	—	March 13, 2007	Catalina	CSS	PHO	4.1 km	MPC · JPL
340994	2007 EA_{210}	—	March 8, 2007	Palomar	NEAT	·	1.1 km	MPC · JPL
340995	2007 EK_{212}	—	March 8, 2007	Palomar	NEAT	·	980 m	MPC · JPL
340996	2007 EL_{214}	—	March 9, 2007	Kitt Peak	Spacewatch	·	1.1 km	MPC · JPL
340997	2007 EO_{215}	—	March 12, 2007	Catalina	CSS	·	1.4 km	MPC · JPL
340998	2007 EP_{215}	—	March 12, 2007	Catalina	CSS	·	960 m	MPC · JPL
340999	2007 EV_{216}	—	March 15, 2007	Catalina	CSS	·	1.8 km	MPC · JPL
341000	2007 EK_{220}	—	March 14, 2007	Kitt Peak	Spacewatch	V	700 m	MPC · JPL

back to top

== See also ==
- Meanings of minor-planet names: 340001–341000
