= Cordell–Lorenz Observatory =

Observatory in Tennessee, US

- Organization: University of the South
- Observatory code: 850
- Location: Sewanee, Tennessee, United States
- Coordinates: 35°12′16″N 85°55′12″W
- Altitude: 590 m (1,940 ft)
- Weather: www.cleardarksky.com
- Website: clo.sewanee.edu

Telescopes
- unnamed: 6 inch Alvan Clark refractor

Minor planets discovered: 28
see § List of discovered minor planets

Cordell–Lorenz Observatory (850) is an astronomical observatory owned and operated by Sewanee:The University of the South. It is located in Sewanee, Tennessee, United States.

The Observatory has an 1897 vintage 6 inch Alvan Clark refractor located in the main dome and several other telescopes that feature apertures between 3.5 and 12.5 inches. Public observation sessions are held on Thursdays from 8pm to 10pm when the University is in session, meaning from mid-August to mid-December and from mid-January to mid-May.

== List of discovered minor planets ==
| (90505) 2004 EM_{16} | 12 March 2004 | list |
| (129081) 2004 VH_{75} | 14 November 2004 | list |
| (145155) 2005 HD | 16 April 2005 | list |
| (145576) 2006 PE | 3 August 2006 | list |
| (154491) 2003 FM_{2} | 24 March 2003 | list |
| (198445) 2004 XD_{3} | 3 December 2004 | list |
| (209559) 2004 XC_{3} | 3 December 2004 | list |
| (211850) 2004 FQ_{133} | 23 March 2004 | list |
| (216048) 2006 OQ_{10} | 26 July 2006 | list |
| (233228) 2005 YW_{38} | 22 December 2005 | list |
| (255070) 2005 UP_{3} | 26 October 2005 | list |
| (256319) 2006 XB_{4} | 14 December 2006 | list |
| (256431) 2007 BG_{73} | 29 January 2007 | list |
| (261824) 2006 CC_{62} | 7 February 2006 | list |

| (262110) 2006 SG | 16 September 2006 | list |
| (265746) 2005 VA_{6} | 11 November 2005 | list |
| (290871) 2005 WJ_{57} | 26 November 2005 | list |
| (300643) 2007 UQ_{65} | 31 October 2007 | list |
| (304949) 2007 TD_{17} | 7 October 2007 | list |
| (340256) 2006 BW_{139} | 30 January 2006 | list |
| (340724) 2006 SM_{131} | 26 September 2006 | list |
| (345585) 2006 SQ_{49} | 20 September 2006 | list |
| (371543) 2006 UV_{291} | 24 October 2006 | list |
| (388619) 2007 TT_{20} | 8 October 2007 | list |
| (394059) 2005 XB_{5} | 6 December 2005 | list |
| (414068) 2007 TX_{20} | 10 October 2007 | list |
| (440820) 2006 RY | 3 September 2006 | list |
| (476867) 2008 VD_{5} | 6 November 2008 | list |

== See also ==
- E. S. Beeson
- List of asteroid-discovering observatories
- List of astronomical observatories
- List of minor planet discoverers § Discovering dedicated institutions
