= Meanings of minor-planet names: 340001–341000 =

As minor planet discoveries are confirmed, they are given a permanent number by the IAU's Minor Planet Center (MPC), and the discoverers can then submit names for them, following the IAU's naming conventions. The list below concerns those minor planets in the specified number-range that have received names, and explains the meanings of those names.

Official naming citations of newly named small Solar System bodies are approved and published in a bulletin by IAU's Working Group for Small Bodies Nomenclature (WGSBN). Before May 2021, citations were published in MPC's Minor Planet Circulars for many decades. Recent citations can also be found on the JPL Small-Body Database (SBDB). Until his death in 2016, German astronomer Lutz D. Schmadel compiled these citations into the Dictionary of Minor Planet Names (DMP) and regularly updated the collection.

Based on Paul Herget's The Names of the Minor Planets, Schmadel also researched the unclear origin of numerous asteroids, most of which had been named prior to World War II. This article incorporates text from this source, which is in the public domain: SBDB New namings may only be added to this list below after official publication as the preannouncement of names is condemned. The WGSBN publishes a comprehensive guideline for the naming rules of non-cometary small Solar System bodies.

== 340001–340100 ==
Named minor planet	Provisional	This minor planet was named for...	Ref · Catalog
340071 Vanmunster	2005 VF_{82}	Tonny Vanmunster (born 1961), a Belgian amateur astronomer.	JPL · 340071

== 340101–340200 ==
back to top

Named minor planet	Provisional	This minor planet was named for...	Ref · Catalog
There are no named minor planets in this number range

== 340201–340300 ==
back to top

Named minor planet	Provisional	This minor planet was named for...	Ref · Catalog
There are no named minor planets in this number range

== 340301–340400 ==
back to top

Named minor planet	Provisional	This minor planet was named for...	Ref · Catalog
There are no named minor planets in this number range

== 340401–340500 ==
back to top

Named minor planet	Provisional	This minor planet was named for...	Ref · Catalog
340479 Broca	2006 HO_{57}	Pierre Paul Broca (1824–1880) was a French physician, anatomist and anthropologist. He is best known for his research on Broca's area, a region of the frontal lobe of the hominid brain that has been named after him.	JPL · 340479

== 340501–340600 ==
back to top

Named minor planet	Provisional	This minor planet was named for...	Ref · Catalog
340579 Losse	2006 PY	Florent Losse (born 1960) was the founder of the St Pardon de Conques observatory (code I93) and the author of the Reduc software for binaries. He is the editor of the review Étoiles Doubles and correspondent with the USNO for integrating measures into the Washington Double Star Catalogue.	IAU · 340579

== 340601–340700 ==
back to top

Named minor planet	Provisional	This minor planet was named for...	Ref · Catalog
340687 Gerrysmith	2006 RA_{108}	Gerald (Gerry) M. Smith, American engineer.	IAU · 340687

== 340701–340800 ==
back to top

Named minor planet	Provisional	This minor planet was named for...	Ref · Catalog
There are no named minor planets in this number range

== 340801–340900 ==
back to top

Named minor planet	Provisional	This minor planet was named for...	Ref · Catalog
340891 Londoncommorch	2007 CO_{54}	The London Community Orchestra (Orchestra London Canada), founded in London, Canada in 1974 (Src)	JPL · 340891

== 340901–341000 ==
back to top

Named minor planet	Provisional	This minor planet was named for...	Ref · Catalog
340929 Bourgelat	2007 ET_{9}	Claude Bourgelat (1712–1779) was a French veterinary surgeon. He was the founder of the Lyon veterinary college in 1761, the first veterinary school in the world.	JPL · 340929
340980 Bad Vilbel	2007 EJ_{171}	Bad Vilbel, a spa town in Hesse, Germany, known for its mineral springs	JPL · 340980

back to top

Preceded by 339,001–340,000	Meanings of minor-planet names List of minor planets: 340,001–341,000	Succeeded by 341,001–342,000
