= Meanings of minor-planet names: 341001–342000 =

As minor planet discoveries are confirmed, they are given a permanent number by the IAU's Minor Planet Center (MPC), and the discoverers can then submit names for them, following the IAU's naming conventions. The list below concerns those minor planets in the specified number-range that have received names, and explains the meanings of those names.

Official naming citations of newly named small Solar System bodies are approved and published in a bulletin by IAU's Working Group for Small Bodies Nomenclature (WGSBN). Before May 2021, citations were published in MPC's Minor Planet Circulars for many decades. Recent citations can also be found on the JPL Small-Body Database (SBDB). Until his death in 2016, German astronomer Lutz D. Schmadel compiled these citations into the Dictionary of Minor Planet Names (DMP) and regularly updated the collection.

Based on Paul Herget's The Names of the Minor Planets, Schmadel also researched the unclear origin of numerous asteroids, most of which had been named prior to World War II. This article incorporates text from this source, which is in the public domain: SBDB New namings may only be added to this list below after official publication as the preannouncement of names is condemned. The WGSBN publishes a comprehensive guideline for the naming rules of non-cometary small Solar System bodies.

== 341001–341100 ==
Named minor planet	Provisional	This minor planet was named for...	Ref · Catalog
There are no named minor planets in this number range

== 341101–341200 ==
back to top

Named minor planet	Provisional	This minor planet was named for...	Ref · Catalog
There are no named minor planets in this number range

== 341201–341300 ==
back to top

Named minor planet	Provisional	This minor planet was named for...	Ref · Catalog
There are no named minor planets in this number range

== 341301–341400 ==
back to top

Named minor planet	Provisional	This minor planet was named for...	Ref · Catalog
341317 Weisshaidinger	2007 TE	Lukas Weisshaidinger (born 1992) is an Austrian discus thrower and shot putter. He won the bronze medal for discus at both the 2018 European Championship and 2019 World Championship.	IAU · 341317
341359 Gregneumann	2007 TV_{69}	Gregory A. Neumann (born 1947), an American planetary scientist involved NASA's MGS, LRO, GRAIL and MESSENGER missions	JPL · 341359
341361 Hughespack	2007 TP_{73}	Description available (see ref). Please summarize in your own words.	IAU · 341361

== 341401–341500 ==
back to top

Named minor planet	Provisional	This minor planet was named for...	Ref · Catalog
There are no named minor planets in this number range

== 341501–341600 ==
back to top

Named minor planet	Provisional	This minor planet was named for...	Ref · Catalog
341520 Mors–Somnus	2007 TY_{430}	Mors and Somnus, the twin gods of the underworld and offspring of Nox in Roman mythology	JPL · 341520
341590 Emmawatson	2007 UM_{90}	Emma Watson (born 1990) is an English actress and activist. She has gained recognition for her roles in both blockbuster and independent films, as well as her women's rights work.	IAU · 341590

== 341601–341700 ==
back to top

Named minor planet	Provisional	This minor planet was named for...	Ref · Catalog
There are no named minor planets in this number range

== 341701–341800 ==
back to top

Named minor planet	Provisional	This minor planet was named for...	Ref · Catalog
There are no named minor planets in this number range

== 341801–341900 ==
back to top

Named minor planet	Provisional	This minor planet was named for...	Ref · Catalog
341826 Aurelbaier	2008 AC_{30}	Aurel Baier (born 1980) has studied informatics and is currently developing and maintaining various software systems. In his leisure time he promotes astronomy to the public. He is a member of the committee of the Observatory of Ependes and each year organizes a public event for Astronomy Day in Switzerland.	JPL · 341826

== 341901–342000 ==
back to top

Named minor planet	Provisional	This minor planet was named for...	Ref · Catalog
341958 Chrétien	2008 PW_{21}	Henri Chrétien (1879–1956), a French astronomer and optician.	JPL · 341958
342000 Neumünster	2008 RV_{26}	The German city of Neumünster, Schleswig-Holstein, has supported astronomical education since 1969. Currently they operate an observatory that offers astronomical courses and public observing. The observatory focuses on education.	JPL · 342000

back to top

Preceded by 340,001–341,000	Meanings of minor-planet names List of minor planets: 341,001–342,000	Succeeded by 342,001–343,000
