= List of minor planets: 341001–342000 =

The following is a partial list of minor planets, running from minor-planet number 341001 through 342000, inclusive. The primary data for this and other partial lists is based on JPL's "Small-Body Orbital Elements" and data available from the Minor Planet Center. Critical list information is also provided by the MPC, unless otherwise specified from Lowell Observatory. A detailed description of the table's columns and additional sources are given on the main page including a complete list of every page in this series, and a statistical break-up on the dynamical classification of minor planets.

Also see the summary list of all named bodies in numerical and alphabetical order, and the corresponding naming citations for the number range of this particular list. New namings may only be added to this list after official publication, as the preannouncement of names is condemned by the Working Group for Small Bodies Nomenclature of the International Astronomical Union.

Near-Earth obj.	MBA (inner)	MBA (outer)	Centaur
Mars-crosser	MBA (middle)	Jupiter trojan	Trans-Neptunian obj.
Unclassified

== 341001–341100 ==
Designation			Discovery			Properties		Ref
Permanent	Provisional	Named after	Date	Site	Discoverer(s)	Category	Diam.	Ref
341001	2007 FP_{2}	—	March 16, 2007	Catalina	CSS	·	2.3 km	MPC · JPL
341002	2007 FP_{16}	—	January 27, 2007	Mount Lemmon	Mount Lemmon Survey	MAS	720 m	MPC · JPL
341003	2007 FO_{20}	—	March 16, 2007	Mount Lemmon	Mount Lemmon Survey	V	810 m	MPC · JPL
341004	2007 FB_{23}	—	March 20, 2007	Kitt Peak	Spacewatch	L5	11 km	MPC · JPL
341005	2007 FD_{24}	—	March 20, 2007	Kitt Peak	Spacewatch	V	780 m	MPC · JPL
341006	2007 FY_{24}	—	March 20, 2007	Kitt Peak	Spacewatch	·	940 m	MPC · JPL
341007	2007 FU_{27}	—	March 20, 2007	Mount Lemmon	Mount Lemmon Survey	·	1.1 km	MPC · JPL
341008	2007 FH_{30}	—	March 20, 2007	Mount Lemmon	Mount Lemmon Survey	L5	8.8 km	MPC · JPL
341009	2007 FC_{31}	—	March 20, 2007	Kitt Peak	Spacewatch	NYS	1.1 km	MPC · JPL
341010	2007 FT_{31}	—	March 20, 2007	Kitt Peak	Spacewatch	MAS	920 m	MPC · JPL
341011	2007 FY_{33}	—	March 25, 2007	Mount Lemmon	Mount Lemmon Survey	·	1.5 km	MPC · JPL
341012	2007 FF_{34}	—	March 25, 2007	Mount Lemmon	Mount Lemmon Survey	V	660 m	MPC · JPL
341013	2007 FL_{34}	—	March 25, 2007	Catalina	CSS	·	1.1 km	MPC · JPL
341014	2007 FN_{39}	—	October 9, 2005	Kitt Peak	Spacewatch	ERI	2.2 km	MPC · JPL
341015	2007 FG_{44}	—	March 16, 2007	Mount Lemmon	Mount Lemmon Survey	L5	8.4 km	MPC · JPL
341016	2007 FV_{47}	—	March 19, 2007	Mount Lemmon	Mount Lemmon Survey	·	1.4 km	MPC · JPL
341017	2007 FZ_{48}	—	March 26, 2007	Mount Lemmon	Mount Lemmon Survey	L5	12 km	MPC · JPL
341018	2007 GX	—	March 16, 2007	Catalina	CSS	·	1.1 km	MPC · JPL
341019	2007 GA_{2}	—	April 9, 2007	Lumezzane	Lumezzane	·	920 m	MPC · JPL
341020	2007 GS_{2}	—	March 10, 2007	Mount Lemmon	Mount Lemmon Survey	·	1.2 km	MPC · JPL
341021	2007 GS_{6}	—	April 7, 2007	Mount Lemmon	Mount Lemmon Survey	L5	9.2 km	MPC · JPL
341022	2007 GW_{6}	—	April 7, 2007	Mount Lemmon	Mount Lemmon Survey	·	920 m	MPC · JPL
341023	2007 GX_{6}	—	April 7, 2007	Mount Lemmon	Mount Lemmon Survey	L5	10 km	MPC · JPL
341024	2007 GF_{8}	—	March 13, 2007	Kitt Peak	Spacewatch	·	1.1 km	MPC · JPL
341025	2007 GZ_{10}	—	April 11, 2007	Kitt Peak	Spacewatch	L5	10 km	MPC · JPL
341026	2007 GK_{15}	—	April 11, 2007	Mount Lemmon	Mount Lemmon Survey	L5	9.1 km	MPC · JPL
341027	2007 GP_{16}	—	April 11, 2007	Kitt Peak	Spacewatch	·	1.2 km	MPC · JPL
341028	2007 GZ_{16}	—	April 11, 2007	Kitt Peak	Spacewatch	·	1.7 km	MPC · JPL
341029	2007 GT_{18}	—	April 11, 2007	Kitt Peak	Spacewatch	·	1.5 km	MPC · JPL
341030	2007 GC_{19}	—	April 11, 2007	Kitt Peak	Spacewatch	·	1.2 km	MPC · JPL
341031	2007 GR_{20}	—	April 11, 2007	Mount Lemmon	Mount Lemmon Survey	·	1.9 km	MPC · JPL
341032	2007 GM_{21}	—	April 11, 2007	Mount Lemmon	Mount Lemmon Survey	V	660 m	MPC · JPL
341033	2007 GQ_{21}	—	April 11, 2007	Mount Lemmon	Mount Lemmon Survey	·	1.4 km	MPC · JPL
341034	2007 GD_{27}	—	April 14, 2007	Kitt Peak	Spacewatch	·	1.5 km	MPC · JPL
341035	2007 GY_{33}	—	April 11, 2007	Siding Spring	SSS	·	1.7 km	MPC · JPL
341036	2007 GA_{36}	—	April 14, 2007	Kitt Peak	Spacewatch	·	1.6 km	MPC · JPL
341037	2007 GU_{39}	—	April 14, 2007	Kitt Peak	Spacewatch	NYS	1.4 km	MPC · JPL
341038	2007 GM_{42}	—	April 14, 2007	Kitt Peak	Spacewatch	·	1.3 km	MPC · JPL
341039	2007 GZ_{46}	—	April 14, 2007	Kitt Peak	Spacewatch	·	1.4 km	MPC · JPL
341040	2007 GP_{47}	—	April 14, 2007	Mount Lemmon	Mount Lemmon Survey	·	1.5 km	MPC · JPL
341041	2007 GS_{53}	—	April 14, 2007	Kitt Peak	Spacewatch	·	1.5 km	MPC · JPL
341042	2007 GX_{59}	—	April 15, 2007	Kitt Peak	Spacewatch	MAS	780 m	MPC · JPL
341043	2007 GC_{63}	—	April 15, 2007	Kitt Peak	Spacewatch	·	2.4 km	MPC · JPL
341044	2007 GP_{65}	—	April 15, 2007	Kitt Peak	Spacewatch	·	1.5 km	MPC · JPL
341045	2007 GF_{67}	—	April 15, 2007	Kitt Peak	Spacewatch	·	1.9 km	MPC · JPL
341046	2007 GT_{68}	—	April 15, 2007	Mount Lemmon	Mount Lemmon Survey	NYS	1.1 km	MPC · JPL
341047	2007 GF_{70}	—	April 15, 2007	Mount Lemmon	Mount Lemmon Survey	V	830 m	MPC · JPL
341048	2007 GG_{71}	—	April 15, 2007	Catalina	CSS	·	1.4 km	MPC · JPL
341049	2007 HE	—	March 13, 2007	Mount Lemmon	Mount Lemmon Survey	·	1.2 km	MPC · JPL
341050	2007 HZ	—	April 18, 2007	Mount Lemmon	Mount Lemmon Survey	AMO	290 m	MPC · JPL
341051	2007 HN_{1}	—	April 16, 2007	Socorro	LINEAR	JUN	1.4 km	MPC · JPL
341052	2007 HW_{1}	—	April 16, 2007	Mount Lemmon	Mount Lemmon Survey	L5	8.4 km	MPC · JPL
341053	2007 HS_{2}	—	April 16, 2007	Mount Lemmon	Mount Lemmon Survey	NYS	1.3 km	MPC · JPL
341054	2007 HC_{4}	—	April 18, 2007	Kitt Peak	Spacewatch	·	1.7 km	MPC · JPL
341055	2007 HT_{5}	—	April 16, 2007	Catalina	CSS	·	1.8 km	MPC · JPL
341056	2007 HC_{8}	—	April 18, 2007	Mount Lemmon	Mount Lemmon Survey	·	2.1 km	MPC · JPL
341057	2007 HE_{8}	—	April 18, 2007	Mount Lemmon	Mount Lemmon Survey	·	1.0 km	MPC · JPL
341058	2007 HR_{12}	—	April 19, 2007	Kitt Peak	Spacewatch	·	2.4 km	MPC · JPL
341059	2007 HQ_{13}	—	April 19, 2007	Mount Lemmon	Mount Lemmon Survey	·	800 m	MPC · JPL
341060	2007 HF_{21}	—	April 18, 2007	Kitt Peak	Spacewatch	·	820 m	MPC · JPL
341061	2007 HO_{21}	—	April 18, 2007	Socorro	LINEAR	·	1.6 km	MPC · JPL
341062	2007 HW_{24}	—	April 18, 2007	Kitt Peak	Spacewatch	·	1.2 km	MPC · JPL
341063	2007 HM_{28}	—	April 19, 2007	Anderson Mesa	LONEOS	(2076)	1.5 km	MPC · JPL
341064	2007 HU_{33}	—	April 19, 2007	Kitt Peak	Spacewatch	·	1.8 km	MPC · JPL
341065	2007 HL_{37}	—	April 20, 2007	Kitt Peak	Spacewatch	·	800 m	MPC · JPL
341066	2007 HK_{43}	—	April 22, 2007	Mount Lemmon	Mount Lemmon Survey	·	1.6 km	MPC · JPL
341067	2007 HD_{46}	—	April 19, 2007	Lulin	LUSS	·	1.8 km	MPC · JPL
341068	2007 HN_{46}	—	April 20, 2007	Anderson Mesa	LONEOS	·	4.1 km	MPC · JPL
341069	2007 HE_{51}	—	April 20, 2007	Kitt Peak	Spacewatch	·	1.5 km	MPC · JPL
341070	2007 HR_{52}	—	April 20, 2007	Kitt Peak	Spacewatch	·	1.2 km	MPC · JPL
341071	2007 HA_{53}	—	April 20, 2007	Kitt Peak	Spacewatch	BAR	1.1 km	MPC · JPL
341072	2007 HW_{53}	—	April 22, 2007	Kitt Peak	Spacewatch	·	1.1 km	MPC · JPL
341073	2007 HJ_{56}	—	April 22, 2007	Kitt Peak	Spacewatch	·	1.2 km	MPC · JPL
341074	2007 HN_{62}	—	April 22, 2007	Mount Lemmon	Mount Lemmon Survey	MAS	710 m	MPC · JPL
341075	2007 HE_{67}	—	April 22, 2007	Mount Lemmon	Mount Lemmon Survey	·	1.9 km	MPC · JPL
341076	2007 HG_{69}	—	April 24, 2007	Mount Lemmon	Mount Lemmon Survey	·	1.7 km	MPC · JPL
341077	2007 HA_{75}	—	April 14, 2007	Kitt Peak	Spacewatch	·	1.7 km	MPC · JPL
341078	2007 HK_{75}	—	August 22, 2004	Kitt Peak	Spacewatch	·	1.3 km	MPC · JPL
341079	2007 HK_{83}	—	April 23, 2007	Kitt Peak	Spacewatch	·	1.3 km	MPC · JPL
341080	2007 HT_{83}	—	April 24, 2007	Kitt Peak	Spacewatch	JUN	1.1 km	MPC · JPL
341081	2007 HZ_{83}	—	April 26, 2007	Kitt Peak	Spacewatch	NYS	1.2 km	MPC · JPL
341082	2007 HF_{86}	—	April 24, 2007	Kitt Peak	Spacewatch	EUN	910 m	MPC · JPL
341083	2007 HJ_{87}	—	April 24, 2007	Kitt Peak	Spacewatch	·	1.2 km	MPC · JPL
341084	2007 HD_{90}	—	April 18, 2007	Anderson Mesa	LONEOS	·	2.8 km	MPC · JPL
341085	2007 HD_{92}	—	April 20, 2007	Mount Lemmon	Mount Lemmon Survey	·	1.5 km	MPC · JPL
341086	2007 HJ_{97}	—	April 22, 2007	Mount Lemmon	Mount Lemmon Survey	·	1.5 km	MPC · JPL
341087	2007 HN_{97}	—	April 17, 2007	Moletai	K. Černis, Zdanavicius, J.	·	1.7 km	MPC · JPL
341088	2007 JY_{1}	—	May 7, 2007	Catalina	CSS	·	2.1 km	MPC · JPL
341089	2007 JK_{2}	—	April 24, 2007	Mount Lemmon	Mount Lemmon Survey	EUN	1.4 km	MPC · JPL
341090	2007 JO_{2}	—	May 7, 2007	Lulin	LUSS	·	1.3 km	MPC · JPL
341091	2007 JQ_{2}	—	May 7, 2007	Lulin	LUSS	·	3.2 km	MPC · JPL
341092	2007 JQ_{4}	—	May 7, 2007	Kitt Peak	Spacewatch	·	1.6 km	MPC · JPL
341093	2007 JZ_{4}	—	January 23, 2006	Kitt Peak	Spacewatch	·	1.9 km	MPC · JPL
341094	2007 JK_{9}	—	May 9, 2007	Catalina	CSS	·	1.6 km	MPC · JPL
341095	2007 JY_{9}	—	May 10, 2007	Calvin-Rehoboth	L. A. Molnar	MAR	1.4 km	MPC · JPL
341096	2007 JF_{10}	—	March 26, 2003	Anderson Mesa	LONEOS	MAS	930 m	MPC · JPL
341097	2007 JL_{13}	—	May 9, 2007	Mount Lemmon	Mount Lemmon Survey	·	1.2 km	MPC · JPL
341098	2007 JO_{22}	—	May 10, 2007	Mount Lemmon	Mount Lemmon Survey	·	1.6 km	MPC · JPL
341099	2007 JQ_{24}	—	May 9, 2007	Kitt Peak	Spacewatch	PHO	1.1 km	MPC · JPL
341100	2007 JX_{28}	—	May 10, 2007	Kitt Peak	Spacewatch	·	1.1 km	MPC · JPL

== 341101–341200 ==
back to top

Designation			Discovery			Properties		Ref
Permanent	Provisional	Named after	Date	Site	Discoverer(s)	Category	Diam.	Ref
341101	2007 JH_{30}	—	May 11, 2007	Mount Lemmon	Mount Lemmon Survey	·	2.3 km	MPC · JPL
341102	2007 JT_{36}	—	May 9, 2007	Mount Lemmon	Mount Lemmon Survey	MAS	720 m	MPC · JPL
341103	2007 JW_{40}	—	May 13, 2007	Kitt Peak	Spacewatch	EUN	1.9 km	MPC · JPL
341104	2007 KM_{1}	—	May 17, 2007	Kitt Peak	Spacewatch	·	1.4 km	MPC · JPL
341105	2007 KK_{4}	—	March 26, 2007	Kitt Peak	Spacewatch	·	1.4 km	MPC · JPL
341106	2007 KN_{6}	—	May 25, 2007	Mount Lemmon	Mount Lemmon Survey	·	1.4 km	MPC · JPL
341107	2007 KA_{7}	—	May 23, 2007	Reedy Creek	J. Broughton	·	2.0 km	MPC · JPL
341108	2007 KZ_{7}	—	May 17, 2007	Catalina	CSS	·	2.3 km	MPC · JPL
341109	2007 LQ	—	June 8, 2007	Andrushivka	Andrushivka	·	1.7 km	MPC · JPL
341110	2007 LE_{2}	—	June 7, 2007	Kitt Peak	Spacewatch	·	980 m	MPC · JPL
341111	2007 LY_{2}	—	June 8, 2007	Kitt Peak	Spacewatch	·	2.0 km	MPC · JPL
341112	2007 LS_{3}	—	June 8, 2007	Kitt Peak	Spacewatch	·	1.5 km	MPC · JPL
341113	2007 LT_{5}	—	June 7, 2007	Kitt Peak	Spacewatch	·	1.2 km	MPC · JPL
341114	2007 LV_{6}	—	June 8, 2007	Kitt Peak	Spacewatch	·	1.4 km	MPC · JPL
341115	2007 LV_{11}	—	May 24, 2007	Mount Lemmon	Mount Lemmon Survey	·	1.3 km	MPC · JPL
341116	2007 LK_{12}	—	June 9, 2007	Kitt Peak	Spacewatch	·	1.6 km	MPC · JPL
341117	2007 LJ_{14}	—	June 10, 2007	Kitt Peak	Spacewatch	·	1.2 km	MPC · JPL
341118	2007 LZ_{14}	—	June 12, 2007	La Sagra	OAM	·	2.0 km	MPC · JPL
341119	2007 LM_{15}	—	June 7, 2007	Kitt Peak	Spacewatch	·	1.5 km	MPC · JPL
341120	2007 LX_{17}	—	June 11, 2007	Kitt Peak	Spacewatch	V	780 m	MPC · JPL
341121	2007 LS_{20}	—	June 10, 2007	Kitt Peak	Spacewatch	·	1.5 km	MPC · JPL
341122	2007 LF_{28}	—	June 15, 2007	Kitt Peak	Spacewatch	·	1.7 km	MPC · JPL
341123	2007 LO_{28}	—	June 15, 2007	Kitt Peak	Spacewatch	·	1.8 km	MPC · JPL
341124	2007 LR_{33}	—	June 15, 2007	Kitt Peak	Spacewatch	·	2.7 km	MPC · JPL
341125	2007 MC	—	June 16, 2007	Tiki	S. F. Hönig, Teamo, N.	·	1.7 km	MPC · JPL
341126	2007 ME	—	June 16, 2007	Tiki	S. F. Hönig, Teamo, N.	·	2.3 km	MPC · JPL
341127	2007 MM	—	June 16, 2007	Kitt Peak	Spacewatch	MRX	1.3 km	MPC · JPL
341128	2007 MZ_{1}	—	June 18, 2007	Kitt Peak	Spacewatch	·	1.9 km	MPC · JPL
341129	2007 MX_{4}	—	June 17, 2007	Kitt Peak	Spacewatch	EUN	1.4 km	MPC · JPL
341130	2007 MF_{5}	—	June 17, 2007	Kitt Peak	Spacewatch	·	1.8 km	MPC · JPL
341131	2007 MW_{5}	—	June 17, 2007	Kitt Peak	Spacewatch	·	1.8 km	MPC · JPL
341132	2007 MD_{12}	—	June 21, 2007	Mount Lemmon	Mount Lemmon Survey	·	1.9 km	MPC · JPL
341133	2007 ME_{13}	—	June 22, 2007	Kitt Peak	Spacewatch	EUN	1.4 km	MPC · JPL
341134	2007 MK_{20}	—	June 23, 2007	Kitt Peak	Spacewatch	·	2.1 km	MPC · JPL
341135	2007 OE	—	July 16, 2007	La Sagra	OAM	·	3.5 km	MPC · JPL
341136	2007 OW_{4}	—	July 21, 2007	Lulin	LUSS	·	2.3 km	MPC · JPL
341137	2007 OW_{7}	—	July 27, 2007	Dauban	Chante-Perdrix	·	2.9 km	MPC · JPL
341138	2007 OX_{10}	—	July 18, 2007	Mount Lemmon	Mount Lemmon Survey	·	3.3 km	MPC · JPL
341139	2007 PB_{5}	—	August 5, 2007	Socorro	LINEAR	·	2.0 km	MPC · JPL
341140	2007 PL_{5}	—	August 6, 2007	Socorro	LINEAR	·	3.1 km	MPC · JPL
341141	2007 PR_{6}	—	August 9, 2007	Tiki	S. F. Hönig, Teamo, N.	GAL	2.3 km	MPC · JPL
341142	2007 PN_{10}	—	August 9, 2007	Socorro	LINEAR	·	2.5 km	MPC · JPL
341143	2007 PM_{14}	—	August 8, 2007	Socorro	LINEAR	·	2.5 km	MPC · JPL
341144	2007 PA_{15}	—	August 8, 2007	Socorro	LINEAR	·	3.4 km	MPC · JPL
341145	2007 PR_{15}	—	August 8, 2007	Socorro	LINEAR	DOR	3.9 km	MPC · JPL
341146	2007 PV_{16}	—	August 8, 2007	Socorro	LINEAR	·	2.8 km	MPC · JPL
341147	2007 PV_{19}	—	August 9, 2007	Kitt Peak	Spacewatch	·	1.9 km	MPC · JPL
341148	2007 PK_{28}	—	August 14, 2007	Socorro	LINEAR	·	2.5 km	MPC · JPL
341149	2007 PL_{28}	—	August 15, 2007	Altschwendt	W. Ries	·	2.0 km	MPC · JPL
341150	2007 PA_{29}	—	August 14, 2007	Siding Spring	SSS	BRA	2.2 km	MPC · JPL
341151	2007 PZ_{29}	—	August 8, 2007	Socorro	LINEAR	EUN	1.9 km	MPC · JPL
341152	2007 PH_{30}	—	April 2, 2006	Kitt Peak	Spacewatch	·	2.2 km	MPC · JPL
341153	2007 PE_{31}	—	August 5, 2007	Socorro	LINEAR	(18466)	3.3 km	MPC · JPL
341154	2007 PJ_{31}	—	August 6, 2007	Dauban	Chante-Perdrix	DOR	2.9 km	MPC · JPL
341155	2007 PF_{36}	—	October 1, 2003	Anderson Mesa	LONEOS	·	2.7 km	MPC · JPL
341156	2007 PR_{40}	—	August 9, 2007	Socorro	LINEAR	BRA	1.8 km	MPC · JPL
341157	2007 PZ_{40}	—	August 13, 2007	Socorro	LINEAR	·	2.1 km	MPC · JPL
341158	2007 PD_{45}	—	August 10, 2007	Kitt Peak	Spacewatch	KOR	1.4 km	MPC · JPL
341159	2007 PG_{45}	—	August 10, 2007	Kitt Peak	Spacewatch	KOR	1.4 km	MPC · JPL
341160	2007 PW_{46}	—	August 14, 2007	Siding Spring	SSS	·	3.0 km	MPC · JPL
341161	2007 PE_{47}	—	August 10, 2007	Kitt Peak	Spacewatch	·	2.3 km	MPC · JPL
341162	2007 PW_{48}	—	August 12, 2007	Purple Mountain	PMO NEO Survey Program	HOF	3.0 km	MPC · JPL
341163	2007 PM_{49}	—	August 10, 2007	Kitt Peak	Spacewatch	EUN	1.3 km	MPC · JPL
341164	2007 QY_{9}	—	August 22, 2007	Socorro	LINEAR	MRX	1.5 km	MPC · JPL
341165	2007 QO_{13}	—	August 24, 2007	Kitt Peak	Spacewatch	·	1.9 km	MPC · JPL
341166	2007 QW_{13}	—	August 24, 2007	Kitt Peak	Spacewatch	KOR	1.4 km	MPC · JPL
341167	2007 QA_{14}	—	August 24, 2007	Kitt Peak	Spacewatch	·	2.1 km	MPC · JPL
341168	2007 QC_{14}	—	August 24, 2007	Kitt Peak	Spacewatch	·	2.0 km	MPC · JPL
341169	2007 QD_{14}	—	August 24, 2007	Kitt Peak	Spacewatch	·	1.9 km	MPC · JPL
341170	2007 QE_{14}	—	August 24, 2007	Kitt Peak	Spacewatch	·	1.9 km	MPC · JPL
341171	2007 QG_{16}	—	August 23, 2007	Kitt Peak	Spacewatch	·	2.3 km	MPC · JPL
341172	2007 QW_{16}	—	August 23, 2007	Kitt Peak	Spacewatch	·	2.4 km	MPC · JPL
341173	2007 RX	—	September 3, 2007	Eskridge	G. Hug	·	2.8 km	MPC · JPL
341174	2007 RD_{8}	—	September 5, 2007	Marly	P. Kocher	INA	3.2 km	MPC · JPL
341175	2007 RP_{8}	—	September 8, 2007	Eskridge	G. Hug	·	2.7 km	MPC · JPL
341176	2007 RO_{10}	—	September 3, 2007	Catalina	CSS	·	3.2 km	MPC · JPL
341177	2007 RQ_{10}	—	September 3, 2007	Catalina	CSS	·	3.0 km	MPC · JPL
341178	2007 RG_{12}	—	September 11, 2007	Eskridge	G. Hug	·	2.2 km	MPC · JPL
341179	2007 RT_{14}	—	September 11, 2007	Dauban	Chante-Perdrix	H	630 m	MPC · JPL
341180	2007 RY_{16}	—	September 13, 2007	Eskridge	G. Hug	PAD	1.9 km	MPC · JPL
341181	2007 RW_{18}	—	September 12, 2007	Dauban	Chante-Perdrix	·	3.5 km	MPC · JPL
341182	2007 RW_{20}	—	September 3, 2007	Catalina	CSS	·	1.9 km	MPC · JPL
341183	2007 RU_{21}	—	September 3, 2007	Catalina	CSS	·	2.0 km	MPC · JPL
341184	2007 RJ_{28}	—	September 4, 2007	Catalina	CSS	·	2.3 km	MPC · JPL
341185	2007 RX_{32}	—	September 5, 2007	Catalina	CSS	·	2.9 km	MPC · JPL
341186	2007 RC_{43}	—	September 9, 2007	Kitt Peak	Spacewatch	·	2.7 km	MPC · JPL
341187	2007 RZ_{47}	—	September 9, 2007	Mount Lemmon	Mount Lemmon Survey	AST	1.6 km	MPC · JPL
341188	2007 RJ_{50}	—	September 9, 2007	Kitt Peak	Spacewatch	·	1.8 km	MPC · JPL
341189	2007 RK_{51}	—	September 9, 2007	Kitt Peak	Spacewatch	·	3.3 km	MPC · JPL
341190	2007 RL_{52}	—	September 9, 2007	Kitt Peak	Spacewatch	·	2.0 km	MPC · JPL
341191	2007 RO_{52}	—	September 9, 2007	Kitt Peak	Spacewatch	EOS	2.4 km	MPC · JPL
341192	2007 RB_{53}	—	September 9, 2007	Kitt Peak	Spacewatch	·	2.4 km	MPC · JPL
341193	2007 RG_{60}	—	September 10, 2007	Catalina	CSS	·	2.6 km	MPC · JPL
341194	2007 RT_{63}	—	September 10, 2007	Mount Lemmon	Mount Lemmon Survey	BRA	1.5 km	MPC · JPL
341195	2007 RO_{65}	—	September 10, 2007	Mount Lemmon	Mount Lemmon Survey	·	1.9 km	MPC · JPL
341196	2007 RH_{67}	—	September 10, 2007	Mount Lemmon	Mount Lemmon Survey	·	1.4 km	MPC · JPL
341197	2007 RS_{70}	—	September 10, 2007	Kitt Peak	Spacewatch	·	2.9 km	MPC · JPL
341198	2007 RJ_{71}	—	September 10, 2007	Kitt Peak	Spacewatch	·	2.5 km	MPC · JPL
341199	2007 RH_{72}	—	September 10, 2007	Kitt Peak	Spacewatch	·	1.9 km	MPC · JPL
341200	2007 RF_{80}	—	September 10, 2007	Mount Lemmon	Mount Lemmon Survey	KOR	1.3 km	MPC · JPL

== 341201–341300 ==
back to top

Designation			Discovery			Properties		Ref
Permanent	Provisional	Named after	Date	Site	Discoverer(s)	Category	Diam.	Ref
341201	2007 RV_{80}	—	September 10, 2007	Mount Lemmon	Mount Lemmon Survey	GEF	1.6 km	MPC · JPL
341202	2007 RP_{83}	—	September 10, 2007	Mount Lemmon	Mount Lemmon Survey	·	2.5 km	MPC · JPL
341203	2007 RC_{91}	—	September 10, 2007	Mount Lemmon	Mount Lemmon Survey	·	4.1 km	MPC · JPL
341204	2007 RX_{94}	—	September 10, 2007	Kitt Peak	Spacewatch	·	2.4 km	MPC · JPL
341205	2007 RO_{101}	—	September 11, 2007	Mount Lemmon	Mount Lemmon Survey	AGN	1.5 km	MPC · JPL
341206	2007 RD_{109}	—	September 11, 2007	Kitt Peak	Spacewatch	·	2.4 km	MPC · JPL
341207	2007 RX_{110}	—	September 11, 2007	Mount Lemmon	Mount Lemmon Survey	·	2.0 km	MPC · JPL
341208	2007 RV_{111}	—	September 11, 2007	Kitt Peak	Spacewatch	·	1.3 km	MPC · JPL
341209	2007 RF_{116}	—	September 11, 2007	Kitt Peak	Spacewatch	HOF	2.5 km	MPC · JPL
341210	2007 RQ_{117}	—	September 11, 2007	Kitt Peak	Spacewatch	AGN	1.2 km	MPC · JPL
341211	2007 RW_{118}	—	September 11, 2007	Kitt Peak	Spacewatch	·	2.4 km	MPC · JPL
341212	2007 RY_{122}	—	September 12, 2007	Mount Lemmon	Mount Lemmon Survey	·	2.6 km	MPC · JPL
341213	2007 RQ_{124}	—	September 12, 2007	Mount Lemmon	Mount Lemmon Survey	·	2.7 km	MPC · JPL
341214	2007 RT_{126}	—	September 12, 2007	Mount Lemmon	Mount Lemmon Survey	·	2.1 km	MPC · JPL
341215	2007 RM_{127}	—	September 12, 2007	Mount Lemmon	Mount Lemmon Survey	·	2.9 km	MPC · JPL
341216	2007 RB_{128}	—	September 12, 2007	Mount Lemmon	Mount Lemmon Survey	KOR	1.4 km	MPC · JPL
341217	2007 RX_{128}	—	September 12, 2007	Mount Lemmon	Mount Lemmon Survey	EOS	2.0 km	MPC · JPL
341218	2007 RG_{129}	—	September 12, 2007	Mount Lemmon	Mount Lemmon Survey	·	2.2 km	MPC · JPL
341219	2007 RV_{130}	—	September 12, 2007	Mount Lemmon	Mount Lemmon Survey	·	2.3 km	MPC · JPL
341220	2007 RV_{133}	—	September 10, 2007	Kitt Peak	Spacewatch	·	3.7 km	MPC · JPL
341221	2007 RB_{135}	—	September 12, 2007	Mount Lemmon	Mount Lemmon Survey	KOR	1.2 km	MPC · JPL
341222	2007 RT_{138}	—	September 15, 2007	Lulin	LUSS	·	3.0 km	MPC · JPL
341223	2007 RF_{142}	—	September 13, 2007	Socorro	LINEAR	H	720 m	MPC · JPL
341224	2007 RH_{142}	—	September 13, 2007	Socorro	LINEAR	·	2.7 km	MPC · JPL
341225	2007 RB_{143}	—	September 14, 2007	Socorro	LINEAR	·	2.2 km	MPC · JPL
341226	2007 RW_{143}	—	September 14, 2007	Socorro	LINEAR	·	2.9 km	MPC · JPL
341227	2007 RM_{146}	—	September 10, 2007	Kitt Peak	Spacewatch	·	4.2 km	MPC · JPL
341228	2007 RK_{150}	—	September 14, 2007	Catalina	CSS	·	2.7 km	MPC · JPL
341229	2007 RJ_{153}	—	May 4, 2006	Mount Lemmon	Mount Lemmon Survey	·	2.0 km	MPC · JPL
341230	2007 RO_{153}	—	September 10, 2007	Kitt Peak	Spacewatch	·	1.5 km	MPC · JPL
341231	2007 RG_{156}	—	September 10, 2007	Mount Lemmon	Mount Lemmon Survey	AGN	1.1 km	MPC · JPL
341232	2007 RY_{158}	—	September 12, 2007	Mount Lemmon	Mount Lemmon Survey	·	2.0 km	MPC · JPL
341233	2007 RJ_{162}	—	September 13, 2007	Goodricke-Pigott	R. A. Tucker	·	2.1 km	MPC · JPL
341234	2007 RD_{169}	—	September 10, 2007	Kitt Peak	Spacewatch	·	2.3 km	MPC · JPL
341235	2007 RP_{169}	—	September 10, 2007	Kitt Peak	Spacewatch	·	2.2 km	MPC · JPL
341236	2007 RM_{171}	—	September 10, 2007	Kitt Peak	Spacewatch	·	2.0 km	MPC · JPL
341237	2007 RO_{171}	—	September 10, 2007	Kitt Peak	Spacewatch	·	2.2 km	MPC · JPL
341238	2007 RQ_{174}	—	September 10, 2007	Kitt Peak	Spacewatch	·	2.4 km	MPC · JPL
341239	2007 RW_{174}	—	September 10, 2007	Kitt Peak	Spacewatch	·	1.9 km	MPC · JPL
341240	2007 RB_{176}	—	September 8, 2007	Catalina	CSS	·	3.3 km	MPC · JPL
341241	2007 RD_{176}	—	September 9, 2007	Mount Lemmon	Mount Lemmon Survey	AGN	1.4 km	MPC · JPL
341242	2007 RH_{178}	—	September 10, 2007	Kitt Peak	Spacewatch	·	3.4 km	MPC · JPL
341243	2007 RJ_{179}	—	September 10, 2007	Mount Lemmon	Mount Lemmon Survey	·	3.6 km	MPC · JPL
341244	2007 RD_{189}	—	September 10, 2007	Catalina	CSS	·	2.7 km	MPC · JPL
341245	2007 RG_{191}	—	September 11, 2007	Kitt Peak	Spacewatch	·	1.4 km	MPC · JPL
341246	2007 RP_{202}	—	September 13, 2007	Kitt Peak	Spacewatch	·	2.5 km	MPC · JPL
341247	2007 RP_{203}	—	September 9, 2007	Mount Lemmon	Mount Lemmon Survey	·	2.3 km	MPC · JPL
341248	2007 RQ_{203}	—	September 13, 2007	Kitt Peak	Spacewatch	·	1.8 km	MPC · JPL
341249	2007 RD_{205}	—	September 9, 2007	Kitt Peak	Spacewatch	·	2.2 km	MPC · JPL
341250	2007 RX_{206}	—	September 10, 2007	Kitt Peak	Spacewatch	KOR	1.5 km	MPC · JPL
341251	2007 RR_{208}	—	September 10, 2007	Kitt Peak	Spacewatch	KOR	1.8 km	MPC · JPL
341252	2007 RP_{212}	—	September 11, 2007	Lulin	LUSS	·	4.4 km	MPC · JPL
341253	2007 RS_{214}	—	September 12, 2007	Kitt Peak	Spacewatch	HOF	2.5 km	MPC · JPL
341254	2007 RC_{215}	—	September 12, 2007	Kitt Peak	Spacewatch	AGN	1.3 km	MPC · JPL
341255	2007 RM_{216}	—	September 13, 2007	Catalina	CSS	·	2.2 km	MPC · JPL
341256	2007 RB_{228}	—	September 10, 2007	Mount Lemmon	Mount Lemmon Survey	·	2.6 km	MPC · JPL
341257	2007 RD_{230}	—	September 11, 2007	Kitt Peak	Spacewatch	H	590 m	MPC · JPL
341258	2007 RM_{233}	—	September 12, 2007	Catalina	CSS	·	2.8 km	MPC · JPL
341259	2007 RR_{233}	—	September 12, 2007	Catalina	CSS	·	2.6 km	MPC · JPL
341260	2007 RA_{234}	—	September 12, 2007	Catalina	CSS	·	3.7 km	MPC · JPL
341261	2007 RS_{235}	—	September 12, 2007	Mount Lemmon	Mount Lemmon Survey	·	2.4 km	MPC · JPL
341262	2007 RJ_{246}	—	September 12, 2007	Mount Lemmon	Mount Lemmon Survey	·	2.2 km	MPC · JPL
341263	2007 RR_{249}	—	September 13, 2007	Mount Lemmon	Mount Lemmon Survey	·	1.9 km	MPC · JPL
341264	2007 RF_{250}	—	September 13, 2007	Kitt Peak	Spacewatch	·	3.2 km	MPC · JPL
341265	2007 RJ_{251}	—	September 13, 2007	Kitt Peak	Spacewatch	PAD	1.8 km	MPC · JPL
341266	2007 RL_{254}	—	September 14, 2007	Kitt Peak	Spacewatch	·	2.3 km	MPC · JPL
341267	2007 RR_{254}	—	September 14, 2007	Kitt Peak	Spacewatch	·	2.2 km	MPC · JPL
341268	2007 RJ_{258}	—	September 14, 2007	Kitt Peak	Spacewatch	·	1.7 km	MPC · JPL
341269	2007 RC_{261}	—	September 14, 2007	Kitt Peak	Spacewatch	·	2.1 km	MPC · JPL
341270	2007 RE_{264}	—	September 15, 2007	Mount Lemmon	Mount Lemmon Survey	EOS	2.5 km	MPC · JPL
341271	2007 RL_{271}	—	September 15, 2007	Mount Lemmon	Mount Lemmon Survey	·	3.4 km	MPC · JPL
341272	2007 RS_{271}	—	September 15, 2007	Mount Lemmon	Mount Lemmon Survey	·	2.9 km	MPC · JPL
341273	2007 RY_{280}	—	September 13, 2007	Catalina	CSS	·	3.2 km	MPC · JPL
341274	2007 RD_{281}	—	September 13, 2007	Catalina	CSS	·	3.8 km	MPC · JPL
341275	2007 RG_{283}	—	September 15, 2007	Palomar Mountain	M. E. Schwamb, M. E. Brown, D. Rabinowitz	centaur	111 km	MPC · JPL
341276	2007 RD_{284}	—	September 9, 2007	Kitt Peak	Spacewatch	·	2.5 km	MPC · JPL
341277	2007 RG_{284}	—	September 10, 2007	Kitt Peak	Spacewatch	·	2.4 km	MPC · JPL
341278	2007 RL_{284}	—	September 11, 2007	Mount Lemmon	Mount Lemmon Survey	KOR	1.3 km	MPC · JPL
341279	2007 RV_{284}	—	September 12, 2007	Mount Lemmon	Mount Lemmon Survey	AGN	1.2 km	MPC · JPL
341280	2007 RA_{285}	—	September 12, 2007	Mount Lemmon	Mount Lemmon Survey	·	1.8 km	MPC · JPL
341281	2007 RC_{285}	—	September 12, 2007	Mount Lemmon	Mount Lemmon Survey	·	3.2 km	MPC · JPL
341282	2007 RX_{285}	—	September 14, 2007	Mount Lemmon	Mount Lemmon Survey	·	3.2 km	MPC · JPL
341283	2007 RA_{290}	—	September 14, 2007	Mount Lemmon	Mount Lemmon Survey	·	3.1 km	MPC · JPL
341284	2007 RA_{291}	—	September 10, 2007	Mount Lemmon	Mount Lemmon Survey	·	3.0 km	MPC · JPL
341285	2007 RY_{292}	—	September 12, 2007	Mount Lemmon	Mount Lemmon Survey	·	2.7 km	MPC · JPL
341286	2007 RN_{293}	—	September 13, 2007	Mount Lemmon	Mount Lemmon Survey	·	2.1 km	MPC · JPL
341287	2007 RS_{293}	—	September 13, 2007	Mount Lemmon	Mount Lemmon Survey	AGN	1.6 km	MPC · JPL
341288	2007 RA_{294}	—	September 13, 2007	Kitt Peak	Spacewatch	·	2.8 km	MPC · JPL
341289	2007 RC_{294}	—	September 13, 2007	Kitt Peak	Spacewatch	·	2.2 km	MPC · JPL
341290	2007 RE_{294}	—	September 13, 2007	Kitt Peak	Spacewatch	·	1.8 km	MPC · JPL
341291	2007 RD_{296}	—	September 12, 2007	Mount Lemmon	Mount Lemmon Survey	·	4.2 km	MPC · JPL
341292	2007 RW_{298}	—	September 11, 2007	Kitt Peak	Spacewatch	·	1.8 km	MPC · JPL
341293	2007 RJ_{302}	—	September 14, 2007	Mount Lemmon	Mount Lemmon Survey	·	3.6 km	MPC · JPL
341294	2007 RK_{308}	—	September 11, 2007	Mount Lemmon	Mount Lemmon Survey	KOR	1.4 km	MPC · JPL
341295	2007 RE_{311}	—	September 5, 2007	Catalina	CSS	·	2.5 km	MPC · JPL
341296	2007 RQ_{316}	—	September 9, 2007	Mount Lemmon	Mount Lemmon Survey	·	1.9 km	MPC · JPL
341297	2007 RB_{317}	—	September 10, 2007	Kitt Peak	Spacewatch	·	1.9 km	MPC · JPL
341298	2007 RP_{317}	—	September 10, 2007	Mount Lemmon	Mount Lemmon Survey	KOR	1.5 km	MPC · JPL
341299	2007 RQ_{317}	—	September 10, 2007	Mount Lemmon	Mount Lemmon Survey	·	2.8 km	MPC · JPL
341300	2007 RX_{317}	—	September 10, 2007	Catalina	CSS	·	2.6 km	MPC · JPL

== 341301–341400 ==
back to top

Designation			Discovery			Properties		Ref
Permanent	Provisional	Named after	Date	Site	Discoverer(s)	Category	Diam.	Ref
341301	2007 RJ_{320}	—	September 13, 2007	Catalina	CSS	HYG	5.4 km	MPC · JPL
341302	2007 RA_{322}	—	September 10, 2007	Mount Lemmon	Mount Lemmon Survey	KOR	1.3 km	MPC · JPL
341303	2007 RF_{323}	—	September 15, 2007	Mount Lemmon	Mount Lemmon Survey	KOR	1.5 km	MPC · JPL
341304	2007 RF_{324}	—	September 14, 2007	Kitt Peak	Spacewatch	KOR	1.7 km	MPC · JPL
341305	2007 RL_{324}	—	September 15, 2007	Mount Lemmon	Mount Lemmon Survey	EOS	2.3 km	MPC · JPL
341306	2007 RQ_{324}	—	September 10, 2007	Mount Lemmon	Mount Lemmon Survey	EOS	2.1 km	MPC · JPL
341307	2007 RZ_{324}	—	September 13, 2007	Mount Lemmon	Mount Lemmon Survey	KOR	1.4 km	MPC · JPL
341308	2007 SN_{1}	—	September 18, 2007	Goodricke-Pigott	R. A. Tucker	H	860 m	MPC · JPL
341309	2007 SW_{3}	—	September 16, 2007	Socorro	LINEAR	·	2.9 km	MPC · JPL
341310	2007 ST_{7}	—	September 18, 2007	Kitt Peak	Spacewatch	KOR	2.1 km	MPC · JPL
341311	2007 SL_{15}	—	September 25, 2007	Mount Lemmon	Mount Lemmon Survey	H	670 m	MPC · JPL
341312	2007 ST_{19}	—	September 24, 2007	Kitt Peak	Spacewatch	·	1.5 km	MPC · JPL
341313	2007 SW_{19}	—	September 26, 2007	Mount Lemmon	Mount Lemmon Survey	·	3.6 km	MPC · JPL
341314	2007 SC_{20}	—	September 19, 2007	Catalina	CSS	·	3.2 km	MPC · JPL
341315	2007 SB_{21}	—	September 18, 2007	Kitt Peak	Spacewatch	EOS	2.3 km	MPC · JPL
341316	2007 SR_{21}	—	September 18, 2007	Socorro	LINEAR	·	2.9 km	MPC · JPL
341317 Weisshaidinger	2007 TE	Weisshaidinger	October 1, 2007	Gaisberg	Gierlinger, R.	·	2.5 km	MPC · JPL
341318	2007 TQ_{1}	—	October 4, 2007	Kitt Peak	Spacewatch	·	2.1 km	MPC · JPL
341319	2007 TL_{4}	—	October 6, 2007	7300	W. K. Y. Yeung	·	2.0 km	MPC · JPL
341320	2007 TP_{4}	—	October 6, 2007	7300	W. K. Y. Yeung	·	2.1 km	MPC · JPL
341321	2007 TK_{14}	—	October 7, 2007	Altschwendt	W. Ries	·	2.1 km	MPC · JPL
341322	2007 TM_{14}	—	October 7, 2007	Altschwendt	W. Ries	KOR	1.8 km	MPC · JPL
341323	2007 TO_{16}	—	October 8, 2007	Socorro	LINEAR	H	460 m	MPC · JPL
341324	2007 TA_{17}	—	October 7, 2007	Calvin-Rehoboth	Calvin College	·	3.3 km	MPC · JPL
341325	2007 TN_{20}	—	October 8, 2007	Socorro	LINEAR	·	2.2 km	MPC · JPL
341326	2007 TD_{23}	—	October 6, 2007	Bisei SG Center	BATTeRS	·	1.9 km	MPC · JPL
341327	2007 TF_{26}	—	October 4, 2007	Mount Lemmon	Mount Lemmon Survey	KOR	1.4 km	MPC · JPL
341328	2007 TD_{28}	—	October 4, 2007	Kitt Peak	Spacewatch	·	2.1 km	MPC · JPL
341329	2007 TZ_{30}	—	September 12, 2007	Mount Lemmon	Mount Lemmon Survey	·	3.9 km	MPC · JPL
341330	2007 TK_{33}	—	October 6, 2007	Kitt Peak	Spacewatch	·	2.2 km	MPC · JPL
341331	2007 TA_{34}	—	October 6, 2007	Kitt Peak	Spacewatch	·	3.1 km	MPC · JPL
341332	2007 TD_{34}	—	October 6, 2007	Kitt Peak	Spacewatch	·	2.7 km	MPC · JPL
341333	2007 TV_{34}	—	October 6, 2007	Kitt Peak	Spacewatch	EOS	2.6 km	MPC · JPL
341334	2007 TW_{35}	—	October 7, 2007	Mount Lemmon	Mount Lemmon Survey	·	2.4 km	MPC · JPL
341335	2007 TZ_{35}	—	October 9, 2007	Kitt Peak	Spacewatch	·	2.1 km	MPC · JPL
341336	2007 TU_{36}	—	October 4, 2007	Kitt Peak	Spacewatch	·	1.6 km	MPC · JPL
341337	2007 TY_{37}	—	October 4, 2007	Catalina	CSS	·	3.0 km	MPC · JPL
341338	2007 TC_{39}	—	October 6, 2007	Kitt Peak	Spacewatch	EOS	2.2 km	MPC · JPL
341339	2007 TW_{40}	—	October 6, 2007	Kitt Peak	Spacewatch	·	5.9 km	MPC · JPL
341340	2007 TZ_{40}	—	October 6, 2007	Kitt Peak	Spacewatch	EMA	4.1 km	MPC · JPL
341341	2007 TG_{43}	—	October 7, 2007	Mount Lemmon	Mount Lemmon Survey	·	2.7 km	MPC · JPL
341342	2007 TQ_{44}	—	October 7, 2007	Mount Lemmon	Mount Lemmon Survey	EOS	2.2 km	MPC · JPL
341343	2007 TD_{45}	—	October 7, 2007	Mount Lemmon	Mount Lemmon Survey	·	2.3 km	MPC · JPL
341344	2007 TM_{46}	—	October 8, 2007	Mount Lemmon	Mount Lemmon Survey	·	1.9 km	MPC · JPL
341345	2007 TF_{47}	—	October 4, 2007	Kitt Peak	Spacewatch	·	2.9 km	MPC · JPL
341346	2007 TN_{47}	—	October 4, 2007	Kitt Peak	Spacewatch	·	2.9 km	MPC · JPL
341347	2007 TW_{49}	—	October 4, 2007	Kitt Peak	Spacewatch	·	3.5 km	MPC · JPL
341348	2007 TC_{51}	—	October 4, 2007	Kitt Peak	Spacewatch	·	1.7 km	MPC · JPL
341349	2007 TR_{51}	—	October 4, 2007	Kitt Peak	Spacewatch	·	3.7 km	MPC · JPL
341350	2007 TK_{53}	—	October 4, 2007	Kitt Peak	Spacewatch	KOR	1.4 km	MPC · JPL
341351	2007 TZ_{53}	—	October 4, 2007	Kitt Peak	Spacewatch	·	2.8 km	MPC · JPL
341352	2007 TT_{58}	—	October 5, 2007	Kitt Peak	Spacewatch	·	2.2 km	MPC · JPL
341353	2007 TJ_{59}	—	October 5, 2007	Kitt Peak	Spacewatch	AGN	1.3 km	MPC · JPL
341354	2007 TS_{59}	—	October 5, 2007	Kitt Peak	Spacewatch	·	1.9 km	MPC · JPL
341355	2007 TF_{60}	—	October 5, 2007	Kitt Peak	Spacewatch	·	3.0 km	MPC · JPL
341356	2007 TW_{62}	—	October 7, 2007	Mount Lemmon	Mount Lemmon Survey	·	3.6 km	MPC · JPL
341357	2007 TZ_{64}	—	October 7, 2007	Mount Lemmon	Mount Lemmon Survey	·	2.1 km	MPC · JPL
341358	2007 TS_{66}	—	October 11, 2007	La Sagra	OAM	·	3.1 km	MPC · JPL
341359 Gregneumann	2007 TV_{69}	Gregneumann	October 14, 2007	Front Royal	Skillman, D. R.	EOS	1.9 km	MPC · JPL
341360	2007 TB_{71}	—	October 13, 2007	Calvin-Rehoboth	Calvin College	EOS	2.1 km	MPC · JPL
341361 Hughespack	2007 TP_{73}	Hughespack	October 7, 2007	Charleston	R. Holmes	AGN	1.3 km	MPC · JPL
341362	2007 TD_{78}	—	October 5, 2007	Kitt Peak	Spacewatch	EOS	2.4 km	MPC · JPL
341363	2007 TU_{84}	—	October 8, 2007	Kitt Peak	Spacewatch	·	3.3 km	MPC · JPL
341364	2007 TE_{86}	—	October 8, 2007	Mount Lemmon	Mount Lemmon Survey	·	1.8 km	MPC · JPL
341365	2007 TB_{87}	—	October 8, 2007	Mount Lemmon	Mount Lemmon Survey	KOR	1.5 km	MPC · JPL
341366	2007 TJ_{93}	—	October 6, 2007	Kitt Peak	Spacewatch	·	3.7 km	MPC · JPL
341367	2007 TQ_{93}	—	September 12, 2007	Mount Lemmon	Mount Lemmon Survey	·	3.4 km	MPC · JPL
341368	2007 TT_{94}	—	October 7, 2007	Catalina	CSS	·	4.4 km	MPC · JPL
341369	2007 TU_{95}	—	October 7, 2007	Kitt Peak	Spacewatch	EOS	2.4 km	MPC · JPL
341370	2007 TC_{101}	—	October 8, 2007	Mount Lemmon	Mount Lemmon Survey	·	1.6 km	MPC · JPL
341371	2007 TD_{101}	—	October 8, 2007	Mount Lemmon	Mount Lemmon Survey	EOS	2.4 km	MPC · JPL
341372	2007 TA_{107}	—	October 4, 2007	Kitt Peak	Spacewatch	·	1.4 km	MPC · JPL
341373	2007 TR_{107}	—	September 13, 2007	Mount Lemmon	Mount Lemmon Survey	·	1.8 km	MPC · JPL
341374	2007 TB_{108}	—	October 6, 2007	La Cañada	Lacruz, J.	·	1.9 km	MPC · JPL
341375	2007 TW_{108}	—	October 7, 2007	Catalina	CSS	·	3.3 km	MPC · JPL
341376	2007 TD_{113}	—	October 8, 2007	Catalina	CSS	NAE	4.2 km	MPC · JPL
341377	2007 TX_{115}	—	October 8, 2007	Mount Lemmon	Mount Lemmon Survey	·	4.3 km	MPC · JPL
341378	2007 TH_{119}	—	October 9, 2007	Kitt Peak	Spacewatch	EOS	2.6 km	MPC · JPL
341379	2007 TW_{120}	—	October 4, 2007	Kitt Peak	Spacewatch	·	1.9 km	MPC · JPL
341380	2007 TZ_{120}	—	October 5, 2007	Kitt Peak	Spacewatch	·	2.2 km	MPC · JPL
341381	2007 TJ_{121}	—	October 5, 2007	Kitt Peak	Spacewatch	·	2.5 km	MPC · JPL
341382	2007 TA_{123}	—	October 6, 2007	Kitt Peak	Spacewatch	THM	3.0 km	MPC · JPL
341383	2007 TL_{123}	—	October 6, 2007	Kitt Peak	Spacewatch	·	2.6 km	MPC · JPL
341384	2007 TB_{124}	—	October 6, 2007	Kitt Peak	Spacewatch	·	3.0 km	MPC · JPL
341385	2007 TH_{126}	—	October 6, 2007	Kitt Peak	Spacewatch	·	1.9 km	MPC · JPL
341386	2007 TS_{126}	—	October 6, 2007	Kitt Peak	Spacewatch	·	3.7 km	MPC · JPL
341387	2007 TA_{127}	—	October 6, 2007	Kitt Peak	Spacewatch	·	3.4 km	MPC · JPL
341388	2007 TO_{128}	—	October 6, 2007	Kitt Peak	Spacewatch	·	2.1 km	MPC · JPL
341389	2007 TP_{129}	—	October 6, 2007	Kitt Peak	Spacewatch	·	2.4 km	MPC · JPL
341390	2007 TY_{130}	—	October 7, 2007	Kitt Peak	Spacewatch	·	3.5 km	MPC · JPL
341391	2007 TV_{131}	—	October 7, 2007	Mount Lemmon	Mount Lemmon Survey	·	2.2 km	MPC · JPL
341392	2007 TA_{134}	—	October 7, 2007	Mount Lemmon	Mount Lemmon Survey	·	2.9 km	MPC · JPL
341393	2007 TN_{137}	—	October 8, 2007	Catalina	CSS	·	4.0 km	MPC · JPL
341394	2007 TO_{138}	—	October 9, 2007	Catalina	CSS	·	2.2 km	MPC · JPL
341395	2007 TB_{140}	—	October 9, 2007	Catalina	CSS	TIR	3.8 km	MPC · JPL
341396	2007 TY_{140}	—	October 9, 2007	Mount Lemmon	Mount Lemmon Survey	·	3.0 km	MPC · JPL
341397	2007 TB_{144}	—	October 6, 2007	Socorro	LINEAR	HOF	3.6 km	MPC · JPL
341398	2007 TC_{151}	—	October 9, 2007	Socorro	LINEAR	·	2.5 km	MPC · JPL
341399	2007 TP_{152}	—	October 9, 2007	Socorro	LINEAR	·	3.2 km	MPC · JPL
341400	2007 TD_{158}	—	October 9, 2007	Socorro	LINEAR	·	3.8 km	MPC · JPL

== 341401–341500 ==
back to top

Designation			Discovery			Properties		Ref
Permanent	Provisional	Named after	Date	Site	Discoverer(s)	Category	Diam.	Ref
341401	2007 TE_{158}	—	October 9, 2007	Socorro	LINEAR	·	2.6 km	MPC · JPL
341402	2007 TH_{161}	—	October 11, 2007	Socorro	LINEAR	·	3.7 km	MPC · JPL
341403	2007 TP_{161}	—	October 11, 2007	Socorro	LINEAR	·	2.2 km	MPC · JPL
341404	2007 TS_{162}	—	May 1, 2006	Catalina	CSS	·	3.1 km	MPC · JPL
341405	2007 TZ_{162}	—	October 11, 2007	Socorro	LINEAR	KOR	1.8 km	MPC · JPL
341406	2007 TT_{167}	—	October 12, 2007	Socorro	LINEAR	·	4.8 km	MPC · JPL
341407	2007 TU_{167}	—	October 12, 2007	Socorro	LINEAR	EOS	2.5 km	MPC · JPL
341408	2007 TZ_{168}	—	October 12, 2007	Socorro	LINEAR	·	3.0 km	MPC · JPL
341409	2007 TM_{170}	—	October 12, 2007	Socorro	LINEAR	·	2.6 km	MPC · JPL
341410	2007 TN_{173}	—	October 4, 2007	Kitt Peak	Spacewatch	KOR	1.5 km	MPC · JPL
341411	2007 TV_{173}	—	October 4, 2007	Kitt Peak	Spacewatch	·	4.7 km	MPC · JPL
341412	2007 TQ_{182}	—	October 8, 2007	Anderson Mesa	LONEOS	slow	4.7 km	MPC · JPL
341413	2007 TW_{184}	—	October 13, 2007	Gaisberg	Gierlinger, R.	EOS	2.2 km	MPC · JPL
341414	2007 TC_{186}	—	October 13, 2007	Socorro	LINEAR	·	2.6 km	MPC · JPL
341415	2007 TR_{186}	—	October 8, 2007	Anderson Mesa	LONEOS	·	2.2 km	MPC · JPL
341416	2007 TU_{189}	—	September 10, 2007	Mount Lemmon	Mount Lemmon Survey	·	1.6 km	MPC · JPL
341417	2007 TC_{195}	—	October 7, 2007	Mount Lemmon	Mount Lemmon Survey	·	2.5 km	MPC · JPL
341418	2007 TZ_{198}	—	October 8, 2007	Kitt Peak	Spacewatch	·	2.4 km	MPC · JPL
341419	2007 TC_{200}	—	May 16, 2005	Mount Lemmon	Mount Lemmon Survey	EOS	2.1 km	MPC · JPL
341420	2007 TH_{201}	—	October 8, 2007	Kitt Peak	Spacewatch	·	1.5 km	MPC · JPL
341421	2007 TW_{201}	—	October 8, 2007	Mount Lemmon	Mount Lemmon Survey	·	2.7 km	MPC · JPL
341422	2007 TL_{203}	—	October 8, 2007	Mount Lemmon	Mount Lemmon Survey	EOS	2.6 km	MPC · JPL
341423	2007 TZ_{203}	—	September 10, 2007	Mount Lemmon	Mount Lemmon Survey	·	3.1 km	MPC · JPL
341424	2007 TJ_{204}	—	October 8, 2007	Mount Lemmon	Mount Lemmon Survey	·	3.0 km	MPC · JPL
341425	2007 TP_{204}	—	October 8, 2007	Mount Lemmon	Mount Lemmon Survey	·	2.6 km	MPC · JPL
341426	2007 TV_{205}	—	October 9, 2007	Anderson Mesa	LONEOS	·	4.0 km	MPC · JPL
341427	2007 TB_{216}	—	October 7, 2007	Kitt Peak	Spacewatch	HYG	5.7 km	MPC · JPL
341428	2007 TB_{217}	—	October 7, 2007	Kitt Peak	Spacewatch	EOS	2.8 km	MPC · JPL
341429	2007 TB_{222}	—	October 9, 2007	Kitt Peak	Spacewatch	·	3.3 km	MPC · JPL
341430	2007 TX_{222}	—	October 10, 2007	Kitt Peak	Spacewatch	·	1.8 km	MPC · JPL
341431	2007 TC_{229}	—	October 8, 2007	Kitt Peak	Spacewatch	·	3.4 km	MPC · JPL
341432	2007 TA_{230}	—	October 8, 2007	Catalina	CSS	EOS	2.2 km	MPC · JPL
341433	2007 TW_{230}	—	October 8, 2007	Kitt Peak	Spacewatch	·	2.3 km	MPC · JPL
341434	2007 TS_{231}	—	October 8, 2007	Kitt Peak	Spacewatch	·	1.9 km	MPC · JPL
341435	2007 TJ_{232}	—	October 8, 2007	Kitt Peak	Spacewatch	VER	3.0 km	MPC · JPL
341436	2007 TC_{233}	—	October 8, 2007	Kitt Peak	Spacewatch	·	2.2 km	MPC · JPL
341437	2007 TL_{236}	—	September 14, 2007	Mount Lemmon	Mount Lemmon Survey	·	2.6 km	MPC · JPL
341438	2007 TU_{236}	—	October 9, 2007	Mount Lemmon	Mount Lemmon Survey	·	2.9 km	MPC · JPL
341439	2007 TV_{238}	—	October 10, 2007	Mount Lemmon	Mount Lemmon Survey	·	1.8 km	MPC · JPL
341440	2007 TF_{240}	—	October 14, 2007	Socorro	LINEAR	EOS	2.6 km	MPC · JPL
341441	2007 TA_{245}	—	October 8, 2007	Catalina	CSS	EOS	2.1 km	MPC · JPL
341442	2007 TK_{245}	—	October 8, 2007	Catalina	CSS	EOS	2.6 km	MPC · JPL
341443	2007 TY_{246}	—	October 9, 2007	Catalina	CSS	·	5.6 km	MPC · JPL
341444	2007 TP_{250}	—	October 11, 2007	Mount Lemmon	Mount Lemmon Survey	·	4.5 km	MPC · JPL
341445	2007 TQ_{254}	—	October 8, 2007	Mount Lemmon	Mount Lemmon Survey	·	2.7 km	MPC · JPL
341446	2007 TC_{256}	—	October 10, 2007	Kitt Peak	Spacewatch	EOS	2.9 km	MPC · JPL
341447	2007 TN_{261}	—	October 10, 2007	Kitt Peak	Spacewatch	·	2.2 km	MPC · JPL
341448	2007 TG_{265}	—	October 11, 2007	Kitt Peak	Spacewatch	·	2.3 km	MPC · JPL
341449	2007 TK_{268}	—	October 9, 2007	Kitt Peak	Spacewatch	EOS	2.2 km	MPC · JPL
341450	2007 TP_{269}	—	October 9, 2007	Kitt Peak	Spacewatch	·	1.9 km	MPC · JPL
341451	2007 TB_{271}	—	October 9, 2007	Kitt Peak	Spacewatch	·	1.6 km	MPC · JPL
341452	2007 TM_{271}	—	October 9, 2007	Kitt Peak	Spacewatch	EOS	2.3 km	MPC · JPL
341453	2007 TN_{271}	—	October 9, 2007	Kitt Peak	Spacewatch	KOR	1.4 km	MPC · JPL
341454	2007 TP_{287}	—	September 12, 2007	Catalina	CSS	EOS	3.3 km	MPC · JPL
341455	2007 TF_{299}	—	October 12, 2007	Kitt Peak	Spacewatch	·	2.1 km	MPC · JPL
341456	2007 TV_{300}	—	October 12, 2007	Kitt Peak	Spacewatch	·	2.4 km	MPC · JPL
341457	2007 TY_{303}	—	October 12, 2007	Mount Lemmon	Mount Lemmon Survey	·	3.2 km	MPC · JPL
341458	2007 TC_{305}	—	October 13, 2007	Mount Lemmon	Mount Lemmon Survey	·	2.5 km	MPC · JPL
341459	2007 TP_{307}	—	October 9, 2007	Kitt Peak	Spacewatch	·	2.9 km	MPC · JPL
341460	2007 TY_{307}	—	October 9, 2007	Mount Lemmon	Mount Lemmon Survey	·	1.7 km	MPC · JPL
341461	2007 TX_{313}	—	October 11, 2007	Mount Lemmon	Mount Lemmon Survey	·	2.5 km	MPC · JPL
341462	2007 TL_{314}	—	October 11, 2007	Mount Lemmon	Mount Lemmon Survey	·	2.7 km	MPC · JPL
341463	2007 TK_{315}	—	October 12, 2007	Kitt Peak	Spacewatch	·	2.2 km	MPC · JPL
341464	2007 TL_{315}	—	October 12, 2007	Kitt Peak	Spacewatch	·	1.9 km	MPC · JPL
341465	2007 TN_{315}	—	October 12, 2007	Kitt Peak	Spacewatch	THM	1.9 km	MPC · JPL
341466	2007 TS_{315}	—	October 12, 2007	Kitt Peak	Spacewatch	·	2.7 km	MPC · JPL
341467	2007 TG_{317}	—	October 12, 2007	Kitt Peak	Spacewatch	·	2.7 km	MPC · JPL
341468	2007 TN_{319}	—	October 12, 2007	Kitt Peak	Spacewatch	·	3.4 km	MPC · JPL
341469	2007 TV_{319}	—	October 12, 2007	Kitt Peak	Spacewatch	·	2.4 km	MPC · JPL
341470	2007 TB_{324}	—	October 11, 2007	Kitt Peak	Spacewatch	·	2.5 km	MPC · JPL
341471	2007 TV_{329}	—	October 11, 2007	Kitt Peak	Spacewatch	·	2.6 km	MPC · JPL
341472	2007 TD_{330}	—	October 11, 2007	Kitt Peak	Spacewatch	HYG	3.3 km	MPC · JPL
341473	2007 TQ_{334}	—	October 11, 2007	Kitt Peak	Spacewatch	·	3.6 km	MPC · JPL
341474	2007 TO_{344}	—	October 10, 2007	Mount Lemmon	Mount Lemmon Survey	·	2.7 km	MPC · JPL
341475	2007 TJ_{353}	—	October 8, 2007	Mount Lemmon	Mount Lemmon Survey	KOR	1.6 km	MPC · JPL
341476	2007 TK_{354}	—	October 10, 2007	Catalina	CSS	EOS	2.6 km	MPC · JPL
341477	2007 TC_{362}	—	October 14, 2007	Mount Lemmon	Mount Lemmon Survey	·	3.8 km	MPC · JPL
341478	2007 TD_{362}	—	October 14, 2007	Mount Lemmon	Mount Lemmon Survey	·	2.2 km	MPC · JPL
341479	2007 TE_{362}	—	October 14, 2007	Mount Lemmon	Mount Lemmon Survey	THM	2.3 km	MPC · JPL
341480	2007 TF_{363}	—	October 14, 2007	Mount Lemmon	Mount Lemmon Survey	·	2.3 km	MPC · JPL
341481	2007 TK_{363}	—	October 14, 2007	Mount Lemmon	Mount Lemmon Survey	·	4.5 km	MPC · JPL
341482	2007 TO_{363}	—	October 14, 2007	Mount Lemmon	Mount Lemmon Survey	·	2.9 km	MPC · JPL
341483	2007 TN_{364}	—	October 15, 2007	Catalina	CSS	EOS	2.2 km	MPC · JPL
341484	2007 TV_{365}	—	October 9, 2007	Mount Lemmon	Mount Lemmon Survey	KOR	1.5 km	MPC · JPL
341485	2007 TX_{365}	—	October 9, 2007	Mount Lemmon	Mount Lemmon Survey	KOR	1.5 km	MPC · JPL
341486	2007 TE_{368}	—	October 10, 2007	Mount Lemmon	Mount Lemmon Survey	EOS	2.7 km	MPC · JPL
341487	2007 TK_{371}	—	October 12, 2007	Mount Lemmon	Mount Lemmon Survey	·	5.3 km	MPC · JPL
341488	2007 TZ_{375}	—	October 15, 2007	Mount Lemmon	Mount Lemmon Survey	·	1.7 km	MPC · JPL
341489	2007 TN_{379}	—	October 13, 2007	Catalina	CSS	KOR	1.5 km	MPC · JPL
341490	2007 TV_{380}	—	October 14, 2007	Kitt Peak	Spacewatch	EOS	2.5 km	MPC · JPL
341491	2007 TN_{381}	—	October 14, 2007	Kitt Peak	Spacewatch	·	3.2 km	MPC · JPL
341492	2007 TU_{381}	—	October 14, 2007	Kitt Peak	Spacewatch	KOR	1.3 km	MPC · JPL
341493	2007 TZ_{381}	—	October 14, 2007	Kitt Peak	Spacewatch	·	3.9 km	MPC · JPL
341494	2007 TA_{385}	—	October 14, 2007	Mount Lemmon	Mount Lemmon Survey	·	2.7 km	MPC · JPL
341495	2007 TF_{388}	—	October 13, 2007	Mount Lemmon	Mount Lemmon Survey	·	2.2 km	MPC · JPL
341496	2007 TZ_{390}	—	October 8, 2007	Mount Lemmon	Mount Lemmon Survey	·	3.0 km	MPC · JPL
341497	2007 TL_{392}	—	October 15, 2007	Catalina	CSS	·	3.1 km	MPC · JPL
341498	2007 TG_{393}	—	October 13, 2007	Kitt Peak	Spacewatch	·	2.2 km	MPC · JPL
341499	2007 TH_{399}	—	October 15, 2007	Kitt Peak	Spacewatch	·	2.6 km	MPC · JPL
341500	2007 TL_{399}	—	October 15, 2007	Catalina	CSS	·	3.1 km	MPC · JPL

== 341501–341600 ==
back to top

Designation			Discovery			Properties		Ref
Permanent	Provisional	Named after	Date	Site	Discoverer(s)	Category	Diam.	Ref
341501	2007 TX_{403}	—	October 15, 2007	Kitt Peak	Spacewatch	·	4.0 km	MPC · JPL
341502	2007 TN_{405}	—	October 15, 2007	Kitt Peak	Spacewatch	EOS	2.1 km	MPC · JPL
341503	2007 TO_{405}	—	October 15, 2007	Kitt Peak	Spacewatch	·	3.1 km	MPC · JPL
341504	2007 TQ_{405}	—	October 15, 2007	Kitt Peak	Spacewatch	·	1.8 km	MPC · JPL
341505	2007 TV_{405}	—	October 15, 2007	Kitt Peak	Spacewatch	·	3.0 km	MPC · JPL
341506	2007 TG_{408}	—	October 15, 2007	Mount Lemmon	Mount Lemmon Survey	·	5.3 km	MPC · JPL
341507	2007 TB_{410}	—	October 15, 2007	Kitt Peak	Spacewatch	H	500 m	MPC · JPL
341508	2007 TC_{410}	—	October 15, 2007	Kitt Peak	Spacewatch	·	1.4 km	MPC · JPL
341509	2007 TD_{414}	—	October 15, 2007	Catalina	CSS	·	2.2 km	MPC · JPL
341510	2007 TP_{418}	—	October 7, 2007	Catalina	CSS	·	3.3 km	MPC · JPL
341511	2007 TS_{418}	—	October 8, 2007	Kitt Peak	Spacewatch	EOS	1.7 km	MPC · JPL
341512	2007 TC_{419}	—	October 10, 2007	Catalina	CSS	·	3.9 km	MPC · JPL
341513	2007 TB_{420}	—	October 9, 2007	Catalina	CSS	·	5.3 km	MPC · JPL
341514	2007 TB_{421}	—	October 11, 2007	Catalina	CSS	·	3.6 km	MPC · JPL
341515	2007 TF_{425}	—	October 8, 2007	Kitt Peak	Spacewatch	·	2.1 km	MPC · JPL
341516	2007 TR_{426}	—	October 9, 2007	Kitt Peak	Spacewatch	(43176)	3.0 km	MPC · JPL
341517	2007 TL_{427}	—	October 10, 2007	Catalina	CSS	EOS	2.6 km	MPC · JPL
341518	2007 TU_{427}	—	October 10, 2007	Catalina	CSS	·	2.7 km	MPC · JPL
341519	2007 TD_{429}	—	October 12, 2007	Kitt Peak	Spacewatch	·	2.7 km	MPC · JPL
341520 Mors–Somnus	2007 TY_{430}	Mors–Somnus	October 14, 2007	Mauna Kea	S. S. Sheppard, C. A. Trujillo	plutino · moon	102 km	MPC · JPL
341521	2007 TG_{432}	—	October 4, 2007	Kitt Peak	Spacewatch	·	1.8 km	MPC · JPL
341522	2007 TL_{432}	—	October 4, 2007	Kitt Peak	Spacewatch	·	1.9 km	MPC · JPL
341523	2007 TT_{432}	—	October 7, 2007	Mount Lemmon	Mount Lemmon Survey	·	4.3 km	MPC · JPL
341524	2007 TL_{434}	—	October 9, 2007	Kitt Peak	Spacewatch	·	2.5 km	MPC · JPL
341525	2007 TU_{435}	—	October 14, 2007	Kitt Peak	Spacewatch	·	2.6 km	MPC · JPL
341526	2007 TT_{440}	—	October 8, 2007	Catalina	CSS	EOS	2.5 km	MPC · JPL
341527	2007 TF_{441}	—	October 12, 2007	Catalina	CSS	·	2.8 km	MPC · JPL
341528	2007 TR_{441}	—	October 7, 2007	Catalina	CSS	EOS	4.4 km	MPC · JPL
341529	2007 TT_{442}	—	October 9, 2007	Catalina	CSS	·	4.4 km	MPC · JPL
341530	2007 TC_{443}	—	October 11, 2007	Catalina	CSS	·	2.1 km	MPC · JPL
341531	2007 TQ_{443}	—	October 9, 2007	Socorro	LINEAR	EOS	2.3 km	MPC · JPL
341532	2007 TR_{443}	—	October 6, 1996	Kitt Peak	Spacewatch	EOS	2.3 km	MPC · JPL
341533	2007 TX_{444}	—	October 16, 2002	Needville	Needville	·	2.2 km	MPC · JPL
341534	2007 TY_{444}	—	October 11, 2007	Kitt Peak	Spacewatch	·	2.9 km	MPC · JPL
341535	2007 TO_{445}	—	October 6, 2007	Socorro	LINEAR	·	2.3 km	MPC · JPL
341536	2007 TT_{445}	—	October 7, 2007	Kitt Peak	Spacewatch	·	3.4 km	MPC · JPL
341537	2007 TH_{446}	—	October 9, 2007	Kitt Peak	Spacewatch	·	2.1 km	MPC · JPL
341538	2007 TZ_{446}	—	October 10, 2007	Catalina	CSS	TEL	2.0 km	MPC · JPL
341539	2007 TE_{449}	—	October 9, 2007	Mount Lemmon	Mount Lemmon Survey	·	4.4 km	MPC · JPL
341540	2007 TA_{451}	—	October 14, 2007	Kitt Peak	Spacewatch	EOS	2.3 km	MPC · JPL
341541	2007 TL_{452}	—	October 7, 2007	Kitt Peak	Spacewatch	·	2.3 km	MPC · JPL
341542	2007 TN_{452}	—	October 9, 2007	Catalina	CSS	·	3.4 km	MPC · JPL
341543	2007 TA_{453}	—	October 14, 2007	Mount Lemmon	Mount Lemmon Survey	·	3.3 km	MPC · JPL
341544	2007 UC_{1}	—	October 16, 2007	Bisei SG Center	BATTeRS	·	2.4 km	MPC · JPL
341545	2007 UF_{3}	—	October 17, 2007	7300	W. K. Y. Yeung	EOS	2.7 km	MPC · JPL
341546	2007 UG_{3}	—	October 17, 2007	7300	W. K. Y. Yeung	·	2.7 km	MPC · JPL
341547	2007 UV_{4}	—	October 17, 2007	Dauban	Chante-Perdrix	BRA	2.1 km	MPC · JPL
341548	2007 UW_{4}	—	October 17, 2007	Dauban	Chante-Perdrix	EOS	2.0 km	MPC · JPL
341549	2007 UX_{7}	—	October 16, 2007	Catalina	CSS	EOS	2.6 km	MPC · JPL
341550	2007 UC_{8}	—	October 16, 2007	Catalina	CSS	TEL	2.1 km	MPC · JPL
341551	2007 UN_{11}	—	October 9, 2007	Kitt Peak	Spacewatch	·	2.0 km	MPC · JPL
341552	2007 UM_{21}	—	October 16, 2007	Kitt Peak	Spacewatch	·	2.0 km	MPC · JPL
341553	2007 UZ_{21}	—	October 16, 2007	Kitt Peak	Spacewatch	·	1.9 km	MPC · JPL
341554	2007 UK_{22}	—	October 16, 2007	Kitt Peak	Spacewatch	·	3.4 km	MPC · JPL
341555	2007 UZ_{22}	—	October 16, 2007	Kitt Peak	Spacewatch	KOR	1.6 km	MPC · JPL
341556	2007 UX_{23}	—	October 16, 2007	Kitt Peak	Spacewatch	·	2.8 km	MPC · JPL
341557	2007 UD_{24}	—	October 8, 2007	Mount Lemmon	Mount Lemmon Survey	·	1.8 km	MPC · JPL
341558	2007 UZ_{24}	—	October 16, 2007	Kitt Peak	Spacewatch	·	2.8 km	MPC · JPL
341559	2007 UU_{25}	—	October 16, 2007	Kitt Peak	Spacewatch	·	2.8 km	MPC · JPL
341560	2007 UQ_{33}	—	October 16, 2007	Catalina	CSS	·	4.1 km	MPC · JPL
341561	2007 US_{36}	—	October 19, 2007	Kitt Peak	Spacewatch	EOS	2.0 km	MPC · JPL
341562	2007 UE_{39}	—	October 20, 2007	Catalina	CSS	EOS	2.0 km	MPC · JPL
341563	2007 UG_{40}	—	October 20, 2007	Mount Lemmon	Mount Lemmon Survey	EOS	2.8 km	MPC · JPL
341564	2007 UH_{43}	—	October 18, 2007	Kitt Peak	Spacewatch	·	2.1 km	MPC · JPL
341565	2007 UR_{43}	—	October 18, 2007	Kitt Peak	Spacewatch	KOR	1.4 km	MPC · JPL
341566	2007 UJ_{46}	—	October 20, 2007	Catalina	CSS	·	4.7 km	MPC · JPL
341567	2007 UP_{48}	—	October 20, 2007	Mount Lemmon	Mount Lemmon Survey	EOS	2.7 km	MPC · JPL
341568	2007 UC_{49}	—	October 21, 2007	Kitt Peak	Spacewatch	·	4.6 km	MPC · JPL
341569	2007 UG_{51}	—	October 24, 2007	Mount Lemmon	Mount Lemmon Survey	EUP	5.2 km	MPC · JPL
341570	2007 UJ_{54}	—	October 30, 2007	Kitt Peak	Spacewatch	·	2.7 km	MPC · JPL
341571	2007 UP_{55}	—	October 30, 2007	Kitt Peak	Spacewatch	·	2.0 km	MPC · JPL
341572	2007 UW_{55}	—	October 30, 2007	Kitt Peak	Spacewatch	THM	2.2 km	MPC · JPL
341573	2007 UM_{57}	—	October 30, 2007	Mount Lemmon	Mount Lemmon Survey	·	3.0 km	MPC · JPL
341574	2007 UN_{57}	—	October 30, 2007	Mount Lemmon	Mount Lemmon Survey	·	3.3 km	MPC · JPL
341575	2007 UJ_{60}	—	October 30, 2007	Mount Lemmon	Mount Lemmon Survey	·	1.8 km	MPC · JPL
341576	2007 UH_{61}	—	October 30, 2007	Mount Lemmon	Mount Lemmon Survey	EOS	4.9 km	MPC · JPL
341577	2007 UU_{61}	—	October 30, 2007	Kitt Peak	Spacewatch	·	2.6 km	MPC · JPL
341578	2007 UB_{63}	—	October 30, 2007	Kitt Peak	Spacewatch	·	1.7 km	MPC · JPL
341579	2007 UA_{67}	—	October 30, 2007	Kitt Peak	Spacewatch	·	2.1 km	MPC · JPL
341580	2007 UE_{77}	—	October 31, 2007	Mount Lemmon	Mount Lemmon Survey	·	2.3 km	MPC · JPL
341581	2007 UN_{77}	—	October 31, 2007	Catalina	CSS	·	2.3 km	MPC · JPL
341582	2007 UJ_{81}	—	October 30, 2007	Kitt Peak	Spacewatch	·	2.0 km	MPC · JPL
341583	2007 UP_{82}	—	October 30, 2007	Kitt Peak	Spacewatch	EOS	2.6 km	MPC · JPL
341584	2007 UY_{82}	—	October 30, 2007	Kitt Peak	Spacewatch	·	2.5 km	MPC · JPL
341585	2007 UZ_{85}	—	October 30, 2007	Kitt Peak	Spacewatch	·	2.8 km	MPC · JPL
341586	2007 UL_{87}	—	October 30, 2007	Kitt Peak	Spacewatch	·	2.8 km	MPC · JPL
341587	2007 UT_{88}	—	October 30, 2007	Mount Lemmon	Mount Lemmon Survey	·	2.6 km	MPC · JPL
341588	2007 UB_{89}	—	October 30, 2007	Mount Lemmon	Mount Lemmon Survey	·	2.9 km	MPC · JPL
341589	2007 UJ_{89}	—	October 30, 2007	Mount Lemmon	Mount Lemmon Survey	·	1.8 km	MPC · JPL
341590 Emmawatson	2007 UM_{90}	Emmawatson	October 30, 2007	Mount Lemmon	Catalina Sky Survey	·	3.2 km	MPC · JPL
341591	2007 UF_{94}	—	October 31, 2007	Mount Lemmon	Mount Lemmon Survey	·	4.0 km	MPC · JPL
341592	2007 UH_{97}	—	October 30, 2007	Mount Lemmon	Mount Lemmon Survey	·	1.8 km	MPC · JPL
341593	2007 UH_{98}	—	October 30, 2007	Kitt Peak	Spacewatch	(8737)	3.8 km	MPC · JPL
341594	2007 UP_{98}	—	October 30, 2007	Kitt Peak	Spacewatch	THM	2.7 km	MPC · JPL
341595	2007 UX_{98}	—	October 30, 2007	Kitt Peak	Spacewatch	·	2.9 km	MPC · JPL
341596	2007 UA_{99}	—	October 30, 2007	Kitt Peak	Spacewatch	·	3.8 km	MPC · JPL
341597	2007 UH_{99}	—	October 30, 2007	Kitt Peak	Spacewatch	·	2.5 km	MPC · JPL
341598	2007 UT_{100}	—	October 30, 2007	Kitt Peak	Spacewatch	EOS	2.2 km	MPC · JPL
341599	2007 UC_{104}	—	October 30, 2007	Kitt Peak	Spacewatch	VER	2.8 km	MPC · JPL
341600	2007 UT_{105}	—	October 30, 2007	Kitt Peak	Spacewatch	·	3.3 km	MPC · JPL

== 341601–341700 ==
back to top

Designation			Discovery			Properties		Ref
Permanent	Provisional	Named after	Date	Site	Discoverer(s)	Category	Diam.	Ref
341601	2007 UW_{105}	—	October 30, 2007	Kitt Peak	Spacewatch	3:2	6.9 km	MPC · JPL
341602	2007 UG_{107}	—	October 31, 2007	Catalina	CSS	·	4.3 km	MPC · JPL
341603	2007 UV_{107}	—	October 30, 2007	Kitt Peak	Spacewatch	·	1.7 km	MPC · JPL
341604	2007 UH_{108}	—	October 30, 2007	Kitt Peak	Spacewatch	·	3.2 km	MPC · JPL
341605	2007 UH_{114}	—	October 31, 2007	Kitt Peak	Spacewatch	·	3.4 km	MPC · JPL
341606	2007 UA_{115}	—	October 31, 2007	Kitt Peak	Spacewatch	EOS	2.3 km	MPC · JPL
341607	2007 UP_{118}	—	October 31, 2007	Mount Lemmon	Mount Lemmon Survey	KOR	1.4 km	MPC · JPL
341608	2007 UD_{124}	—	October 31, 2007	Mount Lemmon	Mount Lemmon Survey	·	2.4 km	MPC · JPL
341609	2007 UP_{125}	—	October 17, 2007	Mount Lemmon	Mount Lemmon Survey	EOS	2.4 km	MPC · JPL
341610	2007 UL_{127}	—	October 30, 2007	Kitt Peak	Spacewatch	·	3.1 km	MPC · JPL
341611	2007 UP_{128}	—	October 20, 2007	Mount Lemmon	Mount Lemmon Survey	·	4.6 km	MPC · JPL
341612	2007 UW_{128}	—	October 24, 2007	Mount Lemmon	Mount Lemmon Survey	·	3.3 km	MPC · JPL
341613	2007 UD_{129}	—	October 16, 2007	Mount Lemmon	Mount Lemmon Survey	EOS	2.1 km	MPC · JPL
341614	2007 UH_{130}	—	October 18, 2007	Kitt Peak	Spacewatch	·	3.1 km	MPC · JPL
341615	2007 UJ_{131}	—	October 16, 2007	Catalina	CSS	·	3.8 km	MPC · JPL
341616	2007 UT_{131}	—	October 17, 2007	Mount Lemmon	Mount Lemmon Survey	EOS	2.1 km	MPC · JPL
341617	2007 UH_{132}	—	October 19, 2007	Kitt Peak	Spacewatch	·	4.8 km	MPC · JPL
341618	2007 UQ_{132}	—	October 20, 2007	Mount Lemmon	Mount Lemmon Survey	·	2.6 km	MPC · JPL
341619	2007 UJ_{133}	—	October 30, 2007	Kitt Peak	Spacewatch	·	3.0 km	MPC · JPL
341620	2007 US_{137}	—	October 17, 2007	Mount Lemmon	Mount Lemmon Survey	·	3.7 km	MPC · JPL
341621	2007 UW_{138}	—	October 21, 2007	Kitt Peak	Spacewatch	·	3.2 km	MPC · JPL
341622	2007 UD_{139}	—	October 21, 2007	Catalina	CSS	EOS	2.4 km	MPC · JPL
341623	2007 UG_{139}	—	October 21, 2007	Mount Lemmon	Mount Lemmon Survey	VER	5.8 km	MPC · JPL
341624	2007 UC_{141}	—	October 21, 2007	Kitt Peak	Spacewatch	·	3.1 km	MPC · JPL
341625	2007 VK_{1}	—	November 2, 2007	Pla D'Arguines	R. Ferrando	EOS	2.3 km	MPC · JPL
341626	2007 VT_{2}	—	November 3, 2007	La Cañada	Lacruz, J.	·	2.8 km	MPC · JPL
341627	2007 VN_{4}	—	November 3, 2007	Costitx	OAM	·	3.0 km	MPC · JPL
341628	2007 VY_{8}	—	November 2, 2007	Kitt Peak	Spacewatch	EOS	2.1 km	MPC · JPL
341629	2007 VG_{9}	—	November 2, 2007	Mount Lemmon	Mount Lemmon Survey	·	2.7 km	MPC · JPL
341630	2007 VD_{10}	—	November 1, 2007	Črni Vrh	Mikuž, H.	EOS	2.8 km	MPC · JPL
341631	2007 VT_{12}	—	November 1, 2007	Kitt Peak	Spacewatch	TIR	3.0 km	MPC · JPL
341632	2007 VM_{13}	—	November 1, 2007	Mount Lemmon	Mount Lemmon Survey	·	2.0 km	MPC · JPL
341633	2007 VB_{16}	—	November 1, 2007	Kitt Peak	Spacewatch	MRX	1.3 km	MPC · JPL
341634	2007 VQ_{16}	—	November 1, 2007	Mount Lemmon	Mount Lemmon Survey	·	3.5 km	MPC · JPL
341635	2007 VS_{18}	—	November 1, 2007	Mount Lemmon	Mount Lemmon Survey	·	2.7 km	MPC · JPL
341636	2007 VG_{25}	—	November 2, 2007	Catalina	CSS	·	4.1 km	MPC · JPL
341637	2007 VU_{25}	—	November 2, 2007	Mount Lemmon	Mount Lemmon Survey	·	2.5 km	MPC · JPL
341638	2007 VN_{28}	—	November 2, 2007	Mount Lemmon	Mount Lemmon Survey	·	2.0 km	MPC · JPL
341639	2007 VB_{29}	—	November 3, 2007	Mount Lemmon	Mount Lemmon Survey	THM	2.2 km	MPC · JPL
341640	2007 VS_{31}	—	November 2, 2007	Kitt Peak	Spacewatch	·	1.9 km	MPC · JPL
341641	2007 VK_{33}	—	November 2, 2007	Kitt Peak	Spacewatch	·	2.7 km	MPC · JPL
341642	2007 VL_{33}	—	November 2, 2007	Kitt Peak	Spacewatch	·	1.9 km	MPC · JPL
341643	2007 VM_{38}	—	November 2, 2007	Catalina	CSS	EOS	2.0 km	MPC · JPL
341644	2007 VN_{38}	—	November 2, 2007	Catalina	CSS	·	5.0 km	MPC · JPL
341645	2007 VO_{43}	—	November 1, 2007	Kitt Peak	Spacewatch	·	3.5 km	MPC · JPL
341646	2007 VC_{44}	—	November 1, 2007	Kitt Peak	Spacewatch	·	5.6 km	MPC · JPL
341647	2007 VD_{46}	—	November 1, 2007	Kitt Peak	Spacewatch	·	4.8 km	MPC · JPL
341648	2007 VL_{46}	—	November 1, 2007	Kitt Peak	Spacewatch	·	2.3 km	MPC · JPL
341649	2007 VK_{49}	—	November 1, 2007	Kitt Peak	Spacewatch	·	2.9 km	MPC · JPL
341650	2007 VQ_{51}	—	November 1, 2007	Kitt Peak	Spacewatch	EOS	2.2 km	MPC · JPL
341651	2007 VZ_{51}	—	November 1, 2007	Kitt Peak	Spacewatch	·	3.1 km	MPC · JPL
341652	2007 VG_{52}	—	November 1, 2007	Kitt Peak	Spacewatch	·	3.1 km	MPC · JPL
341653	2007 VR_{52}	—	November 1, 2007	Kitt Peak	Spacewatch	·	2.4 km	MPC · JPL
341654	2007 VO_{55}	—	November 1, 2007	Kitt Peak	Spacewatch	·	2.7 km	MPC · JPL
341655	2007 VG_{59}	—	November 1, 2007	Kitt Peak	Spacewatch	EOS	1.8 km	MPC · JPL
341656	2007 VQ_{59}	—	November 1, 2007	Kitt Peak	Spacewatch	·	2.7 km	MPC · JPL
341657	2007 VT_{60}	—	November 1, 2007	Kitt Peak	Spacewatch	·	2.0 km	MPC · JPL
341658	2007 VU_{61}	—	November 1, 2007	Kitt Peak	Spacewatch	·	2.5 km	MPC · JPL
341659	2007 VC_{62}	—	November 1, 2007	Kitt Peak	Spacewatch	·	4.4 km	MPC · JPL
341660	2007 VZ_{62}	—	November 1, 2007	Kitt Peak	Spacewatch	THM	2.4 km	MPC · JPL
341661	2007 VK_{63}	—	November 1, 2007	Kitt Peak	Spacewatch	·	2.6 km	MPC · JPL
341662	2007 VS_{64}	—	November 1, 2007	Kitt Peak	Spacewatch	·	3.2 km	MPC · JPL
341663	2007 VE_{72}	—	November 1, 2007	Kitt Peak	Spacewatch	·	3.9 km	MPC · JPL
341664	2007 VO_{73}	—	November 2, 2007	Kitt Peak	Spacewatch	LIX	4.2 km	MPC · JPL
341665	2007 VZ_{75}	—	November 3, 2007	Kitt Peak	Spacewatch	THM	2.7 km	MPC · JPL
341666	2007 VK_{76}	—	November 3, 2007	Kitt Peak	Spacewatch	THM	2.5 km	MPC · JPL
341667	2007 VE_{78}	—	November 3, 2007	Kitt Peak	Spacewatch	·	3.5 km	MPC · JPL
341668	2007 VR_{85}	—	February 13, 1999	Kitt Peak	Spacewatch	·	3.8 km	MPC · JPL
341669	2007 VF_{86}	—	November 2, 2007	Socorro	LINEAR	EOS	2.6 km	MPC · JPL
341670	2007 VW_{86}	—	November 2, 2007	Socorro	LINEAR	·	3.3 km	MPC · JPL
341671	2007 VZ_{86}	—	November 2, 2007	Socorro	LINEAR	EOS	2.2 km	MPC · JPL
341672	2007 VF_{87}	—	November 2, 2007	Socorro	LINEAR	·	5.5 km	MPC · JPL
341673	2007 VJ_{87}	—	November 2, 2007	Socorro	LINEAR	·	4.2 km	MPC · JPL
341674	2007 VX_{88}	—	November 3, 2007	Socorro	LINEAR	·	4.1 km	MPC · JPL
341675	2007 VN_{90}	—	November 5, 2007	Socorro	LINEAR	·	2.7 km	MPC · JPL
341676	2007 VP_{90}	—	November 5, 2007	Socorro	LINEAR	·	5.6 km	MPC · JPL
341677	2007 VE_{92}	—	November 8, 2007	Socorro	LINEAR	H	700 m	MPC · JPL
341678	2007 VS_{92}	—	November 3, 2007	Socorro	LINEAR	·	3.4 km	MPC · JPL
341679	2007 VV_{94}	—	November 8, 2007	Socorro	LINEAR	·	2.0 km	MPC · JPL
341680	2007 VB_{102}	—	November 2, 2007	Kitt Peak	Spacewatch	·	2.4 km	MPC · JPL
341681	2007 VD_{104}	—	November 3, 2007	Kitt Peak	Spacewatch	·	2.5 km	MPC · JPL
341682	2007 VT_{105}	—	November 3, 2007	Kitt Peak	Spacewatch	·	3.7 km	MPC · JPL
341683	2007 VS_{107}	—	November 3, 2007	Kitt Peak	Spacewatch	EOS	5.1 km	MPC · JPL
341684	2007 VP_{109}	—	November 3, 2007	Kitt Peak	Spacewatch	·	2.0 km	MPC · JPL
341685	2007 VM_{110}	—	November 3, 2007	Kitt Peak	Spacewatch	·	4.9 km	MPC · JPL
341686	2007 VK_{115}	—	November 3, 2007	Kitt Peak	Spacewatch	VER	3.1 km	MPC · JPL
341687	2007 VM_{118}	—	November 4, 2007	Mount Lemmon	Mount Lemmon Survey	·	3.0 km	MPC · JPL
341688	2007 VQ_{119}	—	November 5, 2007	Kitt Peak	Spacewatch	·	4.7 km	MPC · JPL
341689	2007 VS_{122}	—	November 5, 2007	Mount Lemmon	Mount Lemmon Survey	·	2.6 km	MPC · JPL
341690	2007 VM_{126}	—	November 11, 2007	Catalina	CSS	H	740 m	MPC · JPL
341691	2007 VT_{133}	—	November 2, 2007	Catalina	CSS	·	3.6 km	MPC · JPL
341692	2007 VD_{135}	—	November 3, 2007	Kitt Peak	Spacewatch	KOR	1.4 km	MPC · JPL
341693	2007 VH_{141}	—	November 4, 2007	Kitt Peak	Spacewatch	·	4.1 km	MPC · JPL
341694	2007 VR_{141}	—	November 4, 2007	Kitt Peak	Spacewatch	EOS	2.2 km	MPC · JPL
341695	2007 VU_{146}	—	November 4, 2007	Mount Lemmon	Mount Lemmon Survey	·	2.3 km	MPC · JPL
341696	2007 VJ_{147}	—	November 4, 2007	Kitt Peak	Spacewatch	·	2.1 km	MPC · JPL
341697	2007 VD_{152}	—	November 2, 2007	Kitt Peak	Spacewatch	·	3.8 km	MPC · JPL
341698	2007 VK_{153}	—	November 4, 2007	Kitt Peak	Spacewatch	EOS	2.0 km	MPC · JPL
341699	2007 VE_{154}	—	November 4, 2007	Kitt Peak	Spacewatch	·	2.6 km	MPC · JPL
341700	2007 VF_{160}	—	November 5, 2007	Kitt Peak	Spacewatch	EOS	1.9 km	MPC · JPL

== 341701–341800 ==
back to top

Designation			Discovery			Properties		Ref
Permanent	Provisional	Named after	Date	Site	Discoverer(s)	Category	Diam.	Ref
341701	2007 VO_{161}	—	November 5, 2007	Kitt Peak	Spacewatch	·	3.8 km	MPC · JPL
341702	2007 VS_{166}	—	November 5, 2007	Kitt Peak	Spacewatch	·	3.5 km	MPC · JPL
341703	2007 VT_{167}	—	November 5, 2007	Kitt Peak	Spacewatch	·	4.5 km	MPC · JPL
341704	2007 VX_{168}	—	November 5, 2007	Kitt Peak	Spacewatch	·	3.3 km	MPC · JPL
341705	2007 VH_{172}	—	November 8, 2007	Kitt Peak	Spacewatch	·	1.6 km	MPC · JPL
341706	2007 VU_{173}	—	November 2, 2007	Catalina	CSS	·	2.9 km	MPC · JPL
341707	2007 VY_{173}	—	March 10, 2005	Kitt Peak	Deep Ecliptic Survey	·	1.8 km	MPC · JPL
341708	2007 VV_{180}	—	November 7, 2007	Catalina	CSS	EOS	2.2 km	MPC · JPL
341709	2007 VE_{183}	—	October 8, 2007	Mount Lemmon	Mount Lemmon Survey	·	3.0 km	MPC · JPL
341710	2007 VM_{183}	—	November 8, 2007	Catalina	CSS	·	2.8 km	MPC · JPL
341711	2007 VO_{185}	—	November 8, 2007	Catalina	CSS	TIR	3.5 km	MPC · JPL
341712	2007 VF_{188}	—	November 11, 2007	Goodricke-Pigott	R. A. Tucker	·	5.0 km	MPC · JPL
341713	2007 VC_{189}	—	November 13, 2007	Bisei SG Center	BATTeRS	·	4.2 km	MPC · JPL
341714	2007 VS_{191}	—	November 4, 2007	Mount Lemmon	Mount Lemmon Survey	·	4.2 km	MPC · JPL
341715	2007 VF_{195}	—	November 7, 2007	Mount Lemmon	Mount Lemmon Survey	·	1.9 km	MPC · JPL
341716	2007 VQ_{199}	—	November 9, 2007	Mount Lemmon	Mount Lemmon Survey	KOR	1.3 km	MPC · JPL
341717	2007 VC_{207}	—	November 9, 2007	Catalina	CSS	EOS	3.3 km	MPC · JPL
341718	2007 VM_{211}	—	November 9, 2007	Kitt Peak	Spacewatch	·	1.8 km	MPC · JPL
341719	2007 VV_{211}	—	November 9, 2007	Kitt Peak	Spacewatch	·	3.1 km	MPC · JPL
341720	2007 VE_{212}	—	October 20, 2007	Mount Lemmon	Mount Lemmon Survey	·	2.7 km	MPC · JPL
341721	2007 VF_{213}	—	November 9, 2007	Kitt Peak	Spacewatch	·	3.5 km	MPC · JPL
341722	2007 VM_{215}	—	November 9, 2007	Kitt Peak	Spacewatch	·	4.5 km	MPC · JPL
341723	2007 VC_{218}	—	November 9, 2007	Kitt Peak	Spacewatch	·	3.5 km	MPC · JPL
341724	2007 VG_{219}	—	November 9, 2007	Kitt Peak	Spacewatch	·	3.4 km	MPC · JPL
341725	2007 VL_{219}	—	November 9, 2007	Kitt Peak	Spacewatch	·	4.0 km	MPC · JPL
341726	2007 VB_{222}	—	November 6, 2007	Purple Mountain	PMO NEO Survey Program	·	2.4 km	MPC · JPL
341727	2007 VF_{228}	—	November 12, 2007	Mount Lemmon	Mount Lemmon Survey	AEG	5.0 km	MPC · JPL
341728	2007 VF_{229}	—	November 7, 2007	Kitt Peak	Spacewatch	EOS	2.5 km	MPC · JPL
341729	2007 VJ_{229}	—	November 7, 2007	Kitt Peak	Spacewatch	·	2.1 km	MPC · JPL
341730	2007 VN_{232}	—	November 7, 2007	Kitt Peak	Spacewatch	·	3.0 km	MPC · JPL
341731	2007 VR_{232}	—	November 7, 2007	Kitt Peak	Spacewatch	·	2.0 km	MPC · JPL
341732	2007 VL_{240}	—	November 7, 2007	Catalina	CSS	·	2.8 km	MPC · JPL
341733	2007 VN_{241}	—	November 12, 2007	Catalina	CSS	·	2.3 km	MPC · JPL
341734	2007 VT_{243}	—	November 13, 2007	Dauban	Chante-Perdrix	·	3.7 km	MPC · JPL
341735	2007 VQ_{245}	—	November 8, 2007	Catalina	CSS	EOS	2.4 km	MPC · JPL
341736	2007 VG_{250}	—	November 14, 2007	Mount Lemmon	Mount Lemmon Survey	·	5.0 km	MPC · JPL
341737	2007 VF_{252}	—	November 12, 2007	Catalina	CSS	·	2.2 km	MPC · JPL
341738	2007 VK_{254}	—	November 15, 2007	Catalina	CSS	·	2.9 km	MPC · JPL
341739	2007 VK_{255}	—	November 12, 2007	Mount Lemmon	Mount Lemmon Survey	EOS	2.6 km	MPC · JPL
341740	2007 VQ_{257}	—	November 13, 2007	Catalina	CSS	·	2.4 km	MPC · JPL
341741	2007 VG_{265}	—	November 13, 2007	Kitt Peak	Spacewatch	·	2.6 km	MPC · JPL
341742	2007 VB_{266}	—	November 13, 2007	Kitt Peak	Spacewatch	·	4.0 km	MPC · JPL
341743	2007 VB_{267}	—	November 11, 2007	Cerro Burek	Burek, Cerro	TIR	3.3 km	MPC · JPL
341744	2007 VL_{267}	—	November 14, 2007	Bisei SG Center	BATTeRS	·	1.9 km	MPC · JPL
341745	2007 VR_{268}	—	November 12, 2007	Socorro	LINEAR	·	2.5 km	MPC · JPL
341746	2007 VD_{270}	—	November 8, 2007	Kitt Peak	Spacewatch	·	3.8 km	MPC · JPL
341747	2007 VJ_{275}	—	November 13, 2007	Kitt Peak	Spacewatch	THM	1.9 km	MPC · JPL
341748	2007 VU_{275}	—	November 13, 2007	Kitt Peak	Spacewatch	·	3.6 km	MPC · JPL
341749	2007 VF_{280}	—	November 14, 2007	Kitt Peak	Spacewatch	EOS	2.0 km	MPC · JPL
341750	2007 VM_{284}	—	November 14, 2007	Kitt Peak	Spacewatch	EOS	2.3 km	MPC · JPL
341751	2007 VS_{286}	—	November 14, 2007	Kitt Peak	Spacewatch	HYG	2.8 km	MPC · JPL
341752	2007 VZ_{294}	—	November 15, 2007	Anderson Mesa	LONEOS	EOS	2.1 km	MPC · JPL
341753	2007 VG_{297}	—	October 8, 2007	Anderson Mesa	LONEOS	·	4.1 km	MPC · JPL
341754	2007 VD_{301}	—	November 15, 2007	Catalina	CSS	·	3.0 km	MPC · JPL
341755	2007 VB_{303}	—	November 3, 2007	Catalina	CSS	WAT	2.0 km	MPC · JPL
341756	2007 VL_{306}	—	November 1, 2007	Kitt Peak	Spacewatch	·	3.6 km	MPC · JPL
341757	2007 VD_{311}	—	November 1, 2007	Kitt Peak	Spacewatch	·	2.3 km	MPC · JPL
341758	2007 VJ_{311}	—	November 5, 2007	Purple Mountain	PMO NEO Survey Program	·	3.7 km	MPC · JPL
341759	2007 VN_{313}	—	November 9, 2007	Catalina	CSS	·	3.6 km	MPC · JPL
341760	2007 VE_{315}	—	November 4, 2007	Kitt Peak	Spacewatch	HYG	3.6 km	MPC · JPL
341761	2007 VJ_{319}	—	November 4, 2007	Kitt Peak	Spacewatch	EOS	2.3 km	MPC · JPL
341762	2007 VS_{321}	—	November 5, 2007	Kitt Peak	Spacewatch	·	4.0 km	MPC · JPL
341763	2007 VK_{326}	—	November 4, 2007	Socorro	LINEAR	·	2.6 km	MPC · JPL
341764	2007 VZ_{326}	—	November 5, 2007	Kitt Peak	Spacewatch	·	2.6 km	MPC · JPL
341765	2007 VF_{328}	—	November 8, 2007	Catalina	CSS	EMA	5.0 km	MPC · JPL
341766	2007 VY_{329}	—	November 2, 2007	Socorro	LINEAR	·	2.9 km	MPC · JPL
341767	2007 VC_{330}	—	November 2, 2007	Kitt Peak	Spacewatch	·	2.3 km	MPC · JPL
341768	2007 VZ_{330}	—	November 5, 2007	Mount Lemmon	Mount Lemmon Survey	·	2.8 km	MPC · JPL
341769	2007 VG_{333}	—	November 9, 2007	Kitt Peak	Spacewatch	·	2.5 km	MPC · JPL
341770	2007 VX_{334}	—	July 22, 1995	Kitt Peak	Spacewatch	THM	2.6 km	MPC · JPL
341771	2007 VA_{335}	—	August 14, 2006	Siding Spring	SSS	·	3.6 km	MPC · JPL
341772	2007 VB_{335}	—	November 14, 2007	Kitt Peak	Spacewatch	·	3.1 km	MPC · JPL
341773	2007 WZ_{1}	—	November 17, 2007	Bisei SG Center	BATTeRS	·	2.6 km	MPC · JPL
341774	2007 WG_{3}	—	November 16, 2007	Mount Lemmon	Mount Lemmon Survey	·	2.5 km	MPC · JPL
341775	2007 WE_{7}	—	November 18, 2007	Socorro	LINEAR	·	2.6 km	MPC · JPL
341776	2007 WV_{7}	—	November 18, 2007	Socorro	LINEAR	·	2.5 km	MPC · JPL
341777	2007 WC_{8}	—	November 18, 2007	Socorro	LINEAR	TIR	3.1 km	MPC · JPL
341778	2007 WH_{8}	—	November 18, 2007	Socorro	LINEAR	LIX	3.5 km	MPC · JPL
341779	2007 WS_{23}	—	November 18, 2007	Mount Lemmon	Mount Lemmon Survey	·	1.9 km	MPC · JPL
341780	2007 WS_{24}	—	November 2, 2007	Kitt Peak	Spacewatch	·	2.1 km	MPC · JPL
341781	2007 WX_{30}	—	November 19, 2007	Kitt Peak	Spacewatch	·	3.4 km	MPC · JPL
341782	2007 WF_{37}	—	November 19, 2007	Mount Lemmon	Mount Lemmon Survey	·	2.7 km	MPC · JPL
341783	2007 WP_{37}	—	November 19, 2007	Mount Lemmon	Mount Lemmon Survey	·	5.4 km	MPC · JPL
341784	2007 WS_{41}	—	October 15, 2007	Mount Lemmon	Mount Lemmon Survey	·	2.0 km	MPC · JPL
341785	2007 WU_{42}	—	November 19, 2007	Kitt Peak	Spacewatch	·	2.8 km	MPC · JPL
341786	2007 WD_{45}	—	November 20, 2007	Mount Lemmon	Mount Lemmon Survey	VER	6.1 km	MPC · JPL
341787	2007 WY_{47}	—	November 20, 2007	Mount Lemmon	Mount Lemmon Survey	EOS	3.7 km	MPC · JPL
341788	2007 WM_{48}	—	November 20, 2007	Mount Lemmon	Mount Lemmon Survey	·	4.5 km	MPC · JPL
341789	2007 WJ_{58}	—	November 20, 2007	Kitt Peak	Spacewatch	·	3.1 km	MPC · JPL
341790	2007 WG_{59}	—	November 20, 2007	Kitt Peak	Spacewatch	EOS	2.3 km	MPC · JPL
341791	2007 WM_{61}	—	November 18, 2007	Kitt Peak	Spacewatch	·	5.2 km	MPC · JPL
341792	2007 XN_{6}	—	December 4, 2007	Catalina	CSS	·	6.3 km	MPC · JPL
341793	2007 XL_{10}	—	December 5, 2007	Bisei SG Center	BATTeRS	·	3.0 km	MPC · JPL
341794	2007 XV_{11}	—	December 4, 2007	Kitt Peak	Spacewatch	·	3.1 km	MPC · JPL
341795	2007 XF_{15}	—	December 6, 2007	La Sagra	OAM	·	2.5 km	MPC · JPL
341796	2007 XD_{20}	—	December 4, 2007	Catalina	CSS	·	4.3 km	MPC · JPL
341797	2007 XK_{21}	—	December 10, 2007	Socorro	LINEAR	·	4.1 km	MPC · JPL
341798	2007 XU_{22}	—	December 12, 2007	Socorro	LINEAR	·	2.5 km	MPC · JPL
341799	2007 XF_{23}	—	December 13, 2007	Dauban	Chante-Perdrix	THM	2.5 km	MPC · JPL
341800	2007 XP_{25}	—	December 14, 2007	La Sagra	OAM	·	2.8 km	MPC · JPL

== 341801–341900 ==
back to top

Designation			Discovery			Properties		Ref
Permanent	Provisional	Named after	Date	Site	Discoverer(s)	Category	Diam.	Ref
341801	2007 XQ_{27}	—	December 14, 2007	Kitt Peak	Spacewatch	THM	2.8 km	MPC · JPL
341802	2007 XG_{29}	—	December 15, 2007	Mount Lemmon	Mount Lemmon Survey	NAE	2.1 km	MPC · JPL
341803	2007 XL_{32}	—	October 25, 2007	Mount Lemmon	Mount Lemmon Survey	·	1.9 km	MPC · JPL
341804	2007 XC_{35}	—	December 13, 2007	Socorro	LINEAR	·	3.1 km	MPC · JPL
341805	2007 XT_{35}	—	December 13, 2007	Socorro	LINEAR	·	3.1 km	MPC · JPL
341806	2007 XA_{37}	—	December 13, 2007	Socorro	LINEAR	·	4.0 km	MPC · JPL
341807	2007 XS_{41}	—	December 15, 2007	Socorro	LINEAR	·	4.3 km	MPC · JPL
341808	2007 XF_{43}	—	December 15, 2007	Kitt Peak	Spacewatch	·	2.7 km	MPC · JPL
341809	2007 XE_{44}	—	December 15, 2007	Kitt Peak	Spacewatch	·	2.0 km	MPC · JPL
341810	2007 XQ_{49}	—	December 15, 2007	Kitt Peak	Spacewatch	·	3.1 km	MPC · JPL
341811	2007 XS_{49}	—	December 15, 2007	Kitt Peak	Spacewatch	·	2.8 km	MPC · JPL
341812	2007 XB_{55}	—	December 5, 2007	Kitt Peak	Spacewatch	THM	2.1 km	MPC · JPL
341813	2007 XH_{57}	—	September 28, 2001	Palomar	NEAT	·	2.9 km	MPC · JPL
341814	2007 XR_{57}	—	October 11, 2006	Palomar	NEAT	·	4.3 km	MPC · JPL
341815	2007 XY_{57}	—	December 5, 2007	Socorro	LINEAR	EOS	2.5 km	MPC · JPL
341816	2007 YK	—	December 16, 2007	Catalina	CSS	AMO +1km	1.1 km	MPC · JPL
341817	2007 YV_{2}	—	December 17, 2007	Bergisch Gladbach	W. Bickel	·	2.6 km	MPC · JPL
341818	2007 YX_{16}	—	December 16, 2007	Kitt Peak	Spacewatch	·	3.5 km	MPC · JPL
341819	2007 YE_{32}	—	December 28, 2007	Kitt Peak	Spacewatch	·	5.5 km	MPC · JPL
341820	2007 YT_{51}	—	December 30, 2007	Kitt Peak	Spacewatch	·	3.5 km	MPC · JPL
341821	2007 YS_{52}	—	December 30, 2007	Catalina	CSS	HYG	2.9 km	MPC · JPL
341822	2007 YW_{65}	—	December 30, 2007	Kitt Peak	Spacewatch	·	2.5 km	MPC · JPL
341823	2007 YB_{69}	—	December 17, 2007	Kitt Peak	Spacewatch	THM	2.6 km	MPC · JPL
341824	2008 AZ_{5}	—	March 17, 2004	Kitt Peak	Spacewatch	·	1.8 km	MPC · JPL
341825	2008 AE_{22}	—	January 10, 2008	Mount Lemmon	Mount Lemmon Survey	SYL · CYB	4.9 km	MPC · JPL
341826 Aurelbaier	2008 AC_{30}	Aurelbaier	January 10, 2008	Marly	P. Kocher	TIR	3.1 km	MPC · JPL
341827	2008 AH_{87}	—	January 12, 2008	Mount Lemmon	Mount Lemmon Survey	·	2.8 km	MPC · JPL
341828	2008 BK_{2}	—	January 18, 2008	Pla D'Arguines	R. Ferrando	LIX	3.7 km	MPC · JPL
341829	2008 BF_{39}	—	January 30, 2008	Catalina	CSS	·	5.5 km	MPC · JPL
341830	2008 CY_{53}	—	February 7, 2008	Catalina	CSS	HIL · 3:2	8.0 km	MPC · JPL
341831	2008 CU_{64}	—	February 8, 2008	Mount Lemmon	Mount Lemmon Survey	3:2	6.3 km	MPC · JPL
341832	2008 CP_{72}	—	February 9, 2008	Črni Vrh	H. Mikuž, B. Mikuž	H	600 m	MPC · JPL
341833	2008 CS_{89}	—	February 8, 2008	Kitt Peak	Spacewatch	THM	2.3 km	MPC · JPL
341834	2008 CY_{106}	—	February 9, 2008	Mount Lemmon	Mount Lemmon Survey	EOS	2.1 km	MPC · JPL
341835	2008 CB_{136}	—	February 8, 2008	Mount Lemmon	Mount Lemmon Survey	3:2 · SHU	5.5 km	MPC · JPL
341836	2008 CH_{144}	—	February 9, 2008	Mount Lemmon	Mount Lemmon Survey	EOS	2.3 km	MPC · JPL
341837	2008 CT_{200}	—	February 8, 2008	Kitt Peak	Spacewatch	·	870 m	MPC · JPL
341838	2008 CW_{205}	—	February 2, 2008	Mount Lemmon	Mount Lemmon Survey	3:2	4.9 km	MPC · JPL
341839	2008 DP_{5}	—	February 27, 2008	Mayhill	Dillon, W. G.	·	2.5 km	MPC · JPL
341840	2008 DR_{49}	—	February 29, 2008	Mount Lemmon	Mount Lemmon Survey	H	570 m	MPC · JPL
341841	2008 DN_{52}	—	February 29, 2008	Mount Lemmon	Mount Lemmon Survey	HIL · 3:2	6.4 km	MPC · JPL
341842	2008 DG_{79}	—	February 27, 2008	Catalina	CSS	3:2	6.6 km	MPC · JPL
341843	2008 EV_{5}	—	March 4, 2008	Mount Lemmon	Mount Lemmon Survey	ATE · PHA	400 m	MPC · JPL
341844	2008 EF_{29}	—	March 4, 2008	Mount Lemmon	Mount Lemmon Survey	3:2 · SHU	6.5 km	MPC · JPL
341845	2008 EQ_{39}	—	March 4, 2008	Kitt Peak	Spacewatch	L5	10 km	MPC · JPL
341846	2008 EV_{55}	—	March 7, 2008	Mount Lemmon	Mount Lemmon Survey	CYB	3.9 km	MPC · JPL
341847	2008 EC_{121}	—	March 9, 2008	Kitt Peak	Spacewatch	·	820 m	MPC · JPL
341848	2008 EV_{147}	—	March 1, 2008	Kitt Peak	Spacewatch	·	790 m	MPC · JPL
341849	2008 FT_{20}	—	March 27, 2008	Kitt Peak	Spacewatch	·	710 m	MPC · JPL
341850	2008 FM_{21}	—	March 27, 2008	Kitt Peak	Spacewatch	(883)	790 m	MPC · JPL
341851	2008 FC_{30}	—	February 24, 2008	Kitt Peak	Spacewatch	·	620 m	MPC · JPL
341852	2008 FQ_{50}	—	March 28, 2008	Kitt Peak	Spacewatch	·	730 m	MPC · JPL
341853	2008 FH_{57}	—	March 28, 2008	Mount Lemmon	Mount Lemmon Survey	·	940 m	MPC · JPL
341854	2008 FO_{63}	—	March 27, 2008	Kitt Peak	Spacewatch	L5	11 km	MPC · JPL
341855	2008 FF_{79}	—	March 27, 2008	Mount Lemmon	Mount Lemmon Survey	·	1.1 km	MPC · JPL
341856	2008 FN_{94}	—	March 29, 2008	Kitt Peak	Spacewatch	L5	8.5 km	MPC · JPL
341857	2008 FV_{100}	—	March 30, 2008	Kitt Peak	Spacewatch	L5	9.3 km	MPC · JPL
341858	2008 FQ_{112}	—	March 31, 2008	Kitt Peak	Spacewatch	·	700 m	MPC · JPL
341859	2008 FW_{112}	—	March 31, 2008	Kitt Peak	Spacewatch	·	660 m	MPC · JPL
341860	2008 FM_{117}	—	March 31, 2008	Kitt Peak	Spacewatch	·	740 m	MPC · JPL
341861	2008 FA_{118}	—	March 31, 2008	Kitt Peak	Spacewatch	L5	11 km	MPC · JPL
341862	2008 FC_{124}	—	March 29, 2008	Kitt Peak	Spacewatch	·	760 m	MPC · JPL
341863	2008 FB_{126}	—	March 29, 2008	Kitt Peak	Spacewatch	L5	11 km	MPC · JPL
341864	2008 FE_{130}	—	March 29, 2008	Kitt Peak	Spacewatch	·	840 m	MPC · JPL
341865	2008 FA_{132}	—	March 29, 2008	Kitt Peak	Spacewatch	L5	9.5 km	MPC · JPL
341866	2008 FS_{132}	—	February 2, 2008	Mount Lemmon	Mount Lemmon Survey	·	680 m	MPC · JPL
341867	2008 FL_{134}	—	March 29, 2008	Kitt Peak	Spacewatch	L5 · (291316) · 010	9.4 km	MPC · JPL
341868	2008 GU_{1}	—	April 4, 2008	Wrightwood	J. W. Young	·	930 m	MPC · JPL
341869	2008 GW_{6}	—	April 1, 2008	Kitt Peak	Spacewatch	L5	13 km	MPC · JPL
341870	2008 GS_{31}	—	April 3, 2008	Kitt Peak	Spacewatch	L5	15 km	MPC · JPL
341871	2008 GH_{38}	—	April 3, 2008	Mount Lemmon	Mount Lemmon Survey	·	590 m	MPC · JPL
341872	2008 GW_{44}	—	April 4, 2008	Kitt Peak	Spacewatch	L5	9.4 km	MPC · JPL
341873	2008 GT_{45}	—	April 4, 2008	Kitt Peak	Spacewatch	·	940 m	MPC · JPL
341874	2008 GB_{53}	—	April 5, 2008	Mount Lemmon	Mount Lemmon Survey	·	680 m	MPC · JPL
341875	2008 GX_{56}	—	April 5, 2008	Mount Lemmon	Mount Lemmon Survey	L5	9.6 km	MPC · JPL
341876	2008 GW_{77}	—	April 7, 2008	Kitt Peak	Spacewatch	·	660 m	MPC · JPL
341877	2008 GA_{78}	—	April 7, 2008	Kitt Peak	Spacewatch	L5	9.5 km	MPC · JPL
341878	2008 GL_{86}	—	April 9, 2008	Kitt Peak	Spacewatch	·	670 m	MPC · JPL
341879	2008 GT_{86}	—	April 9, 2008	Mount Lemmon	Mount Lemmon Survey	·	840 m	MPC · JPL
341880	2008 GT_{87}	—	April 5, 2008	Mount Lemmon	Mount Lemmon Survey	L5	16 km	MPC · JPL
341881	2008 GM_{94}	—	April 7, 2008	Kitt Peak	Spacewatch	L5	9.4 km	MPC · JPL
341882	2008 GA_{101}	—	April 9, 2008	Kitt Peak	Spacewatch	·	870 m	MPC · JPL
341883	2008 GS_{104}	—	April 11, 2008	Kitt Peak	Spacewatch	HIL · 3:2 · (6124)	6.5 km	MPC · JPL
341884	2008 GA_{120}	—	July 30, 2005	Palomar	NEAT	·	700 m	MPC · JPL
341885	2008 GB_{131}	—	April 7, 2008	Kitt Peak	Spacewatch	·	600 m	MPC · JPL
341886	2008 GG_{132}	—	April 10, 2008	Kitt Peak	Spacewatch	L5	9.5 km	MPC · JPL
341887	2008 GM_{133}	—	April 3, 2008	Kitt Peak	Spacewatch	·	750 m	MPC · JPL
341888	2008 GT_{143}	—	April 14, 2008	Mount Lemmon	Mount Lemmon Survey	L5	8.5 km	MPC · JPL
341889	2008 HF	—	April 16, 2008	Mount Lemmon	Mount Lemmon Survey	H	830 m	MPC · JPL
341890	2008 HK_{12}	—	April 1, 2008	Kitt Peak	Spacewatch	V	790 m	MPC · JPL
341891	2008 HK_{18}	—	March 31, 2008	Mount Lemmon	Mount Lemmon Survey	L5	9.3 km	MPC · JPL
341892	2008 HM_{20}	—	April 26, 2008	Mount Lemmon	Mount Lemmon Survey	L5	9.4 km	MPC · JPL
341893	2008 HF_{21}	—	April 26, 2008	Kitt Peak	Spacewatch	·	610 m	MPC · JPL
341894	2008 HR_{21}	—	April 26, 2008	Mount Lemmon	Mount Lemmon Survey	L5	13 km	MPC · JPL
341895	2008 HW_{21}	—	April 26, 2008	Mount Lemmon	Mount Lemmon Survey	·	770 m	MPC · JPL
341896	2008 HR_{36}	—	April 30, 2008	Kitt Peak	Spacewatch	fast	1.2 km	MPC · JPL
341897	2008 HJ_{43}	—	April 27, 2008	Mount Lemmon	Mount Lemmon Survey	L5	7.7 km	MPC · JPL
341898	2008 HJ_{51}	—	April 29, 2008	Kitt Peak	Spacewatch	·	730 m	MPC · JPL
341899	2008 HK_{53}	—	April 29, 2008	Kitt Peak	Spacewatch	·	920 m	MPC · JPL
341900	2008 HE_{54}	—	April 29, 2008	Kitt Peak	Spacewatch	L5	10 km	MPC · JPL

== 341901–342000 ==
back to top

Designation			Discovery			Properties		Ref
Permanent	Provisional	Named after	Date	Site	Discoverer(s)	Category	Diam.	Ref
341901	2008 HN_{55}	—	April 29, 2008	Kitt Peak	Spacewatch	·	1.0 km	MPC · JPL
341902	2008 HX_{59}	—	April 27, 2008	Mount Lemmon	Mount Lemmon Survey	·	860 m	MPC · JPL
341903	2008 HP_{61}	—	April 30, 2008	Mount Lemmon	Mount Lemmon Survey	·	780 m	MPC · JPL
341904	2008 HJ_{70}	—	April 24, 2008	Kitt Peak	Spacewatch	·	950 m	MPC · JPL
341905	2008 JQ_{6}	—	May 2, 2008	Kitt Peak	Spacewatch	·	770 m	MPC · JPL
341906	2008 JC_{8}	—	May 3, 2008	Socorro	LINEAR	PHO	3.0 km	MPC · JPL
341907	2008 JF_{10}	—	May 3, 2008	Kitt Peak	Spacewatch	·	790 m	MPC · JPL
341908	2008 JV_{13}	—	May 6, 2008	Mount Lemmon	Mount Lemmon Survey	·	1 km	MPC · JPL
341909	2008 JU_{16}	—	May 3, 2008	Mount Lemmon	Mount Lemmon Survey	L5	8.8 km	MPC · JPL
341910	2008 JU_{20}	—	May 9, 2008	Grove Creek	Tozzi, F.	·	830 m	MPC · JPL
341911	2008 JB_{29}	—	May 11, 2008	Catalina	CSS	PHO	1.1 km	MPC · JPL
341912	2008 JA_{32}	—	May 5, 2008	Mount Lemmon	Mount Lemmon Survey	·	2.3 km	MPC · JPL
341913	2008 JZ_{32}	—	May 8, 2008	Mount Lemmon	Mount Lemmon Survey	·	2.5 km	MPC · JPL
341914	2008 KH_{1}	—	May 26, 2008	Kitt Peak	Spacewatch	·	890 m	MPC · JPL
341915	2008 KA_{2}	—	May 26, 2008	Kitt Peak	Spacewatch	LIX	4.3 km	MPC · JPL
341916	2008 KD_{2}	—	May 26, 2008	Kitt Peak	Spacewatch	(2076)	980 m	MPC · JPL
341917	2008 KV_{8}	—	May 27, 2008	Kitt Peak	Spacewatch	L5	8.6 km	MPC · JPL
341918	2008 KX_{17}	—	May 2, 2008	Kitt Peak	Spacewatch	·	630 m	MPC · JPL
341919	2008 KD_{18}	—	May 28, 2008	Kitt Peak	Spacewatch	L5	12 km	MPC · JPL
341920	2008 KZ_{19}	—	May 28, 2008	Mount Lemmon	Mount Lemmon Survey	·	680 m	MPC · JPL
341921	2008 KB_{20}	—	May 28, 2008	Mount Lemmon	Mount Lemmon Survey	·	870 m	MPC · JPL
341922	2008 KH_{35}	—	May 27, 2008	Kitt Peak	Spacewatch	L5	8.7 km	MPC · JPL
341923	2008 KZ_{37}	—	May 30, 2008	Kitt Peak	Spacewatch	L5	11 km	MPC · JPL
341924	2008 KL_{40}	—	May 31, 2008	Grove Creek	Tozzi, F.	·	740 m	MPC · JPL
341925	2008 KD_{43}	—	May 27, 2008	Kitt Peak	Spacewatch	L5	10 km	MPC · JPL
341926	2008 LW	—	April 1, 2008	Kitt Peak	Spacewatch	L5	7.4 km	MPC · JPL
341927	2008 LF_{5}	—	June 3, 2008	Mount Lemmon	Mount Lemmon Survey	·	1.6 km	MPC · JPL
341928	2008 LZ_{5}	—	June 3, 2008	Kitt Peak	Spacewatch	L5	18 km	MPC · JPL
341929	2008 MC_{4}	—	June 30, 2008	Kitt Peak	Spacewatch	·	1.5 km	MPC · JPL
341930	2008 NR_{2}	—	July 10, 2008	La Sagra	OAM	·	1.7 km	MPC · JPL
341931	2008 NH_{3}	—	July 10, 2008	Črni Vrh	Skvarč, J.	·	1.0 km	MPC · JPL
341932	2008 OU	—	June 2, 2008	Mount Lemmon	Mount Lemmon Survey	·	1.4 km	MPC · JPL
341933	2008 OZ_{2}	—	July 28, 2008	Hibiscus	S. F. Hönig, Teamo, N.	·	830 m	MPC · JPL
341934	2008 OK_{7}	—	July 29, 2008	Mount Lemmon	Mount Lemmon Survey	·	1.3 km	MPC · JPL
341935	2008 OR_{8}	—	July 28, 2008	Dauban	Kugel, F.	·	1.2 km	MPC · JPL
341936	2008 OD_{9}	—	July 28, 2008	Hibiscus	S. F. Hönig, Teamo, N.	MAS	920 m	MPC · JPL
341937	2008 OG_{9}	—	July 29, 2008	La Sagra	OAM	·	1.1 km	MPC · JPL
341938	2008 OT_{10}	—	July 30, 2008	Calvin-Rehoboth	L. A. Molnar	·	1.2 km	MPC · JPL
341939	2008 OE_{14}	—	July 31, 2008	Socorro	LINEAR	·	1.5 km	MPC · JPL
341940	2008 OB_{18}	—	July 30, 2008	Kitt Peak	Spacewatch	V	750 m	MPC · JPL
341941	2008 OK_{24}	—	July 30, 2008	Catalina	CSS	·	1.7 km	MPC · JPL
341942	2008 OV_{24}	—	July 28, 2008	Siding Spring	SSS	NYS	1.6 km	MPC · JPL
341943	2008 OG_{25}	—	July 26, 2008	Siding Spring	SSS	·	1.7 km	MPC · JPL
341944	2008 PC	—	August 1, 2008	Hibiscus	S. F. Hönig, Teamo, N.	V	830 m	MPC · JPL
341945	2008 PE	—	August 1, 2008	Hibiscus	S. F. Hönig, Teamo, N.	NYS	1.4 km	MPC · JPL
341946	2008 PW	—	August 1, 2008	Socorro	LINEAR	·	1.6 km	MPC · JPL
341947	2008 PC_{1}	—	August 1, 2008	La Sagra	OAM	·	1.4 km	MPC · JPL
341948	2008 PH_{2}	—	August 2, 2008	La Sagra	OAM	PHO	2.7 km	MPC · JPL
341949	2008 PD_{3}	—	August 3, 2008	Dauban	Kugel, F.	MAS	810 m	MPC · JPL
341950	2008 PT_{4}	—	August 4, 2008	Siding Spring	SSS	·	1.3 km	MPC · JPL
341951	2008 PK_{5}	—	August 5, 2008	La Sagra	OAM	·	1.9 km	MPC · JPL
341952	2008 PY_{11}	—	August 10, 2008	Pla D'Arguines	R. Ferrando	·	1.2 km	MPC · JPL
341953	2008 PU_{15}	—	August 11, 2008	Pla D'Arguines	R. Ferrando	NYS	1.1 km	MPC · JPL
341954	2008 PS_{19}	—	August 7, 2008	Kitt Peak	Spacewatch	MAS	660 m	MPC · JPL
341955	2008 PH_{20}	—	August 5, 2008	Siding Spring	SSS	PHO	1.2 km	MPC · JPL
341956	2008 PQ_{20}	—	August 3, 2008	Siding Spring	SSS	·	1.6 km	MPC · JPL
341957	2008 PV_{20}	—	August 6, 2008	Siding Spring	SSS	·	1.7 km	MPC · JPL
341958 Chrétien	2008 PW_{21}	Chrétien	August 3, 2008	Eygalayes	Sogorb, P.	·	1.5 km	MPC · JPL
341959	2008 QM	—	August 21, 2008	Piszkéstető	K. Sárneczky	MAS	730 m	MPC · JPL
341960	2008 QJ_{1}	—	August 23, 2008	La Sagra	OAM	·	1.4 km	MPC · JPL
341961	2008 QL_{1}	—	August 23, 2008	La Sagra	OAM	MAS	860 m	MPC · JPL
341962	2008 QU_{1}	—	August 24, 2008	La Sagra	OAM	EUN	1.1 km	MPC · JPL
341963	2008 QX_{1}	—	August 24, 2008	La Sagra	OAM	·	1.3 km	MPC · JPL
341964	2008 QU_{6}	—	August 21, 2008	Kitt Peak	Spacewatch	·	1.2 km	MPC · JPL
341965	2008 QV_{6}	—	August 21, 2008	Kitt Peak	Spacewatch	V	870 m	MPC · JPL
341966	2008 QS_{10}	—	August 26, 2008	La Sagra	OAM	·	1.2 km	MPC · JPL
341967	2008 QW_{13}	—	January 30, 2006	Kitt Peak	Spacewatch	·	810 m	MPC · JPL
341968	2008 QH_{14}	—	August 21, 2008	Kitt Peak	Spacewatch	·	1.4 km	MPC · JPL
341969	2008 QT_{15}	—	August 28, 2008	Dauban	Kugel, F.	NYS	1.4 km	MPC · JPL
341970	2008 QA_{16}	—	August 21, 2008	Kitt Peak	Spacewatch	·	1.3 km	MPC · JPL
341971	2008 QN_{17}	—	August 27, 2008	La Sagra	OAM	·	1.6 km	MPC · JPL
341972	2008 QO_{20}	—	August 25, 2008	Socorro	LINEAR	·	2.6 km	MPC · JPL
341973	2008 QO_{26}	—	August 29, 2008	La Sagra	OAM	·	1.5 km	MPC · JPL
341974	2008 QZ_{30}	—	August 30, 2008	Socorro	LINEAR	·	1.5 km	MPC · JPL
341975	2008 QV_{36}	—	August 21, 2008	Kitt Peak	Spacewatch	·	990 m	MPC · JPL
341976	2008 QD_{37}	—	August 21, 2008	Kitt Peak	Spacewatch	NYS	1.2 km	MPC · JPL
341977	2008 QC_{38}	—	August 23, 2008	Kitt Peak	Spacewatch	EUN	930 m	MPC · JPL
341978	2008 QU_{38}	—	August 24, 2008	Kitt Peak	Spacewatch	EUN	1.6 km	MPC · JPL
341979	2008 QF_{39}	—	August 24, 2008	Kitt Peak	Spacewatch	·	1.6 km	MPC · JPL
341980	2008 QZ_{39}	—	August 26, 2008	La Sagra	OAM	·	1.5 km	MPC · JPL
341981	2008 QF_{40}	—	August 27, 2008	La Sagra	OAM	NYS	1.2 km	MPC · JPL
341982	2008 QR_{40}	—	August 24, 2008	Kitt Peak	Spacewatch	·	1.3 km	MPC · JPL
341983	2008 QV_{40}	—	August 24, 2008	Kitt Peak	Spacewatch	·	3.1 km	MPC · JPL
341984	2008 QP_{44}	—	August 23, 2008	Kitt Peak	Spacewatch	·	1.3 km	MPC · JPL
341985	2008 QT_{45}	—	August 24, 2008	Socorro	LINEAR	·	1.5 km	MPC · JPL
341986	2008 QS_{46}	—	August 26, 2008	Socorro	LINEAR	V	780 m	MPC · JPL
341987	2008 QG_{47}	—	August 23, 2008	Socorro	LINEAR	·	1.1 km	MPC · JPL
341988	2008 QH_{47}	—	August 24, 2008	Kitt Peak	Spacewatch	·	1.4 km	MPC · JPL
341989	2008 RL_{2}	—	September 2, 2008	Kitt Peak	Spacewatch	·	2.4 km	MPC · JPL
341990	2008 RT_{2}	—	September 2, 2008	Kitt Peak	Spacewatch	·	1.6 km	MPC · JPL
341991	2008 RB_{4}	—	September 2, 2008	Kitt Peak	Spacewatch	NYS	1.4 km	MPC · JPL
341992	2008 RE_{9}	—	September 3, 2008	Kitt Peak	Spacewatch	·	1.1 km	MPC · JPL
341993	2008 RP_{10}	—	September 3, 2008	Kitt Peak	Spacewatch	·	1.4 km	MPC · JPL
341994	2008 RP_{16}	—	September 4, 2008	Kitt Peak	Spacewatch	·	1.2 km	MPC · JPL
341995	2008 RA_{21}	—	September 4, 2008	Kitt Peak	Spacewatch	·	780 m	MPC · JPL
341996	2008 RH_{21}	—	September 4, 2008	Kitt Peak	Spacewatch	·	940 m	MPC · JPL
341997	2008 RO_{22}	—	September 3, 2008	La Sagra	OAM	·	1.3 km	MPC · JPL
341998	2008 RC_{24}	—	September 5, 2008	Socorro	LINEAR	·	2.8 km	MPC · JPL
341999	2008 RT_{25}	—	September 5, 2008	Needville	J. Dellinger, Sexton, C.	PHO	2.4 km	MPC · JPL
342000 Neumünster	2008 RV_{26}	Neumünster	September 2, 2008	Altschwendt	W. Ries	·	1.1 km	MPC · JPL

back to top

== See also ==
- Meanings of minor-planet names: 341001–342000
