= List of minor planets: 414001–415000 =

The following is a partial list of minor planets, running from minor-planet number 414001 through 415000, inclusive. The primary data for this and other partial lists is based on JPL's "Small-Body Orbital Elements" and data available from the Minor Planet Center. Critical list information is also provided by the MPC, unless otherwise specified from Lowell Observatory. A detailed description of the table's columns and additional sources are given on the main page including a complete list of every page in this series, and a statistical break-up on the dynamical classification of minor planets.

Also see the summary list of all named bodies in numerical and alphabetical order, and the corresponding naming citations for the number range of this particular list. New namings may only be added to this list after official publication, as the preannouncement of names is condemned by the Working Group for Small Bodies Nomenclature of the International Astronomical Union.

Near-Earth obj.	MBA (inner)	MBA (outer)	Centaur
Mars-crosser	MBA (middle)	Jupiter trojan	Trans-Neptunian obj.
Unclassified

== 414001–414100 ==
Designation			Discovery			Properties		Ref
Permanent	Provisional	Named after	Date	Site	Discoverer(s)	Category	Diam.	Ref
414001	2007 FQ_{23}	—	March 20, 2007	Kitt Peak	Spacewatch	·	2.7 km	MPC · JPL
414002	2007 FP_{48}	—	March 26, 2007	Mount Lemmon	Mount Lemmon Survey	MRX	910 m	MPC · JPL
414003	2007 FC_{49}	—	March 26, 2007	Kitt Peak	Spacewatch	·	1.9 km	MPC · JPL
414004	2007 GP_{17}	—	April 11, 2007	Kitt Peak	Spacewatch	EOS	1.8 km	MPC · JPL
414005	2007 GR_{27}	—	March 15, 2007	Kitt Peak	Spacewatch	GAL	1.5 km	MPC · JPL
414006	2007 GO_{32}	—	April 8, 2007	Kitt Peak	Spacewatch	BRA	1.6 km	MPC · JPL
414007	2007 GJ_{46}	—	April 14, 2007	Kitt Peak	Spacewatch	TIR	3.2 km	MPC · JPL
414008	2007 GN_{49}	—	April 15, 2007	Socorro	LINEAR	·	1.7 km	MPC · JPL
414009	2007 GR_{57}	—	April 15, 2007	Kitt Peak	Spacewatch	·	2.6 km	MPC · JPL
414010	2007 GJ_{71}	—	April 14, 2007	Kitt Peak	Spacewatch	·	3.4 km	MPC · JPL
414011	2007 GO_{73}	—	April 15, 2007	Catalina	CSS	DOR	2.4 km	MPC · JPL
414012	2007 GT_{74}	—	March 26, 2007	Mount Lemmon	Mount Lemmon Survey	·	1.7 km	MPC · JPL
414013	2007 HZ_{33}	—	April 19, 2007	Kitt Peak	Spacewatch	·	1.5 km	MPC · JPL
414014	2007 HB_{36}	—	April 19, 2007	Kitt Peak	Spacewatch	·	1.7 km	MPC · JPL
414015	2007 HN_{41}	—	April 20, 2007	Kitt Peak	Spacewatch	EMA	3.5 km	MPC · JPL
414016	2007 HZ_{44}	—	March 13, 2007	Mount Lemmon	Mount Lemmon Survey	615	1.4 km	MPC · JPL
414017	2007 HG_{64}	—	April 22, 2007	Mount Lemmon	Mount Lemmon Survey	·	2.2 km	MPC · JPL
414018	2007 HP_{67}	—	April 23, 2007	Kitt Peak	Spacewatch	·	3.0 km	MPC · JPL
414019	2007 HT_{72}	—	April 22, 2007	Kitt Peak	Spacewatch	·	1.8 km	MPC · JPL
414020	2007 HA_{93}	—	April 19, 2007	Mount Lemmon	Mount Lemmon Survey	·	560 m	MPC · JPL
414021	2007 HH_{97}	—	April 22, 2007	Mount Lemmon	Mount Lemmon Survey	·	2.8 km	MPC · JPL
414022	2007 JW_{44}	—	May 11, 2007	Mount Lemmon	Mount Lemmon Survey	·	4.3 km	MPC · JPL
414023	2007 LA_{4}	—	May 11, 2007	Mount Lemmon	Mount Lemmon Survey	·	2.7 km	MPC · JPL
414024	2007 LB_{11}	—	June 9, 2007	Kitt Peak	Spacewatch	·	2.7 km	MPC · JPL
414025	2007 LO_{15}	—	May 7, 2007	Mount Lemmon	Mount Lemmon Survey	·	2.6 km	MPC · JPL
414026 Bochonko	2007 LX_{29}	Bochonko	June 11, 2007	Mauna Kea	D. D. Balam	·	840 m	MPC · JPL
414027	2007 MF_{13}	—	June 22, 2007	Kitt Peak	Spacewatch	TIR	4.0 km	MPC · JPL
414028	2007 MD_{27}	—	June 17, 2007	Kitt Peak	Spacewatch	·	700 m	MPC · JPL
414029	2007 OK_{1}	—	July 16, 2007	La Sagra	OAM	·	730 m	MPC · JPL
414030	2007 PC_{5}	—	August 5, 2007	Socorro	LINEAR	·	1.2 km	MPC · JPL
414031	2007 PM_{28}	—	August 13, 2007	Socorro	LINEAR	·	630 m	MPC · JPL
414032	2007 PJ_{34}	—	August 8, 2007	Socorro	LINEAR	·	850 m	MPC · JPL
414033	2007 QT_{5}	—	August 18, 2007	Purple Mountain	PMO NEO Survey Program	·	620 m	MPC · JPL
414034	2007 RE_{28}	—	September 4, 2007	Catalina	CSS	·	720 m	MPC · JPL
414035	2007 RX_{36}	—	August 10, 2007	Kitt Peak	Spacewatch	·	710 m	MPC · JPL
414036	2007 RH_{56}	—	September 9, 2007	Kitt Peak	Spacewatch	·	660 m	MPC · JPL
414037	2007 RK_{64}	—	September 10, 2007	Mount Lemmon	Mount Lemmon Survey	·	730 m	MPC · JPL
414038	2007 RX_{86}	—	September 10, 2007	Mount Lemmon	Mount Lemmon Survey	·	860 m	MPC · JPL
414039	2007 RL_{104}	—	September 3, 2007	Catalina	CSS	·	660 m	MPC · JPL
414040	2007 RA_{105}	—	September 11, 2007	Mount Lemmon	Mount Lemmon Survey	·	630 m	MPC · JPL
414041	2007 RY_{118}	—	September 11, 2007	Kitt Peak	Spacewatch	·	650 m	MPC · JPL
414042	2007 RX_{133}	—	September 11, 2007	Mount Lemmon	Mount Lemmon Survey	·	760 m	MPC · JPL
414043	2007 RB_{146}	—	August 21, 2007	Anderson Mesa	LONEOS	·	900 m	MPC · JPL
414044	2007 RK_{159}	—	September 12, 2007	Mount Lemmon	Mount Lemmon Survey	·	880 m	MPC · JPL
414045	2007 RY_{161}	—	September 13, 2007	Mount Lemmon	Mount Lemmon Survey	·	760 m	MPC · JPL
414046	2007 RY_{163}	—	October 9, 2004	Kitt Peak	Spacewatch	·	810 m	MPC · JPL
414047	2007 RW_{197}	—	October 15, 2004	Kitt Peak	Spacewatch	·	600 m	MPC · JPL
414048	2007 RD_{209}	—	January 16, 2005	Kitt Peak	Spacewatch	·	770 m	MPC · JPL
414049	2007 RQ_{210}	—	September 11, 2007	Kitt Peak	Spacewatch	·	600 m	MPC · JPL
414050	2007 RC_{211}	—	September 11, 2007	Kitt Peak	Spacewatch	CYB	2.8 km	MPC · JPL
414051	2007 RC_{213}	—	September 12, 2007	Anderson Mesa	LONEOS	·	810 m	MPC · JPL
414052	2007 RV_{228}	—	September 11, 2007	Kitt Peak	Spacewatch	·	730 m	MPC · JPL
414053	2007 RL_{250}	—	September 9, 2007	Kitt Peak	Spacewatch	V	580 m	MPC · JPL
414054	2007 RZ_{264}	—	September 15, 2007	Mount Lemmon	Mount Lemmon Survey	·	710 m	MPC · JPL
414055	2007 RL_{270}	—	September 15, 2007	Mount Lemmon	Mount Lemmon Survey	·	1.1 km	MPC · JPL
414056	2007 RW_{270}	—	September 15, 2007	Kitt Peak	Spacewatch	V	550 m	MPC · JPL
414057	2007 RK_{284}	—	September 11, 2007	Kitt Peak	Spacewatch	·	640 m	MPC · JPL
414058	2007 RY_{285}	—	September 15, 2007	Mount Lemmon	Mount Lemmon Survey	·	910 m	MPC · JPL
414059	2007 RM_{295}	—	September 14, 2007	Mount Lemmon	Mount Lemmon Survey	·	910 m	MPC · JPL
414060	2007 RC_{302}	—	September 15, 2007	Kitt Peak	Spacewatch	·	880 m	MPC · JPL
414061	2007 RF_{318}	—	September 11, 2007	Catalina	CSS	·	760 m	MPC · JPL
414062	2007 SE_{17}	—	September 30, 2007	Kitt Peak	Spacewatch	·	810 m	MPC · JPL
414063	2007 SG_{17}	—	September 12, 2007	Mount Lemmon	Mount Lemmon Survey	·	730 m	MPC · JPL
414064	2007 SM_{19}	—	September 21, 2007	Purple Mountain	PMO NEO Survey Program	·	710 m	MPC · JPL
414065	2007 SO_{19}	—	September 24, 2007	Kitt Peak	Spacewatch	·	610 m	MPC · JPL
414066	2007 SZ_{20}	—	October 2, 2000	Socorro	LINEAR	·	670 m	MPC · JPL
414067	2007 SB_{22}	—	September 21, 2007	XuYi	PMO NEO Survey Program	·	950 m	MPC · JPL
414068	2007 TX_{20}	—	October 10, 2007	Cordell-Lorenz	Cordell-Lorenz	·	580 m	MPC · JPL
414069	2007 TM_{30}	—	September 8, 2007	Mount Lemmon	Mount Lemmon Survey	·	920 m	MPC · JPL
414070	2007 TS_{33}	—	September 12, 2007	Mount Lemmon	Mount Lemmon Survey	·	730 m	MPC · JPL
414071	2007 TN_{54}	—	September 8, 2007	Mount Lemmon	Mount Lemmon Survey	·	730 m	MPC · JPL
414072	2007 TD_{57}	—	October 4, 2007	Kitt Peak	Spacewatch	·	700 m	MPC · JPL
414073	2007 TJ_{58}	—	October 4, 2007	Kitt Peak	Spacewatch	·	880 m	MPC · JPL
414074	2007 TO_{64}	—	October 7, 2007	Mount Lemmon	Mount Lemmon Survey	·	840 m	MPC · JPL
414075	2007 TU_{69}	—	September 11, 2007	Mount Lemmon	Mount Lemmon Survey	·	580 m	MPC · JPL
414076	2007 TV_{77}	—	October 5, 2007	Kitt Peak	Spacewatch	·	1.0 km	MPC · JPL
414077	2007 TA_{93}	—	March 23, 2006	Kitt Peak	Spacewatch	·	800 m	MPC · JPL
414078	2007 TH_{103}	—	October 8, 2007	Mount Lemmon	Mount Lemmon Survey	·	850 m	MPC · JPL
414079	2007 TU_{107}	—	October 4, 2007	Catalina	CSS	·	980 m	MPC · JPL
414080	2007 TL_{116}	—	August 24, 2007	Kitt Peak	Spacewatch	·	830 m	MPC · JPL
414081	2007 TV_{122}	—	October 6, 2007	Kitt Peak	Spacewatch	·	800 m	MPC · JPL
414082	2007 TN_{123}	—	September 15, 2007	Mount Lemmon	Mount Lemmon Survey	·	710 m	MPC · JPL
414083	2007 TZ_{126}	—	October 6, 2007	Kitt Peak	Spacewatch	·	540 m	MPC · JPL
414084	2007 TY_{153}	—	October 9, 2007	Socorro	LINEAR	·	900 m	MPC · JPL
414085	2007 TG_{156}	—	October 12, 2007	Mount Lemmon	Mount Lemmon Survey	·	1.1 km	MPC · JPL
414086	2007 TV_{165}	—	October 4, 2007	Kitt Peak	Spacewatch	·	860 m	MPC · JPL
414087	2007 TY_{166}	—	October 12, 2007	Socorro	LINEAR	·	1.1 km	MPC · JPL
414088	2007 TQ_{177}	—	September 9, 2007	Mount Lemmon	Mount Lemmon Survey	·	790 m	MPC · JPL
414089	2007 TL_{181}	—	October 8, 2007	Anderson Mesa	LONEOS	·	1.1 km	MPC · JPL
414090	2007 TS_{192}	—	October 5, 2007	Kitt Peak	Spacewatch	·	950 m	MPC · JPL
414091	2007 TA_{199}	—	January 16, 2005	Kitt Peak	Spacewatch	·	650 m	MPC · JPL
414092	2007 TG_{212}	—	October 7, 2007	Kitt Peak	Spacewatch	·	1.0 km	MPC · JPL
414093	2007 TD_{213}	—	October 7, 2007	Kitt Peak	Spacewatch	·	720 m	MPC · JPL
414094	2007 TD_{216}	—	October 7, 2007	Kitt Peak	Spacewatch	·	640 m	MPC · JPL
414095	2007 TF_{222}	—	September 25, 2007	Mount Lemmon	Mount Lemmon Survey	·	800 m	MPC · JPL
414096	2007 TD_{229}	—	October 8, 2007	Kitt Peak	Spacewatch	·	680 m	MPC · JPL
414097	2007 TH_{231}	—	October 8, 2007	Mount Lemmon	Mount Lemmon Survey	·	640 m	MPC · JPL
414098	2007 TT_{242}	—	October 8, 2007	Catalina	CSS	·	830 m	MPC · JPL
414099	2007 TR_{243}	—	October 8, 2007	Catalina	CSS	·	850 m	MPC · JPL
414100	2007 TG_{268}	—	September 14, 2007	Mount Lemmon	Mount Lemmon Survey	·	1.0 km	MPC · JPL

== 414101–414200 ==
back to top

Designation			Discovery			Properties		Ref
Permanent	Provisional	Named after	Date	Site	Discoverer(s)	Category	Diam.	Ref
414101	2007 TF_{281}	—	September 19, 2007	Kitt Peak	Spacewatch	·	760 m	MPC · JPL
414102	2007 TJ_{298}	—	September 15, 2007	Mount Lemmon	Mount Lemmon Survey	·	770 m	MPC · JPL
414103	2007 TQ_{318}	—	October 12, 2007	Kitt Peak	Spacewatch	·	1.1 km	MPC · JPL
414104	2007 TX_{320}	—	October 14, 2007	Mount Lemmon	Mount Lemmon Survey	·	560 m	MPC · JPL
414105	2007 TT_{332}	—	February 9, 2005	Mount Lemmon	Mount Lemmon Survey	·	620 m	MPC · JPL
414106	2007 TK_{385}	—	October 15, 2007	Catalina	CSS	·	680 m	MPC · JPL
414107	2007 TS_{386}	—	October 15, 2007	Kitt Peak	Spacewatch	·	1.0 km	MPC · JPL
414108	2007 TM_{401}	—	October 15, 2007	Catalina	CSS	·	750 m	MPC · JPL
414109	2007 TZ_{448}	—	October 9, 2007	Mount Lemmon	Mount Lemmon Survey	NYS	1.0 km	MPC · JPL
414110	2007 UM_{18}	—	October 17, 2007	Anderson Mesa	LONEOS	·	1.1 km	MPC · JPL
414111	2007 UR_{21}	—	September 10, 2007	Mount Lemmon	Mount Lemmon Survey	·	780 m	MPC · JPL
414112	2007 UD_{23}	—	October 8, 2007	Mount Lemmon	Mount Lemmon Survey	·	1.2 km	MPC · JPL
414113	2007 UQ_{29}	—	September 25, 2007	Mount Lemmon	Mount Lemmon Survey	·	670 m	MPC · JPL
414114	2007 UM_{33}	—	October 16, 2007	Mount Lemmon	Mount Lemmon Survey	·	930 m	MPC · JPL
414115	2007 UW_{34}	—	October 12, 2007	Socorro	LINEAR	V	720 m	MPC · JPL
414116	2007 UG_{35}	—	October 19, 2007	Catalina	CSS	·	740 m	MPC · JPL
414117	2007 UE_{49}	—	October 24, 2007	Mount Lemmon	Mount Lemmon Survey	·	650 m	MPC · JPL
414118	2007 UZ_{49}	—	October 24, 2007	Mount Lemmon	Mount Lemmon Survey	·	880 m	MPC · JPL
414119	2007 UN_{63}	—	October 30, 2007	Mount Lemmon	Mount Lemmon Survey	·	610 m	MPC · JPL
414120	2007 UC_{68}	—	October 30, 2007	Catalina	CSS	·	960 m	MPC · JPL
414121	2007 UF_{68}	—	March 16, 2005	Mount Lemmon	Mount Lemmon Survey	MAS	700 m	MPC · JPL
414122	2007 UN_{68}	—	October 8, 2007	Mount Lemmon	Mount Lemmon Survey	·	800 m	MPC · JPL
414123	2007 UQ_{87}	—	October 30, 2007	Kitt Peak	Spacewatch	·	710 m	MPC · JPL
414124	2007 UQ_{131}	—	October 16, 2007	Kitt Peak	Spacewatch	·	840 m	MPC · JPL
414125	2007 UP_{138}	—	October 20, 2007	Socorro	LINEAR	·	830 m	MPC · JPL
414126	2007 UR_{139}	—	October 24, 2007	Mount Lemmon	Mount Lemmon Survey	·	1.2 km	MPC · JPL
414127	2007 VR_{9}	—	October 10, 2007	Mount Lemmon	Mount Lemmon Survey	·	800 m	MPC · JPL
414128	2007 VS_{43}	—	November 1, 2007	Kitt Peak	Spacewatch	·	990 m	MPC · JPL
414129	2007 VL_{50}	—	October 9, 2007	Kitt Peak	Spacewatch	·	1 km	MPC · JPL
414130	2007 VJ_{51}	—	November 1, 2007	Kitt Peak	Spacewatch	·	830 m	MPC · JPL
414131	2007 VA_{57}	—	October 20, 2007	Mount Lemmon	Mount Lemmon Survey	·	800 m	MPC · JPL
414132	2007 VJ_{62}	—	November 1, 2007	Kitt Peak	Spacewatch	·	1.1 km	MPC · JPL
414133	2007 VG_{65}	—	November 1, 2007	Kitt Peak	Spacewatch	·	1.0 km	MPC · JPL
414134	2007 VQ_{84}	—	November 6, 2007	7300	W. K. Y. Yeung	PHO	1.1 km	MPC · JPL
414135	2007 VU_{102}	—	November 3, 2007	Kitt Peak	Spacewatch	·	730 m	MPC · JPL
414136	2007 VB_{145}	—	November 4, 2007	Kitt Peak	Spacewatch	·	860 m	MPC · JPL
414137	2007 VC_{166}	—	November 5, 2007	Kitt Peak	Spacewatch	·	820 m	MPC · JPL
414138	2007 VB_{217}	—	November 9, 2007	Kitt Peak	Spacewatch	·	1.1 km	MPC · JPL
414139	2007 VY_{223}	—	October 13, 2007	Mount Lemmon	Mount Lemmon Survey	·	880 m	MPC · JPL
414140	2007 VL_{239}	—	November 13, 2007	Kitt Peak	Spacewatch	·	770 m	MPC · JPL
414141	2007 VQ_{247}	—	November 13, 2007	Mount Lemmon	Mount Lemmon Survey	·	780 m	MPC · JPL
414142	2007 VG_{256}	—	November 13, 2007	Mount Lemmon	Mount Lemmon Survey	·	770 m	MPC · JPL
414143	2007 VR_{273}	—	March 8, 2005	Mount Lemmon	Mount Lemmon Survey	·	600 m	MPC · JPL
414144	2007 VC_{285}	—	November 5, 2007	Kitt Peak	Spacewatch	V	680 m	MPC · JPL
414145	2007 VB_{292}	—	September 15, 2007	Mount Lemmon	Mount Lemmon Survey	MAS	590 m	MPC · JPL
414146	2007 VU_{293}	—	November 5, 2007	Kitt Peak	Spacewatch	NYS	960 m	MPC · JPL
414147	2007 VH_{310}	—	November 7, 2007	Mount Lemmon	Mount Lemmon Survey	·	1.4 km	MPC · JPL
414148	2007 VE_{313}	—	November 6, 2007	Kitt Peak	Spacewatch	NYS	770 m	MPC · JPL
414149	2007 VJ_{335}	—	November 8, 2007	Kitt Peak	Spacewatch	·	1.2 km	MPC · JPL
414150	2007 WK_{5}	—	September 11, 2007	Kitt Peak	Spacewatch	·	910 m	MPC · JPL
414151	2007 WG_{11}	—	October 14, 2007	Kitt Peak	Spacewatch	ERI	1.6 km	MPC · JPL
414152	2007 WM_{26}	—	October 10, 2007	Mount Lemmon	Mount Lemmon Survey	V	690 m	MPC · JPL
414153	2007 WK_{28}	—	October 11, 2007	Kitt Peak	Spacewatch	·	880 m	MPC · JPL
414154	2007 WC_{40}	—	November 17, 2007	Mount Lemmon	Mount Lemmon Survey	V	650 m	MPC · JPL
414155	2007 WO_{43}	—	November 19, 2007	Kitt Peak	Spacewatch	·	840 m	MPC · JPL
414156	2007 XW_{5}	—	November 16, 2007	Mount Lemmon	Mount Lemmon Survey	·	1.2 km	MPC · JPL
414157	2007 XU_{18}	—	December 11, 2007	Skylive	Tozzi, F.	·	1.6 km	MPC · JPL
414158	2007 XC_{59}	—	December 14, 2007	Mount Lemmon	Mount Lemmon Survey	·	840 m	MPC · JPL
414159	2007 YC_{3}	—	November 2, 2007	Kitt Peak	Spacewatch	·	1.0 km	MPC · JPL
414160	2007 YJ_{12}	—	December 17, 2007	Mount Lemmon	Mount Lemmon Survey	·	980 m	MPC · JPL
414161	2007 YO_{45}	—	December 30, 2007	Mount Lemmon	Mount Lemmon Survey	MAS	860 m	MPC · JPL
414162	2007 YD_{70}	—	December 31, 2007	Mount Lemmon	Mount Lemmon Survey	PHO	1.2 km	MPC · JPL
414163	2008 AF_{13}	—	January 10, 2008	Mount Lemmon	Mount Lemmon Survey	·	980 m	MPC · JPL
414164	2008 AW_{32}	—	January 11, 2008	Kitt Peak	Spacewatch	NYS	1.1 km	MPC · JPL
414165	2008 AS_{61}	—	January 11, 2008	Kitt Peak	Spacewatch	NYS	980 m	MPC · JPL
414166	2008 AU_{67}	—	January 11, 2008	Kitt Peak	Spacewatch	·	2.5 km	MPC · JPL
414167	2008 AX_{82}	—	November 21, 2007	Mount Lemmon	Mount Lemmon Survey	·	1.1 km	MPC · JPL
414168	2008 AB_{89}	—	November 11, 2007	Mount Lemmon	Mount Lemmon Survey	MAS	830 m	MPC · JPL
414169	2008 AA_{91}	—	January 13, 2008	Kitt Peak	Spacewatch	·	1.1 km	MPC · JPL
414170	2008 AS_{97}	—	January 14, 2008	Kitt Peak	Spacewatch	NYS	830 m	MPC · JPL
414171	2008 AG_{99}	—	January 14, 2008	Kitt Peak	Spacewatch	·	940 m	MPC · JPL
414172	2008 AR_{102}	—	January 13, 2008	Kitt Peak	Spacewatch	·	1.0 km	MPC · JPL
414173	2008 AU_{128}	—	January 1, 2008	Kitt Peak	Spacewatch	MAS	550 m	MPC · JPL
414174	2008 AK_{135}	—	January 11, 2008	Catalina	CSS	·	1.5 km	MPC · JPL
414175	2008 BE_{14}	—	January 19, 2008	Kitt Peak	Spacewatch	·	1.0 km	MPC · JPL
414176	2008 BK_{32}	—	January 30, 2008	Mount Lemmon	Mount Lemmon Survey	·	1.3 km	MPC · JPL
414177	2008 BE_{38}	—	January 31, 2008	Mount Lemmon	Mount Lemmon Survey	·	1.2 km	MPC · JPL
414178	2008 CW	—	December 31, 2007	Mount Lemmon	Mount Lemmon Survey	MAS	530 m	MPC · JPL
414179	2008 CA_{4}	—	February 2, 2008	Mount Lemmon	Mount Lemmon Survey	NYS	1.1 km	MPC · JPL
414180	2008 CO_{6}	—	February 1, 2008	Kitt Peak	Spacewatch	MAS	700 m	MPC · JPL
414181	2008 CJ_{33}	—	February 2, 2008	Kitt Peak	Spacewatch	MAS	630 m	MPC · JPL
414182	2008 CF_{39}	—	February 2, 2008	Mount Lemmon	Mount Lemmon Survey	·	1.1 km	MPC · JPL
414183	2008 CS_{65}	—	January 10, 2008	Kitt Peak	Spacewatch	·	1.0 km	MPC · JPL
414184	2008 CR_{81}	—	June 29, 2005	Kitt Peak	Spacewatch	·	1.5 km	MPC · JPL
414185	2008 CE_{109}	—	February 9, 2008	Kitt Peak	Spacewatch	·	1.5 km	MPC · JPL
414186	2008 CN_{109}	—	February 9, 2008	Kitt Peak	Spacewatch	·	1.4 km	MPC · JPL
414187	2008 CL_{137}	—	February 8, 2008	Kitt Peak	Spacewatch	·	2.0 km	MPC · JPL
414188	2008 CZ_{141}	—	February 8, 2008	Kitt Peak	Spacewatch	·	1.8 km	MPC · JPL
414189	2008 CG_{159}	—	February 9, 2008	Kitt Peak	Spacewatch	·	1.1 km	MPC · JPL
414190	2008 CC_{171}	—	February 12, 2008	Mount Lemmon	Mount Lemmon Survey	·	1.3 km	MPC · JPL
414191	2008 CS_{174}	—	February 13, 2008	Mount Lemmon	Mount Lemmon Survey	·	1.6 km	MPC · JPL
414192	2008 CU_{192}	—	February 7, 2008	Mount Lemmon	Mount Lemmon Survey	·	990 m	MPC · JPL
414193	2008 CZ_{197}	—	February 10, 2008	Mount Lemmon	Mount Lemmon Survey	·	1.6 km	MPC · JPL
414194	2008 CB_{200}	—	February 7, 2008	Mount Lemmon	Mount Lemmon Survey	·	1.7 km	MPC · JPL
414195	2008 CC_{210}	—	February 1, 2008	Kitt Peak	Spacewatch	NYS	1.1 km	MPC · JPL
414196	2008 CK_{210}	—	February 2, 2008	Kitt Peak	Spacewatch	ADE	1.9 km	MPC · JPL
414197	2008 CD_{215}	—	February 13, 2008	Mount Lemmon	Mount Lemmon Survey	·	1.4 km	MPC · JPL
414198	2008 DE_{6}	—	December 18, 2007	Mount Lemmon	Mount Lemmon Survey	·	900 m	MPC · JPL
414199	2008 DT_{15}	—	February 27, 2008	Anderson Mesa	LONEOS	T_{j} (2.98) · 3:2	6.2 km	MPC · JPL
414200	2008 DW_{15}	—	February 18, 2008	Mount Lemmon	Mount Lemmon Survey	·	1.3 km	MPC · JPL

== 414201–414300 ==
back to top

Designation			Discovery			Properties		Ref
Permanent	Provisional	Named after	Date	Site	Discoverer(s)	Category	Diam.	Ref
414201	2008 DU_{36}	—	February 27, 2008	Mount Lemmon	Mount Lemmon Survey	·	1.6 km	MPC · JPL
414202	2008 DU_{43}	—	February 28, 2008	Kitt Peak	Spacewatch	MAR	920 m	MPC · JPL
414203	2008 DE_{66}	—	January 18, 2008	Mount Lemmon	Mount Lemmon Survey	EUN	1.4 km	MPC · JPL
414204	2008 DF_{66}	—	February 28, 2008	Kitt Peak	Spacewatch	H	500 m	MPC · JPL
414205	2008 DB_{67}	—	February 29, 2008	Kitt Peak	Spacewatch	·	2.2 km	MPC · JPL
414206	2008 DX_{77}	—	February 9, 2008	Kitt Peak	Spacewatch	·	1.3 km	MPC · JPL
414207	2008 DQ_{78}	—	February 28, 2008	Mount Lemmon	Mount Lemmon Survey	·	1.3 km	MPC · JPL
414208	2008 ET_{6}	—	March 2, 2008	Marly	P. Kocher	·	1.5 km	MPC · JPL
414209	2008 EY_{15}	—	March 1, 2008	Kitt Peak	Spacewatch	·	1.6 km	MPC · JPL
414210	2008 EN_{16}	—	March 1, 2008	Kitt Peak	Spacewatch	HNS	1.1 km	MPC · JPL
414211	2008 EY_{19}	—	February 13, 2008	Mount Lemmon	Mount Lemmon Survey	·	2.1 km	MPC · JPL
414212	2008 EU_{22}	—	March 3, 2008	Catalina	CSS	·	1.7 km	MPC · JPL
414213	2008 EN_{42}	—	March 4, 2008	Mount Lemmon	Mount Lemmon Survey	·	2.0 km	MPC · JPL
414214	2008 ES_{44}	—	March 5, 2008	Kitt Peak	Spacewatch	·	1.5 km	MPC · JPL
414215	2008 EF_{46}	—	March 5, 2008	Kitt Peak	Spacewatch	·	1.8 km	MPC · JPL
414216	2008 EE_{70}	—	February 8, 2008	Catalina	CSS	·	1.5 km	MPC · JPL
414217	2008 EN_{74}	—	March 7, 2008	Kitt Peak	Spacewatch	MIS	2.6 km	MPC · JPL
414218	2008 EZ_{82}	—	February 2, 2008	Mount Lemmon	Mount Lemmon Survey	H	620 m	MPC · JPL
414219	2008 EE_{126}	—	March 10, 2008	Kitt Peak	Spacewatch	·	1.6 km	MPC · JPL
414220	2008 EL_{152}	—	March 10, 2008	Mount Lemmon	Mount Lemmon Survey	·	1.4 km	MPC · JPL
414221	2008 EP_{165}	—	March 2, 2008	Mount Lemmon	Mount Lemmon Survey	·	1.8 km	MPC · JPL
414222	2008 FZ_{6}	—	March 13, 2008	Catalina	CSS	·	1.7 km	MPC · JPL
414223	2008 FV_{7}	—	February 10, 2008	Kitt Peak	Spacewatch	·	1.7 km	MPC · JPL
414224	2008 FA_{18}	—	February 27, 2008	Mount Lemmon	Mount Lemmon Survey	H	490 m	MPC · JPL
414225	2008 FS_{20}	—	March 10, 2008	Mount Lemmon	Mount Lemmon Survey	·	1.1 km	MPC · JPL
414226	2008 FX_{28}	—	March 28, 2008	Kitt Peak	Spacewatch	NYS	1.1 km	MPC · JPL
414227	2008 FG_{41}	—	March 28, 2008	Kitt Peak	Spacewatch	·	1.8 km	MPC · JPL
414228	2008 FB_{51}	—	February 9, 2008	Mount Lemmon	Mount Lemmon Survey	·	1.8 km	MPC · JPL
414229	2008 FV_{54}	—	March 5, 2008	Kitt Peak	Spacewatch	·	1.8 km	MPC · JPL
414230	2008 FM_{69}	—	March 28, 2008	Mount Lemmon	Mount Lemmon Survey	·	1.4 km	MPC · JPL
414231	2008 FF_{70}	—	March 28, 2008	Kitt Peak	Spacewatch	·	2.0 km	MPC · JPL
414232	2008 FL_{70}	—	March 28, 2008	Kitt Peak	Spacewatch	·	1.6 km	MPC · JPL
414233	2008 FS_{72}	—	March 30, 2008	Kitt Peak	Spacewatch	·	1.6 km	MPC · JPL
414234	2008 FA_{74}	—	March 31, 2008	Kitt Peak	Spacewatch	MAR	890 m	MPC · JPL
414235	2008 FO_{76}	—	March 27, 2008	Kitt Peak	Spacewatch	·	1.3 km	MPC · JPL
414236	2008 FW_{79}	—	March 10, 2008	Kitt Peak	Spacewatch	·	1.5 km	MPC · JPL
414237	2008 FX_{105}	—	March 31, 2008	Kitt Peak	Spacewatch	(5)	1.5 km	MPC · JPL
414238	2008 FC_{106}	—	March 31, 2008	Kitt Peak	Spacewatch	·	2.0 km	MPC · JPL
414239	2008 FH_{112}	—	March 30, 2008	Kitt Peak	Spacewatch	·	2.5 km	MPC · JPL
414240	2008 FZ_{128}	—	March 29, 2008	Kitt Peak	Spacewatch	·	2.1 km	MPC · JPL
414241	2008 FY_{131}	—	November 15, 2006	Mount Lemmon	Mount Lemmon Survey	MAS	840 m	MPC · JPL
414242	2008 FS_{135}	—	March 31, 2008	Mount Lemmon	Mount Lemmon Survey	MAR	970 m	MPC · JPL
414243	2008 GW_{17}	—	March 27, 2008	Kitt Peak	Spacewatch	·	1.4 km	MPC · JPL
414244	2008 GO_{21}	—	March 5, 2008	Catalina	CSS	·	3.0 km	MPC · JPL
414245	2008 GA_{24}	—	March 10, 2008	Mount Lemmon	Mount Lemmon Survey	·	1.3 km	MPC · JPL
414246	2008 GN_{26}	—	April 1, 2008	Kitt Peak	Spacewatch	·	1.7 km	MPC · JPL
414247	2008 GS_{30}	—	April 3, 2008	Mount Lemmon	Mount Lemmon Survey	·	1.4 km	MPC · JPL
414248	2008 GT_{31}	—	March 26, 2008	Kitt Peak	Spacewatch	ADE	2.2 km	MPC · JPL
414249	2008 GC_{32}	—	April 3, 2008	Kitt Peak	Spacewatch	L5	9.5 km	MPC · JPL
414250	2008 GH_{36}	—	April 3, 2008	Kitt Peak	Spacewatch	MAR	1.4 km	MPC · JPL
414251	2008 GY_{36}	—	April 3, 2008	Kitt Peak	Spacewatch	JUN	1.4 km	MPC · JPL
414252	2008 GN_{37}	—	April 3, 2008	Kitt Peak	Spacewatch	·	2.3 km	MPC · JPL
414253	2008 GY_{41}	—	March 29, 2008	Kitt Peak	Spacewatch	AGN	1.3 km	MPC · JPL
414254	2008 GG_{75}	—	April 3, 2008	Kitt Peak	Spacewatch	·	1.5 km	MPC · JPL
414255	2008 GD_{77}	—	April 7, 2008	Kitt Peak	Spacewatch	·	2.0 km	MPC · JPL
414256	2008 GJ_{77}	—	April 7, 2008	Kitt Peak	Spacewatch	L5	9.2 km	MPC · JPL
414257	2008 GZ_{77}	—	April 7, 2008	Kitt Peak	Spacewatch	·	1.9 km	MPC · JPL
414258	2008 GD_{78}	—	April 3, 2008	Kitt Peak	Spacewatch	·	2.3 km	MPC · JPL
414259	2008 GH_{87}	—	April 10, 2008	Kitt Peak	Spacewatch	·	1.0 km	MPC · JPL
414260	2008 GQ_{88}	—	March 31, 2008	Kitt Peak	Spacewatch	·	1.2 km	MPC · JPL
414261	2008 GV_{88}	—	April 6, 2008	Kitt Peak	Spacewatch	·	1.7 km	MPC · JPL
414262	2008 GN_{92}	—	April 6, 2008	Mount Lemmon	Mount Lemmon Survey	H	400 m	MPC · JPL
414263	2008 GP_{105}	—	March 31, 2008	Mount Lemmon	Mount Lemmon Survey	·	1.4 km	MPC · JPL
414264	2008 GN_{111}	—	March 29, 2008	Kitt Peak	Spacewatch	H	520 m	MPC · JPL
414265	2008 GC_{113}	—	April 7, 2008	Catalina	CSS	EUN	1.6 km	MPC · JPL
414266	2008 GW_{121}	—	April 13, 2008	Kitt Peak	Spacewatch	·	1.3 km	MPC · JPL
414267	2008 GW_{123}	—	March 2, 2008	Kitt Peak	Spacewatch	·	1.7 km	MPC · JPL
414268	2008 HP	—	March 10, 2008	Kitt Peak	Spacewatch	·	1.4 km	MPC · JPL
414269	2008 HW_{11}	—	April 4, 2008	Kitt Peak	Spacewatch	·	1.8 km	MPC · JPL
414270	2008 HG_{21}	—	April 26, 2008	Kitt Peak	Spacewatch	·	2.0 km	MPC · JPL
414271	2008 HR_{22}	—	April 27, 2008	Kitt Peak	Spacewatch	·	1.6 km	MPC · JPL
414272	2008 HZ_{32}	—	March 29, 2008	Kitt Peak	Spacewatch	·	950 m	MPC · JPL
414273	2008 JC_{4}	—	May 1, 2008	Catalina	CSS	·	5.0 km	MPC · JPL
414274	2008 JR_{8}	—	May 5, 2008	Bergisch Gladbach	Bergisch Gladbach	·	1.9 km	MPC · JPL
414275	2008 JO_{21}	—	May 5, 2008	Kitt Peak	Spacewatch	L5	9.4 km	MPC · JPL
414276	2008 JF_{32}	—	May 1, 2008	Siding Spring	SSS	·	3.0 km	MPC · JPL
414277	2008 JU_{34}	—	May 15, 2008	Kitt Peak	Spacewatch	·	2.1 km	MPC · JPL
414278	2008 JW_{35}	—	May 3, 2008	Kitt Peak	Spacewatch	·	2.0 km	MPC · JPL
414279	2008 KB_{26}	—	May 29, 2008	Mount Lemmon	Mount Lemmon Survey	H · slow	690 m	MPC · JPL
414280	2008 KD_{36}	—	April 4, 2008	Kitt Peak	Spacewatch	·	1.6 km	MPC · JPL
414281	2008 KA_{43}	—	May 28, 2008	Kitt Peak	Spacewatch	·	2.0 km	MPC · JPL
414282	2008 MN_{3}	—	June 28, 2008	Siding Spring	SSS	T_{j} (2.99)	6.0 km	MPC · JPL
414283 Lécureuil	2008 MW_{4}	Lécureuil	June 30, 2008	Vicques	M. Ory	·	2.1 km	MPC · JPL
414284	2008 ML_{5}	—	June 29, 2008	Siding Spring	SSS	·	4.5 km	MPC · JPL
414285	2008 OY	—	July 26, 2008	La Sagra	OAM	H	760 m	MPC · JPL
414286	2008 OC_{6}	—	July 29, 2008	Mount Lemmon	Mount Lemmon Survey	ATE · PHA	370 m	MPC · JPL
414287	2008 OB_{9}	—	July 29, 2008	Mount Lemmon	Mount Lemmon Survey	T_{j} (2.62) · APO +1km · PHA	2.0 km	MPC · JPL
414288	2008 OD_{16}	—	July 28, 2008	La Sagra	OAM	·	2.3 km	MPC · JPL
414289	2008 PU_{7}	—	August 5, 2008	La Sagra	OAM	EOS	2.3 km	MPC · JPL
414290	2008 PY_{14}	—	August 10, 2008	La Sagra	OAM	·	2.9 km	MPC · JPL
414291	2008 PF_{22}	—	August 10, 2008	Črni Vrh	Skvarč, J.	EUP	4.6 km	MPC · JPL
414292	2008 QF_{1}	—	July 30, 2008	Kitt Peak	Spacewatch	THB	3.1 km	MPC · JPL
414293	2008 QE_{6}	—	August 25, 2008	Dauban	Kugel, F.	EOS	2.2 km	MPC · JPL
414294	2008 QC_{12}	—	August 25, 2008	La Sagra	OAM	·	2.2 km	MPC · JPL
414295	2008 QJ_{21}	—	July 29, 2008	Mount Lemmon	Mount Lemmon Survey	·	4.1 km	MPC · JPL
414296	2008 QJ_{44}	—	August 23, 2008	Siding Spring	SSS	·	4.0 km	MPC · JPL
414297	2008 QY_{45}	—	August 26, 2008	Črni Vrh	Zakrajšek, J.	·	3.1 km	MPC · JPL
414298	2008 RT_{1}	—	September 2, 2008	Kitt Peak	Spacewatch	·	4.7 km	MPC · JPL
414299	2008 RV_{11}	—	September 3, 2008	Kitt Peak	Spacewatch	·	2.7 km	MPC · JPL
414300	2008 RQ_{13}	—	August 24, 2008	Kitt Peak	Spacewatch	·	3.2 km	MPC · JPL

== 414301–414400 ==
back to top

Designation			Discovery			Properties		Ref
Permanent	Provisional	Named after	Date	Site	Discoverer(s)	Category	Diam.	Ref
414301	2008 RS_{18}	—	August 24, 2008	Kitt Peak	Spacewatch	EOS	1.7 km	MPC · JPL
414302	2008 RC_{26}	—	September 7, 2008	Dauban	Kugel, F.	·	2.9 km	MPC · JPL
414303	2008 RX_{29}	—	September 2, 2008	Kitt Peak	Spacewatch	·	2.7 km	MPC · JPL
414304	2008 RA_{33}	—	September 2, 2008	Kitt Peak	Spacewatch	·	2.7 km	MPC · JPL
414305	2008 RC_{43}	—	September 2, 2008	Kitt Peak	Spacewatch	(1118)	4.8 km	MPC · JPL
414306	2008 RR_{45}	—	September 2, 2008	Kitt Peak	Spacewatch	·	3.9 km	MPC · JPL
414307	2008 RQ_{53}	—	September 3, 2008	Kitt Peak	Spacewatch	·	2.6 km	MPC · JPL
414308	2008 RJ_{76}	—	August 6, 2008	Siding Spring	SSS	·	2.6 km	MPC · JPL
414309	2008 RF_{79}	—	September 8, 2008	Taunus	E. Schwab, R. Kling	·	3.4 km	MPC · JPL
414310	2008 RM_{85}	—	September 5, 2008	Kitt Peak	Spacewatch	LIX	3.6 km	MPC · JPL
414311	2008 RV_{89}	—	September 5, 2008	Kitt Peak	Spacewatch	·	3.0 km	MPC · JPL
414312	2008 RU_{99}	—	September 2, 2008	Kitt Peak	Spacewatch	·	3.6 km	MPC · JPL
414313	2008 RQ_{109}	—	September 2, 2008	Kitt Peak	Spacewatch	THM	2.4 km	MPC · JPL
414314	2008 RC_{114}	—	September 6, 2008	Mount Lemmon	Mount Lemmon Survey	·	2.9 km	MPC · JPL
414315	2008 RP_{115}	—	September 7, 2008	Mount Lemmon	Mount Lemmon Survey	·	2.6 km	MPC · JPL
414316	2008 RX_{117}	—	September 9, 2008	Kitt Peak	Spacewatch	EOS	1.9 km	MPC · JPL
414317	2008 RJ_{124}	—	September 6, 2008	Mount Lemmon	Mount Lemmon Survey	·	2.0 km	MPC · JPL
414318	2008 RQ_{127}	—	September 6, 2008	Kitt Peak	Spacewatch	EOS	1.5 km	MPC · JPL
414319	2008 RF_{128}	—	June 9, 2007	Kitt Peak	Spacewatch	·	3.0 km	MPC · JPL
414320	2008 RO_{140}	—	September 9, 2008	Mount Lemmon	Mount Lemmon Survey	·	2.9 km	MPC · JPL
414321	2008 RA_{141}	—	September 3, 2008	La Sagra	OAM	EUP	4.2 km	MPC · JPL
414322	2008 RP_{141}	—	September 6, 2008	Mount Lemmon	Mount Lemmon Survey	THM	1.8 km	MPC · JPL
414323	2008 RD_{146}	—	September 5, 2008	Kitt Peak	Spacewatch	(69559)	2.6 km	MPC · JPL
414324	2008 SS_{8}	—	August 21, 2008	Kitt Peak	Spacewatch	·	2.9 km	MPC · JPL
414325	2008 SG_{25}	—	September 3, 2008	Kitt Peak	Spacewatch	EUP	3.9 km	MPC · JPL
414326	2008 SU_{28}	—	September 19, 2008	Kitt Peak	Spacewatch	·	3.2 km	MPC · JPL
414327	2008 SC_{64}	—	September 21, 2008	Mount Lemmon	Mount Lemmon Survey	·	4.1 km	MPC · JPL
414328	2008 SH_{77}	—	September 23, 2008	Mount Lemmon	Mount Lemmon Survey	·	3.5 km	MPC · JPL
414329	2008 SD_{90}	—	September 21, 2008	Kitt Peak	Spacewatch	·	3.4 km	MPC · JPL
414330	2008 SR_{97}	—	September 21, 2008	Kitt Peak	Spacewatch	·	2.5 km	MPC · JPL
414331	2008 SY_{113}	—	September 22, 2008	Kitt Peak	Spacewatch	·	2.9 km	MPC · JPL
414332	2008 SY_{133}	—	October 29, 2003	Kitt Peak	Spacewatch	·	2.6 km	MPC · JPL
414333	2008 SN_{151}	—	September 29, 2008	Dauban	Kugel, F.	·	5.0 km	MPC · JPL
414334	2008 SC_{170}	—	September 5, 2008	Kitt Peak	Spacewatch	VER	2.3 km	MPC · JPL
414335	2008 SB_{192}	—	September 25, 2008	Kitt Peak	Spacewatch	·	2.8 km	MPC · JPL
414336	2008 SX_{214}	—	September 6, 2008	Kitt Peak	Spacewatch	·	2.2 km	MPC · JPL
414337	2008 SC_{218}	—	September 29, 2008	La Sagra	OAM	CYB	4.6 km	MPC · JPL
414338	2008 SD_{219}	—	September 20, 2008	Catalina	CSS	HYG	3.3 km	MPC · JPL
414339	2008 SK_{223}	—	September 25, 2008	Mount Lemmon	Mount Lemmon Survey	VER	2.9 km	MPC · JPL
414340	2008 SH_{245}	—	September 29, 2008	Mount Lemmon	Mount Lemmon Survey	·	3.5 km	MPC · JPL
414341	2008 SQ_{252}	—	September 20, 2008	Kitt Peak	Spacewatch	THM	2.2 km	MPC · JPL
414342	2008 SB_{253}	—	September 21, 2008	Kitt Peak	Spacewatch	·	2.7 km	MPC · JPL
414343	2008 SK_{278}	—	September 20, 2008	Kitt Peak	Spacewatch	(1298)	3.0 km	MPC · JPL
414344	2008 SX_{282}	—	September 28, 2008	Catalina	CSS	·	3.1 km	MPC · JPL
414345	2008 SW_{286}	—	September 23, 2008	Catalina	CSS	·	7.8 km	MPC · JPL
414346	2008 SV_{287}	—	September 23, 2008	Kitt Peak	Spacewatch	·	3.7 km	MPC · JPL
414347	2008 SD_{303}	—	September 24, 2008	Mount Lemmon	Mount Lemmon Survey	·	3.0 km	MPC · JPL
414348	2008 SK_{308}	—	September 30, 2008	Catalina	CSS	·	2.9 km	MPC · JPL
414349	2008 TQ_{8}	—	October 5, 2008	La Sagra	OAM	VER	3.2 km	MPC · JPL
414350	2008 TJ_{18}	—	October 1, 2008	Mount Lemmon	Mount Lemmon Survey	·	4.9 km	MPC · JPL
414351	2008 TD_{31}	—	October 1, 2008	Kitt Peak	Spacewatch	·	2.9 km	MPC · JPL
414352	2008 TB_{32}	—	September 24, 2008	Kitt Peak	Spacewatch	·	2.6 km	MPC · JPL
414353	2008 TO_{44}	—	October 1, 2008	Mount Lemmon	Mount Lemmon Survey	THM	2.5 km	MPC · JPL
414354	2008 TP_{50}	—	September 7, 2008	Mount Lemmon	Mount Lemmon Survey	·	2.9 km	MPC · JPL
414355	2008 TO_{56}	—	September 24, 2008	Kitt Peak	Spacewatch	VER	2.3 km	MPC · JPL
414356	2008 TB_{75}	—	October 2, 2008	Kitt Peak	Spacewatch	CYB	5.4 km	MPC · JPL
414357	2008 TL_{79}	—	October 2, 2008	Mount Lemmon	Mount Lemmon Survey	·	3.5 km	MPC · JPL
414358	2008 TL_{95}	—	October 6, 2008	Kitt Peak	Spacewatch	·	3.2 km	MPC · JPL
414359	2008 TW_{106}	—	October 6, 2008	Mount Lemmon	Mount Lemmon Survey	·	3.1 km	MPC · JPL
414360	2008 TH_{112}	—	October 6, 2008	Catalina	CSS	EUP	4.5 km	MPC · JPL
414361	2008 TE_{126}	—	October 8, 2008	Mount Lemmon	Mount Lemmon Survey	·	3.8 km	MPC · JPL
414362	2008 TF_{128}	—	October 8, 2008	Mount Lemmon	Mount Lemmon Survey	·	3.9 km	MPC · JPL
414363	2008 TU_{149}	—	September 4, 2008	Kitt Peak	Spacewatch	·	2.9 km	MPC · JPL
414364	2008 TZ_{149}	—	September 3, 2008	Kitt Peak	Spacewatch	·	2.8 km	MPC · JPL
414365	2008 TC_{191}	—	February 9, 1999	Kitt Peak	Spacewatch	·	2.9 km	MPC · JPL
414366	2008 UG_{9}	—	September 24, 2008	Kitt Peak	Spacewatch	·	2.8 km	MPC · JPL
414367	2008 UO_{15}	—	October 18, 2008	Kitt Peak	Spacewatch	·	3.4 km	MPC · JPL
414368	2008 UN_{68}	—	October 21, 2008	Mount Lemmon	Mount Lemmon Survey	HYG	2.8 km	MPC · JPL
414369	2008 UM_{92}	—	September 29, 2008	Catalina	CSS	TIR	3.6 km	MPC · JPL
414370	2008 UU_{113}	—	October 9, 2008	Kitt Peak	Spacewatch	·	3.3 km	MPC · JPL
414371	2008 UD_{134}	—	October 2, 2008	Mount Lemmon	Mount Lemmon Survey	CYB	4.0 km	MPC · JPL
414372	2008 UP_{204}	—	October 19, 2008	Marly	P. Kocher	TIR	3.2 km	MPC · JPL
414373	2008 UB_{236}	—	October 9, 2008	Kitt Peak	Spacewatch	·	2.9 km	MPC · JPL
414374	2008 UO_{249}	—	October 27, 2008	Mount Lemmon	Mount Lemmon Survey	·	5.4 km	MPC · JPL
414375	2008 UQ_{251}	—	October 27, 2008	Kitt Peak	Spacewatch	HYG	3.1 km	MPC · JPL
414376	2008 UB_{253}	—	October 27, 2008	Mount Lemmon	Mount Lemmon Survey	EUP	4.6 km	MPC · JPL
414377	2008 UW_{290}	—	October 22, 2008	Kitt Peak	Spacewatch	·	4.0 km	MPC · JPL
414378	2008 UV_{309}	—	October 8, 2008	Mount Lemmon	Mount Lemmon Survey	·	3.5 km	MPC · JPL
414379	2008 UR_{338}	—	October 21, 2008	Kitt Peak	Spacewatch	·	1.0 km	MPC · JPL
414380	2008 UH_{346}	—	October 24, 2008	Mount Lemmon	Mount Lemmon Survey	·	670 m	MPC · JPL
414381	2008 US_{361}	—	October 9, 2008	Mount Lemmon	Mount Lemmon Survey	·	3.2 km	MPC · JPL
414382	2008 UU_{363}	—	September 27, 2008	Catalina	CSS	·	5.0 km	MPC · JPL
414383	2008 UW_{368}	—	October 26, 2008	Mount Lemmon	Mount Lemmon Survey	CYB	4.5 km	MPC · JPL
414384	2008 VA_{73}	—	November 1, 2008	Mount Lemmon	Mount Lemmon Survey	CYB	5.5 km	MPC · JPL
414385	2008 WT_{9}	—	September 22, 2008	Mount Lemmon	Mount Lemmon Survey	·	2.5 km	MPC · JPL
414386	2008 WT_{14}	—	October 10, 2008	Mount Lemmon	Mount Lemmon Survey	·	4.0 km	MPC · JPL
414387	2008 WO_{91}	—	October 31, 2008	Mount Lemmon	Mount Lemmon Survey	·	940 m	MPC · JPL
414388	2008 WF_{130}	—	November 21, 2008	Kitt Peak	Spacewatch	·	630 m	MPC · JPL
414389	2008 XD_{51}	—	December 2, 2008	Socorro	LINEAR	·	4.4 km	MPC · JPL
414390	2008 YM_{48}	—	December 29, 2008	Mount Lemmon	Mount Lemmon Survey	·	740 m	MPC · JPL
414391	2008 YM_{54}	—	December 29, 2008	Mount Lemmon	Mount Lemmon Survey	·	980 m	MPC · JPL
414392	2008 YK_{116}	—	January 23, 2006	Kitt Peak	Spacewatch	·	690 m	MPC · JPL
414393	2008 YK_{149}	—	December 21, 2008	Kitt Peak	Spacewatch	·	600 m	MPC · JPL
414394	2009 AE_{27}	—	December 21, 2008	Mount Lemmon	Mount Lemmon Survey	·	700 m	MPC · JPL
414395	2009 AW_{33}	—	January 15, 2009	Kitt Peak	Spacewatch	·	870 m	MPC · JPL
414396	2009 AU_{44}	—	January 15, 2009	Kitt Peak	Spacewatch	V	620 m	MPC · JPL
414397	2009 AM_{50}	—	January 3, 2009	Mount Lemmon	Mount Lemmon Survey	·	670 m	MPC · JPL
414398	2009 BV_{8}	—	January 7, 2009	Kitt Peak	Spacewatch	EOS	2.8 km	MPC · JPL
414399	2009 BF_{29}	—	November 8, 2008	Mount Lemmon	Mount Lemmon Survey	·	710 m	MPC · JPL
414400	2009 BY_{31}	—	January 16, 2009	Kitt Peak	Spacewatch	·	570 m	MPC · JPL

== 414401–414500 ==
back to top

Designation			Discovery			Properties		Ref
Permanent	Provisional	Named after	Date	Site	Discoverer(s)	Category	Diam.	Ref
414401	2009 BY_{38}	—	April 30, 2006	Catalina	CSS	·	1.1 km	MPC · JPL
414402	2009 BV_{39}	—	May 7, 2006	Mount Lemmon	Mount Lemmon Survey	·	870 m	MPC · JPL
414403	2009 BY_{46}	—	January 16, 2009	Kitt Peak	Spacewatch	·	680 m	MPC · JPL
414404	2009 BK_{47}	—	January 16, 2009	Kitt Peak	Spacewatch	·	920 m	MPC · JPL
414405	2009 BC_{69}	—	January 25, 2009	Kitt Peak	Spacewatch	·	800 m	MPC · JPL
414406	2009 BL_{74}	—	January 18, 2009	Kitt Peak	Spacewatch	·	780 m	MPC · JPL
414407	2009 BE_{87}	—	January 25, 2009	Kitt Peak	Spacewatch	·	860 m	MPC · JPL
414408	2009 BJ_{107}	—	January 29, 2009	Kitt Peak	Spacewatch	·	650 m	MPC · JPL
414409	2009 BW_{110}	—	January 31, 2009	Mount Lemmon	Mount Lemmon Survey	·	990 m	MPC · JPL
414410	2009 BJ_{111}	—	January 27, 2009	Purple Mountain	PMO NEO Survey Program	·	940 m	MPC · JPL
414411	2009 BP_{112}	—	January 31, 2009	Mount Lemmon	Mount Lemmon Survey	·	650 m	MPC · JPL
414412	2009 BW_{148}	—	January 31, 2009	Kitt Peak	Spacewatch	V	620 m	MPC · JPL
414413	2009 BT_{150}	—	January 27, 2009	Purple Mountain	PMO NEO Survey Program	·	900 m	MPC · JPL
414414	2009 BN_{151}	—	January 29, 2009	Mount Lemmon	Mount Lemmon Survey	·	800 m	MPC · JPL
414415	2009 BN_{169}	—	January 20, 2009	Mount Lemmon	Mount Lemmon Survey	·	630 m	MPC · JPL
414416	2009 CF_{11}	—	February 1, 2009	Mount Lemmon	Mount Lemmon Survey	·	710 m	MPC · JPL
414417	2009 CD_{26}	—	February 1, 2009	Kitt Peak	Spacewatch	·	880 m	MPC · JPL
414418	2009 CA_{32}	—	February 1, 2009	Kitt Peak	Spacewatch	·	950 m	MPC · JPL
414419	2009 CR_{34}	—	February 2, 2009	Mount Lemmon	Mount Lemmon Survey	·	710 m	MPC · JPL
414420	2009 CS_{54}	—	January 17, 2009	Kitt Peak	Spacewatch	·	800 m	MPC · JPL
414421	2009 CA_{65}	—	February 4, 2009	Mount Lemmon	Mount Lemmon Survey	MAS	590 m	MPC · JPL
414422	2009 DV_{1}	—	February 16, 2009	Dauban	Kugel, F.	·	560 m	MPC · JPL
414423	2009 DS_{7}	—	February 19, 2009	Catalina	CSS	·	760 m	MPC · JPL
414424	2009 DW_{7}	—	February 19, 2009	Mount Lemmon	Mount Lemmon Survey	·	810 m	MPC · JPL
414425	2009 DT_{18}	—	February 19, 2009	Mount Lemmon	Mount Lemmon Survey	·	1.0 km	MPC · JPL
414426	2009 DF_{19}	—	February 20, 2009	Kitt Peak	Spacewatch	·	1.3 km	MPC · JPL
414427	2009 DU_{29}	—	February 23, 2009	Calar Alto	F. Hormuth	·	1.1 km	MPC · JPL
414428	2009 DE_{36}	—	February 21, 2009	Kitt Peak	Spacewatch	MAS	800 m	MPC · JPL
414429	2009 DC_{43}	—	February 26, 2009	Catalina	CSS	APO +1km	2.9 km	MPC · JPL
414430	2009 DD_{58}	—	February 22, 2009	Kitt Peak	Spacewatch	·	740 m	MPC · JPL
414431	2009 DP_{71}	—	February 19, 2009	La Sagra	OAM	·	840 m	MPC · JPL
414432	2009 DM_{74}	—	February 26, 2009	Catalina	CSS	NYS	1.2 km	MPC · JPL
414433	2009 DM_{77}	—	February 22, 2009	Mount Lemmon	Mount Lemmon Survey	·	860 m	MPC · JPL
414434	2009 DA_{80}	—	October 8, 2007	Mount Lemmon	Mount Lemmon Survey	·	860 m	MPC · JPL
414435	2009 DH_{112}	—	February 26, 2009	Catalina	CSS	·	700 m	MPC · JPL
414436	2009 DN_{117}	—	February 27, 2009	Kitt Peak	Spacewatch	·	700 m	MPC · JPL
414437	2009 DO_{119}	—	February 27, 2009	Kitt Peak	Spacewatch	V	580 m	MPC · JPL
414438	2009 DQ_{120}	—	March 10, 2005	Mount Lemmon	Mount Lemmon Survey	·	870 m	MPC · JPL
414439	2009 DQ_{122}	—	February 19, 2009	Kitt Peak	Spacewatch	·	650 m	MPC · JPL
414440	2009 DB_{132}	—	February 20, 2009	Mount Lemmon	Mount Lemmon Survey	·	890 m	MPC · JPL
414441	2009 DG_{138}	—	February 20, 2009	Kitt Peak	Spacewatch	·	870 m	MPC · JPL
414442	2009 EK_{20}	—	March 15, 2009	La Sagra	OAM	·	930 m	MPC · JPL
414443	2009 EB_{29}	—	March 15, 2009	Kitt Peak	Spacewatch	NYS	890 m	MPC · JPL
414444	2009 FC_{2}	—	March 17, 2009	Taunus	E. Schwab, R. Kling	·	690 m	MPC · JPL
414445	2009 FR_{23}	—	March 21, 2009	Mount Lemmon	Mount Lemmon Survey	·	1.1 km	MPC · JPL
414446	2009 FJ_{29}	—	March 22, 2009	Catalina	CSS	·	1.4 km	MPC · JPL
414447	2009 FM_{50}	—	October 10, 2007	Mount Lemmon	Mount Lemmon Survey	·	970 m	MPC · JPL
414448	2009 FG_{60}	—	March 17, 2009	Kitt Peak	Spacewatch	·	640 m	MPC · JPL
414449	2009 FD_{61}	—	October 20, 2007	Kitt Peak	Spacewatch	·	810 m	MPC · JPL
414450	2009 FJ_{73}	—	March 23, 2009	Calar Alto	F. Hormuth	·	1.0 km	MPC · JPL
414451	2009 FN_{76}	—	March 29, 2009	Kitt Peak	Spacewatch	·	1.2 km	MPC · JPL
414452	2009 GS	—	April 3, 2009	Mayhill	Lowe, A.	·	1.0 km	MPC · JPL
414453	2009 HB_{4}	—	April 17, 2009	Kitt Peak	Spacewatch	·	1.1 km	MPC · JPL
414454	2009 HX_{12}	—	April 17, 2009	Kitt Peak	Spacewatch	·	830 m	MPC · JPL
414455	2009 HO_{17}	—	April 18, 2009	Kitt Peak	Spacewatch	·	1.1 km	MPC · JPL
414456	2009 HR_{17}	—	October 14, 2007	Mount Lemmon	Mount Lemmon Survey	V	630 m	MPC · JPL
414457	2009 HV_{18}	—	April 19, 2009	Kitt Peak	Spacewatch	·	1.2 km	MPC · JPL
414458	2009 HH_{26}	—	April 18, 2009	Kitt Peak	Spacewatch	·	920 m	MPC · JPL
414459	2009 HP_{34}	—	April 20, 2009	Mount Lemmon	Mount Lemmon Survey	·	690 m	MPC · JPL
414460	2009 HL_{37}	—	April 17, 2009	Catalina	CSS	·	1.6 km	MPC · JPL
414461	2009 HC_{45}	—	April 21, 2009	La Sagra	OAM	PHO	1 km	MPC · JPL
414462	2009 HB_{46}	—	April 22, 2009	La Sagra	OAM	ERI	1.5 km	MPC · JPL
414463	2009 HL_{50}	—	April 21, 2009	Kitt Peak	Spacewatch	·	1.3 km	MPC · JPL
414464	2009 HA_{67}	—	April 26, 2009	Kitt Peak	Spacewatch	·	670 m	MPC · JPL
414465	2009 HK_{95}	—	April 29, 2009	Siding Spring	SSS	·	1.5 km	MPC · JPL
414466	2009 KQ_{7}	—	May 21, 2009	Cerro Burek	Burek, Cerro	MAS	800 m	MPC · JPL
414467	2009 KD_{14}	—	May 26, 2009	Kitt Peak	Spacewatch	PHO	1.0 km	MPC · JPL
414468	2009 KM_{14}	—	January 5, 2006	Mount Lemmon	Mount Lemmon Survey	L5	10 km	MPC · JPL
414469	2009 KK_{23}	—	May 27, 2009	Kitt Peak	Spacewatch	V	620 m	MPC · JPL
414470	2009 MQ_{8}	—	October 25, 2005	Socorro	LINEAR	·	2.6 km	MPC · JPL
414471	2009 OP_{2}	—	July 19, 2009	La Sagra	OAM	·	2.5 km	MPC · JPL
414472	2009 OH_{3}	—	June 22, 2009	Mount Lemmon	Mount Lemmon Survey	·	1.9 km	MPC · JPL
414473	2009 OQ_{4}	—	July 20, 2009	La Sagra	OAM	·	1.3 km	MPC · JPL
414474	2009 OJ_{11}	—	July 27, 2009	Kitt Peak	Spacewatch	·	1.8 km	MPC · JPL
414475	2009 OJ_{24}	—	July 31, 2009	Catalina	CSS	·	3.4 km	MPC · JPL
414476	2009 OQ_{24}	—	July 28, 2009	Kitt Peak	Spacewatch	·	1.5 km	MPC · JPL
414477	2009 PH_{2}	—	August 12, 2009	La Sagra	OAM	·	3.0 km	MPC · JPL
414478	2009 PG_{6}	—	July 18, 2009	Siding Spring	SSS	EUN	1.6 km	MPC · JPL
414479	2009 PK_{9}	—	August 15, 2009	Kitt Peak	Spacewatch	·	2.2 km	MPC · JPL
414480	2009 PY_{18}	—	August 15, 2009	Kitt Peak	Spacewatch	·	2.5 km	MPC · JPL
414481	2009 PP_{21}	—	April 5, 2008	Kitt Peak	Spacewatch	·	2.2 km	MPC · JPL
414482	2009 QC_{3}	—	August 16, 2009	Kitt Peak	Spacewatch	·	1.7 km	MPC · JPL
414483	2009 QD_{15}	—	August 16, 2009	Kitt Peak	Spacewatch	·	2.6 km	MPC · JPL
414484	2009 QF_{32}	—	November 6, 2005	Kitt Peak	Spacewatch	·	1.4 km	MPC · JPL
414485	2009 QR_{35}	—	October 25, 2005	Kitt Peak	Spacewatch	·	2.2 km	MPC · JPL
414486	2009 QE_{53}	—	August 18, 2009	Catalina	CSS	·	2.7 km	MPC · JPL
414487	2009 QV_{54}	—	August 28, 2009	Kitt Peak	Spacewatch	·	1.6 km	MPC · JPL
414488	2009 QS_{57}	—	August 17, 2009	Kitt Peak	Spacewatch	(18466)	2.8 km	MPC · JPL
414489	2009 QT_{58}	—	February 7, 2002	Kitt Peak	Spacewatch	AGN	1.5 km	MPC · JPL
414490	2009 QG_{60}	—	August 16, 2009	Catalina	CSS	·	2.3 km	MPC · JPL
414491	2009 RP_{4}	—	September 13, 2009	Bisei SG Center	BATTeRS	DOR	2.4 km	MPC · JPL
414492	2009 RK_{7}	—	September 10, 2009	La Sagra	OAM	·	2.0 km	MPC · JPL
414493	2009 RG_{8}	—	September 12, 2009	Kitt Peak	Spacewatch	DOR	2.4 km	MPC · JPL
414494	2009 RW_{10}	—	September 12, 2009	Kitt Peak	Spacewatch	KOR	1.2 km	MPC · JPL
414495	2009 RT_{12}	—	September 12, 2009	Kitt Peak	Spacewatch	·	2.2 km	MPC · JPL
414496	2009 RE_{15}	—	March 26, 2007	Kitt Peak	Spacewatch	HOF	2.8 km	MPC · JPL
414497	2009 RW_{21}	—	August 1, 2009	Kitt Peak	Spacewatch	HNS	1.2 km	MPC · JPL
414498	2009 RC_{47}	—	September 15, 2009	Kitt Peak	Spacewatch	KOR	1.1 km	MPC · JPL
414499	2009 RX_{48}	—	September 15, 2009	Kitt Peak	Spacewatch	KOR	1.2 km	MPC · JPL
414500	2009 RZ_{70}	—	September 15, 2009	Catalina	CSS	H	450 m	MPC · JPL

== 414501–414600 ==
back to top

Designation			Discovery			Properties		Ref
Permanent	Provisional	Named after	Date	Site	Discoverer(s)	Category	Diam.	Ref
414501	2009 RK_{76}	—	August 17, 2009	Catalina	CSS	·	2.8 km	MPC · JPL
414502	2009 SE_{1}	—	April 2, 2009	Mount Lemmon	Mount Lemmon Survey	L5	10 km	MPC · JPL
414503	2009 SX_{8}	—	September 16, 2009	Mount Lemmon	Mount Lemmon Survey	·	1.8 km	MPC · JPL
414504	2009 SZ_{11}	—	August 20, 2009	Kitt Peak	Spacewatch	HOF	2.1 km	MPC · JPL
414505	2009 SL_{12}	—	February 17, 2007	Mount Lemmon	Mount Lemmon Survey	·	1.9 km	MPC · JPL
414506	2009 SP_{14}	—	September 18, 2009	Bisei SG Center	BATTeRS	·	1.7 km	MPC · JPL
414507	2009 SF_{16}	—	September 20, 2009	Mayhill	Lowe, A.	·	2.5 km	MPC · JPL
414508	2009 SF_{17}	—	March 10, 2007	Mount Lemmon	Mount Lemmon Survey	AGN	1.1 km	MPC · JPL
414509	2009 SZ_{20}	—	September 24, 2009	Catalina	CSS	T_{j} (2.92)	4.2 km	MPC · JPL
414510	2009 SE_{27}	—	September 16, 2009	Kitt Peak	Spacewatch	GEF	1.6 km	MPC · JPL
414511	2009 SK_{29}	—	September 16, 2009	Kitt Peak	Spacewatch	AGN	1.2 km	MPC · JPL
414512	2009 SH_{30}	—	September 16, 2009	Kitt Peak	Spacewatch	KOR	1.3 km	MPC · JPL
414513	2009 SJ_{30}	—	September 16, 2009	Kitt Peak	Spacewatch	KOR	1.3 km	MPC · JPL
414514	2009 SU_{37}	—	September 16, 2009	Kitt Peak	Spacewatch	·	2.0 km	MPC · JPL
414515	2009 SB_{40}	—	September 16, 2009	Kitt Peak	Spacewatch	EOS	1.6 km	MPC · JPL
414516	2009 SC_{40}	—	September 16, 2009	Kitt Peak	Spacewatch	KOR	1.2 km	MPC · JPL
414517	2009 SY_{40}	—	September 16, 2009	Mount Lemmon	Mount Lemmon Survey	·	1.5 km	MPC · JPL
414518	2009 SU_{43}	—	September 16, 2009	Kitt Peak	Spacewatch	·	2.1 km	MPC · JPL
414519	2009 SU_{50}	—	September 17, 2009	Kitt Peak	Spacewatch	·	1.7 km	MPC · JPL
414520	2009 SL_{53}	—	September 17, 2009	Catalina	CSS	·	2.0 km	MPC · JPL
414521	2009 SU_{53}	—	September 17, 2009	Kitt Peak	Spacewatch	·	2.2 km	MPC · JPL
414522	2009 SF_{54}	—	September 17, 2009	Kitt Peak	Spacewatch	EOS	1.8 km	MPC · JPL
414523	2009 SR_{67}	—	September 17, 2009	Kitt Peak	Spacewatch	·	1.4 km	MPC · JPL
414524	2009 SE_{71}	—	September 17, 2009	Mount Lemmon	Mount Lemmon Survey	·	1.5 km	MPC · JPL
414525	2009 SM_{75}	—	September 17, 2009	Kitt Peak	Spacewatch	·	1.9 km	MPC · JPL
414526	2009 SO_{78}	—	October 25, 2005	Mount Lemmon	Mount Lemmon Survey	·	2.8 km	MPC · JPL
414527	2009 SB_{82}	—	August 20, 2009	Kitt Peak	Spacewatch	·	1.9 km	MPC · JPL
414528	2009 SV_{86}	—	September 18, 2009	Mount Lemmon	Mount Lemmon Survey	·	1.8 km	MPC · JPL
414529	2009 SX_{96}	—	September 21, 2009	Catalina	CSS	EOS	2.6 km	MPC · JPL
414530	2009 SV_{98}	—	September 22, 2009	Dauban	Kugel, F.	·	3.1 km	MPC · JPL
414531	2009 SL_{99}	—	September 20, 2009	Kitt Peak	Spacewatch	·	1.8 km	MPC · JPL
414532	2009 SM_{103}	—	September 25, 2009	Socorro	LINEAR	AMO +1km	1.5 km	MPC · JPL
414533	2009 SS_{114}	—	September 18, 2009	Kitt Peak	Spacewatch	·	1.9 km	MPC · JPL
414534	2009 SZ_{121}	—	September 18, 2009	Kitt Peak	Spacewatch	·	2.1 km	MPC · JPL
414535	2009 SH_{131}	—	September 18, 2009	Kitt Peak	Spacewatch	·	1.8 km	MPC · JPL
414536	2009 SK_{132}	—	September 18, 2009	Kitt Peak	Spacewatch	KOR	1.1 km	MPC · JPL
414537	2009 SZ_{135}	—	September 18, 2009	Kitt Peak	Spacewatch	·	3.6 km	MPC · JPL
414538	2009 SY_{144}	—	October 25, 2005	Mount Lemmon	Mount Lemmon Survey	AST	1.5 km	MPC · JPL
414539	2009 SJ_{151}	—	October 3, 1999	Kitt Peak	Spacewatch	KOR	1.9 km	MPC · JPL
414540	2009 SZ_{153}	—	September 20, 2009	Kitt Peak	Spacewatch	·	1.5 km	MPC · JPL
414541	2009 SX_{154}	—	April 10, 2003	Kitt Peak	Spacewatch	·	1.9 km	MPC · JPL
414542	2009 SN_{156}	—	September 12, 2009	Kitt Peak	Spacewatch	·	2.5 km	MPC · JPL
414543	2009 SO_{158}	—	September 20, 2009	Kitt Peak	Spacewatch	·	2.0 km	MPC · JPL
414544	2009 SW_{166}	—	September 22, 2009	Kitt Peak	Spacewatch	·	2.2 km	MPC · JPL
414545	2009 SN_{168}	—	February 26, 2007	Mount Lemmon	Mount Lemmon Survey	·	2.2 km	MPC · JPL
414546	2009 SR_{169}	—	August 28, 2009	Kitt Peak	Spacewatch	·	2.5 km	MPC · JPL
414547	2009 SZ_{184}	—	September 21, 2009	Kitt Peak	Spacewatch	·	2.2 km	MPC · JPL
414548	2009 SU_{188}	—	December 3, 2005	Kitt Peak	Spacewatch	GEF	1.7 km	MPC · JPL
414549	2009 SA_{191}	—	December 4, 2005	Kitt Peak	Spacewatch	·	1.9 km	MPC · JPL
414550	2009 SL_{215}	—	September 24, 2009	Kitt Peak	Spacewatch	615	1.1 km	MPC · JPL
414551	2009 ST_{217}	—	September 24, 2009	Mount Lemmon	Mount Lemmon Survey	DOR	1.8 km	MPC · JPL
414552	2009 SD_{239}	—	September 17, 2009	Catalina	CSS	·	1.7 km	MPC · JPL
414553	2009 SP_{241}	—	September 18, 2009	Catalina	CSS	LUT	4.8 km	MPC · JPL
414554	2009 SK_{259}	—	August 16, 2009	Kitt Peak	Spacewatch	·	1.7 km	MPC · JPL
414555	2009 SX_{262}	—	September 24, 1995	Kitt Peak	Spacewatch	·	2.0 km	MPC · JPL
414556	2009 SC_{265}	—	September 23, 2009	Mount Lemmon	Mount Lemmon Survey	·	1.8 km	MPC · JPL
414557	2009 SJ_{274}	—	September 25, 2009	Kitt Peak	Spacewatch	·	2.1 km	MPC · JPL
414558	2009 SU_{274}	—	September 25, 2009	Kitt Peak	Spacewatch	·	2.4 km	MPC · JPL
414559	2009 SQ_{281}	—	September 17, 2009	Kitt Peak	Spacewatch	·	2.0 km	MPC · JPL
414560	2009 SD_{296}	—	September 27, 2009	Mount Lemmon	Mount Lemmon Survey	·	2.1 km	MPC · JPL
414561	2009 SW_{299}	—	September 17, 2009	Kitt Peak	Spacewatch	615	2.0 km	MPC · JPL
414562	2009 SU_{300}	—	March 20, 2007	Kitt Peak	Spacewatch	·	2.4 km	MPC · JPL
414563	2009 SY_{300}	—	September 16, 2009	Kitt Peak	Spacewatch	·	1.7 km	MPC · JPL
414564	2009 SM_{305}	—	January 17, 2007	Kitt Peak	Spacewatch	·	2.7 km	MPC · JPL
414565	2009 SV_{316}	—	August 18, 2009	Kitt Peak	Spacewatch	·	2.3 km	MPC · JPL
414566	2009 SM_{320}	—	September 21, 2009	Catalina	CSS	(18466)	2.5 km	MPC · JPL
414567	2009 SA_{323}	—	September 14, 2009	Kitt Peak	Spacewatch	·	2.7 km	MPC · JPL
414568	2009 ST_{325}	—	September 27, 2009	Mount Lemmon	Mount Lemmon Survey	H	530 m	MPC · JPL
414569	2009 SB_{331}	—	September 19, 2009	Catalina	CSS	·	2.7 km	MPC · JPL
414570	2009 SW_{331}	—	September 20, 2009	Catalina	CSS	·	2.5 km	MPC · JPL
414571	2009 SZ_{332}	—	September 12, 2009	Kitt Peak	Spacewatch	H	540 m	MPC · JPL
414572	2009 SZ_{350}	—	September 28, 2009	Mount Lemmon	Mount Lemmon Survey	·	2.5 km	MPC · JPL
414573	2009 SO_{354}	—	September 22, 2009	Mount Lemmon	Mount Lemmon Survey	·	2.5 km	MPC · JPL
414574	2009 SX_{355}	—	September 21, 2009	Mount Lemmon	Mount Lemmon Survey	·	1.5 km	MPC · JPL
414575	2009 SN_{356}	—	September 16, 2009	Mount Lemmon	Mount Lemmon Survey	·	2.7 km	MPC · JPL
414576	2009 SE_{357}	—	September 20, 2009	Kitt Peak	Spacewatch	·	2.0 km	MPC · JPL
414577	2009 SO_{357}	—	September 22, 2009	Mount Lemmon	Mount Lemmon Survey	·	3.0 km	MPC · JPL
414578	2009 SF_{358}	—	December 4, 2005	Mount Lemmon	Mount Lemmon Survey	KOR	1.2 km	MPC · JPL
414579	2009 SG_{360}	—	September 27, 2009	Mount Lemmon	Mount Lemmon Survey	·	2.7 km	MPC · JPL
414580	2009 ST_{362}	—	October 23, 2004	Kitt Peak	Spacewatch	·	2.3 km	MPC · JPL
414581	2009 SY_{363}	—	September 26, 2009	Kitt Peak	Spacewatch	EOS	1.9 km	MPC · JPL
414582	2009 TB_{9}	—	October 12, 2009	La Sagra	OAM	H	650 m	MPC · JPL
414583	2009 TK_{18}	—	September 12, 2009	Kitt Peak	Spacewatch	·	1.7 km	MPC · JPL
414584	2009 TH_{42}	—	October 11, 2009	Mount Lemmon	Mount Lemmon Survey	·	2.0 km	MPC · JPL
414585	2009 UU_{18}	—	October 23, 2009	Tzec Maun	Tozzi, F.	T_{j} (2.97)	5.0 km	MPC · JPL
414586	2009 UV_{18}	—	October 22, 2009	Socorro	LINEAR	T_{j} (2.84) · AMO +1km	1 km	MPC · JPL
414587	2009 UP_{23}	—	October 18, 2009	Mount Lemmon	Mount Lemmon Survey	EMA	5.6 km	MPC · JPL
414588	2009 US_{27}	—	October 21, 2009	Catalina	CSS	·	3.2 km	MPC · JPL
414589	2009 UW_{29}	—	October 8, 2004	Kitt Peak	Spacewatch	·	1.4 km	MPC · JPL
414590	2009 UJ_{31}	—	October 18, 2009	Mount Lemmon	Mount Lemmon Survey	·	1.6 km	MPC · JPL
414591	2009 UO_{33}	—	October 18, 2009	Mount Lemmon	Mount Lemmon Survey	·	1.7 km	MPC · JPL
414592	2009 UM_{39}	—	October 22, 2009	Mount Lemmon	Mount Lemmon Survey	·	2.2 km	MPC · JPL
414593	2009 UM_{40}	—	October 18, 2009	Mount Lemmon	Mount Lemmon Survey	·	1.8 km	MPC · JPL
414594	2009 UM_{53}	—	October 22, 2009	Catalina	CSS	·	4.6 km	MPC · JPL
414595	2009 UF_{57}	—	October 23, 2009	Mount Lemmon	Mount Lemmon Survey	·	1.9 km	MPC · JPL
414596	2009 UE_{60}	—	September 16, 2004	Kitt Peak	Spacewatch	·	1.6 km	MPC · JPL
414597	2009 UY_{71}	—	October 23, 2009	Mount Lemmon	Mount Lemmon Survey	KOR	1.4 km	MPC · JPL
414598	2009 UZ_{81}	—	April 7, 2006	Kitt Peak	Spacewatch	·	3.2 km	MPC · JPL
414599	2009 UF_{89}	—	October 26, 2009	Farra d'Isonzo	Farra d'Isonzo	·	3.4 km	MPC · JPL
414600	2009 UT_{89}	—	September 21, 2009	Mount Lemmon	Mount Lemmon Survey	·	3.3 km	MPC · JPL

== 414601–414700 ==
back to top

Designation			Discovery			Properties		Ref
Permanent	Provisional	Named after	Date	Site	Discoverer(s)	Category	Diam.	Ref
414601	2009 UE_{102}	—	October 24, 2009	Catalina	CSS	·	2.3 km	MPC · JPL
414602	2009 UJ_{105}	—	October 25, 2009	Kitt Peak	Spacewatch	·	2.2 km	MPC · JPL
414603	2009 UL_{106}	—	September 21, 2009	Mount Lemmon	Mount Lemmon Survey	·	1.7 km	MPC · JPL
414604	2009 UM_{106}	—	October 21, 2009	Mount Lemmon	Mount Lemmon Survey	·	3.4 km	MPC · JPL
414605	2009 UO_{106}	—	September 21, 2009	Mount Lemmon	Mount Lemmon Survey	·	2.3 km	MPC · JPL
414606	2009 UG_{108}	—	October 18, 2009	Mount Lemmon	Mount Lemmon Survey	·	3.8 km	MPC · JPL
414607	2009 US_{108}	—	October 23, 2009	Kitt Peak	Spacewatch	EOS	2.0 km	MPC · JPL
414608	2009 UL_{115}	—	September 20, 2009	Kitt Peak	Spacewatch	·	1.5 km	MPC · JPL
414609	2009 UM_{132}	—	October 16, 2009	Catalina	CSS	EUP	4.7 km	MPC · JPL
414610	2009 UF_{134}	—	October 22, 2009	Mount Lemmon	Mount Lemmon Survey	EOS	2.0 km	MPC · JPL
414611	2009 UT_{140}	—	October 26, 2009	Kitt Peak	Spacewatch	·	2.9 km	MPC · JPL
414612	2009 UD_{143}	—	October 18, 2009	Mount Lemmon	Mount Lemmon Survey	·	3.1 km	MPC · JPL
414613	2009 UH_{144}	—	October 23, 2009	Mount Lemmon	Mount Lemmon Survey	·	2.5 km	MPC · JPL
414614	2009 UM_{144}	—	October 16, 2009	Catalina	CSS	(58892)	3.4 km	MPC · JPL
414615	2009 UP_{147}	—	October 16, 2009	Mount Lemmon	Mount Lemmon Survey	·	5.1 km	MPC · JPL
414616	2009 US_{147}	—	October 17, 2009	Mount Lemmon	Mount Lemmon Survey	·	2.8 km	MPC · JPL
414617	2009 UU_{150}	—	October 23, 2009	Mount Lemmon	Mount Lemmon Survey	·	3.1 km	MPC · JPL
414618	2009 UQ_{151}	—	October 18, 2009	Mount Lemmon	Mount Lemmon Survey	LIX	4.2 km	MPC · JPL
414619	2009 UU_{154}	—	October 17, 2009	Mount Lemmon	Mount Lemmon Survey	·	1.5 km	MPC · JPL
414620	2009 VU_{3}	—	September 18, 2009	Mount Lemmon	Mount Lemmon Survey	EOS	1.9 km	MPC · JPL
414621	2009 VN_{5}	—	November 8, 2009	Catalina	CSS	·	3.5 km	MPC · JPL
414622	2009 VS_{11}	—	October 23, 2009	Kitt Peak	Spacewatch	·	3.1 km	MPC · JPL
414623	2009 VK_{12}	—	November 8, 2009	Mount Lemmon	Mount Lemmon Survey	·	2.9 km	MPC · JPL
414624	2009 VR_{12}	—	November 8, 2009	Mount Lemmon	Mount Lemmon Survey	KOR	1.3 km	MPC · JPL
414625	2009 VT_{18}	—	November 9, 2009	Kitt Peak	Spacewatch	·	2.0 km	MPC · JPL
414626	2009 VK_{19}	—	November 9, 2009	Kitt Peak	Spacewatch	·	1.8 km	MPC · JPL
414627	2009 VM_{20}	—	October 23, 2009	Mount Lemmon	Mount Lemmon Survey	·	2.1 km	MPC · JPL
414628	2009 VO_{22}	—	May 2, 2006	Mount Lemmon	Mount Lemmon Survey	·	3.1 km	MPC · JPL
414629	2009 VX_{24}	—	May 3, 2008	Kitt Peak	Spacewatch	·	2.1 km	MPC · JPL
414630	2009 VM_{29}	—	October 18, 2009	Mount Lemmon	Mount Lemmon Survey	·	5.3 km	MPC · JPL
414631	2009 VZ_{31}	—	October 23, 2009	Kitt Peak	Spacewatch	KOR	1.2 km	MPC · JPL
414632	2009 VW_{34}	—	November 10, 2009	Mount Lemmon	Mount Lemmon Survey	·	3.4 km	MPC · JPL
414633	2009 VJ_{37}	—	November 8, 2009	Kitt Peak	Spacewatch	·	2.8 km	MPC · JPL
414634	2009 VL_{37}	—	November 8, 2009	Kitt Peak	Spacewatch	EOS	2.0 km	MPC · JPL
414635	2009 VY_{37}	—	October 21, 2009	Mount Lemmon	Mount Lemmon Survey	·	2.9 km	MPC · JPL
414636	2009 VR_{42}	—	September 22, 2009	Mount Lemmon	Mount Lemmon Survey	·	2.8 km	MPC · JPL
414637	2009 VS_{42}	—	September 23, 2009	Mount Lemmon	Mount Lemmon Survey	EMA	3.9 km	MPC · JPL
414638	2009 VU_{46}	—	October 12, 2009	Mount Lemmon	Mount Lemmon Survey	EOS	2.0 km	MPC · JPL
414639	2009 VB_{60}	—	November 9, 2009	Catalina	CSS	·	3.8 km	MPC · JPL
414640	2009 VZ_{61}	—	October 21, 2009	Mount Lemmon	Mount Lemmon Survey	·	4.1 km	MPC · JPL
414641	2009 VM_{62}	—	November 8, 2009	Kitt Peak	Spacewatch	EOS	1.7 km	MPC · JPL
414642	2009 VA_{64}	—	November 8, 2009	Kitt Peak	Spacewatch	·	3.4 km	MPC · JPL
414643	2009 VT_{64}	—	November 9, 2009	Kitt Peak	Spacewatch	·	3.0 km	MPC · JPL
414644	2009 VX_{64}	—	October 26, 2009	Kitt Peak	Spacewatch	·	1.6 km	MPC · JPL
414645	2009 VP_{66}	—	November 9, 2009	Kitt Peak	Spacewatch	EOS	2.1 km	MPC · JPL
414646	2009 VV_{67}	—	November 9, 2009	Kitt Peak	Spacewatch	·	2.5 km	MPC · JPL
414647	2009 VX_{67}	—	November 9, 2009	Kitt Peak	Spacewatch	·	1.7 km	MPC · JPL
414648	2009 VA_{69}	—	November 9, 2009	Kitt Peak	Spacewatch	·	2.4 km	MPC · JPL
414649	2009 VG_{71}	—	September 30, 2009	Mount Lemmon	Mount Lemmon Survey	EOS	1.9 km	MPC · JPL
414650	2009 VL_{80}	—	November 11, 2009	Catalina	CSS	·	3.0 km	MPC · JPL
414651	2009 VU_{81}	—	September 19, 2009	Mount Lemmon	Mount Lemmon Survey	·	2.4 km	MPC · JPL
414652	2009 VF_{83}	—	November 9, 2009	Kitt Peak	Spacewatch	EOS	1.8 km	MPC · JPL
414653	2009 VF_{94}	—	November 8, 2009	Kitt Peak	Spacewatch	KOR	1.5 km	MPC · JPL
414654	2009 VJ_{94}	—	November 8, 2009	Kitt Peak	Spacewatch	KOR	1.4 km	MPC · JPL
414655	2009 VR_{103}	—	November 23, 2003	Kitt Peak	Spacewatch	·	2.9 km	MPC · JPL
414656	2009 VT_{116}	—	November 8, 2009	Mount Lemmon	Mount Lemmon Survey	EOS	4.0 km	MPC · JPL
414657	2009 WR_{4}	—	November 16, 2009	Mount Lemmon	Mount Lemmon Survey	·	3.5 km	MPC · JPL
414658	2009 WZ_{9}	—	November 19, 2009	Socorro	LINEAR	·	2.1 km	MPC · JPL
414659	2009 WM_{11}	—	November 16, 2009	Kitt Peak	Spacewatch	·	2.9 km	MPC · JPL
414660	2009 WW_{26}	—	November 16, 2009	Kitt Peak	Spacewatch	EOS	2.0 km	MPC · JPL
414661	2009 WB_{31}	—	October 26, 2009	Mount Lemmon	Mount Lemmon Survey	·	3.7 km	MPC · JPL
414662	2009 WM_{34}	—	November 16, 2009	Kitt Peak	Spacewatch	·	4.5 km	MPC · JPL
414663	2009 WW_{34}	—	November 16, 2009	Kitt Peak	Spacewatch	THM	2.1 km	MPC · JPL
414664	2009 WX_{34}	—	November 16, 2009	Mount Lemmon	Mount Lemmon Survey	·	2.6 km	MPC · JPL
414665	2009 WX_{38}	—	October 16, 2009	Mount Lemmon	Mount Lemmon Survey	·	3.9 km	MPC · JPL
414666	2009 WH_{39}	—	February 24, 2006	Mount Lemmon	Mount Lemmon Survey	EOS	2.1 km	MPC · JPL
414667	2009 WZ_{42}	—	November 17, 2009	Kitt Peak	Spacewatch	H	700 m	MPC · JPL
414668	2009 WQ_{44}	—	October 23, 2009	Kitt Peak	Spacewatch	·	1.7 km	MPC · JPL
414669	2009 WQ_{69}	—	November 18, 2009	Kitt Peak	Spacewatch	·	4.5 km	MPC · JPL
414670	2009 WM_{70}	—	September 21, 2009	Mount Lemmon	Mount Lemmon Survey	TIR	3.6 km	MPC · JPL
414671	2009 WT_{73}	—	November 18, 2009	Kitt Peak	Spacewatch	EOS	1.9 km	MPC · JPL
414672	2009 WB_{78}	—	November 18, 2009	Kitt Peak	Spacewatch	·	3.2 km	MPC · JPL
414673	2009 WM_{81}	—	November 18, 2009	Kitt Peak	Spacewatch	·	4.5 km	MPC · JPL
414674	2009 WN_{83}	—	November 19, 2009	Kitt Peak	Spacewatch	·	2.3 km	MPC · JPL
414675	2009 WO_{85}	—	November 19, 2009	Kitt Peak	Spacewatch	NAE	5.2 km	MPC · JPL
414676	2009 WA_{87}	—	September 28, 2003	Kitt Peak	Spacewatch	·	2.8 km	MPC · JPL
414677	2009 WX_{87}	—	April 18, 2007	Mount Lemmon	Mount Lemmon Survey	·	2.7 km	MPC · JPL
414678	2009 WN_{107}	—	October 26, 2009	Kitt Peak	Spacewatch	·	1.9 km	MPC · JPL
414679	2009 WT_{117}	—	October 21, 2009	Mount Lemmon	Mount Lemmon Survey	·	3.2 km	MPC · JPL
414680	2009 WW_{123}	—	November 20, 2009	Kitt Peak	Spacewatch	·	2.6 km	MPC · JPL
414681	2009 WB_{125}	—	November 20, 2009	Kitt Peak	Spacewatch	THM	2.3 km	MPC · JPL
414682	2009 WY_{128}	—	November 20, 2009	Mount Lemmon	Mount Lemmon Survey	·	3.7 km	MPC · JPL
414683	2009 WH_{131}	—	January 17, 2005	Kitt Peak	Spacewatch	THM	2.1 km	MPC · JPL
414684	2009 WJ_{131}	—	September 19, 2003	Kitt Peak	Spacewatch	THM	2.3 km	MPC · JPL
414685	2009 WR_{135}	—	November 23, 2009	Mount Lemmon	Mount Lemmon Survey	·	1.6 km	MPC · JPL
414686	2009 WH_{139}	—	November 10, 2009	Mount Lemmon	Mount Lemmon Survey	·	4.2 km	MPC · JPL
414687	2009 WO_{140}	—	November 18, 2009	Mount Lemmon	Mount Lemmon Survey	·	4.6 km	MPC · JPL
414688	2009 WN_{151}	—	January 23, 2006	Kitt Peak	Spacewatch	·	1.9 km	MPC · JPL
414689	2009 WS_{153}	—	November 19, 2009	Mount Lemmon	Mount Lemmon Survey	·	4.5 km	MPC · JPL
414690	2009 WO_{154}	—	November 19, 2009	Mount Lemmon	Mount Lemmon Survey	EOS	4.0 km	MPC · JPL
414691	2009 WO_{155}	—	November 9, 2009	Catalina	CSS	EOS	2.3 km	MPC · JPL
414692	2009 WF_{156}	—	October 16, 2009	Mount Lemmon	Mount Lemmon Survey	·	1.3 km	MPC · JPL
414693	2009 WC_{159}	—	November 20, 2009	Mount Lemmon	Mount Lemmon Survey	·	4.3 km	MPC · JPL
414694	2009 WZ_{160}	—	September 4, 2008	Kitt Peak	Spacewatch	·	1.9 km	MPC · JPL
414695	2009 WL_{161}	—	November 9, 2009	Mount Lemmon	Mount Lemmon Survey	·	4.3 km	MPC · JPL
414696	2009 WV_{162}	—	October 30, 2009	Mount Lemmon	Mount Lemmon Survey	·	2.2 km	MPC · JPL
414697	2009 WH_{163}	—	November 21, 2009	Kitt Peak	Spacewatch	·	3.0 km	MPC · JPL
414698	2009 WR_{163}	—	October 1, 2003	Kitt Peak	Spacewatch	·	2.1 km	MPC · JPL
414699	2009 WC_{166}	—	November 17, 2009	Kitt Peak	Spacewatch	·	3.9 km	MPC · JPL
414700	2009 WB_{169}	—	November 22, 2009	Kitt Peak	Spacewatch	EOS	2.0 km	MPC · JPL

== 414701–414800 ==
back to top

Designation			Discovery			Properties		Ref
Permanent	Provisional	Named after	Date	Site	Discoverer(s)	Category	Diam.	Ref
414701	2009 WJ_{170}	—	November 22, 2009	Kitt Peak	Spacewatch	·	2.6 km	MPC · JPL
414702	2009 WK_{170}	—	October 17, 2009	Mount Lemmon	Mount Lemmon Survey	EOS	2.2 km	MPC · JPL
414703	2009 WY_{173}	—	November 22, 2009	Kitt Peak	Spacewatch	·	2.2 km	MPC · JPL
414704	2009 WF_{182}	—	November 23, 2009	Kitt Peak	Spacewatch	·	4.1 km	MPC · JPL
414705	2009 WM_{184}	—	November 10, 2009	Kitt Peak	Spacewatch	HYG	2.4 km	MPC · JPL
414706	2009 WN_{190}	—	November 16, 1998	Kitt Peak	Spacewatch	·	1.8 km	MPC · JPL
414707	2009 WX_{196}	—	July 27, 2009	Kitt Peak	Spacewatch	·	3.3 km	MPC · JPL
414708	2009 WV_{202}	—	October 27, 2009	Kitt Peak	Spacewatch	·	2.2 km	MPC · JPL
414709	2009 WL_{209}	—	November 17, 2009	Catalina	CSS	·	2.3 km	MPC · JPL
414710	2009 WS_{212}	—	September 16, 2003	Kitt Peak	Spacewatch	HYG	2.4 km	MPC · JPL
414711	2009 WP_{214}	—	November 20, 2009	Kitt Peak	Spacewatch	·	4.1 km	MPC · JPL
414712	2009 WB_{218}	—	November 18, 2009	Kitt Peak	Spacewatch	·	3.5 km	MPC · JPL
414713	2009 WQ_{218}	—	November 30, 2000	Kitt Peak	Spacewatch	·	2.4 km	MPC · JPL
414714	2009 WE_{223}	—	September 15, 1998	Kitt Peak	Spacewatch	·	1.4 km	MPC · JPL
414715	2009 WG_{230}	—	November 17, 2009	Mount Lemmon	Mount Lemmon Survey	·	1.4 km	MPC · JPL
414716	2009 WV_{236}	—	November 16, 2009	Kitt Peak	Spacewatch	·	2.0 km	MPC · JPL
414717	2009 WK_{239}	—	November 17, 2009	Mount Lemmon	Mount Lemmon Survey	·	2.9 km	MPC · JPL
414718	2009 WV_{247}	—	November 16, 2009	Kitt Peak	Spacewatch	EMA	4.5 km	MPC · JPL
414719	2009 WD_{249}	—	November 18, 2009	Kitt Peak	Spacewatch	·	8.1 km	MPC · JPL
414720	2009 WJ_{252}	—	November 25, 2009	Kitt Peak	Spacewatch	(31811)	3.9 km	MPC · JPL
414721	2009 WN_{256}	—	November 24, 2009	Kitt Peak	Spacewatch	·	4.5 km	MPC · JPL
414722	2009 XP_{3}	—	December 9, 2009	La Sagra	OAM	·	1.8 km	MPC · JPL
414723	2009 XB_{5}	—	December 10, 2009	Mount Lemmon	Mount Lemmon Survey	·	2.0 km	MPC · JPL
414724	2009 XU_{7}	—	November 9, 2009	Mount Lemmon	Mount Lemmon Survey	·	3.3 km	MPC · JPL
414725	2009 XP_{11}	—	December 10, 2009	La Sagra	OAM	·	3.1 km	MPC · JPL
414726	2009 XO_{13}	—	December 13, 2009	Mount Lemmon	Mount Lemmon Survey	·	2.3 km	MPC · JPL
414727	2009 XN_{20}	—	December 10, 2009	Mount Lemmon	Mount Lemmon Survey	THM	3.2 km	MPC · JPL
414728	2009 XS_{22}	—	December 13, 2009	Catalina	CSS	·	4.0 km	MPC · JPL
414729	2009 YH_{1}	—	December 17, 2009	Mount Lemmon	Mount Lemmon Survey	EOS	1.8 km	MPC · JPL
414730	2009 YH_{5}	—	December 17, 2009	Mount Lemmon	Mount Lemmon Survey	·	2.8 km	MPC · JPL
414731	2009 YH_{19}	—	December 26, 2009	Sierra Stars	Stars, Sierra	·	3.6 km	MPC · JPL
414732	2009 YS_{23}	—	December 17, 2009	Mount Lemmon	Mount Lemmon Survey	·	4.3 km	MPC · JPL
414733	2010 AO_{18}	—	November 11, 2009	Mount Lemmon	Mount Lemmon Survey	THM	2.0 km	MPC · JPL
414734	2010 AO_{23}	—	November 21, 2009	Mount Lemmon	Mount Lemmon Survey	·	4.1 km	MPC · JPL
414735	2010 AH_{59}	—	October 30, 2009	Mount Lemmon	Mount Lemmon Survey	T_{j} (2.97)	5.2 km	MPC · JPL
414736	2010 AD_{66}	—	January 11, 2010	Mount Lemmon	Mount Lemmon Survey	·	4.4 km	MPC · JPL
414737	2010 AU_{76}	—	January 6, 2010	Catalina	CSS	T_{j} (2.99) · EUP	4.5 km	MPC · JPL
414738	2010 AB_{77}	—	January 7, 2010	Mount Lemmon	Mount Lemmon Survey	·	1.9 km	MPC · JPL
414739	2010 AL_{77}	—	January 12, 2010	Catalina	CSS	LIX	4.1 km	MPC · JPL
414740	2010 BP_{4}	—	November 21, 2009	Mount Lemmon	Mount Lemmon Survey	·	5.4 km	MPC · JPL
414741	2010 CZ_{55}	—	February 12, 2010	Socorro	LINEAR	·	2.2 km	MPC · JPL
414742	2010 CZ_{75}	—	February 13, 2010	Mount Lemmon	Mount Lemmon Survey	H	760 m	MPC · JPL
414743	2010 CG_{132}	—	November 10, 2009	Catalina	CSS	·	4.5 km	MPC · JPL
414744	2010 DK_{57}	—	March 3, 2006	Mount Lemmon	Mount Lemmon Survey	·	3.0 km	MPC · JPL
414745	2010 EX_{13}	—	March 5, 2010	WISE	WISE	·	6.2 km	MPC · JPL
414746	2010 EH_{20}	—	March 6, 2010	WISE	WISE	AMO +1km	1.8 km	MPC · JPL
414747	2010 EL_{28}	—	March 9, 2010	WISE	WISE	·	3.7 km	MPC · JPL
414748	2010 EW_{124}	—	March 12, 2010	Kitt Peak	Spacewatch	T_{j} (2.98)	4.0 km	MPC · JPL
414749	2010 FC_{56}	—	March 19, 2010	Kitt Peak	Spacewatch	H	720 m	MPC · JPL
414750	2010 FV_{73}	—	March 30, 2010	WISE	WISE	·	1.4 km	MPC · JPL
414751	2010 FV_{97}	—	April 7, 2007	Mount Lemmon	Mount Lemmon Survey	·	700 m	MPC · JPL
414752	2010 GN_{1}	—	December 15, 2009	Mount Lemmon	Mount Lemmon Survey	·	5.4 km	MPC · JPL
414753	2010 GK_{28}	—	April 6, 2010	Kitt Peak	Spacewatch	·	840 m	MPC · JPL
414754	2010 GN_{59}	—	December 20, 2009	Catalina	CSS	·	3.9 km	MPC · JPL
414755	2010 GK_{92}	—	April 14, 2010	WISE	WISE	·	2.0 km	MPC · JPL
414756	2010 GD_{103}	—	August 22, 1995	Kitt Peak	Spacewatch	·	850 m	MPC · JPL
414757	2010 GH_{130}	—	October 7, 2004	Kitt Peak	Spacewatch	·	570 m	MPC · JPL
414758	2010 GS_{131}	—	April 10, 2010	Kitt Peak	Spacewatch	·	590 m	MPC · JPL
414759	2010 JP	—	May 3, 2010	Kitt Peak	Spacewatch	·	960 m	MPC · JPL
414760	2010 JM_{47}	—	August 9, 2004	Anderson Mesa	LONEOS	·	800 m	MPC · JPL
414761	2010 JH_{74}	—	April 26, 2000	Kitt Peak	Spacewatch	(883)	600 m	MPC · JPL
414762	2010 KZ_{104}	—	May 29, 2010	WISE	WISE	·	2.1 km	MPC · JPL
414763	2010 KH_{121}	—	November 19, 2000	Socorro	LINEAR	PHO	2.8 km	MPC · JPL
414764	2010 LE_{1}	—	June 1, 2010	Kitt Peak	Spacewatch	·	2.1 km	MPC · JPL
414765	2010 LW_{33}	—	August 29, 2006	Anderson Mesa	LONEOS	·	1.5 km	MPC · JPL
414766	2010 MN_{2}	—	June 18, 2010	Westfield	Astronomical Research Observatory	·	2.6 km	MPC · JPL
414767	2010 MC_{27}	—	June 19, 2010	WISE	WISE	·	1.2 km	MPC · JPL
414768	2010 MF_{90}	—	November 28, 1999	Kitt Peak	Spacewatch	·	1.5 km	MPC · JPL
414769	2010 NV_{21}	—	July 6, 2010	WISE	WISE	·	1.6 km	MPC · JPL
414770	2010 OZ_{30}	—	July 20, 2010	WISE	WISE	·	2.6 km	MPC · JPL
414771	2010 OW_{46}	—	October 27, 2006	Catalina	CSS	·	1.9 km	MPC · JPL
414772	2010 OC_{103}	—	July 28, 2010	WISE	WISE	APO +1km	1.5 km	MPC · JPL
414773	2010 OP_{112}	—	November 10, 2006	Kitt Peak	Spacewatch	·	1.3 km	MPC · JPL
414774	2010 PO_{24}	—	August 6, 2010	Westfield	Singh, A., Wadhwa, S.	·	1.1 km	MPC · JPL
414775	2010 PN_{56}	—	August 8, 2010	WISE	WISE	·	2.3 km	MPC · JPL
414776	2010 PE_{59}	—	November 5, 2007	Kitt Peak	Spacewatch	·	1.2 km	MPC · JPL
414777	2010 PX_{60}	—	June 19, 2010	Kitt Peak	Spacewatch	V	760 m	MPC · JPL
414778	2010 PQ_{61}	—	August 10, 2010	Kitt Peak	Spacewatch	·	1.3 km	MPC · JPL
414779	2010 PN_{74}	—	June 19, 2010	Mount Lemmon	Mount Lemmon Survey	·	1.0 km	MPC · JPL
414780	2010 PV_{77}	—	August 10, 2010	XuYi	PMO NEO Survey Program	NYS	1.2 km	MPC · JPL
414781	2010 QM_{1}	—	October 4, 1999	Kitt Peak	Spacewatch	NYS	1.0 km	MPC · JPL
414782	2010 QH_{3}	—	July 20, 1999	Kitt Peak	Spacewatch	·	1.0 km	MPC · JPL
414783	2010 QD_{4}	—	August 20, 2010	La Sagra	OAM	·	1.0 km	MPC · JPL
414784	2010 RT_{25}	—	September 3, 2010	Socorro	LINEAR	V	740 m	MPC · JPL
414785	2010 RA_{40}	—	September 3, 2010	Socorro	LINEAR	·	1.5 km	MPC · JPL
414786	2010 RE_{48}	—	December 27, 1999	Kitt Peak	Spacewatch	·	1.1 km	MPC · JPL
414787	2010 RE_{57}	—	March 2, 2005	Kitt Peak	Spacewatch	·	1.4 km	MPC · JPL
414788	2010 RW_{59}	—	September 6, 2010	Kitt Peak	Spacewatch	·	1.5 km	MPC · JPL
414789	2010 RY_{80}	—	August 28, 2006	Catalina	CSS	·	1.1 km	MPC · JPL
414790	2010 RE_{106}	—	September 10, 2010	Kitt Peak	Spacewatch	V	720 m	MPC · JPL
414791	2010 RD_{126}	—	September 12, 2010	Kitt Peak	Spacewatch	·	1.2 km	MPC · JPL
414792	2010 RO_{134}	—	February 2, 2008	Kitt Peak	Spacewatch	MAS	820 m	MPC · JPL
414793	2010 RR_{138}	—	March 6, 2008	Mount Lemmon	Mount Lemmon Survey	BAR	1.2 km	MPC · JPL
414794	2010 RV_{146}	—	August 21, 2006	Kitt Peak	Spacewatch	·	910 m	MPC · JPL
414795	2010 RU_{151}	—	February 26, 2009	Mount Lemmon	Mount Lemmon Survey	·	1.2 km	MPC · JPL
414796	2010 RU_{166}	—	August 12, 2010	Kitt Peak	Spacewatch	·	1.1 km	MPC · JPL
414797	2010 RN_{173}	—	September 5, 2010	Mount Lemmon	Mount Lemmon Survey	·	1.6 km	MPC · JPL
414798	2010 RB_{176}	—	November 19, 2003	Kitt Peak	Spacewatch	·	1.4 km	MPC · JPL
414799	2010 RH_{184}	—	December 14, 2007	Mount Lemmon	Mount Lemmon Survey	·	1.8 km	MPC · JPL
414800	2010 SV_{3}	—	September 17, 2010	Catalina	CSS	APO	260 m	MPC · JPL

== 414801–414900 ==
back to top

Designation			Discovery			Properties		Ref
Permanent	Provisional	Named after	Date	Site	Discoverer(s)	Category	Diam.	Ref
414801	2010 SL_{18}	—	September 25, 2006	Kitt Peak	Spacewatch	·	740 m	MPC · JPL
414802	2010 SK_{19}	—	March 12, 2008	Kitt Peak	Spacewatch	·	1.1 km	MPC · JPL
414803	2010 SS_{23}	—	November 19, 2003	Kitt Peak	Spacewatch	MAS	560 m	MPC · JPL
414804	2010 SN_{29}	—	January 18, 2008	Kitt Peak	Spacewatch	·	1.2 km	MPC · JPL
414805	2010 SB_{35}	—	September 25, 2006	Mount Lemmon	Mount Lemmon Survey	·	1.1 km	MPC · JPL
414806	2010 SP_{37}	—	October 12, 1999	Kitt Peak	Spacewatch	·	890 m	MPC · JPL
414807	2010 TW_{15}	—	October 3, 2010	Kitt Peak	Spacewatch	·	1.6 km	MPC · JPL
414808	2010 TF_{16}	—	September 8, 2010	Kitt Peak	Spacewatch	·	1.8 km	MPC · JPL
414809	2010 TR_{20}	—	December 5, 2007	Kitt Peak	Spacewatch	NYS	1.2 km	MPC · JPL
414810	2010 TQ_{25}	—	March 3, 2009	Kitt Peak	Spacewatch	·	1.1 km	MPC · JPL
414811	2010 TS_{27}	—	October 2, 2010	Kitt Peak	Spacewatch	RAF	890 m	MPC · JPL
414812	2010 TD_{36}	—	March 8, 2008	Kitt Peak	Spacewatch	EUN	1.5 km	MPC · JPL
414813	2010 TR_{60}	—	September 19, 2006	Kitt Peak	Spacewatch	·	1.1 km	MPC · JPL
414814	2010 TL_{79}	—	October 3, 2006	Mount Lemmon	Mount Lemmon Survey	KON	1.6 km	MPC · JPL
414815	2010 TX_{126}	—	September 30, 2006	Catalina	CSS	·	1.4 km	MPC · JPL
414816	2010 TN_{127}	—	December 16, 2007	Mount Lemmon	Mount Lemmon Survey	·	2.1 km	MPC · JPL
414817	2010 TL_{149}	—	December 17, 2006	Catalina	CSS	JUN	1.0 km	MPC · JPL
414818	2010 UR_{11}	—	October 19, 2010	Mount Lemmon	Mount Lemmon Survey	·	1.9 km	MPC · JPL
414819	2010 UV_{14}	—	April 4, 2008	Kitt Peak	Spacewatch	·	1.4 km	MPC · JPL
414820	2010 UF_{21}	—	October 28, 2010	Kitt Peak	Spacewatch	EUN	1.2 km	MPC · JPL
414821	2010 UV_{26}	—	March 29, 2008	Kitt Peak	Spacewatch	·	1.5 km	MPC · JPL
414822	2010 UF_{27}	—	November 17, 2006	Kitt Peak	Spacewatch	(5)	1.0 km	MPC · JPL
414823	2010 UC_{34}	—	March 1, 2008	Mount Lemmon	Mount Lemmon Survey	·	1.7 km	MPC · JPL
414824	2010 UG_{36}	—	December 14, 2006	Kitt Peak	Spacewatch	·	1.3 km	MPC · JPL
414825	2010 UP_{39}	—	October 13, 2010	Catalina	CSS	·	1.3 km	MPC · JPL
414826	2010 UZ_{44}	—	September 30, 2006	Mount Lemmon	Mount Lemmon Survey	EUN	1.1 km	MPC · JPL
414827	2010 UV_{49}	—	September 17, 2010	Mount Lemmon	Mount Lemmon Survey	EUN	920 m	MPC · JPL
414828	2010 UM_{54}	—	March 5, 2008	Mount Lemmon	Mount Lemmon Survey	·	1.3 km	MPC · JPL
414829	2010 UF_{59}	—	October 29, 2010	Kitt Peak	Spacewatch	·	2.0 km	MPC · JPL
414830	2010 UC_{60}	—	December 15, 2006	Kitt Peak	Spacewatch	·	1.2 km	MPC · JPL
414831	2010 UX_{60}	—	November 17, 2006	Kitt Peak	Spacewatch	(5)	940 m	MPC · JPL
414832	2010 UF_{75}	—	October 30, 2010	Catalina	CSS	·	1.5 km	MPC · JPL
414833	2010 UJ_{76}	—	October 30, 2010	Kitt Peak	Spacewatch	(5)	1.4 km	MPC · JPL
414834	2010 UY_{77}	—	October 30, 2010	Kitt Peak	Spacewatch	·	1.3 km	MPC · JPL
414835	2010 UW_{78}	—	November 15, 2006	Kitt Peak	Spacewatch	·	1.2 km	MPC · JPL
414836	2010 UE_{80}	—	March 20, 2004	Kitt Peak	Spacewatch	·	1.4 km	MPC · JPL
414837	2010 UY_{93}	—	December 10, 2006	Kitt Peak	Spacewatch	·	2.1 km	MPC · JPL
414838	2010 UY_{96}	—	October 28, 2010	Kitt Peak	Spacewatch	ADE	1.9 km	MPC · JPL
414839	2010 UZ_{99}	—	March 4, 2005	Mount Lemmon	Mount Lemmon Survey	MAS	850 m	MPC · JPL
414840	2010 UD_{105}	—	February 13, 2008	Kitt Peak	Spacewatch	·	1.7 km	MPC · JPL
414841	2010 VF_{22}	—	February 28, 2008	Kitt Peak	Spacewatch	·	1.4 km	MPC · JPL
414842	2010 VP_{26}	—	November 1, 2010	Kitt Peak	Spacewatch	·	1.3 km	MPC · JPL
414843	2010 VR_{30}	—	October 19, 2010	Mount Lemmon	Mount Lemmon Survey	·	2.1 km	MPC · JPL
414844	2010 VY_{30}	—	September 11, 2010	Mount Lemmon	Mount Lemmon Survey	·	1.4 km	MPC · JPL
414845	2010 VH_{31}	—	November 21, 2006	Mount Lemmon	Mount Lemmon Survey	KON	1.9 km	MPC · JPL
414846	2010 VE_{47}	—	November 2, 2010	Kitt Peak	Spacewatch	·	1.4 km	MPC · JPL
414847	2010 VN_{49}	—	October 30, 2010	Catalina	CSS	ADE	1.9 km	MPC · JPL
414848	2010 VV_{51}	—	November 3, 2010	Mount Lemmon	Mount Lemmon Survey	·	1.6 km	MPC · JPL
414849	2010 VO_{61}	—	October 7, 2005	Kitt Peak	Spacewatch	·	1.7 km	MPC · JPL
414850	2010 VK_{63}	—	October 28, 2010	Mount Lemmon	Mount Lemmon Survey	·	2.5 km	MPC · JPL
414851	2010 VF_{65}	—	September 18, 1993	Kitt Peak	Spacewatch	·	1.1 km	MPC · JPL
414852	2010 VS_{70}	—	August 10, 2010	Kitt Peak	Spacewatch	·	1.6 km	MPC · JPL
414853	2010 VD_{80}	—	November 18, 2006	Kitt Peak	Spacewatch	·	1.1 km	MPC · JPL
414854	2010 VU_{80}	—	November 22, 2006	Kitt Peak	Spacewatch	KON	2.6 km	MPC · JPL
414855	2010 VN_{82}	—	November 23, 2006	Kitt Peak	Spacewatch	·	1.1 km	MPC · JPL
414856	2010 VS_{83}	—	May 5, 2008	Mount Lemmon	Mount Lemmon Survey	·	1.5 km	MPC · JPL
414857	2010 VO_{84}	—	December 13, 2006	Mount Lemmon	Mount Lemmon Survey	·	1.2 km	MPC · JPL
414858	2010 VD_{86}	—	October 28, 2010	Kitt Peak	Spacewatch	·	1.3 km	MPC · JPL
414859	2010 VG_{89}	—	January 8, 2007	Kitt Peak	Spacewatch	·	1.4 km	MPC · JPL
414860	2010 VW_{89}	—	October 14, 2001	Socorro	LINEAR	·	2.0 km	MPC · JPL
414861	2010 VQ_{95}	—	February 10, 2008	Kitt Peak	Spacewatch	·	1.2 km	MPC · JPL
414862	2010 VM_{102}	—	March 10, 2008	Kitt Peak	Spacewatch	·	1.4 km	MPC · JPL
414863	2010 VU_{102}	—	November 16, 2006	Mount Lemmon	Mount Lemmon Survey	·	1.4 km	MPC · JPL
414864	2010 VE_{108}	—	September 11, 2010	Mount Lemmon	Mount Lemmon Survey	·	1.1 km	MPC · JPL
414865	2010 VA_{115}	—	November 8, 2010	Kitt Peak	Spacewatch	·	1.2 km	MPC · JPL
414866	2010 VT_{117}	—	August 29, 2005	Kitt Peak	Spacewatch	·	1.8 km	MPC · JPL
414867	2010 VV_{118}	—	December 13, 2006	Kitt Peak	Spacewatch	·	2.1 km	MPC · JPL
414868	2010 VP_{131}	—	November 11, 2006	Kitt Peak	Spacewatch	EUN	1.2 km	MPC · JPL
414869	2010 VB_{152}	—	October 23, 2006	Mount Lemmon	Mount Lemmon Survey	·	1.3 km	MPC · JPL
414870	2010 VW_{163}	—	October 30, 2010	Kitt Peak	Spacewatch	EUN	1.4 km	MPC · JPL
414871	2010 VG_{167}	—	April 5, 2008	Mount Lemmon	Mount Lemmon Survey	·	1.6 km	MPC · JPL
414872	2010 VJ_{171}	—	November 10, 2010	Mount Lemmon	Mount Lemmon Survey	·	1.8 km	MPC · JPL
414873	2010 VV_{176}	—	March 27, 2008	Kitt Peak	Spacewatch	·	1.4 km	MPC · JPL
414874	2010 VA_{185}	—	November 22, 2006	Mount Lemmon	Mount Lemmon Survey	·	1.3 km	MPC · JPL
414875	2010 VY_{191}	—	November 23, 2006	Kitt Peak	Spacewatch	·	990 m	MPC · JPL
414876	2010 VA_{192}	—	October 19, 2006	Mount Lemmon	Mount Lemmon Survey	·	1.1 km	MPC · JPL
414877	2010 VF_{193}	—	September 28, 2006	Mount Lemmon	Mount Lemmon Survey	(5)	1.1 km	MPC · JPL
414878	2010 VM_{194}	—	November 13, 2010	Mount Lemmon	Mount Lemmon Survey	·	1.6 km	MPC · JPL
414879	2010 VQ_{204}	—	October 17, 2010	Mount Lemmon	Mount Lemmon Survey	·	1.3 km	MPC · JPL
414880	2010 VD_{212}	—	March 31, 2008	Mount Lemmon	Mount Lemmon Survey	·	1.6 km	MPC · JPL
414881	2010 VY_{218}	—	August 26, 2001	Anderson Mesa	LONEOS	ADE	2.0 km	MPC · JPL
414882	2010 VW_{219}	—	October 17, 2010	Mount Lemmon	Mount Lemmon Survey	(5)	1.0 km	MPC · JPL
414883	2010 WR_{5}	—	November 27, 2010	Mount Lemmon	Mount Lemmon Survey	·	2.1 km	MPC · JPL
414884	2010 WR_{21}	—	November 1, 2010	Kitt Peak	Spacewatch	·	1.3 km	MPC · JPL
414885	2010 WP_{32}	—	August 31, 2005	Kitt Peak	Spacewatch	·	1.3 km	MPC · JPL
414886	2010 WB_{46}	—	November 27, 2010	Mount Lemmon	Mount Lemmon Survey	·	1.5 km	MPC · JPL
414887	2010 WM_{49}	—	December 11, 2006	Kitt Peak	Spacewatch	·	1.5 km	MPC · JPL
414888	2010 WG_{50}	—	November 8, 2010	Kitt Peak	Spacewatch	·	1.3 km	MPC · JPL
414889	2010 WX_{50}	—	October 27, 2006	Mount Lemmon	Mount Lemmon Survey	·	1.2 km	MPC · JPL
414890	2010 WE_{67}	—	November 1, 2006	Mount Lemmon	Mount Lemmon Survey	·	2.0 km	MPC · JPL
414891	2010 XO_{12}	—	February 9, 2007	Catalina	CSS	·	1.2 km	MPC · JPL
414892	2010 XS_{15}	—	April 28, 2004	Kitt Peak	Spacewatch	·	1.1 km	MPC · JPL
414893	2010 XF_{16}	—	May 14, 2008	Mount Lemmon	Mount Lemmon Survey	NEM	2.1 km	MPC · JPL
414894	2010 XE_{19}	—	December 14, 2006	Kitt Peak	Spacewatch	MAR	1.3 km	MPC · JPL
414895	2010 XR_{20}	—	November 25, 2006	Mount Lemmon	Mount Lemmon Survey	·	1.5 km	MPC · JPL
414896	2010 XP_{22}	—	March 31, 2008	Kitt Peak	Spacewatch	·	1.2 km	MPC · JPL
414897	2010 XG_{24}	—	December 13, 2006	Kitt Peak	Spacewatch	·	1.3 km	MPC · JPL
414898	2010 XW_{37}	—	December 17, 2006	Mount Lemmon	Mount Lemmon Survey	·	1.3 km	MPC · JPL
414899	2010 XJ_{38}	—	October 30, 2005	Mount Lemmon	Mount Lemmon Survey	·	1.7 km	MPC · JPL
414900	2010 XV_{38}	—	September 4, 2010	Kitt Peak	Spacewatch	·	1.4 km	MPC · JPL

== 414901–415000 ==
back to top

Designation			Discovery			Properties		Ref
Permanent	Provisional	Named after	Date	Site	Discoverer(s)	Category	Diam.	Ref
414901	2010 XT_{39}	—	November 25, 2006	Catalina	CSS	·	1.1 km	MPC · JPL
414902	2010 XD_{42}	—	April 25, 2003	Kitt Peak	Spacewatch	HOF	2.7 km	MPC · JPL
414903	2010 XT_{45}	—	August 10, 2010	Kitt Peak	Spacewatch	AMO +1km	1.2 km	MPC · JPL
414904	2010 XN_{64}	—	December 21, 2006	Kitt Peak	Spacewatch	WIT	920 m	MPC · JPL
414905	2010 XR_{64}	—	November 6, 2010	Mount Lemmon	Mount Lemmon Survey	WIT	1.1 km	MPC · JPL
414906	2010 XK_{69}	—	January 28, 2007	Mount Lemmon	Mount Lemmon Survey	·	1.6 km	MPC · JPL
414907	2010 XN_{71}	—	August 24, 2001	Anderson Mesa	LONEOS	·	1.7 km	MPC · JPL
414908	2010 XH_{76}	—	December 21, 2006	Mount Lemmon	Mount Lemmon Survey	·	1.3 km	MPC · JPL
414909	2010 XL_{76}	—	December 12, 2006	Kitt Peak	Spacewatch	·	1.8 km	MPC · JPL
414910	2010 XB_{84}	—	December 2, 2010	Mount Lemmon	Mount Lemmon Survey	(5)	1.2 km	MPC · JPL
414911	2010 YE_{1}	—	February 23, 2007	Kitt Peak	Spacewatch	·	1.3 km	MPC · JPL
414912	2010 YN_{2}	—	August 18, 2009	Kitt Peak	Spacewatch	·	1.8 km	MPC · JPL
414913	2010 YY_{4}	—	December 14, 2010	Mount Lemmon	Mount Lemmon Survey	·	1.0 km	MPC · JPL
414914	2011 AF_{9}	—	February 25, 2007	Mount Lemmon	Mount Lemmon Survey	·	1.5 km	MPC · JPL
414915	2011 AR_{9}	—	November 1, 2005	Mount Lemmon	Mount Lemmon Survey	·	2.4 km	MPC · JPL
414916	2011 AU_{11}	—	December 6, 2010	Mount Lemmon	Mount Lemmon Survey	·	1.9 km	MPC · JPL
414917	2011 AA_{20}	—	December 30, 2005	Socorro	LINEAR	·	1.9 km	MPC · JPL
414918	2011 AX_{27}	—	December 5, 2010	Mount Lemmon	Mount Lemmon Survey	·	1.8 km	MPC · JPL
414919	2011 AP_{31}	—	November 7, 2010	Mount Lemmon	Mount Lemmon Survey	·	2.6 km	MPC · JPL
414920	2011 AG_{33}	—	November 1, 2005	Mount Lemmon	Mount Lemmon Survey	·	1.7 km	MPC · JPL
414921	2011 AX_{34}	—	March 13, 2007	Catalina	CSS	·	1.7 km	MPC · JPL
414922	2011 AT_{36}	—	June 19, 2007	Kitt Peak	Spacewatch	EOS	2.1 km	MPC · JPL
414923	2011 AT_{39}	—	December 5, 2010	Mount Lemmon	Mount Lemmon Survey	EOS	2.1 km	MPC · JPL
414924	2011 AC_{41}	—	October 15, 2009	Catalina	CSS	EOS	2.6 km	MPC · JPL
414925	2011 AG_{45}	—	January 10, 2011	Kitt Peak	Spacewatch	·	3.5 km	MPC · JPL
414926	2011 AP_{45}	—	November 25, 2005	Catalina	CSS	·	2.2 km	MPC · JPL
414927	2011 AG_{49}	—	March 21, 2002	Kitt Peak	Spacewatch	·	4.1 km	MPC · JPL
414928	2011 AM_{49}	—	October 24, 2005	Kitt Peak	Spacewatch	·	1.5 km	MPC · JPL
414929	2011 AV_{52}	—	October 26, 2009	Kitt Peak	Spacewatch	·	2.5 km	MPC · JPL
414930	2011 AH_{57}	—	January 11, 2011	Kitt Peak	Spacewatch	·	4.1 km	MPC · JPL
414931	2011 AQ_{63}	—	December 10, 2010	Mount Lemmon	Mount Lemmon Survey	EOS	2.3 km	MPC · JPL
414932	2011 AC_{66}	—	January 13, 2000	Kitt Peak	Spacewatch	EOS	2.4 km	MPC · JPL
414933	2011 AH_{67}	—	October 4, 2004	Kitt Peak	Spacewatch	·	1.8 km	MPC · JPL
414934	2011 AW_{69}	—	January 7, 2006	Kitt Peak	Spacewatch	EOS	1.6 km	MPC · JPL
414935	2011 AD_{75}	—	December 8, 2005	Catalina	CSS	·	2.3 km	MPC · JPL
414936	2011 BJ_{1}	—	December 2, 2005	Socorro	LINEAR	·	1.8 km	MPC · JPL
414937	2011 BV_{6}	—	January 7, 2011	Kitt Peak	Spacewatch	HOF	2.1 km	MPC · JPL
414938	2011 BK_{7}	—	October 24, 2005	Kitt Peak	Spacewatch	·	1.4 km	MPC · JPL
414939	2011 BC_{17}	—	January 2, 2011	Catalina	CSS	·	2.3 km	MPC · JPL
414940	2011 BN_{27}	—	January 25, 2011	Kitt Peak	Spacewatch	(5)	1.4 km	MPC · JPL
414941	2011 BX_{34}	—	September 5, 2008	Kitt Peak	Spacewatch	·	2.8 km	MPC · JPL
414942	2011 BX_{45}	—	December 11, 2004	Kitt Peak	Spacewatch	·	3.0 km	MPC · JPL
414943	2011 BS_{53}	—	January 12, 2011	Kitt Peak	Spacewatch	EOS	2.1 km	MPC · JPL
414944	2011 BM_{55}	—	December 25, 2005	Kitt Peak	Spacewatch	·	1.8 km	MPC · JPL
414945	2011 BR_{56}	—	November 29, 2005	Kitt Peak	Spacewatch	·	1.8 km	MPC · JPL
414946	2011 BG_{57}	—	December 28, 2005	Kitt Peak	Spacewatch	DOR	2.4 km	MPC · JPL
414947	2011 BH_{70}	—	November 25, 2005	Catalina	CSS	·	1.9 km	MPC · JPL
414948	2011 BM_{70}	—	January 27, 2011	Kitt Peak	Spacewatch	·	3.0 km	MPC · JPL
414949	2011 BK_{84}	—	April 11, 2007	Mount Lemmon	Mount Lemmon Survey	·	1.9 km	MPC · JPL
414950	2011 BU_{85}	—	January 27, 2011	Kitt Peak	Spacewatch	EOS	2.0 km	MPC · JPL
414951	2011 BF_{98}	—	January 10, 2011	Mount Lemmon	Mount Lemmon Survey	·	2.6 km	MPC · JPL
414952	2011 BU_{100}	—	February 8, 2000	Kitt Peak	Spacewatch	·	2.4 km	MPC · JPL
414953	2011 BO_{101}	—	December 8, 2005	Kitt Peak	Spacewatch	·	1.9 km	MPC · JPL
414954	2011 BF_{116}	—	January 20, 2002	Kitt Peak	Spacewatch	·	1.5 km	MPC · JPL
414955	2011 BC_{117}	—	October 5, 2005	Catalina	CSS	·	1.6 km	MPC · JPL
414956	2011 BZ_{117}	—	January 31, 2006	Kitt Peak	Spacewatch	·	5.0 km	MPC · JPL
414957	2011 BE_{119}	—	December 25, 2005	Mount Lemmon	Mount Lemmon Survey	·	2.0 km	MPC · JPL
414958	2011 BH_{119}	—	December 25, 2005	Kitt Peak	Spacewatch	·	1.8 km	MPC · JPL
414959	2011 BS_{122}	—	February 22, 2006	Kitt Peak	Spacewatch	·	3.8 km	MPC · JPL
414960	2011 CS_{4}	—	January 16, 2011	Mount Lemmon	Mount Lemmon Survey	AMO	350 m	MPC · JPL
414961	2011 CS_{5}	—	May 16, 2007	Mount Lemmon	Mount Lemmon Survey	·	2.1 km	MPC · JPL
414962	2011 CD_{7}	—	August 22, 2004	Kitt Peak	Spacewatch	·	2.2 km	MPC · JPL
414963	2011 CV_{9}	—	December 9, 2010	Mount Lemmon	Mount Lemmon Survey	·	3.2 km	MPC · JPL
414964	2011 CY_{9}	—	January 10, 2006	Mount Lemmon	Mount Lemmon Survey	EOS	2.0 km	MPC · JPL
414965	2011 CQ_{15}	—	September 16, 2009	Kitt Peak	Spacewatch	·	2.1 km	MPC · JPL
414966	2011 CX_{22}	—	November 19, 2009	Kitt Peak	Spacewatch	·	2.6 km	MPC · JPL
414967	2011 CX_{34}	—	December 29, 2005	Socorro	LINEAR	·	2.1 km	MPC · JPL
414968	2011 CK_{37}	—	March 3, 2006	Kitt Peak	Spacewatch	·	2.3 km	MPC · JPL
414969	2011 CP_{50}	—	September 30, 2009	Mount Lemmon	Mount Lemmon Survey	·	2.9 km	MPC · JPL
414970	2011 CN_{69}	—	September 26, 2005	Kitt Peak	Spacewatch	·	1.3 km	MPC · JPL
414971	2011 CY_{78}	—	September 22, 2009	Mount Lemmon	Mount Lemmon Survey	·	2.3 km	MPC · JPL
414972	2011 CP_{85}	—	September 4, 2008	Kitt Peak	Spacewatch	·	2.7 km	MPC · JPL
414973	2011 CH_{88}	—	January 26, 2006	Mount Lemmon	Mount Lemmon Survey	·	1.9 km	MPC · JPL
414974	2011 CP_{106}	—	August 24, 2008	Kitt Peak	Spacewatch	·	2.8 km	MPC · JPL
414975	2011 CP_{108}	—	September 30, 2003	Kitt Peak	Spacewatch	·	2.1 km	MPC · JPL
414976	2011 DJ_{1}	—	August 21, 2008	Kitt Peak	Spacewatch	·	3.2 km	MPC · JPL
414977	2011 DD_{3}	—	December 14, 2010	Mount Lemmon	Mount Lemmon Survey	·	1.6 km	MPC · JPL
414978	2011 DY_{11}	—	February 25, 2006	Mount Lemmon	Mount Lemmon Survey	·	2.1 km	MPC · JPL
414979	2011 DN_{12}	—	October 30, 2009	Mount Lemmon	Mount Lemmon Survey	·	2.6 km	MPC · JPL
414980	2011 DB_{21}	—	January 6, 2002	Kitt Peak	Spacewatch	·	2.1 km	MPC · JPL
414981	2011 DR_{22}	—	April 19, 2006	Kitt Peak	Spacewatch	·	2.2 km	MPC · JPL
414982	2011 DX_{22}	—	October 2, 2008	Kitt Peak	Spacewatch	·	2.8 km	MPC · JPL
414983	2011 DU_{37}	—	September 7, 2008	Mount Lemmon	Mount Lemmon Survey	·	3.5 km	MPC · JPL
414984	2011 EB_{3}	—	September 6, 2008	Mount Lemmon	Mount Lemmon Survey	·	2.9 km	MPC · JPL
414985	2011 EM_{6}	—	April 5, 2000	Socorro	LINEAR	·	4.5 km	MPC · JPL
414986	2011 EW_{12}	—	November 11, 2009	Kitt Peak	Spacewatch	·	3.8 km	MPC · JPL
414987	2011 EN_{23}	—	January 8, 2011	Mount Lemmon	Mount Lemmon Survey	EOS	2.3 km	MPC · JPL
414988	2011 EX_{23}	—	September 30, 2009	Mount Lemmon	Mount Lemmon Survey	·	2.3 km	MPC · JPL
414989	2011 ES_{47}	—	March 2, 2005	Kitt Peak	Spacewatch	·	3.5 km	MPC · JPL
414990	2011 EM_{51}	—	March 10, 2011	Kitt Peak	Spacewatch	APO · PHA	150 m	MPC · JPL
414991	2011 EO_{73}	—	September 7, 2008	Mount Lemmon	Mount Lemmon Survey	EUP	3.8 km	MPC · JPL
414992	2011 EK_{77}	—	November 4, 2004	Kitt Peak	Spacewatch	·	1.8 km	MPC · JPL
414993	2011 EA_{78}	—	September 1, 2005	Kitt Peak	Spacewatch	·	1.7 km	MPC · JPL
414994	2011 ES_{80}	—	December 8, 2004	Socorro	LINEAR	·	3.0 km	MPC · JPL
414995	2011 EO_{84}	—	April 30, 2006	Kitt Peak	Spacewatch	·	2.6 km	MPC · JPL
414996	2011 FJ	—	February 26, 2000	Kitt Peak	Spacewatch	·	3.5 km	MPC · JPL
414997	2011 FN_{28}	—	April 5, 2000	Socorro	LINEAR	·	3.4 km	MPC · JPL
414998	2011 FA_{35}	—	January 16, 2000	Kitt Peak	Spacewatch	·	1.6 km	MPC · JPL
414999	2011 FJ_{55}	—	December 16, 2004	Kitt Peak	Spacewatch	·	2.5 km	MPC · JPL
415000	2011 FB_{56}	—	February 23, 2011	Kitt Peak	Spacewatch	·	2.6 km	MPC · JPL

back to top

== Meaning of names ==
As minor planet discoveries are confirmed, they are given a permanent number by the IAU's Minor Planet Center (MPC), and the discoverers can then submit names for them, following the IAU's naming conventions. The list below concerns those minor planets in the specified number-range that have received names, and explains the meanings of those names.

Official naming citations of newly named small Solar System bodies are approved and published in a bulletin by IAU's Working Group for Small Bodies Nomenclature (WGSBN). Before May 2021, citations were published in MPC's Minor Planet Circulars for many decades. Recent citations can also be found on the JPL Small-Body Database (SBDB). Until his death in 2016, German astronomer Lutz D. Schmadel compiled these citations into the Dictionary of Minor Planet Names (DMP) and regularly updated the collection.

Based on Paul Herget's The Names of the Minor Planets, Schmadel also researched the unclear origin of numerous asteroids, most of which had been named prior to World War II. This article incorporates text from this source, which is in the public domain: SBDB New namings may only be added to this list below after official publication as the preannouncement of names is condemned. The WGSBN publishes a comprehensive guideline for the naming rules of non-cometary small Solar System bodies.

Named minor planet	Provisional	This minor planet was named for...	Ref · Catalog
414026 Bochonko	2007 LX_{29}	Richard Bochonko (1941–2014), a professor of mathematics, physics and astronomy at the University of Manitoba.	JPL · 414026
414283 Lécureuil	2008 MW_{4}	Patrick Lécureuil (b. 1970), a French astronomer.	IAU · 414283
