= Meanings of minor-planet names: 378001–379000 =

As minor planet discoveries are confirmed, they are given a permanent number by the IAU's Minor Planet Center (MPC), and the discoverers can then submit names for them, following the IAU's naming conventions. The list below concerns those minor planets in the specified number-range that have received names, and explains the meanings of those names.

Official naming citations of newly named small Solar System bodies are approved and published in a bulletin by IAU's Working Group for Small Bodies Nomenclature (WGSBN). Before May 2021, citations were published in MPC's Minor Planet Circulars for many decades. Recent citations can also be found on the JPL Small-Body Database (SBDB). Until his death in 2016, German astronomer Lutz D. Schmadel compiled these citations into the Dictionary of Minor Planet Names (DMP) and regularly updated the collection.

Based on Paul Herget's The Names of the Minor Planets, Schmadel also researched the unclear origin of numerous asteroids, most of which had been named prior to World War II. This article incorporates text from this source, which is in the public domain: SBDB New namings may only be added to this list below after official publication as the preannouncement of names is condemned. The WGSBN publishes a comprehensive guideline for the naming rules of non-cometary small Solar System bodies.

== 378001–378100 ==
Named minor planet	Provisional	This minor planet was named for...	Ref · Catalog
378002 ʻAkialoa	2006 RK_{112}	The ʻakialoa are a group of birds that were native to the Hawaiian Islands. They had a long, curved bill that took up one-third of their body length, and had yellow plumage. The ʻakialoa are now extinct on Oʻahu and Maui, and likely on Kauaʻi.	JPL · 378002
378076 Campani	2006 UQ_{64}	Giuseppe Campani (c.1636–1715) was an Italian astronomer and telescope maker.	IAU · 378076

== 378101–378200 ==
back to top

Named minor planet	Provisional	This minor planet was named for...	Ref · Catalog
There are no named minor planets in this number range

== 378201–378300 ==
back to top

Named minor planet	Provisional	This minor planet was named for...	Ref · Catalog
378204 Bettyhesser	2006 YF_{49}	Betty Hinsdale Hesser (born 1938), passionately curious about, and gifted in languages, music and science, generously shares in an easily accessible manner her extensive knowledge, particularly about astronomy and reptiles, with people of all ages to address common misunderstandings and stimulate broader comprehension of nature.	JPL · 378204
378214 Sauron	2007 AP_{11}	Sauron is a fictional character in J. R. R. Tolkien's fantasy novel The Lord of the Rings. He created the One Ring to rule the rings of power. Due to Sauron's war-like nature, a Mars-crossing minor planet was chosen to receive his name.	JPL · 378214

== 378301–378400 ==
back to top

Named minor planet	Provisional	This minor planet was named for...	Ref · Catalog
378370 Orton	2007 ON_{5}	Glenn Orton (born 1948) is a senior research scientist at NASA's Jet Propulsion Laboratory, and principal investigator of atmospheric structures of both Jupiter and Saturn. He is a member of the American Astronomical Society and the IAU, as well as the American and European Geophysical Unions.	JPL · 378370

== 378401–378500 ==
back to top

Named minor planet	Provisional	This minor planet was named for...	Ref · Catalog
There are no named minor planets in this number range

== 378501–378600 ==
back to top

Named minor planet	Provisional	This minor planet was named for...	Ref · Catalog
There are no named minor planets in this number range

== 378601–378700 ==
back to top

Named minor planet	Provisional	This minor planet was named for...	Ref · Catalog
378669 Rivas	2008 HO_{4}	Marc Rivas (born 1942), a French amateur astronomer.	JPL · 378669

== 378701–378800 ==
back to top

Named minor planet	Provisional	This minor planet was named for...	Ref · Catalog
378721 Thizy	2008 QP_{14}	Olivier Thizy (born 1966), a French engineer.	JPL · 378721

== 378801–378900 ==
back to top

Named minor planet	Provisional	This minor planet was named for...	Ref · Catalog
378810 Deniserothrock	2008 SG_{209}	Denise Rothrock, American middle- and high-school science teacher. She taught astronomy to Texan students for sixteen years.	IAU · 378810

== 378901–379000 ==
back to top

Named minor planet	Provisional	This minor planet was named for...	Ref · Catalog
378917 Stefankarge	2008 UP_{91}	Stefan Karge (born 1963), a German amateur astronomer and discoverer of minor planets	JPL · 378917
378920 Vassimre	2008 UP_{95}	Imre Vass (1795–1863) was a Hungarian geodesist, cartographer and speleologist, known for exploring the Baradla cave.	IAU · 378920

back to top

Preceded by 377,001–378,000	Meanings of minor-planet names List of minor planets: 378,001–379,000	Succeeded by 379,001–380,000
