= List of minor planets: 378001–379000 =

The following is a partial list of minor planets, running from minor-planet number 378001 through 379000, inclusive. The primary data for this and other partial lists is based on JPL's "Small-Body Orbital Elements" and data available from the Minor Planet Center. Critical list information is also provided by the MPC, unless otherwise specified from Lowell Observatory. A detailed description of the table's columns and additional sources are given on the main page including a complete list of every page in this series, and a statistical break-up on the dynamical classification of minor planets.

Also see the summary list of all named bodies in numerical and alphabetical order, and the corresponding naming citations for the number range of this particular list. New namings may only be added to this list after official publication, as the preannouncement of names is condemned by the Working Group for Small Bodies Nomenclature of the International Astronomical Union.

Near-Earth obj.	MBA (inner)	MBA (outer)	Centaur
Mars-crosser	MBA (middle)	Jupiter trojan	Trans-Neptunian obj.
Unclassified

== 378001–378100 ==
Designation			Discovery			Properties		Ref
Permanent	Provisional	Named after	Date	Site	Discoverer(s)	Category	Diam.	Ref
378001	2006 RR_{98}	—	September 15, 2006	Kitt Peak	Spacewatch	·	680 m	MPC · JPL
378002 ʻAkialoa	2006 RK_{112}	ʻAkialoa	September 14, 2006	Mauna Kea	Masiero, J.	V	550 m	MPC · JPL
378003	2006 SW	—	September 17, 2006	Pla D'Arguines	R. Ferrando	·	730 m	MPC · JPL
378004	2006 SX_{25}	—	September 16, 2006	Catalina	CSS	·	820 m	MPC · JPL
378005	2006 SR_{31}	—	September 17, 2006	Kitt Peak	Spacewatch	·	760 m	MPC · JPL
378006	2006 SX_{32}	—	September 17, 2006	Kitt Peak	Spacewatch	·	690 m	MPC · JPL
378007	2006 SQ_{38}	—	September 18, 2006	Kitt Peak	Spacewatch	·	820 m	MPC · JPL
378008	2006 SO_{43}	—	September 16, 2006	Catalina	CSS	·	950 m	MPC · JPL
378009	2006 SG_{46}	—	September 18, 2006	Kitt Peak	Spacewatch	·	850 m	MPC · JPL
378010	2006 SP_{60}	—	September 18, 2006	Catalina	CSS	·	920 m	MPC · JPL
378011	2006 SK_{69}	—	September 19, 2006	Kitt Peak	Spacewatch	·	560 m	MPC · JPL
378012	2006 SU_{70}	—	September 19, 2006	Kitt Peak	Spacewatch	·	730 m	MPC · JPL
378013	2006 SV_{71}	—	September 19, 2006	Kitt Peak	Spacewatch	·	1.2 km	MPC · JPL
378014	2006 SP_{149}	—	September 19, 2006	Kitt Peak	Spacewatch	·	790 m	MPC · JPL
378015	2006 SM_{156}	—	September 23, 2006	Kitt Peak	Spacewatch	·	690 m	MPC · JPL
378016	2006 SS_{161}	—	September 24, 2006	Kitt Peak	Spacewatch	·	620 m	MPC · JPL
378017	2006 SB_{163}	—	September 24, 2006	Kitt Peak	Spacewatch	·	820 m	MPC · JPL
378018	2006 SW_{164}	—	September 25, 2006	Kitt Peak	Spacewatch	·	930 m	MPC · JPL
378019	2006 SL_{185}	—	September 25, 2006	Kitt Peak	Spacewatch	·	600 m	MPC · JPL
378020	2006 SQ_{256}	—	September 26, 2006	Kitt Peak	Spacewatch	·	790 m	MPC · JPL
378021	2006 SM_{259}	—	September 26, 2006	Kitt Peak	Spacewatch	·	610 m	MPC · JPL
378022	2006 SD_{283}	—	September 18, 2006	Anderson Mesa	LONEOS	·	710 m	MPC · JPL
378023	2006 SS_{311}	—	September 27, 2006	Kitt Peak	Spacewatch	·	740 m	MPC · JPL
378024	2006 SV_{314}	—	September 27, 2006	Kitt Peak	Spacewatch	·	1.7 km	MPC · JPL
378025	2006 SX_{321}	—	September 27, 2006	Kitt Peak	Spacewatch	·	800 m	MPC · JPL
378026	2006 SQ_{324}	—	September 17, 2006	Kitt Peak	Spacewatch	HOF	2.3 km	MPC · JPL
378027	2006 SX_{326}	—	September 27, 2006	Kitt Peak	Spacewatch	·	730 m	MPC · JPL
378028	2006 SU_{337}	—	September 28, 2006	Kitt Peak	Spacewatch	·	710 m	MPC · JPL
378029	2006 SZ_{337}	—	September 28, 2006	Kitt Peak	Spacewatch	·	570 m	MPC · JPL
378030	2006 SG_{352}	—	September 30, 2006	Catalina	CSS	·	630 m	MPC · JPL
378031	2006 SZ_{355}	—	September 30, 2006	Catalina	CSS	·	730 m	MPC · JPL
378032	2006 SH_{363}	—	September 30, 2006	Mount Lemmon	Mount Lemmon Survey	·	730 m	MPC · JPL
378033	2006 SQ_{391}	—	September 18, 2006	Kitt Peak	Spacewatch	·	610 m	MPC · JPL
378034	2006 SH_{392}	—	September 25, 2006	Mount Lemmon	Mount Lemmon Survey	·	870 m	MPC · JPL
378035	2006 SE_{394}	—	September 30, 2006	Mount Lemmon	Mount Lemmon Survey	·	1.1 km	MPC · JPL
378036	2006 SD_{398}	—	September 28, 2006	Mount Lemmon	Mount Lemmon Survey	·	970 m	MPC · JPL
378037	2006 SE_{401}	—	September 27, 2006	Mount Lemmon	Mount Lemmon Survey	·	680 m	MPC · JPL
378038	2006 SM_{402}	—	September 25, 2006	Kitt Peak	Spacewatch	·	570 m	MPC · JPL
378039	2006 SP_{405}	—	September 16, 2006	Kitt Peak	Spacewatch	·	640 m	MPC · JPL
378040	2006 SY_{410}	—	September 20, 2006	Kitt Peak	Spacewatch	V	510 m	MPC · JPL
378041	2006 SX_{411}	—	September 28, 2006	Catalina	CSS	·	990 m	MPC · JPL
378042	2006 TN_{12}	—	December 22, 2003	Kitt Peak	Spacewatch	·	730 m	MPC · JPL
378043	2006 TX_{20}	—	October 11, 2006	Kitt Peak	Spacewatch	·	630 m	MPC · JPL
378044	2006 TT_{22}	—	October 11, 2006	Kitt Peak	Spacewatch	·	690 m	MPC · JPL
378045	2006 TR_{23}	—	October 11, 2006	Kitt Peak	Spacewatch	·	980 m	MPC · JPL
378046	2006 TX_{23}	—	September 30, 2006	Mount Lemmon	Mount Lemmon Survey	·	690 m	MPC · JPL
378047	2006 TH_{32}	—	October 12, 2006	Kitt Peak	Spacewatch	·	540 m	MPC · JPL
378048	2006 TD_{33}	—	October 12, 2006	Kitt Peak	Spacewatch	·	1.1 km	MPC · JPL
378049	2006 TM_{34}	—	October 12, 2006	Kitt Peak	Spacewatch	·	670 m	MPC · JPL
378050	2006 TJ_{39}	—	October 12, 2006	Kitt Peak	Spacewatch	SYL · CYB	3.8 km	MPC · JPL
378051	2006 TY_{46}	—	October 12, 2006	Kitt Peak	Spacewatch	·	660 m	MPC · JPL
378052	2006 TA_{51}	—	October 12, 2006	Kitt Peak	Spacewatch	·	860 m	MPC · JPL
378053	2006 TC_{60}	—	October 13, 2006	Kitt Peak	Spacewatch	·	980 m	MPC · JPL
378054	2006 TF_{60}	—	October 13, 2006	Kitt Peak	Spacewatch	·	600 m	MPC · JPL
378055	2006 TN_{64}	—	October 11, 2006	Kitt Peak	Spacewatch	V	660 m	MPC · JPL
378056	2006 TM_{74}	—	October 11, 2006	Palomar	NEAT	·	760 m	MPC · JPL
378057	2006 TW_{83}	—	October 4, 2006	Mount Lemmon	Mount Lemmon Survey	·	890 m	MPC · JPL
378058	2006 TY_{84}	—	October 4, 2006	Mount Lemmon	Mount Lemmon Survey	·	880 m	MPC · JPL
378059	2006 TL_{86}	—	October 13, 2006	Kitt Peak	Spacewatch	·	720 m	MPC · JPL
378060	2006 TE_{91}	—	October 13, 2006	Kitt Peak	Spacewatch	·	1.1 km	MPC · JPL
378061	2006 TZ_{91}	—	October 13, 2006	Kitt Peak	Spacewatch	·	740 m	MPC · JPL
378062	2006 TH_{93}	—	October 2, 2006	Mount Lemmon	Mount Lemmon Survey	V	690 m	MPC · JPL
378063	2006 TL_{98}	—	October 15, 2006	Kitt Peak	Spacewatch	PHO	1.2 km	MPC · JPL
378064	2006 TU_{99}	—	October 15, 2006	Kitt Peak	Spacewatch	·	850 m	MPC · JPL
378065	2006 TL_{125}	—	October 13, 2006	Kitt Peak	Spacewatch	(2076)	890 m	MPC · JPL
378066	2006 TN_{129}	—	October 2, 2006	Catalina	CSS	·	1.1 km	MPC · JPL
378067	2006 UD_{6}	—	October 3, 2006	Mount Lemmon	Mount Lemmon Survey	·	750 m	MPC · JPL
378068	2006 UP_{13}	—	October 17, 2006	Mount Lemmon	Mount Lemmon Survey	·	720 m	MPC · JPL
378069	2006 UT_{14}	—	October 17, 2006	Mount Lemmon	Mount Lemmon Survey	·	810 m	MPC · JPL
378070	2006 US_{23}	—	October 16, 2006	Kitt Peak	Spacewatch	PHO	1.3 km	MPC · JPL
378071	2006 UB_{31}	—	October 16, 2006	Kitt Peak	Spacewatch	·	790 m	MPC · JPL
378072	2006 UY_{51}	—	October 17, 2006	Kitt Peak	Spacewatch	·	1.1 km	MPC · JPL
378073	2006 UB_{53}	—	October 17, 2006	Mount Lemmon	Mount Lemmon Survey	·	840 m	MPC · JPL
378074	2006 UK_{54}	—	October 17, 2006	Catalina	CSS	·	830 m	MPC · JPL
378075	2006 UJ_{62}	—	October 17, 2006	Mount Lemmon	Mount Lemmon Survey	·	840 m	MPC · JPL
378076 Campani	2006 UQ_{64}	Campani	October 23, 2006	Vallemare Borbona	V. S. Casulli	·	950 m	MPC · JPL
378077	2006 UE_{67}	—	October 16, 2006	Mount Lemmon	Mount Lemmon Survey	·	760 m	MPC · JPL
378078	2006 UQ_{69}	—	October 3, 2006	Mount Lemmon	Mount Lemmon Survey	·	840 m	MPC · JPL
378079	2006 US_{69}	—	October 16, 2006	Catalina	CSS	·	860 m	MPC · JPL
378080	2006 UW_{71}	—	October 17, 2006	Kitt Peak	Spacewatch	·	920 m	MPC · JPL
378081	2006 UY_{72}	—	October 17, 2006	Kitt Peak	Spacewatch	·	730 m	MPC · JPL
378082	2006 UW_{82}	—	October 2, 2006	Mount Lemmon	Mount Lemmon Survey	·	760 m	MPC · JPL
378083	2006 UH_{85}	—	October 17, 2006	Kitt Peak	Spacewatch	·	770 m	MPC · JPL
378084	2006 UM_{87}	—	October 17, 2006	Mount Lemmon	Mount Lemmon Survey	PHO	1.0 km	MPC · JPL
378085	2006 UT_{88}	—	October 17, 2006	Kitt Peak	Spacewatch	·	820 m	MPC · JPL
378086	2006 UB_{89}	—	October 17, 2006	Kitt Peak	Spacewatch	·	950 m	MPC · JPL
378087	2006 UG_{90}	—	October 17, 2006	Kitt Peak	Spacewatch	V	560 m	MPC · JPL
378088	2006 UM_{92}	—	October 18, 2006	Kitt Peak	Spacewatch	·	820 m	MPC · JPL
378089	2006 UY_{93}	—	October 18, 2006	Kitt Peak	Spacewatch	NYS	600 m	MPC · JPL
378090	2006 UD_{96}	—	October 18, 2006	Kitt Peak	Spacewatch	·	840 m	MPC · JPL
378091	2006 UD_{107}	—	October 18, 2006	Kitt Peak	Spacewatch	·	920 m	MPC · JPL
378092	2006 UY_{108}	—	October 18, 2006	Kitt Peak	Spacewatch	·	800 m	MPC · JPL
378093	2006 UH_{111}	—	August 29, 2006	Anderson Mesa	LONEOS	·	850 m	MPC · JPL
378094	2006 UF_{134}	—	October 3, 2006	Mount Lemmon	Mount Lemmon Survey	·	630 m	MPC · JPL
378095	2006 UP_{142}	—	October 19, 2006	Kitt Peak	Spacewatch	·	800 m	MPC · JPL
378096	2006 UY_{147}	—	September 18, 2006	Kitt Peak	Spacewatch	·	710 m	MPC · JPL
378097	2006 UJ_{156}	—	October 21, 2006	Mount Lemmon	Mount Lemmon Survey	·	650 m	MPC · JPL
378098	2006 UV_{169}	—	October 21, 2006	Mount Lemmon	Mount Lemmon Survey	·	820 m	MPC · JPL
378099	2006 UF_{170}	—	October 3, 2006	Mount Lemmon	Mount Lemmon Survey	·	640 m	MPC · JPL
378100	2006 UZ_{171}	—	October 21, 2006	Mount Lemmon	Mount Lemmon Survey	·	990 m	MPC · JPL

== 378101–378200 ==
back to top

Designation			Discovery			Properties		Ref
Permanent	Provisional	Named after	Date	Site	Discoverer(s)	Category	Diam.	Ref
378101	2006 UG_{173}	—	October 2, 2006	Mount Lemmon	Mount Lemmon Survey	·	710 m	MPC · JPL
378102	2006 UR_{184}	—	September 28, 2006	Catalina	CSS	·	860 m	MPC · JPL
378103	2006 UG_{200}	—	October 21, 2006	Kitt Peak	Spacewatch	·	780 m	MPC · JPL
378104	2006 UR_{210}	—	October 23, 2006	Kitt Peak	Spacewatch	V	690 m	MPC · JPL
378105	2006 UD_{218}	—	September 28, 2006	Mount Lemmon	Mount Lemmon Survey	·	730 m	MPC · JPL
378106	2006 UG_{219}	—	September 26, 2006	Catalina	CSS	·	820 m	MPC · JPL
378107	2006 UH_{219}	—	October 16, 2006	Catalina	CSS	·	830 m	MPC · JPL
378108	2006 UO_{223}	—	October 19, 2006	Mount Lemmon	Mount Lemmon Survey	CYB	6.2 km	MPC · JPL
378109	2006 UU_{224}	—	October 19, 2006	Catalina	CSS	(2076)	940 m	MPC · JPL
378110	2006 UK_{236}	—	October 23, 2006	Kitt Peak	Spacewatch	(2076)	780 m	MPC · JPL
378111	2006 UQ_{237}	—	October 23, 2006	Kitt Peak	Spacewatch	·	660 m	MPC · JPL
378112	2006 UG_{239}	—	October 23, 2006	Kitt Peak	Spacewatch	V	690 m	MPC · JPL
378113	2006 UM_{244}	—	October 27, 2006	Mount Lemmon	Mount Lemmon Survey	·	810 m	MPC · JPL
378114	2006 UW_{253}	—	October 27, 2006	Mount Lemmon	Mount Lemmon Survey	·	530 m	MPC · JPL
378115	2006 UV_{257}	—	October 28, 2006	Mount Lemmon	Mount Lemmon Survey	·	790 m	MPC · JPL
378116	2006 UC_{259}	—	October 28, 2006	Mount Lemmon	Mount Lemmon Survey	·	810 m	MPC · JPL
378117	2006 UH_{280}	—	October 28, 2006	Mount Lemmon	Mount Lemmon Survey	·	600 m	MPC · JPL
378118	2006 UK_{280}	—	September 30, 2006	Mount Lemmon	Mount Lemmon Survey	PHO	890 m	MPC · JPL
378119	2006 UW_{319}	—	October 19, 2006	Kitt Peak	M. W. Buie	·	1.0 km	MPC · JPL
378120	2006 UC_{328}	—	October 16, 2006	Kitt Peak	Spacewatch	·	630 m	MPC · JPL
378121	2006 UU_{329}	—	October 29, 2006	Mount Lemmon	Mount Lemmon Survey	·	1.4 km	MPC · JPL
378122	2006 UC_{335}	—	October 16, 2006	Catalina	CSS	·	770 m	MPC · JPL
378123	2006 UK_{338}	—	October 28, 2006	Mount Lemmon	Mount Lemmon Survey	·	680 m	MPC · JPL
378124	2006 VT_{2}	—	November 11, 2006	Kitt Peak	Spacewatch	APO +1km	800 m	MPC · JPL
378125	2006 VO_{7}	—	September 30, 2006	Mount Lemmon	Mount Lemmon Survey	·	1.0 km	MPC · JPL
378126	2006 VO_{9}	—	September 30, 2006	Mount Lemmon	Mount Lemmon Survey	·	1.0 km	MPC · JPL
378127	2006 VH_{10}	—	November 11, 2006	Mount Lemmon	Mount Lemmon Survey	·	880 m	MPC · JPL
378128	2006 VA_{16}	—	November 9, 2006	Kitt Peak	Spacewatch	·	1.5 km	MPC · JPL
378129	2006 VB_{16}	—	September 27, 2006	Mount Lemmon	Mount Lemmon Survey	·	700 m	MPC · JPL
378130	2006 VJ_{17}	—	November 9, 2006	Kitt Peak	Spacewatch	MAS	770 m	MPC · JPL
378131	2006 VZ_{20}	—	November 9, 2006	Kitt Peak	Spacewatch	·	950 m	MPC · JPL
378132	2006 VR_{25}	—	November 10, 2006	Kitt Peak	Spacewatch	NYS	820 m	MPC · JPL
378133	2006 VV_{29}	—	November 10, 2006	Kitt Peak	Spacewatch	V	840 m	MPC · JPL
378134	2006 VK_{35}	—	November 11, 2006	Mount Lemmon	Mount Lemmon Survey	·	910 m	MPC · JPL
378135	2006 VE_{36}	—	September 30, 2006	Mount Lemmon	Mount Lemmon Survey	(2076)	810 m	MPC · JPL
378136	2006 VX_{41}	—	September 30, 2006	Mount Lemmon	Mount Lemmon Survey	·	1.6 km	MPC · JPL
378137	2006 VS_{44}	—	November 12, 2006	Mount Lemmon	Mount Lemmon Survey	MAS	880 m	MPC · JPL
378138	2006 VW_{45}	—	October 19, 2006	Mount Lemmon	Mount Lemmon Survey	·	980 m	MPC · JPL
378139	2006 VW_{46}	—	November 9, 2006	Kitt Peak	Spacewatch	NYS	1.2 km	MPC · JPL
378140	2006 VF_{60}	—	November 11, 2006	Kitt Peak	Spacewatch	V	650 m	MPC · JPL
378141	2006 VP_{67}	—	November 11, 2006	Kitt Peak	Spacewatch	·	840 m	MPC · JPL
378142	2006 VR_{78}	—	November 12, 2006	Mount Lemmon	Mount Lemmon Survey	·	1.0 km	MPC · JPL
378143	2006 VT_{78}	—	November 12, 2006	Mount Lemmon	Mount Lemmon Survey	·	660 m	MPC · JPL
378144	2006 VG_{79}	—	November 12, 2006	Mount Lemmon	Mount Lemmon Survey	·	810 m	MPC · JPL
378145	2006 VP_{83}	—	October 13, 2006	Kitt Peak	Spacewatch	·	1.3 km	MPC · JPL
378146	2006 VZ_{89}	—	November 14, 2006	Kitt Peak	Spacewatch	·	1.1 km	MPC · JPL
378147	2006 VW_{90}	—	October 23, 2006	Kitt Peak	Spacewatch	·	870 m	MPC · JPL
378148	2006 VF_{107}	—	September 27, 2006	Mount Lemmon	Mount Lemmon Survey	·	890 m	MPC · JPL
378149	2006 VR_{113}	—	September 28, 2006	Mount Lemmon	Mount Lemmon Survey	·	1.1 km	MPC · JPL
378150	2006 VY_{114}	—	September 27, 2006	Mount Lemmon	Mount Lemmon Survey	MAR	1.1 km	MPC · JPL
378151	2006 VS_{115}	—	November 14, 2006	Kitt Peak	Spacewatch	·	750 m	MPC · JPL
378152	2006 VQ_{117}	—	November 14, 2006	Kitt Peak	Spacewatch	·	670 m	MPC · JPL
378153	2006 VK_{140}	—	November 15, 2006	Kitt Peak	Spacewatch	·	850 m	MPC · JPL
378154	2006 VT_{140}	—	November 15, 2006	Kitt Peak	Spacewatch	·	1.3 km	MPC · JPL
378155	2006 VU_{140}	—	November 15, 2006	Kitt Peak	Spacewatch	MAS	700 m	MPC · JPL
378156	2006 VV_{146}	—	November 15, 2006	Mount Lemmon	Mount Lemmon Survey	(2076)	610 m	MPC · JPL
378157	2006 VQ_{150}	—	November 9, 2006	Palomar	NEAT	·	910 m	MPC · JPL
378158	2006 VM_{153}	—	November 8, 2006	Palomar	NEAT	V	880 m	MPC · JPL
378159	2006 VB_{170}	—	November 11, 2006	Mount Lemmon	Mount Lemmon Survey	·	1.1 km	MPC · JPL
378160	2006 WX_{1}	—	November 19, 2006	Catalina	CSS	ATE · PHA	410 m	MPC · JPL
378161	2006 WK_{4}	—	November 18, 2006	Socorro	LINEAR	·	1.5 km	MPC · JPL
378162	2006 WQ_{7}	—	November 16, 2006	Kitt Peak	Spacewatch	PHO	940 m	MPC · JPL
378163	2006 WC_{8}	—	November 16, 2006	Socorro	LINEAR	PHO	1.0 km	MPC · JPL
378164	2006 WT_{39}	—	November 16, 2006	Kitt Peak	Spacewatch	V	820 m	MPC · JPL
378165	2006 WC_{43}	—	November 16, 2006	Mount Lemmon	Mount Lemmon Survey	·	780 m	MPC · JPL
378166	2006 WV_{45}	—	November 16, 2006	Mount Lemmon	Mount Lemmon Survey	·	750 m	MPC · JPL
378167	2006 WR_{51}	—	November 16, 2006	Kitt Peak	Spacewatch	·	1.1 km	MPC · JPL
378168	2006 WC_{60}	—	October 23, 2006	Mount Lemmon	Mount Lemmon Survey	·	950 m	MPC · JPL
378169	2006 WF_{75}	—	November 18, 2006	Kitt Peak	Spacewatch	·	990 m	MPC · JPL
378170	2006 WF_{79}	—	November 18, 2006	Kitt Peak	Spacewatch	·	770 m	MPC · JPL
378171	2006 WY_{79}	—	November 18, 2006	Kitt Peak	Spacewatch	NYS	950 m	MPC · JPL
378172	2006 WV_{96}	—	October 19, 2006	Mount Lemmon	Mount Lemmon Survey	·	1.5 km	MPC · JPL
378173	2006 WN_{106}	—	November 19, 2006	Kitt Peak	Spacewatch	·	890 m	MPC · JPL
378174	2006 WF_{110}	—	November 19, 2006	Kitt Peak	Spacewatch	·	860 m	MPC · JPL
378175	2006 WA_{129}	—	November 23, 2006	Mount Lemmon	Mount Lemmon Survey	·	1.1 km	MPC · JPL
378176	2006 WB_{162}	—	November 23, 2006	Kitt Peak	Spacewatch	V	540 m	MPC · JPL
378177	2006 WY_{167}	—	November 23, 2006	Kitt Peak	Spacewatch	NYS	800 m	MPC · JPL
378178	2006 WG_{171}	—	November 23, 2006	Kitt Peak	Spacewatch	·	830 m	MPC · JPL
378179	2006 WL_{182}	—	November 24, 2006	Mount Lemmon	Mount Lemmon Survey	NYS	800 m	MPC · JPL
378180	2006 WY_{183}	—	November 25, 2006	Mount Lemmon	Mount Lemmon Survey	·	1.1 km	MPC · JPL
378181	2006 WG_{198}	—	November 27, 2006	Mount Lemmon	Mount Lemmon Survey	NYS	1.1 km	MPC · JPL
378182	2006 WU_{202}	—	November 27, 2006	Mount Lemmon	Mount Lemmon Survey	·	2.2 km	MPC · JPL
378183	2006 XK_{7}	—	December 9, 2006	Kitt Peak	Spacewatch	·	980 m	MPC · JPL
378184	2006 XD_{10}	—	November 18, 2006	Kitt Peak	Spacewatch	NYS	1.1 km	MPC · JPL
378185	2006 XF_{11}	—	December 10, 2006	Kitt Peak	Spacewatch	V	620 m	MPC · JPL
378186	2006 XZ_{16}	—	December 10, 2006	Kitt Peak	Spacewatch	HIL · 3:2	6.2 km	MPC · JPL
378187	2006 XG_{17}	—	December 10, 2006	Kitt Peak	Spacewatch	V	770 m	MPC · JPL
378188	2006 XA_{23}	—	November 19, 2006	Kitt Peak	Spacewatch	·	950 m	MPC · JPL
378189	2006 XD_{29}	—	December 13, 2006	Mount Lemmon	Mount Lemmon Survey	·	1.0 km	MPC · JPL
378190	2006 XO_{33}	—	December 11, 2006	Kitt Peak	Spacewatch	NYS	990 m	MPC · JPL
378191	2006 XP_{33}	—	December 11, 2006	Kitt Peak	Spacewatch	·	920 m	MPC · JPL
378192	2006 XH_{43}	—	December 12, 2006	Mount Lemmon	Mount Lemmon Survey	NYS	1.2 km	MPC · JPL
378193	2006 XF_{45}	—	December 13, 2006	Kitt Peak	Spacewatch	MAS	610 m	MPC · JPL
378194	2006 XN_{53}	—	December 14, 2006	Catalina	CSS	·	1.5 km	MPC · JPL
378195	2006 XA_{55}	—	December 15, 2006	Socorro	LINEAR	·	1.2 km	MPC · JPL
378196	2006 XT_{58}	—	December 14, 2006	Kitt Peak	Spacewatch	·	930 m	MPC · JPL
378197	2006 XG_{70}	—	December 13, 2006	Kitt Peak	Spacewatch	·	1.5 km	MPC · JPL
378198	2006 XJ_{70}	—	October 22, 2006	Mount Lemmon	Mount Lemmon Survey	·	1.2 km	MPC · JPL
378199	2006 YL_{21}	—	December 21, 2006	Kitt Peak	Spacewatch	V	820 m	MPC · JPL
378200	2006 YL_{26}	—	December 10, 2006	Kitt Peak	Spacewatch	·	1.7 km	MPC · JPL

== 378201–378300 ==
back to top

Designation			Discovery			Properties		Ref
Permanent	Provisional	Named after	Date	Site	Discoverer(s)	Category	Diam.	Ref
378201	2006 YY_{29}	—	December 21, 2006	Kitt Peak	Spacewatch	V	840 m	MPC · JPL
378202	2006 YV_{36}	—	November 22, 2006	Mount Lemmon	Mount Lemmon Survey	NYS	1.2 km	MPC · JPL
378203	2006 YW_{42}	—	December 23, 2006	Mount Lemmon	Mount Lemmon Survey	·	960 m	MPC · JPL
378204 Bettyhesser	2006 YF_{49}	Bettyhesser	December 26, 2006	Mauna Kea	D. D. Balam	·	1.4 km	MPC · JPL
378205	2006 YP_{49}	—	December 28, 2006	Pla D'Arguines	R. Ferrando	·	970 m	MPC · JPL
378206	2006 YQ_{55}	—	December 24, 2006	Mount Lemmon	Mount Lemmon Survey	·	2.5 km	MPC · JPL
378207	2007 AH_{1}	—	January 8, 2007	Mount Lemmon	Mount Lemmon Survey	MAS	870 m	MPC · JPL
378208	2007 AK_{1}	—	January 8, 2007	Mount Lemmon	Mount Lemmon Survey	·	1.7 km	MPC · JPL
378209	2007 AA_{4}	—	January 8, 2007	Catalina	CSS	·	1.2 km	MPC · JPL
378210	2007 AR_{8}	—	November 27, 2006	Mount Lemmon	Mount Lemmon Survey	·	1.5 km	MPC · JPL
378211	2007 AK_{9}	—	January 13, 2007	Pla D'Arguines	R. Ferrando	·	1.1 km	MPC · JPL
378212	2007 AO_{9}	—	January 8, 2007	Kitt Peak	Spacewatch	·	1.4 km	MPC · JPL
378213	2007 AF_{11}	—	January 10, 2007	Mount Lemmon	Mount Lemmon Survey	·	1.5 km	MPC · JPL
378214 Sauron	2007 AP_{11}	Sauron	January 14, 2007	Taunus	E. Schwab, R. Kling	·	1.2 km	MPC · JPL
378215	2007 AZ_{12}	—	January 9, 2007	Mount Lemmon	Mount Lemmon Survey	·	1.0 km	MPC · JPL
378216	2007 AZ_{18}	—	July 16, 2001	Socorro	LINEAR	PHO	2.0 km	MPC · JPL
378217	2007 AB_{25}	—	December 24, 2006	Kitt Peak	Spacewatch	·	2.0 km	MPC · JPL
378218	2007 BD_{12}	—	January 17, 2007	Kitt Peak	Spacewatch	·	1.5 km	MPC · JPL
378219	2007 BY_{16}	—	January 17, 2007	Palomar	NEAT	MAS	890 m	MPC · JPL
378220	2007 BD_{17}	—	December 21, 2006	Kitt Peak	Spacewatch	·	1.9 km	MPC · JPL
378221	2007 BO_{17}	—	January 17, 2007	Palomar	NEAT	·	1.2 km	MPC · JPL
378222	2007 BW_{18}	—	December 9, 2002	Kitt Peak	Spacewatch	V	940 m	MPC · JPL
378223	2007 BJ_{21}	—	January 24, 2007	Socorro	LINEAR	NYS	1.1 km	MPC · JPL
378224	2007 BW_{21}	—	January 24, 2007	Socorro	LINEAR	·	1.3 km	MPC · JPL
378225	2007 BD_{27}	—	January 24, 2007	Catalina	CSS	·	980 m	MPC · JPL
378226	2007 BK_{27}	—	December 27, 2006	Mount Lemmon	Mount Lemmon Survey	NYS	1.1 km	MPC · JPL
378227	2007 BT_{29}	—	January 24, 2007	Socorro	LINEAR	·	1.0 km	MPC · JPL
378228	2007 BD_{39}	—	January 24, 2007	Catalina	CSS	·	1.4 km	MPC · JPL
378229	2007 BO_{55}	—	January 24, 2007	Socorro	LINEAR	NYS	950 m	MPC · JPL
378230	2007 BY_{64}	—	January 27, 2007	Mount Lemmon	Mount Lemmon Survey	·	1.2 km	MPC · JPL
378231	2007 BF_{74}	—	January 17, 2007	Palomar	NEAT	·	1.3 km	MPC · JPL
378232	2007 BO_{77}	—	January 17, 2007	Kitt Peak	Spacewatch	·	1.0 km	MPC · JPL
378233	2007 BJ_{78}	—	January 24, 2007	Catalina	CSS	NYS	1.2 km	MPC · JPL
378234	2007 BJ_{81}	—	January 27, 2007	Kitt Peak	Spacewatch	·	1.9 km	MPC · JPL
378235	2007 BO_{96}	—	January 19, 2007	Mauna Kea	Mauna Kea	·	1.2 km	MPC · JPL
378236	2007 BD_{101}	—	January 27, 2007	Kitt Peak	Spacewatch	·	1.3 km	MPC · JPL
378237	2007 CF	—	January 10, 2007	Mount Lemmon	Mount Lemmon Survey	·	1.2 km	MPC · JPL
378238	2007 CB_{1}	—	January 10, 2007	Mount Lemmon	Mount Lemmon Survey	·	1.1 km	MPC · JPL
378239	2007 CJ_{5}	—	January 17, 2007	Mount Lemmon	Mount Lemmon Survey	·	1.2 km	MPC · JPL
378240	2007 CJ_{7}	—	November 27, 2006	Mount Lemmon	Mount Lemmon Survey	·	1.0 km	MPC · JPL
378241	2007 CY_{10}	—	February 6, 2007	Mount Lemmon	Mount Lemmon Survey	NYS	950 m	MPC · JPL
378242	2007 CR_{12}	—	February 6, 2007	Mount Lemmon	Mount Lemmon Survey	NYS	1.2 km	MPC · JPL
378243	2007 CU_{22}	—	February 6, 2007	Mount Lemmon	Mount Lemmon Survey	·	1.3 km	MPC · JPL
378244	2007 CN_{36}	—	February 6, 2007	Mount Lemmon	Mount Lemmon Survey	MAS	690 m	MPC · JPL
378245	2007 CZ_{40}	—	February 7, 2007	Kitt Peak	Spacewatch	·	1.4 km	MPC · JPL
378246	2007 CD_{44}	—	January 17, 2007	Kitt Peak	Spacewatch	NYS	1.1 km	MPC · JPL
378247	2007 CK_{61}	—	February 15, 2007	Catalina	CSS	·	1.4 km	MPC · JPL
378248	2007 CX_{63}	—	December 27, 2006	Mount Lemmon	Mount Lemmon Survey	·	2.1 km	MPC · JPL
378249	2007 DK_{4}	—	February 16, 2007	Mount Lemmon	Mount Lemmon Survey	·	1.1 km	MPC · JPL
378250	2007 DW_{9}	—	February 17, 2007	Palomar	NEAT	PHO	1.1 km	MPC · JPL
378251	2007 DN_{10}	—	February 17, 2007	Kitt Peak	Spacewatch	L5	8.6 km	MPC · JPL
378252	2007 DP_{18}	—	February 17, 2007	Kitt Peak	Spacewatch	·	2.3 km	MPC · JPL
378253	2007 DT_{19}	—	February 17, 2007	Kitt Peak	Spacewatch	·	2.4 km	MPC · JPL
378254	2007 DD_{20}	—	February 17, 2007	Kitt Peak	Spacewatch	·	1.1 km	MPC · JPL
378255	2007 DP_{35}	—	February 17, 2007	Kitt Peak	Spacewatch	·	2.3 km	MPC · JPL
378256	2007 DO_{37}	—	February 17, 2007	Kitt Peak	Spacewatch	·	1.1 km	MPC · JPL
378257	2007 DS_{48}	—	February 21, 2007	Mount Lemmon	Mount Lemmon Survey	·	4.4 km	MPC · JPL
378258	2007 DW_{51}	—	October 25, 2005	Mount Lemmon	Mount Lemmon Survey	·	990 m	MPC · JPL
378259	2007 DO_{69}	—	February 21, 2007	Kitt Peak	Spacewatch	·	2.1 km	MPC · JPL
378260	2007 DN_{73}	—	February 21, 2007	Kitt Peak	Spacewatch	·	1.0 km	MPC · JPL
378261	2007 DD_{78}	—	February 23, 2007	Catalina	CSS	·	1.9 km	MPC · JPL
378262	2007 DH_{101}	—	February 26, 2007	Mount Lemmon	Mount Lemmon Survey	·	1.1 km	MPC · JPL
378263	2007 DC_{103}	—	February 21, 2007	Kitt Peak	M. W. Buie	·	1.1 km	MPC · JPL
378264	2007 DX_{111}	—	February 25, 2007	Kitt Peak	Spacewatch	MAS	740 m	MPC · JPL
378265	2007 ES_{8}	—	February 16, 2007	Mount Lemmon	Mount Lemmon Survey	·	1.8 km	MPC · JPL
378266	2007 ED_{10}	—	March 10, 2007	Wrightwood	J. W. Young	·	1.1 km	MPC · JPL
378267	2007 EE_{10}	—	March 10, 2007	Saint-Sulpice	B. Christophe	·	1.1 km	MPC · JPL
378268	2007 EM_{12}	—	March 9, 2007	Palomar	NEAT	·	1.6 km	MPC · JPL
378269	2007 ER_{14}	—	March 9, 2007	Mount Lemmon	Mount Lemmon Survey	MAS	680 m	MPC · JPL
378270	2007 EA_{22}	—	March 10, 2007	Kitt Peak	Spacewatch	·	1.2 km	MPC · JPL
378271	2007 ER_{30}	—	March 10, 2007	Kitt Peak	Spacewatch	·	950 m	MPC · JPL
378272	2007 EJ_{40}	—	March 12, 2007	Bergisch Gladbach	W. Bickel	MRX	1.2 km	MPC · JPL
378273	2007 EB_{51}	—	March 10, 2007	Kitt Peak	Spacewatch	L5	8.7 km	MPC · JPL
378274	2007 EB_{53}	—	February 17, 2007	Catalina	CSS	H	560 m	MPC · JPL
378275	2007 ET_{54}	—	February 22, 2007	Kitt Peak	Spacewatch	L5	8.8 km	MPC · JPL
378276	2007 EO_{69}	—	March 10, 2007	Kitt Peak	Spacewatch	·	1.3 km	MPC · JPL
378277	2007 EU_{69}	—	March 10, 2007	Kitt Peak	Spacewatch	·	2.7 km	MPC · JPL
378278	2007 EE_{70}	—	March 10, 2007	Kitt Peak	Spacewatch	·	1.1 km	MPC · JPL
378279	2007 EH_{86}	—	March 12, 2007	Kitt Peak	Spacewatch	H	590 m	MPC · JPL
378280	2007 EL_{89}	—	March 9, 2007	Kitt Peak	Spacewatch	·	950 m	MPC · JPL
378281	2007 EM_{89}	—	March 9, 2007	Kitt Peak	Spacewatch	·	1.7 km	MPC · JPL
378282	2007 EA_{96}	—	March 9, 2007	Catalina	CSS	H	490 m	MPC · JPL
378283	2007 EW_{116}	—	March 13, 2007	Mount Lemmon	Mount Lemmon Survey	·	2.1 km	MPC · JPL
378284	2007 ES_{118}	—	March 13, 2007	Mount Lemmon	Mount Lemmon Survey	·	2.6 km	MPC · JPL
378285	2007 EQ_{119}	—	March 13, 2007	Mount Lemmon	Mount Lemmon Survey	·	1.6 km	MPC · JPL
378286	2007 EM_{129}	—	April 30, 2003	Kitt Peak	Spacewatch	·	2.2 km	MPC · JPL
378287	2007 EF_{131}	—	March 9, 2007	Mount Lemmon	Mount Lemmon Survey	·	990 m	MPC · JPL
378288	2007 EX_{132}	—	March 9, 2007	Mount Lemmon	Mount Lemmon Survey	·	1.7 km	MPC · JPL
378289	2007 EH_{134}	—	March 9, 2007	Mount Lemmon	Mount Lemmon Survey	·	1.2 km	MPC · JPL
378290	2007 EF_{136}	—	March 10, 2007	Mount Lemmon	Mount Lemmon Survey	·	2.8 km	MPC · JPL
378291	2007 ER_{146}	—	February 26, 2007	Mount Lemmon	Mount Lemmon Survey	·	1.2 km	MPC · JPL
378292	2007 EP_{150}	—	March 12, 2007	Mount Lemmon	Mount Lemmon Survey	·	1.2 km	MPC · JPL
378293	2007 EW_{153}	—	March 12, 2007	Mount Lemmon	Mount Lemmon Survey	·	1.6 km	MPC · JPL
378294	2007 EO_{157}	—	March 13, 2007	Mount Lemmon	Mount Lemmon Survey	·	1.0 km	MPC · JPL
378295	2007 EP_{157}	—	March 13, 2007	Mount Lemmon	Mount Lemmon Survey	NYS	1.2 km	MPC · JPL
378296	2007 EC_{158}	—	March 13, 2007	Kitt Peak	Spacewatch	·	1.3 km	MPC · JPL
378297	2007 EL_{176}	—	March 14, 2007	Kitt Peak	Spacewatch	·	1.3 km	MPC · JPL
378298	2007 ES_{178}	—	March 14, 2007	Kitt Peak	Spacewatch	HNS	1.3 km	MPC · JPL
378299	2007 EX_{180}	—	March 14, 2007	Kitt Peak	Spacewatch	JUN	1.5 km	MPC · JPL
378300	2007 EG_{191}	—	March 13, 2007	Kitt Peak	Spacewatch	·	2.2 km	MPC · JPL

== 378301–378400 ==
back to top

Designation			Discovery			Properties		Ref
Permanent	Provisional	Named after	Date	Site	Discoverer(s)	Category	Diam.	Ref
378301	2007 EH_{200}	—	March 12, 2007	Catalina	CSS	ADE	1.9 km	MPC · JPL
378302	2007 EE_{212}	—	March 8, 2007	Palomar	NEAT	·	1.5 km	MPC · JPL
378303	2007 EP_{214}	—	March 11, 2007	Mount Lemmon	Mount Lemmon Survey	·	2.1 km	MPC · JPL
378304	2007 EN_{217}	—	March 11, 2007	Mount Lemmon	Mount Lemmon Survey	L5	8.7 km	MPC · JPL
378305	2007 FC_{1}	—	March 18, 2007	Catalina	CSS	·	630 m	MPC · JPL
378306	2007 FB_{11}	—	March 16, 2007	Kitt Peak	Spacewatch	JUN	1.2 km	MPC · JPL
378307	2007 FO_{12}	—	March 18, 2007	Kitt Peak	Spacewatch	·	1.0 km	MPC · JPL
378308	2007 FD_{14}	—	March 19, 2007	Mount Lemmon	Mount Lemmon Survey	·	2.6 km	MPC · JPL
378309	2007 FK_{21}	—	March 20, 2007	Mount Lemmon	Mount Lemmon Survey	·	1.1 km	MPC · JPL
378310	2007 FB_{27}	—	March 20, 2007	Kitt Peak	Spacewatch	·	1.3 km	MPC · JPL
378311	2007 FR_{36}	—	March 26, 2007	Kitt Peak	Spacewatch	·	2.7 km	MPC · JPL
378312	2007 FY_{43}	—	March 16, 2007	Mount Lemmon	Mount Lemmon Survey	(5)	1.8 km	MPC · JPL
378313	2007 FF_{45}	—	March 20, 2007	Mount Lemmon	Mount Lemmon Survey	·	1.7 km	MPC · JPL
378314	2007 FV_{46}	—	March 18, 2007	Kitt Peak	Spacewatch	·	3.4 km	MPC · JPL
378315	2007 FL_{47}	—	March 26, 2007	Mount Lemmon	Mount Lemmon Survey	·	1.5 km	MPC · JPL
378316	2007 FM_{49}	—	March 20, 2007	Catalina	CSS	·	2.7 km	MPC · JPL
378317	2007 FA_{50}	—	March 25, 2007	Mount Lemmon	Mount Lemmon Survey	KON	3.4 km	MPC · JPL
378318	2007 GC_{4}	—	April 11, 2007	Catalina	CSS	·	2.7 km	MPC · JPL
378319	2007 GM_{5}	—	April 14, 2007	Bergisch Gladbach	W. Bickel	·	1.3 km	MPC · JPL
378320	2007 GR_{6}	—	March 17, 2007	Anderson Mesa	LONEOS	·	2.2 km	MPC · JPL
378321	2007 GC_{17}	—	April 11, 2007	Kitt Peak	Spacewatch	·	2.7 km	MPC · JPL
378322	2007 GX_{26}	—	April 14, 2007	Kitt Peak	Spacewatch	·	2.3 km	MPC · JPL
378323	2007 GS_{36}	—	April 14, 2007	Kitt Peak	Spacewatch	·	1.5 km	MPC · JPL
378324	2007 GO_{37}	—	April 14, 2007	Kitt Peak	Spacewatch	AGN	1.5 km	MPC · JPL
378325	2007 GT_{40}	—	April 14, 2007	Kitt Peak	Spacewatch	·	1.9 km	MPC · JPL
378326	2007 GH_{45}	—	April 14, 2007	Kitt Peak	Spacewatch	·	1.3 km	MPC · JPL
378327	2007 GA_{46}	—	April 14, 2007	Kitt Peak	Spacewatch	·	1.4 km	MPC · JPL
378328	2007 GQ_{55}	—	April 15, 2007	Kitt Peak	Spacewatch	·	1.8 km	MPC · JPL
378329	2007 GG_{56}	—	April 15, 2007	Kitt Peak	Spacewatch	·	1.8 km	MPC · JPL
378330	2007 GO_{64}	—	April 15, 2007	Kitt Peak	Spacewatch	AGN	1.2 km	MPC · JPL
378331	2007 GX_{64}	—	April 15, 2007	Kitt Peak	Spacewatch	·	2.6 km	MPC · JPL
378332	2007 GY_{75}	—	April 11, 2007	Mount Lemmon	Mount Lemmon Survey	L5	7.7 km	MPC · JPL
378333	2007 HW_{6}	—	March 18, 2007	Kitt Peak	Spacewatch	·	1.6 km	MPC · JPL
378334	2007 HM_{9}	—	April 18, 2007	Kitt Peak	Spacewatch	NEM	2.5 km	MPC · JPL
378335	2007 HS_{9}	—	March 26, 2007	Kitt Peak	Spacewatch	(7744)	1.6 km	MPC · JPL
378336	2007 HM_{13}	—	April 18, 2007	Catalina	CSS	·	1.2 km	MPC · JPL
378337	2007 HP_{31}	—	April 15, 2007	Kitt Peak	Spacewatch	KON	2.2 km	MPC · JPL
378338	2007 HX_{31}	—	April 19, 2007	Kitt Peak	Spacewatch	·	2.3 km	MPC · JPL
378339	2007 HB_{35}	—	April 19, 2007	Kitt Peak	Spacewatch	RAF	1.1 km	MPC · JPL
378340	2007 HV_{42}	—	April 22, 2007	Mount Lemmon	Mount Lemmon Survey	·	2.1 km	MPC · JPL
378341	2007 HV_{47}	—	April 20, 2007	Kitt Peak	Spacewatch	·	2.1 km	MPC · JPL
378342	2007 HP_{48}	—	April 20, 2007	Kitt Peak	Spacewatch	·	1.8 km	MPC · JPL
378343	2007 HR_{51}	—	November 19, 2004	Catalina	CSS	·	2.4 km	MPC · JPL
378344	2007 HS_{59}	—	April 18, 2007	Mount Lemmon	Mount Lemmon Survey	·	1.7 km	MPC · JPL
378345	2007 HQ_{63}	—	April 22, 2007	Mount Lemmon	Mount Lemmon Survey	·	2.6 km	MPC · JPL
378346	2007 HN_{69}	—	April 24, 2007	Mount Lemmon	Mount Lemmon Survey	·	2.4 km	MPC · JPL
378347	2007 HS_{80}	—	March 16, 2007	Kitt Peak	Spacewatch	·	2.0 km	MPC · JPL
378348	2007 HA_{83}	—	April 22, 2007	Kitt Peak	Spacewatch	·	3.0 km	MPC · JPL
378349	2007 HK_{87}	—	April 24, 2007	Kitt Peak	Spacewatch	·	2.3 km	MPC · JPL
378350	2007 HP_{87}	—	April 25, 2007	Kitt Peak	Spacewatch	·	2.0 km	MPC · JPL
378351	2007 HF_{97}	—	April 19, 2007	Mount Lemmon	Mount Lemmon Survey	·	3.4 km	MPC · JPL
378352	2007 JC_{9}	—	May 9, 2007	Mount Lemmon	Mount Lemmon Survey	·	3.0 km	MPC · JPL
378353	2007 JR_{21}	—	May 9, 2007	Mount Lemmon	Mount Lemmon Survey	·	2.4 km	MPC · JPL
378354	2007 JU_{23}	—	May 8, 2007	Lulin	LUSS	·	2.2 km	MPC · JPL
378355	2007 KG_{2}	—	May 18, 2007	Charleston	Astronomical Research Observatory	L5	10 km	MPC · JPL
378356	2007 KL_{2}	—	May 19, 2007	Tiki	S. F. Hönig, Teamo, N.	·	2.0 km	MPC · JPL
378357	2007 KS_{3}	—	May 23, 2007	Mount Lemmon	Mount Lemmon Survey	ADE	2.4 km	MPC · JPL
378358	2007 LD	—	June 7, 2007	Socorro	LINEAR	APO · PHA	480 m	MPC · JPL
378359	2007 LX_{2}	—	June 8, 2007	Kitt Peak	Spacewatch	H	610 m	MPC · JPL
378360	2007 LH_{7}	—	June 8, 2007	Kitt Peak	Spacewatch	·	1.4 km	MPC · JPL
378361	2007 LA_{14}	—	September 30, 2005	Catalina	CSS	H	580 m	MPC · JPL
378362	2007 LZ_{15}	—	June 10, 2007	Kitt Peak	Spacewatch	·	2.0 km	MPC · JPL
378363	2007 LK_{17}	—	June 10, 2007	Kitt Peak	Spacewatch	·	2.9 km	MPC · JPL
378364	2007 LU_{24}	—	June 14, 2007	Kitt Peak	Spacewatch	·	2.0 km	MPC · JPL
378365	2007 LL_{25}	—	June 14, 2007	Kitt Peak	Spacewatch	·	1.9 km	MPC · JPL
378366	2007 MR_{2}	—	June 16, 2007	Kitt Peak	Spacewatch	·	2.3 km	MPC · JPL
378367	2007 MB_{5}	—	June 17, 2007	Kitt Peak	Spacewatch	EUN	1.5 km	MPC · JPL
378368	2007 MR_{5}	—	November 19, 2003	Anderson Mesa	LONEOS	·	2.9 km	MPC · JPL
378369	2007 ME_{16}	—	June 20, 2007	Kitt Peak	Spacewatch	·	2.5 km	MPC · JPL
378370 Orton	2007 ON_{5}	Orton	July 24, 2007	Wrightwood	J. W. Young	·	3.5 km	MPC · JPL
378371	2007 PH_{13}	—	August 8, 2007	Socorro	LINEAR	·	3.3 km	MPC · JPL
378372	2007 PA_{14}	—	August 8, 2007	Socorro	LINEAR	·	3.0 km	MPC · JPL
378373	2007 PU_{14}	—	August 8, 2007	Socorro	LINEAR	slow	3.3 km	MPC · JPL
378374	2007 PP_{23}	—	June 9, 2007	Catalina	CSS	·	5.2 km	MPC · JPL
378375	2007 PZ_{23}	—	August 12, 2007	Socorro	LINEAR	·	3.9 km	MPC · JPL
378376	2007 PM_{25}	—	August 13, 2007	Socorro	LINEAR	TIR	3.7 km	MPC · JPL
378377	2007 PY_{29}	—	August 8, 2007	Socorro	LINEAR	·	5.0 km	MPC · JPL
378378	2007 PF_{34}	—	August 13, 2007	Socorro	LINEAR	·	2.8 km	MPC · JPL
378379	2007 QM	—	August 16, 2007	Socorro	LINEAR	T_{j} (2.95)	3.9 km	MPC · JPL
378380	2007 QN_{10}	—	August 23, 2007	Kitt Peak	Spacewatch	·	3.7 km	MPC · JPL
378381	2007 QG_{13}	—	August 21, 2007	Siding Spring	SSS	·	4.1 km	MPC · JPL
378382	2007 QB_{14}	—	August 24, 2007	Kitt Peak	Spacewatch	·	3.0 km	MPC · JPL
378383	2007 QN_{14}	—	August 23, 2007	Kitt Peak	Spacewatch	THM	2.2 km	MPC · JPL
378384	2007 QR_{14}	—	August 24, 2007	Kitt Peak	Spacewatch	THB	2.9 km	MPC · JPL
378385	2007 QB_{15}	—	August 24, 2007	Kitt Peak	Spacewatch	·	2.7 km	MPC · JPL
378386	2007 QH_{15}	—	August 23, 2007	Kitt Peak	Spacewatch	·	3.0 km	MPC · JPL
378387	2007 QR_{16}	—	August 21, 2007	Anderson Mesa	LONEOS	·	4.2 km	MPC · JPL
378388	2007 QW_{17}	—	August 24, 2007	Kitt Peak	Spacewatch	·	4.2 km	MPC · JPL
378389	2007 RL_{3}	—	September 3, 2007	Catalina	CSS	·	2.2 km	MPC · JPL
378390	2007 RX_{6}	—	March 8, 2005	Catalina	CSS	·	3.7 km	MPC · JPL
378391	2007 RX_{28}	—	September 4, 2007	Mount Lemmon	Mount Lemmon Survey	·	3.3 km	MPC · JPL
378392	2007 RP_{29}	—	September 4, 2007	Catalina	CSS	·	3.0 km	MPC · JPL
378393	2007 RG_{31}	—	September 5, 2007	Catalina	CSS	TIR	3.6 km	MPC · JPL
378394	2007 RC_{40}	—	September 9, 2007	Kitt Peak	Spacewatch	·	3.3 km	MPC · JPL
378395	2007 RU_{45}	—	September 9, 2007	Kitt Peak	Spacewatch	·	2.3 km	MPC · JPL
378396	2007 RO_{46}	—	September 9, 2007	Kitt Peak	Spacewatch	·	3.8 km	MPC · JPL
378397	2007 RQ_{52}	—	September 9, 2007	Mount Lemmon	Mount Lemmon Survey	HYG	4.6 km	MPC · JPL
378398	2007 RN_{53}	—	September 9, 2007	Kitt Peak	Spacewatch	·	3.4 km	MPC · JPL
378399	2007 RY_{55}	—	September 9, 2007	Kitt Peak	Spacewatch	·	3.8 km	MPC · JPL
378400	2007 RM_{59}	—	September 10, 2007	Kitt Peak	Spacewatch	·	2.7 km	MPC · JPL

== 378401–378500 ==
back to top

Designation			Discovery			Properties		Ref
Permanent	Provisional	Named after	Date	Site	Discoverer(s)	Category	Diam.	Ref
378401	2007 RD_{70}	—	September 10, 2007	Kitt Peak	Spacewatch	·	2.4 km	MPC · JPL
378402	2007 RE_{71}	—	September 3, 2007	Catalina	CSS	·	3.3 km	MPC · JPL
378403	2007 RL_{74}	—	August 10, 2007	Kitt Peak	Spacewatch	·	2.7 km	MPC · JPL
378404	2007 RS_{77}	—	September 10, 2007	Mount Lemmon	Mount Lemmon Survey	THM	2.2 km	MPC · JPL
378405	2007 RS_{90}	—	September 10, 2007	Mount Lemmon	Mount Lemmon Survey	VER	3.0 km	MPC · JPL
378406	2007 RB_{95}	—	September 10, 2007	Kitt Peak	Spacewatch	·	4.9 km	MPC · JPL
378407	2007 RQ_{96}	—	September 10, 2007	Kitt Peak	Spacewatch	·	3.8 km	MPC · JPL
378408	2007 RV_{108}	—	September 11, 2007	Kitt Peak	Spacewatch	·	2.7 km	MPC · JPL
378409	2007 RZ_{108}	—	September 11, 2007	Kitt Peak	Spacewatch	·	3.1 km	MPC · JPL
378410	2007 RR_{118}	—	September 11, 2007	Mount Lemmon	Mount Lemmon Survey	·	3.6 km	MPC · JPL
378411	2007 RS_{119}	—	September 11, 2007	XuYi	PMO NEO Survey Program	·	3.4 km	MPC · JPL
378412	2007 RJ_{128}	—	September 12, 2007	Mount Lemmon	Mount Lemmon Survey	THM	1.9 km	MPC · JPL
378413	2007 RR_{128}	—	September 12, 2007	Mount Lemmon	Mount Lemmon Survey	·	2.5 km	MPC · JPL
378414	2007 RX_{129}	—	September 12, 2007	Mount Lemmon	Mount Lemmon Survey	·	1.2 km	MPC · JPL
378415	2007 RL_{130}	—	September 12, 2007	Mount Lemmon	Mount Lemmon Survey	·	2.6 km	MPC · JPL
378416	2007 RU_{143}	—	September 14, 2007	Socorro	LINEAR	·	1.5 km	MPC · JPL
378417	2007 RV_{166}	—	September 10, 2007	Kitt Peak	Spacewatch	·	2.6 km	MPC · JPL
378418	2007 RV_{174}	—	September 10, 2007	Kitt Peak	Spacewatch	·	4.7 km	MPC · JPL
378419	2007 RU_{187}	—	September 5, 2007	Anderson Mesa	LONEOS	·	3.5 km	MPC · JPL
378420	2007 RR_{201}	—	February 29, 2004	Kitt Peak	Spacewatch	·	3.1 km	MPC · JPL
378421	2007 RX_{205}	—	September 10, 2007	Mount Lemmon	Mount Lemmon Survey	·	2.9 km	MPC · JPL
378422	2007 RP_{207}	—	September 10, 2007	Kitt Peak	Spacewatch	·	2.9 km	MPC · JPL
378423	2007 RM_{209}	—	September 10, 2007	Kitt Peak	Spacewatch	EUP	5.4 km	MPC · JPL
378424	2007 RK_{212}	—	September 11, 2007	Kitt Peak	Spacewatch	·	2.7 km	MPC · JPL
378425	2007 RY_{220}	—	September 14, 2007	Mount Lemmon	Mount Lemmon Survey	HYG	3.1 km	MPC · JPL
378426	2007 RV_{221}	—	September 14, 2007	Mount Lemmon	Mount Lemmon Survey	·	2.8 km	MPC · JPL
378427	2007 RU_{222}	—	September 14, 2007	Siding Spring	SSS	TIR	3.5 km	MPC · JPL
378428	2007 RD_{224}	—	September 10, 2007	Kitt Peak	Spacewatch	HYG	2.5 km	MPC · JPL
378429	2007 RL_{224}	—	September 10, 2007	Kitt Peak	Spacewatch	·	3.6 km	MPC · JPL
378430	2007 RE_{230}	—	September 11, 2007	Kitt Peak	Spacewatch	·	2.9 km	MPC · JPL
378431	2007 RV_{232}	—	September 11, 2007	XuYi	PMO NEO Survey Program	·	3.7 km	MPC · JPL
378432	2007 RP_{239}	—	September 14, 2007	Anderson Mesa	LONEOS	·	3.7 km	MPC · JPL
378433	2007 RT_{246}	—	September 12, 2007	Catalina	CSS	·	3.6 km	MPC · JPL
378434	2007 RT_{249}	—	September 13, 2007	Catalina	CSS	·	4.0 km	MPC · JPL
378435	2007 RA_{250}	—	September 13, 2007	Kitt Peak	Spacewatch	EOS	2.3 km	MPC · JPL
378436	2007 RG_{267}	—	September 15, 2007	Kitt Peak	Spacewatch	THM	1.9 km	MPC · JPL
378437	2007 RJ_{269}	—	September 15, 2007	Kitt Peak	Spacewatch	·	2.6 km	MPC · JPL
378438	2007 RO_{272}	—	September 15, 2007	Kitt Peak	Spacewatch	·	3.0 km	MPC · JPL
378439	2007 RJ_{285}	—	September 13, 2007	Mount Lemmon	Mount Lemmon Survey	·	2.6 km	MPC · JPL
378440	2007 RO_{289}	—	September 12, 2007	Mount Lemmon	Mount Lemmon Survey	·	3.2 km	MPC · JPL
378441	2007 RO_{292}	—	September 12, 2007	Mount Lemmon	Mount Lemmon Survey	·	2.9 km	MPC · JPL
378442	2007 RO_{293}	—	September 13, 2007	Mount Lemmon	Mount Lemmon Survey	THM	2.6 km	MPC · JPL
378443	2007 RQ_{293}	—	September 13, 2007	Mount Lemmon	Mount Lemmon Survey	·	3.5 km	MPC · JPL
378444	2007 RA_{296}	—	September 15, 2007	Kitt Peak	Spacewatch	·	2.8 km	MPC · JPL
378445	2007 RA_{301}	—	September 12, 2007	Mount Lemmon	Mount Lemmon Survey	·	3.1 km	MPC · JPL
378446	2007 RD_{301}	—	September 12, 2007	Mount Lemmon	Mount Lemmon Survey	·	3.3 km	MPC · JPL
378447	2007 RS_{310}	—	September 12, 2007	Catalina	CSS	·	3.6 km	MPC · JPL
378448	2007 RS_{311}	—	September 3, 2007	Catalina	CSS	HYG	2.7 km	MPC · JPL
378449	2007 RP_{312}	—	September 13, 2007	Mount Lemmon	Mount Lemmon Survey	·	2.7 km	MPC · JPL
378450	2007 RS_{312}	—	September 14, 2007	Catalina	CSS	·	3.8 km	MPC · JPL
378451	2007 RY_{312}	—	September 3, 2007	Catalina	CSS	·	2.7 km	MPC · JPL
378452	2007 RA_{313}	—	September 3, 2007	Mount Lemmon	Mount Lemmon Survey	·	2.4 km	MPC · JPL
378453	2007 RD_{315}	—	January 13, 2004	Anderson Mesa	LONEOS	·	3.8 km	MPC · JPL
378454	2007 RZ_{317}	—	February 13, 2004	Kitt Peak	Spacewatch	·	2.9 km	MPC · JPL
378455	2007 RA_{318}	—	September 10, 2007	Kitt Peak	Spacewatch	·	3.3 km	MPC · JPL
378456	2007 RO_{318}	—	September 11, 2007	Kitt Peak	Spacewatch	·	4.0 km	MPC · JPL
378457	2007 RZ_{318}	—	September 12, 2007	Catalina	CSS	·	3.3 km	MPC · JPL
378458	2007 ST	—	September 18, 2007	Hibiscus	S. F. Hönig, Teamo, N.	THB	3.7 km	MPC · JPL
378459	2007 SG_{6}	—	September 21, 2007	Schiaparelli	Schiaparelli	·	4.4 km	MPC · JPL
378460	2007 SL_{23}	—	September 18, 2007	Socorro	LINEAR	·	3.4 km	MPC · JPL
378461	2007 TV	—	September 11, 2007	Catalina	CSS	·	3.0 km	MPC · JPL
378462	2007 TF_{6}	—	October 6, 2007	Dauban	Chante-Perdrix	VER	3.8 km	MPC · JPL
378463	2007 TN_{7}	—	October 7, 2007	Pla D'Arguines	R. Ferrando	HYG	2.8 km	MPC · JPL
378464	2007 TP_{15}	—	October 3, 2007	Eskridge	G. Hug	VER	2.9 km	MPC · JPL
378465	2007 TV_{19}	—	October 6, 2007	Socorro	LINEAR	HYG	3.1 km	MPC · JPL
378466	2007 TF_{20}	—	October 7, 2007	Socorro	LINEAR	·	4.0 km	MPC · JPL
378467	2007 TK_{24}	—	October 11, 2007	Eskridge	G. Hug	·	2.0 km	MPC · JPL
378468	2007 TL_{26}	—	October 4, 2007	Mount Lemmon	Mount Lemmon Survey	TIR	4.0 km	MPC · JPL
378469	2007 TA_{32}	—	October 5, 2007	Siding Spring	SSS	slow	3.8 km	MPC · JPL
378470	2007 TV_{59}	—	October 5, 2007	Kitt Peak	Spacewatch	·	3.8 km	MPC · JPL
378471	2007 TH_{68}	—	October 11, 2007	Alter Satzberg	Pietschnig, M.	·	3.1 km	MPC · JPL
378472	2007 TS_{76}	—	October 5, 2007	Kitt Peak	Spacewatch	·	2.4 km	MPC · JPL
378473	2007 TL_{90}	—	October 8, 2007	Mount Lemmon	Mount Lemmon Survey	·	2.9 km	MPC · JPL
378474	2007 TV_{103}	—	October 8, 2007	Mount Lemmon	Mount Lemmon Survey	·	3.8 km	MPC · JPL
378475	2007 TJ_{106}	—	October 4, 2007	Mount Lemmon	Mount Lemmon Survey	·	3.5 km	MPC · JPL
378476	2007 TM_{110}	—	July 27, 2001	Anderson Mesa	LONEOS	·	3.3 km	MPC · JPL
378477	2007 TO_{115}	—	October 8, 2007	Anderson Mesa	LONEOS	·	3.8 km	MPC · JPL
378478	2007 TU_{117}	—	October 9, 2007	Kitt Peak	Spacewatch	·	3.5 km	MPC · JPL
378479	2007 TJ_{123}	—	October 6, 2007	Kitt Peak	Spacewatch	VER	2.9 km	MPC · JPL
378480	2007 TM_{138}	—	October 9, 2007	Kitt Peak	Spacewatch	·	2.9 km	MPC · JPL
378481	2007 TD_{148}	—	October 4, 2007	XuYi	PMO NEO Survey Program	TIR	3.8 km	MPC · JPL
378482	2007 TY_{150}	—	September 18, 2007	Catalina	CSS	·	3.4 km	MPC · JPL
378483	2007 TF_{152}	—	October 9, 2007	Socorro	LINEAR	HYG	3.7 km	MPC · JPL
378484	2007 TB_{156}	—	September 12, 2007	Mount Lemmon	Mount Lemmon Survey	·	3.5 km	MPC · JPL
378485	2007 TV_{157}	—	October 9, 2007	Socorro	LINEAR	·	2.8 km	MPC · JPL
378486	2007 TT_{168}	—	October 12, 2007	Socorro	LINEAR	·	3.0 km	MPC · JPL
378487	2007 TS_{173}	—	October 4, 2007	Kitt Peak	Spacewatch	·	3.2 km	MPC · JPL
378488	2007 TT_{180}	—	October 8, 2007	Catalina	CSS	·	4.3 km	MPC · JPL
378489	2007 TB_{182}	—	October 8, 2007	Catalina	CSS	URS	3.0 km	MPC · JPL
378490	2007 TB_{212}	—	October 7, 2007	Kitt Peak	Spacewatch	VER	3.2 km	MPC · JPL
378491	2007 TA_{222}	—	October 9, 2007	Kitt Peak	Spacewatch	·	3.3 km	MPC · JPL
378492	2007 TE_{235}	—	October 9, 2007	Kitt Peak	Spacewatch	ELF	4.9 km	MPC · JPL
378493	2007 TL_{259}	—	October 10, 2007	Mount Lemmon	Mount Lemmon Survey	·	3.2 km	MPC · JPL
378494	2007 TZ_{274}	—	October 11, 2007	Mount Lemmon	Mount Lemmon Survey	·	2.2 km	MPC · JPL
378495	2007 TL_{280}	—	September 12, 2007	Catalina	CSS	·	3.7 km	MPC · JPL
378496	2007 TL_{281}	—	September 15, 2007	Kitt Peak	Spacewatch	·	3.1 km	MPC · JPL
378497	2007 TJ_{300}	—	October 12, 2007	Kitt Peak	Spacewatch	·	4.3 km	MPC · JPL
378498	2007 TE_{311}	—	October 11, 2007	Catalina	CSS	·	3.8 km	MPC · JPL
378499	2007 TU_{311}	—	October 11, 2007	Mount Lemmon	Mount Lemmon Survey	·	3.3 km	MPC · JPL
378500	2007 TG_{379}	—	October 13, 2007	Catalina	CSS	THM	2.2 km	MPC · JPL

== 378501–378600 ==
back to top

Designation			Discovery			Properties		Ref
Permanent	Provisional	Named after	Date	Site	Discoverer(s)	Category	Diam.	Ref
378501	2007 TE_{393}	—	October 12, 2007	Goodricke-Pigott	R. A. Tucker	·	4.7 km	MPC · JPL
378502	2007 TW_{404}	—	October 15, 2007	Kitt Peak	Spacewatch	·	1.1 km	MPC · JPL
378503	2007 TR_{413}	—	October 11, 2007	Catalina	CSS	·	3.8 km	MPC · JPL
378504	2007 TK_{418}	—	October 4, 2007	Kitt Peak	Spacewatch	·	2.0 km	MPC · JPL
378505	2007 TS_{421}	—	October 12, 2007	Catalina	CSS	·	4.1 km	MPC · JPL
378506	2007 TB_{438}	—	October 9, 2007	Mount Lemmon	Mount Lemmon Survey	HYG	3.0 km	MPC · JPL
378507	2007 TH_{445}	—	October 3, 2007	Las Campanas	Las Campanas	·	5.4 km	MPC · JPL
378508	2007 TH_{449}	—	October 9, 2007	Kitt Peak	Spacewatch	·	4.4 km	MPC · JPL
378509	2007 UP_{9}	—	October 17, 2007	Anderson Mesa	LONEOS	HYG	4.9 km	MPC · JPL
378510	2007 UB_{14}	—	October 16, 2007	Mount Lemmon	Mount Lemmon Survey	·	3.2 km	MPC · JPL
378511	2007 UO_{14}	—	September 13, 2007	Mount Lemmon	Mount Lemmon Survey	·	2.9 km	MPC · JPL
378512	2007 UE_{19}	—	October 18, 2007	Mount Lemmon	Mount Lemmon Survey	·	2.5 km	MPC · JPL
378513	2007 UN_{23}	—	October 16, 2007	Kitt Peak	Spacewatch	·	3.9 km	MPC · JPL
378514	2007 UX_{28}	—	October 18, 2007	Kitt Peak	Spacewatch	·	3.3 km	MPC · JPL
378515	2007 UU_{56}	—	October 30, 2007	Mount Lemmon	Mount Lemmon Survey	·	5.3 km	MPC · JPL
378516	2007 UG_{62}	—	October 30, 2007	Mount Lemmon	Mount Lemmon Survey	VER	3.2 km	MPC · JPL
378517	2007 UF_{88}	—	October 16, 2007	Mount Lemmon	Mount Lemmon Survey	·	1.1 km	MPC · JPL
378518	2007 UP_{93}	—	October 31, 2007	Mount Lemmon	Mount Lemmon Survey	LUT	5.9 km	MPC · JPL
378519	2007 UT_{121}	—	October 11, 2007	Catalina	CSS	HYG	3.2 km	MPC · JPL
378520	2007 VP_{20}	—	November 2, 2007	Catalina	CSS	·	3.8 km	MPC · JPL
378521	2007 VB_{26}	—	November 2, 2007	Mount Lemmon	Mount Lemmon Survey	·	3.0 km	MPC · JPL
378522	2007 VV_{67}	—	November 3, 2007	Mount Lemmon	Mount Lemmon Survey	·	3.1 km	MPC · JPL
378523	2007 VY_{88}	—	November 2, 2007	Catalina	CSS	EOS	2.8 km	MPC · JPL
378524	2007 VP_{154}	—	November 5, 2007	Kitt Peak	Spacewatch	·	4.2 km	MPC · JPL
378525	2007 VV_{177}	—	November 7, 2007	Mount Lemmon	Mount Lemmon Survey	·	2.9 km	MPC · JPL
378526	2007 VH_{186}	—	November 11, 2007	Catalina	CSS	AMO	310 m	MPC · JPL
378527	2007 VK_{243}	—	November 13, 2007	Mount Lemmon	Mount Lemmon Survey	3:2 · SHU	5.8 km	MPC · JPL
378528	2007 WT_{63}	—	November 21, 2007	Mount Lemmon	Mount Lemmon Survey	·	1 km	MPC · JPL
378529	2007 YC_{22}	—	December 4, 2007	Mount Lemmon	Mount Lemmon Survey	·	870 m	MPC · JPL
378530	2007 YF_{51}	—	December 28, 2007	Kitt Peak	Spacewatch	·	800 m	MPC · JPL
378531	2008 AR_{8}	—	January 10, 2008	Kitt Peak	Spacewatch	3:2	5.6 km	MPC · JPL
378532	2008 AP_{28}	—	January 10, 2008	Mount Lemmon	Mount Lemmon Survey	·	1.8 km	MPC · JPL
378533	2008 AB_{55}	—	December 30, 2007	Kitt Peak	Spacewatch	·	610 m	MPC · JPL
378534	2008 AZ_{91}	—	January 14, 2008	Kitt Peak	Spacewatch	HIL · 3:2	5.8 km	MPC · JPL
378535	2008 AN_{98}	—	January 14, 2008	Kitt Peak	Spacewatch	·	750 m	MPC · JPL
378536	2008 AX_{100}	—	January 14, 2008	Kitt Peak	Spacewatch	·	4.6 km	MPC · JPL
378537	2008 AY_{127}	—	January 11, 2008	Kitt Peak	Spacewatch	·	630 m	MPC · JPL
378538	2008 AC_{138}	—	January 14, 2008	Kitt Peak	Spacewatch	·	800 m	MPC · JPL
378539	2008 BA_{6}	—	January 16, 2008	Kitt Peak	Spacewatch	·	3.8 km	MPC · JPL
378540	2008 BF_{36}	—	January 30, 2008	Kitt Peak	Spacewatch	·	1.6 km	MPC · JPL
378541	2008 BO_{36}	—	January 30, 2008	Kitt Peak	Spacewatch	·	1.1 km	MPC · JPL
378542	2008 CE_{4}	—	December 31, 2007	Kitt Peak	Spacewatch	·	680 m	MPC · JPL
378543	2008 CY_{11}	—	February 3, 2008	Kitt Peak	Spacewatch	V	800 m	MPC · JPL
378544	2008 CA_{25}	—	February 1, 2008	Kitt Peak	Spacewatch	·	710 m	MPC · JPL
378545	2008 CJ_{25}	—	February 1, 2008	Kitt Peak	Spacewatch	·	930 m	MPC · JPL
378546	2008 CP_{34}	—	February 2, 2008	Kitt Peak	Spacewatch	·	870 m	MPC · JPL
378547	2008 CU_{43}	—	February 2, 2008	Mount Lemmon	Mount Lemmon Survey	·	1.1 km	MPC · JPL
378548	2008 CW_{44}	—	January 11, 2008	Mount Lemmon	Mount Lemmon Survey	·	700 m	MPC · JPL
378549	2008 CW_{80}	—	February 7, 2008	Kitt Peak	Spacewatch	·	1.1 km	MPC · JPL
378550	2008 CU_{103}	—	February 9, 2008	Kitt Peak	Spacewatch	3:2	4.6 km	MPC · JPL
378551	2008 CM_{108}	—	February 9, 2008	Catalina	CSS	·	950 m	MPC · JPL
378552	2008 CZ_{110}	—	January 20, 2008	Kitt Peak	Spacewatch	BAP	990 m	MPC · JPL
378553	2008 CN_{138}	—	February 8, 2008	Kitt Peak	Spacewatch	·	770 m	MPC · JPL
378554	2008 CD_{147}	—	January 11, 2008	Mount Lemmon	Mount Lemmon Survey	·	800 m	MPC · JPL
378555	2008 CW_{152}	—	February 9, 2008	Catalina	CSS	·	910 m	MPC · JPL
378556	2008 CL_{156}	—	February 9, 2008	Kitt Peak	Spacewatch	·	1.1 km	MPC · JPL
378557	2008 CY_{159}	—	February 9, 2008	Kitt Peak	Spacewatch	·	690 m	MPC · JPL
378558	2008 CB_{164}	—	February 10, 2008	Catalina	CSS	·	970 m	MPC · JPL
378559	2008 CW_{170}	—	February 12, 2008	Mount Lemmon	Mount Lemmon Survey	·	1.0 km	MPC · JPL
378560	2008 CH_{172}	—	February 13, 2008	Mount Lemmon	Mount Lemmon Survey	·	960 m	MPC · JPL
378561	2008 CC_{183}	—	February 11, 2008	Mount Lemmon	Mount Lemmon Survey	(2076)	710 m	MPC · JPL
378562	2008 CG_{184}	—	February 14, 2008	Mount Lemmon	Mount Lemmon Survey	·	780 m	MPC · JPL
378563	2008 CU_{193}	—	February 8, 2008	Kitt Peak	Spacewatch	·	690 m	MPC · JPL
378564	2008 CF_{197}	—	February 8, 2008	Kitt Peak	Spacewatch	·	580 m	MPC · JPL
378565	2008 CK_{201}	—	February 2, 2008	Kitt Peak	Spacewatch	NYS	1.2 km	MPC · JPL
378566	2008 CL_{205}	—	February 2, 2008	Mount Lemmon	Mount Lemmon Survey	3:2	5.1 km	MPC · JPL
378567	2008 CM_{205}	—	February 2, 2008	Kitt Peak	Spacewatch	NYS	1.2 km	MPC · JPL
378568	2008 CM_{213}	—	February 9, 2008	Mount Lemmon	Mount Lemmon Survey	·	800 m	MPC · JPL
378569	2008 CP_{214}	—	February 12, 2008	Socorro	LINEAR	·	890 m	MPC · JPL
378570	2008 DY_{14}	—	February 26, 2008	Mount Lemmon	Mount Lemmon Survey	MAS	770 m	MPC · JPL
378571	2008 DX_{31}	—	February 27, 2008	Kitt Peak	Spacewatch	NYS	1.1 km	MPC · JPL
378572	2008 DY_{31}	—	February 27, 2008	Kitt Peak	Spacewatch	·	880 m	MPC · JPL
378573	2008 DR_{53}	—	February 29, 2008	Mount Lemmon	Mount Lemmon Survey	·	790 m	MPC · JPL
378574	2008 DY_{53}	—	February 29, 2008	Siding Spring	SSS	PHO	990 m	MPC · JPL
378575	2008 DF_{55}	—	February 26, 2008	Kitt Peak	Spacewatch	·	850 m	MPC · JPL
378576	2008 DB_{56}	—	February 28, 2008	Kitt Peak	Spacewatch	NYS	980 m	MPC · JPL
378577	2008 DC_{56}	—	February 28, 2008	Kitt Peak	Spacewatch	·	770 m	MPC · JPL
378578	2008 DE_{56}	—	February 28, 2008	Nogales	Tenagra II	3:2 · SHU	5.1 km	MPC · JPL
378579	2008 DT_{59}	—	February 27, 2008	Mount Lemmon	Mount Lemmon Survey	·	680 m	MPC · JPL
378580	2008 DA_{60}	—	January 28, 2004	Kitt Peak	Spacewatch	·	1.8 km	MPC · JPL
378581	2008 DV_{67}	—	February 29, 2008	Kitt Peak	Spacewatch	·	820 m	MPC · JPL
378582	2008 DK_{82}	—	February 28, 2008	Kitt Peak	Spacewatch	·	1.1 km	MPC · JPL
378583	2008 DM_{84}	—	February 25, 2008	Mount Lemmon	Mount Lemmon Survey	·	850 m	MPC · JPL
378584	2008 DK_{89}	—	February 28, 2008	Mount Lemmon	Mount Lemmon Survey	MAS	800 m	MPC · JPL
378585	2008 EY_{6}	—	March 3, 2008	Dauban	Kugel, F.	·	640 m	MPC · JPL
378586	2008 EJ_{15}	—	March 1, 2008	Kitt Peak	Spacewatch	V	760 m	MPC · JPL
378587	2008 ER_{20}	—	March 2, 2008	Kitt Peak	Spacewatch	·	750 m	MPC · JPL
378588	2008 EQ_{21}	—	March 2, 2008	Kitt Peak	Spacewatch	·	970 m	MPC · JPL
378589	2008 EZ_{22}	—	March 3, 2008	Catalina	CSS	·	890 m	MPC · JPL
378590	2008 EA_{23}	—	March 3, 2008	Catalina	CSS	NYS	1.1 km	MPC · JPL
378591	2008 EO_{35}	—	March 2, 2008	Kitt Peak	Spacewatch	·	1.5 km	MPC · JPL
378592	2008 EK_{42}	—	March 4, 2008	Kitt Peak	Spacewatch	L5	13 km	MPC · JPL
378593	2008 EV_{44}	—	September 15, 2006	Kitt Peak	Spacewatch	·	920 m	MPC · JPL
378594	2008 EO_{46}	—	March 5, 2008	Mount Lemmon	Mount Lemmon Survey	·	1.1 km	MPC · JPL
378595	2008 EK_{47}	—	March 5, 2008	Mount Lemmon	Mount Lemmon Survey	·	1.3 km	MPC · JPL
378596	2008 EH_{48}	—	March 5, 2008	Kitt Peak	Spacewatch	V	780 m	MPC · JPL
378597	2008 EV_{52}	—	March 6, 2008	Mount Lemmon	Mount Lemmon Survey	·	1.3 km	MPC · JPL
378598	2008 EL_{58}	—	January 10, 2008	Kitt Peak	Spacewatch	V	720 m	MPC · JPL
378599	2008 EP_{88}	—	March 7, 2008	Socorro	LINEAR	(2076)	1.0 km	MPC · JPL
378600	2008 EM_{89}	—	March 9, 2008	Socorro	LINEAR	·	1.6 km	MPC · JPL

== 378601–378700 ==
back to top

Designation			Discovery			Properties		Ref
Permanent	Provisional	Named after	Date	Site	Discoverer(s)	Category	Diam.	Ref
378601	2008 EA_{108}	—	March 7, 2008	Mount Lemmon	Mount Lemmon Survey	·	750 m	MPC · JPL
378602	2008 EQ_{116}	—	March 8, 2008	Kitt Peak	Spacewatch	MAS	770 m	MPC · JPL
378603	2008 EG_{121}	—	March 9, 2008	Kitt Peak	Spacewatch	·	1.3 km	MPC · JPL
378604	2008 ER_{137}	—	March 11, 2008	Kitt Peak	Spacewatch	·	1.2 km	MPC · JPL
378605	2008 EF_{149}	—	March 3, 2008	Purple Mountain	PMO NEO Survey Program	·	1.3 km	MPC · JPL
378606	2008 EN_{154}	—	March 4, 2008	Mount Lemmon	Mount Lemmon Survey	·	1.3 km	MPC · JPL
378607	2008 EW_{156}	—	March 10, 2008	Kitt Peak	Spacewatch	·	590 m	MPC · JPL
378608	2008 EW_{157}	—	March 1, 2008	Kitt Peak	Spacewatch	·	880 m	MPC · JPL
378609	2008 ES_{164}	—	March 1, 2008	Kitt Peak	Spacewatch	V	810 m	MPC · JPL
378610	2008 FT_{6}	—	March 29, 2008	Kitt Peak	Spacewatch	AMO +1km · slow	1.2 km	MPC · JPL
378611	2008 FY_{15}	—	March 26, 2008	Kitt Peak	Spacewatch	·	1.7 km	MPC · JPL
378612	2008 FW_{39}	—	March 28, 2008	Kitt Peak	Spacewatch	·	660 m	MPC · JPL
378613	2008 FE_{41}	—	March 28, 2008	Kitt Peak	Spacewatch	·	900 m	MPC · JPL
378614	2008 FK_{42}	—	March 28, 2008	Mount Lemmon	Mount Lemmon Survey	CLA	1.6 km	MPC · JPL
378615	2008 FQ_{53}	—	March 28, 2008	Mount Lemmon	Mount Lemmon Survey	·	1.2 km	MPC · JPL
378616	2008 FN_{55}	—	March 28, 2008	Mount Lemmon	Mount Lemmon Survey	V	660 m	MPC · JPL
378617	2008 FS_{66}	—	March 28, 2008	Kitt Peak	Spacewatch	L5	14 km	MPC · JPL
378618	2008 FT_{66}	—	March 28, 2008	Kitt Peak	Spacewatch	·	1.5 km	MPC · JPL
378619	2008 FW_{66}	—	March 28, 2008	Kitt Peak	Spacewatch	·	690 m	MPC · JPL
378620	2008 FY_{66}	—	March 28, 2008	Kitt Peak	Spacewatch	L5 · (291316) · 010	11 km	MPC · JPL
378621	2008 FV_{68}	—	March 28, 2008	Mount Lemmon	Mount Lemmon Survey	·	1.3 km	MPC · JPL
378622	2008 FE_{69}	—	March 28, 2008	Mount Lemmon	Mount Lemmon Survey	·	700 m	MPC · JPL
378623	2008 FY_{74}	—	March 31, 2008	Mount Lemmon	Mount Lemmon Survey	·	1.2 km	MPC · JPL
378624	2008 FV_{76}	—	March 27, 2008	Kitt Peak	Spacewatch	·	660 m	MPC · JPL
378625	2008 FM_{83}	—	March 28, 2008	Kitt Peak	Spacewatch	·	1.3 km	MPC · JPL
378626	2008 FY_{89}	—	March 29, 2008	Mount Lemmon	Mount Lemmon Survey	NYS	1.1 km	MPC · JPL
378627	2008 FP_{97}	—	March 30, 2008	Kitt Peak	Spacewatch	·	970 m	MPC · JPL
378628	2008 FK_{102}	—	March 30, 2008	Kitt Peak	Spacewatch	·	1.2 km	MPC · JPL
378629	2008 FZ_{102}	—	March 30, 2008	Kitt Peak	Spacewatch	V	700 m	MPC · JPL
378630	2008 FT_{104}	—	March 30, 2008	Kitt Peak	Spacewatch	V	790 m	MPC · JPL
378631	2008 FV_{107}	—	March 31, 2008	Kitt Peak	Spacewatch	·	1.2 km	MPC · JPL
378632	2008 FX_{107}	—	March 31, 2008	Kitt Peak	Spacewatch	·	660 m	MPC · JPL
378633	2008 FD_{115}	—	March 31, 2008	Mount Lemmon	Mount Lemmon Survey	V	680 m	MPC · JPL
378634	2008 FM_{116}	—	March 31, 2008	Kitt Peak	Spacewatch	·	1.4 km	MPC · JPL
378635	2008 FQ_{127}	—	March 26, 2008	Mount Lemmon	Mount Lemmon Survey	·	660 m	MPC · JPL
378636	2008 FM_{128}	—	March 28, 2008	Mount Lemmon	Mount Lemmon Survey	·	1.4 km	MPC · JPL
378637	2008 FM_{129}	—	March 31, 2008	Kitt Peak	Spacewatch	·	1.3 km	MPC · JPL
378638	2008 FT_{129}	—	March 31, 2008	Kitt Peak	Spacewatch	·	1.1 km	MPC · JPL
378639	2008 FG_{130}	—	March 29, 2008	Kitt Peak	Spacewatch	·	630 m	MPC · JPL
378640	2008 FC_{133}	—	March 30, 2008	Kitt Peak	Spacewatch	L5	9.0 km	MPC · JPL
378641	2008 FX_{134}	—	March 30, 2008	Kitt Peak	Spacewatch	L5	8.9 km	MPC · JPL
378642	2008 FR_{136}	—	March 29, 2008	Kitt Peak	Spacewatch	·	900 m	MPC · JPL
378643	2008 FT_{137}	—	March 31, 2008	Kitt Peak	Spacewatch	·	1.4 km	MPC · JPL
378644	2008 GG_{4}	—	April 7, 2008	Grove Creek	Tozzi, F.	PHO	1.2 km	MPC · JPL
378645	2008 GU_{10}	—	February 23, 2004	Socorro	LINEAR	MAS	850 m	MPC · JPL
378646	2008 GQ_{27}	—	April 3, 2008	Mount Lemmon	Mount Lemmon Survey	·	750 m	MPC · JPL
378647	2008 GF_{35}	—	April 3, 2008	Kitt Peak	Spacewatch	PHO	1.3 km	MPC · JPL
378648	2008 GM_{35}	—	April 3, 2008	Kitt Peak	Spacewatch	L5	8.3 km	MPC · JPL
378649	2008 GH_{37}	—	April 3, 2008	Kitt Peak	Spacewatch	·	1.2 km	MPC · JPL
378650	2008 GS_{37}	—	April 3, 2008	Kitt Peak	Spacewatch	·	1.4 km	MPC · JPL
378651	2008 GF_{41}	—	November 28, 1999	Kitt Peak	Spacewatch	V	550 m	MPC · JPL
378652	2008 GR_{41}	—	September 19, 2001	Kitt Peak	Spacewatch	L5	8.0 km	MPC · JPL
378653	2008 GY_{46}	—	April 4, 2008	Kitt Peak	Spacewatch	·	1.4 km	MPC · JPL
378654	2008 GZ_{52}	—	April 5, 2008	Mount Lemmon	Mount Lemmon Survey	L5	10 km	MPC · JPL
378655	2008 GY_{72}	—	April 7, 2008	Mount Lemmon	Mount Lemmon Survey	·	670 m	MPC · JPL
378656	2008 GB_{73}	—	April 7, 2008	Mount Lemmon	Mount Lemmon Survey	·	1.2 km	MPC · JPL
378657	2008 GO_{77}	—	April 7, 2008	Kitt Peak	Spacewatch	·	1.2 km	MPC · JPL
378658	2008 GV_{82}	—	April 8, 2008	Kitt Peak	Spacewatch	·	1.3 km	MPC · JPL
378659	2008 GU_{97}	—	April 8, 2008	Kitt Peak	Spacewatch	NYS	1.3 km	MPC · JPL
378660	2008 GQ_{100}	—	April 1, 2008	Kitt Peak	Spacewatch	·	1.1 km	MPC · JPL
378661	2008 GR_{103}	—	March 28, 2008	Kitt Peak	Spacewatch	·	1.4 km	MPC · JPL
378662	2008 GK_{104}	—	April 11, 2008	Kitt Peak	Spacewatch	V	640 m	MPC · JPL
378663	2008 GU_{106}	—	April 12, 2008	Catalina	CSS	·	990 m	MPC · JPL
378664	2008 GL_{107}	—	April 12, 2008	Mount Lemmon	Mount Lemmon Survey	·	1.3 km	MPC · JPL
378665	2008 GB_{116}	—	April 11, 2008	Kitt Peak	Spacewatch	L5	9.1 km	MPC · JPL
378666	2008 GS_{117}	—	April 11, 2008	Kitt Peak	Spacewatch	·	1.2 km	MPC · JPL
378667	2008 GK_{137}	—	April 6, 2008	Mount Lemmon	Mount Lemmon Survey	·	1.4 km	MPC · JPL
378668	2008 GN_{140}	—	April 7, 2008	Kitt Peak	Spacewatch	L5	7.8 km	MPC · JPL
378669 Rivas	2008 HO_{4}	Rivas	April 29, 2008	Vicques	M. Ory	·	1.2 km	MPC · JPL
378670	2008 HR_{8}	—	April 24, 2008	Kitt Peak	Spacewatch	PHO	1.0 km	MPC · JPL
378671	2008 HZ_{11}	—	April 24, 2008	Kitt Peak	Spacewatch	PHO	810 m	MPC · JPL
378672	2008 HD_{13}	—	April 25, 2008	Kitt Peak	Spacewatch	L5	9.5 km	MPC · JPL
378673	2008 HT_{19}	—	April 14, 2008	Mount Lemmon	Mount Lemmon Survey	·	1.1 km	MPC · JPL
378674	2008 HV_{21}	—	April 26, 2008	Mount Lemmon	Mount Lemmon Survey	·	1.3 km	MPC · JPL
378675	2008 HW_{39}	—	April 26, 2008	Mount Lemmon	Mount Lemmon Survey	·	1.1 km	MPC · JPL
378676	2008 HB_{42}	—	April 26, 2008	Mount Lemmon	Mount Lemmon Survey	V	710 m	MPC · JPL
378677	2008 HX_{45}	—	April 28, 2008	Kitt Peak	Spacewatch	·	1.2 km	MPC · JPL
378678	2008 HG_{50}	—	April 29, 2008	Kitt Peak	Spacewatch	·	1.2 km	MPC · JPL
378679	2008 HU_{55}	—	April 29, 2008	Kitt Peak	Spacewatch	·	1.1 km	MPC · JPL
378680	2008 HX_{62}	—	April 28, 2008	Kitt Peak	Spacewatch	L5	10 km	MPC · JPL
378681	2008 HJ_{64}	—	April 29, 2008	Mount Lemmon	Mount Lemmon Survey	L5	8.6 km	MPC · JPL
378682	2008 JD_{4}	—	May 1, 2008	Kitt Peak	Spacewatch	·	1.4 km	MPC · JPL
378683	2008 JZ_{11}	—	May 3, 2008	Kitt Peak	Spacewatch	ADE	1.7 km	MPC · JPL
378684	2008 JC_{17}	—	May 3, 2008	Mount Lemmon	Mount Lemmon Survey	·	1.1 km	MPC · JPL
378685	2008 JJ_{22}	—	May 1, 2008	Siding Spring	SSS	·	2.0 km	MPC · JPL
378686	2008 JW_{26}	—	May 7, 2008	Kitt Peak	Spacewatch	L5	10 km	MPC · JPL
378687	2008 JM_{30}	—	May 11, 2008	Kitt Peak	Spacewatch	·	1.4 km	MPC · JPL
378688	2008 JN_{38}	—	May 15, 2008	Mount Lemmon	Mount Lemmon Survey	·	1.6 km	MPC · JPL
378689	2008 KT_{4}	—	May 27, 2008	Kitt Peak	Spacewatch	·	1.4 km	MPC · JPL
378690	2008 KL_{5}	—	March 15, 2004	Kitt Peak	Spacewatch	·	910 m	MPC · JPL
378691	2008 KU_{7}	—	May 27, 2008	Kitt Peak	Spacewatch	L5	10 km	MPC · JPL
378692	2008 KO_{10}	—	March 30, 2008	Kitt Peak	Spacewatch	·	1.2 km	MPC · JPL
378693	2008 KE_{15}	—	May 27, 2008	Mount Lemmon	Mount Lemmon Survey	·	1.1 km	MPC · JPL
378694	2008 KT_{28}	—	May 31, 2008	Kitt Peak	Spacewatch	L5	10 km	MPC · JPL
378695	2008 KG_{30}	—	April 27, 2008	Mount Lemmon	Mount Lemmon Survey	EUN	1.3 km	MPC · JPL
378696	2008 KU_{38}	—	May 30, 2008	Kitt Peak	Spacewatch	·	1.3 km	MPC · JPL
378697	2008 LS	—	June 1, 2008	Mount Lemmon	Mount Lemmon Survey	·	1.4 km	MPC · JPL
378698	2008 LT_{11}	—	May 3, 2008	Mount Lemmon	Mount Lemmon Survey	·	1.4 km	MPC · JPL
378699	2008 LE_{17}	—	June 10, 2008	Kitt Peak	Spacewatch	·	1.2 km	MPC · JPL
378700	2008 MU	—	June 26, 2008	Siding Spring	SSS	·	2.1 km	MPC · JPL

== 378701–378800 ==
back to top

Designation			Discovery			Properties		Ref
Permanent	Provisional	Named after	Date	Site	Discoverer(s)	Category	Diam.	Ref
378701	2008 NJ_{1}	—	July 1, 2008	Bergisch Gladbach	W. Bickel	·	660 m	MPC · JPL
378702	2008 OV_{3}	—	July 25, 2008	Siding Spring	SSS	·	2.4 km	MPC · JPL
378703	2008 OS_{19}	—	July 29, 2008	Kitt Peak	Spacewatch	MRX	1.0 km	MPC · JPL
378704	2008 OR_{20}	—	July 29, 2008	Kitt Peak	Spacewatch	·	1.8 km	MPC · JPL
378705	2008 OQ_{23}	—	July 29, 2008	Kitt Peak	Spacewatch	·	2.2 km	MPC · JPL
378706	2008 OD_{24}	—	July 30, 2008	Kitt Peak	Spacewatch	AGN	1.3 km	MPC · JPL
378707	2008 PP_{6}	—	August 2, 2008	Siding Spring	SSS	·	2.2 km	MPC · JPL
378708	2008 PD_{13}	—	August 10, 2008	La Sagra	OAM	EUN	1.2 km	MPC · JPL
378709	2008 PP_{14}	—	July 30, 2008	Kitt Peak	Spacewatch	·	2.9 km	MPC · JPL
378710	2008 PN_{15}	—	August 7, 2008	La Sagra	OAM	·	3.2 km	MPC · JPL
378711	2008 PP_{16}	—	July 26, 2008	Siding Spring	SSS	BRA	2.2 km	MPC · JPL
378712	2008 PO_{20}	—	August 2, 2008	Siding Spring	SSS	·	3.1 km	MPC · JPL
378713	2008 PT_{20}	—	August 5, 2008	Siding Spring	SSS	·	2.5 km	MPC · JPL
378714	2008 PY_{20}	—	August 2, 2008	Siding Spring	SSS	·	3.7 km	MPC · JPL
378715	2008 PH_{21}	—	August 6, 2008	Siding Spring	SSS	·	3.4 km	MPC · JPL
378716	2008 QK_{1}	—	August 23, 2008	La Sagra	OAM	·	3.3 km	MPC · JPL
378717	2008 QL_{6}	—	July 28, 2008	Mount Lemmon	Mount Lemmon Survey	·	2.2 km	MPC · JPL
378718	2008 QH_{9}	—	August 25, 2008	La Sagra	OAM	GEF	1.4 km	MPC · JPL
378719	2008 QJ_{10}	—	August 21, 2008	Kitt Peak	Spacewatch	·	2.2 km	MPC · JPL
378720	2008 QQ_{13}	—	August 22, 2008	Kitt Peak	Spacewatch	·	2.8 km	MPC · JPL
378721 Thizy	2008 QP_{14}	Thizy	August 27, 2008	Pises	Lopez, J. M., Cavadore, C.	HOF	2.6 km	MPC · JPL
378722	2008 QG_{17}	—	August 27, 2008	La Sagra	OAM	·	2.1 km	MPC · JPL
378723	2008 QH_{21}	—	August 26, 2008	Socorro	LINEAR	DOR	3.2 km	MPC · JPL
378724	2008 QO_{22}	—	December 1, 2005	Mount Lemmon	Mount Lemmon Survey	·	2.7 km	MPC · JPL
378725	2008 QS_{26}	—	August 29, 2008	La Sagra	OAM	·	3.2 km	MPC · JPL
378726	2008 QL_{28}	—	August 30, 2008	La Sagra	OAM	·	4.1 km	MPC · JPL
378727	2008 QJ_{36}	—	March 15, 2007	Mount Lemmon	Mount Lemmon Survey	·	2.1 km	MPC · JPL
378728	2008 QH_{38}	—	August 23, 2008	Kitt Peak	Spacewatch	·	2.1 km	MPC · JPL
378729	2008 QD_{42}	—	August 21, 2008	Kitt Peak	Spacewatch	·	1.7 km	MPC · JPL
378730	2008 QD_{43}	—	August 24, 2008	Kitt Peak	Spacewatch	AGN	1.4 km	MPC · JPL
378731	2008 QK_{45}	—	August 30, 2008	Socorro	LINEAR	DOR	2.9 km	MPC · JPL
378732	2008 QA_{46}	—	August 30, 2008	Socorro	LINEAR	·	1.8 km	MPC · JPL
378733	2008 QJ_{47}	—	August 19, 2008	Siding Spring	SSS	·	3.7 km	MPC · JPL
378734	2008 RN_{3}	—	September 2, 2008	Kitt Peak	Spacewatch	·	2.5 km	MPC · JPL
378735	2008 RH_{4}	—	September 2, 2008	Kitt Peak	Spacewatch	·	1.2 km	MPC · JPL
378736	2008 RB_{16}	—	September 4, 2008	Kitt Peak	Spacewatch	·	2.3 km	MPC · JPL
378737	2008 RH_{18}	—	August 24, 2008	Kitt Peak	Spacewatch	·	2.0 km	MPC · JPL
378738	2008 RJ_{28}	—	February 21, 2006	Mount Lemmon	Mount Lemmon Survey	·	1.6 km	MPC · JPL
378739	2008 RK_{33}	—	May 11, 2007	Mount Lemmon	Mount Lemmon Survey	·	1.6 km	MPC · JPL
378740	2008 RC_{35}	—	September 2, 2008	Kitt Peak	Spacewatch	·	3.0 km	MPC · JPL
378741	2008 RK_{36}	—	September 2, 2008	Kitt Peak	Spacewatch	AGN	1.2 km	MPC · JPL
378742	2008 RA_{41}	—	September 2, 2008	Kitt Peak	Spacewatch	·	1.8 km	MPC · JPL
378743	2008 RJ_{58}	—	September 3, 2008	Kitt Peak	Spacewatch	·	2.3 km	MPC · JPL
378744	2008 RR_{67}	—	September 4, 2008	Kitt Peak	Spacewatch	·	1.6 km	MPC · JPL
378745	2008 RS_{67}	—	September 4, 2008	Kitt Peak	Spacewatch	KOR	1.5 km	MPC · JPL
378746	2008 RR_{69}	—	September 5, 2008	Kitt Peak	Spacewatch	NEM	2.2 km	MPC · JPL
378747	2008 RM_{77}	—	September 6, 2008	Catalina	CSS	·	1.4 km	MPC · JPL
378748	2008 RW_{91}	—	September 6, 2008	Kitt Peak	Spacewatch	KOR	1.2 km	MPC · JPL
378749	2008 RR_{92}	—	September 6, 2008	Kitt Peak	Spacewatch	AGN	1.3 km	MPC · JPL
378750	2008 RD_{94}	—	September 6, 2008	Kitt Peak	Spacewatch	·	2.1 km	MPC · JPL
378751	2008 RB_{95}	—	September 7, 2008	Mount Lemmon	Mount Lemmon Survey	·	1.7 km	MPC · JPL
378752	2008 RB_{99}	—	September 2, 2008	Kitt Peak	Spacewatch	·	1.6 km	MPC · JPL
378753	2008 RV_{101}	—	September 2, 2008	Kitt Peak	Spacewatch	·	1.5 km	MPC · JPL
378754	2008 RV_{103}	—	September 5, 2008	Kitt Peak	Spacewatch	·	2.0 km	MPC · JPL
378755	2008 RJ_{105}	—	September 6, 2008	Mount Lemmon	Mount Lemmon Survey	·	2.5 km	MPC · JPL
378756	2008 RD_{111}	—	September 4, 2008	Kitt Peak	Spacewatch	·	1.9 km	MPC · JPL
378757	2008 RT_{113}	—	September 6, 2008	Kitt Peak	Spacewatch	AGN	1.1 km	MPC · JPL
378758	2008 RF_{116}	—	September 7, 2008	Mount Lemmon	Mount Lemmon Survey	KOR	1.1 km	MPC · JPL
378759	2008 RS_{117}	—	September 9, 2008	Kitt Peak	Spacewatch	BRA	1.5 km	MPC · JPL
378760	2008 RF_{118}	—	September 9, 2008	Mount Lemmon	Mount Lemmon Survey	AGN	1.1 km	MPC · JPL
378761	2008 RU_{118}	—	September 9, 2008	Mount Lemmon	Mount Lemmon Survey	·	2.6 km	MPC · JPL
378762	2008 RF_{120}	—	September 7, 2008	Mount Lemmon	Mount Lemmon Survey	·	4.6 km	MPC · JPL
378763	2008 RX_{121}	—	September 3, 2008	Kitt Peak	Spacewatch	·	1.8 km	MPC · JPL
378764	2008 RH_{124}	—	September 6, 2008	Kitt Peak	Spacewatch	KOR	1.2 km	MPC · JPL
378765	2008 RM_{125}	—	September 7, 2008	Mount Lemmon	Mount Lemmon Survey	·	1.8 km	MPC · JPL
378766	2008 RP_{126}	—	September 4, 2008	Kitt Peak	Spacewatch	·	1.8 km	MPC · JPL
378767	2008 RL_{130}	—	September 3, 2008	Kitt Peak	Spacewatch	·	2.0 km	MPC · JPL
378768	2008 RQ_{140}	—	September 9, 2008	Mount Lemmon	Mount Lemmon Survey	AGN	1.4 km	MPC · JPL
378769	2008 RM_{142}	—	September 7, 2008	Socorro	LINEAR	·	3.3 km	MPC · JPL
378770	2008 RD_{143}	—	September 2, 2008	Kitt Peak	Spacewatch	·	3.1 km	MPC · JPL
378771	2008 RS_{143}	—	September 6, 2008	Kitt Peak	Spacewatch	AST	1.5 km	MPC · JPL
378772	2008 RN_{146}	—	September 9, 2008	Catalina	CSS	·	4.0 km	MPC · JPL
378773	2008 SJ_{1}	—	September 22, 2008	Sierra Stars	Tozzi, F.	GEF	1.6 km	MPC · JPL
378774	2008 SH_{5}	—	September 22, 2008	Socorro	LINEAR	·	2.9 km	MPC · JPL
378775	2008 SH_{9}	—	January 25, 2006	Kitt Peak	Spacewatch	·	2.4 km	MPC · JPL
378776	2008 SY_{14}	—	September 7, 2008	Mount Lemmon	Mount Lemmon Survey	·	1.4 km	MPC · JPL
378777	2008 SV_{24}	—	September 19, 2008	Kitt Peak	Spacewatch	·	2.2 km	MPC · JPL
378778	2008 SL_{27}	—	September 19, 2008	Kitt Peak	Spacewatch	·	1.9 km	MPC · JPL
378779	2008 SC_{28}	—	September 19, 2008	Kitt Peak	Spacewatch	·	2.4 km	MPC · JPL
378780	2008 SG_{29}	—	September 19, 2008	Kitt Peak	Spacewatch	AGN	1.3 km	MPC · JPL
378781	2008 SU_{30}	—	September 9, 2008	Kitt Peak	Spacewatch	615	1.4 km	MPC · JPL
378782	2008 SH_{31}	—	September 20, 2008	Kitt Peak	Spacewatch	·	2.4 km	MPC · JPL
378783	2008 SK_{33}	—	July 29, 2008	Kitt Peak	Spacewatch	·	1.8 km	MPC · JPL
378784	2008 SD_{48}	—	September 20, 2008	Mount Lemmon	Mount Lemmon Survey	·	2.3 km	MPC · JPL
378785	2008 SV_{50}	—	September 3, 2008	Kitt Peak	Spacewatch	HOF	2.6 km	MPC · JPL
378786	2008 SW_{54}	—	September 20, 2008	Mount Lemmon	Mount Lemmon Survey	·	2.0 km	MPC · JPL
378787	2008 SR_{67}	—	September 21, 2008	Kitt Peak	Spacewatch	KOR	1.5 km	MPC · JPL
378788	2008 SF_{71}	—	September 3, 2008	Kitt Peak	Spacewatch	(18466)	2.3 km	MPC · JPL
378789	2008 SU_{75}	—	September 23, 2008	Mount Lemmon	Mount Lemmon Survey	·	3.2 km	MPC · JPL
378790	2008 SA_{79}	—	August 24, 2008	Kitt Peak	Spacewatch	·	2.3 km	MPC · JPL
378791	2008 SQ_{84}	—	September 27, 2008	Taunus	E. Schwab, R. Kling	·	1.9 km	MPC · JPL
378792	2008 SY_{86}	—	September 20, 2008	Kitt Peak	Spacewatch	·	1.9 km	MPC · JPL
378793	2008 SR_{92}	—	September 21, 2008	Catalina	CSS	·	3.0 km	MPC · JPL
378794	2008 SL_{99}	—	September 21, 2008	Kitt Peak	Spacewatch	·	2.2 km	MPC · JPL
378795	2008 SU_{99}	—	September 21, 2008	Kitt Peak	Spacewatch	·	2.4 km	MPC · JPL
378796	2008 SE_{103}	—	September 21, 2008	Mount Lemmon	Mount Lemmon Survey	·	1.9 km	MPC · JPL
378797	2008 SQ_{110}	—	September 22, 2008	Kitt Peak	Spacewatch	KOR	1.5 km	MPC · JPL
378798	2008 SG_{114}	—	September 22, 2008	Kitt Peak	Spacewatch	AGN	1.3 km	MPC · JPL
378799	2008 SS_{121}	—	September 22, 2008	Mount Lemmon	Mount Lemmon Survey	·	2.1 km	MPC · JPL
378800	2008 SF_{134}	—	September 23, 2008	Kitt Peak	Spacewatch	PAD	1.4 km	MPC · JPL

== 378801–378900 ==
back to top

Designation			Discovery			Properties		Ref
Permanent	Provisional	Named after	Date	Site	Discoverer(s)	Category	Diam.	Ref
378801	2008 SZ_{137}	—	September 23, 2008	Kitt Peak	Spacewatch	·	4.2 km	MPC · JPL
378802	2008 ST_{164}	—	September 28, 2008	Socorro	LINEAR	·	2.2 km	MPC · JPL
378803	2008 SW_{172}	—	September 22, 2008	Catalina	CSS	·	2.8 km	MPC · JPL
378804	2008 SJ_{173}	—	September 22, 2008	Catalina	CSS	·	2.9 km	MPC · JPL
378805	2008 SD_{187}	—	September 25, 2008	Kitt Peak	Spacewatch	·	2.2 km	MPC · JPL
378806	2008 ST_{188}	—	September 25, 2008	Kitt Peak	Spacewatch	·	1.6 km	MPC · JPL
378807	2008 SH_{189}	—	September 25, 2008	Mount Lemmon	Mount Lemmon Survey	·	2.2 km	MPC · JPL
378808	2008 SJ_{196}	—	September 25, 2008	Kitt Peak	Spacewatch	KOR	1.4 km	MPC · JPL
378809	2008 SX_{206}	—	September 26, 2008	Kitt Peak	Spacewatch	·	3.3 km	MPC · JPL
378810 Deniserothrock	2008 SG_{209}	Deniserothrock	September 28, 2008	Charleston	Astronomical Research Observatory	·	790 m	MPC · JPL
378811	2008 SB_{210}	—	September 3, 2008	Kitt Peak	Spacewatch	·	2.0 km	MPC · JPL
378812	2008 SL_{212}	—	March 9, 2007	Kitt Peak	Spacewatch	DOR	3.1 km	MPC · JPL
378813	2008 SC_{215}	—	September 29, 2008	Mount Lemmon	Mount Lemmon Survey	KOR	1.2 km	MPC · JPL
378814	2008 SY_{217}	—	September 30, 2008	Mount Lemmon	Mount Lemmon Survey	·	2.1 km	MPC · JPL
378815	2008 SO_{225}	—	September 26, 2008	Kitt Peak	Spacewatch	·	1.9 km	MPC · JPL
378816	2008 SC_{233}	—	September 28, 2008	Mount Lemmon	Mount Lemmon Survey	HOF	2.7 km	MPC · JPL
378817	2008 SW_{250}	—	September 24, 2008	Kitt Peak	Spacewatch	KOR	1.1 km	MPC · JPL
378818	2008 SO_{254}	—	September 22, 2008	Catalina	CSS	GEF	1.7 km	MPC · JPL
378819	2008 SE_{259}	—	September 23, 2008	Kitt Peak	Spacewatch	AGN	1.2 km	MPC · JPL
378820	2008 SF_{259}	—	September 23, 2008	Catalina	CSS	EOS	1.9 km	MPC · JPL
378821	2008 SY_{259}	—	September 23, 2008	Kitt Peak	Spacewatch	·	2.3 km	MPC · JPL
378822	2008 ST_{260}	—	September 23, 2008	Mount Lemmon	Mount Lemmon Survey	BRA	1.3 km	MPC · JPL
378823	2008 SB_{261}	—	September 23, 2008	Kitt Peak	Spacewatch	·	1.4 km	MPC · JPL
378824	2008 SK_{264}	—	September 25, 2008	Kitt Peak	Spacewatch	·	1.7 km	MPC · JPL
378825	2008 SN_{270}	—	September 24, 2008	Mount Lemmon	Mount Lemmon Survey	·	3.7 km	MPC · JPL
378826	2008 SH_{271}	—	September 29, 2008	Kitt Peak	Spacewatch	EOS	1.9 km	MPC · JPL
378827	2008 ST_{272}	—	September 24, 2008	Mount Lemmon	Mount Lemmon Survey	·	3.6 km	MPC · JPL
378828	2008 SD_{273}	—	September 29, 2008	Mount Lemmon	Mount Lemmon Survey	·	2.7 km	MPC · JPL
378829	2008 SV_{276}	—	September 24, 2008	Kitt Peak	Spacewatch	WIT	860 m	MPC · JPL
378830	2008 SM_{278}	—	April 18, 2007	Mount Lemmon	Mount Lemmon Survey	·	1.2 km	MPC · JPL
378831	2008 SA_{279}	—	September 28, 2008	Mount Lemmon	Mount Lemmon Survey	·	2.0 km	MPC · JPL
378832	2008 SV_{280}	—	September 29, 2008	Mount Lemmon	Mount Lemmon Survey	·	4.3 km	MPC · JPL
378833	2008 SW_{281}	—	September 24, 2008	Catalina	CSS	EUN	1.6 km	MPC · JPL
378834	2008 SK_{282}	—	September 29, 2008	Mount Lemmon	Mount Lemmon Survey	EOS	1.9 km	MPC · JPL
378835	2008 SH_{283}	—	September 22, 2008	Mount Lemmon	Mount Lemmon Survey	·	1.9 km	MPC · JPL
378836	2008 SK_{283}	—	September 22, 2008	Mount Lemmon	Mount Lemmon Survey	KOR	1.2 km	MPC · JPL
378837	2008 SF_{288}	—	September 23, 2008	Mount Lemmon	Mount Lemmon Survey	·	1.9 km	MPC · JPL
378838	2008 SR_{290}	—	September 23, 2008	Mount Lemmon	Mount Lemmon Survey	URS	3.5 km	MPC · JPL
378839	2008 SG_{291}	—	September 21, 2008	Catalina	CSS	DOR	3.3 km	MPC · JPL
378840	2008 SS_{307}	—	September 29, 2008	Mount Lemmon	Mount Lemmon Survey	·	2.9 km	MPC · JPL
378841	2008 SU_{307}	—	September 29, 2008	Catalina	CSS	·	4.4 km	MPC · JPL
378842	2008 TD_{4}	—	October 7, 2008	Catalina	CSS	APO	390 m	MPC · JPL
378843	2008 TX_{6}	—	August 24, 2008	Kitt Peak	Spacewatch	EOS	1.8 km	MPC · JPL
378844	2008 TX_{15}	—	October 1, 2008	Mount Lemmon	Mount Lemmon Survey	·	1.9 km	MPC · JPL
378845	2008 TE_{17}	—	October 1, 2008	Mount Lemmon	Mount Lemmon Survey	KOR	1.4 km	MPC · JPL
378846	2008 TF_{18}	—	October 1, 2008	Mount Lemmon	Mount Lemmon Survey	·	3.4 km	MPC · JPL
378847	2008 TS_{18}	—	October 1, 2008	Mount Lemmon	Mount Lemmon Survey	·	1.6 km	MPC · JPL
378848	2008 TR_{19}	—	October 1, 2008	Mount Lemmon	Mount Lemmon Survey	·	2.0 km	MPC · JPL
378849	2008 TW_{23}	—	October 2, 2008	Mount Lemmon	Mount Lemmon Survey	HOF	2.5 km	MPC · JPL
378850	2008 TK_{29}	—	October 1, 2008	Catalina	CSS	·	3.0 km	MPC · JPL
378851	2008 TG_{30}	—	September 24, 2008	Kitt Peak	Spacewatch	KOR	1.3 km	MPC · JPL
378852	2008 TJ_{30}	—	October 1, 2008	Kitt Peak	Spacewatch	KOR	1.1 km	MPC · JPL
378853	2008 TC_{31}	—	October 1, 2008	Kitt Peak	Spacewatch	KOR	1.3 km	MPC · JPL
378854	2008 TK_{51}	—	October 2, 2008	Kitt Peak	Spacewatch	·	1.7 km	MPC · JPL
378855	2008 TP_{53}	—	March 26, 2006	Mount Lemmon	Mount Lemmon Survey	·	1.9 km	MPC · JPL
378856	2008 TC_{61}	—	October 2, 2008	Catalina	CSS	DOR	4.0 km	MPC · JPL
378857	2008 TE_{64}	—	October 2, 2008	Kitt Peak	Spacewatch	AGN	1.1 km	MPC · JPL
378858	2008 TT_{74}	—	October 2, 2008	Kitt Peak	Spacewatch	KOR	1.4 km	MPC · JPL
378859	2008 TE_{77}	—	October 2, 2008	Mount Lemmon	Mount Lemmon Survey	·	1.7 km	MPC · JPL
378860	2008 TD_{83}	—	October 3, 2008	Kitt Peak	Spacewatch	HOF	2.9 km	MPC · JPL
378861	2008 TN_{83}	—	October 3, 2008	Kitt Peak	Spacewatch	AGN	1.6 km	MPC · JPL
378862	2008 TZ_{85}	—	October 3, 2008	Mount Lemmon	Mount Lemmon Survey	·	2.0 km	MPC · JPL
378863	2008 TX_{88}	—	September 24, 2008	Kitt Peak	Spacewatch	·	2.6 km	MPC · JPL
378864	2008 TS_{96}	—	October 6, 2008	Kitt Peak	Spacewatch	·	2.2 km	MPC · JPL
378865	2008 TR_{98}	—	October 6, 2008	Kitt Peak	Spacewatch	KOR	1.2 km	MPC · JPL
378866	2008 TH_{99}	—	October 6, 2008	Kitt Peak	Spacewatch	KOR	1.3 km	MPC · JPL
378867	2008 TU_{101}	—	October 6, 2008	Kitt Peak	Spacewatch	·	2.0 km	MPC · JPL
378868	2008 TE_{103}	—	October 6, 2008	Kitt Peak	Spacewatch	·	2.7 km	MPC · JPL
378869	2008 TB_{106}	—	October 6, 2008	Mount Lemmon	Mount Lemmon Survey	KOR	1.5 km	MPC · JPL
378870	2008 TB_{113}	—	October 6, 2008	Kitt Peak	Spacewatch	·	3.1 km	MPC · JPL
378871	2008 TX_{119}	—	October 7, 2008	Kitt Peak	Spacewatch	·	3.3 km	MPC · JPL
378872	2008 TB_{120}	—	October 7, 2008	Kitt Peak	Spacewatch	·	2.5 km	MPC · JPL
378873	2008 TY_{124}	—	October 8, 2008	Mount Lemmon	Mount Lemmon Survey	·	2.2 km	MPC · JPL
378874	2008 TQ_{125}	—	September 23, 2008	Kitt Peak	Spacewatch	AGN	1.3 km	MPC · JPL
378875	2008 TB_{127}	—	October 8, 2008	Mount Lemmon	Mount Lemmon Survey	·	1.8 km	MPC · JPL
378876	2008 TJ_{132}	—	October 8, 2008	Mount Lemmon	Mount Lemmon Survey	·	2.7 km	MPC · JPL
378877	2008 TZ_{134}	—	October 8, 2008	Kitt Peak	Spacewatch	·	2.4 km	MPC · JPL
378878	2008 TN_{137}	—	October 8, 2008	Kitt Peak	Spacewatch	·	1.6 km	MPC · JPL
378879	2008 TF_{147}	—	October 9, 2008	Mount Lemmon	Mount Lemmon Survey	DOR	3.2 km	MPC · JPL
378880	2008 TD_{149}	—	October 9, 2008	Mount Lemmon	Mount Lemmon Survey	(18466)	2.8 km	MPC · JPL
378881	2008 TW_{149}	—	October 9, 2008	Mount Lemmon	Mount Lemmon Survey	AGN	1.3 km	MPC · JPL
378882	2008 TB_{167}	—	October 8, 2008	Kitt Peak	Spacewatch	·	1.9 km	MPC · JPL
378883	2008 TN_{169}	—	October 7, 2008	Kitt Peak	Spacewatch	·	1.7 km	MPC · JPL
378884	2008 TJ_{174}	—	October 2, 2008	Mount Lemmon	Mount Lemmon Survey	BRA	1.4 km	MPC · JPL
378885	2008 TK_{175}	—	October 8, 2008	Mount Lemmon	Mount Lemmon Survey	·	2.5 km	MPC · JPL
378886	2008 TW_{176}	—	October 9, 2008	Mount Lemmon	Mount Lemmon Survey	·	1.9 km	MPC · JPL
378887	2008 TQ_{183}	—	October 2, 2008	Kitt Peak	Spacewatch	KOR	1.3 km	MPC · JPL
378888	2008 TY_{184}	—	October 6, 2008	Mount Lemmon	Mount Lemmon Survey	·	1.8 km	MPC · JPL
378889	2008 TQ_{188}	—	October 10, 2008	Kitt Peak	Spacewatch	KOR	1.3 km	MPC · JPL
378890	2008 UK_{7}	—	December 5, 1999	Catalina	CSS	TIN	1.5 km	MPC · JPL
378891	2008 UV_{10}	—	September 24, 2008	Kitt Peak	Spacewatch	GEF	1.5 km	MPC · JPL
378892	2008 UG_{13}	—	October 17, 2008	Kitt Peak	Spacewatch	KOR	1.2 km	MPC · JPL
378893	2008 UH_{26}	—	October 20, 2008	Mount Lemmon	Mount Lemmon Survey	KOR	1.3 km	MPC · JPL
378894	2008 UC_{29}	—	October 20, 2008	Kitt Peak	Spacewatch	·	1.9 km	MPC · JPL
378895	2008 UF_{32}	—	October 20, 2008	Kitt Peak	Spacewatch	·	2.5 km	MPC · JPL
378896	2008 UK_{32}	—	October 20, 2008	Kitt Peak	Spacewatch	KOR	1.3 km	MPC · JPL
378897	2008 UZ_{36}	—	October 20, 2008	Kitt Peak	Spacewatch	EOS	1.9 km	MPC · JPL
378898	2008 UM_{38}	—	October 20, 2008	Kitt Peak	Spacewatch	EMA	3.7 km	MPC · JPL
378899	2008 UB_{39}	—	October 20, 2008	Kitt Peak	Spacewatch	EOS	2.2 km	MPC · JPL
378900	2008 UR_{42}	—	October 20, 2008	Kitt Peak	Spacewatch	THM	1.9 km	MPC · JPL

== 378901–379000 ==
back to top

Designation			Discovery			Properties		Ref
Permanent	Provisional	Named after	Date	Site	Discoverer(s)	Category	Diam.	Ref
378901	2008 UX_{45}	—	October 20, 2008	Mount Lemmon	Mount Lemmon Survey	·	2.0 km	MPC · JPL
378902	2008 UZ_{45}	—	October 20, 2008	Kitt Peak	Spacewatch	·	2.6 km	MPC · JPL
378903	2008 UX_{48}	—	October 20, 2008	Kitt Peak	Spacewatch	·	1.8 km	MPC · JPL
378904	2008 UL_{51}	—	October 20, 2008	Kitt Peak	Spacewatch	·	3.5 km	MPC · JPL
378905	2008 UF_{54}	—	October 20, 2008	Kitt Peak	Spacewatch	·	1.7 km	MPC · JPL
378906	2008 UV_{57}	—	October 21, 2008	Kitt Peak	Spacewatch	KOR	1.5 km	MPC · JPL
378907	2008 UK_{60}	—	October 21, 2008	Kitt Peak	Spacewatch	EOS	1.8 km	MPC · JPL
378908	2008 UP_{60}	—	October 21, 2008	Kitt Peak	Spacewatch	·	2.1 km	MPC · JPL
378909	2008 UD_{63}	—	October 21, 2008	Kitt Peak	Spacewatch	EOS	2.1 km	MPC · JPL
378910	2008 UM_{63}	—	October 21, 2008	Kitt Peak	Spacewatch	·	1.9 km	MPC · JPL
378911	2008 UX_{66}	—	October 21, 2008	Kitt Peak	Spacewatch	·	2.1 km	MPC · JPL
378912	2008 UM_{71}	—	October 21, 2008	Mount Lemmon	Mount Lemmon Survey	·	3.0 km	MPC · JPL
378913	2008 UX_{75}	—	October 21, 2008	Kitt Peak	Spacewatch	·	3.3 km	MPC · JPL
378914	2008 UN_{76}	—	October 21, 2008	Kitt Peak	Spacewatch	·	3.8 km	MPC · JPL
378915	2008 UD_{80}	—	October 22, 2008	Kitt Peak	Spacewatch	·	2.6 km	MPC · JPL
378916	2008 UV_{84}	—	October 23, 2008	Kitt Peak	Spacewatch	·	3.6 km	MPC · JPL
378917 Stefankarge	2008 UP_{91}	Stefankarge	October 28, 2008	Tzec Maun	E. Schwab	·	1.8 km	MPC · JPL
378918	2008 UQ_{91}	—	October 28, 2008	Wrightwood	J. W. Young	·	5.1 km	MPC · JPL
378919	2008 UH_{93}	—	October 24, 2008	Socorro	LINEAR	·	2.7 km	MPC · JPL
378920 Vassimre	2008 UP_{95}	Vassimre	October 24, 2008	Piszkéstető	K. Sárneczky, A. Kárpáti	·	1.6 km	MPC · JPL
378921	2008 UU_{97}	—	October 26, 2008	Socorro	LINEAR	·	2.9 km	MPC · JPL
378922	2008 UD_{106}	—	October 21, 2008	Kitt Peak	Spacewatch	·	1.8 km	MPC · JPL
378923	2008 UA_{109}	—	October 21, 2008	Mount Lemmon	Mount Lemmon Survey	·	3.6 km	MPC · JPL
378924	2008 UW_{109}	—	October 22, 2008	Kitt Peak	Spacewatch	·	2.0 km	MPC · JPL
378925	2008 UT_{111}	—	October 22, 2008	Kitt Peak	Spacewatch	·	2.3 km	MPC · JPL
378926	2008 UG_{112}	—	October 22, 2008	Kitt Peak	Spacewatch	·	3.9 km	MPC · JPL
378927	2008 UQ_{116}	—	October 22, 2008	Kitt Peak	Spacewatch	EOS	2.0 km	MPC · JPL
378928	2008 UA_{119}	—	October 22, 2008	Kitt Peak	Spacewatch	·	2.7 km	MPC · JPL
378929	2008 UM_{120}	—	October 22, 2008	Kitt Peak	Spacewatch	·	4.1 km	MPC · JPL
378930	2008 UZ_{121}	—	October 22, 2008	Kitt Peak	Spacewatch	·	4.0 km	MPC · JPL
378931	2008 UR_{125}	—	October 22, 2008	Kitt Peak	Spacewatch	·	3.8 km	MPC · JPL
378932	2008 UK_{126}	—	October 22, 2008	Kitt Peak	Spacewatch	·	2.4 km	MPC · JPL
378933	2008 UC_{127}	—	October 22, 2008	Kitt Peak	Spacewatch	·	2.8 km	MPC · JPL
378934	2008 UH_{132}	—	October 23, 2008	Kitt Peak	Spacewatch	·	2.0 km	MPC · JPL
378935	2008 UB_{133}	—	October 23, 2008	Kitt Peak	Spacewatch	·	2.4 km	MPC · JPL
378936	2008 UT_{135}	—	October 23, 2008	Kitt Peak	Spacewatch	·	2.2 km	MPC · JPL
378937	2008 UM_{138}	—	October 23, 2008	Kitt Peak	Spacewatch	·	2.1 km	MPC · JPL
378938	2008 UT_{138}	—	October 23, 2008	Kitt Peak	Spacewatch	·	3.5 km	MPC · JPL
378939	2008 UZ_{139}	—	October 23, 2008	Kitt Peak	Spacewatch	·	2.1 km	MPC · JPL
378940	2008 UP_{141}	—	October 23, 2008	Kitt Peak	Spacewatch	HYG	2.2 km	MPC · JPL
378941	2008 UZ_{142}	—	October 23, 2008	Kitt Peak	Spacewatch	·	4.9 km	MPC · JPL
378942	2008 UN_{144}	—	October 23, 2008	Kitt Peak	Spacewatch	·	1.7 km	MPC · JPL
378943	2008 UC_{147}	—	October 23, 2008	Kitt Peak	Spacewatch	KOR	1.4 km	MPC · JPL
378944	2008 UM_{148}	—	October 23, 2008	Kitt Peak	Spacewatch	·	1.7 km	MPC · JPL
378945	2008 UO_{157}	—	October 23, 2008	Mount Lemmon	Mount Lemmon Survey	·	2.4 km	MPC · JPL
378946	2008 UQ_{159}	—	October 23, 2008	Kitt Peak	Spacewatch	·	4.7 km	MPC · JPL
378947	2008 UZ_{166}	—	October 24, 2008	Kitt Peak	Spacewatch	·	1.9 km	MPC · JPL
378948	2008 UP_{176}	—	October 24, 2008	Mount Lemmon	Mount Lemmon Survey	·	1.9 km	MPC · JPL
378949	2008 UM_{177}	—	October 24, 2008	Mount Lemmon	Mount Lemmon Survey	BRA	1.2 km	MPC · JPL
378950	2008 UM_{178}	—	September 26, 2008	Kitt Peak	Spacewatch	·	1.9 km	MPC · JPL
378951	2008 UU_{184}	—	October 24, 2008	Kitt Peak	Spacewatch	·	2.5 km	MPC · JPL
378952	2008 UH_{185}	—	October 24, 2008	Kitt Peak	Spacewatch	·	1.5 km	MPC · JPL
378953	2008 UQ_{185}	—	October 24, 2008	Kitt Peak	Spacewatch	·	2.0 km	MPC · JPL
378954	2008 UK_{187}	—	October 24, 2008	Kitt Peak	Spacewatch	·	2.5 km	MPC · JPL
378955	2008 UH_{188}	—	October 24, 2008	Kitt Peak	Spacewatch	·	4.3 km	MPC · JPL
378956	2008 UC_{189}	—	October 25, 2008	Mount Lemmon	Mount Lemmon Survey	MRX	890 m	MPC · JPL
378957	2008 UN_{189}	—	October 25, 2008	Mount Lemmon	Mount Lemmon Survey	KOR	1.4 km	MPC · JPL
378958	2008 UP_{189}	—	October 25, 2008	Mount Lemmon	Mount Lemmon Survey	KOR	1.4 km	MPC · JPL
378959	2008 UY_{190}	—	October 25, 2008	Mount Lemmon	Mount Lemmon Survey	·	950 m	MPC · JPL
378960	2008 UL_{196}	—	October 27, 2008	Kitt Peak	Spacewatch	KOR	1.4 km	MPC · JPL
378961	2008 UH_{204}	—	December 19, 2004	Mount Lemmon	Mount Lemmon Survey	·	2.8 km	MPC · JPL
378962	2008 UK_{207}	—	October 23, 2008	Kitt Peak	Spacewatch	AGN	1.2 km	MPC · JPL
378963	2008 UC_{210}	—	October 23, 2008	Kitt Peak	Spacewatch	KOR	1.5 km	MPC · JPL
378964	2008 UF_{217}	—	October 25, 2008	Mount Lemmon	Mount Lemmon Survey	KOR	1.4 km	MPC · JPL
378965	2008 UO_{217}	—	September 28, 2008	Mount Lemmon	Mount Lemmon Survey	EOS	2.1 km	MPC · JPL
378966	2008 UU_{218}	—	October 25, 2008	Kitt Peak	Spacewatch	HYG	2.9 km	MPC · JPL
378967	2008 UR_{221}	—	October 25, 2008	Kitt Peak	Spacewatch	·	3.2 km	MPC · JPL
378968	2008 UC_{226}	—	October 25, 2008	Catalina	CSS	·	2.5 km	MPC · JPL
378969	2008 UV_{229}	—	October 25, 2008	Kitt Peak	Spacewatch	·	3.1 km	MPC · JPL
378970	2008 UN_{237}	—	October 26, 2008	Kitt Peak	Spacewatch	·	2.1 km	MPC · JPL
378971	2008 UT_{239}	—	October 26, 2008	Kitt Peak	Spacewatch	H	570 m	MPC · JPL
378972	2008 UN_{240}	—	October 26, 2008	Kitt Peak	Spacewatch	·	2.1 km	MPC · JPL
378973	2008 UQ_{240}	—	October 26, 2008	Kitt Peak	Spacewatch	EOS	1.9 km	MPC · JPL
378974	2008 UD_{242}	—	October 26, 2008	Kitt Peak	Spacewatch	EMA	4.1 km	MPC · JPL
378975	2008 UT_{242}	—	October 26, 2008	Kitt Peak	Spacewatch	EOS	2.1 km	MPC · JPL
378976	2008 UH_{244}	—	October 26, 2008	Mount Lemmon	Mount Lemmon Survey	BRA	2.1 km	MPC · JPL
378977	2008 UG_{247}	—	October 26, 2008	Kitt Peak	Spacewatch	·	3.1 km	MPC · JPL
378978	2008 UV_{258}	—	October 27, 2008	Kitt Peak	Spacewatch	·	3.2 km	MPC · JPL
378979	2008 UJ_{259}	—	October 27, 2008	Kitt Peak	Spacewatch	·	4.3 km	MPC · JPL
378980	2008 UH_{263}	—	October 27, 2008	Kitt Peak	Spacewatch	·	3.9 km	MPC · JPL
378981	2008 UJ_{263}	—	October 27, 2008	Kitt Peak	Spacewatch	·	2.6 km	MPC · JPL
378982	2008 US_{267}	—	October 28, 2008	Kitt Peak	Spacewatch	·	1.8 km	MPC · JPL
378983	2008 UB_{270}	—	October 28, 2008	Kitt Peak	Spacewatch	·	2.6 km	MPC · JPL
378984	2008 UC_{272}	—	October 28, 2008	Kitt Peak	Spacewatch	·	1.8 km	MPC · JPL
378985	2008 UF_{279}	—	October 28, 2008	Mount Lemmon	Mount Lemmon Survey	·	1.7 km	MPC · JPL
378986	2008 US_{282}	—	October 28, 2008	Mount Lemmon	Mount Lemmon Survey	·	2.1 km	MPC · JPL
378987	2008 UO_{288}	—	October 28, 2008	Mount Lemmon	Mount Lemmon Survey	KOR	1.4 km	MPC · JPL
378988	2008 UG_{289}	—	October 28, 2008	Kitt Peak	Spacewatch	·	3.1 km	MPC · JPL
378989	2008 UW_{289}	—	October 28, 2008	Kitt Peak	Spacewatch	·	3.2 km	MPC · JPL
378990	2008 UC_{290}	—	October 28, 2008	Kitt Peak	Spacewatch	·	3.4 km	MPC · JPL
378991	2008 UV_{291}	—	October 6, 2008	Kitt Peak	Spacewatch	·	2.5 km	MPC · JPL
378992	2008 UF_{295}	—	October 29, 2008	Kitt Peak	Spacewatch	·	2.0 km	MPC · JPL
378993	2008 US_{300}	—	October 29, 2008	Kitt Peak	Spacewatch	·	2.5 km	MPC · JPL
378994	2008 UK_{308}	—	October 30, 2008	Kitt Peak	Spacewatch	·	1.8 km	MPC · JPL
378995	2008 UG_{309}	—	October 30, 2008	Catalina	CSS	EUN	1.9 km	MPC · JPL
378996	2008 UD_{314}	—	October 30, 2008	Kitt Peak	Spacewatch	EOS	2.3 km	MPC · JPL
378997	2008 UK_{316}	—	October 30, 2008	Kitt Peak	Spacewatch	·	3.0 km	MPC · JPL
378998	2008 UZ_{316}	—	October 30, 2008	Kitt Peak	Spacewatch	·	2.0 km	MPC · JPL
378999	2008 UY_{324}	—	October 31, 2008	Kitt Peak	Spacewatch	·	4.9 km	MPC · JPL
379000	2008 UN_{330}	—	October 23, 2008	Kitt Peak	Spacewatch	·	2.7 km	MPC · JPL

back to top

== See also ==
- Meanings of minor-planet names: 378001–379000
