= List of minor planets: 377001–378000 =

The following is a partial list of minor planets, running from minor-planet number 377001 through 378000, inclusive. The primary data for this and other partial lists is based on JPL's "Small-Body Orbital Elements" and data available from the Minor Planet Center. Critical list information is also provided by the MPC, unless otherwise specified from Lowell Observatory. A detailed description of the table's columns and additional sources are given on the main page including a complete list of every page in this series, and a statistical break-up on the dynamical classification of minor planets.

Also see the summary list of all named bodies in numerical and alphabetical order, and the corresponding naming citations for the number range of this particular list. New namings may only be added to this list after official publication, as the preannouncement of names is condemned by the Working Group for Small Bodies Nomenclature of the International Astronomical Union.

Near-Earth obj.	MBA (inner)	MBA (outer)	Centaur
Mars-crosser	MBA (middle)	Jupiter trojan	Trans-Neptunian obj.
Unclassified

== 377001–377100 ==
Designation			Discovery			Properties		Ref
Permanent	Provisional	Named after	Date	Site	Discoverer(s)	Category	Diam.	Ref
377001	2002 QU_{54}	—	August 29, 2002	Palomar	S. F. Hönig	·	960 m	MPC · JPL
377002	2002 QB_{64}	—	August 28, 2002	Palomar	NEAT	·	2.3 km	MPC · JPL
377003	2002 QZ_{82}	—	August 16, 2002	Palomar	NEAT	·	2.4 km	MPC · JPL
377004	2002 QT_{83}	—	August 17, 2002	Palomar	NEAT	·	1.7 km	MPC · JPL
377005	2002 QO_{87}	—	August 17, 2002	Palomar	NEAT	·	790 m	MPC · JPL
377006	2002 QY_{99}	—	August 29, 2002	Palomar	NEAT	·	810 m	MPC · JPL
377007	2002 QL_{100}	—	August 19, 2002	Palomar	NEAT	V	780 m	MPC · JPL
377008	2002 QQ_{113}	—	August 27, 2002	Palomar	NEAT	·	980 m	MPC · JPL
377009	2002 QC_{119}	—	August 18, 2002	Palomar	NEAT	·	1.7 km	MPC · JPL
377010	2002 QE_{125}	—	August 28, 2002	Palomar	NEAT	·	2.5 km	MPC · JPL
377011	2002 QZ_{129}	—	August 17, 2002	Palomar	NEAT	·	710 m	MPC · JPL
377012	2002 QJ_{130}	—	August 30, 2002	Palomar	NEAT	·	1.1 km	MPC · JPL
377013	2002 RE_{11}	—	September 4, 2002	Palomar	NEAT	·	3.4 km	MPC · JPL
377014	2002 RO_{12}	—	September 4, 2002	Anderson Mesa	LONEOS	·	1.0 km	MPC · JPL
377015	2002 RP_{27}	—	September 4, 2002	Ondřejov	P. Kušnirák	·	2.3 km	MPC · JPL
377016	2002 RS_{33}	—	September 4, 2002	Anderson Mesa	LONEOS	·	2.4 km	MPC · JPL
377017	2002 RY_{74}	—	September 5, 2002	Socorro	LINEAR	·	1.1 km	MPC · JPL
377018	2002 RK_{80}	—	September 5, 2002	Socorro	LINEAR	·	1.2 km	MPC · JPL
377019	2002 RY_{91}	—	August 11, 2002	Socorro	LINEAR	·	4.2 km	MPC · JPL
377020	2002 RT_{98}	—	September 5, 2002	Anderson Mesa	LONEOS	·	2.5 km	MPC · JPL
377021	2002 RW_{98}	—	September 5, 2002	Socorro	LINEAR	·	2.1 km	MPC · JPL
377022	2002 RQ_{131}	—	September 11, 2002	Palomar	NEAT	·	2.7 km	MPC · JPL
377023	2002 RZ_{132}	—	September 9, 2002	Haleakala	NEAT	NYS	1.0 km	MPC · JPL
377024	2002 RA_{140}	—	September 10, 2002	Palomar	NEAT	·	1.3 km	MPC · JPL
377025	2002 RT_{204}	—	September 14, 2002	Palomar	NEAT	EOS	2.0 km	MPC · JPL
377026	2002 RU_{204}	—	September 14, 2002	Kitt Peak	Spacewatch	NYS	900 m	MPC · JPL
377027	2002 RA_{238}	—	September 15, 2002	Palomar	R. Matson	TEL	1.6 km	MPC · JPL
377028	2002 RZ_{238}	—	September 14, 2002	Palomar	R. Matson	·	1.1 km	MPC · JPL
377029	2002 RT_{240}	—	September 14, 2002	Palomar	R. Matson	EOS	2.5 km	MPC · JPL
377030	2002 RQ_{243}	—	September 12, 2002	Palomar	NEAT	·	2.6 km	MPC · JPL
377031	2002 RK_{270}	—	September 4, 2002	Palomar	NEAT	·	1.5 km	MPC · JPL
377032	2002 RA_{278}	—	September 4, 2002	Palomar	NEAT	·	4.3 km	MPC · JPL
377033	2002 RG_{279}	—	September 12, 2002	Palomar	NEAT	EOS	2.1 km	MPC · JPL
377034	2002 SR_{13}	—	September 27, 2002	Palomar	NEAT	·	5.6 km	MPC · JPL
377035	2002 SM_{15}	—	September 27, 2002	Palomar	NEAT	·	3.3 km	MPC · JPL
377036	2002 SA_{35}	—	September 29, 2002	Haleakala	NEAT	H	760 m	MPC · JPL
377037	2002 SW_{43}	—	September 29, 2002	Haleakala	NEAT	·	990 m	MPC · JPL
377038	2002 SH_{56}	—	September 30, 2002	Socorro	LINEAR	·	2.3 km	MPC · JPL
377039	2002 SW_{66}	—	September 27, 2002	Palomar	NEAT	H	630 m	MPC · JPL
377040	2002 SG_{73}	—	September 16, 2002	Palomar	NEAT	EOS	2.3 km	MPC · JPL
377041	2002 TU_{1}	—	October 1, 2002	Anderson Mesa	LONEOS	·	1.4 km	MPC · JPL
377042	2002 TR_{14}	—	October 1, 2002	Anderson Mesa	LONEOS	·	910 m	MPC · JPL
377043	2002 TD_{33}	—	October 2, 2002	Socorro	LINEAR	NYS ·	1.0 km	MPC · JPL
377044	2002 TH_{44}	—	October 2, 2002	Haleakala	NEAT	·	880 m	MPC · JPL
377045	2002 TA_{47}	—	October 2, 2002	Socorro	LINEAR	H	580 m	MPC · JPL
377046	2002 TU_{49}	—	October 2, 2002	Socorro	LINEAR	·	3.6 km	MPC · JPL
377047	2002 TF_{97}	—	October 2, 2002	Socorro	LINEAR	EOS	2.1 km	MPC · JPL
377048	2002 TG_{119}	—	October 3, 2002	Palomar	NEAT	·	3.0 km	MPC · JPL
377049	2002 TQ_{121}	—	October 3, 2002	Palomar	NEAT	·	3.3 km	MPC · JPL
377050	2002 TR_{121}	—	October 3, 2002	Palomar	NEAT	·	2.8 km	MPC · JPL
377051	2002 TY_{124}	—	October 4, 2002	Palomar	NEAT	·	3.4 km	MPC · JPL
377052	2002 TB_{142}	—	September 15, 2002	Anderson Mesa	LONEOS	·	1.9 km	MPC · JPL
377053	2002 TX_{167}	—	October 3, 2002	Palomar	NEAT	·	4.3 km	MPC · JPL
377054	2002 TT_{190}	—	October 1, 2002	Socorro	LINEAR	·	3.0 km	MPC · JPL
377055	2002 TK_{256}	—	October 9, 2002	Socorro	LINEAR	·	3.4 km	MPC · JPL
377056	2002 TH_{262}	—	October 4, 2002	Campo Imperatore	CINEOS	EOS	2.2 km	MPC · JPL
377057	2002 TG_{265}	—	October 10, 2002	Socorro	LINEAR	·	3.7 km	MPC · JPL
377058	2002 TR_{276}	—	October 3, 2002	Socorro	LINEAR	·	970 m	MPC · JPL
377059	2002 TX_{283}	—	October 4, 2002	Socorro	LINEAR	THB	3.7 km	MPC · JPL
377060	2002 TT_{298}	—	October 12, 2002	Socorro	LINEAR	·	2.5 km	MPC · JPL
377061	2002 TC_{299}	—	October 13, 2002	Palomar	NEAT	H	680 m	MPC · JPL
377062	2002 TY_{302}	—	October 2, 2002	Socorro	LINEAR	·	940 m	MPC · JPL
377063	2002 TZ_{305}	—	October 4, 2002	Apache Point	SDSS	·	1.1 km	MPC · JPL
377064	2002 TC_{317}	—	October 5, 2002	Apache Point	SDSS	EOS	2.0 km	MPC · JPL
377065	2002 TT_{324}	—	October 5, 2002	Apache Point	SDSS	·	860 m	MPC · JPL
377066	2002 TL_{329}	—	October 5, 2002	Apache Point	SDSS	·	3.3 km	MPC · JPL
377067	2002 TT_{333}	—	October 5, 2002	Apache Point	SDSS	·	2.5 km	MPC · JPL
377068	2002 TE_{346}	—	October 5, 2002	Apache Point	SDSS	·	3.3 km	MPC · JPL
377069	2002 TU_{346}	—	October 5, 2002	Apache Point	SDSS	·	3.1 km	MPC · JPL
377070	2002 TV_{370}	—	October 10, 2002	Apache Point	SDSS	·	4.1 km	MPC · JPL
377071	2002 TQ_{373}	—	October 4, 2002	Palomar	NEAT	·	3.0 km	MPC · JPL
377072	2002 TA_{382}	—	October 4, 2002	Palomar	NEAT	·	3.7 km	MPC · JPL
377073	2002 TE_{385}	—	October 10, 2002	Apache Point	SDSS	·	1.0 km	MPC · JPL
377074	2002 UZ_{6}	—	October 28, 2002	Palomar	NEAT	·	1.4 km	MPC · JPL
377075	2002 UD_{14}	—	October 29, 2002	Palomar	NEAT	TIR	3.6 km	MPC · JPL
377076	2002 UB_{44}	—	October 30, 2002	Kitt Peak	Spacewatch	TIR	2.9 km	MPC · JPL
377077	2002 UK_{44}	—	October 31, 2002	La Palma	La Palma	·	2.6 km	MPC · JPL
377078	2002 UD_{58}	—	October 29, 2002	Apache Point	SDSS	EOS	2.3 km	MPC · JPL
377079	2002 UE_{72}	—	October 29, 2002	Palomar	NEAT	LIX	4.1 km	MPC · JPL
377080	2002 UG_{75}	—	October 31, 2002	Palomar	NEAT	·	3.8 km	MPC · JPL
377081	2002 VA_{1}	—	November 3, 2002	Wrightwood	J. W. Young	·	2.5 km	MPC · JPL
377082	2002 VP_{5}	—	November 2, 2002	La Palma	La Palma	·	2.2 km	MPC · JPL
377083	2002 VR_{15}	—	November 1, 2002	Haleakala	NEAT	NYS	1.4 km	MPC · JPL
377084	2002 VX_{64}	—	November 7, 2002	Socorro	LINEAR	·	1.6 km	MPC · JPL
377085	2002 VK_{76}	—	November 7, 2002	Socorro	LINEAR	·	3.7 km	MPC · JPL
377086	2002 VJ_{100}	—	November 11, 2002	Socorro	LINEAR	·	5.2 km	MPC · JPL
377087	2002 VB_{109}	—	November 12, 2002	Socorro	LINEAR	·	2.8 km	MPC · JPL
377088	2002 VP_{142}	—	November 5, 2002	Palomar	NEAT	NYS	1.5 km	MPC · JPL
377089	2002 VY_{142}	—	November 12, 2002	Palomar	NEAT	MAS	620 m	MPC · JPL
377090	2002 VF_{144}	—	November 4, 2002	Palomar	NEAT	MAS	830 m	MPC · JPL
377091	2002 VW_{144}	—	November 4, 2002	Palomar	NEAT	·	3.8 km	MPC · JPL
377092	2002 VX_{145}	—	November 5, 2002	Palomar	NEAT	·	3.9 km	MPC · JPL
377093	2002 VX_{146}	—	November 4, 2002	Palomar	NEAT	·	2.3 km	MPC · JPL
377094	2002 WD_{1}	—	November 23, 2002	Palomar	NEAT	L5	10 km	MPC · JPL
377095	2002 WD_{2}	—	November 23, 2002	Palomar	NEAT	·	3.8 km	MPC · JPL
377096	2002 WM_{2}	—	November 23, 2002	Palomar	NEAT	·	4.7 km	MPC · JPL
377097	2002 WQ_{4}	—	November 24, 2002	Palomar	NEAT	APO · PHA	410 m	MPC · JPL
377098	2002 WD_{7}	—	November 24, 2002	Palomar	NEAT	PHO	1.0 km	MPC · JPL
377099	2002 WN_{7}	—	November 24, 2002	Palomar	NEAT	·	3.0 km	MPC · JPL
377100	2002 WR_{15}	—	November 28, 2002	Anderson Mesa	LONEOS	·	3.6 km	MPC · JPL

== 377101–377200 ==
back to top

Designation			Discovery			Properties		Ref
Permanent	Provisional	Named after	Date	Site	Discoverer(s)	Category	Diam.	Ref
377101	2002 WP_{19}	—	November 24, 2002	Palomar	S. F. Hönig	EOS	2.5 km	MPC · JPL
377102	2002 WT_{21}	—	November 16, 2002	Palomar	NEAT	NYS	1.1 km	MPC · JPL
377103	2002 WX_{24}	—	November 25, 2002	Palomar	NEAT	·	2.4 km	MPC · JPL
377104	2002 WK_{25}	—	November 25, 2002	Palomar	NEAT	·	1.0 km	MPC · JPL
377105	2002 WQ_{25}	—	November 16, 2002	Palomar	NEAT	EOS	2.1 km	MPC · JPL
377106	2002 WJ_{26}	—	November 16, 2002	Palomar	NEAT	·	4.4 km	MPC · JPL
377107	2002 WK_{28}	—	November 16, 2002	Palomar	NEAT	·	2.7 km	MPC · JPL
377108 Spoelie	2002 WL_{28}	Spoelie	November 23, 2002	Palomar	NEAT	·	3.9 km	MPC · JPL
377109	2002 WS_{29}	—	November 22, 2002	Palomar	NEAT	·	3.8 km	MPC · JPL
377110	2002 WA_{30}	—	November 23, 2002	Palomar	NEAT	L5	9.9 km	MPC · JPL
377111	2002 XS_{2}	—	December 1, 2002	Socorro	LINEAR	·	4.0 km	MPC · JPL
377112	2002 XE_{20}	—	December 2, 2002	Socorro	LINEAR	·	4.0 km	MPC · JPL
377113	2002 XK_{23}	—	December 5, 2002	Socorro	LINEAR	·	3.4 km	MPC · JPL
377114	2002 XL_{29}	—	December 5, 2002	Palomar	NEAT	·	2.7 km	MPC · JPL
377115	2002 XS_{30}	—	December 6, 2002	Socorro	LINEAR	·	1.6 km	MPC · JPL
377116	2002 XF_{48}	—	December 10, 2002	Socorro	LINEAR	EUP	5.9 km	MPC · JPL
377117	2002 XA_{78}	—	December 11, 2002	Palomar	NEAT	H	840 m	MPC · JPL
377118	2002 XQ_{117}	—	December 3, 2002	Palomar	NEAT	·	3.1 km	MPC · JPL
377119	2002 YO_{24}	—	December 31, 2002	Socorro	LINEAR	·	3.7 km	MPC · JPL
377120	2003 AA_{11}	—	January 1, 2003	Socorro	LINEAR	·	4.9 km	MPC · JPL
377121	2003 AB_{24}	—	January 4, 2003	Socorro	LINEAR	·	3.3 km	MPC · JPL
377122	2003 AW_{80}	—	January 12, 2003	Socorro	LINEAR	T_{j} (2.95)	4.7 km	MPC · JPL
377123	2003 BP_{10}	—	January 26, 2003	Anderson Mesa	LONEOS	·	1.6 km	MPC · JPL
377124	2003 BS_{34}	—	January 26, 2003	Haleakala	NEAT	·	3.7 km	MPC · JPL
377125	2003 BF_{55}	—	January 27, 2003	Haleakala	NEAT	·	1.7 km	MPC · JPL
377126	2003 BU_{66}	—	January 30, 2003	Anderson Mesa	LONEOS	·	1.4 km	MPC · JPL
377127	2003 EV_{52}	—	March 8, 2003	Socorro	LINEAR	·	1.2 km	MPC · JPL
377128	2003 FV_{93}	—	March 29, 2003	Anderson Mesa	LONEOS	JUN	1.6 km	MPC · JPL
377129	2003 GW_{31}	—	April 8, 2003	Palomar	NEAT	·	3.7 km	MPC · JPL
377130	2003 GX_{34}	—	April 8, 2003	Kvistaberg	Uppsala-DLR Asteroid Survey	·	2.8 km	MPC · JPL
377131	2003 GW_{56}	—	April 7, 2003	Kitt Peak	Spacewatch	·	2.0 km	MPC · JPL
377132	2003 HZ_{12}	—	April 7, 2003	Kitt Peak	Spacewatch	JUN	1.2 km	MPC · JPL
377133	2003 HE_{55}	—	April 25, 2003	Kitt Peak	Spacewatch	·	1.0 km	MPC · JPL
377134	2003 JJ_{16}	—	May 8, 2003	Socorro	LINEAR	·	1.3 km	MPC · JPL
377135	2003 KR_{3}	—	May 22, 2003	Reedy Creek	J. Broughton	·	1.7 km	MPC · JPL
377136	2003 KR_{15}	—	April 28, 2003	Kitt Peak	Spacewatch	·	2.0 km	MPC · JPL
377137	2003 MO_{5}	—	June 26, 2003	Socorro	LINEAR	(18466)	3.8 km	MPC · JPL
377138	2003 NU_{2}	—	July 1, 2003	Socorro	LINEAR	DOR	3.2 km	MPC · JPL
377139	2003 NF_{8}	—	July 8, 2003	Palomar	NEAT	·	3.3 km	MPC · JPL
377140	2003 OC_{16}	—	July 23, 2003	Palomar	NEAT	DOR	4.3 km	MPC · JPL
377141	2003 OY_{19}	—	July 30, 2003	Needville	Dillon, W. G., Garossino, P.	·	540 m	MPC · JPL
377142	2003 QJ_{10}	—	August 20, 2003	Socorro	LINEAR	PHO	1.3 km	MPC · JPL
377143	2003 QU_{20}	—	August 22, 2003	Palomar	NEAT	NYS	940 m	MPC · JPL
377144 Okietex	2003 QJ_{96}	Okietex	August 30, 2003	Needville	J. Dellinger, Wells, D.	·	3.1 km	MPC · JPL
377145	2003 QM_{99}	—	August 31, 2003	Haleakala	NEAT	·	1.1 km	MPC · JPL
377146	2003 RM_{8}	—	August 26, 2003	Socorro	LINEAR	·	700 m	MPC · JPL
377147	2003 RW_{18}	—	September 15, 2003	Anderson Mesa	LONEOS	·	2.8 km	MPC · JPL
377148	2003 SK_{19}	—	September 16, 2003	Kitt Peak	Spacewatch	·	810 m	MPC · JPL
377149	2003 SV_{47}	—	September 18, 2003	Palomar	NEAT	·	2.9 km	MPC · JPL
377150	2003 SH_{51}	—	September 18, 2003	Palomar	NEAT	·	720 m	MPC · JPL
377151	2003 SO_{68}	—	September 17, 2003	Kitt Peak	Spacewatch	·	600 m	MPC · JPL
377152	2003 SY_{71}	—	September 18, 2003	Kitt Peak	Spacewatch	·	690 m	MPC · JPL
377153	2003 SR_{137}	—	September 21, 2003	Campo Imperatore	CINEOS	·	2.5 km	MPC · JPL
377154	2003 SF_{155}	—	September 19, 2003	Anderson Mesa	LONEOS	·	690 m	MPC · JPL
377155	2003 SV_{181}	—	September 20, 2003	Palomar	NEAT	H	420 m	MPC · JPL
377156	2003 SB_{198}	—	September 21, 2003	Anderson Mesa	LONEOS	·	1.8 km	MPC · JPL
377157	2003 SH_{318}	—	September 16, 2003	Kitt Peak	Spacewatch	AGN	1.4 km	MPC · JPL
377158	2003 SO_{318}	—	September 18, 2003	Kitt Peak	Spacewatch	·	700 m	MPC · JPL
377159	2003 SE_{326}	—	September 18, 2003	Kitt Peak	Spacewatch	KOR	1.3 km	MPC · JPL
377160	2003 SF_{327}	—	September 18, 2003	Kitt Peak	Spacewatch	KOR	1.3 km	MPC · JPL
377161	2003 SG_{328}	—	September 20, 2003	Kitt Peak	Spacewatch	·	2.1 km	MPC · JPL
377162	2003 SK_{331}	—	September 26, 2003	Apache Point	SDSS	·	4.2 km	MPC · JPL
377163	2003 SA_{335}	—	September 26, 2003	Apache Point	SDSS	·	1.6 km	MPC · JPL
377164	2003 SG_{335}	—	September 26, 2003	Apache Point	SDSS	·	2.0 km	MPC · JPL
377165	2003 SK_{339}	—	September 26, 2003	Apache Point	SDSS	·	2.0 km	MPC · JPL
377166	2003 SN_{349}	—	September 18, 2003	Kitt Peak	Spacewatch	·	620 m	MPC · JPL
377167	2003 SS_{371}	—	September 26, 2003	Apache Point	SDSS	KOR	1.2 km	MPC · JPL
377168	2003 TA_{8}	—	October 1, 2003	Kitt Peak	Spacewatch	·	890 m	MPC · JPL
377169	2003 TB_{8}	—	October 1, 2003	Kitt Peak	Spacewatch	·	2.6 km	MPC · JPL
377170	2003 TO_{37}	—	October 2, 2003	Kitt Peak	Spacewatch	·	5.1 km	MPC · JPL
377171	2003 TG_{40}	—	October 2, 2003	Kitt Peak	Spacewatch	·	2.0 km	MPC · JPL
377172	2003 US_{5}	—	September 21, 2003	Anderson Mesa	LONEOS	·	790 m	MPC · JPL
377173	2003 UE_{7}	—	October 17, 2003	Socorro	LINEAR	fast	810 m	MPC · JPL
377174	2003 UR_{38}	—	October 24, 2003	Kleť	Kleť	·	2.4 km	MPC · JPL
377175	2003 UA_{72}	—	September 28, 2003	Anderson Mesa	LONEOS	·	740 m	MPC · JPL
377176	2003 UN_{100}	—	October 19, 2003	Palomar	NEAT	·	2.6 km	MPC · JPL
377177	2003 UJ_{112}	—	October 20, 2003	Socorro	LINEAR	·	810 m	MPC · JPL
377178	2003 UW_{114}	—	October 20, 2003	Kitt Peak	Spacewatch	·	1.6 km	MPC · JPL
377179	2003 US_{135}	—	October 21, 2003	Palomar	NEAT	·	2.2 km	MPC · JPL
377180	2003 UE_{151}	—	October 21, 2003	Socorro	LINEAR	·	640 m	MPC · JPL
377181	2003 UY_{229}	—	October 2, 2003	Kitt Peak	Spacewatch	·	690 m	MPC · JPL
377182	2003 UZ_{233}	—	September 22, 2003	Kitt Peak	Spacewatch	·	740 m	MPC · JPL
377183	2003 UH_{234}	—	October 24, 2003	Socorro	LINEAR	·	810 m	MPC · JPL
377184	2003 UE_{239}	—	October 24, 2003	Socorro	LINEAR	·	800 m	MPC · JPL
377185	2003 UX_{239}	—	October 24, 2003	Socorro	LINEAR	·	4.4 km	MPC · JPL
377186	2003 UG_{248}	—	October 25, 2003	Socorro	LINEAR	·	860 m	MPC · JPL
377187	2003 UV_{255}	—	October 25, 2003	Kitt Peak	Spacewatch	KOR	1.2 km	MPC · JPL
377188	2003 UB_{338}	—	October 18, 2003	Apache Point	SDSS	·	1.7 km	MPC · JPL
377189	2003 UZ_{343}	—	October 19, 2003	Kitt Peak	Spacewatch	·	1.9 km	MPC · JPL
377190	2003 UR_{346}	—	October 19, 2003	Apache Point	SDSS	·	1.7 km	MPC · JPL
377191	2003 UU_{350}	—	October 19, 2003	Apache Point	SDSS	·	1.5 km	MPC · JPL
377192	2003 VV_{10}	—	November 15, 2003	Kitt Peak	Spacewatch	·	980 m	MPC · JPL
377193	2003 WR_{9}	—	November 18, 2003	Kitt Peak	Spacewatch	EOS	2.2 km	MPC · JPL
377194	2003 WP_{12}	—	November 18, 2003	Kitt Peak	Spacewatch	H	470 m	MPC · JPL
377195	2003 WX_{31}	—	October 25, 2003	Socorro	LINEAR	EOS	2.1 km	MPC · JPL
377196	2003 WS_{36}	—	November 19, 2003	Socorro	LINEAR	·	880 m	MPC · JPL
377197	2003 WZ_{39}	—	November 19, 2003	Kitt Peak	Spacewatch	·	710 m	MPC · JPL
377198	2003 WG_{56}	—	November 20, 2003	Socorro	LINEAR	·	5.4 km	MPC · JPL
377199	2003 WU_{62}	—	November 19, 2003	Socorro	LINEAR	·	2.3 km	MPC · JPL
377200	2003 WT_{72}	—	November 20, 2003	Socorro	LINEAR	·	2.9 km	MPC · JPL

== 377201–377300 ==
back to top

Designation			Discovery			Properties		Ref
Permanent	Provisional	Named after	Date	Site	Discoverer(s)	Category	Diam.	Ref
377201	2003 WM_{78}	—	November 20, 2003	Socorro	LINEAR	·	840 m	MPC · JPL
377202	2003 WH_{85}	—	November 20, 2003	Kitt Peak	Spacewatch	·	2.0 km	MPC · JPL
377203	2003 WT_{117}	—	November 20, 2003	Socorro	LINEAR	·	720 m	MPC · JPL
377204	2003 WM_{141}	—	November 2, 2003	Socorro	LINEAR	·	2.7 km	MPC · JPL
377205	2003 WZ_{144}	—	November 21, 2003	Socorro	LINEAR	·	690 m	MPC · JPL
377206	2003 WY_{145}	—	November 21, 2003	Socorro	LINEAR	·	4.5 km	MPC · JPL
377207	2003 WH_{162}	—	November 30, 2003	Socorro	LINEAR	·	800 m	MPC · JPL
377208	2003 WC_{175}	—	November 19, 2003	Kitt Peak	Spacewatch	·	2.0 km	MPC · JPL
377209	2003 WY_{193}	—	November 19, 2003	Kitt Peak	Spacewatch	·	770 m	MPC · JPL
377210	2003 XJ_{10}	—	December 5, 2003	Socorro	LINEAR	·	4.6 km	MPC · JPL
377211	2003 XP_{11}	—	December 13, 2003	Socorro	LINEAR	H	590 m	MPC · JPL
377212	2003 XK_{15}	—	December 15, 2003	Socorro	LINEAR	H	620 m	MPC · JPL
377213	2003 XU_{25}	—	December 1, 2003	Socorro	LINEAR	·	870 m	MPC · JPL
377214	2003 XG_{26}	—	December 1, 2003	Socorro	LINEAR	·	690 m	MPC · JPL
377215	2003 XQ_{38}	—	December 4, 2003	Socorro	LINEAR	·	3.9 km	MPC · JPL
377216	2003 YX_{10}	—	December 17, 2003	Socorro	LINEAR	·	2.3 km	MPC · JPL
377217	2003 YK_{13}	—	December 17, 2003	Anderson Mesa	LONEOS	·	6.7 km	MPC · JPL
377218	2003 YM_{15}	—	December 17, 2003	Kitt Peak	Spacewatch	·	3.1 km	MPC · JPL
377219	2003 YF_{37}	—	December 17, 2003	Kitt Peak	Spacewatch	·	790 m	MPC · JPL
377220	2003 YR_{93}	—	December 21, 2003	Kitt Peak	Spacewatch	EOS	2.6 km	MPC · JPL
377221	2003 YX_{112}	—	December 23, 2003	Socorro	LINEAR	·	3.0 km	MPC · JPL
377222	2003 YD_{117}	—	December 18, 2003	Kitt Peak	Spacewatch	L5	10 km	MPC · JPL
377223	2003 YR_{126}	—	December 27, 2003	Socorro	LINEAR	TIR	3.5 km	MPC · JPL
377224	2003 YL_{133}	—	December 28, 2003	Socorro	LINEAR	L5	14 km	MPC · JPL
377225	2003 YC_{146}	—	December 28, 2003	Socorro	LINEAR	·	2.5 km	MPC · JPL
377226	2003 YN_{152}	—	December 29, 2003	Socorro	LINEAR	·	4.4 km	MPC · JPL
377227	2003 YL_{163}	—	December 17, 2003	Kitt Peak	Spacewatch	EOS	1.6 km	MPC · JPL
377228	2003 YD_{175}	—	December 19, 2003	Kitt Peak	Spacewatch	·	890 m	MPC · JPL
377229	2004 AE_{4}	—	January 15, 2004	Kitt Peak	Spacewatch	V	760 m	MPC · JPL
377230	2004 AF_{6}	—	January 13, 2004	Anderson Mesa	LONEOS	·	3.6 km	MPC · JPL
377231	2004 BA	—	December 23, 2003	Socorro	LINEAR	H	530 m	MPC · JPL
377232	2004 BY_{13}	—	January 17, 2004	Palomar	NEAT	PHO	1.3 km	MPC · JPL
377233	2004 BB_{14}	—	January 17, 2004	Palomar	NEAT	·	790 m	MPC · JPL
377234	2004 BF_{33}	—	January 19, 2004	Kitt Peak	Spacewatch	·	720 m	MPC · JPL
377235	2004 BS_{34}	—	January 19, 2004	Kitt Peak	Spacewatch	·	3.2 km	MPC · JPL
377236	2004 BV_{35}	—	January 19, 2004	Kitt Peak	Spacewatch	·	3.5 km	MPC · JPL
377237	2004 BW_{39}	—	January 21, 2004	Socorro	LINEAR	·	740 m	MPC · JPL
377238	2004 BL_{46}	—	January 21, 2004	Socorro	LINEAR	·	3.3 km	MPC · JPL
377239	2004 BH_{49}	—	January 21, 2004	Socorro	LINEAR	VER	3.5 km	MPC · JPL
377240	2004 BG_{65}	—	January 22, 2004	Socorro	LINEAR	·	2.3 km	MPC · JPL
377241	2004 BY_{68}	—	January 27, 2004	Socorro	LINEAR	PHO	1.6 km	MPC · JPL
377242	2004 BY_{69}	—	January 21, 2004	Socorro	LINEAR	·	2.0 km	MPC · JPL
377243	2004 BU_{80}	—	January 24, 2004	Socorro	LINEAR	EMA	4.6 km	MPC · JPL
377244	2004 BB_{83}	—	January 28, 2004	Kitt Peak	Spacewatch	THM	3.0 km	MPC · JPL
377245	2004 BN_{88}	—	January 23, 2004	Socorro	LINEAR	ERI	1.7 km	MPC · JPL
377246	2004 BA_{95}	—	January 28, 2004	Socorro	LINEAR	H	780 m	MPC · JPL
377247	2004 BY_{108}	—	January 28, 2004	Catalina	CSS	·	5.3 km	MPC · JPL
377248	2004 BD_{115}	—	January 30, 2004	Kitt Peak	Spacewatch	·	2.0 km	MPC · JPL
377249	2004 BE_{124}	—	January 18, 2004	Palomar	NEAT	·	1.2 km	MPC · JPL
377250	2004 BP_{129}	—	December 22, 2003	Kitt Peak	Spacewatch	L5	10 km	MPC · JPL
377251	2004 CN_{39}	—	February 14, 2004	Bareggio	Bareggio	·	4.0 km	MPC · JPL
377252	2004 CQ_{45}	—	February 13, 2004	Kitt Peak	Spacewatch	LIX	3.9 km	MPC · JPL
377253	2004 CV_{46}	—	February 13, 2004	Kitt Peak	Spacewatch	NYS	1.4 km	MPC · JPL
377254	2004 CG_{52}	—	February 14, 2004	Socorro	LINEAR	H	720 m	MPC · JPL
377255	2004 CM_{55}	—	February 12, 2004	Kitt Peak	Spacewatch	·	3.4 km	MPC · JPL
377256	2004 CA_{56}	—	February 13, 2004	Kitt Peak	Spacewatch	·	680 m	MPC · JPL
377257	2004 CG_{59}	—	February 10, 2004	Palomar	NEAT	·	4.3 km	MPC · JPL
377258	2004 CV_{70}	—	February 12, 2004	Kitt Peak	Spacewatch	·	3.4 km	MPC · JPL
377259	2004 CV_{85}	—	February 14, 2004	Kitt Peak	Spacewatch	THM	2.6 km	MPC · JPL
377260	2004 CQ_{106}	—	February 14, 2004	Palomar	NEAT	·	2.4 km	MPC · JPL
377261	2004 CK_{108}	—	February 15, 2004	Socorro	LINEAR	·	800 m	MPC · JPL
377262	2004 CF_{118}	—	January 30, 2004	Kitt Peak	Spacewatch	V	740 m	MPC · JPL
377263	2004 DS_{1}	—	February 18, 2004	Socorro	LINEAR	H	590 m	MPC · JPL
377264	2004 DY_{2}	—	February 16, 2004	Nogales	Tenagra II	·	4.2 km	MPC · JPL
377265	2004 DB_{7}	—	February 16, 2004	Kitt Peak	Spacewatch	V	750 m	MPC · JPL
377266	2004 DV_{25}	—	February 16, 2004	Socorro	LINEAR	·	3.0 km	MPC · JPL
377267	2004 DA_{40}	—	February 17, 2004	Kitt Peak	Spacewatch	NYS	1.2 km	MPC · JPL
377268	2004 DK_{40}	—	February 18, 2004	Desert Eagle	W. K. Y. Yeung	·	1.4 km	MPC · JPL
377269	2004 DA_{50}	—	February 22, 2004	Kitt Peak	Spacewatch	NYS	1.3 km	MPC · JPL
377270	2004 DC_{53}	—	February 19, 2004	Bergisch Gladbach	W. Bickel	·	3.1 km	MPC · JPL
377271	2004 DM_{54}	—	February 22, 2004	Kitt Peak	Spacewatch	VER	3.4 km	MPC · JPL
377272	2004 DN_{56}	—	February 22, 2004	Kitt Peak	Spacewatch	·	2.3 km	MPC · JPL
377273	2004 DM_{58}	—	February 23, 2004	Socorro	LINEAR	·	2.4 km	MPC · JPL
377274	2004 EM_{2}	—	March 13, 2004	Palomar	NEAT	·	1.3 km	MPC · JPL
377275	2004 EZ_{3}	—	March 10, 2004	Palomar	NEAT	·	4.1 km	MPC · JPL
377276	2004 EB_{4}	—	March 10, 2004	Palomar	NEAT	·	4.8 km	MPC · JPL
377277	2004 EU_{7}	—	March 12, 2004	Palomar	NEAT	·	1.4 km	MPC · JPL
377278	2004 ED_{10}	—	March 13, 2004	Palomar	NEAT	·	3.1 km	MPC · JPL
377279	2004 EQ_{16}	—	March 12, 2004	Palomar	NEAT	·	1.3 km	MPC · JPL
377280	2004 EZ_{35}	—	March 13, 2004	Palomar	NEAT	·	3.8 km	MPC · JPL
377281	2004 EZ_{39}	—	March 15, 2004	Socorro	LINEAR	·	5.2 km	MPC · JPL
377282	2004 EZ_{57}	—	March 15, 2004	Socorro	LINEAR	·	3.1 km	MPC · JPL
377283	2004 EB_{61}	—	March 12, 2004	Palomar	NEAT	NYS	1.4 km	MPC · JPL
377284	2004 EJ_{67}	—	March 15, 2004	Kitt Peak	Spacewatch	NYS	1.3 km	MPC · JPL
377285	2004 ED_{70}	—	March 15, 2004	Kitt Peak	Spacewatch	·	1.4 km	MPC · JPL
377286	2004 EK_{84}	—	March 15, 2004	Socorro	LINEAR	·	4.5 km	MPC · JPL
377287	2004 FQ	—	March 16, 2004	Socorro	LINEAR	H	640 m	MPC · JPL
377288	2004 FL_{23}	—	March 17, 2004	Kitt Peak	Spacewatch	·	1.4 km	MPC · JPL
377289	2004 FX_{25}	—	March 17, 2004	Socorro	LINEAR	PHO	1.4 km	MPC · JPL
377290	2004 FE_{30}	—	March 18, 2004	Catalina	CSS	H	660 m	MPC · JPL
377291	2004 FM_{40}	—	March 18, 2004	Socorro	LINEAR	·	3.8 km	MPC · JPL
377292	2004 FF_{46}	—	March 17, 2004	Kitt Peak	Spacewatch	·	4.5 km	MPC · JPL
377293	2004 FF_{58}	—	March 17, 2004	Kitt Peak	Spacewatch	·	2.6 km	MPC · JPL
377294	2004 FV_{62}	—	March 19, 2004	Socorro	LINEAR	·	1.3 km	MPC · JPL
377295	2004 FA_{67}	—	March 20, 2004	Socorro	LINEAR	NYS	1.6 km	MPC · JPL
377296	2004 FF_{79}	—	March 19, 2004	Kitt Peak	Spacewatch	THM	2.1 km	MPC · JPL
377297	2004 FX_{82}	—	March 17, 2004	Socorro	LINEAR	TIR	3.4 km	MPC · JPL
377298	2004 FD_{88}	—	March 20, 2004	Kitt Peak	Spacewatch	·	1.1 km	MPC · JPL
377299	2004 FE_{91}	—	March 21, 2004	Kitt Peak	Spacewatch	·	1.2 km	MPC · JPL
377300	2004 FM_{92}	—	March 18, 2004	Socorro	LINEAR	·	4.4 km	MPC · JPL

== 377301–377400 ==
back to top

Designation			Discovery			Properties		Ref
Permanent	Provisional	Named after	Date	Site	Discoverer(s)	Category	Diam.	Ref
377301	2004 FH_{96}	—	March 23, 2004	Socorro	LINEAR	·	4.1 km	MPC · JPL
377302	2004 FG_{100}	—	March 23, 2004	Kitt Peak	Spacewatch	·	1.3 km	MPC · JPL
377303	2004 FN_{102}	—	March 20, 2004	Siding Spring	SSS	PHO	1.3 km	MPC · JPL
377304	2004 FL_{129}	—	March 28, 2004	Socorro	LINEAR	T_{j} (2.96)	4.1 km	MPC · JPL
377305	2004 FF_{137}	—	March 28, 2004	Anderson Mesa	LONEOS	EUP	6.3 km	MPC · JPL
377306	2004 FG_{151}	—	March 16, 2004	Kitt Peak	Spacewatch	·	1.2 km	MPC · JPL
377307	2004 GW_{15}	—	April 9, 2004	Siding Spring	SSS	MAS	1 km	MPC · JPL
377308	2004 GB_{16}	—	April 9, 2004	Siding Spring	SSS	·	1.7 km	MPC · JPL
377309	2004 GG_{31}	—	April 15, 2004	Anderson Mesa	LONEOS	NYS	1.3 km	MPC · JPL
377310	2004 GW_{39}	—	April 15, 2004	Siding Spring	SSS	·	1.7 km	MPC · JPL
377311	2004 GF_{46}	—	April 12, 2004	Kitt Peak	Spacewatch	·	1.1 km	MPC · JPL
377312	2004 HA_{14}	—	April 16, 2004	Kitt Peak	Spacewatch	NYS	750 m	MPC · JPL
377313	2004 HS_{20}	—	April 19, 2004	Socorro	LINEAR	PHO	1.1 km	MPC · JPL
377314	2004 HM_{25}	—	April 19, 2004	Socorro	LINEAR	·	1.3 km	MPC · JPL
377315	2004 HB_{31}	—	April 22, 2004	Reedy Creek	J. Broughton	·	2.1 km	MPC · JPL
377316	2004 HZ_{31}	—	April 19, 2004	Socorro	LINEAR	·	1.7 km	MPC · JPL
377317	2004 HM_{44}	—	April 21, 2004	Socorro	LINEAR	·	1.4 km	MPC · JPL
377318	2004 HJ_{47}	—	April 22, 2004	Socorro	LINEAR	NYS	1.5 km	MPC · JPL
377319	2004 HE_{57}	—	April 27, 2004	Socorro	LINEAR	H	770 m	MPC · JPL
377320	2004 JD_{17}	—	May 12, 2004	Siding Spring	SSS	H	660 m	MPC · JPL
377321	2004 JN_{28}	—	May 12, 2004	Palomar	NEAT	·	3.2 km	MPC · JPL
377322	2004 JM_{54}	—	May 9, 2004	Kitt Peak	Spacewatch	H	650 m	MPC · JPL
377323	2004 LN_{2}	—	June 11, 2004	Anderson Mesa	LONEOS	·	2.6 km	MPC · JPL
377324	2004 MU_{3}	—	June 20, 2004	Socorro	LINEAR	·	1.7 km	MPC · JPL
377325	2004 NP_{1}	—	July 9, 2004	Socorro	LINEAR	·	1.4 km	MPC · JPL
377326	2004 NL_{2}	—	July 9, 2004	Siding Spring	SSS	(5)	1.6 km	MPC · JPL
377327	2004 NE_{16}	—	July 11, 2004	Socorro	LINEAR	·	1.4 km	MPC · JPL
377328	2004 NA_{21}	—	July 14, 2004	Socorro	LINEAR	·	1.6 km	MPC · JPL
377329	2004 NG_{23}	—	July 11, 2004	Socorro	LINEAR	EUN	1.9 km	MPC · JPL
377330	2004 OK_{3}	—	July 16, 2004	Socorro	LINEAR	·	1.9 km	MPC · JPL
377331	2004 OF_{10}	—	July 21, 2004	Reedy Creek	J. Broughton	·	770 m	MPC · JPL
377332	2004 PW_{11}	—	July 19, 2004	Anderson Mesa	LONEOS	·	1.9 km	MPC · JPL
377333	2004 PP_{12}	—	August 7, 2004	Palomar	NEAT	·	2.3 km	MPC · JPL
377334	2004 PE_{31}	—	August 8, 2004	Socorro	LINEAR	·	2.7 km	MPC · JPL
377335	2004 PF_{39}	—	August 9, 2004	Socorro	LINEAR	·	2.1 km	MPC · JPL
377336	2004 PF_{50}	—	August 8, 2004	Socorro	LINEAR	·	2.0 km	MPC · JPL
377337	2004 PK_{71}	—	August 8, 2004	Socorro	LINEAR	·	1.8 km	MPC · JPL
377338	2004 PO_{72}	—	August 8, 2004	Socorro	LINEAR	·	1.5 km	MPC · JPL
377339	2004 PG_{84}	—	August 10, 2004	Anderson Mesa	LONEOS	·	2.4 km	MPC · JPL
377340	2004 PM_{102}	—	August 12, 2004	Socorro	LINEAR	·	3.4 km	MPC · JPL
377341	2004 PG_{104}	—	August 12, 2004	Siding Spring	SSS	·	1.7 km	MPC · JPL
377342	2004 PM_{110}	—	August 12, 2004	Socorro	LINEAR	EUN	1.5 km	MPC · JPL
377343	2004 QJ_{14}	—	August 20, 2004	Socorro	LINEAR	HNS	1.6 km	MPC · JPL
377344	2004 QQ_{19}	—	August 23, 2004	Kvistaberg	Uppsala-DLR Asteroid Survey	·	1.8 km	MPC · JPL
377345	2004 RP_{7}	—	September 6, 2004	Palomar	NEAT	·	2.6 km	MPC · JPL
377346	2004 RB_{13}	—	September 4, 2004	Palomar	NEAT	·	1.9 km	MPC · JPL
377347	2004 RB_{15}	—	September 6, 2004	Siding Spring	SSS	·	1.8 km	MPC · JPL
377348	2004 RA_{16}	—	August 9, 2004	Socorro	LINEAR	·	1.7 km	MPC · JPL
377349	2004 RK_{34}	—	September 7, 2004	Socorro	LINEAR	·	1.7 km	MPC · JPL
377350	2004 RH_{42}	—	September 7, 2004	Kitt Peak	Spacewatch	·	3.4 km	MPC · JPL
377351	2004 RW_{54}	—	September 8, 2004	Socorro	LINEAR	(5)	1.7 km	MPC · JPL
377352	2004 RQ_{57}	—	September 8, 2004	Socorro	LINEAR	·	2.2 km	MPC · JPL
377353	2004 RL_{62}	—	September 8, 2004	Socorro	LINEAR	EUN	1.5 km	MPC · JPL
377354	2004 RL_{63}	—	September 8, 2004	Socorro	LINEAR	·	1.5 km	MPC · JPL
377355	2004 RS_{63}	—	September 8, 2004	Socorro	LINEAR	·	2.1 km	MPC · JPL
377356	2004 RM_{70}	—	September 8, 2004	Socorro	LINEAR	·	1.9 km	MPC · JPL
377357	2004 RK_{73}	—	September 8, 2004	Socorro	LINEAR	·	2.0 km	MPC · JPL
377358	2004 RF_{74}	—	September 8, 2004	Socorro	LINEAR	·	1.9 km	MPC · JPL
377359	2004 RQ_{76}	—	September 8, 2004	Socorro	LINEAR	·	2.1 km	MPC · JPL
377360	2004 RK_{86}	—	September 7, 2004	Socorro	LINEAR	·	1.5 km	MPC · JPL
377361	2004 RY_{88}	—	September 8, 2004	Socorro	LINEAR	(1547)	1.5 km	MPC · JPL
377362	2004 RG_{105}	—	September 8, 2004	Palomar	NEAT	ADE	2.5 km	MPC · JPL
377363	2004 RK_{111}	—	September 11, 2004	Desert Moon	Stevens, B. L.	·	1.9 km	MPC · JPL
377364	2004 RN_{112}	—	September 6, 2004	Socorro	LINEAR	·	2.7 km	MPC · JPL
377365	2004 RJ_{113}	—	September 6, 2004	Bergisch Gladbach	W. Bickel	·	1.4 km	MPC · JPL
377366	2004 RW_{116}	—	September 7, 2004	Socorro	LINEAR	·	2.8 km	MPC · JPL
377367	2004 RZ_{133}	—	September 7, 2004	Kitt Peak	Spacewatch	·	1.6 km	MPC · JPL
377368	2004 RP_{142}	—	September 8, 2004	Socorro	LINEAR	·	1.9 km	MPC · JPL
377369	2004 RL_{150}	—	August 28, 2004	Tucson	R. A. Tucker	·	1.9 km	MPC · JPL
377370	2004 RW_{152}	—	September 10, 2004	Socorro	LINEAR	·	1.6 km	MPC · JPL
377371	2004 RX_{152}	—	September 10, 2004	Socorro	LINEAR	·	1.7 km	MPC · JPL
377372	2004 RM_{154}	—	September 10, 2004	Socorro	LINEAR	·	1.6 km	MPC · JPL
377373	2004 RQ_{154}	—	September 10, 2004	Socorro	LINEAR	·	1.6 km	MPC · JPL
377374	2004 RY_{185}	—	September 10, 2004	Socorro	LINEAR	·	2.2 km	MPC · JPL
377375	2004 RF_{202}	—	September 11, 2004	Socorro	LINEAR	·	2.0 km	MPC · JPL
377376	2004 RT_{202}	—	September 11, 2004	Kitt Peak	Spacewatch	·	1.7 km	MPC · JPL
377377	2004 RU_{203}	—	September 12, 2004	Kitt Peak	Spacewatch	ADE	1.9 km	MPC · JPL
377378	2004 RU_{207}	—	August 20, 2004	Catalina	CSS	JUN	1.1 km	MPC · JPL
377379	2004 RN_{208}	—	September 11, 2004	Socorro	LINEAR	MAR	1.6 km	MPC · JPL
377380	2004 RP_{208}	—	September 11, 2004	Socorro	LINEAR	·	2.1 km	MPC · JPL
377381	2004 RZ_{208}	—	September 11, 2004	Socorro	LINEAR	·	1.7 km	MPC · JPL
377382	2004 RU_{209}	—	September 11, 2004	Socorro	LINEAR	·	1.7 km	MPC · JPL
377383	2004 RB_{218}	—	September 11, 2004	Socorro	LINEAR	·	2.6 km	MPC · JPL
377384	2004 RM_{254}	—	August 21, 2004	Catalina	CSS	·	2.2 km	MPC · JPL
377385	2004 RK_{263}	—	September 10, 2004	Kitt Peak	Spacewatch	·	1.8 km	MPC · JPL
377386	2004 RF_{273}	—	September 11, 2004	Kitt Peak	Spacewatch	·	1.5 km	MPC · JPL
377387	2004 RC_{288}	—	September 15, 2004	7300	W. K. Y. Yeung	·	1.8 km	MPC · JPL
377388	2004 RW_{308}	—	September 13, 2004	Kitt Peak	Spacewatch	·	1.6 km	MPC · JPL
377389	2004 RG_{310}	—	September 13, 2004	Palomar	NEAT	JUN	1.2 km	MPC · JPL
377390	2004 RA_{317}	—	September 11, 2004	Socorro	LINEAR	·	2.0 km	MPC · JPL
377391	2004 RH_{326}	—	September 13, 2004	Palomar	NEAT	WIT	1.3 km	MPC · JPL
377392	2004 RN_{336}	—	September 15, 2004	Kitt Peak	Spacewatch	·	1.4 km	MPC · JPL
377393	2004 RK_{338}	—	September 15, 2004	Kitt Peak	Spacewatch	·	1.5 km	MPC · JPL
377394	2004 RO_{340}	—	September 7, 2004	Palomar	NEAT	·	3.0 km	MPC · JPL
377395	2004 RW_{349}	—	September 12, 2004	Mauna Kea	P. A. Wiegert	·	1.6 km	MPC · JPL
377396	2004 RU_{354}	—	September 11, 2004	Kitt Peak	Spacewatch	·	1.3 km	MPC · JPL
377397	2004 RB_{357}	—	September 3, 2004	Siding Spring	SSS	·	2.1 km	MPC · JPL
377398	2004 SQ_{1}	—	September 16, 2004	Kitt Peak	Spacewatch	·	1.7 km	MPC · JPL
377399	2004 SY_{3}	—	September 17, 2004	Socorro	LINEAR	MAR	1.4 km	MPC · JPL
377400	2004 SQ_{8}	—	September 17, 2004	Socorro	LINEAR	·	1.8 km	MPC · JPL

== 377401–377500 ==
back to top

Designation			Discovery			Properties		Ref
Permanent	Provisional	Named after	Date	Site	Discoverer(s)	Category	Diam.	Ref
377401	2004 SN_{22}	—	September 7, 2004	Kitt Peak	Spacewatch	·	1.9 km	MPC · JPL
377402	2004 SC_{53}	—	September 22, 2004	Socorro	LINEAR	·	1.7 km	MPC · JPL
377403	2004 TK_{22}	—	October 4, 2004	Kitt Peak	Spacewatch	·	1.5 km	MPC · JPL
377404	2004 TQ_{35}	—	October 4, 2004	Kitt Peak	Spacewatch	·	1.7 km	MPC · JPL
377405	2004 TY_{45}	—	October 4, 2004	Kitt Peak	Spacewatch	·	1.7 km	MPC · JPL
377406	2004 TF_{62}	—	October 5, 2004	Kitt Peak	Spacewatch	·	1.6 km	MPC · JPL
377407	2004 TA_{63}	—	September 17, 2004	Kitt Peak	Spacewatch	·	2.6 km	MPC · JPL
377408	2004 TA_{66}	—	October 5, 2004	Anderson Mesa	LONEOS	NEM	2.8 km	MPC · JPL
377409	2004 TS_{68}	—	October 5, 2004	Anderson Mesa	LONEOS	·	2.9 km	MPC · JPL
377410	2004 TB_{74}	—	October 6, 2004	Kitt Peak	Spacewatch	·	2.4 km	MPC · JPL
377411	2004 TE_{95}	—	October 5, 2004	Kitt Peak	Spacewatch	·	1.5 km	MPC · JPL
377412	2004 TP_{104}	—	September 17, 2004	Socorro	LINEAR	·	2.4 km	MPC · JPL
377413	2004 TU_{104}	—	October 7, 2004	Kitt Peak	Spacewatch	AEO	1.0 km	MPC · JPL
377414	2004 TA_{107}	—	October 7, 2004	Socorro	LINEAR	EUN	1.6 km	MPC · JPL
377415	2004 TZ_{112}	—	October 7, 2004	Palomar	NEAT	·	2.5 km	MPC · JPL
377416	2004 TH_{113}	—	October 7, 2004	Kitt Peak	Spacewatch	·	1.7 km	MPC · JPL
377417	2004 TX_{116}	—	October 4, 2004	Anderson Mesa	LONEOS	·	2.6 km	MPC · JPL
377418	2004 TZ_{122}	—	October 7, 2004	Anderson Mesa	LONEOS	·	1.7 km	MPC · JPL
377419	2004 TX_{127}	—	October 7, 2004	Socorro	LINEAR	·	1.9 km	MPC · JPL
377420	2004 TP_{132}	—	October 7, 2004	Palomar	NEAT	·	2.6 km	MPC · JPL
377421	2004 TU_{138}	—	September 13, 2004	Socorro	LINEAR	·	2.0 km	MPC · JPL
377422	2004 TR_{146}	—	October 6, 2004	Kitt Peak	Spacewatch	·	2.1 km	MPC · JPL
377423	2004 TT_{153}	—	October 6, 2004	Kitt Peak	Spacewatch	·	1.6 km	MPC · JPL
377424	2004 TW_{165}	—	September 13, 2004	Socorro	LINEAR	AEO	1.1 km	MPC · JPL
377425	2004 TL_{166}	—	October 7, 2004	Kitt Peak	Spacewatch	·	1.7 km	MPC · JPL
377426	2004 TF_{180}	—	October 7, 2004	Kitt Peak	Spacewatch	·	1.4 km	MPC · JPL
377427	2004 TQ_{187}	—	September 10, 2004	Kitt Peak	Spacewatch	·	1.6 km	MPC · JPL
377428	2004 TW_{198}	—	October 7, 2004	Kitt Peak	Spacewatch	HOF	2.5 km	MPC · JPL
377429	2004 TV_{202}	—	October 7, 2004	Kitt Peak	Spacewatch	·	2.0 km	MPC · JPL
377430	2004 TS_{203}	—	October 7, 2004	Kitt Peak	Spacewatch	·	2.2 km	MPC · JPL
377431	2004 TC_{205}	—	October 7, 2004	Kitt Peak	Spacewatch	AGN	1.2 km	MPC · JPL
377432	2004 TK_{214}	—	October 9, 2004	Kitt Peak	Spacewatch	·	1.7 km	MPC · JPL
377433	2004 TT_{218}	—	October 5, 2004	Palomar	NEAT	·	2.5 km	MPC · JPL
377434	2004 TM_{220}	—	May 2, 2003	Kitt Peak	Spacewatch	EUN	1.5 km	MPC · JPL
377435	2004 TM_{231}	—	October 8, 2004	Kitt Peak	Spacewatch	·	1.8 km	MPC · JPL
377436	2004 TH_{244}	—	September 18, 2004	Socorro	LINEAR	GEF	1.4 km	MPC · JPL
377437	2004 TH_{273}	—	October 9, 2004	Kitt Peak	Spacewatch	·	2.2 km	MPC · JPL
377438	2004 TC_{288}	—	October 9, 2004	Kitt Peak	Spacewatch	·	2.2 km	MPC · JPL
377439	2004 TW_{290}	—	October 10, 2004	Kitt Peak	Spacewatch	·	2.0 km	MPC · JPL
377440	2004 TK_{295}	—	October 10, 2004	Kitt Peak	Spacewatch	·	2.1 km	MPC · JPL
377441	2004 TX_{307}	—	October 10, 2004	Socorro	LINEAR	·	2.6 km	MPC · JPL
377442	2004 TM_{319}	—	October 7, 2004	Kitt Peak	Spacewatch	·	1.9 km	MPC · JPL
377443	2004 TJ_{323}	—	October 11, 2004	Kitt Peak	Spacewatch	·	2.6 km	MPC · JPL
377444	2004 TS_{323}	—	October 11, 2004	Kitt Peak	Spacewatch	HOF	2.8 km	MPC · JPL
377445	2004 TU_{338}	—	October 12, 2004	Kitt Peak	Spacewatch	EUN	1.4 km	MPC · JPL
377446	2004 TR_{345}	—	October 6, 2004	Kitt Peak	Spacewatch	·	2.2 km	MPC · JPL
377447	2004 TE_{359}	—	September 17, 1995	La Silla	C.-I. Lagerkvist	·	2.0 km	MPC · JPL
377448	2004 TK_{366}	—	October 9, 2004	Anderson Mesa	LONEOS	·	2.8 km	MPC · JPL
377449	2004 VW_{8}	—	November 3, 2004	Catalina	CSS	·	2.8 km	MPC · JPL
377450	2004 VG_{26}	—	November 4, 2004	Catalina	CSS	·	2.6 km	MPC · JPL
377451	2004 VK_{29}	—	November 3, 2004	Kitt Peak	Spacewatch	·	1.9 km	MPC · JPL
377452	2004 VF_{42}	—	October 15, 2004	Mount Lemmon	Mount Lemmon Survey	·	2.0 km	MPC · JPL
377453	2004 VR_{46}	—	November 4, 2004	Kitt Peak	Spacewatch	·	2.8 km	MPC · JPL
377454	2004 VT_{47}	—	November 4, 2004	Kitt Peak	Spacewatch	·	2.9 km	MPC · JPL
377455	2004 VG_{57}	—	November 5, 2004	Palomar	NEAT	·	2.4 km	MPC · JPL
377456	2004 VX_{73}	—	November 12, 2004	Catalina	CSS	·	2.0 km	MPC · JPL
377457	2004 VP_{79}	—	November 3, 2004	Kitt Peak	Spacewatch	·	1.7 km	MPC · JPL
377458	2004 VS_{91}	—	November 3, 2004	Palomar	NEAT	·	1.6 km	MPC · JPL
377459	2004 WW_{6}	—	November 19, 2004	Socorro	LINEAR	·	1.9 km	MPC · JPL
377460	2004 WN_{8}	—	November 19, 2004	Socorro	LINEAR	·	2.4 km	MPC · JPL
377461	2004 XZ_{10}	—	December 3, 2004	Kitt Peak	Spacewatch	·	2.9 km	MPC · JPL
377462	2004 XP_{32}	—	December 10, 2004	Socorro	LINEAR	·	2.6 km	MPC · JPL
377463	2004 XE_{45}	—	December 7, 2004	Socorro	LINEAR	·	2.2 km	MPC · JPL
377464	2004 XS_{76}	—	December 10, 2004	Socorro	LINEAR	·	3.0 km	MPC · JPL
377465	2004 XP_{80}	—	December 10, 2004	Socorro	LINEAR	·	2.5 km	MPC · JPL
377466	2004 XC_{105}	—	December 10, 2004	Kitt Peak	Spacewatch	GEF	1.7 km	MPC · JPL
377467	2004 XX_{106}	—	December 11, 2004	Socorro	LINEAR	·	2.8 km	MPC · JPL
377468	2004 XL_{107}	—	December 11, 2004	Socorro	LINEAR	·	2.4 km	MPC · JPL
377469	2004 XD_{108}	—	December 11, 2004	Socorro	LINEAR	·	2.3 km	MPC · JPL
377470	2004 XX_{161}	—	December 15, 2004	Socorro	LINEAR	·	3.0 km	MPC · JPL
377471	2004 YG_{16}	—	December 18, 2004	Mount Lemmon	Mount Lemmon Survey	L5	10 km	MPC · JPL
377472	2004 YG_{25}	—	December 18, 2004	Mount Lemmon	Mount Lemmon Survey	·	1.9 km	MPC · JPL
377473	2005 AQ	—	January 6, 2005	Pla D'Arguines	R. Ferrando	DOR	2.4 km	MPC · JPL
377474	2005 AW_{18}	—	December 19, 2004	Mount Lemmon	Mount Lemmon Survey	·	4.6 km	MPC · JPL
377475	2005 AA_{79}	—	January 15, 2005	Kitt Peak	Spacewatch	L5	10 km	MPC · JPL
377476	2005 AF_{79}	—	January 15, 2005	Kitt Peak	Spacewatch	·	800 m	MPC · JPL
377477	2005 BV_{33}	—	January 19, 2005	Kitt Peak	Spacewatch	·	680 m	MPC · JPL
377478	2005 CX_{9}	—	February 1, 2005	Kitt Peak	Spacewatch	·	620 m	MPC · JPL
377479	2005 CK_{47}	—	February 2, 2005	Kitt Peak	Spacewatch	·	4.7 km	MPC · JPL
377480	2005 CL_{50}	—	February 2, 2005	Socorro	LINEAR	·	4.4 km	MPC · JPL
377481	2005 CJ_{65}	—	February 9, 2005	Kitt Peak	Spacewatch	·	4.1 km	MPC · JPL
377482	2005 EK_{8}	—	March 1, 2005	Kitt Peak	Spacewatch	·	4.4 km	MPC · JPL
377483	2005 EW_{16}	—	March 3, 2005	Kitt Peak	Spacewatch	·	3.5 km	MPC · JPL
377484	2005 EW_{18}	—	March 3, 2005	Kitt Peak	Spacewatch	·	3.1 km	MPC · JPL
377485	2005 ED_{27}	—	March 1, 2005	Kitt Peak	Spacewatch	·	750 m	MPC · JPL
377486	2005 EB_{31}	—	March 1, 2005	Kitt Peak	Spacewatch	EOS	2.2 km	MPC · JPL
377487	2005 EX_{49}	—	March 3, 2005	Catalina	CSS	·	1.1 km	MPC · JPL
377488	2005 EY_{49}	—	March 3, 2005	Catalina	CSS	·	860 m	MPC · JPL
377489	2005 EY_{60}	—	March 4, 2005	Catalina	CSS	PHO	2.1 km	MPC · JPL
377490	2005 EM_{75}	—	March 3, 2005	Kitt Peak	Spacewatch	·	2.8 km	MPC · JPL
377491	2005 EK_{103}	—	March 4, 2005	Kitt Peak	Spacewatch	·	2.1 km	MPC · JPL
377492	2005 EB_{104}	—	March 4, 2005	Kitt Peak	Spacewatch	·	670 m	MPC · JPL
377493	2005 EK_{122}	—	March 8, 2005	Mount Lemmon	Mount Lemmon Survey	L5	8.5 km	MPC · JPL
377494	2005 EA_{144}	—	March 10, 2005	Mount Lemmon	Mount Lemmon Survey	·	770 m	MPC · JPL
377495	2005 EN_{144}	—	March 10, 2005	Mount Lemmon	Mount Lemmon Survey	EMA	3.4 km	MPC · JPL
377496	2005 EP_{145}	—	March 10, 2005	Mount Lemmon	Mount Lemmon Survey	·	1.8 km	MPC · JPL
377497	2005 EJ_{147}	—	March 10, 2005	Mount Lemmon	Mount Lemmon Survey	·	720 m	MPC · JPL
377498	2005 EC_{148}	—	March 10, 2005	Kitt Peak	Spacewatch	EOS	2.7 km	MPC · JPL
377499	2005 EW_{151}	—	March 10, 2005	Kitt Peak	Spacewatch	·	1.9 km	MPC · JPL
377500	2005 ET_{157}	—	March 9, 2005	Mount Lemmon	Mount Lemmon Survey	·	3.2 km	MPC · JPL

== 377501–377600 ==
back to top

Designation			Discovery			Properties		Ref
Permanent	Provisional	Named after	Date	Site	Discoverer(s)	Category	Diam.	Ref
377501	2005 ER_{158}	—	March 9, 2005	Mount Lemmon	Mount Lemmon Survey	·	2.3 km	MPC · JPL
377502	2005 EJ_{159}	—	March 9, 2005	Mount Lemmon	Mount Lemmon Survey	·	3.3 km	MPC · JPL
377503	2005 EE_{160}	—	March 9, 2005	Mount Lemmon	Mount Lemmon Survey	HYG	2.8 km	MPC · JPL
377504	2005 EY_{176}	—	March 8, 2005	Mount Lemmon	Mount Lemmon Survey	·	1.5 km	MPC · JPL
377505	2005 EJ_{179}	—	March 9, 2005	Kitt Peak	Spacewatch	·	3.9 km	MPC · JPL
377506	2005 EG_{183}	—	March 9, 2005	Mount Lemmon	Mount Lemmon Survey	·	1.5 km	MPC · JPL
377507	2005 EY_{212}	—	March 4, 2005	Mount Lemmon	Mount Lemmon Survey	EOS	2.0 km	MPC · JPL
377508	2005 EM_{219}	—	March 10, 2005	Mount Lemmon	Mount Lemmon Survey	·	710 m	MPC · JPL
377509	2005 EL_{239}	—	March 11, 2005	Kitt Peak	Spacewatch	·	4.7 km	MPC · JPL
377510	2005 EV_{254}	—	March 11, 2005	Mount Lemmon	Mount Lemmon Survey	·	2.6 km	MPC · JPL
377511	2005 EA_{255}	—	March 11, 2005	Mount Lemmon	Mount Lemmon Survey	EOS	2.1 km	MPC · JPL
377512	2005 EV_{295}	—	March 15, 2005	Catalina	CSS	EOS	2.7 km	MPC · JPL
377513	2005 EG_{314}	—	March 10, 2005	Kitt Peak	M. W. Buie	·	3.3 km	MPC · JPL
377514	2005 FB_{13}	—	March 18, 2005	Catalina	CSS	·	850 m	MPC · JPL
377515	2005 GD_{1}	—	April 2, 2005	Mayhill	Lowe, A.	·	720 m	MPC · JPL
377516	2005 GU_{6}	—	April 1, 2005	Kitt Peak	Spacewatch	(7605)	5.3 km	MPC · JPL
377517	2005 GR_{11}	—	April 1, 2005	Anderson Mesa	LONEOS	·	1.0 km	MPC · JPL
377518	2005 GD_{17}	—	March 11, 2005	Mount Lemmon	Mount Lemmon Survey	·	600 m	MPC · JPL
377519	2005 GP_{17}	—	April 2, 2005	Mount Lemmon	Mount Lemmon Survey	·	620 m	MPC · JPL
377520	2005 GO_{19}	—	April 2, 2005	Mount Lemmon	Mount Lemmon Survey	·	1.0 km	MPC · JPL
377521	2005 GD_{20}	—	April 2, 2005	Palomar	NEAT	PHO	830 m	MPC · JPL
377522	2005 GQ_{36}	—	April 2, 2005	Mount Lemmon	Mount Lemmon Survey	VER	2.3 km	MPC · JPL
377523	2005 GC_{52}	—	April 2, 2005	Mount Lemmon	Mount Lemmon Survey	·	3.0 km	MPC · JPL
377524	2005 GQ_{66}	—	April 2, 2005	Mount Lemmon	Mount Lemmon Survey	·	2.9 km	MPC · JPL
377525	2005 GJ_{74}	—	March 10, 2005	Catalina	CSS	·	1.0 km	MPC · JPL
377526	2005 GF_{78}	—	April 6, 2005	Catalina	CSS	·	1.1 km	MPC · JPL
377527	2005 GA_{89}	—	April 5, 2005	Palomar	NEAT	·	720 m	MPC · JPL
377528	2005 GE_{105}	—	April 10, 2005	Kitt Peak	Spacewatch	·	3.3 km	MPC · JPL
377529	2005 GG_{112}	—	April 6, 2005	Kitt Peak	Spacewatch	(883)	850 m	MPC · JPL
377530	2005 GD_{115}	—	April 10, 2005	Mount Lemmon	Mount Lemmon Survey	EOS	2.2 km	MPC · JPL
377531	2005 GC_{124}	—	April 9, 2005	Mount Lemmon	Mount Lemmon Survey	·	1.6 km	MPC · JPL
377532	2005 GH_{131}	—	April 10, 2005	Kitt Peak	Spacewatch	·	760 m	MPC · JPL
377533	2005 GB_{154}	—	April 2, 2005	Kitt Peak	Spacewatch	·	4.1 km	MPC · JPL
377534	2005 GQ_{155}	—	April 10, 2005	Mount Lemmon	Mount Lemmon Survey	HYG	4.4 km	MPC · JPL
377535	2005 GG_{158}	—	April 12, 2005	Kitt Peak	Spacewatch	·	4.0 km	MPC · JPL
377536	2005 GN_{162}	—	April 4, 2005	Catalina	CSS	·	4.3 km	MPC · JPL
377537	2005 GP_{172}	—	April 14, 2005	Kitt Peak	Spacewatch	NYS	890 m	MPC · JPL
377538	2005 GH_{178}	—	April 15, 2005	Kitt Peak	Spacewatch	·	2.9 km	MPC · JPL
377539	2005 GF_{181}	—	April 12, 2005	Kitt Peak	Spacewatch	·	2.9 km	MPC · JPL
377540	2005 GT_{200}	—	April 4, 2005	Mount Lemmon	Mount Lemmon Survey	·	3.1 km	MPC · JPL
377541	2005 GT_{202}	—	April 6, 2005	Mount Lemmon	Mount Lemmon Survey	·	710 m	MPC · JPL
377542	2005 GD_{206}	—	April 11, 2005	Kitt Peak	M. W. Buie	·	2.9 km	MPC · JPL
377543	2005 GA_{209}	—	April 2, 2005	Catalina	CSS	·	3.9 km	MPC · JPL
377544	2005 GQ_{217}	—	April 2, 2005	Kitt Peak	Spacewatch	·	4.3 km	MPC · JPL
377545	2005 HP_{6}	—	April 27, 2005	Campo Imperatore	CINEOS	PHO	1.2 km	MPC · JPL
377546	2005 HO_{10}	—	April 17, 2005	Kitt Peak	Spacewatch	·	2.9 km	MPC · JPL
377547	2005 JQ_{13}	—	May 4, 2005	Mauna Kea	Veillet, C.	V	530 m	MPC · JPL
377548	2005 JL_{16}	—	May 4, 2005	Mount Lemmon	Mount Lemmon Survey	TIR	3.1 km	MPC · JPL
377549	2005 JD_{24}	—	May 3, 2005	Kitt Peak	Spacewatch	EOS	2.4 km	MPC · JPL
377550	2005 JN_{35}	—	May 4, 2005	Kitt Peak	Spacewatch	·	2.6 km	MPC · JPL
377551	2005 JP_{43}	—	May 8, 2005	Kitt Peak	Spacewatch	·	4.4 km	MPC · JPL
377552	2005 JV_{47}	—	May 3, 2005	Kitt Peak	Spacewatch	EOS	2.8 km	MPC · JPL
377553	2005 JZ_{54}	—	May 4, 2005	Kitt Peak	Spacewatch	·	900 m	MPC · JPL
377554	2005 JM_{56}	—	May 6, 2005	Kitt Peak	Spacewatch	EUP	4.1 km	MPC · JPL
377555	2005 JE_{76}	—	May 9, 2005	Mount Lemmon	Mount Lemmon Survey	NYS	840 m	MPC · JPL
377556	2005 JR_{78}	—	April 11, 2005	Mount Lemmon	Mount Lemmon Survey	·	980 m	MPC · JPL
377557	2005 JD_{79}	—	May 10, 2005	Mount Lemmon	Mount Lemmon Survey	·	770 m	MPC · JPL
377558	2005 JO_{89}	—	May 11, 2005	Mount Lemmon	Mount Lemmon Survey	·	3.9 km	MPC · JPL
377559	2005 JF_{117}	—	May 10, 2005	Kitt Peak	Spacewatch	TIR	3.9 km	MPC · JPL
377560	2005 JT_{117}	—	May 10, 2005	Kitt Peak	Spacewatch	·	3.3 km	MPC · JPL
377561	2005 JR_{127}	—	May 12, 2005	Socorro	LINEAR	·	1.4 km	MPC · JPL
377562	2005 JG_{137}	—	May 13, 2005	Kitt Peak	Spacewatch	·	3.2 km	MPC · JPL
377563	2005 JE_{140}	—	May 14, 2005	Socorro	LINEAR	·	4.2 km	MPC · JPL
377564	2005 JQ_{149}	—	May 3, 2005	Kitt Peak	Spacewatch	·	700 m	MPC · JPL
377565	2005 JF_{152}	—	May 4, 2005	Mount Lemmon	Mount Lemmon Survey	EOS	5.0 km	MPC · JPL
377566	2005 KV_{7}	—	May 20, 2005	Mount Lemmon	Mount Lemmon Survey	·	4.4 km	MPC · JPL
377567	2005 LV_{4}	—	June 1, 2005	Kitt Peak	Spacewatch	·	3.8 km	MPC · JPL
377568	2005 LH_{7}	—	May 12, 2005	Socorro	LINEAR	·	990 m	MPC · JPL
377569	2005 LW_{17}	—	May 15, 2005	Mount Lemmon	Mount Lemmon Survey	·	980 m	MPC · JPL
377570	2005 LR_{18}	—	June 8, 2005	Kitt Peak	Spacewatch	·	3.8 km	MPC · JPL
377571	2005 LC_{20}	—	June 4, 2005	Kitt Peak	Spacewatch	(2076)	990 m	MPC · JPL
377572	2005 LA_{24}	—	June 9, 2005	Kitt Peak	Spacewatch	PHO	1.5 km	MPC · JPL
377573	2005 LH_{25}	—	June 8, 2005	Kitt Peak	Spacewatch	·	1.0 km	MPC · JPL
377574	2005 LU_{27}	—	June 9, 2005	Kitt Peak	Spacewatch	·	750 m	MPC · JPL
377575	2005 LB_{52}	—	June 15, 2005	Mount Lemmon	Mount Lemmon Survey	·	1.6 km	MPC · JPL
377576	2005 NB_{16}	—	July 2, 2005	Kitt Peak	Spacewatch	·	1.1 km	MPC · JPL
377577	2005 NN_{17}	—	July 3, 2005	Mount Lemmon	Mount Lemmon Survey	NYS	1.1 km	MPC · JPL
377578	2005 NJ_{21}	—	July 1, 2005	Kitt Peak	Spacewatch	·	1.2 km	MPC · JPL
377579	2005 NB_{29}	—	July 5, 2005	Palomar	NEAT	NYS	1.3 km	MPC · JPL
377580	2005 NC_{33}	—	July 5, 2005	Kitt Peak	Spacewatch	·	1.3 km	MPC · JPL
377581	2005 NL_{33}	—	July 5, 2005	Kitt Peak	Spacewatch	·	1.2 km	MPC · JPL
377582	2005 NE_{34}	—	July 5, 2005	Kitt Peak	Spacewatch	PHO	990 m	MPC · JPL
377583	2005 NP_{41}	—	July 4, 2005	Mount Lemmon	Mount Lemmon Survey	MAS	680 m	MPC · JPL
377584	2005 NH_{43}	—	July 5, 2005	Palomar	NEAT	·	930 m	MPC · JPL
377585	2005 NA_{46}	—	June 17, 2005	Mount Lemmon	Mount Lemmon Survey	MAS	690 m	MPC · JPL
377586	2005 NE_{79}	—	July 3, 2005	Mount Lemmon	Mount Lemmon Survey	·	1.2 km	MPC · JPL
377587	2005 NG_{85}	—	July 3, 2005	Mount Lemmon	Mount Lemmon Survey	·	1.0 km	MPC · JPL
377588	2005 NJ_{87}	—	July 3, 2005	Mount Lemmon	Mount Lemmon Survey	NYS	1.1 km	MPC · JPL
377589	2005 NB_{88}	—	July 4, 2005	Kitt Peak	Spacewatch	V	600 m	MPC · JPL
377590	2005 NG_{102}	—	July 15, 2005	Mount Lemmon	Mount Lemmon Survey	·	1.2 km	MPC · JPL
377591	2005 ON_{11}	—	July 28, 2005	Palomar	NEAT	PHO	1.1 km	MPC · JPL
377592	2005 OT_{12}	—	July 29, 2005	Palomar	NEAT	NYS	1.4 km	MPC · JPL
377593	2005 QV_{27}	—	August 27, 2005	Kitt Peak	Spacewatch	·	1.8 km	MPC · JPL
377594	2005 QM_{45}	—	August 26, 2005	Palomar	NEAT	·	1.2 km	MPC · JPL
377595	2005 QR_{53}	—	August 28, 2005	Kitt Peak	Spacewatch	NYS	1.3 km	MPC · JPL
377596	2005 QM_{65}	—	August 26, 2005	Siding Spring	SSS	PHO	1.8 km	MPC · JPL
377597	2005 QT_{70}	—	August 26, 2005	Anderson Mesa	LONEOS	T_{j} (2.96) · HIL	5.1 km	MPC · JPL
377598	2005 QW_{123}	—	August 28, 2005	Kitt Peak	Spacewatch	·	1.2 km	MPC · JPL
377599	2005 QL_{129}	—	August 28, 2005	Kitt Peak	Spacewatch	·	880 m	MPC · JPL
377600	2005 QU_{152}	—	August 26, 2005	Palomar	NEAT	·	1.7 km	MPC · JPL

== 377601–377700 ==
back to top

Designation			Discovery			Properties		Ref
Permanent	Provisional	Named after	Date	Site	Discoverer(s)	Category	Diam.	Ref
377601	2005 QB_{153}	—	August 26, 2005	Palomar	NEAT	·	1.8 km	MPC · JPL
377602	2005 QJ_{158}	—	August 26, 2005	Palomar	NEAT	·	1.4 km	MPC · JPL
377603	2005 QW_{160}	—	August 28, 2005	Kitt Peak	Spacewatch	·	830 m	MPC · JPL
377604	2005 QY_{164}	—	August 31, 2005	Palomar	NEAT	·	1.5 km	MPC · JPL
377605	2005 QV_{180}	—	August 29, 2005	Palomar	NEAT	PHO	1.3 km	MPC · JPL
377606	2005 RW_{2}	—	September 3, 2005	Palomar	NEAT	H	580 m	MPC · JPL
377607	2005 RU_{24}	—	September 11, 2005	Socorro	LINEAR	PHO	3.4 km	MPC · JPL
377608	2005 RB_{34}	—	September 14, 2005	Catalina	CSS	·	630 m	MPC · JPL
377609	2005 RC_{43}	—	September 14, 2005	Kitt Peak	Spacewatch	·	1.2 km	MPC · JPL
377610	2005 RU_{43}	—	September 1, 2005	Kitt Peak	Spacewatch	·	790 m	MPC · JPL
377611	2005 SJ_{7}	—	September 24, 2005	Kitt Peak	Spacewatch	H	550 m	MPC · JPL
377612	2005 SM_{8}	—	September 25, 2005	Catalina	CSS	H	630 m	MPC · JPL
377613	2005 SM_{27}	—	September 23, 2005	Kitt Peak	Spacewatch	·	1.4 km	MPC · JPL
377614	2005 SK_{51}	—	September 24, 2005	Kitt Peak	Spacewatch	·	960 m	MPC · JPL
377615	2005 SP_{53}	—	September 25, 2005	Kitt Peak	Spacewatch	MAR	880 m	MPC · JPL
377616	2005 SO_{70}	—	September 28, 2005	Palomar	NEAT	·	1.6 km	MPC · JPL
377617	2005 SS_{78}	—	September 24, 2005	Kitt Peak	Spacewatch	·	900 m	MPC · JPL
377618	2005 SP_{102}	—	September 25, 2005	Kitt Peak	Spacewatch	·	2.1 km	MPC · JPL
377619	2005 SE_{115}	—	September 27, 2005	Kitt Peak	Spacewatch	·	1.2 km	MPC · JPL
377620	2005 SB_{133}	—	September 29, 2005	Kitt Peak	Spacewatch	T_{j} (2.99) · HIL · 3:2	6.2 km	MPC · JPL
377621	2005 SY_{154}	—	September 26, 2005	Kitt Peak	Spacewatch	MAR	810 m	MPC · JPL
377622	2005 SC_{183}	—	September 29, 2005	Kitt Peak	Spacewatch	·	950 m	MPC · JPL
377623	2005 SZ_{203}	—	September 30, 2005	Mount Lemmon	Mount Lemmon Survey	NYS	1.0 km	MPC · JPL
377624	2005 SY_{206}	—	September 30, 2005	Anderson Mesa	LONEOS	·	1.6 km	MPC · JPL
377625	2005 SV_{223}	—	September 29, 2005	Mount Lemmon	Mount Lemmon Survey	·	1.0 km	MPC · JPL
377626	2005 SR_{238}	—	August 31, 2005	Kitt Peak	Spacewatch	3:2	6.0 km	MPC · JPL
377627	2005 SF_{245}	—	September 30, 2005	Mount Lemmon	Mount Lemmon Survey	V	470 m	MPC · JPL
377628	2005 SO_{252}	—	September 24, 2005	Palomar	NEAT	·	2.5 km	MPC · JPL
377629	2005 SY_{265}	—	September 29, 2005	Kitt Peak	Spacewatch	·	1.3 km	MPC · JPL
377630	2005 SF_{290}	—	September 29, 2005	Mount Lemmon	Mount Lemmon Survey	·	860 m	MPC · JPL
377631	2005 TJ_{16}	—	October 1, 2005	Kitt Peak	Spacewatch	·	880 m	MPC · JPL
377632	2005 TN_{25}	—	October 1, 2005	Mount Lemmon	Mount Lemmon Survey	·	2.4 km	MPC · JPL
377633	2005 TW_{51}	—	October 12, 2005	Altschwendt	W. Ries	H	590 m	MPC · JPL
377634	2005 TL_{52}	—	October 10, 2005	Catalina	CSS	H	770 m	MPC · JPL
377635	2005 TA_{58}	—	October 1, 2005	Mount Lemmon	Mount Lemmon Survey	·	1.0 km	MPC · JPL
377636	2005 TW_{62}	—	October 4, 2005	Mount Lemmon	Mount Lemmon Survey	·	1.5 km	MPC · JPL
377637	2005 TV_{75}	—	October 3, 2005	Catalina	CSS	·	2.4 km	MPC · JPL
377638	2005 TN_{94}	—	October 6, 2005	Kitt Peak	Spacewatch	·	1.5 km	MPC · JPL
377639	2005 TN_{102}	—	October 7, 2005	Mount Lemmon	Mount Lemmon Survey	·	1.0 km	MPC · JPL
377640	2005 TP_{124}	—	October 7, 2005	Kitt Peak	Spacewatch	·	820 m	MPC · JPL
377641	2005 UH_{64}	—	October 25, 2005	Catalina	CSS	(5)	2.1 km	MPC · JPL
377642	2005 US_{82}	—	October 22, 2005	Kitt Peak	Spacewatch	·	830 m	MPC · JPL
377643	2005 UT_{96}	—	October 22, 2005	Kitt Peak	Spacewatch	·	1.2 km	MPC · JPL
377644	2005 UM_{97}	—	October 22, 2005	Kitt Peak	Spacewatch	·	1.2 km	MPC · JPL
377645	2005 UM_{107}	—	October 22, 2005	Kitt Peak	Spacewatch	·	1.1 km	MPC · JPL
377646	2005 UH_{114}	—	October 22, 2005	Kitt Peak	Spacewatch	·	890 m	MPC · JPL
377647	2005 UF_{128}	—	October 24, 2005	Kitt Peak	Spacewatch	T_{j} (2.99) · 3:2	4.5 km	MPC · JPL
377648	2005 UD_{135}	—	October 25, 2005	Kitt Peak	Spacewatch	HIL · 3:2 · (6124)	7.0 km	MPC · JPL
377649	2005 UB_{136}	—	October 25, 2005	Mount Lemmon	Mount Lemmon Survey	·	760 m	MPC · JPL
377650	2005 UH_{136}	—	October 25, 2005	Mount Lemmon	Mount Lemmon Survey	·	1.1 km	MPC · JPL
377651	2005 UZ_{138}	—	October 25, 2005	Kitt Peak	Spacewatch	·	850 m	MPC · JPL
377652	2005 UK_{147}	—	October 26, 2005	Kitt Peak	Spacewatch	·	1.8 km	MPC · JPL
377653	2005 UE_{153}	—	October 26, 2005	Kitt Peak	Spacewatch	BRU	3.5 km	MPC · JPL
377654	2005 UV_{167}	—	October 24, 2005	Kitt Peak	Spacewatch	3:2 · SHU	4.3 km	MPC · JPL
377655	2005 UL_{169}	—	October 24, 2005	Kitt Peak	Spacewatch	·	910 m	MPC · JPL
377656	2005 UY_{175}	—	October 24, 2005	Kitt Peak	Spacewatch	·	1.6 km	MPC · JPL
377657	2005 UO_{202}	—	October 25, 2005	Kitt Peak	Spacewatch	·	1.1 km	MPC · JPL
377658	2005 UY_{221}	—	October 25, 2005	Kitt Peak	Spacewatch	·	860 m	MPC · JPL
377659	2005 UG_{222}	—	October 25, 2005	Kitt Peak	Spacewatch	·	2.0 km	MPC · JPL
377660	2005 UM_{225}	—	October 25, 2005	Kitt Peak	Spacewatch	·	1.2 km	MPC · JPL
377661	2005 UZ_{226}	—	October 25, 2005	Kitt Peak	Spacewatch	3:2	6.1 km	MPC · JPL
377662	2005 UZ_{231}	—	October 25, 2005	Mount Lemmon	Mount Lemmon Survey	·	1.5 km	MPC · JPL
377663	2005 UU_{234}	—	October 25, 2005	Kitt Peak	Spacewatch	·	1.9 km	MPC · JPL
377664	2005 UM_{252}	—	October 26, 2005	Kitt Peak	Spacewatch	·	1.9 km	MPC · JPL
377665	2005 UX_{254}	—	October 22, 2005	Catalina	CSS	3:2	6.6 km	MPC · JPL
377666	2005 UE_{260}	—	October 25, 2005	Kitt Peak	Spacewatch	·	590 m	MPC · JPL
377667	2005 UF_{271}	—	October 28, 2005	Socorro	LINEAR	H	760 m	MPC · JPL
377668	2005 UF_{274}	—	October 24, 2005	Palomar	NEAT	H	700 m	MPC · JPL
377669	2005 UM_{282}	—	October 26, 2005	Kitt Peak	Spacewatch	·	1.5 km	MPC · JPL
377670	2005 UM_{287}	—	October 26, 2005	Kitt Peak	Spacewatch	·	1.4 km	MPC · JPL
377671	2005 UU_{299}	—	October 26, 2005	Kitt Peak	Spacewatch	(5)	930 m	MPC · JPL
377672	2005 UM_{353}	—	October 29, 2005	Catalina	CSS	·	1.2 km	MPC · JPL
377673	2005 UG_{358}	—	October 24, 2005	Kitt Peak	Spacewatch	·	1.3 km	MPC · JPL
377674	2005 UD_{369}	—	October 27, 2005	Kitt Peak	Spacewatch	·	1.3 km	MPC · JPL
377675	2005 UU_{380}	—	October 30, 2005	Mount Lemmon	Mount Lemmon Survey	3:2 · SHU	4.5 km	MPC · JPL
377676	2005 UZ_{401}	—	October 27, 2005	Kitt Peak	Spacewatch	·	1.4 km	MPC · JPL
377677	2005 UU_{404}	—	October 29, 2005	Mount Lemmon	Mount Lemmon Survey	·	1.0 km	MPC · JPL
377678	2005 UD_{424}	—	October 28, 2005	Kitt Peak	Spacewatch	HIL · 3:2	5.3 km	MPC · JPL
377679	2005 UE_{431}	—	October 28, 2005	Kitt Peak	Spacewatch	(5)	960 m	MPC · JPL
377680	2005 UM_{440}	—	October 29, 2005	Catalina	CSS	·	3.8 km	MPC · JPL
377681	2005 UJ_{512}	—	October 29, 2005	Mount Lemmon	Mount Lemmon Survey	(5)	1.4 km	MPC · JPL
377682	2005 VJ	—	November 2, 2005	Lulin	Lulin	·	970 m	MPC · JPL
377683	2005 VC_{30}	—	November 4, 2005	Kitt Peak	Spacewatch	·	1.1 km	MPC · JPL
377684	2005 VE_{32}	—	November 4, 2005	Kitt Peak	Spacewatch	·	2.1 km	MPC · JPL
377685	2005 VR_{41}	—	November 4, 2005	Mount Lemmon	Mount Lemmon Survey	(5)	1.2 km	MPC · JPL
377686	2005 VZ_{45}	—	November 4, 2005	Kitt Peak	Spacewatch	·	1 km	MPC · JPL
377687	2005 VH_{65}	—	November 1, 2005	Mount Lemmon	Mount Lemmon Survey	KON	2.2 km	MPC · JPL
377688	2005 VY_{67}	—	November 1, 2005	Mount Lemmon	Mount Lemmon Survey	·	1.1 km	MPC · JPL
377689	2005 VG_{94}	—	November 6, 2005	Mount Lemmon	Mount Lemmon Survey	·	1.7 km	MPC · JPL
377690	2005 VS_{97}	—	November 5, 2005	Kitt Peak	Spacewatch	·	1.5 km	MPC · JPL
377691	2005 VG_{107}	—	November 5, 2005	Kitt Peak	Spacewatch	·	1.2 km	MPC · JPL
377692	2005 VU_{112}	—	November 9, 2005	Campo Imperatore	CINEOS	·	1.3 km	MPC · JPL
377693	2005 VE_{119}	—	November 4, 2005	Mount Lemmon	Mount Lemmon Survey	·	1.3 km	MPC · JPL
377694	2005 VZ_{119}	—	November 6, 2005	Mount Lemmon	Mount Lemmon Survey	·	2.2 km	MPC · JPL
377695	2005 VF_{134}	—	November 1, 2005	Kitt Peak	Spacewatch	·	1.3 km	MPC · JPL
377696	2005 WF_{1}	—	November 21, 2005	Palomar	NEAT	H	780 m	MPC · JPL
377697	2005 WL_{1}	—	November 21, 2005	Socorro	LINEAR	H	690 m	MPC · JPL
377698	2005 WJ_{9}	—	October 31, 2005	Kitt Peak	Spacewatch	·	1.2 km	MPC · JPL
377699	2005 WG_{16}	—	November 22, 2005	Kitt Peak	Spacewatch	·	2.5 km	MPC · JPL
377700	2005 WC_{18}	—	November 22, 2005	Kitt Peak	Spacewatch	·	1.4 km	MPC · JPL

== 377701–377800 ==
back to top

Designation			Discovery			Properties		Ref
Permanent	Provisional	Named after	Date	Site	Discoverer(s)	Category	Diam.	Ref
377701	2005 WU_{19}	—	November 21, 2005	Kitt Peak	Spacewatch	·	940 m	MPC · JPL
377702	2005 WC_{22}	—	November 21, 2005	Kitt Peak	Spacewatch	·	1.1 km	MPC · JPL
377703	2005 WW_{24}	—	November 21, 2005	Kitt Peak	Spacewatch	·	1.5 km	MPC · JPL
377704	2005 WZ_{32}	—	November 21, 2005	Kitt Peak	Spacewatch	(5)	1.2 km	MPC · JPL
377705	2005 WG_{33}	—	November 21, 2005	Kitt Peak	Spacewatch	EUN	1.6 km	MPC · JPL
377706	2005 WD_{44}	—	November 21, 2005	Kitt Peak	Spacewatch	·	2.8 km	MPC · JPL
377707	2005 WN_{54}	—	November 25, 2005	Kitt Peak	Spacewatch	H	680 m	MPC · JPL
377708	2005 WW_{56}	—	November 29, 2005	Junk Bond	D. Healy	·	1.0 km	MPC · JPL
377709	2005 WL_{76}	—	November 25, 2005	Kitt Peak	Spacewatch	·	1.6 km	MPC · JPL
377710	2005 WL_{82}	—	November 25, 2005	Mount Lemmon	Mount Lemmon Survey	H	630 m	MPC · JPL
377711	2005 WP_{88}	—	November 22, 2005	Kitt Peak	Spacewatch	·	1.8 km	MPC · JPL
377712	2005 WU_{96}	—	November 26, 2005	Kitt Peak	Spacewatch	(5)	1.2 km	MPC · JPL
377713	2005 WE_{99}	—	November 28, 2005	Mount Lemmon	Mount Lemmon Survey	MAR	1.5 km	MPC · JPL
377714	2005 WK_{101}	—	November 29, 2005	Mount Lemmon	Mount Lemmon Survey	·	960 m	MPC · JPL
377715	2005 WV_{101}	—	November 29, 2005	Socorro	LINEAR	·	2.2 km	MPC · JPL
377716	2005 WU_{109}	—	November 30, 2005	Kitt Peak	Spacewatch	·	1.2 km	MPC · JPL
377717	2005 WD_{111}	—	November 30, 2005	Kitt Peak	Spacewatch	·	1.6 km	MPC · JPL
377718	2005 WE_{120}	—	November 29, 2005	Socorro	LINEAR	HNS	1.4 km	MPC · JPL
377719	2005 WB_{122}	—	November 30, 2005	Mount Lemmon	Mount Lemmon Survey	·	3.9 km	MPC · JPL
377720	2005 WD_{129}	—	November 4, 2005	Kitt Peak	Spacewatch	·	1.9 km	MPC · JPL
377721	2005 WS_{143}	—	November 30, 2005	Kitt Peak	Spacewatch	·	1.3 km	MPC · JPL
377722	2005 WC_{148}	—	November 26, 2005	Socorro	LINEAR	·	2.2 km	MPC · JPL
377723	2005 WJ_{150}	—	November 28, 2005	Socorro	LINEAR	T_{j} (2.97) · 3:2	6.2 km	MPC · JPL
377724	2005 WZ_{162}	—	November 28, 2005	Mount Lemmon	Mount Lemmon Survey	(5)	1.3 km	MPC · JPL
377725	2005 WL_{177}	—	November 30, 2005	Kitt Peak	Spacewatch	·	1.7 km	MPC · JPL
377726	2005 WR_{179}	—	November 21, 2005	Catalina	CSS	KON	3.1 km	MPC · JPL
377727	2005 WR_{180}	—	November 22, 2005	Catalina	CSS	H	570 m	MPC · JPL
377728	2005 WQ_{183}	—	November 28, 2005	Socorro	LINEAR	·	1.6 km	MPC · JPL
377729	2005 WQ_{211}	—	November 30, 2005	Kitt Peak	Spacewatch	·	1.2 km	MPC · JPL
377730	2005 XF_{1}	—	December 2, 2005	Socorro	LINEAR	H	690 m	MPC · JPL
377731	2005 XR_{3}	—	December 1, 2005	Socorro	LINEAR	·	1.1 km	MPC · JPL
377732	2005 XJ_{8}	—	December 4, 2005	Catalina	CSS	APO +1km · PHA	990 m	MPC · JPL
377733	2005 XQ_{15}	—	November 22, 2005	Kitt Peak	Spacewatch	·	920 m	MPC · JPL
377734	2005 XB_{20}	—	December 2, 2005	Kitt Peak	Spacewatch	·	2.2 km	MPC · JPL
377735	2005 XH_{21}	—	December 2, 2005	Kitt Peak	Spacewatch	·	2.5 km	MPC · JPL
377736	2005 XX_{21}	—	December 2, 2005	Socorro	LINEAR	·	1.4 km	MPC · JPL
377737	2005 XZ_{25}	—	December 4, 2005	Socorro	LINEAR	·	1.5 km	MPC · JPL
377738	2005 XW_{28}	—	December 2, 2005	Socorro	LINEAR	·	3.1 km	MPC · JPL
377739	2005 XB_{33}	—	November 22, 2005	Kitt Peak	Spacewatch	·	1.4 km	MPC · JPL
377740	2005 XY_{36}	—	December 4, 2005	Kitt Peak	Spacewatch	·	1.6 km	MPC · JPL
377741	2005 XZ_{52}	—	December 2, 2005	Kitt Peak	Spacewatch	·	2.3 km	MPC · JPL
377742	2005 XG_{61}	—	December 4, 2005	Mount Lemmon	Mount Lemmon Survey	·	1.2 km	MPC · JPL
377743	2005 XF_{62}	—	December 5, 2005	Kitt Peak	Spacewatch	HNS	1.5 km	MPC · JPL
377744	2005 XM_{68}	—	December 6, 2005	Kitt Peak	Spacewatch	·	1.2 km	MPC · JPL
377745	2005 XY_{77}	—	December 10, 2005	Catalina	CSS	·	1.5 km	MPC · JPL
377746	2005 XV_{81}	—	December 7, 2005	Kitt Peak	Spacewatch	·	1.5 km	MPC · JPL
377747	2005 XN_{105}	—	December 1, 2005	Kitt Peak	M. W. Buie	·	1.5 km	MPC · JPL
377748	2005 XA_{118}	—	December 5, 2005	Mount Lemmon	Mount Lemmon Survey	·	2.6 km	MPC · JPL
377749	2005 YV_{5}	—	December 21, 2005	Kitt Peak	Spacewatch	·	1.2 km	MPC · JPL
377750	2005 YA_{13}	—	December 22, 2005	Kitt Peak	Spacewatch	·	1.0 km	MPC · JPL
377751	2005 YT_{14}	—	December 22, 2005	Kitt Peak	Spacewatch	·	1.6 km	MPC · JPL
377752	2005 YG_{15}	—	December 22, 2005	Kitt Peak	Spacewatch	·	2.5 km	MPC · JPL
377753	2005 YM_{15}	—	December 22, 2005	Kitt Peak	Spacewatch	·	1.5 km	MPC · JPL
377754	2005 YQ_{16}	—	December 22, 2005	Kitt Peak	Spacewatch	·	1.2 km	MPC · JPL
377755	2005 YG_{25}	—	December 24, 2005	Kitt Peak	Spacewatch	(5)	980 m	MPC · JPL
377756	2005 YX_{32}	—	December 22, 2005	Kitt Peak	Spacewatch	·	1.3 km	MPC · JPL
377757	2005 YL_{33}	—	December 24, 2005	Kitt Peak	Spacewatch	·	1.1 km	MPC · JPL
377758	2005 YT_{47}	—	December 26, 2005	Catalina	CSS	·	1.6 km	MPC · JPL
377759	2005 YF_{48}	—	December 22, 2005	Kitt Peak	Spacewatch	·	1.4 km	MPC · JPL
377760	2005 YN_{55}	—	December 25, 2005	Kitt Peak	Spacewatch	·	1.1 km	MPC · JPL
377761	2005 YO_{60}	—	December 22, 2005	Kitt Peak	Spacewatch	·	1.4 km	MPC · JPL
377762	2005 YQ_{60}	—	December 22, 2005	Kitt Peak	Spacewatch	T_{j} (2.99) · 3:2	4.8 km	MPC · JPL
377763	2005 YH_{70}	—	December 26, 2005	Kitt Peak	Spacewatch	·	2.4 km	MPC · JPL
377764	2005 YK_{79}	—	December 24, 2005	Kitt Peak	Spacewatch	·	1.4 km	MPC · JPL
377765	2005 YH_{87}	—	December 21, 2005	Junk Bond	D. Healy	·	1.3 km	MPC · JPL
377766	2005 YK_{114}	—	December 25, 2005	Kitt Peak	Spacewatch	·	2.8 km	MPC · JPL
377767	2005 YX_{118}	—	December 26, 2005	Mount Lemmon	Mount Lemmon Survey	(5)	1.3 km	MPC · JPL
377768	2005 YC_{124}	—	December 25, 2005	Kitt Peak	Spacewatch	·	1.6 km	MPC · JPL
377769	2005 YN_{129}	—	December 24, 2005	Kitt Peak	Spacewatch	·	1.2 km	MPC · JPL
377770	2005 YQ_{130}	—	December 25, 2005	Mount Lemmon	Mount Lemmon Survey	·	1.7 km	MPC · JPL
377771	2005 YR_{135}	—	December 26, 2005	Kitt Peak	Spacewatch	·	1.6 km	MPC · JPL
377772	2005 YV_{160}	—	December 27, 2005	Kitt Peak	Spacewatch	·	2.0 km	MPC · JPL
377773	2005 YO_{168}	—	December 29, 2005	Kitt Peak	Spacewatch	(5)	1.4 km	MPC · JPL
377774	2005 YO_{171}	—	December 7, 2005	Catalina	CSS	·	2.3 km	MPC · JPL
377775	2005 YR_{178}	—	December 25, 2005	Kitt Peak	Spacewatch	·	1.8 km	MPC · JPL
377776	2005 YG_{185}	—	December 27, 2005	Kitt Peak	Spacewatch	EUN	1.4 km	MPC · JPL
377777	2005 YA_{186}	—	December 6, 2005	Mount Lemmon	Mount Lemmon Survey	·	2.0 km	MPC · JPL
377778	2005 YS_{200}	—	December 22, 2005	Kitt Peak	Spacewatch	·	2.9 km	MPC · JPL
377779	2005 YG_{211}	—	December 25, 2005	Catalina	CSS	·	2.9 km	MPC · JPL
377780	2005 YQ_{218}	—	December 30, 2005	Mount Lemmon	Mount Lemmon Survey	·	1.5 km	MPC · JPL
377781	2005 YU_{224}	—	December 25, 2005	Kitt Peak	Spacewatch	·	1.9 km	MPC · JPL
377782	2005 YD_{228}	—	December 25, 2005	Kitt Peak	Spacewatch	·	2.0 km	MPC · JPL
377783	2005 YC_{251}	—	December 28, 2005	Kitt Peak	Spacewatch	·	1.3 km	MPC · JPL
377784	2005 YL_{263}	—	December 25, 2005	Kitt Peak	Spacewatch	·	1.3 km	MPC · JPL
377785	2005 YL_{271}	—	December 28, 2005	Kitt Peak	Spacewatch	·	1.8 km	MPC · JPL
377786	2005 YD_{272}	—	December 29, 2005	Kitt Peak	Spacewatch	·	1.3 km	MPC · JPL
377787	2005 YK_{287}	—	December 30, 2005	Anderson Mesa	LONEOS	·	2.4 km	MPC · JPL
377788	2006 AB_{1}	—	January 2, 2006	Mount Lemmon	Mount Lemmon Survey	·	1.3 km	MPC · JPL
377789	2006 AV_{11}	—	January 4, 2006	Kitt Peak	Spacewatch	·	1.3 km	MPC · JPL
377790	2006 AF_{15}	—	January 5, 2006	Mount Lemmon	Mount Lemmon Survey	·	2.6 km	MPC · JPL
377791	2006 AW_{20}	—	January 5, 2006	Catalina	CSS	·	2.2 km	MPC · JPL
377792	2006 AY_{21}	—	January 5, 2006	Catalina	CSS	·	2.4 km	MPC · JPL
377793	2006 AY_{23}	—	January 4, 2006	Catalina	CSS	·	1.1 km	MPC · JPL
377794	2006 AM_{25}	—	January 5, 2006	Kitt Peak	Spacewatch	·	1.3 km	MPC · JPL
377795	2006 AM_{27}	—	January 5, 2006	Kitt Peak	Spacewatch	·	1.4 km	MPC · JPL
377796	2006 AW_{32}	—	January 5, 2006	Catalina	CSS	·	1.7 km	MPC · JPL
377797	2006 AQ_{35}	—	January 4, 2006	Mount Lemmon	Mount Lemmon Survey	·	2.0 km	MPC · JPL
377798	2006 AP_{42}	—	January 6, 2006	Kitt Peak	Spacewatch	MIS	2.0 km	MPC · JPL
377799	2006 AJ_{55}	—	January 5, 2006	Kitt Peak	Spacewatch	·	2.3 km	MPC · JPL
377800	2006 AZ_{57}	—	January 8, 2006	Mount Lemmon	Mount Lemmon Survey	·	3.0 km	MPC · JPL

== 377801–377900 ==
back to top

Designation			Discovery			Properties		Ref
Permanent	Provisional	Named after	Date	Site	Discoverer(s)	Category	Diam.	Ref
377801	2006 AN_{62}	—	January 6, 2006	Kitt Peak	Spacewatch	·	1.6 km	MPC · JPL
377802	2006 AG_{67}	—	January 9, 2006	Kitt Peak	Spacewatch	·	1.4 km	MPC · JPL
377803	2006 AH_{67}	—	January 9, 2006	Kitt Peak	Spacewatch	(5)	1.1 km	MPC · JPL
377804	2006 AW_{70}	—	January 6, 2006	Kitt Peak	Spacewatch	·	1.6 km	MPC · JPL
377805	2006 AL_{72}	—	January 6, 2006	Mount Lemmon	Mount Lemmon Survey	·	1.7 km	MPC · JPL
377806	2006 AN_{77}	—	January 6, 2006	Mount Lemmon	Mount Lemmon Survey	·	2.3 km	MPC · JPL
377807	2006 AG_{82}	—	January 3, 2006	Socorro	LINEAR	EUN	1.7 km	MPC · JPL
377808	2006 AN_{102}	—	January 8, 2006	Mount Lemmon	Mount Lemmon Survey	·	3.0 km	MPC · JPL
377809	2006 BX_{4}	—	January 21, 2006	Kitt Peak	Spacewatch	·	2.1 km	MPC · JPL
377810	2006 BN_{9}	—	January 22, 2006	Anderson Mesa	LONEOS	(5)	1.3 km	MPC · JPL
377811	2006 BM_{12}	—	January 21, 2006	Kitt Peak	Spacewatch	JUN	1.2 km	MPC · JPL
377812	2006 BH_{13}	—	January 4, 2006	Mount Lemmon	Mount Lemmon Survey	·	2.3 km	MPC · JPL
377813	2006 BO_{15}	—	January 22, 2006	Mount Lemmon	Mount Lemmon Survey	·	1.5 km	MPC · JPL
377814	2006 BB_{31}	—	January 20, 2006	Kitt Peak	Spacewatch	·	1.1 km	MPC · JPL
377815	2006 BA_{37}	—	January 23, 2006	Catalina	CSS	·	1.9 km	MPC · JPL
377816	2006 BE_{51}	—	January 25, 2006	Kitt Peak	Spacewatch	·	2.0 km	MPC · JPL
377817	2006 BD_{68}	—	January 23, 2006	Kitt Peak	Spacewatch	·	1.4 km	MPC · JPL
377818	2006 BN_{74}	—	January 23, 2006	Kitt Peak	Spacewatch	·	2.2 km	MPC · JPL
377819	2006 BB_{75}	—	January 23, 2006	Kitt Peak	Spacewatch	·	1.9 km	MPC · JPL
377820	2006 BP_{80}	—	January 23, 2006	Kitt Peak	Spacewatch	WIT	1.2 km	MPC · JPL
377821	2006 BZ_{84}	—	March 5, 2002	Kitt Peak	Spacewatch	·	1.2 km	MPC · JPL
377822	2006 BM_{85}	—	January 25, 2006	Kitt Peak	Spacewatch	MIS	2.5 km	MPC · JPL
377823	2006 BS_{86}	—	January 25, 2006	Kitt Peak	Spacewatch	HOF	2.9 km	MPC · JPL
377824	2006 BA_{94}	—	January 26, 2006	Kitt Peak	Spacewatch	·	2.4 km	MPC · JPL
377825	2006 BW_{99}	—	January 22, 2006	Catalina	CSS	ADE	2.2 km	MPC · JPL
377826	2006 BA_{101}	—	January 23, 2006	Kitt Peak	Spacewatch	·	1.2 km	MPC · JPL
377827	2006 BM_{102}	—	January 23, 2006	Mount Lemmon	Mount Lemmon Survey	·	1.9 km	MPC · JPL
377828	2006 BC_{104}	—	January 24, 2006	Kitt Peak	Spacewatch	(5)	1.5 km	MPC · JPL
377829	2006 BL_{109}	—	January 25, 2006	Kitt Peak	Spacewatch	·	3.4 km	MPC · JPL
377830	2006 BD_{111}	—	January 25, 2006	Kitt Peak	Spacewatch	·	2.2 km	MPC · JPL
377831	2006 BU_{112}	—	January 25, 2006	Kitt Peak	Spacewatch	·	1.9 km	MPC · JPL
377832	2006 BR_{113}	—	January 25, 2006	Kitt Peak	Spacewatch	MIS	1.8 km	MPC · JPL
377833	2006 BY_{116}	—	January 26, 2006	Kitt Peak	Spacewatch	MRX	1.1 km	MPC · JPL
377834	2006 BT_{119}	—	January 26, 2006	Kitt Peak	Spacewatch	·	3.2 km	MPC · JPL
377835	2006 BU_{120}	—	January 26, 2006	Kitt Peak	Spacewatch	MRX	1.2 km	MPC · JPL
377836	2006 BS_{122}	—	January 26, 2006	Kitt Peak	Spacewatch	AGN	1.3 km	MPC · JPL
377837	2006 BL_{125}	—	January 26, 2006	Kitt Peak	Spacewatch	·	2.4 km	MPC · JPL
377838	2006 BL_{142}	—	January 26, 2006	Mount Lemmon	Mount Lemmon Survey	MRX	1.2 km	MPC · JPL
377839	2006 BQ_{142}	—	January 26, 2006	Mount Lemmon	Mount Lemmon Survey	(13314)	3.7 km	MPC · JPL
377840	2006 BU_{148}	—	January 22, 2006	Mount Lemmon	Mount Lemmon Survey	·	3.3 km	MPC · JPL
377841	2006 BG_{152}	—	January 25, 2006	Kitt Peak	Spacewatch	·	2.1 km	MPC · JPL
377842	2006 BC_{166}	—	January 26, 2006	Mount Lemmon	Mount Lemmon Survey	(5)	1.3 km	MPC · JPL
377843	2006 BL_{167}	—	January 26, 2006	Mount Lemmon	Mount Lemmon Survey	(5)	1.2 km	MPC · JPL
377844	2006 BR_{169}	—	January 26, 2006	Mount Lemmon	Mount Lemmon Survey	L5	8.5 km	MPC · JPL
377845	2006 BV_{173}	—	January 27, 2006	Mount Lemmon	Mount Lemmon Survey	·	1.7 km	MPC · JPL
377846	2006 BP_{174}	—	January 27, 2006	Kitt Peak	Spacewatch	·	2.7 km	MPC · JPL
377847	2006 BF_{178}	—	January 27, 2006	Mount Lemmon	Mount Lemmon Survey	NEM	2.0 km	MPC · JPL
377848	2006 BX_{197}	—	January 30, 2006	Kitt Peak	Spacewatch	·	2.1 km	MPC · JPL
377849	2006 BB_{198}	—	September 18, 2003	Kitt Peak	Spacewatch	·	2.2 km	MPC · JPL
377850	2006 BU_{198}	—	January 30, 2006	Catalina	CSS	·	2.8 km	MPC · JPL
377851	2006 BQ_{199}	—	January 30, 2006	Kitt Peak	Spacewatch	L5	7.8 km	MPC · JPL
377852	2006 BU_{199}	—	January 30, 2006	Kitt Peak	Spacewatch	HOF	2.4 km	MPC · JPL
377853	2006 BL_{200}	—	January 31, 2006	Kitt Peak	Spacewatch	·	2.1 km	MPC · JPL
377854	2006 BF_{204}	—	January 31, 2006	Kitt Peak	Spacewatch	·	1.7 km	MPC · JPL
377855	2006 BP_{211}	—	January 31, 2006	Kitt Peak	Spacewatch	·	2.2 km	MPC · JPL
377856	2006 BG_{216}	—	January 26, 2006	Anderson Mesa	LONEOS	·	2.8 km	MPC · JPL
377857	2006 BP_{221}	—	January 30, 2006	Kitt Peak	Spacewatch	·	2.2 km	MPC · JPL
377858	2006 BS_{223}	—	January 30, 2006	Kitt Peak	Spacewatch	·	2.5 km	MPC · JPL
377859	2006 BJ_{232}	—	January 23, 2006	Kitt Peak	Spacewatch	·	2.2 km	MPC · JPL
377860	2006 BC_{238}	—	January 31, 2006	Kitt Peak	Spacewatch	·	1.5 km	MPC · JPL
377861	2006 BB_{242}	—	January 31, 2006	Kitt Peak	Spacewatch	·	1.5 km	MPC · JPL
377862	2006 BV_{244}	—	January 31, 2006	Kitt Peak	Spacewatch	·	1.7 km	MPC · JPL
377863	2006 BC_{251}	—	January 31, 2006	Mount Lemmon	Mount Lemmon Survey	·	1.6 km	MPC · JPL
377864	2006 BZ_{254}	—	January 31, 2006	Kitt Peak	Spacewatch	AGN	1.2 km	MPC · JPL
377865	2006 BK_{259}	—	January 31, 2006	Kitt Peak	Spacewatch	·	1.9 km	MPC · JPL
377866	2006 BS_{277}	—	January 28, 2006	Mount Lemmon	Mount Lemmon Survey	·	1.7 km	MPC · JPL
377867	2006 BE_{284}	—	January 31, 2006	Kitt Peak	Spacewatch	L5	7.6 km	MPC · JPL
377868	2006 CG_{21}	—	February 1, 2006	Catalina	CSS	·	3.0 km	MPC · JPL
377869	2006 CQ_{21}	—	February 1, 2006	Catalina	CSS	·	3.0 km	MPC · JPL
377870	2006 CN_{23}	—	February 2, 2006	Kitt Peak	Spacewatch	·	1.4 km	MPC · JPL
377871	2006 CU_{40}	—	February 2, 2006	Mount Lemmon	Mount Lemmon Survey	·	1.7 km	MPC · JPL
377872	2006 CB_{47}	—	February 3, 2006	Kitt Peak	Spacewatch	·	1.7 km	MPC · JPL
377873	2006 CL_{54}	—	January 5, 2006	Mount Lemmon	Mount Lemmon Survey	·	1.7 km	MPC · JPL
377874	2006 CY_{68}	—	February 1, 2006	Kitt Peak	Spacewatch	·	1.6 km	MPC · JPL
377875	2006 DV_{8}	—	February 21, 2006	Catalina	CSS	·	2.2 km	MPC · JPL
377876	2006 DB_{18}	—	February 20, 2006	Kitt Peak	Spacewatch	·	1.8 km	MPC · JPL
377877	2006 DW_{18}	—	February 20, 2006	Kitt Peak	Spacewatch	·	2.2 km	MPC · JPL
377878	2006 DQ_{19}	—	February 20, 2006	Kitt Peak	Spacewatch	·	3.1 km	MPC · JPL
377879	2006 DJ_{20}	—	October 9, 2004	Kitt Peak	Spacewatch	·	2.0 km	MPC · JPL
377880	2006 DM_{25}	—	February 20, 2006	Kitt Peak	Spacewatch	AST	1.7 km	MPC · JPL
377881	2006 DK_{32}	—	February 20, 2006	Mount Lemmon	Mount Lemmon Survey	·	2.2 km	MPC · JPL
377882	2006 DL_{36}	—	February 20, 2006	Mount Lemmon	Mount Lemmon Survey	GEF	1.6 km	MPC · JPL
377883	2006 DY_{36}	—	February 20, 2006	Kitt Peak	Spacewatch	·	1.5 km	MPC · JPL
377884	2006 DH_{39}	—	February 21, 2006	Mount Lemmon	Mount Lemmon Survey	AGN	1.4 km	MPC · JPL
377885	2006 DJ_{42}	—	February 20, 2006	Kitt Peak	Spacewatch	·	520 m	MPC · JPL
377886	2006 DO_{43}	—	February 20, 2006	Kitt Peak	Spacewatch	·	1.4 km	MPC · JPL
377887	2006 DA_{49}	—	February 21, 2006	Mount Lemmon	Mount Lemmon Survey	AGN	1.2 km	MPC · JPL
377888	2006 DN_{56}	—	February 24, 2006	Mount Lemmon	Mount Lemmon Survey	·	2.1 km	MPC · JPL
377889	2006 DD_{67}	—	February 22, 2006	Palomar	NEAT	·	1.7 km	MPC · JPL
377890	2006 DN_{68}	—	February 25, 2006	Socorro	LINEAR	·	3.1 km	MPC · JPL
377891	2006 DF_{69}	—	February 20, 2006	Catalina	CSS	·	1.9 km	MPC · JPL
377892	2006 DK_{74}	—	February 24, 2006	Kitt Peak	Spacewatch	·	1.5 km	MPC · JPL
377893	2006 DB_{76}	—	February 24, 2006	Kitt Peak	Spacewatch	·	2.2 km	MPC · JPL
377894	2006 DZ_{78}	—	February 24, 2006	Kitt Peak	Spacewatch	·	2.8 km	MPC · JPL
377895	2006 DT_{87}	—	February 24, 2006	Kitt Peak	Spacewatch	KOR	1.5 km	MPC · JPL
377896	2006 DD_{89}	—	February 24, 2006	Kitt Peak	Spacewatch	·	2.0 km	MPC · JPL
377897	2006 DZ_{92}	—	February 24, 2006	Kitt Peak	Spacewatch	·	1.7 km	MPC · JPL
377898	2006 DJ_{94}	—	February 24, 2006	Kitt Peak	Spacewatch	·	3.5 km	MPC · JPL
377899	2006 DD_{106}	—	February 25, 2006	Mount Lemmon	Mount Lemmon Survey	·	2.2 km	MPC · JPL
377900	2006 DQ_{106}	—	February 25, 2006	Mount Lemmon	Mount Lemmon Survey	·	1.9 km	MPC · JPL

== 377901–378000 ==
back to top

Designation			Discovery			Properties		Ref
Permanent	Provisional	Named after	Date	Site	Discoverer(s)	Category	Diam.	Ref
377901	2006 DN_{108}	—	February 25, 2006	Kitt Peak	Spacewatch	T_{j} (2.96)	4.1 km	MPC · JPL
377902	2006 DR_{117}	—	February 27, 2006	Kitt Peak	Spacewatch	·	2.6 km	MPC · JPL
377903	2006 DR_{118}	—	February 28, 2006	Mount Lemmon	Mount Lemmon Survey	L5	9.5 km	MPC · JPL
377904	2006 DW_{120}	—	February 22, 2006	Catalina	CSS	·	2.4 km	MPC · JPL
377905	2006 DL_{150}	—	February 25, 2006	Kitt Peak	Spacewatch	AGN	1.3 km	MPC · JPL
377906	2006 DZ_{163}	—	February 27, 2006	Mount Lemmon	Mount Lemmon Survey	·	2.4 km	MPC · JPL
377907	2006 DL_{167}	—	February 27, 2006	Kitt Peak	Spacewatch	·	2.6 km	MPC · JPL
377908	2006 DQ_{174}	—	February 27, 2006	Kitt Peak	Spacewatch	AGN	1.3 km	MPC · JPL
377909	2006 DE_{200}	—	February 24, 2006	Catalina	CSS	·	1.4 km	MPC · JPL
377910	2006 DB_{206}	—	February 25, 2006	Mount Lemmon	Mount Lemmon Survey	·	1.7 km	MPC · JPL
377911	2006 DU_{214}	—	February 27, 2006	Mount Lemmon	Mount Lemmon Survey	AGN	1.1 km	MPC · JPL
377912	2006 DX_{214}	—	February 23, 2006	Anderson Mesa	LONEOS	·	1.5 km	MPC · JPL
377913	2006 EG_{3}	—	March 2, 2006	Kitt Peak	Spacewatch	·	2.3 km	MPC · JPL
377914	2006 EP_{7}	—	March 2, 2006	Kitt Peak	Spacewatch	·	2.7 km	MPC · JPL
377915	2006 EO_{10}	—	March 2, 2006	Kitt Peak	Spacewatch	AGN	1.3 km	MPC · JPL
377916	2006 EH_{14}	—	February 25, 2006	Kitt Peak	Spacewatch	AGN	1.3 km	MPC · JPL
377917	2006 EX_{18}	—	March 2, 2006	Kitt Peak	Spacewatch	·	2.0 km	MPC · JPL
377918	2006 ET_{21}	—	March 3, 2006	Kitt Peak	Spacewatch	(12739)	1.7 km	MPC · JPL
377919	2006 EA_{36}	—	March 3, 2006	Mount Lemmon	Mount Lemmon Survey	HOF	3.5 km	MPC · JPL
377920	2006 EF_{38}	—	March 4, 2006	Kitt Peak	Spacewatch	·	2.1 km	MPC · JPL
377921	2006 EJ_{39}	—	March 4, 2006	Kitt Peak	Spacewatch	·	2.7 km	MPC · JPL
377922	2006 EN_{45}	—	March 1, 2006	Great Shefford	Birtwhistle, P.	·	1.9 km	MPC · JPL
377923	2006 EZ_{52}	—	March 2, 2006	Kitt Peak	Spacewatch	·	2.7 km	MPC · JPL
377924	2006 EX_{72}	—	March 2, 2006	Mount Lemmon	Mount Lemmon Survey	·	2.3 km	MPC · JPL
377925	2006 FQ_{3}	—	March 23, 2006	Kitt Peak	Spacewatch	·	2.5 km	MPC · JPL
377926	2006 FK_{18}	—	March 23, 2006	Kitt Peak	Spacewatch	·	2.4 km	MPC · JPL
377927	2006 FZ_{36}	—	March 23, 2006	Catalina	CSS	·	5.5 km	MPC · JPL
377928	2006 GR_{10}	—	April 2, 2006	Kitt Peak	Spacewatch	·	2.6 km	MPC · JPL
377929	2006 GV_{21}	—	April 2, 2006	Kitt Peak	Spacewatch	·	2.6 km	MPC · JPL
377930	2006 GE_{22}	—	March 23, 2006	Kitt Peak	Spacewatch	·	2.6 km	MPC · JPL
377931	2006 GX_{25}	—	April 2, 2006	Kitt Peak	Spacewatch	·	2.0 km	MPC · JPL
377932	2006 GM_{32}	—	April 2, 2006	Kitt Peak	Spacewatch	·	2.1 km	MPC · JPL
377933	2006 GP_{39}	—	March 23, 2006	Catalina	CSS	·	3.5 km	MPC · JPL
377934	2006 GO_{54}	—	April 7, 2006	Kitt Peak	Spacewatch	·	2.7 km	MPC · JPL
377935	2006 HY_{15}	—	April 20, 2006	Kitt Peak	Spacewatch	MIS	2.2 km	MPC · JPL
377936	2006 HZ_{30}	—	April 20, 2006	Lulin	Q. Ye	·	3.3 km	MPC · JPL
377937	2006 HU_{40}	—	April 21, 2006	Kitt Peak	Spacewatch	T_{j} (2.94)	4.8 km	MPC · JPL
377938	2006 HB_{58}	—	April 30, 2006	Marly	P. Kocher	·	3.1 km	MPC · JPL
377939	2006 HP_{58}	—	April 21, 2006	Palomar	NEAT	·	570 m	MPC · JPL
377940	2006 HT_{59}	—	April 24, 2006	Anderson Mesa	LONEOS	·	3.0 km	MPC · JPL
377941	2006 HZ_{63}	—	April 24, 2006	Kitt Peak	Spacewatch	·	3.3 km	MPC · JPL
377942	2006 HT_{76}	—	April 25, 2006	Kitt Peak	Spacewatch	·	2.5 km	MPC · JPL
377943	2006 HR_{84}	—	April 26, 2006	Kitt Peak	Spacewatch	URS	3.4 km	MPC · JPL
377944	2006 HX_{86}	—	April 29, 2006	Kitt Peak	Spacewatch	·	2.2 km	MPC · JPL
377945	2006 HH_{89}	—	April 19, 2006	Catalina	CSS	T_{j} (2.93)	2.9 km	MPC · JPL
377946	2006 HZ_{90}	—	April 29, 2006	Kitt Peak	Spacewatch	EOS	2.2 km	MPC · JPL
377947	2006 HS_{97}	—	April 7, 2006	Kitt Peak	Spacewatch	DOR	2.8 km	MPC · JPL
377948	2006 HA_{102}	—	April 30, 2006	Kitt Peak	Spacewatch	EOS	1.8 km	MPC · JPL
377949	2006 HP_{152}	—	April 25, 2006	Kitt Peak	Spacewatch	·	1.1 km	MPC · JPL
377950	2006 JJ_{2}	—	May 1, 2006	Kitt Peak	Spacewatch	·	2.7 km	MPC · JPL
377951	2006 JA_{15}	—	May 2, 2006	Mount Lemmon	Mount Lemmon Survey	·	2.2 km	MPC · JPL
377952	2006 JV_{16}	—	May 2, 2006	Kitt Peak	Spacewatch	·	2.6 km	MPC · JPL
377953	2006 JQ_{17}	—	May 2, 2006	Mount Lemmon	Mount Lemmon Survey	EOS	1.6 km	MPC · JPL
377954	2006 JE_{20}	—	May 2, 2006	Kitt Peak	Spacewatch	EOS	2.3 km	MPC · JPL
377955	2006 JV_{21}	—	May 2, 2006	Kitt Peak	Spacewatch	·	2.0 km	MPC · JPL
377956	2006 JR_{31}	—	May 3, 2006	Kitt Peak	Spacewatch	·	2.6 km	MPC · JPL
377957	2006 JS_{42}	—	May 2, 2006	Kitt Peak	Spacewatch	·	2.8 km	MPC · JPL
377958	2006 JL_{48}	—	May 6, 2006	Kitt Peak	Spacewatch	·	3.1 km	MPC · JPL
377959	2006 JK_{61}	—	May 1, 2006	Mauna Kea	P. A. Wiegert	DOR	2.8 km	MPC · JPL
377960	2006 JU_{63}	—	May 1, 2006	Kitt Peak	M. W. Buie	·	2.6 km	MPC · JPL
377961	2006 JE_{64}	—	May 1, 2006	Kitt Peak	M. W. Buie	HOF	2.4 km	MPC · JPL
377962	2006 JN_{81}	—	May 1, 2006	Kitt Peak	Spacewatch	·	1.9 km	MPC · JPL
377963	2006 KR	—	May 17, 2006	Palomar	NEAT	·	3.6 km	MPC · JPL
377964	2006 KN_{9}	—	May 19, 2006	Anderson Mesa	LONEOS	T_{j} (2.99) · (895)	5.4 km	MPC · JPL
377965	2006 KP_{12}	—	May 20, 2006	Kitt Peak	Spacewatch	·	3.6 km	MPC · JPL
377966	2006 KA_{29}	—	May 20, 2006	Kitt Peak	Spacewatch	·	3.4 km	MPC · JPL
377967	2006 KN_{45}	—	May 21, 2006	Kitt Peak	Spacewatch	·	2.4 km	MPC · JPL
377968	2006 KC_{56}	—	May 21, 2006	Siding Spring	SSS	·	910 m	MPC · JPL
377969	2006 KT_{83}	—	May 21, 2006	Kitt Peak	Spacewatch	·	2.1 km	MPC · JPL
377970	2006 KG_{117}	—	May 29, 2006	Kitt Peak	Spacewatch	·	2.3 km	MPC · JPL
377971	2006 LW_{6}	—	June 11, 2006	Palomar	NEAT	·	650 m	MPC · JPL
377972	2006 MF_{10}	—	June 20, 2006	Palomar	NEAT	AMO	470 m	MPC · JPL
377973	2006 NF	—	July 2, 2006	Pla D'Arguines	D'Arguines, Pla	·	840 m	MPC · JPL
377974	2006 OU_{2}	—	June 22, 2006	Kitt Peak	Spacewatch	·	860 m	MPC · JPL
377975	2006 OO_{6}	—	July 21, 2006	Mount Lemmon	Mount Lemmon Survey	·	880 m	MPC · JPL
377976	2006 OC_{12}	—	June 20, 2006	Mount Lemmon	Mount Lemmon Survey	·	700 m	MPC · JPL
377977	2006 OH_{20}	—	July 25, 2006	Mount Lemmon	Mount Lemmon Survey	·	810 m	MPC · JPL
377978	2006 PZ_{17}	—	August 15, 2006	Palomar	NEAT	·	790 m	MPC · JPL
377979	2006 QJ_{21}	—	August 19, 2006	Kitt Peak	Spacewatch	·	630 m	MPC · JPL
377980	2006 QH_{22}	—	August 19, 2006	Anderson Mesa	LONEOS	·	790 m	MPC · JPL
377981	2006 QM_{32}	—	July 21, 2006	Catalina	CSS	·	800 m	MPC · JPL
377982	2006 QV_{52}	—	August 23, 2006	Palomar	NEAT	·	770 m	MPC · JPL
377983	2006 QX_{55}	—	August 17, 2006	Palomar	NEAT	·	700 m	MPC · JPL
377984	2006 QW_{120}	—	August 29, 2006	Catalina	CSS	·	740 m	MPC · JPL
377985	2006 QA_{124}	—	August 29, 2006	Anderson Mesa	LONEOS	·	1.6 km	MPC · JPL
377986	2006 QX_{131}	—	November 24, 2003	Kitt Peak	Spacewatch	·	650 m	MPC · JPL
377987	2006 QJ_{157}	—	August 19, 2006	Kitt Peak	Spacewatch	·	730 m	MPC · JPL
377988	2006 QY_{160}	—	August 19, 2006	Kitt Peak	Spacewatch	·	590 m	MPC · JPL
377989	2006 QT_{167}	—	August 30, 2006	Anderson Mesa	LONEOS	·	2.1 km	MPC · JPL
377990	2006 RJ_{17}	—	September 14, 2006	Palomar	NEAT	·	930 m	MPC · JPL
377991	2006 RQ_{31}	—	September 15, 2006	Kitt Peak	Spacewatch	·	530 m	MPC · JPL
377992	2006 RP_{35}	—	September 14, 2006	Catalina	CSS	·	750 m	MPC · JPL
377993	2006 RC_{39}	—	September 14, 2006	Catalina	CSS	slow?	900 m	MPC · JPL
377994	2006 RS_{39}	—	September 12, 2006	Catalina	CSS	·	760 m	MPC · JPL
377995	2006 RE_{45}	—	September 14, 2006	Kitt Peak	Spacewatch	·	680 m	MPC · JPL
377996	2006 RU_{50}	—	September 14, 2006	Kitt Peak	Spacewatch	CYB	4.0 km	MPC · JPL
377997	2006 RF_{61}	—	July 18, 2006	Mount Lemmon	Mount Lemmon Survey	·	670 m	MPC · JPL
377998	2006 RZ_{83}	—	September 15, 2006	Kitt Peak	Spacewatch	PHO	850 m	MPC · JPL
377999	2006 RK_{90}	—	September 15, 2006	Kitt Peak	Spacewatch	·	600 m	MPC · JPL
378000	2006 RC_{94}	—	September 15, 2006	Kitt Peak	Spacewatch	·	940 m	MPC · JPL

back to top

== See also ==
- Meanings of minor-planet names: 377001–378000
