= List of minor planets discovered using the WISE spacecraft =

The following is a list of numbered minor planets discovered, co-discovered and re-discovered by the Wide-field Infrared Survey Explorer (WISE), a NASA infrared spaceborne observatory. As of July 2018, the list contains 4093 entries, accredited by the Minor Planet Center as discovered by "WISE". Notable discoveries include (310071) 2010 KR59, (336756) 2010 NV1, (419624) 2010 SO16 and (505657) 2014 SR339. Also see Category:Discoveries by WISE.

241527 Edwardwright	8 February 2010	list
241528 Tubman	8 February 2010	list
241529 Roccutri	10 February 2010	list
243516 Marklarsen	6 February 2010	list
243526 Russwalker	19 February 2010	list
243529 Petereisenhardt	20 February 2010	list
243546 Fengchuanliu	8 May 2010	list
246837 Bethfabinsky	13 February 2010	list
246841 Williamirace	24 February 2010	list
246842 Dutchstapelbroek	2 March 2010	list
246861 Johnelwell	17 May 2010	list
249514 Donaldroyer	11 February 2010	list
249515 Heinrichsen	12 February 2010	list
249516 Aretha	15 February 2010	list
249519 Whitneyclavin	11 February 2010	list
249521 Truth	6 February 2010	list
249522 Johndailey	16 February 2010	list
249523 Friedan	22 February 2010	list
249530 Ericrice	14 April 2010	list
249539 Pedrosevilla	16 April 2010	list
249540 Eugeniescott	18 April 2010	list
249541 Steinem	19 April 2010	list
(249542) 2010 HS_{37}	21 April 2010	list
(249543) 2010 HA_{40}	21 April 2010	list
249544 Ianmclean	23 April 2010	list

(249545) 2010 HB_{45}	23 April 2010	list
(249546) 2010 HE_{47}	23 April 2010	list
(249547) 2010 HZ_{83}	28 April 2010	list
(249553) 2010 JV_{136}	14 May 2010	list
(249556) 2010 KX_{29}	18 May 2010	list
251625 Timconrow	17 February 2010	list
251627 Joyceearl	2 May 2010	list
(251628) 2010 JK_{105}	12 May 2010	list
(251629) 2010 JR_{125}	12 May 2010	list
(251630) 2010 JK_{130}	13 May 2010	list
(251631) 2010 KV_{18}	17 May 2010	list
(251632) 2010 KZ_{29}	18 May 2010	list
(251633) 2010 KP_{45}	21 May 2010	list
(251634) 2010 KR_{49}	22 May 2010	list
(251635) 2010 KX_{63}	23 May 2010	list
(251636) 2010 KH_{65}	24 May 2010	list
(251637) 2010 KN_{68}	24 May 2010	list
(251638) 2010 KD_{83}	26 May 2010	list
(251639) 2010 KX_{87}	26 May 2010	list
(251640) 2010 KH_{116}	30 May 2010	list
(251641) 2010 LX_{79}	10 June 2010	list
(251642) 2010 LC_{97}	13 June 2010	list
(257421) 2010 BR_{11}	16 January 2010	list
(257424) 2010 HX_{90}	29 April 2010	list
(257425) 2010 JD_{24}	4 May 2010	list

(257426) 2010 KB_{99}	28 May 2010	list
(257427) 2010 KX_{104}	29 May 2010	list
(257428) 2010 LH_{38}	6 June 2010	list
(257429) 2010 LA_{46}	8 June 2010	list
(257430) 2010 LC_{95}	12 June 2010	list
(257431) 2010 LT_{131}	15 June 2010	list
(257435) 2010 NG_{35}	8 July 2010	list
(257436) 2010 NO_{42}	9 July 2010	list
(257437) 2010 NW_{68}	14 July 2010	list
(257438) 2010 OH_{98}	28 July 2010	list
(264161) 2010 AA_{100}	12 January 2010	list
(264162) 2010 AL_{102}	12 January 2010	list
(264163) 2010 AO_{103}	12 January 2010	list
(264164) 2010 AV_{106}	12 January 2010	list
264165 Poehler	14 January 2010	list
(264167) 2010 BB_{65}	21 January 2010	list
(264175) 2010 DG_{20}	17 February 2010	list
(264181) 2010 ET_{60}	13 March 2010	list
(264195) 2010 HX_{66}	26 April 2010	list
(264199) 2010 LV_{45}	8 June 2010	list
(264201) 2010 NO_{9}	4 July 2010	list
(266919) 2010 BS_{24}	17 January 2010	list
(266921) 2010 CN_{52}	14 February 2010	list
(266924) 2010 DK_{52}	21 February 2010	list
(266930) 2010 HZ_{37}	21 April 2010	list

(266933) 2010 MT_{107}	30 June 2010	list
(269596) 2010 AY_{96}	9 January 2010	list
(269597) 2010 AC_{99}	12 January 2010	list
(269599) 2010 BR_{80}	25 January 2010	list
(269606) 2010 CU_{52}	14 February 2010	list
(269612) 2010 CJ_{198}	14 February 2010	list
(269613) 2010 DE_{14}	17 February 2010	list
(269614) 2010 DU_{52}	22 February 2010	list
(275277) 2010 AT_{89}	8 January 2010	list
275281 Amywalsh	14 January 2010	list
(275290) 2010 EW_{6}	3 March 2010	list
(275295) 2010 NX_{101}	12 July 2010	list
(275296) 2010 OY_{4}	16 July 2010	list
279410 McCallon	1 March 2010	list
(279416) 2010 GR_{6}	1 April 2010	list
(279423) 2010 HS_{111}	19 April 2010	list
(279425) 2010 KR_{118}	30 May 2010	list
(279426) 2010 MU_{8}	16 June 2010	list
(279432) 2010 NF_{63}	11 July 2010	list
(279433) 2010 NX_{68}	14 July 2010	list
(279437) 2010 OV_{10}	16 July 2010	list
(279438) 2010 OO_{20}	18 July 2010	list
(281864) 2010 CX_{243}	2 February 2010	list
(281868) 2010 DH_{70}	28 February 2010	list
(281876) 2010 FP_{35}	18 March 2010	list

(281886) 2010 KM_{110}	29 May 2010	list
(281890) 2010 OA_{74}	25 July 2010	list
(283187) 2010 BB_{13}	16 January 2010	list
(283188) 2010 BV_{15}	16 January 2010	list
(283199) 2010 DP_{13}	16 February 2010	list
(283201) 2010 DG_{55}	21 February 2010	list
(283209) 2010 LE_{92}	12 June 2010	list
(283213) 2010 NY_{55}	10 July 2010	list
(283215) 2010 OQ_{46}	22 July 2010	list
(283217) 2010 OV_{70}	25 July 2010	list
(283218) 2010 OQ_{95}	28 July 2010	list
(284915) 2010 AX_{91}	8 January 2010	list
(284918) 2010 BO_{15}	16 January 2010	list
(284919) 2010 BK_{82}	25 January 2010	list
(284920) 2010 CM_{46}	12 February 2010	list
(284930) 2010 CC_{225}	8 February 2010	list
(284935) 2010 DS_{50}	21 February 2010	list
(284936) 2010 DU_{50}	21 February 2010	list
(284937) 2010 DY_{53}	23 February 2010	list
(284995) 2010 KF_{124}	31 May 2010	list
284996 Rosaparks	9 June 2010	list
(284997) 2010 NV_{7}	4 July 2010	list
(284998) 2010 NU_{29}	7 July 2010	list
(284999) 2010 NN_{90}	2 July 2010	list
(285000) 2010 OS_{56}	23 July 2010	list

(296891) 2010 BS_{9}	16 January 2010	list
(296892) 2010 BF_{25}	17 January 2010	list
(296893) 2010 BV_{36}	18 January 2010	list
(296894) 2010 BP_{39}	19 January 2010	list
(296895) 2010 BS_{46}	19 January 2010	list
(296896) 2010 BN_{105}	28 January 2010	list
(296899) 2010 CO_{7}	6 February 2010	list
(296900) 2010 CY_{9}	8 February 2010	list
(296902) 2010 CN_{13}	10 February 2010	list
(296903) 2010 CK_{16}	11 February 2010	list
(296906) 2010 CO_{51}	13 February 2010	list
296907 Alexander	13 February 2010	list
(296923) 2010 CV_{133}	15 February 2010	list
(296924) 2010 CS_{134}	15 February 2010	list
(296938) 2010 DX_{16}	16 February 2010	list
(296939) 2010 DH_{26}	20 February 2010	list
(296944) 2010 DX_{62}	25 February 2010	list
(296949) 2010 EH_{14}	5 March 2010	list
296950 Robertbauer	4 March 2010	list
(297018) 2010 GM_{11}	2 April 2010	list
(297019) 2010 GN_{23}	1 April 2010	list
(297044) 2010 HH_{13}	18 April 2010	list
(297049) 2010 HS_{48}	24 April 2010	list
(297050) 2010 HY_{50}	24 April 2010	list
(297051) 2010 HA_{54}	24 April 2010	list

(297052) 2010 HB_{81}	28 April 2010	list
(297053) 2010 HG_{99}	30 April 2010	list
(297056) 2010 HA_{109}	29 April 2010	list
(297059) 2010 JV	1 May 2010	list
(297072) 2010 JO_{86}	11 May 2010	list
(297074) 2010 JS_{129}	13 May 2010	list
(297080) 2010 KV_{3}	16 May 2010	list
297082 Bygott	17 May 2010	list
(297083) 2010 KA_{26}	18 May 2010	list
(297085) 2010 KO_{51}	22 May 2010	list
(297086) 2010 KY_{55}	23 May 2010	list
(297087) 2010 KG_{63}	23 May 2010	list
(297088) 2010 KM_{70}	24 May 2010	list
(297090) 2010 KK_{123}	31 May 2010	list
(297092) 2010 LB_{122}	14 June 2010	list
(297097) 2010 ML_{43}	22 June 2010	list
(297104) 2010 OX_{60}	23 July 2010	list
(297107) 2010 OY_{94}	28 July 2010	list
(301582) 2010 AO_{105}	12 January 2010	list
(301584) 2010 BN_{15}	17 January 2010	list
(301585) 2010 BV_{38}	19 January 2010	list
(301586) 2010 BG_{50}	20 January 2010	list
(301587) 2010 CB_{10}	8 February 2010	list
(301588) 2010 CP_{16}	11 February 2010	list
(301609) 2010 CX_{217}	7 February 2010	list

(301611) 2010 DS_{20}	16 February 2010	list
(301616) 2010 DT_{52}	22 February 2010	list
(301617) 2010 DA_{58}	24 February 2010	list
(301624) 2010 EJ_{2}	1 March 2010	list
(301626) 2010 ER_{27}	11 March 2010	list
(301627) 2010 EP_{28}	10 March 2010	list
(301712) 2010 GZ_{71}	13 April 2010	list
(301744) 2010 HV_{64}	26 April 2010	list
(301796) 2010 OW_{41}	21 July 2010	list
(301797) 2010 OL_{83}	26 July 2010	list
(301798) 2010 OT_{84}	26 July 2010	list
(306004) 2010 CZ_{9}	8 February 2010	list
(306005) 2010 CN_{10}	8 February 2010	list
(306010) 2010 CY_{136}	15 February 2010	list
(306015) 2010 DL_{18}	16 February 2010	list
(306016) 2010 DO_{23}	18 February 2010	list
(306017) 2010 DY_{23}	18 February 2010	list
(306018) 2010 DE_{25}	19 February 2010	list
306019 Duren	18 February 2010	list
(306022) 2010 DU_{67}	27 February 2010	list
(306023) 2010 DF_{70}	28 February 2010	list
(306044) 2010 EQ_{163}	3 March 2010	list
(306084) 2010 GP_{154}	15 April 2010	list
(306088) 2010 HD_{7}	16 April 2010	list
(306090) 2010 HP_{25}	19 April 2010	list

(306091) 2010 HA_{35}	20 April 2010	list
(306092) 2010 HZ_{40}	22 April 2010	list
(306093) 2010 HO_{43}	23 April 2010	list
(306094) 2010 HG_{45}	23 April 2010	list
(306095) 2010 HB_{51}	24 April 2010	list
(306096) 2010 HD_{51}	24 April 2010	list
(306098) 2010 HS_{67}	26 April 2010	list
(306102) 2010 HS_{83}	28 April 2010	list
(306116) 2010 JZ_{61}	8 May 2010	list
(306126) 2010 JK_{101}	11 May 2010	list
(306127) 2010 JE_{103}	11 May 2010	list
306128 Pipher	12 May 2010	list
(306135) 2010 JA_{129}	13 May 2010	list
(306136) 2010 JP_{135}	14 May 2010	list
(306142) 2010 KX_{14}	17 May 2010	list
(306143) 2010 KK_{17}	17 May 2010	list
(306151) 2010 KV_{78}	25 May 2010	list
(306152) 2010 KH_{98}	28 May 2010	list
(306164) 2010 ML_{68}	25 June 2010	list
(306165) 2010 MF_{84}	27 June 2010	list
(306166) 2010 MB_{100}	29 June 2010	list
(306172) 2010 NA_{9}	4 July 2010	list
(306173) 2010 NK_{83}	1 July 2010	list
(310035) 2010 GW_{87}	13 April 2010	list
(310047) 2010 HA_{43}	22 April 2010	list

(310048) 2010 HU_{66}	26 April 2010	list
(310051) 2010 HN_{82}	28 April 2010	list
(310057) 2010 JE_{59}	7 May 2010	list
(310070) 2010 KL_{55}	23 May 2010	list
(310071) 2010 KR59	18 May 2010	list
(310074) 2010 KQ_{101}	28 May 2010	list
(310075) 2010 KY_{102}	28 May 2010	list
(310076) 2010 KY_{104}	29 May 2010	list
(310077) 2010 KC_{107}	29 May 2010	list
(310078) 2010 KF_{116}	30 May 2010	list
(310083) 2010 LB_{83}	11 June 2010	list
(310088) 2010 MD_{104}	29 June 2010	list
(312642) 2010 BH_{62}	21 January 2010	list
(312648) 2010 JY_{18}	3 May 2010	list
(312652) 2010 KY_{20}	17 May 2010	list
(312654) 2010 KT_{41}	20 May 2010	list
(312655) 2010 KS_{50}	22 May 2010	list
(312656) 2010 KJ_{63}	23 May 2010	list
(312657) 2010 KW_{78}	25 May 2010	list
(312659) 2010 KV_{90}	27 May 2010	list
(312660) 2010 KS_{95}	27 May 2010	list
(312661) 2010 KL_{114}	30 May 2010	list
(312662) 2010 LZ_{11}	2 June 2010	list
(312663) 2010 LB_{12}	2 June 2010	list
(312664) 2010 LD_{12}	2 June 2010	list

(312666) 2010 LS_{17}	3 June 2010	list
(312667) 2010 LH_{53}	8 June 2010	list
(312668) 2010 LJ_{57}	9 June 2010	list
(312670) 2010 LM_{92}	12 June 2010	list
(312671) 2010 LP_{103}	13 June 2010	list
(312674) 2010 MF_{20}	18 June 2010	list
(312675) 2010 MF_{28}	19 June 2010	list
(312677) 2010 MK_{63}	24 June 2010	list
(312679) 2010 MJ_{73}	26 June 2010	list
(312685) 2010 NM_{30}	7 July 2010	list
(312686) 2010 NZ_{39}	8 July 2010	list
(312687) 2010 NU_{43}	9 July 2010	list
(312690) 2010 NE_{64}	11 July 2010	list
(312691) 2010 NW_{86}	1 July 2010	list
(312700) 2010 OY_{75}	26 July 2010	list
(312707) 2010 PV_{25}	7 August 2010	list
(312773) 2010 UW_{82}	12 January 2010	list
(316180) 2010 GN_{76}	10 April 2010	list
(316183) 2010 HB_{39}	21 April 2010	list
(316184) 2010 JS_{126}	13 May 2010	list
(316185) 2010 JN_{129}	13 May 2010	list
316186 Kathrynjoyce	19 May 2010	list
(316187) 2010 KD_{47}	21 May 2010	list
(316192) 2010 LO_{53}	8 June 2010	list
(316193) 2010 LJ_{71}	10 June 2010	list

(316194) 2010 LZ_{80}	11 June 2010	list
(316195) 2010 LN_{100}	13 June 2010	list
(316196) 2010 LF_{119}	14 June 2010	list
(316198) 2010 MP_{33}	21 June 2010	list
(316199) 2010 MA_{37}	21 June 2010	list
316201 Malala	23 June 2010	list
316202 Johnfowler	16 June 2010	list
(316204) 2010 ML_{61}	24 June 2010	list
(316206) 2010 MU_{74}	26 June 2010	list
(316209) 2010 MD_{94}	28 June 2010	list
(316215) 2010 NV_{13}	5 July 2010	list
(316219) 2010 NJ_{34}	8 July 2010	list
(316222) 2010 NG_{44}	9 July 2010	list
(316228) 2010 NX_{106}	12 July 2010	list
(316230) 2010 NF_{112}	13 July 2010	list
(316231) 2010 NY_{114}	14 July 2010	list
(316232) 2010 OT_{4}	16 July 2010	list
(316240) 2010 OZ_{27}	19 July 2010	list
(316241) 2010 OX_{28}	19 July 2010	list
(316255) 2010 OG_{88}	27 July 2010	list
(316263) 2010 OT_{121}	31 July 2010	list
(316267) 2010 PW_{25}	7 August 2010	list
(316550) 2010 XE_{81}	17 January 2010	list
(321654) 2010 BE_{60}	21 January 2010	list
(321655) 2010 BQ_{70}	22 January 2010	list

(321718) 2010 HU_{86}	28 April 2010	list
(321723) 2010 KY_{44}	20 May 2010	list
(321724) 2010 KM_{45}	21 May 2010	list
(321725) 2010 KP_{47}	21 May 2010	list
(321726) 2010 KJ_{50}	22 May 2010	list
(321727) 2010 KN_{93}	27 May 2010	list
(321730) 2010 LQ_{4}	1 June 2010	list
(321731) 2010 LQ_{50}	8 June 2010	list
(321734) 2010 LC_{81}	11 June 2010	list
(321737) 2010 ML_{23}	18 June 2010	list
(321739) 2010 MK_{39}	22 June 2010	list
(321741) 2010 MW_{53}	16 June 2010	list
(321742) 2010 MH_{55}	16 June 2010	list
(321743) 2010 MA_{67}	25 June 2010	list
(321744) 2010 MM_{70}	25 June 2010	list
(321746) 2010 MW_{105}	30 June 2010	list
(321747) 2010 MW_{106}	30 June 2010	list
(321754) 2010 NS_{38}	8 July 2010	list
(321756) 2010 NK_{85}	1 July 2010	list
(321759) 2010 NZ_{102}	12 July 2010	list
(321760) 2010 NY_{103}	12 July 2010	list
(321762) 2010 NO_{109}	13 July 2010	list
(321764) 2010 OL_{10}	16 July 2010	list
(321767) 2010 OS_{19}	18 July 2010	list
(321770) 2010 OJ_{32}	20 July 2010	list

(321776) 2010 OA_{78}	25 July 2010	list
(321777) 2010 OT_{79}	26 July 2010	list
(321779) 2010 OT_{82}	26 July 2010	list
(321780) 2010 OM_{84}	26 July 2010	list
(321782) 2010 OQ_{86}	27 July 2010	list
(321788) 2010 OW_{105}	29 July 2010	list
(321801) 2010 PA_{67}	8 August 2010	list
(322316) 2011 GG	27 January 2010	list
(322560) 2011 YK_{58}	16 January 2010	list
(325764) 2010 AF_{105}	12 January 2010	list
(325766) 2010 JX_{140}	15 May 2010	list
(325767) 2010 KG_{108}	29 May 2010	list
(325770) 2010 MO_{54}	16 June 2010	list
(325774) 2010 NR_{73}	15 July 2010	list
(325775) 2010 NE_{76}	15 July 2010	list
(325784) 2010 PP_{38}	6 August 2010	list
(325881) 2010 TZ_{175}	23 July 2010	list
(326055) 2011 AO_{11}	17 January 2010	list
(326153) 2012 BE_{67}	29 January 2010	list
(328872) 2010 AO_{92}	8 January 2010	list
(328880) 2010 CJ_{10}	8 February 2010	list
(328882) 2010 EV_{3}	2 March 2010	list
(328883) 2010 HG	16 April 2010	list
(328885) 2010 NU_{31}	7 July 2010	list
(328886) 2010 OK_{35}	21 July 2010	list

(329082) 2011 BG_{46}	18 February 2010	list
(329155) 2012 BX_{22}	26 July 2010	list
(329429) 2002 NY_{76}	9 March 2010	list
(331109) 2010 NR_{69}	14 July 2010	list
(331294) 2011 EH_{7}	11 February 2010	list
(332840) 2010 DZ_{59}	25 February 2010	list
(332841) 2010 EA_{6}	2 March 2010	list
(332884) 2011 AG_{53}	12 February 2010	list
(333031) 2011 SX_{42}	27 January 2010	list
336694 Fey	8 January 2010	list
(336697) 2010 BG_{53}	20 January 2010	list
(336725) 2010 DE_{31}	20 February 2010	list
(336753) 2010 HK_{85}	28 April 2010	list
(336754) 2010 KK_{63}	23 May 2010	list
(336755) 2010 KA_{95}	27 May 2010	list
(336756) 2010 NV1	1 July 2010	list
(336774) 2011 BC_{63}	12 March 2010	list
(337597) 2001 SY_{355}	21 July 2010	list
(343301) 2010 AR_{81}	8 January 2010	list
(343302) 2010 AE_{89}	8 January 2010	list
(343303) 2010 AO_{95}	9 January 2010	list
(343305) 2010 AJ_{110}	13 January 2010	list
(343306) 2010 AG_{115}	13 January 2010	list
(343307) 2010 AQ_{120}	14 January 2010	list
(343312) 2010 BH_{28}	18 January 2010	list

(343313) 2010 BX_{40}	19 January 2010	list
(343314) 2010 BC_{57}	21 January 2010	list
(343315) 2010 BK_{61}	21 January 2010	list
(343316) 2010 BU_{68}	22 January 2010	list
(343317) 2010 BV_{71}	23 January 2010	list
(343318) 2010 BS_{73}	23 January 2010	list
(343319) 2010 BD_{76}	24 January 2010	list
(343327) 2010 CL_{8}	7 February 2010	list
(343328) 2010 CH_{9}	8 February 2010	list
(343329) 2010 CB_{14}	10 February 2010	list
(343330) 2010 CH_{17}	11 February 2010	list
(343343) 2010 CJ_{48}	12 February 2010	list
(343380) 2010 CE_{133}	12 February 2010	list
(343381) 2010 CW_{135}	14 February 2010	list
(343416) 2010 CR_{206}	4 February 2010	list
(343423) 2010 DF_{16}	17 February 2010	list
(343426) 2010 DO_{22}	18 February 2010	list
(343464) 2010 EN_{61}	14 March 2010	list
(343593) 2010 GY_{95}	14 April 2010	list
(343627) 2010 HY_{31}	20 April 2010	list
(343628) 2010 HC_{41}	22 April 2010	list
(343630) 2010 HP_{99}	30 April 2010	list
(343635) 2010 JC_{4}	1 May 2010	list
(343642) 2010 JC_{42}	7 May 2010	list
(343650) 2010 JY_{85}	10 May 2010	list

(343656) 2010 LR_{46}	8 June 2010	list
(343662) 2010 MO_{56}	23 June 2010	list
(343664) 2010 NM_{16}	6 July 2010	list
(343665) 2010 NM_{74}	15 July 2010	list
(343666) 2010 OD_{37}	21 July 2010	list
(343667) 2010 OY_{49}	22 July 2010	list
(343668) 2010 OY_{52}	22 July 2010	list
(343669) 2010 OP_{53}	23 July 2010	list
(343670) 2010 OU_{57}	23 July 2010	list
(343671) 2010 OV_{60}	23 July 2010	list
(343672) 2010 OP_{69}	25 July 2010	list
(343673) 2010 OD_{74}	25 July 2010	list
(343674) 2010 OM_{78}	25 July 2010	list
(343675) 2010 OU_{80}	26 July 2010	list
(343738) 2011 FD_{12}	2 March 2010	list
(343742) 2011 FC_{15}	27 March 2010	list
(343813) 2011 HM_{7}	6 April 2010	list
(343868) 2011 HL_{66}	20 May 2010	list
(343949) 2011 KT_{27}	6 May 2010	list
(343975) 2011 LC_{20}	2 May 2010	list
(343993) 2011 PW_{8}	22 April 2010	list
(346949) 2010 AJ_{87}	8 January 2010	list
(346950) 2010 AG_{89}	8 January 2010	list
(346951) 2010 AU_{90}	8 January 2010	list
(346952) 2010 AQ_{94}	8 January 2010	list

(346954) 2010 AX_{105}	12 January 2010	list
(346956) 2010 AB_{113}	13 January 2010	list
(346958) 2010 BX_{51}	20 January 2010	list
(346960) 2010 BJ_{78}	24 January 2010	list
(346966) 2010 CD_{7}	6 February 2010	list
(346967) 2010 CP_{8}	7 February 2010	list
(346989) 2010 CU_{129}	10 February 2010	list
(347000) 2010 CW_{216}	7 February 2010	list
(347001) 2010 CN_{220}	7 February 2010	list
(347002) 2010 CC_{227}	9 February 2010	list
(347003) 2010 CH_{229}	9 February 2010	list
(347007) 2010 DM_{23}	18 February 2010	list
(347008) 2010 DP_{32}	18 February 2010	list
(347009) 2010 DF_{33}	19 February 2010	list
(347014) 2010 DT_{55}	22 February 2010	list
(347079) 2010 GX_{31}	20 January 2010	list
(347082) 2010 GV_{39}	6 April 2010	list
(347099) 2010 HO_{21}	22 April 2010	list
(347132) 2010 LE_{33}	6 June 2010	list
(347133) 2010 LT_{77}	10 June 2010	list
(347135) 2010 NZ_{93}	3 July 2010	list
(347136) 2010 OO_{33}	20 July 2010	list
(347137) 2010 OO_{46}	22 July 2010	list
(347138) 2010 OB_{50}	22 July 2010	list
(347140) 2010 OU_{70}	25 July 2010	list

(347143) 2010 OX_{88}	27 July 2010	list
(347144) 2010 OR_{98}	28 July 2010	list
(347145) 2010 OF_{121}	31 July 2010	list
(347146) 2010 OC_{122}	31 July 2010	list
(347295) 2011 OM_{3}	8 February 2010	list
(347323) 2011 SM_{39}	12 March 2010	list
(347853) 2002 QK_{144}	23 July 2010	list
(349945) 2010 CD_{52}	14 February 2010	list
(349959) 2010 CC_{222}	8 February 2010	list
(349961) 2010 DO_{30}	19 February 2010	list
(349963) 2010 DV_{31}	17 February 2010	list
(349965) 2010 DP_{65}	26 February 2010	list
(349966) 2010 ER_{7}	3 March 2010	list
(349967) 2010 ET_{7}	3 March 2010	list
(349996) 2010 FU_{92}	14 January 2010	list
(350006) 2010 GR_{147}	15 April 2010	list
(350009) 2010 HX_{23}	26 April 2010	list
(350010) 2010 HP_{68}	27 April 2010	list
(350011) 2010 HJ_{74}	28 April 2010	list
(350025) 2010 JX_{115}	22 January 2010	list
(350032) 2010 JH_{151}	17 February 2010	list
(350038) 2010 KW_{14}	17 May 2010	list
(350047) 2010 OA_{7}	16 July 2010	list
(350050) 2010 PP_{5}	1 August 2010	list
(350051) 2010 PH_{25}	5 August 2010	list

(350053) 2010 PE_{49}	7 August 2010	list
(350112) 2011 QM_{8}	14 February 2010	list
(350217) 2012 SW_{17}	14 January 2010	list
(350343) 2012 UJ_{105}	18 May 2010	list
(350366) 2012 UN_{146}	12 February 2010	list
(350857) 2002 MP_{7}	16 March 2010	list
(350869) 2002 OY_{36}	2 April 2010	list
(353229) 2010 AA_{122}	14 January 2010	list
(353231) 2010 BA_{68}	22 January 2010	list
(353235) 2010 CO_{47}	12 February 2010	list
(353246) 2010 DX_{33}	20 February 2010	list
(353247) 2010 DF_{54}	23 February 2010	list
(353284) 2010 GH_{31}	9 January 2010	list
(353294) 2010 GR_{154}	15 April 2010	list
(353295) 2010 GO_{155}	15 April 2010	list
(353298) 2010 HC_{46}	23 April 2010	list
(353306) 2010 JW_{58}	7 May 2010	list
(353312) 2010 JV_{127}	13 May 2010	list
(353316) 2010 KN_{17}	17 May 2010	list
(353318) 2010 KE_{51}	22 May 2010	list
(353319) 2010 KO_{94}	27 May 2010	list
(353320) 2010 LB	2 March 2010	list
(353322) 2010 LB_{10}	2 June 2010	list
(353323) 2010 LH_{29}	6 June 2010	list
(353328) 2010 ME_{27}	19 June 2010	list

(353329) 2010 MG_{44}	22 June 2010	list
(353333) 2010 OT_{71}	25 July 2010	list
(353335) 2010 PD_{12}	2 August 2010	list
(353425) 2011 QX_{40}	1 August 2010	list
(353475) 2011 SZ_{29}	3 June 2010	list
(353714) 2011 VQ_{8}	31 July 2010	list
(353813) 2012 TY_{230}	13 February 2010	list
(353861) 2012 VV_{96}	28 January 2010	list
(356275) 2010 AU_{92}	8 January 2010	list
(356278) 2010 BG_{28}	18 January 2010	list
(356286) 2010 DO_{26}	20 February 2010	list
(356303) 2010 GL_{72}	13 April 2010	list
(356312) 2010 HY_{54}	25 April 2010	list
(356313) 2010 HB_{73}	27 April 2010	list
(356320) 2010 JK_{8}	1 May 2010	list
(356324) 2010 JZ_{58}	7 May 2010	list
(356330) 2010 JU_{94}	10 May 2010	list
(356331) 2010 JU_{99}	11 May 2010	list
(356332) 2010 JV_{131}	13 May 2010	list
(356338) 2010 KO_{77}	25 May 2010	list
(356339) 2010 KT_{96}	28 May 2010	list
(356340) 2010 KS_{102}	28 May 2010	list
(356341) 2010 KL_{111}	30 May 2010	list
(356344) 2010 KN_{125}	31 May 2010	list
(356345) 2010 LU_{2}	1 June 2010	list

(356346) 2010 LN_{4}	1 June 2010	list
(356349) 2010 LG_{60}	9 June 2010	list
(356352) 2010 LV_{68}	9 June 2010	list
(356353) 2010 LJ_{88}	12 June 2010	list
(356354) 2010 LV_{90}	12 June 2010	list
(356355) 2010 LW_{101}	13 June 2010	list
(356356) 2010 LZ_{102}	13 June 2010	list
(356357) 2010 LO_{103}	13 June 2010	list
(356358) 2010 LJ_{119}	14 June 2010	list
(356359) 2010 LZ_{121}	14 June 2010	list
(356360) 2010 LF_{125}	15 June 2010	list
(356363) 2010 ME_{18}	17 June 2010	list
(356364) 2010 MD_{58}	24 June 2010	list
(356365) 2010 MP_{63}	24 June 2010	list
(356366) 2010 MB_{68}	25 June 2010	list
(356367) 2010 MQ_{79}	26 June 2010	list
(356368) 2010 MR_{84}	27 June 2010	list
(356369) 2010 MU_{89}	27 June 2010	list
(356375) 2010 NB_{32}	7 July 2010	list
(356376) 2010 NW_{78}	15 July 2010	list
(356378) 2010 NX_{113}	13 July 2010	list
(356379) 2010 OW_{4}	16 July 2010	list
(356394) 2010 QD_{2}	21 August 2010	list
(356610) 2011 UV_{2}	10 April 2010	list
(356646) 2011 UK_{53}	7 June 2010	list

(356651) 2011 UK_{61}	2 June 2010	list
(356671) 2011 US_{84}	19 May 2010	list
(356775) 2011 UL_{281}	19 June 2010	list
356863 Maathai	25 June 2010	list
(356865) 2011 WZ_{70}	17 June 2010	list
(356910) 2012 AA_{17}	8 February 2010	list
(357218) 2002 GK_{190}	24 May 2010	list
(357263) 2002 QB_{141}	28 February 2010	list
(359372) 2010 CN_{189}	11 February 2010	list
(359373) 2010 CX_{222}	8 February 2010	list
(359374) 2010 DD_{18}	17 February 2010	list
(359376) 2010 DW_{31}	17 February 2010	list
(359382) 2010 FA_{75}	30 March 2010	list
(359389) 2010 GE_{153}	15 April 2010	list
(359390) 2010 GO_{154}	15 April 2010	list
(359392) 2010 HF_{6}	16 April 2010	list
(359394) 2010 HE_{55}	25 April 2010	list
(359396) 2010 HS_{82}	28 April 2010	list
(359400) 2010 JQ_{23}	4 May 2010	list
(359412) 2010 KX_{56}	20 May 2010	list
(359413) 2010 KR_{77}	25 May 2010	list
(359414) 2010 KQ_{96}	28 May 2010	list
(359415) 2010 KU_{114}	30 May 2010	list
(359416) 2010 KZ_{121}	31 May 2010	list
(359418) 2010 LT_{4}	1 June 2010	list

(359423) 2010 LY_{39}	7 June 2010	list
(359424) 2010 LU_{43}	7 June 2010	list
(359425) 2010 LO_{54}	9 June 2010	list
359426 Lacks	10 June 2010	list
(359427) 2010 LD_{82}	11 June 2010	list
(359428) 2010 LJ_{86}	11 June 2010	list
(359429) 2010 LA_{88}	12 June 2010	list
(359430) 2010 LJ_{115}	13 June 2010	list
(359431) 2010 LB_{118}	14 June 2010	list
(359432) 2010 MY_{7}	16 June 2010	list
(359434) 2010 MJ_{43}	22 June 2010	list
(359436) 2010 MT_{56}	24 June 2010	list
(359437) 2010 MN_{63}	24 June 2010	list
(359438) 2010 MA_{66}	25 June 2010	list
(359440) 2010 MX_{75}	26 June 2010	list
(359441) 2010 MS_{77}	26 June 2010	list
(359445) 2010 MH_{96}	28 June 2010	list
(359447) 2010 MZ_{101}	29 June 2010	list
(359449) 2010 NV_{11}	2 July 2010	list
(359451) 2010 NZ_{14}	5 July 2010	list
(359454) 2010 NH_{30}	7 July 2010	list
(359455) 2010 NW_{37}	8 July 2010	list
(359458) 2010 NE_{49}	9 July 2010	list
(359460) 2010 NJ_{51}	10 July 2010	list
(359462) 2010 NA_{55}	10 July 2010	list

(359464) 2010 NG_{61}	11 July 2010	list
(359466) 2010 NB_{62}	11 July 2010	list
(359467) 2010 NF_{64}	11 July 2010	list
(359469) 2010 NH_{75}	15 July 2010	list
(359470) 2010 NE_{80}	15 July 2010	list
(359472) 2010 NZ_{114}	14 July 2010	list
(359476) 2010 OT_{13}	17 July 2010	list
(359482) 2010 OC_{31}	20 July 2010	list
(359741) 2011 UE_{54}	30 May 2010	list
(359757) 2011 UB_{99}	22 May 2010	list
(359777) 2011 UX_{140}	18 April 2010	list
(359797) 2011 UN_{203}	10 June 2010	list
(359936) 2011 YW_{20}	29 June 2010	list
(360031) 2013 AA_{30}	26 January 2010	list
(360038) 2013 AY_{41}	16 April 2010	list
(360107) 2013 CS_{14}	17 January 2010	list
(360163) 2013 CC_{72}	27 May 2010	list
(360444) 2002 LX_{63}	26 May 2010	list
(362325) 2010 HA_{29}	19 April 2010	list
(362326) 2010 HW_{30}	19 April 2010	list
(362332) 2010 KW_{34}	19 May 2010	list
(362334) 2010 KY_{49}	22 May 2010	list
(362335) 2010 KZ_{120}	31 May 2010	list
(362336) 2010 LN_{18}	3 June 2010	list
(362337) 2010 LO_{37}	6 June 2010	list

(362339) 2010 LS_{50}	8 June 2010	list
(362342) 2010 LM_{85}	11 June 2010	list
(362345) 2010 MD_{34}	21 June 2010	list
(362347) 2010 ME_{46}	23 June 2010	list
(362349) 2010 MZ_{65}	25 June 2010	list
(362353) 2010 ML_{89}	27 June 2010	list
(362354) 2010 MB_{90}	27 June 2010	list
(362355) 2010 ME_{94}	28 June 2010	list
(362356) 2010 MN_{97}	28 June 2010	list
(362364) 2010 NP_{19}	6 July 2010	list
(362367) 2010 NH_{28}	7 July 2010	list
(362369) 2010 NC_{45}	9 July 2010	list
(362370) 2010 ND_{48}	9 July 2010	list
(362371) 2010 NE_{48}	9 July 2010	list
(362374) 2010 NS_{57}	10 July 2010	list
(362375) 2010 NK_{61}	11 July 2010	list
(362378) 2010 NQ_{73}	15 July 2010	list
(362379) 2010 NJ_{76}	15 July 2010	list
(362382) 2010 NY_{105}	12 July 2010	list
(362383) 2010 NV_{106}	12 July 2010	list
(362384) 2010 NM_{113}	13 July 2010	list
(362386) 2010 NY_{113}	13 July 2010	list
(362390) 2010 OW_{38}	21 July 2010	list
(362392) 2010 OV_{43}	21 July 2010	list
(362393) 2010 ON_{51}	22 July 2010	list

(362394) 2010 OE_{58}	23 July 2010	list
(362397) 2010 OF_{75}	25 July 2010	list
(362398) 2010 OK_{94}	28 July 2010	list
(362402) 2010 OG_{114}	30 July 2010	list
(362419) 2010 PH_{69}	9 August 2010	list
(362529) 2010 UW_{5}	25 July 2010	list
(362565) 2010 VX_{70}	6 August 2010	list
(362778) 2011 WY_{105}	30 July 2010	list
(362786) 2011 WT_{126}	15 April 2010	list
(362809) 2011 YF_{18}	28 June 2010	list
(362818) 2011 YK_{73}	7 August 2010	list
(362838) 2012 BR_{3}	15 July 2010	list
(362847) 2012 BD_{28}	6 August 2010	list
(362899) 2012 BB_{146}	8 August 2010	list
(362921) 2012 DS_{3}	6 August 2010	list
(362964) 2013 BL_{55}	1 May 2010	list
(362981) 2013 CK_{58}	16 January 2010	list
(363315) 2002 ND_{80}	3 February 2010	list
(365420) 2010 HQ_{35}	20 April 2010	list
(365421) 2010 JP_{17}	3 May 2010	list
(365422) 2010 JX_{108}	12 May 2010	list
(365424) 2010 KX_{7}	16 May 2010	list
(365425) 2010 KP_{53}	23 May 2010	list
(365427) 2010 KD_{109}	29 May 2010	list
(365429) 2010 LF_{32}	6 June 2010	list

(365430) 2010 LK_{41}	7 June 2010	list
(365431) 2010 LO_{51}	8 June 2010	list
(365432) 2010 LQ_{52}	8 June 2010	list
(365433) 2010 LS_{90}	12 June 2010	list
(365434) 2010 LX_{102}	13 June 2010	list
(365437) 2010 LV_{120}	14 June 2010	list
(365439) 2010 LQ_{127}	15 June 2010	list
(365440) 2010 LT_{130}	15 June 2010	list
(365442) 2010 MF_{48}	23 June 2010	list
365443 Holiday	23 June 2010	list
(365445) 2010 MG_{62}	24 June 2010	list
(365447) 2010 MY_{105}	30 June 2010	list
(365449) 2010 NJ_{1}	3 July 2010	list
(365455) 2010 NA_{56}	10 July 2010	list
(365456) 2010 NX_{66}	28 January 2010	list
(365458) 2010 NC_{87}	1 July 2010	list
(365459) 2010 NS_{88}	2 July 2010	list
(365460) 2010 NM_{89}	2 July 2010	list
(365466) 2010 OU_{36}	21 July 2010	list
(365467) 2010 OP_{68}	25 July 2010	list
(365468) 2010 OB_{88}	27 July 2010	list
(365480) 2010 PE_{41}	6 August 2010	list
(365482) 2010 PQ_{42}	6 August 2010	list
(365599) 2010 TQ_{170}	21 July 2010	list
(365617) 2010 UQ_{31}	24 July 2010	list

(365636) 2010 UX_{83}	27 July 2010	list
(365639) 2010 UY_{91}	31 July 2010	list
(365790) 2011 AK_{21}	1 February 2010	list
(365831) 2011 SN_{275}	11 March 2010	list
(365843) 2011 UM_{76}	18 May 2010	list
(365927) 2011 YU_{40}	9 August 2010	list
(365965) 2012 BS_{33}	24 April 2010	list
(366043) 2012 CJ_{5}	14 July 2010	list
(366255) 2012 YB_{4}	27 March 2010	list
(366281) 2013 AA_{103}	21 April 2010	list
(366301) 2013 CM_{22}	6 June 2010	list
(367671) 2010 BX_{64}	22 January 2010	list
(367674) 2010 EJ_{15}	6 March 2010	list
(367676) 2010 JV_{81}	12 May 2010	list
(367677) 2010 ML_{17}	17 June 2010	list
(367678) 2010 MY_{56}	24 June 2010	list
(367679) 2010 MB_{104}	30 June 2010	list
(367681) 2010 NL_{82}	1 July 2010	list
(367682) 2010 NB_{99}	12 July 2010	list
(367683) 2010 OP_{8}	16 July 2010	list
(367731) 2010 US_{62}	6 August 2010	list
(367792) 2011 AB_{14}	18 January 2010	list
(367832) 2011 BR_{32}	13 February 2010	list
(367835) 2011 BQ_{80}	29 January 2010	list
(367848) 2011 CN_{4}	14 February 2010	list

(368092) 2013 AK_{4}	17 May 2010	list
(368099) 2013 CP	16 June 2010	list
(368100) 2013 CU_{1}	2 May 2010	list
(368364) 2002 QF_{147}	19 March 2010	list
(369445) 2010 BF_{39}	19 January 2010	list
(369446) 2010 BF_{63}	21 January 2010	list
(369453) 2010 LV_{75}	10 June 2010	list
(369454) 2010 NZ_{1}	9 July 2010	list
(369560) 2011 AK_{75}	27 January 2010	list
(369624) 2011 DH_{11}	9 February 2010	list
(369634) 2011 EG_{12}	16 February 2010	list
(372755) 2010 CC_{13}	9 February 2010	list
(372782) 2010 FQ_{43}	21 March 2010	list
(372783) 2010 GC_{41}	7 April 2010	list
(372903) 2011 AB_{53}	11 February 2010	list
(372935) 2011 BT_{47}	19 February 2010	list
(373014) 2011 DU_{10}	5 February 2010	list
(373041) 2011 EB_{53}	16 April 2010	list
(373092) 2011 FB_{141}	6 April 2010	list
(373136) 2011 YF_{6}	18 June 2010	list
(373381) 2012 RT_{4}	30 March 2010	list
(376024) 2010 AD_{87}	8 January 2010	list
(376026) 2010 BR_{46}	19 January 2010	list
(376033) 2010 CB_{51}	13 February 2010	list
(376048) 2010 DW_{27}	18 February 2010	list

(376057) 2010 EH_{147}	8 March 2010	list
(376058) 2010 FX_{7}	16 March 2010	list
(376071) 2010 OE_{49}	22 July 2010	list
(376190) 2011 CN_{65}	1 February 2010	list
(376238) 2011 EC_{50}	3 March 2010	list
(376255) 2011 FB_{2}	7 April 2010	list
(376260) 2011 FF_{10}	20 March 2010	list
(376304) 2011 FU_{149}	13 March 2010	list
(376344) 2011 HL_{27}	27 April 2010	list
(376363) 2011 KV_{4}	3 June 2010	list
(376519) 2012 LZ_{24}	2 April 2010	list
(376520) 2012 LC_{25}	17 February 2010	list
(379423) 2010 AB_{122}	14 January 2010	list
(379426) 2010 BF_{10}	16 January 2010	list
(379427) 2010 BV_{93}	27 January 2010	list
(379437) 2010 CD_{53}	14 February 2010	list
(379471) 2010 DG_{34}	20 February 2010	list
(379479) 2010 EH_{10}	4 March 2010	list
(379504) 2010 GB_{74}	14 April 2010	list
(379511) 2010 HC_{1}	18 April 2010	list
(379512) 2010 HJ_{63}	26 April 2010	list
(379516) 2010 LM_{6}	1 June 2010	list
(379518) 2010 LB_{49}	8 June 2010	list
(379519) 2010 LS_{68}	9 June 2010	list
(379521) 2010 OR_{86}	27 July 2010	list

(379624) 2011 DM_{8}	14 January 2010	list
(379691) 2011 FH_{57}	1 April 2010	list
(379704) 2011 FK_{142}	26 April 2010	list
(379728) 2011 GJ_{46}	25 January 2010	list
(379769) 2011 HC_{25}	6 May 2010	list
(379836) 2011 QF	16 April 2010	list
(379837) 2011 QP_{3}	9 April 2010	list
(379839) 2011 QQ_{42}	19 April 2010	list
(379950) 2012 OC_{2}	27 January 2010	list
(379983) 2012 TJ_{144}	22 April 2010	list
(381888) 2010 AT_{105}	12 January 2010	list
(381889) 2010 AS_{107}	12 January 2010	list
(381890) 2010 AT_{107}	12 January 2010	list
(381896) 2010 BT_{11}	16 January 2010	list
(381897) 2010 BW_{40}	19 January 2010	list
(381898) 2010 BM_{46}	19 January 2010	list
(381900) 2010 BU_{76}	24 January 2010	list
(381905) 2010 CW_{17}	11 February 2010	list
(381926) 2010 CY_{134}	10 February 2010	list
(381942) 2010 CH_{245}	3 February 2010	list
(381947) 2010 DK_{23}	18 February 2010	list
(381948) 2010 DB_{27}	18 February 2010	list
(381950) 2010 DF_{56}	23 February 2010	list
(381971) 2010 EV_{168}	7 March 2010	list
(381979) 2010 GY_{48}	8 April 2010	list

(381986) 2010 HZ_{19}	30 January 2010	list
(381989) 2010 HR_{80}	28 April 2010	list
(381990) 2010 HS_{102}	30 April 2010	list
(381993) 2010 KQ_{34}	19 May 2010	list
(381999) 2010 LO_{118}	14 June 2010	list
(382001) 2010 OM_{15}	17 July 2010	list
(382002) 2010 OK_{46}	29 January 2010	list
(382003) 2010 OZ_{60}	23 July 2010	list
(382147) 2011 LU_{22}	28 May 2010	list
(382151) 2011 QJ_{95}	23 April 2010	list
(382203) 2012 PC_{8}	7 June 2010	list
(382291) 2012 UQ_{61}	7 May 2010	list
(382297) 2012 VO_{43}	22 February 2010	list
(384453) 2010 AG_{86}	8 January 2010	list
(384454) 2010 AS_{99}	12 January 2010	list
(384455) 2010 AY_{117}	13 January 2010	list
(384461) 2010 BS_{7}	16 January 2010	list
(384462) 2010 BX_{20}	17 January 2010	list
(384463) 2010 BM_{57}	21 January 2010	list
(384464) 2010 BO_{57}	21 January 2010	list
(384465) 2010 BQ_{65}	22 January 2010	list
(384466) 2010 BK_{71}	23 January 2010	list
(384518) 2010 CG_{218}	7 February 2010	list
(384523) 2010 DE_{22}	17 February 2010	list
(384524) 2010 DF_{22}	17 February 2010	list

(384531) 2010 DG_{53}	22 February 2010	list
384533 Tenerelli	23 February 2010	list
(384534) 2010 DG_{73}	27 February 2010	list
(384538) 2010 EH_{1}	1 March 2010	list
(384569) 2010 GA_{122}	20 January 2010	list
(384570) 2010 GA_{127}	1 February 2010	list
(384572) 2010 GO_{157}	14 January 2010	list
(384582) 2010 JS_{14}	2 May 2010	list
(384583) 2010 JC_{44}	13 February 2010	list
(384584) 2010 JL_{85}	16 January 2010	list
(384590) 2010 KK_{32}	19 May 2010	list
(384592) 2010 LX_{30}	6 June 2010	list
(384595) 2010 OV_{13}	27 January 2010	list
(384596) 2010 OL_{17}	17 July 2010	list
(384598) 2010 OY_{63}	24 July 2010	list
(384599) 2010 OA_{64}	30 January 2010	list
(384600) 2010 OV_{97}	28 July 2010	list
(384601) 2010 OW_{101}	29 January 2010	list
(384643) 2011 EU_{62}	6 March 2010	list
(384699) 2011 HQ_{11}	18 May 2010	list
(384730) 2011 KR_{3}	3 April 2010	list
(384763) 2012 JA_{28}	5 March 2010	list
(384961) 2012 TA_{151}	23 January 2010	list
(384990) 2012 TH_{191}	16 January 2010	list
(385089) 2012 UG_{171}	5 May 2010	list

(385174) 2013 WL_{2}	14 March 2010	list
(386743) 2010 AR_{116}	13 January 2010	list
(386746) 2010 BU_{11}	16 January 2010	list
(386747) 2010 BC_{25}	17 January 2010	list
(386749) 2010 BZ_{60}	21 January 2010	list
(386750) 2010 BB_{94}	27 January 2010	list
(386751) 2010 CR_{10}	9 February 2010	list
(386752) 2010 CW_{12}	9 February 2010	list
(386772) 2010 CA_{223}	8 February 2010	list
(386773) 2010 CB_{223}	8 February 2010	list
(386774) 2010 CK_{225}	8 February 2010	list
(386778) 2010 DF_{24}	19 February 2010	list
(386784) 2010 EY_{18}	8 March 2010	list
(386832) 2010 HU_{58}	25 April 2010	list
(386836) 2010 JO_{39}	23 February 2010	list
(386840) 2010 JX_{106}	12 May 2010	list
(386842) 2010 JQ_{117}	18 February 2010	list
(386846) 2010 KS_{14}	17 May 2010	list
(386847) 2010 LR_{33}	6 June 2010	list
(386851) 2010 ME_{75}	26 June 2010	list
(386917) 2011 JX_{26}	20 March 2010	list
(386937) 2011 OM_{23}	17 May 2010	list
(387172) 2012 TE_{257}	15 February 2010	list
(387217) 2012 US_{3}	26 June 2010	list
(389415) 2010 AA_{136}	15 January 2010	list

(389417) 2010 BO_{34}	18 January 2010	list
(389419) 2010 BD_{68}	22 January 2010	list
(389423) 2010 CJ_{7}	6 February 2010	list
(389424) 2010 CZ_{8}	8 February 2010	list
(389426) 2010 CK_{17}	11 February 2010	list
(389433) 2010 CG_{54}	14 February 2010	list
(389452) 2010 CA_{228}	9 February 2010	list
(389455) 2010 DQ_{18}	16 February 2010	list
(389461) 2010 DY_{63}	26 February 2010	list
(389478) 2010 ER_{87}	21 January 2010	list
(389523) 2010 HW_{96}	30 April 2010	list
(389527) 2010 JF_{38}	25 January 2010	list
(389530) 2010 JC_{63}	8 May 2010	list
(389531) 2010 JP_{68}	9 May 2010	list
(389534) 2010 JS_{77}	31 January 2010	list
(389540) 2010 KH_{66}	24 May 2010	list
(389541) 2010 KH_{110}	29 May 2010	list
(389543) 2010 LY_{36}	6 June 2010	list
(389544) 2010 LZ_{82}	11 June 2010	list
(389547) 2010 MH_{89}	27 June 2010	list
(389548) 2010 OY_{67}	24 July 2010	list
(389557) 2010 UB_{12}	27 July 2010	list
(389566) 2010 VN_{138}	10 August 2010	list
(389578) 2011 AP_{73}	1 February 2010	list
(389647) 2011 MR_{4}	13 March 2010	list

(389695) 2011 QJ_{49}	31 March 2010	list
(389753) 2011 SM_{164}	23 April 2010	list
(389762) 2011 SY_{202}	18 February 2010	list
(389784) 2011 UC_{29}	15 June 2010	list
(389802) 2011 UW_{221}	15 May 2010	list
(390236) 2012 XT_{55}	8 January 2010	list
(390248) 2012 XF_{87}	7 February 2010	list
(390255) 2012 XU_{114}	24 April 2010	list
(390321) 2013 AL_{170}	7 May 2010	list
(390340) 2013 CD_{77}	29 January 2010	list
(390359) 2013 CO_{209}	16 July 2010	list
(390439) 2013 YT_{65}	6 March 2010	list
(390444) 2013 YQ_{69}	20 January 2010	list
(390476) 2013 YJ_{132}	15 January 2010	list
(392278) 2010 AJ_{89}	8 January 2010	list
(392279) 2010 AB_{110}	12 January 2010	list
(392282) 2010 BX_{29}	18 January 2010	list
(392286) 2010 CJ_{17}	11 February 2010	list
(392300) 2010 CJ_{132}	15 February 2010	list
(392312) 2010 DB_{55}	21 February 2010	list
(392313) 2010 DT_{64}	26 February 2010	list
(392315) 2010 ES_{7}	3 March 2010	list
(392373) 2010 HA_{32}	19 April 2010	list
(392374) 2010 HS_{64}	26 April 2010	list
(392375) 2010 HK_{78}	12 February 2010	list

(392392) 2010 JQ_{127}	13 May 2010	list
(392393) 2010 JJ_{147}	30 January 2010	list
(392400) 2010 KZ_{81}	26 May 2010	list
(392407) 2010 LK_{78}	10 June 2010	list
(392408) 2010 LE_{86}	11 June 2010	list
(392409) 2010 LW_{97}	13 June 2010	list
(392412) 2010 LG_{127}	15 June 2010	list
(392414) 2010 LU_{131}	15 June 2010	list
(392417) 2010 MW_{63}	24 June 2010	list
(392419) 2010 MT_{80}	26 June 2010	list
(392420) 2010 MX_{82}	27 June 2010	list
(392421) 2010 MK_{86}	27 June 2010	list
(392423) 2010 NB_{14}	5 July 2010	list
(392424) 2010 NF_{81}	15 July 2010	list
(392426) 2010 NZ_{116}	14 July 2010	list
(392428) 2010 OQ_{45}	22 July 2010	list
(392429) 2010 OJ_{51}	22 July 2010	list
(392430) 2010 OG_{76}	27 July 2010	list
(392431) 2010 OE_{107}	29 July 2010	list
(392433) 2010 OF_{119}	3 February 2010	list
(392509) 2011 PE_{12}	14 January 2010	list
(392524) 2011 QT_{43}	11 March 2010	list
(392531) 2011 QH_{66}	12 January 2010	list
(392586) 2011 SU_{188}	10 April 2010	list
(392591) 2011 SQ_{201}	29 July 2010	list

(392600) 2011 SK_{226}	22 July 2010	list
(392614) 2011 TM_{10}	1 February 2010	list
(392625) 2011 US_{35}	9 April 2010	list
(392642) 2011 UV_{130}	19 May 2010	list
(392669) 2011 UR_{305}	22 April 2010	list
(392672) 2011 UA_{322}	12 April 2010	list
(392694) 2011 WR_{54}	20 May 2010	list
(392697) 2011 WK_{115}	12 March 2010	list
(392712) 2012 BX_{136}	2 February 2010	list
(392718) 2012 KN	15 January 2010	list
(392789) 2012 TS_{163}	16 January 2010	list
(392979) 2012 XW_{46}	15 January 2010	list
(393051) 2013 AL_{46}	23 April 2010	list
(393091) 2013 AF_{109}	12 June 2010	list
(393181) 2013 CH_{100}	15 June 2010	list
(393232) 2013 JP_{26}	25 July 2010	list
(393268) 2013 WA_{53}	20 February 2010	list
(393313) 2014 AZ_{3}	12 January 2010	list
(393315) 2014 AB_{24}	29 January 2010	list
(393338) 2014 BN_{44}	31 January 2010	list
(395138) 2010 AQ_{107}	12 January 2010	list
(395143) 2010 CN_{1}	2 February 2010	list
(395149) 2010 CX_{44}	11 February 2010	list
(395150) 2010 CP_{47}	12 February 2010	list
(395158) 2010 CP_{136}	15 February 2010	list

(395171) 2010 DW_{55}	22 February 2010	list
(395172) 2010 EC_{11}	3 March 2010	list
(395197) 2010 GN_{113}	20 January 2010	list
(395205) 2010 HD_{38}	21 April 2010	list
(395206) 2010 HV_{56}	25 April 2010	list
(395207) 2010 HQ_{80}	25 April 2010	list
(395208) 2010 JR_{17}	3 May 2010	list
(395209) 2010 JS_{19}	3 May 2010	list
(395212) 2010 JM_{68}	9 May 2010	list
(395216) 2010 JO_{89}	9 May 2010	list
(395220) 2010 KK_{110}	29 May 2010	list
(395222) 2010 LE_{53}	9 June 2010	list
(395224) 2010 LT_{79}	10 June 2010	list
(395225) 2010 LV_{98}	13 June 2010	list
(395228) 2010 MW_{19}	18 June 2010	list
(395230) 2010 MD_{27}	19 June 2010	list
(395232) 2010 MB_{65}	24 June 2010	list
(395233) 2010 MX_{67}	25 June 2010	list
(395234) 2010 MU_{72}	26 June 2010	list
(395241) 2010 NB_{65}	11 July 2010	list
(395245) 2010 NL_{113}	13 July 2010	list
(395247) 2010 OF_{12}	17 July 2010	list
(395249) 2010 OD_{27}	19 July 2010	list
(395250) 2010 OS_{86}	27 July 2010	list
(395276) 2010 UM_{75}	7 August 2010	list

(395330) 2011 QQ_{16}	14 June 2010	list
(395476) 2011 UW_{35}	1 March 2010	list
(395503) 2011 UQ_{102}	19 May 2010	list
(395520) 2011 UJ_{134}	17 May 2010	list
(395540) 2011 UC_{161}	23 May 2010	list
(395577) 2011 UH_{255}	20 May 2010	list
(395584) 2011 UR_{282}	19 May 2010	list
(395610) 2011 UH_{362}	24 May 2010	list
(395629) 2011 VZ_{11}	24 May 2010	list
(395634) 2011 WY_{11}	11 May 2010	list
(395648) 2011 WE_{42}	21 May 2010	list
(395654) 2011 WN_{51}	31 May 2010	list
(395685) 2011 YQ	18 May 2010	list
(395688) 2011 YG_{21}	31 July 2010	list
(395691) 2011 YE_{59}	14 July 2010	list
(395693) 2012 AM_{11}	2 July 2010	list
(396004) 2013 BW_{59}	13 April 2010	list
(396018) 2013 BH_{80}	12 June 2010	list
(396038) 2013 CH_{23}	21 April 2010	list
(396052) 2013 CY_{41}	20 July 2010	list
(396066) 2013 CD_{71}	15 June 2010	list
(396220) 2014 AH	5 April 2010	list
(396335) 2014 DW_{60}	30 March 2010	list
(396341) 2014 DX_{67}	21 January 2010	list
(396407) 2014 EJ_{7}	27 January 2010	list

(396463) 2014 FU_{23}	21 June 2010	list
(396470) 2014 FV_{35}	12 July 2010	list
(396512) 2014 GL_{11}	15 April 2010	list
(396520) 2014 GJ_{18}	20 February 2010	list
(398123) 2010 BF_{59}	21 January 2010	list
(398124) 2010 BE_{72}	23 January 2010	list
(398126) 2010 CO_{52}	14 February 2010	list
(398135) 2010 CO_{134}	15 February 2010	list
(398167) 2010 GQ_{81}	12 April 2010	list
(398173) 2010 HZ_{24}	18 April 2010	list
(398174) 2010 HT_{37}	21 April 2010	list
(398175) 2010 HW_{97}	30 April 2010	list
(398180) 2010 JE_{105}	12 May 2010	list
(398184) 2010 KX_{60}	25 May 2010	list
(398186) 2010 KY_{119}	30 May 2010	list
398188 Agni	3 June 2010	list
(398193) 2010 MR_{8}	16 June 2010	list
(398194) 2010 ME_{20}	18 June 2010	list
(398195) 2010 MZ_{25}	19 June 2010	list
(398196) 2010 MJ_{30}	20 June 2010	list
(398197) 2010 MR_{31}	20 June 2010	list
(398198) 2010 MN_{64}	25 June 2010	list
(398199) 2010 MF_{72}	26 June 2010	list
(398200) 2010 MR_{74}	26 June 2010	list
(398202) 2010 MC_{100}	29 June 2010	list

(398203) 2010 MX_{105}	30 June 2010	list
(398204) 2010 MU_{108}	30 June 2010	list
(398205) 2010 MO_{115}	30 June 2010	list
(398208) 2010 NX_{31}	7 July 2010	list
(398210) 2010 NQ_{87}	2 July 2010	list
(398212) 2010 NF_{105}	12 July 2010	list
(398213) 2010 NV_{105}	12 July 2010	list
(398214) 2010 NY_{106}	12 July 2010	list
(398217) 2010 OD_{16}	17 July 2010	list
(398220) 2010 OZ_{71}	25 July 2010	list
(398222) 2010 OR_{89}	27 July 2010	list
(398223) 2010 OW_{119}	31 July 2010	list
(398224) 2010 OH_{125}	31 July 2010	list
(398227) 2010 PV_{68}	9 August 2010	list
(398236) 2010 RD_{52}	10 July 2010	list
(398289) 2010 VU_{16}	23 July 2010	list
(398448) 2011 UD_{54}	7 June 2010	list
(398487) 2011 UJ_{153}	19 April 2010	list
(398500) 2011 UN_{187}	24 April 2010	list
(398508) 2011 UF_{242}	7 May 2010	list
(398543) 2011 UY_{326}	25 May 2010	list
(398546) 2011 UA_{338}	16 April 2010	list
(398554) 2011 UC_{388}	22 May 2010	list
(398565) 2011 VL_{21}	26 May 2010	list
(398596) 2011 WM_{95}	26 May 2010	list

(398600) 2011 WK_{104}	2 May 2010	list
(398619) 2011 YC_{38}	12 July 2010	list
(398630) 2012 BP_{144}	27 June 2010	list
(398705) 2012 XM_{46}	14 June 2010	list
(398747) 2013 AO_{24}	22 June 2010	list
(398781) 2013 AR_{117}	13 April 2010	list
(398801) 2013 BP_{11}	15 January 2010	list
(398912) 2013 CN_{150}	11 June 2010	list
(398984) 2013 EA_{82}	25 June 2010	list
(398997) 2013 EQ_{128}	25 May 2010	list
(399005) 2013 GZ_{8}	22 July 2010	list
(399008) 2013 GH_{11}	25 July 2010	list
(399034) 2013 HM_{23}	22 July 2010	list
(399093) 2014 DL_{34}	13 January 2010	list
(399129) 2014 EB	11 March 2010	list
(399149) 2014 ES_{45}	26 February 2010	list
(399265) 2014 HT_{47}	19 June 2010	list
(399293) 2014 HF_{151}	23 April 2010	list
(400757) 2010 BK_{96}	27 January 2010	list
(400771) 2010 DC_{16}	17 February 2010	list
(400773) 2010 DH_{52}	21 February 2010	list
(400774) 2010 EG_{14}	5 March 2010	list
400796 Douglass	31 March 2010	list
(400799) 2010 GW_{15}	3 April 2010	list
(400811) 2010 GF_{153}	15 April 2010	list

(400816) 2010 HQ_{101}	30 April 2010	list
(400824) 2010 JM_{109}	12 May 2010	list
(400825) 2010 JP_{110}	10 February 2010	list
(400829) 2010 KB_{32}	19 May 2010	list
(400831) 2010 KT_{78}	26 May 2010	list
(400832) 2010 KT_{79}	25 May 2010	list
(400833) 2010 KR_{103}	29 May 2010	list
(400835) 2010 KY_{120}	31 May 2010	list
(400836) 2010 LB_{38}	6 June 2010	list
(400837) 2010 LP_{41}	7 June 2010	list
(400838) 2010 LS_{51}	8 June 2010	list
(400839) 2010 LE_{60}	9 June 2010	list
(400841) 2010 LN_{75}	10 June 2010	list
(400842) 2010 LJ_{82}	11 June 2010	list
(400843) 2010 LQ_{101}	13 June 2010	list
(400845) 2010 LU_{129}	15 June 2010	list
(400847) 2010 MH_{11}	17 June 2010	list
(400848) 2010 MB_{20}	18 June 2010	list
(400849) 2010 MS_{21}	18 June 2010	list
(400852) 2010 MK_{38}	21 June 2010	list
(400853) 2010 MM_{102}	29 June 2010	list
(400856) 2010 MQ_{115}	1 July 2010	list
(400857) 2010 NJ_{36}	8 July 2010	list
(400860) 2010 NQ_{57}	10 July 2010	list
(400861) 2010 NA_{59}	11 July 2010	list

(400866) 2010 OD_{18}	18 July 2010	list
(400868) 2010 OT_{30}	20 July 2010	list
(400869) 2010 OM_{36}	21 July 2010	list
(400871) 2010 OC_{44}	22 July 2010	list
(400874) 2010 OD_{89}	27 July 2010	list
(400875) 2010 OF_{93}	28 July 2010	list
(400876) 2010 OA_{107}	29 July 2010	list
(400877) 2010 OT_{120}	31 July 2010	list
(400880) 2010 PW_{53}	8 August 2010	list
(400895) 2010 RN_{102}	8 July 2010	list
(400934) 2010 UP_{94}	26 June 2010	list
(400962) 2010 VF_{213}	27 July 2010	list
(401014) 2011 SV_{4}	16 June 2010	list
(401067) 2011 UP_{54}	21 May 2010	list
(401077) 2011 UM_{101}	19 April 2010	list
(401079) 2011 UY_{102}	27 May 2010	list
(401091) 2011 UW_{152}	8 July 2010	list
(401170) 2011 WQ_{63}	1 June 2010	list
(401181) 2011 WL_{102}	4 May 2010	list
(401182) 2011 WD_{103}	8 June 2010	list
(401214) 2011 YF_{44}	2 July 2010	list
(401216) 2011 YF_{45}	21 June 2010	list
(401239) 2012 BA_{18}	16 June 2010	list
(401368) 2013 BO_{63}	29 May 2010	list
(401371) 2013 BR_{66}	8 February 2010	list

(401436) 2013 CE_{116}	9 June 2010	list
(401446) 2013 CY_{135}	27 January 2010	list
(401454) 2013 CE_{152}	16 March 2010	list
(401494) 2013 DG_{16}	17 July 2010	list
(401596) 2013 GY_{20}	14 July 2010	list
(401611) 2013 GO_{34}	29 July 2010	list
(401612) 2013 GV_{37}	11 May 2010	list
(403520) 2010 CS_{6}	6 February 2010	list
(403542) 2010 HR_{8}	17 April 2010	list
(403543) 2010 HG_{17}	18 April 2010	list
(403546) 2010 HQ_{98}	30 April 2010	list
(403551) 2010 JX_{68}	9 May 2010	list
(403556) 2010 KU_{58}	22 May 2010	list
(403557) 2010 KR_{88}	27 May 2010	list
(403558) 2010 LZ_{4}	1 June 2010	list
403563 Ledbetter	13 June 2010	list
(403564) 2010 MV_{33}	21 June 2010	list
(403565) 2010 ML_{60}	24 June 2010	list
(403570) 2010 NK_{42}	9 July 2010	list
(403574) 2010 NM_{97}	11 July 2010	list
(403577) 2010 NV_{114}	14 July 2010	list
(403580) 2010 OW_{33}	20 July 2010	list
(403582) 2010 OQ_{59}	24 July 2010	list
(403664) 2010 TT_{127}	10 July 2010	list
(403945) 2012 BW_{30}	28 June 2010	list

(403997) 2012 BX_{131}	30 July 2010	list
(403998) 2012 BD_{132}	28 June 2010	list
(404056) 2012 DE_{17}	25 July 2010	list
(404065) 2012 DQ_{39}	18 January 2010	list
(404073) 2012 DE_{69}	29 July 2010	list
(404091) 2012 FO_{9}	14 January 2010	list
(404163) 2013 CG_{70}	16 March 2010	list
(404219) 2013 CR_{184}	10 June 2010	list
(404428) 2013 GX_{92}	28 May 2010	list
(404567) 2013 JB_{54}	17 June 2010	list
(404588) 2013 LE_{35}	26 February 2010	list
(404712) 2014 JH_{7}	12 July 2010	list
(404766) 2014 JN_{42}	8 May 2010	list
(404806) 2014 JJ_{63}	14 June 2010	list
(404839) 2014 JC_{78}	13 June 2010	list
(404860) 2014 KO_{20}	30 July 2010	list
(404875) 2014 KX_{53}	25 July 2010	list
(404879) 2014 KD_{56}	26 June 2010	list
(404902) 2014 KA_{86}	28 April 2010	list
(404922) 2014 LZ_{12}	21 January 2010	list
(407267) 2010 CW_{54}	14 February 2010	list
(407272) 2010 DQ_{25}	20 February 2010	list
(407273) 2010 DU_{73}	28 February 2010	list
(407289) 2010 HV_{63}	26 April 2010	list
(407290) 2010 HH_{71}	27 April 2010	list

(407295) 2010 JY_{108}	12 May 2010	list
(407300) 2010 LL_{53}	9 June 2010	list
(407303) 2010 LA_{90}	12 June 2010	list
(407304) 2010 LM_{127}	15 June 2010	list
(407305) 2010 LO_{127}	15 June 2010	list
(407306) 2010 MJ_{7}	16 June 2010	list
(407308) 2010 MA_{107}	30 June 2010	list
(407310) 2010 NW_{23}	6 July 2010	list
(407312) 2010 NR_{53}	10 July 2010	list
(407313) 2010 NG_{58}	10 July 2010	list
(407315) 2010 NC_{115}	14 July 2010	list
(407316) 2010 OJ_{3}	16 July 2010	list
(407317) 2010 OJ_{24}	19 July 2010	list
(407319) 2010 OR_{76}	25 July 2010	list
(407323) 2010 OM_{98}	28 July 2010	list
(407324) 2010 OB_{101}	18 July 2010	list
(407325) 2010 OS_{121}	31 July 2010	list
(407326) 2010 PQ_{54}	8 August 2010	list
(407327) 2010 PT_{55}	8 August 2010	list
(407375) 2010 RL_{149}	16 June 2010	list
(407586) 2011 AD_{48}	21 January 2010	list
(407616) 2011 CP_{1}	22 January 2010	list
(407703) 2011 UG_{136}	5 March 2010	list
(407828) 2012 BX_{15}	21 June 2010	list
(407855) 2012 BV_{64}	29 June 2010	list

(408006) 2012 DG_{94}	6 July 2010	list
(408102) 2013 AN_{89}	11 May 2010	list
(408112) 2013 CL_{5}	10 February 2010	list
(408128) 2013 CW_{54}	22 July 2010	list
(408145) 2013 CM_{107}	30 March 2010	list
(408160) 2013 CA_{151}	29 May 2010	list
(408180) 2013 DG_{7}	6 July 2010	list
(408483) 2013 HF_{138}	7 August 2010	list
(408518) 2013 JZ_{37}	27 January 2010	list
(408574) 2013 LA_{7}	22 January 2010	list
(408642) 2014 MT_{9}	3 July 2010	list
(408676) 2014 MK_{38}	15 June 2010	list
(411155) 2010 AP_{110}	13 January 2010	list
(411157) 2010 AY_{134}	15 January 2010	list
(411160) 2010 BP_{31}	18 January 2010	list
(411162) 2010 BW_{95}	27 January 2010	list
(411166) 2010 DU_{18}	16 February 2010	list
(411184) 2010 HU_{10}	17 April 2010	list
(411185) 2010 HE_{48}	24 April 2010	list
(411190) 2010 JF_{66}	9 May 2010	list
(411193) 2010 JE_{148}	27 January 2010	list
(411195) 2010 KW_{3}	16 May 2010	list
(411196) 2010 KU_{47}	21 May 2010	list
(411197) 2010 KJ_{110}	29 May 2010	list
(411198) 2010 KD_{116}	30 May 2010	list

(411202) 2010 LU_{17}	3 June 2010	list
(411204) 2010 LZ_{51}	8 June 2010	list
(411205) 2010 LV_{79}	11 June 2010	list
(411211) 2010 NU_{14}	1 July 2010	list
(411212) 2010 NV_{22}	6 July 2010	list
(411214) 2010 NC_{63}	11 July 2010	list
(411215) 2010 NP_{68}	14 July 2010	list
(411218) 2010 NS_{103}	12 July 2010	list
(411219) 2010 OE_{14}	17 July 2010	list
(411221) 2010 OV_{28}	19 July 2010	list
(411225) 2010 OZ_{86}	28 January 2010	list
(411227) 2010 OV_{108}	29 July 2010	list
(411289) 2010 TR_{14}	12 July 2010	list
(411339) 2010 UY_{56}	14 July 2010	list
(411509) 2011 BG_{15}	18 January 2010	list
(411532) 2011 BK_{101}	25 January 2010	list
(411540) 2011 BK_{122}	27 January 2010	list
(411592) 2011 ED_{77}	11 February 2010	list
(411597) 2011 FU_{73}	2 March 2010	list
(411599) 2011 FA_{127}	31 January 2010	list
(411606) 2011 GP_{86}	28 February 2010	list
(411612) 2011 QE_{31}	15 May 2010	list
(411645) 2011 UH_{311}	31 March 2010	list
(411868) 2012 EE	26 July 2010	list
(411875) 2012 EW_{4}	25 January 2010	list

(411978) 2012 HN_{66}	1 February 2010	list
(411985) 2012 JF_{16}	11 March 2010	list
(412006) 2012 MU	26 March 2010	list
(412032) 2013 CJ_{113}	27 January 2010	list
(412067) 2013 EJ_{92}	7 May 2010	list
(412119) 2013 GU_{25}	20 May 2010	list
(412181) 2013 GO_{96}	16 May 2010	list
(412219) 2013 GP_{115}	18 May 2010	list
(412319) 2013 JT_{63}	28 May 2010	list
(412461) 2014 HG_{1}	21 January 2010	list
(412508) 2014 KN_{90}	20 May 2010	list
(412525) 2014 MH_{37}	25 May 2010	list
(412556) 2014 NC_{44}	13 January 2010	list
(412570) 2014 NQ_{60}	20 January 2010	list
(412608) 2014 OS_{94}	24 July 2010	list
(412616) 2014 OG_{101}	25 February 2010	list
(412623) 2014 OT_{109}	27 June 2010	list
(412634) 2014 OU_{171}	29 July 2010	list
(412668) 2014 OK_{197}	13 February 2010	list
(412710) 2014 OY_{295}	26 March 2010	list
(412729) 2014 OG_{344}	19 January 2010	list
(412741) 2014 OE_{360}	21 January 2010	list
(412759) 2014 OJ_{380}	8 July 2010	list
(412963) 2014 QS_{300}	27 January 2010	list
(414745) 2010 EX_{13}	5 March 2010	list

(414746) 2010 EH_{20}	6 March 2010	list
(414747) 2010 EL_{28}	9 March 2010	list
(414750) 2010 FV_{73}	30 March 2010	list
(414755) 2010 GK_{92}	14 April 2010	list
(414762) 2010 KZ_{104}	29 May 2010	list
(414767) 2010 MC_{27}	19 June 2010	list
(414769) 2010 NV_{21}	6 July 2010	list
(414770) 2010 OZ_{30}	20 July 2010	list
(414772) 2010 OC_{103}	28 July 2010	list
(414775) 2010 PN_{56}	8 August 2010	list
(415009) 2011 GE_{67}	15 March 2010	list
(415031) 2011 WC_{13}	27 February 2010	list
(415181) 2012 FF_{78}	17 February 2010	list
(415204) 2012 HZ_{14}	27 January 2010	list
(415384) 2013 MZ_{9}	18 March 2010	list
(415391) 2013 NM_{12}	16 January 2010	list
(415512) 2014 PH_{56}	20 June 2010	list
(415524) 2014 QF_{32}	4 April 2010	list
(415590) 2014 QX_{309}	3 May 2010	list
(415608) 2014 QB_{353}	20 February 2010	list
(415623) 2014 QM_{367}	16 February 2010	list
(419419) 2010 AR_{103}	12 January 2010	list
(419420) 2010 AY_{103}	12 January 2010	list
(419426) 2010 BU_{6}	16 January 2010	list
(419427) 2010 BD_{8}	16 January 2010	list

(419474) 2010 DN_{32}	18 February 2010	list
(419480) 2010 DC_{52}	21 February 2010	list
(419486) 2010 EK_{16}	6 March 2010	list
(419506) 2010 GE_{11}	2 April 2010	list
(419515) 2010 HS_{10}	17 April 2010	list
(419516) 2010 HN_{14}	18 April 2010	list
(419517) 2010 HU_{22}	25 April 2010	list
(419518) 2010 HS_{27}	19 April 2010	list
(419519) 2010 HZ_{100}	30 April 2010	list
(419523) 2010 JA_{65}	8 May 2010	list
(419524) 2010 JV_{80}	10 May 2010	list
(419526) 2010 JH_{123}	13 May 2010	list
(419527) 2010 KN_{4}	16 May 2010	list
(419529) 2010 KL_{73}	25 May 2010	list
(419530) 2010 KF_{78}	25 May 2010	list
(419531) 2010 KT_{88}	27 May 2010	list
(419532) 2010 KM_{94}	27 May 2010	list
(419533) 2010 KJ_{104}	29 May 2010	list
(419535) 2010 LS_{4}	1 June 2010	list
(419536) 2010 LE_{82}	11 June 2010	list
(419537) 2010 MO_{6}	16 June 2010	list
(419538) 2010 MF_{14}	17 June 2010	list
(419539) 2010 MA_{65}	25 June 2010	list
(419542) 2010 NX_{21}	6 July 2010	list
(419543) 2010 OC_{4}	16 July 2010	list

(419544) 2010 OX_{34}	20 July 2010	list
(419549) 2010 OZ_{83}	26 July 2010	list
(419550) 2010 OM_{90}	27 July 2010	list
(419551) 2010 OM_{106}	29 July 2010	list
(419552) 2010 OF_{118}	30 July 2010	list
(419554) 2010 PA_{52}	8 August 2010	list
(419624) 2010 SO16	17 September 2010	list
(419858) 2011 AC_{13}	1 February 2010	list
(419880) 2011 AH_{37}	7 January 2011	list
(419916) 2011 BC_{13}	26 January 2010	list
(419957) 2011 BW_{99}	16 February 2010	list
(419960) 2011 BW_{100}	1 March 2010	list
(420020) 2011 CX_{81}	4 February 2010	list
(420058) 2011 DQ_{42}	1 March 2010	list
(420068) 2011 EG_{18}	5 February 2010	list
(420084) 2011 EX_{49}	19 February 2010	list
(420092) 2011 EJ_{59}	14 March 2010	list
(420117) 2011 FL_{22}	27 February 2010	list
(420124) 2011 FP_{36}	17 March 2010	list
(420160) 2011 FA_{155}	7 May 2010	list
(420190) 2011 GM_{60}	28 March 2010	list
(420198) 2011 GS_{69}	29 April 2010	list
(420243) 2011 HE_{68}	8 May 2010	list
(420252) 2011 JP_{8}	19 April 2010	list
(420253) 2011 JV_{9}	30 March 2010	list

(420263) 2011 KO_{14}	29 March 2010	list
(420266) 2011 KZ_{19}	11 April 2010	list
(420271) 2011 KG_{43}	13 April 2010	list
(420281) 2011 OH_{52}	29 March 2010	list
(420313) 2011 YQ_{62}	18 April 2010	list
(420613) 2012 HK_{61}	26 March 2010	list
(420626) 2012 HF_{72}	4 March 2010	list
(420661) 2012 JY_{28}	19 February 2010	list
(420700) 2012 KW_{47}	2 February 2010	list
(420703) 2012 LB_{5}	15 March 2010	list
(420720) 2012 PD_{23}	28 May 2010	list
(420733) 2012 SU_{34}	12 January 2010	list
(420748) 2012 UM_{140}	27 April 2010	list
(420819) 2013 HG_{92}	20 May 2010	list
(420834) 2013 JX_{10}	7 July 2010	list
(420914) 2013 MA_{7}	25 March 2010	list
(420937) 2013 OR_{8}	4 February 2010	list
(420940) 2013 OO_{10}	10 March 2010	list
(420960) 2013 PM_{10}	19 February 2010	list
(420973) 2013 PM_{24}	16 April 2010	list
(421007) 2013 PJ_{49}	1 March 2010	list
(421072) 2013 QO_{26}	25 March 2010	list
(421145) 2013 RP_{26}	6 April 2010	list
(421161) 2013 RV_{42}	29 March 2010	list
(421201) 2013 RE_{90}	10 April 2010	list

(421358) 2013 TJ_{111}	13 May 2010	list
(421418) 2013 WG_{51}	1 June 2010	list
(422098) 2014 QC_{402}	12 January 2010	list
(422102) 2014 QU_{406}	31 January 2010	list
(422149) 2014 QV_{438}	11 March 2010	list
(422170) 2014 RZ_{16}	12 February 2010	list
(422175) 2014 RJ_{19}	23 July 2010	list
(422251) 2014 SU_{102}	7 July 2010	list
(422313) 2014 SF_{177}	21 May 2010	list
(422335) 2014 SA_{216}	4 April 2010	list
(422502) 2014 TK_{3}	4 August 2010	list
(422557) 2014 TZ_{36}	13 April 2010	list
(422588) 2014 TY_{62}	10 February 2010	list
(422598) 2014 TY_{69}	9 July 2010	list
(425336) 2010 AL_{93}	8 January 2010	list
(425337) 2010 AR_{105}	12 January 2010	list
(425339) 2010 AX_{110}	13 January 2010	list
(425340) 2010 AE_{111}	13 January 2010	list
(425341) 2010 AN_{124}	14 January 2010	list
(425345) 2010 BD_{22}	17 January 2010	list
(425346) 2010 BP_{25}	17 January 2010	list
(425347) 2010 BP_{32}	18 January 2010	list
(425350) 2010 BQ_{42}	19 January 2010	list
(425351) 2010 BP_{43}	19 January 2010	list
(425354) 2010 BC_{53}	20 January 2010	list

(425357) 2010 BX_{65}	22 January 2010	list
(425359) 2010 BM_{75}	24 January 2010	list
(425369) 2010 CF_{6}	6 February 2010	list
(425370) 2010 CQ_{6}	6 February 2010	list
(425382) 2010 CA_{45}	11 February 2010	list
(425383) 2010 CR_{47}	12 February 2010	list
(425434) 2010 DO_{51}	21 February 2010	list
(425435) 2010 DU_{56}	23 February 2010	list
(425491) 2010 GL_{25}	23 January 2010	list
(425494) 2010 GC_{67}	13 January 2010	list
(425495) 2010 GF_{67}	12 January 2010	list
(425501) 2010 GA_{125}	11 February 2010	list
(425506) 2010 HB_{41}	22 April 2010	list
(425509) 2010 JM_{34}	26 January 2010	list
(425511) 2010 JR_{61}	8 May 2010	list
(425513) 2010 JA_{84}	21 February 2010	list
(425517) 2010 KK_{54}	23 May 2010	list
(425519) 2010 LL_{11}	2 June 2010	list
(425522) 2010 MS_{26}	19 June 2010	list
(425523) 2010 MR_{82}	27 June 2010	list
(425526) 2010 NV_{42}	9 July 2010	list
(425527) 2010 ND_{110}	13 July 2010	list
(425529) 2010 OK_{44}	21 July 2010	list
(425532) 2010 OY_{95}	28 July 2010	list
(425534) 2010 OZ_{111}	29 July 2010	list

(425535) 2010 OJ_{121}	31 July 2010	list
(425724) 2011 BJ_{45}	26 January 2010	list
(425784) 2011 CP_{71}	21 January 2010	list
(425891) 2011 FP_{48}	16 May 2010	list
(425899) 2011 FJ_{84}	27 February 2010	list
(425904) 2011 FL_{104}	14 March 2010	list
(425963) 2011 HL_{22}	14 March 2010	list
(425973) 2011 HL_{60}	19 April 2010	list
(425978) 2011 HL_{72}	3 May 2010	list
(426002) 2011 JE_{13}	16 May 2010	list
(426004) 2011 JB_{31}	4 April 2010	list
(426016) 2011 KL_{35}	19 May 2010	list
(426017) 2011 KO_{42}	30 April 2010	list
(426019) 2011 KC_{45}	26 May 2010	list
(426020) 2011 LO	2 June 2010	list
(426026) 2011 MH_{2}	1 February 2010	list
(426029) 2011 PA_{2}	23 February 2010	list
(426232) 2012 OL_{2}	18 May 2010	list
(426239) 2012 PD_{10}	27 June 2010	list
(426243) 2012 PE_{17}	18 January 2010	list
(426244) 2012 PB_{18}	5 June 2010	list
(426249) 2012 PS_{33}	11 May 2010	list
(426254) 2012 QP	18 April 2010	list
(426266) 2012 QB_{43}	25 May 2010	list
(426313) 2012 TD_{224}	14 January 2010	list

(426333) 2012 VG_{39}	13 February 2010	list
(426342) 2013 GG_{12}	7 April 2010	list
(426356) 2013 MD_{5}	18 April 2010	list
(426380) 2013 PF_{16}	18 March 2010	list
(426443) 2013 QK_{46}	9 April 2010	list
(426513) 2013 RZ_{43}	28 March 2010	list
(426528) 2013 RZ_{56}	12 April 2010	list
(426550) 2013 RC_{87}	23 April 2010	list
(426707) 2013 TS_{34}	8 January 2010	list
(426713) 2013 TE_{41}	21 March 2010	list
(426787) 2013 TY_{127}	29 April 2010	list
(426800) 2013 TH_{134}	4 May 2010	list
(426807) 2013 TT_{137}	26 March 2010	list
(426830) 2013 VD_{1}	23 June 2010	list
(426834) 2013 VG_{3}	12 June 2010	list
(426895) 2013 WT_{58}	18 March 2010	list
(426898) 2013 WC_{62}	30 May 2010	list
(426928) 2013 XB_{9}	25 April 2010	list
(426952) 2013 YT_{25}	26 June 2010	list
(426974) 2013 YH_{133}	23 June 2010	list
(427146) 2014 UQ_{155}	30 March 2010	list
(427167) 2014 UC_{197}	8 July 2010	list
(427177) 2014 UX_{215}	21 March 2010	list
(427291) 2014 WP_{241}	9 April 2010	list
(427331) 2014 WA_{324}	6 March 2010	list

(427350) 2014 WE_{392}	31 March 2010	list
(427353) 2014 WS_{400}	11 March 2010	list
(427356) 2014 WQ_{406}	29 March 2010	list
(429243) 2010 AF_{86}	8 January 2010	list
(429244) 2010 AF_{89}	8 January 2010	list
(429245) 2010 AQ_{105}	12 January 2010	list
(429246) 2010 AW_{105}	12 January 2010	list
(429247) 2010 AR_{107}	12 January 2010	list
(429248) 2010 AW_{125}	14 January 2010	list
(429250) 2010 BP_{15}	17 January 2010	list
(429251) 2010 BJ_{25}	17 January 2010	list
(429252) 2010 BU_{36}	18 January 2010	list
(429253) 2010 BF_{61}	21 January 2010	list
(429256) 2010 BW_{71}	23 January 2010	list
(429257) 2010 BM_{73}	23 January 2010	list
(429261) 2010 BE_{81}	25 January 2010	list
(429264) 2010 CO_{14}	10 February 2010	list
(429265) 2010 CW_{15}	10 February 2010	list
(429270) 2010 CZ_{50}	13 February 2010	list
(429281) 2010 CQ_{132}	15 February 2010	list
(429298) 2010 CB_{220}	8 February 2010	list
(429299) 2010 CV_{229}	9 February 2010	list
(429301) 2010 DC_{14}	17 February 2010	list
(429302) 2010 DU_{16}	16 February 2010	list
(429304) 2010 DA_{19}	16 February 2010	list

(429305) 2010 DH_{21}	17 February 2010	list
(429316) 2010 EU_{70}	13 January 2010	list
(429322) 2010 EF_{86}	14 January 2010	list
(429354) 2010 GE_{28}	31 January 2010	list
(429358) 2010 GS_{73}	14 April 2010	list
(429361) 2010 GF_{121}	22 January 2010	list
(429362) 2010 GQ_{122}	28 January 2010	list
(429371) 2010 JH_{75}	3 February 2010	list
(429373) 2010 JP_{114}	9 February 2010	list
(429378) 2010 LZ_{31}	6 June 2010	list
(429383) 2010 OV_{62}	29 January 2010	list
(429384) 2010 ON_{70}	29 January 2010	list
(429385) 2010 OM_{79}	31 January 2010	list
(429386) 2010 ON_{86}	1 February 2010	list
(429570) 2011 DZ_{37}	28 January 2010	list
(429585) 2011 EQ_{36}	13 February 2010	list
(429597) 2011 EO_{71}	19 March 2010	list
(429661) 2011 GK_{55}	13 March 2010	list
(429698) 2011 HK_{58}	13 March 2010	list
(429699) 2011 HX_{62}	14 March 2010	list
(429708) 2011 HA_{95}	10 April 2010	list
(429711) 2011 HB_{101}	28 March 2010	list
(429724) 2011 KA_{14}	28 February 2010	list
(429744) 2011 QN_{53}	22 January 2010	list
(429745) 2011 QC_{66}	29 January 2010	list

(429747) 2011 SM_{61}	16 February 2010	list
(429849) 2012 QC_{51}	10 June 2010	list
(429869) 2012 ST_{19}	17 January 2010	list
(429960) 2012 VD_{29}	11 February 2010	list
(429972) 2013 AR_{131}	25 July 2010	list
(430059) 2013 SN_{26}	3 February 2010	list
(430069) 2013 SF_{37}	29 March 2010	list
(430073) 2013 SQ_{42}	14 April 2010	list
(430156) 2013 TA_{70}	14 March 2010	list
(430253) 2013 WD_{22}	12 May 2010	list
(430269) 2013 WQ_{46}	26 March 2010	list
(430271) 2013 WJ_{48}	24 May 2010	list
(430300) 2013 WL_{97}	15 January 2010	list
(430318) 2013 YT_{11}	13 February 2010	list
(432424) 2010 AS_{82}	7 January 2010	list
(432425) 2010 AP_{93}	8 January 2010	list
(432426) 2010 AR_{97}	9 January 2010	list
(432428) 2010 AH_{108}	12 January 2010	list
(432429) 2010 BQ_{43}	19 January 2010	list
(432430) 2010 BH_{51}	20 January 2010	list
(432431) 2010 BW_{56}	20 January 2010	list
(432432) 2010 BY_{63}	21 January 2010	list
(432433) 2010 BV_{75}	24 January 2010	list
(432434) 2010 BH_{78}	25 January 2010	list
(432436) 2010 BF_{81}	25 January 2010	list

(432437) 2010 BN_{91}	26 January 2010	list
(432439) 2010 BY_{123}	31 January 2010	list
(432440) 2010 CV_{8}	8 February 2010	list
(432441) 2010 CC_{10}	8 February 2010	list
(432446) 2010 CC_{45}	11 February 2010	list
(432447) 2010 CX_{47}	12 February 2010	list
(432459) 2010 CZ_{136}	15 February 2010	list
(432471) 2010 DX_{27}	18 February 2010	list
(432472) 2010 DP_{33}	20 February 2010	list
(432473) 2010 DU_{33}	20 February 2010	list
(432476) 2010 DA_{54}	23 February 2010	list
(432477) 2010 DB_{56}	23 February 2010	list
(432478) 2010 DJ_{58}	24 February 2010	list
(432479) 2010 DK_{59}	24 February 2010	list
(432480) 2010 DZ_{65}	27 February 2010	list
(432481) 2010 DE_{70}	28 February 2010	list
(432482) 2010 DU_{71}	26 February 2010	list
(432503) 2010 EW_{152}	11 March 2010	list
(432536) 2010 GB_{129}	15 January 2010	list
(432539) 2010 GK_{132}	25 January 2010	list
(432540) 2010 GT_{156}	27 January 2010	list
(432541) 2010 HE	23 January 2010	list
(432554) 2010 JR_{47}	17 February 2010	list
(432558) 2010 JQ_{79}	14 February 2010	list
(432563) 2010 JJ_{89}	10 May 2010	list

(432565) 2010 JK_{115}	25 January 2010	list
(432571) 2010 NY_{38}	8 July 2010	list
(432572) 2010 OR_{47}	29 January 2010	list
(432573) 2010 OJ_{48}	22 July 2010	list
(432575) 2010 OV_{57}	2 February 2010	list
(432576) 2010 OB_{62}	24 July 2010	list
(432577) 2010 OZ_{67}	30 January 2010	list
(432578) 2010 OR_{75}	25 July 2010	list
(432579) 2010 OX_{83}	31 January 2010	list
(432580) 2010 OF_{84}	2 February 2010	list
(432581) 2010 OF_{99}	30 January 2010	list
(432582) 2010 OV_{104}	31 January 2010	list
(432756) 2011 EU_{80}	18 January 2010	list
(432799) 2011 GR_{7}	15 March 2010	list
(432807) 2011 GE_{42}	1 February 2010	list
(432836) 2011 HM_{34}	8 February 2010	list
(432874) 2011 JG_{26}	8 March 2010	list
(432900) 2011 OG_{34}	29 May 2010	list
(432911) 2011 QL_{42}	4 August 2010	list
(432912) 2011 QG_{49}	19 January 2010	list
(432919) 2011 SZ_{51}	2 March 2010	list
(432926) 2011 SP_{231}	28 January 2010	list
(432931) 2011 US_{23}	9 May 2010	list
432971 Loving	11 February 2010	list
(433001) 2012 QM_{29}	15 June 2010	list

(433143) 2012 TC_{230}	8 February 2010	list
(433178) 2012 TW_{307}	12 January 2010	list
(433195) 2012 UR_{34}	18 January 2010	list
(433239) 2012 VK_{65}	2 June 2010	list
(433276) 2013 AX_{100}	18 January 2010	list
(433290) 2013 BW_{80}	16 January 2010	list
(433432) 2013 TJ_{97}	27 April 2010	list
(433468) 2013 VR_{9}	18 April 2010	list
(433485) 2013 WJ_{8}	2 February 2010	list
(433519) 2013 WU_{69}	17 June 2010	list
(433555) 2013 XF_{11}	18 January 2010	list
(433567) 2013 YH_{15}	13 January 2010	list
(433575) 2013 YY_{28}	24 February 2010	list
(433584) 2013 YZ_{35}	11 April 2010	list
(433631) 2013 YP_{133}	10 February 2010	list
(433660) 2014 BL_{28}	17 June 2010	list
(433667) 2014 DN_{18}	8 March 2010	list
(433670) 2014 DD_{32}	18 January 2010	list
(433705) 2014 WE_{491}	9 March 2010	list
(433776) 2015 BS_{63}	25 June 2010	list
(433782) 2015 BT_{71}	13 February 2010	list
(433843) 2015 BA_{253}	14 May 2010	list
(433852) 2015 BO_{274}	2 June 2010	list
(433860) 2015 BP_{291}	22 January 2010	list
(436241) 2010 AM_{89}	8 January 2010	list

(436242) 2010 AH_{90}	8 January 2010	list
(436248) 2010 BW_{65}	21 January 2010	list
(436250) 2010 BR_{75}	24 January 2010	list
(436253) 2010 BE_{90}	26 January 2010	list
(436260) 2010 CM_{7}	6 February 2010	list
(436261) 2010 CF_{8}	7 February 2010	list
(436262) 2010 CB_{11}	9 February 2010	list
(436285) 2010 CA_{214}	6 February 2010	list
(436287) 2010 CZ_{227}	9 February 2010	list
(436288) 2010 CW_{230}	10 February 2010	list
(436289) 2010 DV_{12}	15 February 2010	list
(436290) 2010 DV_{30}	20 February 2010	list
(436291) 2010 DL_{31}	20 February 2010	list
(436297) 2010 DX_{52}	22 February 2010	list
(436298) 2010 DG_{61}	25 February 2010	list
(436299) 2010 EF_{5}	2 March 2010	list
(436300) 2010 EA_{11}	2 March 2010	list
(436301) 2010 EP_{11}	3 March 2010	list
(436328) 2010 GV_{58}	10 April 2010	list
(436329) 2010 GX_{62}	16 January 2010	list
(436333) 2010 GD_{145}	12 April 2010	list
(436336) 2010 HA_{14}	18 April 2010	list
(436338) 2010 HM_{40}	22 April 2010	list
(436339) 2010 HY_{42}	22 April 2010	list
(436345) 2010 JZ_{18}	3 May 2010	list

(436349) 2010 JK_{77}	21 January 2010	list
(436353) 2010 JC_{112}	10 February 2010	list
(436356) 2010 JX_{130}	14 May 2010	list
(436359) 2010 KE_{2}	16 May 2010	list
(436360) 2010 KS_{19}	17 May 2010	list
(436361) 2010 KA_{31}	19 May 2010	list
(436365) 2010 KG_{125}	31 May 2010	list
(436368) 2010 LS_{55}	9 June 2010	list
(436369) 2010 LV_{69}	10 June 2010	list
(436370) 2010 ME_{115}	30 June 2010	list
(436373) 2010 OT_{41}	30 January 2010	list
(436374) 2010 OY_{60}	23 July 2010	list
(436375) 2010 OA_{77}	25 July 2010	list
(436377) 2010 OF_{106}	3 February 2010	list
(436379) 2010 OT_{117}	30 July 2010	list
(436380) 2010 PB_{70}	9 August 2010	list
(436388) 2010 VP_{48}	16 January 2010	list
(436526) 2011 FJ_{132}	20 January 2010	list
(436554) 2011 HF_{3}	29 March 2010	list
(436634) 2011 PE_{7}	2 August 2010	list
(436649) 2011 QX_{98}	29 July 2010	list
(436661) 2011 SX_{28}	1 March 2010	list
(436699) 2011 SS_{274}	21 February 2010	list
(436701) 2011 ST_{275}	16 April 2010	list
(436704) 2011 TO_{10}	30 March 2010	list

(436705) 2011 TB_{11}	3 April 2010	list
(436706) 2011 TZ_{12}	4 April 2010	list
(436738) 2011 UN_{405}	20 April 2010	list
(436742) 2011 VG_{16}	25 March 2010	list
(436746) 2011 WV_{23}	19 May 2010	list
(436758) 2012 AD_{6}	18 January 2010	list
(436891) 2012 TT_{40}	7 April 2010	list
(436958) 2012 TE_{157}	27 January 2010	list
(436964) 2012 TK_{169}	25 June 2010	list
(436991) 2012 TQ_{214}	26 January 2010	list
(437049) 2012 UK_{28}	14 January 2010	list
(437055) 2012 UA_{39}	3 August 2010	list
(437094) 2012 UU_{86}	2 June 2010	list
(437096) 2012 UZ_{88}	16 February 2010	list
(437184) 2012 VE_{91}	23 February 2010	list
(437210) 2012 WB_{12}	10 May 2010	list
(437222) 2012 WM_{30}	16 February 2010	list
(437245) 2012 XC_{29}	3 August 2010	list
(437291) 2013 BP_{2}	29 July 2010	list
(437303) 2013 CJ_{15}	29 May 2010	list
(437344) 2013 TR_{23}	15 February 2010	list
(437356) 2013 TS_{130}	13 June 2010	list
(437372) 2013 VM_{15}	4 March 2010	list
(437415) 2013 WD_{102}	13 February 2010	list
(437465) 2013 YO_{31}	15 June 2010	list

(437499) 2013 YE_{72}	8 June 2010	list
(437539) 2013 YF_{119}	12 February 2010	list
(437542) 2013 YP_{123}	16 February 2010	list
(437587) 2014 AC_{47}	18 February 2010	list
(437598) 2014 BS_{2}	18 February 2010	list
(437606) 2014 BF_{11}	25 March 2010	list
(437675) 2014 CX_{16}	4 April 2010	list
(437696) 2014 DP_{31}	21 May 2010	list
(437698) 2014 DA_{36}	9 April 2010	list
(437745) 2014 EY_{43}	18 June 2010	list
(437781) 2015 CS_{2}	25 May 2010	list
(437800) 2015 CP_{56}	4 February 2010	list
(438914) 2010 BU_{65}	21 January 2010	list
(438916) 2010 CY_{13}	10 February 2010	list
(438931) 2010 EB_{139}	10 January 2010	list
(438937) 2010 GL_{155}	15 April 2010	list
(438940) 2010 HP_{48}	24 April 2010	list
(438941) 2010 HY_{56}	25 April 2010	list
(438946) 2010 JG_{135}	14 May 2010	list
(438952) 2010 KA_{105}	29 May 2010	list
(438954) 2010 LK_{10}	2 June 2010	list
(438956) 2010 LQ_{17}	3 June 2010	list
(438957) 2010 LN_{60}	10 June 2010	list
(438959) 2010 LR_{83}	11 June 2010	list
(438960) 2010 LO_{86}	11 June 2010	list

(438962) 2010 LA_{97}	13 June 2010	list
(438963) 2010 LG_{114}	13 June 2010	list
(438967) 2010 MT_{14}	17 June 2010	list
(438968) 2010 ME_{57}	24 June 2010	list
(438969) 2010 MJ_{71}	25 June 2010	list
(438971) 2010 MJ_{97}	28 June 2010	list
(438972) 2010 MW_{101}	29 June 2010	list
438973 Masci	2 July 2010	list
(438975) 2010 NY_{53}	10 July 2010	list
(438976) 2010 NY_{54}	10 July 2010	list
(438979) 2010 OM_{56}	23 July 2010	list
(438983) 2010 PT_{52}	8 August 2010	list
(439073) 2011 KR_{11}	1 April 2010	list
(439096) 2011 SH_{11}	9 April 2010	list
(439108) 2011 SL_{69}	17 April 2010	list
(439128) 2011 SK_{222}	11 April 2010	list
(439149) 2011 UN_{147}	24 June 2010	list
(439155) 2011 UO_{248}	8 April 2010	list
(439165) 2011 UC_{343}	17 April 2010	list
(439169) 2011 UQ_{404}	17 January 2010	list
(439171) 2011 VZ_{2}	8 July 2010	list
(439172) 2011 VX_{9}	18 May 2010	list
(439176) 2011 WD_{38}	12 May 2010	list
(439179) 2011 WU_{62}	12 June 2010	list
(439181) 2011 WB_{90}	18 June 2010	list

(439192) 2012 AZ_{1}	7 June 2010	list
(439263) 2012 TT_{313}	15 June 2010	list
(439283) 2012 UQ_{77}	13 May 2010	list
(439298) 2012 VL_{17}	7 June 2010	list
(439352) 2012 XU_{82}	21 January 2010	list
(439373) 2013 AS_{12}	8 May 2010	list
(439428) 2013 EG_{77}	18 July 2010	list
(439445) 2013 WF_{44}	26 March 2010	list
(439462) 2013 YX_{42}	15 January 2010	list
(439495) 2014 AS_{11}	11 April 2010	list
(439524) 2014 BE_{51}	7 May 2010	list
(439579) 2014 DQ_{105}	4 July 2010	list
(439630) 2014 FJ_{30}	27 February 2010	list
(439642) 2014 GE_{37}	22 May 2010	list
(439674) 2014 HT_{187}	8 June 2010	list
(439696) 2014 KP_{10}	26 June 2010	list
439718 Danielcervantes	12 April 2010	list
(439759) 2015 FN_{336}	29 May 2010	list
(441876) 2010 AV_{133}	15 January 2010	list
(441878) 2010 BK_{13}	16 January 2010	list
(441879) 2010 BC_{74}	23 January 2010	list
(441880) 2010 CX_{9}	8 February 2010	list
(441894) 2010 DT_{25}	19 February 2010	list
(441895) 2010 EM	1 March 2010	list
(441920) 2010 GW_{145}	16 January 2010	list

(441921) 2010 HB_{5}	16 April 2010	list
(441922) 2010 HK_{45}	23 April 2010	list
(441923) 2010 HA_{70}	27 April 2010	list
(441925) 2010 JK_{3}	30 January 2010	list
(441926) 2010 JL_{13}	2 May 2010	list
(441935) 2010 JZ_{77}	10 February 2010	list
(441939) 2010 JG_{133}	14 May 2010	list
(441942) 2010 KB_{35}	19 May 2010	list
(441944) 2010 KZ_{78}	25 May 2010	list
(441945) 2010 KZ_{79}	25 May 2010	list
(441946) 2010 KR_{95}	28 May 2010	list
(441947) 2010 LE_{12}	2 June 2010	list
(441948) 2010 LD_{17}	2 June 2010	list
(441951) 2010 LB_{57}	9 June 2010	list
(441952) 2010 LR_{68}	8 June 2010	list
(441953) 2010 LZ_{69}	9 June 2010	list
(441954) 2010 LY_{72}	10 June 2010	list
(441955) 2010 LL_{78}	10 June 2010	list
(441956) 2010 LM_{86}	11 June 2010	list
(441957) 2010 LD_{100}	13 June 2010	list
(441958) 2010 LR_{101}	13 June 2010	list
(441959) 2010 LR_{116}	14 June 2010	list
(441960) 2010 LV_{117}	14 June 2010	list
(441961) 2010 MN_{6}	16 June 2010	list
(441963) 2010 MB_{24}	18 June 2010	list

(441966) 2010 MN_{37}	21 June 2010	list
(441969) 2010 MO_{70}	25 June 2010	list
(441970) 2010 MK_{72}	25 June 2010	list
(441971) 2010 MT_{77}	26 June 2010	list
(441972) 2010 MS_{79}	26 June 2010	list
(441973) 2010 MN_{81}	27 June 2010	list
(441974) 2010 MQ_{92}	28 June 2010	list
(441976) 2010 MW_{108}	30 June 2010	list
(441977) 2010 MJ_{110}	30 June 2010	list
(441978) 2010 MC_{111}	30 June 2010	list
(441979) 2010 ND_{22}	6 July 2010	list
(441980) 2010 NT_{23}	6 July 2010	list
(441984) 2010 NX_{43}	9 July 2010	list
(441985) 2010 NP_{53}	10 July 2010	list
(441986) 2010 NG_{63}	11 July 2010	list
(441987) 2010 NY_{65}	14 July 2010	list
(441988) 2010 NS_{71}	14 July 2010	list
(441989) 2010 NA_{81}	16 July 2010	list
(441990) 2010 NC_{84}	1 July 2010	list
(441991) 2010 NO_{84}	1 July 2010	list
(441992) 2010 NG_{86}	1 July 2010	list
(441994) 2010 NX_{103}	12 July 2010	list
(441996) 2010 OY_{5}	16 July 2010	list
(441998) 2010 OK_{6}	16 July 2010	list
(442000) 2010 OL_{14}	17 July 2010	list

(442001) 2010 OH_{15}	17 July 2010	list
(442002) 2010 OX_{17}	18 July 2010	list
(442005) 2010 OY_{23}	19 July 2010	list
(442006) 2010 OQ_{26}	19 July 2010	list
(442010) 2010 OE_{43}	22 July 2010	list
(442011) 2010 OK_{55}	23 July 2010	list
(442012) 2010 OL_{67}	24 July 2010	list
(442014) 2010 OC_{70}	25 July 2010	list
(442015) 2010 OS_{73}	25 July 2010	list
(442020) 2010 OB_{103}	29 July 2010	list
(442023) 2010 OV_{115}	30 July 2010	list
(442025) 2010 OG_{117}	30 July 2010	list
(442026) 2010 OZ_{119}	31 July 2010	list
(442029) 2010 PZ_{4}	1 August 2010	list
(442032) 2010 PH_{19}	4 August 2010	list
(442033) 2010 PV_{27}	5 August 2010	list
(442037) 2010 PR_{66}	22 July 2010	list
(442038) 2010 PG_{69}	9 August 2010	list
(442099) 2010 TD_{69}	6 July 2010	list
(442135) 2010 UK_{69}	21 July 2010	list
(442137) 2010 UQ_{82}	9 August 2010	list
(442147) 2010 VK_{59}	6 August 2010	list
(442264) 2011 QP_{35}	12 July 2010	list
(442309) 2011 SC_{73}	3 July 2010	list
(442417) 2011 UX_{112}	28 April 2010	list

(442512) 2011 WQ_{65}	24 June 2010	list
(442517) 2011 WM_{83}	8 May 2010	list
(442538) 2011 WJ_{151}	9 April 2010	list
(442539) 2011 YM_{9}	13 June 2010	list
(442540) 2011 YR_{12}	10 May 2010	list
(442544) 2011 YE_{33}	14 June 2010	list
(442548) 2011 YR_{42}	22 June 2010	list
(442551) 2011 YO_{59}	12 July 2010	list
(442570) 2012 BG_{30}	15 July 2010	list
(442579) 2012 BQ_{87}	23 July 2010	list
(442581) 2012 BU_{93}	19 July 2010	list
(442584) 2012 BB_{103}	13 August 2010	list
(442585) 2012 BH_{103}	14 July 2010	list
(442589) 2012 CZ_{7}	6 August 2010	list
(442592) 2012 CS_{25}	6 August 2010	list
(442597) 2012 DN_{7}	8 August 2010	list
(442602) 2012 DE_{56}	26 June 2010	list
(442692) 2012 UC_{61}	8 April 2010	list
(442742) 2012 WP_{3}	22 March 2010	list
(442821) 2013 AR_{63}	28 May 2010	list
(442862) 2013 AN_{162}	15 April 2010	list
(442865) 2013 AP_{171}	1 May 2010	list
(442892) 2013 BX_{63}	7 June 2010	list
(442932) 2013 CY_{64}	13 July 2010	list
(442936) 2013 CL_{71}	25 May 2010	list

(442954) 2013 CL_{115}	27 July 2010	list
(442968) 2013 CG_{134}	7 July 2010	list
(443002) 2013 CO_{193}	1 June 2010	list
(443006) 2013 CX_{195}	1 August 2010	list
(443020) 2013 EX_{10}	28 June 2010	list
(443054) 2013 ES_{126}	30 June 2010	list
(443056) 2013 FG_{6}	14 July 2010	list
(443266) 2014 EJ_{18}	8 February 2010	list
(443330) 2014 FD_{67}	7 July 2010	list
(443369) 2014 HG	9 July 2010	list
(443378) 2014 HQ_{6}	24 June 2010	list
(443390) 2014 HD_{20}	5 May 2010	list
(443420) 2014 HC_{78}	29 May 2010	list
(443444) 2014 HA_{160}	29 June 2010	list
(443449) 2014 HG_{162}	12 July 2010	list
(443474) 2014 JZ_{6}	7 June 2010	list
(443493) 2014 JB_{26}	25 June 2010	list
(443540) 2014 KT_{3}	12 March 2010	list
(443585) 2014 KL_{73}	30 June 2010	list
(443593) 2014 KJ_{91}	9 July 2010	list
(443619) 2014 MM_{2}	21 February 2010	list
(443624) 2014 ML_{34}	22 July 2010	list
(443742) 2015 LX_{33}	24 June 2010	list
(443745) 2015 LB_{35}	15 January 2010	list
(443746) 2015 LE_{35}	15 May 2010	list

(443754) 2015 MK_{8}	18 June 2010	list
(443769) 2015 MQ_{56}	22 June 2010	list
(443774) 2015 MK_{65}	14 June 2010	list
(443784) 2015 ML_{74}	24 May 2010	list
(443785) 2015 MH_{78}	24 June 2010	list
(443793) 2015 MO_{93}	23 May 2010	list
(445296) 2010 AN_{104}	12 January 2010	list
(445297) 2010 BJ_{87}	26 January 2010	list
(445303) 2010 CR_{131}	14 February 2010	list
(445305) 2010 DM_{56}	18 February 2010	list
(445307) 2010 EY_{8}	4 March 2010	list
(445319) 2010 FN_{72}	30 March 2010	list
(445326) 2010 GK_{72}	13 April 2010	list
(445332) 2010 JD_{43}	2 February 2010	list
(445339) 2010 KR_{101}	28 May 2010	list
(445340) 2010 LT_{48}	8 June 2010	list
(445341) 2010 LU_{63}	28 February 2010	list
(445342) 2010 LM_{74}	10 June 2010	list
(445343) 2010 LB_{97}	13 June 2010	list
(445344) 2010 MQ_{23}	18 June 2010	list
(445346) 2010 MS_{71}	25 June 2010	list
(445347) 2010 MQ_{76}	26 June 2010	list
(445348) 2010 MY_{84}	27 June 2010	list
(445349) 2010 MU_{107}	30 June 2010	list
(445350) 2010 MY_{110}	30 June 2010	list

(445352) 2010 NS_{23}	7 July 2010	list
(445355) 2010 NO_{88}	2 July 2010	list
(445356) 2010 NA_{98}	12 July 2010	list
(445357) 2010 NA_{104}	12 July 2010	list
(445358) 2010 NG_{113}	13 July 2010	list
(445360) 2010 OB_{21}	18 July 2010	list
(445362) 2010 OV_{33}	20 July 2010	list
(445364) 2010 OK_{59}	24 July 2010	list
(445366) 2010 OE_{98}	28 July 2010	list
(445367) 2010 OF_{112}	30 July 2010	list
(445368) 2010 OU_{120}	31 July 2010	list
(445372) 2010 PO_{27}	4 August 2010	list
(445374) 2010 PZ_{36}	6 August 2010	list
(445375) 2010 PG_{48}	7 August 2010	list
(445376) 2010 PC_{55}	8 August 2010	list
(445392) 2010 SU_{2}	27 July 2010	list
(445426) 2010 UJ_{10}	31 July 2010	list
(445439) 2010 UM_{65}	26 July 2010	list
(445453) 2010 VT_{5}	27 July 2010	list
(445456) 2010 VF_{15}	8 August 2010	list
(445779) 2011 YU_{32}	20 July 2010	list
(445790) 2012 AY_{4}	7 August 2010	list
(445793) 2012 AO_{21}	22 July 2010	list
(445804) 2012 BJ_{67}	26 July 2010	list
(445815) 2012 BF_{117}	27 July 2010	list

(445818) 2012 BR_{128}	25 July 2010	list
(445820) 2012 BQ_{131}	6 August 2010	list
(445837) 2012 DO_{7}	9 August 2010	list
(445972) 2013 BE_{9}	27 June 2010	list
(445976) 2013 BV_{21}	19 April 2010	list
(446158) 2013 EK_{115}	4 August 2010	list
(446178) 2013 FC_{6}	3 July 2010	list
(446305) 2014 EH_{17}	31 January 2010	list
(446324) 2014 FC_{49}	22 January 2010	list
(446386) 2014 HH_{155}	10 July 2010	list
(446440) 2014 JU_{44}	28 February 2010	list
(446446) 2014 JE_{49}	7 May 2010	list
(446469) 2014 JY_{78}	22 April 2010	list
(446480) 2014 KX_{18}	28 July 2010	list
(446481) 2014 KW_{19}	21 April 2010	list
(446581) 2014 OM_{223}	25 January 2010	list
(446595) 2015 LO_{23}	22 May 2010	list
(446600) 2015 MF_{8}	27 May 2010	list
(446601) 2015 MU_{8}	28 June 2010	list
(446617) 2015 MM_{78}	15 June 2010	list
(446637) 2015 MG_{118}	26 June 2010	list
(446665) 2015 NM_{17}	9 June 2010	list
(446676) 2015 OS_{2}	8 July 2010	list
(446678) 2015 OT_{9}	12 June 2010	list
(446698) 2015 OM_{25}	6 July 2010	list

(446701) 2015 OX_{27}	30 June 2010	list
(446731) 2015 OF_{74}	19 June 2010	list
(446743) 2015 PS_{1}	23 June 2010	list
(446744) 2015 PZ_{1}	24 April 2010	list
(446753) 2015 PF_{5}	8 July 2010	list
(446758) 2015 PS_{30}	29 July 2010	list
(446763) 2015 PN_{34}	12 March 2010	list
(448448) 2010 DU_{57}	24 February 2010	list
(448482) 2010 HJ_{55}	25 April 2010	list
(448484) 2010 JQ_{68}	9 May 2010	list
(448491) 2010 JM_{135}	14 May 2010	list
(448495) 2010 KD_{49}	22 May 2010	list
(448496) 2010 KX_{119}	31 May 2010	list
(448498) 2010 LK_{31}	6 June 2010	list
(448500) 2010 LM_{77}	10 June 2010	list
(448501) 2010 LO_{82}	11 June 2010	list
(448502) 2010 LZ_{112}	23 February 2010	list
(448503) 2010 LW_{116}	14 June 2010	list
(448504) 2010 LE_{119}	14 June 2010	list
(448506) 2010 MZ_{45}	23 June 2010	list
(448507) 2010 MY_{82}	27 June 2010	list
(448508) 2010 MX_{84}	27 June 2010	list
(448509) 2010 ME_{100}	29 June 2010	list
(448510) 2010 MF_{102}	29 June 2010	list
(448511) 2010 NU_{13}	2 July 2010	list

(448513) 2010 NU_{45}	9 July 2010	list
(448514) 2010 NV_{46}	9 July 2010	list
(448515) 2010 NH_{56}	10 July 2010	list
(448516) 2010 OG_{3}	16 July 2010	list
(448517) 2010 OP_{10}	17 July 2010	list
(448518) 2010 OV_{15}	17 July 2010	list
(448519) 2010 ON_{23}	18 July 2010	list
(448520) 2010 OA_{43}	21 July 2010	list
(448521) 2010 OL_{49}	22 July 2010	list
(448523) 2010 OM_{59}	23 July 2010	list
(448524) 2010 OO_{73}	25 July 2010	list
(448525) 2010 OM_{89}	27 July 2010	list
(448529) 2010 OO_{111}	30 July 2010	list
(448535) 2010 PY_{36}	6 August 2010	list
(448536) 2010 PP_{51}	8 August 2010	list
(448538) 2010 PO_{68}	9 August 2010	list
(448539) 2010 PW_{70}	10 August 2010	list
(448583) 2010 TQ_{38}	14 June 2010	list
(448632) 2010 VR_{28}	9 August 2010	list
(448673) 2010 VJ_{197}	21 January 2010	list
(448716) 2011 AN_{65}	12 January 2010	list
(448718) 2011 AL_{72}	18 January 2010	list
(448723) 2011 BX_{30}	17 January 2010	list
(448725) 2011 BS_{50}	14 January 2010	list
(448764) 2011 QP_{97}	13 May 2010	list

(448780) 2011 SG_{118}	26 February 2010	list
(448781) 2011 SP_{130}	25 July 2010	list
(448835) 2011 US_{73}	14 May 2010	list
(448913) 2011 UK_{364}	7 April 2010	list
(448989) 2012 BK_{21}	20 July 2010	list
(449000) 2012 BY_{53}	30 July 2010	list
(449023) 2012 BT_{138}	17 July 2010	list
(449067) 2012 FN_{31}	25 July 2010	list
(449138) 2013 AV_{56}	17 April 2010	list
(449160) 2013 AH_{126}	27 January 2010	list
(449178) 2013 BG_{66}	31 May 2010	list
(449190) 2013 CM_{23}	10 April 2010	list
(449202) 2013 CR_{55}	7 May 2010	list
(449233) 2013 CJ_{136}	7 June 2010	list
(449337) 2013 GC_{1}	8 August 2010	list
(449341) 2013 GU_{6}	27 July 2010	list
(449397) 2013 GB_{124}	12 July 2010	list
(449401) 2013 GW_{132}	5 August 2010	list
(449420) 2013 HF_{45}	22 July 2010	list
(449447) 2013 JM_{21}	8 January 2010	list
(449463) 2013 LR_{11}	9 February 2010	list
(449470) 2014 CP_{21}	3 April 2010	list
(449544) 2014 HE_{146}	29 July 2010	list
(449625) 2014 KP_{3}	14 July 2010	list
(449630) 2014 KC_{17}	21 July 2010	list

(449639) 2014 KJ_{27}	9 June 2010	list
(449647) 2014 KK_{42}	19 July 2010	list
(449709) 2014 MH_{35}	29 July 2010	list
(449721) 2014 NU	13 July 2010	list
(449767) 2014 OX_{79}	12 June 2010	list
(449828) 2014 PZ_{56}	15 January 2010	list
(449843) 2014 QK_{418}	1 February 2010	list
(449850) 2014 UB_{213}	30 January 2010	list
449922 Bailey	9 June 2010	list
(449967) 2015 PA_{8}	13 April 2010	list
(449970) 2015 PV_{30}	6 August 2010	list
(449981) 2015 PQ_{75}	14 June 2010	list
(450019) 2015 QN	29 January 2010	list
(450021) 2015 QG_{2}	13 June 2010	list
(450047) 2015 RR_{25}	1 August 2010	list
(451221) 2010 BT_{27}	18 January 2010	list
(451222) 2010 BE_{67}	22 January 2010	list
(451230) 2010 CT_{214}	3 February 2010	list
(451253) 2010 KD_{31}	19 May 2010	list
(451254) 2010 KM_{74}	25 May 2010	list
(451255) 2010 KW_{82}	26 May 2010	list
(451256) 2010 LE_{47}	8 June 2010	list
(451257) 2010 LR_{55}	9 June 2010	list
(451258) 2010 LA_{84}	11 June 2010	list
(451259) 2010 LX_{91}	12 June 2010	list

(451261) 2010 MR_{22}	18 June 2010	list
(451262) 2010 NA_{14}	2 July 2010	list
(451263) 2010 NZ_{16}	3 July 2010	list
(451264) 2010 NK_{34}	8 July 2010	list
(451267) 2010 OP_{37}	21 July 2010	list
(451268) 2010 OW_{102}	28 July 2010	list
(451291) 2010 TB_{11}	11 July 2010	list
(451326) 2010 VP_{60}	7 August 2010	list
(451385) 2011 BY_{57}	11 February 2010	list
(451389) 2011 CT_{40}	14 January 2010	list
(451393) 2011 DQ_{10}	13 January 2010	list
(451489) 2011 UJ_{178}	16 April 2010	list
(451504) 2011 UZ_{262}	23 May 2010	list
(451514) 2011 UZ_{349}	13 June 2010	list
(451525) 2011 WV_{3}	12 June 2010	list
(451575) 2012 AC_{2}	28 June 2010	list
(451644) 2012 JJ_{16}	20 January 2010	list
(451689) 2013 BB_{76}	22 February 2010	list
(451911) 2014 KQ_{27}	31 May 2010	list
(451938) 2014 MF	2 April 2010	list
(451945) 2014 MU_{14}	13 March 2010	list
(451952) 2014 MS_{37}	13 January 2010	list
(451966) 2014 NC_{16}	28 January 2010	list
(452030) 2014 OP_{154}	7 July 2010	list
(452041) 2014 OG_{181}	9 July 2010	list

(452133) 2015 PT_{293}	19 May 2010	list
(452164) 2015 RY_{65}	3 June 2010	list
(452178) 2015 RZ_{88}	16 April 2010	list
(452180) 2015 RK_{89}	28 July 2010	list
(452253) 2015 TB_{117}	17 January 2010	list
(452256) 2015 TK_{120}	14 February 2010	list
(452293) 2015 TF_{225}	8 April 2010	list
(453580) 2010 HV_{37}	21 April 2010	list
(453582) 2010 HK_{61}	26 April 2010	list
(453583) 2010 HG_{71}	27 April 2010	list
(453585) 2010 HX_{97}	30 April 2010	list
(453587) 2010 JO_{91}	10 May 2010	list
(453588) 2010 JM_{94}	10 May 2010	list
(453590) 2010 JT_{131}	13 May 2010	list
(453592) 2010 KK_{57}	20 May 2010	list
(453594) 2010 LP_{51}	8 June 2010	list
(453595) 2010 LN_{74}	10 June 2010	list
(453596) 2010 LT_{101}	13 June 2010	list
(453597) 2010 MA_{8}	16 June 2010	list
(453598) 2010 MW_{84}	27 June 2010	list
(453599) 2010 MA_{99}	29 June 2010	list
(453600) 2010 MS_{106}	30 June 2010	list
(453606) 2010 NX_{11}	1 July 2010	list
(453607) 2010 NM_{17}	6 July 2010	list
(453609) 2010 NH_{112}	13 July 2010	list

(453610) 2010 OY_{54}	23 July 2010	list
(453611) 2010 OX_{59}	23 July 2010	list
(453613) 2010 OL_{93}	28 July 2010	list
(453632) 2010 SX_{35}	7 June 2010	list
(453665) 2010 UR_{48}	11 August 2010	list
(453687) 2010 VY_{190}	17 May 2010	list
(453719) 2011 AU_{43}	17 January 2010	list
(453730) 2011 BE_{43}	9 February 2010	list
(453751) 2011 CJ_{68}	8 February 2010	list
(453771) 2011 GX_{62}	20 March 2010	list
(453789) 2011 PH_{11}	1 April 2010	list
(453888) 2011 UA_{179}	5 March 2010	list
(453933) 2011 WQ_{129}	19 April 2010	list
(453955) 2012 AD_{24}	10 July 2010	list
(454140) 2013 DV_{12}	22 April 2010	list
(454154) 2013 EK_{87}	25 June 2010	list
(454223) 2013 JG_{18}	26 May 2010	list
(454241) 2013 LT_{1}	28 January 2010	list
(454243) 2013 LB_{7}	28 July 2010	list
(454288) 2014 JL_{2}	12 July 2010	list
(454299) 2014 JA_{37}	10 May 2010	list
(454302) 2014 JX_{41}	9 June 2010	list
(454305) 2014 JW_{64}	31 May 2010	list
(454314) 2014 KK_{6}	13 May 2010	list
454326 Donlee	17 May 2010	list

454329 Ericpiquette	10 June 2010	list
454350 Paolaamico	30 April 2010	list
454352 Majidzandian	3 July 2010	list
454409 Markusloose	25 May 2010	list
454419 Hansklausreif	21 May 2010	list
454505 Suntharalingam	20 January 2010	list
(454511) 2014 OJ_{197}	8 January 2010	list
(454540) 2014 OF_{334}	31 March 2010	list
(454564) 2014 PW_{5}	14 June 2010	list
(454593) 2014 PC_{44}	27 March 2010	list
(454598) 2014 PE_{57}	7 July 2010	list
(454609) 2014 QN_{30}	4 February 2010	list
(454678) 2014 QL_{410}	13 February 2010	list
(454719) 2014 SS_{222}	16 March 2010	list
(454737) 2014 UL_{18}	14 April 2010	list
(454754) 2014 VP_{15}	6 March 2010	list
(454780) 2014 XE_{6}	1 March 2010	list
(454781) 2014 XK_{11}	10 April 2010	list
(454792) 2015 PT_{10}	8 June 2010	list
(454798) 2015 QU_{10}	23 April 2010	list
(454858) 2015 SS_{12}	6 August 2010	list
(454866) 2015 TF_{13}	23 July 2010	list
(454890) 2015 TL_{80}	25 February 2010	list
(454931) 2015 TC_{159}	19 February 2010	list
(455037) 2015 UP	17 May 2010	list

(455105) 2015 UE_{81}	21 July 2010	list
(455123) 2015 VF_{39}	14 January 2010	list
(458093) 2010 AU_{91}	8 January 2010	list
(458094) 2010 AM_{95}	9 January 2010	list
(458097) 2010 BK_{56}	20 January 2010	list
(458121) 2010 EK_{7}	3 March 2010	list
(458131) 2010 FY_{5}	19 January 2010	list
(458135) 2010 GE_{25}	1 April 2010	list
(458138) 2010 HJ_{18}	18 April 2010	list
(458140) 2010 HX_{49}	24 April 2010	list
(458141) 2010 HV_{58}	25 April 2010	list
(458142) 2010 HS_{61}	26 April 2010	list
(458144) 2010 HQ_{95}	30 April 2010	list
(458145) 2010 JH_{1}	1 May 2010	list
(458150) 2010 JD_{57}	7 May 2010	list
(458156) 2010 JO_{124}	12 May 2010	list
(458162) 2010 KG_{50}	22 May 2010	list
(458163) 2010 KQ_{78}	26 May 2010	list
(458164) 2010 KF_{110}	30 May 2010	list
(458166) 2010 LB_{17}	2 June 2010	list
(458169) 2010 LR_{100}	13 June 2010	list
(458171) 2010 MK_{11}	17 June 2010	list
(458172) 2010 MP_{17}	17 June 2010	list
(458173) 2010 MH_{33}	21 June 2010	list
(458174) 2010 MT_{49}	23 June 2010	list

(458175) 2010 MW_{56}	24 June 2010	list
(458176) 2010 MM_{71}	25 June 2010	list
(458179) 2010 NQ_{4}	20 April 2010	list
(458180) 2010 NW_{22}	6 July 2010	list
(458181) 2010 NH_{26}	7 July 2010	list
(458183) 2010 NF_{50}	10 July 2010	list
(458184) 2010 NO_{69}	14 July 2010	list
(458185) 2010 NP_{69}	15 July 2010	list
(458187) 2010 NA_{77}	15 July 2010	list
(458188) 2010 NK_{80}	16 July 2010	list
(458190) 2010 OY_{92}	27 July 2010	list
(458191) 2010 OM_{97}	28 July 2010	list
(458192) 2010 PX_{10}	1 August 2010	list
(458193) 2010 PM_{16}	3 August 2010	list
(458216) 2010 RU_{112}	6 July 2010	list
(458246) 2010 TK_{56}	16 July 2010	list
(458260) 2010 TB_{166}	12 July 2010	list
(458267) 2010 UG_{15}	16 July 2010	list
(458274) 2010 UM_{32}	29 July 2010	list
(458311) 2010 VM_{60}	31 July 2010	list
(458319) 2010 VB_{95}	9 August 2010	list
(458463) 2011 BZ_{38}	10 February 2010	list
(458476) 2011 BS_{102}	4 February 2010	list
(458481) 2011 BX_{109}	27 January 2010	list
(458500) 2011 CE_{25}	14 January 2010	list

(458501) 2011 CL_{25}	3 February 2010	list
(458511) 2011 CG_{46}	9 February 2010	list
(458546) 2011 EU_{13}	15 March 2010	list
(458557) 2011 EC_{43}	9 February 2010	list
(458570) 2011 EY_{72}	16 March 2010	list
(458571) 2011 EE_{77}	17 January 2010	list
(458575) 2011 ES_{85}	7 March 2010	list
(458592) 2011 FL_{28}	19 March 2010	list
(458600) 2011 FJ_{43}	27 January 2010	list
(458613) 2011 FZ_{62}	25 February 2010	list
(458616) 2011 FH_{69}	6 March 2010	list
(458622) 2011 FG_{88}	17 February 2010	list
(458650) 2011 GS_{57}	31 March 2010	list
(458651) 2011 GC_{58}	27 February 2010	list
(458657) 2011 GO_{68}	27 March 2010	list
(458672) 2011 HK_{3}	13 April 2010	list
(458684) 2011 HK_{40}	26 April 2010	list
(458688) 2011 HS_{50}	28 April 2010	list
(458693) 2011 HU_{57}	8 April 2010	list
(458704) 2011 HA_{76}	9 March 2010	list
(458731) 2011 LR_{23}	31 May 2010	list
(458760) 2011 SD_{10}	14 March 2010	list
(459035) 2011 YD_{61}	25 April 2010	list
(459189) 2012 DU_{46}	2 July 2010	list
(459320) 2012 HL_{6}	1 March 2010	list

(459409) 2012 LY_{17}	16 February 2010	list
(459413) 2012 MO_{15}	10 April 2010	list
(459417) 2012 PY_{27}	4 April 2010	list
(459422) 2012 RA_{9}	1 April 2010	list
(459427) 2012 SG_{25}	11 April 2010	list
(459428) 2012 SC_{50}	13 April 2010	list
(459552) 2013 GN_{46}	4 August 2010	list
(459595) 2013 HF_{12}	25 July 2010	list
(459667) 2013 LC_{9}	18 May 2010	list
(459669) 2013 LT_{14}	5 July 2010	list
(459687) 2013 MX_{10}	11 February 2010	list
(459697) 2013 NV_{23}	17 March 2010	list
(459723) 2013 PA_{50}	18 February 2010	list
(459736) 2013 QA_{6}	6 May 2010	list
(459745) 2013 QS_{19}	20 February 2010	list
(459879) 2014 JH_{22}	27 May 2010	list
(459883) 2014 JX55	28 June 2010	list
(459903) 2014 MN_{11}	21 June 2010	list
(459912) 2014 MS_{22}	25 June 2010	list
(459919) 2014 MV_{38}	2 March 2010	list
(459936) 2014 NY_{2}	9 March 2010	list
(459997) 2014 OK_{71}	20 June 2010	list
(459998) 2014 OD_{73}	26 July 2014	list
(460005) 2014 OH_{103}	3 February 2010	list
(460044) 2014 OD_{192}	30 July 2010	list

(460050) 2014 OO_{197}	30 July 2010	list
(460051) 2014 OU_{197}	28 January 2010	list
(460074) 2014 OR_{295}	18 May 2010	list
(460102) 2014 PD_{7}	13 January 2010	list
(460127) 2014 PM_{40}	31 March 2010	list
(460138) 2014 PH_{54}	19 March 2010	list
(460144) 2014 PA_{57}	9 July 2010	list
(460154) 2014 QQ	1 April 2010	list
(460160) 2014 QN_{21}	27 January 2010	list
(460162) 2014 QY_{21}	31 January 2010	list
(460166) 2014 QY_{24}	18 July 2010	list
(460179) 2014 QL_{59}	17 May 2010	list
(460202) 2014 QT_{148}	2 April 2010	list
(460209) 2014 QX_{169}	12 January 2010	list
(460213) 2014 QN_{172}	24 February 2010	list
(460218) 2014 QO_{194}	26 January 2010	list
(460232) 2014 QY_{232}	25 July 2010	list
(460243) 2014 QN_{262}	14 February 2010	list
(460245) 2014 QS_{267}	27 June 2010	list
(460280) 2014 QK_{346}	5 August 2010	list
(460302) 2014 QP_{371}	30 April 2010	list
(460333) 2014 QY_{438}	12 March 2010	list
(460347) 2014 RD_{32}	16 July 2010	list
(460418) 2014 SO_{135}	28 March 2010	list
(460437) 2014 SC_{166}	20 February 2010	list

(460485) 2014 SJ_{301}	14 January 2010	list
(460488) 2014 SR_{304}	3 March 2010	list
(460502) 2014 SP_{317}	1 March 2010	list
(460504) 2014 SX_{323}	27 March 2010	list
(460507) 2014 SR_{330}	12 April 2010	list
(460515) 2014 SJ_{347}	14 March 2010	list
(460520) 2014 TJ_{9}	15 February 2010	list
(460529) 2014 TW_{26}	17 March 2010	list
(460538) 2014 TW_{40}	20 April 2010	list
(460555) 2014 TC_{62}	1 April 2010	list
(460604) 2014 UO_{50}	12 March 2010	list
(460608) 2014 UB_{57}	28 February 2010	list
(460620) 2014 UF_{84}	3 March 2010	list
(460643) 2014 US_{117}	9 April 2010	list
(460679) 2014 UJ_{172}	20 March 2010	list
(460699) 2014 UP_{202}	2 March 2010	list
(460717) 2014 VT_{3}	2 February 2010	list
(460730) 2014 VC_{13}	12 April 2010	list
(460736) 2014 VJ_{17}	13 March 2010	list
(460770) 2014 WH_{4}	16 April 2010	list
(460780) 2014 WP_{18}	18 April 2010	list
(460952) 2014 WZ_{267}	1 April 2010	list
(460959) 2014 WN_{279}	18 April 2010	list
(460960) 2014 WP_{280}	17 March 2010	list
(460968) 2014 WP_{298}	3 May 2010	list

(460975) 2014 WW_{322}	5 May 2010	list
(460978) 2014 WP_{327}	18 March 2010	list
(460986) 2014 WF_{340}	29 March 2010	list
(461066) 2014 YS_{23}	29 March 2010	list
(461091) 2015 AP_{273}	19 April 2010	list
(461096) 2015 BH_{62}	16 May 2010	list
(461101) 2015 BF_{114}	5 May 2010	list
(461104) 2015 BH_{214}	9 May 2010	list
(461123) 2015 OL_{22}	3 August 2010	list
(461132) 2015 TL_{77}	29 June 2010	list
(461175) 2015 US_{48}	16 January 2010	list
(461232) 2015 WJ_{4}	27 January 2010	list
(461279) 2015 XP_{65}	19 January 2010	list
(461307) 2015 XJ_{167}	14 March 2010	list
(462736) 2010 BL_{2}	8 January 2010	list
(462737) 2010 BF_{49}	20 January 2010	list
(462738) 2010 BV_{98}	27 January 2010	list
(462766) 2010 EP_{36}	13 January 2010	list
(462772) 2010 EU_{130}	12 January 2010	list
(462789) 2010 LY_{96}	13 June 2010	list
(462790) 2010 MH_{103}	30 June 2010	list
(462791) 2010 NG_{28}	7 July 2010	list
(462792) 2010 OP_{29}	19 July 2010	list
(462794) 2010 OM_{121}	30 July 2010	list
(462795) 2010 OV_{123}	31 July 2010	list

(462797) 2010 PY_{21}	4 August 2010	list
(462798) 2010 PD_{40}	6 August 2010	list
(462856) 2010 UR_{107}	22 July 2010	list
(462931) 2011 BD_{37}	16 January 2010	list
(462941) 2011 BQ_{107}	17 January 2010	list
(462969) 2011 ES_{38}	12 March 2010	list
(462978) 2011 EV_{78}	4 April 2010	list
(463018) 2011 GJ_{49}	17 March 2010	list
(463030) 2011 HV_{1}	12 March 2010	list
(463034) 2011 HR_{9}	10 April 2010	list
(463042) 2011 HX_{33}	28 April 2010	list
(463043) 2011 HN_{35}	25 April 2010	list
(463053) 2011 HC_{54}	11 May 2010	list
(463063) 2011 HE_{90}	13 March 2010	list
(463074) 2011 JT_{31}	16 April 2010	list
(463076) 2011 KD_{37}	16 April 2010	list
(463078) 2011 LW_{17}	6 May 2010	list
(463081) 2011 OA_{31}	4 February 2010	list
(463337) 2012 MH_{5}	28 March 2010	list
(463365) 2012 TU_{132}	23 May 2010	list
(463400) 2013 GP_{109}	17 May 2010	list
(463448) 2013 NA_{20}	28 February 2010	list
(463455) 2013 PS_{3}	27 February 2010	list
(463473) 2013 PA_{43}	26 January 2010	list
(463482) 2013 QR_{12}	3 May 2010	list

(463498) 2013 QO_{54}	6 April 2010	list
(463541) 2013 RW_{40}	26 April 2010	list
(463582) 2013 SL_{21}	19 May 2010	list
(463586) 2013 SG_{30}	7 May 2010	list
(463606) 2013 SS_{61}	21 January 2010	list
(463630) 2013 TD_{51}	27 May 2010	list
(463642) 2013 TD_{115}	1 June 2010	list
(463662) 2013 YO_{24}	18 May 2010	list
(463712) 2014 QM_{176}	6 August 2010	list
(463757) 2014 ST	11 April 2010	list
(463813) 2014 TS_{4}	27 March 2010	list
(463913) 2014 UP_{132}	16 April 2010	list
(464013) 2014 WH_{109}	15 June 2010	list
(464057) 2014 WL_{232}	20 March 2010	list
(464060) 2014 WW_{235}	18 March 2010	list
(464070) 2014 WT_{270}	28 April 2010	list
(464098) 2014 WY_{393}	16 July 2010	list
(464163) 2015 AB_{27}	28 April 2010	list
(464237) 2015 CO_{1}	1 June 2010	list
(464279) 2015 YY_{4}	7 February 2010	list
(464290) 2016 AH_{75}	11 March 2010	list
(464295) 2016 AS_{94}	7 April 2010	list
(464332) 2016 AU_{111}	29 July 2010	list
(464341) 2016 AH_{115}	9 August 2010	list
(464370) 2016 AP_{172}	12 March 2010	list

(464383) 2016 AH_{187}	9 March 2010	list
(464419) 2016 BY_{26}	3 March 2010	list
(464428) 2016 BN_{31}	8 February 2010	list
(464476) 2016 BA_{51}	10 February 2010	list
(464480) 2016 BV_{53}	20 July 2010	list
(464493) 2016 BB_{69}	8 February 2010	list
(464524) 2016 CR_{12}	6 March 2010	list
(464534) 2016 CZ_{19}	7 February 2010	list
(464543) 2016 CU_{32}	5 April 2010	list
(464556) 2016 CF_{43}	17 March 2010	list
(464564) 2016 CC_{50}	8 March 2010	list
(464578) 2016 CO_{72}	3 April 2010	list
(464597) 2016 CN_{119}	17 March 2010	list
(464613) 2016 CG_{141}	5 March 2010	list
(464616) 2016 CE_{175}	9 March 2010	list
(465787) 2010 AL_{100}	12 January 2010	list
(465788) 2010 AL_{128}	14 January 2010	list
(465790) 2010 BH_{9}	16 January 2010	list
(465791) 2010 BU_{34}	18 January 2010	list
(465792) 2010 BB_{37}	19 January 2010	list
(465793) 2010 BR_{66}	22 January 2010	list
(465827) 2010 GF_{134}	23 January 2010	list
(465831) 2010 JX_{10}	2 May 2010	list
(465832) 2010 JZ_{35}	13 January 2010	list
(465834) 2010 LQ_{30}	6 June 2010	list

(465835) 2010 LG_{53}	9 June 2010	list
(465837) 2010 ME_{45}	22 June 2010	list
(465838) 2010 MJ_{46}	23 June 2010	list
(465843) 2010 OV_{24}	19 July 2010	list
(465844) 2010 OW_{36}	21 July 2010	list
(465845) 2010 OK_{80}	26 July 2010	list
(465847) 2010 PJ_{41}	6 August 2010	list
(465848) 2010 PQ_{51}	8 August 2010	list
(465889) 2010 UT_{2}	23 July 2010	list
(465999) 2011 FY_{55}	14 April 2010	list
(466004) 2011 GZ_{1}	3 March 2010	list
(466032) 2011 HE_{101}	10 May 2010	list
(466036) 2011 JQ_{14}	25 April 2010	list
(466038) 2011 JV_{31}	27 April 2010	list
(466043) 2011 KK_{30}	16 April 2010	list
(466047) 2011 LE_{15}	20 May 2010	list
(466050) 2011 OQ_{19}	18 June 2010	list
(466095) 2012 BZ_{142}	15 January 2010	list
(466146) 2012 HU_{38}	2 March 2010	list
(466205) 2012 PH_{18}	15 May 2010	list
(466228) 2012 TD_{211}	17 June 2010	list
(466233) 2012 UM_{84}	24 June 2010	list
(466256) 2013 JY_{16}	7 July 2010	list
(466344) 2013 RT_{40}	7 February 2010	list
(466350) 2013 RS_{54}	26 March 2010	list

(466364) 2013 RU_{74}	3 March 2010	list
(466427) 2013 TZ_{33}	8 January 2010	list
(466455) 2013 TF_{104}	15 May 2010	list
(466464) 2013 TK_{124}	8 January 2010	list
(466501) 2013 WF_{105}	16 May 2010	list
(466548) 2014 SJ_{299}	2 May 2010	list
(466549) 2014 SK_{301}	2 March 2010	list
(466572) 2014 UX_{19}	13 March 2010	list
(466617) 2014 VD_{17}	6 March 2010	list
(466623) 2014 VJ_{28}	19 April 2010	list
(466719) 2014 WB_{494}	12 January 2010	list
(466732) 2014 YM_{25}	17 May 2010	list
(466735) 2014 YL_{41}	16 June 2010	list
(466770) 2015 AS_{203}	6 May 2010	list
(466806) 2015 BF_{88}	11 June 2010	list
(466809) 2015 BA_{96}	1 May 2010	list
(466840) 2015 BR_{244}	6 June 2010	list
(466869) 2015 BB_{484}	14 February 2010	list
(466874) 2015 CG_{33}	10 June 2010	list
(466898) 2015 DF_{169}	24 May 2010	list
(466906) 2015 EB_{19}	24 January 2010	list
(466955) 2016 AF_{129}	28 January 2010	list
(466957) 2016 AX_{172}	15 January 2010	list
(467060) 2016 DA_{13}	16 April 2010	list
(467103) 2016 EK_{57}	1 June 2010	list

(467150) 2016 EV_{83}	7 April 2010	list
(467158) 2016 EB_{89}	29 April 2010	list
(467216) 2016 EY_{154}	7 May 2010	list
(467218) 2016 EQ_{159}	17 April 2010	list
(467226) 2016 ED_{164}	27 April 2010	list
(467294) 2016 EW_{196}	15 April 2010	list
(467803) 2010 BB_{48}	20 January 2010	list
(467804) 2010 BL_{77}	24 January 2010	list
(467805) 2010 BS_{127}	31 January 2010	list
(467821) 2010 JP_{102}	11 May 2010	list
(467824) 2010 LW_{98}	13 June 2010	list
(467827) 2010 OZ_{101}	28 July 2010	list
(467828) 2010 OG_{107}	29 July 2010	list
(467843) 2010 UR_{15}	20 July 2010	list
(467859) 2010 XL_{33}	20 January 2010	list
(467898) 2011 HH_{40}	3 April 2010	list
(467899) 2011 HP_{41}	18 May 2010	list
(467907) 2011 KM_{3}	17 May 2010	list
(467908) 2011 KD_{7}	26 May 2010	list
(467909) 2011 KR_{23}	3 May 2010	list
(467912) 2011 KM_{47}	17 May 2010	list
(467975) 2012 LW_{10}	6 February 2010	list
(467994) 2012 TF_{164}	24 January 2010	list
(468006) 2012 XL_{128}	25 June 2010	list
(468026) 2013 NR_{7}	18 July 2010	list

(468095) 2013 UW_{13}	13 July 2010	list
(468115) 2013 YN_{54}	1 February 2010	list
(468117) 2014 ED	1 March 2014	list
(468140) 2014 UA_{139}	12 March 2010	list
(468162) 2014 WA_{355}	9 April 2010	list
(468175) 2014 YY_{2}	16 June 2010	list
(468193) 2015 AM_{248}	9 April 2010	list
(468196) 2015 AC_{262}	10 February 2010	list
(468203) 2015 BK_{39}	31 May 2010	list
(468211) 2015 BX_{63}	14 June 2010	list
(468237) 2015 BM_{228}	15 January 2010	list
(468249) 2015 BT_{271}	5 June 2010	list
(468253) 2015 BQ_{291}	27 June 2010	list
(468261) 2015 BR_{396}	8 May 2010	list
(468271) 2015 CJ_{9}	16 June 2010	list
(468275) 2015 CE_{28}	23 June 2010	list
(468327) 2016 CT_{189}	26 March 2010	list
(468397) 2016 GR_{124}	1 June 2010	list
(468403) 2016 GX_{132}	3 April 2010	list
(468705) 2010 BZ_{12}	16 January 2010	list
(468706) 2010 BP_{35}	18 January 2010	list
(468707) 2010 BP_{78}	25 January 2010	list
(468708) 2010 BA_{95}	27 January 2010	list
(468710) 2010 CX_{15}	10 February 2010	list
(468712) 2010 CM_{202}	3 February 2010	list

(468715) 2010 DQ_{55}	21 February 2010	list
(468723) 2010 GG_{45}	5 April 2010	list
(468726) 2010 JO_{38}	13 January 2010	list
(468727) 2010 JE_{87}	10 May 2010	list
(468728) 2010 KA_{127}	1 June 2010	list
(468782) 2012 AV_{21}	19 January 2010	list
(468807) 2012 KA_{19}	31 January 2010	list
(468834) 2012 TH_{322}	24 April 2010	list
(468855) 2013 AK_{133}	19 January 2010	list
(468875) 2013 RS_{31}	3 May 2010	list
(468900) 2013 YD_{113}	14 July 2010	list
(468902) 2014 AH_{6}	9 February 2010	list
(468905) 2014 AH_{42}	12 April 2010	list
(468926) 2014 WQ_{428}	19 March 2010	list
(468928) 2014 WA_{481}	15 June 2010	list
(468933) 2015 AO_{2}	21 June 2010	list
(468935) 2015 AR_{3}	19 May 2010	list
(468941) 2015 AD_{13}	8 May 2010	list
(468943) 2015 AR_{15}	14 June 2010	list
(468945) 2015 AK_{16}	12 January 2010	list
(468951) 2015 AJ_{26}	22 June 2010	list
(468966) 2015 AO_{47}	24 May 2010	list
(468971) 2015 AK_{77}	24 May 2010	list
(468983) 2015 AR_{133}	8 May 2010	list
(469027) 2015 AZ_{244}	16 January 2010	list

(469052) 2015 AV_{264}	31 May 2010	list
(469059) 2015 AH_{279}	5 February 2010	list
(469064) 2015 BB_{6}	16 May 2010	list
(469077) 2015 BV_{132}	12 January 2010	list
(469085) 2015 BN_{309}	26 January 2010	list
(469089) 2015 BZ_{419}	11 June 2010	list
(469142) 2015 FB_{128}	13 January 2010	list
(469151) 2015 GN_{3}	13 February 2010	list
(469186) 2016 FC_{39}	10 June 2010	list
(469195) 2016 GW_{150}	16 June 2010	list
(469200) 2016 GH_{190}	3 June 2010	list
(469226) 2016 HU_{9}	14 April 2010	list
(469228) 2016 HD_{15}	13 April 2010	list
(469258) 2016 JQ_{29}	2 June 2010	list
(471099) 2010 AT_{99}	12 January 2010	list
(471100) 2010 AV_{99}	12 January 2010	list
(471101) 2010 AE_{106}	12 January 2010	list
(471103) 2010 BR_{14}	16 January 2010	list
(471104) 2010 BT_{40}	19 January 2010	list
(471106) 2010 BY_{70}	23 January 2010	list
(471107) 2010 BX_{93}	27 January 2010	list
(471123) 2010 CO_{213}	2 February 2010	list
(471128) 2010 DN_{13}	15 February 2010	list
(471131) 2010 DZ_{50}	21 February 2010	list
(471133) 2010 EC_{9}	4 March 2010	list

(471135) 2010 ER_{25}	10 March 2010	list
(471156) 2010 GZ_{73}	14 April 2010	list
(471159) 2010 GK_{153}	15 April 2010	list
(471161) 2010 HM_{13}	17 April 2010	list
(471163) 2010 HD_{57}	25 April 2010	list
(471164) 2010 HZ_{57}	25 April 2010	list
(471168) 2010 JU_{3}	1 May 2010	list
(471169) 2010 JZ_{22}	4 May 2010	list
(471173) 2010 JR_{84}	24 January 2010	list
(471175) 2010 JY_{131}	13 May 2010	list
(471179) 2010 KW_{20}	17 May 2010	list
(471180) 2010 KF_{23}	18 May 2010	list
(471181) 2010 KM_{35}	19 May 2010	list
(471183) 2010 LE_{61}	24 February 2010	list
(471188) 2010 NT_{13}	2 July 2010	list
(471189) 2010 NZ_{13}	2 July 2010	list
(471190) 2010 NQ_{56}	10 July 2010	list
(471191) 2010 NJ_{83}	1 July 2010	list
(471193) 2010 OC_{74}	1 February 2010	list
(471194) 2010 OM_{107}	3 February 2010	list
(471321) 2011 KG_{6}	1 April 2010	list
(471326) 2011 KJ_{21}	1 May 2010	list
(471346) 2011 QP_{44}	24 June 2010	list
(471364) 2011 ST_{41}	17 February 2010	list
(471374) 2011 SN_{84}	12 April 2010	list

(471377) 2011 SF_{99}	8 April 2010	list
(471380) 2011 SG_{109}	9 February 2010	list
(471411) 2011 SN_{259}	17 April 2010	list
(471412) 2011 SR_{273}	3 August 2010	list
(471433) 2011 UW_{83}	25 May 2010	list
(471438) 2011 UB_{108}	31 March 2010	list
(471444) 2011 UH_{118}	26 March 2010	list
(471452) 2011 UJ_{163}	13 May 2010	list
(471460) 2011 UH_{207}	19 April 2010	list
(471470) 2011 UJ_{329}	7 May 2010	list
(471483) 2011 UB_{398}	20 April 2010	list
(471492) 2011 WW_{41}	16 May 2010	list
(471498) 2011 WB_{138}	25 April 2010	list
(471503) 2011 YJ_{71}	28 January 2010	list
(471563) 2012 PO_{39}	8 June 2010	list
(471568) 2012 QW_{25}	23 January 2010	list
(471740) 2012 UF_{44}	1 May 2010	list
(471782) 2012 VD_{10}	30 July 2010	list
(471788) 2012 VB_{28}	13 June 2010	list
(471859) 2013 AY_{8}	1 May 2010	list
(471892) 2013 AY_{162}	14 April 2010	list
(471990) 2013 VQ_{10}	13 March 2010	list
(472020) 2013 XF_{18}	31 March 2010	list
(472029) 2013 YT_{12}	2 July 2010	list
(472040) 2013 YS_{37}	7 June 2010	list

(472057) 2013 YE_{61}	6 June 2010	list
(472075) 2013 YS_{93}	26 March 2010	list
(472102) 2014 AU_{29}	15 April 2010	list
(472122) 2014 BH_{23}	21 March 2010	list
(472129) 2014 BM_{34}	23 May 2010	list
(472145) 2014 CG_{6}	16 May 2010	list
(472163) 2014 DP_{24}	26 April 2010	list
(472181) 2014 DC_{103}	21 May 2010	list
(472194) 2014 DC_{131}	14 March 2010	list
(472208) 2014 EY_{21}	16 May 2010	list
(472228) 2014 FL_{64}	18 June 2010	list
(472282) 2014 VW_{10}	5 May 2010	list
(472292) 2014 WK_{205}	30 April 2010	list
(472305) 2014 WH_{495}	18 January 2010	list
(472350) 2015 BR_{6}	23 July 2010	list
(472359) 2015 BF_{30}	30 January 2010	list
(472387) 2015 BH_{104}	6 February 2010	list
(472390) 2015 BS_{130}	30 January 2010	list
(472394) 2015 BU_{143}	16 May 2010	list
(472498) 2015 CH_{20}	20 January 2010	list
(472570) 2015 DN_{84}	20 June 2010	list
(472585) 2015 DU_{120}	18 May 2010	list
(472586) 2015 DH_{121}	2 May 2010	list
(472588) 2015 DL_{122}	20 January 2010	list
(472611) 2015 DA_{162}	16 March 2010	list

(472619) 2015 DZ_{175}	13 April 2010	list
(472620) 2015 DC_{176}	1 February 2010	list
(472621) 2015 DH_{178}	31 January 2010	list
(472660) 2015 DM_{221}	26 July 2010	list
(472668) 2015 ER_{8}	22 June 2010	list
(472741) 2015 FR_{94}	28 February 2010	list
(472823) 2015 FS_{173}	24 July 2010	list
(472852) 2015 FB_{288}	9 April 2010	list
(472867) 2015 FB_{297}	23 April 2010	list
(472876) 2015 FY_{304}	28 April 2010	list
(472938) 2015 GG_{25}	24 January 2010	list
(472941) 2015 GA_{26}	7 April 2010	list
(472956) 2015 GJ_{33}	16 February 2010	list
(473057) 2015 HU_{88}	13 March 2010	list
(473069) 2015 HP_{94}	14 April 2010	list
(473114) 2015 HL_{174}	24 February 2010	list
(473125) 2015 JH_{3}	31 January 2010	list
(473134) 2015 JJ_{10}	28 April 2010	list
(473136) 2015 KD_{3}	21 April 2010	list
(473145) 2015 KQ_{8}	11 March 2010	list
(473177) 2015 KT_{59}	17 April 2010	list
(473199) 2015 KF_{90}	27 April 2010	list
(473204) 2015 KF_{103}	18 January 2010	list
(473209) 2015 KJ_{116}	3 April 2010	list
(473246) 2015 LN_{37}	23 May 2010	list

(473255) 2015 MT_{21}	29 March 2010	list
(473272) 2015 MR_{91}	3 April 2010	list
(473277) 2015 NT_{10}	27 January 2010	list
(473428) 2015 VR_{141}	21 July 2010	list
(473443) 2015 XR_{2}	10 May 2010	list
(473447) 2015 XK_{4}	14 January 2010	list
(473481) 2015 XF_{82}	29 January 2010	list
(473548) 2015 XP_{196}	9 July 2010	list
(473566) 2015 XA_{217}	27 January 2010	list
(473602) 2015 XW_{260}	5 June 2010	list
(473629) 2015 XC_{308}	1 February 2010	list
(473638) 2015 XR_{314}	5 August 2010	list
(473667) 2015 XE_{348}	26 January 2010	list
(473685) 2015 XZ_{379}	15 February 2010	list
(473701) 2015 YT_{6}	16 February 2010	list
(473704) 2015 YQ_{8}	26 March 2010	list
(473710) 2015 YD_{16}	10 March 2010	list
(473711) 2015 YR_{16}	9 July 2010	list
(473718) 2015 YU_{20}	26 April 2010	list
(473750) 2016 EJ_{15}	30 April 2010	list
(473771) 2016 EU_{68}	8 May 2010	list
(473791) 2016 EZ_{87}	22 June 2010	list
(473807) 2016 EU_{108}	15 February 2010	list
(473826) 2016 ER_{116}	22 March 2010	list
(473838) 2016 EM_{125}	17 April 2010	list

(473862) 2016 EX_{133}	18 May 2010	list
(473875) 2016 EP_{138}	28 March 2010	list
(473975) 2016 EX_{195}	24 May 2010	list
(473990) 2016 EM_{202}	3 June 2010	list
(474016) 2016 GB_{8}	8 April 2010	list
(474030) 2016 GD_{151}	24 July 2010	list
(474094) 2016 LB_{4}	6 February 2010	list
(474098) 2016 LE_{7}	4 July 2010	list
(474104) 2016 LB_{18}	2 August 2010	list
(474105) 2016 LP_{19}	22 July 2010	list
(474108) 2016 LS_{25}	6 February 2010	list
(474110) 2016 LL_{28}	26 January 2010	list
(474115) 2016 LW_{41}	16 January 2010	list
(477482) 2010 AN_{131}	15 January 2010	list
(477483) 2010 AO_{132}	14 January 2010	list
(477489) 2010 CU_{11}	9 February 2010	list
(477490) 2010 CG_{18}	19 January 2010	list
(477508) 2010 CK_{140}	15 February 2010	list
(477516) 2010 CX_{216}	7 February 2010	list
(477519) 2010 DJ_{56}	23 February 2010	list
(477520) 2010 DV_{64}	26 February 2010	list
(477524) 2010 EH_{43}	23 January 2010	list
(477525) 2010 EF_{69}	19 January 2010	list
(477529) 2010 EH_{86}	15 January 2010	list
(477568) 2010 GV_{133}	8 January 2010	list

(477570) 2010 GK_{160}	15 January 2010	list
(477571) 2010 HC_{44}	23 April 2010	list
(477572) 2010 HH_{74}	28 April 2010	list
(477580) 2010 JO_{17}	3 May 2010	list
(477581) 2010 JP_{20}	3 May 2010	list
(477587) 2010 JT_{86}	11 May 2010	list
(477588) 2010 JD_{87}	7 May 2010	list
(477589) 2010 JA_{89}	9 May 2010	list
(477590) 2010 JN_{98}	11 May 2010	list
(477591) 2010 JA_{102}	11 May 2010	list
(477593) 2010 JR_{131}	13 May 2010	list
(477594) 2010 JW_{142}	15 May 2010	list
(477595) 2010 JX_{142}	15 May 2010	list
(477600) 2010 KU_{13}	17 May 2010	list
(477601) 2010 KH_{17}	17 May 2010	list
(477603) 2010 KG_{46}	21 May 2010	list
(477604) 2010 KX_{52}	23 May 2010	list
(477605) 2010 KF_{56}	23 May 2010	list
(477606) 2010 KN_{84}	26 May 2010	list
(477608) 2010 KS_{103}	29 May 2010	list
(477609) 2010 KC_{109}	29 May 2010	list
(477611) 2010 KL_{115}	30 May 2010	list
(477612) 2010 KZ_{119}	31 May 2010	list
(477613) 2010 KE_{121}	31 May 2010	list
(477614) 2010 KW_{121}	31 May 2010	list

(477615) 2010 KT_{122}	31 May 2010	list
(477616) 2010 LR_{2}	1 June 2010	list
(477617) 2010 LT_{5}	1 June 2010	list
(477618) 2010 LF_{13}	2 June 2010	list
(477619) 2010 LU_{32}	6 June 2010	list
(477621) 2010 LD_{37}	6 June 2010	list
(477622) 2010 LT_{51}	8 June 2010	list
(477623) 2010 LU_{55}	9 June 2010	list
(477624) 2010 LZ_{56}	9 June 2010	list
(477625) 2010 LR_{58}	9 June 2010	list
(477627) 2010 LY_{69}	9 June 2010	list
(477628) 2010 LN_{78}	10 June 2010	list
(477629) 2010 LZ_{87}	12 June 2010	list
(477630) 2010 LZ_{96}	13 June 2010	list
(477631) 2010 LG_{97}	13 June 2010	list
(477632) 2010 LT_{112}	25 April 2010	list
(477633) 2010 LD_{118}	14 June 2010	list
(477636) 2010 MQ_{6}	16 June 2010	list
(477637) 2010 MK_{20}	18 June 2010	list
(477639) 2010 MC_{37}	21 June 2010	list
(477640) 2010 MD_{41}	22 June 2010	list
(477641) 2010 MN_{61}	24 June 2010	list
(477642) 2010 ME_{68}	25 June 2010	list
(477643) 2010 MO_{74}	26 June 2010	list
(477644) 2010 MP_{77}	26 June 2010	list

(477645) 2010 MJ_{84}	27 June 2010	list
(477646) 2010 ME_{87}	27 June 2010	list
(477648) 2010 MX_{89}	28 June 2010	list
(477649) 2010 ML_{102}	29 June 2010	list
(477650) 2010 MR_{105}	30 June 2010	list
(477651) 2010 NZ_{31}	7 July 2010	list
(477652) 2010 NT_{44}	21 January 2010	list
(477653) 2010 NH_{45}	9 July 2010	list
(477654) 2010 NG_{49}	9 July 2010	list
(477655) 2010 NF_{61}	11 July 2010	list
(477656) 2010 ND_{62}	11 July 2010	list
(477657) 2010 NJ_{67}	14 July 2010	list
(477658) 2010 NA_{69}	14 July 2010	list
(477659) 2010 NN_{82}	1 July 2010	list
(477661) 2010 NB_{98}	12 July 2010	list
(477662) 2010 NU_{101}	12 July 2010	list
(477664) 2010 OE_{2}	16 July 2010	list
(477665) 2010 OZ_{11}	17 July 2010	list
(477666) 2010 OG_{14}	17 July 2010	list
(477667) 2010 OG_{15}	17 July 2010	list
(477668) 2010 OY_{43}	21 July 2010	list
(477671) 2010 OH_{85}	26 July 2010	list
(477673) 2010 OT_{109}	29 July 2010	list
(477674) 2010 OS_{115}	30 January 2010	list
(477675) 2010 OY_{125}	2 February 2010	list

(477676) 2010 PE_{47}	7 August 2010	list
(477691) 2010 RV_{92}	12 June 2010	list
(477705) 2010 RY_{143}	8 July 2010	list
(477723) 2010 SK_{21}	11 July 2010	list
(477750) 2010 VE_{44}	28 July 2010	list
(477872) 2011 HC_{42}	1 April 2010	list
(477900) 2011 KX_{11}	4 April 2010	list
(477903) 2011 KF_{27}	26 February 2010	list
(477928) 2011 QS_{48}	12 July 2010	list
(478006) 2011 SC_{160}	6 August 2010	list
(478065) 2011 UT_{5}	20 May 2010	list
(478080) 2011 UG_{29}	11 April 2010	list
(478114) 2011 UW_{84}	21 May 2010	list
(478115) 2011 UK_{85}	31 May 2010	list
(478121) 2011 UB_{103}	6 June 2010	list
(478162) 2011 UN_{175}	10 April 2010	list
(478165) 2011 UG_{176}	27 March 2010	list
(478172) 2011 UM_{183}	9 June 2010	list
(478182) 2011 UJ_{208}	14 April 2010	list
(478187) 2011 UG_{235}	19 March 2010	list
(478188) 2011 UW_{241}	28 May 2010	list
(478192) 2011 UB_{244}	21 May 2010	list
(478199) 2011 UQ_{252}	24 May 2010	list
(478219) 2011 UY_{311}	26 April 2010	list
(478220) 2011 UL_{312}	16 February 2010	list

(478226) 2011 UY_{317}	24 May 2010	list
(478239) 2011 UH_{340}	15 April 2010	list
(478260) 2011 UA_{395}	4 May 2010	list
(478288) 2011 WH_{11}	31 May 2010	list
(478289) 2011 WU_{13}	20 May 2010	list
(478294) 2011 WQ_{19}	19 April 2010	list
(478297) 2011 WS_{23}	16 April 2010	list
(478302) 2011 WP_{49}	14 May 2010	list
(478309) 2011 WS_{69}	15 April 2010	list
(478323) 2011 WZ_{92}	31 May 2010	list
(478341) 2011 WR_{130}	2 June 2010	list
(478344) 2011 WE_{136}	28 May 2010	list
(478348) 2011 WZ_{136}	9 May 2010	list
(478350) 2011 WZ_{140}	9 June 2010	list
(478384) 2012 BE_{2}	16 July 2010	list
(478391) 2012 BN_{32}	8 August 2010	list
(478393) 2012 BK_{65}	6 August 2010	list
(478395) 2012 BW_{67}	6 July 2010	list
(478396) 2012 BU_{72}	15 July 2010	list
(478400) 2012 BJ_{103}	26 July 2010	list
(478402) 2012 BE_{128}	22 July 2010	list
(478403) 2012 BW_{131}	15 July 2010	list
(478542) 2012 TY_{18}	6 April 2010	list
(478575) 2012 TQ_{79}	7 May 2010	list
(478771) 2012 UF_{125}	16 January 2010	list

(478782) 2012 US_{133}	4 May 2010	list
(478953) 2012 XO_{54}	25 June 2010	list
(479002) 2012 XF_{140}	26 February 2010	list
(479009) 2012 XG_{147}	14 April 2010	list
(479011) 2012 XG_{149}	18 February 2010	list
(479024) 2013 AL_{12}	18 May 2010	list
(479026) 2013 AP_{13}	20 June 2010	list
(479037) 2013 AY_{32}	16 May 2010	list
(479081) 2013 AE_{99}	10 April 2010	list
(479124) 2013 BW_{23}	24 May 2010	list
(479126) 2013 BD_{26}	16 June 2010	list
(479159) 2013 CL_{14}	7 June 2010	list
(479165) 2013 CY_{24}	20 May 2010	list
(479182) 2013 CL_{56}	3 May 2010	list
(479183) 2013 CY_{56}	18 June 2010	list
(479209) 2013 CV_{127}	11 July 2010	list
(479238) 2013 DN_{7}	3 May 2010	list
(479239) 2013 DC_{8}	29 April 2010	list
(479240) 2013 DU_{8}	18 July 2010	list
(479245) 2013 EE_{3}	17 June 2010	list
(479249) 2013 EB_{37}	9 June 2010	list
(479256) 2013 EF_{90}	20 May 2010	list
(479389) 2013 YN_{11}	31 January 2010	list
(479390) 2013 YR_{13}	27 January 2010	list
(479415) 2013 YR_{72}	11 April 2010	list

(479451) 2013 YJ_{121}	13 March 2010	list
(479469) 2014 AC_{1}	16 May 2010	list
(479479) 2014 AE_{14}	11 May 2010	list
(479486) 2014 AD_{28}	16 June 2010	list
(479563) 2014 CU_{5}	17 May 2010	list
(479571) 2014 CV_{9}	2 May 2010	list
(479590) 2014 CN_{22}	1 June 2010	list
(479594) 2014 DS_{4}	21 March 2010	list
(479603) 2014 DW_{10}	16 February 2010	list
(479642) 2014 DC_{48}	15 May 2010	list
(479710) 2014 DO_{120}	17 February 2010	list
(479743) 2014 EK_{8}	12 March 2010	list
(479778) 2014 EY_{34}	26 May 2010	list
(479784) 2014 EP_{44}	23 February 2010	list
(479791) 2014 ES_{50}	7 February 2010	list
(479808) 2014 FL_{31}	24 January 2010	list
(479810) 2014 FK_{35}	4 May 2010	list
(479830) 2014 FY_{64}	28 June 2010	list
(479881) 2014 HO_{6}	21 June 2010	list
(479898) 2014 HC_{33}	28 June 2010	list
(479916) 2014 HD_{52}	18 June 2010	list
(479947) 2014 HV_{167}	10 June 2010	list
(479956) 2014 HP_{185}	21 May 2010	list
(479962) 2014 JS_{10}	10 June 2010	list
(479979) 2014 JB_{53}	25 June 2010	list

(480010) 2014 MX_{28}	22 May 2010	list
(480036) 2015 BT_{156}	27 January 2010	list
(480052) 2015 CV_{39}	30 April 2010	list
(480103) 2015 FK_{42}	22 April 2010	list
(480108) 2015 FS_{45}	18 April 2010	list
(480109) 2015 FT_{69}	9 June 2010	list
(480164) 2015 FK_{300}	29 March 2010	list
(480188) 2015 FZ_{333}	13 April 2010	list
(480189) 2015 FP_{336}	24 February 2010	list
(480195) 2015 FZ_{339}	14 August 2010	list
(480199) 2015 FB_{343}	25 March 2010	list
(480297) 2015 HB_{155}	3 May 2010	list
(480327) 2015 HD_{180}	15 March 2010	list
(480351) 2015 KJ_{14}	22 April 2010	list
(480362) 2015 KR_{24}	12 April 2010	list
(480383) 2015 KC_{45}	12 April 2010	list
(480387) 2015 KS_{48}	4 June 2010	list
(480399) 2015 KA_{60}	15 May 2010	list
(480406) 2015 KZ_{80}	26 July 2010	list
(480407) 2015 KL_{81}	14 May 2010	list
(480425) 2015 KL_{117}	14 January 2010	list
(480442) 2015 KE_{138}	1 February 2010	list
(480451) 2015 KR_{158}	3 June 2010	list
(480453) 2015 KT_{159}	27 May 2010	list
(480459) 2015 LP_{2}	21 May 2010	list

(480467) 2015 LE_{8}	15 May 2010	list
(480475) 2015 LQ_{14}	26 April 2010	list
(480506) 2015 MN	21 May 2010	list
(480514) 2015 ME_{6}	28 June 2010	list
(480521) 2015 MC_{9}	18 June 2010	list
(480527) 2015 ME_{11}	8 July 2010	list
(480528) 2015 MM_{13}	25 June 2010	list
(480544) 2015 MG_{50}	2 July 2010	list
(480545) 2015 MJ_{52}	8 June 2010	list
(480557) 2015 MD_{63}	19 May 2010	list
(480560) 2015 MB_{66}	24 June 2010	list
(480574) 2015 MM_{75}	22 May 2010	list
(480583) 2015 MB_{81}	29 May 2010	list
(480598) 2015 MQ_{91}	21 June 2010	list
(480600) 2015 MG_{93}	1 June 2010	list
(480608) 2015 MG_{104}	20 May 2010	list
(480624) 2015 ML_{128}	13 June 2010	list
(480638) 2015 NQ_{9}	22 May 2010	list
(480647) 2015 NU_{21}	1 April 2010	list
(480658) 2015 OC_{24}	18 July 2010	list
(480666) 2015 OQ_{51}	1 May 2010	list
(480676) 2015 PJ_{5}	27 June 2010	list
(480677) 2015 PZ_{12}	30 June 2010	list
(480703) 2015 PE_{212}	17 March 2010	list
(480708) 2015 PX_{302}	7 August 2010	list

(480765) 2016 NZ_{53}	13 May 2010	list
(480787) 2016 PU_{28}	13 March 2010	list
(480802) 2016 PV_{59}	19 May 2010	list
(482061) 2010 BN_{62}	21 January 2010	list
(482070) 2010 CD_{134}	15 February 2010	list
(482073) 2010 DJ_{23}	18 February 2010	list
(482087) 2010 HP_{21}	22 April 2010	list
(482088) 2010 HW_{22}	25 April 2010	list
(482092) 2010 JF_{118}	9 February 2010	list
(482094) 2010 LD_{46}	8 June 2010	list
(482095) 2010 LM_{101}	13 June 2010	list
(482096) 2010 LV_{114}	13 June 2010	list
(482097) 2010 LF_{132}	16 June 2010	list
(482099) 2010 MM_{11}	17 June 2010	list
(482100) 2010 MR_{28}	19 June 2010	list
(482103) 2010 MG_{59}	24 June 2010	list
(482104) 2010 MU_{71}	25 June 2010	list
(482105) 2010 MS_{74}	26 June 2010	list
(482106) 2010 MX_{79}	26 June 2010	list
(482107) 2010 MD_{80}	26 June 2010	list
(482108) 2010 MC_{83}	27 June 2010	list
(482109) 2010 MG_{100}	29 June 2010	list
(482110) 2010 MX_{108}	30 June 2010	list
(482111) 2010 NT_{1}	4 July 2010	list
(482112) 2010 NN_{17}	6 July 2010	list

(482113) 2010 NF_{20}	2 July 2010	list
(482114) 2010 NZ_{32}	8 July 2010	list
(482115) 2010 NM_{52}	10 July 2010	list
(482119) 2010 OW_{21}	18 July 2010	list
(482120) 2010 OG_{24}	18 July 2010	list
(482121) 2010 OZ_{42}	21 July 2010	list
(482122) 2010 OF_{80}	26 July 2010	list
(482124) 2010 OD_{124}	31 July 2010	list
(482127) 2010 PR_{70}	10 August 2010	list
(482130) 2010 RN_{50}	11 July 2010	list
(482139) 2010 RP_{182}	9 July 2010	list
(482144) 2010 SJ_{26}	24 June 2010	list
(482150) 2010 TL_{23}	10 July 2010	list
(482163) 2010 TC_{100}	9 July 2010	list
(482166) 2010 TP_{121}	28 June 2010	list
(482175) 2010 TC_{186}	30 July 2010	list
(482186) 2010 UC_{57}	1 August 2010	list
(482191) 2010 UR_{86}	25 July 2010	list
(482209) 2010 VB_{213}	23 July 2010	list
(482249) 2011 KT_{21}	19 April 2010	list
(482255) 2011 OD_{41}	17 June 2010	list
(482314) 2011 UF_{207}	23 February 2010	list
(482345) 2011 WH_{17}	12 May 2010	list
(482371) 2011 YH_{35}	8 August 2010	list
(482375) 2011 YJ_{60}	18 July 2010	list

(482377) 2011 YF_{69}	11 July 2010	list
(482387) 2012 AD_{14}	1 August 2010	list
(482421) 2012 BP_{133}	1 August 2010	list
(482430) 2012 CV_{32}	30 June 2010	list
(482438) 2012 DK_{5}	29 July 2010	list
(482582) 2012 XA_{46}	22 January 2010	list
(482591) 2012 XL_{105}	27 April 2010	list
(482616) 2013 AM_{26}	22 March 2010	list
(482697) 2013 CB_{134}	28 March 2010	list
(482716) 2013 DR_{10}	11 May 2010	list
(482787) 2013 KB_{17}	16 January 2010	list
(482811) 2013 WR_{57}	10 June 2010	list
(482921) 2014 HR_{159}	3 August 2010	list
(482923) 2014 HL_{164}	7 August 2010	list
(482926) 2014 HA_{187}	10 June 2010	list
(482928) 2014 JW	18 May 2010	list
(482933) 2014 JC_{27}	18 June 2010	list
(482936) 2014 JR_{38}	23 June 2010	list
(482944) 2014 JL_{67}	26 April 2010	list
(482949) 2014 KV_{2}	11 July 2010	list
(482955) 2014 KB_{42}	13 July 2010	list
(482968) 2014 KK_{69}	20 July 2010	list
(482971) 2014 KA_{94}	2 March 2010	list
(482975) 2014 LX_{3}	27 July 2010	list
(483005) 2014 SP_{140}	20 January 2010	list

(483024) 2014 WB_{367}	19 April 2010	list
(483060) 2015 KT_{131}	23 May 2010	list
(483071) 2015 LE_{20}	7 June 2010	list
(483076) 2015 LX_{35}	9 June 2010	list
(483081) 2015 MY_{4}	15 May 2010	list
(483085) 2015 MJ_{49}	23 July 2010	list
(483103) 2015 MV_{97}	19 June 2010	list
(483105) 2015 MY_{108}	28 June 2010	list
(483107) 2015 MS_{109}	3 July 2010	list
(483110) 2015 MN_{118}	18 June 2010	list
(483111) 2015 MC_{121}	11 July 2010	list
(483131) 2015 OC_{15}	30 July 2010	list
(483138) 2015 OA_{25}	23 June 2010	list
(483149) 2015 OH_{69}	26 May 2010	list
(483152) 2015 OC_{74}	20 July 2010	list
(483153) 2015 PF_{2}	22 July 2010	list
(483154) 2015 PJ_{3}	10 August 2010	list
(483155) 2015 PO_{3}	29 July 2010	list
(483159) 2015 PD_{9}	2 August 2010	list
(483161) 2015 PL_{22}	15 July 2010	list
(483164) 2015 PK_{34}	22 June 2010	list
(483171) 2015 PG_{43}	20 July 2010	list
(483173) 2015 PR_{48}	19 July 2010	list
(483174) 2015 PC_{51}	25 July 2010	list
(483179) 2015 PD_{86}	16 June 2010	list

(483180) 2015 PP_{97}	21 June 2010	list
(483188) 2015 PS_{140}	21 July 2010	list
(483191) 2015 PZ_{175}	3 August 2010	list
(483204) 2015 PW_{303}	15 January 2010	list
(483208) 2015 PR_{310}	7 July 2010	list
(483214) 2015 RN_{4}	28 July 2010	list
(483217) 2015 RW_{23}	17 July 2010	list
(483238) 2015 RY_{103}	20 January 2010	list
(483292) 2015 TP_{345}	3 May 2010	list
(483333) 2016 PQ_{78}	1 June 2010	list
(483339) 2016 QD_{75}	24 May 2010	list
(483340) 2016 QK_{75}	31 March 2010	list
(483378) 2016 TJ_{9}	2 July 2010	list
(485046) 2010 AZ_{83}	7 January 2010	list
(485048) 2010 BQ_{5}	12 January 2010	list
(485063) 2010 DB_{52}	21 February 2010	list
(485098) 2010 GF_{42}	7 April 2010	list
(485102) 2010 GT_{110}	19 January 2010	list
(485103) 2010 GX_{114}	21 January 2010	list
(485108) 2010 HL_{17}	18 April 2010	list
(485110) 2010 HZ_{108}	25 April 2010	list
(485111) 2010 HY_{111}	19 April 2010	list
(485112) 2010 JE_{34}	16 January 2010	list
(485119) 2010 KO_{57}	20 May 2010	list
(485120) 2010 KY_{116}	30 May 2010	list

(485121) 2010 KJ_{123}	31 May 2010	list
(485122) 2010 LB_{13}	2 June 2010	list
(485123) 2010 LT_{102}	13 June 2010	list
(485125) 2010 LM_{109}	13 March 2010	list
(485126) 2010 MA_{46}	23 June 2010	list
(485127) 2010 MA_{54}	16 June 2010	list
(485128) 2010 MM_{61}	24 June 2010	list
(485130) 2010 MK_{92}	28 June 2010	list
(485131) 2010 MH_{97}	29 June 2010	list
(485134) 2010 NA_{12}	2 July 2010	list
(485135) 2010 NU_{69}	14 July 2010	list
(485137) 2010 NY_{79}	15 July 2010	list
(485140) 2010 OC_{22}	18 July 2010	list
(485142) 2010 OE_{27}	19 July 2010	list
(485143) 2010 OP_{63}	24 July 2010	list
(485144) 2010 OC_{99}	28 July 2010	list
(485148) 2010 PF_{49}	7 August 2010	list
(485209) 2010 UR_{77}	6 August 2010	list
(485220) 2010 VS	12 May 2010	list
(485225) 2010 VQ_{19}	8 August 2010	list
(485240) 2010 VO_{74}	27 July 2010	list
(485306) 2011 AF_{62}	25 January 2010	list
(485331) 2011 BC_{95}	29 January 2010	list
(485338) 2011 BS_{134}	8 January 2010	list
(485349) 2011 CN_{39}	6 February 2010	list

(485353) 2011 CN_{45}	5 February 2010	list
(485377) 2011 FS_{21}	17 February 2010	list
(485429) 2011 QP_{31}	30 May 2010	list
(485666) 2011 WN_{88}	13 June 2010	list
(485723) 2012 BD_{15}	22 May 2010	list
(485800) 2012 DL_{33}	14 January 2010	list
(485817) 2012 DR_{52}	21 July 2010	list
(485978) 2012 JV_{23}	25 February 2010	list
(485984) 2012 JT_{66}	8 January 2010	list
(486039) 2012 TQ_{124}	7 May 2010	list
(486175) 2013 AU_{8}	10 February 2010	list
(486304) 2013 CG_{84}	1 May 2010	list
(486510) 2013 GO_{114}	12 July 2010	list
(486666) 2013 QD_{87}	14 April 2010	list
(486695) 2013 WP_{63}	11 April 2010	list
(486868) 2014 KQ_{30}	9 March 2010	list
(486873) 2014 KP_{44}	17 April 2010	list
(486875) 2014 KZ_{51}	11 April 2010	list
(486886) 2014 KB_{67}	4 July 2010	list
(486899) 2014 KF_{94}	24 June 2010	list
(486921) 2014 MB_{7}	28 January 2010	list
(486940) 2014 MV_{37}	30 January 2010	list
(486952) 2014 MB_{60}	15 January 2010	list
(486962) 2014 NE_{5}	20 May 2010	list
(486974) 2014 NY_{20}	18 March 2010	list

(487066) 2014 OO_{93}	23 May 2010	list
(487094) 2014 OO_{130}	27 June 2010	list
(487154) 2014 OP_{232}	12 February 2010	list
(487222) 2014 OJ_{390}	20 January 2010	list
(487236) 2014 PC_{11}	13 February 2010	list
(487270) 2014 PJ_{57}	6 February 2010	list
(487284) 2014 QV_{23}	15 January 2010	list
(487359) 2014 QT_{237}	29 January 2010	list
(487467) 2014 SR_{146}	28 February 2010	list
(487472) 2014 SE_{154}	25 July 2010	list
(487512) 2014 TF_{44}	18 February 2010	list
(487521) 2014 UQ_{54}	16 March 2010	list
(487547) 2014 VO_{3}	7 February 2010	list
(487579) 2015 AK_{46}	13 March 2010	list
(487618) 2015 MT_{82}	20 June 2010	list
(487644) 2015 OV_{40}	27 July 2010	list
(487671) 2015 PP_{113}	17 July 2010	list
(487693) 2015 PD_{308}	12 August 2010	list
(487720) 2015 RS_{63}	28 July 2010	list
(487777) 2015 RR_{220}	29 April 2010	list
(487827) 2015 TY_{70}	23 May 2010	list
(487918) 2015 TG_{197}	6 August 2010	list
(488092) 2015 VC_{42}	30 May 2010	list
(488109) 2015 VQ_{78}	17 June 2010	list
(488134) 2015 VA_{124}	9 January 2010	list

(488156) 2015 WY_{13}	12 June 2010	list
(488194) 2015 XT_{198}	22 January 2010	list
(488223) 2016 AT_{5}	27 April 2010	list
(488244) 2016 BY_{15}	5 March 2010	list
(488315) 2016 UX_{79}	25 June 2010	list
(488401) 2016 WN_{53}	17 June 2010	list
(488429) 2016 XJ_{21}	10 June 2010	list
(488446) 2016 YR_{9}	20 June 2010	list
(490626) 2010 AY_{91}	8 January 2010	list
(490630) 2010 BF_{122}	30 January 2010	list
(490650) 2010 FX_{31}	16 March 2010	list
(490660) 2010 GW_{117}	27 January 2010	list
(490662) 2010 HG_{43}	22 April 2010	list
(490663) 2010 HH_{61}	26 April 2010	list
(490673) 2010 JW_{96}	11 May 2010	list
(490674) 2010 JB_{113}	25 January 2010	list
(490675) 2010 JW_{148}	28 January 2010	list
(490679) 2010 KO_{53}	23 May 2010	list
(490680) 2010 KR_{84}	26 May 2010	list
(490681) 2010 LJ_{8}	2 June 2010	list
(490682) 2010 LT_{28}	6 June 2010	list
(490685) 2010 LB_{37}	6 June 2010	list
(490686) 2010 LY_{44}	7 June 2010	list
(490688) 2010 MH_{17}	17 June 2010	list
(490689) 2010 MG_{35}	21 June 2010	list

(490690) 2010 MW_{65}	25 June 2010	list
(490694) 2010 NU_{30}	7 July 2010	list
(490695) 2010 OC_{24}	19 July 2010	list
(490696) 2010 OE_{70}	25 July 2010	list
(490697) 2010 OA_{71}	25 July 2010	list
(490699) 2010 OW_{103}	28 January 2010	list
(490700) 2010 OM_{125}	31 July 2010	list
(490702) 2010 PQ_{35}	5 August 2010	list
(490703) 2010 PF_{41}	6 August 2010	list
(490707) 2010 QZ_{1}	21 August 2010	list
(490738) 2010 SS_{4}	27 June 2010	list
(490845) 2010 XS	18 February 2010	list
(490856) 2011 AQ	16 January 2010	list
(490879) 2011 BA_{21}	18 January 2010	list
(490882) 2011 BN_{33}	17 January 2010	list
(490894) 2011 BX_{70}	9 January 2010	list
(490898) 2011 BU_{90}	24 February 2010	list
(490922) 2011 CW_{47}	12 February 2010	list
(490945) 2011 CQ_{95}	2 February 2010	list
(490948) 2011 CO_{98}	2 March 2010	list
(490970) 2011 EA_{9}	26 January 2010	list
(490984) 2011 FE_{22}	25 February 2010	list
(490986) 2011 FN_{27}	9 April 2010	list
(490990) 2011 FU_{103}	27 February 2010	list
(491157) 2011 SE_{216}	8 May 2010	list

(491250) 2011 UJ_{241}	24 April 2010	list
(491301) 2011 WT_{20}	26 April 2010	list
(491306) 2011 WK_{38}	24 May 2010	list
(491726) 2012 UK_{165}	27 June 2010	list
(491739) 2012 VQ_{29}	31 May 2010	list
(491874) 2013 BD_{13}	2 July 2010	list
(491982) 2013 ER_{32}	22 February 2010	list
(492060) 2013 HH_{52}	11 June 2010	list
(492286) 2013 YZ_{21}	31 May 2010	list
(492340) 2014 FL_{43}	8 April 2010	list
(492424) 2014 LJ_{15}	19 May 2010	list
(492443) 2014 MW_{43}	26 May 2010	list
(492468) 2014 ND_{30}	5 June 2010	list
(492469) 2014 NH_{30}	15 July 2010	list
(492475) 2014 NZ_{36}	12 June 2010	list
(492477) 2014 NK_{37}	8 February 2010	list
(492486) 2014 NE_{54}	27 May 2010	list
(492534) 2014 OL_{90}	7 July 2010	list
(492562) 2014 OM_{146}	8 June 2010	list
(492646) 2014 OH_{358}	5 March 2010	list
(492692) 2014 PN_{54}	8 August 2010	list
(492694) 2014 PN_{57}	13 February 2010	list
(492710) 2014 QX_{25}	17 January 2010	list
(492740) 2014 QV_{128}	28 January 2010	list
(492756) 2014 QE_{168}	3 March 2010	list

(492777) 2014 QC_{214}	1 July 2010	list
(492830) 2014 QJ_{301}	17 February 2010	list
(492848) 2014 QA_{337}	15 February 2010	list
(492856) 2014 QY_{353}	1 March 2010	list
(492873) 2014 QM_{384}	1 February 2010	list
(492968) 2014 SL_{135}	29 March 2010	list
(492994) 2014 SD_{186}	21 July 2010	list
(493005) 2014 SC_{208}	12 March 2010	list
(493068) 2014 SE_{293}	17 April 2010	list
(493078) 2014 SB_{308}	12 April 2010	list
(493086) 2014 SQ_{317}	2 February 2010	list
(493116) 2014 TK_{16}	3 April 2010	list
(493124) 2014 TG_{32}	12 April 2010	list
(493145) 2014 TH_{52}	7 May 2010	list
(493156) 2014 TX_{70}	1 March 2010	list
(493169) 2014 TN_{84}	19 February 2010	list
(493180) 2014 UJ_{12}	18 January 2010	list
(493190) 2014 UQ_{19}	1 April 2010	list
(493213) 2014 UK_{48}	19 February 2010	list
(493223) 2014 UL_{62}	1 March 2010	list
(493239) 2014 UH_{90}	29 April 2010	list
(493263) 2014 UG_{125}	15 February 2010	list
(493300) 2014 UZ_{182}	12 May 2010	list
(493301) 2014 UM_{183}	1 March 2010	list
(493305) 2014 UF_{184}	1 March 2010	list

(493306) 2014 UM_{184}	31 January 2010	list
(493333) 2014 VL_{11}	18 April 2010	list
(493334) 2014 VP_{11}	20 April 2010	list
(493340) 2014 VH_{22}	8 March 2010	list
(493341) 2014 VD_{29}	1 April 2010	list
(493353) 2014 WH_{19}	6 March 2010	list
(493380) 2014 WX_{117}	21 February 2010	list
(493413) 2014 WA_{215}	15 February 2010	list
(493431) 2014 WF_{321}	27 January 2010	list
(493432) 2014 WA_{322}	12 March 2010	list
(493437) 2014 WO_{336}	29 April 2010	list
(493441) 2014 WM_{341}	5 February 2010	list
(493447) 2014 WK_{366}	24 March 2010	list
(493470) 2014 WO_{499}	27 March 2010	list
(493473) 2014 XC_{4}	12 January 2010	list
(493477) 2014 YN_{20}	13 March 2010	list
(493541) 2015 GE_{36}	21 January 2010	list
(493601) 2015 MO_{91}	19 July 2010	list
(493604) 2015 MD_{104}	19 June 2010	list
(493609) 2015 NH_{8}	28 June 2010	list
(493616) 2015 OC_{19}	9 June 2010	list
(493706) 2015 TB_{87}	16 April 2010	list
(493716) 2015 TL_{121}	1 June 2010	list
(493738) 2015 TJ_{200}	8 February 2010	list
(493751) 2015 TR_{256}	13 January 2010	list

(493763) 2015 TH_{321}	28 July 2010	list
(493790) 2015 UL_{66}	21 January 2010	list
(493829) 2015 VB_{124}	27 April 2010	list
(493943) 2016 AB_{11}	4 March 2010	list
(493954) 2016 AP_{44}	3 February 2010	list
(493961) 2016 AJ_{53}	7 February 2010	list
(493969) 2016 AT_{66}	12 February 2010	list
(493971) 2016 AM_{68}	25 February 2010	list
(493980) 2016 AM_{81}	19 February 2010	list
(494009) 2016 AU_{115}	27 February 2010	list
(494010) 2016 AZ_{118}	8 April 2010	list
(494013) 2016 AR_{122}	9 April 2010	list
(494025) 2016 AQ_{172}	1 April 2010	list
(494040) 2016 BQ_{17}	15 March 2010	list
(494059) 2016 BC_{54}	12 February 2010	list
(494072) 2016 BW_{70}	2 April 2010	list
(494139) 2016 CD_{199}	13 March 2010	list
(494150) 2016 CJ_{251}	2 April 2010	list
(494153) 2016 CU_{259}	27 May 2010	list
(494160) 2016 ED_{76}	17 April 2010	list
(494183) 2016 GA_{247}	18 May 2010	list
(494194) 2016 HK_{1}	13 May 2010	list
(494301) 2016 SO_{7}	15 June 2010	list
(494449) 2016 UP_{142}	25 June 2010	list
(494480) 2016 WV_{24}	4 February 2010	list

(494484) 2016 WX_{32}	22 May 2010	list
(494487) 2016 WY_{35}	21 July 2010	list
(494635) 2017 CO_{30}	20 January 2010	list
(494636) 2017 DN_{7}	5 April 2010	list
(494991) 2010 CM_{229}	9 February 2010	list
(494996) 2010 HD_{76}	28 April 2010	list
(495000) 2010 JF_{46}	7 February 2010	list
(495004) 2010 KD_{50}	22 May 2010	list
(495005) 2010 KJ_{125}	31 May 2010	list
(495006) 2010 LV_{1}	1 June 2010	list
(495007) 2010 MX_{63}	24 June 2010	list
(495009) 2010 MW_{85}	27 June 2010	list
(495065) 2011 EC_{77}	26 January 2010	list
(495073) 2011 GP_{78}	2 April 2010	list
(495075) 2011 HW_{12}	21 April 2010	list
(495079) 2011 HE_{57}	27 February 2010	list
(495281) 2013 RU_{50}	18 February 2010	list
(495300) 2013 VO_{22}	13 May 2010	list
(495367) 2014 OO_{191}	30 July 2010	list
(495393) 2014 QB_{255}	1 August 2010	list
(495424) 2014 SP_{168}	31 March 2010	list
(495430) 2014 SD_{215}	18 March 2010	list
(495431) 2014 SM_{215}	12 January 2010	list
(495503) 2014 UY_{172}	30 March 2010	list
(495547) 2014 WF_{159}	1 April 2010	list

(495567) 2014 WK_{397}	4 April 2010	list
(495587) 2015 AQ_{23}	19 March 2010	list
(495588) 2015 AG_{25}	1 April 2010	list
(495658) 2016 AK_{100}	12 February 2010	list
(495674) 2016 AT_{168}	28 February 2010	list
(495697) 2016 CN_{11}	17 March 2010	list
(495709) 2016 CL_{70}	14 March 2010	list
(495712) 2016 CY_{83}	10 March 2010	list
(495713) 2016 CG_{92}	30 April 2010	list
(495727) 2016 CH_{208}	7 April 2010	list
(495730) 2016 CO_{263}	18 March 2010	list
(495735) 2016 DG_{19}	19 April 2010	list
(495769) 2017 EE_{6}	16 January 2010	list
(495816) 2017 FU_{108}	7 August 2010	list
(496123) 2010 CJ_{186}	10 February 2010	list
(496128) 2010 LJ_{10}	2 June 2010	list
(496129) 2010 MZ_{99}	29 June 2010	list
(496146) 2010 SO_{10}	14 June 2010	list
(496339) 2013 PR_{30}	12 April 2010	list
(496486) 2014 SF_{316}	10 May 2010	list
(496537) 2014 WE_{193}	23 April 2010	list
(496557) 2014 WK_{479}	13 May 2010	list
(496580) 2015 BE_{8}	5 May 2010	list
(496587) 2015 BH_{156}	15 January 2010	list
(496620) 2015 PN_{3}	7 August 2010	list

(496640) 2015 XJ_{128}	12 June 2010	list
(496803) 2017 JO_{1}	12 March 2010	list
(499387) 2010 AW_{85}	8 January 2010	list
(499388) 2010 AD_{89}	8 January 2010	list
(499390) 2010 AK_{93}	8 January 2010	list
(499391) 2010 AA_{131}	15 January 2010	list
(499395) 2010 BK_{9}	16 January 2010	list
(499396) 2010 BK_{26}	18 January 2010	list
(499397) 2010 BV_{29}	18 January 2010	list
(499398) 2010 BF_{48}	20 January 2010	list
(499400) 2010 BZ_{58}	21 January 2010	list
(499401) 2010 BL_{71}	23 January 2010	list
(499402) 2010 BJ_{74}	23 January 2010	list
(499404) 2010 BH_{81}	25 January 2010	list
(499405) 2010 BG_{87}	26 January 2010	list
(499406) 2010 BU_{98}	27 January 2010	list
(499407) 2010 BZ_{127}	31 January 2010	list
(499409) 2010 CL_{9}	8 February 2010	list
(499436) 2010 CL_{203}	4 February 2010	list
(499438) 2010 CL_{244}	3 February 2010	list
(499440) 2010 DP_{23}	18 February 2010	list
(499443) 2010 ED_{7}	3 March 2010	list
(499444) 2010 EW_{27}	11 March 2010	list
(499453) 2010 EQ_{98}	13 January 2010	list
(499467) 2010 GJ_{105}	30 January 2010	list

(499469) 2010 GA_{132}	1 February 2010	list
(499473) 2010 JA_{9}	1 May 2010	list
(499484) 2010 JP_{125}	12 May 2010	list
(499487) 2010 KM_{125}	31 May 2010	list
(499489) 2010 LQ_{93}	12 June 2010	list
(499491) 2010 MN_{52}	25 June 2010	list
(499492) 2010 MZ_{64}	25 June 2010	list
(499493) 2010 MY_{65}	25 June 2010	list
(499494) 2010 MM_{72}	25 June 2010	list
(499495) 2010 MV_{82}	27 June 2010	list
(499496) 2010 MR_{87}	22 June 2010	list
(499497) 2010 MA_{94}	28 June 2010	list
(499498) 2010 MB_{98}	29 June 2010	list
(499499) 2010 NS_{2}	11 July 2010	list
(499501) 2010 NP_{42}	9 July 2010	list
(499502) 2010 NE_{50}	9 July 2010	list
(499503) 2010 NO_{56}	10 July 2010	list
(499504) 2010 NZ_{86}	1 July 2010	list
(499505) 2010 OW_{11}	17 July 2010	list
(499506) 2010 OU_{14}	17 July 2010	list
(499508) 2010 OC_{38}	29 January 2010	list
(499509) 2010 OX_{39}	21 July 2010	list
(499510) 2010 OR_{85}	27 July 2010	list
(499511) 2010 OF_{88}	27 July 2010	list
(499512) 2010 OY_{103}	29 July 2010	list

(499513) 2010 OO_{114}	30 July 2010	list
(499518) 2010 PZ_{54}	15 February 2010	list
(499619) 2010 UC_{52}	24 July 2010	list
(499808) 2011 CD_{101}	1 February 2010	list
(499842) 2011 EN_{14}	20 February 2010	list
(499844) 2011 ES_{23}	16 January 2010	list
(499891) 2011 FY_{126}	22 January 2010	list
(499892) 2011 FE_{130}	21 January 2010	list
(499971) 2011 KM_{25}	31 March 2010	list
(499993) 2011 OJ_{34}	24 June 2010	list
(499994) 2011 OR_{41}	2 July 2010	list
(499995) 2011 OP_{45}	6 July 2010	list
(500014) 2011 QL_{47}	31 May 2010	list
(500043) 2011 SJ_{201}	14 July 2010	list
(500369) 2012 TV_{40}	12 July 2010	list
(500375) 2012 TX_{55}	8 February 2010	list
(500443) 2012 TJ_{172}	13 January 2010	list
(500490) 2012 TS_{261}	14 February 2010	list
(500579) 2012 UZ_{83}	7 July 2010	list
(500778) 2013 DR_{15}	24 February 2010	list
(500792) 2013 ER_{126}	11 April 2010	list
(500892) 2013 LO_{6}	9 August 2010	list
(500941) 2013 PB_{74}	1 March 2010	list
(501000) 2013 RS_{25}	5 February 2010	list
(501021) 2013 RW_{55}	20 January 2010	list

(501058) 2013 SH_{20}	14 February 2010	list
(501061) 2013 SX_{27}	7 February 2010	list
(501134) 2013 TO_{35}	28 February 2010	list
(501150) 2013 TV_{65}	14 February 2010	list
(501158) 2013 TM_{77}	21 January 2010	list
(501208) 2013 TS_{141}	17 March 2010	list
(501287) 2013 WR_{54}	6 June 2010	list
(501440) 2014 AW_{22}	10 February 2010	list
(501443) 2014 AB_{27}	6 August 2010	list
(501634) 2014 SH_{213}	22 June 2010	list
(501699) 2014 UN_{9}	12 January 2010	list
(501779) 2014 VB_{10}	28 May 2010	list
(501890) 2014 WR_{422}	26 March 2010	list
(501952) 2014 YP_{5}	23 June 2010	list
(501997) 2015 AZ_{28}	14 May 2010	list
(502025) 2015 AC_{96}	24 April 2010	list
(502063) 2015 AG_{179}	16 June 2010	list
(502085) 2015 AW_{238}	16 June 2010	list
(502124) 2015 BG_{13}	26 May 2010	list
(502128) 2015 BR_{16}	15 May 2010	list
(502147) 2015 BY_{31}	26 May 2010	list
(502171) 2015 BR_{59}	25 June 2010	list
(502204) 2015 BK_{74}	1 June 2010	list
(502215) 2015 BW_{82}	10 February 2010	list
(502236) 2015 BA_{91}	21 January 2010	list

(502254) 2015 BB_{113}	9 May 2010	list
(502265) 2015 BM_{122}	10 May 2010	list
(502269) 2015 BO_{125}	10 June 2010	list
(502282) 2015 BD_{138}	2 June 2010	list
(502330) 2015 BE_{169}	4 June 2010	list
(502355) 2015 BM_{213}	12 May 2010	list
(502378) 2015 BW_{242}	13 January 2010	list
(502405) 2015 BD_{253}	24 May 2010	list
(502413) 2015 BT_{254}	1 July 2010	list
(502414) 2015 BJ_{255}	19 January 2010	list
(502443) 2015 BT_{277}	12 January 2010	list
(502462) 2015 BE_{307}	9 May 2010	list
(502477) 2015 BN_{341}	26 June 2010	list
(502484) 2015 BX_{354}	27 January 2010	list
(502518) 2015 BC_{432}	10 June 2010	list
(502552) 2015 BD_{469}	15 February 2010	list
(502592) 2015 CS_{7}	14 January 2010	list
(502605) 2015 CC_{15}	22 January 2010	list
(502609) 2015 CF_{17}	13 January 2010	list
(502613) 2015 CE_{20}	12 June 2010	list
(502625) 2015 CG_{29}	11 June 2010	list
(502636) 2015 CZ_{32}	16 April 2010	list
(502645) 2015 CR_{42}	24 June 2010	list
(502649) 2015 CF_{43}	3 June 2010	list
(502709) 2015 DE_{22}	10 February 2010	list

(502751) 2015 DV_{48}	1 July 2010	list
(502773) 2015 DV_{83}	5 February 2010	list
(502793) 2015 DF_{100}	17 June 2010	list
(502815) 2015 DP_{121}	8 February 2010	list
(502818) 2015 DA_{127}	13 February 2010	list
(502831) 2015 DU_{149}	24 June 2010	list
(502884) 2015 DK_{217}	13 March 2010	list
(502913) 2015 EB_{17}	14 January 2010	list
(502916) 2015 EC_{19}	23 January 2010	list
(502920) 2015 EJ_{22}	23 January 2010	list
(502958) 2015 EL_{66}	29 January 2010	list
(502977) 2015 FP_{47}	14 January 2010	list
(502991) 2015 FH_{76}	2 May 2010	list
(503010) 2015 FW_{108}	2 May 2010	list
(503035) 2015 FX_{145}	16 February 2010	list
(503038) 2015 FG_{149}	20 March 2010	list
(503058) 2015 FC_{174}	13 March 2010	list
(503074) 2015 FN_{247}	1 February 2010	list
(503086) 2015 FF_{290}	15 February 2010	list
(503091) 2015 FR_{296}	14 March 2010	list
(503120) 2015 FX_{331}	16 January 2010	list
(503136) 2015 GJ_{7}	23 February 2010	list
(503160) 2015 GQ_{36}	11 June 2010	list
(503214) 2015 HX_{36}	11 April 2010	list
(503265) 2015 LK_{35}	10 June 2010	list

(503269) 2015 OB_{3}	18 June 2010	list
(503403) 2016 CG_{242}	8 April 2010	list
(503655) 2016 GW_{207}	16 January 2010	list
(503662) 2016 GH_{240}	10 July 2010	list
(503678) 2016 HR_{7}	20 January 2010	list
(503695) 2016 JP_{6}	27 May 2010	list
(503703) 2016 JO_{12}	5 February 2010	list
(503730) 2016 LF_{5}	27 January 2010	list
(503732) 2016 LV_{16}	12 June 2010	list
(503797) 2017 DT_{33}	16 June 2010	list
(503820) 2017 KC_{16}	6 April 2010	list
(503838) 2017 KR_{33}	19 April 2010	list
(503845) 2017 MV_{3}	18 May 2010	list
(504800) 2010 CO_{1}	31 January 2010	list
(504811) 2010 CN_{221}	8 February 2010	list
(504812) 2010 DB_{53}	22 February 2010	list
(504814) 2010 EW_{104}	12 January 2010	list
(504818) 2010 GH_{32}	26 January 2010	list
(504819) 2010 GL_{67}	17 January 2010	list
(504820) 2010 GW_{149}	15 April 2010	list
(504824) 2010 JW_{115}	17 February 2010	list
(504827) 2010 KZ_{117}	18 May 2010	list
(504830) 2010 MU_{24}	18 June 2010	list
(504831) 2010 MV_{75}	26 June 2010	list
(504834) 2010 NE_{88}	16 January 2010	list

(504835) 2010 OT_{25}	19 July 2010	list
(504836) 2010 PO_{14}	8 February 2010	list
(504842) 2010 RE_{137}	12 September 2010	list
(504868) 2010 UU_{81}	21 July 2010	list
(504920) 2011 BF_{74}	6 February 2010	list
(505011) 2011 OW_{39}	11 February 2010	list
(505013) 2011 PU_{5}	11 July 2010	list
(505015) 2011 QF_{1}	11 June 2010	list
(505017) 2011 QU_{2}	16 May 2010	list
(505018) 2011 QR_{16}	7 July 2010	list
(505021) 2011 QW_{24}	14 February 2010	list
(505036) 2011 QE_{92}	13 February 2010	list
(505044) 2011 RU_{11}	31 July 2010	list
(505051) 2011 SV_{34}	15 April 2010	list
(505066) 2011 SS_{173}	26 March 2010	list
(505088) 2011 UK_{326}	16 April 2010	list
(505092) 2011 UO_{407}	24 February 2010	list
(505096) 2011 WV_{39}	8 April 2010	list
(505197) 2012 TU_{152}	14 January 2010	list
(505287) 2012 VF_{86}	11 March 2010	list
(505381) 2013 JX_{46}	11 June 2010	list
(505540) 2013 YW_{82}	22 June 2010	list
(505547) 2013 YW_{126}	7 April 2010	list
(505570) 2014 BY_{10}	12 May 2010	list
(505575) 2014 BB_{24}	16 February 2010	list

(505581) 2014 BR_{47}	16 February 2010	list
(505589) 2014 CZ_{4}	20 April 2010	list
(505657) 2014 SR339	30 September 2014	list
(505663) 2014 UR_{5}	8 January 2010	list
(505777) 2015 BE_{268}	8 March 2010	list
(505812) 2015 BG_{425}	8 June 2010	list
(505869) 2015 DL_{94}	16 June 2010	list
(505909) 2015 EZ_{9}	30 January 2010	list
(505928) 2015 FV	14 March 2010	list
(505935) 2015 FT_{39}	11 February 2010	list
(505953) 2015 FL_{178}	23 February 2010	list
(505956) 2015 FW_{213}	8 July 2010	list
(505976) 2015 FG_{335}	26 March 2010	list
(505978) 2015 FF_{368}	1 June 2010	list
(505982) 2015 GX_{27}	8 February 2010	list
(506007) 2015 HB_{22}	12 March 2010	list
(506011) 2015 HM_{51}	12 February 2010	list
(506014) 2015 HB_{63}	20 March 2010	list
(506021) 2015 HO_{98}	29 May 2010	list
(506024) 2015 HL_{103}	9 March 2010	list
(506039) 2015 KV_{65}	18 April 2010	list
(506049) 2015 KC_{105}	11 March 2010	list
(506060) 2015 LF_{39}	30 April 2010	list
(506074) 2015 UM_{67}	24 October 2015	list
(506120) 2016 BM_{67}	31 March 2010	list

(506167) 2016 FS_{11}	30 April 2010	list
(506233) 2016 MX_{2}	9 August 2010	list
(506236) 2016 NV_{9}	8 April 2010	list
(506252) 2016 PE_{24}	3 April 2010	list
(506268) 2016 QH_{65}	28 March 2010	list
(506289) 2017 BS_{43}	12 January 2010	list
(506291) 2017 DQ_{13}	12 January 2010	list
(506293) 2017 DX_{102}	18 January 2010	list
(506325) 2017 OZ_{9}	14 June 2010	list
(506376) 2017 QY_{30}	12 April 2010	list
(507164) 2010 BE_{33}	18 January 2010	list
(507171) 2010 DP_{80}	16 February 2010	list
(507176) 2010 GJ_{161}	26 January 2010	list
(507181) 2010 JK_{86}	11 May 2010	list
(507185) 2010 PT_{43}	6 August 2010	list
(507186) 2010 PC_{53}	8 August 2010	list
(507310) 2011 QF_{9}	21 July 2010	list
(507312) 2011 QS_{22}	12 July 2010	list
(507359) 2011 WX_{64}	25 April 2010	list
(507362) 2011 WN_{146}	9 June 2010	list
(507367) 2011 YW_{21}	19 June 2010	list
(507370) 2011 YF_{75}	28 January 2010	list
(507371) 2012 AL_{21}	1 July 2010	list
(507758) 2013 YG_{66}	25 May 2010	list
(507781) 2014 AF_{12}	19 April 2010	list

(507784) 2014 AJ_{44}	19 January 2010	list
(507786) 2014 AF_{56}	22 April 2010	list
(507825) 2014 DO_{142}	13 January 2010	list
(508097) 2015 DN_{133}	26 February 2010	list
(508119) 2015 DX_{228}	29 May 2010	list
(508147) 2015 FM_{94}	14 February 2010	list
(508210) 2015 GV_{16}	12 April 2010	list
(508213) 2015 GF_{22}	18 March 2010	list
(508229) 2015 HM_{4}	15 February 2010	list
(508263) 2015 HK_{134}	15 April 2010	list
(508288) 2015 KP_{12}	10 April 2010	list
(508300) 2015 KQ_{37}	2 April 2010	list
(508304) 2015 KT_{53}	11 May 2010	list
(508310) 2015 KK_{96}	13 April 2010	list
(508323) 2015 LR_{24}	14 April 2010	list
(508335) 2015 NC_{13}	27 April 2010	list
(508383) 2016 FH_{62}	27 June 2010	list
(508453) 2016 NF_{1}	27 September 2010	list
(508484) 2016 PD_{66}	13 March 2010	list
(508505) 2016 QY_{20}	20 April 2010	list
(508510) 2016 QC_{37}	28 February 2010	list
(508522) 2016 QB_{85}	24 April 2010	list
(508526) 2016 RX_{6}	28 April 2010	list
(508550) 2016 UZ_{30}	12 July 2010	list
(508553) 2016 UX_{45}	12 July 2010	list

(508562) 2016 VU	11 April 2010	list
(508574) 2017 NO_{5}	13 February 2010	list
(508579) 2017 OP_{7}	4 April 2010	list
(510023) 2010 AT_{125}	14 January 2010	list
(510024) 2010 BW_{60}	21 January 2010	list
(510025) 2010 BX_{99}	27 January 2010	list
(510026) 2010 BH_{130}	1 February 2010	list
(510028) 2010 CL_{17}	11 February 2010	list
(510040) 2010 CP_{206}	4 February 2010	list
(510042) 2010 DB_{64}	26 February 2010	list
(510055) 2010 FH_{81}	30 March 2010	list
(510062) 2010 GE_{159}	16 January 2010	list
(510064) 2010 HO_{45}	23 April 2010	list
(510065) 2010 HG_{59}	24 April 2010	list
(510066) 2010 HG_{74}	28 April 2010	list
(510074) 2010 JQ_{111}	7 February 2010	list
(510081) 2010 KP_{97}	28 May 2010	list
(510082) 2010 KL_{100}	28 May 2010	list
(510083) 2010 KC_{114}	30 May 2010	list
(510084) 2010 KB_{117}	30 May 2010	list
(510089) 2010 MD_{36}	21 June 2010	list
(510090) 2010 MY_{93}	28 June 2010	list
(510092) 2010 OX_{6}	19 January 2010	list
(510093) 2010 OK_{10}	17 July 2010	list
(510094) 2010 OS_{40}	21 July 2010	list

(510095) 2010 ON_{55}	23 July 2010	list
(510096) 2010 OD_{64}	29 January 2010	list
(510097) 2010 OF_{126}	23 July 2010	list
(510100) 2010 PY_{70}	10 August 2010	list
(510101) 2010 RE_{8}	13 June 2010	list
(510286) 2011 LM_{28}	9 February 2010	list
(510362) 2011 SM_{254}	16 July 2010	list
(510422) 2011 UG_{294}	8 May 2010	list
(510523) 2012 CW_{38}	28 July 2010	list
(510763) 2012 YA_{9}	3 March 2010	list
(510766) 2013 AA_{23}	18 May 2010	list
(510897) 2013 CC_{190}	14 July 2010	list
(510898) 2013 CS_{190}	2 July 2010	list
(510992) 2013 JX_{35}	2 May 2010	list
(511008) 2013 PX_{6}	12 January 2010	list
(511109) 2013 WP	19 March 2010	list
(511135) 2013 XR_{19}	25 January 2010	list
(511154) 2013 YS_{38}	7 June 2010	list
(511171) 2013 YM_{62}	5 June 2010	list
(511175) 2013 YO_{73}	5 March 2010	list
(511229) 2014 BC_{8}	26 May 2010	list
(511232) 2014 BG_{12}	26 June 2010	list
(511241) 2014 BR_{29}	27 May 2010	list
(511243) 2014 BS_{32}	20 March 2010	list
(511259) 2014 CC	22 June 2010	list

(511266) 2014 CH_{20}	26 March 2010	list
(511294) 2014 DR_{65}	27 January 2010	list
(511346) 2014 ET_{44}	4 July 2010	list
(511348) 2014 EU_{47}	19 January 2010	list
(511364) 2014 FU_{36}	24 February 2010	list
(511373) 2014 FG_{65}	17 January 2010	list
(511377) 2014 FO_{73}	13 June 2010	list
(511399) 2014 GS_{56}	19 March 2010	list
(511412) 2014 HM_{127}	6 June 2010	list
(511432) 2014 HL_{201}	7 July 2010	list
(511473) 2014 KY_{98}	15 June 2010	list
(511903) 2015 HK_{42}	8 April 2010	list
(511965) 2015 KN_{17}	16 May 2010	list
(511973) 2015 KO_{47}	12 June 2010	list
(511975) 2015 KH_{58}	21 May 2010	list
(511984) 2015 KJ_{88}	9 May 2010	list
(512083) 2015 NV_{14}	28 July 2010	list
(512088) 2015 OH_{3}	25 June 2010	list
(512089) 2015 OO_{7}	21 June 2010	list
(512160) 2015 RB_{29}	23 July 2010	list
(512414) 2016 PY_{81}	29 April 2010	list
(512418) 2016 PV_{86}	9 May 2010	list
(512431) 2016 PK_{90}	23 April 2010	list
(512477) 2016 QV_{61}	9 February 2010	list
(512500) 2016 RE_{6}	22 May 2010	list

(512530) 2016 RN_{43}	19 May 2010	list
(512542) 2016 SK_{8}	16 May 2010	list
(512689) 2016 UK_{1}	17 April 2010	list
(512737) 2016 UT_{28}	18 June 2010	list
(512740) 2016 UH_{29}	25 May 2010	list
(512750) 2016 UF_{35}	30 May 2010	list
(512758) 2016 UP_{46}	25 April 2010	list
(512764) 2016 UF_{54}	21 June 2010	list
(512792) 2016 UJ_{77}	28 January 2010	list
(512840) 2016 UD_{139}	23 June 2010	list
(512845) 2016 UO_{145}	13 June 2010	list
(512864) 2016 VC_{19}	17 July 2010	list
(512886) 2016 WR_{23}	28 April 2010	list
(512894) 2016 WV_{33}	29 June 2010	list
(512913) 2016 XT_{4}	8 August 2010	list
(512921) 2016 XJ_{10}	28 July 2010	list
(512925) 2016 XW_{19}	7 January 2010	list
(512933) 2017 AD_{13}	24 March 2010	list
(512945) 2017 BF_{93}	27 April 2010	list
(512953) 2017 FV_{157}	21 March 2010	list
(513024) 2017 VF_{3}	26 March 2010	list
(513026) 2017 VP_{3}	16 April 2010	list
(513052) 2017 VM_{10}	13 April 2010	list
(513093) 2017 WL_{22}	16 June 2010	list
(513530) 2010 CY_{16}	11 February 2010	list

(513544) 2010 JC_{104}	12 May 2010	list
(513545) 2010 JB_{122}	8 February 2010	list
(513546) 2010 LZ_{14}	24 February 2010	list
(513547) 2010 MG_{40}	22 June 2010	list
(513550) 2010 NG_{3}	8 July 2010	list
(513551) 2010 NQ_{36}	8 July 2010	list
(513553) 2010 ND_{104}	12 July 2010	list
(513554) 2010 OS_{45}	22 July 2010	list
(513555) 2010 OK_{79}	26 July 2010	list
(513556) 2010 OY_{85}	27 July 2010	list
(513562) 2010 TX_{58}	15 July 2010	list
(513566) 2010 UO_{12}	15 July 2010	list
(513570) 2010 VY_{12}	13 July 2010	list
(513636) 2011 QW_{43}	16 January 2010	list
(513682) 2011 YR_{79}	19 June 2010	list
(513683) 2012 AJ_{1}	30 May 2010	list
(513684) 2012 AY_{14}	18 July 2010	list
(513689) 2012 BY_{67}	19 June 2010	list
(513827) 2013 EB_{52}	4 August 2010	list
(513914) 2014 AH_{25}	28 March 2010	list
(513952) 2014 DC_{147}	13 January 2010	list
(513955) 2014 EO_{4}	12 January 2010	list
(514020) 2014 JS_{85}	27 June 2010	list
(514041) 2014 MQ_{18}	22 June 2014	list
(514046) 2014 ML_{63}	18 May 2010	list

(514212) 2015 NP_{23}	16 July 2010	list
(514248) 2015 PP_{52}	29 May 2010	list
(514260) 2015 PF_{309}	14 April 2010	list
(514284) 2015 RV_{252}	27 July 2010	list
(514379) 2016 RP_{27}	30 April 2010	list
(514382) 2016 RJ_{33}	25 May 2010	list
(514401) 2016 SB_{50}	17 July 2010	list
(514468) 2016 UT_{139}	30 June 2010	list
(514526) 2016 WU_{56}	7 July 2010	list
(514540) 2017 BJ_{91}	19 April 2010	list
(514543) 2017 DL_{1}	21 April 2010	list
(514545) 2017 EO_{18}	29 January 2010	list
(514566) 2017 YK	8 August 2010	list
(515041) 2010 CU_{19}	11 February 2010	list
(515051) 2010 GA	1 April 2010	list
(515058) 2010 JY_{175}	30 January 2010	list
(515060) 2010 LO_{55}	9 June 2010	list
(515061) 2010 LM_{71}	10 June 2010	list
(515062) 2010 LV_{72}	10 June 2010	list
(515063) 2010 MO_{61}	24 June 2010	list
(515064) 2010 MO_{62}	24 June 2010	list
(515067) 2010 NH_{60}	11 July 2010	list
(515068) 2010 NO_{113}	13 July 2010	list
(515069) 2010 OG_{32}	20 July 2010	list
(515071) 2010 OU_{34}	21 July 2010	list

(515072) 2010 OF_{58}	23 July 2010	list
(515073) 2010 OL_{111}	29 July 2010	list
(515075) 2010 PZ_{67}	9 August 2010	list
(515138) 2011 HZ	15 February 2010	list
(515215) 2012 AV_{8}	21 June 2010	list
(515222) 2012 BM_{50}	6 August 2010	list
(515260) 2012 QM_{52}	8 January 2010	list
(515472) 2014 AN_{10}	31 March 2010	list
(515526) 2014 FK_{64}	4 July 2010	list
(515530) 2014 GG_{5}	17 January 2010	list
(515559) 2014 HD_{23}	17 April 2010	list
(515560) 2014 HF_{23}	28 May 2010	list
(515599) 2014 JC_{53}	28 March 2010	list
(515600) 2014 JX_{62}	29 April 2010	list
(515621) 2014 KB_{104}	30 April 2010	list
(515622) 2014 KC_{104}	14 July 2010	list
(515704) 2014 QD_{366}	3 February 2010	list
(515831) 2015 MF_{136}	5 August 2010	list
(515835) 2015 NC_{6}	30 June 2010	list
(515846) 2015 OK_{31}	24 July 2010	list
(515868) 2015 OM_{88}	9 July 2010	list
(515879) 2015 PY_{12}	13 May 2010	list
(515911) 2015 PB_{290}	9 June 2010	list
(516020) 2015 SK_{6}	1 June 2010	list
(516070) 2015 TD_{234}	8 August 2010	list

(516272) 2016 WW_{5}	11 June 2010	list
(516300) 2016 XD_{4}	27 May 2010	list
(516302) 2016 XQ_{6}	14 May 2010	list
(516341) 2017 BZ_{64}	24 July 2010	list
(516347) 2017 BB_{92}	2 May 2010	list
(516371) 2017 DG_{116}	22 April 2010	list
(516381) 2018 CY_{7}	22 June 2010	list
(516788) 2010 BW_{109}	29 January 2010	list
(516789) 2010 BH_{120}	30 January 2010	list
(516795) 2010 GZ_{62}	10 April 2010	list
(516805) 2010 KU_{20}	17 May 2010	list
(516806) 2010 KN_{35}	19 May 2010	list
(516807) 2010 KK_{98}	28 May 2010	list
(516809) 2010 LC_{119}	14 June 2010	list
(516810) 2010 MR_{12}	17 June 2010	list
(516813) 2010 NU_{42}	9 July 2010	list
(516814) 2010 OT_{21}	18 July 2010	list
(516815) 2010 OD_{75}	25 July 2010	list
(516816) 2010 OG_{79}	26 July 2010	list
(516818) 2010 OS_{99}	28 July 2010	list
(516823) 2010 SY_{23}	9 June 2010	list
(516892) 2011 OE_{43}	29 May 2010	list
(516893) 2011 QO_{20}	14 June 2010	list
(516935) 2012 AM_{13}	18 June 2010	list
(516937) 2012 BB	24 July 2010	list

(516963) 2012 DE_{90}	7 August 2010	list
(517044) 2013 AG_{29}	24 May 2010	list
(517137) 2013 JR_{27}	26 January 2010	list
(517247) 2014 DV_{32}	4 April 2010	list
(517324) 2014 JK_{17}	10 April 2010	list
(517331) 2014 JB_{43}	27 April 2010	list
(517367) 2014 KC_{29}	11 March 2010	list
(517396) 2014 KR_{105}	13 June 2010	list
(517402) 2014 LN_{10}	16 February 2010	list
(517404) 2014 LB_{14}	2 March 2010	list
(517407) 2014 LG_{21}	1 July 2010	list
(517420) 2014 MF_{21}	11 April 2010	list
(517443) 2014 OO_{131}	28 February 2010	list
(517488) 2014 QE_{225}	7 February 2010	list
(517515) 2014 QN_{451}	25 February 2010	list
(517544) 2014 SG_{285}	5 March 2010	list
(517672) 2015 CE_{17}	23 January 2010	list
(517751) 2015 NY_{18}	14 February 2010	list
(517791) 2015 PT_{56}	18 February 2010	list
(517797) 2015 PD_{304}	15 June 2010	list
(517907) 2015 TR_{116}	13 January 2010	list
(517934) 2015 TD_{240}	29 July 2010	list
(517940) 2015 TZ_{276}	29 July 2010	list
(517986) 2015 UV_{21}	3 June 2010	list
(518336) 2017 BE_{131}	15 August 2010	list

(518348) 2017 DS_{4}	13 January 2010	list
(518354) 2017 DB_{40}	27 June 2010	list
(518395) 2017 UV_{13}	8 March 2010	list
(518399) 2017 VM_{23}	28 April 2010	list
(518408) 2018 CO_{6}	21 July 2010	list
(518780) 2010 AH_{137}	15 January 2010	list
(518781) 2010 AL_{138}	15 January 2010	list
(518786) 2010 BV_{20}	17 January 2010	list
(518789) 2010 BH_{53}	20 January 2010	list
(518790) 2010 BO_{53}	20 January 2010	list
(518792) 2010 BQ_{68}	22 January 2010	list
(518795) 2010 BH_{84}	25 January 2010	list
(518797) 2010 BP_{88}	26 January 2010	list
(518798) 2010 BU_{91}	27 January 2010	list
(518801) 2010 BM_{94}	27 January 2010	list
(518802) 2010 BU_{97}	27 January 2010	list
(518804) 2010 BP_{110}	29 January 2010	list
(518806) 2010 BY_{126}	31 January 2010	list
(518807) 2010 BV_{127}	31 January 2010	list
(518808) 2010 CN_{7}	7 February 2010	list
(518809) 2010 CE_{14}	10 February 2010	list
(518812) 2010 CC_{46}	11 February 2010	list
(518813) 2010 CH_{48}	12 February 2010	list
(518814) 2010 CG_{49}	12 February 2010	list
(518816) 2010 CZ_{53}	14 February 2010	list

(518822) 2010 CW_{134}	10 February 2010	list
(518823) 2010 CD_{140}	15 February 2010	list
(518829) 2010 CJ_{187}	11 February 2010	list
(518830) 2010 CH_{195}	13 February 2010	list
(518831) 2010 CJ_{195}	13 February 2010	list
(518834) 2010 CM_{200}	15 February 2010	list
(518835) 2010 CV_{221}	8 February 2010	list
(518837) 2010 CX_{223}	8 February 2010	list
(518838) 2010 CJ_{228}	9 February 2010	list
(518839) 2010 CD_{232}	1 February 2010	list
(518840) 2010 CB_{234}	1 February 2010	list
(518844) 2010 CH_{243}	2 February 2010	list
(518848) 2010 DA_{15}	16 February 2010	list
(518849) 2010 DO_{17}	16 February 2010	list
(518850) 2010 DK_{19}	16 February 2010	list
(518851) 2010 DX_{29}	19 February 2010	list
(518852) 2010 DG_{30}	19 February 2010	list
(518857) 2010 DM_{60}	25 February 2010	list
(518858) 2010 DK_{61}	25 February 2010	list
(518861) 2010 DW_{65}	27 February 2010	list
(518863) 2010 DM_{73}	28 February 2010	list
(518865) 2010 DB_{86}	26 February 2010	list
(518879) 2010 EG_{50}	12 March 2010	list
(518883) 2010 EB_{148}	9 March 2010	list
(518885) 2010 ET_{154}	12 March 2010	list

(518886) 2010 EK_{157}	13 March 2010	list
(518894) 2010 FF_{36}	18 March 2010	list
(518901) 2010 FW_{73}	30 March 2010	list
(518904) 2010 FV_{79}	1 April 2010	list
(518907) 2010 FW_{107}	20 March 2010	list
(518912) 2010 FC_{121}	31 March 2010	list
(518919) 2010 GS_{37}	6 April 2010	list
(518920) 2010 GD_{43}	7 April 2010	list
(518927) 2010 GP_{64}	9 April 2010	list
(518929) 2010 GT_{75}	10 April 2010	list
(518932) 2010 GM_{91}	13 April 2010	list
(518933) 2010 GW_{92}	14 April 2010	list
(518934) 2010 GE_{94}	14 April 2010	list
(518942) 2010 GV_{153}	15 April 2010	list
(518944) 2010 GH_{166}	2 April 2010	list
(518951) 2010 HN_{8}	17 April 2010	list
(518952) 2010 HD_{10}	17 April 2010	list
(518953) 2010 HK_{11}	17 April 2010	list
(518954) 2010 HG_{13}	17 April 2010	list
(518955) 2010 HH_{14}	18 April 2010	list
(518956) 2010 HY_{19}	18 April 2010	list
(518958) 2010 HR_{28}	19 April 2010	list
(518960) 2010 HF_{35}	20 April 2010	list
(518965) 2010 HJ_{45}	23 April 2010	list
(518966) 2010 HL_{45}	23 April 2010	list

(518967) 2010 HN_{47}	24 April 2010	list
(518969) 2010 HL_{50}	24 April 2010	list
(518970) 2010 HU_{51}	24 April 2010	list
(518974) 2010 HC_{66}	26 April 2010	list
(518976) 2010 HH_{67}	27 April 2010	list
(518978) 2010 HA_{76}	28 April 2010	list
(518981) 2010 HO_{95}	29 April 2010	list
(518985) 2010 JO_{10}	2 May 2010	list
(518987) 2010 JN_{12}	2 May 2010	list
(518995) 2010 JR_{57}	7 May 2010	list
(518997) 2010 JW_{59}	8 May 2010	list
(518999) 2010 JU_{61}	8 May 2010	list
(519001) 2010 JQ_{69}	9 May 2010	list
(519002) 2010 JD_{70}	9 May 2010	list
(519004) 2010 JP_{92}	10 May 2010	list
(519005) 2010 JA_{93}	10 May 2010	list
(519006) 2010 JX_{94}	10 May 2010	list
(519007) 2010 JG_{95}	11 May 2010	list
(519013) 2010 JD_{103}	12 May 2010	list
(519020) 2010 JC_{131}	13 May 2010	list
(519021) 2010 JH_{132}	13 May 2010	list
(519023) 2010 JG_{134}	14 May 2010	list
(519025) 2010 JC_{137}	14 May 2010	list
(519026) 2010 JP_{137}	14 May 2010	list
(519031) 2010 JR_{146}	16 May 2010	list

(519035) 2010 KJ_{5}	16 May 2010	list
(519036) 2010 KM_{11}	17 May 2010	list
(519037) 2010 KA_{13}	16 May 2010	list
(519038) 2010 KJ_{14}	16 May 2010	list
(519039) 2010 KO_{18}	17 May 2010	list
(519041) 2010 KH_{27}	18 May 2010	list
(519044) 2010 KD_{32}	19 May 2010	list
(519045) 2010 KE_{33}	19 May 2010	list
(519046) 2010 KU_{35}	19 May 2010	list
(519047) 2010 KZ_{46}	21 May 2010	list
(519050) 2010 KA_{54}	23 May 2010	list
(519051) 2010 KC_{75}	25 May 2010	list
(519053) 2010 KH_{83}	26 May 2010	list
(519055) 2010 KM_{84}	26 May 2010	list
(519056) 2010 KB_{86}	26 May 2010	list
(519058) 2010 KY_{92}	27 May 2010	list
(519061) 2010 KP_{106}	29 May 2010	list
(519062) 2010 KE_{108}	29 May 2010	list
(519064) 2010 KY_{110}	30 May 2010	list
(519066) 2010 KE_{115}	30 May 2010	list
(519067) 2010 KN_{119}	30 May 2010	list
(519068) 2010 KS_{126}	1 June 2010	list
(519070) 2010 LJ_{2}	1 June 2010	list
(519072) 2010 LC_{11}	2 June 2010	list
(519074) 2010 LP_{18}	3 June 2010	list

(519075) 2010 LQ_{18}	3 June 2010	list
(519076) 2010 LJ_{23}	4 June 2010	list
(519077) 2010 LR_{24}	5 June 2010	list
(519078) 2010 LB_{26}	5 June 2010	list
(519079) 2010 LS_{32}	6 June 2010	list
(519085) 2010 LT_{54}	9 June 2010	list
(519092) 2010 LA_{87}	11 June 2010	list
(519095) 2010 LV_{89}	12 June 2010	list
(519099) 2010 LV_{100}	13 June 2010	list
(519100) 2010 LH_{101}	13 June 2010	list
(519101) 2010 LY_{102}	13 June 2010	list
(519102) 2010 LD_{114}	14 June 2010	list
(519109) 2010 MN_{9}	16 June 2010	list
(519110) 2010 MA_{10}	16 June 2010	list
(519111) 2010 MQ_{15}	17 June 2010	list
(519114) 2010 MS_{24}	18 June 2010	list
(519115) 2010 MA_{25}	19 June 2010	list
(519116) 2010 MR_{27}	19 June 2010	list
(519117) 2010 MB_{29}	20 June 2010	list
(519119) 2010 MF_{34}	21 June 2010	list
(519125) 2010 MD_{46}	23 June 2010	list
(519129) 2010 MT_{63}	24 June 2010	list
(519130) 2010 MW_{66}	25 June 2010	list
(519131) 2010 MC_{76}	26 June 2010	list
(519132) 2010 MB_{80}	27 June 2010	list

(519134) 2010 MR_{86}	27 June 2010	list
(519135) 2010 MB_{96}	28 June 2010	list
(519137) 2010 MY_{97}	29 June 2010	list
(519144) 2010 ND_{14}	5 July 2010	list
(519147) 2010 NQ_{19}	6 July 2010	list
(519149) 2010 NL_{42}	9 July 2010	list
(519150) 2010 NT_{42}	9 July 2010	list
(519151) 2010 NR_{43}	9 July 2010	list
(519153) 2010 NG_{47}	9 July 2010	list
(519154) 2010 NO_{50}	9 July 2010	list
(519157) 2010 NM_{78}	15 July 2010	list
(519158) 2010 NW_{80}	15 July 2010	list
(519159) 2010 NX_{88}	2 July 2010	list
(519161) 2010 NU_{102}	12 July 2010	list
(519162) 2010 NG_{104}	12 July 2010	list
(519163) 2010 NB_{105}	12 July 2010	list
(519164) 2010 NR_{105}	12 July 2010	list
(519165) 2010 NN_{110}	13 July 2010	list
(519166) 2010 NN_{118}	29 April 2010	list
(519167) 2010 OA_{2}	16 July 2010	list
(519168) 2010 OT_{6}	16 July 2010	list
(519170) 2010 OW_{22}	18 July 2010	list
(519173) 2010 OO_{55}	23 July 2010	list
(519174) 2010 OM_{64}	24 July 2010	list
(519180) 2010 OD_{97}	28 July 2010	list

(519181) 2010 OC_{107}	29 July 2010	list
(519182) 2010 OV_{109}	30 July 2010	list
(519184) 2010 OP_{111}	30 July 2010	list
(519188) 2010 PK_{7}	1 August 2010	list
(519190) 2010 PX_{18}	4 August 2010	list
(519191) 2010 PD_{21}	4 August 2010	list
(519192) 2010 PB_{35}	5 August 2010	list
(519194) 2010 PE_{50}	12 February 2010	list
(519195) 2010 PF_{50}	29 January 2010	list
(519198) 2010 PZ_{77}	13 August 2010	list
(519213) 2010 TY_{61}	23 June 2010	list
(519729) 2013 CH_{207}	10 July 2010	list
(519836) 2013 LL_{1}	29 January 2010	list
(519838) 2013 LZ_{26}	5 February 2010	list
(520046) 2013 VP_{29}	2 May 2010	list
(520118) 2014 AE_{59}	25 June 2010	list
(520187) 2014 DC_{98}	7 April 2010	list
(520397) 2014 JB_{42}	14 March 2010	list
(520808) 2014 TF_{64}	5 October 2014	list
(520827) 2014 UU_{216}	1 March 2010	list
(520854) 2014 UZ_{239}	24 February 2010	list
(520931) 2014 WC_{535}	30 January 2010	list
(520969) 2014 YA_{63}	26 May 2010	list
(521075) 2015 DT_{239}	24 March 2010	list
(521473) 2015 OV_{92}	10 August 2010	list

(521531) 2015 OX_{99}	6 August 2010	list
(521544) 2015 OK_{101}	17 July 2010	list
(521620) 2015 PG_{321}	8 August 2010	list
(521704) 2015 RZ_{263}	29 June 2010	list
(521799) 2015 TU_{71}	13 April 2010	list
(522001) 2015 XS_{79}	25 May 2010	list
(522466) 2016 CU_{321}	19 February 2010	list
(522990) 2016 PY_{119}	2 May 2010	list
(523218) 2016 WF_{11}	1 May 2010	list
(523365) 2017 CE_{34}	13 February 2010	list
(523405) 2017 DC_{116}	18 July 2010	list
(523450) 2017 FO_{42}	26 March 2010	list
(523453) 2017 FU_{58}	10 February 2010	list
(523456) 2017 FC_{69}	7 February 2010	list
(523457) 2017 FR_{75}	30 January 2010	list
(523469) 2017 FP_{126}	8 August 2010	list
(523504) 2017 JV_{3}	3 April 2010	list
(523584) 2018 FE_{27}	19 February 2010	list
(523636) 2010 EX_{119}	13 March 2010	list
(523637) 2010 LT_{108}	13 June 2010	list
(523638) 2010 MQ_{1}	19 February 2010	list
(524759) 2003 UA_{313}	7 July 2010	list
(529474) 2010 AL_{106}	12 January 2010	list
(529476) 2010 AC_{115}	13 January 2010	list
(529477) 2010 AJ_{116}	13 January 2010	list

(529480) 2010 AR_{120}	14 January 2010	list
(529482) 2010 AH_{128}	14 January 2010	list
(529487) 2010 BX_{5}	13 January 2010	list
(529489) 2010 BO_{13}	16 January 2010	list
(529490) 2010 BS_{14}	16 January 2010	list
(529495) 2010 BC_{33}	18 January 2010	list
(529496) 2010 BP_{33}	18 January 2010	list
(529497) 2010 BX_{50}	20 January 2010	list
(529499) 2010 BH_{67}	22 January 2010	list
(529500) 2010 BW_{74}	24 January 2010	list
(529502) 2010 BB_{81}	25 January 2010	list
(529503) 2010 BQ_{82}	25 January 2010	list
(529504) 2010 BC_{94}	27 January 2010	list
(529507) 2010 BO_{97}	27 January 2010	list
(529508) 2010 BD_{100}	27 January 2010	list
(529509) 2010 BG_{101}	27 January 2010	list
(529517) 2010 CA_{51}	13 February 2010	list
(529527) 2010 CK_{131}	9 February 2010	list
(529544) 2010 CO_{197}	13 February 2010	list
(529547) 2010 CB_{227}	9 February 2010	list
(529547) 2010 CF_{227}	9 February 2010	list
(529554) 2010 DJ_{15}	16 February 2010	list
(529555) 2010 DX_{18}	16 February 2010	list
(529566) 2010 DW_{57}	24 February 2010	list
(529567) 2010 DB_{69}	27 February 2010	list

(529574) 2010 EQ_{7}	3 March 2010	list
(529575) 2010 EB_{18}	4 March 2010	list
(529576) 2010 ER_{18}	8 March 2010	list
(529579) 2010 EH_{38}	12 January 2010	list
(529584) 2010 EG_{119}	16 March 2010	list
(529587) 2010 EY_{134}	16 March 2010	list
(529588) 2010 EL_{135}	16 March 2010	list
(529590) 2010 EX_{147}	9 March 2010	list
(529598) 2010 FY_{12}	14 January 2010	list
(529600) 2010 FE_{32}	16 March 2010	list
(529601) 2010 FY_{39}	19 March 2010	list
(529604) 2010 FM_{60}	26 March 2010	list
(529605) 2010 FP_{66}	29 March 2010	list
(529609) 2010 FK_{117}	29 March 2010	list
(529613) 2010 GQ_{10}	2 April 2010	list
(529615) 2010 GJ_{17}	3 April 2010	list
(529617) 2010 GX_{29}	9 January 2010	list
(529622) 2010 GJ_{76}	10 April 2010	list
(529624) 2010 GF_{92}	14 April 2010	list
(529630) 2010 GW_{158}	24 January 2010	list
(529637) 2010 HK_{5}	16 April 2010	list
(529642) 2010 HR_{36}	21 April 2010	list
(529643) 2010 HV_{46}	23 April 2010	list
(529644) 2010 HF_{50}	24 April 2010	list
(529646) 2010 HL_{55}	25 April 2010	list

(529649) 2010 HK_{76}	28 April 2010	list
(529651) 2010 HX_{83}	28 April 2010	list
(529653) 2010 HM_{87}	29 April 2010	list
(529654) 2010 HC_{88}	29 April 2010	list
(529656) 2010 HQ_{90}	29 April 2010	list
(529666) 2010 JK_{5}	1 May 2010	list
(529671) 2010 JD_{35}	11 February 2010	list
(529674) 2010 JG_{75}	10 February 2010	list
(529684) 2010 JW_{130}	13 May 2010	list
(529685) 2010 JS_{135}	14 May 2010	list
(529689) 2010 JF_{146}	16 May 2010	list
(529695) 2010 KC_{14}	17 May 2010	list
(529696) 2010 KU_{17}	17 May 2010	list
(529697) 2010 KR_{20}	17 May 2010	list
(529700) 2010 KN_{32}	19 May 2010	list
(529701) 2010 KR_{46}	21 May 2010	list
(529702) 2010 KU_{48}	22 May 2010	list
(529703) 2010 KQ_{55}	23 May 2010	list
(529706) 2010 KN_{69}	23 May 2010	list
(529708) 2010 KG_{83}	26 May 2010	list
(529709) 2010 KX_{88}	27 May 2010	list
(529710) 2010 KR_{90}	27 May 2010	list
(529712) 2010 KZ_{98}	28 May 2010	list
(529713) 2010 KN_{99}	28 May 2010	list
(529715) 2010 KL_{119}	31 May 2010	list

(529717) 2010 KG_{126}	31 May 2010	list
(529718) 2010 KY_{127}	31 May 2010	list
(529720) 2010 LM_{14}	2 June 2010	list
(529721) 2010 LV_{21}	4 June 2010	list
(529722) 2010 LA_{22}	4 June 2010	list
(529724) 2010 LR_{29}	6 June 2010	list
(529725) 2010 LF_{37}	6 June 2010	list
(529727) 2010 LC_{44}	7 June 2010	list
(529728) 2010 LM_{44}	7 June 2010	list
(529730) 2010 LE_{48}	8 June 2010	list
(529733) 2010 LK_{52}	8 June 2010	list
(529735) 2010 LN_{57}	9 June 2010	list
(529739) 2010 LC_{88}	12 June 2010	list
(529740) 2010 LP_{88}	12 June 2010	list
(529742) 2010 LF_{102}	13 June 2010	list
(529743) 2010 LT_{103}	13 June 2010	list
(529744) 2010 LE_{113}	19 April 2010	list
(529745) 2010 LJ_{121}	14 June 2010	list
(529747) 2010 LS_{123}	14 June 2010	list
(529748) 2010 LP_{126}	15 June 2010	list
(529751) 2010 LC_{130}	15 June 2010	list
(529756) 2010 MG_{15}	17 June 2010	list
(529757) 2010 MX_{15}	17 June 2010	list
(529762) 2010 MS_{45}	23 June 2010	list
(529764) 2010 MM_{50}	23 June 2010	list

(529766) 2010 MS_{56}	24 June 2010	list
(529767) 2010 MS_{58}	24 June 2010	list
(529768) 2010 ME_{70}	25 June 2010	list
(529772) 2010 ML_{85}	27 June 2010	list
(529774) 2010 MT_{97}	14 January 2010	list
(529775) 2010 MX_{98}	29 June 2010	list
(529781) 2010 NX	3 July 2010	list
(529783) 2010 NP_{36}	8 July 2010	list
(529784) 2010 NK_{70}	14 July 2010	list
(529786) 2010 NB_{79}	15 July 2010	list
(529787) 2010 NR_{84}	1 July 2010	list
(529788) 2010 NS_{101}	12 July 2010	list
(529789) 2010 NW_{106}	12 July 2010	list
(529793) 2010 OO_{9}	16 July 2010	list
(529797) 2010 OA_{19}	18 July 2010	list
(529798) 2010 OM_{20}	18 July 2010	list
(529799) 2010 OD_{26}	19 July 2010	list
(529803) 2010 OU_{39}	21 July 2010	list
(529805) 2010 ON_{54}	23 July 2010	list
(529807) 2010 OS_{75}	25 July 2010	list
(529808) 2010 OB_{79}	26 July 2010	list
(529810) 2010 OO_{81}	26 July 2010	list
(529812) 2010 OV_{94}	2 February 2010	list
(529813) 2010 OU_{101}	31 January 2010	list
(529814) 2010 OK_{113}	1 February 2010	list

(529815) 2010 PG_{17}	2 February 2010	list
(529817) 2010 PN_{50}	7 August 2010	list
(529819) 2010 PM_{58}	1 August 2010	list
(529840) 2010 RY_{78}	29 May 2010	list
(529896) 2010 TP_{16}	16 July 2010	list
(529933) 2010 TO_{174}	25 July 2010	list
(529934) 2010 TP_{175}	11 June 2010	list
(529948) 2010 TM_{195}	26 July 2010	list
(530123) 2011 AL_{8}	17 January 2010	list
(530152) 2011 AQ_{68}	8 January 2010	list
(530217) 2011 BK_{105}	8 January 2010	list
(530350) 2011 EQ_{43}	20 January 2010	list
(530396) 2011 FN_{69}	9 April 2010	list
(530404) 2011 FN_{90}	19 January 2010	list
(530415) 2011 FP_{159}	11 April 2010	list
(530437) 2011 GA_{91}	14 April 2010	list
(530439) 2011 HW_{3}	25 March 2010	list
(530442) 2011 HA_{12}	20 April 2010	list
(530480) 2011 HM_{104}	2 May 2010	list
(530481) 2011 JX_{2}	28 January 2010	list
(530609) 2011 SG_{72}	14 July 2010	list
(530615) 2011 SO_{86}	13 July 2010	list
(530772) 2011 UD_{201}	7 August 2010	list
(530845) 2011 UN_{415}	15 May 2010	list
(530871) 2011 WS_{2}	7 January 2010	list

(530922) 2011 WF_{143}	17 June 2010	list
(530938) 2011 XE	16 January 2010	list
(531066) 2012 DQ_{77}	20 July 2010	list
(531290) 2012 PV_{4}	3 June 2010	list
(531298) 2012 PA_{19}	6 April 2010	list
(531302) 2012 PX_{32}	21 March 2010	list
(531323) 2012 QQ_{18}	5 June 2010	list
(531402) 2012 SK_{68}	7 July 2010	list
(531403) 2012 SL_{68}	21 January 2010	list
(531469) 2012 TR_{74}	30 April 2010	list
(531484) 2012 TY_{112}	24 January 2010	list
(531521) 2012 TE_{191}	2 August 2010	list
(531563) 2012 TP_{284}	24 January 2010	list
(531626) 2012 UD_{5}	11 February 2010	list
(531658) 2012 UH_{100}	3 May 2010	list
(531706) 2012 UE_{184}	24 May 2010	list
(531808) 2012 XR_{50}	29 June 2010	list
(531832) 2012 XP_{159}	21 July 2010	list
(531839) 2012 YH_{10}	16 June 2010	list
(531855) 2013 AP_{46}	7 July 2010	list
(531864) 2013 AR_{91}	3 June 2010	list
(531929) 2013 CQ_{41}	1 May 2010	list
(531935) 2013 CJ_{55}	30 June 2010	list
(532002) 2013 DQ_{16}	19 June 2010	list
(532042) 2013 GE_{3}	5 July 2010	list

(532102) 2013 JD_{16}	23 April 2010	list
(532103) 2013 JR_{30}	1 June 2010	list
(532115) 2013 LU_{8}	12 July 2010	list
(532199) 2013 PT_{19}	5 February 2010	list
(532207) 2013 PF_{32}	26 January 2010	list
(532214) 2013 PF_{37}	25 February 2010	list
(532332) 2013 RR_{20}	7 February 2010	list
(532405) 2013 RY_{102}	10 June 2010	list
(532430) 2013 SL	25 July 2010	list
(532439) 2013 SE_{29}	19 March 2010	list
(532477) 2013 SY_{82}	24 May 2010	list
(532480) 2013 SW_{85}	4 February 2010	list
(532496) 2013 TG_{22}	2 April 2010	list
(532504) 2013 TX_{32}	14 April 2010	list
(532508) 2013 TR_{38}	14 January 2010	list
(532549) 2013 TE_{105}	2 April 2010	list
(532583) 2013 TE_{162}	28 February 2010	list
(532675) 2013 VN_{21}	31 March 2010	list
(532677) 2013 VA_{25}	17 March 2010	list
(532700) 2013 VC_{27}	29 March 2010	list
(532743) 2013 WJ_{28}	2 April 2010	list
(532775) 2013 WQ_{63}	3 June 2010	list
(532778) 2013 WO_{66}	1 May 2010	list
(532786) 2013 WZ_{80}	28 January 2010	list
(532790) 2013 WB_{84}	29 January 2010	list

(532795) 2013 WV_{91}	16 May 2010	list
(532820) 2013 WB_{113}	2 May 2010	list
(532821) 2013 WD_{113}	6 June 2010	list
(532836) 2013 XX_{7}	23 January 2010	list
(532845) 2013 XL_{17}	15 April 2010	list
(532865) 2013 XF_{28}	28 January 2010	list
(532875) 2013 YJ_{15}	14 January 2010	list
(532887) 2013 YR_{25}	8 June 2010	list
(532900) 2013 YT_{35}	17 April 2010	list
(532901) 2013 YJ_{39}	24 June 2010	list
(532925) 2013 YC_{73}	4 March 2010	list
(532950) 2013 YL_{110}	21 June 2010	list
(532954) 2013 YP_{113}	9 February 2010	list
(532967) 2013 YN_{132}	29 April 2010	list
(533089) 2014 BX_{65}	22 June 2010	list
(533128) 2014 CH_{24}	12 May 2010	list
(533142) 2014 CY_{26}	17 February 2010	list
(533201) 2014 DW_{138}	11 April 2010	list
(533216) 2014 DL_{146}	19 May 2010	list
(533235) 2014 DB_{148}	10 June 2010	list
(533364) 2014 FJ_{76}	9 June 2010	list
(533434) 2014 GK_{64}	7 June 2010	list
(533439) 2014 HO_{1}	14 July 2010	list
(533449) 2014 HO_{14}	11 May 2010	list
(533450) 2014 HP_{15}	14 May 2010	list

(533469) 2014 HU_{51}	20 May 2010	list
(533486) 2014 HZ_{156}	12 June 2010	list
(533503) 2014 HE_{190}	23 July 2010	list
(533515) 2014 HY_{203}	14 July 2010	list
(533522) 2014 HF_{211}	6 July 2010	list
(533549) 2014 JA_{61}	17 July 2010	list
(533621) 2014 KK_{72}	8 July 2010	list
(533894) 2014 PM_{28}	10 February 2010	list
(533912) 2014 PU_{57}	15 August 2010	list
(533959) 2014 QD_{135}	17 April 2010	list
(534044) 2014 QM_{392}	26 February 2010	list
(534159) 2014 RD_{62}	11 April 2010	list
(534178) 2014 RY_{69}	27 July 2010	list
(534207) 2014 SF_{151}	29 July 2010	list
(534299) 2014 SP_{311}	16 April 2010	list
(534357) 2014 TS_{38}	13 May 2010	list
(534384) 2014 TX_{60}	22 April 2010	list
(534413) 2014 TQ_{88}	5 August 2010	list
(534463) 2014 UP_{25}	29 July 2010	list
(534546) 2014 UC_{114}	26 March 2010	list
(534561) 2014 UA_{148}	9 June 2010	list
(534676) 2014 VK_{2}	26 October 2014	list
(534773) 2014 WZ_{64}	9 June 2010	list
(534857) 2014 WM_{227}	10 July 2010	list
(534918) 2014 WW_{366}	28 January 2010	list

(534939) 2014 WN_{399}	18 April 2010	list
(535015) 2014 WW_{505}	8 January 2010	list
(535033) 2014 WN_{511}	12 April 2010	list
(535069) 2014 WS_{518}	11 June 2010	list
(535120) 2014 WX_{532}	8 February 2010	list
(535121) 2014 WY_{532}	9 March 2010	list
(535133) 2014 WK_{534}	10 May 2010	list
(535150) 2014 XB_{12}	26 March 2010	list
(535176) 2014 XA_{43}	27 January 2010	list
(535341) 2015 AH_{41}	29 July 2010	list
(535427) 2015 AH_{239}	16 January 2010	list
(535449) 2015 AE_{265}	26 March 2010	list
(535467) 2015 AT_{282}	3 March 2010	list
(535506) 2015 BX_{5}	14 June 2010	list
(535577) 2015 BR_{64}	11 May 2010	list
(535591) 2015 BV_{72}	17 January 2010	list
(535598) 2015 BD_{78}	4 April 2010	list
(535639) 2015 BE_{108}	7 April 2010	list
(535679) 2015 BB_{148}	8 March 2010	list
(535688) 2015 BX_{155}	17 February 2010	list
(535702) 2015 BE_{179}	24 May 2010	list
(535740) 2015 BW_{226}	15 January 2010	list
(535776) 2015 BD_{259}	26 May 2010	list
(535790) 2015 BC_{264}	27 March 2010	list
(535812) 2015 BW_{287}	21 June 2010	list

(535826) 2015 BH_{301}	9 February 2010	list
(535835) 2015 BH_{304}	13 January 2010	list
(535843) 2015 BT_{308}	6 June 2010	list
(535880) 2015 BM_{352}	13 May 2010	list
(535968) 2015 BM_{468}	2 April 2010	list
(536004) 2015 BO_{532}	20 January 2010	list
(536010) 2015 BF_{534}	12 May 2010	list
(536214) 2015 CF_{10}	18 April 2010	list
(536221) 2015 CW_{14}	13 March 2010	list
(536286) 2015 CX_{60}	12 March 2010	list
(536317) 2015 CQ_{69}	13 April 2010	list
(536400) 2015 DF_{99}	18 January 2010	list
(536447) 2015 DE_{133}	4 March 2010	list
(536456) 2015 DQ_{137}	20 March 2010	list
(536480) 2015 DM_{153}	10 April 2010	list
(536483) 2015 DS_{154}	8 May 2010	list
(536492) 2015 DD_{168}	9 June 2010	list
(536494) 2015 DL_{173}	22 June 2010	list
(536515) 2015 DQ_{207}	17 May 2010	list
(536529) 2015 DC_{215}	26 February 2010	list
(536536) 2015 DV_{217}	17 March 2010	list
(536537) 2015 DO_{218}	4 May 2010	list
(536538) 2015 DU_{218}	19 January 2010	list
(536540) 2015 DX_{219}	23 February 2010	list
(536581) 2015 DC_{232}	10 April 2010	list

(536639) 2015 DM_{241}	1 April 2010	list
(536681) 2015 DY_{250}	28 June 2010	list
(536683) 2015 EW_{1}	28 April 2010	list
(536697) 2015 EQ_{13}	14 July 2010	list
(536719) 2015 EW_{57}	27 February 2010	list
(536770) 2015 FF_{60}	25 February 2010	list
(536780) 2015 FH_{73}	13 February 2010	list
(536788) 2015 FP_{95}	9 February 2010	list
(536822) 2015 FV_{174}	15 May 2010	list
(536825) 2015 FD_{178}	14 March 2010	list
(536829) 2015 FD_{185}	9 April 2010	list
(536845) 2015 FS_{215}	12 January 2010	list
(536907) 2015 FY_{329}	16 June 2010	list
(536917) 2015 FJ_{340}	3 April 2010	list
(536918) 2015 FT_{341}	19 January 2010	list
(536986) 2015 FC_{404}	14 April 2010	list
(536988) 2015 FK_{404}	16 July 2010	list
(537053) 2015 GC_{8}	22 February 2010	list
(537054) 2015 GN_{8}	18 April 2010	list
(537057) 2015 GT_{13}	14 April 2010	list
(537070) 2015 GD_{26}	16 March 2010	list
(537103) 2015 GU_{51}	16 June 2010	list
(537105) 2015 GC_{52}	13 January 2010	list
(537126) 2015 HB_{11}	21 March 2010	list
(537137) 2015 HA_{46}	24 June 2010	list

(537141) 2015 HP_{60}	12 June 2010	list
(537142) 2015 HR_{60}	11 May 2010	list
(537174) 2015 HU_{123}	15 January 2010	list
(537180) 2015 HY_{144}	2 March 2010	list
(537181) 2015 HJ_{148}	16 April 2010	list
(537197) 2015 HK_{169}	28 February 2010	list
(537199) 2015 HA_{172}	12 March 2010	list
(537218) 2015 HG_{186}	8 April 2010	list
(537227) 2015 HE_{187}	3 May 2010	list
(537229) 2015 HM_{187}	9 April 2010	list
(537265) 2015 HV_{196}	4 March 2010	list
(537289) 2015 KT_{2}	13 February 2010	list
(537295) 2015 KT_{11}	26 June 2010	list
(537297) 2015 KR_{13}	14 April 2010	list
(537315) 2015 KX_{39}	27 February 2010	list
(537347) 2015 KK_{132}	27 June 2010	list
(537353) 2015 KD_{147}	3 May 2010	list
(537396) 2015 LK_{2}	30 April 2010	list
(537407) 2015 LJ_{23}	21 April 2010	list
(537451) 2015 MK_{7}	15 June 2010	list
(537463) 2015 MH_{38}	23 February 2010	list
(537465) 2015 MJ_{51}	7 July 2010	list
(537471) 2015 MJ_{59}	27 June 2010	list
(537473) 2015 MJ_{66}	24 July 2010	list
(537474) 2015 MN_{67}	25 July 2010	list

(537493) 2015 MA_{126}	22 May 2010	list
(537511) 2015 MZ_{136}	16 June 2010	list
(537512) 2015 MJ_{137}	9 June 2010	list
(537520) 2015 ML_{140}	30 March 2010	list
(537522) 2015 MV_{141}	22 February 2010	list
(537542) 2015 NQ_{28}	16 April 2010	list
(537543) 2015 NS_{28}	29 June 2010	list
(537554) 2015 OH_{44}	26 June 2010	list
(537556) 2015 OB_{64}	23 July 2010	list
(537569) 2015 OP_{85}	14 June 2010	list
(537584) 2015 OK_{97}	24 July 2010	list
(537600) 2015 PY_{40}	27 June 2010	list
(537605) 2015 PD_{58}	15 July 2010	list
(537611) 2015 PU_{242}	7 August 2010	list
(537615) 2015 PK_{293}	5 August 2010	list
(537617) 2015 PR_{309}	6 August 2010	list
(537646) 2015 RN_{38}	24 July 2010	list
(537652) 2015 RA_{101}	24 May 2010	list
(537656) 2015 RG_{121}	7 August 2010	list
(537710) 2015 TF_{156}	20 May 2010	list
(537814) 2015 XH_{180}	10 July 2010	list
(537828) 2015 XN_{370}	26 July 2010	list
(537829) 2015 XY_{378}	12 December 2015	list
(537991) 2016 AS_{224}	25 April 2010	list
(538142) 2016 BJ_{90}	14 May 2010	list

(538259) 2016 CA_{278}	26 January 2010	list
(538296) 2016 CZ_{283}	4 June 2010	list
(538367) 2016 CS_{313}	2 May 2010	list
(538420) 2016 EQ_{16}	18 January 2010	list
(538542) 2016 EW_{219}	29 April 2010	list
(538564) 2016 EE_{225}	5 May 2010	list
(538651) 2016 FQ_{7}	6 June 2010	list
(538656) 2016 FX_{11}	1 May 2010	list
(538693) 2016 FN_{62}	23 February 2010	list
(538748) 2016 GY_{24}	27 May 2010	list
(538754) 2016 GG_{35}	5 April 2010	list
(538838) 2016 GT_{207}	29 March 2010	list
(538859) 2016 GO_{255}	25 January 2010	list
(538916) 2016 HC_{5}	6 May 2010	list
(538919) 2016 HD_{8}	9 March 2010	list
(538946) 2016 JK_{13}	9 March 2010	list
(538966) 2016 JY_{34}	12 June 2010	list
(538970) 2016 JG_{40}	4 August 2010	list
(539080) 2016 NW_{12}	20 April 2010	list
(539099) 2016 NT_{48}	16 March 2010	list
(539107) 2016 NB_{64}	16 May 2010	list
(539164) 2016 NZ_{71}	6 June 2010	list
(539197) 2016 NK_{80}	15 March 2010	list
(539244) 2016 PP_{11}	21 March 2010	list
(539247) 2016 PQ_{12}	31 May 2010	list

(539273) 2016 PX_{85}	16 June 2010	list
(539399) 2016 PU_{113}	21 May 2010	list
(539419) 2016 PK_{123}	21 June 2010	list
(539451) 2016 QY_{14}	24 April 2010	list
(539494) 2016 QM_{79}	13 January 2010	list
(539584) 2016 SM_{4}	18 April 2010	list
(539588) 2016 SX_{5}	29 April 2010	list
(539609) 2016 SZ_{34}	20 March 2010	list
(539661) 2016 TQ_{12}	25 April 2010	list
(539662) 2016 TB_{16}	18 May 2010	list
(539664) 2016 TS_{25}	25 April 2010	list
(539701) 2016 TL_{98}	26 June 2010	list
(539719) 2016 UR_{29}	14 July 2010	list
(539725) 2016 UP_{38}	8 June 2010	list
(539735) 2016 UH_{63}	27 May 2010	list
(539742) 2016 UQ_{70}	12 May 2010	list
(539782) 2016 WC_{42}	21 July 2010	list
(539784) 2016 WU_{51}	8 July 2010	list
(539791) 2016 YH_{11}	24 July 2010	list
(539815) 2017 DY_{6}	23 March 2010	list
(539843) 2017 DH_{88}	31 January 2010	list
(539846) 2017 DR_{95}	26 February 2010	list
(539948) 2017 HA_{8}	8 April 2010	list
(540079) 2017 OQ_{28}	22 July 2010	list
(540138) 2017 PP_{31}	8 January 2010	list

(540159) 2017 QZ_{18}	5 June 2010	list
(540181) 2017 QF_{51}	3 February 2010	list
(540195) 2017 QZ_{63}	27 June 2010	list
(540196) 2017 QM_{64}	21 July 2010	list
(540198) 2017 QC_{67}	1 May 2010	list
(540208) 2017 RW_{18}	16 May 2010	list
(540218) 2017 RJ_{21}	16 March 2010	list
(540293) 2017 RA_{72}	11 March 2010	list
(540300) 2017 RK_{75}	13 February 2010	list
540413 Nikzad	2 February 2010	list
(540688) 2017 VO_{4}	3 March 2010	list
(540689) 2017 VS_{4}	18 April 2010	list
(540783) 2017 XA_{5}	24 February 2010	list
(540935) 2017 XK_{41}	19 July 2010	list
(541000) 2017 XP_{57}	23 April 2010	list
(541013) 2017 YQ_{2}	20 March 2010	list
(541017) 2017 YX_{7}	22 February 2010	list
(541018) 2017 YY_{7}	16 May 2010	list
(541038) 2018 BW_{8}	25 July 2010	list
(541052) 2018 CS_{5}	23 June 2010	list
(541061) 2018 CK_{11}	29 June 2010	list
(541062) 2018 CL_{11}	12 April 2010	list
(541068) 2018 NP	30 March 2010	list
(541103) 2018 RH_{11}	4 June 2010	list
(541108) 2018 RH_{14}	17 May 2010	list

(541110) 2018 RN_{14}	10 April 2010	list
(541388) 2011 GX_{54}	26 February 2010	list
(541456) 2011 JK_{23}	16 May 2010	list
(541465) 2011 KJ_{43}	14 April 2010	list
(542646) 2013 GJ_{60}	20 April 2010	list
(542816) 2013 JD_{53}	30 July 2010	list
(543737) 2014 OP_{399}	10 July 2010	list
(544011) 2014 QZ_{491}	17 July 2010	list
(545580) 2011 QT_{97}	2 April 2010	list
(545681) 2011 SY_{189}	28 March 2010	list
(545961) 2011 UV_{420}	9 May 2010	list
(546039) 2011 WJ_{158}	15 July 2010	list
(546585) 2010 VM_{246}	8 January 2010	list
(547240) 2010 GB_{77}	10 April 2010	list
(547242) 2010 GR_{89}	13 April 2010	list
(547358) 2010 NM_{35}	8 July 2010	list
(547360) 2010 NK_{113}	13 July 2010	list
(547717) 2010 VD_{37}	1 August 2010	list
(548498) 2010 NL_{2}	9 July 2010	list
(552705) 2010 NO_{71}	14 July 2010	list
(552706) 2010 NH_{77}	15 July 2010	list
(555288) 2013 UW_{28}	13 April 2010	list
(556505) 2014 QN_{22}	11 July 2010	list
(558004) 2014 WU_{467}	11 July 2010	list
(558123) 2014 WA_{586}	9 May 2010	list

(560422) 2015 FF_{352}	17 June 2010	list
(564709) 2016 LS_{19}	20 January 2010	list
(564845) 2016 RB_{5}	17 April 2010	list
(568049) 2003 KM_{37}	2 July 2010	list
(574307) 2010 HD_{5}	16 April 2010	list
(575489) 2011 SH_{328}	9 April 2010	list
(575948) 2011 YX_{82}	25 May 2010	list
(578228) 2013 YF_{60}	15 April 2010	list
(578603) 2014 DH_{179}	7 May 2010	list
(582129) 2015 PZ_{23}	16 July 2010	list
(582204) 2015 PF_{222}	17 July 2010	list
(582216) 2015 PU_{300}	21 July 2010	list
(583504) 2016 GO_{298}	3 April 2010	list
(585947) 2021 GB_{71}	26 May 2010	list
(586067) 2001 AR_{54}	24 July 2010	list
(589660) 2010 NZ_{45}	9 July 2010	list
(589665) 2010 OU_{8}	16 July 2010	list
(591317) 2013 HM_{12}	9 July 2010	list
(593496) 2015 PB_{231}	9 July 2010	list
(595927) 2004 QC_{31}	12 July 2010	list
(599573) 2010 NL_{32}	7 July 2010	list
(599574) 2010 NF_{48}	9 July 2010	list
(599575) 2010 NL_{58}	10 July 2010	list
(600846) 2012 PQ_{55}	24 June 2010	list
(602400) 2014 JS_{15}	2 May 2014	list

(607519) 2001 KG_{85}	22 July 2010	list
(611562) 2006 YV_{59}	25 May 2010	list
(614599) 2010 AB78	12 January 2010	list
(614600) 2010 BO_{6}	16 January 2010	list
(614601) 2010 BC_{50}	20 January 2010	list
(614602) 2010 BC_{106}	25 January 2010	list
(614604) 2010 CB_{8}	7 February 2010	list
(614607) 2010 CY_{57}	11 February 2010	list
(614620) 2010 CW_{225}	8 February 2010	list
(614621) 2010 DZ_{19}	17 February 2010	list
(614622) 2010 DH_{59}	24 February 2010	list
(614623) 2010 DD_{70}	28 February 2010	list
(614641) 2010 GV_{21}	1 April 2010	list
(614643) 2010 GH_{65}	10 April 2010	list
(614648) 2010 HS_{90}	29 April 2010	list
(614649) 2010 JP_{7}	1 May 2010	list
(614655) 2010 JR_{93}	10 May 2010	list
(614657) 2010 JW_{127}	13 May 2010	list
(614658) 2010 JL_{133}	14 May 2010	list
(614663) 2010 KO_{118}	30 May 2010	list
(614664) 2010 LC_{17}	2 June 2010	list
(614665) 2010 LT_{93}	12 June 2010	list
(614666) 2010 LO_{101}	13 June 2010	list
(614667) 2010 LB_{125}	15 June 2010	list
(614668) 2010 MR_{5}	21 June 2010	list

(614669) 2010 MZ_{24}	18 June 2010	list
(614670) 2010 MB_{115}	30 June 2010	list
(614671) 2010 NU_{37}	8 July 2010	list
(614672) 2010 ND_{40}	8 July 2010	list
(614674) 2010 OW	17 July 2010	list
(614675) 2010 OE_{117}	30 July 2010	list
(620091) 2015 FD_{341}	27 March 2015	list
(647168) 2008 RA_{152}	8 April 2010	list
(648797) 2010 GH_{91}	13 April 2010	list
(648859) 2010 NL_{63}	11 July 2010	list
(648861) 2010 NG_{105}	12 July 2010	list
(648862) 2010 NH_{116}	14 July 2010	list
(653443) 2014 PQ_{40}	13 July 2010	list
(655254) 2015 HG_{165}	12 April 2010	list
(657994) 2017 EN_{6}	1 March 2017	list
(666405) 2010 GZ_{183}	8 April 2010	list
(666408) 2010 GL_{199}	8 April 2010	list
(666488) 2010 NL_{112}	13 July 2010	list
(666495) 2010 OB_{14}	17 July 2010	list
(666514) 2010 PS_{86}	4 August 2010	list
(666517) 2010 PV_{92}	4 August 2010	list
(666711) 2010 TX_{110}	11 July 2010	list
(669088) 2012 SH_{80}	9 February 2010	list
(671527) 2014 MQ_{69}	15 April 2010	list
(674943) 2015 TT_{144}	7 October 2015	list

(675755) 2016 AJ_{93}	20 March 2010	list
(678263) 2017 QP_{17}	20 August 2017	list
(679542) 2019 NT_{3}	18 April 2010	list
(686067) 2010 OE_{10}	16 July 2010	list
(686068) 2010 OS_{11}	17 July 2010	list
(693907) 2015 OS_{77}	9 July 2010	list
(706563) 2010 HR_{3}	16 April 2010	list
(706568) 2010 HV_{112}	20 April 2010	list
(706765) 2010 TK7	1 October 2010	list
(709210) 2012 VD_{124}	19 April 2010	list
(709268) 2012 XA_{52}	15 April 2010	list
(711406) 2014 OF_{122}	7 July 2010	list
(711826) 2014 QB_{283}	9 July 2010	list
(712651) 2014 VY_{30}	13 April 2010	list
(712911) 2014 WR_{348}	17 April 2010	list
(714841) 2015 RE_{24}	16 July 2010	list

== See also ==
- List of minor planet discoverers § WISE
- List of minor planets
- Minor Planet Center
