= List of minor planets: 538001–539000 =

The following is a partial list of minor planets, running from minor-planet number 538001 through 539000, inclusive. The primary data for this and other partial lists is based on JPL's "Small-Body Orbital Elements" and data available from the Minor Planet Center. Critical list information is also provided by the MPC, unless otherwise specified from Lowell Observatory. A detailed description of the table's columns and additional sources are given on the main page including a complete list of every page in this series, and a statistical break-up on the dynamical classification of minor planets.

Also see the summary list of all named bodies in numerical and alphabetical order, and the corresponding naming citations for the number range of this particular list. New namings may only be added to this list after official publication, as the preannouncement of names is condemned by the Working Group for Small Bodies Nomenclature of the International Astronomical Union.

Near-Earth obj.	MBA (inner)	MBA (outer)	Centaur
Mars-crosser	MBA (middle)	Jupiter trojan	Trans-Neptunian obj.
Unclassified

== 538001–538100 ==
Designation			Discovery			Properties		Ref
Permanent	Provisional	Named after	Date	Site	Discoverer(s)	Category	Diam.	Ref
538001	2016 AW_{231}	—	January 7, 2016	Haleakala	Pan-STARRS 1	MAR	860 m	MPC · JPL
538002	2016 AZ_{231}	—	July 29, 2014	Haleakala	Pan-STARRS 1	·	620 m	MPC · JPL
538003	2016 AC_{232}	—	May 4, 2009	Mount Lemmon	Mount Lemmon Survey	·	1.0 km	MPC · JPL
538004	2016 AE_{232}	—	August 17, 2013	Haleakala	Pan-STARRS 1	·	2.0 km	MPC · JPL
538005	2016 AN_{232}	—	October 12, 2009	Mount Lemmon	Mount Lemmon Survey	·	2.5 km	MPC · JPL
538006	2016 AP_{233}	—	August 21, 2004	Siding Spring	SSS	EUN	2.1 km	MPC · JPL
538007	2016 AU_{234}	—	November 16, 2010	Mount Lemmon	Mount Lemmon Survey	·	1.4 km	MPC · JPL
538008	2016 AM_{235}	—	May 1, 2009	Mount Lemmon	Mount Lemmon Survey	·	1.2 km	MPC · JPL
538009	2016 AR_{235}	—	October 22, 2003	Kitt Peak	Spacewatch	·	1.3 km	MPC · JPL
538010	2016 AA_{236}	—	January 3, 2016	Haleakala	Pan-STARRS 1	·	620 m	MPC · JPL
538011	2016 AM_{236}	—	February 3, 2009	Kitt Peak	Spacewatch	·	870 m	MPC · JPL
538012	2016 AT_{236}	—	February 1, 2009	Kitt Peak	Spacewatch	·	700 m	MPC · JPL
538013	2016 AC_{237}	—	December 27, 2011	Mount Lemmon	Mount Lemmon Survey	·	1.1 km	MPC · JPL
538014	2016 AE_{237}	—	October 20, 2006	Mount Lemmon	Mount Lemmon Survey	·	1.3 km	MPC · JPL
538015	2016 AH_{237}	—	November 18, 2003	Kitt Peak	Spacewatch	·	2.2 km	MPC · JPL
538016	2016 AJ_{237}	—	October 20, 2003	Kitt Peak	Spacewatch	EOS	2.0 km	MPC · JPL
538017	2016 AO_{237}	—	January 8, 2016	Haleakala	Pan-STARRS 1	·	680 m	MPC · JPL
538018	2016 AF_{238}	—	March 30, 2012	Siding Spring	SSS	·	2.4 km	MPC · JPL
538019	2016 AG_{238}	—	September 24, 2008	Mount Lemmon	Mount Lemmon Survey	·	2.5 km	MPC · JPL
538020	2016 AR_{239}	—	August 31, 2014	Haleakala	Pan-STARRS 1	·	1.1 km	MPC · JPL
538021	2016 AF_{240}	—	September 4, 2011	Haleakala	Pan-STARRS 1	·	600 m	MPC · JPL
538022	2016 AH_{240}	—	February 14, 2012	Haleakala	Pan-STARRS 1	·	1.6 km	MPC · JPL
538023	2016 AU_{240}	—	November 22, 2011	Mount Lemmon	Mount Lemmon Survey	·	780 m	MPC · JPL
538024	2016 AZ_{240}	—	July 30, 2014	Haleakala	Pan-STARRS 1	V	540 m	MPC · JPL
538025	2016 AC_{241}	—	November 23, 2008	Kitt Peak	Spacewatch	V	530 m	MPC · JPL
538026	2016 AH_{243}	—	February 2, 2005	Kitt Peak	Spacewatch	·	1.2 km	MPC · JPL
538027	2016 AR_{243}	—	February 5, 2009	Kitt Peak	Spacewatch	·	660 m	MPC · JPL
538028	2016 AN_{244}	—	April 10, 2013	Haleakala	Pan-STARRS 1	·	720 m	MPC · JPL
538029	2016 AA_{245}	—	January 3, 2016	Haleakala	Pan-STARRS 1	·	1.6 km	MPC · JPL
538030	2016 AY_{246}	—	November 22, 2014	Haleakala	Pan-STARRS 1	MAR	1.1 km	MPC · JPL
538031	2016 AR_{247}	—	July 28, 2014	Haleakala	Pan-STARRS 1	·	620 m	MPC · JPL
538032	2016 AA_{250}	—	January 4, 2016	Haleakala	Pan-STARRS 1	·	1.4 km	MPC · JPL
538033	2016 AD_{250}	—	January 1, 2009	Kitt Peak	Spacewatch	V	520 m	MPC · JPL
538034	2016 AM_{250}	—	June 18, 2013	Haleakala	Pan-STARRS 1	·	1.3 km	MPC · JPL
538035	2016 AQ_{250}	—	January 20, 2012	Haleakala	Pan-STARRS 1	·	1.8 km	MPC · JPL
538036	2016 AS_{251}	—	March 16, 2013	Kitt Peak	Spacewatch	·	630 m	MPC · JPL
538037	2016 AQ_{252}	—	September 30, 2005	Catalina	CSS	·	1.7 km	MPC · JPL
538038	2016 AT_{252}	—	March 25, 2012	Mount Lemmon	Mount Lemmon Survey	MAR	830 m	MPC · JPL
538039	2016 AA_{253}	—	July 7, 2013	Siding Spring	SSS	·	1.8 km	MPC · JPL
538040	2016 AN_{253}	—	November 4, 2010	Mount Lemmon	Mount Lemmon Survey	·	1.3 km	MPC · JPL
538041	2016 AW_{254}	—	September 27, 2011	Mount Lemmon	Mount Lemmon Survey	·	570 m	MPC · JPL
538042	2016 AU_{258}	—	January 1, 2012	Mount Lemmon	Mount Lemmon Survey	·	1.2 km	MPC · JPL
538043	2016 AY_{258}	—	November 6, 2010	Kitt Peak	Spacewatch	·	1.1 km	MPC · JPL
538044	2016 AG_{259}	—	January 16, 2008	Mount Lemmon	Mount Lemmon Survey	EUN	1.3 km	MPC · JPL
538045	2016 AV_{261}	—	January 14, 2012	Mount Lemmon	Mount Lemmon Survey	·	1.1 km	MPC · JPL
538046	2016 AY_{261}	—	July 13, 2013	Haleakala	Pan-STARRS 1	·	1.2 km	MPC · JPL
538047	2016 AK_{262}	—	September 2, 2014	Haleakala	Pan-STARRS 1	·	790 m	MPC · JPL
538048	2016 AR_{262}	—	November 1, 2010	Mount Lemmon	Mount Lemmon Survey	·	1.1 km	MPC · JPL
538049	2016 AJ_{263}	—	July 14, 2013	Haleakala	Pan-STARRS 1	EUN	1 km	MPC · JPL
538050	2016 AL_{263}	—	November 27, 2014	Haleakala	Pan-STARRS 1	·	1.3 km	MPC · JPL
538051	2016 AN_{263}	—	November 1, 2010	Mount Lemmon	Mount Lemmon Survey	KON	2.0 km	MPC · JPL
538052	2016 AU_{263}	—	March 16, 2012	Haleakala	Pan-STARRS 1	·	1.3 km	MPC · JPL
538053	2016 AZ_{264}	—	August 19, 2014	Haleakala	Pan-STARRS 1	·	1.3 km	MPC · JPL
538054	2016 AG_{265}	—	September 16, 2009	Kitt Peak	Spacewatch	·	2.1 km	MPC · JPL
538055	2016 AL_{265}	—	April 30, 2006	Kitt Peak	Spacewatch	·	670 m	MPC · JPL
538056	2016 AP_{265}	—	January 9, 2016	Haleakala	Pan-STARRS 1	·	1.4 km	MPC · JPL
538057	2016 AY_{265}	—	November 6, 2008	Kitt Peak	Spacewatch	·	2.9 km	MPC · JPL
538058	2016 AZ_{265}	—	November 21, 2008	Kitt Peak	Spacewatch	URS	3.4 km	MPC · JPL
538059	2016 AG_{266}	—	January 11, 2011	Mount Lemmon	Mount Lemmon Survey	·	1.7 km	MPC · JPL
538060	2016 AP_{266}	—	November 1, 2013	Kitt Peak	Spacewatch	·	3.1 km	MPC · JPL
538061	2016 AW_{266}	—	October 26, 2008	Kitt Peak	Spacewatch	·	4.1 km	MPC · JPL
538062	2016 AX_{266}	—	October 3, 2013	Catalina	CSS	BRA	2.0 km	MPC · JPL
538063	2016 AU_{268}	—	January 20, 2012	Haleakala	Pan-STARRS 1	·	2.0 km	MPC · JPL
538064	2016 AE_{269}	—	October 17, 2010	Catalina	CSS	MAR	850 m	MPC · JPL
538065	2016 AM_{269}	—	March 13, 2012	Mount Lemmon	Mount Lemmon Survey	MAR	870 m	MPC · JPL
538066	2016 AU_{269}	—	January 12, 2016	Haleakala	Pan-STARRS 1	·	1.7 km	MPC · JPL
538067	2016 AN_{270}	—	October 22, 2011	Kitt Peak	Spacewatch	V	420 m	MPC · JPL
538068	2016 AU_{270}	—	October 26, 2011	Haleakala	Pan-STARRS 1	·	630 m	MPC · JPL
538069	2016 AD_{271}	—	January 13, 2016	Haleakala	Pan-STARRS 1	ADE	1.7 km	MPC · JPL
538070	2016 AJ_{271}	—	August 28, 2014	Haleakala	Pan-STARRS 1	·	780 m	MPC · JPL
538071	2016 AA_{272}	—	December 29, 2011	Mount Lemmon	Mount Lemmon Survey	V	590 m	MPC · JPL
538072	2016 AB_{272}	—	March 16, 2012	Mount Lemmon	Mount Lemmon Survey	·	980 m	MPC · JPL
538073	2016 AU_{272}	—	April 13, 2013	Haleakala	Pan-STARRS 1	·	1.1 km	MPC · JPL
538074	2016 AX_{272}	—	February 8, 2008	Mount Lemmon	Mount Lemmon Survey	EUN	1.2 km	MPC · JPL
538075	2016 AY_{273}	—	November 22, 2014	Haleakala	Pan-STARRS 1	·	1.2 km	MPC · JPL
538076	2016 AJ_{274}	—	January 17, 2011	Mount Lemmon	Mount Lemmon Survey	·	1.7 km	MPC · JPL
538077	2016 AK_{274}	—	January 7, 2010	Kitt Peak	Spacewatch	·	2.8 km	MPC · JPL
538078	2016 AQ_{274}	—	November 17, 2014	Haleakala	Pan-STARRS 1	V	700 m	MPC · JPL
538079	2016 AX_{274}	—	February 23, 2012	Mount Lemmon	Mount Lemmon Survey	·	1.0 km	MPC · JPL
538080	2016 AR_{276}	—	November 13, 2010	Kitt Peak	Spacewatch	HNS	1.3 km	MPC · JPL
538081	2016 AE_{277}	—	January 1, 2008	Kitt Peak	Spacewatch	·	1.2 km	MPC · JPL
538082	2016 AE_{278}	—	January 9, 2016	Haleakala	Pan-STARRS 1	·	940 m	MPC · JPL
538083	2016 AK_{278}	—	January 9, 2016	Haleakala	Pan-STARRS 1	H	440 m	MPC · JPL
538084	2016 BK	—	March 28, 2011	Catalina	CSS	H	640 m	MPC · JPL
538085	2016 BO_{1}	—	January 18, 2016	Haleakala	Pan-STARRS 1	APO +1km	1.1 km	MPC · JPL
538086	2016 BW_{1}	—	February 12, 1999	Socorro	LINEAR	PHO	1.1 km	MPC · JPL
538087	2016 BB_{2}	—	September 22, 2008	Kitt Peak	Spacewatch	·	3.3 km	MPC · JPL
538088	2016 BM_{7}	—	November 30, 2005	Kitt Peak	Spacewatch	·	1.9 km	MPC · JPL
538089	2016 BF_{8}	—	November 25, 2011	Haleakala	Pan-STARRS 1	·	870 m	MPC · JPL
538090	2016 BJ_{11}	—	January 8, 2016	Haleakala	Pan-STARRS 1	·	1.5 km	MPC · JPL
538091	2016 BL_{11}	—	March 31, 2012	Mount Lemmon	Mount Lemmon Survey	HNS	880 m	MPC · JPL
538092	2016 BJ_{14}	—	December 22, 2012	Haleakala	Pan-STARRS 1	H	540 m	MPC · JPL
538093	2016 BL_{16}	—	January 17, 2009	Kitt Peak	Spacewatch	·	880 m	MPC · JPL
538094	2016 BU_{16}	—	May 26, 2006	Kitt Peak	Spacewatch	V	590 m	MPC · JPL
538095	2016 BH_{17}	—	November 20, 2008	Mount Lemmon	Mount Lemmon Survey	·	700 m	MPC · JPL
538096	2016 BW_{17}	—	January 7, 2006	Mount Lemmon	Mount Lemmon Survey	·	720 m	MPC · JPL
538097	2016 BP_{22}	—	January 10, 2007	Mount Lemmon	Mount Lemmon Survey	·	2.0 km	MPC · JPL
538098	2016 BT_{28}	—	September 25, 2011	Haleakala	Pan-STARRS 1	·	600 m	MPC · JPL
538099	2016 BY_{31}	—	August 23, 2014	Haleakala	Pan-STARRS 1	·	1.3 km	MPC · JPL
538100	2016 BC_{32}	—	October 20, 2011	Kitt Peak	Spacewatch	·	770 m	MPC · JPL

== 538101–538200 ==
back to top

Designation			Discovery			Properties		Ref
Permanent	Provisional	Named after	Date	Site	Discoverer(s)	Category	Diam.	Ref
538101	2016 BH_{35}	—	April 13, 2013	Haleakala	Pan-STARRS 1	·	610 m	MPC · JPL
538102	2016 BK_{35}	—	January 11, 2008	Kitt Peak	Spacewatch	H	430 m	MPC · JPL
538103	2016 BR_{35}	—	December 31, 2011	Kitt Peak	Spacewatch	·	1.3 km	MPC · JPL
538104	2016 BL_{36}	—	January 14, 2016	Haleakala	Pan-STARRS 1	·	680 m	MPC · JPL
538105	2016 BG_{38}	—	February 13, 2008	Kitt Peak	Spacewatch	MAR	870 m	MPC · JPL
538106	2016 BL_{40}	—	November 15, 2011	Mount Lemmon	Mount Lemmon Survey	·	630 m	MPC · JPL
538107	2016 BF_{44}	—	March 24, 2006	Kitt Peak	Spacewatch	·	620 m	MPC · JPL
538108	2016 BR_{44}	—	September 13, 2007	Kitt Peak	Spacewatch	·	980 m	MPC · JPL
538109	2016 BR_{45}	—	July 7, 2014	Haleakala	Pan-STARRS 1	·	1.1 km	MPC · JPL
538110	2016 BG_{48}	—	October 23, 2011	Mount Lemmon	Mount Lemmon Survey	·	600 m	MPC · JPL
538111	2016 BZ_{48}	—	November 2, 2007	Kitt Peak	Spacewatch	·	1.1 km	MPC · JPL
538112	2016 BC_{51}	—	February 3, 2009	Mount Lemmon	Mount Lemmon Survey	·	1.0 km	MPC · JPL
538113	2016 BS_{51}	—	February 13, 2012	Haleakala	Pan-STARRS 1	MAR	1 km	MPC · JPL
538114	2016 BU_{51}	—	November 24, 2011	Mount Lemmon	Mount Lemmon Survey	V	750 m	MPC · JPL
538115	2016 BH_{56}	—	April 7, 2014	Mount Lemmon	Mount Lemmon Survey	H	490 m	MPC · JPL
538116	2016 BD_{59}	—	December 9, 2004	Kitt Peak	Spacewatch	·	840 m	MPC · JPL
538117	2016 BV_{60}	—	January 10, 2008	Mount Lemmon	Mount Lemmon Survey	·	1.1 km	MPC · JPL
538118	2016 BL_{61}	—	December 20, 2004	Mount Lemmon	Mount Lemmon Survey	MAS	600 m	MPC · JPL
538119	2016 BR_{61}	—	December 19, 2004	Mount Lemmon	Mount Lemmon Survey	·	1.5 km	MPC · JPL
538120	2016 BP_{62}	—	November 22, 2008	Kitt Peak	Spacewatch	·	650 m	MPC · JPL
538121	2016 BJ_{66}	—	October 24, 2011	Haleakala	Pan-STARRS 1	·	890 m	MPC · JPL
538122	2016 BQ_{73}	—	February 19, 2009	Kitt Peak	Spacewatch	·	900 m	MPC · JPL
538123	2016 BB_{80}	—	February 25, 2006	Kitt Peak	Spacewatch	·	540 m	MPC · JPL
538124	2016 BA_{82}	—	February 11, 2011	Catalina	CSS	H	530 m	MPC · JPL
538125	2016 BL_{83}	—	September 18, 2003	Kitt Peak	Spacewatch	H	560 m	MPC · JPL
538126	2016 BK_{85}	—	March 29, 2007	Kitt Peak	Spacewatch	·	2.1 km	MPC · JPL
538127	2016 BU_{87}	—	May 24, 2001	Kitt Peak	Spacewatch	·	2.3 km	MPC · JPL
538128	2016 BV_{87}	—	August 22, 2014	Haleakala	Pan-STARRS 1	·	1.2 km	MPC · JPL
538129	2016 BW_{87}	—	October 12, 2014	Mount Lemmon	Mount Lemmon Survey	·	910 m	MPC · JPL
538130	2016 BG_{88}	—	March 29, 2008	Kitt Peak	Spacewatch	·	1.5 km	MPC · JPL
538131	2016 BJ_{88}	—	May 21, 2012	Haleakala	Pan-STARRS 1	·	1.7 km	MPC · JPL
538132	2016 BL_{88}	—	March 27, 2012	Kitt Peak	Spacewatch	·	1.6 km	MPC · JPL
538133	2016 BN_{88}	—	January 4, 2012	Mount Lemmon	Mount Lemmon Survey	NYS	1.0 km	MPC · JPL
538134	2016 BX_{88}	—	November 22, 2011	Mount Lemmon	Mount Lemmon Survey	·	1.2 km	MPC · JPL
538135	2016 BA_{89}	—	December 15, 2014	Mount Lemmon	Mount Lemmon Survey	·	2.1 km	MPC · JPL
538136	2016 BB_{89}	—	October 25, 2011	Haleakala	Pan-STARRS 1	·	580 m	MPC · JPL
538137	2016 BC_{89}	—	December 22, 2005	Kitt Peak	Spacewatch	HOF	3.1 km	MPC · JPL
538138	2016 BE_{89}	—	November 16, 2011	Mount Lemmon	Mount Lemmon Survey	V	480 m	MPC · JPL
538139	2016 BO_{89}	—	February 10, 2007	Mount Lemmon	Mount Lemmon Survey	·	1.9 km	MPC · JPL
538140	2016 BT_{89}	—	November 27, 2014	Mount Lemmon	Mount Lemmon Survey	MAR	880 m	MPC · JPL
538141	2016 BU_{89}	—	February 9, 2011	Mount Lemmon	Mount Lemmon Survey	WIT	940 m	MPC · JPL
538142	2016 BJ_{90}	—	May 14, 2010	WISE	WISE	·	3.4 km	MPC · JPL
538143	2016 BK_{90}	—	December 29, 2005	Kitt Peak	Spacewatch	GEF	1.2 km	MPC · JPL
538144	2016 BO_{90}	—	January 26, 2011	Kitt Peak	Spacewatch	·	1.5 km	MPC · JPL
538145	2016 BP_{90}	—	September 30, 1995	Kitt Peak	Spacewatch	·	1.7 km	MPC · JPL
538146	2016 BS_{90}	—	September 1, 2013	Haleakala	Pan-STARRS 1	AGN	980 m	MPC · JPL
538147	2016 BT_{90}	—	October 27, 2008	Mount Lemmon	Mount Lemmon Survey	·	5.6 km	MPC · JPL
538148	2016 BX_{90}	—	March 6, 2008	Mount Lemmon	Mount Lemmon Survey	·	1.4 km	MPC · JPL
538149	2016 BZ_{90}	—	January 21, 2012	Kitt Peak	Spacewatch	·	990 m	MPC · JPL
538150	2016 BT_{91}	—	November 18, 2007	Mount Lemmon	Mount Lemmon Survey	·	1.3 km	MPC · JPL
538151	2016 BR_{92}	—	January 2, 2009	Mount Lemmon	Mount Lemmon Survey	·	650 m	MPC · JPL
538152	2016 BT_{92}	—	August 16, 2009	Catalina	CSS	·	2.0 km	MPC · JPL
538153	2016 BB_{93}	—	February 20, 2009	Mount Lemmon	Mount Lemmon Survey	·	740 m	MPC · JPL
538154	2016 BF_{93}	—	April 12, 2000	Kitt Peak	Spacewatch	·	1.1 km	MPC · JPL
538155	2016 BH_{93}	—	April 16, 2005	Kitt Peak	Spacewatch	·	1.2 km	MPC · JPL
538156	2016 BQ_{93}	—	September 25, 2014	Mount Lemmon	Mount Lemmon Survey	·	1.3 km	MPC · JPL
538157	2016 BR_{93}	—	April 1, 2009	Kitt Peak	Spacewatch	V	630 m	MPC · JPL
538158	2016 BV_{93}	—	January 17, 2016	Haleakala	Pan-STARRS 1	(16286)	1.9 km	MPC · JPL
538159	2016 BZ_{93}	—	March 17, 2012	Catalina	CSS	·	1.7 km	MPC · JPL
538160	2016 BA_{94}	—	January 30, 2012	Mount Lemmon	Mount Lemmon Survey	·	1.1 km	MPC · JPL
538161	2016 BB_{96}	—	January 16, 2016	Haleakala	Pan-STARRS 1	·	1.3 km	MPC · JPL
538162	2016 BL_{97}	—	January 17, 2016	Haleakala	Pan-STARRS 1	·	660 m	MPC · JPL
538163	2016 BG_{98}	—	February 10, 2008	Kitt Peak	Spacewatch	·	1.0 km	MPC · JPL
538164	2016 BN_{98}	—	January 30, 2011	Mount Lemmon	Mount Lemmon Survey	WIT	1.0 km	MPC · JPL
538165	2016 BT_{98}	—	March 17, 2012	Kitt Peak	Spacewatch	HNS	1.0 km	MPC · JPL
538166	2016 BY_{98}	—	December 29, 2014	Haleakala	Pan-STARRS 1	EOS	1.9 km	MPC · JPL
538167	2016 BZ_{98}	—	March 27, 2012	Kitt Peak	Spacewatch	ADE	1.5 km	MPC · JPL
538168	2016 BF_{99}	—	April 13, 2011	Mount Lemmon	Mount Lemmon Survey	EOS	2.0 km	MPC · JPL
538169	2016 BY_{99}	—	July 14, 2013	Haleakala	Pan-STARRS 1	·	2.3 km	MPC · JPL
538170	2016 BM_{100}	—	December 9, 2010	Mount Lemmon	Mount Lemmon Survey	·	1.5 km	MPC · JPL
538171	2016 BN_{100}	—	September 10, 2013	Haleakala	Pan-STARRS 1	EUN	1.1 km	MPC · JPL
538172	2016 BT_{100}	—	January 17, 2015	Haleakala	Pan-STARRS 1	·	1.4 km	MPC · JPL
538173	2016 BY_{100}	—	November 3, 2014	Mount Lemmon	Mount Lemmon Survey	·	2.9 km	MPC · JPL
538174	2016 BP_{101}	—	February 16, 2012	Haleakala	Pan-STARRS 1	·	1 km	MPC · JPL
538175	2016 BA_{102}	—	March 30, 2012	Mount Lemmon	Mount Lemmon Survey	·	1 km	MPC · JPL
538176	2016 BD_{102}	—	February 3, 2012	Haleakala	Pan-STARRS 1	·	880 m	MPC · JPL
538177	2016 BV_{102}	—	September 2, 2014	Haleakala	Pan-STARRS 1	·	1.2 km	MPC · JPL
538178	2016 BZ_{102}	—	April 1, 2009	Kitt Peak	Spacewatch	V	670 m	MPC · JPL
538179	2016 BD_{103}	—	January 29, 2016	Mount Lemmon	Mount Lemmon Survey	·	1.9 km	MPC · JPL
538180	2016 CR_{9}	—	February 27, 2009	Kitt Peak	Spacewatch	·	850 m	MPC · JPL
538181	2016 CS_{9}	—	February 26, 2009	Catalina	CSS	·	790 m	MPC · JPL
538182	2016 CY_{9}	—	January 31, 2009	Mount Lemmon	Mount Lemmon Survey	·	700 m	MPC · JPL
538183	2016 CK_{12}	—	January 5, 2006	Mount Lemmon	Mount Lemmon Survey	·	530 m	MPC · JPL
538184	2016 CN_{12}	—	March 15, 2012	Catalina	CSS	(194)	1.8 km	MPC · JPL
538185	2016 CV_{13}	—	March 10, 2005	Mount Lemmon	Mount Lemmon Survey	NYS	1.1 km	MPC · JPL
538186	2016 CD_{14}	—	August 30, 2014	Kitt Peak	Spacewatch	·	1.1 km	MPC · JPL
538187	2016 CE_{14}	—	March 17, 2005	Kitt Peak	Spacewatch	NYS	1.1 km	MPC · JPL
538188	2016 CQ_{16}	—	November 1, 2010	Mount Lemmon	Mount Lemmon Survey	·	960 m	MPC · JPL
538189	2016 CW_{18}	—	December 16, 2006	Mount Lemmon	Mount Lemmon Survey	·	2.5 km	MPC · JPL
538190	2016 CD_{22}	—	April 13, 2013	Haleakala	Pan-STARRS 1	·	670 m	MPC · JPL
538191	2016 CY_{23}	—	September 19, 2006	Catalina	CSS	·	1.6 km	MPC · JPL
538192	2016 CU_{24}	—	February 1, 2006	Kitt Peak	Spacewatch	EOS	2.0 km	MPC · JPL
538193	2016 CC_{26}	—	March 3, 2005	Kitt Peak	Spacewatch	PHO	1.1 km	MPC · JPL
538194	2016 CA_{33}	—	December 22, 2012	Haleakala	Pan-STARRS 1	H	560 m	MPC · JPL
538195	2016 CO_{35}	—	June 28, 2014	Haleakala	Pan-STARRS 1	·	750 m	MPC · JPL
538196	2016 CU_{39}	—	August 3, 2014	Haleakala	Pan-STARRS 1	·	550 m	MPC · JPL
538197	2016 CM_{42}	—	September 20, 2009	Kitt Peak	Spacewatch	·	1.8 km	MPC · JPL
538198	2016 CT_{45}	—	February 14, 2013	Haleakala	Pan-STARRS 1	·	750 m	MPC · JPL
538199	2016 CK_{46}	—	December 29, 2008	Kitt Peak	Spacewatch	·	530 m	MPC · JPL
538200	2016 CP_{48}	—	January 30, 2009	Mount Lemmon	Mount Lemmon Survey	V	440 m	MPC · JPL

== 538201–538300 ==
back to top

Designation			Discovery			Properties		Ref
Permanent	Provisional	Named after	Date	Site	Discoverer(s)	Category	Diam.	Ref
538201	2016 CC_{52}	—	February 2, 2009	Kitt Peak	Spacewatch	·	660 m	MPC · JPL
538202	2016 CO_{58}	—	October 18, 2007	Kitt Peak	Spacewatch	·	800 m	MPC · JPL
538203	2016 CH_{70}	—	October 20, 2011	Kitt Peak	Spacewatch	·	630 m	MPC · JPL
538204	2016 CG_{72}	—	September 12, 2005	Kitt Peak	Spacewatch	·	2.0 km	MPC · JPL
538205	2016 CC_{73}	—	December 31, 2008	Mount Lemmon	Mount Lemmon Survey	·	520 m	MPC · JPL
538206	2016 CB_{78}	—	December 27, 2011	Mount Lemmon	Mount Lemmon Survey	·	1.5 km	MPC · JPL
538207	2016 CX_{92}	—	June 27, 2014	Haleakala	Pan-STARRS 1	H	470 m	MPC · JPL
538208	2016 CW_{97}	—	July 10, 2005	Kitt Peak	Spacewatch	·	1.2 km	MPC · JPL
538209	2016 CC_{106}	—	May 8, 2006	Mount Lemmon	Mount Lemmon Survey	·	900 m	MPC · JPL
538210	2016 CB_{122}	—	August 22, 2014	Haleakala	Pan-STARRS 1	·	670 m	MPC · JPL
538211	2016 CV_{124}	—	June 18, 2013	Haleakala	Pan-STARRS 1	·	1.7 km	MPC · JPL
538212	2016 CA_{136}	—	February 6, 2016	Catalina	CSS	APO · PHA	650 m	MPC · JPL
538213	2016 CN_{138}	—	March 11, 2011	Mount Lemmon	Mount Lemmon Survey	·	2.1 km	MPC · JPL
538214	2016 CA_{140}	—	September 29, 2011	Mount Lemmon	Mount Lemmon Survey	·	560 m	MPC · JPL
538215	2016 CW_{140}	—	December 8, 2015	Haleakala	Pan-STARRS 1	H	560 m	MPC · JPL
538216	2016 CW_{141}	—	March 9, 2005	Mount Lemmon	Mount Lemmon Survey	·	1.1 km	MPC · JPL
538217	2016 CW_{142}	—	February 1, 2012	Kitt Peak	Spacewatch	·	1.1 km	MPC · JPL
538218	2016 CJ_{143}	—	March 3, 2005	Kitt Peak	Spacewatch	·	1.3 km	MPC · JPL
538219	2016 CO_{143}	—	August 27, 2009	Kitt Peak	Spacewatch	·	1.4 km	MPC · JPL
538220	2016 CS_{145}	—	February 3, 2009	Mount Lemmon	Mount Lemmon Survey	·	650 m	MPC · JPL
538221	2016 CL_{146}	—	November 14, 2006	Kitt Peak	Spacewatch	·	1.1 km	MPC · JPL
538222	2016 CX_{149}	—	September 6, 1996	Kitt Peak	Spacewatch	·	1.1 km	MPC · JPL
538223	2016 CX_{157}	—	December 7, 1996	Kitt Peak	Spacewatch	V	700 m	MPC · JPL
538224	2016 CR_{159}	—	September 12, 2007	Catalina	CSS	·	1.3 km	MPC · JPL
538225	2016 CJ_{178}	—	April 13, 2012	Haleakala	Pan-STARRS 1	·	1.9 km	MPC · JPL
538226	2016 CT_{188}	—	October 5, 2014	Haleakala	Pan-STARRS 1	BAR	1.2 km	MPC · JPL
538227	2016 CT_{195}	—	May 10, 2014	Haleakala	Pan-STARRS 1	H	470 m	MPC · JPL
538228	2016 CD_{196}	—	December 17, 2003	Kitt Peak	Spacewatch	·	1.5 km	MPC · JPL
538229	2016 CS_{197}	—	October 19, 2007	Kitt Peak	Spacewatch	·	920 m	MPC · JPL
538230	2016 CH_{199}	—	October 12, 2007	Mount Lemmon	Mount Lemmon Survey	·	860 m	MPC · JPL
538231	2016 CU_{201}	—	September 14, 2007	Mount Lemmon	Mount Lemmon Survey	·	970 m	MPC · JPL
538232	2016 CM_{202}	—	February 4, 2009	Mount Lemmon	Mount Lemmon Survey	NYS	630 m	MPC · JPL
538233	2016 CT_{204}	—	March 13, 2005	Kitt Peak	Spacewatch	·	2.1 km	MPC · JPL
538234	2016 CD_{205}	—	March 14, 1999	Kitt Peak	Spacewatch	·	570 m	MPC · JPL
538235	2016 CW_{205}	—	July 7, 2014	Haleakala	Pan-STARRS 1	·	570 m	MPC · JPL
538236	2016 CW_{207}	—	January 18, 2008	Mount Lemmon	Mount Lemmon Survey	·	1.1 km	MPC · JPL
538237	2016 CC_{213}	—	May 9, 2013	Haleakala	Pan-STARRS 1	·	670 m	MPC · JPL
538238	2016 CQ_{214}	—	April 16, 2012	Haleakala	Pan-STARRS 1	(12739)	1.6 km	MPC · JPL
538239	2016 CR_{215}	—	November 2, 2007	Kitt Peak	Spacewatch	NYS	920 m	MPC · JPL
538240	2016 CL_{218}	—	September 17, 1995	Kitt Peak	Spacewatch	AGN	1.1 km	MPC · JPL
538241	2016 CA_{219}	—	September 12, 2001	Socorro	LINEAR	·	1.3 km	MPC · JPL
538242	2016 CQ_{232}	—	February 25, 2012	Mount Lemmon	Mount Lemmon Survey	·	1.6 km	MPC · JPL
538243	2016 CM_{243}	—	November 22, 2006	Kitt Peak	Spacewatch	·	1.1 km	MPC · JPL
538244	2016 CF_{246}	—	January 11, 2016	Haleakala	Pan-STARRS 1	H	570 m	MPC · JPL
538245	2016 CR_{250}	—	January 11, 2008	Kitt Peak	Spacewatch	·	1.2 km	MPC · JPL
538246	2016 CG_{255}	—	October 16, 2003	Palomar	NEAT	EOS	2.6 km	MPC · JPL
538247	2016 CC_{258}	—	December 3, 2010	Mount Lemmon	Mount Lemmon Survey	·	1.5 km	MPC · JPL
538248	2016 CD_{258}	—	February 13, 2008	Mount Lemmon	Mount Lemmon Survey	·	1.2 km	MPC · JPL
538249	2016 CL_{259}	—	March 11, 2011	Mount Lemmon	Mount Lemmon Survey	BRA	1.6 km	MPC · JPL
538250	2016 CR_{259}	—	November 26, 2014	Haleakala	Pan-STARRS 1	RAF	1.0 km	MPC · JPL
538251	2016 CF_{260}	—	December 31, 2008	Mount Lemmon	Mount Lemmon Survey	·	620 m	MPC · JPL
538252	2016 CY_{262}	—	December 2, 2010	Mount Lemmon	Mount Lemmon Survey	·	1.7 km	MPC · JPL
538253	2016 CV_{265}	—	August 26, 2014	Haleakala	Pan-STARRS 1	H	360 m	MPC · JPL
538254	2016 CP_{266}	—	February 12, 2016	Haleakala	Pan-STARRS 1	H	410 m	MPC · JPL
538255	2016 CJ_{269}	—	January 18, 2012	Catalina	CSS	·	1.5 km	MPC · JPL
538256	2016 CO_{269}	—	May 1, 2010	WISE	WISE	EUP	2.8 km	MPC · JPL
538257	2016 CL_{275}	—	February 10, 2016	Haleakala	Pan-STARRS 1	HNS	1.2 km	MPC · JPL
538258	2016 CY_{277}	—	March 2, 2006	Kitt Peak	Spacewatch	EOS	2.1 km	MPC · JPL
538259	2016 CA_{278}	—	January 14, 2011	Mount Lemmon	Mount Lemmon Survey	ADE	2.2 km	MPC · JPL
538260	2016 CB_{278}	—	November 2, 2007	Mount Lemmon	Mount Lemmon Survey	V	540 m	MPC · JPL
538261	2016 CD_{278}	—	September 23, 2014	Mount Lemmon	Mount Lemmon Survey	·	1.1 km	MPC · JPL
538262	2016 CG_{278}	—	April 4, 2005	Catalina	CSS	·	1.1 km	MPC · JPL
538263	2016 CW_{278}	—	February 3, 2012	Haleakala	Pan-STARRS 1	·	950 m	MPC · JPL
538264	2016 CA_{279}	—	March 8, 2005	Mount Lemmon	Mount Lemmon Survey	EOS	2.0 km	MPC · JPL
538265	2016 CB_{279}	—	May 4, 2006	Kitt Peak	Spacewatch	EOS	1.7 km	MPC · JPL
538266	2016 CC_{279}	—	November 2, 2008	Mount Lemmon	Mount Lemmon Survey	·	2.1 km	MPC · JPL
538267	2016 CH_{279}	—	January 10, 2006	Mount Lemmon	Mount Lemmon Survey	·	2.4 km	MPC · JPL
538268	2016 CL_{279}	—	March 1, 2012	Mount Lemmon	Mount Lemmon Survey	·	1.8 km	MPC · JPL
538269	2016 CS_{279}	—	January 8, 2011	Mount Lemmon	Mount Lemmon Survey	·	1.3 km	MPC · JPL
538270	2016 CU_{279}	—	February 27, 2009	Kitt Peak	Spacewatch	·	800 m	MPC · JPL
538271	2016 CV_{279}	—	March 11, 2007	Mount Lemmon	Mount Lemmon Survey	·	1.5 km	MPC · JPL
538272	2016 CW_{279}	—	January 17, 2007	Catalina	CSS	·	1.4 km	MPC · JPL
538273	2016 CA_{280}	—	November 8, 2010	Mount Lemmon	Mount Lemmon Survey	·	870 m	MPC · JPL
538274	2016 CB_{280}	—	November 1, 2005	Mount Lemmon	Mount Lemmon Survey	·	1.7 km	MPC · JPL
538275	2016 CC_{280}	—	November 1, 2005	Mount Lemmon	Mount Lemmon Survey	·	1.7 km	MPC · JPL
538276	2016 CD_{280}	—	October 25, 2005	Catalina	CSS	·	1.7 km	MPC · JPL
538277	2016 CH_{280}	—	February 1, 2006	Mount Lemmon	Mount Lemmon Survey	·	520 m	MPC · JPL
538278	2016 CN_{280}	—	June 1, 2012	Mount Lemmon	Mount Lemmon Survey	·	2.5 km	MPC · JPL
538279	2016 CO_{280}	—	May 25, 2006	Mount Lemmon	Mount Lemmon Survey	·	2.8 km	MPC · JPL
538280	2016 CP_{280}	—	January 25, 2006	Kitt Peak	Spacewatch	·	2.0 km	MPC · JPL
538281	2016 CR_{280}	—	May 15, 2005	Palomar	NEAT	·	2.7 km	MPC · JPL
538282	2016 CS_{280}	—	October 15, 2013	Mount Lemmon	Mount Lemmon Survey	EOS	2.4 km	MPC · JPL
538283	2016 CC_{281}	—	January 28, 2007	Mount Lemmon	Mount Lemmon Survey	WIT	880 m	MPC · JPL
538284	2016 CF_{281}	—	September 27, 2009	Mount Lemmon	Mount Lemmon Survey	WIT	770 m	MPC · JPL
538285	2016 CM_{281}	—	December 25, 2005	Kitt Peak	Spacewatch	AGN	1.4 km	MPC · JPL
538286	2016 CU_{281}	—	October 22, 2009	Mount Lemmon	Mount Lemmon Survey	·	1.6 km	MPC · JPL
538287	2016 CC_{282}	—	November 14, 2014	Kitt Peak	Spacewatch	EUN	970 m	MPC · JPL
538288	2016 CG_{282}	—	November 18, 2006	Mount Lemmon	Mount Lemmon Survey	·	1.4 km	MPC · JPL
538289	2016 CL_{282}	—	October 29, 2003	Kitt Peak	Spacewatch	·	1.0 km	MPC · JPL
538290	2016 CN_{282}	—	September 14, 2007	Mount Lemmon	Mount Lemmon Survey	·	810 m	MPC · JPL
538291	2016 CQ_{282}	—	March 10, 2007	Mount Lemmon	Mount Lemmon Survey	AEO	1.0 km	MPC · JPL
538292	2016 CY_{282}	—	February 17, 2010	Mount Lemmon	Mount Lemmon Survey	·	4.0 km	MPC · JPL
538293	2016 CB_{283}	—	October 11, 1999	Kitt Peak	Spacewatch	DOR	2.4 km	MPC · JPL
538294	2016 CO_{283}	—	November 16, 2011	Kitt Peak	Spacewatch	·	770 m	MPC · JPL
538295	2016 CP_{283}	—	May 19, 2012	Mount Lemmon	Mount Lemmon Survey	·	1.9 km	MPC · JPL
538296	2016 CZ_{283}	—	December 10, 2013	Mount Lemmon	Mount Lemmon Survey	·	2.6 km	MPC · JPL
538297	2016 CE_{284}	—	November 27, 2013	Haleakala	Pan-STARRS 1	·	3.2 km	MPC · JPL
538298	2016 CH_{284}	—	October 7, 2007	Mount Lemmon	Mount Lemmon Survey	·	2.7 km	MPC · JPL
538299	2016 CK_{284}	—	February 14, 2016	Haleakala	Pan-STARRS 1	·	3.0 km	MPC · JPL
538300	2016 CM_{284}	—	November 4, 2007	Mount Lemmon	Mount Lemmon Survey	TIR	3.4 km	MPC · JPL

== 538301–538400 ==
back to top

Designation			Discovery			Properties		Ref
Permanent	Provisional	Named after	Date	Site	Discoverer(s)	Category	Diam.	Ref
538301	2016 CT_{284}	—	December 30, 2007	Mount Lemmon	Mount Lemmon Survey	·	1.5 km	MPC · JPL
538302	2016 CB_{285}	—	March 16, 2012	Mount Lemmon	Mount Lemmon Survey	·	1.4 km	MPC · JPL
538303	2016 CD_{285}	—	March 22, 2012	Mount Lemmon	Mount Lemmon Survey	·	1.2 km	MPC · JPL
538304	2016 CF_{285}	—	April 14, 2008	Mount Lemmon	Mount Lemmon Survey	·	1.2 km	MPC · JPL
538305	2016 CR_{285}	—	February 28, 2012	Haleakala	Pan-STARRS 1	HNS	940 m	MPC · JPL
538306	2016 CD_{286}	—	November 28, 2014	Haleakala	Pan-STARRS 1	EUN	1.0 km	MPC · JPL
538307	2016 CX_{286}	—	December 24, 2014	Mount Lemmon	Mount Lemmon Survey	·	2.8 km	MPC · JPL
538308	2016 CW_{288}	—	February 12, 2011	Mount Lemmon	Mount Lemmon Survey	·	1.9 km	MPC · JPL
538309	2016 CZ_{288}	—	September 26, 2013	Catalina	CSS	·	3.1 km	MPC · JPL
538310	2016 CY_{289}	—	July 14, 2013	Haleakala	Pan-STARRS 1	·	1.2 km	MPC · JPL
538311	2016 CK_{290}	—	May 12, 2012	Haleakala	Pan-STARRS 1	·	1.3 km	MPC · JPL
538312	2016 CL_{290}	—	May 15, 2012	Haleakala	Pan-STARRS 1	·	1.1 km	MPC · JPL
538313	2016 CV_{290}	—	January 20, 2015	Haleakala	Pan-STARRS 1	·	2.7 km	MPC · JPL
538314	2016 CO_{291}	—	October 1, 2008	Catalina	CSS	BRA	1.6 km	MPC · JPL
538315	2016 CT_{291}	—	January 26, 2011	Mount Lemmon	Mount Lemmon Survey	HOF	2.3 km	MPC · JPL
538316	2016 CW_{291}	—	February 28, 2012	Haleakala	Pan-STARRS 1	·	950 m	MPC · JPL
538317	2016 CC_{292}	—	September 16, 2009	Mount Lemmon	Mount Lemmon Survey	·	1.7 km	MPC · JPL
538318	2016 CD_{292}	—	January 14, 2008	Kitt Peak	Spacewatch	·	1.1 km	MPC · JPL
538319	2016 CK_{292}	—	December 10, 2009	Mount Lemmon	Mount Lemmon Survey	·	2.2 km	MPC · JPL
538320	2016 CM_{292}	—	April 20, 2007	Kitt Peak	Spacewatch	·	2.2 km	MPC · JPL
538321	2016 CU_{292}	—	September 27, 2009	Kitt Peak	Spacewatch	·	1.7 km	MPC · JPL
538322	2016 CV_{292}	—	August 15, 2013	Haleakala	Pan-STARRS 1	EUN	1.1 km	MPC · JPL
538323	2016 CX_{292}	—	November 20, 2014	Haleakala	Pan-STARRS 1	·	1.2 km	MPC · JPL
538324	2016 CD_{293}	—	February 2, 2005	Kitt Peak	Spacewatch	PHO	710 m	MPC · JPL
538325	2016 CF_{293}	—	January 27, 2011	Kitt Peak	Spacewatch	MRX	1.0 km	MPC · JPL
538326	2016 CK_{293}	—	April 17, 2009	Kitt Peak	Spacewatch	·	1.3 km	MPC · JPL
538327	2016 CL_{293}	—	June 1, 2003	Kitt Peak	Spacewatch	·	2.5 km	MPC · JPL
538328	2016 CX_{293}	—	January 26, 2012	Mount Lemmon	Mount Lemmon Survey	CLA	1.3 km	MPC · JPL
538329	2016 CZ_{293}	—	September 13, 2007	Mount Lemmon	Mount Lemmon Survey	·	890 m	MPC · JPL
538330	2016 CA_{294}	—	December 5, 2005	Kitt Peak	Spacewatch	·	1.8 km	MPC · JPL
538331	2016 CD_{294}	—	February 13, 2011	Mount Lemmon	Mount Lemmon Survey	GEF	1.1 km	MPC · JPL
538332	2016 CE_{294}	—	September 21, 2008	Kitt Peak	Spacewatch	·	2.2 km	MPC · JPL
538333	2016 CO_{294}	—	September 28, 2003	Kitt Peak	Spacewatch	·	2.0 km	MPC · JPL
538334	2016 CP_{294}	—	December 8, 2010	Mount Lemmon	Mount Lemmon Survey	·	1.5 km	MPC · JPL
538335	2016 CR_{294}	—	January 19, 2012	Haleakala	Pan-STARRS 1	·	1.0 km	MPC · JPL
538336	2016 CS_{294}	—	October 27, 2014	Haleakala	Pan-STARRS 1	·	1.6 km	MPC · JPL
538337	2016 CY_{294}	—	February 3, 2009	Mount Lemmon	Mount Lemmon Survey	·	790 m	MPC · JPL
538338	2016 CQ_{295}	—	April 12, 2013	Haleakala	Pan-STARRS 1	·	930 m	MPC · JPL
538339	2016 CC_{296}	—	March 3, 2009	Mount Lemmon	Mount Lemmon Survey	MAS	630 m	MPC · JPL
538340	2016 CZ_{296}	—	October 31, 2014	Mount Lemmon	Mount Lemmon Survey	MAR	1.1 km	MPC · JPL
538341	2016 CK_{297}	—	July 27, 2001	Haleakala	NEAT	·	2.5 km	MPC · JPL
538342	2016 CD_{299}	—	March 14, 2012	Mount Lemmon	Mount Lemmon Survey	MAR	1.1 km	MPC · JPL
538343	2016 CF_{299}	—	March 8, 2008	Mount Lemmon	Mount Lemmon Survey	·	1.3 km	MPC · JPL
538344	2016 CT_{299}	—	September 1, 2013	Mount Lemmon	Mount Lemmon Survey	·	2.1 km	MPC · JPL
538345	2016 CA_{302}	—	September 23, 2014	Mount Lemmon	Mount Lemmon Survey	·	850 m	MPC · JPL
538346	2016 CP_{302}	—	January 15, 2015	Haleakala	Pan-STARRS 1	·	1.1 km	MPC · JPL
538347	2016 CH_{303}	—	February 1, 2008	Mount Lemmon	Mount Lemmon Survey	·	1.0 km	MPC · JPL
538348	2016 CT_{303}	—	March 12, 2005	Kitt Peak	Spacewatch	CLA	1.2 km	MPC · JPL
538349	2016 CV_{303}	—	September 3, 2014	Mount Lemmon	Mount Lemmon Survey	·	1.1 km	MPC · JPL
538350	2016 CK_{304}	—	November 25, 2005	Kitt Peak	Spacewatch	·	2.3 km	MPC · JPL
538351	2016 CO_{304}	—	April 30, 2012	Kitt Peak	Spacewatch	·	2.2 km	MPC · JPL
538352	2016 CV_{304}	—	April 4, 2008	Mount Lemmon	Mount Lemmon Survey	EUN	1.2 km	MPC · JPL
538353	2016 CE_{305}	—	January 28, 2007	Kitt Peak	Spacewatch	·	1.2 km	MPC · JPL
538354	2016 CH_{306}	—	September 27, 2005	Kitt Peak	Spacewatch	·	1.1 km	MPC · JPL
538355	2016 CU_{307}	—	December 29, 2014	Haleakala	Pan-STARRS 1	·	3.2 km	MPC · JPL
538356	2016 CC_{308}	—	September 5, 2010	Mount Lemmon	Mount Lemmon Survey	MAR	840 m	MPC · JPL
538357	2016 CN_{308}	—	August 29, 2009	Kitt Peak	Spacewatch	·	1.4 km	MPC · JPL
538358	2016 CZ_{308}	—	October 22, 2009	Mount Lemmon	Mount Lemmon Survey	PAD	1.3 km	MPC · JPL
538359	2016 CH_{309}	—	August 14, 2013	Haleakala	Pan-STARRS 1	·	1.9 km	MPC · JPL
538360	2016 CK_{309}	—	July 13, 2013	Haleakala	Pan-STARRS 1	·	1.4 km	MPC · JPL
538361	2016 CV_{309}	—	February 9, 2016	Haleakala	Pan-STARRS 1	·	2.1 km	MPC · JPL
538362	2016 CO_{311}	—	March 30, 2012	Kitt Peak	Spacewatch	·	840 m	MPC · JPL
538363	2016 CK_{312}	—	November 30, 2010	Mount Lemmon	Mount Lemmon Survey	·	1.0 km	MPC · JPL
538364	2016 CM_{312}	—	February 10, 2016	Haleakala	Pan-STARRS 1	·	1.0 km	MPC · JPL
538365	2016 CR_{312}	—	August 13, 2012	Siding Spring	SSS	·	3.0 km	MPC · JPL
538366	2016 CJ_{313}	—	November 26, 2014	Haleakala	Pan-STARRS 1	·	1.5 km	MPC · JPL
538367	2016 CS_{313}	—	February 10, 2016	Haleakala	Pan-STARRS 1	·	2.4 km	MPC · JPL
538368	2016 CC_{314}	—	March 12, 2005	Kitt Peak	Spacewatch	·	2.8 km	MPC · JPL
538369	2016 CD_{314}	—	October 25, 2014	Mount Lemmon	Mount Lemmon Survey	·	550 m	MPC · JPL
538370	2016 CN_{314}	—	January 29, 2011	Kitt Peak	Spacewatch	·	2.0 km	MPC · JPL
538371	2016 CP_{314}	—	November 25, 2014	Mount Lemmon	Mount Lemmon Survey	PHO	780 m	MPC · JPL
538372	2016 CR_{314}	—	September 14, 2013	Mount Lemmon	Mount Lemmon Survey	·	2.2 km	MPC · JPL
538373	2016 CM_{317}	—	April 7, 2011	Kitt Peak	Spacewatch	·	2.9 km	MPC · JPL
538374	2016 CB_{318}	—	November 3, 2007	Kitt Peak	Spacewatch	·	860 m	MPC · JPL
538375	2016 CM_{318}	—	February 11, 2016	Haleakala	Pan-STARRS 1	·	1.2 km	MPC · JPL
538376	2016 CO_{318}	—	August 31, 2005	Kitt Peak	Spacewatch	HNS	940 m	MPC · JPL
538377	2016 CQ_{318}	—	December 18, 2007	Kitt Peak	Spacewatch	·	1.0 km	MPC · JPL
538378	2016 CY_{318}	—	December 21, 2006	Kitt Peak	Spacewatch	·	1.1 km	MPC · JPL
538379	2016 CR_{319}	—	May 31, 2011	Kitt Peak	Spacewatch	EOS	1.7 km	MPC · JPL
538380	2016 CX_{319}	—	January 25, 2015	Haleakala	Pan-STARRS 1	·	2.1 km	MPC · JPL
538381	2016 CB_{320}	—	May 21, 2012	Mount Lemmon	Mount Lemmon Survey	·	1.8 km	MPC · JPL
538382	2016 CC_{320}	—	January 30, 2011	Haleakala	Pan-STARRS 1	·	2.4 km	MPC · JPL
538383	2016 CE_{320}	—	July 16, 2013	Haleakala	Pan-STARRS 1	HNS	950 m	MPC · JPL
538384	2016 CL_{320}	—	January 17, 2015	Mount Lemmon	Mount Lemmon Survey	·	2.7 km	MPC · JPL
538385	2016 CS_{320}	—	February 11, 2016	Haleakala	Pan-STARRS 1	·	600 m	MPC · JPL
538386	2016 CA_{321}	—	February 18, 2010	Mount Lemmon	Mount Lemmon Survey	·	3.0 km	MPC · JPL
538387	2016 CF_{321}	—	November 16, 2014	Mount Lemmon	Mount Lemmon Survey	·	2.5 km	MPC · JPL
538388	2016 CZ_{321}	—	February 13, 2016	Haleakala	Pan-STARRS 1	EUN	1.5 km	MPC · JPL
538389	2016 CG_{322}	—	August 13, 2012	Haleakala	Pan-STARRS 1	TIR	3.1 km	MPC · JPL
538390	2016 CL_{322}	—	November 12, 2014	Haleakala	Pan-STARRS 1	MAR	870 m	MPC · JPL
538391	2016 CN_{322}	—	February 14, 2016	Haleakala	Pan-STARRS 1	·	3.2 km	MPC · JPL
538392	2016 CO_{322}	—	December 10, 2005	Kitt Peak	Spacewatch	·	2.4 km	MPC · JPL
538393	2016 DZ_{1}	—	May 23, 2011	Mount Lemmon	Mount Lemmon Survey	H	500 m	MPC · JPL
538394	2016 DS_{6}	—	February 2, 2005	Kitt Peak	Spacewatch	MAS	660 m	MPC · JPL
538395	2016 DR_{8}	—	August 15, 2009	Kitt Peak	Spacewatch	WIT	860 m	MPC · JPL
538396	2016 DC_{10}	—	March 24, 2003	Kitt Peak	Spacewatch	·	1.6 km	MPC · JPL
538397	2016 DH_{15}	—	October 1, 2005	Catalina	CSS	HNS	1.3 km	MPC · JPL
538398	2016 DL_{15}	—	November 15, 1999	Socorro	LINEAR	NYS	1.2 km	MPC · JPL
538399	2016 DH_{18}	—	January 22, 2006	Mount Lemmon	Mount Lemmon Survey	·	530 m	MPC · JPL
538400	2016 DO_{18}	—	March 9, 2000	Kitt Peak	Spacewatch	EOS	2.0 km	MPC · JPL

== 538401–538500 ==
back to top

Designation			Discovery			Properties		Ref
Permanent	Provisional	Named after	Date	Site	Discoverer(s)	Category	Diam.	Ref
538401	2016 DY_{18}	—	March 4, 2005	Kitt Peak	Spacewatch	·	1.2 km	MPC · JPL
538402	2016 DZ_{18}	—	February 27, 2012	Haleakala	Pan-STARRS 1	·	1.2 km	MPC · JPL
538403	2016 DT_{23}	—	October 16, 2001	Kitt Peak	Spacewatch	·	1.3 km	MPC · JPL
538404	2016 DE_{24}	—	February 27, 2012	Kitt Peak	Spacewatch	·	1.5 km	MPC · JPL
538405	2016 DY_{28}	—	January 23, 2006	Kitt Peak	Spacewatch	·	620 m	MPC · JPL
538406	2016 DQ_{29}	—	August 22, 2014	Haleakala	Pan-STARRS 1	V	570 m	MPC · JPL
538407	2016 DN_{30}	—	February 20, 2009	Kitt Peak	Spacewatch	·	840 m	MPC · JPL
538408	2016 DE_{31}	—	November 28, 2012	Haleakala	Pan-STARRS 1	H	450 m	MPC · JPL
538409	2016 DN_{32}	—	September 28, 2013	Mount Lemmon	Mount Lemmon Survey	·	3.6 km	MPC · JPL
538410	2016 DO_{32}	—	March 4, 2012	Mount Lemmon	Mount Lemmon Survey	EUN	1.1 km	MPC · JPL
538411	2016 DR_{32}	—	February 13, 2007	Mount Lemmon	Mount Lemmon Survey	·	1.5 km	MPC · JPL
538412	2016 DX_{32}	—	February 10, 2008	Mount Lemmon	Mount Lemmon Survey	·	900 m	MPC · JPL
538413	2016 DD_{33}	—	July 14, 2013	Haleakala	Pan-STARRS 1	·	1.1 km	MPC · JPL
538414	2016 DL_{33}	—	January 31, 2011	Westfield	International Astronomical Search Collaboration	·	2.0 km	MPC · JPL
538415	2016 DV_{33}	—	September 20, 2009	Kitt Peak	Spacewatch	·	1.5 km	MPC · JPL
538416	2016 DX_{33}	—	October 23, 2011	Haleakala	Pan-STARRS 1	·	570 m	MPC · JPL
538417	2016 DC_{35}	—	January 30, 2012	Kitt Peak	Spacewatch	·	980 m	MPC · JPL
538418	2016 DP_{35}	—	April 27, 2011	Kitt Peak	Spacewatch	·	3.2 km	MPC · JPL
538419	2016 EX_{2}	—	October 26, 2008	Mount Lemmon	Mount Lemmon Survey	·	780 m	MPC · JPL
538420	2016 EQ_{16}	—	January 18, 2010	WISE	WISE	·	1.6 km	MPC · JPL
538421	2016 ES_{24}	—	January 5, 2012	Kitt Peak	Spacewatch	·	1.1 km	MPC · JPL
538422	2016 ED_{26}	—	July 13, 2013	Haleakala	Pan-STARRS 1	·	3.3 km	MPC · JPL
538423	2016 EO_{37}	—	December 2, 2005	Mount Lemmon	Mount Lemmon Survey	·	2.3 km	MPC · JPL
538424	2016 EH_{44}	—	May 8, 2013	Haleakala	Pan-STARRS 1	V	560 m	MPC · JPL
538425	2016 EB_{51}	—	October 18, 2009	Catalina	CSS	H	470 m	MPC · JPL
538426	2016 EU_{52}	—	November 14, 1998	Kitt Peak	Spacewatch	·	830 m	MPC · JPL
538427	2016 EY_{55}	—	January 18, 2016	Haleakala	Pan-STARRS 1	H	550 m	MPC · JPL
538428	2016 ES_{56}	—	January 17, 2007	Catalina	CSS	EUN	1.3 km	MPC · JPL
538429	2016 EU_{58}	—	March 5, 2008	Mount Lemmon	Mount Lemmon Survey	·	1.6 km	MPC · JPL
538430	2016 EN_{66}	—	December 18, 2009	Mount Lemmon	Mount Lemmon Survey	·	2.4 km	MPC · JPL
538431	2016 EQ_{68}	—	November 21, 2008	Mount Lemmon	Mount Lemmon Survey	·	880 m	MPC · JPL
538432	2016 EM_{74}	—	January 13, 2005	Kitt Peak	Spacewatch	NYS	780 m	MPC · JPL
538433	2016 EK_{77}	—	October 19, 2000	Kitt Peak	Spacewatch	·	860 m	MPC · JPL
538434	2016 EC_{78}	—	September 20, 2014	Haleakala	Pan-STARRS 1	·	1.1 km	MPC · JPL
538435	2016 ER_{78}	—	August 12, 2013	Haleakala	Pan-STARRS 1	·	1.6 km	MPC · JPL
538436	2016 EJ_{87}	—	January 28, 2011	Kitt Peak	Spacewatch	·	1.7 km	MPC · JPL
538437	2016 EW_{87}	—	April 25, 2007	Mount Lemmon	Mount Lemmon Survey	·	1.7 km	MPC · JPL
538438	2016 EM_{88}	—	April 15, 2012	Haleakala	Pan-STARRS 1	EUN	1.2 km	MPC · JPL
538439	2016 EE_{94}	—	August 23, 2014	Haleakala	Pan-STARRS 1	V	510 m	MPC · JPL
538440	2016 ER_{104}	—	November 23, 2014	Haleakala	Pan-STARRS 1	·	1.1 km	MPC · JPL
538441	2016 EX_{108}	—	January 13, 2016	Haleakala	Pan-STARRS 1	HNS	960 m	MPC · JPL
538442	2016 EL_{110}	—	March 27, 2011	Mount Lemmon	Mount Lemmon Survey	·	2.2 km	MPC · JPL
538443	2016 ES_{111}	—	March 22, 2012	Mount Lemmon	Mount Lemmon Survey	EUN	1.3 km	MPC · JPL
538444	2016 EJ_{114}	—	March 8, 2008	Kitt Peak	Spacewatch	H	360 m	MPC · JPL
538445	2016 EL_{117}	—	September 19, 2014	Haleakala	Pan-STARRS 1	·	580 m	MPC · JPL
538446	2016 EX_{119}	—	December 29, 2011	Mount Lemmon	Mount Lemmon Survey	·	1.1 km	MPC · JPL
538447	2016 EZ_{121}	—	November 18, 2011	Mount Lemmon	Mount Lemmon Survey	ERI	1.5 km	MPC · JPL
538448	2016 ER_{122}	—	April 15, 2012	Haleakala	Pan-STARRS 1	·	1.2 km	MPC · JPL
538449	2016 EY_{122}	—	January 5, 2006	Mount Lemmon	Mount Lemmon Survey	·	430 m	MPC · JPL
538450	2016 EE_{125}	—	March 4, 2005	Catalina	CSS	·	920 m	MPC · JPL
538451	2016 ER_{125}	—	August 9, 2013	Haleakala	Pan-STARRS 1	WIT	880 m	MPC · JPL
538452	2016 EL_{126}	—	September 30, 2005	Mount Lemmon	Mount Lemmon Survey	EUN	1.4 km	MPC · JPL
538453	2016 EN_{127}	—	April 5, 2011	Kitt Peak	Spacewatch	EOS	1.6 km	MPC · JPL
538454	2016 EQ_{128}	—	October 1, 2005	Mount Lemmon	Mount Lemmon Survey	·	1.3 km	MPC · JPL
538455	2016 EN_{130}	—	July 15, 2013	Haleakala	Pan-STARRS 1	·	1.2 km	MPC · JPL
538456	2016 ET_{131}	—	September 28, 2009	Mount Lemmon	Mount Lemmon Survey	HNS	940 m	MPC · JPL
538457	2016 EA_{134}	—	April 1, 2012	Mount Lemmon	Mount Lemmon Survey	·	1.2 km	MPC · JPL
538458	2016 EN_{134}	—	July 7, 2013	Bergisch Gladbach	W. Bickel	·	660 m	MPC · JPL
538459	2016 EX_{136}	—	October 6, 2008	Kitt Peak	Spacewatch	·	1.7 km	MPC · JPL
538460	2016 EP_{139}	—	August 31, 2005	Kitt Peak	Spacewatch	·	1.5 km	MPC · JPL
538461	2016 EG_{141}	—	February 23, 2012	Mount Lemmon	Mount Lemmon Survey	EUN	1.3 km	MPC · JPL
538462	2016 EX_{141}	—	January 8, 2016	Haleakala	Pan-STARRS 1	V	570 m	MPC · JPL
538463	2016 EN_{143}	—	March 26, 2007	Kitt Peak	Spacewatch	·	1.7 km	MPC · JPL
538464	2016 EB_{145}	—	January 19, 2012	Haleakala	Pan-STARRS 1	·	990 m	MPC · JPL
538465	2016 EB_{146}	—	November 19, 2009	Mount Lemmon	Mount Lemmon Survey	·	1.8 km	MPC · JPL
538466	2016 EJ_{146}	—	January 10, 2008	Kitt Peak	Spacewatch	·	1.3 km	MPC · JPL
538467	2016 EN_{149}	—	May 8, 2008	Kitt Peak	Spacewatch	·	1.0 km	MPC · JPL
538468	2016 EE_{150}	—	November 10, 2010	Kitt Peak	Spacewatch	·	920 m	MPC · JPL
538469	2016 EJ_{150}	—	May 12, 2012	Mount Lemmon	Mount Lemmon Survey	·	1.2 km	MPC · JPL
538470	2016 EQ_{150}	—	September 20, 2014	Haleakala	Pan-STARRS 1	·	610 m	MPC · JPL
538471	2016 EE_{151}	—	April 26, 2000	Kitt Peak	Spacewatch	EOS	2.4 km	MPC · JPL
538472	2016 ER_{152}	—	December 26, 2011	Mount Lemmon	Mount Lemmon Survey	·	1.3 km	MPC · JPL
538473	2016 EE_{159}	—	October 2, 2009	Mount Lemmon	Mount Lemmon Survey	EUN	960 m	MPC · JPL
538474	2016 ES_{160}	—	March 30, 2011	Mount Lemmon	Mount Lemmon Survey	KOR	1.4 km	MPC · JPL
538475	2016 ED_{162}	—	March 29, 2001	Kitt Peak	Spacewatch	·	830 m	MPC · JPL
538476	2016 EE_{163}	—	March 19, 2013	Haleakala	Pan-STARRS 1	·	690 m	MPC · JPL
538477	2016 EB_{164}	—	September 2, 2014	Haleakala	Pan-STARRS 1	·	890 m	MPC · JPL
538478	2016 EO_{166}	—	March 14, 2010	Kitt Peak	Spacewatch	·	3.6 km	MPC · JPL
538479	2016 EZ_{168}	—	March 24, 2003	Kitt Peak	Spacewatch	·	1.6 km	MPC · JPL
538480	2016 EA_{169}	—	September 4, 2010	Mount Lemmon	Mount Lemmon Survey	·	540 m	MPC · JPL
538481	2016 EV_{170}	—	January 18, 2016	Haleakala	Pan-STARRS 1	·	790 m	MPC · JPL
538482	2016 EZ_{172}	—	February 22, 2009	Kitt Peak	Spacewatch	·	930 m	MPC · JPL
538483	2016 EP_{175}	—	January 9, 2011	Kitt Peak	Spacewatch	·	2.0 km	MPC · JPL
538484	2016 EQ_{176}	—	September 23, 2014	Mount Lemmon	Mount Lemmon Survey	·	640 m	MPC · JPL
538485	2016 ED_{177}	—	February 14, 2010	Mount Lemmon	Mount Lemmon Survey	·	2.3 km	MPC · JPL
538486	2016 EP_{179}	—	August 27, 2014	Haleakala	Pan-STARRS 1	·	810 m	MPC · JPL
538487	2016 EP_{180}	—	October 1, 2013	Kitt Peak	Spacewatch	EOS	1.5 km	MPC · JPL
538488	2016 EM_{181}	—	March 14, 2007	Kitt Peak	Spacewatch	·	1.8 km	MPC · JPL
538489	2016 EO_{181}	—	September 23, 2009	Mount Lemmon	Mount Lemmon Survey	HNS	1.2 km	MPC · JPL
538490	2016 ED_{186}	—	October 26, 2011	Haleakala	Pan-STARRS 1	·	480 m	MPC · JPL
538491	2016 EX_{186}	—	June 20, 2013	Haleakala	Pan-STARRS 1	·	1.8 km	MPC · JPL
538492	2016 EH_{187}	—	August 13, 2008	La Sagra	OAM	·	2.4 km	MPC · JPL
538493	2016 ES_{188}	—	March 21, 2012	Mount Lemmon	Mount Lemmon Survey	HNS	880 m	MPC · JPL
538494	2016 EG_{190}	—	April 27, 2012	Haleakala	Pan-STARRS 1	·	1.5 km	MPC · JPL
538495	2016 EB_{195}	—	February 3, 2016	Haleakala	Pan-STARRS 1	centaur	20 km	MPC · JPL
538496	2016 EQ_{198}	—	March 31, 2009	Mount Lemmon	Mount Lemmon Survey	·	580 m	MPC · JPL
538497	2016 EQ_{199}	—	February 28, 2009	Kitt Peak	Spacewatch	·	940 m	MPC · JPL
538498	2016 EX_{199}	—	October 30, 2014	Kitt Peak	Spacewatch	·	1.3 km	MPC · JPL
538499	2016 EH_{200}	—	April 19, 2012	Siding Spring	SSS	EUN	1.5 km	MPC · JPL
538500	2016 ET_{201}	—	March 12, 2005	Mount Lemmon	Mount Lemmon Survey	V	660 m	MPC · JPL

== 538501–538600 ==
back to top

Designation			Discovery			Properties		Ref
Permanent	Provisional	Named after	Date	Site	Discoverer(s)	Category	Diam.	Ref
538501	2016 ED_{203}	—	October 26, 2012	Haleakala	Pan-STARRS 1	H	490 m	MPC · JPL
538502	2016 EU_{204}	—	March 3, 2016	Mount Lemmon	Mount Lemmon Survey	H	470 m	MPC · JPL
538503	2016 EY_{204}	—	April 4, 2005	Catalina	CSS	H	460 m	MPC · JPL
538504	2016 EE_{206}	—	March 2, 2016	Haleakala	Pan-STARRS 1	H	380 m	MPC · JPL
538505	2016 EY_{207}	—	March 3, 2016	Haleakala	Pan-STARRS 1	·	2.0 km	MPC · JPL
538506	2016 EX_{208}	—	September 13, 2007	Anderson Mesa	LONEOS	·	2.9 km	MPC · JPL
538507	2016 EX_{209}	—	March 5, 2016	Haleakala	Pan-STARRS 1	ELF	3.2 km	MPC · JPL
538508	2016 EH_{211}	—	April 7, 2006	Kitt Peak	Spacewatch	·	1.7 km	MPC · JPL
538509	2016 EJ_{215}	—	October 4, 2013	Catalina	CSS	·	2.3 km	MPC · JPL
538510	2016 EO_{215}	—	October 24, 2013	Mount Lemmon	Mount Lemmon Survey	EOS	1.6 km	MPC · JPL
538511	2016 EP_{215}	—	March 11, 2005	Mount Lemmon	Mount Lemmon Survey	·	2.5 km	MPC · JPL
538512	2016 ER_{215}	—	March 18, 2005	Catalina	CSS	·	3.2 km	MPC · JPL
538513	2016 ET_{215}	—	October 7, 2007	Kitt Peak	Spacewatch	VER	2.6 km	MPC · JPL
538514	2016 EU_{215}	—	February 14, 2010	Mount Lemmon	Mount Lemmon Survey	·	2.0 km	MPC · JPL
538515	2016 EA_{216}	—	February 26, 2012	Haleakala	Pan-STARRS 1	·	890 m	MPC · JPL
538516	2016 EC_{216}	—	March 11, 2005	Mount Lemmon	Mount Lemmon Survey	·	840 m	MPC · JPL
538517	2016 EV_{216}	—	September 10, 2007	Mount Lemmon	Mount Lemmon Survey	·	2.9 km	MPC · JPL
538518	2016 EX_{216}	—	November 29, 2014	Kitt Peak	Spacewatch	JUN	1.1 km	MPC · JPL
538519	2016 EC_{217}	—	April 28, 2008	Kitt Peak	Spacewatch	·	1.7 km	MPC · JPL
538520	2016 EN_{217}	—	October 7, 2005	Mount Lemmon	Mount Lemmon Survey	·	1.1 km	MPC · JPL
538521	2016 EO_{217}	—	November 25, 2005	Mount Lemmon	Mount Lemmon Survey	·	1.2 km	MPC · JPL
538522	2016 EQ_{217}	—	September 25, 2012	Mount Lemmon	Mount Lemmon Survey	·	2.4 km	MPC · JPL
538523	2016 ES_{217}	—	February 6, 2011	Mount Lemmon	Mount Lemmon Survey	WIT	860 m	MPC · JPL
538524	2016 EV_{217}	—	October 26, 2008	Mount Lemmon	Mount Lemmon Survey	EOS	2.1 km	MPC · JPL
538525	2016 EZ_{217}	—	February 5, 2006	Mount Lemmon	Mount Lemmon Survey	·	1.9 km	MPC · JPL
538526	2016 EE_{218}	—	February 25, 2006	Mount Lemmon	Mount Lemmon Survey	·	1.5 km	MPC · JPL
538527	2016 EF_{218}	—	March 10, 2016	Haleakala	Pan-STARRS 1	·	1.7 km	MPC · JPL
538528	2016 EG_{218}	—	August 7, 2008	Kitt Peak	Spacewatch	HOF	2.6 km	MPC · JPL
538529	2016 EU_{218}	—	March 20, 2007	Mount Lemmon	Mount Lemmon Survey	·	1.7 km	MPC · JPL
538530	2016 EV_{218}	—	December 14, 2010	Mount Lemmon	Mount Lemmon Survey	·	1.2 km	MPC · JPL
538531	2016 EW_{218}	—	March 6, 2011	Mount Lemmon	Mount Lemmon Survey	·	1.5 km	MPC · JPL
538532	2016 EX_{218}	—	February 10, 2011	Mount Lemmon	Mount Lemmon Survey	·	1.6 km	MPC · JPL
538533	2016 EZ_{218}	—	March 14, 2007	Mount Lemmon	Mount Lemmon Survey	·	1.7 km	MPC · JPL
538534	2016 EB_{219}	—	January 10, 2008	Mount Lemmon	Mount Lemmon Survey	·	1.5 km	MPC · JPL
538535	2016 EF_{219}	—	September 24, 2009	Mount Lemmon	Mount Lemmon Survey	·	1.7 km	MPC · JPL
538536	2016 EK_{219}	—	January 18, 2008	Mount Lemmon	Mount Lemmon Survey	SUL	1.5 km	MPC · JPL
538537	2016 EL_{219}	—	February 13, 2007	Mount Lemmon	Mount Lemmon Survey	·	1.1 km	MPC · JPL
538538	2016 EM_{219}	—	February 23, 2007	Mount Lemmon	Mount Lemmon Survey	·	1.5 km	MPC · JPL
538539	2016 EN_{219}	—	February 10, 2007	Mount Lemmon	Mount Lemmon Survey	EUN	1.1 km	MPC · JPL
538540	2016 EO_{219}	—	December 16, 2014	Haleakala	Pan-STARRS 1	·	1.5 km	MPC · JPL
538541	2016 EU_{219}	—	October 13, 2014	Mount Lemmon	Mount Lemmon Survey	·	860 m	MPC · JPL
538542	2016 EW_{219}	—	August 24, 2012	Mayhill	L. Elenin	·	1.7 km	MPC · JPL
538543	2016 ED_{220}	—	December 6, 2008	Kitt Peak	Spacewatch	·	2.7 km	MPC · JPL
538544	2016 EM_{220}	—	October 27, 2005	Catalina	CSS	EUN	1.3 km	MPC · JPL
538545	2016 EP_{220}	—	August 16, 2012	Siding Spring	SSS	·	3.8 km	MPC · JPL
538546	2016 EU_{220}	—	September 1, 2013	Haleakala	Pan-STARRS 1	AST	1.4 km	MPC · JPL
538547	2016 EA_{221}	—	October 24, 2009	Kitt Peak	Spacewatch	·	1.5 km	MPC · JPL
538548	2016 EC_{221}	—	March 16, 2007	Mount Lemmon	Mount Lemmon Survey	·	2.8 km	MPC · JPL
538549	2016 EE_{221}	—	October 20, 2007	Mount Lemmon	Mount Lemmon Survey	·	2.7 km	MPC · JPL
538550	2016 EL_{221}	—	April 16, 2007	Mount Lemmon	Mount Lemmon Survey	·	1.7 km	MPC · JPL
538551	2016 EO_{221}	—	October 16, 2007	Mount Lemmon	Mount Lemmon Survey	·	2.4 km	MPC · JPL
538552	2016 EV_{221}	—	August 22, 2008	Kitt Peak	Spacewatch	EUN	1.3 km	MPC · JPL
538553	2016 EZ_{221}	—	October 24, 1998	Kitt Peak	Spacewatch	EOS	2.2 km	MPC · JPL
538554	2016 EH_{222}	—	December 18, 2007	Mount Lemmon	Mount Lemmon Survey	·	4.6 km	MPC · JPL
538555	2016 EW_{222}	—	October 3, 2013	Haleakala	Pan-STARRS 1	KOR	1.3 km	MPC · JPL
538556	2016 EX_{222}	—	March 5, 2008	Kitt Peak	Spacewatch	·	800 m	MPC · JPL
538557	2016 EY_{222}	—	October 30, 2014	Mount Lemmon	Mount Lemmon Survey	·	870 m	MPC · JPL
538558	2016 EA_{223}	—	January 10, 2006	Kitt Peak	Spacewatch	·	2.0 km	MPC · JPL
538559	2016 ED_{223}	—	March 10, 2016	Haleakala	Pan-STARRS 1	·	960 m	MPC · JPL
538560	2016 EF_{223}	—	July 14, 2013	Haleakala	Pan-STARRS 1	·	1.5 km	MPC · JPL
538561	2016 EQ_{223}	—	November 10, 2009	Kitt Peak	Spacewatch	·	3.3 km	MPC · JPL
538562	2016 ES_{223}	—	April 29, 2008	Mount Lemmon	Mount Lemmon Survey	·	1.0 km	MPC · JPL
538563	2016 EC_{225}	—	September 7, 2008	Mount Lemmon	Mount Lemmon Survey	KOR	1.2 km	MPC · JPL
538564	2016 EE_{225}	—	October 23, 2013	Mount Lemmon	Mount Lemmon Survey	·	2.2 km	MPC · JPL
538565	2016 EF_{225}	—	March 11, 2016	Haleakala	Pan-STARRS 1	KOR	1.1 km	MPC · JPL
538566	2016 EU_{225}	—	October 18, 2009	Mount Lemmon	Mount Lemmon Survey	·	1.5 km	MPC · JPL
538567	2016 EW_{225}	—	November 7, 2010	Mount Lemmon	Mount Lemmon Survey	·	1.1 km	MPC · JPL
538568	2016 EA_{226}	—	August 12, 2013	Haleakala	Pan-STARRS 1	·	1.3 km	MPC · JPL
538569	2016 EB_{226}	—	April 27, 2012	Haleakala	Pan-STARRS 1	·	1.2 km	MPC · JPL
538570	2016 EO_{226}	—	November 8, 2009	Mount Lemmon	Mount Lemmon Survey	·	1.9 km	MPC · JPL
538571	2016 EP_{226}	—	February 26, 2011	Mount Lemmon	Mount Lemmon Survey	·	1.6 km	MPC · JPL
538572	2016 EQ_{226}	—	April 7, 2007	Mount Lemmon	Mount Lemmon Survey	·	1.6 km	MPC · JPL
538573	2016 EU_{226}	—	September 4, 2007	Mount Lemmon	Mount Lemmon Survey	EOS	1.6 km	MPC · JPL
538574	2016 EW_{226}	—	March 13, 2007	Kitt Peak	Spacewatch	·	2.6 km	MPC · JPL
538575	2016 EA_{227}	—	February 10, 2011	Mount Lemmon	Mount Lemmon Survey	AGN	950 m	MPC · JPL
538576	2016 EH_{227}	—	June 18, 2013	Haleakala	Pan-STARRS 1	·	1.1 km	MPC · JPL
538577	2016 EQ_{227}	—	March 2, 2011	Kitt Peak	Spacewatch	AGN	1.3 km	MPC · JPL
538578	2016 EY_{227}	—	February 7, 2011	Mount Lemmon	Mount Lemmon Survey	·	1.6 km	MPC · JPL
538579	2016 EB_{228}	—	April 26, 2000	Kitt Peak	Spacewatch	·	2.8 km	MPC · JPL
538580	2016 EC_{228}	—	October 31, 2005	Kitt Peak	Spacewatch	·	1.2 km	MPC · JPL
538581	2016 EE_{228}	—	March 4, 2016	Haleakala	Pan-STARRS 1	AGN	900 m	MPC · JPL
538582	2016 EL_{228}	—	February 13, 2007	Mount Lemmon	Mount Lemmon Survey	·	1.5 km	MPC · JPL
538583	2016 EY_{228}	—	March 27, 2003	Kitt Peak	Spacewatch	·	1.5 km	MPC · JPL
538584	2016 EA_{229}	—	November 19, 2003	Kitt Peak	Spacewatch	·	1.2 km	MPC · JPL
538585	2016 EE_{230}	—	January 9, 2015	Haleakala	Pan-STARRS 1	·	1.4 km	MPC · JPL
538586	2016 EH_{230}	—	October 29, 2008	Kitt Peak	Spacewatch	·	2.9 km	MPC · JPL
538587	2016 EP_{230}	—	October 21, 2014	Catalina	CSS	·	1.4 km	MPC · JPL
538588	2016 EB_{231}	—	April 1, 2012	Mount Lemmon	Mount Lemmon Survey	·	1.2 km	MPC · JPL
538589	2016 EJ_{231}	—	October 14, 2013	Mount Lemmon	Mount Lemmon Survey	·	1.7 km	MPC · JPL
538590	2016 EP_{231}	—	November 26, 2014	Haleakala	Pan-STARRS 1	EUN	1 km	MPC · JPL
538591	2016 ET_{231}	—	November 11, 2006	Kitt Peak	Spacewatch	·	1.0 km	MPC · JPL
538592	2016 EK_{232}	—	May 9, 2011	Mount Lemmon	Mount Lemmon Survey	·	2.9 km	MPC · JPL
538593	2016 EJ_{233}	—	January 15, 2015	Mount Lemmon	Mount Lemmon Survey	·	2.8 km	MPC · JPL
538594	2016 ET_{233}	—	April 4, 2008	Kitt Peak	Spacewatch	·	1.1 km	MPC · JPL
538595	2016 EV_{233}	—	September 26, 2009	Kitt Peak	Spacewatch	·	1.6 km	MPC · JPL
538596	2016 EK_{234}	—	March 4, 2016	Haleakala	Pan-STARRS 1	·	2.8 km	MPC · JPL
538597	2016 EP_{234}	—	November 26, 2013	Haleakala	Pan-STARRS 1	EOS	1.7 km	MPC · JPL
538598	2016 EX_{234}	—	January 17, 2015	Haleakala	Pan-STARRS 1	·	1.8 km	MPC · JPL
538599	2016 EB_{235}	—	November 19, 2009	Kitt Peak	Spacewatch	·	1.8 km	MPC · JPL
538600	2016 EE_{235}	—	October 5, 2013	Kitt Peak	Spacewatch	EOS	1.9 km	MPC · JPL

== 538601–538700 ==
back to top

Designation			Discovery			Properties		Ref
Permanent	Provisional	Named after	Date	Site	Discoverer(s)	Category	Diam.	Ref
538601	2016 ET_{235}	—	February 3, 2012	Haleakala	Pan-STARRS 1	·	720 m	MPC · JPL
538602	2016 EA_{236}	—	November 16, 2014	Mount Lemmon	Mount Lemmon Survey	V	520 m	MPC · JPL
538603	2016 EE_{236}	—	April 15, 2012	Haleakala	Pan-STARRS 1	·	1.3 km	MPC · JPL
538604	2016 EG_{236}	—	January 23, 2015	Haleakala	Pan-STARRS 1	·	2.4 km	MPC · JPL
538605	2016 EP_{236}	—	December 14, 2010	Mount Lemmon	Mount Lemmon Survey	EUN	810 m	MPC · JPL
538606	2016 EU_{236}	—	August 26, 2012	Haleakala	Pan-STARRS 1	·	2.9 km	MPC · JPL
538607	2016 EW_{236}	—	November 18, 2014	Mount Lemmon	Mount Lemmon Survey	EUN	780 m	MPC · JPL
538608	2016 EA_{239}	—	December 10, 2014	Mount Lemmon	Mount Lemmon Survey	·	1.5 km	MPC · JPL
538609	2016 EJ_{239}	—	April 26, 2003	Kitt Peak	Spacewatch	·	1.1 km	MPC · JPL
538610	2016 EO_{239}	—	January 21, 2015	Haleakala	Pan-STARRS 1	·	2.4 km	MPC · JPL
538611	2016 EH_{240}	—	December 26, 2014	Haleakala	Pan-STARRS 1	·	2.6 km	MPC · JPL
538612	2016 EL_{240}	—	December 11, 2010	Mount Lemmon	Mount Lemmon Survey	·	1.4 km	MPC · JPL
538613	2016 EH_{241}	—	January 26, 2012	Mount Lemmon	Mount Lemmon Survey	·	840 m	MPC · JPL
538614	2016 ER_{241}	—	February 8, 2011	Mount Lemmon	Mount Lemmon Survey	AGN	790 m	MPC · JPL
538615	2016 ET_{241}	—	January 28, 2006	Mount Lemmon	Mount Lemmon Survey	·	1.7 km	MPC · JPL
538616	2016 EH_{242}	—	September 9, 2013	Haleakala	Pan-STARRS 1	·	1.5 km	MPC · JPL
538617	2016 EJ_{242}	—	December 14, 2007	Mount Lemmon	Mount Lemmon Survey	·	720 m	MPC · JPL
538618	2016 EO_{242}	—	November 26, 2014	Haleakala	Pan-STARRS 1	·	1.0 km	MPC · JPL
538619	2016 ED_{243}	—	March 10, 2016	Haleakala	Pan-STARRS 1	KOR	1.1 km	MPC · JPL
538620	2016 EE_{243}	—	October 10, 2008	Mount Lemmon	Mount Lemmon Survey	·	1.7 km	MPC · JPL
538621	2016 EL_{243}	—	January 19, 2012	Haleakala	Pan-STARRS 1	NYS	940 m	MPC · JPL
538622	2016 EG_{244}	—	September 29, 2005	Kitt Peak	Spacewatch	EUN	960 m	MPC · JPL
538623	2016 EH_{244}	—	October 9, 2007	Kitt Peak	Spacewatch	·	2.7 km	MPC · JPL
538624	2016 EJ_{244}	—	March 10, 2016	Haleakala	Pan-STARRS 1	·	790 m	MPC · JPL
538625	2016 EN_{244}	—	August 22, 2001	Kitt Peak	Spacewatch	MAR	800 m	MPC · JPL
538626	2016 EU_{244}	—	October 8, 2007	Kitt Peak	Spacewatch	·	2.6 km	MPC · JPL
538627	2016 EF_{245}	—	October 5, 2014	Mount Lemmon	Mount Lemmon Survey	EUN	820 m	MPC · JPL
538628	2016 EK_{245}	—	September 14, 2013	Haleakala	Pan-STARRS 1	·	3.6 km	MPC · JPL
538629	2016 EU_{245}	—	August 29, 2005	Kitt Peak	Spacewatch	·	1.1 km	MPC · JPL
538630	2016 ED_{246}	—	September 17, 2009	Mount Lemmon	Mount Lemmon Survey	·	1.7 km	MPC · JPL
538631	2016 EH_{246}	—	October 17, 2010	Mount Lemmon	Mount Lemmon Survey	·	920 m	MPC · JPL
538632	2016 EK_{246}	—	October 12, 2013	Kitt Peak	Spacewatch	EOS	2.0 km	MPC · JPL
538633	2016 EJ_{247}	—	October 31, 2014	Kitt Peak	Spacewatch	·	490 m	MPC · JPL
538634	2016 ET_{247}	—	January 20, 2015	Haleakala	Pan-STARRS 1	·	2.5 km	MPC · JPL
538635	2016 ED_{248}	—	October 9, 2013	Kitt Peak	Spacewatch	EOS	1.6 km	MPC · JPL
538636	2016 EF_{248}	—	November 17, 2014	Kitt Peak	Spacewatch	HNS	830 m	MPC · JPL
538637	2016 EQ_{248}	—	November 21, 2014	Haleakala	Pan-STARRS 1	·	1.2 km	MPC · JPL
538638	2016 EV_{248}	—	June 30, 2013	Haleakala	Pan-STARRS 1	MAR	1.4 km	MPC · JPL
538639	2016 EW_{248}	—	November 16, 2006	Mount Lemmon	Mount Lemmon Survey	·	1.8 km	MPC · JPL
538640	2016 EC_{249}	—	January 16, 2015	Haleakala	Pan-STARRS 1	·	2.1 km	MPC · JPL
538641	2016 EP_{249}	—	March 11, 2016	Haleakala	Pan-STARRS 1	V	560 m	MPC · JPL
538642	2016 EV_{249}	—	March 5, 2016	Haleakala	Pan-STARRS 1	·	680 m	MPC · JPL
538643	2016 EX_{249}	—	March 3, 2016	Haleakala	Pan-STARRS 1	·	2.5 km	MPC · JPL
538644	2016 FA_{4}	—	March 18, 2016	Haleakala	Pan-STARRS 1	APO	460 m	MPC · JPL
538645	2016 FG_{4}	—	October 30, 2010	Mount Lemmon	Mount Lemmon Survey	·	1.6 km	MPC · JPL
538646	2016 FU_{4}	—	March 10, 2008	Kitt Peak	Spacewatch	·	1.4 km	MPC · JPL
538647	2016 FE_{5}	—	January 10, 2007	Kitt Peak	Spacewatch	·	1.3 km	MPC · JPL
538648	2016 FS_{6}	—	March 17, 2016	Mount Lemmon	Mount Lemmon Survey	APO	450 m	MPC · JPL
538649	2016 FB_{7}	—	April 20, 2012	Siding Spring	SSS	·	1.5 km	MPC · JPL
538650	2016 FO_{7}	—	April 16, 2007	Catalina	CSS	·	2.3 km	MPC · JPL
538651	2016 FQ_{7}	—	November 26, 2014	Haleakala	Pan-STARRS 1	·	930 m	MPC · JPL
538652	2016 FW_{7}	—	January 31, 2006	Kitt Peak	Spacewatch	·	420 m	MPC · JPL
538653	2016 FY_{7}	—	October 23, 2005	Catalina	CSS	·	2.4 km	MPC · JPL
538654	2016 FM_{8}	—	December 21, 2006	Kitt Peak	Spacewatch	·	1.4 km	MPC · JPL
538655	2016 FS_{8}	—	October 29, 2005	Mount Lemmon	Mount Lemmon Survey	EUN	1.1 km	MPC · JPL
538656	2016 FX_{11}	—	September 10, 2007	Kitt Peak	Spacewatch	·	740 m	MPC · JPL
538657	2016 FG_{12}	—	September 11, 2004	Kitt Peak	Spacewatch	·	690 m	MPC · JPL
538658	2016 FX_{15}	—	September 19, 2014	Haleakala	Pan-STARRS 1	(2076)	790 m	MPC · JPL
538659	2016 FL_{16}	—	April 4, 2008	Mount Lemmon	Mount Lemmon Survey	·	1.2 km	MPC · JPL
538660	2016 FD_{17}	—	February 23, 2012	Catalina	CSS	PHO	880 m	MPC · JPL
538661	2016 FK_{17}	—	July 6, 2013	Haleakala	Pan-STARRS 1	·	660 m	MPC · JPL
538662	2016 FA_{20}	—	March 1, 2009	Mount Lemmon	Mount Lemmon Survey	(2076)	820 m	MPC · JPL
538663	2016 FM_{20}	—	September 28, 2003	Kitt Peak	Spacewatch	·	990 m	MPC · JPL
538664	2016 FR_{20}	—	October 21, 2014	Mount Lemmon	Mount Lemmon Survey	·	690 m	MPC · JPL
538665	2016 FK_{21}	—	March 25, 2011	Catalina	CSS	·	2.2 km	MPC · JPL
538666	2016 FP_{21}	—	February 1, 2012	Mount Lemmon	Mount Lemmon Survey	·	800 m	MPC · JPL
538667	2016 FV_{21}	—	February 7, 2011	Mount Lemmon	Mount Lemmon Survey	·	1.4 km	MPC · JPL
538668	2016 FN_{22}	—	September 10, 2007	Mount Lemmon	Mount Lemmon Survey	·	2.4 km	MPC · JPL
538669	2016 FO_{22}	—	January 10, 2008	Kitt Peak	Spacewatch	MAS	660 m	MPC · JPL
538670	2016 FH_{28}	—	October 29, 2005	Catalina	CSS	·	1.8 km	MPC · JPL
538671	2016 FZ_{28}	—	August 29, 2005	Kitt Peak	Spacewatch	·	1.1 km	MPC · JPL
538672	2016 FG_{29}	—	June 9, 2011	Mount Lemmon	Mount Lemmon Survey	·	2.4 km	MPC · JPL
538673	2016 FM_{33}	—	October 3, 1997	Kitt Peak	Spacewatch	·	1.1 km	MPC · JPL
538674	2016 FB_{34}	—	November 25, 2005	Kitt Peak	Spacewatch	·	740 m	MPC · JPL
538675	2016 FX_{36}	—	March 10, 2007	Kitt Peak	Spacewatch	·	1.3 km	MPC · JPL
538676	2016 FU_{39}	—	September 29, 2008	Mount Lemmon	Mount Lemmon Survey	EOS	1.4 km	MPC · JPL
538677	2016 FR_{40}	—	January 13, 2005	Catalina	CSS	·	1.1 km	MPC · JPL
538678	2016 FD_{42}	—	October 26, 2011	Haleakala	Pan-STARRS 1	·	610 m	MPC · JPL
538679	2016 FP_{43}	—	March 15, 2007	Kitt Peak	Spacewatch	·	2.3 km	MPC · JPL
538680	2016 FC_{44}	—	November 14, 2007	Kitt Peak	Spacewatch	MAS	540 m	MPC · JPL
538681	2016 FY_{48}	—	February 20, 2006	Mount Lemmon	Mount Lemmon Survey	·	600 m	MPC · JPL
538682	2016 FE_{49}	—	December 4, 2008	Mount Lemmon	Mount Lemmon Survey	·	520 m	MPC · JPL
538683	2016 FF_{49}	—	December 25, 2005	Kitt Peak	Spacewatch	PAD	1.6 km	MPC · JPL
538684	2016 FJ_{52}	—	October 24, 2009	Kitt Peak	Spacewatch	·	1.7 km	MPC · JPL
538685	2016 FG_{54}	—	January 18, 2009	Kitt Peak	Spacewatch	·	570 m	MPC · JPL
538686	2016 FO_{55}	—	April 11, 2005	Kitt Peak	Spacewatch	·	1.1 km	MPC · JPL
538687	2016 FH_{56}	—	February 16, 2010	Mount Lemmon	Mount Lemmon Survey	·	3.2 km	MPC · JPL
538688	2016 FG_{57}	—	January 18, 2009	Kitt Peak	Spacewatch	(883)	770 m	MPC · JPL
538689	2016 FN_{57}	—	November 10, 2005	Kitt Peak	Spacewatch	·	1.9 km	MPC · JPL
538690	2016 FP_{59}	—	March 28, 2016	Cerro Tololo	DECam	cubewano (cold)	232 km	MPC · JPL
538691	2016 FW_{59}	—	March 29, 2016	Cerro Tololo	DECam	cubewano (hot)	282 km	MPC · JPL
538692	2016 FX_{61}	—	March 16, 2016	Haleakala	Pan-STARRS 1	·	570 m	MPC · JPL
538693	2016 FN_{62}	—	March 18, 2016	Haleakala	Pan-STARRS 1	·	3.3 km	MPC · JPL
538694	2016 FS_{62}	—	October 21, 2008	Mount Lemmon	Mount Lemmon Survey	·	2.1 km	MPC · JPL
538695	2016 FG_{63}	—	November 3, 2008	Mount Lemmon	Mount Lemmon Survey	EOS	1.5 km	MPC · JPL
538696	2016 FO_{63}	—	November 25, 2005	Mount Lemmon	Mount Lemmon Survey	·	2.2 km	MPC · JPL
538697	2016 FW_{63}	—	March 25, 2007	Mount Lemmon	Mount Lemmon Survey	·	1.7 km	MPC · JPL
538698	2016 FC_{64}	—	December 2, 2008	Mount Lemmon	Mount Lemmon Survey	·	3.2 km	MPC · JPL
538699	2016 FD_{64}	—	November 29, 2014	Haleakala	Pan-STARRS 1	·	1.5 km	MPC · JPL
538700	2016 FG_{64}	—	January 21, 2015	Mount Lemmon	Mount Lemmon Survey	·	2.1 km	MPC · JPL

== 538701–538800 ==
back to top

Designation			Discovery			Properties		Ref
Permanent	Provisional	Named after	Date	Site	Discoverer(s)	Category	Diam.	Ref
538701	2016 FJ_{64}	—	March 17, 2016	Haleakala	Pan-STARRS 1	·	1.3 km	MPC · JPL
538702	2016 FM_{64}	—	December 24, 2006	Kitt Peak	Spacewatch	(5)	1.0 km	MPC · JPL
538703	2016 FN_{64}	—	November 17, 2004	Campo Imperatore	CINEOS	HOF	2.5 km	MPC · JPL
538704	2016 FO_{64}	—	March 26, 2007	Mount Lemmon	Mount Lemmon Survey	·	1.5 km	MPC · JPL
538705	2016 FY_{64}	—	August 25, 2012	Kitt Peak	Spacewatch	·	2.5 km	MPC · JPL
538706	2016 FA_{65}	—	April 29, 2011	Mount Lemmon	Mount Lemmon Survey	EOS	1.4 km	MPC · JPL
538707	2016 FD_{65}	—	October 5, 2013	Haleakala	Pan-STARRS 1	(16286)	1.6 km	MPC · JPL
538708	2016 FG_{65}	—	August 26, 2012	Haleakala	Pan-STARRS 1	·	2.1 km	MPC · JPL
538709	2016 FT_{65}	—	January 17, 2015	Haleakala	Pan-STARRS 1	·	2.4 km	MPC · JPL
538710	2016 FU_{65}	—	November 5, 2010	Mount Lemmon	Mount Lemmon Survey	EUN	1.1 km	MPC · JPL
538711	2016 FZ_{65}	—	November 26, 2009	Kitt Peak	Spacewatch	·	1.8 km	MPC · JPL
538712	2016 FE_{66}	—	November 29, 2013	Haleakala	Pan-STARRS 1	·	2.8 km	MPC · JPL
538713	2016 FM_{66}	—	December 17, 2014	Haleakala	Pan-STARRS 1	·	1.6 km	MPC · JPL
538714	2016 FX_{66}	—	November 29, 2014	Mount Lemmon	Mount Lemmon Survey	·	2.0 km	MPC · JPL
538715	2016 FA_{67}	—	October 18, 2014	Mount Lemmon	Mount Lemmon Survey	·	1.6 km	MPC · JPL
538716	2016 FG_{67}	—	November 16, 2009	Kitt Peak	Spacewatch	·	2.1 km	MPC · JPL
538717	2016 FO_{67}	—	September 25, 2013	Kitt Peak	Spacewatch	·	1.7 km	MPC · JPL
538718	2016 FP_{67}	—	December 10, 2014	Haleakala	Pan-STARRS 1	·	1.0 km	MPC · JPL
538719	2016 FW_{67}	—	April 30, 2011	Mount Lemmon	Mount Lemmon Survey	·	2.4 km	MPC · JPL
538720	2016 FB_{68}	—	July 14, 2013	Haleakala	Pan-STARRS 1	PHO	810 m	MPC · JPL
538721	2016 FG_{68}	—	May 21, 2012	Mount Lemmon	Mount Lemmon Survey	ADE	1.7 km	MPC · JPL
538722	2016 FM_{68}	—	March 31, 2016	Haleakala	Pan-STARRS 1	·	600 m	MPC · JPL
538723	2016 GB	—	February 9, 2016	Mount Lemmon	Mount Lemmon Survey	·	1.0 km	MPC · JPL
538724	2016 GA_{5}	—	March 8, 2008	Kitt Peak	Spacewatch	·	980 m	MPC · JPL
538725	2016 GE_{5}	—	August 28, 2003	Palomar	NEAT	·	710 m	MPC · JPL
538726	2016 GE_{6}	—	February 14, 2010	Mount Lemmon	Mount Lemmon Survey	·	2.8 km	MPC · JPL
538727	2016 GV_{7}	—	December 1, 2005	Kitt Peak	Spacewatch	WIT	1.1 km	MPC · JPL
538728	2016 GJ_{8}	—	September 11, 2007	Mount Lemmon	Mount Lemmon Survey	·	550 m	MPC · JPL
538729	2016 GB_{9}	—	March 25, 2006	Kitt Peak	Spacewatch	·	590 m	MPC · JPL
538730	2016 GO_{9}	—	October 7, 2013	Mount Lemmon	Mount Lemmon Survey	EOS	2.2 km	MPC · JPL
538731	2016 GZ_{9}	—	November 1, 1999	Kitt Peak	Spacewatch	KOR	1.2 km	MPC · JPL
538732	2016 GJ_{10}	—	September 12, 2007	Mount Lemmon	Mount Lemmon Survey	EOS	1.9 km	MPC · JPL
538733	2016 GS_{11}	—	September 3, 2013	Haleakala	Pan-STARRS 1	·	2.2 km	MPC · JPL
538734	2016 GK_{12}	—	October 21, 2007	Mount Lemmon	Mount Lemmon Survey	·	3.5 km	MPC · JPL
538735	2016 GC_{13}	—	March 13, 2007	Mount Lemmon	Mount Lemmon Survey	·	1.6 km	MPC · JPL
538736	2016 GT_{13}	—	May 3, 2011	Mount Lemmon	Mount Lemmon Survey	·	2.6 km	MPC · JPL
538737	2016 GK_{14}	—	April 12, 2011	Mount Lemmon	Mount Lemmon Survey	·	2.5 km	MPC · JPL
538738	2016 GZ_{17}	—	January 13, 2005	Kitt Peak	Spacewatch	·	720 m	MPC · JPL
538739	2016 GD_{18}	—	March 5, 2008	Kitt Peak	Spacewatch	·	820 m	MPC · JPL
538740	2016 GW_{19}	—	March 11, 2005	Mount Lemmon	Mount Lemmon Survey	THM	2.2 km	MPC · JPL
538741	2016 GW_{20}	—	February 27, 2012	Haleakala	Pan-STARRS 1	(5)	1.1 km	MPC · JPL
538742	2016 GX_{20}	—	March 28, 2012	Mount Lemmon	Mount Lemmon Survey	·	830 m	MPC · JPL
538743	2016 GA_{21}	—	August 8, 1999	Kitt Peak	Spacewatch	·	730 m	MPC · JPL
538744	2016 GF_{22}	—	October 17, 2010	Mount Lemmon	Mount Lemmon Survey	·	840 m	MPC · JPL
538745	2016 GB_{23}	—	July 28, 2008	Mount Lemmon	Mount Lemmon Survey	BRA	1.6 km	MPC · JPL
538746	2016 GD_{24}	—	March 12, 2016	Haleakala	Pan-STARRS 1	·	980 m	MPC · JPL
538747	2016 GF_{24}	—	August 25, 2004	Kitt Peak	Spacewatch	·	1.5 km	MPC · JPL
538748	2016 GY_{24}	—	August 27, 2001	Palomar	NEAT	·	3.2 km	MPC · JPL
538749	2016 GN_{26}	—	March 3, 2009	Kitt Peak	Spacewatch	·	640 m	MPC · JPL
538750	2016 GX_{28}	—	September 22, 2008	Kitt Peak	Spacewatch	KOR	1.5 km	MPC · JPL
538751	2016 GO_{30}	—	March 16, 2012	Kitt Peak	Spacewatch	·	1.1 km	MPC · JPL
538752	2016 GR_{30}	—	September 15, 2009	Kitt Peak	Spacewatch	·	1.5 km	MPC · JPL
538753	2016 GN_{34}	—	September 10, 2013	Haleakala	Pan-STARRS 1	·	1.6 km	MPC · JPL
538754	2016 GG_{35}	—	April 5, 2010	WISE	WISE	·	5.2 km	MPC · JPL
538755	2016 GH_{35}	—	October 14, 2004	Kitt Peak	Spacewatch	·	2.6 km	MPC · JPL
538756	2016 GX_{37}	—	December 30, 2007	Mount Lemmon	Mount Lemmon Survey	MAS	610 m	MPC · JPL
538757	2016 GH_{38}	—	April 27, 2012	Haleakala	Pan-STARRS 1	·	1.4 km	MPC · JPL
538758	2016 GG_{41}	—	March 11, 2005	Mount Lemmon	Mount Lemmon Survey	V	590 m	MPC · JPL
538759	2016 GC_{42}	—	November 18, 2008	Kitt Peak	Spacewatch	·	1.3 km	MPC · JPL
538760	2016 GV_{42}	—	October 1, 2013	Kitt Peak	Spacewatch	·	1.9 km	MPC · JPL
538761	2016 GD_{43}	—	December 27, 2014	Haleakala	Pan-STARRS 1	EOS	1.7 km	MPC · JPL
538762	2016 GR_{44}	—	February 16, 2010	Mount Lemmon	Mount Lemmon Survey	·	1.7 km	MPC · JPL
538763	2016 GH_{49}	—	October 26, 2008	Mount Lemmon	Mount Lemmon Survey	·	2.5 km	MPC · JPL
538764	2016 GC_{51}	—	December 30, 2007	Kitt Peak	Spacewatch	·	1.0 km	MPC · JPL
538765	2016 GG_{51}	—	September 7, 2008	Mount Lemmon	Mount Lemmon Survey	KOR	1.1 km	MPC · JPL
538766	2016 GG_{53}	—	March 4, 2016	Haleakala	Pan-STARRS 1	MRX	920 m	MPC · JPL
538767	2016 GV_{53}	—	October 15, 2014	Kitt Peak	Spacewatch	·	890 m	MPC · JPL
538768	2016 GF_{55}	—	October 1, 2013	Mount Lemmon	Mount Lemmon Survey	·	1.4 km	MPC · JPL
538769	2016 GO_{56}	—	October 3, 2013	Kitt Peak	Spacewatch	·	2.3 km	MPC · JPL
538770	2016 GW_{56}	—	October 8, 2010	Kitt Peak	Spacewatch	·	580 m	MPC · JPL
538771	2016 GD_{57}	—	December 24, 2005	Kitt Peak	Spacewatch	·	1.5 km	MPC · JPL
538772	2016 GZ_{59}	—	September 20, 2008	Mount Lemmon	Mount Lemmon Survey	KOR	1.4 km	MPC · JPL
538773	2016 GW_{60}	—	September 16, 2009	Kitt Peak	Spacewatch	·	1.4 km	MPC · JPL
538774	2016 GQ_{62}	—	January 2, 2011	Mount Lemmon	Mount Lemmon Survey	·	1.0 km	MPC · JPL
538775	2016 GC_{63}	—	October 18, 2014	Mount Lemmon	Mount Lemmon Survey	·	870 m	MPC · JPL
538776	2016 GG_{63}	—	December 24, 2014	Mount Lemmon	Mount Lemmon Survey	·	1.5 km	MPC · JPL
538777	2016 GS_{66}	—	September 11, 2007	Mount Lemmon	Mount Lemmon Survey	·	760 m	MPC · JPL
538778	2016 GY_{67}	—	March 15, 2007	Mount Lemmon	Mount Lemmon Survey	GEF	1.0 km	MPC · JPL
538779	2016 GM_{74}	—	March 11, 2016	Haleakala	Pan-STARRS 1	·	520 m	MPC · JPL
538780	2016 GQ_{75}	—	January 13, 2015	Haleakala	Pan-STARRS 1	·	1.6 km	MPC · JPL
538781	2016 GR_{77}	—	December 21, 2014	Haleakala	Pan-STARRS 1	·	1.5 km	MPC · JPL
538782	2016 GJ_{78}	—	March 3, 2006	Kitt Peak	Spacewatch	KOR	1.3 km	MPC · JPL
538783	2016 GW_{78}	—	March 10, 2005	Mount Lemmon	Mount Lemmon Survey	·	2.5 km	MPC · JPL
538784	2016 GC_{84}	—	March 10, 2007	Mount Lemmon	Mount Lemmon Survey	·	2.1 km	MPC · JPL
538785	2016 GG_{84}	—	October 2, 1997	Caussols	ODAS	·	1.2 km	MPC · JPL
538786	2016 GV_{88}	—	January 7, 2010	Mount Lemmon	Mount Lemmon Survey	·	2.1 km	MPC · JPL
538787	2016 GY_{92}	—	September 17, 2013	Mount Lemmon	Mount Lemmon Survey	BRA	1.3 km	MPC · JPL
538788	2016 GC_{96}	—	January 18, 2009	Kitt Peak	Spacewatch	·	460 m	MPC · JPL
538789	2016 GB_{97}	—	March 5, 2002	Kitt Peak	Spacewatch	·	920 m	MPC · JPL
538790	2016 GE_{99}	—	December 14, 2004	Kitt Peak	Spacewatch	·	1.9 km	MPC · JPL
538791	2016 GC_{100}	—	September 2, 2008	Kitt Peak	Spacewatch	AGN	1.2 km	MPC · JPL
538792	2016 GW_{101}	—	March 31, 2008	Kitt Peak	Spacewatch	·	1.2 km	MPC · JPL
538793	2016 GE_{106}	—	September 4, 2013	Mount Lemmon	Mount Lemmon Survey	·	2.1 km	MPC · JPL
538794	2016 GY_{106}	—	October 13, 2007	Mount Lemmon	Mount Lemmon Survey	·	2.2 km	MPC · JPL
538795	2016 GH_{109}	—	April 15, 1994	Kitt Peak	Spacewatch	·	2.8 km	MPC · JPL
538796	2016 GE_{110}	—	May 3, 2006	Kitt Peak	Spacewatch	·	1.3 km	MPC · JPL
538797	2016 GE_{111}	—	March 6, 2016	Haleakala	Pan-STARRS 1	V	460 m	MPC · JPL
538798	2016 GM_{112}	—	October 2, 2010	Kitt Peak	Spacewatch	·	900 m	MPC · JPL
538799	2016 GU_{113}	—	May 14, 2005	Mount Lemmon	Mount Lemmon Survey	THM	2.6 km	MPC · JPL
538800	2016 GW_{113}	—	January 15, 2005	Catalina	CSS	·	2.8 km	MPC · JPL

== 538801–538900 ==
back to top

Designation			Discovery			Properties		Ref
Permanent	Provisional	Named after	Date	Site	Discoverer(s)	Category	Diam.	Ref
538801	2016 GY_{115}	—	November 5, 2007	Kitt Peak	Spacewatch	·	3.4 km	MPC · JPL
538802	2016 GT_{118}	—	September 6, 1999	Kitt Peak	Spacewatch	PAD	1.4 km	MPC · JPL
538803	2016 GZ_{123}	—	March 28, 2009	Catalina	CSS	·	800 m	MPC · JPL
538804	2016 GJ_{124}	—	January 19, 2015	Haleakala	Pan-STARRS 1	MAR	930 m	MPC · JPL
538805	2016 GV_{125}	—	March 12, 2016	Haleakala	Pan-STARRS 1	·	1.6 km	MPC · JPL
538806	2016 GF_{129}	—	July 18, 2013	Haleakala	Pan-STARRS 1	EOS	2.2 km	MPC · JPL
538807	2016 GO_{129}	—	July 14, 2013	Haleakala	Pan-STARRS 1	·	2.9 km	MPC · JPL
538808	2016 GR_{129}	—	March 17, 2002	Kitt Peak	Spacewatch	·	2.0 km	MPC · JPL
538809	2016 GH_{130}	—	October 28, 2014	Mount Lemmon	Mount Lemmon Survey	·	2.1 km	MPC · JPL
538810	2016 GT_{133}	—	October 22, 2006	Kitt Peak	Spacewatch	·	1.2 km	MPC · JPL
538811	2016 GM_{137}	—	February 14, 2005	Kitt Peak	Spacewatch	·	2.1 km	MPC · JPL
538812	2016 GA_{138}	—	January 31, 2006	Kitt Peak	Spacewatch	·	2.6 km	MPC · JPL
538813	2016 GK_{142}	—	June 17, 2005	Siding Spring	SSS	·	2.4 km	MPC · JPL
538814	2016 GS_{144}	—	October 13, 2010	Mount Lemmon	Mount Lemmon Survey	EUN	710 m	MPC · JPL
538815	2016 GC_{145}	—	March 27, 2012	Haleakala	Pan-STARRS 1	RAF	880 m	MPC · JPL
538816	2016 GD_{145}	—	October 24, 2008	Mount Lemmon	Mount Lemmon Survey	EOS	2.4 km	MPC · JPL
538817	2016 GE_{145}	—	March 12, 2007	Kitt Peak	Spacewatch	·	2.5 km	MPC · JPL
538818	2016 GZ_{146}	—	March 8, 2005	Mount Lemmon	Mount Lemmon Survey	·	940 m	MPC · JPL
538819	2016 GV_{153}	—	June 1, 2014	Haleakala	Pan-STARRS 1	H	510 m	MPC · JPL
538820	2016 GU_{154}	—	April 11, 2008	Catalina	CSS	·	1.4 km	MPC · JPL
538821	2016 GH_{158}	—	March 2, 2011	Kitt Peak	Spacewatch	·	2.5 km	MPC · JPL
538822	2016 GH_{159}	—	August 31, 2014	Haleakala	Pan-STARRS 1	EUN	920 m	MPC · JPL
538823	2016 GF_{165}	—	April 28, 2009	Mount Lemmon	Mount Lemmon Survey	·	570 m	MPC · JPL
538824	2016 GE_{166}	—	December 10, 2009	Mount Lemmon	Mount Lemmon Survey	AGN	1.2 km	MPC · JPL
538825	2016 GH_{168}	—	February 25, 2006	Kitt Peak	Spacewatch	·	1.9 km	MPC · JPL
538826	2016 GZ_{173}	—	March 27, 2011	Mount Lemmon	Mount Lemmon Survey	HOF	2.6 km	MPC · JPL
538827	2016 GC_{177}	—	May 12, 2012	Mount Lemmon	Mount Lemmon Survey	(5)	960 m	MPC · JPL
538828	2016 GE_{186}	—	March 31, 2016	Haleakala	Pan-STARRS 1	·	1.5 km	MPC · JPL
538829	2016 GK_{186}	—	November 9, 2009	Mount Lemmon	Mount Lemmon Survey	·	1.9 km	MPC · JPL
538830	2016 GY_{189}	—	September 12, 2007	Mount Lemmon	Mount Lemmon Survey	·	3.0 km	MPC · JPL
538831	2016 GA_{190}	—	November 6, 2013	Haleakala	Pan-STARRS 1	EOS	1.9 km	MPC · JPL
538832	2016 GK_{191}	—	May 21, 2012	Haleakala	Pan-STARRS 1	·	1.0 km	MPC · JPL
538833	2016 GV_{191}	—	May 24, 2006	Mount Lemmon	Mount Lemmon Survey	·	800 m	MPC · JPL
538834	2016 GW_{192}	—	April 4, 2005	Catalina	CSS	·	830 m	MPC · JPL
538835	2016 GL_{193}	—	March 4, 2012	Mount Lemmon	Mount Lemmon Survey	·	990 m	MPC · JPL
538836	2016 GL_{203}	—	April 8, 2006	Kitt Peak	Spacewatch	·	810 m	MPC · JPL
538837	2016 GP_{204}	—	May 12, 2010	Mount Lemmon	Mount Lemmon Survey	·	3.2 km	MPC · JPL
538838	2016 GT_{207}	—	March 29, 2010	WISE	WISE	·	3.8 km	MPC · JPL
538839	2016 GX_{208}	—	September 12, 2007	Mount Lemmon	Mount Lemmon Survey	·	2.4 km	MPC · JPL
538840	2016 GZ_{210}	—	September 10, 2005	Anderson Mesa	LONEOS	·	1.5 km	MPC · JPL
538841	2016 GF_{212}	—	September 12, 2007	Kitt Peak	Spacewatch	EOS	1.8 km	MPC · JPL
538842	2016 GJ_{214}	—	April 6, 2005	Mount Lemmon	Mount Lemmon Survey	·	3.1 km	MPC · JPL
538843	2016 GA_{217}	—	November 25, 2006	Kitt Peak	Spacewatch	·	1.2 km	MPC · JPL
538844	2016 GR_{217}	—	March 7, 2003	Anderson Mesa	LONEOS	·	1.8 km	MPC · JPL
538845	2016 GH_{220}	—	March 18, 2009	Kitt Peak	Spacewatch	·	670 m	MPC · JPL
538846	2016 GO_{225}	—	September 3, 2013	Haleakala	Pan-STARRS 1	·	1.6 km	MPC · JPL
538847	2016 GK_{230}	—	April 9, 2002	Kitt Peak	Spacewatch	·	520 m	MPC · JPL
538848	2016 GE_{236}	—	January 23, 2015	Haleakala	Pan-STARRS 1	·	2.8 km	MPC · JPL
538849	2016 GU_{236}	—	September 1, 2013	Mount Lemmon	Mount Lemmon Survey	·	580 m	MPC · JPL
538850	2016 GF_{239}	—	February 9, 2005	Mount Lemmon	Mount Lemmon Survey	·	2.2 km	MPC · JPL
538851	2016 GL_{241}	—	February 17, 2015	Haleakala	Pan-STARRS 1	·	2.4 km	MPC · JPL
538852	2016 GU_{245}	—	June 14, 2012	Mount Lemmon	Mount Lemmon Survey	·	1.4 km	MPC · JPL
538853	2016 GM_{246}	—	October 4, 2007	Kitt Peak	Spacewatch	·	3.4 km	MPC · JPL
538854	2016 GE_{248}	—	September 30, 1995	Kitt Peak	Spacewatch	·	1.1 km	MPC · JPL
538855	2016 GU_{248}	—	October 21, 2003	Kitt Peak	Spacewatch	·	1.2 km	MPC · JPL
538856	2016 GA_{249}	—	September 14, 2013	Kitt Peak	Spacewatch	·	1.5 km	MPC · JPL
538857	2016 GD_{251}	—	March 1, 2011	Mount Lemmon	Mount Lemmon Survey	AGN	1.0 km	MPC · JPL
538858	2016 GK_{251}	—	October 11, 2007	Catalina	CSS	·	2.2 km	MPC · JPL
538859	2016 GO_{255}	—	January 25, 2010	WISE	WISE	·	3.7 km	MPC · JPL
538860	2016 GZ_{256}	—	May 28, 2011	Mount Lemmon	Mount Lemmon Survey	·	1.4 km	MPC · JPL
538861	2016 GB_{257}	—	March 17, 2005	Mount Lemmon	Mount Lemmon Survey	·	800 m	MPC · JPL
538862	2016 GF_{257}	—	April 28, 2012	Mount Lemmon	Mount Lemmon Survey	·	1.1 km	MPC · JPL
538863	2016 GG_{257}	—	February 8, 2011	Mount Lemmon	Mount Lemmon Survey	·	1.0 km	MPC · JPL
538864	2016 GN_{257}	—	May 21, 2012	Haleakala	Pan-STARRS 1	·	1.1 km	MPC · JPL
538865	2016 GP_{257}	—	December 4, 2008	Kitt Peak	Spacewatch	·	2.0 km	MPC · JPL
538866	2016 GT_{257}	—	April 5, 2011	Kitt Peak	Spacewatch	·	2.3 km	MPC · JPL
538867	2016 GU_{257}	—	January 10, 2007	Mount Lemmon	Mount Lemmon Survey	·	1.3 km	MPC · JPL
538868	2016 GW_{257}	—	February 10, 2011	Mount Lemmon	Mount Lemmon Survey	·	1.4 km	MPC · JPL
538869	2016 GY_{257}	—	December 13, 2010	Kitt Peak	Spacewatch	·	1.3 km	MPC · JPL
538870	2016 GA_{258}	—	April 10, 2016	Haleakala	Pan-STARRS 1	EUN	950 m	MPC · JPL
538871	2016 GB_{258}	—	April 14, 2016	Haleakala	Pan-STARRS 1	·	1.1 km	MPC · JPL
538872	2016 GG_{258}	—	August 29, 2009	Kitt Peak	Spacewatch	·	2.4 km	MPC · JPL
538873	2016 GP_{258}	—	October 20, 2007	Mount Lemmon	Mount Lemmon Survey	·	2.4 km	MPC · JPL
538874	2016 GR_{258}	—	September 29, 1995	Kitt Peak	Spacewatch	·	1.4 km	MPC · JPL
538875	2016 GS_{258}	—	April 10, 2016	Haleakala	Pan-STARRS 1	·	2.7 km	MPC · JPL
538876	2016 GT_{258}	—	November 10, 2013	Mount Lemmon	Mount Lemmon Survey	·	1.8 km	MPC · JPL
538877	2016 GW_{258}	—	November 2, 2007	Mount Lemmon	Mount Lemmon Survey	·	2.8 km	MPC · JPL
538878	2016 GX_{258}	—	October 12, 2007	Mount Lemmon	Mount Lemmon Survey	·	2.8 km	MPC · JPL
538879	2016 GY_{258}	—	December 25, 2013	Kitt Peak	Spacewatch	EOS	1.7 km	MPC · JPL
538880	2016 GA_{259}	—	February 10, 2007	Mount Lemmon	Mount Lemmon Survey	·	1.0 km	MPC · JPL
538881	2016 GJ_{259}	—	January 24, 2015	Haleakala	Pan-STARRS 1	·	1.7 km	MPC · JPL
538882	2016 GQ_{259}	—	October 15, 2013	Mount Lemmon	Mount Lemmon Survey	EOS	2.1 km	MPC · JPL
538883	2016 GY_{259}	—	April 5, 2016	Haleakala	Pan-STARRS 1	·	1.4 km	MPC · JPL
538884	2016 GC_{260}	—	October 6, 2012	Haleakala	Pan-STARRS 1	·	3.1 km	MPC · JPL
538885	2016 GD_{260}	—	March 2, 2011	Mount Lemmon	Mount Lemmon Survey	AGN	1.3 km	MPC · JPL
538886	2016 GE_{260}	—	November 8, 2013	Catalina	CSS	·	1.5 km	MPC · JPL
538887	2016 GG_{260}	—	April 14, 2007	Mount Lemmon	Mount Lemmon Survey	·	1.6 km	MPC · JPL
538888	2016 GK_{260}	—	September 29, 2008	Mount Lemmon	Mount Lemmon Survey	EOS	1.7 km	MPC · JPL
538889	2016 GT_{260}	—	November 1, 2008	Mount Lemmon	Mount Lemmon Survey	EOS	2.0 km	MPC · JPL
538890	2016 GY_{260}	—	December 25, 2005	Mount Lemmon	Mount Lemmon Survey	·	1.6 km	MPC · JPL
538891	2016 GO_{261}	—	August 13, 2012	Haleakala	Pan-STARRS 1	·	2.7 km	MPC · JPL
538892	2016 GR_{261}	—	June 5, 2011	Mount Lemmon	Mount Lemmon Survey	·	2.3 km	MPC · JPL
538893	2016 GW_{261}	—	November 12, 2013	Kitt Peak	Spacewatch	EOS	1.9 km	MPC · JPL
538894	2016 GM_{262}	—	March 29, 2012	Kitt Peak	Spacewatch	MAR	810 m	MPC · JPL
538895	2016 GZ_{262}	—	November 13, 2007	Kitt Peak	Spacewatch	·	2.6 km	MPC · JPL
538896	2016 GD_{263}	—	April 6, 2008	Kitt Peak	Spacewatch	·	720 m	MPC · JPL
538897	2016 GF_{263}	—	October 23, 2012	Catalina	CSS	T_{j} (2.99)	3.3 km	MPC · JPL
538898	2016 GJ_{263}	—	March 10, 2011	Mount Lemmon	Mount Lemmon Survey	HNS	1.1 km	MPC · JPL
538899	2016 GO_{263}	—	October 10, 2007	Kitt Peak	Spacewatch	·	2.5 km	MPC · JPL
538900	2016 GR_{263}	—	November 27, 2013	Haleakala	Pan-STARRS 1	·	1.7 km	MPC · JPL

== 538901–539000 ==
back to top

Designation			Discovery			Properties		Ref
Permanent	Provisional	Named after	Date	Site	Discoverer(s)	Category	Diam.	Ref
538901	2016 GY_{263}	—	April 5, 2016	Haleakala	Pan-STARRS 1	·	2.4 km	MPC · JPL
538902	2016 GJ_{264}	—	January 27, 2015	Haleakala	Pan-STARRS 1	EOS	1.5 km	MPC · JPL
538903	2016 GN_{264}	—	October 4, 2012	Mount Lemmon	Mount Lemmon Survey	·	2.8 km	MPC · JPL
538904	2016 GO_{264}	—	January 23, 2015	Haleakala	Pan-STARRS 1	EOS	1.5 km	MPC · JPL
538905	2016 GV_{264}	—	November 2, 2013	Kitt Peak	Spacewatch	·	1.9 km	MPC · JPL
538906	2016 GK_{265}	—	December 11, 2014	Mount Lemmon	Mount Lemmon Survey	MAR	760 m	MPC · JPL
538907	2016 GM_{265}	—	December 29, 2014	Haleakala	Pan-STARRS 1	MAR	860 m	MPC · JPL
538908	2016 GR_{265}	—	February 16, 2015	Haleakala	Pan-STARRS 1	·	1.7 km	MPC · JPL
538909	2016 GK_{266}	—	January 18, 2015	Mount Lemmon	Mount Lemmon Survey	·	1.9 km	MPC · JPL
538910	2016 GR_{266}	—	November 17, 2014	Haleakala	Pan-STARRS 1	·	890 m	MPC · JPL
538911	2016 GX_{266}	—	January 20, 2015	Haleakala	Pan-STARRS 1	·	2.1 km	MPC · JPL
538912	2016 GZ_{266}	—	April 12, 2016	Haleakala	Pan-STARRS 1	·	850 m	MPC · JPL
538913	2016 GW_{267}	—	October 24, 2012	Haleakala	Pan-STARRS 1	·	2.7 km	MPC · JPL
538914	2016 GB_{268}	—	April 5, 2016	Haleakala	Pan-STARRS 1	·	1.4 km	MPC · JPL
538915	2016 GC_{268}	—	April 6, 2016	Mount Lemmon	Mount Lemmon Survey	H	400 m	MPC · JPL
538916	2016 HC_{5}	—	January 30, 2011	Haleakala	Pan-STARRS 1	·	2.6 km	MPC · JPL
538917	2016 HK_{6}	—	March 25, 2006	Kitt Peak	Spacewatch	·	810 m	MPC · JPL
538918	2016 HF_{7}	—	September 5, 2008	Kitt Peak	Spacewatch	·	2.3 km	MPC · JPL
538919	2016 HD_{8}	—	November 17, 2014	Haleakala	Pan-STARRS 1	·	3.1 km	MPC · JPL
538920	2016 HG_{8}	—	February 10, 2016	Haleakala	Pan-STARRS 1	·	860 m	MPC · JPL
538921	2016 HQ_{8}	—	October 22, 2009	Mount Lemmon	Mount Lemmon Survey	·	1.8 km	MPC · JPL
538922	2016 HK_{9}	—	January 2, 2009	Mount Lemmon	Mount Lemmon Survey	·	510 m	MPC · JPL
538923	2016 HX_{9}	—	November 6, 2010	Mount Lemmon	Mount Lemmon Survey	·	1.1 km	MPC · JPL
538924	2016 HO_{12}	—	January 31, 2006	Mount Lemmon	Mount Lemmon Survey	·	520 m	MPC · JPL
538925	2016 HG_{13}	—	March 5, 2008	Mount Lemmon	Mount Lemmon Survey	·	1.1 km	MPC · JPL
538926	2016 HF_{18}	—	April 8, 2006	Kitt Peak	Spacewatch	·	560 m	MPC · JPL
538927	2016 HG_{18}	—	January 27, 2015	Haleakala	Pan-STARRS 1	EOS	1.8 km	MPC · JPL
538928	2016 HV_{19}	—	September 29, 2005	Kitt Peak	Spacewatch	·	3.6 km	MPC · JPL
538929	2016 HW_{20}	—	March 4, 2005	Mount Lemmon	Mount Lemmon Survey	·	2.4 km	MPC · JPL
538930	2016 HW_{24}	—	March 8, 2008	Kitt Peak	Spacewatch	·	1.1 km	MPC · JPL
538931	2016 HX_{24}	—	September 23, 2008	Mount Lemmon	Mount Lemmon Survey	·	1.5 km	MPC · JPL
538932	2016 HY_{24}	—	November 1, 2013	Mount Lemmon	Mount Lemmon Survey	·	1.7 km	MPC · JPL
538933	2016 HB_{25}	—	February 3, 2012	Mount Lemmon	Mount Lemmon Survey	PHO	800 m	MPC · JPL
538934	2016 HQ_{25}	—	May 4, 2006	Kitt Peak	Spacewatch	·	590 m	MPC · JPL
538935	2016 HY_{25}	—	January 23, 2015	Haleakala	Pan-STARRS 1	·	2.6 km	MPC · JPL
538936	2016 JJ_{2}	—	February 16, 2010	Mount Lemmon	Mount Lemmon Survey	·	2.5 km	MPC · JPL
538937	2016 JC_{5}	—	April 8, 2010	Kitt Peak	Spacewatch	·	2.5 km	MPC · JPL
538938	2016 JS_{6}	—	November 1, 2008	Mount Lemmon	Mount Lemmon Survey	·	2.9 km	MPC · JPL
538939	2016 JY_{6}	—	September 18, 2010	Mount Lemmon	Mount Lemmon Survey	PHO	1.2 km	MPC · JPL
538940	2016 JQ_{9}	—	September 29, 2009	Mount Lemmon	Mount Lemmon Survey	HNS	920 m	MPC · JPL
538941	2016 JQ_{12}	—	February 7, 2002	Kitt Peak	Spacewatch	·	2.0 km	MPC · JPL
538942	2016 JW_{12}	—	August 17, 2009	Siding Spring	SSS	·	1.7 km	MPC · JPL
538943	2016 JZ_{12}	—	December 8, 2010	Mount Lemmon	Mount Lemmon Survey	EUN	1.3 km	MPC · JPL
538944	2016 JD_{13}	—	July 13, 2013	Haleakala	Pan-STARRS 1	·	590 m	MPC · JPL
538945	2016 JF_{13}	—	April 25, 2007	Kitt Peak	Spacewatch	·	1.9 km	MPC · JPL
538946	2016 JK_{13}	—	March 9, 2010	WISE	WISE	·	3.1 km	MPC · JPL
538947	2016 JV_{14}	—	May 12, 2012	Catalina	CSS	·	1.2 km	MPC · JPL
538948	2016 JO_{15}	—	October 30, 2006	Mount Lemmon	Mount Lemmon Survey	·	1.2 km	MPC · JPL
538949	2016 JE_{16}	—	May 24, 2011	Haleakala	Pan-STARRS 1	·	2.6 km	MPC · JPL
538950	2016 JK_{19}	—	April 30, 2011	Kitt Peak	Spacewatch	·	1.6 km	MPC · JPL
538951	2016 JA_{20}	—	August 16, 2009	Kitt Peak	Spacewatch	·	1.1 km	MPC · JPL
538952	2016 JD_{20}	—	September 14, 2007	Kitt Peak	Spacewatch	·	1.4 km	MPC · JPL
538953	2016 JD_{21}	—	December 5, 2007	Kitt Peak	Spacewatch	·	780 m	MPC · JPL
538954	2016 JX_{22}	—	May 4, 2009	Mount Lemmon	Mount Lemmon Survey	·	700 m	MPC · JPL
538955	2016 JJ_{23}	—	June 8, 2011	Mount Lemmon	Mount Lemmon Survey	·	2.3 km	MPC · JPL
538956	2016 JX_{23}	—	April 23, 2009	Kitt Peak	Spacewatch	·	650 m	MPC · JPL
538957	2016 JW_{24}	—	November 16, 2006	Kitt Peak	Spacewatch	·	2.2 km	MPC · JPL
538958	2016 JO_{25}	—	January 15, 2015	Haleakala	Pan-STARRS 1	·	3.3 km	MPC · JPL
538959	2016 JF_{26}	—	May 10, 2012	Haleakala	Pan-STARRS 1	·	1.5 km	MPC · JPL
538960	2016 JJ_{27}	—	January 23, 2006	Kitt Peak	Spacewatch	HOF	2.2 km	MPC · JPL
538961	2016 JL_{28}	—	January 17, 2015	Haleakala	Pan-STARRS 1	PHO	900 m	MPC · JPL
538962	2016 JP_{29}	—	March 13, 2016	Haleakala	Pan-STARRS 1	·	950 m	MPC · JPL
538963	2016 JT_{29}	—	April 9, 2003	Kitt Peak	Spacewatch	·	860 m	MPC · JPL
538964	2016 JV_{29}	—	October 30, 2011	Kitt Peak	Spacewatch	·	920 m	MPC · JPL
538965	2016 JQ_{32}	—	July 14, 2004	Siding Spring	SSS	·	1.7 km	MPC · JPL
538966	2016 JY_{34}	—	February 17, 2015	Haleakala	Pan-STARRS 1	·	3.7 km	MPC · JPL
538967	2016 JP_{35}	—	February 10, 2016	Haleakala	Pan-STARRS 1	·	650 m	MPC · JPL
538968	2016 JR_{35}	—	March 28, 2009	Mount Lemmon	Mount Lemmon Survey	·	910 m	MPC · JPL
538969	2016 JX_{35}	—	March 4, 2016	Haleakala	Pan-STARRS 1	·	560 m	MPC · JPL
538970	2016 JG_{40}	—	July 28, 2011	Haleakala	Pan-STARRS 1	·	3.0 km	MPC · JPL
538971	2016 JN_{40}	—	November 2, 2008	Mount Lemmon	Mount Lemmon Survey	·	1.7 km	MPC · JPL
538972	2016 JR_{40}	—	July 10, 2005	Siding Spring	SSS	EOS	2.4 km	MPC · JPL
538973	2016 JW_{40}	—	November 17, 2009	Mount Lemmon	Mount Lemmon Survey	·	2.1 km	MPC · JPL
538974	2016 JY_{40}	—	June 16, 2012	Mount Lemmon	Mount Lemmon Survey	·	870 m	MPC · JPL
538975	2016 JH_{41}	—	September 14, 2007	Mount Lemmon	Mount Lemmon Survey	·	1.4 km	MPC · JPL
538976	2016 JM_{41}	—	September 18, 2006	Kitt Peak	Spacewatch	·	870 m	MPC · JPL
538977	2016 JY_{41}	—	November 6, 2013	Haleakala	Pan-STARRS 1	·	2.7 km	MPC · JPL
538978	2016 JC_{42}	—	May 13, 2016	Haleakala	Pan-STARRS 1	MAR	860 m	MPC · JPL
538979	2016 KE	—	December 25, 2005	Mount Lemmon	Mount Lemmon Survey	AMO	430 m	MPC · JPL
538980	2016 KW_{4}	—	December 11, 2013	Haleakala	Pan-STARRS 1	·	2.6 km	MPC · JPL
538981	2016 KB_{5}	—	April 5, 2011	Kitt Peak	Spacewatch	·	1.5 km	MPC · JPL
538982	2016 KC_{5}	—	April 12, 2015	Haleakala	Pan-STARRS 1	·	2.2 km	MPC · JPL
538983	2016 KO_{5}	—	May 17, 2016	Haleakala	Pan-STARRS 1	BRA	1.3 km	MPC · JPL
538984	2016 KD_{6}	—	March 13, 2005	Kitt Peak	Spacewatch	·	810 m	MPC · JPL
538985	2016 KV_{6}	—	October 21, 2003	Kitt Peak	Spacewatch	·	930 m	MPC · JPL
538986	2016 KZ_{6}	—	December 4, 2005	Kitt Peak	Spacewatch	·	1.4 km	MPC · JPL
538987	2016 KA_{7}	—	May 11, 2007	Mount Lemmon	Mount Lemmon Survey	·	1.6 km	MPC · JPL
538988	2016 KC_{7}	—	May 17, 2010	Mount Lemmon	Mount Lemmon Survey	·	3.2 km	MPC · JPL
538989	2016 KG_{7}	—	November 23, 2008	Kitt Peak	Spacewatch	EOS	1.8 km	MPC · JPL
538990	2016 KK_{7}	—	December 29, 2005	Kitt Peak	Spacewatch	·	1.2 km	MPC · JPL
538991	2016 KM_{7}	—	March 25, 2006	Kitt Peak	Spacewatch	·	660 m	MPC · JPL
538992	2016 KO_{7}	—	June 5, 2005	Kitt Peak	Spacewatch	·	1.0 km	MPC · JPL
538993	2016 KT_{7}	—	October 4, 1996	Kitt Peak	Spacewatch	EOS	2.2 km	MPC · JPL
538994	2016 KW_{8}	—	May 2, 2006	Mount Lemmon	Mount Lemmon Survey	·	790 m	MPC · JPL
538995	2016 KF_{9}	—	March 27, 2012	Mount Lemmon	Mount Lemmon Survey	PHO	1.1 km	MPC · JPL
538996	2016 KO_{9}	—	December 2, 2013	Mount Lemmon	Mount Lemmon Survey	EOS	1.9 km	MPC · JPL
538997	2016 KV_{9}	—	December 29, 2014	Haleakala	Pan-STARRS 1	·	2.9 km	MPC · JPL
538998	2016 KY_{9}	—	January 10, 2008	Catalina	CSS	·	840 m	MPC · JPL
538999	2016 KZ_{9}	—	November 10, 2013	Kitt Peak	Spacewatch	·	1.4 km	MPC · JPL
539000	2016 KD_{10}	—	October 26, 2008	Mount Lemmon	Mount Lemmon Survey	·	1.9 km	MPC · JPL

back to top
