= List of minor planets: 478001–479000 =

The following is a partial list of minor planets, running from minor-planet number 478001 through 479000, inclusive. The primary data for this and other partial lists is based on JPL's "Small-Body Orbital Elements" and data available from the Minor Planet Center. Critical list information is also provided by the MPC, unless otherwise specified from Lowell Observatory. A detailed description of the table's columns and additional sources are given on the main page including a complete list of every page in this series, and a statistical break-up on the dynamical classification of minor planets.

Also see the summary list of all named bodies in numerical and alphabetical order, and the corresponding naming citations for the number range of this particular list. New namings may only be added to this list after official publication, as the preannouncement of names is condemned by the Working Group for Small Bodies Nomenclature of the International Astronomical Union.

Near-Earth obj.	MBA (inner)	MBA (outer)	Centaur
Mars-crosser	MBA (middle)	Jupiter trojan	Trans-Neptunian obj.
Unclassified

== 478001–478100 ==
Designation			Discovery			Properties		Ref
Permanent	Provisional	Named after	Date	Site	Discoverer(s)	Category	Diam.	Ref
478001	2011 SN_{139}	—	October 16, 2006	Kitt Peak	Spacewatch	·	1.2 km	MPC · JPL
478002	2011 SG_{140}	—	September 20, 2011	Kitt Peak	Spacewatch	·	1.5 km	MPC · JPL
478003	2011 SU_{141}	—	September 30, 2006	Mount Lemmon	Mount Lemmon Survey	·	1.4 km	MPC · JPL
478004	2011 SH_{142}	—	November 23, 2006	Kitt Peak	Spacewatch	·	2.2 km	MPC · JPL
478005	2011 SF_{144}	—	September 30, 2006	Catalina	CSS	·	2.3 km	MPC · JPL
478006	2011 SC_{160}	—	August 6, 2010	WISE	WISE	·	2.1 km	MPC · JPL
478007	2011 SL_{164}	—	September 19, 2006	Kitt Peak	Spacewatch	KOR	1.2 km	MPC · JPL
478008	2011 SN_{164}	—	May 15, 2009	Kitt Peak	Spacewatch	EOS	1.7 km	MPC · JPL
478009	2011 SM_{165}	—	September 24, 2011	Kitt Peak	Spacewatch	·	2.2 km	MPC · JPL
478010	2011 SN_{170}	—	February 12, 2008	Mount Lemmon	Mount Lemmon Survey	EOS	1.9 km	MPC · JPL
478011	2011 SA_{178}	—	September 24, 2000	Kitt Peak	Spacewatch	·	2.5 km	MPC · JPL
478012	2011 ST_{183}	—	January 30, 2008	Mount Lemmon	Mount Lemmon Survey	·	2.2 km	MPC · JPL
478013	2011 SQ_{184}	—	September 26, 2011	Kitt Peak	Spacewatch	H	440 m	MPC · JPL
478014	2011 SX_{189}	—	January 20, 2009	Kitt Peak	Spacewatch	·	1.9 km	MPC · JPL
478015	2011 SM_{191}	—	September 26, 2011	Haleakala	Pan-STARRS 1	GEF	1.5 km	MPC · JPL
478016	2011 SH_{192}	—	November 19, 2007	Kitt Peak	Spacewatch	·	1.8 km	MPC · JPL
478017	2011 SD_{197}	—	August 19, 2006	Kitt Peak	Spacewatch	KOR	1.2 km	MPC · JPL
478018	2011 SF_{197}	—	February 1, 2009	Kitt Peak	Spacewatch	·	1.7 km	MPC · JPL
478019	2011 SS_{197}	—	September 17, 2006	Kitt Peak	Spacewatch	·	1.3 km	MPC · JPL
478020	2011 SZ_{199}	—	November 3, 1997	Kitt Peak	Spacewatch	·	1.4 km	MPC · JPL
478021	2011 SB_{202}	—	September 15, 2006	Kitt Peak	Spacewatch	EOS	1.4 km	MPC · JPL
478022	2011 SZ_{206}	—	March 3, 2005	Catalina	CSS	·	2.4 km	MPC · JPL
478023	2011 SU_{208}	—	December 16, 2007	Mount Lemmon	Mount Lemmon Survey	·	2.1 km	MPC · JPL
478024	2011 SX_{208}	—	September 20, 2011	Kitt Peak	Spacewatch	HYG	2.5 km	MPC · JPL
478025	2011 SA_{210}	—	September 18, 2011	Mount Lemmon	Mount Lemmon Survey	·	2.0 km	MPC · JPL
478026	2011 SE_{217}	—	September 24, 2011	Mount Lemmon	Mount Lemmon Survey	·	2.0 km	MPC · JPL
478027	2011 SY_{225}	—	October 19, 2006	Catalina	CSS	·	1.7 km	MPC · JPL
478028	2011 SN_{233}	—	December 18, 2001	Socorro	LINEAR	EOS	2.3 km	MPC · JPL
478029	2011 SF_{236}	—	October 14, 2007	Mount Lemmon	Mount Lemmon Survey	AGN	1.1 km	MPC · JPL
478030	2011 SM_{236}	—	September 24, 2011	Mount Lemmon	Mount Lemmon Survey	·	1.6 km	MPC · JPL
478031	2011 SH_{240}	—	September 26, 2011	Mount Lemmon	Mount Lemmon Survey	KOR	1.3 km	MPC · JPL
478032	2011 SH_{241}	—	September 8, 2011	Kitt Peak	Spacewatch	·	2.2 km	MPC · JPL
478033	2011 SY_{242}	—	September 8, 2011	Kitt Peak	Spacewatch	·	2.3 km	MPC · JPL
478034	2011 SA_{254}	—	July 15, 2005	Mount Lemmon	Mount Lemmon Survey	EOS	1.8 km	MPC · JPL
478035	2011 SB_{255}	—	December 16, 2007	Kitt Peak	Spacewatch	DOR	2.2 km	MPC · JPL
478036	2011 SS_{255}	—	September 20, 2011	Kitt Peak	Spacewatch	EOS	1.9 km	MPC · JPL
478037	2011 SN_{256}	—	November 11, 2006	Mount Lemmon	Mount Lemmon Survey	THM	1.6 km	MPC · JPL
478038	2011 SA_{257}	—	January 18, 2008	Mount Lemmon	Mount Lemmon Survey	EOS	1.6 km	MPC · JPL
478039	2011 SA_{258}	—	October 27, 2006	Kitt Peak	Spacewatch	·	1.7 km	MPC · JPL
478040	2011 SV_{258}	—	September 24, 2011	Mount Lemmon	Mount Lemmon Survey	·	2.5 km	MPC · JPL
478041	2011 SY_{258}	—	September 24, 2011	Mount Lemmon	Mount Lemmon Survey	·	2.6 km	MPC · JPL
478042	2011 SE_{259}	—	September 26, 2011	Catalina	CSS	·	2.3 km	MPC · JPL
478043	2011 SG_{259}	—	September 26, 2011	Mount Lemmon	Mount Lemmon Survey	·	2.5 km	MPC · JPL
478044	2011 SZ_{259}	—	October 20, 1995	Kitt Peak	Spacewatch	·	2.1 km	MPC · JPL
478045	2011 SB_{260}	—	September 29, 2011	Mount Lemmon	Mount Lemmon Survey	EOS	1.4 km	MPC · JPL
478046	2011 SS_{260}	—	September 21, 2011	Kitt Peak	Spacewatch	·	2.7 km	MPC · JPL
478047	2011 SB_{261}	—	November 18, 2006	Kitt Peak	Spacewatch	·	1.7 km	MPC · JPL
478048	2011 SD_{261}	—	September 15, 2006	Kitt Peak	Spacewatch	KOR	1.1 km	MPC · JPL
478049	2011 SO_{261}	—	September 15, 2006	Kitt Peak	Spacewatch	KOR	1.1 km	MPC · JPL
478050	2011 SR_{265}	—	October 27, 2006	Mount Lemmon	Mount Lemmon Survey	·	2.5 km	MPC · JPL
478051	2011 SU_{268}	—	November 14, 2006	Mount Lemmon	Mount Lemmon Survey	EOS	2.0 km	MPC · JPL
478052	2011 SR_{274}	—	April 2, 2005	Kitt Peak	Spacewatch	MRX	1.2 km	MPC · JPL
478053	2011 SU_{275}	—	January 10, 2008	Mount Lemmon	Mount Lemmon Survey	·	1.9 km	MPC · JPL
478054	2011 TX	—	February 9, 2008	Kitt Peak	Spacewatch	·	3.0 km	MPC · JPL
478055	2011 TU_{7}	—	September 8, 2011	Kitt Peak	Spacewatch	GEF	1.1 km	MPC · JPL
478056	2011 TB_{8}	—	September 20, 2011	Kitt Peak	Spacewatch	KOR	1.3 km	MPC · JPL
478057	2011 TC_{10}	—	October 1, 2011	Mount Lemmon	Mount Lemmon Survey	H	540 m	MPC · JPL
478058	2011 TJ_{10}	—	September 8, 2011	Kitt Peak	Spacewatch	·	1.6 km	MPC · JPL
478059	2011 TR_{13}	—	September 22, 2011	Mount Lemmon	Mount Lemmon Survey	·	2.7 km	MPC · JPL
478060	2011 TH_{14}	—	October 3, 2006	Mount Lemmon	Mount Lemmon Survey	·	1.8 km	MPC · JPL
478061	2011 TN_{15}	—	October 31, 2002	Kitt Peak	Spacewatch	DOR	2.2 km	MPC · JPL
478062	2011 UZ_{2}	—	September 22, 2011	Kitt Peak	Spacewatch	·	2.9 km	MPC · JPL
478063	2011 UA_{4}	—	September 20, 2000	Kitt Peak	Spacewatch	·	2.9 km	MPC · JPL
478064	2011 UM_{4}	—	September 25, 2006	Mount Lemmon	Mount Lemmon Survey	KOR	1.0 km	MPC · JPL
478065	2011 UT_{5}	—	May 20, 2010	WISE	WISE	·	3.0 km	MPC · JPL
478066	2011 UB_{6}	—	April 27, 2009	Mount Lemmon	Mount Lemmon Survey	·	3.1 km	MPC · JPL
478067	2011 UR_{6}	—	October 18, 2011	Mount Lemmon	Mount Lemmon Survey	·	1.5 km	MPC · JPL
478068	2011 UY_{6}	—	October 18, 2011	Mount Lemmon	Mount Lemmon Survey	·	3.0 km	MPC · JPL
478069	2011 UA_{7}	—	December 13, 2006	Mount Lemmon	Mount Lemmon Survey	·	1.8 km	MPC · JPL
478070	2011 UQ_{8}	—	August 30, 2005	Kitt Peak	Spacewatch	·	2.3 km	MPC · JPL
478071	2011 UJ_{9}	—	October 29, 2000	Kitt Peak	Spacewatch	·	2.6 km	MPC · JPL
478072	2011 UT_{10}	—	November 2, 2007	Mount Lemmon	Mount Lemmon Survey	·	2.0 km	MPC · JPL
478073	2011 UE_{11}	—	September 19, 2011	Mount Lemmon	Mount Lemmon Survey	·	2.0 km	MPC · JPL
478074	2011 UW_{13}	—	November 22, 2006	Kitt Peak	Spacewatch	·	1.6 km	MPC · JPL
478075	2011 UB_{23}	—	October 13, 2006	Kitt Peak	Spacewatch	·	2.5 km	MPC · JPL
478076	2011 UL_{24}	—	November 27, 2006	Kitt Peak	Spacewatch	·	2.3 km	MPC · JPL
478077	2011 UZ_{25}	—	October 17, 2011	Kitt Peak	Spacewatch	·	2.4 km	MPC · JPL
478078	2011 UD_{26}	—	May 2, 2008	Mount Lemmon	Mount Lemmon Survey	·	2.9 km	MPC · JPL
478079	2011 UE_{29}	—	September 4, 2010	Mount Lemmon	Mount Lemmon Survey	·	3.0 km	MPC · JPL
478080	2011 UG_{29}	—	April 11, 2010	WISE	WISE	·	4.9 km	MPC · JPL
478081	2011 UX_{29}	—	October 18, 2011	Mount Lemmon	Mount Lemmon Survey	·	2.4 km	MPC · JPL
478082	2011 UQ_{33}	—	December 16, 2006	Catalina	CSS	·	2.9 km	MPC · JPL
478083	2011 UM_{35}	—	September 22, 2011	Kitt Peak	Spacewatch	VER	2.5 km	MPC · JPL
478084	2011 UB_{38}	—	September 23, 2005	Kitt Peak	Spacewatch	VER	3.2 km	MPC · JPL
478085	2011 US_{38}	—	November 15, 1995	Kitt Peak	Spacewatch	·	1.9 km	MPC · JPL
478086	2011 UP_{40}	—	September 28, 2011	Mount Lemmon	Mount Lemmon Survey	·	1.8 km	MPC · JPL
478087	2011 UB_{41}	—	November 23, 2006	Mount Lemmon	Mount Lemmon Survey	·	1.8 km	MPC · JPL
478088	2011 UJ_{41}	—	September 27, 2006	Mount Lemmon	Mount Lemmon Survey	KOR	1.2 km	MPC · JPL
478089	2011 UU_{41}	—	September 28, 2011	Mount Lemmon	Mount Lemmon Survey	·	2.5 km	MPC · JPL
478090	2011 UD_{45}	—	September 23, 2011	Kitt Peak	Spacewatch	·	2.9 km	MPC · JPL
478091	2011 UF_{48}	—	October 21, 2006	Mount Lemmon	Mount Lemmon Survey	·	1.8 km	MPC · JPL
478092	2011 UJ_{48}	—	August 30, 2005	Kitt Peak	Spacewatch	THM	2.1 km	MPC · JPL
478093	2011 US_{48}	—	September 21, 2011	Mount Lemmon	Mount Lemmon Survey	EOS	2.0 km	MPC · JPL
478094	2011 UR_{49}	—	October 18, 2011	Kitt Peak	Spacewatch	·	2.9 km	MPC · JPL
478095	2011 UV_{50}	—	March 3, 2008	Mount Lemmon	Mount Lemmon Survey	·	2.7 km	MPC · JPL
478096	2011 UA_{54}	—	October 18, 2011	Mount Lemmon	Mount Lemmon Survey	·	3.0 km	MPC · JPL
478097	2011 UF_{54}	—	April 29, 2009	Kitt Peak	Spacewatch	EOS	2.2 km	MPC · JPL
478098	2011 UO_{58}	—	September 30, 2006	Mount Lemmon	Mount Lemmon Survey	TEL	1.1 km	MPC · JPL
478099	2011 UV_{61}	—	October 21, 2011	Mount Lemmon	Mount Lemmon Survey	·	2.8 km	MPC · JPL
478100	2011 UZ_{61}	—	October 21, 2011	Mount Lemmon	Mount Lemmon Survey	·	2.3 km	MPC · JPL

== 478101–478200 ==
back to top

Designation			Discovery			Properties		Ref
Permanent	Provisional	Named after	Date	Site	Discoverer(s)	Category	Diam.	Ref
478101	2011 US_{64}	—	November 12, 2006	Mount Lemmon	Mount Lemmon Survey	·	1.3 km	MPC · JPL
478102	2011 UR_{66}	—	October 21, 1995	Kitt Peak	Spacewatch	EOS	1.6 km	MPC · JPL
478103	2011 UH_{74}	—	September 20, 2011	Mount Lemmon	Mount Lemmon Survey	·	1.9 km	MPC · JPL
478104	2011 UL_{74}	—	November 20, 2006	Kitt Peak	Spacewatch	·	2.3 km	MPC · JPL
478105	2011 UW_{74}	—	September 28, 2011	Kitt Peak	Spacewatch	EOS	1.9 km	MPC · JPL
478106	2011 UB_{76}	—	October 19, 2011	Kitt Peak	Spacewatch	·	2.7 km	MPC · JPL
478107	2011 UJ_{76}	—	October 25, 2000	Socorro	LINEAR	LIX	4.0 km	MPC · JPL
478108	2011 UC_{78}	—	September 23, 2011	Mount Lemmon	Mount Lemmon Survey	·	3.4 km	MPC · JPL
478109	2011 UK_{80}	—	October 19, 2011	Kitt Peak	Spacewatch	·	2.6 km	MPC · JPL
478110	2011 UW_{81}	—	October 19, 2011	Kitt Peak	Spacewatch	·	2.7 km	MPC · JPL
478111	2011 UF_{82}	—	October 19, 2011	Kitt Peak	Spacewatch	·	2.9 km	MPC · JPL
478112	2011 US_{82}	—	September 27, 2011	Mount Lemmon	Mount Lemmon Survey	·	2.6 km	MPC · JPL
478113	2011 UT_{82}	—	July 4, 2010	Kitt Peak	Spacewatch	EOS	2.2 km	MPC · JPL
478114	2011 UW_{84}	—	May 21, 2010	WISE	WISE	·	2.6 km	MPC · JPL
478115	2011 UK_{85}	—	May 31, 2010	WISE	WISE	·	3.3 km	MPC · JPL
478116	2011 UM_{88}	—	September 29, 2005	Mount Lemmon	Mount Lemmon Survey	THM	1.8 km	MPC · JPL
478117	2011 UR_{97}	—	October 19, 2011	Mount Lemmon	Mount Lemmon Survey	·	1.4 km	MPC · JPL
478118	2011 UG_{98}	—	October 20, 2011	Kitt Peak	Spacewatch	·	2.4 km	MPC · JPL
478119	2011 UZ_{99}	—	October 20, 2011	Mount Lemmon	Mount Lemmon Survey	·	3.5 km	MPC · JPL
478120	2011 UY_{101}	—	October 20, 2011	Mount Lemmon	Mount Lemmon Survey	·	3.0 km	MPC · JPL
478121	2011 UB_{103}	—	June 6, 2010	WISE	WISE	URS	3.3 km	MPC · JPL
478122	2011 UY_{103}	—	September 23, 2011	Mount Lemmon	Mount Lemmon Survey	EOS	2.0 km	MPC · JPL
478123	2011 UF_{105}	—	October 21, 2011	Mount Lemmon	Mount Lemmon Survey	·	3.0 km	MPC · JPL
478124	2011 UG_{107}	—	November 16, 2006	Kitt Peak	Spacewatch	·	2.2 km	MPC · JPL
478125	2011 UU_{107}	—	November 15, 2006	Mount Lemmon	Mount Lemmon Survey	·	2.1 km	MPC · JPL
478126	2011 UW_{112}	—	September 24, 2011	Mount Lemmon	Mount Lemmon Survey	·	3.6 km	MPC · JPL
478127	2011 UZ_{112}	—	September 25, 2005	Kitt Peak	Spacewatch	VER	2.5 km	MPC · JPL
478128	2011 UJ_{113}	—	October 19, 2011	Mount Lemmon	Mount Lemmon Survey	·	2.4 km	MPC · JPL
478129	2011 UY_{119}	—	May 15, 2010	WISE	WISE	·	3.7 km	MPC · JPL
478130	2011 US_{120}	—	July 5, 2005	Mount Lemmon	Mount Lemmon Survey	·	2.2 km	MPC · JPL
478131	2011 UX_{122}	—	September 21, 2011	Kitt Peak	Spacewatch	THM	2.4 km	MPC · JPL
478132	2011 UG_{125}	—	November 16, 2006	Kitt Peak	Spacewatch	·	1.8 km	MPC · JPL
478133	2011 UG_{126}	—	September 28, 2003	Kitt Peak	Spacewatch	H	520 m	MPC · JPL
478134	2011 UL_{127}	—	March 28, 2009	Kitt Peak	Spacewatch	·	3.2 km	MPC · JPL
478135	2011 UG_{129}	—	December 5, 2007	Kitt Peak	Spacewatch	·	1.7 km	MPC · JPL
478136	2011 UU_{131}	—	September 18, 1995	Kitt Peak	Spacewatch	·	1.4 km	MPC · JPL
478137	2011 UK_{136}	—	October 20, 2011	Mount Lemmon	Mount Lemmon Survey	·	2.9 km	MPC · JPL
478138	2011 UV_{136}	—	November 18, 1995	Kitt Peak	Spacewatch	EOS	1.7 km	MPC · JPL
478139	2011 UW_{136}	—	October 20, 2011	Mount Lemmon	Mount Lemmon Survey	·	3.9 km	MPC · JPL
478140	2011 UL_{138}	—	July 27, 2005	Siding Spring	SSS	·	4.1 km	MPC · JPL
478141	2011 UD_{139}	—	October 22, 2011	Kitt Peak	Spacewatch	·	2.1 km	MPC · JPL
478142	2011 UV_{143}	—	September 12, 2005	Kitt Peak	Spacewatch	·	2.5 km	MPC · JPL
478143	2011 UJ_{145}	—	October 29, 2005	Catalina	CSS	·	2.8 km	MPC · JPL
478144	2011 UV_{145}	—	December 1, 2006	Mount Lemmon	Mount Lemmon Survey	·	2.3 km	MPC · JPL
478145	2011 UW_{147}	—	October 16, 2006	Kitt Peak	Spacewatch	·	2.1 km	MPC · JPL
478146	2011 US_{152}	—	September 26, 2005	Catalina	CSS	·	3.0 km	MPC · JPL
478147	2011 UA_{154}	—	July 12, 2005	Mount Lemmon	Mount Lemmon Survey	·	3.4 km	MPC · JPL
478148	2011 UE_{154}	—	August 28, 2005	Kitt Peak	Spacewatch	·	3.1 km	MPC · JPL
478149	2011 UT_{154}	—	August 30, 2005	Kitt Peak	Spacewatch	THM	2.1 km	MPC · JPL
478150	2011 UR_{155}	—	October 24, 2011	Mount Lemmon	Mount Lemmon Survey	·	2.1 km	MPC · JPL
478151	2011 UW_{156}	—	September 27, 2000	Socorro	LINEAR	·	2.4 km	MPC · JPL
478152	2011 UY_{156}	—	October 18, 2007	Kitt Peak	Spacewatch	·	1.6 km	MPC · JPL
478153	2011 UM_{157}	—	October 25, 2011	Kitt Peak	Spacewatch	EOS	1.6 km	MPC · JPL
478154	2011 UT_{157}	—	October 25, 2011	Kitt Peak	Spacewatch	·	1.7 km	MPC · JPL
478155	2011 UF_{159}	—	September 23, 2011	Kitt Peak	Spacewatch	·	2.5 km	MPC · JPL
478156	2011 UP_{159}	—	May 1, 2000	Kitt Peak	Spacewatch	H	560 m	MPC · JPL
478157	2011 UV_{160}	—	October 21, 2011	Mount Lemmon	Mount Lemmon Survey	·	2.8 km	MPC · JPL
478158	2011 UR_{167}	—	November 6, 1996	Kitt Peak	Spacewatch	·	1.3 km	MPC · JPL
478159	2011 UK_{172}	—	February 3, 2008	Kitt Peak	Spacewatch	·	3.0 km	MPC · JPL
478160	2011 UB_{173}	—	November 19, 2007	Mount Lemmon	Mount Lemmon Survey	·	2.2 km	MPC · JPL
478161	2011 UC_{173}	—	November 14, 2006	Mount Lemmon	Mount Lemmon Survey	LIX	3.3 km	MPC · JPL
478162	2011 UN_{175}	—	April 10, 2010	WISE	WISE	LIX	3.3 km	MPC · JPL
478163	2011 UW_{175}	—	October 17, 1995	Kitt Peak	Spacewatch	·	2.4 km	MPC · JPL
478164	2011 UE_{176}	—	March 26, 2004	Socorro	LINEAR	·	2.5 km	MPC · JPL
478165	2011 UG_{176}	—	March 27, 2010	WISE	WISE	·	2.9 km	MPC · JPL
478166	2011 UW_{176}	—	October 24, 2011	Kitt Peak	Spacewatch	LIX	3.5 km	MPC · JPL
478167	2011 UV_{177}	—	October 18, 1995	Kitt Peak	Spacewatch	·	2.1 km	MPC · JPL
478168	2011 UH_{178}	—	October 19, 2011	Mount Lemmon	Mount Lemmon Survey	·	1.5 km	MPC · JPL
478169	2011 UR_{180}	—	November 18, 2006	Kitt Peak	Spacewatch	·	1.6 km	MPC · JPL
478170	2011 UM_{181}	—	March 26, 2003	Kitt Peak	Spacewatch	·	2.4 km	MPC · JPL
478171	2011 UR_{182}	—	September 26, 2005	Kitt Peak	Spacewatch	·	2.8 km	MPC · JPL
478172	2011 UM_{183}	—	June 9, 2010	WISE	WISE	·	3.5 km	MPC · JPL
478173	2011 UP_{190}	—	December 10, 2002	Socorro	LINEAR	·	2.3 km	MPC · JPL
478174	2011 UZ_{190}	—	October 19, 2011	Mount Lemmon	Mount Lemmon Survey	EOS	1.9 km	MPC · JPL
478175	2011 UV_{191}	—	October 20, 2011	Kitt Peak	Spacewatch	·	2.0 km	MPC · JPL
478176	2011 UT_{193}	—	October 20, 2011	Kitt Peak	Spacewatch	·	2.3 km	MPC · JPL
478177	2011 UY_{193}	—	September 23, 2011	Catalina	CSS	H	650 m	MPC · JPL
478178	2011 UU_{198}	—	August 29, 2005	Kitt Peak	Spacewatch	HYG	2.0 km	MPC · JPL
478179	2011 UX_{199}	—	October 25, 2011	Kitt Peak	Spacewatch	·	2.1 km	MPC · JPL
478180	2011 UX_{201}	—	September 11, 2005	Kitt Peak	Spacewatch	THM	1.8 km	MPC · JPL
478181	2011 UN_{202}	—	October 21, 1995	Kitt Peak	Spacewatch	·	1.8 km	MPC · JPL
478182	2011 UJ_{208}	—	April 14, 2010	WISE	WISE	·	3.4 km	MPC · JPL
478183	2011 UL_{212}	—	April 29, 2010	WISE	WISE	·	3.1 km	MPC · JPL
478184	2011 UP_{223}	—	September 21, 2011	Kitt Peak	Spacewatch	·	2.3 km	MPC · JPL
478185	2011 UC_{230}	—	April 19, 2009	Mount Lemmon	Mount Lemmon Survey	·	1.7 km	MPC · JPL
478186	2011 UO_{233}	—	November 16, 2006	Kitt Peak	Spacewatch	·	2.4 km	MPC · JPL
478187	2011 UG_{235}	—	March 19, 2010	WISE	WISE	·	2.9 km	MPC · JPL
478188	2011 UW_{241}	—	May 28, 2010	WISE	WISE	·	2.9 km	MPC · JPL
478189	2011 UZ_{241}	—	September 27, 2011	Mount Lemmon	Mount Lemmon Survey	·	2.0 km	MPC · JPL
478190	2011 US_{242}	—	September 11, 2005	Kitt Peak	Spacewatch	·	1.7 km	MPC · JPL
478191	2011 UG_{243}	—	March 31, 2008	Mount Lemmon	Mount Lemmon Survey	·	3.1 km	MPC · JPL
478192	2011 UB_{244}	—	May 21, 2010	WISE	WISE	·	2.8 km	MPC · JPL
478193	2011 UD_{244}	—	October 18, 2011	Kitt Peak	Spacewatch	·	1.7 km	MPC · JPL
478194	2011 UY_{244}	—	September 1, 2005	Kitt Peak	Spacewatch	·	2.2 km	MPC · JPL
478195	2011 UK_{247}	—	May 28, 2009	Mount Lemmon	Mount Lemmon Survey	·	3.2 km	MPC · JPL
478196	2011 UG_{249}	—	April 21, 2009	Kitt Peak	Spacewatch	·	3.3 km	MPC · JPL
478197	2011 UC_{250}	—	September 13, 2005	Kitt Peak	Spacewatch	THM	1.8 km	MPC · JPL
478198	2011 UJ_{250}	—	January 24, 2007	Mount Lemmon	Mount Lemmon Survey	THM	2.0 km	MPC · JPL
478199	2011 UQ_{252}	—	May 24, 2010	WISE	WISE	·	2.8 km	MPC · JPL
478200	2011 UZ_{252}	—	December 14, 2006	Kitt Peak	Spacewatch	·	1.9 km	MPC · JPL

== 478201–478300 ==
back to top

Designation			Discovery			Properties		Ref
Permanent	Provisional	Named after	Date	Site	Discoverer(s)	Category	Diam.	Ref
478201	2011 UB_{253}	—	September 24, 2011	Mount Lemmon	Mount Lemmon Survey	THM	2.2 km	MPC · JPL
478202	2011 UQ_{253}	—	October 21, 2011	Mount Lemmon	Mount Lemmon Survey	EOS	2.0 km	MPC · JPL
478203	2011 UA_{257}	—	November 14, 2006	Kitt Peak	Spacewatch	·	1.0 km	MPC · JPL
478204	2011 UN_{263}	—	August 30, 2005	Kitt Peak	Spacewatch	THM	1.9 km	MPC · JPL
478205	2011 UM_{268}	—	October 19, 2006	Catalina	CSS	·	1.9 km	MPC · JPL
478206	2011 UB_{279}	—	October 1, 2005	Mount Lemmon	Mount Lemmon Survey	·	2.4 km	MPC · JPL
478207	2011 UP_{282}	—	March 30, 2008	Catalina	CSS	·	3.3 km	MPC · JPL
478208	2011 UM_{283}	—	October 28, 2011	Kitt Peak	Spacewatch	·	2.7 km	MPC · JPL
478209	2011 UV_{283}	—	October 20, 2011	Kitt Peak	Spacewatch	·	2.6 km	MPC · JPL
478210	2011 UC_{297}	—	October 2, 2006	Kitt Peak	Spacewatch	·	1.6 km	MPC · JPL
478211	2011 US_{297}	—	November 12, 2006	Mount Lemmon	Mount Lemmon Survey	·	1.4 km	MPC · JPL
478212	2011 UU_{298}	—	September 30, 2011	Mount Lemmon	Mount Lemmon Survey	·	2.1 km	MPC · JPL
478213	2011 UK_{299}	—	October 21, 2011	Kitt Peak	Spacewatch	EOS	2.0 km	MPC · JPL
478214	2011 UU_{299}	—	August 30, 2005	Kitt Peak	Spacewatch	THM	2.1 km	MPC · JPL
478215	2011 UO_{301}	—	November 14, 2006	Kitt Peak	Spacewatch	·	1.5 km	MPC · JPL
478216	2011 UG_{303}	—	October 21, 2006	Mount Lemmon	Mount Lemmon Survey	·	1.9 km	MPC · JPL
478217	2011 UQ_{305}	—	November 19, 2006	Kitt Peak	Spacewatch	·	2.0 km	MPC · JPL
478218	2011 UV_{308}	—	November 16, 2006	Kitt Peak	Spacewatch	·	3.1 km	MPC · JPL
478219	2011 UY_{311}	—	April 26, 2010	WISE	WISE	·	2.7 km	MPC · JPL
478220	2011 UL_{312}	—	February 16, 2010	WISE	WISE	·	3.4 km	MPC · JPL
478221	2011 UJ_{313}	—	November 16, 2006	Kitt Peak	Spacewatch	EOS	1.4 km	MPC · JPL
478222	2011 UO_{313}	—	October 30, 2011	Kitt Peak	Spacewatch	·	3.1 km	MPC · JPL
478223	2011 UB_{314}	—	October 18, 2011	Kitt Peak	Spacewatch	·	3.0 km	MPC · JPL
478224	2011 UV_{314}	—	October 30, 2011	Kitt Peak	Spacewatch	·	2.4 km	MPC · JPL
478225	2011 UC_{317}	—	October 22, 2011	Kitt Peak	Spacewatch	·	2.3 km	MPC · JPL
478226	2011 UY_{317}	—	May 24, 2010	WISE	WISE	·	2.6 km	MPC · JPL
478227	2011 UH_{323}	—	November 15, 2006	Kitt Peak	Spacewatch	THM	2.3 km	MPC · JPL
478228	2011 UH_{327}	—	August 30, 2005	Kitt Peak	Spacewatch	·	2.4 km	MPC · JPL
478229	2011 UB_{329}	—	March 1, 2008	Mount Lemmon	Mount Lemmon Survey	·	2.1 km	MPC · JPL
478230	2011 UP_{329}	—	February 28, 2008	Mount Lemmon	Mount Lemmon Survey	EOS	1.6 km	MPC · JPL
478231	2011 UO_{331}	—	October 13, 2005	Kitt Peak	Spacewatch	·	3.2 km	MPC · JPL
478232	2011 UA_{334}	—	October 13, 2006	Kitt Peak	Spacewatch	·	2.4 km	MPC · JPL
478233	2011 UR_{334}	—	September 21, 2011	Catalina	CSS	·	2.5 km	MPC · JPL
478234	2011 UM_{335}	—	September 21, 2011	Kitt Peak	Spacewatch	·	2.4 km	MPC · JPL
478235	2011 UR_{335}	—	September 24, 2011	Mount Lemmon	Mount Lemmon Survey	·	2.1 km	MPC · JPL
478236	2011 UY_{337}	—	September 20, 2011	Kitt Peak	Spacewatch	EOS	1.8 km	MPC · JPL
478237	2011 UK_{338}	—	September 26, 2011	Mount Lemmon	Mount Lemmon Survey	·	1.9 km	MPC · JPL
478238	2011 UE_{340}	—	November 19, 2007	Kitt Peak	Spacewatch	·	1.6 km	MPC · JPL
478239	2011 UH_{340}	—	April 15, 2010	WISE	WISE	URS	3.2 km	MPC · JPL
478240	2011 UF_{341}	—	October 18, 2011	Kitt Peak	Spacewatch	·	3.2 km	MPC · JPL
478241	2011 UK_{344}	—	April 27, 2009	Mount Lemmon	Mount Lemmon Survey	EOS	2.1 km	MPC · JPL
478242	2011 UK_{349}	—	March 1, 2008	Catalina	CSS	·	3.7 km	MPC · JPL
478243	2011 UW_{350}	—	October 19, 2011	Mount Lemmon	Mount Lemmon Survey	·	2.1 km	MPC · JPL
478244	2011 UH_{351}	—	October 19, 2011	Mount Lemmon	Mount Lemmon Survey	THM	1.9 km	MPC · JPL
478245	2011 UB_{356}	—	July 3, 2005	Mount Lemmon	Mount Lemmon Survey	·	1.6 km	MPC · JPL
478246	2011 UQ_{356}	—	May 1, 2003	Kitt Peak	Spacewatch	·	2.7 km	MPC · JPL
478247	2011 UX_{359}	—	October 20, 2006	Kitt Peak	Spacewatch	·	3.1 km	MPC · JPL
478248	2011 UE_{360}	—	September 21, 2011	Kitt Peak	Spacewatch	·	1.3 km	MPC · JPL
478249	2011 UT_{360}	—	January 13, 2002	Kitt Peak	Spacewatch	·	1.9 km	MPC · JPL
478250	2011 UV_{365}	—	September 30, 1995	Kitt Peak	Spacewatch	·	1.6 km	MPC · JPL
478251	2011 UQ_{367}	—	September 20, 2011	Kitt Peak	Spacewatch	EOS	1.5 km	MPC · JPL
478252	2011 UJ_{368}	—	November 17, 2006	Kitt Peak	Spacewatch	·	2.5 km	MPC · JPL
478253	2011 UV_{368}	—	September 29, 1994	Kitt Peak	Spacewatch	·	1.6 km	MPC · JPL
478254	2011 UM_{373}	—	October 27, 2006	Mount Lemmon	Mount Lemmon Survey	·	2.2 km	MPC · JPL
478255	2011 UB_{374}	—	October 23, 2011	Kitt Peak	Spacewatch	·	2.9 km	MPC · JPL
478256	2011 UV_{387}	—	September 27, 2000	Kitt Peak	Spacewatch	·	2.1 km	MPC · JPL
478257	2011 UF_{391}	—	April 3, 2008	Kitt Peak	Spacewatch	·	2.7 km	MPC · JPL
478258	2011 UA_{392}	—	October 22, 2006	Mount Lemmon	Mount Lemmon Survey	HYG	2.8 km	MPC · JPL
478259	2011 UP_{394}	—	January 9, 2002	Kitt Peak	Spacewatch	·	2.6 km	MPC · JPL
478260	2011 UA_{395}	—	May 4, 2010	WISE	WISE	·	4.0 km	MPC · JPL
478261	2011 UB_{400}	—	March 11, 2008	Kitt Peak	Spacewatch	·	2.3 km	MPC · JPL
478262	2011 UR_{401}	—	October 21, 2011	Kitt Peak	Spacewatch	·	1.6 km	MPC · JPL
478263	2011 UT_{401}	—	April 22, 2009	Mount Lemmon	Mount Lemmon Survey	·	2.5 km	MPC · JPL
478264	2011 UW_{401}	—	November 19, 2006	Kitt Peak	Spacewatch	·	1.7 km	MPC · JPL
478265	2011 UU_{403}	—	October 1, 2005	Catalina	CSS	·	2.9 km	MPC · JPL
478266	2011 UG_{404}	—	October 22, 2011	Mount Lemmon	Mount Lemmon Survey	H	800 m	MPC · JPL
478267	2011 UE_{406}	—	September 21, 2011	Kitt Peak	Spacewatch	·	2.6 km	MPC · JPL
478268	2011 UF_{407}	—	September 17, 2006	Catalina	CSS	·	2.5 km	MPC · JPL
478269	2011 UO_{408}	—	August 21, 2006	Kitt Peak	Spacewatch	·	1.5 km	MPC · JPL
478270	2011 VF	—	October 20, 2011	Kitt Peak	Spacewatch	·	3.1 km	MPC · JPL
478271	2011 VE_{2}	—	October 24, 2011	Catalina	CSS	H	730 m	MPC · JPL
478272	2011 VN_{4}	—	November 2, 2011	Mount Lemmon	Mount Lemmon Survey	·	2.9 km	MPC · JPL
478273	2011 VY_{4}	—	October 23, 2005	Catalina	CSS	·	4.1 km	MPC · JPL
478274	2011 VT_{8}	—	November 17, 2006	Mount Lemmon	Mount Lemmon Survey	·	2.3 km	MPC · JPL
478275	2011 VN_{13}	—	June 17, 2004	Kitt Peak	Spacewatch	·	2.9 km	MPC · JPL
478276	2011 VX_{14}	—	October 27, 2006	Mount Lemmon	Mount Lemmon Survey	·	1.6 km	MPC · JPL
478277	2011 VV_{15}	—	September 28, 2006	Mount Lemmon	Mount Lemmon Survey	·	2.4 km	MPC · JPL
478278	2011 VH_{19}	—	December 12, 2006	Mount Lemmon	Mount Lemmon Survey	·	1.2 km	MPC · JPL
478279	2011 VQ_{19}	—	February 28, 2008	Mount Lemmon	Mount Lemmon Survey	·	2.5 km	MPC · JPL
478280	2011 VM_{21}	—	September 12, 2005	Kitt Peak	Spacewatch	THM	1.7 km	MPC · JPL
478281	2011 VY_{21}	—	March 18, 2009	Kitt Peak	Spacewatch	·	1.8 km	MPC · JPL
478282	2011 VK_{22}	—	September 13, 2005	Kitt Peak	Spacewatch	·	2.5 km	MPC · JPL
478283	2011 WC_{4}	—	September 20, 2011	Kitt Peak	Spacewatch	EOS	2.1 km	MPC · JPL
478284	2011 WM_{4}	—	November 1, 2011	Catalina	CSS	·	3.4 km	MPC · JPL
478285	2011 WU_{5}	—	March 27, 2008	Mount Lemmon	Mount Lemmon Survey	·	1.9 km	MPC · JPL
478286	2011 WX_{5}	—	August 29, 2005	Kitt Peak	Spacewatch	·	2.3 km	MPC · JPL
478287	2011 WK_{10}	—	November 24, 2006	Mount Lemmon	Mount Lemmon Survey	KOR	1.3 km	MPC · JPL
478288	2011 WH_{11}	—	May 31, 2010	WISE	WISE	·	3.9 km	MPC · JPL
478289	2011 WU_{13}	—	May 20, 2010	WISE	WISE	·	3.0 km	MPC · JPL
478290	2011 WE_{14}	—	October 21, 2006	Mount Lemmon	Mount Lemmon Survey	·	1.6 km	MPC · JPL
478291	2011 WJ_{16}	—	September 2, 2010	Mount Lemmon	Mount Lemmon Survey	TEL	1.2 km	MPC · JPL
478292	2011 WT_{16}	—	October 28, 2011	Mount Lemmon	Mount Lemmon Survey	·	3.0 km	MPC · JPL
478293	2011 WO_{18}	—	November 21, 2006	Mount Lemmon	Mount Lemmon Survey	·	2.2 km	MPC · JPL
478294	2011 WQ_{19}	—	April 19, 2010	WISE	WISE	·	2.6 km	MPC · JPL
478295	2011 WY_{22}	—	October 23, 2011	Kitt Peak	Spacewatch	·	1.8 km	MPC · JPL
478296	2011 WH_{23}	—	November 17, 2011	Mount Lemmon	Mount Lemmon Survey	EMA	3.1 km	MPC · JPL
478297	2011 WS_{23}	—	April 16, 2010	WISE	WISE	LIX	3.0 km	MPC · JPL
478298	2011 WG_{24}	—	October 21, 2011	Mount Lemmon	Mount Lemmon Survey	·	1.7 km	MPC · JPL
478299	2011 WW_{24}	—	November 22, 2006	Mount Lemmon	Mount Lemmon Survey	·	2.4 km	MPC · JPL
478300	2011 WB_{33}	—	November 15, 2006	Kitt Peak	Spacewatch	·	1.5 km	MPC · JPL

== 478301–478400 ==
back to top

Designation			Discovery			Properties		Ref
Permanent	Provisional	Named after	Date	Site	Discoverer(s)	Category	Diam.	Ref
478301	2011 WU_{40}	—	September 28, 2000	Anderson Mesa	LONEOS	·	3.0 km	MPC · JPL
478302	2011 WP_{49}	—	May 14, 2010	WISE	WISE	·	3.9 km	MPC · JPL
478303	2011 WH_{55}	—	April 24, 2003	Kitt Peak	Spacewatch	·	3.1 km	MPC · JPL
478304	2011 WQ_{55}	—	November 18, 2006	Mount Lemmon	Mount Lemmon Survey	·	2.1 km	MPC · JPL
478305	2011 WA_{59}	—	November 17, 1995	Kitt Peak	Spacewatch	·	1.9 km	MPC · JPL
478306	2011 WZ_{64}	—	November 30, 2000	Socorro	LINEAR	·	3.6 km	MPC · JPL
478307	2011 WV_{67}	—	November 4, 2005	Catalina	CSS	·	2.8 km	MPC · JPL
478308	2011 WX_{68}	—	September 29, 2005	Mount Lemmon	Mount Lemmon Survey	·	2.6 km	MPC · JPL
478309	2011 WS_{69}	—	April 14, 2010	WISE	WISE	LIX	3.0 km	MPC · JPL
478310	2011 WD_{71}	—	November 15, 1995	Kitt Peak	Spacewatch	·	2.1 km	MPC · JPL
478311	2011 WS_{72}	—	November 1, 2011	Mount Lemmon	Mount Lemmon Survey	EOS	2.2 km	MPC · JPL
478312	2011 WU_{73}	—	December 24, 2006	Kitt Peak	Spacewatch	VER	2.6 km	MPC · JPL
478313	2011 WZ_{73}	—	November 12, 2006	Mount Lemmon	Mount Lemmon Survey	·	2.1 km	MPC · JPL
478314	2011 WW_{76}	—	October 19, 2011	Kitt Peak	Spacewatch	·	3.3 km	MPC · JPL
478315	2011 WD_{79}	—	December 14, 2006	Kitt Peak	Spacewatch	·	2.0 km	MPC · JPL
478316	2011 WU_{79}	—	September 24, 2011	Mount Lemmon	Mount Lemmon Survey	·	2.1 km	MPC · JPL
478317	2011 WY_{80}	—	September 29, 2005	Mount Lemmon	Mount Lemmon Survey	THM	1.8 km	MPC · JPL
478318	2011 WA_{82}	—	October 30, 2011	Kitt Peak	Spacewatch	·	2.6 km	MPC · JPL
478319	2011 WR_{82}	—	May 28, 2009	Mount Lemmon	Mount Lemmon Survey	·	3.5 km	MPC · JPL
478320	2011 WL_{86}	—	November 27, 2006	Kitt Peak	Spacewatch	·	1.3 km	MPC · JPL
478321	2011 WT_{88}	—	March 13, 2007	Catalina	CSS	·	3.8 km	MPC · JPL
478322	2011 WZ_{89}	—	November 26, 2011	Kitt Peak	Spacewatch	EOS	1.9 km	MPC · JPL
478323	2011 WZ_{92}	—	May 30, 2010	WISE	WISE	·	3.1 km	MPC · JPL
478324	2011 WW_{96}	—	November 23, 2011	Mount Lemmon	Mount Lemmon Survey	·	3.8 km	MPC · JPL
478325	2011 WA_{97}	—	December 12, 2006	Mount Lemmon	Mount Lemmon Survey	THM	1.8 km	MPC · JPL
478326	2011 WS_{97}	—	October 31, 2011	Kitt Peak	Spacewatch	·	2.2 km	MPC · JPL
478327	2011 WY_{103}	—	February 28, 2008	Mount Lemmon	Mount Lemmon Survey	·	3.0 km	MPC · JPL
478328	2011 WA_{104}	—	February 28, 2008	Mount Lemmon	Mount Lemmon Survey	EOS	1.5 km	MPC · JPL
478329	2011 WF_{104}	—	November 3, 2011	Mount Lemmon	Mount Lemmon Survey	·	2.4 km	MPC · JPL
478330	2011 WO_{104}	—	November 3, 2011	Mount Lemmon	Mount Lemmon Survey	·	3.3 km	MPC · JPL
478331	2011 WW_{109}	—	October 30, 2011	Kitt Peak	Spacewatch	·	2.6 km	MPC · JPL
478332	2011 WD_{110}	—	October 29, 2005	Kitt Peak	Spacewatch	·	2.7 km	MPC · JPL
478333	2011 WU_{113}	—	October 31, 2005	Kitt Peak	Spacewatch	·	4.5 km	MPC · JPL
478334	2011 WB_{116}	—	November 16, 2011	Mount Lemmon	Mount Lemmon Survey	·	2.2 km	MPC · JPL
478335	2011 WG_{118}	—	December 1, 2006	Mount Lemmon	Mount Lemmon Survey	·	2.3 km	MPC · JPL
478336	2011 WM_{120}	—	November 19, 2006	Catalina	CSS	·	1.8 km	MPC · JPL
478337	2011 WG_{127}	—	October 27, 2005	Kitt Peak	Spacewatch	·	2.9 km	MPC · JPL
478338	2011 WV_{128}	—	October 21, 2011	Mount Lemmon	Mount Lemmon Survey	·	2.2 km	MPC · JPL
478339	2011 WU_{129}	—	September 1, 2010	Mount Lemmon	Mount Lemmon Survey	·	3.5 km	MPC · JPL
478340	2011 WE_{130}	—	November 23, 2011	Catalina	CSS	·	2.4 km	MPC · JPL
478341	2011 WR_{130}	—	June 5, 2010	WISE	WISE	·	4.5 km	MPC · JPL
478342	2011 WB_{135}	—	November 17, 2011	Mount Lemmon	Mount Lemmon Survey	·	3.9 km	MPC · JPL
478343	2011 WF_{135}	—	April 11, 2008	Kitt Peak	Spacewatch	·	2.9 km	MPC · JPL
478344	2011 WE_{136}	—	May 28, 2010	WISE	WISE	·	4.0 km	MPC · JPL
478345	2011 WT_{136}	—	March 1, 2008	Kitt Peak	Spacewatch	·	2.0 km	MPC · JPL
478346	2011 WU_{136}	—	September 11, 2005	Kitt Peak	Spacewatch	EOS	1.8 km	MPC · JPL
478347	2011 WX_{136}	—	October 28, 2011	Mount Lemmon	Mount Lemmon Survey	·	2.6 km	MPC · JPL
478348	2011 WZ_{136}	—	May 8, 2010	WISE	WISE	·	2.5 km	MPC · JPL
478349	2011 WR_{138}	—	October 21, 2011	Mount Lemmon	Mount Lemmon Survey	EOS	1.8 km	MPC · JPL
478350	2011 WZ_{140}	—	June 9, 2010	WISE	WISE	·	3.8 km	MPC · JPL
478351	2011 WV_{141}	—	September 30, 2005	Mount Lemmon	Mount Lemmon Survey	THM	1.8 km	MPC · JPL
478352	2011 WT_{143}	—	November 24, 2006	Mount Lemmon	Mount Lemmon Survey	·	1.8 km	MPC · JPL
478353	2011 WA_{150}	—	December 17, 2007	Kitt Peak	Spacewatch	·	2.1 km	MPC · JPL
478354	2011 WY_{150}	—	February 12, 2008	Mount Lemmon	Mount Lemmon Survey	·	2.5 km	MPC · JPL
478355	2011 WQ_{151}	—	March 2, 2008	Mount Lemmon	Mount Lemmon Survey	·	3.7 km	MPC · JPL
478356	2011 XW_{2}	—	October 31, 2011	Mount Lemmon	Mount Lemmon Survey	H	500 m	MPC · JPL
478357	2011 YZ_{1}	—	April 5, 2008	Mount Lemmon	Mount Lemmon Survey	·	3.0 km	MPC · JPL
478358	2011 YJ_{3}	—	June 19, 2010	Kitt Peak	Spacewatch	·	5.0 km	MPC · JPL
478359	2011 YR_{7}	—	November 25, 2005	Catalina	CSS	LIX	3.7 km	MPC · JPL
478360	2011 YP_{8}	—	October 27, 2005	Mount Lemmon	Mount Lemmon Survey	·	3.1 km	MPC · JPL
478361	2011 YY_{19}	—	July 28, 2010	WISE	WISE	TIR	3.1 km	MPC · JPL
478362	2011 YR_{23}	—	October 22, 2011	Mount Lemmon	Mount Lemmon Survey	·	3.0 km	MPC · JPL
478363	2011 YX_{23}	—	March 14, 2007	Anderson Mesa	LONEOS	·	2.3 km	MPC · JPL
478364	2011 YW_{24}	—	December 31, 1994	Kitt Peak	Spacewatch	·	2.7 km	MPC · JPL
478365	2011 YP_{25}	—	December 25, 2011	Kitt Peak	Spacewatch	TIR	3.0 km	MPC · JPL
478366	2011 YW_{30}	—	January 10, 2007	Mount Lemmon	Mount Lemmon Survey	·	3.2 km	MPC · JPL
478367	2011 YB_{36}	—	September 15, 2010	Kitt Peak	Spacewatch	·	2.4 km	MPC · JPL
478368	2011 YN_{37}	—	December 26, 2011	Kitt Peak	Spacewatch	H	650 m	MPC · JPL
478369	2011 YU_{45}	—	July 18, 2010	WISE	WISE	·	2.8 km	MPC · JPL
478370	2011 YK_{48}	—	December 29, 2011	Mount Lemmon	Mount Lemmon Survey	H	400 m	MPC · JPL
478371	2011 YF_{55}	—	October 9, 2005	Kitt Peak	Spacewatch	·	1.8 km	MPC · JPL
478372	2011 YW_{56}	—	December 5, 2005	Kitt Peak	Spacewatch	·	2.6 km	MPC · JPL
478373	2011 YX_{56}	—	December 29, 2005	Kitt Peak	Spacewatch	·	2.7 km	MPC · JPL
478374	2011 YA_{62}	—	October 31, 2005	Anderson Mesa	LONEOS	·	3.5 km	MPC · JPL
478375	2011 YK_{70}	—	December 27, 2011	Catalina	CSS	H	590 m	MPC · JPL
478376	2011 YS_{71}	—	November 27, 2011	Mount Lemmon	Mount Lemmon Survey	·	2.7 km	MPC · JPL
478377	2012 AJ_{6}	—	December 22, 2005	Catalina	CSS	T_{j} (2.97)	4.8 km	MPC · JPL
478378	2012 AR_{11}	—	August 30, 2005	Kitt Peak	Spacewatch	H	610 m	MPC · JPL
478379	2012 AS_{11}	—	December 14, 2006	Catalina	CSS	·	2.3 km	MPC · JPL
478380	2012 AS_{18}	—	February 13, 2004	Kitt Peak	Spacewatch	H	550 m	MPC · JPL
478381	2012 AK_{22}	—	March 14, 2007	Kitt Peak	Spacewatch	·	2.9 km	MPC · JPL
478382	2012 AU_{22}	—	January 1, 2012	Catalina	CSS	H	690 m	MPC · JPL
478383	2012 BZ	—	November 30, 2005	Mount Lemmon	Mount Lemmon Survey	·	4.4 km	MPC · JPL
478384	2012 BE_{2}	—	July 16, 2010	WISE	WISE	·	4.0 km	MPC · JPL
478385	2012 BP_{13}	—	August 29, 1995	Kitt Peak	Spacewatch	·	370 m	MPC · JPL
478386	2012 BK_{16}	—	November 1, 2005	Mount Lemmon	Mount Lemmon Survey	·	2.1 km	MPC · JPL
478387	2012 BF_{22}	—	August 31, 2005	Kitt Peak	Spacewatch	·	1.7 km	MPC · JPL
478388	2012 BQ_{26}	—	December 25, 2005	Mount Lemmon	Mount Lemmon Survey	·	3.1 km	MPC · JPL
478389	2012 BH_{27}	—	January 18, 2012	Catalina	CSS	H	570 m	MPC · JPL
478390	2012 BG_{29}	—	December 24, 2011	Mount Lemmon	Mount Lemmon Survey	·	3.9 km	MPC · JPL
478391	2012 BN_{32}	—	August 8, 2010	WISE	WISE	·	5.4 km	MPC · JPL
478392	2012 BB_{59}	—	December 31, 2011	Kitt Peak	Spacewatch	H	490 m	MPC · JPL
478393	2012 BK_{65}	—	August 6, 2010	WISE	WISE	CYB	4.4 km	MPC · JPL
478394	2012 BC_{66}	—	September 17, 2010	Mount Lemmon	Mount Lemmon Survey	HYG	2.5 km	MPC · JPL
478395	2012 BW_{67}	—	July 6, 2010	WISE	WISE	·	3.0 km	MPC · JPL
478396	2012 BU_{72}	—	July 15, 2010	WISE	WISE	T_{j} (2.97)	3.5 km	MPC · JPL
478397	2012 BX_{86}	—	December 3, 1999	Kitt Peak	Spacewatch	·	3.4 km	MPC · JPL
478398	2012 BD_{97}	—	October 6, 2005	Kitt Peak	Spacewatch	T_{j} (2.97)	2.7 km	MPC · JPL
478399	2012 BD_{98}	—	January 30, 2012	Mount Lemmon	Mount Lemmon Survey	H	560 m	MPC · JPL
478400	2012 BJ_{103}	—	July 26, 2010	WISE	WISE	(1118)	3.6 km	MPC · JPL

== 478401–478500 ==
back to top

Designation			Discovery			Properties		Ref
Permanent	Provisional	Named after	Date	Site	Discoverer(s)	Category	Diam.	Ref
478401	2012 BX_{106}	—	January 18, 2012	Kitt Peak	Spacewatch	H	530 m	MPC · JPL
478402	2012 BE_{128}	—	July 22, 2010	WISE	WISE	LIX	4.2 km	MPC · JPL
478403	2012 BW_{131}	—	July 15, 2010	WISE	WISE	·	3.7 km	MPC · JPL
478404	2012 BJ_{132}	—	November 12, 1999	Socorro	LINEAR	T_{j} (2.99)	3.8 km	MPC · JPL
478405	2012 BQ_{146}	—	January 19, 2012	Kitt Peak	Spacewatch	H	430 m	MPC · JPL
478406	2012 CB	—	November 22, 2000	Kitt Peak	Spacewatch	·	2.7 km	MPC · JPL
478407	2012 CQ	—	January 29, 2012	Kitt Peak	Spacewatch	H	640 m	MPC · JPL
478408	2012 CQ_{18}	—	April 26, 2007	Mount Lemmon	Mount Lemmon Survey	·	3.3 km	MPC · JPL
478409	2012 CK_{33}	—	September 11, 2010	Kitt Peak	Spacewatch	·	2.6 km	MPC · JPL
478410	2012 CZ_{42}	—	October 11, 2010	Mount Lemmon	Mount Lemmon Survey	·	2.6 km	MPC · JPL
478411	2012 CC_{44}	—	January 2, 2012	Catalina	CSS	H	520 m	MPC · JPL
478412	2012 CF_{55}	—	December 6, 2005	Kitt Peak	Spacewatch	·	3.1 km	MPC · JPL
478413	2012 DG	—	November 1, 2011	Mount Lemmon	Mount Lemmon Survey	CYB	4.5 km	MPC · JPL
478414	2012 DU	—	December 17, 2000	Socorro	LINEAR	·	2.8 km	MPC · JPL
478415	2012 DB_{16}	—	February 3, 2012	Mount Lemmon	Mount Lemmon Survey	·	3.3 km	MPC · JPL
478416	2012 DE_{97}	—	March 25, 2007	Mount Lemmon	Mount Lemmon Survey	·	3.3 km	MPC · JPL
478417	2012 EB_{3}	—	February 23, 2012	Kitt Peak	Spacewatch	·	640 m	MPC · JPL
478418	2012 EU_{3}	—	January 29, 2009	Mount Lemmon	Mount Lemmon Survey	·	1.1 km	MPC · JPL
478419	2012 FK_{65}	—	April 18, 2009	Kitt Peak	Spacewatch	·	660 m	MPC · JPL
478420	2012 FP_{67}	—	March 27, 2012	Kitt Peak	Spacewatch	·	560 m	MPC · JPL
478421	2012 GA_{3}	—	October 28, 2010	Mount Lemmon	Mount Lemmon Survey	·	530 m	MPC · JPL
478422	2012 GG_{5}	—	June 16, 2009	Mount Lemmon	Mount Lemmon Survey	·	630 m	MPC · JPL
478423	2012 GX_{26}	—	March 23, 2012	Kitt Peak	Spacewatch	·	550 m	MPC · JPL
478424	2012 GC_{40}	—	February 24, 2012	Catalina	CSS	H	650 m	MPC · JPL
478425	2012 HS_{5}	—	March 31, 2012	Mount Lemmon	Mount Lemmon Survey	·	740 m	MPC · JPL
478426	2012 HW_{6}	—	March 28, 2012	Kitt Peak	Spacewatch	·	660 m	MPC · JPL
478427	2012 HE_{21}	—	April 20, 2012	Mount Lemmon	Mount Lemmon Survey	·	820 m	MPC · JPL
478428	2012 HN_{21}	—	April 1, 2012	Kitt Peak	Spacewatch	·	620 m	MPC · JPL
478429	2012 HE_{28}	—	October 17, 2009	Mount Lemmon	Mount Lemmon Survey	·	650 m	MPC · JPL
478430	2012 HN_{34}	—	March 14, 2007	Mount Lemmon	Mount Lemmon Survey	H	580 m	MPC · JPL
478431	2012 HX_{38}	—	April 19, 2012	Kitt Peak	Spacewatch	·	700 m	MPC · JPL
478432	2012 HS_{39}	—	March 24, 2012	Kitt Peak	Spacewatch	·	880 m	MPC · JPL
478433	2012 HT_{52}	—	March 17, 2005	Kitt Peak	Spacewatch	·	630 m	MPC · JPL
478434	2012 HA_{58}	—	April 17, 2012	Kitt Peak	Spacewatch	·	1.0 km	MPC · JPL
478435	2012 HF_{66}	—	April 21, 2012	Kitt Peak	Spacewatch	·	680 m	MPC · JPL
478436	2012 HY_{67}	—	September 15, 2009	Kitt Peak	Spacewatch	·	870 m	MPC · JPL
478437	2012 HB_{72}	—	March 27, 2012	Kitt Peak	Spacewatch	·	640 m	MPC · JPL
478438	2012 HA_{73}	—	April 11, 2005	Mount Lemmon	Mount Lemmon Survey	·	700 m	MPC · JPL
478439	2012 HB_{79}	—	May 30, 2006	Mount Lemmon	Mount Lemmon Survey	·	700 m	MPC · JPL
478440	2012 JH_{21}	—	April 9, 2005	Kitt Peak	Spacewatch	·	670 m	MPC · JPL
478441	2012 JJ_{21}	—	April 20, 2012	Kitt Peak	Spacewatch	·	620 m	MPC · JPL
478442	2012 JZ_{25}	—	April 16, 2012	Kitt Peak	Spacewatch	·	790 m	MPC · JPL
478443	2012 JU_{66}	—	June 17, 2009	Mount Lemmon	Mount Lemmon Survey	PHO	780 m	MPC · JPL
478444	2012 KR	—	January 10, 2008	Mount Lemmon	Mount Lemmon Survey	·	820 m	MPC · JPL
478445	2012 KZ_{4}	—	September 23, 2009	Mount Lemmon	Mount Lemmon Survey	·	580 m	MPC · JPL
478446	2012 KT_{11}	—	April 23, 2012	Kitt Peak	Spacewatch	·	1 km	MPC · JPL
478447	2012 KR_{12}	—	June 23, 2009	Mount Lemmon	Mount Lemmon Survey	·	520 m	MPC · JPL
478448	2012 KQ_{43}	—	September 16, 2009	Kitt Peak	Spacewatch	·	610 m	MPC · JPL
478449	2012 KN_{44}	—	May 21, 2005	Mount Lemmon	Mount Lemmon Survey	·	690 m	MPC · JPL
478450	2012 KJ_{45}	—	May 30, 2012	Siding Spring	SSS	·	1.6 km	MPC · JPL
478451	2012 KF_{48}	—	November 11, 2009	Mount Lemmon	Mount Lemmon Survey	·	860 m	MPC · JPL
478452	2012 LK	—	September 22, 2009	Mount Lemmon	Mount Lemmon Survey	·	880 m	MPC · JPL
478453	2012 LT_{4}	—	June 10, 2012	Siding Spring	SSS	PHO	1.2 km	MPC · JPL
478454	2012 LZ_{7}	—	July 28, 2009	Kitt Peak	Spacewatch	·	580 m	MPC · JPL
478455	2012 NV_{1}	—	July 15, 2012	Siding Spring	SSS	PHO	1.0 km	MPC · JPL
478456	2012 OY_{1}	—	September 23, 2005	Catalina	CSS	V	560 m	MPC · JPL
478457	2012 OV_{2}	—	June 23, 2012	Mount Lemmon	Mount Lemmon Survey	NYS	1.2 km	MPC · JPL
478458	2012 PB_{14}	—	August 10, 2012	Kitt Peak	Spacewatch	·	1.2 km	MPC · JPL
478459	2012 PF_{16}	—	May 28, 2012	Mount Lemmon	Mount Lemmon Survey	·	1.2 km	MPC · JPL
478460	2012 PY_{31}	—	February 26, 2011	Mount Lemmon	Mount Lemmon Survey	·	860 m	MPC · JPL
478461	2012 PB_{34}	—	October 17, 2009	Mount Lemmon	Mount Lemmon Survey	V	620 m	MPC · JPL
478462	2012 PN_{38}	—	January 28, 2011	Mount Lemmon	Mount Lemmon Survey	·	1.1 km	MPC · JPL
478463	2012 QO_{3}	—	November 17, 1995	Kitt Peak	Spacewatch	·	740 m	MPC · JPL
478464	2012 QT_{13}	—	February 20, 2006	Mount Lemmon	Mount Lemmon Survey	·	1.2 km	MPC · JPL
478465	2012 QS_{14}	—	May 15, 2008	Mount Lemmon	Mount Lemmon Survey	·	1.4 km	MPC · JPL
478466	2012 QG_{15}	—	April 24, 2011	Mount Lemmon	Mount Lemmon Survey	·	940 m	MPC · JPL
478467	2012 QF_{20}	—	September 19, 2001	Socorro	LINEAR	·	1.1 km	MPC · JPL
478468	2012 QS_{20}	—	November 25, 2005	Kitt Peak	Spacewatch	·	1.1 km	MPC · JPL
478469	2012 QJ_{22}	—	September 5, 2008	Kitt Peak	Spacewatch	·	740 m	MPC · JPL
478470	2012 QP_{22}	—	November 6, 2005	Mount Lemmon	Mount Lemmon Survey	·	1.1 km	MPC · JPL
478471	2012 QH_{23}	—	September 19, 2001	Kitt Peak	Spacewatch	V	560 m	MPC · JPL
478472	2012 QJ_{23}	—	August 14, 2012	Kitt Peak	Spacewatch	MAR	1.0 km	MPC · JPL
478473	2012 QU_{24}	—	August 24, 2012	Kitt Peak	Spacewatch	·	1.3 km	MPC · JPL
478474	2012 QK_{26}	—	September 4, 2008	Kitt Peak	Spacewatch	·	1.1 km	MPC · JPL
478475	2012 QW_{27}	—	March 10, 2002	Kitt Peak	Spacewatch	·	1.3 km	MPC · JPL
478476	2012 QA_{32}	—	April 14, 2007	Kitt Peak	Spacewatch	·	1.2 km	MPC · JPL
478477	2012 QJ_{33}	—	July 29, 2008	Kitt Peak	Spacewatch	·	1.2 km	MPC · JPL
478478	2012 QC_{36}	—	April 22, 2007	Kitt Peak	Spacewatch	·	1.4 km	MPC · JPL
478479	2012 QL_{48}	—	December 19, 2009	Mount Lemmon	Mount Lemmon Survey	·	1.2 km	MPC · JPL
478480	2012 QT_{49}	—	April 8, 2003	Kitt Peak	Spacewatch	·	1.4 km	MPC · JPL
478481	2012 QH_{51}	—	February 25, 2011	Mount Lemmon	Mount Lemmon Survey	PHO	880 m	MPC · JPL
478482	2012 RV_{1}	—	September 4, 2008	Kitt Peak	Spacewatch	·	1.1 km	MPC · JPL
478483	2012 RT_{2}	—	August 25, 2001	Kitt Peak	Spacewatch	MAS	650 m	MPC · JPL
478484	2012 RP_{3}	—	January 5, 2006	Kitt Peak	Spacewatch	·	1.9 km	MPC · JPL
478485	2012 RW_{5}	—	January 24, 2011	Mount Lemmon	Mount Lemmon Survey	·	1 km	MPC · JPL
478486	2012 RV_{7}	—	September 20, 2008	Catalina	CSS	·	920 m	MPC · JPL
478487	2012 RA_{18}	—	September 24, 2008	Kitt Peak	Spacewatch	·	870 m	MPC · JPL
478488	2012 RS_{21}	—	August 7, 2008	Kitt Peak	Spacewatch	·	910 m	MPC · JPL
478489	2012 RY_{21}	—	September 23, 2008	Kitt Peak	Spacewatch	·	1.3 km	MPC · JPL
478490	2012 RT_{22}	—	January 27, 2006	Kitt Peak	Spacewatch	·	980 m	MPC · JPL
478491	2012 RY_{27}	—	November 10, 2005	Mount Lemmon	Mount Lemmon Survey	·	1.3 km	MPC · JPL
478492	2012 RR_{31}	—	August 23, 2008	Kitt Peak	Spacewatch	·	850 m	MPC · JPL
478493	2012 RP_{32}	—	September 15, 2012	Catalina	CSS	·	1.7 km	MPC · JPL
478494	2012 RC_{33}	—	September 3, 2008	Kitt Peak	Spacewatch	·	830 m	MPC · JPL
478495	2012 RT_{37}	—	September 23, 2008	Kitt Peak	Spacewatch	·	1.3 km	MPC · JPL
478496	2012 RB_{40}	—	December 30, 2005	Kitt Peak	Spacewatch	·	1.4 km	MPC · JPL
478497	2012 RE_{40}	—	November 3, 2008	Mount Lemmon	Mount Lemmon Survey	·	1.2 km	MPC · JPL
478498	2012 SO_{3}	—	September 7, 2008	Catalina	CSS	·	1.4 km	MPC · JPL
478499	2012 SQ_{6}	—	June 23, 2012	Mount Lemmon	Mount Lemmon Survey	NYS	1.1 km	MPC · JPL
478500	2012 SM_{12}	—	November 12, 2001	Socorro	LINEAR	NYS	1.2 km	MPC · JPL

== 478501–478600 ==
back to top

Designation			Discovery			Properties		Ref
Permanent	Provisional	Named after	Date	Site	Discoverer(s)	Category	Diam.	Ref
478501	2012 SC_{13}	—	December 5, 2005	Mount Lemmon	Mount Lemmon Survey	·	1.1 km	MPC · JPL
478502	2012 SJ_{17}	—	October 4, 2004	Kitt Peak	Spacewatch	·	950 m	MPC · JPL
478503	2012 SY_{17}	—	December 1, 2008	Mount Lemmon	Mount Lemmon Survey	·	1.5 km	MPC · JPL
478504	2012 SN_{19}	—	September 18, 2001	Kitt Peak	Spacewatch	·	860 m	MPC · JPL
478505	2012 SW_{21}	—	September 3, 2008	Kitt Peak	Spacewatch	·	1.2 km	MPC · JPL
478506	2012 SA_{23}	—	September 17, 2012	Mount Lemmon	Mount Lemmon Survey	·	1.0 km	MPC · JPL
478507	2012 SQ_{27}	—	September 18, 2012	Kitt Peak	Spacewatch	NYS	1.1 km	MPC · JPL
478508	2012 SV_{28}	—	April 2, 2011	Mount Lemmon	Mount Lemmon Survey	·	1.3 km	MPC · JPL
478509	2012 SH_{29}	—	September 17, 2012	Mount Lemmon	Mount Lemmon Survey	·	900 m	MPC · JPL
478510	2012 SZ_{29}	—	October 22, 2005	Kitt Peak	Spacewatch	·	940 m	MPC · JPL
478511	2012 SZ_{30}	—	September 16, 2012	Kitt Peak	Spacewatch	·	1.4 km	MPC · JPL
478512	2012 SC_{31}	—	April 2, 2006	Kitt Peak	Spacewatch	·	1.7 km	MPC · JPL
478513	2012 SR_{36}	—	March 4, 2011	Kitt Peak	Spacewatch	·	1.1 km	MPC · JPL
478514	2012 ST_{39}	—	September 7, 2008	Mount Lemmon	Mount Lemmon Survey	NYS	980 m	MPC · JPL
478515	2012 SR_{46}	—	September 7, 2008	Mount Lemmon	Mount Lemmon Survey	fast	1.0 km	MPC · JPL
478516	2012 SF_{48}	—	July 30, 2008	Kitt Peak	Spacewatch	MAS	770 m	MPC · JPL
478517	2012 SG_{50}	—	September 21, 2012	Kitt Peak	Spacewatch	·	1.3 km	MPC · JPL
478518	2012 SA_{55}	—	September 19, 2012	Mount Lemmon	Mount Lemmon Survey	·	1.5 km	MPC · JPL
478519	2012 SE_{56}	—	October 26, 2008	Mount Lemmon	Mount Lemmon Survey	·	1.1 km	MPC · JPL
478520	2012 SG_{56}	—	September 17, 2012	Kitt Peak	Spacewatch	·	1.7 km	MPC · JPL
478521	2012 SK_{56}	—	September 25, 2012	Mount Lemmon	Mount Lemmon Survey	MIS	2.6 km	MPC · JPL
478522	2012 SL_{56}	—	September 15, 2012	Kitt Peak	Spacewatch	·	1.8 km	MPC · JPL
478523	2012 SM_{57}	—	September 21, 2012	Kitt Peak	Spacewatch	·	1.5 km	MPC · JPL
478524	2012 SV_{57}	—	September 16, 2012	Kitt Peak	Spacewatch	EUN	1.3 km	MPC · JPL
478525	2012 SL_{58}	—	September 30, 2008	Mount Lemmon	Mount Lemmon Survey	·	1.8 km	MPC · JPL
478526	2012 SU_{60}	—	July 29, 2008	Kitt Peak	Spacewatch	MAS	630 m	MPC · JPL
478527	2012 SW_{60}	—	September 21, 2008	Kitt Peak	Spacewatch	·	1.1 km	MPC · JPL
478528	2012 SY_{64}	—	October 23, 2008	Kitt Peak	Spacewatch	·	1.1 km	MPC · JPL
478529	2012 TG_{1}	—	September 7, 2008	Mount Lemmon	Mount Lemmon Survey	NYS	1.0 km	MPC · JPL
478530	2012 TB_{2}	—	September 6, 2008	Catalina	CSS	·	1.2 km	MPC · JPL
478531	2012 TR_{2}	—	September 16, 2012	Kitt Peak	Spacewatch	·	1.6 km	MPC · JPL
478532	2012 TZ_{5}	—	June 10, 2011	Mount Lemmon	Mount Lemmon Survey	·	1.4 km	MPC · JPL
478533	2012 TX_{7}	—	September 24, 2008	Mount Lemmon	Mount Lemmon Survey	·	1.5 km	MPC · JPL
478534	2012 TP_{9}	—	September 14, 2012	Catalina	CSS	·	2.2 km	MPC · JPL
478535	2012 TW_{10}	—	May 13, 2010	Mount Lemmon	Mount Lemmon Survey	·	1.9 km	MPC · JPL
478536	2012 TP_{11}	—	October 7, 2008	Kitt Peak	Spacewatch	·	640 m	MPC · JPL
478537	2012 TZ_{12}	—	March 24, 2006	Mount Lemmon	Mount Lemmon Survey	·	1.8 km	MPC · JPL
478538	2012 TK_{14}	—	December 27, 2003	Socorro	LINEAR	·	2.4 km	MPC · JPL
478539	2012 TB_{17}	—	April 19, 2007	Kitt Peak	Spacewatch	·	1.5 km	MPC · JPL
478540	2012 TU_{17}	—	October 21, 2008	Kitt Peak	Spacewatch	(5)	1.2 km	MPC · JPL
478541	2012 TZ_{17}	—	September 7, 2008	Mount Lemmon	Mount Lemmon Survey	NYS	1.0 km	MPC · JPL
478542	2012 TY_{18}	—	April 6, 2010	WISE	WISE	·	1.5 km	MPC · JPL
478543	2012 TK_{22}	—	September 16, 2003	Kitt Peak	Spacewatch	·	1.8 km	MPC · JPL
478544	2012 TB_{23}	—	September 4, 2008	Kitt Peak	Spacewatch	·	970 m	MPC · JPL
478545	2012 TM_{25}	—	October 4, 2012	Mount Lemmon	Mount Lemmon Survey	·	1.4 km	MPC · JPL
478546	2012 TU_{25}	—	August 6, 2008	Siding Spring	SSS	·	1.4 km	MPC · JPL
478547	2012 TF_{26}	—	September 22, 2008	Kitt Peak	Spacewatch	·	1.0 km	MPC · JPL
478548	2012 TE_{32}	—	December 12, 2004	Kitt Peak	Spacewatch	·	1.2 km	MPC · JPL
478549	2012 TB_{33}	—	September 25, 2008	Kitt Peak	Spacewatch	MAR	860 m	MPC · JPL
478550	2012 TR_{34}	—	February 4, 2005	Kitt Peak	Spacewatch	·	1.3 km	MPC · JPL
478551	2012 TU_{34}	—	February 17, 2010	Kitt Peak	Spacewatch	WIT	740 m	MPC · JPL
478552	2012 TW_{34}	—	October 24, 2008	Kitt Peak	Spacewatch	·	1.1 km	MPC · JPL
478553	2012 TX_{36}	—	September 20, 2008	Mount Lemmon	Mount Lemmon Survey	·	1.4 km	MPC · JPL
478554	2012 TW_{37}	—	October 7, 2004	Kitt Peak	Spacewatch	·	390 m	MPC · JPL
478555	2012 TT_{39}	—	September 14, 2012	Catalina	CSS	MAR	1.4 km	MPC · JPL
478556	2012 TJ_{40}	—	September 24, 2012	Kitt Peak	Spacewatch	·	1.6 km	MPC · JPL
478557	2012 TS_{40}	—	July 29, 2008	Mount Lemmon	Mount Lemmon Survey	·	940 m	MPC · JPL
478558	2012 TB_{47}	—	December 24, 2005	Kitt Peak	Spacewatch	·	1.2 km	MPC · JPL
478559	2012 TH_{56}	—	October 6, 2012	Kitt Peak	Spacewatch	·	1.6 km	MPC · JPL
478560	2012 TJ_{56}	—	November 11, 2004	Kitt Peak	Spacewatch	·	1.3 km	MPC · JPL
478561	2012 TA_{57}	—	April 24, 2006	Mount Lemmon	Mount Lemmon Survey	·	2.0 km	MPC · JPL
478562	2012 TG_{60}	—	October 8, 2012	Mount Lemmon	Mount Lemmon Survey	·	1.3 km	MPC · JPL
478563	2012 TM_{64}	—	September 24, 2008	Kitt Peak	Spacewatch	·	920 m	MPC · JPL
478564	2012 TP_{66}	—	August 28, 2012	Mount Lemmon	Mount Lemmon Survey	MAR	870 m	MPC · JPL
478565	2012 TQ_{66}	—	October 2, 2003	Kitt Peak	Spacewatch	·	1.7 km	MPC · JPL
478566	2012 TK_{67}	—	October 25, 2008	Kitt Peak	Spacewatch	·	1.1 km	MPC · JPL
478567	2012 TL_{67}	—	October 8, 2012	Mount Lemmon	Mount Lemmon Survey	·	1.9 km	MPC · JPL
478568	2012 TY_{67}	—	August 28, 2012	Mount Lemmon	Mount Lemmon Survey	·	1.2 km	MPC · JPL
478569	2012 TR_{68}	—	September 22, 1995	Kitt Peak	Spacewatch	·	1.2 km	MPC · JPL
478570	2012 TZ_{68}	—	April 18, 2007	Kitt Peak	Spacewatch	·	960 m	MPC · JPL
478571	2012 TZ_{69}	—	October 9, 2008	Kitt Peak	Spacewatch	(5)	970 m	MPC · JPL
478572	2012 TT_{73}	—	October 29, 2008	Kitt Peak	Spacewatch	·	1.3 km	MPC · JPL
478573	2012 TF_{77}	—	April 30, 2006	Kitt Peak	Spacewatch	·	1.5 km	MPC · JPL
478574	2012 TS_{78}	—	October 8, 2012	Mount Lemmon	Mount Lemmon Survey	APO · PHA	680 m	MPC · JPL
478575	2012 TQ_{79}	—	May 7, 2010	WISE	WISE	L5	7.1 km	MPC · JPL
478576	2012 TF_{81}	—	March 6, 2011	Mount Lemmon	Mount Lemmon Survey	·	1.0 km	MPC · JPL
478577	2012 TU_{85}	—	March 28, 2011	Kitt Peak	Spacewatch	·	1.3 km	MPC · JPL
478578	2012 TF_{86}	—	September 12, 2007	Mount Lemmon	Mount Lemmon Survey	·	2.0 km	MPC · JPL
478579	2012 TZ_{90}	—	May 23, 2011	Mount Lemmon	Mount Lemmon Survey	·	1.4 km	MPC · JPL
478580	2012 TK_{91}	—	March 28, 2011	Mount Lemmon	Mount Lemmon Survey	·	1.1 km	MPC · JPL
478581	2012 TF_{93}	—	September 3, 2008	Kitt Peak	Spacewatch	·	740 m	MPC · JPL
478582	2012 TX_{93}	—	February 27, 2006	Kitt Peak	Spacewatch	·	910 m	MPC · JPL
478583	2012 TE_{96}	—	October 8, 2012	Kitt Peak	Spacewatch	·	1.2 km	MPC · JPL
478584	2012 TR_{96}	—	August 24, 2008	Kitt Peak	Spacewatch	·	1.1 km	MPC · JPL
478585	2012 TX_{96}	—	September 19, 2003	Kitt Peak	Spacewatch	·	1.6 km	MPC · JPL
478586	2012 TL_{100}	—	June 4, 2011	Mount Lemmon	Mount Lemmon Survey	PHO	1.0 km	MPC · JPL
478587	2012 TQ_{102}	—	January 12, 2010	Kitt Peak	Spacewatch	·	1.3 km	MPC · JPL
478588	2012 TC_{104}	—	October 8, 2008	Mount Lemmon	Mount Lemmon Survey	RAF	750 m	MPC · JPL
478589	2012 TK_{109}	—	October 9, 2008	Mount Lemmon	Mount Lemmon Survey	·	1.5 km	MPC · JPL
478590	2012 TD_{111}	—	October 10, 2008	Mount Lemmon	Mount Lemmon Survey	RAF	750 m	MPC · JPL
478591	2012 TR_{111}	—	January 23, 2006	Mount Lemmon	Mount Lemmon Survey	·	1.2 km	MPC · JPL
478592	2012 TL_{114}	—	September 25, 2012	Kitt Peak	Spacewatch	·	1.4 km	MPC · JPL
478593	2012 TQ_{115}	—	December 5, 2005	Mount Lemmon	Mount Lemmon Survey	V	730 m	MPC · JPL
478594	2012 TF_{117}	—	October 10, 2012	Mount Lemmon	Mount Lemmon Survey	·	1.3 km	MPC · JPL
478595	2012 TP_{119}	—	November 18, 2008	Kitt Peak	Spacewatch	WIT	880 m	MPC · JPL
478596	2012 TC_{122}	—	October 2, 1999	Kitt Peak	Spacewatch	·	1.3 km	MPC · JPL
478597	2012 TD_{127}	—	September 23, 2005	Kitt Peak	Spacewatch	PHO	2.2 km	MPC · JPL
478598	2012 TA_{128}	—	November 2, 2008	Mount Lemmon	Mount Lemmon Survey	·	1.1 km	MPC · JPL
478599	2012 TJ_{129}	—	December 5, 2005	Kitt Peak	Spacewatch	NYS	1.3 km	MPC · JPL
478600	2012 TA_{130}	—	September 16, 2012	Catalina	CSS	·	1.6 km	MPC · JPL

== 478601–478700 ==
back to top

Designation			Discovery			Properties		Ref
Permanent	Provisional	Named after	Date	Site	Discoverer(s)	Category	Diam.	Ref
478601	2012 TQ_{130}	—	September 15, 2012	Mount Lemmon	Mount Lemmon Survey	·	2.7 km	MPC · JPL
478602	2012 TJ_{132}	—	October 10, 2012	Mount Lemmon	Mount Lemmon Survey	JUN	1.1 km	MPC · JPL
478603	2012 TD_{137}	—	February 4, 2006	Mount Lemmon	Mount Lemmon Survey	·	850 m	MPC · JPL
478604	2012 TL_{137}	—	June 23, 2012	Mount Lemmon	Mount Lemmon Survey	·	1.1 km	MPC · JPL
478605	2012 TT_{138}	—	October 27, 2008	Kitt Peak	Spacewatch	·	1.3 km	MPC · JPL
478606	2012 TN_{141}	—	July 29, 2008	Kitt Peak	Spacewatch	·	1.0 km	MPC · JPL
478607	2012 TX_{143}	—	May 2, 2006	Mount Lemmon	Mount Lemmon Survey	·	1.3 km	MPC · JPL
478608	2012 TM_{145}	—	October 10, 2012	Mount Lemmon	Mount Lemmon Survey	EUN	1.4 km	MPC · JPL
478609	2012 TN_{150}	—	October 8, 2012	Mount Lemmon	Mount Lemmon Survey	·	1.1 km	MPC · JPL
478610	2012 TY_{150}	—	September 11, 2007	Mount Lemmon	Mount Lemmon Survey	AGN	1.1 km	MPC · JPL
478611	2012 TL_{151}	—	December 1, 2008	Kitt Peak	Spacewatch	·	1.3 km	MPC · JPL
478612	2012 TZ_{151}	—	September 14, 2012	Mount Lemmon	Mount Lemmon Survey	·	1.4 km	MPC · JPL
478613	2012 TB_{157}	—	September 17, 2004	Kitt Peak	Spacewatch	·	790 m	MPC · JPL
478614	2012 TF_{157}	—	October 22, 2003	Kitt Peak	Spacewatch	AGN	960 m	MPC · JPL
478615	2012 TP_{157}	—	August 30, 2003	Kitt Peak	Spacewatch	·	1.3 km	MPC · JPL
478616	2012 TT_{157}	—	September 15, 2012	Kitt Peak	Spacewatch	V	780 m	MPC · JPL
478617	2012 TB_{160}	—	September 27, 2008	Mount Lemmon	Mount Lemmon Survey	·	1.2 km	MPC · JPL
478618	2012 TU_{162}	—	April 12, 2010	Mount Lemmon	Mount Lemmon Survey	MAR	1.1 km	MPC · JPL
478619	2012 TZ_{163}	—	September 15, 2012	Mount Lemmon	Mount Lemmon Survey	·	1.5 km	MPC · JPL
478620	2012 TU_{165}	—	October 23, 2008	Kitt Peak	Spacewatch	·	780 m	MPC · JPL
478621	2012 TW_{168}	—	October 5, 2012	Kitt Peak	Spacewatch	·	1.2 km	MPC · JPL
478622	2012 TV_{171}	—	October 28, 2008	Mount Lemmon	Mount Lemmon Survey	KON	1.7 km	MPC · JPL
478623	2012 TC_{173}	—	November 6, 2005	Mount Lemmon	Mount Lemmon Survey	CLA	1.6 km	MPC · JPL
478624	2012 TP_{173}	—	October 9, 2012	Mount Lemmon	Mount Lemmon Survey	·	1.3 km	MPC · JPL
478625	2012 TH_{174}	—	April 18, 2007	Mount Lemmon	Mount Lemmon Survey	·	1.0 km	MPC · JPL
478626	2012 TJ_{175}	—	September 20, 1995	Kitt Peak	Spacewatch	·	1.1 km	MPC · JPL
478627	2012 TS_{176}	—	October 5, 2004	Kitt Peak	Spacewatch	·	830 m	MPC · JPL
478628	2012 TQ_{178}	—	October 17, 2003	Kitt Peak	Spacewatch	·	1.4 km	MPC · JPL
478629	2012 TJ_{186}	—	June 5, 2011	Mount Lemmon	Mount Lemmon Survey	·	1.4 km	MPC · JPL
478630	2012 TA_{187}	—	December 2, 2008	Kitt Peak	Spacewatch	·	1.2 km	MPC · JPL
478631	2012 TN_{189}	—	September 27, 2008	Mount Lemmon	Mount Lemmon Survey	·	1.0 km	MPC · JPL
478632	2012 TP_{189}	—	September 25, 2008	Kitt Peak	Spacewatch	MAR	750 m	MPC · JPL
478633	2012 TD_{190}	—	October 21, 2003	Kitt Peak	Spacewatch	·	1.3 km	MPC · JPL
478634	2012 TG_{190}	—	October 1, 2003	Kitt Peak	Spacewatch	·	2.0 km	MPC · JPL
478635	2012 TN_{191}	—	October 4, 2008	Mount Lemmon	Mount Lemmon Survey	(5)	1.1 km	MPC · JPL
478636	2012 TW_{191}	—	October 24, 2008	Catalina	CSS	·	980 m	MPC · JPL
478637	2012 TF_{193}	—	September 11, 2007	Kitt Peak	Spacewatch	·	1.7 km	MPC · JPL
478638	2012 TW_{193}	—	September 30, 1995	Kitt Peak	Spacewatch	·	990 m	MPC · JPL
478639	2012 TT_{194}	—	April 8, 2010	Mount Lemmon	Mount Lemmon Survey	·	1.5 km	MPC · JPL
478640	2012 TD_{195}	—	April 23, 2007	Kitt Peak	Spacewatch	·	1.1 km	MPC · JPL
478641	2012 TY_{195}	—	November 9, 1999	Socorro	LINEAR	·	1.4 km	MPC · JPL
478642	2012 TM_{196}	—	September 11, 2007	Mount Lemmon	Mount Lemmon Survey	·	1.7 km	MPC · JPL
478643	2012 TU_{198}	—	February 19, 2010	Mount Lemmon	Mount Lemmon Survey	·	1.5 km	MPC · JPL
478644	2012 TJ_{199}	—	July 30, 2008	Mount Lemmon	Mount Lemmon Survey	(5)	1.2 km	MPC · JPL
478645	2012 TL_{199}	—	October 7, 2008	Mount Lemmon	Mount Lemmon Survey	·	1.3 km	MPC · JPL
478646	2012 TU_{199}	—	October 12, 1999	Socorro	LINEAR	·	1.8 km	MPC · JPL
478647	2012 TE_{205}	—	December 2, 2008	Kitt Peak	Spacewatch	·	2.0 km	MPC · JPL
478648	2012 TA_{220}	—	September 17, 2012	Kitt Peak	Spacewatch	EUN	1.0 km	MPC · JPL
478649	2012 TA_{228}	—	September 24, 2008	Kitt Peak	Spacewatch	·	1.1 km	MPC · JPL
478650	2012 TL_{230}	—	September 8, 2008	Kitt Peak	Spacewatch	·	1.5 km	MPC · JPL
478651	2012 TQ_{230}	—	September 30, 2008	Catalina	CSS	·	2.9 km	MPC · JPL
478652	2012 TL_{232}	—	January 25, 2006	Kitt Peak	Spacewatch	MAS	710 m	MPC · JPL
478653	2012 TX_{239}	—	September 23, 2008	Mount Lemmon	Mount Lemmon Survey	·	970 m	MPC · JPL
478654	2012 TF_{241}	—	October 8, 2012	Kitt Peak	Spacewatch	·	1.3 km	MPC · JPL
478655	2012 TE_{242}	—	October 16, 1995	Kitt Peak	Spacewatch	EUN	960 m	MPC · JPL
478656	2012 TH_{243}	—	September 9, 2008	Mount Lemmon	Mount Lemmon Survey	·	1.2 km	MPC · JPL
478657	2012 TX_{244}	—	September 16, 2012	Kitt Peak	Spacewatch	·	770 m	MPC · JPL
478658	2012 TY_{245}	—	May 22, 2011	Mount Lemmon	Mount Lemmon Survey	·	1.4 km	MPC · JPL
478659	2012 TJ_{247}	—	November 20, 2008	Mount Lemmon	Mount Lemmon Survey	(5)	1.2 km	MPC · JPL
478660	2012 TQ_{247}	—	December 2, 2008	Kitt Peak	Spacewatch	·	1.6 km	MPC · JPL
478661	2012 TK_{251}	—	October 30, 2008	Catalina	CSS	·	1.0 km	MPC · JPL
478662	2012 TH_{255}	—	October 21, 2008	Kitt Peak	Spacewatch	·	1.1 km	MPC · JPL
478663	2012 TO_{256}	—	August 28, 2012	Mount Lemmon	Mount Lemmon Survey	·	2.2 km	MPC · JPL
478664	2012 TV_{257}	—	March 20, 2010	Mount Lemmon	Mount Lemmon Survey	fast	1.2 km	MPC · JPL
478665	2012 TN_{258}	—	October 27, 2008	Mount Lemmon	Mount Lemmon Survey	·	990 m	MPC · JPL
478666	2012 TP_{258}	—	September 23, 2008	Mount Lemmon	Mount Lemmon Survey	·	1.4 km	MPC · JPL
478667	2012 TD_{263}	—	October 8, 2012	Mount Lemmon	Mount Lemmon Survey	·	1.3 km	MPC · JPL
478668	2012 TL_{263}	—	December 29, 2008	Mount Lemmon	Mount Lemmon Survey	·	1.9 km	MPC · JPL
478669	2012 TV_{276}	—	October 29, 2008	Kitt Peak	Spacewatch	·	1.6 km	MPC · JPL
478670	2012 TZ_{277}	—	October 16, 2003	Kitt Peak	Spacewatch	NEM	2.1 km	MPC · JPL
478671	2012 TS_{280}	—	September 24, 2008	Kitt Peak	Spacewatch	·	960 m	MPC · JPL
478672	2012 TB_{282}	—	October 26, 2008	Kitt Peak	Spacewatch	EUN	870 m	MPC · JPL
478673	2012 TU_{285}	—	December 5, 2008	Kitt Peak	Spacewatch	·	1.1 km	MPC · JPL
478674	2012 TO_{290}	—	November 1, 2008	Mount Lemmon	Mount Lemmon Survey	(5)	1.1 km	MPC · JPL
478675	2012 TQ_{292}	—	October 14, 2012	Kitt Peak	Spacewatch	·	1.3 km	MPC · JPL
478676	2012 TJ_{293}	—	December 29, 2008	Mount Lemmon	Mount Lemmon Survey	·	1.3 km	MPC · JPL
478677	2012 TO_{294}	—	November 7, 2008	Mount Lemmon	Mount Lemmon Survey	·	1.0 km	MPC · JPL
478678	2012 TA_{295}	—	January 20, 2009	Kitt Peak	Spacewatch	·	1.2 km	MPC · JPL
478679	2012 TH_{295}	—	August 25, 1995	Kitt Peak	Spacewatch	KON	1.8 km	MPC · JPL
478680	2012 TA_{300}	—	November 16, 2003	Kitt Peak	Spacewatch	·	1.7 km	MPC · JPL
478681	2012 TL_{301}	—	September 29, 2008	Catalina	CSS	·	980 m	MPC · JPL
478682	2012 TA_{302}	—	October 28, 2005	Kitt Peak	Spacewatch	·	1.5 km	MPC · JPL
478683	2012 TE_{302}	—	August 5, 2008	Siding Spring	SSS	·	1.3 km	MPC · JPL
478684	2012 TY_{307}	—	November 16, 2003	Catalina	CSS	·	1.7 km	MPC · JPL
478685	2012 TB_{311}	—	December 1, 2008	Kitt Peak	Spacewatch	·	1.3 km	MPC · JPL
478686	2012 TD_{313}	—	October 30, 2008	Catalina	CSS	·	1.3 km	MPC · JPL
478687	2012 TE_{313}	—	November 17, 2008	Catalina	CSS	EUN	1.4 km	MPC · JPL
478688	2012 TF_{314}	—	September 19, 2001	Socorro	LINEAR	·	1.1 km	MPC · JPL
478689	2012 TX_{315}	—	August 28, 2012	Mount Lemmon	Mount Lemmon Survey	·	1.5 km	MPC · JPL
478690	2012 UZ_{12}	—	November 18, 1996	Kitt Peak	Spacewatch	·	730 m	MPC · JPL
478691	2012 UD_{15}	—	September 15, 2012	Mount Lemmon	Mount Lemmon Survey	·	1.3 km	MPC · JPL
478692	2012 UT_{19}	—	November 1, 2008	Kitt Peak	Spacewatch	·	1.3 km	MPC · JPL
478693	2012 UY_{20}	—	October 8, 2012	Catalina	CSS	·	1.6 km	MPC · JPL
478694	2012 UV_{25}	—	October 17, 2012	Mount Lemmon	Mount Lemmon Survey	·	1.6 km	MPC · JPL
478695	2012 UE_{28}	—	May 19, 2006	Mount Lemmon	Mount Lemmon Survey	AGN	1.1 km	MPC · JPL
478696	2012 UG_{29}	—	March 2, 2006	Kitt Peak	Spacewatch	MAR	1.2 km	MPC · JPL
478697	2012 UH_{31}	—	October 16, 2012	Kitt Peak	Spacewatch	·	2.4 km	MPC · JPL
478698	2012 UQ_{34}	—	September 7, 2008	Mount Lemmon	Mount Lemmon Survey	SUL	2.1 km	MPC · JPL
478699	2012 UZ_{34}	—	December 30, 2008	Kitt Peak	Spacewatch	·	1.2 km	MPC · JPL
478700	2012 UG_{35}	—	April 27, 2006	Cerro Tololo	Deep Ecliptic Survey	AEO	820 m	MPC · JPL

== 478701–478800 ==
back to top

Designation			Discovery			Properties		Ref
Permanent	Provisional	Named after	Date	Site	Discoverer(s)	Category	Diam.	Ref
478701	2012 UG_{36}	—	October 16, 2012	Kitt Peak	Spacewatch	·	1.3 km	MPC · JPL
478702	2012 UL_{36}	—	October 16, 2012	Kitt Peak	Spacewatch	·	1.1 km	MPC · JPL
478703	2012 UN_{36}	—	October 16, 2012	Kitt Peak	Spacewatch	·	1.4 km	MPC · JPL
478704	2012 UO_{36}	—	November 22, 2008	Kitt Peak	Spacewatch	·	1.4 km	MPC · JPL
478705	2012 UP_{36}	—	October 9, 1999	Kitt Peak	Spacewatch	·	1.5 km	MPC · JPL
478706	2012 UJ_{37}	—	October 16, 2012	Mount Lemmon	Mount Lemmon Survey	·	1.7 km	MPC · JPL
478707	2012 UH_{38}	—	November 2, 2008	Kitt Peak	Spacewatch	·	1.1 km	MPC · JPL
478708	2012 UV_{38}	—	September 22, 2003	Anderson Mesa	LONEOS	·	2.0 km	MPC · JPL
478709	2012 UF_{45}	—	October 20, 2008	Kitt Peak	Spacewatch	ADE	2.0 km	MPC · JPL
478710	2012 UG_{45}	—	January 13, 2005	Kitt Peak	Spacewatch	·	1.1 km	MPC · JPL
478711	2012 UW_{45}	—	October 2, 2008	Kitt Peak	Spacewatch	·	1.2 km	MPC · JPL
478712	2012 UC_{46}	—	October 23, 2008	Mount Lemmon	Mount Lemmon Survey	·	860 m	MPC · JPL
478713	2012 UG_{48}	—	May 22, 2011	Mount Lemmon	Mount Lemmon Survey	·	1.3 km	MPC · JPL
478714	2012 UJ_{48}	—	October 1, 2008	Mount Lemmon	Mount Lemmon Survey	·	640 m	MPC · JPL
478715	2012 UO_{48}	—	September 10, 2007	Kitt Peak	Spacewatch	HOF	2.1 km	MPC · JPL
478716	2012 UU_{48}	—	May 8, 2011	Mount Lemmon	Mount Lemmon Survey	MIS	2.1 km	MPC · JPL
478717	2012 UO_{50}	—	October 8, 2008	Mount Lemmon	Mount Lemmon Survey	·	1.2 km	MPC · JPL
478718	2012 UY_{50}	—	October 24, 2008	Kitt Peak	Spacewatch	·	930 m	MPC · JPL
478719	2012 UD_{53}	—	November 6, 2008	Mount Lemmon	Mount Lemmon Survey	EUN	840 m	MPC · JPL
478720	2012 US_{53}	—	November 19, 2008	Kitt Peak	Spacewatch	·	1.4 km	MPC · JPL
478721	2012 UK_{55}	—	October 5, 2012	Kitt Peak	Spacewatch	·	1.6 km	MPC · JPL
478722	2012 UO_{56}	—	October 15, 2007	Kitt Peak	Spacewatch	AGN	1.0 km	MPC · JPL
478723	2012 UC_{58}	—	December 31, 2008	Catalina	CSS	·	1.4 km	MPC · JPL
478724	2012 UG_{58}	—	September 9, 2008	Mount Lemmon	Mount Lemmon Survey	KON	2.2 km	MPC · JPL
478725	2012 UF_{59}	—	October 24, 2008	Kitt Peak	Spacewatch	·	1.1 km	MPC · JPL
478726	2012 UV_{60}	—	October 3, 2008	Mount Lemmon	Mount Lemmon Survey	EUN	1.4 km	MPC · JPL
478727	2012 UV_{63}	—	November 8, 2008	Mount Lemmon	Mount Lemmon Survey	·	1.4 km	MPC · JPL
478728	2012 UX_{63}	—	October 20, 2012	Mount Lemmon	Mount Lemmon Survey	·	1.4 km	MPC · JPL
478729	2012 UJ_{65}	—	October 16, 2012	Kitt Peak	Spacewatch	MRX	1.1 km	MPC · JPL
478730	2012 UR_{65}	—	January 13, 2005	Catalina	CSS	·	1.0 km	MPC · JPL
478731	2012 UV_{65}	—	May 9, 2011	Mount Lemmon	Mount Lemmon Survey	·	1.5 km	MPC · JPL
478732	2012 UG_{66}	—	April 15, 2010	Mount Lemmon	Mount Lemmon Survey	·	1.4 km	MPC · JPL
478733	2012 UJ_{66}	—	October 16, 2012	Kitt Peak	Spacewatch	·	1.3 km	MPC · JPL
478734	2012 UP_{66}	—	November 4, 2004	Kitt Peak	Spacewatch	·	1.2 km	MPC · JPL
478735	2012 UA_{67}	—	October 14, 2012	Catalina	CSS	·	1.1 km	MPC · JPL
478736	2012 UQ_{67}	—	August 28, 2012	Mount Lemmon	Mount Lemmon Survey	·	1.1 km	MPC · JPL
478737	2012 UQ_{72}	—	October 23, 2008	Kitt Peak	Spacewatch	·	860 m	MPC · JPL
478738	2012 UE_{73}	—	September 18, 2003	Kitt Peak	Spacewatch	·	1.1 km	MPC · JPL
478739	2012 UJ_{73}	—	September 23, 2004	Kitt Peak	Spacewatch	·	1.1 km	MPC · JPL
478740	2012 UK_{76}	—	September 27, 2008	Mount Lemmon	Mount Lemmon Survey	KON	1.6 km	MPC · JPL
478741	2012 UT_{78}	—	October 22, 2008	Kitt Peak	Spacewatch	EUN	1.1 km	MPC · JPL
478742	2012 UV_{78}	—	March 18, 2010	Mount Lemmon	Mount Lemmon Survey	·	1.2 km	MPC · JPL
478743	2012 UK_{80}	—	November 27, 1995	Kitt Peak	Spacewatch	MAR	900 m	MPC · JPL
478744	2012 UC_{84}	—	October 20, 2012	Kitt Peak	Spacewatch	·	1.7 km	MPC · JPL
478745	2012 UH_{85}	—	October 22, 1995	Kitt Peak	Spacewatch	·	1.1 km	MPC · JPL
478746	2012 UX_{85}	—	October 10, 2012	Kitt Peak	Spacewatch	·	1.3 km	MPC · JPL
478747	2012 UN_{88}	—	October 20, 2008	Kitt Peak	Spacewatch	MAR	640 m	MPC · JPL
478748	2012 UT_{88}	—	October 14, 2012	Kitt Peak	Spacewatch	·	1.1 km	MPC · JPL
478749	2012 UH_{89}	—	November 3, 2007	Kitt Peak	Spacewatch	EOS	1.6 km	MPC · JPL
478750	2012 UD_{94}	—	June 17, 2005	Mount Lemmon	Mount Lemmon Survey	·	860 m	MPC · JPL
478751	2012 UZ_{95}	—	March 26, 2010	Kitt Peak	Spacewatch	AGN	1.0 km	MPC · JPL
478752	2012 UX_{96}	—	October 26, 2008	Mount Lemmon	Mount Lemmon Survey	(5)	1.2 km	MPC · JPL
478753	2012 UY_{97}	—	October 18, 2012	Mount Lemmon	Mount Lemmon Survey	·	1.4 km	MPC · JPL
478754	2012 UG_{98}	—	October 21, 2008	Kitt Peak	Spacewatch	·	1.8 km	MPC · JPL
478755	2012 UK_{101}	—	October 7, 2007	Mount Lemmon	Mount Lemmon Survey	·	1.4 km	MPC · JPL
478756	2012 UG_{102}	—	September 24, 1995	Kitt Peak	Spacewatch	·	960 m	MPC · JPL
478757	2012 UW_{103}	—	October 30, 2008	Kitt Peak	Spacewatch	·	1.2 km	MPC · JPL
478758	2012 UX_{103}	—	September 25, 2008	Kitt Peak	Spacewatch	·	910 m	MPC · JPL
478759	2012 UJ_{106}	—	September 30, 2003	Kitt Peak	Spacewatch	·	1.3 km	MPC · JPL
478760	2012 UD_{107}	—	October 16, 2007	Mount Lemmon	Mount Lemmon Survey	526	2.3 km	MPC · JPL
478761	2012 UJ_{108}	—	September 19, 2012	Mount Lemmon	Mount Lemmon Survey	·	1.7 km	MPC · JPL
478762	2012 UM_{109}	—	April 13, 2011	Kitt Peak	Spacewatch	·	1.6 km	MPC · JPL
478763	2012 UZ_{110}	—	September 18, 2012	Mount Lemmon	Mount Lemmon Survey	·	1.4 km	MPC · JPL
478764	2012 UZ_{112}	—	October 3, 2008	Mount Lemmon	Mount Lemmon Survey	(5)	960 m	MPC · JPL
478765	2012 UK_{117}	—	September 15, 2012	Kitt Peak	Spacewatch	·	1.4 km	MPC · JPL
478766	2012 UR_{118}	—	May 20, 2006	Kitt Peak	Spacewatch	·	2.1 km	MPC · JPL
478767	2012 UN_{119}	—	May 25, 2011	Mount Lemmon	Mount Lemmon Survey	·	1.5 km	MPC · JPL
478768	2012 UR_{120}	—	April 2, 2006	Kitt Peak	Spacewatch	·	1.4 km	MPC · JPL
478769	2012 UT_{121}	—	October 15, 2012	Kitt Peak	Spacewatch	·	1.8 km	MPC · JPL
478770	2012 UD_{124}	—	January 16, 2005	Kitt Peak	Spacewatch	·	1.5 km	MPC · JPL
478771	2012 UF_{125}	—	April 17, 2010	Siding Spring	SSS	·	4.2 km	MPC · JPL
478772	2012 UO_{127}	—	May 31, 2011	Mount Lemmon	Mount Lemmon Survey	·	1.2 km	MPC · JPL
478773	2012 UA_{130}	—	February 16, 2010	Mount Lemmon	Mount Lemmon Survey	·	1.2 km	MPC · JPL
478774	2012 UG_{131}	—	November 20, 2008	Kitt Peak	Spacewatch	·	900 m	MPC · JPL
478775	2012 UT_{131}	—	October 16, 2012	Kitt Peak	Spacewatch	·	2.8 km	MPC · JPL
478776	2012 UW_{131}	—	October 26, 2008	Kitt Peak	Spacewatch	JUN	1.0 km	MPC · JPL
478777	2012 UY_{131}	—	September 7, 2008	Mount Lemmon	Mount Lemmon Survey	·	1.1 km	MPC · JPL
478778	2012 UR_{132}	—	January 11, 2005	Socorro	LINEAR	·	1.6 km	MPC · JPL
478779	2012 UU_{132}	—	October 17, 2012	Mount Lemmon	Mount Lemmon Survey	·	1.2 km	MPC · JPL
478780	2012 UC_{133}	—	October 25, 2008	Catalina	CSS	·	1.6 km	MPC · JPL
478781	2012 UG_{133}	—	June 15, 2007	Kitt Peak	Spacewatch	·	1.7 km	MPC · JPL
478782	2012 US_{133}	—	May 3, 2010	WISE	WISE	·	4.1 km	MPC · JPL
478783	2012 US_{135}	—	December 3, 2008	Socorro	LINEAR	·	1.6 km	MPC · JPL
478784	2012 UV_{136}	—	October 22, 2012	Mount Lemmon	Mount Lemmon Survey	APO	30 m	MPC · JPL
478785	2012 UD_{137}	—	October 6, 2008	Mount Lemmon	Mount Lemmon Survey	·	1.3 km	MPC · JPL
478786	2012 UV_{139}	—	February 3, 2005	Socorro	LINEAR	·	1.7 km	MPC · JPL
478787	2012 UO_{140}	—	January 30, 2006	Kitt Peak	Spacewatch	·	1.1 km	MPC · JPL
478788	2012 UX_{140}	—	November 4, 2004	Kitt Peak	Spacewatch	·	900 m	MPC · JPL
478789	2012 US_{145}	—	March 26, 2011	Kitt Peak	Spacewatch	(5)	1.2 km	MPC · JPL
478790	2012 UZ_{146}	—	October 22, 1995	Kitt Peak	Spacewatch	(5)	1.2 km	MPC · JPL
478791	2012 UD_{147}	—	September 4, 2007	Catalina	CSS	·	1.7 km	MPC · JPL
478792	2012 UO_{147}	—	September 9, 2007	Kitt Peak	Spacewatch	·	1.6 km	MPC · JPL
478793	2012 UU_{150}	—	October 10, 2012	Kitt Peak	Spacewatch	·	1.8 km	MPC · JPL
478794	2012 UB_{151}	—	September 10, 2007	Kitt Peak	Spacewatch	·	1.5 km	MPC · JPL
478795	2012 UV_{152}	—	September 21, 1995	Kitt Peak	Spacewatch	(5)	930 m	MPC · JPL
478796	2012 UW_{153}	—	December 1, 2003	Socorro	LINEAR	·	1.6 km	MPC · JPL
478797	2012 UC_{155}	—	December 30, 2008	Kitt Peak	Spacewatch	AGN	1.1 km	MPC · JPL
478798	2012 UG_{155}	—	November 11, 1999	Kitt Peak	Spacewatch	·	1.4 km	MPC · JPL
478799	2012 UO_{156}	—	December 5, 2008	Catalina	CSS	JUN	810 m	MPC · JPL
478800	2012 UU_{160}	—	October 26, 2008	Kitt Peak	Spacewatch	·	1.1 km	MPC · JPL

== 478801–478900 ==
back to top

Designation			Discovery			Properties		Ref
Permanent	Provisional	Named after	Date	Site	Discoverer(s)	Category	Diam.	Ref
478801	2012 UM_{161}	—	December 1, 2008	Kitt Peak	Spacewatch	·	1.7 km	MPC · JPL
478802	2012 UT_{166}	—	February 13, 2002	Kitt Peak	Spacewatch	·	920 m	MPC · JPL
478803	2012 UF_{169}	—	November 2, 2008	Mount Lemmon	Mount Lemmon Survey	·	1.6 km	MPC · JPL
478804	2012 UJ_{169}	—	February 1, 1995	Kitt Peak	Spacewatch	·	1.8 km	MPC · JPL
478805	2012 UT_{171}	—	September 3, 2008	Kitt Peak	Spacewatch	·	2.0 km	MPC · JPL
478806	2012 UZ_{171}	—	February 2, 2005	Kitt Peak	Spacewatch	·	1.3 km	MPC · JPL
478807	2012 UQ_{172}	—	November 19, 2003	Kitt Peak	Spacewatch	·	2.1 km	MPC · JPL
478808	2012 UM_{174}	—	April 28, 2011	Kitt Peak	Spacewatch	·	2.6 km	MPC · JPL
478809	2012 VT	—	October 6, 2008	Mount Lemmon	Mount Lemmon Survey	PHO	870 m	MPC · JPL
478810	2012 VN_{2}	—	November 7, 2008	Mount Lemmon	Mount Lemmon Survey	·	1.4 km	MPC · JPL
478811	2012 VO_{2}	—	October 17, 2012	Mount Lemmon	Mount Lemmon Survey	MAR	1.1 km	MPC · JPL
478812	2012 VG_{7}	—	November 10, 1999	Kitt Peak	Spacewatch	·	1.5 km	MPC · JPL
478813	2012 VB_{9}	—	September 19, 2012	Mount Lemmon	Mount Lemmon Survey	KON	1.6 km	MPC · JPL
478814	2012 VN_{10}	—	December 16, 2000	Kitt Peak	Spacewatch	·	1.3 km	MPC · JPL
478815	2012 VO_{10}	—	October 15, 2012	Kitt Peak	Spacewatch	ADE	1.9 km	MPC · JPL
478816	2012 VB_{11}	—	November 7, 2008	Mount Lemmon	Mount Lemmon Survey	·	1.2 km	MPC · JPL
478817	2012 VF_{14}	—	March 24, 2006	Mount Lemmon	Mount Lemmon Survey	ADE	1.8 km	MPC · JPL
478818	2012 VM_{14}	—	October 21, 2012	Kitt Peak	Spacewatch	·	1.3 km	MPC · JPL
478819	2012 VN_{18}	—	October 17, 2012	Mount Lemmon	Mount Lemmon Survey	·	1.3 km	MPC · JPL
478820	2012 VU_{18}	—	August 24, 2007	Kitt Peak	Spacewatch	·	1.5 km	MPC · JPL
478821	2012 VX_{18}	—	December 29, 2008	Mount Lemmon	Mount Lemmon Survey	·	1.5 km	MPC · JPL
478822	2012 VG_{20}	—	November 21, 2001	Socorro	LINEAR	·	1.2 km	MPC · JPL
478823	2012 VO_{23}	—	September 7, 2008	Mount Lemmon	Mount Lemmon Survey	·	1 km	MPC · JPL
478824	2012 VT_{26}	—	October 1, 2008	Mount Lemmon	Mount Lemmon Survey	·	840 m	MPC · JPL
478825	2012 VW_{28}	—	October 7, 2008	Kitt Peak	Spacewatch	·	1.0 km	MPC · JPL
478826	2012 VT_{29}	—	October 31, 2008	Catalina	CSS	·	1.2 km	MPC · JPL
478827	2012 VP_{30}	—	October 23, 2008	Mount Lemmon	Mount Lemmon Survey	·	1.4 km	MPC · JPL
478828	2012 VV_{33}	—	April 29, 2011	Mount Lemmon	Mount Lemmon Survey	·	1.5 km	MPC · JPL
478829	2012 VT_{36}	—	December 9, 2004	Kitt Peak	Spacewatch	·	710 m	MPC · JPL
478830	2012 VE_{38}	—	December 1, 2008	Kitt Peak	Spacewatch	·	1.0 km	MPC · JPL
478831	2012 VF_{38}	—	April 24, 2006	Kitt Peak	Spacewatch	·	1.9 km	MPC · JPL
478832	2012 VT_{38}	—	October 9, 2012	Mount Lemmon	Mount Lemmon Survey	·	1.3 km	MPC · JPL
478833	2012 VE_{39}	—	April 17, 2010	Mount Lemmon	Mount Lemmon Survey	·	1.2 km	MPC · JPL
478834	2012 VM_{39}	—	December 19, 2004	Mount Lemmon	Mount Lemmon Survey	EUN	1.0 km	MPC · JPL
478835	2012 VE_{40}	—	September 11, 2007	Mount Lemmon	Mount Lemmon Survey	·	1.5 km	MPC · JPL
478836	2012 VG_{40}	—	July 29, 2011	Siding Spring	SSS	·	2.0 km	MPC · JPL
478837	2012 VN_{40}	—	March 18, 2010	Kitt Peak	Spacewatch	·	2.0 km	MPC · JPL
478838	2012 VW_{40}	—	October 20, 2012	Kitt Peak	Spacewatch	·	1.6 km	MPC · JPL
478839	2012 VJ_{44}	—	September 30, 2003	Kitt Peak	Spacewatch	·	1.5 km	MPC · JPL
478840	2012 VO_{44}	—	October 6, 1999	Socorro	LINEAR	·	1.2 km	MPC · JPL
478841	2012 VH_{45}	—	November 7, 2012	Mount Lemmon	Mount Lemmon Survey	·	1.6 km	MPC · JPL
478842	2012 VZ_{45}	—	September 30, 2003	Kitt Peak	Spacewatch	·	1.5 km	MPC · JPL
478843	2012 VN_{47}	—	September 12, 2007	Mount Lemmon	Mount Lemmon Survey	AGN	1.1 km	MPC · JPL
478844	2012 VQ_{49}	—	October 5, 2012	Kitt Peak	Spacewatch	·	1.2 km	MPC · JPL
478845	2012 VC_{52}	—	December 11, 2004	Kitt Peak	Spacewatch	(5)	1.2 km	MPC · JPL
478846	2012 VM_{53}	—	May 8, 2006	Kitt Peak	Spacewatch	EUN	950 m	MPC · JPL
478847	2012 VB_{56}	—	October 31, 2008	Kitt Peak	Spacewatch	·	1.2 km	MPC · JPL
478848	2012 VB_{60}	—	November 3, 2008	Kitt Peak	Spacewatch	·	1.2 km	MPC · JPL
478849	2012 VQ_{60}	—	September 13, 2007	Mount Lemmon	Mount Lemmon Survey	AGN	970 m	MPC · JPL
478850	2012 VH_{61}	—	October 16, 2012	Kitt Peak	Spacewatch	·	1.2 km	MPC · JPL
478851	2012 VF_{63}	—	December 1, 2008	Kitt Peak	Spacewatch	·	1.4 km	MPC · JPL
478852	2012 VV_{67}	—	May 25, 2006	Kitt Peak	Spacewatch	·	1.7 km	MPC · JPL
478853	2012 VN_{70}	—	September 29, 2008	Mount Lemmon	Mount Lemmon Survey	·	930 m	MPC · JPL
478854	2012 VS_{71}	—	November 21, 2008	Kitt Peak	Spacewatch	(5)	880 m	MPC · JPL
478855	2012 VC_{72}	—	May 24, 2006	Kitt Peak	Spacewatch	NEM	2.0 km	MPC · JPL
478856	2012 VK_{73}	—	October 9, 2007	Mount Lemmon	Mount Lemmon Survey	KOR	1.1 km	MPC · JPL
478857	2012 VT_{73}	—	November 26, 2003	Kitt Peak	Spacewatch	·	2.2 km	MPC · JPL
478858	2012 VZ_{73}	—	October 14, 2012	Catalina	CSS	EUN	1.1 km	MPC · JPL
478859	2012 VE_{75}	—	October 9, 2012	Mount Lemmon	Mount Lemmon Survey	(5)	1.1 km	MPC · JPL
478860	2012 VK_{75}	—	October 29, 2008	Kitt Peak	Spacewatch	·	1.5 km	MPC · JPL
478861	2012 VB_{76}	—	October 15, 2007	Kitt Peak	Spacewatch	·	1.4 km	MPC · JPL
478862	2012 VW_{78}	—	October 21, 2012	Kitt Peak	Spacewatch	·	1.1 km	MPC · JPL
478863	2012 VK_{80}	—	December 3, 2008	Mount Lemmon	Mount Lemmon Survey	MRX	1.1 km	MPC · JPL
478864	2012 VX_{80}	—	December 12, 2004	Kitt Peak	Spacewatch	KON	2.1 km	MPC · JPL
478865	2012 VG_{82}	—	November 22, 2008	Kitt Peak	Spacewatch	·	990 m	MPC · JPL
478866	2012 VN_{84}	—	December 9, 2004	Kitt Peak	Spacewatch	·	830 m	MPC · JPL
478867	2012 VU_{84}	—	September 27, 2008	Mount Lemmon	Mount Lemmon Survey	·	1.3 km	MPC · JPL
478868	2012 VT_{86}	—	October 23, 2012	Kitt Peak	Spacewatch	·	1.6 km	MPC · JPL
478869	2012 VA_{91}	—	October 26, 2008	Kitt Peak	Spacewatch	fast	930 m	MPC · JPL
478870	2012 VR_{95}	—	October 28, 2008	Mount Lemmon	Mount Lemmon Survey	WIT	1.0 km	MPC · JPL
478871	2012 VW_{95}	—	November 5, 2012	Kitt Peak	Spacewatch	·	1.4 km	MPC · JPL
478872	2012 VY_{97}	—	March 24, 2006	Kitt Peak	Spacewatch	MAR	1.1 km	MPC · JPL
478873	2012 VZ_{97}	—	November 21, 2004	Campo Imperatore	CINEOS	·	1.2 km	MPC · JPL
478874	2012 VR_{98}	—	September 15, 2012	Mount Lemmon	Mount Lemmon Survey	(1547)	1.5 km	MPC · JPL
478875	2012 VX_{100}	—	June 4, 2011	Kitt Peak	Spacewatch	ADE	2.0 km	MPC · JPL
478876	2012 VA_{101}	—	September 28, 1994	Kitt Peak	Spacewatch	·	1.4 km	MPC · JPL
478877	2012 VU_{102}	—	November 5, 2012	Kitt Peak	Spacewatch	·	1.3 km	MPC · JPL
478878	2012 VA_{106}	—	October 20, 2003	Kitt Peak	Spacewatch	·	1.6 km	MPC · JPL
478879	2012 VL_{106}	—	March 18, 2010	Kitt Peak	Spacewatch	·	1.4 km	MPC · JPL
478880	2012 VP_{106}	—	April 30, 2006	Kitt Peak	Spacewatch	·	1.7 km	MPC · JPL
478881	2012 VZ_{110}	—	September 18, 2012	Mount Lemmon	Mount Lemmon Survey	BRA	1.6 km	MPC · JPL
478882	2012 WW_{1}	—	January 1, 2009	Mount Lemmon	Mount Lemmon Survey	·	1.6 km	MPC · JPL
478883	2012 WA_{8}	—	October 23, 2012	Mount Lemmon	Mount Lemmon Survey	·	1.9 km	MPC · JPL
478884	2012 WB_{8}	—	October 23, 2012	Mount Lemmon	Mount Lemmon Survey	DOR	2.0 km	MPC · JPL
478885	2012 WD_{8}	—	November 7, 2012	Mount Lemmon	Mount Lemmon Survey	EUN	1.3 km	MPC · JPL
478886	2012 WM_{8}	—	January 3, 2009	Kitt Peak	Spacewatch	·	1.8 km	MPC · JPL
478887	2012 WD_{9}	—	October 29, 2003	Kitt Peak	Spacewatch	·	2.7 km	MPC · JPL
478888	2012 WH_{9}	—	December 6, 2000	Kitt Peak	Spacewatch	·	940 m	MPC · JPL
478889	2012 WV_{9}	—	March 17, 2005	Kitt Peak	Spacewatch	·	1.4 km	MPC · JPL
478890	2012 WX_{10}	—	November 19, 2008	Mount Lemmon	Mount Lemmon Survey	·	840 m	MPC · JPL
478891	2012 WQ_{12}	—	March 13, 2010	Mount Lemmon	Mount Lemmon Survey	·	1.1 km	MPC · JPL
478892	2012 WM_{13}	—	October 22, 2012	Mount Lemmon	Mount Lemmon Survey	·	2.3 km	MPC · JPL
478893	2012 WA_{15}	—	December 31, 2008	Kitt Peak	Spacewatch	AGN	1.1 km	MPC · JPL
478894	2012 WZ_{16}	—	November 29, 2000	Anderson Mesa	LONEOS	·	1.7 km	MPC · JPL
478895	2012 WF_{17}	—	October 21, 2003	Kitt Peak	Spacewatch	EUN	1.0 km	MPC · JPL
478896	2012 WC_{18}	—	November 2, 2007	Kitt Peak	Spacewatch	·	2.1 km	MPC · JPL
478897	2012 WJ_{20}	—	January 1, 2009	Mount Lemmon	Mount Lemmon Survey	MRX	930 m	MPC · JPL
478898	2012 WR_{21}	—	March 23, 2006	Kitt Peak	Spacewatch	·	1.8 km	MPC · JPL
478899	2012 WW_{21}	—	December 30, 2008	Mount Lemmon	Mount Lemmon Survey	·	1.6 km	MPC · JPL
478900	2012 WC_{22}	—	November 20, 2003	Kitt Peak	Spacewatch	·	1.6 km	MPC · JPL

== 478901–479000 ==
back to top

Designation			Discovery			Properties		Ref
Permanent	Provisional	Named after	Date	Site	Discoverer(s)	Category	Diam.	Ref
478901	2012 WL_{22}	—	October 23, 1995	Kitt Peak	Spacewatch	·	1.0 km	MPC · JPL
478902	2012 WN_{22}	—	September 14, 2007	Kitt Peak	Spacewatch	·	1.7 km	MPC · JPL
478903	2012 WH_{23}	—	December 19, 2004	Mount Lemmon	Mount Lemmon Survey	(5)	1.2 km	MPC · JPL
478904	2012 WK_{23}	—	June 24, 2011	Mount Lemmon	Mount Lemmon Survey	·	1.4 km	MPC · JPL
478905	2012 WP_{27}	—	December 2, 2008	Kitt Peak	Spacewatch	·	1.1 km	MPC · JPL
478906	2012 WA_{28}	—	February 4, 2005	Mount Lemmon	Mount Lemmon Survey	·	1.1 km	MPC · JPL
478907	2012 WT_{29}	—	December 1, 2008	Mount Lemmon	Mount Lemmon Survey	·	1.3 km	MPC · JPL
478908	2012 WM_{32}	—	November 2, 2011	Mount Lemmon	Mount Lemmon Survey	VER	2.7 km	MPC · JPL
478909	2012 WQ_{33}	—	February 2, 2009	Mount Lemmon	Mount Lemmon Survey	·	1.7 km	MPC · JPL
478910	2012 WY_{34}	—	November 23, 2008	Kitt Peak	Spacewatch	·	1.2 km	MPC · JPL
478911	2012 WF_{35}	—	September 4, 2008	Kitt Peak	Spacewatch	·	1.3 km	MPC · JPL
478912	2012 XS	—	September 16, 2003	Kitt Peak	Spacewatch	·	1.2 km	MPC · JPL
478913	2012 XZ	—	December 2, 2012	Mount Lemmon	Mount Lemmon Survey	·	1.4 km	MPC · JPL
478914	2012 XH_{1}	—	September 18, 2007	Kitt Peak	Spacewatch	·	2.0 km	MPC · JPL
478915	2012 XV_{1}	—	November 19, 1995	Kitt Peak	Spacewatch	EUN	1.1 km	MPC · JPL
478916	2012 XB_{2}	—	November 23, 2012	Kitt Peak	Spacewatch	GEF	1.1 km	MPC · JPL
478917	2012 XH_{2}	—	January 2, 2009	Mount Lemmon	Mount Lemmon Survey	·	930 m	MPC · JPL
478918	2012 XV_{2}	—	December 1, 2008	Kitt Peak	Spacewatch	(5)	1.1 km	MPC · JPL
478919	2012 XG_{3}	—	January 16, 2009	Mount Lemmon	Mount Lemmon Survey	·	1.4 km	MPC · JPL
478920	2012 XO_{3}	—	November 21, 2003	Socorro	LINEAR	EUN	1.3 km	MPC · JPL
478921	2012 XW_{3}	—	November 26, 2003	Kitt Peak	Spacewatch	·	2.1 km	MPC · JPL
478922	2012 XL_{4}	—	April 14, 2010	Kitt Peak	Spacewatch	·	1.4 km	MPC · JPL
478923	2012 XP_{7}	—	February 27, 2006	Kitt Peak	Spacewatch	·	1.1 km	MPC · JPL
478924	2012 XS_{8}	—	November 23, 2012	Kitt Peak	Spacewatch	·	1.4 km	MPC · JPL
478925	2012 XG_{10}	—	April 7, 2006	Kitt Peak	Spacewatch	·	1.5 km	MPC · JPL
478926	2012 XJ_{10}	—	September 21, 2003	Kitt Peak	Spacewatch	·	1.3 km	MPC · JPL
478927	2012 XP_{10}	—	September 14, 2007	Mount Lemmon	Mount Lemmon Survey	·	1.3 km	MPC · JPL
478928	2012 XW_{10}	—	October 20, 2012	Kitt Peak	Spacewatch	·	1.1 km	MPC · JPL
478929	2012 XN_{11}	—	October 13, 2007	Kitt Peak	Spacewatch	AGN	1.1 km	MPC · JPL
478930	2012 XY_{11}	—	September 17, 2003	Kitt Peak	Spacewatch	·	1.0 km	MPC · JPL
478931	2012 XF_{12}	—	December 22, 2008	Kitt Peak	Spacewatch	·	1.2 km	MPC · JPL
478932	2012 XO_{14}	—	October 28, 2008	Mount Lemmon	Mount Lemmon Survey	EUN	1.1 km	MPC · JPL
478933	2012 XH_{19}	—	February 2, 2009	Catalina	CSS	·	1.9 km	MPC · JPL
478934	2012 XM_{20}	—	May 21, 2006	Kitt Peak	Spacewatch	·	1.5 km	MPC · JPL
478935	2012 XC_{21}	—	November 30, 2008	Kitt Peak	Spacewatch	·	1.2 km	MPC · JPL
478936	2012 XR_{25}	—	September 18, 2003	Kitt Peak	Spacewatch	·	1.3 km	MPC · JPL
478937	2012 XN_{29}	—	November 7, 2012	Kitt Peak	Spacewatch	·	2.5 km	MPC · JPL
478938	2012 XR_{29}	—	December 21, 2008	Kitt Peak	Spacewatch	·	1.5 km	MPC · JPL
478939	2012 XV_{30}	—	November 7, 2012	Mount Lemmon	Mount Lemmon Survey	·	1.2 km	MPC · JPL
478940	2012 XL_{34}	—	November 18, 2008	Kitt Peak	Spacewatch	·	1.2 km	MPC · JPL
478941	2012 XU_{36}	—	November 12, 2012	Mount Lemmon	Mount Lemmon Survey	·	2.9 km	MPC · JPL
478942	2012 XF_{38}	—	December 13, 1999	Kitt Peak	Spacewatch	(1547)	1.5 km	MPC · JPL
478943	2012 XE_{40}	—	November 30, 2008	Kitt Peak	Spacewatch	(5)	1.2 km	MPC · JPL
478944	2012 XK_{44}	—	October 24, 1995	Kitt Peak	Spacewatch	·	1.0 km	MPC · JPL
478945	2012 XK_{45}	—	December 1, 2008	Mount Lemmon	Mount Lemmon Survey	ADE	1.6 km	MPC · JPL
478946	2012 XR_{45}	—	September 19, 2003	Kitt Peak	Spacewatch	·	1.5 km	MPC · JPL
478947	2012 XS_{45}	—	October 14, 2012	Kitt Peak	Spacewatch	·	1.7 km	MPC · JPL
478948	2012 XV_{45}	—	March 18, 2010	Kitt Peak	Spacewatch	(5)	1.3 km	MPC · JPL
478949	2012 XS_{46}	—	December 4, 2012	Mount Lemmon	Mount Lemmon Survey	·	1.6 km	MPC · JPL
478950	2012 XO_{49}	—	September 11, 2007	Mount Lemmon	Mount Lemmon Survey	AGN	1.1 km	MPC · JPL
478951	2012 XD_{50}	—	October 17, 2012	Mount Lemmon	Mount Lemmon Survey	·	2.0 km	MPC · JPL
478952	2012 XG_{50}	—	December 15, 2004	Kitt Peak	Spacewatch	(5)	1.0 km	MPC · JPL
478953	2012 XO_{54}	—	June 25, 2010	WISE	WISE	·	3.7 km	MPC · JPL
478954	2012 XP_{56}	—	September 13, 2007	Mount Lemmon	Mount Lemmon Survey	·	2.0 km	MPC · JPL
478955	2012 XK_{62}	—	November 12, 2012	Mount Lemmon	Mount Lemmon Survey	·	1.3 km	MPC · JPL
478956	2012 XS_{64}	—	December 16, 2003	Kitt Peak	Spacewatch	·	2.2 km	MPC · JPL
478957	2012 XH_{66}	—	May 11, 2010	Mount Lemmon	Mount Lemmon Survey	·	1.6 km	MPC · JPL
478958	2012 XX_{66}	—	June 12, 2011	Catalina	CSS	·	1.9 km	MPC · JPL
478959	2012 XL_{67}	—	November 8, 2008	Mount Lemmon	Mount Lemmon Survey	·	1.9 km	MPC · JPL
478960	2012 XD_{71}	—	January 19, 2001	Kitt Peak	Spacewatch	(5)	1.0 km	MPC · JPL
478961	2012 XG_{79}	—	October 26, 2008	Mount Lemmon	Mount Lemmon Survey	·	960 m	MPC · JPL
478962	2012 XM_{79}	—	March 5, 2006	Mount Lemmon	Mount Lemmon Survey	MAR	1.1 km	MPC · JPL
478963	2012 XA_{85}	—	February 3, 2000	Kitt Peak	Spacewatch	·	1.2 km	MPC · JPL
478964	2012 XJ_{85}	—	March 4, 2005	Mount Lemmon	Mount Lemmon Survey	·	1.0 km	MPC · JPL
478965	2012 XD_{86}	—	November 10, 1999	Kitt Peak	Spacewatch	EUN	1.3 km	MPC · JPL
478966	2012 XQ_{86}	—	September 27, 2008	Mount Lemmon	Mount Lemmon Survey	·	800 m	MPC · JPL
478967	2012 XO_{94}	—	November 23, 2008	Kitt Peak	Spacewatch	·	1.3 km	MPC · JPL
478968	2012 XL_{95}	—	November 1, 2008	Mount Lemmon	Mount Lemmon Survey	·	1.4 km	MPC · JPL
478969	2012 XP_{96}	—	October 15, 2007	Kitt Peak	Spacewatch	·	1.6 km	MPC · JPL
478970	2012 XK_{97}	—	September 13, 2007	Mount Lemmon	Mount Lemmon Survey	·	1.5 km	MPC · JPL
478971	2012 XN_{97}	—	September 4, 2007	Mount Lemmon	Mount Lemmon Survey	·	1.3 km	MPC · JPL
478972	2012 XB_{99}	—	November 4, 2012	Kitt Peak	Spacewatch	·	1.0 km	MPC · JPL
478973	2012 XH_{99}	—	September 13, 2007	Mount Lemmon	Mount Lemmon Survey	·	1.5 km	MPC · JPL
478974	2012 XL_{103}	—	February 20, 2009	Siding Spring	SSS	·	3.4 km	MPC · JPL
478975	2012 XT_{104}	—	October 3, 2008	Mount Lemmon	Mount Lemmon Survey	·	1.5 km	MPC · JPL
478976	2012 XU_{105}	—	September 14, 2007	Catalina	CSS	·	2.0 km	MPC · JPL
478977	2012 XX_{106}	—	November 12, 2012	Mount Lemmon	Mount Lemmon Survey	TIR	2.8 km	MPC · JPL
478978	2012 XL_{108}	—	November 19, 2003	Socorro	LINEAR	·	2.3 km	MPC · JPL
478979	2012 XK_{109}	—	December 8, 2012	Mount Lemmon	Mount Lemmon Survey	·	1.8 km	MPC · JPL
478980	2012 XU_{111}	—	May 4, 2009	Siding Spring	SSS	·	1.7 km	MPC · JPL
478981	2012 XK_{116}	—	October 20, 2007	Mount Lemmon	Mount Lemmon Survey	·	1.6 km	MPC · JPL
478982	2012 XV_{116}	—	December 27, 2003	Kitt Peak	Spacewatch	·	1.8 km	MPC · JPL
478983	2012 XB_{118}	—	January 31, 2009	Mount Lemmon	Mount Lemmon Survey	·	1.9 km	MPC · JPL
478984	2012 XL_{119}	—	November 8, 2007	Mount Lemmon	Mount Lemmon Survey	·	1.7 km	MPC · JPL
478985	2012 XY_{119}	—	November 9, 2007	Kitt Peak	Spacewatch	MRX	900 m	MPC · JPL
478986	2012 XQ_{120}	—	November 30, 2008	Kitt Peak	Spacewatch	·	1.0 km	MPC · JPL
478987	2012 XR_{120}	—	December 9, 2012	Kitt Peak	Spacewatch	·	2.2 km	MPC · JPL
478988	2012 XM_{121}	—	October 20, 2006	Mount Lemmon	Mount Lemmon Survey	EOS	1.6 km	MPC · JPL
478989	2012 XD_{124}	—	November 20, 2008	Mount Lemmon	Mount Lemmon Survey	EUN	1.0 km	MPC · JPL
478990	2012 XT_{124}	—	November 26, 2012	Mount Lemmon	Mount Lemmon Survey	·	1.8 km	MPC · JPL
478991	2012 XJ_{126}	—	September 22, 1995	Kitt Peak	Spacewatch	·	860 m	MPC · JPL
478992	2012 XU_{128}	—	October 27, 2003	Kitt Peak	Spacewatch	·	1.8 km	MPC · JPL
478993	2012 XV_{128}	—	October 25, 2008	Kitt Peak	Spacewatch	·	1.3 km	MPC · JPL
478994	2012 XQ_{131}	—	March 21, 2009	Catalina	CSS	·	1.8 km	MPC · JPL
478995	2012 XX_{131}	—	December 4, 2012	Mount Lemmon	Mount Lemmon Survey	MAR	1.1 km	MPC · JPL
478996	2012 XF_{132}	—	October 16, 1995	Kitt Peak	Spacewatch	(5)	720 m	MPC · JPL
478997	2012 XU_{134}	—	March 22, 2009	Catalina	CSS	·	1.2 km	MPC · JPL
478998	2012 XD_{135}	—	January 29, 2009	Mount Lemmon	Mount Lemmon Survey	·	1.5 km	MPC · JPL
478999	2012 XQ_{136}	—	September 7, 2008	Mount Lemmon	Mount Lemmon Survey	·	1.1 km	MPC · JPL
479000	2012 XK_{137}	—	December 22, 2008	Mount Lemmon	Mount Lemmon Survey	·	1.3 km	MPC · JPL

back to top
