= List of minor planets: 443001–444000 =

The following is a partial list of minor planets, running from minor-planet number 443001 through 444000, inclusive. The primary data for this and other partial lists is based on JPL's "Small-Body Orbital Elements" and data available from the Minor Planet Center. Critical list information is also provided by the MPC, unless otherwise specified from Lowell Observatory. A detailed description of the table's columns and additional sources are given on the main page including a complete list of every page in this series, and a statistical break-up on the dynamical classification of minor planets.

Also see the summary list of all named bodies in numerical and alphabetical order, and the corresponding naming citations for the number range of this particular list. New namings may only be added to this list after official publication, as the preannouncement of names is condemned by the Working Group for Small Bodies Nomenclature of the International Astronomical Union.

| Near-Earth obj. | MBA (inner) | MBA (outer) | Centaur |
| Mars-crosser | MBA (middle) | Jupiter trojan | Trans-Neptunian obj. |
| Unclassified |

== 443001–443100 ==
| Designation | | | Discovery | | | Properties | | Ref |
| Permanent | Provisional | Named after | Date | Site | Discoverer(s) | Category | Diam. | Ref |
|---|---|---|---|---|---|---|---|---|
| 443001 | 2013 CV_{191} | — | February 22, 2007 | Kitt Peak | Spacewatch | · | 3.0 km | MPC · JPL |
| 443002 | 2013 CO_{193} | — | May 31, 2010 | WISE | WISE | · | 2.1 km | MPC · JPL |
| 443003 | 2013 CA_{194} | — | April 2, 2009 | Kitt Peak | Spacewatch | · | 1.6 km | MPC · JPL |
| 443004 | 2013 CU_{194} | — | February 8, 2008 | Kitt Peak | Spacewatch | EOS | 1.8 km | MPC · JPL |
| 443005 | 2013 CL_{195} | — | September 30, 2003 | Kitt Peak | Spacewatch | (5) | 910 m | MPC · JPL |
| 443006 | 2013 CX_{195} | — | August 1, 2010 | WISE | WISE | · | 5.0 km | MPC · JPL |
| 443007 | 2013 CV_{198} | — | December 14, 2001 | Kitt Peak | Spacewatch | EOS | 2.2 km | MPC · JPL |
| 443008 | 2013 CS_{199} | — | November 30, 2011 | Mount Lemmon | Mount Lemmon Survey | · | 2.2 km | MPC · JPL |
| 443009 | 2013 CU_{201} | — | September 14, 1998 | Socorro | LINEAR | · | 1.8 km | MPC · JPL |
| 443010 | 2013 CE_{212} | — | November 19, 2006 | Kitt Peak | Spacewatch | HYG | 2.1 km | MPC · JPL |
| 443011 | 2013 CQ_{214} | — | May 6, 2005 | Kitt Peak | Spacewatch | · | 1.6 km | MPC · JPL |
| 443012 | 2013 CE_{216} | — | September 3, 2010 | Mount Lemmon | Mount Lemmon Survey | EOS | 2.0 km | MPC · JPL |
| 443013 | 2013 DO_{2} | — | September 1, 2010 | Mount Lemmon | Mount Lemmon Survey | · | 3.1 km | MPC · JPL |
| 443014 | 2013 DT_{2} | — | October 10, 1999 | Kitt Peak | Spacewatch | · | 950 m | MPC · JPL |
| 443015 | 2013 DS_{7} | — | February 3, 2009 | Mount Lemmon | Mount Lemmon Survey | · | 1.6 km | MPC · JPL |
| 443016 | 2013 DD_{11} | — | January 31, 2008 | Kitt Peak | Spacewatch | · | 2.4 km | MPC · JPL |
| 443017 | 2013 DL_{11} | — | March 1, 2008 | Kitt Peak | Spacewatch | · | 3.3 km | MPC · JPL |
| 443018 | 2013 EN_{4} | — | September 29, 2005 | Kitt Peak | Spacewatch | · | 2.7 km | MPC · JPL |
| 443019 | 2013 EG_{10} | — | January 28, 2007 | Kitt Peak | Spacewatch | · | 4.5 km | MPC · JPL |
| 443020 | 2013 EX_{10} | — | June 28, 2010 | WISE | WISE | · | 4.6 km | MPC · JPL |
| 443021 | 2013 EE_{13} | — | March 11, 2008 | Kitt Peak | Spacewatch | EOS | 1.6 km | MPC · JPL |
| 443022 | 2013 EK_{13} | — | November 20, 2006 | Kitt Peak | Spacewatch | KOR | 1.5 km | MPC · JPL |
| 443023 | 2013 EM_{14} | — | February 16, 2013 | Kitt Peak | Spacewatch | · | 2.8 km | MPC · JPL |
| 443024 | 2013 EX_{15} | — | September 25, 2005 | Kitt Peak | Spacewatch | · | 2.3 km | MPC · JPL |
| 443025 | 2013 EX_{22} | — | March 12, 2008 | Mount Lemmon | Mount Lemmon Survey | EOS | 1.8 km | MPC · JPL |
| 443026 | 2013 EY_{23} | — | January 15, 2008 | Kitt Peak | Spacewatch | GEF | 1.1 km | MPC · JPL |
| 443027 | 2013 ED_{24} | — | May 25, 2006 | Kitt Peak | Spacewatch | 3:2 | 5.0 km | MPC · JPL |
| 443028 | 2013 EM_{25} | — | February 16, 2004 | Kitt Peak | Spacewatch | ADE | 1.7 km | MPC · JPL |
| 443029 | 2013 EY_{32} | — | December 30, 2007 | Kitt Peak | Spacewatch | · | 2.1 km | MPC · JPL |
| 443030 | 2013 ET_{34} | — | October 20, 2006 | Kitt Peak | Spacewatch | KOR | 1.7 km | MPC · JPL |
| 443031 | 2013 EP_{36} | — | November 1, 2005 | Mount Lemmon | Mount Lemmon Survey | · | 4.1 km | MPC · JPL |
| 443032 | 2013 EY_{36} | — | October 3, 2010 | Kitt Peak | Spacewatch | · | 3.0 km | MPC · JPL |
| 443033 | 2013 EB_{40} | — | February 14, 2013 | Catalina | CSS | · | 3.1 km | MPC · JPL |
| 443034 | 2013 EJ_{43} | — | September 14, 2010 | Kitt Peak | Spacewatch | · | 3.0 km | MPC · JPL |
| 443035 | 2013 EJ_{59} | — | May 4, 1995 | Kitt Peak | Spacewatch | HOF | 2.6 km | MPC · JPL |
| 443036 | 2013 EN_{65} | — | February 14, 2013 | Kitt Peak | Spacewatch | · | 3.3 km | MPC · JPL |
| 443037 | 2013 EY_{65} | — | October 5, 2003 | Kitt Peak | Spacewatch | KON | 2.0 km | MPC · JPL |
| 443038 | 2013 EZ_{67} | — | February 16, 2007 | Mount Lemmon | Mount Lemmon Survey | · | 3.1 km | MPC · JPL |
| 443039 | 2013 ET_{81} | — | March 15, 2004 | Kitt Peak | Spacewatch | · | 1.8 km | MPC · JPL |
| 443040 | 2013 EA_{90} | — | February 9, 2007 | Catalina | CSS | · | 4.5 km | MPC · JPL |
| 443041 | 2013 EM_{94} | — | February 7, 2013 | Catalina | CSS | · | 2.2 km | MPC · JPL |
| 443042 | 2013 EN_{95} | — | October 21, 2006 | Kitt Peak | Spacewatch | · | 2.0 km | MPC · JPL |
| 443043 | 2013 ES_{101} | — | September 18, 2010 | Mount Lemmon | Mount Lemmon Survey | EOS | 2.3 km | MPC · JPL |
| 443044 | 2013 EX_{102} | — | December 17, 2003 | Kitt Peak | Spacewatch | · | 1.2 km | MPC · JPL |
| 443045 | 2013 EJ_{104} | — | October 11, 2004 | Kitt Peak | Spacewatch | · | 3.6 km | MPC · JPL |
| 443046 | 2013 EX_{104} | — | March 8, 2005 | Anderson Mesa | LONEOS | 3:2 | 6.0 km | MPC · JPL |
| 443047 | 2013 EX_{106} | — | December 25, 2006 | Kitt Peak | Spacewatch | · | 3.6 km | MPC · JPL |
| 443048 | 2013 EK_{109} | — | March 21, 2002 | Kitt Peak | Spacewatch | · | 3.3 km | MPC · JPL |
| 443049 | 2013 EK_{110} | — | October 7, 2005 | Kitt Peak | Spacewatch | · | 1.9 km | MPC · JPL |
| 443050 | 2013 EV_{111} | — | November 9, 2010 | Catalina | CSS | · | 3.7 km | MPC · JPL |
| 443051 | 2013 EA_{114} | — | December 29, 2008 | Mount Lemmon | Mount Lemmon Survey | · | 1.3 km | MPC · JPL |
| 443052 | 2013 EN_{119} | — | January 10, 2007 | Kitt Peak | Spacewatch | EMA | 4.3 km | MPC · JPL |
| 443053 | 2013 EP_{119} | — | August 28, 2006 | Kitt Peak | Spacewatch | · | 2.1 km | MPC · JPL |
| 443054 | 2013 ES_{126} | — | November 25, 2011 | Haleakala | Pan-STARRS 1 | · | 3.3 km | MPC · JPL |
| 443055 | 2013 EP_{138} | — | October 24, 2011 | Mount Lemmon | Mount Lemmon Survey | · | 1.6 km | MPC · JPL |
| 443056 | 2013 FG_{6} | — | July 14, 2010 | WISE | WISE | · | 4.0 km | MPC · JPL |
| 443057 | 2013 FU_{7} | — | January 2, 2006 | Mount Lemmon | Mount Lemmon Survey | · | 4.1 km | MPC · JPL |
| 443058 | 2013 FK_{11} | — | January 27, 2007 | Kitt Peak | Spacewatch | · | 3.0 km | MPC · JPL |
| 443059 | 2013 FP_{13} | — | January 27, 2007 | Mount Lemmon | Mount Lemmon Survey | · | 3.5 km | MPC · JPL |
| 443060 | 2013 FN_{15} | — | October 1, 2005 | Mount Lemmon | Mount Lemmon Survey | · | 2.7 km | MPC · JPL |
| 443061 | 2013 FB_{16} | — | November 1, 2005 | Mount Lemmon | Mount Lemmon Survey | · | 3.2 km | MPC · JPL |
| 443062 | 2013 FM_{16} | — | October 4, 2004 | Kitt Peak | Spacewatch | · | 4.0 km | MPC · JPL |
| 443063 | 2013 FQ_{20} | — | September 16, 2010 | Kitt Peak | Spacewatch | · | 3.2 km | MPC · JPL |
| 443064 | 2013 FJ_{25} | — | February 29, 2004 | Kitt Peak | Spacewatch | · | 1.9 km | MPC · JPL |
| 443065 | 2013 FK_{25} | — | February 14, 2013 | Nogales | M. Schwartz, P. R. Holvorcem | EOS | 2.3 km | MPC · JPL |
| 443066 | 2013 GV_{2} | — | February 3, 2000 | Kitt Peak | Spacewatch | MAR | 1.1 km | MPC · JPL |
| 443067 | 2013 GD_{4} | — | March 18, 2004 | Socorro | LINEAR | · | 1.9 km | MPC · JPL |
| 443068 | 2013 GJ_{4} | — | March 29, 2004 | Kitt Peak | Spacewatch | · | 2.1 km | MPC · JPL |
| 443069 | 2013 GC_{11} | — | July 3, 2005 | Mount Lemmon | Mount Lemmon Survey | · | 2.2 km | MPC · JPL |
| 443070 | 2013 GO_{11} | — | September 7, 2000 | Kitt Peak | Spacewatch | EOS | 1.8 km | MPC · JPL |
| 443071 | 2013 GO_{13} | — | March 30, 2008 | Catalina | CSS | EMA | 3.8 km | MPC · JPL |
| 443072 | 2013 GX_{14} | — | August 30, 2005 | Kitt Peak | Spacewatch | · | 2.0 km | MPC · JPL |
| 443073 | 2013 GC_{20} | — | March 13, 2007 | Mount Lemmon | Mount Lemmon Survey | ELF | 3.8 km | MPC · JPL |
| 443074 | 2013 GQ_{25} | — | November 6, 2005 | Kitt Peak | Spacewatch | · | 5.2 km | MPC · JPL |
| 443075 | 2013 GV_{25} | — | December 18, 2000 | Kitt Peak | Spacewatch | · | 3.3 km | MPC · JPL |
| 443076 | 2013 GP_{27} | — | April 7, 2008 | Kitt Peak | Spacewatch | EOS | 2.2 km | MPC · JPL |
| 443077 | 2013 GC_{28} | — | January 10, 2007 | Kitt Peak | Spacewatch | EOS | 2.2 km | MPC · JPL |
| 443078 | 2013 GF_{36} | — | September 16, 2009 | Catalina | CSS | · | 4.4 km | MPC · JPL |
| 443079 | 2013 GH_{37} | — | October 6, 1999 | Kitt Peak | Spacewatch | EOS | 2.4 km | MPC · JPL |
| 443080 | 2013 GD_{43} | — | February 23, 2007 | Kitt Peak | Spacewatch | HYG | 2.5 km | MPC · JPL |
| 443081 | 2013 GM_{45} | — | February 17, 2007 | Kitt Peak | Spacewatch | · | 4.1 km | MPC · JPL |
| 443082 | 2013 GO_{62} | — | October 1, 2010 | Kitt Peak | Spacewatch | · | 4.1 km | MPC · JPL |
| 443083 | 2013 GG_{64} | — | April 28, 2008 | Catalina | CSS | · | 4.9 km | MPC · JPL |
| 443084 | 2013 GD_{68} | — | January 28, 2007 | Mount Lemmon | Mount Lemmon Survey | LIX | 4.3 km | MPC · JPL |
| 443085 | 2013 GN_{68} | — | February 21, 2007 | Mount Lemmon | Mount Lemmon Survey | · | 3.2 km | MPC · JPL |
| 443086 | 2013 GQ_{69} | — | September 23, 2008 | Kitt Peak | Spacewatch | 3:2 | 5.5 km | MPC · JPL |
| 443087 | 2013 GC_{117} | — | September 10, 2004 | Kitt Peak | Spacewatch | · | 3.1 km | MPC · JPL |
| 443088 | 2013 GH_{117} | — | August 30, 2005 | Kitt Peak | Spacewatch | KOR | 1.4 km | MPC · JPL |
| 443089 | 2013 GD_{128} | — | December 29, 2008 | Mount Lemmon | Mount Lemmon Survey | · | 1.4 km | MPC · JPL |
| 443090 | 2013 GV_{128} | — | January 17, 2007 | Kitt Peak | Spacewatch | · | 3.0 km | MPC · JPL |
| 443091 | 2013 HT_{1} | — | November 21, 2001 | Kitt Peak | Spacewatch | · | 2.2 km | MPC · JPL |
| 443092 | 2013 HV_{4} | — | March 18, 2009 | Catalina | CSS | · | 2.0 km | MPC · JPL |
| 443093 | 2013 HO_{9} | — | January 25, 2007 | Catalina | CSS | · | 3.1 km | MPC · JPL |
| 443094 | 2013 HN_{15} | — | March 10, 1995 | Kitt Peak | Spacewatch | · | 4.3 km | MPC · JPL |
| 443095 | 2013 HB_{18} | — | November 15, 2001 | Socorro | LINEAR | · | 2.8 km | MPC · JPL |
| 443096 | 2013 HE_{21} | — | January 19, 2012 | Kitt Peak | Spacewatch | · | 2.7 km | MPC · JPL |
| 443097 | 2013 HY_{48} | — | December 28, 2005 | Kitt Peak | Spacewatch | · | 2.6 km | MPC · JPL |
| 443098 | 2013 HX_{110} | — | October 19, 2010 | Mount Lemmon | Mount Lemmon Survey | THM | 1.8 km | MPC · JPL |
| 443099 | 2013 HR_{150} | — | November 11, 2010 | Kitt Peak | Spacewatch | CYB | 3.6 km | MPC · JPL |
| 443100 | 2013 JB_{25} | — | November 23, 2011 | Kitt Peak | Spacewatch | · | 2.8 km | MPC · JPL |

== 443101–443200 ==
back to top

| Designation | | | Discovery | | | Properties | | Ref |
| Permanent | Provisional | Named after | Date | Site | Discoverer(s) | Category | Diam. | Ref |
|---|---|---|---|---|---|---|---|---|
| 443101 | 2013 JM_{31} | — | November 1, 2005 | Mount Lemmon | Mount Lemmon Survey | · | 4.1 km | MPC · JPL |
| 443102 | 2013 WS | — | December 7, 1999 | Kitt Peak | Spacewatch | H | 550 m | MPC · JPL |
| 443103 | 2013 WT_{67} | — | November 29, 2013 | Kitt Peak | Spacewatch | APO +1km · PHA · slow | 900 m | MPC · JPL |
| 443104 | 2013 XK_{22} | — | December 14, 2013 | Catalina | CSS | APO · critical | 50 m | MPC · JPL |
| 443105 | 2013 YK_{13} | — | December 1, 2006 | Mount Lemmon | Mount Lemmon Survey | V | 700 m | MPC · JPL |
| 443106 | 2013 YA_{20} | — | December 27, 2006 | Mount Lemmon | Mount Lemmon Survey | · | 1.1 km | MPC · JPL |
| 443107 | 2013 YQ_{44} | — | November 25, 2009 | Kitt Peak | Spacewatch | V | 790 m | MPC · JPL |
| 443108 | 2013 YY_{54} | — | April 21, 2004 | Kitt Peak | Spacewatch | PHO | 860 m | MPC · JPL |
| 443109 | 2013 YG_{69} | — | January 13, 1999 | Kitt Peak | Spacewatch | · | 1.5 km | MPC · JPL |
| 443110 | 2013 YB_{73} | — | October 26, 2008 | Cerro Tololo | Wasserman, L. H. | · | 1.7 km | MPC · JPL |
| 443111 | 2013 YZ_{73} | — | December 25, 2013 | Mount Lemmon | Mount Lemmon Survey | · | 1.6 km | MPC · JPL |
| 443112 | 2013 YV_{84} | — | January 19, 2004 | Kitt Peak | Spacewatch | H | 470 m | MPC · JPL |
| 443113 | 2013 YQ_{88} | — | February 4, 2000 | Kitt Peak | Spacewatch | · | 780 m | MPC · JPL |
| 443114 | 2013 YL_{96} | — | March 27, 2004 | Socorro | LINEAR | · | 660 m | MPC · JPL |
| 443115 | 2014 AU_{6} | — | May 31, 2006 | Kitt Peak | Spacewatch | · | 2.2 km | MPC · JPL |
| 443116 | 2014 AQ_{19} | — | April 2, 2011 | Mount Lemmon | Mount Lemmon Survey | · | 660 m | MPC · JPL |
| 443117 | 2014 AE_{24} | — | January 3, 2014 | Kitt Peak | Spacewatch | · | 550 m | MPC · JPL |
| 443118 | 2014 AA_{27} | — | January 4, 2014 | Mount Lemmon | Mount Lemmon Survey | · | 1.8 km | MPC · JPL |
| 443119 | 2014 AN_{32} | — | December 6, 2005 | Catalina | CSS | H | 650 m | MPC · JPL |
| 443120 | 2014 AU_{32} | — | February 7, 2006 | Mount Lemmon | Mount Lemmon Survey | H | 690 m | MPC · JPL |
| 443121 | 2014 AW_{43} | — | February 2, 2000 | Socorro | LINEAR | H | 730 m | MPC · JPL |
| 443122 | 2014 AG_{45} | — | September 29, 2009 | Mount Lemmon | Mount Lemmon Survey | · | 760 m | MPC · JPL |
| 443123 | 2014 AG_{46} | — | January 31, 2006 | Catalina | CSS | H | 670 m | MPC · JPL |
| 443124 | 2014 AH_{50} | — | October 28, 2005 | Mount Lemmon | Mount Lemmon Survey | · | 1.2 km | MPC · JPL |
| 443125 | 2014 AS_{51} | — | January 18, 2009 | Mount Lemmon | Mount Lemmon Survey | H | 600 m | MPC · JPL |
| 443126 | 2014 AN_{54} | — | December 12, 2010 | Mount Lemmon | Mount Lemmon Survey | · | 760 m | MPC · JPL |
| 443127 | 2014 BK_{8} | — | November 21, 2000 | Socorro | LINEAR | H | 530 m | MPC · JPL |
| 443128 | 2014 BN_{8} | — | January 2, 2009 | Kitt Peak | Spacewatch | H | 590 m | MPC · JPL |
| 443129 | 2014 BS_{8} | — | February 3, 2009 | Mount Lemmon | Mount Lemmon Survey | H | 500 m | MPC · JPL |
| 443130 | 2014 BA_{9} | — | February 3, 2006 | Catalina | CSS | H | 610 m | MPC · JPL |
| 443131 | 2014 BL_{9} | — | July 14, 2004 | Siding Spring | SSS | H | 590 m | MPC · JPL |
| 443132 | 2014 BT_{12} | — | February 15, 2010 | Mount Lemmon | Mount Lemmon Survey | · | 1.4 km | MPC · JPL |
| 443133 | 2014 BW_{16} | — | February 23, 2003 | Campo Imperatore | CINEOS | · | 1.3 km | MPC · JPL |
| 443134 | 2014 BL_{19} | — | November 21, 2006 | Mount Lemmon | Mount Lemmon Survey | · | 910 m | MPC · JPL |
| 443135 | 2014 BJ_{21} | — | December 25, 2013 | Mount Lemmon | Mount Lemmon Survey | · | 1.8 km | MPC · JPL |
| 443136 | 2014 BP_{21} | — | January 9, 2014 | Mount Lemmon | Mount Lemmon Survey | · | 2.0 km | MPC · JPL |
| 443137 | 2014 BB_{22} | — | February 7, 2007 | Mount Lemmon | Mount Lemmon Survey | · | 820 m | MPC · JPL |
| 443138 | 2014 BE_{25} | — | February 1, 2006 | Catalina | CSS | H | 790 m | MPC · JPL |
| 443139 | 2014 BV_{27} | — | February 8, 2011 | Mount Lemmon | Mount Lemmon Survey | · | 630 m | MPC · JPL |
| 443140 | 2014 BG_{29} | — | March 25, 2011 | Kitt Peak | Spacewatch | · | 670 m | MPC · JPL |
| 443141 | 2014 BN_{34} | — | January 31, 2003 | Socorro | LINEAR | H | 480 m | MPC · JPL |
| 443142 | 2014 BA_{35} | — | May 21, 2004 | Kitt Peak | Spacewatch | · | 640 m | MPC · JPL |
| 443143 | 2014 BB_{37} | — | April 24, 2003 | Campo Imperatore | CINEOS | · | 1.2 km | MPC · JPL |
| 443144 | 2014 BM_{38} | — | November 18, 2003 | Kitt Peak | Spacewatch | WIT | 1.2 km | MPC · JPL |
| 443145 | 2014 BB_{40} | — | October 28, 2005 | Mount Lemmon | Mount Lemmon Survey | · | 1.1 km | MPC · JPL |
| 443146 | 2014 BY_{44} | — | January 6, 2010 | Kitt Peak | Spacewatch | NYS | 1.0 km | MPC · JPL |
| 443147 | 2014 BG_{45} | — | April 16, 2004 | Kitt Peak | Spacewatch | · | 810 m | MPC · JPL |
| 443148 | 2014 BS_{47} | — | March 16, 1994 | Kitt Peak | Spacewatch | · | 730 m | MPC · JPL |
| 443149 | 2014 BU_{57} | — | February 19, 2009 | Kitt Peak | Spacewatch | H | 560 m | MPC · JPL |
| 443150 | 2014 BC_{63} | — | January 29, 2009 | Catalina | CSS | · | 3.5 km | MPC · JPL |
| 443151 | 2014 CB | — | December 2, 2008 | Kitt Peak | Spacewatch | · | 2.6 km | MPC · JPL |
| 443152 | 2014 CY_{3} | — | March 11, 2007 | Kitt Peak | Spacewatch | NYS | 900 m | MPC · JPL |
| 443153 | 2014 CR_{5} | — | May 1, 2006 | Catalina | CSS | · | 1.8 km | MPC · JPL |
| 443154 | 2014 CQ_{6} | — | February 23, 2007 | Kitt Peak | Spacewatch | · | 1 km | MPC · JPL |
| 443155 | 2014 CU_{7} | — | August 22, 1998 | Xinglong | SCAP | · | 2.0 km | MPC · JPL |
| 443156 | 2014 CF_{8} | — | September 1, 2005 | Kitt Peak | Spacewatch | · | 700 m | MPC · JPL |
| 443157 | 2014 CF_{9} | — | January 23, 2006 | Kitt Peak | Spacewatch | · | 1.0 km | MPC · JPL |
| 443158 | 2014 CX_{9} | — | February 26, 2000 | Catalina | CSS | · | 1.0 km | MPC · JPL |
| 443159 | 2014 CV_{15} | — | December 29, 2005 | Kitt Peak | Spacewatch | NYS | 1.2 km | MPC · JPL |
| 443160 | 2014 CA_{17} | — | January 27, 2007 | Kitt Peak | Spacewatch | V | 560 m | MPC · JPL |
| 443161 | 2014 CH_{17} | — | March 14, 2007 | Kitt Peak | Spacewatch | NYS | 1.1 km | MPC · JPL |
| 443162 | 2014 CQ_{17} | — | June 14, 2007 | Kitt Peak | Spacewatch | · | 2.4 km | MPC · JPL |
| 443163 | 2014 CD_{19} | — | March 13, 2010 | Catalina | CSS | · | 1.3 km | MPC · JPL |
| 443164 | 2014 CT_{19} | — | December 21, 2005 | Socorro | LINEAR | H | 530 m | MPC · JPL |
| 443165 | 2014 CY_{21} | — | April 26, 2007 | Mount Lemmon | Mount Lemmon Survey | · | 1.4 km | MPC · JPL |
| 443166 | 2014 CA_{23} | — | January 12, 2010 | Catalina | CSS | · | 1.6 km | MPC · JPL |
| 443167 | 2014 DY_{5} | — | February 6, 2007 | Kitt Peak | Spacewatch | · | 720 m | MPC · JPL |
| 443168 | 2014 DA_{7} | — | February 16, 2010 | Mount Lemmon | Mount Lemmon Survey | · | 1.5 km | MPC · JPL |
| 443169 | 2014 DE_{7} | — | March 15, 2007 | Mount Lemmon | Mount Lemmon Survey | · | 1.1 km | MPC · JPL |
| 443170 | 2014 DG_{9} | — | November 29, 2005 | Kitt Peak | Spacewatch | MAS | 750 m | MPC · JPL |
| 443171 | 2014 DA_{15} | — | February 16, 2010 | Mount Lemmon | Mount Lemmon Survey | · | 1.5 km | MPC · JPL |
| 443172 | 2014 DN_{15} | — | October 22, 2009 | Mount Lemmon | Mount Lemmon Survey | · | 660 m | MPC · JPL |
| 443173 | 2014 DT_{15} | — | January 28, 2006 | Mount Lemmon | Mount Lemmon Survey | · | 1.7 km | MPC · JPL |
| 443174 | 2014 DJ_{16} | — | March 26, 2003 | Kitt Peak | Spacewatch | NYS | 1.5 km | MPC · JPL |
| 443175 | 2014 DT_{18} | — | March 5, 2006 | Kitt Peak | Spacewatch | · | 1.4 km | MPC · JPL |
| 443176 | 2014 DU_{18} | — | November 10, 2005 | Mount Lemmon | Mount Lemmon Survey | · | 1.2 km | MPC · JPL |
| 443177 | 2014 DF_{21} | — | September 28, 2006 | Kitt Peak | Spacewatch | · | 1.7 km | MPC · JPL |
| 443178 | 2014 DG_{21} | — | March 26, 2006 | Kitt Peak | Spacewatch | · | 1.3 km | MPC · JPL |
| 443179 | 2014 DX_{24} | — | February 14, 2010 | Kitt Peak | Spacewatch | · | 990 m | MPC · JPL |
| 443180 | 2014 DC_{26} | — | November 25, 2009 | Kitt Peak | Spacewatch | · | 590 m | MPC · JPL |
| 443181 | 2014 DF_{27} | — | December 6, 2005 | Kitt Peak | Spacewatch | · | 1.0 km | MPC · JPL |
| 443182 | 2014 DX_{28} | — | February 14, 2010 | Kitt Peak | Spacewatch | · | 1.1 km | MPC · JPL |
| 443183 | 2014 DH_{29} | — | January 16, 2009 | Mount Lemmon | Mount Lemmon Survey | · | 1.9 km | MPC · JPL |
| 443184 | 2014 DR_{30} | — | January 28, 2007 | Mount Lemmon | Mount Lemmon Survey | · | 740 m | MPC · JPL |
| 443185 | 2014 DB_{34} | — | May 10, 2007 | Mount Lemmon | Mount Lemmon Survey | V | 690 m | MPC · JPL |
| 443186 | 2014 DU_{37} | — | April 2, 1995 | Kitt Peak | Spacewatch | NYS | 1.2 km | MPC · JPL |
| 443187 | 2014 DM_{38} | — | March 4, 1997 | Kitt Peak | Spacewatch | · | 1.4 km | MPC · JPL |
| 443188 | 2014 DY_{38} | — | March 11, 2011 | Mount Lemmon | Mount Lemmon Survey | · | 820 m | MPC · JPL |
| 443189 | 2014 DY_{39} | — | June 25, 2011 | Kitt Peak | Spacewatch | · | 1.4 km | MPC · JPL |
| 443190 | 2014 DC_{43} | — | April 6, 2011 | Mount Lemmon | Mount Lemmon Survey | · | 760 m | MPC · JPL |
| 443191 | 2014 DD_{46} | — | October 7, 2008 | Mount Lemmon | Mount Lemmon Survey | · | 1.3 km | MPC · JPL |
| 443192 | 2014 DJ_{47} | — | December 19, 2009 | Mount Lemmon | Mount Lemmon Survey | · | 1.1 km | MPC · JPL |
| 443193 | 2014 DA_{48} | — | September 30, 1999 | Kitt Peak | Spacewatch | · | 1.2 km | MPC · JPL |
| 443194 | 2014 DJ_{49} | — | April 29, 2003 | Kitt Peak | Spacewatch | NYS | 1.7 km | MPC · JPL |
| 443195 | 2014 DK_{50} | — | November 1, 2005 | Kitt Peak | Spacewatch | · | 870 m | MPC · JPL |
| 443196 | 2014 DS_{52} | — | November 5, 2005 | Kitt Peak | Spacewatch | · | 1.9 km | MPC · JPL |
| 443197 | 2014 DP_{53} | — | October 27, 2008 | Mount Lemmon | Mount Lemmon Survey | · | 1.4 km | MPC · JPL |
| 443198 | 2014 DG_{56} | — | January 18, 2008 | Kitt Peak | Spacewatch | · | 2.6 km | MPC · JPL |
| 443199 | 2014 DR_{58} | — | March 19, 2007 | Mount Lemmon | Mount Lemmon Survey | · | 1.3 km | MPC · JPL |
| 443200 | 2014 DZ_{65} | — | March 14, 2007 | Mount Lemmon | Mount Lemmon Survey | · | 880 m | MPC · JPL |

== 443201–443300 ==
back to top

| Designation | | | Discovery | | | Properties | | Ref |
| Permanent | Provisional | Named after | Date | Site | Discoverer(s) | Category | Diam. | Ref |
|---|---|---|---|---|---|---|---|---|
| 443201 | 2014 DF_{67} | — | April 6, 2010 | Kitt Peak | Spacewatch | · | 1.2 km | MPC · JPL |
| 443202 | 2014 DH_{68} | — | December 22, 2008 | Mount Lemmon | Mount Lemmon Survey | · | 1.1 km | MPC · JPL |
| 443203 | 2014 DT_{68} | — | March 17, 2010 | Kitt Peak | Spacewatch | · | 1.5 km | MPC · JPL |
| 443204 | 2014 DE_{69} | — | November 25, 2000 | Kitt Peak | Spacewatch | V | 820 m | MPC · JPL |
| 443205 | 2014 DP_{70} | — | November 4, 2005 | Mount Lemmon | Mount Lemmon Survey | · | 950 m | MPC · JPL |
| 443206 | 2014 DQ_{72} | — | November 3, 2008 | Mount Lemmon | Mount Lemmon Survey | · | 900 m | MPC · JPL |
| 443207 | 2014 DB_{73} | — | December 27, 2006 | Mount Lemmon | Mount Lemmon Survey | · | 700 m | MPC · JPL |
| 443208 | 2014 DW_{73} | — | May 22, 2011 | Mount Lemmon | Mount Lemmon Survey | · | 580 m | MPC · JPL |
| 443209 | 2014 DH_{81} | — | February 4, 2000 | Kitt Peak | Spacewatch | · | 730 m | MPC · JPL |
| 443210 | 2014 DC_{83} | — | November 20, 2008 | Kitt Peak | Spacewatch | · | 1.3 km | MPC · JPL |
| 443211 | 2014 DD_{85} | — | November 8, 2007 | Kitt Peak | Spacewatch | KOR | 1.6 km | MPC · JPL |
| 443212 | 2014 DX_{85} | — | March 14, 2007 | Kitt Peak | Spacewatch | V | 600 m | MPC · JPL |
| 443213 | 2014 DB_{88} | — | March 2, 1995 | Kitt Peak | Spacewatch | NYS | 1.2 km | MPC · JPL |
| 443214 | 2014 DN_{88} | — | October 9, 1999 | Kitt Peak | Spacewatch | · | 1.2 km | MPC · JPL |
| 443215 | 2014 DQ_{90} | — | January 8, 2009 | Kitt Peak | Spacewatch | · | 1.5 km | MPC · JPL |
| 443216 | 2014 DL_{93} | — | September 18, 1999 | Kitt Peak | Spacewatch | · | 560 m | MPC · JPL |
| 443217 | 2014 DF_{95} | — | November 20, 2009 | Mount Lemmon | Mount Lemmon Survey | · | 720 m | MPC · JPL |
| 443218 | 2014 DT_{96} | — | February 26, 2007 | Mount Lemmon | Mount Lemmon Survey | NYS | 1.1 km | MPC · JPL |
| 443219 | 2014 DQ_{97} | — | August 31, 2005 | Kitt Peak | Spacewatch | · | 940 m | MPC · JPL |
| 443220 | 2014 DZ_{97} | — | October 24, 2003 | Socorro | LINEAR | · | 1.8 km | MPC · JPL |
| 443221 | 2014 DA_{101} | — | January 28, 2014 | Kitt Peak | Spacewatch | · | 970 m | MPC · JPL |
| 443222 | 2014 DG_{103} | — | October 28, 2006 | Kitt Peak | Spacewatch | · | 610 m | MPC · JPL |
| 443223 | 2014 DX_{103} | — | October 8, 2007 | Mount Lemmon | Mount Lemmon Survey | KON | 2.2 km | MPC · JPL |
| 443224 | 2014 DF_{104} | — | May 1, 2006 | Kitt Peak | Spacewatch | · | 1.6 km | MPC · JPL |
| 443225 | 2014 DD_{105} | — | January 28, 2007 | Mount Lemmon | Mount Lemmon Survey | · | 580 m | MPC · JPL |
| 443226 | 2014 DY_{105} | — | January 10, 2010 | Kitt Peak | Spacewatch | MAS | 650 m | MPC · JPL |
| 443227 | 2014 DW_{106} | — | April 26, 2003 | Kitt Peak | Spacewatch | MAS | 770 m | MPC · JPL |
| 443228 | 2014 DZ_{108} | — | May 7, 2010 | Kitt Peak | Spacewatch | · | 1.4 km | MPC · JPL |
| 443229 | 2014 DV_{111} | — | March 27, 2011 | Kitt Peak | Spacewatch | · | 610 m | MPC · JPL |
| 443230 | 2014 DN_{113} | — | October 31, 2005 | Kitt Peak | Spacewatch | · | 1.0 km | MPC · JPL |
| 443231 | 2014 DO_{115} | — | March 13, 2010 | Mount Lemmon | Mount Lemmon Survey | · | 1.6 km | MPC · JPL |
| 443232 | 2014 DZ_{116} | — | April 6, 2010 | Catalina | CSS | · | 2.0 km | MPC · JPL |
| 443233 | 2014 DR_{117} | — | January 23, 2014 | Mount Lemmon | Mount Lemmon Survey | PHO | 1.0 km | MPC · JPL |
| 443234 | 2014 DM_{119} | — | March 25, 2010 | Kitt Peak | Spacewatch | · | 1.4 km | MPC · JPL |
| 443235 | 2014 DP_{119} | — | April 21, 2006 | Kitt Peak | Spacewatch | · | 2.5 km | MPC · JPL |
| 443236 | 2014 DJ_{120} | — | November 26, 2009 | Kitt Peak | Spacewatch | · | 980 m | MPC · JPL |
| 443237 | 2014 DR_{121} | — | March 19, 2010 | Kitt Peak | Spacewatch | · | 1.2 km | MPC · JPL |
| 443238 | 2014 DR_{122} | — | September 23, 2012 | Mount Lemmon | Mount Lemmon Survey | · | 790 m | MPC · JPL |
| 443239 | 2014 DX_{122} | — | April 11, 2007 | Mount Lemmon | Mount Lemmon Survey | MAS | 640 m | MPC · JPL |
| 443240 | 2014 DE_{124} | — | November 30, 2005 | Kitt Peak | Spacewatch | NYS | 1.2 km | MPC · JPL |
| 443241 | 2014 DO_{124} | — | April 19, 2007 | Mount Lemmon | Mount Lemmon Survey | MAS | 730 m | MPC · JPL |
| 443242 | 2014 DZ_{127} | — | February 9, 2005 | Mount Lemmon | Mount Lemmon Survey | · | 1.8 km | MPC · JPL |
| 443243 | 2014 DE_{132} | — | September 24, 2011 | Mount Lemmon | Mount Lemmon Survey | · | 2.4 km | MPC · JPL |
| 443244 | 2014 DE_{133} | — | February 18, 2010 | Mount Lemmon | Mount Lemmon Survey | · | 1.0 km | MPC · JPL |
| 443245 | 2014 DG_{135} | — | January 2, 2009 | Mount Lemmon | Mount Lemmon Survey | AEO | 980 m | MPC · JPL |
| 443246 | 2014 DL_{137} | — | January 23, 2006 | Kitt Peak | Spacewatch | · | 1.8 km | MPC · JPL |
| 443247 | 2014 DH_{141} | — | December 25, 2009 | Kitt Peak | Spacewatch | · | 1.0 km | MPC · JPL |
| 443248 | 2014 DW_{141} | — | February 23, 2007 | Catalina | CSS | · | 980 m | MPC · JPL |
| 443249 | 2014 DC_{142} | — | November 27, 2009 | Kitt Peak | Spacewatch | ERI | 2.3 km | MPC · JPL |
| 443250 | 2014 DG_{142} | — | December 21, 2008 | Mount Lemmon | Mount Lemmon Survey | · | 2.2 km | MPC · JPL |
| 443251 | 2014 EU_{1} | — | March 12, 2003 | Kitt Peak | Spacewatch | · | 1.5 km | MPC · JPL |
| 443252 | 2014 EJ_{3} | — | August 21, 2008 | Kitt Peak | Spacewatch | · | 1.2 km | MPC · JPL |
| 443253 | 2014 ES_{4} | — | April 14, 2007 | Kitt Peak | Spacewatch | NYS | 900 m | MPC · JPL |
| 443254 | 2014 ET_{5} | — | January 4, 2001 | Kitt Peak | Spacewatch | · | 570 m | MPC · JPL |
| 443255 | 2014 EY_{6} | — | March 13, 2010 | Kitt Peak | Spacewatch | · | 1.4 km | MPC · JPL |
| 443256 | 2014 EA_{7} | — | March 20, 2010 | Kitt Peak | Spacewatch | · | 1.1 km | MPC · JPL |
| 443257 | 2014 EB_{7} | — | April 8, 2003 | Kitt Peak | Spacewatch | MAS | 800 m | MPC · JPL |
| 443258 | 2014 ER_{9} | — | October 1, 2009 | Mount Lemmon | Mount Lemmon Survey | · | 630 m | MPC · JPL |
| 443259 | 2014 EB_{11} | — | December 10, 2004 | Campo Imperatore | CINEOS | · | 1.6 km | MPC · JPL |
| 443260 | 2014 EW_{11} | — | December 16, 2009 | Mount Lemmon | Mount Lemmon Survey | · | 1.3 km | MPC · JPL |
| 443261 | 2014 EG_{13} | — | January 27, 2006 | Mount Lemmon | Mount Lemmon Survey | · | 1.2 km | MPC · JPL |
| 443262 | 2014 EF_{14} | — | September 12, 1998 | Kitt Peak | Spacewatch | · | 1.5 km | MPC · JPL |
| 443263 | 2014 EE_{15} | — | February 13, 2010 | Mount Lemmon | Mount Lemmon Survey | · | 970 m | MPC · JPL |
| 443264 | 2014 EF_{16} | — | November 5, 2007 | Kitt Peak | Spacewatch | KOR | 1.4 km | MPC · JPL |
| 443265 | 2014 EW_{17} | — | April 14, 2007 | Kitt Peak | Spacewatch | · | 1.2 km | MPC · JPL |
| 443266 | 2014 EJ_{18} | — | February 8, 2010 | WISE | WISE | · | 2.0 km | MPC · JPL |
| 443267 | 2014 EL_{18} | — | January 19, 2004 | Kitt Peak | Spacewatch | · | 670 m | MPC · JPL |
| 443268 | 2014 ES_{18} | — | March 26, 2007 | Kitt Peak | Spacewatch | · | 890 m | MPC · JPL |
| 443269 | 2014 ET_{18} | — | June 22, 2007 | Kitt Peak | Spacewatch | fast | 1.5 km | MPC · JPL |
| 443270 | 2014 ET_{21} | — | March 9, 2005 | Kitt Peak | Spacewatch | · | 1.8 km | MPC · JPL |
| 443271 | 2014 ED_{26} | — | October 26, 1995 | Kitt Peak | Spacewatch | · | 2.8 km | MPC · JPL |
| 443272 | 2014 EE_{27} | — | February 27, 2006 | Kitt Peak | Spacewatch | · | 1.1 km | MPC · JPL |
| 443273 | 2014 EL_{27} | — | January 10, 2008 | Mount Lemmon | Mount Lemmon Survey | · | 2.0 km | MPC · JPL |
| 443274 | 2014 ES_{28} | — | February 14, 2010 | Mount Lemmon | Mount Lemmon Survey | · | 1.1 km | MPC · JPL |
| 443275 | 2014 EQ_{30} | — | March 7, 2008 | Mount Lemmon | Mount Lemmon Survey | · | 3.1 km | MPC · JPL |
| 443276 | 2014 EF_{32} | — | December 31, 2013 | Mount Lemmon | Mount Lemmon Survey | EUN | 1.2 km | MPC · JPL |
| 443277 | 2014 EY_{33} | — | December 5, 2008 | Kitt Peak | Spacewatch | · | 1.4 km | MPC · JPL |
| 443278 | 2014 EQ_{36} | — | March 24, 2006 | Kitt Peak | Spacewatch | · | 1.1 km | MPC · JPL |
| 443279 | 2014 ET_{36} | — | November 17, 2009 | Mount Lemmon | Mount Lemmon Survey | · | 840 m | MPC · JPL |
| 443280 | 2014 EA_{46} | — | December 5, 2005 | Kitt Peak | Spacewatch | · | 1.3 km | MPC · JPL |
| 443281 | 2014 EB_{46} | — | January 21, 2006 | Mount Lemmon | Mount Lemmon Survey | · | 1.2 km | MPC · JPL |
| 443282 | 2014 ER_{46} | — | October 17, 2012 | Mount Lemmon | Mount Lemmon Survey | · | 900 m | MPC · JPL |
| 443283 | 2014 EZ_{47} | — | September 21, 2011 | Kitt Peak | Spacewatch | JUN | 1.3 km | MPC · JPL |
| 443284 | 2014 EH_{48} | — | March 20, 2010 | Mount Lemmon | Mount Lemmon Survey | · | 3.6 km | MPC · JPL |
| 443285 | 2014 EM_{48} | — | May 24, 2011 | Mount Lemmon | Mount Lemmon Survey | V | 660 m | MPC · JPL |
| 443286 | 2014 EO_{49} | — | March 25, 2006 | Kitt Peak | Spacewatch | · | 1.2 km | MPC · JPL |
| 443287 | 2014 ES_{51} | — | February 27, 2006 | Kitt Peak | Spacewatch | H | 560 m | MPC · JPL |
| 443288 | 2014 FB_{1} | — | December 30, 2008 | Mount Lemmon | Mount Lemmon Survey | · | 1.7 km | MPC · JPL |
| 443289 | 2014 FD_{2} | — | September 14, 2007 | Catalina | CSS | BRG | 1.7 km | MPC · JPL |
| 443290 | 2014 FH_{3} | — | December 11, 2001 | Socorro | LINEAR | EMA | 3.6 km | MPC · JPL |
| 443291 | 2014 FP_{5} | — | October 9, 2007 | Mount Lemmon | Mount Lemmon Survey | · | 1.4 km | MPC · JPL |
| 443292 | 2014 FT_{5} | — | March 9, 2005 | Mount Lemmon | Mount Lemmon Survey | · | 1.5 km | MPC · JPL |
| 443293 | 2014 FS_{6} | — | November 22, 2006 | Mount Lemmon | Mount Lemmon Survey | · | 2.9 km | MPC · JPL |
| 443294 | 2014 FV_{14} | — | November 13, 2012 | Mount Lemmon | Mount Lemmon Survey | V | 580 m | MPC · JPL |
| 443295 | 2014 FY_{14} | — | May 9, 2005 | Kitt Peak | Spacewatch | · | 2.1 km | MPC · JPL |
| 443296 | 2014 FB_{15} | — | May 18, 2002 | Kitt Peak | Spacewatch | · | 1.5 km | MPC · JPL |
| 443297 | 2014 FD_{15} | — | May 23, 2006 | Mount Lemmon | Mount Lemmon Survey | · | 1.7 km | MPC · JPL |
| 443298 | 2014 FF_{20} | — | September 5, 2008 | Kitt Peak | Spacewatch | · | 930 m | MPC · JPL |
| 443299 | 2014 FK_{20} | — | September 20, 2003 | Kitt Peak | Spacewatch | · | 1.6 km | MPC · JPL |
| 443300 | 2014 FN_{20} | — | April 8, 2010 | Catalina | CSS | · | 2.2 km | MPC · JPL |

== 443301–443400 ==
back to top

| Designation | | | Discovery | | | Properties | | Ref |
| Permanent | Provisional | Named after | Date | Site | Discoverer(s) | Category | Diam. | Ref |
|---|---|---|---|---|---|---|---|---|
| 443301 | 2014 FX_{20} | — | April 2, 2005 | Kitt Peak | Spacewatch | · | 1.9 km | MPC · JPL |
| 443302 | 2014 FC_{21} | — | February 25, 2006 | Mount Lemmon | Mount Lemmon Survey | · | 840 m | MPC · JPL |
| 443303 | 2014 FJ_{23} | — | April 20, 2010 | Siding Spring | SSS | · | 3.7 km | MPC · JPL |
| 443304 | 2014 FD_{24} | — | January 26, 2009 | Mount Lemmon | Mount Lemmon Survey | · | 2.0 km | MPC · JPL |
| 443305 | 2014 FZ_{26} | — | September 26, 1995 | Kitt Peak | Spacewatch | · | 580 m | MPC · JPL |
| 443306 | 2014 FX_{27} | — | January 18, 2009 | Kitt Peak | Spacewatch | MRX | 1.0 km | MPC · JPL |
| 443307 | 2014 FQ_{34} | — | September 26, 2006 | Mount Lemmon | Mount Lemmon Survey | THM | 2.6 km | MPC · JPL |
| 443308 | 2014 FE_{35} | — | September 26, 2006 | Mount Lemmon | Mount Lemmon Survey | · | 2.9 km | MPC · JPL |
| 443309 | 2014 FZ_{35} | — | February 28, 2000 | Kitt Peak | Spacewatch | · | 2.2 km | MPC · JPL |
| 443310 | 2014 FY_{36} | — | March 23, 2003 | Kitt Peak | Spacewatch | · | 3.8 km | MPC · JPL |
| 443311 | 2014 FB_{37} | — | April 29, 1997 | Kitt Peak | Spacewatch | · | 1.3 km | MPC · JPL |
| 443312 | 2014 FO_{41} | — | May 1, 2000 | Kitt Peak | Spacewatch | DOR | 2.5 km | MPC · JPL |
| 443313 | 2014 FT_{44} | — | March 2, 2009 | Mount Lemmon | Mount Lemmon Survey | GEF | 1.5 km | MPC · JPL |
| 443314 | 2014 FG_{48} | — | February 10, 2010 | Kitt Peak | Spacewatch | NYS | 1.3 km | MPC · JPL |
| 443315 | 2014 FX_{48} | — | February 16, 2010 | Mount Lemmon | Mount Lemmon Survey | · | 1.6 km | MPC · JPL |
| 443316 | 2014 FC_{51} | — | March 15, 2010 | Kitt Peak | Spacewatch | · | 1.5 km | MPC · JPL |
| 443317 | 2014 FD_{52} | — | April 8, 2003 | Kitt Peak | Spacewatch | NYS | 990 m | MPC · JPL |
| 443318 | 2014 FG_{52} | — | October 9, 2007 | Kitt Peak | Spacewatch | EUN | 1.3 km | MPC · JPL |
| 443319 | 2014 FV_{52} | — | May 23, 2006 | Mount Lemmon | Mount Lemmon Survey | · | 1.2 km | MPC · JPL |
| 443320 | 2014 FT_{57} | — | October 23, 2008 | Mount Lemmon | Mount Lemmon Survey | · | 1.8 km | MPC · JPL |
| 443321 | 2014 FK_{63} | — | September 4, 2008 | Kitt Peak | Spacewatch | · | 1.5 km | MPC · JPL |
| 443322 | 2014 FT_{63} | — | November 30, 2005 | Mount Lemmon | Mount Lemmon Survey | V | 820 m | MPC · JPL |
| 443323 | 2014 FB_{64} | — | July 3, 2003 | Kitt Peak | Spacewatch | · | 4.0 km | MPC · JPL |
| 443324 | 2014 FO_{64} | — | November 14, 1998 | Kitt Peak | Spacewatch | · | 840 m | MPC · JPL |
| 443325 | 2014 FB_{65} | — | January 1, 2009 | Kitt Peak | Spacewatch | · | 1.6 km | MPC · JPL |
| 443326 | 2014 FM_{65} | — | October 12, 2007 | Mount Lemmon | Mount Lemmon Survey | · | 1.9 km | MPC · JPL |
| 443327 | 2014 FV_{65} | — | December 3, 2008 | Mount Lemmon | Mount Lemmon Survey | · | 1.4 km | MPC · JPL |
| 443328 | 2014 FH_{66} | — | December 7, 2005 | Kitt Peak | Spacewatch | · | 1.4 km | MPC · JPL |
| 443329 | 2014 FQ_{66} | — | January 28, 2007 | Mount Lemmon | Mount Lemmon Survey | · | 970 m | MPC · JPL |
| 443330 | 2014 FD_{67} | — | July 7, 2010 | WISE | WISE | · | 2.8 km | MPC · JPL |
| 443331 | 2014 FO_{68} | — | April 18, 2010 | Kitt Peak | Spacewatch | · | 1.4 km | MPC · JPL |
| 443332 | 2014 GB | — | January 13, 2008 | Kitt Peak | Spacewatch | · | 2.7 km | MPC · JPL |
| 443333 | 2014 GE_{1} | — | September 9, 2007 | Mount Lemmon | Mount Lemmon Survey | H | 440 m | MPC · JPL |
| 443334 | 2014 GY_{3} | — | September 14, 2007 | Mount Lemmon | Mount Lemmon Survey | · | 1.3 km | MPC · JPL |
| 443335 | 2014 GV_{4} | — | November 19, 2008 | Kitt Peak | Spacewatch | · | 980 m | MPC · JPL |
| 443336 | 2014 GB_{6} | — | March 23, 2003 | Kitt Peak | Spacewatch | · | 4.3 km | MPC · JPL |
| 443337 | 2014 GV_{7} | — | November 24, 2011 | Mount Lemmon | Mount Lemmon Survey | · | 3.3 km | MPC · JPL |
| 443338 | 2014 GZ_{7} | — | April 25, 2003 | Kitt Peak | Spacewatch | VER | 4.0 km | MPC · JPL |
| 443339 | 2014 GN_{8} | — | March 14, 2007 | Mount Lemmon | Mount Lemmon Survey | V | 560 m | MPC · JPL |
| 443340 | 2014 GA_{9} | — | April 10, 2010 | Mount Lemmon | Mount Lemmon Survey | · | 1.6 km | MPC · JPL |
| 443341 | 2014 GD_{10} | — | March 2, 2009 | Mount Lemmon | Mount Lemmon Survey | · | 3.4 km | MPC · JPL |
| 443342 | 2014 GM_{13} | — | October 18, 2007 | Mount Lemmon | Mount Lemmon Survey | · | 1.4 km | MPC · JPL |
| 443343 | 2014 GA_{14} | — | February 8, 2008 | Kitt Peak | Spacewatch | · | 1.9 km | MPC · JPL |
| 443344 | 2014 GB_{14} | — | September 1, 2010 | Mount Lemmon | Mount Lemmon Survey | · | 2.0 km | MPC · JPL |
| 443345 | 2014 GZ_{17} | — | December 30, 2007 | Kitt Peak | Spacewatch | · | 2.3 km | MPC · JPL |
| 443346 | 2014 GR_{20} | — | December 22, 2003 | Kitt Peak | Spacewatch | AGN | 1.3 km | MPC · JPL |
| 443347 | 2014 GB_{22} | — | February 13, 2008 | Kitt Peak | Spacewatch | · | 3.5 km | MPC · JPL |
| 443348 | 2014 GM_{28} | — | April 2, 2006 | Kitt Peak | Spacewatch | 3:2 · SHU | 5.1 km | MPC · JPL |
| 443349 | 2014 GA_{31} | — | February 28, 2008 | Mount Lemmon | Mount Lemmon Survey | · | 2.5 km | MPC · JPL |
| 443350 | 2014 GJ_{31} | — | October 30, 2007 | Mount Lemmon | Mount Lemmon Survey | · | 1.6 km | MPC · JPL |
| 443351 | 2014 GW_{32} | — | February 11, 2008 | Mount Lemmon | Mount Lemmon Survey | · | 2.6 km | MPC · JPL |
| 443352 | 2014 GY_{33} | — | October 16, 2007 | Kitt Peak | Spacewatch | · | 1.5 km | MPC · JPL |
| 443353 | 2014 GN_{35} | — | February 29, 2008 | Catalina | CSS | T_{j} (2.99) | 5.9 km | MPC · JPL |
| 443354 | 2014 GO_{35} | — | July 27, 2004 | Siding Spring | SSS | · | 2.8 km | MPC · JPL |
| 443355 | 2014 GP_{35} | — | May 15, 2009 | Kitt Peak | Spacewatch | EOS | 1.7 km | MPC · JPL |
| 443356 | 2014 GF_{36} | — | November 13, 2007 | Kitt Peak | Spacewatch | · | 2.1 km | MPC · JPL |
| 443357 | 2014 GO_{36} | — | November 18, 2008 | Kitt Peak | Spacewatch | · | 1.3 km | MPC · JPL |
| 443358 | 2014 GX_{36} | — | February 27, 2008 | Mount Lemmon | Mount Lemmon Survey | · | 3.0 km | MPC · JPL |
| 443359 | 2014 GY_{37} | — | March 18, 2010 | Kitt Peak | Spacewatch | · | 1.2 km | MPC · JPL |
| 443360 | 2014 GO_{38} | — | March 13, 2008 | Kitt Peak | Spacewatch | · | 2.7 km | MPC · JPL |
| 443361 | 2014 GL_{40} | — | October 8, 2007 | Mount Lemmon | Mount Lemmon Survey | · | 2.2 km | MPC · JPL |
| 443362 | 2014 GM_{40} | — | March 10, 2005 | Anderson Mesa | LONEOS | · | 2.4 km | MPC · JPL |
| 443363 | 2014 GN_{40} | — | December 15, 2004 | Kitt Peak | Spacewatch | · | 1.3 km | MPC · JPL |
| 443364 | 2014 GZ_{42} | — | April 24, 1998 | Kitt Peak | Spacewatch | · | 2.0 km | MPC · JPL |
| 443365 | 2014 GC_{44} | — | September 27, 2011 | Mount Lemmon | Mount Lemmon Survey | · | 1.7 km | MPC · JPL |
| 443366 | 2014 GK_{46} | — | May 18, 1994 | Kitt Peak | Spacewatch | · | 2.4 km | MPC · JPL |
| 443367 | 2014 GO_{50} | — | March 16, 2009 | Kitt Peak | Spacewatch | · | 2.0 km | MPC · JPL |
| 443368 | 2014 GK_{53} | — | May 19, 2006 | Mount Lemmon | Mount Lemmon Survey | · | 1.6 km | MPC · JPL |
| 443369 | 2014 HG | — | July 9, 2010 | WISE | WISE | · | 5.1 km | MPC · JPL |
| 443370 | 2014 HO | — | January 1, 2009 | Mount Lemmon | Mount Lemmon Survey | · | 1.6 km | MPC · JPL |
| 443371 | 2014 HM_{1} | — | April 20, 2010 | Mount Lemmon | Mount Lemmon Survey | · | 1.1 km | MPC · JPL |
| 443372 | 2014 HV_{1} | — | October 21, 2006 | Mount Lemmon | Mount Lemmon Survey | · | 3.0 km | MPC · JPL |
| 443373 | 2014 HD_{2} | — | March 1, 2009 | Kitt Peak | Spacewatch | · | 2.0 km | MPC · JPL |
| 443374 | 2014 HG_{2} | — | October 24, 2005 | Kitt Peak | Spacewatch | · | 3.5 km | MPC · JPL |
| 443375 | 2014 HN_{3} | — | May 17, 2009 | Mount Lemmon | Mount Lemmon Survey | · | 2.7 km | MPC · JPL |
| 443376 | 2014 HK_{5} | — | October 19, 2006 | Kitt Peak | Deep Ecliptic Survey | · | 1.6 km | MPC · JPL |
| 443377 | 2014 HW_{5} | — | April 13, 2004 | Kitt Peak | Spacewatch | · | 2.2 km | MPC · JPL |
| 443378 | 2014 HQ_{6} | — | June 24, 2010 | WISE | WISE | · | 3.8 km | MPC · JPL |
| 443379 | 2014 HP_{7} | — | January 31, 2006 | Kitt Peak | Spacewatch | · | 1.1 km | MPC · JPL |
| 443380 | 2014 HU_{7} | — | October 20, 2011 | Mount Lemmon | Mount Lemmon Survey | · | 1.7 km | MPC · JPL |
| 443381 | 2014 HC_{8} | — | November 3, 2007 | Kitt Peak | Spacewatch | · | 1.5 km | MPC · JPL |
| 443382 | 2014 HX_{8} | — | September 28, 2011 | Kitt Peak | Spacewatch | HOF | 2.2 km | MPC · JPL |
| 443383 | 2014 HP_{9} | — | December 19, 2007 | Kitt Peak | Spacewatch | KOR | 1.3 km | MPC · JPL |
| 443384 | 2014 HZ_{11} | — | October 18, 2011 | Kitt Peak | Spacewatch | EOS | 1.9 km | MPC · JPL |
| 443385 | 2014 HD_{12} | — | October 30, 2005 | Kitt Peak | Spacewatch | · | 3.2 km | MPC · JPL |
| 443386 | 2014 HO_{12} | — | November 11, 2007 | Mount Lemmon | Mount Lemmon Survey | · | 1.3 km | MPC · JPL |
| 443387 | 2014 HD_{15} | — | April 11, 2005 | Mount Lemmon | Mount Lemmon Survey | AGN | 1.4 km | MPC · JPL |
| 443388 | 2014 HS_{16} | — | April 11, 1994 | Kitt Peak | Spacewatch | · | 1.1 km | MPC · JPL |
| 443389 | 2014 HU_{17} | — | May 14, 2005 | Mount Lemmon | Mount Lemmon Survey | AGN | 980 m | MPC · JPL |
| 443390 | 2014 HD_{20} | — | May 4, 2010 | WISE | WISE | · | 810 m | MPC · JPL |
| 443391 | 2014 HW_{21} | — | October 7, 2005 | Kitt Peak | Spacewatch | · | 640 m | MPC · JPL |
| 443392 | 2014 HD_{22} | — | October 10, 2005 | Kitt Peak | Spacewatch | · | 2.9 km | MPC · JPL |
| 443393 | 2014 HN_{22} | — | April 11, 2008 | Mount Lemmon | Mount Lemmon Survey | · | 4.5 km | MPC · JPL |
| 443394 | 2014 HU_{24} | — | May 5, 2006 | Kitt Peak | Spacewatch | MAR | 880 m | MPC · JPL |
| 443395 | 2014 HC_{29} | — | October 1, 2005 | Kitt Peak | Spacewatch | · | 2.4 km | MPC · JPL |
| 443396 | 2014 HZ_{29} | — | February 9, 2008 | Kitt Peak | Spacewatch | · | 2.2 km | MPC · JPL |
| 443397 | 2014 HW_{30} | — | January 20, 2009 | Kitt Peak | Spacewatch | · | 1.4 km | MPC · JPL |
| 443398 | 2014 HJ_{31} | — | September 12, 1994 | Kitt Peak | Spacewatch | · | 2.4 km | MPC · JPL |
| 443399 | 2014 HS_{32} | — | May 22, 2003 | Kitt Peak | Spacewatch | · | 2.5 km | MPC · JPL |
| 443400 | 2014 HV_{34} | — | February 5, 2000 | Kitt Peak | Spacewatch | · | 740 m | MPC · JPL |

== 443401–443500 ==
back to top

| Designation | | | Discovery | | | Properties | | Ref |
| Permanent | Provisional | Named after | Date | Site | Discoverer(s) | Category | Diam. | Ref |
|---|---|---|---|---|---|---|---|---|
| 443401 | 2014 HY_{36} | — | January 18, 2008 | Mount Lemmon | Mount Lemmon Survey | · | 1.5 km | MPC · JPL |
| 443402 | 2014 HU_{37} | — | July 22, 2004 | Siding Spring | SSS | · | 1.7 km | MPC · JPL |
| 443403 | 2014 HC_{38} | — | May 26, 2010 | WISE | WISE | · | 2.7 km | MPC · JPL |
| 443404 | 2014 HU_{38} | — | January 6, 2013 | Kitt Peak | Spacewatch | WIT | 870 m | MPC · JPL |
| 443405 | 2014 HA_{45} | — | August 28, 2005 | Kitt Peak | Spacewatch | · | 1.6 km | MPC · JPL |
| 443406 | 2014 HK_{45} | — | January 5, 2013 | Kitt Peak | Spacewatch | · | 1.5 km | MPC · JPL |
| 443407 | 2014 HP_{45} | — | June 1, 2010 | WISE | WISE | · | 2.8 km | MPC · JPL |
| 443408 | 2014 HU_{47} | — | December 18, 2009 | Mount Lemmon | Mount Lemmon Survey | · | 680 m | MPC · JPL |
| 443409 | 2014 HW_{47} | — | November 8, 2007 | Kitt Peak | Spacewatch | AGN | 1.1 km | MPC · JPL |
| 443410 | 2014 HC_{48} | — | May 12, 2010 | Kitt Peak | Spacewatch | · | 1.8 km | MPC · JPL |
| 443411 | 2014 HK_{49} | — | April 6, 2005 | Mount Lemmon | Mount Lemmon Survey | · | 1.6 km | MPC · JPL |
| 443412 | 2014 HE_{50} | — | November 11, 2001 | Kitt Peak | Spacewatch | · | 1.1 km | MPC · JPL |
| 443413 | 2014 HA_{52} | — | June 22, 2006 | Kitt Peak | Spacewatch | · | 1.5 km | MPC · JPL |
| 443414 | 2014 HD_{62} | — | January 28, 2006 | Kitt Peak | Spacewatch | · | 1.0 km | MPC · JPL |
| 443415 | 2014 HY_{64} | — | October 30, 2005 | Kitt Peak | Spacewatch | · | 880 m | MPC · JPL |
| 443416 | 2014 HJ_{70} | — | February 28, 2008 | Mount Lemmon | Mount Lemmon Survey | THM | 1.8 km | MPC · JPL |
| 443417 | 2014 HL_{73} | — | October 10, 2007 | Kitt Peak | Spacewatch | AGN | 1.1 km | MPC · JPL |
| 443418 | 2014 HM_{73} | — | May 21, 2006 | Mount Lemmon | Mount Lemmon Survey | · | 1.1 km | MPC · JPL |
| 443419 | 2014 HY_{73} | — | June 30, 2005 | Kitt Peak | Spacewatch | KOR | 1.3 km | MPC · JPL |
| 443420 | 2014 HC_{78} | — | May 29, 2010 | WISE | WISE | EOS | 2.7 km | MPC · JPL |
| 443421 | 2014 HJ_{81} | — | February 28, 2009 | Kitt Peak | Spacewatch | · | 2.0 km | MPC · JPL |
| 443422 | 2014 HV_{83} | — | August 18, 2006 | Kitt Peak | Spacewatch | · | 1.6 km | MPC · JPL |
| 443423 | 2014 HJ_{93} | — | April 24, 2006 | Kitt Peak | Spacewatch | · | 990 m | MPC · JPL |
| 443424 | 2014 HP_{95} | — | December 25, 2005 | Kitt Peak | Spacewatch | · | 3.3 km | MPC · JPL |
| 443425 | 2014 HT_{107} | — | March 19, 2009 | Kitt Peak | Spacewatch | · | 1.9 km | MPC · JPL |
| 443426 | 2014 HJ_{111} | — | January 16, 2009 | Mount Lemmon | Mount Lemmon Survey | · | 1.0 km | MPC · JPL |
| 443427 | 2014 HH_{118} | — | January 25, 2006 | Kitt Peak | Spacewatch | · | 1.0 km | MPC · JPL |
| 443428 | 2014 HW_{118} | — | November 18, 2011 | Mount Lemmon | Mount Lemmon Survey | · | 1.6 km | MPC · JPL |
| 443429 | 2014 HJ_{123} | — | September 25, 2007 | Mount Lemmon | Mount Lemmon Survey | · | 1.5 km | MPC · JPL |
| 443430 | 2014 HH_{125} | — | November 20, 2007 | Mount Lemmon | Mount Lemmon Survey | · | 1.9 km | MPC · JPL |
| 443431 | 2014 HS_{130} | — | September 6, 2007 | Siding Spring | SSS | · | 1.7 km | MPC · JPL |
| 443432 | 2014 HZ_{130} | — | September 28, 2006 | Kitt Peak | Spacewatch | AGN | 1.1 km | MPC · JPL |
| 443433 | 2014 HQ_{133} | — | February 23, 1998 | Kitt Peak | Spacewatch | · | 1.6 km | MPC · JPL |
| 443434 | 2014 HO_{136} | — | January 19, 2013 | Mount Lemmon | Mount Lemmon Survey | · | 1.3 km | MPC · JPL |
| 443435 | 2014 HG_{138} | — | September 21, 1996 | Xinglong | SCAP | · | 1.4 km | MPC · JPL |
| 443436 | 2014 HH_{140} | — | January 19, 2013 | Mount Lemmon | Mount Lemmon Survey | KOR | 1.2 km | MPC · JPL |
| 443437 | 2014 HX_{140} | — | September 6, 2008 | Mount Lemmon | Mount Lemmon Survey | 3:2 · SHU | 4.4 km | MPC · JPL |
| 443438 | 2014 HF_{141} | — | November 18, 2007 | Mount Lemmon | Mount Lemmon Survey | · | 1.9 km | MPC · JPL |
| 443439 | 2014 HY_{146} | — | March 19, 2009 | Mount Lemmon | Mount Lemmon Survey | · | 1.6 km | MPC · JPL |
| 443440 | 2014 HG_{149} | — | October 8, 1993 | Kitt Peak | Spacewatch | · | 2.0 km | MPC · JPL |
| 443441 | 2014 HP_{151} | — | September 7, 2011 | Kitt Peak | Spacewatch | AGN | 1.1 km | MPC · JPL |
| 443442 | 2014 HT_{152} | — | October 1, 2005 | Mount Lemmon | Mount Lemmon Survey | · | 2.8 km | MPC · JPL |
| 443443 | 2014 HX_{156} | — | October 20, 2007 | Mount Lemmon | Mount Lemmon Survey | NEM | 2.2 km | MPC · JPL |
| 443444 | 2014 HA_{160} | — | June 29, 2010 | WISE | WISE | HYG | 2.9 km | MPC · JPL |
| 443445 | 2014 HF_{160} | — | February 28, 2008 | Mount Lemmon | Mount Lemmon Survey | HYG | 2.5 km | MPC · JPL |
| 443446 | 2014 HG_{160} | — | February 5, 2000 | Kitt Peak | Spacewatch | NEM | 2.1 km | MPC · JPL |
| 443447 | 2014 HA_{161} | — | March 26, 2009 | Mount Lemmon | Mount Lemmon Survey | · | 2.1 km | MPC · JPL |
| 443448 | 2014 HJ_{161} | — | January 19, 2013 | Kitt Peak | Spacewatch | · | 2.0 km | MPC · JPL |
| 443449 | 2014 HG_{162} | — | July 12, 2010 | WISE | WISE | · | 2.1 km | MPC · JPL |
| 443450 | 2014 HT_{163} | — | September 13, 2004 | Kitt Peak | Spacewatch | · | 1.3 km | MPC · JPL |
| 443451 | 2014 HU_{163} | — | September 22, 2011 | Kitt Peak | Spacewatch | · | 2.0 km | MPC · JPL |
| 443452 | 2014 HJ_{167} | — | December 13, 2006 | Kitt Peak | Spacewatch | · | 3.2 km | MPC · JPL |
| 443453 | 2014 HB_{171} | — | August 30, 2006 | Anderson Mesa | LONEOS | · | 2.1 km | MPC · JPL |
| 443454 | 2014 HS_{171} | — | October 15, 2007 | Catalina | CSS | · | 2.1 km | MPC · JPL |
| 443455 | 2014 HH_{176} | — | September 17, 2006 | Catalina | CSS | · | 2.6 km | MPC · JPL |
| 443456 | 2014 HK_{179} | — | January 9, 2007 | Kitt Peak | Spacewatch | · | 3.4 km | MPC · JPL |
| 443457 | 2014 HW_{183} | — | November 21, 2008 | Mount Lemmon | Mount Lemmon Survey | · | 1.2 km | MPC · JPL |
| 443458 | 2014 HY_{184} | — | December 4, 2007 | Kitt Peak | Spacewatch | NEM | 2.4 km | MPC · JPL |
| 443459 | 2014 HZ_{184} | — | October 16, 2007 | Kitt Peak | Spacewatch | · | 1.5 km | MPC · JPL |
| 443460 | 2014 HE_{188} | — | June 12, 2004 | Socorro | LINEAR | · | 3.5 km | MPC · JPL |
| 443461 | 2014 HV_{188} | — | March 2, 2009 | Kitt Peak | Spacewatch | · | 2.5 km | MPC · JPL |
| 443462 | 2014 HH_{189} | — | May 26, 2003 | Kitt Peak | Spacewatch | · | 3.1 km | MPC · JPL |
| 443463 | 2014 HD_{190} | — | November 4, 1991 | Kitt Peak | Spacewatch | EUN | 1.7 km | MPC · JPL |
| 443464 | 2014 HL_{190} | — | July 28, 2011 | Siding Spring | SSS | V | 860 m | MPC · JPL |
| 443465 | 2014 HA_{191} | — | August 19, 2006 | Kitt Peak | Spacewatch | · | 1.6 km | MPC · JPL |
| 443466 | 2014 HK_{192} | — | March 8, 2008 | Mount Lemmon | Mount Lemmon Survey | · | 3.6 km | MPC · JPL |
| 443467 | 2014 JM_{1} | — | October 2, 2006 | Mount Lemmon | Mount Lemmon Survey | KOR | 1.2 km | MPC · JPL |
| 443468 | 2014 JO_{1} | — | December 20, 2007 | Kitt Peak | Spacewatch | KOR | 1.0 km | MPC · JPL |
| 443469 | 2014 JZ_{1} | — | February 16, 2010 | Kitt Peak | Spacewatch | · | 1.1 km | MPC · JPL |
| 443470 | 2014 JB_{2} | — | January 13, 2008 | Kitt Peak | Spacewatch | KOR | 1.1 km | MPC · JPL |
| 443471 | 2014 JE_{3} | — | October 28, 2011 | Mount Lemmon | Mount Lemmon Survey | · | 2.3 km | MPC · JPL |
| 443472 | 2014 JM_{3} | — | May 1, 2009 | Mount Lemmon | Mount Lemmon Survey | · | 1.8 km | MPC · JPL |
| 443473 | 2014 JR_{4} | — | November 24, 2008 | Mount Lemmon | Mount Lemmon Survey | · | 1.6 km | MPC · JPL |
| 443474 | 2014 JZ_{6} | — | June 7, 2010 | WISE | WISE | · | 4.1 km | MPC · JPL |
| 443475 | 2014 JB_{7} | — | August 30, 2005 | Kitt Peak | Spacewatch | · | 1.8 km | MPC · JPL |
| 443476 | 2014 JK_{7} | — | October 23, 2011 | Mount Lemmon | Mount Lemmon Survey | · | 1.6 km | MPC · JPL |
| 443477 | 2014 JK_{8} | — | October 10, 2007 | Mount Lemmon | Mount Lemmon Survey | · | 1.1 km | MPC · JPL |
| 443478 | 2014 JQ_{9} | — | September 22, 2011 | Kitt Peak | Spacewatch | · | 1.8 km | MPC · JPL |
| 443479 | 2014 JG_{11} | — | October 28, 2005 | Kitt Peak | Spacewatch | · | 2.8 km | MPC · JPL |
| 443480 | 2014 JK_{13} | — | October 10, 2007 | Mount Lemmon | Mount Lemmon Survey | EUN | 1.4 km | MPC · JPL |
| 443481 | 2014 JC_{14} | — | October 29, 2003 | Kitt Peak | Spacewatch | · | 1.7 km | MPC · JPL |
| 443482 | 2014 JC_{19} | — | January 16, 2013 | Mount Lemmon | Mount Lemmon Survey | V | 740 m | MPC · JPL |
| 443483 | 2014 JC_{21} | — | October 25, 2008 | Mount Lemmon | Mount Lemmon Survey | V | 830 m | MPC · JPL |
| 443484 | 2014 JE_{21} | — | May 10, 2005 | Mount Lemmon | Mount Lemmon Survey | · | 2.4 km | MPC · JPL |
| 443485 | 2014 JH_{21} | — | November 17, 2011 | Mount Lemmon | Mount Lemmon Survey | URS | 3.8 km | MPC · JPL |
| 443486 | 2014 JR_{21} | — | November 5, 2005 | Mount Lemmon | Mount Lemmon Survey | · | 5.2 km | MPC · JPL |
| 443487 | 2014 JT_{21} | — | March 10, 2005 | Kitt Peak | Spacewatch | · | 1.4 km | MPC · JPL |
| 443488 | 2014 JY_{21} | — | March 3, 2009 | Catalina | CSS | · | 2.0 km | MPC · JPL |
| 443489 | 2014 JC_{22} | — | May 26, 2003 | Kitt Peak | Spacewatch | · | 2.6 km | MPC · JPL |
| 443490 | 2014 JW_{22} | — | June 10, 2005 | Kitt Peak | Spacewatch | · | 3.6 km | MPC · JPL |
| 443491 | 2014 JW_{23} | — | December 25, 2006 | Kitt Peak | Spacewatch | · | 2.8 km | MPC · JPL |
| 443492 | 2014 JE_{24} | — | November 28, 1995 | Kitt Peak | Spacewatch | · | 1.6 km | MPC · JPL |
| 443493 | 2014 JB_{26} | — | June 25, 2010 | WISE | WISE | · | 4.7 km | MPC · JPL |
| 443494 | 2014 JN_{26} | — | April 17, 2009 | Mount Lemmon | Mount Lemmon Survey | · | 2.0 km | MPC · JPL |
| 443495 | 2014 JS_{26} | — | January 17, 2013 | Kitt Peak | Spacewatch | · | 2.5 km | MPC · JPL |
| 443496 | 2014 JG_{27} | — | March 2, 2013 | Mount Lemmon | Mount Lemmon Survey | · | 2.0 km | MPC · JPL |
| 443497 | 2014 JR_{32} | — | December 24, 2006 | Kitt Peak | Spacewatch | · | 2.6 km | MPC · JPL |
| 443498 | 2014 JG_{33} | — | January 31, 2009 | Kitt Peak | Spacewatch | · | 1.7 km | MPC · JPL |
| 443499 | 2014 JK_{35} | — | March 2, 2009 | Mount Lemmon | Mount Lemmon Survey | · | 1.8 km | MPC · JPL |
| 443500 | 2014 JS_{35} | — | September 30, 2006 | Mount Lemmon | Mount Lemmon Survey | KOR | 1.3 km | MPC · JPL |

== 443501–443600 ==
back to top

| Designation | | | Discovery | | | Properties | | Ref |
| Permanent | Provisional | Named after | Date | Site | Discoverer(s) | Category | Diam. | Ref |
|---|---|---|---|---|---|---|---|---|
| 443501 | 2014 JU_{35} | — | September 17, 2006 | Kitt Peak | Spacewatch | · | 1.8 km | MPC · JPL |
| 443502 | 2014 JV_{37} | — | October 21, 2006 | Mount Lemmon | Mount Lemmon Survey | KOR | 1.2 km | MPC · JPL |
| 443503 | 2014 JF_{39} | — | September 10, 2004 | Kitt Peak | Spacewatch | THM | 3.4 km | MPC · JPL |
| 443504 | 2014 JM_{39} | — | April 19, 2006 | Mount Lemmon | Mount Lemmon Survey | · | 1.7 km | MPC · JPL |
| 443505 | 2014 JU_{39} | — | October 27, 2005 | Catalina | CSS | · | 3.2 km | MPC · JPL |
| 443506 | 2014 JD_{41} | — | September 21, 2011 | Mount Lemmon | Mount Lemmon Survey | · | 1.9 km | MPC · JPL |
| 443507 | 2014 JE_{41} | — | November 16, 2006 | Kitt Peak | Spacewatch | · | 2.1 km | MPC · JPL |
| 443508 | 2014 JN_{43} | — | November 15, 2006 | Mount Lemmon | Mount Lemmon Survey | · | 3.3 km | MPC · JPL |
| 443509 | 2014 JJ_{44} | — | November 24, 2011 | Mount Lemmon | Mount Lemmon Survey | KOR | 1.4 km | MPC · JPL |
| 443510 | 2014 JS_{44} | — | December 12, 2012 | Kitt Peak | Spacewatch | · | 920 m | MPC · JPL |
| 443511 | 2014 JR_{45} | — | January 16, 2004 | Kitt Peak | Spacewatch | · | 1.5 km | MPC · JPL |
| 443512 | 2014 JB_{46} | — | April 5, 2005 | Mount Lemmon | Mount Lemmon Survey | · | 1.5 km | MPC · JPL |
| 443513 | 2014 JD_{52} | — | October 30, 2005 | Kitt Peak | Spacewatch | · | 3.1 km | MPC · JPL |
| 443514 | 2014 JR_{52} | — | April 3, 2008 | Kitt Peak | Spacewatch | · | 2.7 km | MPC · JPL |
| 443515 | 2014 JS_{52} | — | October 6, 2005 | Kitt Peak | Spacewatch | · | 2.4 km | MPC · JPL |
| 443516 | 2014 JQ_{53} | — | March 4, 2008 | Mount Lemmon | Mount Lemmon Survey | · | 2.5 km | MPC · JPL |
| 443517 | 2014 JY_{57} | — | January 10, 2008 | Mount Lemmon | Mount Lemmon Survey | · | 1.6 km | MPC · JPL |
| 443518 | 2014 JY_{58} | — | December 13, 2006 | Kitt Peak | Spacewatch | · | 2.9 km | MPC · JPL |
| 443519 | 2014 JV_{59} | — | March 1, 2009 | Kitt Peak | Spacewatch | · | 2.0 km | MPC · JPL |
| 443520 | 2014 JW_{59} | — | April 14, 2010 | Kitt Peak | Spacewatch | · | 1.3 km | MPC · JPL |
| 443521 | 2014 JB_{60} | — | August 22, 2004 | Kitt Peak | Spacewatch | · | 2.8 km | MPC · JPL |
| 443522 | 2014 JX_{60} | — | November 2, 2007 | Mount Lemmon | Mount Lemmon Survey | DOR | 2.1 km | MPC · JPL |
| 443523 | 2014 JE_{61} | — | September 24, 2006 | Kitt Peak | Spacewatch | AEO | 1.0 km | MPC · JPL |
| 443524 | 2014 JL_{62} | — | January 11, 2008 | Kitt Peak | Spacewatch | · | 2.2 km | MPC · JPL |
| 443525 | 2014 JP_{65} | — | March 6, 2008 | Kitt Peak | Spacewatch | LIX | 3.3 km | MPC · JPL |
| 443526 | 2014 JE_{67} | — | January 10, 2008 | Mount Lemmon | Mount Lemmon Survey | · | 2.1 km | MPC · JPL |
| 443527 | 2014 JK_{67} | — | March 30, 2008 | Kitt Peak | Spacewatch | · | 3.0 km | MPC · JPL |
| 443528 | 2014 JZ_{67} | — | December 31, 2005 | Kitt Peak | Spacewatch | · | 1.2 km | MPC · JPL |
| 443529 | 2014 JS_{70} | — | October 30, 2007 | Mount Lemmon | Mount Lemmon Survey | · | 1.7 km | MPC · JPL |
| 443530 | 2014 JP_{71} | — | November 27, 1995 | Kitt Peak | Spacewatch | · | 1.7 km | MPC · JPL |
| 443531 | 2014 JU_{72} | — | January 2, 2009 | Kitt Peak | Spacewatch | · | 2.0 km | MPC · JPL |
| 443532 | 2014 JW_{73} | — | October 1, 2005 | Mount Lemmon | Mount Lemmon Survey | THM | 2.2 km | MPC · JPL |
| 443533 | 2014 JX_{75} | — | October 2, 2006 | Mount Lemmon | Mount Lemmon Survey | · | 2.2 km | MPC · JPL |
| 443534 | 2014 KY | — | February 29, 2008 | Mount Lemmon | Mount Lemmon Survey | · | 2.6 km | MPC · JPL |
| 443535 | 2014 KJ_{1} | — | April 4, 2008 | Mount Lemmon | Mount Lemmon Survey | · | 3.4 km | MPC · JPL |
| 443536 | 2014 KY_{1} | — | January 6, 2013 | Kitt Peak | Spacewatch | · | 2.5 km | MPC · JPL |
| 443537 | 2014 KR_{2} | — | September 4, 2010 | Kitt Peak | Spacewatch | · | 3.0 km | MPC · JPL |
| 443538 | 2014 KG_{3} | — | February 28, 2008 | Kitt Peak | Spacewatch | EOS | 2.1 km | MPC · JPL |
| 443539 | 2014 KQ_{3} | — | April 25, 2006 | Mount Lemmon | Mount Lemmon Survey | · | 1.5 km | MPC · JPL |
| 443540 | 2014 KT_{3} | — | March 12, 2010 | WISE | WISE | · | 1.7 km | MPC · JPL |
| 443541 | 2014 KT_{4} | — | January 16, 2013 | Mount Lemmon | Mount Lemmon Survey | · | 2.6 km | MPC · JPL |
| 443542 | 2014 KU_{7} | — | March 1, 2009 | Kitt Peak | Spacewatch | HOF | 2.6 km | MPC · JPL |
| 443543 | 2014 KM_{9} | — | April 17, 2005 | Kitt Peak | Spacewatch | · | 1.5 km | MPC · JPL |
| 443544 | 2014 KO_{9} | — | February 9, 2008 | Kitt Peak | Spacewatch | · | 2.1 km | MPC · JPL |
| 443545 | 2014 KK_{10} | — | March 5, 2008 | Kitt Peak | Spacewatch | · | 2.7 km | MPC · JPL |
| 443546 | 2014 KX_{11} | — | April 26, 2009 | Kitt Peak | Spacewatch | KOR | 1.2 km | MPC · JPL |
| 443547 | 2014 KE_{13} | — | March 31, 2008 | Mount Lemmon | Mount Lemmon Survey | · | 2.0 km | MPC · JPL |
| 443548 | 2014 KO_{13} | — | March 11, 2008 | Mount Lemmon | Mount Lemmon Survey | · | 2.5 km | MPC · JPL |
| 443549 | 2014 KM_{14} | — | September 8, 2004 | Socorro | LINEAR | · | 3.6 km | MPC · JPL |
| 443550 | 2014 KX_{14} | — | February 24, 2009 | Mount Lemmon | Mount Lemmon Survey | · | 2.1 km | MPC · JPL |
| 443551 | 2014 KZ_{14} | — | February 7, 2013 | Kitt Peak | Spacewatch | EOS | 1.9 km | MPC · JPL |
| 443552 | 2014 KQ_{16} | — | April 22, 2009 | Mount Lemmon | Mount Lemmon Survey | · | 2.3 km | MPC · JPL |
| 443553 | 2014 KO_{17} | — | September 7, 2000 | Kitt Peak | Spacewatch | · | 1.6 km | MPC · JPL |
| 443554 | 2014 KD_{18} | — | October 17, 2006 | Mount Lemmon | Mount Lemmon Survey | · | 2.3 km | MPC · JPL |
| 443555 | 2014 KJ_{18} | — | November 5, 2007 | Kitt Peak | Spacewatch | · | 1.7 km | MPC · JPL |
| 443556 | 2014 KU_{23} | — | November 1, 2005 | Kitt Peak | Spacewatch | · | 2.3 km | MPC · JPL |
| 443557 | 2014 KA_{24} | — | April 8, 2003 | Kitt Peak | Spacewatch | (5651) | 3.7 km | MPC · JPL |
| 443558 | 2014 KQ_{25} | — | August 21, 2006 | Kitt Peak | Spacewatch | · | 2.2 km | MPC · JPL |
| 443559 | 2014 KU_{25} | — | December 26, 1995 | Kitt Peak | Spacewatch | · | 910 m | MPC · JPL |
| 443560 | 2014 KY_{26} | — | November 25, 2005 | Catalina | CSS | V | 780 m | MPC · JPL |
| 443561 | 2014 KC_{28} | — | April 29, 2006 | Kitt Peak | Spacewatch | · | 1.4 km | MPC · JPL |
| 443562 | 2014 KJ_{28} | — | January 17, 2007 | Kitt Peak | Spacewatch | · | 4.1 km | MPC · JPL |
| 443563 | 2014 KG_{30} | — | May 3, 2014 | Mount Lemmon | Mount Lemmon Survey | · | 2.4 km | MPC · JPL |
| 443564 | 2014 KM_{31} | — | October 8, 2004 | Kitt Peak | Spacewatch | · | 2.4 km | MPC · JPL |
| 443565 | 2014 KX_{31} | — | November 1, 2005 | Mount Lemmon | Mount Lemmon Survey | fast | 2.9 km | MPC · JPL |
| 443566 | 2014 KL_{33} | — | November 26, 2003 | Kitt Peak | Spacewatch | · | 1.4 km | MPC · JPL |
| 443567 | 2014 KY_{34} | — | November 26, 2003 | Kitt Peak | Spacewatch | · | 2.0 km | MPC · JPL |
| 443568 | 2014 KP_{35} | — | September 21, 2011 | Mount Lemmon | Mount Lemmon Survey | · | 1.1 km | MPC · JPL |
| 443569 | 2014 KU_{40} | — | April 10, 2005 | Mount Lemmon | Mount Lemmon Survey | · | 2.1 km | MPC · JPL |
| 443570 | 2014 KU_{42} | — | March 5, 2013 | Mount Lemmon | Mount Lemmon Survey | · | 3.0 km | MPC · JPL |
| 443571 | 2014 KZ_{42} | — | April 20, 2009 | Kitt Peak | Spacewatch | · | 4.4 km | MPC · JPL |
| 443572 | 2014 KL_{51} | — | October 13, 2010 | Mount Lemmon | Mount Lemmon Survey | · | 2.7 km | MPC · JPL |
| 443573 | 2014 KW_{53} | — | April 3, 2008 | Mount Lemmon | Mount Lemmon Survey | · | 2.5 km | MPC · JPL |
| 443574 | 2014 KQ_{55} | — | April 8, 2003 | Kitt Peak | Spacewatch | EOS | 1.7 km | MPC · JPL |
| 443575 | 2014 KC_{57} | — | April 11, 2008 | Kitt Peak | Spacewatch | · | 3.2 km | MPC · JPL |
| 443576 | 2014 KL_{58} | — | May 5, 2008 | Mount Lemmon | Mount Lemmon Survey | · | 3.0 km | MPC · JPL |
| 443577 | 2014 KV_{59} | — | November 13, 2012 | Mount Lemmon | Mount Lemmon Survey | MAR | 1.5 km | MPC · JPL |
| 443578 | 2014 KA_{65} | — | December 13, 2012 | Mount Lemmon | Mount Lemmon Survey | · | 770 m | MPC · JPL |
| 443579 | 2014 KC_{66} | — | October 24, 1995 | Kitt Peak | Spacewatch | EOS | 1.6 km | MPC · JPL |
| 443580 | 2014 KE_{67} | — | December 29, 2003 | Kitt Peak | Spacewatch | · | 1.6 km | MPC · JPL |
| 443581 | 2014 KZ_{67} | — | March 8, 2008 | Kitt Peak | Spacewatch | EOS | 2.1 km | MPC · JPL |
| 443582 | 2014 KR_{70} | — | January 17, 2007 | Kitt Peak | Spacewatch | · | 2.7 km | MPC · JPL |
| 443583 | 2014 KE_{71} | — | October 27, 2005 | Catalina | CSS | · | 3.2 km | MPC · JPL |
| 443584 | 2014 KC_{73} | — | September 11, 2004 | Kitt Peak | Spacewatch | VER | 3.1 km | MPC · JPL |
| 443585 | 2014 KL_{73} | — | June 30, 2010 | WISE | WISE | · | 4.3 km | MPC · JPL |
| 443586 | 2014 KP_{75} | — | September 18, 2003 | Kitt Peak | Spacewatch | · | 1.6 km | MPC · JPL |
| 443587 | 2014 KM_{78} | — | October 29, 2010 | Kitt Peak | Spacewatch | · | 3.5 km | MPC · JPL |
| 443588 | 2014 KL_{82} | — | March 31, 2008 | Mount Lemmon | Mount Lemmon Survey | · | 2.9 km | MPC · JPL |
| 443589 | 2014 KZ_{85} | — | April 11, 2003 | Kitt Peak | Spacewatch | · | 3.2 km | MPC · JPL |
| 443590 | 2014 KG_{87} | — | January 14, 2002 | Kitt Peak | Spacewatch | · | 1.8 km | MPC · JPL |
| 443591 | 2014 KK_{88} | — | November 11, 2007 | Catalina | CSS | · | 1.7 km | MPC · JPL |
| 443592 | 2014 KU_{89} | — | July 22, 2006 | Mount Lemmon | Mount Lemmon Survey | · | 1.9 km | MPC · JPL |
| 443593 | 2014 KJ_{91} | — | July 9, 2010 | WISE | WISE | · | 3.1 km | MPC · JPL |
| 443594 | 2014 KL_{91} | — | December 13, 2006 | Kitt Peak | Spacewatch | EOS | 2.3 km | MPC · JPL |
| 443595 | 2014 KQ_{92} | — | November 1, 2005 | Mount Lemmon | Mount Lemmon Survey | EOS | 2.4 km | MPC · JPL |
| 443596 | 2014 KM_{93} | — | September 25, 2000 | Kitt Peak | Spacewatch | · | 1.6 km | MPC · JPL |
| 443597 | 2014 KU_{93} | — | May 2, 2008 | Kitt Peak | Spacewatch | · | 2.8 km | MPC · JPL |
| 443598 | 2014 KY_{94} | — | December 31, 2007 | Mount Lemmon | Mount Lemmon Survey | · | 1.8 km | MPC · JPL |
| 443599 | 2014 KJ_{96} | — | November 26, 2005 | Catalina | CSS | · | 4.3 km | MPC · JPL |
| 443600 | 2014 KC_{97} | — | October 11, 2010 | Mount Lemmon | Mount Lemmon Survey | · | 3.8 km | MPC · JPL |

== 443601–443700 ==
back to top

| Designation | | | Discovery | | | Properties | | Ref |
| Permanent | Provisional | Named after | Date | Site | Discoverer(s) | Category | Diam. | Ref |
|---|---|---|---|---|---|---|---|---|
| 443601 | 2014 KA_{98} | — | April 4, 2008 | Mount Lemmon | Mount Lemmon Survey | HYG | 2.5 km | MPC · JPL |
| 443602 | 2014 KE_{98} | — | November 29, 2005 | Kitt Peak | Spacewatch | · | 3.5 km | MPC · JPL |
| 443603 | 2014 KM_{100} | — | April 13, 2008 | Kitt Peak | Spacewatch | · | 3.3 km | MPC · JPL |
| 443604 | 2014 KP_{101} | — | December 10, 2001 | Socorro | LINEAR | · | 3.5 km | MPC · JPL |
| 443605 | 2014 LZ_{2} | — | November 16, 1995 | Kitt Peak | Spacewatch | · | 1.3 km | MPC · JPL |
| 443606 | 2014 LG_{8} | — | December 26, 2006 | Kitt Peak | Spacewatch | EOS | 1.9 km | MPC · JPL |
| 443607 | 2014 LT_{8} | — | November 15, 2007 | Mount Lemmon | Mount Lemmon Survey | · | 1.7 km | MPC · JPL |
| 443608 | 2014 LA_{10} | — | April 15, 2008 | Mount Lemmon | Mount Lemmon Survey | · | 3.3 km | MPC · JPL |
| 443609 | 2014 LX_{10} | — | February 13, 2002 | Kitt Peak | Spacewatch | · | 3.3 km | MPC · JPL |
| 443610 | 2014 LZ_{10} | — | October 30, 2005 | Kitt Peak | Spacewatch | · | 2.9 km | MPC · JPL |
| 443611 | 2014 LZ_{14} | — | June 15, 2009 | Mount Lemmon | Mount Lemmon Survey | · | 3.4 km | MPC · JPL |
| 443612 | 2014 LA_{22} | — | December 27, 2005 | Kitt Peak | Spacewatch | · | 1.0 km | MPC · JPL |
| 443613 | 2014 LC_{22} | — | January 13, 2002 | Socorro | LINEAR | · | 2.4 km | MPC · JPL |
| 443614 | 2014 LT_{22} | — | September 3, 2010 | Mount Lemmon | Mount Lemmon Survey | EOS | 2.4 km | MPC · JPL |
| 443615 | 2014 LA_{25} | — | December 19, 2001 | Kitt Peak | Spacewatch | · | 2.8 km | MPC · JPL |
| 443616 | 2014 LG_{25} | — | October 28, 2005 | Mount Lemmon | Mount Lemmon Survey | · | 3.5 km | MPC · JPL |
| 443617 | 2014 LJ_{25} | — | November 29, 2005 | Kitt Peak | Spacewatch | VER | 2.7 km | MPC · JPL |
| 443618 | 2014 MO_{1} | — | October 8, 2005 | Kitt Peak | Spacewatch | · | 3.1 km | MPC · JPL |
| 443619 | 2014 MM_{2} | — | February 21, 2010 | WISE | WISE | · | 2.9 km | MPC · JPL |
| 443620 | 2014 MJ_{3} | — | October 4, 2004 | Kitt Peak | Spacewatch | · | 3.2 km | MPC · JPL |
| 443621 | 2014 MK_{11} | — | November 30, 2005 | Mount Lemmon | Mount Lemmon Survey | · | 3.4 km | MPC · JPL |
| 443622 | 2014 MA_{21} | — | May 2, 2009 | Mount Lemmon | Mount Lemmon Survey | · | 2.2 km | MPC · JPL |
| 443623 | 2014 MM_{23} | — | March 5, 2013 | Catalina | CSS | · | 4.2 km | MPC · JPL |
| 443624 | 2014 ML_{34} | — | July 22, 2010 | WISE | WISE | EOS | 3.6 km | MPC · JPL |
| 443625 | 2014 MM_{34} | — | January 10, 2007 | Kitt Peak | Spacewatch | · | 3.6 km | MPC · JPL |
| 443626 | 2014 MM_{36} | — | May 30, 2006 | Mount Lemmon | Mount Lemmon Survey | · | 1.8 km | MPC · JPL |
| 443627 | 2014 MX_{40} | — | January 20, 2012 | Mount Lemmon | Mount Lemmon Survey | · | 3.4 km | MPC · JPL |
| 443628 | 2014 MS_{46} | — | April 14, 2008 | Kitt Peak | Spacewatch | · | 2.4 km | MPC · JPL |
| 443629 | 2014 MQ_{47} | — | April 11, 2008 | Kitt Peak | Spacewatch | · | 2.4 km | MPC · JPL |
| 443630 | 2014 MM_{54} | — | October 31, 2010 | Mount Lemmon | Mount Lemmon Survey | · | 2.1 km | MPC · JPL |
| 443631 | 2014 MD_{58} | — | January 27, 2000 | Kitt Peak | Spacewatch | HYG | 3.1 km | MPC · JPL |
| 443632 | 2014 NA_{1} | — | March 14, 2010 | Kitt Peak | Spacewatch | V | 770 m | MPC · JPL |
| 443633 | 2014 NH_{17} | — | September 25, 2005 | Kitt Peak | Spacewatch | EOS | 2.1 km | MPC · JPL |
| 443634 | 2014 NR_{55} | — | April 29, 2008 | Mount Lemmon | Mount Lemmon Survey | EOS | 2.1 km | MPC · JPL |
| 443635 | 2014 NW_{61} | — | January 18, 2008 | Mount Lemmon | Mount Lemmon Survey | · | 2.1 km | MPC · JPL |
| 443636 | 2014 OE | — | December 26, 2011 | Kitt Peak | Spacewatch | · | 2.3 km | MPC · JPL |
| 443637 | 2014 OB_{6} | — | June 26, 2001 | Kitt Peak | Spacewatch | · | 2.6 km | MPC · JPL |
| 443638 | 2014 OY_{14} | — | February 28, 2009 | Mount Lemmon | Mount Lemmon Survey | · | 1.5 km | MPC · JPL |
| 443639 | 2014 OB_{131} | — | March 1, 2008 | Kitt Peak | Spacewatch | · | 2.8 km | MPC · JPL |
| 443640 | 2014 OR_{131} | — | January 27, 2007 | Kitt Peak | Spacewatch | · | 3.8 km | MPC · JPL |
| 443641 | 2014 OH_{202} | — | December 27, 2005 | Mount Lemmon | Mount Lemmon Survey | · | 3.5 km | MPC · JPL |
| 443642 | 2014 OH_{207} | — | November 10, 2004 | Kitt Peak | Spacewatch | VER | 4.1 km | MPC · JPL |
| 443643 | 2014 OQ_{211} | — | September 11, 2010 | Kitt Peak | Spacewatch | · | 3.2 km | MPC · JPL |
| 443644 | 2014 ON_{212} | — | August 18, 2009 | Kitt Peak | Spacewatch | · | 3.0 km | MPC · JPL |
| 443645 | 2014 OO_{212} | — | February 23, 2007 | Kitt Peak | Spacewatch | · | 3.7 km | MPC · JPL |
| 443646 | 2014 OB_{240} | — | June 27, 1998 | Kitt Peak | Spacewatch | · | 2.7 km | MPC · JPL |
| 443647 | 2014 OX_{281} | — | September 15, 2009 | Kitt Peak | Spacewatch | LIX | 3.6 km | MPC · JPL |
| 443648 | 2014 OO_{316} | — | March 25, 2007 | Mount Lemmon | Mount Lemmon Survey | · | 3.1 km | MPC · JPL |
| 443649 | 2014 ON_{343} | — | September 16, 2010 | Kitt Peak | Spacewatch | TEL | 1.9 km | MPC · JPL |
| 443650 | 2014 QU_{189} | — | September 18, 2003 | Kitt Peak | Spacewatch | · | 3.2 km | MPC · JPL |
| 443651 | 2015 DS_{211} | — | May 8, 1997 | Kitt Peak | Spacewatch | V | 820 m | MPC · JPL |
| 443652 | 2015 EU_{64} | — | May 5, 2008 | Mount Lemmon | Mount Lemmon Survey | · | 1.1 km | MPC · JPL |
| 443653 | 2015 FO_{32} | — | March 13, 2007 | Mount Lemmon | Mount Lemmon Survey | · | 1.4 km | MPC · JPL |
| 443654 | 2015 FT_{43} | — | March 13, 2002 | Socorro | LINEAR | · | 1.6 km | MPC · JPL |
| 443655 | 2015 FP_{76} | — | May 6, 2006 | Mount Lemmon | Mount Lemmon Survey | HOF | 2.8 km | MPC · JPL |
| 443656 | 2015 FB_{77} | — | November 21, 1998 | Kitt Peak | Spacewatch | ULA · CYB | 6.1 km | MPC · JPL |
| 443657 | 2015 FK_{77} | — | September 25, 2006 | Anderson Mesa | LONEOS | · | 3.9 km | MPC · JPL |
| 443658 | 2015 FY_{115} | — | April 14, 2005 | Catalina | CSS | · | 4.4 km | MPC · JPL |
| 443659 | 2015 FM_{213} | — | April 10, 2010 | Kitt Peak | Spacewatch | EOS | 2.3 km | MPC · JPL |
| 443660 | 2015 FH_{294} | — | March 3, 2009 | Catalina | CSS | · | 4.1 km | MPC · JPL |
| 443661 | 2015 FF_{301} | — | January 28, 2006 | Kitt Peak | Spacewatch | · | 1.7 km | MPC · JPL |
| 443662 | 2015 FC_{302} | — | September 28, 2003 | Anderson Mesa | LONEOS | · | 2.4 km | MPC · JPL |
| 443663 | 2015 FY_{314} | — | April 23, 2004 | Socorro | LINEAR | · | 1.8 km | MPC · JPL |
| 443664 | 2015 FX_{315} | — | January 13, 2005 | Kitt Peak | Spacewatch | · | 3.1 km | MPC · JPL |
| 443665 | 2015 FO_{335} | — | April 12, 1996 | Kitt Peak | Spacewatch | · | 1.4 km | MPC · JPL |
| 443666 | 2015 FV_{337} | — | January 10, 2008 | Mount Lemmon | Mount Lemmon Survey | · | 5.0 km | MPC · JPL |
| 443667 | 2015 FE_{338} | — | December 12, 1996 | Kitt Peak | Spacewatch | · | 900 m | MPC · JPL |
| 443668 | 2015 HX | — | June 3, 2005 | Kitt Peak | Spacewatch | · | 830 m | MPC · JPL |
| 443669 | 2015 HA_{43} | — | April 19, 1993 | Kitt Peak | Spacewatch | · | 3.6 km | MPC · JPL |
| 443670 | 2015 HX_{60} | — | February 27, 2006 | Kitt Peak | Spacewatch | MAR | 1.0 km | MPC · JPL |
| 443671 | 2015 HL_{94} | — | October 10, 2007 | Mount Lemmon | Mount Lemmon Survey | · | 2.3 km | MPC · JPL |
| 443672 | 2015 HR_{148} | — | September 9, 2005 | Socorro | LINEAR | · | 1.1 km | MPC · JPL |
| 443673 | 2015 HD_{155} | — | October 20, 2003 | Kitt Peak | Spacewatch | · | 2.4 km | MPC · JPL |
| 443674 | 2015 HN_{170} | — | October 24, 2009 | Kitt Peak | Spacewatch | · | 480 m | MPC · JPL |
| 443675 | 2015 HF_{171} | — | May 7, 2008 | Mount Lemmon | Mount Lemmon Survey | · | 2.3 km | MPC · JPL |
| 443676 | 2015 KO_{4} | — | October 14, 2007 | Mount Lemmon | Mount Lemmon Survey | EOS | 2.1 km | MPC · JPL |
| 443677 | 2015 KP_{8} | — | September 22, 2003 | Kitt Peak | Spacewatch | · | 1.5 km | MPC · JPL |
| 443678 | 2015 KJ_{13} | — | May 17, 2010 | Mount Lemmon | Mount Lemmon Survey | · | 3.2 km | MPC · JPL |
| 443679 | 2015 KP_{13} | — | May 30, 2006 | Kitt Peak | Spacewatch | · | 1.7 km | MPC · JPL |
| 443680 | 2015 KZ_{13} | — | August 10, 2007 | Kitt Peak | Spacewatch | · | 1.6 km | MPC · JPL |
| 443681 | 2015 KS_{14} | — | March 16, 2010 | Mount Lemmon | Mount Lemmon Survey | · | 1.9 km | MPC · JPL |
| 443682 | 2015 KZ_{15} | — | September 30, 2006 | Catalina | CSS | EOS | 2.2 km | MPC · JPL |
| 443683 | 2015 KF_{16} | — | January 7, 2006 | Mount Lemmon | Mount Lemmon Survey | · | 2.2 km | MPC · JPL |
| 443684 | 2015 KF_{18} | — | August 2, 2010 | Socorro | LINEAR | · | 3.4 km | MPC · JPL |
| 443685 | 2015 KQ_{19} | — | October 29, 2005 | Mount Lemmon | Mount Lemmon Survey | · | 1.1 km | MPC · JPL |
| 443686 | 2015 KK_{22} | — | August 25, 1995 | Kitt Peak | Spacewatch | EUN | 1.3 km | MPC · JPL |
| 443687 | 2015 KE_{36} | — | March 14, 2007 | Mount Lemmon | Mount Lemmon Survey | · | 1.1 km | MPC · JPL |
| 443688 | 2015 KN_{38} | — | April 22, 2007 | Kitt Peak | Spacewatch | SUL | 2.1 km | MPC · JPL |
| 443689 | 2015 KM_{39} | — | November 3, 2005 | Kitt Peak | Spacewatch | · | 1.2 km | MPC · JPL |
| 443690 | 2015 KB_{41} | — | September 27, 2008 | Mount Lemmon | Mount Lemmon Survey | · | 2.1 km | MPC · JPL |
| 443691 | 2015 KL_{41} | — | December 14, 2010 | Mount Lemmon | Mount Lemmon Survey | · | 1.1 km | MPC · JPL |
| 443692 | 2015 KD_{47} | — | March 3, 2009 | Catalina | CSS | · | 3.2 km | MPC · JPL |
| 443693 | 2015 KF_{64} | — | February 16, 2004 | Kitt Peak | Spacewatch | · | 1.9 km | MPC · JPL |
| 443694 | 2015 KA_{101} | — | April 24, 2008 | Mount Lemmon | Mount Lemmon Survey | (2076) | 830 m | MPC · JPL |
| 443695 | 2015 KJ_{103} | — | April 9, 2003 | Kitt Peak | Spacewatch | · | 2.9 km | MPC · JPL |
| 443696 | 2015 KD_{107} | — | December 29, 2008 | Kitt Peak | Spacewatch | · | 2.0 km | MPC · JPL |
| 443697 | 2015 KL_{108} | — | December 17, 2009 | Kitt Peak | Spacewatch | · | 1.9 km | MPC · JPL |
| 443698 | 2015 KS_{108} | — | November 20, 2000 | Anderson Mesa | LONEOS | · | 1.7 km | MPC · JPL |
| 443699 | 2015 KU_{109} | — | September 21, 2003 | Kitt Peak | Spacewatch | EUN | 1.2 km | MPC · JPL |
| 443700 | 2015 KB_{110} | — | October 31, 2005 | Catalina | CSS | · | 1.5 km | MPC · JPL |

== 443701–443800 ==
back to top

| Designation | | | Discovery | | | Properties | | Ref |
| Permanent | Provisional | Named after | Date | Site | Discoverer(s) | Category | Diam. | Ref |
|---|---|---|---|---|---|---|---|---|
| 443701 | 2015 KE_{110} | — | February 27, 2006 | Kitt Peak | Spacewatch | (5) | 1.4 km | MPC · JPL |
| 443702 | 2015 KA_{111} | — | April 25, 2006 | Kitt Peak | Spacewatch | JUN | 950 m | MPC · JPL |
| 443703 | 2015 KQ_{111} | — | August 29, 2005 | Kitt Peak | Spacewatch | V | 700 m | MPC · JPL |
| 443704 | 2015 KU_{111} | — | February 2, 2008 | Mount Lemmon | Mount Lemmon Survey | · | 2.4 km | MPC · JPL |
| 443705 | 2015 KM_{112} | — | May 23, 2006 | Kitt Peak | Spacewatch | · | 2.0 km | MPC · JPL |
| 443706 | 2015 KD_{113} | — | February 22, 2009 | Catalina | CSS | · | 3.3 km | MPC · JPL |
| 443707 | 2015 KU_{113} | — | January 8, 2000 | Kitt Peak | Spacewatch | · | 2.4 km | MPC · JPL |
| 443708 | 2015 KY_{122} | — | March 28, 2009 | Catalina | CSS | · | 4.3 km | MPC · JPL |
| 443709 | 2015 KC_{132} | — | October 18, 2009 | Mount Lemmon | Mount Lemmon Survey | · | 540 m | MPC · JPL |
| 443710 | 2015 KM_{133} | — | December 17, 1996 | Kitt Peak | Spacewatch | MAR | 1.5 km | MPC · JPL |
| 443711 | 2015 KA_{135} | — | October 11, 2005 | Kitt Peak | Spacewatch | · | 1.0 km | MPC · JPL |
| 443712 | 2015 KZ_{136} | — | September 28, 1994 | Kitt Peak | Spacewatch | · | 1.2 km | MPC · JPL |
| 443713 | 2015 KO_{142} | — | May 15, 2004 | Socorro | LINEAR | T_{j} (2.96) | 5.4 km | MPC · JPL |
| 443714 | 2015 KR_{144} | — | October 17, 2006 | Mount Lemmon | Mount Lemmon Survey | · | 900 m | MPC · JPL |
| 443715 | 2015 KX_{146} | — | September 26, 2008 | Mount Lemmon | Mount Lemmon Survey | · | 1.4 km | MPC · JPL |
| 443716 | 2015 KC_{148} | — | April 20, 1996 | Kitt Peak | Spacewatch | · | 1.2 km | MPC · JPL |
| 443717 | 2015 KA_{157} | — | February 14, 2004 | Kitt Peak | Spacewatch | H | 600 m | MPC · JPL |
| 443718 | 2015 KB_{160} | — | September 21, 2003 | Kitt Peak | Spacewatch | · | 1.3 km | MPC · JPL |
| 443719 | 2015 LC_{1} | — | February 24, 2009 | Catalina | CSS | · | 3.5 km | MPC · JPL |
| 443720 | 2015 LF_{1} | — | January 15, 2008 | Mount Lemmon | Mount Lemmon Survey | · | 2.8 km | MPC · JPL |
| 443721 | 2015 LL_{2} | — | April 21, 2004 | Kitt Peak | Spacewatch | PHO | 910 m | MPC · JPL |
| 443722 | 2015 LM_{9} | — | April 2, 2011 | Kitt Peak | Spacewatch | MAS | 750 m | MPC · JPL |
| 443723 | 2015 LT_{9} | — | July 13, 1999 | Socorro | LINEAR | · | 2.1 km | MPC · JPL |
| 443724 | 2015 LH_{12} | — | September 17, 2003 | Kitt Peak | Spacewatch | (5) | 1.1 km | MPC · JPL |
| 443725 | 2015 LK_{13} | — | January 10, 2007 | Mount Lemmon | Mount Lemmon Survey | PHO | 1.0 km | MPC · JPL |
| 443726 | 2015 LS_{15} | — | December 18, 2007 | Mount Lemmon | Mount Lemmon Survey | (8737) | 3.8 km | MPC · JPL |
| 443727 | 2015 LT_{15} | — | December 21, 2006 | Mount Lemmon | Mount Lemmon Survey | · | 4.2 km | MPC · JPL |
| 443728 | 2015 LK_{19} | — | October 10, 2007 | Mount Lemmon | Mount Lemmon Survey | AEO | 1.0 km | MPC · JPL |
| 443729 | 2015 LF_{20} | — | May 3, 2006 | Mount Lemmon | Mount Lemmon Survey | MAR | 1.3 km | MPC · JPL |
| 443730 | 2015 LL_{20} | — | April 5, 2010 | Kitt Peak | Spacewatch | · | 1.4 km | MPC · JPL |
| 443731 | 2015 LX_{21} | — | June 15, 2001 | Socorro | LINEAR | · | 2.5 km | MPC · JPL |
| 443732 | 2015 LD_{22} | — | May 17, 2004 | Socorro | LINEAR | · | 3.8 km | MPC · JPL |
| 443733 | 2015 LE_{22} | — | April 22, 2011 | Kitt Peak | Spacewatch | · | 1.9 km | MPC · JPL |
| 443734 | 2015 LH_{22} | — | August 31, 2005 | Kitt Peak | Spacewatch | · | 840 m | MPC · JPL |
| 443735 | 2015 LC_{23} | — | March 10, 2007 | Mount Lemmon | Mount Lemmon Survey | T_{j} (2.94) | 5.1 km | MPC · JPL |
| 443736 | 2015 LK_{23} | — | April 30, 2004 | Kitt Peak | Spacewatch | · | 4.6 km | MPC · JPL |
| 443737 | 2015 LT_{29} | — | August 28, 2011 | Siding Spring | SSS | · | 2.8 km | MPC · JPL |
| 443738 | 2015 LP_{30} | — | January 9, 2007 | Mount Lemmon | Mount Lemmon Survey | · | 2.8 km | MPC · JPL |
| 443739 | 2015 LP_{31} | — | January 12, 2010 | Mount Lemmon | Mount Lemmon Survey | V | 680 m | MPC · JPL |
| 443740 | 2015 LF_{32} | — | February 1, 1995 | Kitt Peak | Spacewatch | · | 2.0 km | MPC · JPL |
| 443741 | 2015 LZ_{32} | — | May 23, 1999 | Kitt Peak | Spacewatch | · | 1.7 km | MPC · JPL |
| 443742 | 2015 LX_{33} | — | June 24, 2010 | WISE | WISE | · | 5.4 km | MPC · JPL |
| 443743 | 2015 LM_{34} | — | February 17, 2004 | Socorro | LINEAR | · | 3.2 km | MPC · JPL |
| 443744 | 2015 LX_{34} | — | November 21, 2006 | Mount Lemmon | Mount Lemmon Survey | · | 3.2 km | MPC · JPL |
| 443745 | 2015 LB_{35} | — | April 4, 2010 | Catalina | CSS | · | 2.7 km | MPC · JPL |
| 443746 | 2015 LE_{35} | — | May 15, 2010 | WISE | WISE | · | 3.2 km | MPC · JPL |
| 443747 | 2015 LF_{38} | — | November 19, 2008 | Catalina | CSS | · | 2.1 km | MPC · JPL |
| 443748 | 2015 LO_{38} | — | May 1, 2009 | Mount Lemmon | Mount Lemmon Survey | · | 3.4 km | MPC · JPL |
| 443749 | 2015 LM_{39} | — | June 27, 2008 | Siding Spring | SSS | · | 950 m | MPC · JPL |
| 443750 | 2015 MG | — | March 2, 2009 | Mount Lemmon | Mount Lemmon Survey | · | 3.9 km | MPC · JPL |
| 443751 | 2015 MU_{6} | — | August 31, 2005 | Kitt Peak | Spacewatch | · | 2.8 km | MPC · JPL |
| 443752 | 2015 ML_{7} | — | March 9, 2005 | Kitt Peak | Spacewatch | WIT | 1.0 km | MPC · JPL |
| 443753 | 2015 MW_{7} | — | September 10, 2010 | Mount Lemmon | Mount Lemmon Survey | VER | 2.7 km | MPC · JPL |
| 443754 | 2015 MK_{8} | — | June 17, 2010 | WISE | WISE | · | 4.7 km | MPC · JPL |
| 443755 | 2015 MV_{8} | — | November 29, 2003 | Kitt Peak | Spacewatch | · | 1.5 km | MPC · JPL |
| 443756 | 2015 MB_{9} | — | July 8, 2010 | Kitt Peak | Spacewatch | · | 4.5 km | MPC · JPL |
| 443757 | 2015 MF_{9} | — | September 30, 2005 | Catalina | CSS | · | 4.9 km | MPC · JPL |
| 443758 | 2015 MB_{11} | — | September 16, 2003 | Kitt Peak | Spacewatch | · | 1.5 km | MPC · JPL |
| 443759 | 2015 MU_{23} | — | August 31, 2005 | Kitt Peak | Spacewatch | · | 2.2 km | MPC · JPL |
| 443760 | 2015 MC_{24} | — | September 15, 2012 | Catalina | CSS | · | 1.1 km | MPC · JPL |
| 443761 | 2015 MV_{25} | — | February 14, 1999 | Kitt Peak | Spacewatch | · | 1.7 km | MPC · JPL |
| 443762 | 2015 MR_{26} | — | March 4, 2005 | Mount Lemmon | Mount Lemmon Survey | AGN | 1.3 km | MPC · JPL |
| 443763 | 2015 ME_{31} | — | October 26, 2005 | Kitt Peak | Spacewatch | · | 1.7 km | MPC · JPL |
| 443764 | 2015 MG_{44} | — | October 14, 2012 | Mount Lemmon | Mount Lemmon Survey | EUN | 1.2 km | MPC · JPL |
| 443765 | 2015 MU_{52} | — | December 13, 2006 | Mount Lemmon | Mount Lemmon Survey | · | 4.4 km | MPC · JPL |
| 443766 | 2015 MC_{55} | — | December 14, 1995 | Kitt Peak | Spacewatch | · | 1.6 km | MPC · JPL |
| 443767 | 2015 MG_{55} | — | May 24, 2006 | Kitt Peak | Spacewatch | MAR | 1.2 km | MPC · JPL |
| 443768 | 2015 MB_{56} | — | December 18, 2001 | Socorro | LINEAR | · | 3.0 km | MPC · JPL |
| 443769 | 2015 MQ_{56} | — | June 22, 2010 | WISE | WISE | · | 3.1 km | MPC · JPL |
| 443770 | 2015 MW_{56} | — | August 30, 2005 | Kitt Peak | Spacewatch | · | 740 m | MPC · JPL |
| 443771 | 2015 ME_{57} | — | January 6, 2013 | Kitt Peak | Spacewatch | · | 3.8 km | MPC · JPL |
| 443772 | 2015 MU_{57} | — | September 14, 2007 | Catalina | CSS | · | 1.3 km | MPC · JPL |
| 443773 | 2015 MB_{59} | — | August 16, 2004 | Siding Spring | SSS | · | 5.7 km | MPC · JPL |
| 443774 | 2015 MK_{65} | — | June 14, 2010 | WISE | WISE | · | 2.6 km | MPC · JPL |
| 443775 | 2015 MW_{65} | — | December 13, 2006 | Mount Lemmon | Mount Lemmon Survey | · | 3.8 km | MPC · JPL |
| 443776 | 2015 MC_{67} | — | March 18, 2004 | Kitt Peak | Spacewatch | · | 3.7 km | MPC · JPL |
| 443777 | 2015 MS_{67} | — | June 23, 2007 | Kitt Peak | Spacewatch | · | 1.2 km | MPC · JPL |
| 443778 | 2015 MX_{67} | — | August 21, 2004 | Siding Spring | SSS | · | 5.1 km | MPC · JPL |
| 443779 | 2015 ML_{68} | — | September 29, 2005 | Kitt Peak | Spacewatch | · | 2.2 km | MPC · JPL |
| 443780 | 2015 MO_{68} | — | November 28, 1994 | Kitt Peak | Spacewatch | V | 570 m | MPC · JPL |
| 443781 | 2015 MW_{71} | — | May 26, 2009 | Mount Lemmon | Mount Lemmon Survey | · | 2.9 km | MPC · JPL |
| 443782 | 2015 MN_{73} | — | March 16, 2009 | Mount Lemmon | Mount Lemmon Survey | · | 1.7 km | MPC · JPL |
| 443783 | 2015 MB_{74} | — | November 20, 2005 | Catalina | CSS | · | 5.5 km | MPC · JPL |
| 443784 | 2015 ML_{74} | — | May 23, 2010 | WISE | WISE | · | 3.5 km | MPC · JPL |
| 443785 | 2015 MH_{78} | — | June 24, 2010 | WISE | WISE | · | 5.1 km | MPC · JPL |
| 443786 | 2015 ME_{89} | — | April 4, 2008 | Mount Lemmon | Mount Lemmon Survey | · | 3.1 km | MPC · JPL |
| 443787 | 2015 MD_{91} | — | December 10, 2001 | Kitt Peak | Spacewatch | · | 5.3 km | MPC · JPL |
| 443788 | 2015 MF_{92} | — | November 3, 2008 | Mount Lemmon | Mount Lemmon Survey | · | 2.2 km | MPC · JPL |
| 443789 | 2015 MZ_{92} | — | May 29, 2000 | Kitt Peak | Spacewatch | · | 930 m | MPC · JPL |
| 443790 | 2015 MB_{93} | — | July 2, 2005 | Kitt Peak | Spacewatch | · | 2.9 km | MPC · JPL |
| 443791 | 2015 MC_{93} | — | February 27, 2009 | Kitt Peak | Spacewatch | · | 1.7 km | MPC · JPL |
| 443792 | 2015 ML_{93} | — | August 9, 2004 | Anderson Mesa | LONEOS | · | 1.0 km | MPC · JPL |
| 443793 | 2015 MO_{93} | — | May 23, 2010 | WISE | WISE | · | 4.3 km | MPC · JPL |
| 443794 | 2015 MS_{93} | — | October 22, 2008 | Mount Lemmon | Mount Lemmon Survey | · | 2.4 km | MPC · JPL |
| 443795 | 1917 T-3 | — | October 17, 1977 | Palomar | C. J. van Houten, I. van Houten-Groeneveld, T. Gehrels | · | 1.7 km | MPC · JPL |
| 443796 | 1960 SW | — | September 24, 1960 | Palomar | L. D. Schmadel, Stoss, R. | · | 1.5 km | MPC · JPL |
| 443797 | 1994 SQ_{11} | — | September 29, 1994 | Kitt Peak | Spacewatch | · | 1.4 km | MPC · JPL |
| 443798 | 1995 CO_{2} | — | February 1, 1995 | Kitt Peak | Spacewatch | LIX | 2.6 km | MPC · JPL |
| 443799 | 1995 UB_{19} | — | October 19, 1995 | Kitt Peak | Spacewatch | · | 1.9 km | MPC · JPL |
| 443800 | 1995 VL_{5} | — | November 14, 1995 | Kitt Peak | Spacewatch | · | 620 m | MPC · JPL |

== 443801–443900 ==
back to top

| Designation | | | Discovery | | | Properties | | Ref |
| Permanent | Provisional | Named after | Date | Site | Discoverer(s) | Category | Diam. | Ref |
|---|---|---|---|---|---|---|---|---|
| 443801 | 1996 LG_{3} | — | June 11, 1996 | Kitt Peak | Spacewatch | JUN | 1.1 km | MPC · JPL |
| 443802 | 1997 RH_{13} | — | September 6, 1997 | Caussols | ODAS | · | 770 m | MPC · JPL |
| 443803 | 1997 SE_{6} | — | September 23, 1997 | Kitt Peak | Spacewatch | · | 980 m | MPC · JPL |
| 443804 | 1997 SE_{23} | — | September 29, 1997 | Kitt Peak | Spacewatch | · | 1.3 km | MPC · JPL |
| 443805 | 1997 WW | — | November 20, 1997 | Kitt Peak | Spacewatch | CYB | 2.8 km | MPC · JPL |
| 443806 | 1998 FL_{3} | — | March 22, 1998 | Kitt Peak | Spacewatch | APO · PHA | 290 m | MPC · JPL |
| 443807 | 1998 FG_{48} | — | March 20, 1998 | Socorro | LINEAR | PHO | 1.5 km | MPC · JPL |
| 443808 | 1998 QP_{36} | — | August 17, 1998 | Socorro | LINEAR | · | 2.1 km | MPC · JPL |
| 443809 | 1998 TP_{38} | — | October 11, 1998 | Anderson Mesa | LONEOS | · | 1.6 km | MPC · JPL |
| 443810 | 1998 WF_{40} | — | November 16, 1998 | Kitt Peak | Spacewatch | · | 1.5 km | MPC · JPL |
| 443811 | 1998 XJ_{6} | — | December 8, 1998 | Kitt Peak | Spacewatch | · | 1.2 km | MPC · JPL |
| 443812 | 1999 RG_{31} | — | September 8, 1999 | Socorro | LINEAR | T_{j} (2.97) | 2.8 km | MPC · JPL |
| 443813 | 1999 TQ_{68} | — | October 9, 1999 | Kitt Peak | Spacewatch | EOS | 3.1 km | MPC · JPL |
| 443814 | 1999 TW_{81} | — | October 12, 1999 | Kitt Peak | Spacewatch | · | 890 m | MPC · JPL |
| 443815 | 1999 TH_{84} | — | October 6, 1999 | Kitt Peak | Spacewatch | · | 550 m | MPC · JPL |
| 443816 | 1999 TR_{107} | — | October 4, 1999 | Socorro | LINEAR | T_{j} (2.96) · 3:2 | 8.3 km | MPC · JPL |
| 443817 | 1999 TP_{211} | — | October 15, 1999 | Socorro | LINEAR | · | 2.6 km | MPC · JPL |
| 443818 | 1999 TS_{299} | — | October 2, 1999 | Kitt Peak | Spacewatch | THM | 1.7 km | MPC · JPL |
| 443819 | 1999 TT_{322} | — | October 8, 1999 | Socorro | LINEAR | H | 630 m | MPC · JPL |
| 443820 | 1999 UB_{18} | — | October 13, 1999 | Kitt Peak | Spacewatch | EOS | 1.9 km | MPC · JPL |
| 443821 | 1999 UO_{34} | — | October 6, 1999 | Socorro | LINEAR | · | 2.7 km | MPC · JPL |
| 443822 | 1999 VP_{101} | — | November 9, 1999 | Socorro | LINEAR | · | 3.3 km | MPC · JPL |
| 443823 | 1999 VN_{209} | — | November 14, 1999 | Kitt Peak | Spacewatch | · | 890 m | MPC · JPL |
| 443824 | 1999 WF_{14} | — | November 28, 1999 | Kitt Peak | Spacewatch | · | 2.3 km | MPC · JPL |
| 443825 | 1999 WX_{18} | — | November 30, 1999 | Kitt Peak | Spacewatch | · | 820 m | MPC · JPL |
| 443826 | 1999 XM_{187} | — | December 12, 1999 | Socorro | LINEAR | · | 2.1 km | MPC · JPL |
| 443827 | 2000 AW_{167} | — | January 8, 2000 | Socorro | LINEAR | · | 1.8 km | MPC · JPL |
| 443828 | 2000 CC_{79} | — | February 2, 2000 | Kitt Peak | Spacewatch | MIS | 2.2 km | MPC · JPL |
| 443829 | 2000 CZ_{123} | — | January 6, 2000 | Kitt Peak | Spacewatch | · | 2.4 km | MPC · JPL |
| 443830 | 2000 GP_{131} | — | April 7, 2000 | Kitt Peak | Spacewatch | · | 1.0 km | MPC · JPL |
| 443831 | 2000 HV_{80} | — | April 28, 2000 | Anderson Mesa | LONEOS | · | 1.1 km | MPC · JPL |
| 443832 | 2000 OP_{60} | — | August 1, 2000 | Socorro | LINEAR | · | 1.1 km | MPC · JPL |
| 443833 | 2000 QP_{110} | — | August 24, 2000 | Socorro | LINEAR | · | 1.2 km | MPC · JPL |
| 443834 | 2000 SO_{174} | — | September 28, 2000 | Socorro | LINEAR | · | 1.6 km | MPC · JPL |
| 443835 | 2000 SR_{229} | — | September 28, 2000 | Socorro | LINEAR | · | 1.4 km | MPC · JPL |
| 443836 | 2000 SM_{232} | — | September 28, 2000 | Socorro | LINEAR | · | 1.7 km | MPC · JPL |
| 443837 | 2000 TJ_{1} | — | October 1, 2000 | Socorro | LINEAR | AMO | 250 m | MPC · JPL |
| 443838 | 2000 UL_{29} | — | October 24, 2000 | Socorro | LINEAR | H | 510 m | MPC · JPL |
| 443839 | 2000 WW_{28} | — | November 23, 2000 | Drebach | J. Kandler | · | 1.3 km | MPC · JPL |
| 443840 | 2000 WT_{110} | — | November 20, 2000 | Socorro | LINEAR | · | 1.8 km | MPC · JPL |
| 443841 | 2000 WG_{170} | — | October 25, 2000 | Socorro | LINEAR | · | 1.5 km | MPC · JPL |
| 443842 | 2001 FA_{24} | — | March 19, 2001 | Socorro | LINEAR | · | 1.8 km | MPC · JPL |
| 443843 | 2001 FO_{185} | — | March 26, 2001 | Kitt Peak | M. W. Buie | cubewano (hot) | 166 km | MPC · JPL |
| 443844 | 2001 HU_{18} | — | April 25, 2001 | Anderson Mesa | LONEOS | · | 490 m | MPC · JPL |
| 443845 | 2001 OK_{36} | — | July 21, 2001 | Kitt Peak | Spacewatch | · | 720 m | MPC · JPL |
| 443846 | 2001 OR_{54} | — | July 22, 2001 | Palomar | NEAT | · | 2.1 km | MPC · JPL |
| 443847 | 2001 OJ_{113} | — | July 29, 2001 | Palomar | NEAT | · | 730 m | MPC · JPL |
| 443848 | 2001 PY_{29} | — | August 10, 2001 | Palomar | NEAT | · | 2.3 km | MPC · JPL |
| 443849 | 2001 QW_{170} | — | August 24, 2001 | Socorro | LINEAR | · | 670 m | MPC · JPL |
| 443850 | 2001 QC_{203} | — | August 23, 2001 | Anderson Mesa | LONEOS | · | 1.8 km | MPC · JPL |
| 443851 | 2001 QE_{261} | — | August 25, 2001 | Socorro | LINEAR | · | 1.2 km | MPC · JPL |
| 443852 | 2001 RB_{39} | — | September 9, 2001 | Socorro | LINEAR | · | 800 m | MPC · JPL |
| 443853 | 2001 RE_{41} | — | September 11, 2001 | Socorro | LINEAR | · | 810 m | MPC · JPL |
| 443854 | 2001 RM_{51} | — | September 12, 2001 | Socorro | LINEAR | · | 690 m | MPC · JPL |
| 443855 | 2001 RT_{99} | — | September 12, 2001 | Socorro | LINEAR | · | 780 m | MPC · JPL |
| 443856 | 2001 RC_{107} | — | September 11, 2001 | Anderson Mesa | LONEOS | · | 2.7 km | MPC · JPL |
| 443857 | 2001 SB_{4} | — | September 18, 2001 | Prescott | P. G. Comba | · | 780 m | MPC · JPL |
| 443858 | 2001 SY_{30} | — | September 16, 2001 | Socorro | LINEAR | · | 700 m | MPC · JPL |
| 443859 | 2001 SF_{77} | — | September 17, 2001 | Socorro | LINEAR | DOR | 2.9 km | MPC · JPL |
| 443860 | 2001 SP_{89} | — | September 20, 2001 | Socorro | LINEAR | · | 650 m | MPC · JPL |
| 443861 | 2001 SY_{195} | — | September 19, 2001 | Socorro | LINEAR | · | 2.6 km | MPC · JPL |
| 443862 | 2001 SX_{207} | — | September 19, 2001 | Socorro | LINEAR | V | 530 m | MPC · JPL |
| 443863 | 2001 SZ_{246} | — | September 19, 2001 | Socorro | LINEAR | · | 610 m | MPC · JPL |
| 443864 | 2001 SL_{267} | — | September 19, 2001 | Socorro | LINEAR | · | 1.8 km | MPC · JPL |
| 443865 | 2001 ST_{278} | — | September 21, 2001 | Anderson Mesa | LONEOS | · | 3.6 km | MPC · JPL |
| 443866 | 2001 SB_{293} | — | September 16, 2001 | Socorro | LINEAR | · | 500 m | MPC · JPL |
| 443867 | 2001 SM_{304} | — | September 20, 2001 | Socorro | LINEAR | · | 2.4 km | MPC · JPL |
| 443868 | 2001 SX_{339} | — | September 21, 2001 | Anderson Mesa | LONEOS | · | 640 m | MPC · JPL |
| 443869 | 2001 TO_{24} | — | October 14, 2001 | Socorro | LINEAR | · | 830 m | MPC · JPL |
| 443870 | 2001 TB_{25} | — | September 20, 2001 | Socorro | LINEAR | (18466) | 3.2 km | MPC · JPL |
| 443871 | 2001 TU_{50} | — | September 19, 2001 | Kitt Peak | Spacewatch | · | 2.0 km | MPC · JPL |
| 443872 | 2001 TK_{95} | — | September 20, 2001 | Socorro | LINEAR | DOR | 2.8 km | MPC · JPL |
| 443873 | 2001 TW_{99} | — | October 14, 2001 | Socorro | LINEAR | · | 940 m | MPC · JPL |
| 443874 | 2001 TV_{141} | — | October 10, 2001 | Palomar | NEAT | · | 730 m | MPC · JPL |
| 443875 | 2001 TZ_{146} | — | October 10, 2001 | Palomar | NEAT | · | 720 m | MPC · JPL |
| 443876 | 2001 TF_{161} | — | October 11, 2001 | Palomar | NEAT | · | 2.0 km | MPC · JPL |
| 443877 | 2001 TZ_{184} | — | October 14, 2001 | Socorro | LINEAR | · | 880 m | MPC · JPL |
| 443878 | 2001 TB_{213} | — | October 13, 2001 | Anderson Mesa | LONEOS | · | 680 m | MPC · JPL |
| 443879 | 2001 TL_{257} | — | October 10, 2001 | Palomar | NEAT | · | 890 m | MPC · JPL |
| 443880 | 2001 UZ_{16} | — | October 25, 2001 | Socorro | LINEAR | AMO · APO · PHA | 230 m | MPC · JPL |
| 443881 | 2001 UX_{43} | — | October 17, 2001 | Socorro | LINEAR | · | 740 m | MPC · JPL |
| 443882 | 2001 UO_{87} | — | October 21, 2001 | Kitt Peak | Spacewatch | · | 830 m | MPC · JPL |
| 443883 | 2001 UB_{101} | — | October 20, 2001 | Socorro | LINEAR | · | 1.6 km | MPC · JPL |
| 443884 | 2001 UZ_{110} | — | October 21, 2001 | Socorro | LINEAR | · | 1.1 km | MPC · JPL |
| 443885 | 2001 UX_{135} | — | October 22, 2001 | Socorro | LINEAR | · | 910 m | MPC · JPL |
| 443886 | 2001 UF_{229} | — | October 16, 2001 | Palomar | NEAT | · | 650 m | MPC · JPL |
| 443887 | 2001 VU_{5} | — | November 9, 2001 | Socorro | LINEAR | · | 850 m | MPC · JPL |
| 443888 | 2001 VX_{38} | — | November 9, 2001 | Socorro | LINEAR | · | 980 m | MPC · JPL |
| 443889 | 2001 VP_{109} | — | November 12, 2001 | Socorro | LINEAR | · | 550 m | MPC · JPL |
| 443890 | 2001 VO_{125} | — | November 11, 2001 | Kitt Peak | Spacewatch | NYS | 770 m | MPC · JPL |
| 443891 | 2001 WQ_{55} | — | November 19, 2001 | Socorro | LINEAR | · | 920 m | MPC · JPL |
| 443892 | 2001 XT_{4} | — | December 9, 2001 | Socorro | LINEAR | · | 1.1 km | MPC · JPL |
| 443893 | 2001 XT_{20} | — | December 9, 2001 | Socorro | LINEAR | · | 1.3 km | MPC · JPL |
| 443894 | 2001 XU_{104} | — | December 14, 2001 | Kitt Peak | Spacewatch | · | 880 m | MPC · JPL |
| 443895 | 2001 XP_{170} | — | December 14, 2001 | Socorro | LINEAR | T_{j} (2.97) · 3:2 | 4.5 km | MPC · JPL |
| 443896 | 2001 XH_{220} | — | December 15, 2001 | Socorro | LINEAR | · | 980 m | MPC · JPL |
| 443897 | 2001 YO_{36} | — | December 18, 2001 | Socorro | LINEAR | · | 800 m | MPC · JPL |
| 443898 | 2001 YO_{92} | — | December 17, 2001 | Kitt Peak | Spacewatch | · | 820 m | MPC · JPL |
| 443899 | 2002 AE_{19} | — | January 6, 2002 | Socorro | LINEAR | · | 4.1 km | MPC · JPL |
| 443900 | 2002 CU_{13} | — | February 8, 2002 | Desert Eagle | W. K. Y. Yeung | · | 1.2 km | MPC · JPL |

== 443901–444000 ==
back to top

| Designation | | | Discovery | | | Properties | | Ref |
| Permanent | Provisional | Named after | Date | Site | Discoverer(s) | Category | Diam. | Ref |
|---|---|---|---|---|---|---|---|---|
| 443901 | 2002 CD_{70} | — | February 7, 2002 | Socorro | LINEAR | · | 3.4 km | MPC · JPL |
| 443902 | 2002 CJ_{235} | — | February 12, 2002 | Kitt Peak | Spacewatch | · | 920 m | MPC · JPL |
| 443903 | 2002 CJ_{309} | — | February 11, 2002 | Socorro | LINEAR | · | 3.6 km | MPC · JPL |
| 443904 | 2002 DA_{14} | — | February 16, 2002 | Palomar | NEAT | · | 1.1 km | MPC · JPL |
| 443905 | 2002 EM_{24} | — | March 5, 2002 | Kitt Peak | Spacewatch | MAS | 560 m | MPC · JPL |
| 443906 | 2002 EY_{40} | — | March 9, 2002 | Socorro | LINEAR | slow | 5.2 km | MPC · JPL |
| 443907 | 2002 EB_{60} | — | March 13, 2002 | Socorro | LINEAR | T_{j} (2.99) | 3.9 km | MPC · JPL |
| 443908 | 2002 GA_{48} | — | March 16, 2002 | Kitt Peak | Spacewatch | · | 3.7 km | MPC · JPL |
| 443909 | 2002 GM_{74} | — | April 9, 2002 | Kitt Peak | Spacewatch | · | 1.4 km | MPC · JPL |
| 443910 | 2002 GC_{102} | — | April 10, 2002 | Socorro | LINEAR | · | 3.8 km | MPC · JPL |
| 443911 | 2002 GG_{183} | — | April 4, 2002 | Kitt Peak | Spacewatch | · | 3.7 km | MPC · JPL |
| 443912 | 2002 NF_{21} | — | July 9, 2002 | Socorro | LINEAR | · | 1.3 km | MPC · JPL |
| 443913 | 2002 PO | — | August 2, 2002 | Campo Imperatore | CINEOS | · | 1.3 km | MPC · JPL |
| 443914 | 2002 PW_{72} | — | August 12, 2002 | Socorro | LINEAR | · | 1.5 km | MPC · JPL |
| 443915 | 2002 PG_{112} | — | August 5, 2002 | Palomar | NEAT | · | 2.8 km | MPC · JPL |
| 443916 | 2002 PO_{157} | — | August 8, 2002 | Palomar | S. F. Hönig | · | 980 m | MPC · JPL |
| 443917 | 2002 PE_{179} | — | August 4, 2002 | Socorro | LINEAR | JUN | 1.0 km | MPC · JPL |
| 443918 | 2002 PZ_{187} | — | August 8, 2002 | Palomar | NEAT | · | 1.3 km | MPC · JPL |
| 443919 | 2002 QJ_{36} | — | August 30, 2002 | Palomar | NEAT | · | 560 m | MPC · JPL |
| 443920 | 2002 QW_{38} | — | August 30, 2002 | Kitt Peak | Spacewatch | · | 1.6 km | MPC · JPL |
| 443921 | 2002 QH_{41} | — | August 29, 2002 | Palomar | NEAT | · | 2.3 km | MPC · JPL |
| 443922 | 2002 QL_{110} | — | August 17, 2002 | Palomar | NEAT | · | 1.7 km | MPC · JPL |
| 443923 | 2002 RU_{25} | — | September 5, 2002 | Socorro | LINEAR | AMO +1km · slow | 3.3 km | MPC · JPL |
| 443924 | 2002 RS_{31} | — | September 4, 2002 | Anderson Mesa | LONEOS | · | 1.5 km | MPC · JPL |
| 443925 | 2002 RW_{81} | — | September 5, 2002 | Socorro | LINEAR | · | 1.7 km | MPC · JPL |
| 443926 | 2002 RS_{172} | — | September 13, 2002 | Palomar | NEAT | · | 1.4 km | MPC · JPL |
| 443927 | 2002 SK_{27} | — | September 29, 2002 | Haleakala | NEAT | · | 1.9 km | MPC · JPL |
| 443928 | 2002 SL_{47} | — | September 30, 2002 | Socorro | LINEAR | · | 1.6 km | MPC · JPL |
| 443929 | 2002 SB_{50} | — | September 30, 2002 | Haleakala | NEAT | · | 1.9 km | MPC · JPL |
| 443930 | 2002 SO_{56} | — | September 30, 2002 | Socorro | LINEAR | · | 650 m | MPC · JPL |
| 443931 | 2002 TR_{34} | — | October 2, 2002 | Socorro | LINEAR | · | 560 m | MPC · JPL |
| 443932 | 2002 TX_{135} | — | October 4, 2002 | Anderson Mesa | LONEOS | · | 720 m | MPC · JPL |
| 443933 | 2002 TU_{165} | — | August 13, 2002 | Socorro | LINEAR | · | 1.8 km | MPC · JPL |
| 443934 | 2002 TY_{214} | — | October 4, 2002 | Socorro | LINEAR | · | 1.7 km | MPC · JPL |
| 443935 | 2002 TY_{232} | — | October 6, 2002 | Socorro | LINEAR | · | 2.3 km | MPC · JPL |
| 443936 | 2002 TP_{299} | — | October 15, 2002 | Palomar | NEAT | · | 1.5 km | MPC · JPL |
| 443937 | 2002 TF_{311} | — | October 4, 2002 | Apache Point | SDSS | · | 1.0 km | MPC · JPL |
| 443938 | 2002 TB_{329} | — | October 5, 2002 | Apache Point | SDSS | MIS | 2.3 km | MPC · JPL |
| 443939 | 2002 UR_{8} | — | September 15, 2002 | Anderson Mesa | LONEOS | JUN | 1.3 km | MPC · JPL |
| 443940 | 2002 UD_{31} | — | October 28, 2002 | Haleakala | NEAT | · | 1.7 km | MPC · JPL |
| 443941 | 2002 UJ_{66} | — | October 30, 2002 | Apache Point | SDSS | · | 1.2 km | MPC · JPL |
| 443942 | 2002 VG_{14} | — | November 5, 2002 | Socorro | LINEAR | H | 570 m | MPC · JPL |
| 443943 | 2002 VT_{23} | — | November 5, 2002 | Socorro | LINEAR | · | 1.4 km | MPC · JPL |
| 443944 | 2002 VE_{71} | — | November 7, 2002 | Socorro | LINEAR | · | 660 m | MPC · JPL |
| 443945 | 2002 VL_{87} | — | November 8, 2002 | Socorro | LINEAR | · | 2.3 km | MPC · JPL |
| 443946 | 2002 VF_{96} | — | November 11, 2002 | Socorro | LINEAR | · | 2.2 km | MPC · JPL |
| 443947 | 2002 VY_{116} | — | October 11, 1993 | Kitt Peak | Spacewatch | · | 2.0 km | MPC · JPL |
| 443948 | 2002 XO_{32} | — | December 6, 2002 | Socorro | LINEAR | · | 3.0 km | MPC · JPL |
| 443949 | 2002 XR_{32} | — | December 6, 2002 | Socorro | LINEAR | · | 2.4 km | MPC · JPL |
| 443950 | 2002 XZ_{39} | — | December 11, 2002 | Socorro | LINEAR | · | 580 m | MPC · JPL |
| 443951 | 2003 AX_{15} | — | January 4, 2003 | Socorro | LINEAR | · | 770 m | MPC · JPL |
| 443952 | 2003 BJ_{73} | — | January 29, 2003 | Palomar | NEAT | · | 1.9 km | MPC · JPL |
| 443953 | 2003 DW_{17} | — | February 19, 2003 | Palomar | NEAT | · | 1.1 km | MPC · JPL |
| 443954 | 2003 EU_{13} | — | March 6, 2003 | Palomar | NEAT | · | 1.7 km | MPC · JPL |
| 443955 | 2003 EC_{43} | — | March 10, 2003 | Kitt Peak | Spacewatch | · | 1.1 km | MPC · JPL |
| 443956 | 2003 GD_{57} | — | April 7, 2003 | Kitt Peak | Spacewatch | · | 860 m | MPC · JPL |
| 443957 | 2003 HM_{34} | — | April 29, 2003 | Kitt Peak | Spacewatch | NYS | 1.1 km | MPC · JPL |
| 443958 | 2003 HW_{36} | — | April 29, 2003 | Kitt Peak | Spacewatch | · | 2.6 km | MPC · JPL |
| 443959 | 2003 HS_{43} | — | April 30, 2003 | Kitt Peak | Spacewatch | · | 1.8 km | MPC · JPL |
| 443960 | 2003 JH_{6} | — | May 1, 2003 | Socorro | LINEAR | PHO | 1.3 km | MPC · JPL |
| 443961 | 2003 KO_{28} | — | April 9, 2003 | Kitt Peak | Spacewatch | · | 2.5 km | MPC · JPL |
| 443962 | 2003 QR_{42} | — | August 22, 2003 | Palomar | NEAT | · | 900 m | MPC · JPL |
| 443963 | 2003 RM_{27} | — | September 15, 2003 | Palomar | NEAT | · | 920 m | MPC · JPL |
| 443964 | 2003 SF_{92} | — | September 18, 2003 | Kitt Peak | Spacewatch | · | 710 m | MPC · JPL |
| 443965 | 2003 SA_{150} | — | September 17, 2003 | Socorro | LINEAR | · | 1.1 km | MPC · JPL |
| 443966 | 2003 SQ_{174} | — | September 18, 2003 | Kitt Peak | Spacewatch | · | 790 m | MPC · JPL |
| 443967 | 2003 SA_{241} | — | September 27, 2003 | Kitt Peak | Spacewatch | · | 670 m | MPC · JPL |
| 443968 | 2003 SX_{273} | — | September 28, 2003 | Socorro | LINEAR | · | 940 m | MPC · JPL |
| 443969 | 2003 SX_{304} | — | September 17, 2003 | Palomar | NEAT | · | 1.5 km | MPC · JPL |
| 443970 | 2003 SB_{312} | — | September 30, 2003 | Desert Eagle | W. K. Y. Yeung | · | 570 m | MPC · JPL |
| 443971 | 2003 SR_{318} | — | September 18, 2003 | Kitt Peak | Spacewatch | · | 690 m | MPC · JPL |
| 443972 | 2003 TN_{1} | — | October 5, 2003 | Socorro | LINEAR | AMO | 420 m | MPC · JPL |
| 443973 | 2003 TX_{26} | — | September 20, 2003 | Kitt Peak | Spacewatch | PHO | 1.1 km | MPC · JPL |
| 443974 | 2003 TK_{54} | — | October 5, 2003 | Kitt Peak | Spacewatch | · | 1.1 km | MPC · JPL |
| 443975 | 2003 UF_{104} | — | October 17, 2003 | Kitt Peak | Spacewatch | · | 1.6 km | MPC · JPL |
| 443976 | 2003 UY_{196} | — | October 21, 2003 | Kitt Peak | Spacewatch | · | 1.1 km | MPC · JPL |
| 443977 | 2003 UE_{234} | — | October 24, 2003 | Socorro | LINEAR | · | 720 m | MPC · JPL |
| 443978 | 2003 UV_{277} | — | October 25, 2003 | Socorro | LINEAR | · | 1.4 km | MPC · JPL |
| 443979 | 2003 UJ_{278} | — | September 28, 2003 | Kitt Peak | Spacewatch | (5) | 900 m | MPC · JPL |
| 443980 | 2003 UP_{355} | — | October 19, 2003 | Kitt Peak | Spacewatch | · | 890 m | MPC · JPL |
| 443981 | 2003 UF_{379} | — | October 22, 2003 | Apache Point | SDSS | (194) | 800 m | MPC · JPL |
| 443982 | 2003 VF_{4} | — | November 14, 2003 | Palomar | NEAT | (5) | 1.5 km | MPC · JPL |
| 443983 | 2003 WP_{19} | — | November 19, 2003 | Socorro | LINEAR | EUN | 1.2 km | MPC · JPL |
| 443984 | 2003 WT_{35} | — | November 19, 2003 | Catalina | CSS | · | 1.1 km | MPC · JPL |
| 443985 | 2003 WD_{54} | — | November 20, 2003 | Kitt Peak | Spacewatch | · | 1.1 km | MPC · JPL |
| 443986 | 2003 WA_{74} | — | November 20, 2003 | Socorro | LINEAR | · | 930 m | MPC · JPL |
| 443987 | 2003 WP_{77} | — | November 20, 2003 | Campo Imperatore | CINEOS | · | 1.2 km | MPC · JPL |
| 443988 | 2003 WU_{115} | — | November 20, 2003 | Socorro | LINEAR | · | 1.4 km | MPC · JPL |
| 443989 | 2003 WD_{120} | — | November 20, 2003 | Socorro | LINEAR | · | 1.3 km | MPC · JPL |
| 443990 | 2003 WQ_{134} | — | November 21, 2003 | Socorro | LINEAR | · | 1.2 km | MPC · JPL |
| 443991 | 2003 WA_{137} | — | November 21, 2003 | Socorro | LINEAR | · | 1.4 km | MPC · JPL |
| 443992 | 2003 WT_{171} | — | November 29, 2003 | Kingsnake | J. V. McClusky | · | 1.0 km | MPC · JPL |
| 443993 | 2003 XS_{2} | — | December 1, 2003 | Socorro | LINEAR | · | 1.1 km | MPC · JPL |
| 443994 | 2003 XN_{10} | — | December 5, 2003 | Socorro | LINEAR | · | 2.1 km | MPC · JPL |
| 443995 | 2003 XT_{12} | — | December 14, 2003 | Palomar | NEAT | · | 1.1 km | MPC · JPL |
| 443996 | 2003 YD_{5} | — | December 16, 2003 | Catalina | CSS | EUN | 1.3 km | MPC · JPL |
| 443997 | 2003 YZ_{19} | — | December 17, 2003 | Kitt Peak | Spacewatch | · | 1.3 km | MPC · JPL |
| 443998 | 2003 YO_{27} | — | December 17, 2003 | Kitt Peak | Spacewatch | · | 1.5 km | MPC · JPL |
| 443999 | 2003 YH_{33} | — | December 16, 2003 | Kitt Peak | Spacewatch | · | 970 m | MPC · JPL |
| 444000 | 2003 YV_{36} | — | December 17, 2003 | Kitt Peak | Spacewatch | · | 1.1 km | MPC · JPL |

back to top
