= List of minor planets: 537001–538000 =

The following is a partial list of minor planets, running from minor-planet number 537001 through 538000, inclusive. The primary data for this and other partial lists is based on JPL's "Small-Body Orbital Elements" and data available from the Minor Planet Center. Critical list information is also provided by the MPC, unless otherwise specified from Lowell Observatory. A detailed description of the table's columns and additional sources are given on the main page including a complete list of every page in this series, and a statistical break-up on the dynamical classification of minor planets.

Also see the summary list of all named bodies in numerical and alphabetical order, and the corresponding naming citations for the number range of this particular list. New namings may only be added to this list after official publication, as the preannouncement of names is condemned by the Working Group for Small Bodies Nomenclature of the International Astronomical Union.

Near-Earth obj.	MBA (inner)	MBA (outer)	Centaur
Mars-crosser	MBA (middle)	Jupiter trojan	Trans-Neptunian obj.
Unclassified

== 537001–537100 ==
Designation			Discovery			Properties		Ref
Permanent	Provisional	Named after	Date	Site	Discoverer(s)	Category	Diam.	Ref
537001	2015 FQ_{405}	—	March 25, 2015	Mount Lemmon	Mount Lemmon Survey	·	1.3 km	MPC · JPL
537002	2015 FT_{405}	—	November 9, 2013	Mount Lemmon	Mount Lemmon Survey	·	990 m	MPC · JPL
537003	2015 FV_{405}	—	May 24, 2011	Mount Lemmon	Mount Lemmon Survey	·	1.0 km	MPC · JPL
537004	2015 FL_{406}	—	December 6, 2012	Mount Lemmon	Mount Lemmon Survey	·	1.6 km	MPC · JPL
537005	2015 FN_{406}	—	October 20, 2007	Kitt Peak	Spacewatch	TEL	1.1 km	MPC · JPL
537006	2015 FP_{406}	—	April 14, 2007	Mount Lemmon	Mount Lemmon Survey	·	1.2 km	MPC · JPL
537007	2015 FX_{406}	—	January 22, 2015	Haleakala	Pan-STARRS 1	·	2.2 km	MPC · JPL
537008	2015 FA_{407}	—	March 13, 2011	Mount Lemmon	Mount Lemmon Survey	KON	1.6 km	MPC · JPL
537009	2015 FC_{407}	—	January 20, 2015	Haleakala	Pan-STARRS 1	EOS	1.7 km	MPC · JPL
537010	2015 FD_{407}	—	September 16, 2012	Kitt Peak	Spacewatch	·	2.9 km	MPC · JPL
537011	2015 FE_{407}	—	March 21, 2015	Haleakala	Pan-STARRS 1	·	850 m	MPC · JPL
537012	2015 FF_{407}	—	October 26, 2013	Mount Lemmon	Mount Lemmon Survey	·	1.0 km	MPC · JPL
537013	2015 FM_{407}	—	August 26, 2012	Catalina	CSS	·	1.0 km	MPC · JPL
537014	2015 FQ_{407}	—	November 24, 2009	Kitt Peak	Spacewatch	·	1.1 km	MPC · JPL
537015	2015 FR_{407}	—	December 4, 2013	Haleakala	Pan-STARRS 1	·	1.6 km	MPC · JPL
537016	2015 FD_{408}	—	March 21, 2015	Haleakala	Pan-STARRS 1	·	1.6 km	MPC · JPL
537017	2015 FG_{408}	—	March 21, 2015	Haleakala	Pan-STARRS 1	(5)	1.0 km	MPC · JPL
537018	2015 FL_{408}	—	March 21, 2015	Haleakala	Pan-STARRS 1	·	1.3 km	MPC · JPL
537019	2015 FW_{408}	—	April 30, 2006	Kitt Peak	Spacewatch	MRX	810 m	MPC · JPL
537020	2015 FA_{409}	—	December 26, 2006	Kitt Peak	Spacewatch	·	1.0 km	MPC · JPL
537021	2015 FK_{409}	—	March 22, 2015	Haleakala	Pan-STARRS 1	MAR	790 m	MPC · JPL
537022	2015 FP_{409}	—	March 22, 2015	Haleakala	Pan-STARRS 1	·	1.6 km	MPC · JPL
537023	2015 FR_{409}	—	November 19, 2006	Kitt Peak	Spacewatch	CYB	3.7 km	MPC · JPL
537024	2015 FA_{410}	—	February 18, 2010	Mount Lemmon	Mount Lemmon Survey	·	1.6 km	MPC · JPL
537025	2015 FC_{410}	—	February 19, 2010	Mount Lemmon	Mount Lemmon Survey	·	1.6 km	MPC · JPL
537026	2015 FD_{410}	—	March 22, 2015	Haleakala	Pan-STARRS 1	·	2.0 km	MPC · JPL
537027	2015 FH_{410}	—	March 22, 2015	Haleakala	Pan-STARRS 1	RAF	810 m	MPC · JPL
537028	2015 FJ_{410}	—	April 29, 2011	Mount Lemmon	Mount Lemmon Survey	·	930 m	MPC · JPL
537029	2015 FU_{410}	—	January 28, 2015	Haleakala	Pan-STARRS 1	·	1.1 km	MPC · JPL
537030	2015 FA_{411}	—	November 9, 2007	Kitt Peak	Spacewatch	·	2.7 km	MPC · JPL
537031	2015 FK_{411}	—	March 25, 2015	Haleakala	Pan-STARRS 1	BRA	1.0 km	MPC · JPL
537032	2015 FZ_{411}	—	November 9, 2013	Haleakala	Pan-STARRS 1	·	1.2 km	MPC · JPL
537033	2015 FD_{412}	—	April 27, 2011	Mount Lemmon	Mount Lemmon Survey	·	1.1 km	MPC · JPL
537034	2015 FT_{412}	—	April 15, 2007	Kitt Peak	Spacewatch	·	1.0 km	MPC · JPL
537035	2015 FX_{412}	—	January 23, 2015	Haleakala	Pan-STARRS 1	·	1.8 km	MPC · JPL
537036	2015 FE_{413}	—	April 5, 2011	Mount Lemmon	Mount Lemmon Survey	·	1.1 km	MPC · JPL
537037	2015 FK_{413}	—	March 29, 2015	Haleakala	Pan-STARRS 1	·	2.5 km	MPC · JPL
537038	2015 FL_{413}	—	August 26, 2012	Haleakala	Pan-STARRS 1	MAR	930 m	MPC · JPL
537039	2015 FO_{413}	—	January 25, 2009	Kitt Peak	Spacewatch	THM	2.0 km	MPC · JPL
537040	2015 FP_{413}	—	October 18, 2012	Haleakala	Pan-STARRS 1	·	1.8 km	MPC · JPL
537041	2015 FV_{413}	—	March 30, 2015	Haleakala	Pan-STARRS 1	EOS	1.4 km	MPC · JPL
537042	2015 FM_{414}	—	January 28, 2014	Kitt Peak	Spacewatch	·	1.8 km	MPC · JPL
537043	2015 FT_{414}	—	January 7, 2006	Mount Lemmon	Mount Lemmon Survey	·	1.1 km	MPC · JPL
537044	2015 FA_{415}	—	November 12, 2007	Mount Lemmon	Mount Lemmon Survey	EOS	1.6 km	MPC · JPL
537045	2015 FC_{415}	—	March 25, 2015	Haleakala	Pan-STARRS 1	·	2.1 km	MPC · JPL
537046	2015 GO_{2}	—	January 21, 2015	Haleakala	Pan-STARRS 1	AEO	1.1 km	MPC · JPL
537047	2015 GC_{3}	—	October 26, 2013	Mount Lemmon	Mount Lemmon Survey	·	1.3 km	MPC · JPL
537048	2015 GG_{3}	—	September 17, 2012	Mount Lemmon	Mount Lemmon Survey	(5)	1.1 km	MPC · JPL
537049	2015 GQ_{3}	—	April 28, 2011	Mount Lemmon	Mount Lemmon Survey	·	830 m	MPC · JPL
537050	2015 GN_{4}	—	October 17, 2007	Mount Lemmon	Mount Lemmon Survey	URS	2.8 km	MPC · JPL
537051	2015 GR_{5}	—	October 18, 2012	Haleakala	Pan-STARRS 1	·	1.4 km	MPC · JPL
537052	2015 GW_{5}	—	March 17, 2015	Haleakala	Pan-STARRS 1	·	1.8 km	MPC · JPL
537053	2015 GC_{8}	—	February 22, 2010	WISE	WISE	·	3.5 km	MPC · JPL
537054	2015 GN_{8}	—	April 18, 2010	WISE	WISE	·	1.9 km	MPC · JPL
537055	2015 GY_{9}	—	December 18, 2009	Kitt Peak	Spacewatch	·	1.8 km	MPC · JPL
537056	2015 GY_{11}	—	January 21, 2015	Haleakala	Pan-STARRS 1	URS	2.7 km	MPC · JPL
537057	2015 GT_{13}	—	April 14, 2010	WISE	WISE	·	3.6 km	MPC · JPL
537058	2015 GD_{14}	—	September 3, 2013	Haleakala	Pan-STARRS 1	H	340 m	MPC · JPL
537059	2015 GU_{14}	—	January 21, 2015	Haleakala	Pan-STARRS 1	·	1.1 km	MPC · JPL
537060	2015 GW_{15}	—	October 6, 2012	Mount Lemmon	Mount Lemmon Survey	·	2.8 km	MPC · JPL
537061	2015 GP_{16}	—	January 2, 2014	Mount Lemmon	Mount Lemmon Survey	·	2.8 km	MPC · JPL
537062	2015 GO_{17}	—	January 25, 2006	Kitt Peak	Spacewatch	MIS	2.1 km	MPC · JPL
537063	2015 GH_{22}	—	March 19, 2010	Mount Lemmon	Mount Lemmon Survey	·	2.0 km	MPC · JPL
537064	2015 GD_{24}	—	February 2, 2009	Mount Lemmon	Mount Lemmon Survey	·	3.5 km	MPC · JPL
537065	2015 GZ_{24}	—	June 16, 2010	Mount Lemmon	Mount Lemmon Survey	·	3.3 km	MPC · JPL
537066	2015 GB_{25}	—	February 23, 2015	Haleakala	Pan-STARRS 1	·	980 m	MPC · JPL
537067	2015 GP_{25}	—	January 28, 2015	Haleakala	Pan-STARRS 1	EUN	1.2 km	MPC · JPL
537068	2015 GS_{25}	—	January 28, 2015	Haleakala	Pan-STARRS 1	EUN	1.2 km	MPC · JPL
537069	2015 GT_{25}	—	January 26, 2006	Mount Lemmon	Mount Lemmon Survey	·	1.6 km	MPC · JPL
537070	2015 GD_{26}	—	January 28, 2015	Haleakala	Pan-STARRS 1	LIX	2.8 km	MPC · JPL
537071	2015 GR_{26}	—	November 26, 2014	Haleakala	Pan-STARRS 1	·	1.1 km	MPC · JPL
537072	2015 GW_{26}	—	August 19, 2006	Kitt Peak	Spacewatch	·	2.9 km	MPC · JPL
537073	2015 GZ_{26}	—	February 22, 2009	Catalina	CSS	·	4.1 km	MPC · JPL
537074	2015 GC_{28}	—	November 10, 2013	Kitt Peak	Spacewatch	·	1.5 km	MPC · JPL
537075	2015 GD_{28}	—	January 23, 2015	Haleakala	Pan-STARRS 1	EUN	1.0 km	MPC · JPL
537076	2015 GA_{29}	—	December 3, 2013	Haleakala	Pan-STARRS 1	·	1.5 km	MPC · JPL
537077	2015 GT_{29}	—	October 24, 2008	Kitt Peak	Spacewatch	AGN	1.1 km	MPC · JPL
537078	2015 GF_{31}	—	August 12, 2012	Siding Spring	SSS	MAS	770 m	MPC · JPL
537079	2015 GC_{32}	—	April 14, 2010	Mount Lemmon	Mount Lemmon Survey	·	1.9 km	MPC · JPL
537080	2015 GG_{32}	—	May 11, 2010	Mount Lemmon	Mount Lemmon Survey	·	3.4 km	MPC · JPL
537081	2015 GV_{33}	—	November 19, 2008	Mount Lemmon	Mount Lemmon Survey	·	1.8 km	MPC · JPL
537082	2015 GA_{34}	—	January 29, 2014	Catalina	CSS	URS	2.8 km	MPC · JPL
537083	2015 GO_{34}	—	February 1, 2006	Kitt Peak	Spacewatch	·	1.4 km	MPC · JPL
537084	2015 GU_{36}	—	January 27, 2006	Mount Lemmon	Mount Lemmon Survey	·	1.1 km	MPC · JPL
537085	2015 GW_{36}	—	February 6, 2011	Kitt Peak	Spacewatch	·	1.2 km	MPC · JPL
537086	2015 GF_{37}	—	November 19, 2009	Mount Lemmon	Mount Lemmon Survey	·	890 m	MPC · JPL
537087	2015 GQ_{37}	—	August 28, 2006	Kitt Peak	Spacewatch	·	2.7 km	MPC · JPL
537088	2015 GT_{37}	—	January 17, 2009	Kitt Peak	Spacewatch	·	2.6 km	MPC · JPL
537089	2015 GX_{37}	—	January 6, 2006	Kitt Peak	Spacewatch	·	890 m	MPC · JPL
537090	2015 GG_{38}	—	February 1, 2009	Kitt Peak	Spacewatch	·	2.3 km	MPC · JPL
537091	2015 GV_{38}	—	March 27, 2015	Haleakala	Pan-STARRS 1	·	1.7 km	MPC · JPL
537092	2015 GP_{40}	—	January 25, 2015	Haleakala	Pan-STARRS 1	TIR	2.9 km	MPC · JPL
537093	2015 GR_{40}	—	October 27, 2008	Kitt Peak	Spacewatch	·	1.6 km	MPC · JPL
537094	2015 GJ_{41}	—	December 31, 2013	Mount Lemmon	Mount Lemmon Survey	·	2.1 km	MPC · JPL
537095	2015 GH_{42}	—	February 4, 2009	Mount Lemmon	Mount Lemmon Survey	·	3.4 km	MPC · JPL
537096	2015 GU_{45}	—	September 23, 2008	Mount Lemmon	Mount Lemmon Survey	·	1.1 km	MPC · JPL
537097	2015 GX_{45}	—	May 14, 2011	Mount Lemmon	Mount Lemmon Survey	·	1.7 km	MPC · JPL
537098	2015 GZ_{45}	—	April 13, 2015	Haleakala	Pan-STARRS 1	AMO	530 m	MPC · JPL
537099	2015 GM_{51}	—	September 11, 2007	Mount Lemmon	Mount Lemmon Survey	·	3.1 km	MPC · JPL
537100	2015 GP_{51}	—	January 1, 2014	Haleakala	Pan-STARRS 1	·	1.4 km	MPC · JPL

== 537101–537200 ==
back to top

Designation			Discovery			Properties		Ref
Permanent	Provisional	Named after	Date	Site	Discoverer(s)	Category	Diam.	Ref
537101	2015 GR_{51}	—	November 19, 2012	Kitt Peak	Spacewatch	EOS	1.7 km	MPC · JPL
537102	2015 GS_{51}	—	October 15, 2007	Kitt Peak	Spacewatch	·	1.6 km	MPC · JPL
537103	2015 GU_{51}	—	June 16, 2010	WISE	WISE	ULA · CYB	5.7 km	MPC · JPL
537104	2015 GX_{51}	—	December 18, 2007	Mount Lemmon	Mount Lemmon Survey	·	2.9 km	MPC · JPL
537105	2015 GC_{52}	—	January 13, 2010	WISE	WISE	·	2.3 km	MPC · JPL
537106	2015 GH_{52}	—	October 1, 2008	Mount Lemmon	Mount Lemmon Survey	·	1.7 km	MPC · JPL
537107	2015 GY_{52}	—	January 25, 2015	Haleakala	Pan-STARRS 1	BRG	1.3 km	MPC · JPL
537108	2015 GB_{53}	—	April 12, 2015	Haleakala	Pan-STARRS 1	·	2.6 km	MPC · JPL
537109	2015 GE_{53}	—	December 29, 2013	Haleakala	Pan-STARRS 1	JUN	850 m	MPC · JPL
537110	2015 GR_{53}	—	June 9, 2007	Kitt Peak	Spacewatch	EUN	870 m	MPC · JPL
537111	2015 GS_{53}	—	April 14, 2015	Kitt Peak	Spacewatch	·	1.3 km	MPC · JPL
537112	2015 GV_{53}	—	December 11, 2013	Haleakala	Pan-STARRS 1	·	1.5 km	MPC · JPL
537113	2015 GD_{54}	—	July 4, 2005	Mount Lemmon	Mount Lemmon Survey	·	2.5 km	MPC · JPL
537114	2015 GE_{54}	—	April 14, 2015	Kitt Peak	Spacewatch	·	2.4 km	MPC · JPL
537115	2015 HD	—	May 4, 2000	Kitt Peak	Spacewatch	H	340 m	MPC · JPL
537116	2015 HO	—	January 28, 2015	Haleakala	Pan-STARRS 1	·	1.6 km	MPC · JPL
537117	2015 HY_{2}	—	May 8, 2011	Mount Lemmon	Mount Lemmon Survey	·	1.4 km	MPC · JPL
537118	2015 HZ_{2}	—	January 20, 2015	Haleakala	Pan-STARRS 1	EUN	1.1 km	MPC · JPL
537119	2015 HM_{3}	—	January 29, 1998	Kitt Peak	Spacewatch	·	940 m	MPC · JPL
537120	2015 HF_{4}	—	November 28, 2013	Mount Lemmon	Mount Lemmon Survey	·	1.2 km	MPC · JPL
537121	2015 HG_{5}	—	July 18, 2013	Haleakala	Pan-STARRS 1	·	1.8 km	MPC · JPL
537122	2015 HN_{5}	—	October 8, 2007	Catalina	CSS	LIX	3.6 km	MPC · JPL
537123	2015 HR_{5}	—	January 26, 2015	Haleakala	Pan-STARRS 1	·	3.5 km	MPC · JPL
537124	2015 HL_{7}	—	April 2, 2011	Haleakala	Pan-STARRS 1	·	1.2 km	MPC · JPL
537125	2015 HL_{9}	—	April 8, 2010	Kitt Peak	Spacewatch	H	370 m	MPC · JPL
537126	2015 HB_{11}	—	March 21, 2010	WISE	WISE	·	2.0 km	MPC · JPL
537127	2015 HS_{12}	—	October 24, 2005	Kitt Peak	Spacewatch	·	1.0 km	MPC · JPL
537128	2015 HT_{13}	—	January 11, 2010	Kitt Peak	Spacewatch	·	1.5 km	MPC · JPL
537129	2015 HU_{15}	—	March 16, 2010	WISE	WISE	·	1.6 km	MPC · JPL
537130	2015 HJ_{24}	—	April 27, 2011	Kitt Peak	Spacewatch	·	810 m	MPC · JPL
537131	2015 HR_{24}	—	April 26, 2006	Kitt Peak	Spacewatch	MRX	920 m	MPC · JPL
537132	2015 HP_{28}	—	December 6, 2007	Mount Lemmon	Mount Lemmon Survey	·	2.5 km	MPC · JPL
537133	2015 HN_{33}	—	October 6, 2008	Kitt Peak	Spacewatch	MRX	870 m	MPC · JPL
537134	2015 HB_{37}	—	December 13, 2007	Socorro	LINEAR	·	3.3 km	MPC · JPL
537135	2015 HF_{39}	—	May 26, 2010	WISE	WISE	·	2.5 km	MPC · JPL
537136	2015 HV_{43}	—	October 3, 2013	Catalina	CSS	MAR	1.1 km	MPC · JPL
537137	2015 HA_{46}	—	December 26, 2013	Haleakala	Pan-STARRS 1	·	1.7 km	MPC · JPL
537138	2015 HA_{49}	—	March 27, 2015	Haleakala	Pan-STARRS 1	·	1.8 km	MPC · JPL
537139	2015 HP_{57}	—	April 18, 2015	Haleakala	Pan-STARRS 1	RAF	760 m	MPC · JPL
537140	2015 HO_{60}	—	May 13, 2010	Mount Lemmon	Mount Lemmon Survey	·	2.4 km	MPC · JPL
537141	2015 HP_{60}	—	July 25, 2011	Haleakala	Pan-STARRS 1	·	2.0 km	MPC · JPL
537142	2015 HR_{60}	—	July 27, 2011	Haleakala	Pan-STARRS 1	·	1.5 km	MPC · JPL
537143	2015 HV_{60}	—	April 18, 2015	Haleakala	Pan-STARRS 1	·	3.5 km	MPC · JPL
537144	2015 HQ_{61}	—	May 21, 2011	Haleakala	Pan-STARRS 1	·	1.1 km	MPC · JPL
537145	2015 HK_{69}	—	October 8, 2007	Mount Lemmon	Mount Lemmon Survey	·	2.8 km	MPC · JPL
537146	2015 HS_{69}	—	February 14, 2015	Mount Lemmon	Mount Lemmon Survey	·	1.2 km	MPC · JPL
537147	2015 HB_{74}	—	October 15, 2012	Kitt Peak	Spacewatch	KOR	1.3 km	MPC · JPL
537148	2015 HV_{74}	—	May 10, 2004	Kitt Peak	Spacewatch	EOS	2.5 km	MPC · JPL
537149	2015 HP_{75}	—	October 3, 2008	Kitt Peak	Spacewatch	·	1.6 km	MPC · JPL
537150	2015 HF_{78}	—	October 18, 2007	Mount Lemmon	Mount Lemmon Survey	KOR	1.1 km	MPC · JPL
537151	2015 HX_{78}	—	September 28, 2003	Kitt Peak	Spacewatch	·	1.5 km	MPC · JPL
537152	2015 HQ_{80}	—	September 11, 2007	Kitt Peak	Spacewatch	·	1.6 km	MPC · JPL
537153	2015 HA_{82}	—	February 22, 2006	Catalina	CSS	·	1.4 km	MPC · JPL
537154	2015 HJ_{82}	—	October 16, 2003	Kitt Peak	Spacewatch	·	1.7 km	MPC · JPL
537155	2015 HO_{82}	—	September 10, 2007	Catalina	CSS	·	1.5 km	MPC · JPL
537156	2015 HH_{83}	—	September 16, 2003	Kitt Peak	Spacewatch	·	1.2 km	MPC · JPL
537157	2015 HN_{85}	—	October 27, 2008	Mount Lemmon	Mount Lemmon Survey	·	1.3 km	MPC · JPL
537158	2015 HM_{86}	—	March 14, 2010	Mount Lemmon	Mount Lemmon Survey	AGN	970 m	MPC · JPL
537159	2015 HA_{87}	—	April 8, 2010	Kitt Peak	Spacewatch	·	2.2 km	MPC · JPL
537160	2015 HB_{89}	—	January 1, 2009	Kitt Peak	Spacewatch	·	1.9 km	MPC · JPL
537161	2015 HK_{90}	—	October 8, 2012	Kitt Peak	Spacewatch	·	1.1 km	MPC · JPL
537162	2015 HM_{91}	—	November 9, 2008	Kitt Peak	Spacewatch	·	1.6 km	MPC · JPL
537163	2015 HO_{95}	—	February 15, 2010	Kitt Peak	Spacewatch	·	1.4 km	MPC · JPL
537164	2015 HX_{95}	—	April 3, 2009	Mount Lemmon	Mount Lemmon Survey	·	2.8 km	MPC · JPL
537165	2015 HG_{100}	—	May 3, 2011	Mount Lemmon	Mount Lemmon Survey	·	1.5 km	MPC · JPL
537166	2015 HL_{102}	—	February 25, 2006	Kitt Peak	Spacewatch	·	1.4 km	MPC · JPL
537167	2015 HR_{102}	—	October 8, 2012	Mount Lemmon	Mount Lemmon Survey	·	1.7 km	MPC · JPL
537168	2015 HS_{102}	—	September 27, 2006	Mount Lemmon	Mount Lemmon Survey	·	740 m	MPC · JPL
537169	2015 HT_{102}	—	October 20, 2008	Mount Lemmon	Mount Lemmon Survey	EUN	950 m	MPC · JPL
537170 Gerazhukov	2015 HU_{106}	Gerazhukov	November 17, 2009	Zelenchukskaya	B. Satovski, T. V. Krjačko	·	2.9 km	MPC · JPL
537171	2015 HJ_{107}	—	May 27, 2011	Kitt Peak	Spacewatch	·	990 m	MPC · JPL
537172	2015 HR_{116}	—	November 12, 2005	Kitt Peak	Spacewatch	H	410 m	MPC · JPL
537173	2015 HE_{121}	—	October 11, 2012	Mount Lemmon	Mount Lemmon Survey	·	1.6 km	MPC · JPL
537174	2015 HU_{123}	—	April 4, 2010	Kitt Peak	Spacewatch	·	2.7 km	MPC · JPL
537175	2015 HK_{127}	—	October 15, 2004	Mount Lemmon	Mount Lemmon Survey	·	1.5 km	MPC · JPL
537176	2015 HN_{135}	—	April 23, 2015	Haleakala	Pan-STARRS 1	·	940 m	MPC · JPL
537177	2015 HQ_{137}	—	October 6, 2012	Haleakala	Pan-STARRS 1	·	1.3 km	MPC · JPL
537178	2015 HM_{143}	—	October 11, 2012	Haleakala	Pan-STARRS 1	·	1.3 km	MPC · JPL
537179	2015 HQ_{143}	—	January 19, 2004	Kitt Peak	Spacewatch	·	830 m	MPC · JPL
537180	2015 HY_{144}	—	March 3, 2010	WISE	WISE	·	1.0 km	MPC · JPL
537181	2015 HJ_{148}	—	October 24, 2008	Kitt Peak	Spacewatch	ADE	3.0 km	MPC · JPL
537182	2015 HU_{149}	—	March 28, 2010	WISE	WISE	·	2.0 km	MPC · JPL
537183	2015 HO_{150}	—	January 31, 2015	Haleakala	Pan-STARRS 1	·	2.0 km	MPC · JPL
537184	2015 HB_{151}	—	January 22, 2015	Haleakala	Pan-STARRS 1	·	1.4 km	MPC · JPL
537185	2015 HP_{152}	—	December 3, 2014	Haleakala	Pan-STARRS 1	(1547)	1.7 km	MPC · JPL
537186	2015 HX_{154}	—	March 13, 2010	Catalina	CSS	·	2.6 km	MPC · JPL
537187	2015 HF_{155}	—	April 1, 2011	Catalina	CSS	·	1.5 km	MPC · JPL
537188	2015 HX_{155}	—	April 1, 2015	Haleakala	Pan-STARRS 1	·	2.6 km	MPC · JPL
537189	2015 HO_{156}	—	April 16, 2007	Mount Lemmon	Mount Lemmon Survey	·	720 m	MPC · JPL
537190	2015 HY_{158}	—	September 14, 2007	Mount Lemmon	Mount Lemmon Survey	KOR	1.2 km	MPC · JPL
537191	2015 HE_{161}	—	January 23, 2014	Catalina	CSS	·	2.4 km	MPC · JPL
537192	2015 HK_{163}	—	January 28, 2014	Mount Lemmon	Mount Lemmon Survey	·	2.2 km	MPC · JPL
537193	2015 HL_{166}	—	August 17, 2009	La Sagra	OAM	3:2	5.7 km	MPC · JPL
537194	2015 HQ_{166}	—	March 12, 2010	Kitt Peak	Spacewatch	·	1.8 km	MPC · JPL
537195	2015 HU_{168}	—	April 21, 2006	Catalina	CSS	·	2.0 km	MPC · JPL
537196	2015 HC_{169}	—	September 11, 2007	Mount Lemmon	Mount Lemmon Survey	·	1.8 km	MPC · JPL
537197	2015 HK_{169}	—	February 28, 2010	WISE	WISE	·	2.1 km	MPC · JPL
537198	2015 HB_{171}	—	May 5, 2011	Mount Lemmon	Mount Lemmon Survey	·	900 m	MPC · JPL
537199	2015 HA_{172}	—	January 6, 2006	Catalina	CSS	ADE	2.7 km	MPC · JPL
537200	2015 HM_{172}	—	November 28, 2014	Mount Lemmon	Mount Lemmon Survey	(194)	1.7 km	MPC · JPL

== 537201–537300 ==
back to top

Designation			Discovery			Properties		Ref
Permanent	Provisional	Named after	Date	Site	Discoverer(s)	Category	Diam.	Ref
537201	2015 HU_{172}	—	January 25, 2015	Haleakala	Pan-STARRS 1	·	1.1 km	MPC · JPL
537202	2015 HU_{173}	—	September 12, 2007	Catalina	CSS	·	2.2 km	MPC · JPL
537203	2015 HB_{174}	—	January 28, 2015	Haleakala	Pan-STARRS 1	·	1.7 km	MPC · JPL
537204	2015 HF_{175}	—	November 17, 2007	Kitt Peak	Spacewatch	·	2.8 km	MPC · JPL
537205	2015 HX_{175}	—	January 28, 2015	Haleakala	Pan-STARRS 1	·	1.7 km	MPC · JPL
537206	2015 HL_{177}	—	November 8, 2013	Mount Lemmon	Mount Lemmon Survey	·	1.1 km	MPC · JPL
537207	2015 HY_{178}	—	October 13, 2007	Mount Lemmon	Mount Lemmon Survey	·	2.4 km	MPC · JPL
537208	2015 HL_{181}	—	December 30, 2005	Kitt Peak	Spacewatch	·	1.1 km	MPC · JPL
537209	2015 HP_{184}	—	October 11, 2004	Kitt Peak	Spacewatch	·	1.6 km	MPC · JPL
537210	2015 HK_{185}	—	December 19, 2004	Mount Lemmon	Mount Lemmon Survey	DOR	2.0 km	MPC · JPL
537211	2015 HS_{185}	—	January 7, 2006	Mount Lemmon	Mount Lemmon Survey	(5)	930 m	MPC · JPL
537212	2015 HX_{185}	—	April 23, 2015	Haleakala	Pan-STARRS 1	·	1.0 km	MPC · JPL
537213	2015 HY_{185}	—	April 23, 2015	Haleakala	Pan-STARRS 1	·	1.0 km	MPC · JPL
537214	2015 HA_{186}	—	April 25, 2015	Haleakala	Pan-STARRS 1	·	1.3 km	MPC · JPL
537215	2015 HB_{186}	—	December 22, 2012	Haleakala	Pan-STARRS 1	·	2.9 km	MPC · JPL
537216	2015 HE_{186}	—	November 15, 2012	Mount Lemmon	Mount Lemmon Survey	·	2.5 km	MPC · JPL
537217	2015 HF_{186}	—	March 11, 2014	Mount Lemmon	Mount Lemmon Survey	·	2.5 km	MPC · JPL
537218	2015 HG_{186}	—	April 8, 2010	WISE	WISE	·	2.7 km	MPC · JPL
537219	2015 HJ_{186}	—	September 10, 2007	Kitt Peak	Spacewatch	HOF	2.6 km	MPC · JPL
537220	2015 HM_{186}	—	September 4, 2011	Haleakala	Pan-STARRS 1	·	2.6 km	MPC · JPL
537221	2015 HN_{186}	—	April 18, 2015	Mount Lemmon	Mount Lemmon Survey	·	850 m	MPC · JPL
537222	2015 HO_{186}	—	October 11, 2012	Haleakala	Pan-STARRS 1	·	1.6 km	MPC · JPL
537223	2015 HS_{186}	—	October 16, 2012	Mount Lemmon	Mount Lemmon Survey	EOS	1.5 km	MPC · JPL
537224	2015 HT_{186}	—	December 4, 2007	Mount Lemmon	Mount Lemmon Survey	EOS	1.6 km	MPC · JPL
537225	2015 HU_{186}	—	April 25, 2015	Haleakala	Pan-STARRS 1	MAR	540 m	MPC · JPL
537226	2015 HY_{186}	—	August 31, 2005	Kitt Peak	Spacewatch	·	2.9 km	MPC · JPL
537227	2015 HE_{187}	—	May 3, 2010	WISE	WISE	·	3.8 km	MPC · JPL
537228	2015 HF_{187}	—	March 8, 2003	Palomar	NEAT	·	3.5 km	MPC · JPL
537229	2015 HM_{187}	—	April 17, 2015	Mount Lemmon	Mount Lemmon Survey	·	1.1 km	MPC · JPL
537230	2015 HO_{187}	—	April 18, 2015	Haleakala	Pan-STARRS 1	·	1.8 km	MPC · JPL
537231	2015 HR_{187}	—	January 2, 2009	Mount Lemmon	Mount Lemmon Survey	·	1.9 km	MPC · JPL
537232	2015 HT_{187}	—	August 9, 2005	Cerro Tololo	Deep Ecliptic Survey	·	2.6 km	MPC · JPL
537233	2015 HU_{187}	—	January 7, 2009	Kitt Peak	Spacewatch	·	3.4 km	MPC · JPL
537234	2015 HY_{187}	—	March 20, 2001	Kitt Peak	Spacewatch	·	2.0 km	MPC · JPL
537235	2015 HZ_{187}	—	October 25, 2012	Mount Lemmon	Mount Lemmon Survey	·	2.0 km	MPC · JPL
537236	2015 HA_{188}	—	October 4, 2008	Catalina	CSS	EUN	1.2 km	MPC · JPL
537237	2015 HB_{188}	—	March 15, 2010	Kitt Peak	Spacewatch	·	1.5 km	MPC · JPL
537238	2015 HF_{188}	—	September 19, 2012	Mount Lemmon	Mount Lemmon Survey	·	1.5 km	MPC · JPL
537239	2015 HG_{188}	—	August 4, 2003	Kitt Peak	Spacewatch	·	860 m	MPC · JPL
537240	2015 HL_{188}	—	April 29, 2011	Mount Lemmon	Mount Lemmon Survey	·	1.1 km	MPC · JPL
537241	2015 HQ_{188}	—	March 22, 2015	Haleakala	Pan-STARRS 1	·	1.6 km	MPC · JPL
537242	2015 HS_{188}	—	April 18, 2015	Haleakala	Pan-STARRS 1	·	980 m	MPC · JPL
537243	2015 HU_{188}	—	October 17, 2012	Mount Lemmon	Mount Lemmon Survey	·	1.3 km	MPC · JPL
537244	2015 HJ_{189}	—	March 22, 2015	Haleakala	Pan-STARRS 1	·	1.4 km	MPC · JPL
537245	2015 HU_{189}	—	December 11, 2013	Haleakala	Pan-STARRS 1	·	1.5 km	MPC · JPL
537246	2015 HD_{190}	—	April 24, 2006	Kitt Peak	Spacewatch	·	1.8 km	MPC · JPL
537247	2015 HK_{190}	—	January 28, 2015	Haleakala	Pan-STARRS 1	·	2.0 km	MPC · JPL
537248	2015 HL_{190}	—	January 28, 2015	Haleakala	Pan-STARRS 1	EUN	1.0 km	MPC · JPL
537249	2015 HM_{190}	—	March 22, 2015	Mount Lemmon	Mount Lemmon Survey	·	1.1 km	MPC · JPL
537250	2015 HP_{190}	—	November 1, 2008	Kitt Peak	Spacewatch	EUN	950 m	MPC · JPL
537251	2015 HR_{190}	—	October 17, 2012	Haleakala	Pan-STARRS 1	KOR	1 km	MPC · JPL
537252	2015 HS_{190}	—	December 10, 2013	Mount Lemmon	Mount Lemmon Survey	·	800 m	MPC · JPL
537253	2015 HE_{191}	—	December 3, 2005	Kitt Peak	Spacewatch	·	750 m	MPC · JPL
537254	2015 HM_{191}	—	April 18, 2015	Mount Lemmon	Mount Lemmon Survey	·	1.1 km	MPC · JPL
537255	2015 HT_{191}	—	April 23, 2015	Haleakala	Pan-STARRS 1	EOS	1.4 km	MPC · JPL
537256	2015 HV_{191}	—	April 23, 2015	Haleakala	Pan-STARRS 1	·	1.6 km	MPC · JPL
537257	2015 HD_{192}	—	April 23, 2015	Haleakala	Pan-STARRS 1	EOS	1.4 km	MPC · JPL
537258	2015 HR_{192}	—	January 11, 2014	Kitt Peak	Spacewatch	·	1.8 km	MPC · JPL
537259	2015 HC_{193}	—	April 25, 2015	Haleakala	Pan-STARRS 1	MAR	930 m	MPC · JPL
537260	2015 HL_{193}	—	October 31, 2013	Kitt Peak	Spacewatch	·	1.2 km	MPC · JPL
537261	2015 HX_{193}	—	May 23, 2011	Mount Lemmon	Mount Lemmon Survey	·	1.3 km	MPC · JPL
537262	2015 HN_{194}	—	January 28, 2014	Kitt Peak	Spacewatch	·	1.9 km	MPC · JPL
537263	2015 HP_{194}	—	March 25, 2014	Mount Lemmon	Mount Lemmon Survey	·	2.5 km	MPC · JPL
537264	2015 HU_{196}	—	January 15, 2009	Kitt Peak	Spacewatch	·	1.7 km	MPC · JPL
537265	2015 HV_{196}	—	March 4, 2010	WISE	WISE	T_{j} (2.98) · EUP	3.9 km	MPC · JPL
537266	2015 HW_{196}	—	September 30, 2006	Mount Lemmon	Mount Lemmon Survey	·	3.0 km	MPC · JPL
537267	2015 HY_{196}	—	April 25, 2015	Haleakala	Pan-STARRS 1	·	1.6 km	MPC · JPL
537268	2015 JA	—	March 9, 2011	Mount Lemmon	Mount Lemmon Survey	·	1.5 km	MPC · JPL
537269	2015 JJ_{3}	—	October 6, 2005	Mount Lemmon	Mount Lemmon Survey	·	1.5 km	MPC · JPL
537270	2015 JJ_{7}	—	March 18, 2015	Haleakala	Pan-STARRS 1	·	1.5 km	MPC · JPL
537271	2015 JC_{12}	—	October 7, 2010	Catalina	CSS	H	600 m	MPC · JPL
537272	2015 JN_{12}	—	May 12, 2015	Mount Lemmon	Mount Lemmon Survey	·	1.1 km	MPC · JPL
537273	2015 JS_{13}	—	October 15, 2012	Haleakala	Pan-STARRS 1	·	1.6 km	MPC · JPL
537274	2015 JW_{13}	—	December 30, 2013	Mount Lemmon	Mount Lemmon Survey	·	1.6 km	MPC · JPL
537275	2015 JX_{13}	—	May 21, 2011	Mount Lemmon	Mount Lemmon Survey	·	810 m	MPC · JPL
537276	2015 JY_{13}	—	October 10, 2008	Mount Lemmon	Mount Lemmon Survey	·	1.1 km	MPC · JPL
537277	2015 JA_{14}	—	March 21, 2009	Kitt Peak	Spacewatch	·	3.5 km	MPC · JPL
537278	2015 JB_{14}	—	February 27, 2009	Kitt Peak	Spacewatch	·	2.3 km	MPC · JPL
537279	2015 JP_{14}	—	December 11, 2013	Haleakala	Pan-STARRS 1	(5)	1.3 km	MPC · JPL
537280	2015 JB_{15}	—	November 14, 2012	Mount Lemmon	Mount Lemmon Survey	·	2.7 km	MPC · JPL
537281	2015 JS_{15}	—	January 2, 2014	Mount Lemmon	Mount Lemmon Survey	·	1.6 km	MPC · JPL
537282	2015 JA_{16}	—	May 15, 2015	Haleakala	Pan-STARRS 1	MAR	930 m	MPC · JPL
537283	2015 JE_{16}	—	May 15, 2015	Haleakala	Pan-STARRS 1	URS	3.5 km	MPC · JPL
537284	2015 KD	—	November 17, 2008	Kitt Peak	Spacewatch	H	470 m	MPC · JPL
537285	2015 KT	—	January 12, 2010	Catalina	CSS	(116763)	3.3 km	MPC · JPL
537286	2015 KQ_{1}	—	May 11, 2010	Mount Lemmon	Mount Lemmon Survey	·	2.4 km	MPC · JPL
537287	2015 KS_{1}	—	January 20, 2015	Haleakala	Pan-STARRS 1	·	1.7 km	MPC · JPL
537288	2015 KR_{2}	—	August 13, 2012	Kitt Peak	Spacewatch	·	1.5 km	MPC · JPL
537289	2015 KT_{2}	—	February 13, 2010	WISE	WISE	·	3.2 km	MPC · JPL
537290	2015 KX_{6}	—	March 28, 2015	Haleakala	Pan-STARRS 1	·	2.6 km	MPC · JPL
537291	2015 KA_{8}	—	March 19, 2010	Mount Lemmon	Mount Lemmon Survey	·	2.1 km	MPC · JPL
537292	2015 KS_{8}	—	June 5, 2011	Mount Lemmon	Mount Lemmon Survey	·	990 m	MPC · JPL
537293	2015 KB_{10}	—	September 10, 2007	Catalina	CSS	EUN	1.1 km	MPC · JPL
537294	2015 KD_{10}	—	December 31, 2013	Kitt Peak	Spacewatch	·	1.3 km	MPC · JPL
537295	2015 KT_{11}	—	June 26, 2010	WISE	WISE	·	2.3 km	MPC · JPL
537296	2015 KW_{12}	—	October 16, 2012	Mount Lemmon	Mount Lemmon Survey	MAR	830 m	MPC · JPL
537297	2015 KR_{13}	—	December 5, 2007	Kitt Peak	Spacewatch	·	2.9 km	MPC · JPL
537298	2015 KF_{15}	—	April 25, 2015	Haleakala	Pan-STARRS 1	ADE	1.4 km	MPC · JPL
537299	2015 KM_{15}	—	April 20, 2004	Kitt Peak	Spacewatch	·	2.6 km	MPC · JPL
537300	2015 KN_{16}	—	January 11, 2010	Kitt Peak	Spacewatch	·	1.1 km	MPC · JPL

== 537301–537400 ==
back to top

Designation			Discovery			Properties		Ref
Permanent	Provisional	Named after	Date	Site	Discoverer(s)	Category	Diam.	Ref
537301	2015 KR_{23}	—	April 30, 2011	Haleakala	Pan-STARRS 1	·	920 m	MPC · JPL
537302	2015 KE_{24}	—	January 26, 2014	Haleakala	Pan-STARRS 1	GEF	1.4 km	MPC · JPL
537303	2015 KV_{24}	—	March 28, 2015	Haleakala	Pan-STARRS 1	EOS	1.5 km	MPC · JPL
537304	2015 KC_{25}	—	January 20, 2015	Haleakala	Pan-STARRS 1	·	1.7 km	MPC · JPL
537305	2015 KM_{26}	—	October 22, 2012	Haleakala	Pan-STARRS 1	·	2.1 km	MPC · JPL
537306	2015 KC_{29}	—	March 30, 2015	Haleakala	Pan-STARRS 1	EUN	790 m	MPC · JPL
537307	2015 KD_{29}	—	August 23, 2011	Haleakala	Pan-STARRS 1	·	1.8 km	MPC · JPL
537308	2015 KK_{30}	—	November 2, 2007	Mount Lemmon	Mount Lemmon Survey	·	1.7 km	MPC · JPL
537309	2015 KB_{31}	—	September 28, 2003	Kitt Peak	Spacewatch	·	1.3 km	MPC · JPL
537310	2015 KJ_{32}	—	October 8, 2012	Haleakala	Pan-STARRS 1	EUP	3.0 km	MPC · JPL
537311	2015 KW_{34}	—	April 9, 2006	Mount Lemmon	Mount Lemmon Survey	·	1.5 km	MPC · JPL
537312	2015 KJ_{35}	—	May 12, 2015	Mount Lemmon	Mount Lemmon Survey	·	1.4 km	MPC · JPL
537313	2015 KH_{37}	—	December 31, 2013	Haleakala	Pan-STARRS 1	·	1.4 km	MPC · JPL
537314	2015 KO_{37}	—	March 2, 2006	Kitt Peak	Spacewatch	·	950 m	MPC · JPL
537315	2015 KX_{39}	—	December 6, 2012	Mount Lemmon	Mount Lemmon Survey	NAE	2.6 km	MPC · JPL
537316	2015 KD_{41}	—	March 21, 2015	Haleakala	Pan-STARRS 1	CYB	3.9 km	MPC · JPL
537317	2015 KV_{44}	—	September 28, 2008	Mount Lemmon	Mount Lemmon Survey	·	1.3 km	MPC · JPL
537318	2015 KQ_{45}	—	March 28, 2009	Catalina	CSS	·	3.3 km	MPC · JPL
537319	2015 KA_{46}	—	March 21, 2015	Haleakala	Pan-STARRS 1	·	1.3 km	MPC · JPL
537320	2015 KU_{48}	—	March 30, 2015	Haleakala	Pan-STARRS 1	·	2.7 km	MPC · JPL
537321	2015 KC_{51}	—	August 2, 2011	Haleakala	Pan-STARRS 1	·	1.7 km	MPC · JPL
537322	2015 KL_{55}	—	October 4, 1999	Kitt Peak	Spacewatch	·	1.5 km	MPC · JPL
537323	2015 KC_{58}	—	May 11, 1994	Kitt Peak	Spacewatch	·	1.2 km	MPC · JPL
537324	2015 KM_{59}	—	January 21, 2006	Kitt Peak	Spacewatch	·	930 m	MPC · JPL
537325	2015 KW_{59}	—	April 17, 2015	Mount Lemmon	Mount Lemmon Survey	·	1.2 km	MPC · JPL
537326	2015 KN_{63}	—	January 7, 2010	Mount Lemmon	Mount Lemmon Survey	·	1.2 km	MPC · JPL
537327	2015 KU_{64}	—	November 8, 2008	Mount Lemmon	Mount Lemmon Survey	(194)	1.2 km	MPC · JPL
537328	2015 KV_{69}	—	April 18, 2015	Kitt Peak	Spacewatch	·	1.5 km	MPC · JPL
537329	2015 KX_{74}	—	March 25, 2006	Kitt Peak	Spacewatch	·	1.3 km	MPC · JPL
537330	2015 KL_{75}	—	October 10, 2007	Mount Lemmon	Mount Lemmon Survey	·	1.0 km	MPC · JPL
537331	2015 KY_{76}	—	January 11, 1994	Kitt Peak	Spacewatch	CYB	3.3 km	MPC · JPL
537332	2015 KJ_{79}	—	March 24, 2015	Mount Lemmon	Mount Lemmon Survey	·	1.1 km	MPC · JPL
537333	2015 KS_{83}	—	April 18, 2015	Kitt Peak	Spacewatch	·	2.0 km	MPC · JPL
537334	2015 KP_{86}	—	January 22, 2015	Haleakala	Pan-STARRS 1	EUN	880 m	MPC · JPL
537335	2015 KG_{93}	—	October 12, 2007	Kitt Peak	Spacewatch	·	2.0 km	MPC · JPL
537336	2015 KO_{110}	—	March 19, 2010	Catalina	CSS	·	1.5 km	MPC · JPL
537337	2015 KJ_{111}	—	March 12, 2010	Kitt Peak	Spacewatch	·	1.8 km	MPC · JPL
537338	2015 KH_{112}	—	May 14, 2015	Haleakala	Pan-STARRS 1	·	1.8 km	MPC · JPL
537339	2015 KX_{113}	—	April 23, 2015	Haleakala	Pan-STARRS 1	VER	2.1 km	MPC · JPL
537340	2015 KD_{114}	—	October 20, 2011	Mount Lemmon	Mount Lemmon Survey	·	1.8 km	MPC · JPL
537341	2015 KF_{118}	—	October 10, 2007	Mount Lemmon	Mount Lemmon Survey	EUN	910 m	MPC · JPL
537342	2015 KN_{120}	—	May 22, 2015	Catalina	CSS	APO	290 m	MPC · JPL
537343	2015 KK_{125}	—	October 17, 2012	Haleakala	Pan-STARRS 1	·	1.7 km	MPC · JPL
537344	2015 KK_{129}	—	October 8, 2012	Kitt Peak	Spacewatch	·	1.1 km	MPC · JPL
537345	2015 KM_{130}	—	March 18, 2010	Kitt Peak	Spacewatch	·	1.5 km	MPC · JPL
537346	2015 KN_{130}	—	June 7, 2011	Mount Lemmon	Mount Lemmon Survey	·	800 m	MPC · JPL
537347	2015 KK_{132}	—	June 27, 2010	WISE	WISE	(22805)	3.6 km	MPC · JPL
537348	2015 KC_{133}	—	September 11, 2007	Catalina	CSS	·	1.9 km	MPC · JPL
537349	2015 KM_{135}	—	November 27, 2013	Haleakala	Pan-STARRS 1	·	1.1 km	MPC · JPL
537350	2015 KM_{141}	—	March 21, 2015	Haleakala	Pan-STARRS 1	·	1.1 km	MPC · JPL
537351	2015 KW_{141}	—	May 13, 2015	Mount Lemmon	Mount Lemmon Survey	EOS	1.6 km	MPC · JPL
537352	2015 KF_{146}	—	December 5, 2012	Mount Lemmon	Mount Lemmon Survey	·	1.3 km	MPC · JPL
537353	2015 KD_{147}	—	April 2, 2006	Catalina	CSS	·	2.7 km	MPC · JPL
537354	2015 KF_{156}	—	February 27, 2012	Haleakala	Pan-STARRS 1	H	420 m	MPC · JPL
537355	2015 KN_{163}	—	November 16, 2010	Mount Lemmon	Mount Lemmon Survey	H	600 m	MPC · JPL
537356	2015 KP_{163}	—	October 17, 2010	Mount Lemmon	Mount Lemmon Survey	3:2	5.1 km	MPC · JPL
537357	2015 KF_{165}	—	March 15, 2009	Mount Lemmon	Mount Lemmon Survey	KOR	1.2 km	MPC · JPL
537358	2015 KQ_{165}	—	November 27, 2013	Haleakala	Pan-STARRS 1	JUN	760 m	MPC · JPL
537359	2015 KV_{165}	—	February 24, 2014	Haleakala	Pan-STARRS 1	EOS	1.6 km	MPC · JPL
537360	2015 KX_{165}	—	September 24, 2011	Haleakala	Pan-STARRS 1	·	2.5 km	MPC · JPL
537361	2015 KC_{166}	—	December 23, 2012	Haleakala	Pan-STARRS 1	·	2.9 km	MPC · JPL
537362	2015 KD_{166}	—	September 26, 2011	Mount Lemmon	Mount Lemmon Survey	EOS	1.7 km	MPC · JPL
537363	2015 KT_{166}	—	May 21, 2015	Haleakala	Pan-STARRS 1	ADE	1.6 km	MPC · JPL
537364	2015 KX_{166}	—	May 21, 2015	Haleakala	Pan-STARRS 1	·	1.5 km	MPC · JPL
537365	2015 KD_{167}	—	December 17, 2007	Kitt Peak	Spacewatch	EOS	1.6 km	MPC · JPL
537366	2015 KE_{167}	—	September 27, 2011	Mount Lemmon	Mount Lemmon Survey	·	2.5 km	MPC · JPL
537367	2015 KF_{167}	—	November 7, 2012	Mount Lemmon	Mount Lemmon Survey	·	1.3 km	MPC · JPL
537368	2015 KG_{167}	—	February 11, 2008	Mount Lemmon	Mount Lemmon Survey	·	3.5 km	MPC · JPL
537369	2015 KT_{167}	—	November 2, 2008	Mount Lemmon	Mount Lemmon Survey	·	1.4 km	MPC · JPL
537370	2015 KY_{167}	—	November 4, 2012	Mount Lemmon	Mount Lemmon Survey	·	1.3 km	MPC · JPL
537371	2015 KA_{168}	—	January 16, 2008	Kitt Peak	Spacewatch	·	3.1 km	MPC · JPL
537372	2015 KF_{168}	—	May 21, 2015	Haleakala	Pan-STARRS 1	EOS	1.8 km	MPC · JPL
537373	2015 KG_{168}	—	August 30, 2000	Kitt Peak	Spacewatch	·	2.5 km	MPC · JPL
537374	2015 KM_{168}	—	November 19, 2008	Kitt Peak	Spacewatch	·	1.2 km	MPC · JPL
537375	2015 KN_{168}	—	January 17, 2013	Haleakala	Pan-STARRS 1	VER	2.6 km	MPC · JPL
537376	2015 KQ_{168}	—	May 11, 2015	Mount Lemmon	Mount Lemmon Survey	·	1.3 km	MPC · JPL
537377	2015 KX_{168}	—	May 18, 2015	Haleakala	Pan-STARRS 1	NAE	2.0 km	MPC · JPL
537378	2015 KW_{169}	—	January 3, 2014	Kitt Peak	Spacewatch	·	1.4 km	MPC · JPL
537379	2015 KN_{170}	—	May 21, 2015	Haleakala	Pan-STARRS 1	·	1.3 km	MPC · JPL
537380	2015 KZ_{170}	—	October 17, 2012	Haleakala	Pan-STARRS 1	·	1.4 km	MPC · JPL
537381	2015 KF_{171}	—	May 24, 2015	Haleakala	Pan-STARRS 1	·	1.2 km	MPC · JPL
537382	2015 KJ_{171}	—	December 22, 2005	Kitt Peak	Spacewatch	·	850 m	MPC · JPL
537383	2015 KR_{171}	—	May 25, 2015	Haleakala	Pan-STARRS 1	EOS	1.6 km	MPC · JPL
537384	2015 KV_{171}	—	May 25, 2015	Haleakala	Pan-STARRS 1	·	1.7 km	MPC · JPL
537385	2015 KC_{172}	—	May 26, 2015	Haleakala	Pan-STARRS 1	·	3.8 km	MPC · JPL
537386	2015 KN_{172}	—	May 25, 2015	Haleakala	Pan-STARRS 1	JUN	900 m	MPC · JPL
537387	2015 KO_{172}	—	December 31, 2008	Kitt Peak	Spacewatch	·	2.1 km	MPC · JPL
537388	2015 KP_{172}	—	November 11, 2006	Mount Lemmon	Mount Lemmon Survey	·	2.9 km	MPC · JPL
537389	2015 KT_{172}	—	December 11, 2012	Mount Lemmon	Mount Lemmon Survey	·	2.8 km	MPC · JPL
537390	2015 KV_{172}	—	May 21, 2015	Haleakala	Pan-STARRS 1	·	1.9 km	MPC · JPL
537391	2015 KX_{172}	—	May 21, 2015	Haleakala	Pan-STARRS 1	·	2.5 km	MPC · JPL
537392	2015 KY_{172}	—	May 24, 2015	Haleakala	Pan-STARRS 1	·	1.8 km	MPC · JPL
537393	2015 KA_{173}	—	May 29, 2015	Haleakala	Pan-STARRS 1	·	1.5 km	MPC · JPL
537394	2015 LP	—	July 28, 2011	Haleakala	Pan-STARRS 1	·	1.4 km	MPC · JPL
537395	2015 LG_{2}	—	June 5, 2015	Haleakala	Pan-STARRS 1	AMO · PHA	280 m	MPC · JPL
537396	2015 LK_{2}	—	December 28, 2013	Kitt Peak	Spacewatch	EUN	1.4 km	MPC · JPL
537397	2015 LL_{3}	—	August 26, 2011	Haleakala	Pan-STARRS 1	·	2.5 km	MPC · JPL
537398	2015 LZ_{6}	—	April 24, 2012	Haleakala	Pan-STARRS 1	H	480 m	MPC · JPL
537399	2015 LP_{7}	—	December 24, 2013	Mount Lemmon	Mount Lemmon Survey	EUN	1.2 km	MPC · JPL
537400	2015 LH_{11}	—	December 13, 2013	Mount Lemmon	Mount Lemmon Survey	H	440 m	MPC · JPL

== 537401–537500 ==
back to top

Designation			Discovery			Properties		Ref
Permanent	Provisional	Named after	Date	Site	Discoverer(s)	Category	Diam.	Ref
537401	2015 LG_{12}	—	January 23, 2006	Kitt Peak	Spacewatch	·	1.3 km	MPC · JPL
537402	2015 LU_{12}	—	September 20, 2003	Kitt Peak	Spacewatch	·	1.1 km	MPC · JPL
537403	2015 LD_{13}	—	May 2, 2006	Kitt Peak	Spacewatch	·	1.4 km	MPC · JPL
537404	2015 LM_{13}	—	May 5, 2006	Mount Lemmon	Mount Lemmon Survey	JUN	770 m	MPC · JPL
537405	2015 LC_{14}	—	February 25, 2006	Kitt Peak	Spacewatch	·	1.6 km	MPC · JPL
537406	2015 LU_{20}	—	February 27, 2014	Mount Lemmon	Mount Lemmon Survey	TIN	780 m	MPC · JPL
537407	2015 LJ_{23}	—	February 27, 2015	Haleakala	Pan-STARRS 1	·	2.8 km	MPC · JPL
537408	2015 LV_{23}	—	February 19, 2010	Catalina	CSS	·	2.3 km	MPC · JPL
537409	2015 LL_{25}	—	September 8, 2011	Haleakala	Pan-STARRS 1	·	2.2 km	MPC · JPL
537410	2015 LX_{26}	—	May 4, 2009	Mount Lemmon	Mount Lemmon Survey	·	2.1 km	MPC · JPL
537411	2015 LT_{27}	—	April 17, 2010	Kitt Peak	Spacewatch	·	2.2 km	MPC · JPL
537412	2015 LA_{30}	—	November 27, 2013	Haleakala	Pan-STARRS 1	H	410 m	MPC · JPL
537413	2015 LH_{31}	—	October 25, 2011	Haleakala	Pan-STARRS 1	·	3.1 km	MPC · JPL
537414	2015 LL_{32}	—	September 27, 2011	Mount Lemmon	Mount Lemmon Survey	GEF	1.0 km	MPC · JPL
537415	2015 LL_{35}	—	December 22, 2005	Kitt Peak	Spacewatch	·	1.2 km	MPC · JPL
537416	2015 LB_{36}	—	October 22, 2005	Palomar	NEAT	H	550 m	MPC · JPL
537417	2015 LT_{36}	—	July 10, 2007	Siding Spring	SSS	·	1.2 km	MPC · JPL
537418	2015 LZ_{37}	—	April 25, 2006	Kitt Peak	Spacewatch	MRX	790 m	MPC · JPL
537419	2015 LE_{38}	—	April 18, 2015	Haleakala	Pan-STARRS 1	(194)	1.7 km	MPC · JPL
537420	2015 LP_{40}	—	October 20, 2012	Haleakala	Pan-STARRS 1	·	2.1 km	MPC · JPL
537421	2015 LA_{41}	—	June 10, 2012	Mount Lemmon	Mount Lemmon Survey	H	550 m	MPC · JPL
537422	2015 LZ_{41}	—	March 12, 2008	Kitt Peak	Spacewatch	·	2.9 km	MPC · JPL
537423	2015 LE_{42}	—	October 14, 2007	Mount Lemmon	Mount Lemmon Survey	·	1.6 km	MPC · JPL
537424	2015 LF_{42}	—	June 13, 2015	Haleakala	Pan-STARRS 1	·	1.6 km	MPC · JPL
537425	2015 LO_{42}	—	September 26, 2011	Haleakala	Pan-STARRS 1	·	2.7 km	MPC · JPL
537426	2015 LP_{42}	—	January 10, 2008	Mount Lemmon	Mount Lemmon Survey	·	4.1 km	MPC · JPL
537427	2015 LQ_{42}	—	September 11, 2010	Catalina	CSS	·	3.2 km	MPC · JPL
537428	2015 LR_{42}	—	April 4, 2014	XuYi	PMO NEO Survey Program	·	3.2 km	MPC · JPL
537429	2015 LY_{42}	—	June 20, 2010	Mount Lemmon	Mount Lemmon Survey	·	2.5 km	MPC · JPL
537430	2015 LA_{43}	—	June 13, 2015	Haleakala	Pan-STARRS 1	EOS	2.2 km	MPC · JPL
537431	2015 LC_{43}	—	August 29, 2006	Kitt Peak	Spacewatch	AGN	1.3 km	MPC · JPL
537432	2015 LE_{43}	—	June 10, 2015	Haleakala	Pan-STARRS 1	EUN	1.1 km	MPC · JPL
537433	2015 LG_{43}	—	March 5, 2006	Kitt Peak	Spacewatch	(5)	1.1 km	MPC · JPL
537434	2015 LJ_{43}	—	February 15, 2013	Haleakala	Pan-STARRS 1	·	2.6 km	MPC · JPL
537435	2015 LQ_{43}	—	June 7, 2015	Mount Lemmon	Mount Lemmon Survey	·	1.0 km	MPC · JPL
537436	2015 LT_{44}	—	March 19, 2009	Mount Lemmon	Mount Lemmon Survey	BRA	1.2 km	MPC · JPL
537437	2015 LA_{45}	—	February 14, 2013	Kitt Peak	Spacewatch	·	2.8 km	MPC · JPL
537438	2015 LB_{45}	—	December 23, 2012	Haleakala	Pan-STARRS 1	·	3.0 km	MPC · JPL
537439	2015 LO_{45}	—	June 15, 2015	Mount Lemmon	Mount Lemmon Survey	·	2.3 km	MPC · JPL
537440	2015 LC_{46}	—	October 25, 2011	Haleakala	Pan-STARRS 1	·	1.8 km	MPC · JPL
537441	2015 LE_{46}	—	December 23, 2012	Haleakala	Pan-STARRS 1	·	1.5 km	MPC · JPL
537442	2015 LK_{46}	—	November 27, 2013	Haleakala	Pan-STARRS 1	·	1.4 km	MPC · JPL
537443	2015 LM_{46}	—	June 13, 2015	Haleakala	Pan-STARRS 1	KOR	1.1 km	MPC · JPL
537444	2015 LN_{46}	—	November 8, 2007	Kitt Peak	Spacewatch	·	1.7 km	MPC · JPL
537445	2015 MB	—	January 2, 2009	Mount Lemmon	Mount Lemmon Survey	·	1.4 km	MPC · JPL
537446	2015 MX	—	May 3, 2006	Mount Lemmon	Mount Lemmon Survey	EUN	1.1 km	MPC · JPL
537447	2015 ME_{3}	—	December 1, 2005	Socorro	LINEAR	·	3.7 km	MPC · JPL
537448	2015 MW_{5}	—	June 13, 2015	Mount Lemmon	Mount Lemmon Survey	BRA	1.4 km	MPC · JPL
537449	2015 MT_{6}	—	April 20, 2006	Kitt Peak	Spacewatch	·	1.2 km	MPC · JPL
537450	2015 MZ_{6}	—	December 14, 2001	Kitt Peak	Spacewatch	EUP	3.6 km	MPC · JPL
537451	2015 MK_{7}	—	June 15, 2010	WISE	WISE	·	2.2 km	MPC · JPL
537452	2015 MG_{8}	—	January 1, 2014	Kitt Peak	Spacewatch	JUN	730 m	MPC · JPL
537453	2015 ML_{8}	—	June 16, 2015	Haleakala	Pan-STARRS 1	·	2.8 km	MPC · JPL
537454	2015 MM_{9}	—	February 26, 2009	Kitt Peak	Spacewatch	·	1.6 km	MPC · JPL
537455	2015 MX_{9}	—	February 2, 2002	Cima Ekar	ADAS	TIR	2.8 km	MPC · JPL
537456	2015 MT_{10}	—	August 2, 2011	Haleakala	Pan-STARRS 1	·	790 m	MPC · JPL
537457	2015 MH_{14}	—	May 22, 2015	Haleakala	Pan-STARRS 1	H	410 m	MPC · JPL
537458	2015 MC_{18}	—	October 27, 2008	Mount Lemmon	Mount Lemmon Survey	·	2.3 km	MPC · JPL
537459	2015 MS_{18}	—	April 24, 2015	Haleakala	Pan-STARRS 1	·	1.6 km	MPC · JPL
537460	2015 MV_{23}	—	October 9, 2012	Mount Lemmon	Mount Lemmon Survey	·	960 m	MPC · JPL
537461	2015 MY_{26}	—	May 12, 2015	Mount Lemmon	Mount Lemmon Survey	·	2.0 km	MPC · JPL
537462	2015 MV_{27}	—	January 3, 2014	Mount Lemmon	Mount Lemmon Survey	·	2.3 km	MPC · JPL
537463	2015 MH_{38}	—	March 30, 2015	Haleakala	Pan-STARRS 1	·	1.5 km	MPC · JPL
537464	2015 MN_{50}	—	March 21, 2009	Kitt Peak	Spacewatch	·	1.8 km	MPC · JPL
537465	2015 MJ_{51}	—	July 7, 2010	WISE	WISE	·	3.6 km	MPC · JPL
537466	2015 MP_{53}	—	May 6, 2003	Kitt Peak	Spacewatch	·	2.6 km	MPC · JPL
537467	2015 ME_{54}	—	June 20, 2015	Haleakala	Pan-STARRS 1	AMO	300 m	MPC · JPL
537468	2015 ML_{55}	—	May 29, 2011	Mount Lemmon	Mount Lemmon Survey	·	1.4 km	MPC · JPL
537469	2015 MH_{58}	—	January 15, 2008	Kitt Peak	Spacewatch	·	2.7 km	MPC · JPL
537470	2015 ME_{59}	—	May 5, 2014	Haleakala	Pan-STARRS 1	·	3.4 km	MPC · JPL
537471	2015 MJ_{59}	—	June 27, 2010	WISE	WISE	T_{j} (2.99) · EUP	2.9 km	MPC · JPL
537472	2015 MN_{65}	—	November 3, 2007	Catalina	CSS	H	510 m	MPC · JPL
537473	2015 MJ_{66}	—	January 24, 2010	WISE	WISE	·	2.7 km	MPC · JPL
537474	2015 MN_{67}	—	July 25, 2010	WISE	WISE	·	4.2 km	MPC · JPL
537475	2015 ME_{72}	—	February 2, 2008	Kitt Peak	Spacewatch	·	2.6 km	MPC · JPL
537476	2015 MU_{75}	—	December 2, 2013	XuYi	PMO NEO Survey Program	H	520 m	MPC · JPL
537477	2015 MJ_{83}	—	June 13, 2010	Mount Lemmon	Mount Lemmon Survey	DOR	1.5 km	MPC · JPL
537478	2015 MT_{83}	—	April 22, 2014	Mount Lemmon	Mount Lemmon Survey	·	2.4 km	MPC · JPL
537479	2015 MB_{85}	—	March 25, 2010	Mount Lemmon	Mount Lemmon Survey	·	1.3 km	MPC · JPL
537480	2015 MU_{86}	—	February 2, 2008	Catalina	CSS	·	3.1 km	MPC · JPL
537481	2015 MB_{90}	—	February 24, 2006	Mount Lemmon	Mount Lemmon Survey	H	450 m	MPC · JPL
537482	2015 MH_{92}	—	March 22, 2015	Mount Lemmon	Mount Lemmon Survey	·	1.1 km	MPC · JPL
537483	2015 MP_{93}	—	August 29, 2005	Kitt Peak	Spacewatch	·	2.5 km	MPC · JPL
537484	2015 MA_{96}	—	January 31, 2009	Mount Lemmon	Mount Lemmon Survey	·	1.8 km	MPC · JPL
537485	2015 MS_{96}	—	July 8, 2010	Kitt Peak	Spacewatch	·	2.0 km	MPC · JPL
537486	2015 MS_{103}	—	April 7, 2014	Mount Lemmon	Mount Lemmon Survey	·	3.1 km	MPC · JPL
537487	2015 MH_{108}	—	December 21, 2012	Mount Lemmon	Mount Lemmon Survey	AST	1.6 km	MPC · JPL
537488	2015 MS_{110}	—	October 24, 2011	Haleakala	Pan-STARRS 1	·	1.6 km	MPC · JPL
537489	2015 MT_{110}	—	April 9, 2010	Kitt Peak	Spacewatch	·	1.4 km	MPC · JPL
537490	2015 MU_{114}	—	April 6, 2005	Kitt Peak	Spacewatch	·	1.7 km	MPC · JPL
537491	2015 MH_{117}	—	February 9, 2010	Mount Lemmon	Mount Lemmon Survey	·	910 m	MPC · JPL
537492	2015 MZ_{121}	—	December 27, 2011	Mount Lemmon	Mount Lemmon Survey	·	3.4 km	MPC · JPL
537493	2015 MA_{126}	—	May 22, 2010	WISE	WISE	·	2.9 km	MPC · JPL
537494	2015 MO_{126}	—	June 29, 2015	Haleakala	Pan-STARRS 1	·	2.4 km	MPC · JPL
537495	2015 MU_{127}	—	February 20, 2014	Haleakala	Pan-STARRS 1	·	1.9 km	MPC · JPL
537496	2015 MA_{128}	—	May 5, 2014	Haleakala	Pan-STARRS 1	·	3.2 km	MPC · JPL
537497	2015 MD_{130}	—	April 24, 2011	Haleakala	Pan-STARRS 1	·	1.2 km	MPC · JPL
537498	2015 MG_{131}	—	January 1, 2014	Haleakala	Pan-STARRS 1	H	340 m	MPC · JPL
537499	2015 MH_{131}	—	February 20, 2014	Mount Lemmon	Mount Lemmon Survey	·	1.1 km	MPC · JPL
537500	2015 ML_{131}	—	December 31, 2013	Kitt Peak	Spacewatch	H	390 m	MPC · JPL

== 537501–537600 ==
back to top

Designation			Discovery			Properties		Ref
Permanent	Provisional	Named after	Date	Site	Discoverer(s)	Category	Diam.	Ref
537501	2015 MM_{131}	—	June 30, 2015	Haleakala	Pan-STARRS 1	H	530 m	MPC · JPL
537502	2015 MU_{131}	—	March 2, 2009	Mount Lemmon	Mount Lemmon Survey	H	410 m	MPC · JPL
537503	2015 MJ_{133}	—	January 11, 2008	Kitt Peak	Spacewatch	·	4.0 km	MPC · JPL
537504	2015 MB_{134}	—	February 27, 2014	Haleakala	Pan-STARRS 1	AGN	950 m	MPC · JPL
537505	2015 MF_{134}	—	June 21, 2015	Mount Lemmon	Mount Lemmon Survey	EUN	1.1 km	MPC · JPL
537506	2015 MQ_{134}	—	June 20, 2015	Haleakala	Pan-STARRS 1	·	2.9 km	MPC · JPL
537507	2015 MH_{135}	—	September 30, 2011	Kitt Peak	Spacewatch	AEO	960 m	MPC · JPL
537508	2015 MM_{135}	—	January 24, 2012	Haleakala	Pan-STARRS 1	·	2.9 km	MPC · JPL
537509	2015 MP_{135}	—	November 6, 2010	Mount Lemmon	Mount Lemmon Survey	·	2.6 km	MPC · JPL
537510	2015 MN_{136}	—	April 7, 2006	Anderson Mesa	LONEOS	·	1.7 km	MPC · JPL
537511	2015 MZ_{136}	—	March 11, 2008	Mount Lemmon	Mount Lemmon Survey	EUP	3.4 km	MPC · JPL
537512	2015 MJ_{137}	—	June 9, 2010	WISE	WISE	·	2.8 km	MPC · JPL
537513	2015 MM_{137}	—	June 25, 2015	Haleakala	Pan-STARRS 1	·	3.6 km	MPC · JPL
537514	2015 MQ_{137}	—	October 21, 2011	Mount Lemmon	Mount Lemmon Survey	·	2.0 km	MPC · JPL
537515	2015 MU_{137}	—	March 10, 2014	Mount Lemmon	Mount Lemmon Survey	·	1.9 km	MPC · JPL
537516	2015 MK_{138}	—	October 27, 2000	Kitt Peak	Spacewatch	EOS	1.9 km	MPC · JPL
537517	2015 MR_{138}	—	January 2, 2012	Kitt Peak	Spacewatch	CYB	3.9 km	MPC · JPL
537518	2015 MA_{139}	—	February 28, 2008	Kitt Peak	Spacewatch	EOS	2.0 km	MPC · JPL
537519	2015 MU_{139}	—	June 17, 2015	Haleakala	Pan-STARRS 1	EOS	1.5 km	MPC · JPL
537520	2015 ML_{140}	—	March 12, 2014	Mount Lemmon	Mount Lemmon Survey	·	1.8 km	MPC · JPL
537521	2015 MM_{140}	—	September 23, 2005	Kitt Peak	Spacewatch	EOS	1.6 km	MPC · JPL
537522	2015 MV_{141}	—	June 19, 2015	Haleakala	Pan-STARRS 1	·	1.4 km	MPC · JPL
537523	2015 MU_{142}	—	October 26, 2011	Haleakala	Pan-STARRS 1	·	1.6 km	MPC · JPL
537524	2015 MX_{143}	—	November 26, 2012	Mount Lemmon	Mount Lemmon Survey	·	1.9 km	MPC · JPL
537525	2015 MP_{144}	—	October 29, 2010	Mount Lemmon	Mount Lemmon Survey	·	2.6 km	MPC · JPL
537526	2015 MT_{144}	—	January 3, 2012	Mount Lemmon	Mount Lemmon Survey	TIR	3.8 km	MPC · JPL
537527	2015 MH_{145}	—	June 22, 2015	Haleakala	Pan-STARRS 1	·	2.5 km	MPC · JPL
537528	2015 MB_{146}	—	August 13, 2010	Kitt Peak	Spacewatch	·	2.2 km	MPC · JPL
537529	2015 MJ_{147}	—	October 11, 2010	Kitt Peak	Spacewatch	·	2.3 km	MPC · JPL
537530	2015 MV_{147}	—	September 17, 2010	Kitt Peak	Spacewatch	·	2.3 km	MPC · JPL
537531	2015 MH_{149}	—	October 25, 2005	Kitt Peak	Spacewatch	·	2.2 km	MPC · JPL
537532	2015 ME_{150}	—	July 7, 2010	Kitt Peak	Spacewatch	EOS	2.0 km	MPC · JPL
537533	2015 NF_{2}	—	August 26, 2011	Haleakala	Pan-STARRS 1	·	1.2 km	MPC · JPL
537534	2015 NX_{2}	—	February 28, 2014	Haleakala	Pan-STARRS 1	·	1.7 km	MPC · JPL
537535	2015 NF_{7}	—	June 5, 2014	Mount Lemmon	Mount Lemmon Survey	·	2.2 km	MPC · JPL
537536	2015 NX_{7}	—	February 28, 2014	Haleakala	Pan-STARRS 1	·	1.7 km	MPC · JPL
537537	2015 NJ_{17}	—	April 29, 2014	Haleakala	Pan-STARRS 1	·	2.2 km	MPC · JPL
537538	2015 NE_{22}	—	October 10, 2007	Catalina	CSS	·	1.8 km	MPC · JPL
537539	2015 NO_{26}	—	May 9, 2014	Haleakala	Pan-STARRS 1	·	2.8 km	MPC · JPL
537540	2015 NL_{27}	—	May 4, 2014	Haleakala	Pan-STARRS 1	·	2.2 km	MPC · JPL
537541	2015 NS_{27}	—	August 10, 2004	Campo Imperatore	CINEOS	VER	2.4 km	MPC · JPL
537542	2015 NQ_{28}	—	April 16, 2010	WISE	WISE	·	3.2 km	MPC · JPL
537543	2015 NS_{28}	—	June 29, 2010	WISE	WISE	·	3.2 km	MPC · JPL
537544	2015 OP	—	June 26, 2015	Haleakala	Pan-STARRS 1	H	390 m	MPC · JPL
537545	2015 OT_{1}	—	June 13, 2015	Haleakala	Pan-STARRS 1	TIR	2.4 km	MPC · JPL
537546	2015 ON_{8}	—	March 15, 2010	Kitt Peak	Spacewatch	·	1.5 km	MPC · JPL
537547	2015 OP_{16}	—	April 1, 2003	Apache Point	SDSS	·	3.3 km	MPC · JPL
537548	2015 OQ_{24}	—	June 21, 2006	Palomar	NEAT	·	2.0 km	MPC · JPL
537549	2015 OW_{24}	—	July 25, 2006	Mount Lemmon	Mount Lemmon Survey	·	1.6 km	MPC · JPL
537550	2015 OQ_{26}	—	June 19, 2009	Mount Lemmon	Mount Lemmon Survey	H	620 m	MPC · JPL
537551	2015 OG_{35}	—	January 16, 2004	Kitt Peak	Spacewatch	H	520 m	MPC · JPL
537552	2015 OJ_{39}	—	January 10, 2013	Haleakala	Pan-STARRS 1	·	2.3 km	MPC · JPL
537553	2015 OZ_{40}	—	July 23, 2015	Haleakala	Pan-STARRS 1	·	870 m	MPC · JPL
537554	2015 OH_{44}	—	June 26, 2010	WISE	WISE	HYG	3.3 km	MPC · JPL
537555	2015 OT_{46}	—	April 5, 2014	Haleakala	Pan-STARRS 1	·	3.2 km	MPC · JPL
537556	2015 OB_{64}	—	July 23, 2010	WISE	WISE	·	3.2 km	MPC · JPL
537557	2015 OG_{65}	—	February 10, 2014	Haleakala	Pan-STARRS 1	·	2.6 km	MPC · JPL
537558	2015 OB_{67}	—	July 1, 2005	Kitt Peak	Spacewatch	·	810 m	MPC · JPL
537559	2015 OC_{68}	—	June 18, 2015	Haleakala	Pan-STARRS 1	·	1.6 km	MPC · JPL
537560	2015 OV_{74}	—	February 9, 2013	Haleakala	Pan-STARRS 1	·	1.6 km	MPC · JPL
537561	2015 OB_{76}	—	March 8, 2013	Haleakala	Pan-STARRS 1	·	3.0 km	MPC · JPL
537562	2015 OX_{77}	—	November 8, 2012	Socorro	LINEAR	·	1.3 km	MPC · JPL
537563	2015 OB_{78}	—	January 29, 1995	Kitt Peak	Spacewatch	H	420 m	MPC · JPL
537564	2015 OA_{80}	—	July 23, 2015	Haleakala	Pan-STARRS 1	H	520 m	MPC · JPL
537565	2015 OG_{80}	—	September 14, 2007	Mount Lemmon	Mount Lemmon Survey	H	440 m	MPC · JPL
537566	2015 OK_{80}	—	December 1, 2008	Mount Lemmon	Mount Lemmon Survey	H	310 m	MPC · JPL
537567	2015 OT_{80}	—	April 2, 2014	Mount Lemmon	Mount Lemmon Survey	H	430 m	MPC · JPL
537568	2015 OG_{81}	—	February 19, 2009	Kitt Peak	Spacewatch	H	400 m	MPC · JPL
537569	2015 OP_{85}	—	February 15, 2013	Haleakala	Pan-STARRS 1	·	1.5 km	MPC · JPL
537570	2015 OZ_{85}	—	October 10, 2010	Kitt Peak	Spacewatch	(159)	2.4 km	MPC · JPL
537571	2015 OA_{86}	—	December 13, 2006	Mount Lemmon	Mount Lemmon Survey	·	3.0 km	MPC · JPL
537572	2015 OQ_{86}	—	April 6, 2008	Kitt Peak	Spacewatch	·	3.1 km	MPC · JPL
537573	2015 OB_{87}	—	May 13, 2010	Mount Lemmon	Mount Lemmon Survey	·	1.8 km	MPC · JPL
537574	2015 OZ_{87}	—	October 13, 2010	Mount Lemmon	Mount Lemmon Survey	·	2.5 km	MPC · JPL
537575	2015 OT_{88}	—	April 29, 2014	Haleakala	Pan-STARRS 1	·	1.5 km	MPC · JPL
537576	2015 OA_{90}	—	May 6, 2014	Mount Lemmon	Mount Lemmon Survey	·	1.3 km	MPC · JPL
537577	2015 OK_{90}	—	February 27, 2007	Kitt Peak	Spacewatch	·	2.9 km	MPC · JPL
537578	2015 OA_{91}	—	February 15, 2013	Haleakala	Pan-STARRS 1	EOS	1.7 km	MPC · JPL
537579	2015 OE_{91}	—	March 31, 2008	Kitt Peak	Spacewatch	·	2.4 km	MPC · JPL
537580	2015 OC_{93}	—	March 28, 2014	Mount Lemmon	Mount Lemmon Survey	·	1.4 km	MPC · JPL
537581	2015 OQ_{94}	—	July 23, 2015	Haleakala	Pan-STARRS 1	·	2.5 km	MPC · JPL
537582	2015 OS_{94}	—	March 5, 2013	Haleakala	Pan-STARRS 1	·	2.5 km	MPC · JPL
537583	2015 OD_{97}	—	February 2, 2008	Kitt Peak	Spacewatch	·	2.4 km	MPC · JPL
537584	2015 OK_{97}	—	October 17, 2010	Mount Lemmon	Mount Lemmon Survey	VER	2.1 km	MPC · JPL
537585	2015 OA_{98}	—	March 1, 2008	Kitt Peak	Spacewatch	·	2.4 km	MPC · JPL
537586	2015 OC_{98}	—	April 10, 2014	Haleakala	Pan-STARRS 1	·	1.8 km	MPC · JPL
537587	2015 OL_{98}	—	November 4, 2010	Mount Lemmon	Mount Lemmon Survey	·	2.8 km	MPC · JPL
537588	2015 OO_{98}	—	April 4, 2014	Haleakala	Pan-STARRS 1	·	1.6 km	MPC · JPL
537589	2015 OX_{98}	—	January 20, 2013	Kitt Peak	Spacewatch	·	1.6 km	MPC · JPL
537590	2015 OA_{99}	—	February 17, 2013	Kitt Peak	Spacewatch	·	2.5 km	MPC · JPL
537591	2015 OQ_{99}	—	March 27, 2014	Haleakala	Pan-STARRS 1	·	1.6 km	MPC · JPL
537592	2015 OT_{101}	—	March 5, 2013	Mount Lemmon	Mount Lemmon Survey	·	2.7 km	MPC · JPL
537593	2015 OB_{103}	—	February 2, 2008	Kitt Peak	Spacewatch	EUP	2.8 km	MPC · JPL
537594	2015 OF_{103}	—	February 15, 2013	Haleakala	Pan-STARRS 1	EOS	1.6 km	MPC · JPL
537595	2015 OC_{104}	—	March 3, 2010	WISE	WISE	·	2.2 km	MPC · JPL
537596	2015 OP_{105}	—	November 6, 2005	Mount Lemmon	Mount Lemmon Survey	·	2.7 km	MPC · JPL
537597	2015 PE_{8}	—	March 6, 2013	Haleakala	Pan-STARRS 1	·	2.7 km	MPC · JPL
537598	2015 PE_{38}	—	April 2, 2014	Mount Lemmon	Mount Lemmon Survey	·	2.6 km	MPC · JPL
537599	2015 PR_{39}	—	February 14, 2013	Mount Lemmon	Mount Lemmon Survey	·	2.3 km	MPC · JPL
537600	2015 PY_{40}	—	June 27, 2010	WISE	WISE	·	2.4 km	MPC · JPL

== 537601–537700 ==
back to top

Designation			Discovery			Properties		Ref
Permanent	Provisional	Named after	Date	Site	Discoverer(s)	Category	Diam.	Ref
537601	2015 PL_{42}	—	February 26, 2014	Haleakala	Pan-STARRS 1	·	2.0 km	MPC · JPL
537602	2015 PD_{43}	—	November 20, 2006	Kitt Peak	Spacewatch	·	2.0 km	MPC · JPL
537603	2015 PM_{44}	—	April 29, 2014	Haleakala	Pan-STARRS 1	EOS	1.4 km	MPC · JPL
537604	2015 PQ_{49}	—	October 14, 2010	Mount Lemmon	Mount Lemmon Survey	·	2.3 km	MPC · JPL
537605	2015 PD_{58}	—	October 27, 2010	Dauban	C. Rinner, F. Kugel	·	2.0 km	MPC · JPL
537606	2015 PV_{81}	—	September 15, 2010	Mount Lemmon	Mount Lemmon Survey	·	2.6 km	MPC · JPL
537607	2015 PE_{120}	—	February 27, 2014	Mount Lemmon	Mount Lemmon Survey	DOR	1.6 km	MPC · JPL
537608	2015 PR_{135}	—	July 26, 1998	Kitt Peak	Spacewatch	·	3.4 km	MPC · JPL
537609	2015 PM_{221}	—	October 22, 2005	Kitt Peak	Spacewatch	·	2.4 km	MPC · JPL
537610	2015 PO_{222}	—	May 27, 2014	Haleakala	Pan-STARRS 1	LUT	3.7 km	MPC · JPL
537611	2015 PU_{242}	—	August 7, 2010	WISE	WISE	·	2.1 km	MPC · JPL
537612	2015 PG_{282}	—	November 6, 2010	Mount Lemmon	Mount Lemmon Survey	·	3.1 km	MPC · JPL
537613	2015 PM_{291}	—	September 18, 2010	Mount Lemmon	Mount Lemmon Survey	H	520 m	MPC · JPL
537614	2015 PD_{293}	—	October 7, 2004	Socorro	LINEAR	·	2.6 km	MPC · JPL
537615	2015 PK_{293}	—	January 19, 2013	Kitt Peak	Spacewatch	EUP	3.7 km	MPC · JPL
537616	2015 PK_{303}	—	October 12, 2005	Kitt Peak	Spacewatch	EOS	1.4 km	MPC · JPL
537617	2015 PR_{309}	—	August 6, 2010	WISE	WISE	·	3.0 km	MPC · JPL
537618	2015 PL_{310}	—	July 14, 2004	Siding Spring	SSS	·	2.7 km	MPC · JPL
537619	2015 PR_{312}	—	August 3, 2015	Haleakala	Pan-STARRS 1	H	550 m	MPC · JPL
537620	2015 PT_{312}	—	August 31, 2005	Kitt Peak	Spacewatch	H	370 m	MPC · JPL
537621	2015 PX_{314}	—	August 3, 2015	Haleakala	Pan-STARRS 1	·	1.8 km	MPC · JPL
537622	2015 PN_{315}	—	March 27, 2008	Mount Lemmon	Mount Lemmon Survey	EOS	1.3 km	MPC · JPL
537623	2015 PO_{315}	—	April 30, 2014	Haleakala	Pan-STARRS 1	EOS	1.5 km	MPC · JPL
537624	2015 PP_{315}	—	February 14, 2013	Kitt Peak	Spacewatch	·	2.6 km	MPC · JPL
537625	2015 PT_{315}	—	September 18, 2010	Mount Lemmon	Mount Lemmon Survey	·	3.1 km	MPC · JPL
537626	2015 PN_{316}	—	March 25, 2003	Kitt Peak	Spacewatch	KOR	1.4 km	MPC · JPL
537627	2015 PX_{316}	—	August 31, 2005	Kitt Peak	Spacewatch	·	1.6 km	MPC · JPL
537628	2015 PE_{318}	—	February 15, 2013	Haleakala	Pan-STARRS 1	·	2.5 km	MPC · JPL
537629	2015 PS_{321}	—	September 16, 2010	Mount Lemmon	Mount Lemmon Survey	·	2.4 km	MPC · JPL
537630	2015 QL	—	June 28, 2015	Haleakala	Pan-STARRS 1	·	2.6 km	MPC · JPL
537631	2015 QU_{2}	—	February 5, 2013	Mount Lemmon	Mount Lemmon Survey	TIR	2.6 km	MPC · JPL
537632	2015 QL_{3}	—	July 18, 2015	Haleakala	Pan-STARRS 1	H	530 m	MPC · JPL
537633	2015 QP_{10}	—	March 5, 2013	Haleakala	Pan-STARRS 1	·	2.1 km	MPC · JPL
537634	2015 QT_{13}	—	October 27, 2005	Mount Lemmon	Mount Lemmon Survey	·	1.9 km	MPC · JPL
537635	2015 QS_{14}	—	April 3, 2014	Haleakala	Pan-STARRS 1	·	2.9 km	MPC · JPL
537636	2015 QX_{15}	—	September 16, 2010	Mount Lemmon	Mount Lemmon Survey	·	2.1 km	MPC · JPL
537637	2015 QQ_{16}	—	October 29, 2010	Mount Lemmon	Mount Lemmon Survey	·	2.1 km	MPC · JPL
537638	2015 QH_{17}	—	February 10, 2014	Haleakala	Pan-STARRS 1	TIR	2.3 km	MPC · JPL
537639	2015 QX_{18}	—	August 21, 2015	Haleakala	Pan-STARRS 1	·	3.0 km	MPC · JPL
537640	2015 RR	—	October 17, 2010	Mount Lemmon	Mount Lemmon Survey	THM	2.2 km	MPC · JPL
537641	2015 RW_{1}	—	September 17, 2010	Socorro	LINEAR	H	510 m	MPC · JPL
537642	2015 RT_{4}	—	January 31, 1998	Caussols	ODAS	H	520 m	MPC · JPL
537643	2015 RF_{14}	—	January 9, 2013	Mount Lemmon	Mount Lemmon Survey	·	3.5 km	MPC · JPL
537644	2015 RR_{20}	—	January 17, 2013	Haleakala	Pan-STARRS 1	·	1.7 km	MPC · JPL
537645	2015 RJ_{26}	—	May 27, 2014	Haleakala	Pan-STARRS 1	·	2.6 km	MPC · JPL
537646	2015 RN_{38}	—	July 24, 2010	WISE	WISE	·	2.7 km	MPC · JPL
537647	2015 RT_{52}	—	March 13, 2007	Mount Lemmon	Mount Lemmon Survey	·	2.6 km	MPC · JPL
537648	2015 RL_{81}	—	September 15, 2009	Kitt Peak	Spacewatch	(45637) · CYB	2.5 km	MPC · JPL
537649	2015 RH_{84}	—	April 14, 2012	Haleakala	Pan-STARRS 1	H	480 m	MPC · JPL
537650	2015 RA_{88}	—	July 30, 2012	Haleakala	Pan-STARRS 1	H	540 m	MPC · JPL
537651	2015 RB_{95}	—	January 13, 2014	Mount Lemmon	Mount Lemmon Survey	H	410 m	MPC · JPL
537652	2015 RA_{101}	—	April 4, 2014	Mount Lemmon	Mount Lemmon Survey	·	1.6 km	MPC · JPL
537653	2015 RJ_{104}	—	September 13, 1998	Kitt Peak	Spacewatch	·	3.2 km	MPC · JPL
537654	2015 RD_{106}	—	November 4, 2005	Kitt Peak	Spacewatch	THM	2.1 km	MPC · JPL
537655	2015 RN_{117}	—	April 9, 2006	Mount Lemmon	Mount Lemmon Survey	H	540 m	MPC · JPL
537656	2015 RG_{121}	—	August 7, 2010	WISE	WISE	EUP	3.2 km	MPC · JPL
537657	2015 RZ_{144}	—	January 30, 2011	Catalina	CSS	·	1.2 km	MPC · JPL
537658	2015 RX_{150}	—	February 25, 2007	Mount Lemmon	Mount Lemmon Survey	EOS	1.8 km	MPC · JPL
537659	2015 RE_{207}	—	February 14, 2013	Kitt Peak	Spacewatch	·	2.5 km	MPC · JPL
537660	2015 RH_{235}	—	October 14, 2010	Mount Lemmon	Mount Lemmon Survey	H	440 m	MPC · JPL
537661	2015 RQ_{238}	—	August 20, 2009	Kitt Peak	Spacewatch	·	2.1 km	MPC · JPL
537662	2015 RO_{242}	—	August 19, 2009	La Sagra	OAM	·	2.6 km	MPC · JPL
537663	2015 RZ_{245}	—	March 19, 2009	Kitt Peak	Spacewatch	H	460 m	MPC · JPL
537664	2015 RA_{246}	—	September 6, 2015	Haleakala	Pan-STARRS 1	H	490 m	MPC · JPL
537665	2015 RB_{246}	—	April 29, 2014	Haleakala	Pan-STARRS 1	H	470 m	MPC · JPL
537666	2015 RR_{246}	—	March 24, 2014	Haleakala	Pan-STARRS 1	H	340 m	MPC · JPL
537667	2015 RS_{246}	—	April 17, 2009	Kitt Peak	Spacewatch	H	470 m	MPC · JPL
537668	2015 RV_{246}	—	September 12, 2015	Haleakala	Pan-STARRS 1	H	450 m	MPC · JPL
537669	2015 RJ_{254}	—	February 23, 2007	Mount Lemmon	Mount Lemmon Survey	·	2.7 km	MPC · JPL
537670	2015 RS_{256}	—	April 15, 2008	Mount Lemmon	Mount Lemmon Survey	·	2.0 km	MPC · JPL
537671	2015 RT_{256}	—	June 5, 2014	Haleakala	Pan-STARRS 1	·	2.3 km	MPC · JPL
537672	2015 RV_{256}	—	January 27, 2012	Mount Lemmon	Mount Lemmon Survey	·	3.3 km	MPC · JPL
537673	2015 RQ_{257}	—	March 15, 2008	Mount Lemmon	Mount Lemmon Survey	·	2.0 km	MPC · JPL
537674	2015 RU_{258}	—	September 11, 2004	Kitt Peak	Spacewatch	·	2.2 km	MPC · JPL
537675	2015 RB_{261}	—	January 18, 2012	Mount Lemmon	Mount Lemmon Survey	·	3.0 km	MPC · JPL
537676	2015 RE_{262}	—	April 30, 2014	Haleakala	Pan-STARRS 1	·	1.7 km	MPC · JPL
537677	2015 RJ_{263}	—	April 10, 2013	Haleakala	Pan-STARRS 1	·	3.4 km	MPC · JPL
537678	2015 RM_{263}	—	September 17, 2010	Mount Lemmon	Mount Lemmon Survey	·	2.6 km	MPC · JPL
537679	2015 RG_{264}	—	November 4, 2010	Mount Lemmon	Mount Lemmon Survey	VER	2.6 km	MPC · JPL
537680	2015 RO_{277}	—	September 5, 2015	Haleakala	Pan-STARRS 1	·	3.3 km	MPC · JPL
537681	2015 SF_{8}	—	April 28, 2008	Mount Lemmon	Mount Lemmon Survey	·	2.3 km	MPC · JPL
537682	2015 SQ_{9}	—	November 19, 2007	Mount Lemmon	Mount Lemmon Survey	H	410 m	MPC · JPL
537683	2015 SX_{11}	—	October 9, 2004	Kitt Peak	Spacewatch	·	2.9 km	MPC · JPL
537684	2015 SH_{12}	—	September 19, 2006	Catalina	CSS	·	2.1 km	MPC · JPL
537685	2015 SV_{16}	—	October 21, 2007	Catalina	CSS	H	670 m	MPC · JPL
537686	2015 SA_{17}	—	September 25, 2015	Catalina	CSS	AMO	580 m	MPC · JPL
537687	2015 SF_{18}	—	November 1, 2010	Kitt Peak	Spacewatch	·	2.4 km	MPC · JPL
537688	2015 SQ_{21}	—	August 22, 2015	Catalina	CSS	H	580 m	MPC · JPL
537689	2015 SS_{21}	—	October 27, 2012	Haleakala	Pan-STARRS 1	H	670 m	MPC · JPL
537690	2015 ST_{21}	—	September 19, 2015	Haleakala	Pan-STARRS 1	H	450 m	MPC · JPL
537691	2015 SW_{23}	—	February 1, 2012	Mount Lemmon	Mount Lemmon Survey	·	2.6 km	MPC · JPL
537692	2015 SJ_{25}	—	June 8, 2014	Haleakala	Pan-STARRS 1	·	740 m	MPC · JPL
537693	2015 SL_{25}	—	June 19, 2009	Kitt Peak	Spacewatch	·	2.7 km	MPC · JPL
537694	2015 SX_{25}	—	September 30, 2010	Mount Lemmon	Mount Lemmon Survey	·	2.1 km	MPC · JPL
537695	2015 SG_{27}	—	September 23, 2015	Haleakala	Pan-STARRS 1	VER	2.9 km	MPC · JPL
537696	2015 SW_{27}	—	May 16, 2008	Kitt Peak	Spacewatch	·	2.7 km	MPC · JPL
537697	2015 SP_{29}	—	November 6, 2005	Kitt Peak	Spacewatch	·	860 m	MPC · JPL
537698	2015 TW	—	February 16, 2012	Haleakala	Pan-STARRS 1	·	410 m	MPC · JPL
537699	2015 TC_{2}	—	October 12, 2010	Mount Lemmon	Mount Lemmon Survey	EOS	1.6 km	MPC · JPL
537700	2015 TT_{5}	—	January 21, 2014	Haleakala	Pan-STARRS 1	H	480 m	MPC · JPL

== 537701–537800 ==
back to top

Designation			Discovery			Properties		Ref
Permanent	Provisional	Named after	Date	Site	Discoverer(s)	Category	Diam.	Ref
537701	2015 TR_{20}	—	October 28, 2005	Catalina	CSS	H	540 m	MPC · JPL
537702	2015 TE_{21}	—	November 18, 2006	Mount Lemmon	Mount Lemmon Survey	·	1.1 km	MPC · JPL
537703	2015 TH_{21}	—	October 8, 2015	Haleakala	Pan-STARRS 1	·	1.1 km	MPC · JPL
537704	2015 TK_{49}	—	February 10, 2008	Mount Lemmon	Mount Lemmon Survey	·	2.8 km	MPC · JPL
537705	2015 TS_{82}	—	September 19, 2003	Kitt Peak	Spacewatch	THM	2.1 km	MPC · JPL
537706	2015 TM_{100}	—	December 1, 2006	Mount Lemmon	Mount Lemmon Survey	·	960 m	MPC · JPL
537707	2015 TX_{101}	—	August 24, 2008	Kitt Peak	Spacewatch	·	550 m	MPC · JPL
537708	2015 TX_{118}	—	May 17, 2014	Haleakala	Pan-STARRS 1	H	470 m	MPC · JPL
537709	2015 TV_{143}	—	October 11, 2015	Mount Lemmon	Mount Lemmon Survey	H	530 m	MPC · JPL
537710	2015 TF_{156}	—	May 20, 2010	WISE	WISE	·	1.5 km	MPC · JPL
537711	2015 TL_{169}	—	June 21, 2007	Mount Lemmon	Mount Lemmon Survey	·	1.3 km	MPC · JPL
537712	2015 TE_{178}	—	November 15, 2010	Mount Lemmon	Mount Lemmon Survey	H	560 m	MPC · JPL
537713	2015 TG_{179}	—	August 26, 2009	Catalina	CSS	·	2.8 km	MPC · JPL
537714	2015 TP_{183}	—	March 28, 2014	Mount Lemmon	Mount Lemmon Survey	H	370 m	MPC · JPL
537715	2015 TQ_{189}	—	September 13, 2015	Catalina	CSS	H	520 m	MPC · JPL
537716	2015 TL_{199}	—	November 25, 2006	Kitt Peak	Spacewatch	·	1.6 km	MPC · JPL
537717	2015 TS_{202}	—	March 8, 2014	Mount Lemmon	Mount Lemmon Survey	H	430 m	MPC · JPL
537718	2015 TY_{207}	—	January 20, 2009	Catalina	CSS	·	1.9 km	MPC · JPL
537719	2015 TJ_{216}	—	September 15, 2009	Kitt Peak	Spacewatch	·	3.1 km	MPC · JPL
537720	2015 TF_{222}	—	December 6, 2010	Mount Lemmon	Mount Lemmon Survey	·	2.2 km	MPC · JPL
537721	2015 TO_{234}	—	October 18, 1996	Xinglong	SCAP	·	770 m	MPC · JPL
537722	2015 TV_{236}	—	November 7, 2007	Kitt Peak	Spacewatch	H	680 m	MPC · JPL
537723	2015 TY_{239}	—	October 8, 2004	Socorro	LINEAR	H	480 m	MPC · JPL
537724	2015 TD_{242}	—	September 14, 1998	Kitt Peak	Spacewatch	·	2.7 km	MPC · JPL
537725	2015 TX_{243}	—	October 3, 1999	Socorro	LINEAR	·	520 m	MPC · JPL
537726	2015 TS_{251}	—	August 28, 2009	Catalina	CSS	·	2.5 km	MPC · JPL
537727	2015 TD_{255}	—	March 16, 2009	Kitt Peak	Spacewatch	H	420 m	MPC · JPL
537728	2015 TW_{259}	—	May 6, 2014	Mount Lemmon	Mount Lemmon Survey	H	500 m	MPC · JPL
537729	2015 TS_{260}	—	June 30, 2015	Haleakala	Pan-STARRS 1	·	1.4 km	MPC · JPL
537730	2015 TW_{285}	—	December 9, 2010	Mount Lemmon	Mount Lemmon Survey	H	520 m	MPC · JPL
537731	2015 TC_{287}	—	May 25, 2009	Kitt Peak	Spacewatch	H	480 m	MPC · JPL
537732	2015 TS_{287}	—	October 4, 2004	Kitt Peak	Spacewatch	VER	2.6 km	MPC · JPL
537733	2015 TX_{305}	—	September 18, 1999	Catalina	CSS	·	540 m	MPC · JPL
537734	2015 TS_{312}	—	December 15, 2010	Mount Lemmon	Mount Lemmon Survey	H	610 m	MPC · JPL
537735	2015 TF_{323}	—	June 19, 2009	Mount Lemmon	Mount Lemmon Survey	H	490 m	MPC · JPL
537736	2015 TH_{351}	—	August 7, 2012	Haleakala	Pan-STARRS 1	H	450 m	MPC · JPL
537737	2015 TO_{351}	—	October 10, 2015	Haleakala	Pan-STARRS 1	H	480 m	MPC · JPL
537738	2015 TE_{352}	—	September 10, 2015	Haleakala	Pan-STARRS 1	H	470 m	MPC · JPL
537739	2015 TV_{365}	—	April 3, 2008	Kitt Peak	Spacewatch	·	2.6 km	MPC · JPL
537740	2015 TP_{368}	—	April 21, 2009	Mount Lemmon	Mount Lemmon Survey	V	920 m	MPC · JPL
537741	2015 TG_{375}	—	March 8, 2013	Haleakala	Pan-STARRS 1	·	2.9 km	MPC · JPL
537742	2015 TT_{377}	—	March 29, 2008	Kitt Peak	Spacewatch	·	2.2 km	MPC · JPL
537743	2015 TD_{381}	—	April 26, 2008	Kitt Peak	Spacewatch	·	3.4 km	MPC · JPL
537744	2015 TD_{385}	—	May 24, 2014	Haleakala	Pan-STARRS 1	·	1.8 km	MPC · JPL
537745	2015 UH_{28}	—	October 19, 2010	Mount Lemmon	Mount Lemmon Survey	·	1.6 km	MPC · JPL
537746	2015 UC_{51}	—	October 18, 2015	Haleakala	Pan-STARRS 1	H	450 m	MPC · JPL
537747	2015 UJ_{54}	—	September 13, 2005	Kitt Peak	Spacewatch	·	520 m	MPC · JPL
537748	2015 UQ_{66}	—	October 17, 2007	Catalina	CSS	H	460 m	MPC · JPL
537749	2015 UW_{66}	—	June 12, 2012	Haleakala	Pan-STARRS 1	H	630 m	MPC · JPL
537750	2015 UE_{72}	—	October 7, 2004	Kitt Peak	Spacewatch	·	3.9 km	MPC · JPL
537751	2015 UJ_{84}	—	May 31, 2009	Mount Lemmon	Mount Lemmon Survey	H	470 m	MPC · JPL
537752	2015 UL_{84}	—	September 10, 2007	Mount Lemmon	Mount Lemmon Survey	H	430 m	MPC · JPL
537753	2015 UM_{84}	—	May 20, 2014	Haleakala	Pan-STARRS 1	H	400 m	MPC · JPL
537754	2015 UN_{84}	—	May 28, 2006	Kitt Peak	Spacewatch	H	530 m	MPC · JPL
537755	2015 UR_{84}	—	March 25, 2011	Kitt Peak	Spacewatch	H	450 m	MPC · JPL
537756	2015 UT_{84}	—	October 22, 2015	Haleakala	Pan-STARRS 1	H	430 m	MPC · JPL
537757	2015 UU_{84}	—	May 2, 2009	Kitt Peak	Spacewatch	H	440 m	MPC · JPL
537758	2015 UV_{84}	—	November 7, 2007	Kitt Peak	Spacewatch	H	550 m	MPC · JPL
537759	2015 UG_{85}	—	October 21, 2015	Haleakala	Pan-STARRS 1	H	450 m	MPC · JPL
537760	2015 UF_{90}	—	June 30, 2013	Haleakala	Pan-STARRS 1	·	1.9 km	MPC · JPL
537761	2015 VJ	—	October 21, 2007	Catalina	CSS	H	690 m	MPC · JPL
537762	2015 VQ	—	September 12, 2007	Siding Spring	SSS	H	520 m	MPC · JPL
537763	2015 VM_{2}	—	February 24, 2014	Haleakala	Pan-STARRS 1	H	370 m	MPC · JPL
537764	2015 VD_{3}	—	September 11, 2010	Mount Lemmon	Mount Lemmon Survey	H	620 m	MPC · JPL
537765	2015 VW_{31}	—	May 21, 2014	Haleakala	Pan-STARRS 1	·	580 m	MPC · JPL
537766	2015 VZ_{32}	—	March 14, 2004	Kitt Peak	Spacewatch	·	1.4 km	MPC · JPL
537767	2015 VH_{37}	—	October 7, 2004	Kitt Peak	Spacewatch	NYS	850 m	MPC · JPL
537768	2015 VS_{39}	—	October 8, 2015	Mount Lemmon	Mount Lemmon Survey	·	700 m	MPC · JPL
537769	2015 VH_{43}	—	January 22, 2006	Catalina	CSS	H	500 m	MPC · JPL
537770	2015 VZ_{58}	—	May 27, 2014	Haleakala	Pan-STARRS 1	·	3.4 km	MPC · JPL
537771	2015 VY_{64}	—	July 16, 2004	Socorro	LINEAR	·	880 m	MPC · JPL
537772	2015 VL_{65}	—	January 11, 2011	Kitt Peak	Spacewatch	H	440 m	MPC · JPL
537773	2015 VO_{65}	—	October 8, 2004	Socorro	LINEAR	H	570 m	MPC · JPL
537774	2015 VR_{67}	—	October 3, 2015	Catalina	CSS	H	480 m	MPC · JPL
537775	2015 VA_{96}	—	December 11, 2012	Mount Lemmon	Mount Lemmon Survey	·	890 m	MPC · JPL
537776	2015 VB_{96}	—	November 12, 1999	Kitt Peak	Spacewatch	·	600 m	MPC · JPL
537777	2015 VF_{107}	—	November 5, 2004	Anderson Mesa	LONEOS	H	450 m	MPC · JPL
537778	2015 VW_{107}	—	October 29, 2010	Kitt Peak	Spacewatch	H	380 m	MPC · JPL
537779	2015 VO_{108}	—	October 19, 2007	Catalina	CSS	H	510 m	MPC · JPL
537780	2015 VV_{112}	—	October 18, 2015	Haleakala	Pan-STARRS 1	·	1.2 km	MPC · JPL
537781	2015 VN_{113}	—	September 19, 2015	Haleakala	Pan-STARRS 1	PHO	1.8 km	MPC · JPL
537782	2015 VN_{121}	—	November 20, 2007	Catalina	CSS	H	490 m	MPC · JPL
537783	2015 VM_{123}	—	December 5, 2002	Socorro	LINEAR	H	550 m	MPC · JPL
537784	2015 VV_{125}	—	November 10, 2010	Kitt Peak	Spacewatch	H	510 m	MPC · JPL
537785	2015 VD_{127}	—	November 2, 2007	Kitt Peak	Spacewatch	H	550 m	MPC · JPL
537786	2015 VK_{130}	—	March 28, 2009	Kitt Peak	Spacewatch	H	470 m	MPC · JPL
537787	2015 VP_{131}	—	October 3, 2015	Catalina	CSS	H	480 m	MPC · JPL
537788	2015 VA_{134}	—	October 10, 2007	Catalina	CSS	·	1.6 km	MPC · JPL
537789	2015 VA_{135}	—	September 19, 2015	Haleakala	Pan-STARRS 1	·	600 m	MPC · JPL
537790	2015 VJ_{143}	—	August 16, 2009	Kitt Peak	Spacewatch	·	3.0 km	MPC · JPL
537791	2015 VM_{143}	—	April 22, 2011	Kitt Peak	Spacewatch	·	1.0 km	MPC · JPL
537792	2015 VX_{151}	—	April 29, 2006	Kitt Peak	Spacewatch	V	670 m	MPC · JPL
537793	2015 VB_{153}	—	August 23, 2004	Siding Spring	SSS	H	430 m	MPC · JPL
537794	2015 VG_{153}	—	November 2, 2015	Mount Lemmon	Mount Lemmon Survey	H	480 m	MPC · JPL
537795	2015 WL_{1}	—	November 18, 2015	Haleakala	Pan-STARRS 1	H	450 m	MPC · JPL
537796	2015 WK_{2}	—	September 12, 2007	Mount Lemmon	Mount Lemmon Survey	·	290 m	MPC · JPL
537797	2015 WR_{2}	—	May 1, 2009	Mount Lemmon	Mount Lemmon Survey	H	560 m	MPC · JPL
537798	2015 WH_{5}	—	April 30, 2014	Haleakala	Pan-STARRS 1	H	420 m	MPC · JPL
537799	2015 WF_{7}	—	February 13, 2010	Mount Lemmon	Mount Lemmon Survey	·	590 m	MPC · JPL
537800	2015 WN_{16}	—	March 10, 2014	Mount Lemmon	Mount Lemmon Survey	H	460 m	MPC · JPL

== 537801–537900 ==
back to top

Designation			Discovery			Properties		Ref
Permanent	Provisional	Named after	Date	Site	Discoverer(s)	Category	Diam.	Ref
537801	2015 WG_{18}	—	September 17, 2014	Haleakala	Pan-STARRS 1	·	1.5 km	MPC · JPL
537802	2015 WV_{20}	—	October 14, 2014	Mount Lemmon	Mount Lemmon Survey	·	1.6 km	MPC · JPL
537803	2015 WF_{22}	—	September 20, 2014	Catalina	CSS	HNS	1.4 km	MPC · JPL
537804	2015 XO_{1}	—	December 3, 2015	Haleakala	Pan-STARRS 1	H	430 m	MPC · JPL
537805	2015 XZ_{16}	—	October 19, 2006	Kitt Peak	Spacewatch	·	1.3 km	MPC · JPL
537806	2015 XQ_{37}	—	January 2, 2013	Mount Lemmon	Mount Lemmon Survey	·	620 m	MPC · JPL
537807	2015 XF_{62}	—	September 7, 1999	Socorro	LINEAR	·	790 m	MPC · JPL
537808	2015 XA_{72}	—	September 12, 2015	Haleakala	Pan-STARRS 1	H	470 m	MPC · JPL
537809	2015 XZ_{91}	—	September 23, 2008	Mount Lemmon	Mount Lemmon Survey	·	630 m	MPC · JPL
537810	2015 XN_{102}	—	October 3, 2008	Kitt Peak	Spacewatch	·	480 m	MPC · JPL
537811	2015 XT_{132}	—	November 5, 2007	Mount Lemmon	Mount Lemmon Survey	3:2	4.9 km	MPC · JPL
537812	2015 XJ_{145}	—	May 26, 2011	Mount Lemmon	Mount Lemmon Survey	·	920 m	MPC · JPL
537813	2015 XA_{178}	—	April 7, 2003	Kitt Peak	Spacewatch	·	1.0 km	MPC · JPL
537814	2015 XH_{180}	—	May 16, 2013	Haleakala	Pan-STARRS 1	(194)	1.9 km	MPC · JPL
537815	2015 XE_{212}	—	February 19, 2007	Mount Lemmon	Mount Lemmon Survey	·	620 m	MPC · JPL
537816	2015 XM_{228}	—	May 8, 2014	Haleakala	Pan-STARRS 1	·	590 m	MPC · JPL
537817	2015 XX_{245}	—	October 17, 2007	Mount Lemmon	Mount Lemmon Survey	·	1.3 km	MPC · JPL
537818	2015 XC_{246}	—	October 13, 2010	Catalina	CSS	·	1.6 km	MPC · JPL
537819	2015 XW_{302}	—	April 5, 2014	Haleakala	Pan-STARRS 1	·	790 m	MPC · JPL
537820	2015 XL_{307}	—	May 19, 2004	Kitt Peak	Spacewatch	·	640 m	MPC · JPL
537821	2015 XB_{333}	—	October 1, 2008	Mount Lemmon	Mount Lemmon Survey	·	580 m	MPC · JPL
537822	2015 XM_{333}	—	February 3, 2013	Haleakala	Pan-STARRS 1	·	870 m	MPC · JPL
537823	2015 XJ_{344}	—	April 11, 2003	Kitt Peak	Spacewatch	·	1.1 km	MPC · JPL
537824	2015 XS_{345}	—	November 18, 2008	Kitt Peak	Spacewatch	·	770 m	MPC · JPL
537825	2015 XB_{348}	—	January 1, 2009	Kitt Peak	Spacewatch	·	1.2 km	MPC · JPL
537826	2015 XC_{365}	—	November 21, 2008	Kitt Peak	Spacewatch	·	920 m	MPC · JPL
537827	2015 XP_{367}	—	December 22, 2008	Mount Lemmon	Mount Lemmon Survey	·	910 m	MPC · JPL
537828	2015 XN_{370}	—	July 26, 2010	WISE	WISE	·	2.2 km	MPC · JPL
537829	2015 XY_{378}	—	December 12, 2015	WISE	WISE	ATE	310 m	MPC · JPL
537830	2015 XS_{382}	—	November 30, 2008	Kitt Peak	Spacewatch	·	970 m	MPC · JPL
537831	2015 XP_{383}	—	January 18, 2013	Kitt Peak	Spacewatch	PHO	830 m	MPC · JPL
537832	2015 XE_{385}	—	December 16, 2007	Mount Lemmon	Mount Lemmon Survey	H	510 m	MPC · JPL
537833	2015 XF_{385}	—	February 13, 2008	Mount Lemmon	Mount Lemmon Survey	H	510 m	MPC · JPL
537834	2015 XO_{386}	—	January 10, 2014	Haleakala	Pan-STARRS 1	H	460 m	MPC · JPL
537835	2015 XY_{386}	—	April 15, 2011	Haleakala	Pan-STARRS 1	H	540 m	MPC · JPL
537836	2015 XS_{388}	—	December 29, 2012	Haleakala	Pan-STARRS 1	H	440 m	MPC · JPL
537837	2015 XF_{394}	—	September 13, 2007	Kitt Peak	Spacewatch	·	2.8 km	MPC · JPL
537838	2015 XY_{394}	—	April 20, 2007	Kitt Peak	Spacewatch	·	510 m	MPC · JPL
537839	2015 XO_{395}	—	August 13, 2013	Haleakala	Pan-STARRS 1	BRA	1.8 km	MPC · JPL
537840	2015 XC_{396}	—	November 27, 2014	Haleakala	Pan-STARRS 1	MAR	870 m	MPC · JPL
537841	2015 XD_{396}	—	October 2, 2006	Mount Lemmon	Mount Lemmon Survey	·	1.0 km	MPC · JPL
537842	2015 XH_{396}	—	December 16, 2006	Mount Lemmon	Mount Lemmon Survey	·	1.7 km	MPC · JPL
537843	2015 XQ_{396}	—	November 2, 2010	Mount Lemmon	Mount Lemmon Survey	·	1.3 km	MPC · JPL
537844	2015 XR_{396}	—	October 23, 2006	Mount Lemmon	Mount Lemmon Survey	HNS	1.4 km	MPC · JPL
537845	2015 XT_{396}	—	December 13, 2015	Haleakala	Pan-STARRS 1	·	1.2 km	MPC · JPL
537846	2015 XA_{397}	—	October 25, 2011	Kitt Peak	Spacewatch	·	1.1 km	MPC · JPL
537847	2015 XF_{397}	—	May 12, 2013	Mount Lemmon	Mount Lemmon Survey	V	480 m	MPC · JPL
537848	2015 XH_{397}	—	February 22, 2009	Kitt Peak	Spacewatch	PHO	890 m	MPC · JPL
537849	2015 XP_{397}	—	April 15, 2013	Haleakala	Pan-STARRS 1	V	580 m	MPC · JPL
537850	2015 XG_{400}	—	October 1, 2008	Mount Lemmon	Mount Lemmon Survey	·	2.7 km	MPC · JPL
537851	2015 XZ_{400}	—	November 22, 2014	Haleakala	Pan-STARRS 1	EUN	1.1 km	MPC · JPL
537852	2015 XD_{401}	—	October 23, 2009	Mount Lemmon	Mount Lemmon Survey	·	2.0 km	MPC · JPL
537853	2015 XG_{402}	—	November 25, 2005	Kitt Peak	Spacewatch	·	1.9 km	MPC · JPL
537854	2015 XM_{402}	—	September 21, 2009	Mount Lemmon	Mount Lemmon Survey	·	2.0 km	MPC · JPL
537855	2015 XO_{402}	—	May 21, 2012	Haleakala	Pan-STARRS 1	·	2.3 km	MPC · JPL
537856	2015 XQ_{402}	—	March 16, 2012	Haleakala	Pan-STARRS 1	·	1.1 km	MPC · JPL
537857	2015 XC_{404}	—	October 1, 2003	Kitt Peak	Spacewatch	·	2.7 km	MPC · JPL
537858	2015 XY_{404}	—	March 31, 2009	Kitt Peak	Spacewatch	·	1.1 km	MPC · JPL
537859	2015 XP_{407}	—	October 12, 2010	Mount Lemmon	Mount Lemmon Survey	·	1.3 km	MPC · JPL
537860	2015 XU_{408}	—	September 25, 2014	Mount Lemmon	Mount Lemmon Survey	EUN	1.0 km	MPC · JPL
537861	2015 XU_{409}	—	February 19, 2012	Kitt Peak	Spacewatch	·	2.0 km	MPC · JPL
537862	2015 XB_{410}	—	February 12, 2012	Catalina	CSS	·	1.4 km	MPC · JPL
537863	2015 XM_{412}	—	November 17, 2014	Haleakala	Pan-STARRS 1	·	3.2 km	MPC · JPL
537864	2015 XS_{414}	—	October 28, 2014	Mount Lemmon	Mount Lemmon Survey	·	1.8 km	MPC · JPL
537865	2015 XX_{414}	—	October 3, 2006	Kitt Peak	Spacewatch	·	820 m	MPC · JPL
537866	2015 XG_{415}	—	November 20, 2014	Mount Lemmon	Mount Lemmon Survey	·	1.9 km	MPC · JPL
537867	2015 XK_{415}	—	December 14, 2006	Kitt Peak	Spacewatch	·	1.5 km	MPC · JPL
537868	2015 XM_{415}	—	January 9, 2011	Mount Lemmon	Mount Lemmon Survey	·	2.3 km	MPC · JPL
537869	2015 XW_{415}	—	February 27, 2012	Haleakala	Pan-STARRS 1	·	1.4 km	MPC · JPL
537870	2015 XA_{416}	—	October 26, 2014	Catalina	CSS	·	1.7 km	MPC · JPL
537871	2015 XX_{416}	—	December 22, 2008	Kitt Peak	Spacewatch	·	1.0 km	MPC · JPL
537872	2015 XZ_{416}	—	October 10, 2008	Mount Lemmon	Mount Lemmon Survey	·	620 m	MPC · JPL
537873	2015 XP_{418}	—	March 13, 2012	Haleakala	Pan-STARRS 1	·	1.5 km	MPC · JPL
537874	2015 XN_{419}	—	August 27, 2013	Haleakala	Pan-STARRS 1	·	2.2 km	MPC · JPL
537875	2015 XR_{419}	—	December 13, 2010	Mount Lemmon	Mount Lemmon Survey	GEF	1.0 km	MPC · JPL
537876	2015 XY_{419}	—	July 5, 2014	Haleakala	Pan-STARRS 1	·	1.8 km	MPC · JPL
537877	2015 XG_{420}	—	September 10, 2013	Haleakala	Pan-STARRS 1	NAE	2.2 km	MPC · JPL
537878	2015 XS_{421}	—	November 18, 2011	Mount Lemmon	Mount Lemmon Survey	(194)	1.7 km	MPC · JPL
537879	2015 XU_{421}	—	December 8, 2015	Haleakala	Pan-STARRS 1	H	580 m	MPC · JPL
537880	2015 YH_{2}	—	December 9, 2001	Socorro	LINEAR	PHO	1.4 km	MPC · JPL
537881	2015 YA_{4}	—	November 4, 2007	Catalina	CSS	H	550 m	MPC · JPL
537882	2015 YM_{4}	—	April 21, 2009	Mount Lemmon	Mount Lemmon Survey	·	1.1 km	MPC · JPL
537883	2015 YQ_{6}	—	November 6, 2015	Mount Lemmon	Mount Lemmon Survey	·	830 m	MPC · JPL
537884	2015 YJ_{21}	—	February 29, 2008	XuYi	PMO NEO Survey Program	H	390 m	MPC · JPL
537885	2015 YX_{23}	—	December 18, 2015	Mount Lemmon	Mount Lemmon Survey	·	1.7 km	MPC · JPL
537886	2015 YH_{24}	—	August 28, 2014	Haleakala	Pan-STARRS 1	·	1.3 km	MPC · JPL
537887	2015 YO_{24}	—	December 30, 2011	Kitt Peak	Spacewatch	·	870 m	MPC · JPL
537888	2015 YR_{25}	—	November 20, 2008	Kitt Peak	Spacewatch	·	690 m	MPC · JPL
537889	2015 YJ_{26}	—	December 22, 2008	Kitt Peak	Spacewatch	·	690 m	MPC · JPL
537890	2015 YO_{27}	—	October 24, 2011	Mount Lemmon	Mount Lemmon Survey	·	1.6 km	MPC · JPL
537891	2016 AL_{6}	—	September 15, 2004	Kitt Peak	Spacewatch	KOR	1.6 km	MPC · JPL
537892	2016 AE_{8}	—	November 20, 2008	Mount Lemmon	Mount Lemmon Survey	·	660 m	MPC · JPL
537893	2016 AR_{9}	—	December 3, 2015	Haleakala	Pan-STARRS 1	H	510 m	MPC · JPL
537894	2016 AW_{22}	—	February 24, 2012	Haleakala	Pan-STARRS 1	·	2.9 km	MPC · JPL
537895	2016 AD_{24}	—	October 25, 2011	Haleakala	Pan-STARRS 1	V	630 m	MPC · JPL
537896	2016 AJ_{24}	—	August 17, 2009	Kitt Peak	Spacewatch	ADE	2.4 km	MPC · JPL
537897	2016 AX_{24}	—	October 25, 2008	Mount Lemmon	Mount Lemmon Survey	·	490 m	MPC · JPL
537898	2016 AK_{32}	—	October 17, 2010	Mount Lemmon	Mount Lemmon Survey	·	1.2 km	MPC · JPL
537899	2016 AR_{34}	—	November 25, 2006	Mount Lemmon	Mount Lemmon Survey	·	2.0 km	MPC · JPL
537900	2016 AB_{35}	—	October 22, 2005	Kitt Peak	Spacewatch	HOF	3.4 km	MPC · JPL

== 537901–538000 ==
back to top

Designation			Discovery			Properties		Ref
Permanent	Provisional	Named after	Date	Site	Discoverer(s)	Category	Diam.	Ref
537901	2016 AO_{36}	—	February 23, 2012	Catalina	CSS	·	1.3 km	MPC · JPL
537902	2016 AZ_{45}	—	March 23, 2006	Kitt Peak	Spacewatch	·	680 m	MPC · JPL
537903	2016 AJ_{51}	—	December 13, 1999	Kitt Peak	Spacewatch	·	630 m	MPC · JPL
537904	2016 AM_{53}	—	January 11, 1999	Kitt Peak	Spacewatch	·	550 m	MPC · JPL
537905	2016 AG_{54}	—	October 30, 2005	Kitt Peak	Spacewatch	·	2.4 km	MPC · JPL
537906	2016 AU_{64}	—	September 26, 2009	Catalina	CSS	H	590 m	MPC · JPL
537907	2016 AA_{67}	—	December 22, 2008	Mount Lemmon	Mount Lemmon Survey	·	780 m	MPC · JPL
537908	2016 AQ_{73}	—	December 16, 2006	Mount Lemmon	Mount Lemmon Survey	HNS	1.2 km	MPC · JPL
537909	2016 AF_{74}	—	February 8, 2008	Mount Lemmon	Mount Lemmon Survey	H	410 m	MPC · JPL
537910	2016 AV_{75}	—	November 22, 2000	Kitt Peak	Spacewatch	·	2.8 km	MPC · JPL
537911	2016 AY_{75}	—	November 5, 2010	Mount Lemmon	Mount Lemmon Survey	·	1.3 km	MPC · JPL
537912	2016 AU_{77}	—	December 12, 2004	Kitt Peak	Spacewatch	·	1.2 km	MPC · JPL
537913	2016 AW_{80}	—	December 28, 2005	Kitt Peak	Spacewatch	·	590 m	MPC · JPL
537914	2016 AL_{97}	—	January 23, 2006	Kitt Peak	Spacewatch	·	500 m	MPC · JPL
537915	2016 AF_{99}	—	October 11, 2007	Kitt Peak	Spacewatch	·	960 m	MPC · JPL
537916	2016 AN_{100}	—	November 21, 2005	Kitt Peak	Spacewatch	·	2.0 km	MPC · JPL
537917	2016 AP_{100}	—	February 21, 2007	Mount Lemmon	Mount Lemmon Survey	·	2.0 km	MPC · JPL
537918	2016 AX_{100}	—	December 2, 2008	Mount Lemmon	Mount Lemmon Survey	·	480 m	MPC · JPL
537919	2016 AZ_{102}	—	January 7, 2016	Haleakala	Pan-STARRS 1	·	800 m	MPC · JPL
537920	2016 AT_{103}	—	April 15, 2013	Haleakala	Pan-STARRS 1	V	560 m	MPC · JPL
537921	2016 AM_{104}	—	December 24, 2005	Kitt Peak	Spacewatch	·	460 m	MPC · JPL
537922	2016 AX_{104}	—	October 10, 2007	Catalina	CSS	·	1.1 km	MPC · JPL
537923	2016 AL_{106}	—	February 20, 2009	Kitt Peak	Spacewatch	V	550 m	MPC · JPL
537924	2016 AF_{108}	—	January 29, 2011	Mount Lemmon	Mount Lemmon Survey	·	2.2 km	MPC · JPL
537925	2016 AX_{108}	—	October 20, 2011	Mount Lemmon	Mount Lemmon Survey	V	600 m	MPC · JPL
537926	2016 AG_{109}	—	February 28, 2009	Kitt Peak	Spacewatch	·	910 m	MPC · JPL
537927	2016 AD_{114}	—	February 9, 2008	Kitt Peak	Spacewatch	·	1.2 km	MPC · JPL
537928	2016 AB_{117}	—	June 27, 2004	Kitt Peak	Spacewatch	MIS	2.9 km	MPC · JPL
537929	2016 AL_{120}	—	March 24, 2003	Kitt Peak	Spacewatch	MRX	1.2 km	MPC · JPL
537930	2016 AX_{120}	—	October 9, 2007	Mount Lemmon	Mount Lemmon Survey	·	1.0 km	MPC · JPL
537931	2016 AG_{121}	—	July 14, 2013	Haleakala	Pan-STARRS 1	·	2.0 km	MPC · JPL
537932	2016 AS_{123}	—	February 9, 2008	Mount Lemmon	Mount Lemmon Survey	·	1.2 km	MPC · JPL
537933	2016 AW_{123}	—	December 18, 2004	Mount Lemmon	Mount Lemmon Survey	V	750 m	MPC · JPL
537934	2016 AO_{125}	—	February 3, 2012	Haleakala	Pan-STARRS 1	·	890 m	MPC · JPL
537935	2016 AV_{126}	—	April 13, 2013	Haleakala	Pan-STARRS 1	·	550 m	MPC · JPL
537936	2016 AE_{128}	—	April 24, 2007	Kitt Peak	Spacewatch	·	2.1 km	MPC · JPL
537937	2016 AE_{132}	—	April 5, 2014	Haleakala	Pan-STARRS 1	H	360 m	MPC · JPL
537938	2016 AU_{140}	—	April 12, 2004	Siding Spring	SSS	·	1.9 km	MPC · JPL
537939	2016 AX_{140}	—	December 12, 2010	Kitt Peak	Spacewatch	·	1.7 km	MPC · JPL
537940	2016 AD_{142}	—	October 30, 2014	Mount Lemmon	Mount Lemmon Survey	·	1.3 km	MPC · JPL
537941	2016 AT_{142}	—	January 11, 2008	Kitt Peak	Spacewatch	PHO	1.1 km	MPC · JPL
537942	2016 AC_{164}	—	July 16, 2013	Haleakala	Pan-STARRS 1	·	1.8 km	MPC · JPL
537943	2016 AH_{166}	—	September 26, 2011	Haleakala	Pan-STARRS 1	·	610 m	MPC · JPL
537944	2016 AK_{172}	—	October 29, 2005	Catalina	CSS	·	570 m	MPC · JPL
537945	2016 AT_{175}	—	July 19, 2013	Haleakala	Pan-STARRS 1	EUN	980 m	MPC · JPL
537946	2016 AW_{176}	—	October 8, 2005	Catalina	CSS	·	1.8 km	MPC · JPL
537947	2016 AH_{179}	—	August 15, 2009	Catalina	CSS	·	1.7 km	MPC · JPL
537948	2016 AZ_{179}	—	August 26, 2013	Haleakala	Pan-STARRS 1	EUN	1.4 km	MPC · JPL
537949	2016 AU_{180}	—	October 11, 2010	Kitt Peak	Spacewatch	·	2.5 km	MPC · JPL
537950	2016 AO_{181}	—	December 13, 2004	Campo Imperatore	CINEOS	·	1.0 km	MPC · JPL
537951	2016 AM_{182}	—	November 15, 2006	Mount Lemmon	Mount Lemmon Survey	·	2.1 km	MPC · JPL
537952	2016 AB_{183}	—	January 8, 2016	Haleakala	Pan-STARRS 1	·	1.7 km	MPC · JPL
537953	2016 AD_{183}	—	January 8, 2016	Haleakala	Pan-STARRS 1	·	1.1 km	MPC · JPL
537954	2016 AX_{185}	—	August 30, 2005	Kitt Peak	Spacewatch	MAR	920 m	MPC · JPL
537955	2016 AN_{187}	—	January 15, 2005	Kitt Peak	Spacewatch	NYS	1.0 km	MPC · JPL
537956	2016 AM_{191}	—	September 23, 2011	Haleakala	Pan-STARRS 1	·	620 m	MPC · JPL
537957	2016 AD_{192}	—	January 19, 2008	Mount Lemmon	Mount Lemmon Survey	H	550 m	MPC · JPL
537958	2016 AH_{192}	—	October 14, 2009	Mount Lemmon	Mount Lemmon Survey	·	3.1 km	MPC · JPL
537959	2016 AL_{194}	—	June 8, 2014	Haleakala	Pan-STARRS 1	H	500 m	MPC · JPL
537960	2016 AQ_{194}	—	January 7, 2016	Haleakala	Pan-STARRS 1	H	490 m	MPC · JPL
537961	2016 AT_{194}	—	May 28, 2011	Kitt Peak	Spacewatch	H	500 m	MPC · JPL
537962	2016 AE_{195}	—	September 6, 2012	Haleakala	Pan-STARRS 1	H	420 m	MPC · JPL
537963	2016 AB_{196}	—	January 19, 2008	Mount Lemmon	Mount Lemmon Survey	H	480 m	MPC · JPL
537964	2016 AH_{208}	—	August 12, 2007	XuYi	PMO NEO Survey Program	·	2.5 km	MPC · JPL
537965	2016 AG_{216}	—	November 26, 2014	Haleakala	Pan-STARRS 1	·	1.8 km	MPC · JPL
537966	2016 AE_{217}	—	April 4, 2005	Catalina	CSS	MAS	850 m	MPC · JPL
537967	2016 AQ_{217}	—	December 19, 2004	Mount Lemmon	Mount Lemmon Survey	V	510 m	MPC · JPL
537968	2016 AT_{217}	—	December 18, 2004	Kitt Peak	Spacewatch	·	2.9 km	MPC · JPL
537969	2016 AX_{217}	—	May 15, 2012	Haleakala	Pan-STARRS 1	·	2.8 km	MPC · JPL
537970	2016 AY_{217}	—	November 17, 2014	Haleakala	Pan-STARRS 1	·	850 m	MPC · JPL
537971	2016 AB_{218}	—	May 12, 2013	Mount Lemmon	Mount Lemmon Survey	·	940 m	MPC · JPL
537972	2016 AD_{218}	—	January 2, 2012	Mount Lemmon	Mount Lemmon Survey	·	1.1 km	MPC · JPL
537973	2016 AD_{219}	—	September 23, 2014	Mount Lemmon	Mount Lemmon Survey	·	890 m	MPC · JPL
537974	2016 AQ_{219}	—	October 12, 2007	Mount Lemmon	Mount Lemmon Survey	·	960 m	MPC · JPL
537975	2016 AT_{219}	—	July 25, 2014	Haleakala	Pan-STARRS 1	·	460 m	MPC · JPL
537976	2016 AO_{220}	—	September 12, 2004	Kitt Peak	Spacewatch	·	2.0 km	MPC · JPL
537977	2016 AZ_{220}	—	December 27, 2006	Mount Lemmon	Mount Lemmon Survey	·	1.9 km	MPC · JPL
537978	2016 AH_{221}	—	March 20, 2012	Haleakala	Pan-STARRS 1	·	1.3 km	MPC · JPL
537979	2016 AJ_{221}	—	November 27, 2006	Mount Lemmon	Mount Lemmon Survey	·	2.1 km	MPC · JPL
537980	2016 AF_{222}	—	September 30, 2006	Mount Lemmon	Mount Lemmon Survey	·	1.1 km	MPC · JPL
537981	2016 AK_{222}	—	October 26, 2014	Mount Lemmon	Mount Lemmon Survey	·	1.6 km	MPC · JPL
537982	2016 AL_{223}	—	October 8, 2007	Mount Lemmon	Mount Lemmon Survey	·	1.1 km	MPC · JPL
537983	2016 AO_{223}	—	April 16, 2013	Haleakala	Pan-STARRS 1	V	530 m	MPC · JPL
537984	2016 AP_{223}	—	February 19, 2009	Kitt Peak	Spacewatch	·	1.1 km	MPC · JPL
537985	2016 AQ_{223}	—	March 31, 2009	Mount Lemmon	Mount Lemmon Survey	·	1.1 km	MPC · JPL
537986	2016 AY_{223}	—	February 28, 2009	Kitt Peak	Spacewatch	V	540 m	MPC · JPL
537987	2016 AE_{224}	—	September 10, 2007	Mount Lemmon	Mount Lemmon Survey	·	3.4 km	MPC · JPL
537988	2016 AN_{224}	—	January 9, 2016	Haleakala	Pan-STARRS 1	·	1.9 km	MPC · JPL
537989	2016 AO_{224}	—	May 28, 2008	Mount Lemmon	Mount Lemmon Survey	·	2.3 km	MPC · JPL
537990	2016 AQ_{224}	—	March 13, 2011	Mount Lemmon	Mount Lemmon Survey	·	3.4 km	MPC · JPL
537991	2016 AS_{224}	—	May 20, 2012	Mount Lemmon	Mount Lemmon Survey	·	3.6 km	MPC · JPL
537992	2016 AN_{225}	—	December 3, 2010	Mount Lemmon	Mount Lemmon Survey	·	1.5 km	MPC · JPL
537993	2016 AO_{225}	—	January 1, 2012	Mount Lemmon	Mount Lemmon Survey	·	1.3 km	MPC · JPL
537994	2016 AN_{226}	—	February 9, 2008	Mount Lemmon	Mount Lemmon Survey	·	1.2 km	MPC · JPL
537995	2016 AO_{226}	—	February 25, 2012	Mount Lemmon	Mount Lemmon Survey	EUN	1.1 km	MPC · JPL
537996	2016 AR_{226}	—	January 27, 2012	Mount Lemmon	Mount Lemmon Survey	·	960 m	MPC · JPL
537997	2016 AC_{227}	—	August 9, 2004	Siding Spring	SSS	JUN	1.1 km	MPC · JPL
537998	2016 AN_{227}	—	October 12, 2014	Mount Lemmon	Mount Lemmon Survey	·	1.2 km	MPC · JPL
537999	2016 AM_{228}	—	January 4, 2016	Haleakala	Pan-STARRS 1	·	2.9 km	MPC · JPL
538000	2016 AV_{231}	—	April 14, 2005	Kitt Peak	Spacewatch	·	1.4 km	MPC · JPL

back to top

== Meaning of names ==
As minor planet discoveries are confirmed, they are given a permanent number by the IAU's Minor Planet Center (MPC), and the discoverers can then submit names for them, following the IAU's naming conventions. The list below concerns those minor planets in the specified number-range that have received names, and explains the meanings of those names.

Official naming citations of newly named small Solar System bodies are approved and published in a bulletin by IAU's Working Group for Small Bodies Nomenclature (WGSBN). Before May 2021, citations were published in MPC's Minor Planet Circulars for many decades. Recent citations can also be found on the JPL Small-Body Database (SBDB). Until his death in 2016, German astronomer Lutz D. Schmadel compiled these citations into the Dictionary of Minor Planet Names (DMP) and regularly updated the collection.

Based on Paul Herget's The Names of the Minor Planets, Schmadel also researched the unclear origin of numerous asteroids, most of which had been named prior to World War II. This article incorporates text from this source, which is in the public domain: SBDB New namings may only be added to this list below after official publication as the preannouncement of names is condemned. The WGSBN publishes a comprehensive guideline for the naming rules of non-cometary small Solar System bodies.

Named minor planet	Provisional	This minor planet was named for...	Ref · Catalog
537170 Gerazhukov	2015 HU_{106}	Georgy Viktorovich Zhukov, known to his friends as Gera, Russian astronomer and associate professor at Kazan University.	IAU · 537170
