= List of minor planets: 503001–504000 =

The following is a partial list of minor planets, running from minor-planet number 503001 through 504000, inclusive. The primary data for this and other partial lists is based on JPL's "Small-Body Orbital Elements" and data available from the Minor Planet Center. Critical list information is also provided by the MPC, unless otherwise specified from Lowell Observatory. A detailed description of the table's columns and additional sources are given on the main page including a complete list of every page in this series, and a statistical break-up on the dynamical classification of minor planets.

Also see the summary list of all named bodies in numerical and alphabetical order, and the corresponding naming citations for the number range of this particular list. New namings may only be added to this list after official publication, as the preannouncement of names is condemned by the Working Group for Small Bodies Nomenclature of the International Astronomical Union.

Near-Earth obj.	MBA (inner)	MBA (outer)	Centaur
Mars-crosser	MBA (middle)	Jupiter trojan	Trans-Neptunian obj.
Unclassified

== 503001–503100 ==
Designation			Discovery			Properties		Ref
Permanent	Provisional	Named after	Date	Site	Discoverer(s)	Category	Diam.	Ref
503001	2015 FX_{96}	—	October 9, 2012	Haleakala	Pan-STARRS 1	·	2.5 km	MPC · JPL
503002	2015 FS_{98}	—	February 11, 2004	Kitt Peak	Spacewatch	·	2.2 km	MPC · JPL
503003	2015 FW_{99}	—	October 25, 2012	Mount Lemmon	Mount Lemmon Survey	VER	2.4 km	MPC · JPL
503004	2015 FV_{101}	—	December 11, 2004	Kitt Peak	Spacewatch	·	2.3 km	MPC · JPL
503005	2015 FK_{102}	—	January 17, 2010	Kitt Peak	Spacewatch	·	1.9 km	MPC · JPL
503006	2015 FT_{102}	—	December 21, 2008	Kitt Peak	Spacewatch	EOS	2.3 km	MPC · JPL
503007	2015 FX_{102}	—	January 15, 2004	Kitt Peak	Spacewatch	EOS	1.6 km	MPC · JPL
503008	2015 FD_{106}	—	September 10, 2007	Kitt Peak	Spacewatch	·	2.2 km	MPC · JPL
503009	2015 FN_{106}	—	November 8, 2007	Mount Lemmon	Mount Lemmon Survey	VER	3.3 km	MPC · JPL
503010	2015 FW_{108}	—	May 1, 2010	WISE	WISE	·	1.9 km	MPC · JPL
503011	2015 FG_{109}	—	September 15, 2007	Anderson Mesa	LONEOS	·	4.4 km	MPC · JPL
503012	2015 FK_{110}	—	March 16, 2007	Kitt Peak	Spacewatch	·	1.1 km	MPC · JPL
503013	2015 FL_{110}	—	October 23, 2012	Haleakala	Pan-STARRS 1	EUP	3.1 km	MPC · JPL
503014	2015 FW_{110}	—	August 10, 2007	Kitt Peak	Spacewatch	L4	8.5 km	MPC · JPL
503015	2015 FW_{111}	—	October 11, 2005	Kitt Peak	Spacewatch	·	970 m	MPC · JPL
503016	2015 FP_{112}	—	October 11, 2001	Kitt Peak	Spacewatch	EOS	2.1 km	MPC · JPL
503017	2015 FB_{113}	—	February 9, 2010	Kitt Peak	Spacewatch	TIN	1.2 km	MPC · JPL
503018	2015 FL_{115}	—	September 24, 1995	Kitt Peak	Spacewatch	EOS	1.9 km	MPC · JPL
503019	2015 FT_{115}	—	February 3, 2009	Mount Lemmon	Mount Lemmon Survey	·	3.6 km	MPC · JPL
503020	2015 FW_{116}	—	March 13, 2010	Kitt Peak	Spacewatch	·	2.6 km	MPC · JPL
503021	2015 FE_{121}	—	December 12, 2004	Kitt Peak	Spacewatch	·	2.8 km	MPC · JPL
503022	2015 FJ_{121}	—	March 12, 2010	Kitt Peak	Spacewatch	·	2.8 km	MPC · JPL
503023	2015 FM_{121}	—	November 2, 2013	Catalina	CSS	·	2.5 km	MPC · JPL
503024	2015 FB_{123}	—	March 24, 2006	Mount Lemmon	Mount Lemmon Survey	GEF	2.1 km	MPC · JPL
503025	2015 FY_{135}	—	December 29, 2013	Haleakala	Pan-STARRS 1	EOS	2.1 km	MPC · JPL
503026	2015 FL_{136}	—	February 5, 2009	Kitt Peak	Spacewatch	·	3.4 km	MPC · JPL
503027	2015 FG_{139}	—	March 1, 2009	Mount Lemmon	Mount Lemmon Survey	EOS	2.1 km	MPC · JPL
503028	2015 FF_{140}	—	April 6, 2000	Kitt Peak	Spacewatch	·	2.1 km	MPC · JPL
503029	2015 FT_{140}	—	September 19, 2006	Kitt Peak	Spacewatch	·	2.9 km	MPC · JPL
503030	2015 FM_{141}	—	October 30, 2002	Kitt Peak	Spacewatch	·	2.1 km	MPC · JPL
503031	2015 FV_{141}	—	January 20, 2009	Kitt Peak	Spacewatch	·	2.0 km	MPC · JPL
503032	2015 FK_{143}	—	March 13, 2010	Mount Lemmon	Mount Lemmon Survey	·	2.0 km	MPC · JPL
503033 New Hampshire	2015 FE_{144}	New Hampshire	March 3, 2005	Catalina	CSS	·	1.7 km	MPC · JPL
503034	2015 FN_{144}	—	November 4, 2007	Kitt Peak	Spacewatch	·	2.4 km	MPC · JPL
503035	2015 FX_{145}	—	February 16, 2010	WISE	WISE	·	1.4 km	MPC · JPL
503036	2015 FU_{146}	—	March 13, 2011	Mount Lemmon	Mount Lemmon Survey	·	1.1 km	MPC · JPL
503037	2015 FX_{146}	—	February 21, 2006	Catalina	CSS	·	1.9 km	MPC · JPL
503038	2015 FG_{149}	—	March 19, 2010	WISE	WISE	(194)	1.8 km	MPC · JPL
503039	2015 FR_{149}	—	September 28, 2006	Kitt Peak	Spacewatch	·	2.2 km	MPC · JPL
503040	2015 FR_{150}	—	October 5, 2005	Mount Lemmon	Mount Lemmon Survey	CYB	2.9 km	MPC · JPL
503041	2015 FW_{150}	—	April 1, 2005	Kitt Peak	Spacewatch	KOR	1.3 km	MPC · JPL
503042	2015 FJ_{151}	—	September 16, 2006	Kitt Peak	Spacewatch	ELF	3.1 km	MPC · JPL
503043	2015 FD_{152}	—	February 26, 2009	Kitt Peak	Spacewatch	HYG	2.9 km	MPC · JPL
503044	2015 FU_{152}	—	December 21, 2003	Kitt Peak	Spacewatch	·	1.7 km	MPC · JPL
503045	2015 FL_{153}	—	April 4, 2011	Kitt Peak	Spacewatch	·	1.0 km	MPC · JPL
503046	2015 FL_{158}	—	March 3, 2009	Catalina	CSS	·	3.7 km	MPC · JPL
503047	2015 FV_{158}	—	October 27, 2009	Mount Lemmon	Mount Lemmon Survey	·	3.3 km	MPC · JPL
503048	2015 FY_{158}	—	August 30, 2011	Haleakala	Pan-STARRS 1	·	2.5 km	MPC · JPL
503049	2015 FB_{159}	—	October 28, 2008	Kitt Peak	Spacewatch	·	1.7 km	MPC · JPL
503050	2015 FO_{161}	—	January 7, 2002	Kitt Peak	Spacewatch	·	940 m	MPC · JPL
503051	2015 FR_{162}	—	December 18, 2007	Mount Lemmon	Mount Lemmon Survey	·	3.3 km	MPC · JPL
503052	2015 FJ_{164}	—	November 10, 2004	Kitt Peak	Spacewatch	·	1.6 km	MPC · JPL
503053	2015 FS_{165}	—	October 2, 2006	Mount Lemmon	Mount Lemmon Survey	·	3.5 km	MPC · JPL
503054	2015 FH_{166}	—	October 15, 1995	Kitt Peak	Spacewatch	·	4.2 km	MPC · JPL
503055	2015 FB_{168}	—	October 13, 2007	Mount Lemmon	Mount Lemmon Survey	KOR	1.3 km	MPC · JPL
503056	2015 FM_{170}	—	October 31, 2007	Kitt Peak	Spacewatch	·	3.6 km	MPC · JPL
503057	2015 FE_{171}	—	April 20, 2006	Kitt Peak	Spacewatch	HOF	2.8 km	MPC · JPL
503058	2015 FC_{174}	—	March 13, 2010	WISE	WISE	·	2.3 km	MPC · JPL
503059	2015 FP_{174}	—	January 12, 2010	Mount Lemmon	Mount Lemmon Survey	·	2.2 km	MPC · JPL
503060	2015 FM_{177}	—	August 24, 2012	Kitt Peak	Spacewatch	·	2.8 km	MPC · JPL
503061	2015 FZ_{179}	—	September 27, 2003	Kitt Peak	Spacewatch	·	1.8 km	MPC · JPL
503062	2015 FZ_{195}	—	February 12, 2004	Kitt Peak	Spacewatch	·	3.2 km	MPC · JPL
503063	2015 FA_{196}	—	August 21, 2006	Kitt Peak	Spacewatch	VER	3.1 km	MPC · JPL
503064	2015 FT_{205}	—	December 25, 2009	Kitt Peak	Spacewatch	ADE	1.6 km	MPC · JPL
503065	2015 FU_{208}	—	October 30, 2007	Mount Lemmon	Mount Lemmon Survey	·	3.6 km	MPC · JPL
503066	2015 FU_{211}	—	December 19, 2003	Socorro	LINEAR	·	2.7 km	MPC · JPL
503067	2015 FV_{211}	—	October 6, 2008	Mount Lemmon	Mount Lemmon Survey	·	1.7 km	MPC · JPL
503068	2015 FW_{212}	—	March 16, 2010	Catalina	CSS	·	2.0 km	MPC · JPL
503069	2015 FG_{214}	—	November 17, 2007	Mount Lemmon	Mount Lemmon Survey	·	3.8 km	MPC · JPL
503070	2015 FX_{222}	—	October 20, 2007	Kitt Peak	Spacewatch	·	3.4 km	MPC · JPL
503071	2015 FO_{224}	—	September 24, 2008	Mount Lemmon	Mount Lemmon Survey	·	2.5 km	MPC · JPL
503072	2015 FR_{229}	—	April 25, 2004	Kitt Peak	Spacewatch	THM	2.5 km	MPC · JPL
503073	2015 FK_{237}	—	February 13, 2010	Mount Lemmon	Mount Lemmon Survey	·	1.9 km	MPC · JPL
503074	2015 FN_{247}	—	April 11, 2010	Mount Lemmon	Mount Lemmon Survey	·	3.8 km	MPC · JPL
503075	2015 FK_{251}	—	October 8, 2008	Kitt Peak	Spacewatch	AGN	1.5 km	MPC · JPL
503076	2015 FK_{253}	—	March 13, 2010	Mount Lemmon	Mount Lemmon Survey	·	2.3 km	MPC · JPL
503077	2015 FQ_{263}	—	December 18, 2009	Kitt Peak	Spacewatch	·	1.7 km	MPC · JPL
503078	2015 FY_{265}	—	January 7, 2010	Kitt Peak	Spacewatch	AGN	1.6 km	MPC · JPL
503079	2015 FO_{267}	—	December 22, 2008	Kitt Peak	Spacewatch	THM	2.1 km	MPC · JPL
503080	2015 FF_{268}	—	February 14, 2009	Mount Lemmon	Mount Lemmon Survey	·	2.8 km	MPC · JPL
503081	2015 FM_{279}	—	May 22, 2011	Mount Lemmon	Mount Lemmon Survey	·	2.5 km	MPC · JPL
503082	2015 FE_{280}	—	January 13, 2002	Socorro	LINEAR	·	1.9 km	MPC · JPL
503083	2015 FG_{284}	—	November 11, 2004	Catalina	CSS	JUN	1.3 km	MPC · JPL
503084	2015 FM_{284}	—	May 22, 2011	Mount Lemmon	Mount Lemmon Survey	·	1.7 km	MPC · JPL
503085	2015 FE_{290}	—	October 8, 2012	Mount Lemmon	Mount Lemmon Survey	·	2.7 km	MPC · JPL
503086	2015 FF_{290}	—	February 15, 2010	WISE	WISE	·	2.1 km	MPC · JPL
503087	2015 FT_{291}	—	April 25, 2007	Mount Lemmon	Mount Lemmon Survey	·	1.3 km	MPC · JPL
503088	2015 FN_{294}	—	January 28, 2015	Haleakala	Pan-STARRS 1	·	2.5 km	MPC · JPL
503089	2015 FP_{294}	—	February 10, 2014	Haleakala	Pan-STARRS 1	·	3.5 km	MPC · JPL
503090	2015 FZ_{295}	—	October 22, 2012	Mount Lemmon	Mount Lemmon Survey	·	2.8 km	MPC · JPL
503091	2015 FR_{296}	—	March 14, 2010	WISE	WISE	EOS	2.4 km	MPC · JPL
503092	2015 FA_{298}	—	March 27, 2004	Socorro	LINEAR	·	2.4 km	MPC · JPL
503093	2015 FV_{298}	—	December 22, 2008	Mount Lemmon	Mount Lemmon Survey	·	2.4 km	MPC · JPL
503094	2015 FT_{300}	—	May 12, 2007	Kitt Peak	Spacewatch	·	2.8 km	MPC · JPL
503095	2015 FN_{301}	—	February 2, 2009	Mount Lemmon	Mount Lemmon Survey	EOS	1.8 km	MPC · JPL
503096	2015 FF_{304}	—	November 19, 2008	Mount Lemmon	Mount Lemmon Survey	H	580 m	MPC · JPL
503097	2015 FJ_{306}	—	December 16, 2007	Mount Lemmon	Mount Lemmon Survey	EOS	2.2 km	MPC · JPL
503098	2015 FJ_{309}	—	February 2, 2006	Mount Lemmon	Mount Lemmon Survey	·	2.3 km	MPC · JPL
503099	2015 FE_{312}	—	January 22, 2006	Catalina	CSS	ADE	2.6 km	MPC · JPL
503100	2015 FG_{314}	—	January 29, 2009	Mount Lemmon	Mount Lemmon Survey	·	2.9 km	MPC · JPL

== 503101–503200 ==
back to top

Designation			Discovery			Properties		Ref
Permanent	Provisional	Named after	Date	Site	Discoverer(s)	Category	Diam.	Ref
503101	2015 FE_{315}	—	December 18, 2009	Kitt Peak	Spacewatch	·	1.4 km	MPC · JPL
503102	2015 FK_{315}	—	October 8, 2007	Kitt Peak	Spacewatch	·	2.8 km	MPC · JPL
503103	2015 FT_{315}	—	February 5, 2006	Mount Lemmon	Mount Lemmon Survey	·	1.5 km	MPC · JPL
503104	2015 FV_{315}	—	October 8, 2012	Haleakala	Pan-STARRS 1	·	2.9 km	MPC · JPL
503105	2015 FL_{316}	—	September 10, 2007	Kitt Peak	Spacewatch	·	2.7 km	MPC · JPL
503106	2015 FS_{316}	—	November 16, 2006	Mount Lemmon	Mount Lemmon Survey	·	3.2 km	MPC · JPL
503107	2015 FQ_{317}	—	February 2, 2006	Kitt Peak	Spacewatch	·	2.7 km	MPC · JPL
503108	2015 FN_{318}	—	July 1, 2011	Kitt Peak	Spacewatch	·	2.3 km	MPC · JPL
503109	2015 FA_{319}	—	January 17, 2009	Kitt Peak	Spacewatch	·	2.7 km	MPC · JPL
503110	2015 FJ_{319}	—	October 8, 2012	Haleakala	Pan-STARRS 1	EOS	1.9 km	MPC · JPL
503111	2015 FB_{320}	—	March 14, 2004	Kitt Peak	Spacewatch	·	2.5 km	MPC · JPL
503112	2015 FU_{320}	—	March 12, 2011	Mount Lemmon	Mount Lemmon Survey	·	950 m	MPC · JPL
503113	2015 FV_{323}	—	September 20, 2006	Catalina	CSS	·	3.1 km	MPC · JPL
503114	2015 FS_{325}	—	May 7, 2010	Mount Lemmon	Mount Lemmon Survey	·	3.4 km	MPC · JPL
503115	2015 FJ_{327}	—	April 17, 2005	Kitt Peak	Spacewatch	·	1.7 km	MPC · JPL
503116	2015 FF_{329}	—	April 10, 2010	Mount Lemmon	Mount Lemmon Survey	EOS	1.8 km	MPC · JPL
503117	2015 FH_{329}	—	November 18, 2007	Mount Lemmon	Mount Lemmon Survey	·	4.0 km	MPC · JPL
503118	2015 FG_{330}	—	November 17, 2009	Kitt Peak	Spacewatch	·	1.4 km	MPC · JPL
503119	2015 FL_{331}	—	September 18, 2006	Kitt Peak	Spacewatch	·	2.7 km	MPC · JPL
503120	2015 FX_{331}	—	March 14, 2010	Kitt Peak	Spacewatch	·	6.2 km	MPC · JPL
503121	2015 FE_{334}	—	August 24, 2011	Haleakala	Pan-STARRS 1	VER	2.4 km	MPC · JPL
503122	2015 FY_{341}	—	January 17, 2009	Kitt Peak	Spacewatch	HYG	3.0 km	MPC · JPL
503123	2015 FA_{342}	—	September 28, 2003	Kitt Peak	Spacewatch	·	2.8 km	MPC · JPL
503124	2015 FB_{342}	—	September 30, 2003	Kitt Peak	Spacewatch	HOF	3.8 km	MPC · JPL
503125	2015 FE_{343}	—	November 10, 2013	Kitt Peak	Spacewatch	·	1.8 km	MPC · JPL
503126	2015 FL_{343}	—	September 28, 2013	Haleakala	Pan-STARRS 1	H	680 m	MPC · JPL
503127	2015 FS_{363}	—	March 2, 2006	Kitt Peak	Spacewatch	·	1.9 km	MPC · JPL
503128	2015 FS_{366}	—	December 31, 2008	Catalina	CSS	·	4.4 km	MPC · JPL
503129	2015 FP_{371}	—	July 28, 2008	Mount Lemmon	Mount Lemmon Survey	EUN	1.3 km	MPC · JPL
503130	2015 FL_{377}	—	December 4, 2008	Kitt Peak	Spacewatch	EOS	3.1 km	MPC · JPL
503131	2015 FF_{380}	—	September 18, 2007	Catalina	CSS	EOS	2.4 km	MPC · JPL
503132	2015 FO_{383}	—	January 16, 2009	Kitt Peak	Spacewatch	·	3.8 km	MPC · JPL
503133	2015 FB_{384}	—	January 8, 2009	Kitt Peak	Spacewatch	·	2.6 km	MPC · JPL
503134	2015 FE_{390}	—	November 9, 2007	Mount Lemmon	Mount Lemmon Survey	·	2.6 km	MPC · JPL
503135	2015 GK_{3}	—	August 30, 2006	Anderson Mesa	LONEOS	·	3.0 km	MPC · JPL
503136	2015 GJ_{7}	—	February 23, 2010	WISE	WISE	·	3.7 km	MPC · JPL
503137	2015 GE_{14}	—	October 11, 2012	Mount Lemmon	Mount Lemmon Survey	·	1.9 km	MPC · JPL
503138	2015 GB_{15}	—	March 8, 2005	Mount Lemmon	Mount Lemmon Survey	KOR	1.2 km	MPC · JPL
503139	2015 GT_{15}	—	August 29, 2006	Catalina	CSS	EOS	1.9 km	MPC · JPL
503140	2015 GX_{15}	—	September 25, 2006	Mount Lemmon	Mount Lemmon Survey	·	2.4 km	MPC · JPL
503141	2015 GL_{17}	—	March 3, 2009	Catalina	CSS	·	3.7 km	MPC · JPL
503142	2015 GR_{17}	—	December 31, 2008	Kitt Peak	Spacewatch	·	1.8 km	MPC · JPL
503143	2015 GZ_{19}	—	September 17, 2012	Kitt Peak	Spacewatch	NAE	1.7 km	MPC · JPL
503144	2015 GD_{21}	—	March 8, 2005	Mount Lemmon	Mount Lemmon Survey	KOR	1.3 km	MPC · JPL
503145	2015 GE_{21}	—	February 28, 2009	Kitt Peak	Spacewatch	·	2.6 km	MPC · JPL
503146	2015 GT_{21}	—	March 4, 2005	Mount Lemmon	Mount Lemmon Survey	KOR	1.3 km	MPC · JPL
503147	2015 GG_{23}	—	December 21, 1997	Kitt Peak	Spacewatch	·	2.5 km	MPC · JPL
503148	2015 GV_{24}	—	November 13, 2007	Mount Lemmon	Mount Lemmon Survey	·	2.6 km	MPC · JPL
503149	2015 GR_{25}	—	November 4, 2007	Kitt Peak	Spacewatch	·	3.5 km	MPC · JPL
503150	2015 GZ_{25}	—	December 31, 2013	Kitt Peak	Spacewatch	·	3.2 km	MPC · JPL
503151	2015 GJ_{26}	—	April 10, 2010	Mount Lemmon	Mount Lemmon Survey	·	2.1 km	MPC · JPL
503152	2015 GY_{28}	—	September 16, 2006	Kitt Peak	Spacewatch	·	3.1 km	MPC · JPL
503153	2015 GL_{29}	—	September 20, 1995	Kitt Peak	Spacewatch	·	4.7 km	MPC · JPL
503154	2015 GN_{30}	—	September 11, 2007	Mount Lemmon	Mount Lemmon Survey	KOR	1.3 km	MPC · JPL
503155	2015 GM_{31}	—	March 15, 2004	Kitt Peak	Spacewatch	THM	2.1 km	MPC · JPL
503156	2015 GU_{32}	—	March 1, 2009	Kitt Peak	Spacewatch	·	2.9 km	MPC · JPL
503157	2015 GZ_{32}	—	May 3, 2005	Kitt Peak	Spacewatch	EOS	1.6 km	MPC · JPL
503158	2015 GA_{33}	—	July 27, 2011	Haleakala	Pan-STARRS 1	·	2.7 km	MPC · JPL
503159	2015 GE_{34}	—	February 3, 2009	Mount Lemmon	Mount Lemmon Survey	·	2.6 km	MPC · JPL
503160	2015 GQ_{36}	—	April 24, 2001	Anderson Mesa	LONEOS	·	2.8 km	MPC · JPL
503161	2015 GS_{36}	—	October 8, 1999	Kitt Peak	Spacewatch	CYB	3.8 km	MPC · JPL
503162	2015 GT_{36}	—	October 17, 2012	Haleakala	Pan-STARRS 1	·	2.6 km	MPC · JPL
503163	2015 GK_{37}	—	January 16, 2005	Kitt Peak	Spacewatch	·	2.2 km	MPC · JPL
503164	2015 GM_{37}	—	March 16, 2004	Kitt Peak	Spacewatch	VER	3.2 km	MPC · JPL
503165	2015 GC_{38}	—	December 22, 2008	Mount Lemmon	Mount Lemmon Survey	·	1.8 km	MPC · JPL
503166	2015 GD_{38}	—	December 19, 2003	Kitt Peak	Spacewatch	·	1.9 km	MPC · JPL
503167	2015 GM_{38}	—	January 25, 2009	Kitt Peak	Spacewatch	·	2.3 km	MPC · JPL
503168	2015 GO_{38}	—	December 15, 2004	Socorro	LINEAR	·	2.2 km	MPC · JPL
503169	2015 GS_{38}	—	October 20, 2007	Mount Lemmon	Mount Lemmon Survey	EOS	2.0 km	MPC · JPL
503170	2015 GB_{39}	—	January 26, 2006	Mount Lemmon	Mount Lemmon Survey	EUN	1.3 km	MPC · JPL
503171	2015 GC_{39}	—	November 2, 2007	Mount Lemmon	Mount Lemmon Survey	·	2.7 km	MPC · JPL
503172	2015 GE_{40}	—	March 3, 2005	Kitt Peak	Spacewatch	AGN	1.5 km	MPC · JPL
503173	2015 GQ_{40}	—	October 15, 2006	Kitt Peak	Spacewatch	·	3.4 km	MPC · JPL
503174	2015 GQ_{41}	—	February 13, 2010	Socorro	LINEAR	·	2.1 km	MPC · JPL
503175	2015 GH_{43}	—	March 1, 2009	Kitt Peak	Spacewatch	·	2.7 km	MPC · JPL
503176	2015 GK_{43}	—	October 8, 2008	Catalina	CSS	·	2.7 km	MPC · JPL
503177	2015 GL_{43}	—	October 30, 2007	Kitt Peak	Spacewatch	EOS	1.5 km	MPC · JPL
503178	2015 GM_{43}	—	December 4, 2008	Kitt Peak	Spacewatch	·	1.4 km	MPC · JPL
503179	2015 GA_{44}	—	March 19, 2009	Mount Lemmon	Mount Lemmon Survey	·	3.3 km	MPC · JPL
503180	2015 GD_{44}	—	October 20, 2007	Mount Lemmon	Mount Lemmon Survey	·	2.8 km	MPC · JPL
503181	2015 GH_{44}	—	November 9, 2007	Kitt Peak	Spacewatch	·	2.5 km	MPC · JPL
503182	2015 GQ_{44}	—	October 17, 2012	Haleakala	Pan-STARRS 1	·	3.2 km	MPC · JPL
503183	2015 GF_{45}	—	May 24, 2006	Kitt Peak	Spacewatch	·	2.5 km	MPC · JPL
503184	2015 GH_{45}	—	January 18, 2009	Mount Lemmon	Mount Lemmon Survey	·	2.6 km	MPC · JPL
503185	2015 GX_{46}	—	October 7, 2012	Haleakala	Pan-STARRS 1	·	2.6 km	MPC · JPL
503186	2015 GS_{48}	—	January 12, 2008	Kitt Peak	Spacewatch	·	2.5 km	MPC · JPL
503187	2015 HM	—	November 3, 2007	Kitt Peak	Spacewatch	·	3.1 km	MPC · JPL
503188	2015 HX_{2}	—	September 26, 2008	Mount Lemmon	Mount Lemmon Survey	EUN	1.4 km	MPC · JPL
503189	2015 HX_{3}	—	November 30, 2008	Kitt Peak	Spacewatch	·	2.0 km	MPC · JPL
503190	2015 HE_{4}	—	September 16, 2006	Kitt Peak	Spacewatch	·	2.9 km	MPC · JPL
503191	2015 HC_{5}	—	August 29, 2006	Kitt Peak	Spacewatch	·	4.6 km	MPC · JPL
503192	2015 HD_{5}	—	November 9, 2007	Kitt Peak	Spacewatch	EOS	1.9 km	MPC · JPL
503193	2015 HL_{5}	—	March 2, 2001	Kitt Peak	Spacewatch	·	3.5 km	MPC · JPL
503194	2015 HQ_{5}	—	December 21, 2008	Mount Lemmon	Mount Lemmon Survey	EOS	4.1 km	MPC · JPL
503195	2015 HL_{6}	—	September 3, 2008	Kitt Peak	Spacewatch	·	2.5 km	MPC · JPL
503196	2015 HA_{9}	—	April 7, 2000	Anderson Mesa	LONEOS	·	1.5 km	MPC · JPL
503197	2015 HA_{11}	—	September 14, 2013	Mount Lemmon	Mount Lemmon Survey	H	540 m	MPC · JPL
503198	2015 HD_{12}	—	September 13, 2007	Mount Lemmon	Mount Lemmon Survey	·	4.1 km	MPC · JPL
503199	2015 HJ_{14}	—	April 10, 2010	Mount Lemmon	Mount Lemmon Survey	·	2.7 km	MPC · JPL
503200	2015 HV_{14}	—	February 20, 2014	Haleakala	Pan-STARRS 1	EOS	2.2 km	MPC · JPL

== 503201–503300 ==
back to top

Designation			Discovery			Properties		Ref
Permanent	Provisional	Named after	Date	Site	Discoverer(s)	Category	Diam.	Ref
503201	2015 HF_{16}	—	January 15, 2011	Catalina	CSS	·	1.7 km	MPC · JPL
503202	2015 HM_{18}	—	July 5, 1995	Kitt Peak	Spacewatch	EOS	2.2 km	MPC · JPL
503203	2015 HT_{20}	—	September 18, 2006	Kitt Peak	Spacewatch	(1298)	3.0 km	MPC · JPL
503204	2015 HB_{21}	—	October 26, 2013	Kitt Peak	Spacewatch	·	1.5 km	MPC · JPL
503205	2015 HY_{23}	—	November 4, 2007	Kitt Peak	Spacewatch	·	2.6 km	MPC · JPL
503206	2015 HJ_{25}	—	May 26, 2009	Mount Lemmon	Mount Lemmon Survey	CYB	3.5 km	MPC · JPL
503207	2015 HY_{28}	—	September 17, 2012	Kitt Peak	Spacewatch	·	2.8 km	MPC · JPL
503208	2015 HH_{30}	—	November 20, 2003	Kitt Peak	Spacewatch	·	2.6 km	MPC · JPL
503209	2015 HS_{30}	—	October 20, 2007	Mount Lemmon	Mount Lemmon Survey	NAE	3.5 km	MPC · JPL
503210	2015 HB_{31}	—	September 18, 2006	Kitt Peak	Spacewatch	·	3.0 km	MPC · JPL
503211	2015 HN_{34}	—	April 8, 2010	Kitt Peak	Spacewatch	EOS	1.8 km	MPC · JPL
503212	2015 HM_{35}	—	May 1, 2004	Kitt Peak	Spacewatch	·	3.7 km	MPC · JPL
503213	2015 HN_{36}	—	January 11, 2014	Kitt Peak	Spacewatch	·	1.9 km	MPC · JPL
503214	2015 HX_{36}	—	April 10, 2010	WISE	WISE	·	4.5 km	MPC · JPL
503215	2015 HV_{37}	—	March 1, 2009	Catalina	CSS	·	3.1 km	MPC · JPL
503216	2015 HB_{40}	—	March 29, 2004	Socorro	LINEAR	·	5.1 km	MPC · JPL
503217	2015 HD_{41}	—	February 4, 2002	Anderson Mesa	LONEOS	·	1.0 km	MPC · JPL
503218	2015 HA_{42}	—	August 25, 2001	Socorro	LINEAR	·	2.6 km	MPC · JPL
503219	2015 HN_{42}	—	November 2, 2007	Kitt Peak	Spacewatch	·	3.3 km	MPC · JPL
503220	2015 HS_{42}	—	January 28, 2015	Haleakala	Pan-STARRS 1	·	3.3 km	MPC · JPL
503221	2015 HV_{47}	—	June 11, 2010	Mount Lemmon	Mount Lemmon Survey	·	2.7 km	MPC · JPL
503222	2015 HB_{51}	—	October 16, 2006	Catalina	CSS	·	3.8 km	MPC · JPL
503223	2015 HL_{63}	—	February 3, 1997	Kitt Peak	Spacewatch	THM	2.1 km	MPC · JPL
503224	2015 HL_{64}	—	April 26, 2004	Anderson Mesa	LONEOS	·	2.9 km	MPC · JPL
503225	2015 HC_{74}	—	August 21, 2006	Kitt Peak	Spacewatch	EOS	1.9 km	MPC · JPL
503226	2015 HO_{84}	—	January 17, 2009	Mount Lemmon	Mount Lemmon Survey	·	1.4 km	MPC · JPL
503227	2015 HG_{95}	—	March 4, 2006	Kitt Peak	Spacewatch	3:2	4.8 km	MPC · JPL
503228	2015 HK_{99}	—	October 23, 2004	Kitt Peak	Spacewatch	JUN	1.1 km	MPC · JPL
503229	2015 HU_{101}	—	April 1, 2015	Haleakala	Pan-STARRS 1	·	2.1 km	MPC · JPL
503230	2015 HC_{103}	—	November 21, 2000	Socorro	LINEAR	T_{j} (2.98)	4.9 km	MPC · JPL
503231	2015 HP_{104}	—	November 13, 2007	Kitt Peak	Spacewatch	·	2.7 km	MPC · JPL
503232	2015 HE_{108}	—	February 14, 2010	Kitt Peak	Spacewatch	·	1.8 km	MPC · JPL
503233	2015 HD_{109}	—	January 28, 2015	Haleakala	Pan-STARRS 1	·	2.5 km	MPC · JPL
503234	2015 HE_{118}	—	October 30, 2002	Kitt Peak	Spacewatch	3:2	5.4 km	MPC · JPL
503235	2015 HL_{137}	—	February 8, 2014	Mount Lemmon	Mount Lemmon Survey	·	2.2 km	MPC · JPL
503236	2015 HQ_{138}	—	September 4, 2011	Haleakala	Pan-STARRS 1	·	4.0 km	MPC · JPL
503237	2015 HH_{145}	—	January 31, 2003	Kitt Peak	Spacewatch	·	3.6 km	MPC · JPL
503238	2015 HD_{149}	—	September 19, 2012	Mount Lemmon	Mount Lemmon Survey	·	2.5 km	MPC · JPL
503239	2015 HO_{152}	—	October 4, 2006	Mount Lemmon	Mount Lemmon Survey	·	3.9 km	MPC · JPL
503240	2015 HX_{171}	—	October 29, 2005	Catalina	CSS	(5)	1.2 km	MPC · JPL
503241	2015 HK_{173}	—	August 24, 2011	Haleakala	Pan-STARRS 1	EOS	2.4 km	MPC · JPL
503242	2015 HL_{175}	—	May 23, 2011	Mount Lemmon	Mount Lemmon Survey	EUN	1.2 km	MPC · JPL
503243	2015 HN_{176}	—	November 12, 2007	Mount Lemmon	Mount Lemmon Survey	·	4.2 km	MPC · JPL
503244	2015 HR_{181}	—	September 29, 2011	Mount Lemmon	Mount Lemmon Survey	·	3.2 km	MPC · JPL
503245	2015 JM_{2}	—	December 26, 1998	Caussols	ODAS	·	3.5 km	MPC · JPL
503246	2015 KV_{6}	—	March 19, 2009	Mount Lemmon	Mount Lemmon Survey	·	3.8 km	MPC · JPL
503247	2015 KP_{7}	—	April 22, 2009	Mount Lemmon	Mount Lemmon Survey	·	3.7 km	MPC · JPL
503248	2015 KN_{9}	—	January 18, 2008	Mount Lemmon	Mount Lemmon Survey	·	2.8 km	MPC · JPL
503249	2015 KU_{10}	—	April 19, 2015	Kitt Peak	Spacewatch	·	2.6 km	MPC · JPL
503250	2015 KO_{15}	—	February 26, 2014	Haleakala	Pan-STARRS 1	·	3.0 km	MPC · JPL
503251	2015 KX_{17}	—	December 7, 2012	Haleakala	Pan-STARRS 1	·	3.3 km	MPC · JPL
503252	2015 KJ_{18}	—	February 24, 2014	Haleakala	Pan-STARRS 1	·	2.7 km	MPC · JPL
503253	2015 KB_{28}	—	April 23, 2015	Haleakala	Pan-STARRS 1	T_{j} (2.99) · 3:2	4.5 km	MPC · JPL
503254	2015 KF_{45}	—	March 16, 2007	Kitt Peak	Spacewatch	·	1.2 km	MPC · JPL
503255	2015 KM_{71}	—	January 14, 2002	Palomar	NEAT	·	4.5 km	MPC · JPL
503256	2015 KL_{76}	—	February 27, 2015	Haleakala	Pan-STARRS 1	EOS	1.8 km	MPC · JPL
503257	2015 KT_{78}	—	December 14, 2006	Mount Lemmon	Mount Lemmon Survey	CYB	3.9 km	MPC · JPL
503258	2015 KR_{81}	—	September 4, 2008	Kitt Peak	Spacewatch	·	1.6 km	MPC · JPL
503259	2015 KG_{84}	—	December 9, 2012	Haleakala	Pan-STARRS 1	·	3.0 km	MPC · JPL
503260	2015 KS_{105}	—	September 4, 2011	Haleakala	Pan-STARRS 1	·	2.4 km	MPC · JPL
503261	2015 KY_{116}	—	December 18, 2007	Mount Lemmon	Mount Lemmon Survey	EOS	2.6 km	MPC · JPL
503262	2015 KE_{127}	—	May 13, 2015	Mount Lemmon	Mount Lemmon Survey	L4	7.6 km	MPC · JPL
503263	2015 LT_{2}	—	November 7, 2012	Mount Lemmon	Mount Lemmon Survey	EOS	2.3 km	MPC · JPL
503264	2015 LG_{4}	—	October 8, 2008	Mount Lemmon	Mount Lemmon Survey	·	1.9 km	MPC · JPL
503265	2015 LK_{35}	—	June 10, 2010	WISE	WISE	CYB	5.9 km	MPC · JPL
503266	2015 MS_{1}	—	January 26, 2014	Haleakala	Pan-STARRS 1	·	3.0 km	MPC · JPL
503267	2015 MG_{51}	—	March 29, 2014	Haleakala	Pan-STARRS 1	·	3.0 km	MPC · JPL
503268	2015 OA_{2}	—	December 4, 2013	Haleakala	Pan-STARRS 1	H	540 m	MPC · JPL
503269	2015 OB_{3}	—	June 22, 2010	Kitt Peak	Spacewatch	·	2.5 km	MPC · JPL
503270	2015 OA_{20}	—	October 28, 2005	Mount Lemmon	Mount Lemmon Survey	·	3.4 km	MPC · JPL
503271	2015 PQ_{33}	—	November 1, 2006	Mount Lemmon	Mount Lemmon Survey	·	2.7 km	MPC · JPL
503272	2015 PE_{231}	—	May 21, 2014	Haleakala	Pan-STARRS 1	·	3.3 km	MPC · JPL
503273	2015 PN_{291}	—	July 25, 2014	Haleakala	Pan-STARRS 1	centaur	20 km	MPC · JPL
503274	2015 QE_{9}	—	August 24, 2011	Haleakala	Pan-STARRS 1	AMO	460 m	MPC · JPL
503275	2015 RS_{5}	—	January 24, 2014	Haleakala	Pan-STARRS 1	H	460 m	MPC · JPL
503276	2015 RE_{12}	—	February 20, 2014	Haleakala	Pan-STARRS 1	H	450 m	MPC · JPL
503277	2015 RT_{83}	—	September 15, 2015	Mayhill	L. Elenin	AMO	380 m	MPC · JPL
503278	2015 SR_{1}	—	October 12, 2010	Mount Lemmon	Mount Lemmon Survey	·	2.7 km	MPC · JPL
503279	2015 TS_{144}	—	June 1, 2009	Mount Lemmon	Mount Lemmon Survey	H	550 m	MPC · JPL
503280	2015 TD_{300}	—	July 1, 2014	Haleakala	Pan-STARRS 1	·	3.1 km	MPC · JPL
503281	2015 TC_{303}	—	December 5, 2008	Kitt Peak	Spacewatch	·	1.6 km	MPC · JPL
503282	2015 UN_{4}	—	January 17, 2013	Mount Lemmon	Mount Lemmon Survey	·	1.4 km	MPC · JPL
503283	2015 UU_{17}	—	February 28, 2008	Mount Lemmon	Mount Lemmon Survey	·	2.0 km	MPC · JPL
503284	2015 VF_{78}	—	June 28, 2014	Haleakala	Pan-STARRS 1	EOS	1.9 km	MPC · JPL
503285	2015 VW_{108}	—	June 25, 2014	Mount Lemmon	Mount Lemmon Survey	·	2.8 km	MPC · JPL
503286	2015 VM_{118}	—	October 4, 2002	Socorro	LINEAR	H	480 m	MPC · JPL
503287	2015 VA_{126}	—	March 10, 2000	Socorro	LINEAR	T_{j} (2.98)	2.9 km	MPC · JPL
503288	2015 XT_{170}	—	January 9, 2011	Mount Lemmon	Mount Lemmon Survey	H	470 m	MPC · JPL
503289	2015 XU_{288}	—	January 17, 2009	Kitt Peak	Spacewatch	NYS	950 m	MPC · JPL
503290	2015 YF_{2}	—	July 12, 1999	Socorro	LINEAR	H	570 m	MPC · JPL
503291	2015 YY_{7}	—	January 4, 2011	Mount Lemmon	Mount Lemmon Survey	H	370 m	MPC · JPL
503292	2016 AD_{3}	—	October 5, 2012	Haleakala	Pan-STARRS 1	H	650 m	MPC · JPL
503293	2016 AA_{9}	—	November 21, 2006	Catalina	CSS	AMO	490 m	MPC · JPL
503294	2016 AF_{24}	—	January 3, 2009	Mount Lemmon	Mount Lemmon Survey	NYS	870 m	MPC · JPL
503295	2016 AM_{30}	—	April 15, 2008	Kitt Peak	Spacewatch	·	1.6 km	MPC · JPL
503296	2016 AN_{36}	—	July 11, 2004	Socorro	LINEAR	JUN	1.3 km	MPC · JPL
503297	2016 AY_{53}	—	January 14, 2008	Kitt Peak	Spacewatch	·	1.3 km	MPC · JPL
503298	2016 AW_{61}	—	February 9, 2013	Haleakala	Pan-STARRS 1	·	750 m	MPC · JPL
503299	2016 AP_{66}	—	September 4, 2012	Haleakala	Pan-STARRS 1	H	450 m	MPC · JPL
503300	2016 AF_{75}	—	January 4, 2016	Haleakala	Pan-STARRS 1	·	750 m	MPC · JPL

== 503301–503400 ==
back to top

Designation			Discovery			Properties		Ref
Permanent	Provisional	Named after	Date	Site	Discoverer(s)	Category	Diam.	Ref
503301	2016 AX_{78}	—	May 6, 2002	Kitt Peak	Spacewatch	·	970 m	MPC · JPL
503302	2016 AB_{99}	—	February 22, 2009	Kitt Peak	Spacewatch	·	900 m	MPC · JPL
503303	2016 AB_{109}	—	July 13, 2013	Haleakala	Pan-STARRS 1	·	1.0 km	MPC · JPL
503304	2016 AV_{110}	—	April 19, 1998	Kitt Peak	Spacewatch	·	890 m	MPC · JPL
503305	2016 AO_{111}	—	February 8, 2011	Catalina	CSS	H	540 m	MPC · JPL
503306	2016 AB_{113}	—	November 23, 2014	Haleakala	Pan-STARRS 1	·	3.3 km	MPC · JPL
503307	2016 AH_{113}	—	September 4, 2014	Haleakala	Pan-STARRS 1	GEF	1.3 km	MPC · JPL
503308	2016 AL_{115}	—	March 19, 2009	Catalina	CSS	·	1.0 km	MPC · JPL
503309	2016 AN_{122}	—	June 26, 2006	Siding Spring	SSS	PHO	1.0 km	MPC · JPL
503310	2016 AF_{124}	—	February 1, 2012	Mount Lemmon	Mount Lemmon Survey	EUN	1.3 km	MPC · JPL
503311	2016 AU_{124}	—	January 16, 2005	Kitt Peak	Spacewatch	NYS	1.2 km	MPC · JPL
503312	2016 AK_{125}	—	March 3, 2005	Catalina	CSS	·	1.2 km	MPC · JPL
503313	2016 AC_{126}	—	December 16, 2004	Catalina	CSS	PHO	1.2 km	MPC · JPL
503314	2016 AO_{127}	—	January 15, 2010	Mount Lemmon	Mount Lemmon Survey	·	2.5 km	MPC · JPL
503315	2016 AG_{128}	—	March 30, 2011	Mount Lemmon	Mount Lemmon Survey	H	420 m	MPC · JPL
503316	2016 AQ_{129}	—	January 28, 2004	Kitt Peak	Spacewatch	·	3.5 km	MPC · JPL
503317	2016 AA_{131}	—	August 15, 2009	Catalina	CSS	H	500 m	MPC · JPL
503318	2016 AC_{131}	—	November 4, 2012	Haleakala	Pan-STARRS 1	H	590 m	MPC · JPL
503319	2016 AR_{142}	—	July 13, 2013	Mount Lemmon	Mount Lemmon Survey	·	2.1 km	MPC · JPL
503320	2016 AZ_{160}	—	October 16, 2014	Mount Lemmon	Mount Lemmon Survey	BRA	1.5 km	MPC · JPL
503321	2016 AK_{164}	—	October 4, 2012	Haleakala	Pan-STARRS 1	H	450 m	MPC · JPL
503322	2016 AV_{178}	—	January 11, 2016	Haleakala	Pan-STARRS 1	·	1.4 km	MPC · JPL
503323	2016 AL_{181}	—	April 2, 2011	Mount Lemmon	Mount Lemmon Survey	EOS	1.4 km	MPC · JPL
503324	2016 AA_{192}	—	December 19, 2004	Mount Lemmon	Mount Lemmon Survey	·	1.4 km	MPC · JPL
503325	2016 BB	—	November 12, 2007	Catalina	CSS	H	540 m	MPC · JPL
503326	2016 BZ_{5}	—	April 26, 2006	Siding Spring	SSS	·	1.1 km	MPC · JPL
503327	2016 BB_{6}	—	December 21, 2006	Mount Lemmon	Mount Lemmon Survey	·	1.7 km	MPC · JPL
503328	2016 BN_{8}	—	January 17, 2007	Kitt Peak	Spacewatch	EUN	1.2 km	MPC · JPL
503329	2016 BO_{8}	—	January 2, 2012	Mount Lemmon	Mount Lemmon Survey	·	940 m	MPC · JPL
503330	2016 BT_{9}	—	April 27, 2012	Haleakala	Pan-STARRS 1	·	1.4 km	MPC · JPL
503331	2016 BT_{10}	—	July 15, 2013	Haleakala	Pan-STARRS 1	·	1.1 km	MPC · JPL
503332	2016 BN_{12}	—	December 9, 2010	Mount Lemmon	Mount Lemmon Survey	H	420 m	MPC · JPL
503333	2016 BG_{19}	—	December 10, 2005	Kitt Peak	Spacewatch	·	600 m	MPC · JPL
503334	2016 BD_{20}	—	December 25, 2005	Kitt Peak	Spacewatch	·	560 m	MPC · JPL
503335	2016 BG_{20}	—	December 28, 2005	Kitt Peak	Spacewatch	·	540 m	MPC · JPL
503336	2016 BO_{25}	—	March 9, 2011	Mount Lemmon	Mount Lemmon Survey	H	380 m	MPC · JPL
503337	2016 BA_{26}	—	November 8, 2007	Kitt Peak	Spacewatch	·	1.1 km	MPC · JPL
503338	2016 BM_{30}	—	October 19, 2011	Kitt Peak	Spacewatch	·	690 m	MPC · JPL
503339	2016 BW_{36}	—	March 16, 2009	Kitt Peak	Spacewatch	NYS	830 m	MPC · JPL
503340	2016 BY_{36}	—	April 12, 2005	Kitt Peak	Spacewatch	NYS	1.2 km	MPC · JPL
503341	2016 BB_{39}	—	October 17, 2012	Haleakala	Pan-STARRS 1	H	630 m	MPC · JPL
503342	2016 BL_{39}	—	March 6, 2011	Mount Lemmon	Mount Lemmon Survey	H	440 m	MPC · JPL
503343	2016 BG_{41}	—	January 10, 2008	Mount Lemmon	Mount Lemmon Survey	·	990 m	MPC · JPL
503344	2016 BM_{44}	—	November 18, 2007	Mount Lemmon	Mount Lemmon Survey	MAS	720 m	MPC · JPL
503345	2016 BJ_{48}	—	June 1, 2012	Mount Lemmon	Mount Lemmon Survey	EOS	1.7 km	MPC · JPL
503346	2016 BM_{48}	—	April 2, 2009	Mount Lemmon	Mount Lemmon Survey	·	980 m	MPC · JPL
503347	2016 BP_{56}	—	December 30, 2008	Mount Lemmon	Mount Lemmon Survey	·	970 m	MPC · JPL
503348	2016 BX_{58}	—	March 18, 2007	Kitt Peak	Spacewatch	·	1.0 km	MPC · JPL
503349	2016 BX_{59}	—	January 26, 2012	Mount Lemmon	Mount Lemmon Survey	·	1.3 km	MPC · JPL
503350	2016 BH_{62}	—	January 26, 2006	Kitt Peak	Spacewatch	·	1.6 km	MPC · JPL
503351	2016 BS_{62}	—	March 13, 2013	Mount Lemmon	Mount Lemmon Survey	·	490 m	MPC · JPL
503352	2016 BJ_{63}	—	April 6, 2013	Mount Lemmon	Mount Lemmon Survey	·	630 m	MPC · JPL
503353	2016 BR_{70}	—	February 26, 2012	Kitt Peak	Spacewatch	·	1.1 km	MPC · JPL
503354	2016 BZ_{72}	—	March 24, 2006	Kitt Peak	Spacewatch	·	2.3 km	MPC · JPL
503355	2016 BH_{75}	—	April 15, 2013	Haleakala	Pan-STARRS 1	·	630 m	MPC · JPL
503356	2016 BS_{79}	—	October 11, 2007	Mount Lemmon	Mount Lemmon Survey	·	570 m	MPC · JPL
503357	2016 BW_{79}	—	August 25, 2014	Haleakala	Pan-STARRS 1	·	660 m	MPC · JPL
503358	2016 CT	—	March 16, 2013	Mount Lemmon	Mount Lemmon Survey	·	510 m	MPC · JPL
503359	2016 CO_{3}	—	October 25, 2011	Haleakala	Pan-STARRS 1	·	720 m	MPC · JPL
503360	2016 CB_{5}	—	November 17, 2011	Mount Lemmon	Mount Lemmon Survey	·	940 m	MPC · JPL
503361	2016 CG_{7}	—	April 2, 2005	Mount Lemmon	Mount Lemmon Survey	MAS	680 m	MPC · JPL
503362	2016 CT_{7}	—	November 12, 2010	Westfield	International Astronomical Search Collaboration	·	1.7 km	MPC · JPL
503363	2016 CW_{7}	—	March 11, 2005	Mount Lemmon	Mount Lemmon Survey	NYS	1.3 km	MPC · JPL
503364	2016 CE_{8}	—	December 20, 2004	Mount Lemmon	Mount Lemmon Survey	NYS	910 m	MPC · JPL
503365	2016 CH_{9}	—	July 27, 2014	Haleakala	Pan-STARRS 1	·	740 m	MPC · JPL
503366	2016 CK_{13}	—	May 26, 2006	Mount Lemmon	Mount Lemmon Survey	·	1.1 km	MPC · JPL
503367	2016 CR_{13}	—	February 12, 2008	Mount Lemmon	Mount Lemmon Survey	·	980 m	MPC · JPL
503368	2016 CW_{14}	—	June 12, 2013	Haleakala	Pan-STARRS 1	·	620 m	MPC · JPL
503369	2016 CQ_{23}	—	February 10, 2002	Socorro	LINEAR	·	1.2 km	MPC · JPL
503370	2016 CL_{24}	—	April 2, 2013	Mount Lemmon	Mount Lemmon Survey	·	730 m	MPC · JPL
503371	2016 CD_{28}	—	January 7, 2010	Kitt Peak	Spacewatch	·	2.9 km	MPC · JPL
503372	2016 CQ_{30}	—	January 27, 2011	Kitt Peak	Spacewatch	H	310 m	MPC · JPL
503373	2016 CL_{31}	—	December 22, 2012	Haleakala	Pan-STARRS 1	H	470 m	MPC · JPL
503374	2016 CS_{32}	—	November 5, 2007	Kitt Peak	Spacewatch	·	1.1 km	MPC · JPL
503375	2016 CX_{32}	—	April 15, 2007	Catalina	CSS	·	1.7 km	MPC · JPL
503376	2016 CR_{35}	—	January 18, 2009	Mount Lemmon	Mount Lemmon Survey	·	1.4 km	MPC · JPL
503377	2016 CG_{49}	—	February 20, 2006	Kitt Peak	Spacewatch	·	670 m	MPC · JPL
503378	2016 CO_{61}	—	March 4, 2008	Mount Lemmon	Mount Lemmon Survey	·	1.2 km	MPC · JPL
503379	2016 CK_{70}	—	November 18, 2003	Kitt Peak	Spacewatch	EOS	2.3 km	MPC · JPL
503380	2016 CJ_{72}	—	November 26, 2014	Haleakala	Pan-STARRS 1	·	2.9 km	MPC · JPL
503381	2016 CP_{72}	—	April 9, 2002	Socorro	LINEAR	NYS	900 m	MPC · JPL
503382	2016 CC_{79}	—	May 15, 2013	Haleakala	Pan-STARRS 1	V	530 m	MPC · JPL
503383	2016 CF_{94}	—	November 26, 2005	Kitt Peak	Spacewatch	GEF	1.3 km	MPC · JPL
503384	2016 CO_{102}	—	September 9, 2007	Kitt Peak	Spacewatch	·	1.2 km	MPC · JPL
503385	2016 CX_{107}	—	October 14, 2014	Mount Lemmon	Mount Lemmon Survey	·	1.1 km	MPC · JPL
503386	2016 CZ_{114}	—	February 24, 2012	Haleakala	Pan-STARRS 1	·	1.1 km	MPC · JPL
503387	2016 CP_{118}	—	October 18, 2007	Mount Lemmon	Mount Lemmon Survey	(2076)	680 m	MPC · JPL
503388	2016 CY_{120}	—	March 11, 2008	Kitt Peak	Spacewatch	·	1.0 km	MPC · JPL
503389	2016 CQ_{143}	—	January 8, 2006	Mount Lemmon	Mount Lemmon Survey	PHO	930 m	MPC · JPL
503390	2016 CN_{148}	—	April 8, 2013	Mount Lemmon	Mount Lemmon Survey	·	570 m	MPC · JPL
503391	2016 CO_{160}	—	February 28, 2006	Mount Lemmon	Mount Lemmon Survey	·	610 m	MPC · JPL
503392	2016 CC_{163}	—	April 9, 2010	Kitt Peak	Spacewatch	·	720 m	MPC · JPL
503393	2016 CV_{188}	—	January 27, 2012	Mount Lemmon	Mount Lemmon Survey	·	1.1 km	MPC · JPL
503394	2016 CP_{189}	—	May 21, 2006	Kitt Peak	Spacewatch	·	1.8 km	MPC · JPL
503395	2016 CY_{196}	—	May 5, 2008	Catalina	CSS	·	1.3 km	MPC · JPL
503396	2016 CK_{202}	—	February 20, 2006	Kitt Peak	Spacewatch	·	780 m	MPC · JPL
503397	2016 CX_{202}	—	August 21, 2006	Kitt Peak	Spacewatch	·	1.2 km	MPC · JPL
503398	2016 CL_{206}	—	January 3, 2012	Kitt Peak	Spacewatch	·	1.3 km	MPC · JPL
503399	2016 CF_{207}	—	January 19, 2005	Kitt Peak	Spacewatch	NYS	830 m	MPC · JPL
503400	2016 CX_{207}	—	February 26, 2012	Kitt Peak	Spacewatch	·	1.2 km	MPC · JPL

== 503401–503500 ==
back to top

Designation			Discovery			Properties		Ref
Permanent	Provisional	Named after	Date	Site	Discoverer(s)	Category	Diam.	Ref
503401	2016 CC_{215}	—	February 26, 2009	Kitt Peak	Spacewatch	NYS	940 m	MPC · JPL
503402	2016 CG_{227}	—	February 13, 2004	Kitt Peak	Spacewatch	·	1.1 km	MPC · JPL
503403	2016 CG_{242}	—	April 8, 2010	WISE	WISE	·	5.0 km	MPC · JPL
503404	2016 CW_{245}	—	September 15, 2006	Kitt Peak	Spacewatch	TIR	2.2 km	MPC · JPL
503405	2016 CU_{247}	—	September 19, 2009	Catalina	CSS	H	540 m	MPC · JPL
503406	2016 CJ_{250}	—	April 10, 2005	Mount Lemmon	Mount Lemmon Survey	·	1.0 km	MPC · JPL
503407	2016 CC_{251}	—	December 21, 2006	Kitt Peak	Spacewatch	HNS	990 m	MPC · JPL
503408	2016 CV_{258}	—	January 28, 2007	Kitt Peak	Spacewatch	MAR	1.3 km	MPC · JPL
503409	2016 CM_{259}	—	March 4, 2005	Catalina	CSS	·	3.5 km	MPC · JPL
503410	2016 CH_{261}	—	April 19, 1999	Kitt Peak	Spacewatch	·	1.9 km	MPC · JPL
503411	2016 CR_{261}	—	May 5, 2003	Kitt Peak	Spacewatch	·	1.6 km	MPC · JPL
503412	2016 DD	—	February 25, 2011	Kitt Peak	Spacewatch	H	500 m	MPC · JPL
503413	2016 DE	—	July 1, 2014	Haleakala	Pan-STARRS 1	H	500 m	MPC · JPL
503414	2016 DY_{1}	—	January 20, 2008	Mount Lemmon	Mount Lemmon Survey	H	480 m	MPC · JPL
503415	2016 DC_{2}	—	December 10, 2004	Socorro	LINEAR	H	580 m	MPC · JPL
503416	2016 DS_{17}	—	January 13, 2002	Kitt Peak	Spacewatch	·	600 m	MPC · JPL
503417	2016 DA_{21}	—	March 11, 2005	Kitt Peak	Spacewatch	·	2.6 km	MPC · JPL
503418	2016 DD_{24}	—	December 12, 2014	Haleakala	Pan-STARRS 1	·	2.7 km	MPC · JPL
503419	2016 DZ_{24}	—	January 15, 2008	Kitt Peak	Spacewatch	NYS	1.1 km	MPC · JPL
503420	2016 DE_{26}	—	October 24, 2011	Mount Lemmon	Mount Lemmon Survey	·	470 m	MPC · JPL
503421	2016 DL_{27}	—	March 28, 2009	Kitt Peak	Spacewatch	·	1.3 km	MPC · JPL
503422	2016 DP_{30}	—	February 9, 2011	Mount Lemmon	Mount Lemmon Survey	·	2.1 km	MPC · JPL
503423	2016 EC_{2}	—	February 8, 2008	Mount Lemmon	Mount Lemmon Survey	H	500 m	MPC · JPL
503424	2016 EX_{4}	—	February 8, 2008	Mount Lemmon	Mount Lemmon Survey	NYS	1.1 km	MPC · JPL
503425	2016 EC_{8}	—	January 30, 2009	Kitt Peak	Spacewatch	·	770 m	MPC · JPL
503426	2016 EY_{17}	—	May 20, 2013	Haleakala	Pan-STARRS 1	·	1.6 km	MPC · JPL
503427	2016 EX_{24}	—	January 18, 2015	Mount Lemmon	Mount Lemmon Survey	·	2.0 km	MPC · JPL
503428	2016 EY_{24}	—	January 13, 2015	Haleakala	Pan-STARRS 1	·	2.4 km	MPC · JPL
503429	2016 ES_{25}	—	April 2, 2011	Mount Lemmon	Mount Lemmon Survey	·	2.4 km	MPC · JPL
503430	2016 ED_{32}	—	December 7, 1996	Kitt Peak	Spacewatch	·	2.2 km	MPC · JPL
503431	2016 EP_{36}	—	January 12, 2010	Kitt Peak	Spacewatch	·	3.5 km	MPC · JPL
503432	2016 EK_{54}	—	September 1, 2010	Mount Lemmon	Mount Lemmon Survey	·	560 m	MPC · JPL
503433	2016 EF_{55}	—	September 7, 2004	Socorro	LINEAR	H	500 m	MPC · JPL
503434	2016 ES_{55}	—	February 7, 2011	Catalina	CSS	·	350 m	MPC · JPL
503435	2016 EK_{61}	—	August 13, 2012	Haleakala	Pan-STARRS 1	·	2.8 km	MPC · JPL
503436	2016 EX_{74}	—	December 27, 2005	Kitt Peak	Spacewatch	·	520 m	MPC · JPL
503437	2016 EG_{75}	—	February 2, 2009	Kitt Peak	Spacewatch	V	550 m	MPC · JPL
503438	2016 ES_{75}	—	February 27, 2012	Haleakala	Pan-STARRS 1	ADE	1.6 km	MPC · JPL
503439	2016 EA_{77}	—	October 14, 2007	Kitt Peak	Spacewatch	·	700 m	MPC · JPL
503440	2016 EK_{80}	—	February 10, 2002	Socorro	LINEAR	·	2.0 km	MPC · JPL
503441	2016 ET_{87}	—	June 21, 2006	Kitt Peak	Spacewatch	·	950 m	MPC · JPL
503442	2016 EL_{88}	—	October 1, 2013	Mount Lemmon	Mount Lemmon Survey	·	1.8 km	MPC · JPL
503443	2016 EZ_{88}	—	September 28, 2011	Mount Lemmon	Mount Lemmon Survey	·	630 m	MPC · JPL
503444	2016 EO_{95}	—	April 13, 2013	Haleakala	Pan-STARRS 1	·	650 m	MPC · JPL
503445	2016 EM_{110}	—	April 5, 2011	Mount Lemmon	Mount Lemmon Survey	·	3.2 km	MPC · JPL
503446	2016 EJ_{111}	—	September 5, 1999	Kitt Peak	Spacewatch	NYS	910 m	MPC · JPL
503447	2016 EA_{112}	—	January 27, 2012	Mount Lemmon	Mount Lemmon Survey	·	890 m	MPC · JPL
503448	2016 EB_{112}	—	February 13, 2012	Kitt Peak	Spacewatch	·	930 m	MPC · JPL
503449	2016 EQ_{113}	—	February 9, 2005	Kitt Peak	Spacewatch	·	1.2 km	MPC · JPL
503450	2016 EV_{115}	—	August 14, 2013	Haleakala	Pan-STARRS 1	·	2.1 km	MPC · JPL
503451	2016 EY_{115}	—	April 17, 2013	Haleakala	Pan-STARRS 1	·	520 m	MPC · JPL
503452	2016 EC_{116}	—	March 31, 2008	Kitt Peak	Spacewatch	(5)	940 m	MPC · JPL
503453	2016 EW_{118}	—	April 28, 2009	Mount Lemmon	Mount Lemmon Survey	NYS	920 m	MPC · JPL
503454	2016 EQ_{119}	—	March 30, 2008	Kitt Peak	Spacewatch	BRG	1.1 km	MPC · JPL
503455	2016 EV_{119}	—	March 11, 2005	Kitt Peak	Spacewatch	·	940 m	MPC · JPL
503456	2016 EX_{121}	—	May 7, 2006	Mount Lemmon	Mount Lemmon Survey	·	640 m	MPC · JPL
503457	2016 EF_{122}	—	January 11, 2008	Kitt Peak	Spacewatch	·	940 m	MPC · JPL
503458	2016 EN_{124}	—	March 23, 2012	Kitt Peak	Spacewatch	ADE	1.8 km	MPC · JPL
503459	2016 EC_{126}	—	March 21, 2009	Mount Lemmon	Mount Lemmon Survey	NYS	890 m	MPC · JPL
503460	2016 ET_{127}	—	May 10, 2003	Kitt Peak	Spacewatch	·	1.8 km	MPC · JPL
503461	2016 EC_{133}	—	October 15, 2007	Mount Lemmon	Mount Lemmon Survey	·	520 m	MPC · JPL
503462	2016 EH_{139}	—	April 20, 2012	Mount Lemmon	Mount Lemmon Survey	·	1.4 km	MPC · JPL
503463	2016 EU_{139}	—	January 19, 2012	Haleakala	Pan-STARRS 1	·	1.1 km	MPC · JPL
503464	2016 EK_{141}	—	July 13, 2013	Haleakala	Pan-STARRS 1	·	950 m	MPC · JPL
503465	2016 EC_{144}	—	December 4, 2007	Kitt Peak	Spacewatch	NYS	930 m	MPC · JPL
503466	2016 ET_{144}	—	February 23, 2001	Kitt Peak	Spacewatch	·	990 m	MPC · JPL
503467	2016 ED_{145}	—	February 10, 2008	Kitt Peak	Spacewatch	·	770 m	MPC · JPL
503468	2016 EG_{145}	—	September 22, 2009	Mount Lemmon	Mount Lemmon Survey	·	830 m	MPC · JPL
503469	2016 EW_{145}	—	April 28, 2008	Kitt Peak	Spacewatch	·	880 m	MPC · JPL
503470	2016 EK_{146}	—	March 31, 2008	Mount Lemmon	Mount Lemmon Survey	H	360 m	MPC · JPL
503471	2016 ES_{147}	—	October 23, 2014	Kitt Peak	Spacewatch	·	1.1 km	MPC · JPL
503472	2016 EY_{147}	—	March 14, 2007	Mount Lemmon	Mount Lemmon Survey	·	1.2 km	MPC · JPL
503473	2016 EO_{148}	—	January 27, 2011	Mount Lemmon	Mount Lemmon Survey	DOR	1.7 km	MPC · JPL
503474	2016 EY_{152}	—	October 23, 2006	Kitt Peak	Spacewatch	NYS	1.2 km	MPC · JPL
503475	2016 EP_{157}	—	June 2, 2014	Haleakala	Pan-STARRS 1	H	520 m	MPC · JPL
503476	2016 ET_{158}	—	October 5, 2014	Haleakala	Pan-STARRS 1	HNS	1.2 km	MPC · JPL
503477	2016 EJ_{159}	—	March 27, 2012	Mount Lemmon	Mount Lemmon Survey	EUN	1.1 km	MPC · JPL
503478	2016 EF_{162}	—	September 21, 2008	Mount Lemmon	Mount Lemmon Survey	·	2.2 km	MPC · JPL
503479	2016 ET_{163}	—	May 16, 2013	Haleakala	Pan-STARRS 1	·	600 m	MPC · JPL
503480	2016 EX_{164}	—	January 2, 2012	Mount Lemmon	Mount Lemmon Survey	V	500 m	MPC · JPL
503481	2016 EU_{167}	—	February 4, 2012	Haleakala	Pan-STARRS 1	·	1.2 km	MPC · JPL
503482	2016 EO_{172}	—	September 14, 2013	Haleakala	Pan-STARRS 1	·	2.3 km	MPC · JPL
503483	2016 EJ_{173}	—	February 17, 2010	Mount Lemmon	Mount Lemmon Survey	EUP	2.7 km	MPC · JPL
503484	2016 EQ_{175}	—	February 23, 2012	Mount Lemmon	Mount Lemmon Survey	·	1.1 km	MPC · JPL
503485	2016 EU_{175}	—	March 13, 2002	Kitt Peak	Spacewatch	·	610 m	MPC · JPL
503486	2016 EN_{178}	—	May 14, 2012	Haleakala	Pan-STARRS 1	·	1.1 km	MPC · JPL
503487	2016 EA_{181}	—	January 6, 2012	Haleakala	Pan-STARRS 1	·	1.2 km	MPC · JPL
503488	2016 EZ_{181}	—	September 20, 2014	Mount Lemmon	Mount Lemmon Survey	·	1.2 km	MPC · JPL
503489	2016 EM_{186}	—	September 4, 1999	Kitt Peak	Spacewatch	·	2.1 km	MPC · JPL
503490	2016 ES_{187}	—	February 28, 2012	Haleakala	Pan-STARRS 1	·	1.1 km	MPC · JPL
503491	2016 EH_{188}	—	October 28, 2014	Haleakala	Pan-STARRS 1	·	1.1 km	MPC · JPL
503492	2016 EM_{188}	—	January 26, 2012	Mount Lemmon	Mount Lemmon Survey	PHO	700 m	MPC · JPL
503493	2016 EP_{191}	—	January 18, 2009	Mount Lemmon	Mount Lemmon Survey	PHO	900 m	MPC · JPL
503494	2016 EY_{191}	—	March 4, 2011	Kitt Peak	Spacewatch	·	2.3 km	MPC · JPL
503495	2016 EC_{192}	—	October 31, 2014	Kitt Peak	Spacewatch	V	590 m	MPC · JPL
503496	2016 EK_{192}	—	January 20, 2008	Mount Lemmon	Mount Lemmon Survey	H	330 m	MPC · JPL
503497	2016 EC_{196}	—	August 25, 2014	Haleakala	Pan-STARRS 1	·	1.0 km	MPC · JPL
503498	2016 EO_{196}	—	March 3, 2009	Catalina	CSS	·	700 m	MPC · JPL
503499	2016 EX_{198}	—	July 13, 2013	Haleakala	Pan-STARRS 1	NYS	1.1 km	MPC · JPL
503500	2016 EJ_{199}	—	September 29, 2014	Haleakala	Pan-STARRS 1	·	680 m	MPC · JPL

== 503501–503600 ==
back to top

Designation			Discovery			Properties		Ref
Permanent	Provisional	Named after	Date	Site	Discoverer(s)	Category	Diam.	Ref
503501	2016 EX_{200}	—	March 24, 2012	Kitt Peak	Spacewatch	·	1.3 km	MPC · JPL
503502	2016 EG_{201}	—	July 5, 2010	Mount Lemmon	Mount Lemmon Survey	·	610 m	MPC · JPL
503503	2016 EH_{201}	—	January 26, 2012	Mount Lemmon	Mount Lemmon Survey	·	970 m	MPC · JPL
503504	2016 ER_{202}	—	June 29, 2014	Haleakala	Pan-STARRS 1	H	550 m	MPC · JPL
503505	2016 ES_{202}	—	January 17, 2005	Kitt Peak	Spacewatch	PHO	2.5 km	MPC · JPL
503506	2016 FP	—	September 18, 2014	Haleakala	Pan-STARRS 1	·	490 m	MPC · JPL
503507	2016 FK_{1}	—	October 28, 2010	Mount Lemmon	Mount Lemmon Survey	·	740 m	MPC · JPL
503508	2016 FO_{1}	—	February 26, 2011	Kitt Peak	Spacewatch	H	380 m	MPC · JPL
503509	2016 FQ_{3}	—	September 27, 2006	Catalina	CSS	H	730 m	MPC · JPL
503510	2016 FE_{4}	—	March 16, 2007	Mount Lemmon	Mount Lemmon Survey	·	1.5 km	MPC · JPL
503511	2016 FL_{4}	—	March 11, 2007	Kitt Peak	Spacewatch	·	1.8 km	MPC · JPL
503512	2016 FD_{5}	—	March 4, 2005	Mount Lemmon	Mount Lemmon Survey	MAS	580 m	MPC · JPL
503513	2016 FJ_{5}	—	October 2, 2003	Kitt Peak	Spacewatch	·	2.2 km	MPC · JPL
503514	2016 FY_{6}	—	January 30, 2009	Catalina	CSS	PHO	3.3 km	MPC · JPL
503515	2016 FN_{7}	—	November 11, 2004	Kitt Peak	Spacewatch	·	2.9 km	MPC · JPL
503516	2016 FW_{8}	—	January 30, 2012	Mount Lemmon	Mount Lemmon Survey	·	1.3 km	MPC · JPL
503517	2016 FE_{9}	—	August 20, 2006	Palomar	NEAT	·	1.3 km	MPC · JPL
503518	2016 FK_{9}	—	January 11, 2008	Mount Lemmon	Mount Lemmon Survey	·	1.0 km	MPC · JPL
503519	2016 FO_{9}	—	March 9, 2011	Mount Lemmon	Mount Lemmon Survey	·	2.0 km	MPC · JPL
503520	2016 FZ_{9}	—	September 10, 2007	Mount Lemmon	Mount Lemmon Survey	·	2.5 km	MPC · JPL
503521	2016 FB_{11}	—	January 6, 2010	Kitt Peak	Spacewatch	·	3.0 km	MPC · JPL
503522	2016 FT_{11}	—	January 15, 2005	Kitt Peak	Spacewatch	·	900 m	MPC · JPL
503523	2016 FN_{12}	—	September 19, 2003	Socorro	LINEAR	H	550 m	MPC · JPL
503524	2016 FW_{15}	—	May 24, 2006	Kitt Peak	Spacewatch	·	1.5 km	MPC · JPL
503525	2016 FV_{16}	—	May 1, 2011	Haleakala	Pan-STARRS 1	VER	2.2 km	MPC · JPL
503526	2016 FL_{17}	—	September 17, 2009	Kitt Peak	Spacewatch	·	1.1 km	MPC · JPL
503527	2016 FM_{17}	—	February 10, 2010	Kitt Peak	Spacewatch	HYG	2.7 km	MPC · JPL
503528	2016 FO_{17}	—	December 21, 2008	Mount Lemmon	Mount Lemmon Survey	·	2.9 km	MPC · JPL
503529	2016 FG_{20}	—	August 8, 2004	Socorro	LINEAR	·	1.5 km	MPC · JPL
503530	2016 FN_{20}	—	March 12, 2007	Mount Lemmon	Mount Lemmon Survey	·	1.6 km	MPC · JPL
503531	2016 FF_{21}	—	April 20, 2007	Kitt Peak	Spacewatch	·	2.3 km	MPC · JPL
503532	2016 FJ_{21}	—	January 13, 2011	Mount Lemmon	Mount Lemmon Survey	·	1.2 km	MPC · JPL
503533	2016 FL_{21}	—	April 27, 2011	Kitt Peak	Spacewatch	·	2.4 km	MPC · JPL
503534	2016 FN_{21}	—	January 11, 2008	Kitt Peak	Spacewatch	V	690 m	MPC · JPL
503535	2016 FL_{24}	—	October 15, 2007	Kitt Peak	Spacewatch	·	630 m	MPC · JPL
503536	2016 FN_{24}	—	April 24, 2009	Mount Lemmon	Mount Lemmon Survey	·	830 m	MPC · JPL
503537	2016 FL_{25}	—	April 11, 2005	Mount Lemmon	Mount Lemmon Survey	MAS	860 m	MPC · JPL
503538	2016 FP_{25}	—	October 28, 2010	Catalina	CSS	NYS	1.0 km	MPC · JPL
503539	2016 FD_{27}	—	March 26, 2007	Mount Lemmon	Mount Lemmon Survey	·	1.9 km	MPC · JPL
503540	2016 FK_{27}	—	September 10, 2004	Kitt Peak	Spacewatch	·	1.4 km	MPC · JPL
503541	2016 FF_{29}	—	April 18, 2009	Mount Lemmon	Mount Lemmon Survey	·	600 m	MPC · JPL
503542	2016 FN_{30}	—	January 23, 2006	Mount Lemmon	Mount Lemmon Survey	HOF	2.2 km	MPC · JPL
503543	2016 FD_{31}	—	January 27, 2011	Mount Lemmon	Mount Lemmon Survey	·	1.3 km	MPC · JPL
503544	2016 FL_{31}	—	April 15, 2008	Mount Lemmon	Mount Lemmon Survey	·	1.4 km	MPC · JPL
503545	2016 FQ_{34}	—	October 8, 2004	Kitt Peak	Spacewatch	·	1.5 km	MPC · JPL
503546	2016 FC_{35}	—	October 6, 2004	Kitt Peak	Spacewatch	·	1.7 km	MPC · JPL
503547	2016 FS_{36}	—	April 15, 2007	Kitt Peak	Spacewatch	DOR	2.2 km	MPC · JPL
503548	2016 FW_{36}	—	October 12, 1998	Kitt Peak	Spacewatch	MAS	950 m	MPC · JPL
503549	2016 FL_{41}	—	June 10, 2012	Haleakala	Pan-STARRS 1	·	1.9 km	MPC · JPL
503550	2016 FM_{41}	—	December 1, 2014	Haleakala	Pan-STARRS 1	TIR	3.0 km	MPC · JPL
503551	2016 FN_{42}	—	November 15, 2011	Kitt Peak	Spacewatch	·	790 m	MPC · JPL
503552	2016 FB_{43}	—	February 26, 2007	Mount Lemmon	Mount Lemmon Survey	PAD	2.3 km	MPC · JPL
503553	2016 FF_{43}	—	April 13, 2013	Haleakala	Pan-STARRS 1	·	640 m	MPC · JPL
503554	2016 FP_{46}	—	September 10, 2010	Kitt Peak	Spacewatch	·	1.2 km	MPC · JPL
503555	2016 FR_{47}	—	November 17, 2009	Mount Lemmon	Mount Lemmon Survey	·	1.5 km	MPC · JPL
503556	2016 FE_{48}	—	April 18, 2009	Mount Lemmon	Mount Lemmon Survey	NYS	660 m	MPC · JPL
503557	2016 FM_{48}	—	February 9, 2005	Mount Lemmon	Mount Lemmon Survey	·	2.1 km	MPC · JPL
503558	2016 FO_{48}	—	March 2, 2009	Kitt Peak	Spacewatch	·	630 m	MPC · JPL
503559	2016 FT_{49}	—	September 18, 2006	Catalina	CSS	·	1.3 km	MPC · JPL
503560	2016 FV_{51}	—	December 28, 2005	Kitt Peak	Spacewatch	·	1.4 km	MPC · JPL
503561	2016 FT_{52}	—	November 13, 2006	Kitt Peak	Spacewatch	·	1.1 km	MPC · JPL
503562	2016 FP_{54}	—	August 12, 2008	La Sagra	OAM	·	2.5 km	MPC · JPL
503563	2016 FJ_{56}	—	April 29, 2012	Kitt Peak	Spacewatch	·	1.3 km	MPC · JPL
503564	2016 FH_{57}	—	November 26, 2011	Kitt Peak	Spacewatch	·	720 m	MPC · JPL
503565	2016 FT_{57}	—	October 13, 2005	Kitt Peak	Spacewatch	·	1.4 km	MPC · JPL
503566	2016 GO_{5}	—	October 2, 2008	Mount Lemmon	Mount Lemmon Survey	TIR	2.0 km	MPC · JPL
503567	2016 GZ_{6}	—	June 30, 2008	Kitt Peak	Spacewatch	·	1.9 km	MPC · JPL
503568	2016 GL_{9}	—	October 8, 2008	Kitt Peak	Spacewatch	KOR	1.4 km	MPC · JPL
503569	2016 GU_{9}	—	July 14, 2013	Haleakala	Pan-STARRS 1	·	950 m	MPC · JPL
503570	2016 GK_{11}	—	January 31, 2009	Kitt Peak	Spacewatch	V	560 m	MPC · JPL
503571	2016 GX_{11}	—	March 23, 2003	Kitt Peak	Spacewatch	·	1.2 km	MPC · JPL
503572	2016 GC_{14}	—	October 12, 2010	Mount Lemmon	Mount Lemmon Survey	·	1.1 km	MPC · JPL
503573	2016 GD_{20}	—	August 30, 2005	Kitt Peak	Spacewatch	(5)	1.1 km	MPC · JPL
503574	2016 GN_{29}	—	September 29, 2005	Mount Lemmon	Mount Lemmon Survey	·	1.2 km	MPC · JPL
503575	2016 GL_{33}	—	February 23, 2007	Kitt Peak	Spacewatch	·	1.4 km	MPC · JPL
503576	2016 GP_{34}	—	September 17, 2006	Kitt Peak	Spacewatch	·	850 m	MPC · JPL
503577	2016 GN_{39}	—	November 2, 2007	Mount Lemmon	Mount Lemmon Survey	·	640 m	MPC · JPL
503578	2016 GS_{48}	—	April 30, 2011	Mount Lemmon	Mount Lemmon Survey	·	1.8 km	MPC · JPL
503579	2016 GY_{49}	—	March 12, 2005	Kitt Peak	Spacewatch	·	3.0 km	MPC · JPL
503580	2016 GV_{50}	—	October 16, 2003	Kitt Peak	Spacewatch	(2076)	740 m	MPC · JPL
503581	2016 GF_{51}	—	April 12, 2008	Kitt Peak	Spacewatch	·	1.1 km	MPC · JPL
503582	2016 GY_{51}	—	August 20, 2003	Campo Imperatore	CINEOS	·	790 m	MPC · JPL
503583	2016 GD_{53}	—	April 29, 2008	Mount Lemmon	Mount Lemmon Survey	·	1.1 km	MPC · JPL
503584	2016 GY_{54}	—	April 13, 2004	Kitt Peak	Spacewatch	·	1.1 km	MPC · JPL
503585	2016 GX_{55}	—	September 10, 2007	Kitt Peak	Spacewatch	·	580 m	MPC · JPL
503586	2016 GY_{56}	—	September 17, 1995	Kitt Peak	Spacewatch	THM	2.4 km	MPC · JPL
503587	2016 GB_{57}	—	December 22, 2005	Kitt Peak	Spacewatch	·	1.6 km	MPC · JPL
503588	2016 GN_{59}	—	November 22, 2014	Mount Lemmon	Mount Lemmon Survey	·	800 m	MPC · JPL
503589	2016 GO_{64}	—	March 16, 2009	Kitt Peak	Spacewatch	·	650 m	MPC · JPL
503590	2016 GZ_{64}	—	July 6, 2005	Kitt Peak	Spacewatch	·	1.2 km	MPC · JPL
503591	2016 GF_{65}	—	September 26, 2006	Mount Lemmon	Mount Lemmon Survey	·	980 m	MPC · JPL
503592	2016 GT_{65}	—	January 15, 2008	Mount Lemmon	Mount Lemmon Survey	NYS	950 m	MPC · JPL
503593	2016 GF_{66}	—	December 26, 2014	Haleakala	Pan-STARRS 1	·	1.9 km	MPC · JPL
503594	2016 GC_{68}	—	December 30, 2005	Kitt Peak	Spacewatch	AEO	1.2 km	MPC · JPL
503595	2016 GH_{70}	—	April 21, 2012	Mount Lemmon	Mount Lemmon Survey	WIT	890 m	MPC · JPL
503596	2016 GS_{71}	—	September 18, 2006	Kitt Peak	Spacewatch	·	790 m	MPC · JPL
503597	2016 GC_{75}	—	March 13, 2007	Mount Lemmon	Mount Lemmon Survey	AEO	1.1 km	MPC · JPL
503598	2016 GA_{78}	—	October 6, 2013	Kitt Peak	Spacewatch	·	1.3 km	MPC · JPL
503599	2016 GQ_{78}	—	October 27, 2009	Kitt Peak	Spacewatch	·	1.3 km	MPC · JPL
503600	2016 GY_{87}	—	January 10, 2007	Kitt Peak	Spacewatch	·	1.4 km	MPC · JPL

== 503601–503700 ==
back to top

Designation			Discovery			Properties		Ref
Permanent	Provisional	Named after	Date	Site	Discoverer(s)	Category	Diam.	Ref
503601	2016 GQ_{91}	—	April 25, 2007	Kitt Peak	Spacewatch	·	2.2 km	MPC · JPL
503602	2016 GA_{93}	—	September 25, 2013	Catalina	CSS	·	1.7 km	MPC · JPL
503603	2016 GT_{93}	—	January 18, 2012	Mount Lemmon	Mount Lemmon Survey	·	1.0 km	MPC · JPL
503604	2016 GQ_{95}	—	May 29, 2011	Mount Lemmon	Mount Lemmon Survey	EOS	1.7 km	MPC · JPL
503605	2016 GP_{96}	—	February 25, 2011	Mount Lemmon	Mount Lemmon Survey	·	1.3 km	MPC · JPL
503606	2016 GX_{98}	—	March 5, 2002	Kitt Peak	Spacewatch	·	1.5 km	MPC · JPL
503607	2016 GG_{101}	—	July 16, 2013	Haleakala	Pan-STARRS 1	·	1.2 km	MPC · JPL
503608	2016 GZ_{107}	—	April 22, 2007	Mount Lemmon	Mount Lemmon Survey	·	1.3 km	MPC · JPL
503609	2016 GK_{108}	—	May 7, 2005	Mount Lemmon	Mount Lemmon Survey	THM	2.2 km	MPC · JPL
503610	2016 GZ_{108}	—	April 14, 2007	Kitt Peak	Spacewatch	·	2.0 km	MPC · JPL
503611	2016 GN_{109}	—	November 25, 2005	Mount Lemmon	Mount Lemmon Survey	·	1.4 km	MPC · JPL
503612	2016 GF_{111}	—	April 10, 2005	Mount Lemmon	Mount Lemmon Survey	MAS	770 m	MPC · JPL
503613	2016 GH_{124}	—	March 14, 2007	Mount Lemmon	Mount Lemmon Survey	·	1.8 km	MPC · JPL
503614	2016 GT_{125}	—	February 15, 2010	Mount Lemmon	Mount Lemmon Survey	·	2.4 km	MPC · JPL
503615	2016 GC_{126}	—	October 10, 2004	Kitt Peak	Spacewatch	·	630 m	MPC · JPL
503616	2016 GM_{126}	—	March 3, 2005	Kitt Peak	Spacewatch	·	1.2 km	MPC · JPL
503617	2016 GU_{127}	—	February 27, 2009	Kitt Peak	Spacewatch	·	540 m	MPC · JPL
503618	2016 GN_{128}	—	December 30, 2005	Kitt Peak	Spacewatch	·	2.0 km	MPC · JPL
503619	2016 GP_{128}	—	October 7, 2007	Kitt Peak	Spacewatch	·	2.8 km	MPC · JPL
503620	2016 GY_{129}	—	March 4, 2005	Kitt Peak	Spacewatch	MAS	630 m	MPC · JPL
503621	2016 GL_{130}	—	August 21, 2006	Kitt Peak	Spacewatch	·	700 m	MPC · JPL
503622	2016 GS_{130}	—	December 13, 2010	Mount Lemmon	Mount Lemmon Survey	·	1.3 km	MPC · JPL
503623	2016 GK_{132}	—	January 2, 2012	Mount Lemmon	Mount Lemmon Survey	V	540 m	MPC · JPL
503624	2016 GD_{133}	—	March 3, 2005	Catalina	CSS	NYS	880 m	MPC · JPL
503625	2016 GO_{135}	—	August 23, 1998	Xinglong	SCAP	H	530 m	MPC · JPL
503626	2016 GV_{135}	—	October 10, 2010	Mount Lemmon	Mount Lemmon Survey	·	1.6 km	MPC · JPL
503627	2016 GE_{138}	—	March 16, 2007	Mount Lemmon	Mount Lemmon Survey	·	1.4 km	MPC · JPL
503628	2016 GU_{140}	—	March 7, 2011	Piszkéstető	K. Sárneczky, Kelemen, J.	·	1.5 km	MPC · JPL
503629	2016 GB_{145}	—	January 17, 2007	Catalina	CSS	EUN	1.3 km	MPC · JPL
503630	2016 GX_{146}	—	October 21, 2003	Kitt Peak	Spacewatch	V	570 m	MPC · JPL
503631	2016 GC_{147}	—	October 5, 2014	Mount Lemmon	Mount Lemmon Survey	·	520 m	MPC · JPL
503632	2016 GA_{166}	—	April 30, 2005	Kitt Peak	Spacewatch	MAS	700 m	MPC · JPL
503633	2016 GL_{169}	—	April 15, 2007	Kitt Peak	Spacewatch	·	1.9 km	MPC · JPL
503634	2016 GR_{169}	—	November 9, 2013	Haleakala	Pan-STARRS 1	·	3.2 km	MPC · JPL
503635	2016 GW_{170}	—	March 4, 2008	Kitt Peak	Spacewatch	·	1.5 km	MPC · JPL
503636	2016 GX_{170}	—	April 24, 2012	Haleakala	Pan-STARRS 1	·	1.2 km	MPC · JPL
503637	2016 GV_{172}	—	March 13, 2007	Mount Lemmon	Mount Lemmon Survey	·	2.1 km	MPC · JPL
503638	2016 GF_{173}	—	May 20, 2006	Mount Lemmon	Mount Lemmon Survey	·	930 m	MPC · JPL
503639	2016 GP_{173}	—	April 6, 2008	Kitt Peak	Spacewatch	·	850 m	MPC · JPL
503640	2016 GU_{174}	—	May 3, 2005	Kitt Peak	Spacewatch	·	2.0 km	MPC · JPL
503641	2016 GC_{178}	—	January 16, 2015	Haleakala	Pan-STARRS 1	·	1.3 km	MPC · JPL
503642	2016 GW_{178}	—	March 27, 2011	Mount Lemmon	Mount Lemmon Survey	·	1.7 km	MPC · JPL
503643	2016 GQ_{182}	—	February 14, 2010	Kitt Peak	Spacewatch	EOS	2.0 km	MPC · JPL
503644	2016 GU_{188}	—	June 4, 2011	Mount Lemmon	Mount Lemmon Survey	·	2.1 km	MPC · JPL
503645	2016 GO_{189}	—	June 22, 1995	Kitt Peak	Spacewatch	·	1.7 km	MPC · JPL
503646	2016 GQ_{189}	—	February 28, 2009	Mount Lemmon	Mount Lemmon Survey	·	580 m	MPC · JPL
503647	2016 GE_{190}	—	September 7, 2008	Mount Lemmon	Mount Lemmon Survey	·	1.6 km	MPC · JPL
503648	2016 GG_{191}	—	March 26, 2011	Mount Lemmon	Mount Lemmon Survey	·	1.7 km	MPC · JPL
503649	2016 GX_{191}	—	January 26, 2011	Kitt Peak	Spacewatch	·	1.7 km	MPC · JPL
503650	2016 GM_{192}	—	September 19, 2010	Kitt Peak	Spacewatch	·	980 m	MPC · JPL
503651	2016 GJ_{200}	—	November 3, 2010	Mount Lemmon	Mount Lemmon Survey	·	1.3 km	MPC · JPL
503652	2016 GU_{204}	—	May 16, 2012	Kitt Peak	Spacewatch	MAR	1.0 km	MPC · JPL
503653	2016 GV_{205}	—	March 1, 2005	Kitt Peak	Spacewatch	·	1.2 km	MPC · JPL
503654	2016 GU_{207}	—	March 7, 2008	Mount Lemmon	Mount Lemmon Survey	·	1.3 km	MPC · JPL
503655	2016 GW_{207}	—	March 15, 2010	Mount Lemmon	Mount Lemmon Survey	·	3.4 km	MPC · JPL
503656	2016 GC_{218}	—	November 9, 2009	Mount Lemmon	Mount Lemmon Survey	·	2.3 km	MPC · JPL
503657	2016 GO_{219}	—	August 18, 2004	Siding Spring	SSS	·	2.5 km	MPC · JPL
503658	2016 GT_{222}	—	May 18, 2007	Kitt Peak	Spacewatch	·	1.5 km	MPC · JPL
503659	2016 GV_{222}	—	July 25, 2011	Haleakala	Pan-STARRS 1	·	2.7 km	MPC · JPL
503660	2016 GZ_{232}	—	January 31, 2009	Mount Lemmon	Mount Lemmon Survey	·	630 m	MPC · JPL
503661	2016 GR_{237}	—	November 18, 2003	Kitt Peak	Spacewatch	·	2.0 km	MPC · JPL
503662	2016 GH_{240}	—	July 10, 2010	WISE	WISE	T_{j} (2.97)	3.0 km	MPC · JPL
503663	2016 GG_{242}	—	January 31, 2006	Mount Lemmon	Mount Lemmon Survey	·	750 m	MPC · JPL
503664	2016 GB_{245}	—	May 14, 2004	Kitt Peak	Spacewatch	·	920 m	MPC · JPL
503665	2016 GE_{245}	—	October 7, 2004	Kitt Peak	Spacewatch	·	1.9 km	MPC · JPL
503666	2016 GP_{245}	—	February 2, 2005	Kitt Peak	Spacewatch	·	1.9 km	MPC · JPL
503667	2016 GH_{246}	—	December 21, 2006	Kitt Peak	Spacewatch	·	1.2 km	MPC · JPL
503668	2016 GW_{246}	—	November 26, 2005	Mount Lemmon	Mount Lemmon Survey	·	1.2 km	MPC · JPL
503669	2016 GW_{248}	—	October 27, 2006	Mount Lemmon	Mount Lemmon Survey	MAS	580 m	MPC · JPL
503670	2016 HY	—	November 25, 2009	Kitt Peak	Spacewatch	·	2.0 km	MPC · JPL
503671	2016 HA_{1}	—	March 24, 2003	Kitt Peak	Spacewatch	ADE	2.7 km	MPC · JPL
503672	2016 HZ_{1}	—	October 2, 2013	Haleakala	Pan-STARRS 1	·	1.0 km	MPC · JPL
503673	2016 HX_{2}	—	January 4, 2011	Mount Lemmon	Mount Lemmon Survey	BRG	1.5 km	MPC · JPL
503674	2016 HH_{3}	—	May 30, 2011	Haleakala	Pan-STARRS 1	H	650 m	MPC · JPL
503675	2016 HM_{5}	—	May 19, 2012	Mount Lemmon	Mount Lemmon Survey	MAR	870 m	MPC · JPL
503676	2016 HH_{6}	—	April 9, 2010	Mount Lemmon	Mount Lemmon Survey	·	2.5 km	MPC · JPL
503677	2016 HZ_{6}	—	February 13, 2011	Mount Lemmon	Mount Lemmon Survey	·	1.4 km	MPC · JPL
503678	2016 HR_{7}	—	May 13, 2010	Mount Lemmon	Mount Lemmon Survey	URS	4.0 km	MPC · JPL
503679	2016 HZ_{7}	—	September 16, 2003	Kitt Peak	Spacewatch	·	1.6 km	MPC · JPL
503680	2016 HH_{8}	—	September 28, 2009	Mount Lemmon	Mount Lemmon Survey	WIT	980 m	MPC · JPL
503681	2016 HL_{8}	—	May 11, 2005	Catalina	CSS	·	3.8 km	MPC · JPL
503682	2016 HY_{8}	—	February 13, 2008	Catalina	CSS	·	1.8 km	MPC · JPL
503683	2016 HS_{9}	—	May 15, 2005	Mount Lemmon	Mount Lemmon Survey	LIX	3.3 km	MPC · JPL
503684	2016 HZ_{9}	—	September 6, 2014	Mount Lemmon	Mount Lemmon Survey	·	870 m	MPC · JPL
503685	2016 HL_{10}	—	October 12, 2007	Catalina	CSS	·	4.1 km	MPC · JPL
503686	2016 HS_{10}	—	January 16, 2011	Mount Lemmon	Mount Lemmon Survey	·	1.7 km	MPC · JPL
503687	2016 HK_{15}	—	November 8, 2013	Mount Lemmon	Mount Lemmon Survey	·	1.4 km	MPC · JPL
503688	2016 HW_{17}	—	November 9, 2013	Mount Lemmon	Mount Lemmon Survey	·	1.5 km	MPC · JPL
503689	2016 HR_{18}	—	December 21, 2014	Haleakala	Pan-STARRS 1	KOR	1.1 km	MPC · JPL
503690	2016 HH_{20}	—	October 11, 2007	Mount Lemmon	Mount Lemmon Survey	·	580 m	MPC · JPL
503691	2016 HD_{22}	—	October 18, 2007	Mount Lemmon	Mount Lemmon Survey	·	570 m	MPC · JPL
503692	2016 JM_{2}	—	April 27, 2000	Kitt Peak	Spacewatch	EOS	2.0 km	MPC · JPL
503693	2016 JG_{4}	—	October 18, 2009	Mount Lemmon	Mount Lemmon Survey	·	1.5 km	MPC · JPL
503694	2016 JJ_{4}	—	April 25, 2003	Kitt Peak	Spacewatch	·	1.8 km	MPC · JPL
503695	2016 JP_{6}	—	May 26, 2010	WISE	WISE	T_{j} (2.98) · EUP	3.8 km	MPC · JPL
503696	2016 JB_{7}	—	December 11, 2014	Mount Lemmon	Mount Lemmon Survey	·	1.6 km	MPC · JPL
503697	2016 JF_{9}	—	April 15, 2007	Kitt Peak	Spacewatch	WIT	920 m	MPC · JPL
503698	2016 JL_{9}	—	January 25, 2006	Kitt Peak	Spacewatch	·	1.6 km	MPC · JPL
503699	2016 JU_{10}	—	July 14, 2013	Haleakala	Pan-STARRS 1	·	750 m	MPC · JPL
503700	2016 JV_{10}	—	October 4, 2012	Mount Lemmon	Mount Lemmon Survey	EOS	2.0 km	MPC · JPL

== 503701–503800 ==
back to top

Designation			Discovery			Properties		Ref
Permanent	Provisional	Named after	Date	Site	Discoverer(s)	Category	Diam.	Ref
503701	2016 JF_{11}	—	November 27, 2013	Haleakala	Pan-STARRS 1	·	2.5 km	MPC · JPL
503702	2016 JP_{11}	—	December 22, 2008	Kitt Peak	Spacewatch	·	2.8 km	MPC · JPL
503703	2016 JO_{12}	—	February 5, 2010	WISE	WISE	·	3.2 km	MPC · JPL
503704	2016 JE_{14}	—	October 2, 2013	Haleakala	Pan-STARRS 1	·	1.9 km	MPC · JPL
503705	2016 JD_{15}	—	August 27, 2006	Kitt Peak	Spacewatch	·	2.6 km	MPC · JPL
503706	2016 JJ_{15}	—	January 12, 2016	Haleakala	Pan-STARRS 1	·	1.4 km	MPC · JPL
503707	2016 JL_{16}	—	January 21, 2015	Mount Lemmon	Mount Lemmon Survey	·	2.9 km	MPC · JPL
503708	2016 JU_{16}	—	January 17, 2015	Haleakala	Pan-STARRS 1	·	1.3 km	MPC · JPL
503709	2016 JZ_{19}	—	November 21, 2006	Mount Lemmon	Mount Lemmon Survey	·	1.4 km	MPC · JPL
503710	2016 JB_{20}	—	February 16, 2001	Kitt Peak	Spacewatch	·	2.2 km	MPC · JPL
503711	2016 JU_{20}	—	October 11, 2007	Mount Lemmon	Mount Lemmon Survey	·	2.5 km	MPC · JPL
503712	2016 JL_{21}	—	April 12, 2005	Kitt Peak	Spacewatch	EOS	1.9 km	MPC · JPL
503713	2016 JO_{21}	—	April 12, 2005	Kitt Peak	Spacewatch	·	1.0 km	MPC · JPL
503714	2016 JE_{23}	—	September 27, 2005	Kitt Peak	Spacewatch	CYB	3.0 km	MPC · JPL
503715	2016 JH_{23}	—	September 19, 2010	Kitt Peak	Spacewatch	V	600 m	MPC · JPL
503716	2016 JE_{25}	—	January 23, 2006	Kitt Peak	Spacewatch	AGN	1.3 km	MPC · JPL
503717	2016 JY_{25}	—	July 13, 2013	Haleakala	Pan-STARRS 1	·	590 m	MPC · JPL
503718	2016 JT_{27}	—	April 5, 2010	Kitt Peak	Spacewatch	·	3.7 km	MPC · JPL
503719	2016 JY_{27}	—	February 14, 2010	Kitt Peak	Spacewatch	·	2.0 km	MPC · JPL
503720	2016 JP_{28}	—	February 10, 2011	Mount Lemmon	Mount Lemmon Survey	·	1.4 km	MPC · JPL
503721	2016 JN_{30}	—	March 21, 2002	Campo Imperatore	CINEOS	DOR	2.5 km	MPC · JPL
503722	2016 JG_{33}	—	February 16, 2004	Kitt Peak	Spacewatch	·	3.8 km	MPC · JPL
503723	2016 JL_{35}	—	October 7, 2004	Kitt Peak	Spacewatch	EUN	1.3 km	MPC · JPL
503724	2016 JP_{36}	—	May 15, 2012	Haleakala	Pan-STARRS 1	·	1.6 km	MPC · JPL
503725	2016 JB_{37}	—	September 12, 2007	Catalina	CSS	EOS	2.3 km	MPC · JPL
503726	2016 JV_{38}	—	March 25, 2007	Mount Lemmon	Mount Lemmon Survey	EUN	1.9 km	MPC · JPL
503727	2016 KO_{2}	—	August 25, 2004	Kitt Peak	Spacewatch	·	1.5 km	MPC · JPL
503728	2016 LR_{3}	—	January 13, 2010	Kitt Peak	Spacewatch	·	4.3 km	MPC · JPL
503729	2016 LE_{5}	—	January 16, 2015	Haleakala	Pan-STARRS 1	·	2.3 km	MPC · JPL
503730	2016 LF_{5}	—	April 20, 2010	Mount Lemmon	Mount Lemmon Survey	·	2.5 km	MPC · JPL
503731	2016 LM_{7}	—	February 13, 2011	Mount Lemmon	Mount Lemmon Survey	·	1.7 km	MPC · JPL
503732	2016 LV_{16}	—	June 12, 2010	WISE	WISE	EOS	3.2 km	MPC · JPL
503733	2016 LT_{20}	—	February 9, 2010	Kitt Peak	Spacewatch	·	1.9 km	MPC · JPL
503734	2016 LV_{21}	—	April 14, 1999	Kitt Peak	Spacewatch	·	2.5 km	MPC · JPL
503735	2016 LG_{24}	—	April 9, 2010	Mount Lemmon	Mount Lemmon Survey	·	2.4 km	MPC · JPL
503736	2016 LH_{24}	—	April 20, 2006	Kitt Peak	Spacewatch	·	2.1 km	MPC · JPL
503737	2016 LQ_{24}	—	January 25, 2009	Kitt Peak	Spacewatch	·	2.6 km	MPC · JPL
503738	2016 LJ_{25}	—	November 1, 1999	Kitt Peak	Spacewatch	·	1.9 km	MPC · JPL
503739	2016 LU_{25}	—	September 20, 1995	Kitt Peak	Spacewatch	·	1.3 km	MPC · JPL
503740	2016 LU_{27}	—	May 2, 2005	Kitt Peak	Spacewatch	·	3.0 km	MPC · JPL
503741	2016 LU_{28}	—	November 26, 2003	Kitt Peak	Spacewatch	V	640 m	MPC · JPL
503742	2016 LD_{31}	—	November 5, 2007	Mount Lemmon	Mount Lemmon Survey	·	2.6 km	MPC · JPL
503743	2016 LN_{31}	—	September 10, 2004	Kitt Peak	Spacewatch	·	1.5 km	MPC · JPL
503744	2016 LU_{34}	—	November 27, 2013	Haleakala	Pan-STARRS 1	·	1.8 km	MPC · JPL
503745	2016 LY_{36}	—	September 14, 2006	Kitt Peak	Spacewatch	·	2.9 km	MPC · JPL
503746	2016 LY_{41}	—	December 31, 2007	Mount Lemmon	Mount Lemmon Survey	·	980 m	MPC · JPL
503747	2016 LV_{43}	—	January 25, 2009	Kitt Peak	Spacewatch	·	3.1 km	MPC · JPL
503748	2016 LQ_{47}	—	March 26, 2011	Haleakala	Pan-STARRS 1	·	2.8 km	MPC · JPL
503749	2016 MM_{1}	—	January 18, 2010	WISE	WISE	·	2.5 km	MPC · JPL
503750	2016 MJ_{2}	—	October 6, 2008	Catalina	CSS	·	1.8 km	MPC · JPL
503751	2016 MW_{2}	—	April 11, 2007	Catalina	CSS	JUN	1.1 km	MPC · JPL
503752	2016 MZ_{2}	—	April 6, 2005	Mount Lemmon	Mount Lemmon Survey	·	1.9 km	MPC · JPL
503753	2016 NP_{2}	—	December 22, 2005	Kitt Peak	Spacewatch	·	2.0 km	MPC · JPL
503754	2016 NY_{2}	—	February 5, 2006	Mount Lemmon	Mount Lemmon Survey	HNS	1.1 km	MPC · JPL
503755	2016 ND_{3}	—	October 17, 2001	Kitt Peak	Spacewatch	·	3.0 km	MPC · JPL
503756	2016 NN_{4}	—	January 2, 2009	Mount Lemmon	Mount Lemmon Survey	·	3.7 km	MPC · JPL
503757	2016 NQ_{4}	—	February 20, 2014	Haleakala	Pan-STARRS 1	·	3.5 km	MPC · JPL
503758	2016 NP_{11}	—	May 13, 2005	Kitt Peak	Spacewatch	·	1.6 km	MPC · JPL
503759	2016 NB_{20}	—	April 27, 2011	Kitt Peak	Spacewatch	BRA	1.5 km	MPC · JPL
503760	2016 NT_{23}	—	May 14, 2005	Kitt Peak	Spacewatch	·	1.9 km	MPC · JPL
503761	2016 NT_{53}	—	February 10, 2008	Mount Lemmon	Mount Lemmon Survey	·	2.8 km	MPC · JPL
503762	2016 OS_{4}	—	December 28, 2013	Kitt Peak	Spacewatch	·	3.0 km	MPC · JPL
503763	2016 PS_{9}	—	December 30, 2007	Kitt Peak	Spacewatch	·	3.2 km	MPC · JPL
503764	2016 PZ_{12}	—	December 30, 2000	Socorro	LINEAR	·	1.6 km	MPC · JPL
503765	2016 PE_{37}	—	November 2, 2007	Mount Lemmon	Mount Lemmon Survey	·	4.0 km	MPC · JPL
503766	2016 PX_{67}	—	September 28, 2011	Mount Lemmon	Mount Lemmon Survey	EOS	1.8 km	MPC · JPL
503767	2016 PC_{68}	—	April 30, 2009	Kitt Peak	Spacewatch	ELF	3.9 km	MPC · JPL
503768	2016 PH_{74}	—	September 27, 2011	Mount Lemmon	Mount Lemmon Survey	·	2.5 km	MPC · JPL
503769	2016 QA_{10}	—	March 14, 2013	Catalina	CSS	3:2	6.6 km	MPC · JPL
503770	2016 QB_{29}	—	November 5, 2007	Mount Lemmon	Mount Lemmon Survey	·	2.1 km	MPC · JPL
503771	2016 QX_{31}	—	June 6, 2011	Haleakala	Pan-STARRS 1	·	1.2 km	MPC · JPL
503772	2016 QQ_{36}	—	July 28, 2008	Mount Lemmon	Mount Lemmon Survey	T_{j} (2.99) · 3:2	4.6 km	MPC · JPL
503773	2016 QB_{43}	—	September 4, 2011	Haleakala	Pan-STARRS 1	·	2.5 km	MPC · JPL
503774	2016 QS_{47}	—	January 10, 2008	Kitt Peak	Spacewatch	·	3.2 km	MPC · JPL
503775	2016 QD_{55}	—	February 8, 2008	Mount Lemmon	Mount Lemmon Survey	·	3.2 km	MPC · JPL
503776	2016 QK_{57}	—	October 8, 2005	Kitt Peak	Spacewatch	·	2.6 km	MPC · JPL
503777	2016 QV_{65}	—	September 16, 2006	Kitt Peak	Spacewatch	·	1.8 km	MPC · JPL
503778	2016 QE_{66}	—	April 10, 2010	Kitt Peak	Spacewatch	·	2.7 km	MPC · JPL
503779	2016 QR_{67}	—	September 4, 2011	Haleakala	Pan-STARRS 1	·	3.0 km	MPC · JPL
503780	2016 QS_{67}	—	November 3, 2007	Mount Lemmon	Mount Lemmon Survey	·	4.1 km	MPC · JPL
503781	2016 QN_{68}	—	March 11, 2003	Kitt Peak	Spacewatch	HYG	2.7 km	MPC · JPL
503782	2016 RZ_{21}	—	February 1, 2009	Mount Lemmon	Mount Lemmon Survey	·	2.3 km	MPC · JPL
503783	2016 RA_{23}	—	January 31, 2009	Kitt Peak	Spacewatch	·	2.5 km	MPC · JPL
503784	2016 RD_{42}	—	October 1, 2005	Kitt Peak	Spacewatch	VER	3.6 km	MPC · JPL
503785	2016 UW_{67}	—	December 6, 2005	Kitt Peak	Spacewatch	LIX · fast	3.3 km	MPC · JPL
503786	2016 UJ_{146}	—	March 4, 2013	Haleakala	Pan-STARRS 1	·	2.9 km	MPC · JPL
503787	2016 WW_{6}	—	March 31, 2008	Kitt Peak	Spacewatch	·	2.2 km	MPC · JPL
503788	2016 WL_{25}	—	December 2, 2005	Kitt Peak	Spacewatch	·	4.0 km	MPC · JPL
503789	2016 XR_{21}	—	March 20, 2012	Haleakala	Pan-STARRS 1	H	440 m	MPC · JPL
503790	2016 YV_{7}	—	March 27, 2004	Socorro	LINEAR	H	560 m	MPC · JPL
503791	2016 YB_{10}	—	July 29, 2005	Siding Spring	SSS	H	630 m	MPC · JPL
503792	2017 AB_{15}	—	October 1, 2011	Kitt Peak	Spacewatch	·	1.7 km	MPC · JPL
503793	2017 BK_{4}	—	January 20, 2006	Catalina	CSS	H	650 m	MPC · JPL
503794	2017 BK_{12}	—	September 13, 2007	Catalina	CSS	H	500 m	MPC · JPL
503795	2017 BQ_{111}	—	July 31, 1997	Kitt Peak	Spacewatch	·	1.7 km	MPC · JPL
503796	2017 CW_{6}	—	February 26, 2008	Kitt Peak	Spacewatch	·	2.0 km	MPC · JPL
503797	2017 DT_{33}	—	June 16, 2010	WISE	WISE	ADE	2.6 km	MPC · JPL
503798	2017 DK_{35}	—	January 31, 2009	Kitt Peak	Spacewatch	H	510 m	MPC · JPL
503799	2017 EX_{11}	—	December 29, 2011	Mount Lemmon	Mount Lemmon Survey	·	1.4 km	MPC · JPL
503800	2017 FM_{55}	—	April 15, 2012	Haleakala	Pan-STARRS 1	·	3.1 km	MPC · JPL

== 503801–503900 ==
back to top

Designation			Discovery			Properties		Ref
Permanent	Provisional	Named after	Date	Site	Discoverer(s)	Category	Diam.	Ref
503801	2017 GA_{7}	—	May 21, 2006	Mount Lemmon	Mount Lemmon Survey	·	880 m	MPC · JPL
503802	2017 HR_{22}	—	May 22, 2006	Kitt Peak	Spacewatch	·	3.0 km	MPC · JPL
503803	2017 HW_{31}	—	January 3, 2016	Haleakala	Pan-STARRS 1	·	1.6 km	MPC · JPL
503804	2017 HB_{32}	—	February 28, 2008	Mount Lemmon	Mount Lemmon Survey	·	1.3 km	MPC · JPL
503805	2017 HU_{42}	—	January 14, 2016	Haleakala	Pan-STARRS 1	·	3.0 km	MPC · JPL
503806	2017 JP_{1}	—	March 26, 2006	Catalina	CSS	H	650 m	MPC · JPL
503807	2017 JO_{3}	—	January 9, 2011	Mount Lemmon	Mount Lemmon Survey	·	3.0 km	MPC · JPL
503808	2017 JB_{4}	—	January 8, 2010	Kitt Peak	Spacewatch	·	2.5 km	MPC · JPL
503809	2017 KU_{2}	—	January 19, 2008	Kitt Peak	Spacewatch	H	560 m	MPC · JPL
503810	2017 KL_{5}	—	September 6, 2012	Siding Spring	SSS	H	610 m	MPC · JPL
503811	2017 KV_{5}	—	April 20, 2004	Kitt Peak	Spacewatch	·	2.6 km	MPC · JPL
503812	2017 KZ_{8}	—	May 16, 2013	Mount Lemmon	Mount Lemmon Survey	·	1.2 km	MPC · JPL
503813	2017 KN_{10}	—	March 20, 2007	Kitt Peak	Spacewatch	615	1.3 km	MPC · JPL
503814	2017 KA_{12}	—	November 18, 2008	Kitt Peak	Spacewatch	·	3.0 km	MPC · JPL
503815	2017 KB_{12}	—	April 30, 2013	Mount Lemmon	Mount Lemmon Survey	·	1.1 km	MPC · JPL
503816	2017 KK_{12}	—	September 18, 2014	Haleakala	Pan-STARRS 1	·	1.4 km	MPC · JPL
503817	2017 KO_{12}	—	January 4, 2013	Mount Lemmon	Mount Lemmon Survey	·	720 m	MPC · JPL
503818	2017 KU_{12}	—	March 31, 2003	Kitt Peak	Spacewatch	·	790 m	MPC · JPL
503819	2017 KX_{15}	—	May 7, 2000	Socorro	LINEAR	·	3.6 km	MPC · JPL
503820	2017 KC_{16}	—	April 6, 2010	WISE	WISE	T_{j} (2.96)	3.7 km	MPC · JPL
503821	2017 KE_{16}	—	February 17, 2013	Mount Lemmon	Mount Lemmon Survey	·	900 m	MPC · JPL
503822	2017 KG_{16}	—	November 1, 2010	Mount Lemmon	Mount Lemmon Survey	(194)	1.6 km	MPC · JPL
503823	2017 KT_{18}	—	September 11, 2004	Kitt Peak	Spacewatch	GEF	1.2 km	MPC · JPL
503824	2017 KV_{19}	—	May 11, 2007	Mount Lemmon	Mount Lemmon Survey	·	580 m	MPC · JPL
503825	2017 KX_{19}	—	October 6, 2008	Mount Lemmon	Mount Lemmon Survey	·	2.3 km	MPC · JPL
503826	2017 KY_{19}	—	April 30, 2006	Kitt Peak	Spacewatch	·	2.5 km	MPC · JPL
503827	2017 KP_{20}	—	November 26, 2014	Haleakala	Pan-STARRS 1	·	2.3 km	MPC · JPL
503828	2017 KU_{24}	—	April 20, 2010	Mount Lemmon	Mount Lemmon Survey	(2076)	720 m	MPC · JPL
503829	2017 KK_{25}	—	March 28, 2012	Catalina	CSS	·	2.0 km	MPC · JPL
503830	2017 KL_{26}	—	April 25, 2006	Kitt Peak	Spacewatch	(21885)	2.9 km	MPC · JPL
503831	2017 KR_{26}	—	September 15, 2005	Socorro	LINEAR	·	2.6 km	MPC · JPL
503832	2017 KZ_{26}	—	January 6, 2010	Kitt Peak	Spacewatch	EOS	2.4 km	MPC · JPL
503833	2017 KT_{27}	—	September 4, 2014	Haleakala	Pan-STARRS 1	·	2.2 km	MPC · JPL
503834	2017 KV_{27}	—	April 19, 2004	Socorro	LINEAR	·	1.6 km	MPC · JPL
503835	2017 KZ_{27}	—	July 18, 2007	Mount Lemmon	Mount Lemmon Survey	·	2.0 km	MPC · JPL
503836	2017 KS_{29}	—	December 4, 2007	Mount Lemmon	Mount Lemmon Survey	·	1.3 km	MPC · JPL
503837	2017 KX_{30}	—	April 14, 2008	Mount Lemmon	Mount Lemmon Survey	JUN	1.1 km	MPC · JPL
503838	2017 KR_{33}	—	April 19, 2010	WISE	WISE	URS	3.1 km	MPC · JPL
503839	2017 KU_{33}	—	June 27, 2005	Kitt Peak	Spacewatch	·	1.3 km	MPC · JPL
503840	2017 KO_{35}	—	November 18, 1995	Kitt Peak	Spacewatch	·	2.8 km	MPC · JPL
503841	2017 KR_{35}	—	December 29, 2003	Kitt Peak	Spacewatch	·	3.6 km	MPC · JPL
503842	2017 KU_{35}	—	April 2, 2006	Kitt Peak	Spacewatch	NYS	1.1 km	MPC · JPL
503843	2017 KW_{35}	—	March 10, 2002	Kitt Peak	Spacewatch	·	1.1 km	MPC · JPL
503844	2017 LK_{1}	—	April 14, 2008	Mount Lemmon	Mount Lemmon Survey	JUN	890 m	MPC · JPL
503845	2017 MV_{3}	—	May 17, 1999	Kitt Peak	Spacewatch	·	1.1 km	MPC · JPL
503846	2017 MG_{5}	—	January 22, 2015	Haleakala	Pan-STARRS 1	·	2.9 km	MPC · JPL
503847	2017 MF_{8}	—	July 3, 2000	Kitt Peak	Spacewatch	·	970 m	MPC · JPL
503848	4702 P-L	—	September 24, 1960	Palomar	C. J. van Houten, I. van Houten-Groeneveld, T. Gehrels	·	620 m	MPC · JPL
503849	1453 T-2	—	September 29, 1973	Palomar	C. J. van Houten, I. van Houten-Groeneveld, T. Gehrels	·	950 m	MPC · JPL
503850	4150 T-3	—	October 16, 1977	Palomar	C. J. van Houten, I. van Houten-Groeneveld, T. Gehrels	·	1.1 km	MPC · JPL
503851	1995 TZ_{3}	—	October 15, 1995	Kitt Peak	Spacewatch	·	1.3 km	MPC · JPL
503852	1995 TN_{4}	—	October 15, 1995	Kitt Peak	Spacewatch	·	2.8 km	MPC · JPL
503853	1995 VU_{8}	—	November 14, 1995	Kitt Peak	Spacewatch	·	2.5 km	MPC · JPL
503854	1996 RA_{7}	—	September 5, 1996	Kitt Peak	Spacewatch	EOS	1.9 km	MPC · JPL
503855	1996 SO_{5}	—	September 20, 1996	Kitt Peak	Spacewatch	H	430 m	MPC · JPL
503856	1996 TC_{34}	—	October 10, 1996	Kitt Peak	Spacewatch	·	2.6 km	MPC · JPL
503857	1996 VM_{16}	—	November 5, 1996	Kitt Peak	Spacewatch	·	1.5 km	MPC · JPL
503858	1998 HQ_{151}	—	April 28, 1998	Mauna Kea	C. A. Trujillo, D. J. Tholen, D. C. Jewitt, J. X. Luu	plutino	90 km	MPC · JPL
503859	1998 QO_{52}	—	August 26, 1998	Kitt Peak	Spacewatch	·	800 m	MPC · JPL
503860	1998 TM_{1}	—	October 12, 1998	Kitt Peak	Spacewatch	H	530 m	MPC · JPL
503861	1998 WZ_{1}	—	November 16, 1998	Socorro	LINEAR	APO · PHA	360 m	MPC · JPL
503862	1999 BG_{31}	—	January 19, 1999	Kitt Peak	Spacewatch	·	610 m	MPC · JPL
503863	1999 SU_{3}	—	September 21, 1999	Prescott	P. G. Comba	·	1.9 km	MPC · JPL
503864	1999 SJ_{24}	—	September 29, 1999	Catalina	CSS	·	710 m	MPC · JPL
503865	1999 VM_{11}	—	November 6, 1999	Socorro	LINEAR	AMO	240 m	MPC · JPL
503866	1999 VH_{83}	—	November 1, 1999	Kitt Peak	Spacewatch	·	1.2 km	MPC · JPL
503867	1999 VS_{84}	—	November 6, 1999	Kitt Peak	Spacewatch	·	1.4 km	MPC · JPL
503868	2000 AK_{42}	—	January 3, 2000	Socorro	LINEAR	H	640 m	MPC · JPL
503869	2000 GW_{23}	—	April 5, 2000	Socorro	LINEAR	·	1.2 km	MPC · JPL
503870	2000 QW_{225}	—	August 30, 2000	Kitt Peak	Spacewatch	·	1.0 km	MPC · JPL
503871	2000 SL	—	September 17, 2000	Socorro	LINEAR	APO +1km	800 m	MPC · JPL
503872	2000 SK_{52}	—	September 23, 2000	Socorro	LINEAR	·	1.5 km	MPC · JPL
503873	2000 SQ_{164}	—	September 2, 2000	Socorro	LINEAR	·	1.3 km	MPC · JPL
503874	2000 SH_{272}	—	September 28, 2000	Socorro	LINEAR	·	490 m	MPC · JPL
503875	2000 SB_{304}	—	September 22, 2000	Socorro	LINEAR	·	1.6 km	MPC · JPL
503876	2000 ST_{336}	—	September 26, 2000	Haleakala	NEAT	·	1.8 km	MPC · JPL
503877	2000 SR_{344}	—	September 29, 2000	Xinglong	SCAP	·	1.4 km	MPC · JPL
503878	2000 SS_{347}	—	September 22, 2000	Socorro	LINEAR	·	3.7 km	MPC · JPL
503879	2000 UJ_{3}	—	October 24, 2000	Socorro	LINEAR	·	870 m	MPC · JPL
503880	2000 YJ_{29}	—	December 23, 2000	Socorro	LINEAR	APO +1km	900 m	MPC · JPL
503881	2001 BZ_{2}	—	January 18, 2001	Socorro	LINEAR	·	1.9 km	MPC · JPL
503882	2001 BL_{40}	—	January 4, 2001	Socorro	LINEAR	·	1.4 km	MPC · JPL
503883	2001 QF_{331}	—	August 19, 2001	Cerro Tololo	Deep Ecliptic Survey	res · 3:5	103 km	MPC · JPL
503884	2001 SP_{152}	—	September 17, 2001	Socorro	LINEAR	T_{j} (2.99)	2.2 km	MPC · JPL
503885	2001 SU_{166}	—	September 18, 2001	Anderson Mesa	LONEOS	EOS	2.4 km	MPC · JPL
503886	2001 SM_{243}	—	September 19, 2001	Socorro	LINEAR	T_{j} (2.97)	1.4 km	MPC · JPL
503887	2001 TB_{53}	—	October 13, 2001	Socorro	LINEAR	·	2.1 km	MPC · JPL
503888	2001 TE_{213}	—	September 21, 2001	Kitt Peak	Spacewatch	·	2.1 km	MPC · JPL
503889	2001 TQ_{259}	—	October 11, 2001	Palomar	NEAT	H	440 m	MPC · JPL
503890	2001 TM_{263}	—	October 5, 1996	Kitt Peak	Spacewatch	·	1.9 km	MPC · JPL
503891	2001 UT_{6}	—	October 18, 2001	Desert Eagle	W. K. Y. Yeung	·	1.5 km	MPC · JPL
503892	2001 UF_{18}	—	October 26, 2001	Haleakala	NEAT	APO	500 m	MPC · JPL
503893	2001 UX_{38}	—	October 17, 2001	Socorro	LINEAR	·	2.4 km	MPC · JPL
503894	2001 UO_{131}	—	October 20, 2001	Socorro	LINEAR	·	2.2 km	MPC · JPL
503895	2001 UY_{171}	—	October 18, 2001	Palomar	NEAT	·	650 m	MPC · JPL
503896	2001 UL_{220}	—	October 21, 2001	Socorro	LINEAR	·	780 m	MPC · JPL
503897	2001 VA_{4}	—	November 11, 2001	Kitt Peak	Spacewatch	·	780 m	MPC · JPL
503898	2001 WO_{64}	—	November 19, 2001	Socorro	LINEAR	·	900 m	MPC · JPL
503899	2001 XX_{11}	—	December 9, 2001	Socorro	LINEAR	·	2.4 km	MPC · JPL
503900	2001 XU_{33}	—	December 7, 2001	Socorro	LINEAR	·	2.1 km	MPC · JPL

== 503901–504000 ==
back to top

Designation			Discovery			Properties		Ref
Permanent	Provisional	Named after	Date	Site	Discoverer(s)	Category	Diam.	Ref
503901	2001 XN_{181}	—	December 14, 2001	Socorro	LINEAR	TIR	2.8 km	MPC · JPL
503902	2001 YH_{44}	—	December 18, 2001	Socorro	LINEAR	·	2.5 km	MPC · JPL
503903	2002 AR_{147}	—	January 14, 2002	Socorro	LINEAR	·	770 m	MPC · JPL
503904	2002 AO_{193}	—	December 20, 2001	Socorro	LINEAR	PHO	1.1 km	MPC · JPL
503905	2002 CU_{5}	—	January 22, 2002	Socorro	LINEAR	·	3.2 km	MPC · JPL
503906	2002 CK_{9}	—	January 14, 2002	Kitt Peak	Spacewatch	·	1.7 km	MPC · JPL
503907	2002 CD_{66}	—	January 8, 2002	Socorro	LINEAR	·	710 m	MPC · JPL
503908	2002 CQ_{162}	—	February 8, 2002	Socorro	LINEAR	·	2.1 km	MPC · JPL
503909	2002 CH_{293}	—	February 7, 2002	Socorro	LINEAR	·	3.0 km	MPC · JPL
503910	2002 CD_{316}	—	February 14, 2002	Kitt Peak	Spacewatch	·	1.7 km	MPC · JPL
503911	2002 FD_{6}	—	March 21, 2002	Socorro	LINEAR	APO	90 m	MPC · JPL
503912	2002 FM_{23}	—	March 17, 2002	Kitt Peak	Spacewatch	H	500 m	MPC · JPL
503913	2002 JD_{58}	—	May 7, 2002	Kitt Peak	Spacewatch	·	650 m	MPC · JPL
503914	2002 OK_{33}	—	July 29, 2002	Palomar	NEAT	·	1.5 km	MPC · JPL
503915	2002 QD_{71}	—	August 27, 2002	Palomar	NEAT	·	1.4 km	MPC · JPL
503916	2002 QT_{96}	—	August 18, 2002	Palomar	NEAT	·	760 m	MPC · JPL
503917	2002 RW_{71}	—	September 5, 2002	Socorro	LINEAR	BRA	1.7 km	MPC · JPL
503918	2002 RD_{156}	—	September 11, 2002	Palomar	NEAT	NYS	920 m	MPC · JPL
503919	2002 RJ_{266}	—	September 4, 2002	Palomar	NEAT	·	2.0 km	MPC · JPL
503920	2002 TT_{299}	—	October 13, 2002	Kitt Peak	Spacewatch	NYS	970 m	MPC · JPL
503921	2002 TB_{335}	—	October 5, 2002	Apache Point	SDSS	·	1.6 km	MPC · JPL
503922	2002 UF_{4}	—	October 28, 2002	Socorro	LINEAR	·	1.8 km	MPC · JPL
503923	2002 WL_{32}	—	April 22, 2007	Kitt Peak	Spacewatch	3:2	6.2 km	MPC · JPL
503924	2002 XW_{71}	—	December 11, 2002	Socorro	LINEAR	·	1.3 km	MPC · JPL
503925	2002 YT_{15}	—	December 31, 2002	Kitt Peak	Spacewatch	·	2.8 km	MPC · JPL
503926	2003 BG_{59}	—	January 27, 2003	Socorro	LINEAR	·	2.0 km	MPC · JPL
503927	2003 BN_{93}	—	January 28, 2003	Kitt Peak	Spacewatch	·	1.9 km	MPC · JPL
503928	2003 EL_{35}	—	March 6, 2003	Socorro	LINEAR	·	350 m	MPC · JPL
503929	2003 KJ_{11}	—	May 26, 2003	Kitt Peak	Spacewatch	H	530 m	MPC · JPL
503930	2003 NA_{11}	—	July 3, 2003	Kitt Peak	Spacewatch	·	1.6 km	MPC · JPL
503931	2003 QN_{8}	—	August 20, 2003	Campo Imperatore	CINEOS	·	620 m	MPC · JPL
503932	2003 QW_{102}	—	August 31, 2003	Socorro	LINEAR	·	1.7 km	MPC · JPL
503933	2003 SK_{28}	—	September 18, 2003	Palomar	NEAT	DOR	2.3 km	MPC · JPL
503934	2003 SR_{48}	—	September 18, 2003	Palomar	NEAT	·	1.9 km	MPC · JPL
503935	2003 SW_{96}	—	September 19, 2003	Kitt Peak	Spacewatch	·	1.3 km	MPC · JPL
503936	2003 SV_{278}	—	September 21, 2003	Anderson Mesa	LONEOS	·	1.9 km	MPC · JPL
503937	2003 SO_{323}	—	September 16, 2003	Kitt Peak	Spacewatch	·	1.5 km	MPC · JPL
503938	2003 SL_{429}	—	September 21, 2003	Kitt Peak	Spacewatch	·	460 m	MPC · JPL
503939	2003 TR_{36}	—	October 1, 2003	Kitt Peak	Spacewatch	HOF	2.1 km	MPC · JPL
503940	2003 UA_{3}	—	October 16, 2003	Kitt Peak	Spacewatch	H	410 m	MPC · JPL
503941	2003 UV_{11}	—	October 21, 2003	Anderson Mesa	LONEOS	APO · PHA	260 m	MPC · JPL
503942	2003 UV_{30}	—	September 30, 2003	Socorro	LINEAR	·	600 m	MPC · JPL
503943	2003 UV_{84}	—	October 2, 2003	Kitt Peak	Spacewatch	·	510 m	MPC · JPL
503944	2003 UB_{138}	—	October 21, 2003	Socorro	LINEAR	·	1.0 km	MPC · JPL
503945	2003 UF_{190}	—	October 22, 2003	Kitt Peak	Spacewatch	·	770 m	MPC · JPL
503946	2003 UU_{232}	—	September 28, 2003	Kitt Peak	Spacewatch	·	570 m	MPC · JPL
503947	2003 UD_{242}	—	October 16, 2003	Anderson Mesa	LONEOS	·	590 m	MPC · JPL
503948	2003 UW_{247}	—	October 17, 2003	Kitt Peak	Spacewatch	·	710 m	MPC · JPL
503949	2003 UN_{287}	—	October 21, 2003	Palomar	NEAT	NYS	690 m	MPC · JPL
503950	2003 WJ_{49}	—	November 19, 2003	Socorro	LINEAR	PHO	1.5 km	MPC · JPL
503951	2003 WY_{154}	—	November 26, 2003	Kitt Peak	Spacewatch	·	2.1 km	MPC · JPL
503952	2003 YM_{130}	—	December 3, 2003	Socorro	LINEAR	·	1.1 km	MPC · JPL
503953	2004 CG_{68}	—	December 29, 2003	Kitt Peak	Spacewatch	ERI	1.3 km	MPC · JPL
503954	2004 EL_{27}	—	March 15, 2004	Kitt Peak	Spacewatch	·	2.6 km	MPC · JPL
503955	2004 ED_{107}	—	March 15, 2004	Kitt Peak	Spacewatch	SUL	1.9 km	MPC · JPL
503956	2004 NM_{25}	—	July 11, 2004	Socorro	LINEAR	H	450 m	MPC · JPL
503957	2004 PU_{9}	—	August 6, 2004	Campo Imperatore	CINEOS	·	1.3 km	MPC · JPL
503958	2004 PK_{13}	—	August 7, 2004	Palomar	NEAT	BAR	1.2 km	MPC · JPL
503959	2004 PO_{69}	—	August 7, 2004	Palomar	NEAT	·	1.3 km	MPC · JPL
503960	2004 QF_{1}	—	August 19, 2004	Socorro	LINEAR	APO	730 m	MPC · JPL
503961	2004 QU_{15}	—	August 23, 2004	Kitt Peak	Spacewatch	·	1.2 km	MPC · JPL
503962	2004 QD_{28}	—	August 21, 2004	Siding Spring	SSS	·	1.5 km	MPC · JPL
503963	2004 RE_{88}	—	September 7, 2004	Kitt Peak	Spacewatch	·	1.1 km	MPC · JPL
503964	2004 RB_{97}	—	September 8, 2004	Palomar	NEAT	·	2.1 km	MPC · JPL
503965	2004 RK_{102}	—	September 8, 2004	Socorro	LINEAR	·	1.2 km	MPC · JPL
503966	2004 RX_{109}	—	August 27, 2004	Socorro	LINEAR	APO	760 m	MPC · JPL
503967	2004 RC_{113}	—	September 6, 2004	Socorro	LINEAR	·	1.8 km	MPC · JPL
503968	2004 RB_{158}	—	August 22, 2004	Kitt Peak	Spacewatch	·	1.9 km	MPC · JPL
503969	2004 RE_{159}	—	September 10, 2004	Socorro	LINEAR	·	540 m	MPC · JPL
503970	2004 RQ_{162}	—	September 11, 2004	Socorro	LINEAR	·	1.2 km	MPC · JPL
503971	2004 RD_{180}	—	September 10, 2004	Socorro	LINEAR	·	610 m	MPC · JPL
503972	2004 RT_{271}	—	September 11, 2004	Kitt Peak	Spacewatch	·	1.2 km	MPC · JPL
503973	2004 RM_{275}	—	September 13, 2004	Kitt Peak	Spacewatch	·	410 m	MPC · JPL
503974	2004 SK_{19}	—	September 18, 2004	Socorro	LINEAR	HNS	1.2 km	MPC · JPL
503975	2004 SE_{44}	—	September 18, 2004	Socorro	LINEAR	(1547)	1.6 km	MPC · JPL
503976	2004 SZ_{52}	—	December 1, 2000	Kitt Peak	Spacewatch	·	1.3 km	MPC · JPL
503977	2004 TB_{22}	—	September 15, 2004	Anderson Mesa	LONEOS	·	1.5 km	MPC · JPL
503978	2004 TG_{34}	—	September 15, 2004	Kitt Peak	Spacewatch	·	1.2 km	MPC · JPL
503979	2004 TK_{43}	—	October 4, 2004	Kitt Peak	Spacewatch	·	1.2 km	MPC · JPL
503980	2004 TG_{86}	—	October 5, 2004	Kitt Peak	Spacewatch	·	1.2 km	MPC · JPL
503981	2004 TS_{90}	—	October 5, 2004	Kitt Peak	Spacewatch	·	620 m	MPC · JPL
503982	2004 TV_{91}	—	October 5, 2004	Kitt Peak	Spacewatch	·	1.6 km	MPC · JPL
503983	2004 TN_{93}	—	October 5, 2004	Kitt Peak	Spacewatch	·	1.2 km	MPC · JPL
503984	2004 TT_{99}	—	October 5, 2004	Kitt Peak	Spacewatch	·	450 m	MPC · JPL
503985	2004 TU_{108}	—	October 7, 2004	Socorro	LINEAR	·	580 m	MPC · JPL
503986	2004 TP_{183}	—	September 10, 2004	Kitt Peak	Spacewatch	·	1.5 km	MPC · JPL
503987	2004 TQ_{188}	—	September 10, 2004	Kitt Peak	Spacewatch	·	1.4 km	MPC · JPL
503988	2004 TJ_{202}	—	October 7, 2004	Kitt Peak	Spacewatch	·	1.7 km	MPC · JPL
503989	2004 TQ_{295}	—	October 10, 2004	Kitt Peak	Spacewatch	·	1.5 km	MPC · JPL
503990	2004 TG_{297}	—	October 11, 2004	Palomar	NEAT	·	1.7 km	MPC · JPL
503991	2004 TX_{359}	—	October 9, 2004	Kitt Peak	Spacewatch	·	1.7 km	MPC · JPL
503992	2004 VC_{12}	—	November 3, 2004	Catalina	CSS	·	2.3 km	MPC · JPL
503993	2004 VR_{20}	—	November 4, 2004	Catalina	CSS	·	1.5 km	MPC · JPL
503994	2004 VZ_{22}	—	November 4, 2004	Catalina	CSS	·	1.9 km	MPC · JPL
503995	2004 VU_{54}	—	November 4, 2004	Anderson Mesa	LONEOS	H	450 m	MPC · JPL
503996	2004 VJ_{75}	—	October 8, 2004	Kitt Peak	Spacewatch	H	460 m	MPC · JPL
503997	2004 XB_{71}	—	December 11, 2004	Kitt Peak	Spacewatch	·	1.3 km	MPC · JPL
503998	2004 XD_{78}	—	December 10, 2004	Socorro	LINEAR	·	2.0 km	MPC · JPL
503999	2004 XN_{111}	—	December 14, 2004	Kitt Peak	Spacewatch	·	1.2 km	MPC · JPL
504000	2004 YC_{26}	—	December 19, 2004	Mount Lemmon	Mount Lemmon Survey	·	640 m	MPC · JPL

back to top

== Meaning of names ==
As minor planet discoveries are confirmed, they are given a permanent number by the IAU's Minor Planet Center (MPC), and the discoverers can then submit names for them, following the IAU's naming conventions. The list below concerns those minor planets in the specified number-range that have received names, and explains the meanings of those names.

Official naming citations of newly named small Solar System bodies are approved and published in a bulletin by IAU's Working Group for Small Bodies Nomenclature (WGSBN). Before May 2021, citations were published in MPC's Minor Planet Circulars for many decades. Recent citations can also be found on the JPL Small-Body Database (SBDB). Until his death in 2016, German astronomer Lutz D. Schmadel compiled these citations into the Dictionary of Minor Planet Names (DMP) and regularly updated the collection.

Based on Paul Herget's The Names of the Minor Planets, Schmadel also researched the unclear origin of numerous asteroids, most of which had been named prior to World War II. This article incorporates text from this source, which is in the public domain: SBDB New namings may only be added to this list below after official publication as the preannouncement of names is condemned. The WGSBN publishes a comprehensive guideline for the naming rules of non-cometary small Solar System bodies.

Named minor planet	Provisional	This minor planet was named for...	Ref · Catalog
503033 New Hampshire	2015 FE_{144}	The state of New Hampshire is located in the northeast corner of the United States, within the region of New England.	JPL · 503033
