= List of minor planets: 729001–730000 =

The following is a partial list of minor planets, running from minor-planet number 729001 through 730000, inclusive. The primary data for this and other partial lists is based on JPL's "Small-Body Orbital Elements" and data available from the Minor Planet Center. Critical list information is also provided by the MPC, unless otherwise specified from Lowell Observatory. A detailed description of the table's columns and additional sources are given on the main page including a complete list of every page in this series, and a statistical break-up on the dynamical classification of minor planets.

Also see the summary list of all named bodies in numerical and alphabetical order, and the corresponding naming citations for the number range of this particular list. New namings may only be added to this list after official publication, as the preannouncement of names is condemned by the Working Group for Small Bodies Nomenclature of the International Astronomical Union.

Near-Earth obj.	MBA (inner)	MBA (outer)	Centaur
Mars-crosser	MBA (middle)	Jupiter trojan	Trans-Neptunian obj.
Unclassified

== 729001–729100 ==
Designation			Discovery			Properties		Ref
Permanent	Provisional	Named after	Date	Site	Discoverer(s)	Category	Diam.	Ref
729001	2010 WK_{80}	—	November 28, 2010	Mount Lemmon	Mount Lemmon Survey	L4	5.5 km	MPC · JPL
729002	2010 XD_{1}	—	February 26, 2003	Campo Imperatore	CINEOS	·	1.4 km	MPC · JPL
729003	2010 XD_{7}	—	August 25, 2000	Cerro Tololo	Deep Ecliptic Survey	·	1.6 km	MPC · JPL
729004	2010 XL_{9}	—	January 26, 1998	Kitt Peak	Spacewatch	·	1.6 km	MPC · JPL
729005	2010 XM_{11}	—	September 12, 2001	Kitt Peak	Deep Ecliptic Survey	·	1.2 km	MPC · JPL
729006	2010 XC_{34}	—	September 10, 2009	ESA OGS	ESA OGS	·	3.8 km	MPC · JPL
729007	2010 XR_{36}	—	December 3, 2010	Mount Lemmon	Mount Lemmon Survey	·	1.7 km	MPC · JPL
729008	2010 XE_{40}	—	December 4, 2010	Kitt Peak	Spacewatch	·	3.5 km	MPC · JPL
729009	2010 XU_{52}	—	October 14, 2010	Mount Lemmon	Mount Lemmon Survey	·	1.6 km	MPC · JPL
729010	2010 XH_{53}	—	February 4, 2009	Cerro Burek	I. de la Cueva	H	480 m	MPC · JPL
729011	2010 XO_{54}	—	September 15, 2009	Kitt Peak	Spacewatch	L4	8.4 km	MPC · JPL
729012	2010 XU_{57}	—	February 2, 2010	WISE	WISE	L4	16 km	MPC · JPL
729013	2010 XC_{64}	—	December 11, 2010	Mount Maidanak	A. V. Sergeyev, Y. N. Krugly	·	990 m	MPC · JPL
729014	2010 XP_{75}	—	September 26, 2000	Anderson Mesa	LONEOS	·	3.3 km	MPC · JPL
729015	2010 XD_{80}	—	December 6, 2010	Mount Lemmon	Mount Lemmon Survey	BAP	600 m	MPC · JPL
729016	2010 XC_{82}	—	December 2, 2010	Mount Lemmon	Mount Lemmon Survey	·	630 m	MPC · JPL
729017	2010 XW_{83}	—	December 2, 2010	Mount Lemmon	Mount Lemmon Survey	·	590 m	MPC · JPL
729018	2010 XX_{83}	—	September 26, 2009	Catalina	CSS	L4	10 km	MPC · JPL
729019	2010 XQ_{91}	—	March 19, 2015	Haleakala	Pan-STARRS 1	L4	6.8 km	MPC · JPL
729020	2010 XQ_{94}	—	March 13, 2012	Mount Lemmon	Mount Lemmon Survey	·	1.0 km	MPC · JPL
729021	2010 XY_{96}	—	December 3, 2010	Mount Lemmon	Mount Lemmon Survey	·	2.2 km	MPC · JPL
729022	2010 XY_{97}	—	February 21, 2012	Kitt Peak	Spacewatch	·	1.4 km	MPC · JPL
729023	2010 XO_{98}	—	January 1, 2012	Mount Lemmon	Mount Lemmon Survey	·	1.7 km	MPC · JPL
729024	2010 XT_{101}	—	December 29, 2016	Oukaïmeden	C. Rinner	THB	2.2 km	MPC · JPL
729025	2010 XU_{101}	—	December 5, 2010	Piszkés-tető	K. Sárneczky, Z. Kuli	·	1.6 km	MPC · JPL
729026	2010 XL_{102}	—	April 13, 2008	Kitt Peak	Spacewatch	PHO	780 m	MPC · JPL
729027	2010 XB_{108}	—	October 24, 2013	Mount Lemmon	Mount Lemmon Survey	·	510 m	MPC · JPL
729028	2010 XK_{108}	—	January 11, 2016	Haleakala	Pan-STARRS 1	·	1.4 km	MPC · JPL
729029	2010 XM_{109}	—	December 3, 2010	Mount Lemmon	Mount Lemmon Survey	·	1.3 km	MPC · JPL
729030	2010 XG_{111}	—	December 9, 2010	Mount Lemmon	Mount Lemmon Survey	·	720 m	MPC · JPL
729031	2010 XW_{115}	—	December 2, 2010	Kitt Peak	Spacewatch	·	1.8 km	MPC · JPL
729032	2010 XK_{118}	—	December 14, 2010	Mount Lemmon	Mount Lemmon Survey	EOS	1.4 km	MPC · JPL
729033	2010 YF	—	January 25, 2002	Palomar	NEAT	·	1.7 km	MPC · JPL
729034 Yinqiang	2010 YQ	Yinqiang	December 26, 2010	Xingming	Xu, Z., X. Gao	·	2.5 km	MPC · JPL
729035	2010 YY	—	December 13, 2010	Kitt Peak	Spacewatch	·	3.0 km	MPC · JPL
729036	2010 YW_{3}	—	December 30, 2010	Piszkés-tető	K. Sárneczky, Z. Kuli	·	580 m	MPC · JPL
729037	2010 YD_{6}	—	February 7, 2006	Kitt Peak	Spacewatch	·	1.9 km	MPC · JPL
729038	2011 AR_{4}	—	December 14, 2010	Kitt Peak	Spacewatch	·	2.6 km	MPC · JPL
729039	2011 AC_{5}	—	March 12, 2008	Mount Lemmon	Mount Lemmon Survey	·	510 m	MPC · JPL
729040	2011 AU_{5}	—	February 29, 2008	Kitt Peak	Spacewatch	·	920 m	MPC · JPL
729041	2011 AD_{7}	—	December 13, 2010	Kitt Peak	Spacewatch	·	2.2 km	MPC · JPL
729042	2011 AW_{8}	—	October 24, 2005	Mauna Kea	A. Boattini	·	1.8 km	MPC · JPL
729043	2011 AD_{9}	—	December 14, 2010	Mount Lemmon	Mount Lemmon Survey	EOS	1.9 km	MPC · JPL
729044	2011 AZ_{10}	—	November 22, 2006	Kitt Peak	Spacewatch	V	660 m	MPC · JPL
729045	2011 AV_{13}	—	October 14, 2001	Apache Point	SDSS Collaboration	·	1.3 km	MPC · JPL
729046	2011 AH_{14}	—	January 8, 2011	Mount Lemmon	Mount Lemmon Survey	·	2.4 km	MPC · JPL
729047	2011 AL_{16}	—	September 20, 2003	Palomar	NEAT	·	4.5 km	MPC · JPL
729048	2011 AP_{22}	—	January 10, 2011	Mount Lemmon	Mount Lemmon Survey	·	2.1 km	MPC · JPL
729049	2011 AK_{24}	—	January 9, 2011	Zelenchukskaya Stn	T. V. Krjačko, Satovski, B.	·	1.3 km	MPC · JPL
729050	2011 AV_{28}	—	March 31, 2001	Kitt Peak	Spacewatch	·	4.4 km	MPC · JPL
729051	2011 AZ_{30}	—	February 12, 2004	Kitt Peak	Spacewatch	·	610 m	MPC · JPL
729052	2011 AA_{34}	—	January 8, 2002	Apache Point	SDSS Collaboration	EUN	1.2 km	MPC · JPL
729053	2011 AJ_{39}	—	October 15, 2009	Catalina	CSS	·	4.0 km	MPC · JPL
729054	2011 AV_{39}	—	January 10, 2011	Mount Lemmon	Mount Lemmon Survey	·	1.8 km	MPC · JPL
729055	2011 AM_{41}	—	January 10, 2011	Mount Lemmon	Mount Lemmon Survey	·	1.7 km	MPC · JPL
729056	2011 AR_{43}	—	December 8, 2010	Mount Lemmon	Mount Lemmon Survey	·	770 m	MPC · JPL
729057	2011 AB_{44}	—	January 10, 2011	Kitt Peak	Spacewatch	T_{j} (2.97)	2.8 km	MPC · JPL
729058	2011 AB_{49}	—	January 12, 2011	Mount Lemmon	Mount Lemmon Survey	·	1.7 km	MPC · JPL
729059	2011 AX_{52}	—	January 11, 2011	Kitt Peak	Spacewatch	·	660 m	MPC · JPL
729060	2011 AY_{52}	—	January 11, 2011	Kitt Peak	Spacewatch	EOS	1.8 km	MPC · JPL
729061	2011 AR_{57}	—	January 11, 2011	Mount Lemmon	Mount Lemmon Survey	·	2.0 km	MPC · JPL
729062	2011 AL_{61}	—	January 13, 2011	Kitt Peak	Spacewatch	·	1.6 km	MPC · JPL
729063	2011 AC_{62}	—	November 1, 2005	Mount Lemmon	Mount Lemmon Survey	·	1.4 km	MPC · JPL
729064	2011 AT_{62}	—	January 13, 2011	Kitt Peak	Spacewatch	·	1.5 km	MPC · JPL
729065	2011 AM_{63}	—	January 20, 2010	WISE	WISE	(895)	3.9 km	MPC · JPL
729066	2011 AL_{64}	—	January 14, 2011	Mount Lemmon	Mount Lemmon Survey	·	1.3 km	MPC · JPL
729067	2011 AQ_{64}	—	October 22, 2006	Mount Lemmon	Mount Lemmon Survey	MAS	630 m	MPC · JPL
729068	2011 AH_{66}	—	January 30, 2006	Kitt Peak	Spacewatch	EOS	1.4 km	MPC · JPL
729069	2011 AJ_{66}	—	January 31, 1995	Kitt Peak	Spacewatch	·	740 m	MPC · JPL
729070	2011 AP_{66}	—	January 14, 2011	Kitt Peak	Spacewatch	EOS	2.0 km	MPC · JPL
729071	2011 AC_{70}	—	September 24, 2009	Mount Lemmon	Mount Lemmon Survey	·	1.6 km	MPC · JPL
729072	2011 AW_{71}	—	November 13, 2006	Catalina	CSS	PHO	860 m	MPC · JPL
729073	2011 AZ_{74}	—	January 9, 2011	Mayhill-ISON	L. Elenin	PHO	930 m	MPC · JPL
729074	2011 AF_{76}	—	January 2, 2011	Mount Lemmon	Mount Lemmon Survey	·	600 m	MPC · JPL
729075	2011 AQ_{82}	—	January 12, 2011	Kitt Peak	Spacewatch	·	710 m	MPC · JPL
729076	2011 AM_{83}	—	January 11, 2011	Mount Lemmon	Mount Lemmon Survey	V	520 m	MPC · JPL
729077	2011 AO_{83}	—	January 13, 2011	Kitt Peak	Spacewatch	·	1.4 km	MPC · JPL
729078	2011 AP_{83}	—	January 13, 2011	Kitt Peak	Spacewatch	·	2.7 km	MPC · JPL
729079	2011 AY_{83}	—	December 6, 2010	Mount Lemmon	Mount Lemmon Survey	EOS	1.7 km	MPC · JPL
729080	2011 AJ_{84}	—	January 8, 2011	Mount Lemmon	Mount Lemmon Survey	·	2.3 km	MPC · JPL
729081	2011 AU_{84}	—	January 2, 2011	Mount Lemmon	Mount Lemmon Survey	·	1.1 km	MPC · JPL
729082	2011 AL_{85}	—	February 5, 2010	WISE	WISE	·	3.0 km	MPC · JPL
729083	2011 AQ_{85}	—	January 21, 2010	WISE	WISE	·	3.3 km	MPC · JPL
729084	2011 AX_{86}	—	March 25, 2012	Mount Lemmon	Mount Lemmon Survey	EOS	1.7 km	MPC · JPL
729085	2011 AC_{87}	—	January 12, 2011	Mount Lemmon	Mount Lemmon Survey	·	2.5 km	MPC · JPL
729086	2011 AY_{88}	—	January 28, 2007	Mount Lemmon	Mount Lemmon Survey	·	910 m	MPC · JPL
729087	2011 AL_{89}	—	January 14, 2011	Mount Lemmon	Mount Lemmon Survey	·	1.5 km	MPC · JPL
729088	2011 AM_{89}	—	July 13, 2013	Haleakala	Pan-STARRS 1	·	1.7 km	MPC · JPL
729089	2011 AQ_{89}	—	February 4, 2010	WISE	WISE	·	3.4 km	MPC · JPL
729090	2011 AR_{90}	—	January 16, 2015	Haleakala	Pan-STARRS 1	·	990 m	MPC · JPL
729091	2011 AO_{91}	—	January 20, 2010	WISE	WISE	EOS	1.6 km	MPC · JPL
729092	2011 AS_{91}	—	January 18, 2010	WISE	WISE	·	2.5 km	MPC · JPL
729093	2011 AT_{91}	—	August 23, 2014	Haleakala	Pan-STARRS 1	·	1.7 km	MPC · JPL
729094	2011 AC_{97}	—	January 2, 2011	Mount Lemmon	Mount Lemmon Survey	·	1.6 km	MPC · JPL
729095	2011 AQ_{97}	—	January 12, 2011	Mount Lemmon	Mount Lemmon Survey	·	1.2 km	MPC · JPL
729096	2011 AX_{97}	—	January 14, 2011	Mount Lemmon	Mount Lemmon Survey	V	570 m	MPC · JPL
729097	2011 AG_{100}	—	January 14, 2011	Mount Lemmon	Mount Lemmon Survey	·	1.5 km	MPC · JPL
729098	2011 AQ_{101}	—	January 4, 2011	Mount Lemmon	Mount Lemmon Survey	·	2.1 km	MPC · JPL
729099	2011 AY_{103}	—	January 14, 2011	Kitt Peak	Spacewatch	EOS	1.6 km	MPC · JPL
729100	2011 AX_{107}	—	January 4, 2011	Mount Lemmon	Mount Lemmon Survey	·	480 m	MPC · JPL

== 729101–729200 ==
back to top

Designation			Discovery			Properties		Ref
Permanent	Provisional	Named after	Date	Site	Discoverer(s)	Category	Diam.	Ref
729101	2011 BE	—	December 13, 2010	Mount Lemmon	Mount Lemmon Survey	·	2.6 km	MPC · JPL
729102	2011 BV	—	January 25, 2007	Kitt Peak	Spacewatch	·	900 m	MPC · JPL
729103	2011 BU_{4}	—	October 26, 2009	Mount Lemmon	Mount Lemmon Survey	·	2.3 km	MPC · JPL
729104	2011 BY_{9}	—	January 19, 2005	Kitt Peak	Spacewatch	·	5.4 km	MPC · JPL
729105	2011 BE_{11}	—	February 2, 2010	WISE	WISE	·	4.7 km	MPC · JPL
729106	2011 BE_{12}	—	January 18, 2010	WISE	WISE	ELF	4.4 km	MPC · JPL
729107	2011 BR_{14}	—	January 26, 2011	Mount Lemmon	Mount Lemmon Survey	NYS	880 m	MPC · JPL
729108	2011 BM_{16}	—	January 22, 2010	WISE	WISE	URS	2.9 km	MPC · JPL
729109	2011 BG_{18}	—	August 23, 2003	Palomar	NEAT	·	3.6 km	MPC · JPL
729110	2011 BS_{19}	—	January 8, 2011	Mount Lemmon	Mount Lemmon Survey	T_{j} (2.94)	3.5 km	MPC · JPL
729111	2011 BB_{20}	—	December 14, 2010	Mount Lemmon	Mount Lemmon Survey	·	2.7 km	MPC · JPL
729112	2011 BP_{23}	—	January 27, 2011	Mount Lemmon	Mount Lemmon Survey	MAS	470 m	MPC · JPL
729113	2011 BE_{27}	—	July 4, 2005	Palomar	NEAT	(5)	1.4 km	MPC · JPL
729114	2011 BL_{32}	—	October 22, 2003	Apache Point	SDSS Collaboration	·	2.3 km	MPC · JPL
729115	2011 BK_{35}	—	January 14, 2011	Kitt Peak	Spacewatch	·	2.2 km	MPC · JPL
729116	2011 BS_{36}	—	January 28, 2011	Mount Lemmon	Mount Lemmon Survey	VER	2.1 km	MPC · JPL
729117	2011 BV_{37}	—	January 28, 2011	Mount Lemmon	Mount Lemmon Survey	EOS	1.4 km	MPC · JPL
729118	2011 BT_{40}	—	January 29, 2011	Bergisch Gladbach	W. Bickel	·	1.2 km	MPC · JPL
729119	2011 BH_{42}	—	March 4, 2006	Mount Lemmon	Mount Lemmon Survey	·	2.4 km	MPC · JPL
729120	2011 BH_{44}	—	October 23, 2003	Apache Point	SDSS Collaboration	·	2.3 km	MPC · JPL
729121	2011 BY_{45}	—	March 6, 2000	Haleakala	NEAT	·	3.8 km	MPC · JPL
729122	2011 BA_{48}	—	February 14, 2010	WISE	WISE	·	1.8 km	MPC · JPL
729123	2011 BP_{48}	—	January 31, 2011	Piszkés-tető	K. Sárneczky, Z. Kuli	MRX	900 m	MPC · JPL
729124	2011 BY_{48}	—	January 31, 2011	Piszkés-tető	K. Sárneczky, Z. Kuli	V	530 m	MPC · JPL
729125	2011 BU_{49}	—	January 31, 2011	Piszkés-tető	K. Sárneczky, Z. Kuli	·	990 m	MPC · JPL
729126	2011 BF_{58}	—	January 30, 2011	Mount Lemmon	Mount Lemmon Survey	·	670 m	MPC · JPL
729127	2011 BT_{60}	—	December 12, 2004	Palomar	NEAT	·	3.3 km	MPC · JPL
729128	2011 BP_{65}	—	September 19, 2009	Mount Lemmon	Mount Lemmon Survey	·	790 m	MPC · JPL
729129	2011 BQ_{65}	—	February 1, 2011	Piszkés-tető	K. Sárneczky, Z. Kuli	·	2.0 km	MPC · JPL
729130	2011 BY_{65}	—	November 22, 1996	Ondřejov	L. Kotková	·	2.7 km	MPC · JPL
729131	2011 BO_{69}	—	January 10, 2011	Mount Lemmon	Mount Lemmon Survey	EOS	1.5 km	MPC · JPL
729132	2011 BP_{73}	—	October 4, 2002	Kitt Peak	Spacewatch	MAS	550 m	MPC · JPL
729133	2011 BS_{79}	—	March 19, 1993	La Silla	UESAC	·	1.2 km	MPC · JPL
729134	2011 BM_{80}	—	February 16, 2004	Kitt Peak	Spacewatch	PHO	640 m	MPC · JPL
729135	2011 BY_{80}	—	November 6, 2009	Pla D'Arguines	R. Ferrando, Ferrando, M.	EOS	1.7 km	MPC · JPL
729136	2011 BZ_{81}	—	January 29, 2011	Kitt Peak	Spacewatch	·	1.0 km	MPC · JPL
729137	2011 BN_{85}	—	September 29, 2009	Catalina	CSS	·	3.2 km	MPC · JPL
729138	2011 BM_{87}	—	January 11, 2011	Kitt Peak	Spacewatch	·	1.9 km	MPC · JPL
729139	2011 BJ_{88}	—	January 18, 2010	WISE	WISE	·	2.1 km	MPC · JPL
729140	2011 BQ_{89}	—	January 14, 2011	Kitt Peak	Spacewatch	·	900 m	MPC · JPL
729141	2011 BT_{91}	—	September 29, 2008	Mount Lemmon	Mount Lemmon Survey	·	2.4 km	MPC · JPL
729142	2011 BN_{104}	—	March 3, 2006	Kitt Peak	Spacewatch	·	1.4 km	MPC · JPL
729143	2011 BS_{108}	—	February 10, 2011	Mount Lemmon	Mount Lemmon Survey	·	1.8 km	MPC · JPL
729144	2011 BL_{111}	—	February 26, 2011	Mount Lemmon	Mount Lemmon Survey	EOS	1.5 km	MPC · JPL
729145	2011 BW_{111}	—	February 12, 2011	Mount Lemmon	Mount Lemmon Survey	·	1.9 km	MPC · JPL
729146	2011 BX_{112}	—	March 31, 2011	Haleakala	Pan-STARRS 1	V	490 m	MPC · JPL
729147	2011 BE_{114}	—	October 2, 2006	Mount Lemmon	Mount Lemmon Survey	·	560 m	MPC · JPL
729148	2011 BK_{117}	—	January 13, 2011	Mount Lemmon	Mount Lemmon Survey	·	1.0 km	MPC · JPL
729149	2011 BY_{117}	—	January 25, 2011	Mount Lemmon	Mount Lemmon Survey	EOS	1.6 km	MPC · JPL
729150	2011 BA_{118}	—	September 19, 2008	Kitt Peak	Spacewatch	·	2.9 km	MPC · JPL
729151	2011 BC_{122}	—	October 30, 2009	Mount Lemmon	Mount Lemmon Survey	·	2.2 km	MPC · JPL
729152	2011 BD_{122}	—	January 30, 2011	Mount Lemmon	Mount Lemmon Survey	·	1.1 km	MPC · JPL
729153	2011 BA_{123}	—	February 8, 2011	Mount Lemmon	Mount Lemmon Survey	·	870 m	MPC · JPL
729154	2011 BD_{123}	—	January 14, 2011	Kitt Peak	Spacewatch	·	830 m	MPC · JPL
729155	2011 BU_{124}	—	December 10, 2010	Mount Lemmon	Mount Lemmon Survey	EOS	1.7 km	MPC · JPL
729156	2011 BL_{125}	—	September 6, 2008	Mount Lemmon	Mount Lemmon Survey	·	1.8 km	MPC · JPL
729157	2011 BU_{125}	—	January 27, 2011	Mount Lemmon	Mount Lemmon Survey	EOS	1.4 km	MPC · JPL
729158	2011 BB_{126}	—	May 19, 2005	Mount Lemmon	Mount Lemmon Survey	·	1.3 km	MPC · JPL
729159	2011 BF_{129}	—	January 28, 2011	Mount Lemmon	Mount Lemmon Survey	·	2.4 km	MPC · JPL
729160	2011 BJ_{130}	—	October 16, 2009	Mount Lemmon	Mount Lemmon Survey	·	1.2 km	MPC · JPL
729161	2011 BL_{130}	—	January 28, 2011	Mount Lemmon	Mount Lemmon Survey	·	1.4 km	MPC · JPL
729162	2011 BK_{131}	—	January 28, 2011	Mount Lemmon	Mount Lemmon Survey	·	1.3 km	MPC · JPL
729163	2011 BW_{131}	—	January 28, 2011	Mount Lemmon	Mount Lemmon Survey	·	1.7 km	MPC · JPL
729164	2011 BP_{134}	—	May 14, 2007	Charleston	R. Holmes	·	1.5 km	MPC · JPL
729165	2011 BU_{135}	—	January 29, 2011	Mount Lemmon	Mount Lemmon Survey	V	530 m	MPC · JPL
729166	2011 BJ_{137}	—	January 8, 2011	Mount Lemmon	Mount Lemmon Survey	·	2.3 km	MPC · JPL
729167	2011 BO_{140}	—	January 8, 2011	Mount Lemmon	Mount Lemmon Survey	·	1.5 km	MPC · JPL
729168	2011 BR_{144}	—	November 6, 2002	Anderson Mesa	LONEOS	·	1.1 km	MPC · JPL
729169	2011 BT_{145}	—	January 14, 2011	Kitt Peak	Spacewatch	·	2.3 km	MPC · JPL
729170	2011 BL_{151}	—	April 20, 2007	Kitt Peak	Spacewatch	·	1.5 km	MPC · JPL
729171	2011 BT_{154}	—	January 27, 2011	Mount Lemmon	Mount Lemmon Survey	·	2.7 km	MPC · JPL
729172	2011 BM_{159}	—	January 29, 2011	Mount Lemmon	Mount Lemmon Survey	·	2.0 km	MPC · JPL
729173	2011 BF_{161}	—	January 20, 2010	WISE	WISE	·	3.5 km	MPC · JPL
729174	2011 BR_{163}	—	January 27, 2011	Haleakala	Pan-STARRS 1	SDO	239 km	MPC · JPL
729175	2011 BG_{165}	—	January 27, 2011	Mount Lemmon	Mount Lemmon Survey	·	940 m	MPC · JPL
729176	2011 BJ_{165}	—	October 22, 2009	Mount Lemmon	Mount Lemmon Survey	·	2.5 km	MPC · JPL
729177	2011 BK_{165}	—	January 28, 2011	Mount Lemmon	Mount Lemmon Survey	·	1.4 km	MPC · JPL
729178	2011 BL_{165}	—	January 29, 2011	Kitt Peak	Spacewatch	·	2.5 km	MPC · JPL
729179	2011 BN_{165}	—	March 6, 2011	Mount Lemmon	Mount Lemmon Survey	·	2.0 km	MPC · JPL
729180	2011 BZ_{167}	—	February 25, 2011	Mount Lemmon	Mount Lemmon Survey	·	1.4 km	MPC · JPL
729181	2011 BA_{168}	—	September 15, 2009	Kitt Peak	Spacewatch	·	900 m	MPC · JPL
729182	2011 BK_{168}	—	March 1, 2011	Catalina	CSS	·	1.0 km	MPC · JPL
729183	2011 BZ_{168}	—	January 26, 2011	Kitt Peak	Spacewatch	EOS	1.4 km	MPC · JPL
729184	2011 BA_{170}	—	December 14, 2004	Kitt Peak	Spacewatch	·	4.4 km	MPC · JPL
729185	2011 BH_{170}	—	February 18, 2010	WISE	WISE	·	3.5 km	MPC · JPL
729186	2011 BR_{170}	—	January 28, 2011	Kitt Peak	Spacewatch	·	1.1 km	MPC · JPL
729187	2011 BW_{170}	—	January 30, 2011	Haleakala	Pan-STARRS 1	·	2.4 km	MPC · JPL
729188	2011 BM_{171}	—	January 30, 2011	Mount Lemmon	Mount Lemmon Survey	·	920 m	MPC · JPL
729189	2011 BC_{172}	—	July 30, 2010	WISE	WISE	·	3.2 km	MPC · JPL
729190	2011 BY_{172}	—	January 30, 2011	Mount Lemmon	Mount Lemmon Survey	·	2.0 km	MPC · JPL
729191	2011 BK_{173}	—	January 2, 2016	Mount Lemmon	Mount Lemmon Survey	·	2.3 km	MPC · JPL
729192	2011 BS_{173}	—	February 10, 2011	Mount Lemmon	Mount Lemmon Survey	·	570 m	MPC · JPL
729193	2011 BZ_{173}	—	February 10, 2011	Mount Lemmon	Mount Lemmon Survey	·	1.0 km	MPC · JPL
729194	2011 BG_{175}	—	February 5, 2011	Haleakala	Pan-STARRS 1	·	560 m	MPC · JPL
729195	2011 BU_{175}	—	February 9, 2010	WISE	WISE	URS	2.6 km	MPC · JPL
729196	2011 BZ_{175}	—	April 24, 2012	Kitt Peak	Spacewatch	·	2.3 km	MPC · JPL
729197	2011 BQ_{177}	—	January 27, 2010	WISE	WISE	·	2.1 km	MPC · JPL
729198	2011 BS_{177}	—	November 25, 2014	Haleakala	Pan-STARRS 1	·	1.8 km	MPC · JPL
729199	2011 BB_{178}	—	January 23, 2011	Mount Lemmon	Mount Lemmon Survey	·	920 m	MPC · JPL
729200	2011 BW_{178}	—	January 28, 2011	Mount Lemmon	Mount Lemmon Survey	TIR	2.6 km	MPC · JPL

== 729201–729300 ==
back to top

Designation			Discovery			Properties		Ref
Permanent	Provisional	Named after	Date	Site	Discoverer(s)	Category	Diam.	Ref
729201	2011 BM_{181}	—	January 29, 2011	Kitt Peak	Spacewatch	·	2.4 km	MPC · JPL
729202	2011 BH_{182}	—	April 1, 2012	Mount Lemmon	Mount Lemmon Survey	·	1.4 km	MPC · JPL
729203	2011 BP_{182}	—	January 30, 2011	Mount Lemmon	Mount Lemmon Survey	EOS	1.5 km	MPC · JPL
729204	2011 BM_{183}	—	October 29, 2014	Haleakala	Pan-STARRS 1	·	1.6 km	MPC · JPL
729205	2011 BE_{184}	—	December 18, 2015	Mount Lemmon	Mount Lemmon Survey	EOS	1.6 km	MPC · JPL
729206	2011 BW_{184}	—	May 19, 2012	Mount Lemmon	Mount Lemmon Survey	PHO	680 m	MPC · JPL
729207	2011 BP_{187}	—	February 25, 2011	Mount Lemmon	Mount Lemmon Survey	·	2.2 km	MPC · JPL
729208	2011 BT_{187}	—	February 7, 2011	Mount Lemmon	Mount Lemmon Survey	·	2.7 km	MPC · JPL
729209	2011 BY_{187}	—	February 11, 2011	Mount Lemmon	Mount Lemmon Survey	·	2.4 km	MPC · JPL
729210	2011 BL_{188}	—	November 28, 2013	Mount Lemmon	Mount Lemmon Survey	NYS	640 m	MPC · JPL
729211	2011 BU_{190}	—	March 29, 2012	Haleakala	Pan-STARRS 1	·	2.0 km	MPC · JPL
729212	2011 BA_{191}	—	February 1, 2016	Haleakala	Pan-STARRS 1	EOS	1.5 km	MPC · JPL
729213	2011 BE_{192}	—	January 30, 2011	Mount Lemmon	Mount Lemmon Survey	·	2.6 km	MPC · JPL
729214	2011 BN_{194}	—	January 26, 2011	Kitt Peak	Spacewatch	·	2.2 km	MPC · JPL
729215	2011 BS_{196}	—	January 26, 2011	Mount Lemmon	Mount Lemmon Survey	HOF	1.9 km	MPC · JPL
729216	2011 BT_{197}	—	January 25, 2011	Mount Lemmon	Mount Lemmon Survey	V	530 m	MPC · JPL
729217	2011 BB_{198}	—	January 28, 2011	Mount Lemmon	Mount Lemmon Survey	·	1.5 km	MPC · JPL
729218	2011 BL_{199}	—	January 27, 2011	Mount Lemmon	Mount Lemmon Survey	·	1.8 km	MPC · JPL
729219	2011 BR_{202}	—	January 30, 2011	Haleakala	Pan-STARRS 1	·	2.1 km	MPC · JPL
729220	2011 CY	—	September 26, 2003	Apache Point	SDSS Collaboration	·	2.7 km	MPC · JPL
729221	2011 CC_{1}	—	February 1, 2010	WISE	WISE	EMA	2.9 km	MPC · JPL
729222	2011 CY_{2}	—	February 2, 2011	Les Engarouines	L. Bernasconi	EUP	3.3 km	MPC · JPL
729223	2011 CO_{6}	—	October 24, 2003	Apache Point	SDSS Collaboration	·	2.4 km	MPC · JPL
729224	2011 CB_{16}	—	September 28, 2003	Apache Point	SDSS Collaboration	·	2.1 km	MPC · JPL
729225	2011 CC_{16}	—	February 3, 2011	Sandlot	G. Hug	·	1.8 km	MPC · JPL
729226	2011 CF_{18}	—	August 6, 2002	Palomar	NEAT	·	4.5 km	MPC · JPL
729227	2011 CQ_{19}	—	January 27, 2011	Kitt Peak	Spacewatch	·	1.8 km	MPC · JPL
729228	2011 CD_{21}	—	October 18, 2009	Kitt Peak	Spacewatch	EOS	1.3 km	MPC · JPL
729229	2011 CE_{21}	—	February 7, 2010	WISE	WISE	·	1.9 km	MPC · JPL
729230	2011 CC_{23}	—	March 31, 2003	Kitt Peak	Spacewatch	·	2.0 km	MPC · JPL
729231	2011 CT_{23}	—	September 25, 2001	Anderson Mesa	LONEOS	·	1.8 km	MPC · JPL
729232	2011 CF_{25}	—	September 19, 2003	Kitt Peak	Spacewatch	·	3.1 km	MPC · JPL
729233	2011 CW_{25}	—	May 24, 2001	Apache Point	SDSS Collaboration	·	3.7 km	MPC · JPL
729234	2011 CF_{26}	—	April 29, 2008	Mount Lemmon	Mount Lemmon Survey	·	830 m	MPC · JPL
729235	2011 CD_{28}	—	July 31, 2008	Kitt Peak	Spacewatch	·	3.6 km	MPC · JPL
729236	2011 CM_{30}	—	January 25, 2011	Kitt Peak	Spacewatch	CLA	1.3 km	MPC · JPL
729237	2011 CA_{33}	—	February 3, 2010	WISE	WISE	·	2.6 km	MPC · JPL
729238	2011 CK_{34}	—	January 30, 2010	WISE	WISE	ARM	3.3 km	MPC · JPL
729239	2011 CQ_{36}	—	January 29, 2011	Kitt Peak	Spacewatch	AGN	1.0 km	MPC · JPL
729240	2011 CA_{37}	—	February 5, 2011	Mount Lemmon	Mount Lemmon Survey	·	1.3 km	MPC · JPL
729241	2011 CR_{37}	—	December 8, 2010	Mount Lemmon	Mount Lemmon Survey	·	970 m	MPC · JPL
729242	2011 CH_{38}	—	February 5, 2011	Mount Lemmon	Mount Lemmon Survey	·	1.5 km	MPC · JPL
729243	2011 CK_{40}	—	February 6, 2011	Catalina	CSS	·	2.1 km	MPC · JPL
729244	2011 CK_{43}	—	February 25, 2006	Kitt Peak	Spacewatch	·	1.9 km	MPC · JPL
729245	2011 CV_{44}	—	October 20, 2006	Mount Lemmon	Mount Lemmon Survey	·	670 m	MPC · JPL
729246	2011 CB_{46}	—	February 8, 2011	Mount Lemmon	Mount Lemmon Survey	·	1.9 km	MPC · JPL
729247	2011 CS_{47}	—	November 23, 2006	Kitt Peak	Spacewatch	·	1.2 km	MPC · JPL
729248	2011 CT_{55}	—	February 8, 2011	Mount Lemmon	Mount Lemmon Survey	·	2.7 km	MPC · JPL
729249	2011 CL_{56}	—	February 8, 2011	Mount Lemmon	Mount Lemmon Survey	·	860 m	MPC · JPL
729250	2011 CX_{56}	—	February 3, 2010	WISE	WISE	·	2.6 km	MPC · JPL
729251	2011 CY_{60}	—	February 15, 2010	WISE	WISE	·	2.6 km	MPC · JPL
729252	2011 CL_{62}	—	January 28, 2011	Mount Lemmon	Mount Lemmon Survey	NYS	770 m	MPC · JPL
729253	2011 CO_{64}	—	February 12, 2011	Mount Lemmon	Mount Lemmon Survey	·	2.4 km	MPC · JPL
729254	2011 CY_{68}	—	March 19, 2004	Palomar	NEAT	·	2.5 km	MPC · JPL
729255	2011 CB_{69}	—	February 6, 2011	Alder Springs	Levin, K.	·	1.7 km	MPC · JPL
729256	2011 CD_{69}	—	January 14, 2010	WISE	WISE	ADE	2.3 km	MPC · JPL
729257	2011 CR_{70}	—	March 5, 2002	Apache Point	SDSS Collaboration	·	2.3 km	MPC · JPL
729258	2011 CZ_{73}	—	February 19, 2010	WISE	WISE	T_{j} (2.99) · EUP	4.9 km	MPC · JPL
729259	2011 CJ_{77}	—	February 3, 2011	Piszkés-tető	K. Sárneczky, Z. Kuli	EOS	1.4 km	MPC · JPL
729260	2011 CF_{81}	—	March 6, 2011	Mount Lemmon	Mount Lemmon Survey	·	790 m	MPC · JPL
729261	2011 CP_{81}	—	November 19, 2009	Mount Lemmon	Mount Lemmon Survey	EOS	1.6 km	MPC · JPL
729262	2011 CT_{83}	—	February 5, 2011	Haleakala	Pan-STARRS 1	·	1.9 km	MPC · JPL
729263	2011 CO_{84}	—	February 10, 2011	Mount Lemmon	Mount Lemmon Survey	·	2.3 km	MPC · JPL
729264	2011 CA_{85}	—	December 11, 2010	Mount Lemmon	Mount Lemmon Survey	·	1.0 km	MPC · JPL
729265	2011 CF_{85}	—	January 26, 2010	WISE	WISE	·	3.2 km	MPC · JPL
729266	2011 CN_{90}	—	February 10, 2011	Mount Lemmon	Mount Lemmon Survey	·	2.0 km	MPC · JPL
729267	2011 CP_{91}	—	October 5, 2002	Apache Point	SDSS Collaboration	V	600 m	MPC · JPL
729268	2011 CW_{94}	—	February 10, 2011	Mount Lemmon	Mount Lemmon Survey	·	850 m	MPC · JPL
729269	2011 CR_{96}	—	February 5, 2011	Mount Lemmon	Mount Lemmon Survey	·	1.6 km	MPC · JPL
729270	2011 CQ_{100}	—	February 5, 2011	Haleakala	Pan-STARRS 1	·	2.7 km	MPC · JPL
729271	2011 CS_{101}	—	September 21, 2003	Palomar	NEAT	·	2.3 km	MPC · JPL
729272	2011 CD_{102}	—	February 5, 2011	Haleakala	Pan-STARRS 1	·	2.5 km	MPC · JPL
729273	2011 CD_{105}	—	February 26, 2011	Mount Lemmon	Mount Lemmon Survey	·	970 m	MPC · JPL
729274	2011 CE_{106}	—	February 5, 2011	Haleakala	Pan-STARRS 1	·	1.6 km	MPC · JPL
729275	2011 CU_{109}	—	February 5, 2011	Haleakala	Pan-STARRS 1	·	1.7 km	MPC · JPL
729276	2011 CB_{111}	—	September 17, 2009	Kitt Peak	Spacewatch	·	2.4 km	MPC · JPL
729277	2011 CS_{115}	—	November 18, 2009	Kitt Peak	Spacewatch	·	1.7 km	MPC · JPL
729278	2011 CW_{117}	—	January 8, 2010	WISE	WISE	EUP	5.3 km	MPC · JPL
729279	2011 CD_{118}	—	February 25, 2007	Mount Lemmon	Mount Lemmon Survey	(5)	950 m	MPC · JPL
729280	2011 CD_{122}	—	January 25, 2015	Haleakala	Pan-STARRS 1	·	1.1 km	MPC · JPL
729281	2011 CK_{122}	—	October 25, 2013	Mount Lemmon	Mount Lemmon Survey	·	990 m	MPC · JPL
729282	2011 CW_{122}	—	July 13, 2013	Mount Lemmon	Mount Lemmon Survey	EOS	1.7 km	MPC · JPL
729283	2011 CJ_{123}	—	September 25, 2014	Kitt Peak	Spacewatch	·	1.5 km	MPC · JPL
729284	2011 CL_{123}	—	November 19, 2009	Catalina	CSS	·	1.2 km	MPC · JPL
729285	2011 CJ_{125}	—	October 12, 1998	Kitt Peak	Spacewatch	·	1.7 km	MPC · JPL
729286	2011 CQ_{126}	—	February 27, 2010	WISE	WISE	·	2.2 km	MPC · JPL
729287	2011 CE_{127}	—	February 13, 2010	WISE	WISE	·	2.7 km	MPC · JPL
729288	2011 CK_{128}	—	February 10, 2011	Mount Lemmon	Mount Lemmon Survey	·	600 m	MPC · JPL
729289	2011 CQ_{128}	—	February 7, 2011	Mount Lemmon	Mount Lemmon Survey	·	2.2 km	MPC · JPL
729290	2011 CO_{130}	—	February 7, 2011	Mount Lemmon	Mount Lemmon Survey	·	820 m	MPC · JPL
729291	2011 CU_{130}	—	February 12, 2011	Mount Lemmon	Mount Lemmon Survey	·	2.5 km	MPC · JPL
729292	2011 CX_{130}	—	February 11, 2011	Mount Lemmon	Mount Lemmon Survey	·	1.0 km	MPC · JPL
729293	2011 CY_{130}	—	December 13, 2015	Haleakala	Pan-STARRS 1	·	2.4 km	MPC · JPL
729294	2011 CM_{132}	—	December 19, 2001	Apache Point	SDSS	·	1.2 km	MPC · JPL
729295	2011 CQ_{132}	—	February 12, 2011	Mount Lemmon	Mount Lemmon Survey	·	860 m	MPC · JPL
729296	2011 CK_{134}	—	August 25, 2014	Haleakala	Pan-STARRS 1	·	2.3 km	MPC · JPL
729297	2011 CD_{135}	—	February 5, 2011	Haleakala	Pan-STARRS 1	V	420 m	MPC · JPL
729298	2011 CU_{136}	—	December 20, 2004	Mount Lemmon	Mount Lemmon Survey	·	2.2 km	MPC · JPL
729299	2011 CM_{138}	—	February 7, 2011	Mount Lemmon	Mount Lemmon Survey	MRX	770 m	MPC · JPL
729300	2011 CO_{140}	—	February 10, 2011	Mount Lemmon	Mount Lemmon Survey	VER	2.1 km	MPC · JPL

== 729301–729400 ==
back to top

Designation			Discovery			Properties		Ref
Permanent	Provisional	Named after	Date	Site	Discoverer(s)	Category	Diam.	Ref
729301	2011 CT_{142}	—	February 9, 2011	Mount Lemmon	Mount Lemmon Survey	LIX	3.2 km	MPC · JPL
729302	2011 CO_{147}	—	February 8, 2011	Mount Lemmon	Mount Lemmon Survey	·	1.8 km	MPC · JPL
729303	2011 CO_{148}	—	February 5, 2011	Haleakala	Pan-STARRS 1	·	1.5 km	MPC · JPL
729304	2011 CK_{152}	—	November 18, 2009	Mount Lemmon	Mount Lemmon Survey	AGN	890 m	MPC · JPL
729305	2011 DN	—	February 22, 2011	Kitt Peak	Spacewatch	·	1.1 km	MPC · JPL
729306	2011 DT	—	February 23, 2011	Kitt Peak	Spacewatch	·	570 m	MPC · JPL
729307	2011 DN_{2}	—	October 24, 2003	Apache Point	SDSS Collaboration	·	2.6 km	MPC · JPL
729308	2011 DM_{4}	—	September 19, 2003	Palomar	NEAT	·	4.3 km	MPC · JPL
729309	2011 DH_{5}	—	February 12, 2000	Apache Point	SDSS	·	3.2 km	MPC · JPL
729310	2011 DO_{6}	—	February 25, 2011	Kitt Peak	Spacewatch	·	1.6 km	MPC · JPL
729311	2011 DR_{14}	—	February 8, 2011	Mount Lemmon	Mount Lemmon Survey	·	1.9 km	MPC · JPL
729312	2011 DR_{15}	—	February 25, 2011	Mount Lemmon	Mount Lemmon Survey	·	1.6 km	MPC · JPL
729313	2011 DV_{16}	—	January 24, 2007	Mount Lemmon	Mount Lemmon Survey	·	890 m	MPC · JPL
729314	2011 DC_{19}	—	February 26, 2011	Mount Lemmon	Mount Lemmon Survey	·	2.7 km	MPC · JPL
729315	2011 DK_{20}	—	October 2, 2009	Mount Lemmon	Mount Lemmon Survey	·	2.3 km	MPC · JPL
729316	2011 DX_{20}	—	January 15, 2011	Mount Lemmon	Mount Lemmon Survey	·	850 m	MPC · JPL
729317	2011 DJ_{21}	—	February 25, 2011	Mount Lemmon	Mount Lemmon Survey	·	3.1 km	MPC · JPL
729318	2011 DC_{28}	—	December 5, 2005	Mount Lemmon	Mount Lemmon Survey	HOF	2.1 km	MPC · JPL
729319	2011 DL_{28}	—	February 10, 2011	Mount Lemmon	Mount Lemmon Survey	ERI	1.1 km	MPC · JPL
729320	2011 DU_{33}	—	February 25, 2011	Mount Lemmon	Mount Lemmon Survey	·	1.9 km	MPC · JPL
729321	2011 DB_{35}	—	October 26, 2009	Mount Lemmon	Mount Lemmon Survey	·	2.3 km	MPC · JPL
729322	2011 DJ_{39}	—	March 12, 2000	Kitt Peak	Spacewatch	·	2.0 km	MPC · JPL
729323	2011 DU_{42}	—	January 28, 2011	Kitt Peak	Spacewatch	·	1.0 km	MPC · JPL
729324	2011 DQ_{44}	—	September 4, 2008	Kitt Peak	Spacewatch	EOS	1.7 km	MPC · JPL
729325	2011 DU_{44}	—	January 28, 2007	Mount Lemmon	Mount Lemmon Survey	·	920 m	MPC · JPL
729326	2011 DS_{45}	—	February 26, 2011	Mount Lemmon	Mount Lemmon Survey	THM	2.1 km	MPC · JPL
729327	2011 DM_{47}	—	March 16, 2007	Catalina	CSS	·	2.0 km	MPC · JPL
729328	2011 DN_{49}	—	March 20, 1993	La Silla	UESAC	·	1.2 km	MPC · JPL
729329	2011 DJ_{50}	—	October 26, 2009	Mount Lemmon	Mount Lemmon Survey	DOR	2.6 km	MPC · JPL
729330	2011 DB_{53}	—	February 25, 2011	Kitt Peak	Spacewatch	·	880 m	MPC · JPL
729331	2011 DV_{53}	—	January 26, 2011	Kitt Peak	Spacewatch	·	2.6 km	MPC · JPL
729332	2011 DC_{54}	—	February 11, 2010	WISE	WISE	·	4.0 km	MPC · JPL
729333	2011 DV_{54}	—	August 14, 2012	Haleakala	Pan-STARRS 1	·	910 m	MPC · JPL
729334	2011 DX_{54}	—	March 4, 2010	WISE	WISE	·	2.2 km	MPC · JPL
729335	2011 DH_{55}	—	December 14, 2015	Haleakala	Pan-STARRS 1	·	2.6 km	MPC · JPL
729336	2011 DB_{56}	—	February 26, 2007	Mount Lemmon	Mount Lemmon Survey	·	970 m	MPC · JPL
729337	2011 DY_{57}	—	February 25, 2011	Mount Lemmon	Mount Lemmon Survey	·	1.0 km	MPC · JPL
729338	2011 DP_{59}	—	February 25, 2011	Mount Lemmon	Mount Lemmon Survey	·	890 m	MPC · JPL
729339	2011 EO_{1}	—	January 28, 2011	Mount Lemmon	Mount Lemmon Survey	·	2.2 km	MPC · JPL
729340	2011 EG_{2}	—	July 30, 2008	Mount Lemmon	Mount Lemmon Survey	·	3.0 km	MPC · JPL
729341	2011 EM_{4}	—	April 1, 2010	WISE	WISE	·	2.8 km	MPC · JPL
729342	2011 EY_{4}	—	September 15, 2009	Kitt Peak	Spacewatch	·	1.2 km	MPC · JPL
729343	2011 EX_{8}	—	February 8, 2011	Mount Lemmon	Mount Lemmon Survey	·	610 m	MPC · JPL
729344	2011 ET_{10}	—	March 3, 2011	Charleston	R. Holmes	·	1.6 km	MPC · JPL
729345	2011 EQ_{11}	—	August 23, 2003	Cerro Tololo	Deep Ecliptic Survey	·	2.9 km	MPC · JPL
729346	2011 EQ_{12}	—	August 30, 2003	Haleakala	NEAT	·	4.1 km	MPC · JPL
729347	2011 ER_{19}	—	January 28, 2011	Kitt Peak	Spacewatch	·	690 m	MPC · JPL
729348	2011 ED_{20}	—	May 7, 2006	Kitt Peak	Spacewatch	LIX	3.1 km	MPC · JPL
729349	2011 ES_{20}	—	January 6, 2010	Mount Lemmon	Mount Lemmon Survey	·	3.4 km	MPC · JPL
729350	2011 ES_{29}	—	March 10, 2010	WISE	WISE	·	3.8 km	MPC · JPL
729351	2011 EP_{34}	—	March 4, 2011	Mount Lemmon	Mount Lemmon Survey	·	840 m	MPC · JPL
729352	2011 EU_{34}	—	January 29, 2011	Kitt Peak	Spacewatch	·	2.9 km	MPC · JPL
729353	2011 EC_{39}	—	March 2, 2011	Kitt Peak	Spacewatch	·	2.1 km	MPC · JPL
729354	2011 ES_{42}	—	March 5, 2011	Kitt Peak	Spacewatch	·	2.9 km	MPC · JPL
729355	2011 EP_{44}	—	September 18, 2003	Palomar	NEAT	·	3.2 km	MPC · JPL
729356	2011 EV_{46}	—	January 16, 2005	Bergisch Gladbach	W. Bickel	·	3.4 km	MPC · JPL
729357	2011 EO_{56}	—	March 12, 2011	Mount Lemmon	Mount Lemmon Survey	·	1.6 km	MPC · JPL
729358	2011 EQ_{56}	—	March 12, 2011	Mount Lemmon	Mount Lemmon Survey	EOS	1.4 km	MPC · JPL
729359	2011 EX_{56}	—	March 12, 2011	Mount Lemmon	Mount Lemmon Survey	EOS	1.6 km	MPC · JPL
729360	2011 EZ_{56}	—	March 3, 2010	WISE	WISE	·	2.2 km	MPC · JPL
729361	2011 ER_{57}	—	October 21, 2003	Kitt Peak	Spacewatch	·	2.3 km	MPC · JPL
729362	2011 ES_{59}	—	March 12, 2011	Mount Lemmon	Mount Lemmon Survey	·	2.9 km	MPC · JPL
729363	2011 EA_{60}	—	March 12, 2011	Mount Lemmon	Mount Lemmon Survey	·	2.0 km	MPC · JPL
729364	2011 EK_{60}	—	October 25, 2005	Kitt Peak	Spacewatch	V	590 m	MPC · JPL
729365	2011 EP_{60}	—	March 12, 2011	Mount Lemmon	Mount Lemmon Survey	·	960 m	MPC · JPL
729366	2011 EY_{61}	—	March 12, 2011	Mount Lemmon	Mount Lemmon Survey	·	1.9 km	MPC · JPL
729367	2011 ED_{62}	—	September 26, 2008	Kitt Peak	Spacewatch	·	2.7 km	MPC · JPL
729368	2011 EW_{62}	—	October 22, 2003	Apache Point	SDSS Collaboration	·	3.5 km	MPC · JPL
729369	2011 EL_{66}	—	February 5, 2005	Palomar	NEAT	·	4.2 km	MPC · JPL
729370	2011 EG_{67}	—	February 24, 2010	WISE	WISE	·	3.2 km	MPC · JPL
729371	2011 EK_{69}	—	April 9, 2002	Anderson Mesa	LONEOS	PAD	2.6 km	MPC · JPL
729372	2011 EQ_{69}	—	October 31, 2002	Kitt Peak	Spacewatch	·	3.9 km	MPC · JPL
729373	2011 EF_{71}	—	October 8, 2002	Anderson Mesa	LONEOS	·	3.6 km	MPC · JPL
729374	2011 EV_{72}	—	March 11, 2011	Kitt Peak	Spacewatch	·	2.5 km	MPC · JPL
729375	2011 EJ_{73}	—	March 10, 2011	Kitt Peak	Spacewatch	V	510 m	MPC · JPL
729376	2011 EQ_{74}	—	March 9, 2011	Moletai	K. Černis	·	3.4 km	MPC · JPL
729377	2011 EY_{76}	—	March 3, 2010	WISE	WISE	EUN	2.4 km	MPC · JPL
729378	2011 EY_{80}	—	February 25, 2011	Mount Lemmon	Mount Lemmon Survey	·	660 m	MPC · JPL
729379	2011 EX_{81}	—	October 22, 2003	Kitt Peak	Spacewatch	EOS	4.2 km	MPC · JPL
729380	2011 EW_{82}	—	February 25, 2011	Catalina	CSS	·	2.9 km	MPC · JPL
729381	2011 ER_{83}	—	February 23, 2011	Kitt Peak	Spacewatch	·	1.4 km	MPC · JPL
729382	2011 ED_{87}	—	September 7, 2008	Mount Lemmon	Mount Lemmon Survey	·	2.4 km	MPC · JPL
729383	2011 EQ_{88}	—	March 16, 2005	Catalina	CSS	·	5.4 km	MPC · JPL
729384	2011 EW_{89}	—	April 26, 2006	Kitt Peak	Spacewatch	·	1.9 km	MPC · JPL
729385	2011 EL_{90}	—	March 6, 2011	Mount Lemmon	Mount Lemmon Survey	THM	1.5 km	MPC · JPL
729386	2011 EF_{92}	—	November 26, 2014	Haleakala	Pan-STARRS 1	EOS	1.6 km	MPC · JPL
729387	2011 EG_{92}	—	March 14, 2011	Mount Lemmon	Mount Lemmon Survey	·	660 m	MPC · JPL
729388	2011 EL_{92}	—	April 18, 2012	Kitt Peak	Spacewatch	TIR	2.5 km	MPC · JPL
729389	2011 EP_{92}	—	April 20, 2012	Kitt Peak	Spacewatch	·	2.2 km	MPC · JPL
729390	2011 ES_{93}	—	January 29, 2010	WISE	WISE	·	1.1 km	MPC · JPL
729391	2011 EA_{94}	—	May 30, 2012	Mount Lemmon	Mount Lemmon Survey	·	1.8 km	MPC · JPL
729392	2011 EK_{94}	—	March 6, 2011	Mount Lemmon	Mount Lemmon Survey	·	2.4 km	MPC · JPL
729393	2011 EM_{95}	—	May 21, 2012	Haleakala	Pan-STARRS 1	·	2.6 km	MPC · JPL
729394	2011 EN_{95}	—	October 25, 2014	Mount Lemmon	Mount Lemmon Survey	·	2.2 km	MPC · JPL
729395	2011 EA_{96}	—	March 1, 2010	WISE	WISE	·	1.7 km	MPC · JPL
729396	2011 EB_{96}	—	September 3, 2013	Mount Lemmon	Mount Lemmon Survey	·	2.2 km	MPC · JPL
729397	2011 EJ_{96}	—	March 9, 2011	Kitt Peak	Spacewatch	·	1.1 km	MPC · JPL
729398	2011 EL_{96}	—	January 8, 2010	WISE	WISE	·	1.1 km	MPC · JPL
729399	2011 EX_{97}	—	March 2, 2011	Kitt Peak	Spacewatch	T_{j} (2.99) · 3:2	4.9 km	MPC · JPL
729400	2011 EL_{98}	—	June 17, 2015	Haleakala	Pan-STARRS 1	·	640 m	MPC · JPL

== 729401–729500 ==
back to top

Designation			Discovery			Properties		Ref
Permanent	Provisional	Named after	Date	Site	Discoverer(s)	Category	Diam.	Ref
729401	2011 EN_{98}	—	January 14, 2016	Haleakala	Pan-STARRS 1	·	2.2 km	MPC · JPL
729402	2011 EP_{98}	—	March 20, 2017	Haleakala	Pan-STARRS 1	EOS	1.7 km	MPC · JPL
729403	2011 ET_{100}	—	March 10, 2011	Kitt Peak	Spacewatch	·	2.4 km	MPC · JPL
729404	2011 EC_{104}	—	March 5, 2011	Mount Lemmon	Mount Lemmon Survey	·	1.0 km	MPC · JPL
729405	2011 EQ_{104}	—	March 13, 2011	Kitt Peak	Spacewatch	·	1.9 km	MPC · JPL
729406	2011 ET_{104}	—	March 4, 2011	Mount Lemmon	Mount Lemmon Survey	MAS	530 m	MPC · JPL
729407	2011 EQ_{105}	—	March 14, 2011	Mount Lemmon	Mount Lemmon Survey	·	1.5 km	MPC · JPL
729408	2011 EK_{107}	—	March 6, 2011	Mount Lemmon	Mount Lemmon Survey	·	910 m	MPC · JPL
729409	2011 EJ_{113}	—	March 14, 2011	Mount Lemmon	Mount Lemmon Survey	EOS	1.6 km	MPC · JPL
729410	2011 FA_{1}	—	February 25, 2011	Mount Lemmon	Mount Lemmon Survey	·	3.2 km	MPC · JPL
729411	2011 FU_{6}	—	March 26, 2011	Mount Lemmon	Mount Lemmon Survey	·	1.8 km	MPC · JPL
729412	2011 FK_{9}	—	March 27, 2011	Mount Lemmon	Mount Lemmon Survey	·	1.6 km	MPC · JPL
729413	2011 FB_{10}	—	April 11, 2010	WISE	WISE	·	2.9 km	MPC · JPL
729414	2011 FW_{15}	—	October 2, 2003	Kitt Peak	Spacewatch	·	2.5 km	MPC · JPL
729415	2011 FH_{16}	—	April 18, 2010	WISE	WISE	·	4.0 km	MPC · JPL
729416	2011 FB_{17}	—	September 21, 2008	Kitt Peak	Spacewatch	3:2	5.0 km	MPC · JPL
729417	2011 FA_{21}	—	March 31, 2010	WISE	WISE	·	3.5 km	MPC · JPL
729418	2011 FM_{26}	—	March 30, 2011	Piszkés-tető	K. Sárneczky, Z. Kuli	·	1.9 km	MPC · JPL
729419	2011 FK_{29}	—	March 30, 2011	Vitebsk	Nevski, V.	·	720 m	MPC · JPL
729420	2011 FV_{29}	—	March 11, 2005	Kitt Peak	Spacewatch	·	2.6 km	MPC · JPL
729421	2011 FD_{31}	—	March 3, 2000	Kitt Peak	Spacewatch	·	2.7 km	MPC · JPL
729422	2011 FZ_{35}	—	March 29, 2011	Mount Lemmon	Mount Lemmon Survey	·	2.2 km	MPC · JPL
729423	2011 FL_{39}	—	April 30, 2006	Kitt Peak	Spacewatch	·	2.6 km	MPC · JPL
729424	2011 FM_{41}	—	March 21, 2010	WISE	WISE	URS	3.1 km	MPC · JPL
729425	2011 FN_{41}	—	February 5, 2011	Mount Lemmon	Mount Lemmon Survey	·	2.4 km	MPC · JPL
729426	2011 FY_{42}	—	December 20, 2004	Mount Lemmon	Mount Lemmon Survey	·	2.5 km	MPC · JPL
729427	2011 FA_{43}	—	March 27, 2011	Mount Lemmon	Mount Lemmon Survey	·	2.5 km	MPC · JPL
729428	2011 FE_{48}	—	March 29, 2011	Mount Lemmon	Mount Lemmon Survey	·	820 m	MPC · JPL
729429	2011 FR_{49}	—	March 30, 2011	Mount Lemmon	Mount Lemmon Survey	·	2.4 km	MPC · JPL
729430	2011 FU_{51}	—	March 28, 2011	Mount Lemmon	Mount Lemmon Survey	·	760 m	MPC · JPL
729431	2011 FA_{53}	—	March 28, 2011	Kitt Peak	Spacewatch	·	1.8 km	MPC · JPL
729432	2011 FS_{55}	—	January 27, 2007	Kitt Peak	Spacewatch	·	770 m	MPC · JPL
729433	2011 FT_{56}	—	March 10, 2010	WISE	WISE	·	2.5 km	MPC · JPL
729434	2011 FJ_{57}	—	September 19, 2008	Kitt Peak	Spacewatch	·	820 m	MPC · JPL
729435	2011 FP_{60}	—	December 24, 2006	Kitt Peak	Spacewatch	MAS	520 m	MPC · JPL
729436	2011 FB_{61}	—	January 27, 2007	Kitt Peak	Spacewatch	·	840 m	MPC · JPL
729437	2011 FQ_{61}	—	March 30, 2011	Mount Lemmon	Mount Lemmon Survey	·	960 m	MPC · JPL
729438	2011 FU_{64}	—	September 23, 2008	Kitt Peak	Spacewatch	·	1.9 km	MPC · JPL
729439	2011 FL_{65}	—	August 11, 2001	Palomar	NEAT	·	5.1 km	MPC · JPL
729440	2011 FD_{66}	—	March 30, 2011	Mount Lemmon	Mount Lemmon Survey	V	500 m	MPC · JPL
729441	2011 FH_{66}	—	March 31, 2010	WISE	WISE	·	2.1 km	MPC · JPL
729442	2011 FC_{68}	—	March 27, 2011	Mount Lemmon	Mount Lemmon Survey	·	2.6 km	MPC · JPL
729443	2011 FF_{68}	—	October 20, 2008	Kitt Peak	Spacewatch	·	2.6 km	MPC · JPL
729444	2011 FX_{69}	—	March 16, 2007	Mount Lemmon	Mount Lemmon Survey	·	840 m	MPC · JPL
729445	2011 FT_{70}	—	November 26, 2009	Mount Lemmon	Mount Lemmon Survey	·	1.3 km	MPC · JPL
729446	2011 FC_{71}	—	March 6, 2011	Mount Lemmon	Mount Lemmon Survey	THM	2.1 km	MPC · JPL
729447	2011 FG_{72}	—	April 7, 2002	Cerro Tololo	Deep Ecliptic Survey	·	2.4 km	MPC · JPL
729448	2011 FK_{75}	—	September 7, 2008	Mount Lemmon	Mount Lemmon Survey	·	2.6 km	MPC · JPL
729449	2011 FG_{77}	—	January 23, 2006	Kitt Peak	Spacewatch	AGN	890 m	MPC · JPL
729450	2011 FL_{77}	—	March 31, 2010	WISE	WISE	·	2.9 km	MPC · JPL
729451	2011 FF_{79}	—	April 18, 2007	Kitt Peak	Spacewatch	PAD	2.0 km	MPC · JPL
729452	2011 FQ_{83}	—	March 30, 2011	Mount Lemmon	Mount Lemmon Survey	·	1.9 km	MPC · JPL
729453	2011 FO_{85}	—	November 21, 2009	Mount Lemmon	Mount Lemmon Survey	T_{j} (2.97) · 3:2	5.5 km	MPC · JPL
729454	2011 FL_{86}	—	October 24, 2003	Apache Point	SDSS Collaboration	·	3.1 km	MPC · JPL
729455	2011 FX_{88}	—	April 2, 2011	Mount Lemmon	Mount Lemmon Survey	·	2.3 km	MPC · JPL
729456	2011 FJ_{91}	—	March 10, 2011	Kitt Peak	Spacewatch	NYS	780 m	MPC · JPL
729457	2011 FS_{91}	—	March 28, 2011	Mount Lemmon	Mount Lemmon Survey	·	880 m	MPC · JPL
729458	2011 FQ_{92}	—	March 28, 2011	Mount Lemmon	Mount Lemmon Survey	·	2.0 km	MPC · JPL
729459	2011 FB_{95}	—	March 14, 2007	Kitt Peak	Spacewatch	·	880 m	MPC · JPL
729460	2011 FU_{95}	—	September 4, 2008	Kitt Peak	Spacewatch	·	3.3 km	MPC · JPL
729461	2011 FD_{97}	—	September 28, 2009	Mount Lemmon	Mount Lemmon Survey	·	980 m	MPC · JPL
729462	2011 FR_{97}	—	August 13, 2002	Palomar	NEAT	·	3.5 km	MPC · JPL
729463	2011 FP_{102}	—	February 11, 2010	WISE	WISE	·	2.9 km	MPC · JPL
729464	2011 FW_{102}	—	March 27, 2010	WISE	WISE	3:2	5.8 km	MPC · JPL
729465	2011 FA_{110}	—	September 29, 2008	Mount Lemmon	Mount Lemmon Survey	EOS	1.6 km	MPC · JPL
729466	2011 FV_{110}	—	December 10, 2009	Mount Lemmon	Mount Lemmon Survey	·	1.8 km	MPC · JPL
729467	2011 FD_{112}	—	October 17, 2003	Anderson Mesa	LONEOS	·	2.4 km	MPC · JPL
729468	2011 FE_{113}	—	July 29, 2008	Kitt Peak	Spacewatch	V	520 m	MPC · JPL
729469	2011 FF_{113}	—	November 26, 2009	Mount Lemmon	Mount Lemmon Survey	·	2.9 km	MPC · JPL
729470	2011 FQ_{115}	—	December 1, 2006	Mount Lemmon	Mount Lemmon Survey	·	630 m	MPC · JPL
729471	2011 FZ_{116}	—	April 2, 2011	Mount Lemmon	Mount Lemmon Survey	·	2.5 km	MPC · JPL
729472	2011 FL_{118}	—	April 2, 2011	Mount Lemmon	Mount Lemmon Survey	HYG	2.3 km	MPC · JPL
729473	2011 FM_{118}	—	April 1, 2011	Mount Lemmon	Mount Lemmon Survey	·	2.1 km	MPC · JPL
729474	2011 FH_{119}	—	April 1, 2011	Mount Lemmon	Mount Lemmon Survey	·	2.4 km	MPC · JPL
729475	2011 FY_{119}	—	September 23, 2008	Kitt Peak	Spacewatch	·	2.1 km	MPC · JPL
729476	2011 FJ_{120}	—	March 8, 2010	WISE	WISE	LUT	2.4 km	MPC · JPL
729477	2011 FH_{121}	—	April 5, 2011	Mount Lemmon	Mount Lemmon Survey	·	890 m	MPC · JPL
729478	2011 FY_{122}	—	October 28, 2008	Mount Lemmon	Mount Lemmon Survey	EOS	1.4 km	MPC · JPL
729479	2011 FE_{125}	—	April 2, 2011	Mount Lemmon	Mount Lemmon Survey	EOS	1.5 km	MPC · JPL
729480	2011 FB_{126}	—	April 6, 2011	Mount Lemmon	Mount Lemmon Survey	EOS	1.2 km	MPC · JPL
729481	2011 FS_{127}	—	March 2, 2010	WISE	WISE	·	2.5 km	MPC · JPL
729482	2011 FU_{128}	—	March 29, 2011	Mount Lemmon	Mount Lemmon Survey	NYS	770 m	MPC · JPL
729483	2011 FK_{131}	—	February 27, 2010	WISE	WISE	·	2.9 km	MPC · JPL
729484	2011 FO_{135}	—	April 7, 2006	Kitt Peak	Spacewatch	·	2.7 km	MPC · JPL
729485	2011 FJ_{139}	—	April 3, 2011	Nogales	Tenagra II	(16286)	1.9 km	MPC · JPL
729486	2011 FA_{140}	—	April 24, 2006	Kitt Peak	Spacewatch	·	2.5 km	MPC · JPL
729487	2011 FX_{141}	—	October 2, 2009	Mount Lemmon	Mount Lemmon Survey	·	1.6 km	MPC · JPL
729488	2011 FK_{144}	—	April 5, 2011	Mount Lemmon	Mount Lemmon Survey	·	2.2 km	MPC · JPL
729489	2011 FT_{144}	—	February 25, 2011	Kitt Peak	Spacewatch	·	650 m	MPC · JPL
729490	2011 FO_{145}	—	February 5, 2010	WISE	WISE	·	2.1 km	MPC · JPL
729491	2011 FX_{145}	—	March 13, 2010	WISE	WISE	·	2.9 km	MPC · JPL
729492	2011 FF_{146}	—	March 28, 2011	Catalina	CSS	TIR	3.1 km	MPC · JPL
729493	2011 FS_{149}	—	March 3, 2010	WISE	WISE	T_{j} (2.98)	3.7 km	MPC · JPL
729494	2011 FU_{150}	—	February 25, 1998	Haleakala	NEAT	·	2.0 km	MPC · JPL
729495	2011 FL_{155}	—	September 29, 2008	Mount Lemmon	Mount Lemmon Survey	EOS	1.7 km	MPC · JPL
729496	2011 FR_{155}	—	March 30, 2011	Mount Lemmon	Mount Lemmon Survey	MAS	550 m	MPC · JPL
729497	2011 FK_{156}	—	September 16, 2003	Kitt Peak	Spacewatch	·	2.0 km	MPC · JPL
729498	2011 FF_{157}	—	April 3, 2011	Bisei	BATTeRS	EUN	1.1 km	MPC · JPL
729499	2011 FS_{160}	—	October 18, 2012	Haleakala	Pan-STARRS 1	·	640 m	MPC · JPL
729500	2011 FT_{160}	—	September 1, 2013	Mount Lemmon	Mount Lemmon Survey	EOS	1.4 km	MPC · JPL

== 729501–729600 ==
back to top

Designation			Discovery			Properties		Ref
Permanent	Provisional	Named after	Date	Site	Discoverer(s)	Category	Diam.	Ref
729501	2011 FZ_{160}	—	March 26, 2011	Mount Lemmon	Mount Lemmon Survey	·	2.6 km	MPC · JPL
729502	2011 FL_{161}	—	September 14, 2013	Haleakala	Pan-STARRS 1	·	2.4 km	MPC · JPL
729503	2011 FA_{162}	—	March 22, 2011	Bergisch Gladbach	W. Bickel	·	1.8 km	MPC · JPL
729504	2011 FB_{162}	—	August 12, 2013	Haleakala	Pan-STARRS 1	·	1.9 km	MPC · JPL
729505	2011 FO_{163}	—	November 20, 2014	Haleakala	Pan-STARRS 1	·	2.1 km	MPC · JPL
729506	2011 FK_{164}	—	February 18, 2010	WISE	WISE	·	2.7 km	MPC · JPL
729507	2011 FK_{167}	—	March 30, 2011	Mount Lemmon	Mount Lemmon Survey	·	1.9 km	MPC · JPL
729508	2011 FT_{167}	—	March 25, 2011	Kitt Peak	Spacewatch	·	2.7 km	MPC · JPL
729509	2011 FZ_{167}	—	March 29, 2011	Mount Lemmon	Mount Lemmon Survey	·	2.2 km	MPC · JPL
729510	2011 FE_{172}	—	March 30, 2011	Mount Lemmon	Mount Lemmon Survey	EOS	1.5 km	MPC · JPL
729511	2011 GA_{2}	—	March 19, 2010	WISE	WISE	·	1.5 km	MPC · JPL
729512 Braga	2011 GN_{2}	Braga	April 1, 2011	Falera	J. De Queiroz	·	840 m	MPC · JPL
729513	2011 GN_{4}	—	March 11, 2011	Mount Lemmon	Mount Lemmon Survey	·	3.1 km	MPC · JPL
729514	2011 GB_{5}	—	April 22, 2002	Palomar	NEAT	·	2.1 km	MPC · JPL
729515	2011 GE_{7}	—	February 15, 2007	Catalina	CSS	·	980 m	MPC · JPL
729516	2011 GQ_{7}	—	April 2, 2011	Mount Lemmon	Mount Lemmon Survey	·	1.8 km	MPC · JPL
729517	2011 GX_{7}	—	August 18, 2002	Palomar	NEAT	·	3.6 km	MPC · JPL
729518	2011 GY_{14}	—	March 21, 2010	WISE	WISE	·	1.4 km	MPC · JPL
729519	2011 GR_{19}	—	April 2, 2011	Mount Lemmon	Mount Lemmon Survey	·	970 m	MPC · JPL
729520	2011 GK_{20}	—	April 2, 2011	Mount Lemmon	Mount Lemmon Survey	·	2.6 km	MPC · JPL
729521	2011 GF_{21}	—	April 8, 2010	WISE	WISE	·	2.3 km	MPC · JPL
729522	2011 GS_{21}	—	September 15, 2007	Mount Lemmon	Mount Lemmon Survey	·	2.3 km	MPC · JPL
729523	2011 GX_{23}	—	April 2, 2010	WISE	WISE	·	2.3 km	MPC · JPL
729524	2011 GV_{24}	—	October 8, 2008	Mount Lemmon	Mount Lemmon Survey	·	2.4 km	MPC · JPL
729525	2011 GE_{25}	—	April 20, 2007	Mount Lemmon	Mount Lemmon Survey	·	1.1 km	MPC · JPL
729526	2011 GQ_{28}	—	September 24, 2008	Mount Lemmon	Mount Lemmon Survey	EOS	1.7 km	MPC · JPL
729527	2011 GF_{29}	—	September 29, 2003	Kitt Peak	Spacewatch	NAE	2.2 km	MPC · JPL
729528	2011 GJ_{29}	—	January 17, 2007	Kitt Peak	Spacewatch	·	890 m	MPC · JPL
729529	2011 GL_{33}	—	March 12, 2010	WISE	WISE	·	2.3 km	MPC · JPL
729530	2011 GY_{35}	—	March 10, 2005	Mount Lemmon	Mount Lemmon Survey	·	2.9 km	MPC · JPL
729531	2011 GA_{36}	—	October 8, 2008	Mount Lemmon	Mount Lemmon Survey	·	1.5 km	MPC · JPL
729532	2011 GF_{36}	—	April 3, 2011	Haleakala	Pan-STARRS 1	·	3.3 km	MPC · JPL
729533	2011 GH_{36}	—	March 11, 2005	Kitt Peak	Spacewatch	·	3.4 km	MPC · JPL
729534	2011 GM_{36}	—	April 3, 2011	Haleakala	Pan-STARRS 1	·	950 m	MPC · JPL
729535	2011 GK_{38}	—	February 10, 2011	Mount Lemmon	Mount Lemmon Survey	·	1.9 km	MPC · JPL
729536	2011 GK_{39}	—	April 4, 2011	Mount Lemmon	Mount Lemmon Survey	·	1.8 km	MPC · JPL
729537	2011 GS_{40}	—	January 23, 2006	Kitt Peak	Spacewatch	·	2.0 km	MPC · JPL
729538	2011 GB_{41}	—	January 6, 2005	Catalina	CSS	·	2.4 km	MPC · JPL
729539	2011 GT_{42}	—	April 4, 2011	Mount Lemmon	Mount Lemmon Survey	·	1.5 km	MPC · JPL
729540	2011 GW_{49}	—	March 13, 2011	Mount Lemmon	Mount Lemmon Survey	·	1.1 km	MPC · JPL
729541	2011 GO_{51}	—	April 5, 2011	Mount Lemmon	Mount Lemmon Survey	·	570 m	MPC · JPL
729542	2011 GZ_{51}	—	April 5, 2011	Mount Lemmon	Mount Lemmon Survey	EOS	1.4 km	MPC · JPL
729543	2011 GC_{56}	—	April 4, 2011	Mount Lemmon	Mount Lemmon Survey	·	2.4 km	MPC · JPL
729544	2011 GH_{56}	—	January 8, 2010	Mount Lemmon	Mount Lemmon Survey	EOS	2.6 km	MPC · JPL
729545	2011 GC_{61}	—	May 1, 2010	WISE	WISE	·	3.6 km	MPC · JPL
729546	2011 GY_{62}	—	April 5, 2010	WISE	WISE	·	1.9 km	MPC · JPL
729547	2011 GG_{63}	—	April 1, 2011	Mount Lemmon	Mount Lemmon Survey	·	1.4 km	MPC · JPL
729548	2011 GT_{64}	—	April 13, 2011	Haleakala	Pan-STARRS 1	H	490 m	MPC · JPL
729549	2011 GQ_{66}	—	March 1, 2005	Kitt Peak	Spacewatch	T_{j} (2.99)	3.4 km	MPC · JPL
729550	2011 GV_{66}	—	April 13, 2002	Palomar	NEAT	·	2.6 km	MPC · JPL
729551	2011 GA_{73}	—	March 28, 2011	Kitt Peak	Spacewatch	·	2.3 km	MPC · JPL
729552	2011 GH_{74}	—	March 1, 2011	Mount Lemmon	Mount Lemmon Survey	·	730 m	MPC · JPL
729553	2011 GK_{75}	—	April 3, 2010	WISE	WISE	(895)	3.7 km	MPC · JPL
729554	2011 GO_{77}	—	April 18, 2010	WISE	WISE	LUT	3.7 km	MPC · JPL
729555	2011 GO_{81}	—	March 14, 2000	Kitt Peak	Spacewatch	·	3.3 km	MPC · JPL
729556	2011 GB_{82}	—	February 16, 2010	WISE	WISE	·	1.4 km	MPC · JPL
729557	2011 GN_{83}	—	April 14, 2011	Mount Lemmon	Mount Lemmon Survey	·	1.2 km	MPC · JPL
729558	2011 GU_{85}	—	February 25, 2011	Mount Lemmon	Mount Lemmon Survey	·	1.7 km	MPC · JPL
729559	2011 GM_{86}	—	October 1, 2008	Mount Lemmon	Mount Lemmon Survey	ELF	3.0 km	MPC · JPL
729560	2011 GA_{89}	—	September 6, 2008	Mount Lemmon	Mount Lemmon Survey	·	2.0 km	MPC · JPL
729561	2011 GX_{90}	—	April 5, 2011	Mayhill-ISON	L. Elenin	NYS	820 m	MPC · JPL
729562	2011 GW_{91}	—	December 7, 2015	Haleakala	Pan-STARRS 1	·	2.3 km	MPC · JPL
729563	2011 GB_{92}	—	March 2, 2010	WISE	WISE	KRM	1.7 km	MPC · JPL
729564	2011 GM_{92}	—	October 9, 2012	Mount Lemmon	Mount Lemmon Survey	·	660 m	MPC · JPL
729565	2011 GO_{92}	—	September 26, 2016	Haleakala	Pan-STARRS 1	·	1.1 km	MPC · JPL
729566	2011 GR_{92}	—	April 10, 2000	Kitt Peak	M. W. Buie	·	2.1 km	MPC · JPL
729567	2011 GV_{92}	—	January 18, 2016	Mount Lemmon	Mount Lemmon Survey	·	2.6 km	MPC · JPL
729568	2011 GD_{96}	—	May 11, 2010	WISE	WISE	·	2.9 km	MPC · JPL
729569	2011 GE_{96}	—	December 20, 2014	Haleakala	Pan-STARRS 1	·	1.9 km	MPC · JPL
729570	2011 GO_{96}	—	March 14, 2005	Mount Lemmon	Mount Lemmon Survey	EUP	2.6 km	MPC · JPL
729571	2011 GZ_{97}	—	March 21, 2015	Haleakala	Pan-STARRS 1	·	920 m	MPC · JPL
729572	2011 GO_{98}	—	March 31, 2010	WISE	WISE	·	2.0 km	MPC · JPL
729573	2011 GZ_{99}	—	April 2, 2011	Mount Lemmon	Mount Lemmon Survey	VER	2.1 km	MPC · JPL
729574	2011 GO_{100}	—	April 2, 2011	Mount Lemmon	Mount Lemmon Survey	·	2.7 km	MPC · JPL
729575	2011 GK_{105}	—	March 29, 2011	Mount Lemmon	Mount Lemmon Survey	·	1.6 km	MPC · JPL
729576	2011 HU_{1}	—	March 3, 2000	Apache Point	SDSS Collaboration	·	880 m	MPC · JPL
729577	2011 HB_{9}	—	September 25, 2008	Mount Lemmon	Mount Lemmon Survey	·	3.0 km	MPC · JPL
729578	2011 HL_{9}	—	April 19, 2007	Mount Lemmon	Mount Lemmon Survey	·	1.5 km	MPC · JPL
729579	2011 HM_{15}	—	February 21, 2007	Mount Lemmon	Mount Lemmon Survey	·	820 m	MPC · JPL
729580	2011 HN_{16}	—	October 27, 2008	Kitt Peak	Spacewatch	·	3.0 km	MPC · JPL
729581	2011 HU_{16}	—	March 29, 2011	Kitt Peak	Spacewatch	·	840 m	MPC · JPL
729582	2011 HO_{17}	—	October 5, 2002	Apache Point	SDSS Collaboration	·	2.5 km	MPC · JPL
729583	2011 HC_{18}	—	March 29, 2011	Kitt Peak	Spacewatch	·	2.8 km	MPC · JPL
729584	2011 HA_{20}	—	November 7, 2008	Mount Lemmon	Mount Lemmon Survey	(8737)	3.6 km	MPC · JPL
729585	2011 HT_{20}	—	April 27, 2011	Mount Lemmon	Mount Lemmon Survey	·	2.3 km	MPC · JPL
729586	2011 HS_{21}	—	October 16, 2003	Kitt Peak	Spacewatch	·	3.6 km	MPC · JPL
729587	2011 HP_{26}	—	February 21, 2003	Palomar	NEAT	PHO	2.6 km	MPC · JPL
729588	2011 HZ_{26}	—	November 1, 2008	Mount Lemmon	Mount Lemmon Survey	·	2.5 km	MPC · JPL
729589	2011 HU_{31}	—	October 2, 2000	Kitt Peak	Spacewatch	·	1.4 km	MPC · JPL
729590	2011 HH_{32}	—	April 20, 2010	WISE	WISE	·	3.9 km	MPC · JPL
729591	2011 HY_{34}	—	April 3, 2005	Palomar	NEAT	·	3.8 km	MPC · JPL
729592	2011 HS_{38}	—	November 3, 2008	Mount Lemmon	Mount Lemmon Survey	·	3.8 km	MPC · JPL
729593	2011 HB_{40}	—	April 11, 2011	Mount Lemmon	Mount Lemmon Survey	VER	2.2 km	MPC · JPL
729594	2011 HM_{41}	—	January 12, 2010	Mount Lemmon	Mount Lemmon Survey	·	2.5 km	MPC · JPL
729595	2011 HN_{42}	—	November 12, 2001	Apache Point	SDSS Collaboration	PHO	730 m	MPC · JPL
729596	2011 HQ_{42}	—	April 6, 2011	Mount Lemmon	Mount Lemmon Survey	·	2.5 km	MPC · JPL
729597	2011 HK_{45}	—	October 10, 2002	Apache Point	SDSS Collaboration	·	3.3 km	MPC · JPL
729598	2011 HR_{45}	—	April 28, 2011	Kitt Peak	Spacewatch	EOS	1.6 km	MPC · JPL
729599	2011 HW_{49}	—	October 7, 2008	Mount Lemmon	Mount Lemmon Survey	·	2.9 km	MPC · JPL
729600	2011 HK_{51}	—	February 13, 2004	Kitt Peak	Spacewatch	·	3.4 km	MPC · JPL

== 729601–729700 ==
back to top

Designation			Discovery			Properties		Ref
Permanent	Provisional	Named after	Date	Site	Discoverer(s)	Category	Diam.	Ref
729601	2011 HP_{51}	—	April 30, 2011	Kitt Peak	Spacewatch	·	2.5 km	MPC · JPL
729602	2011 HT_{53}	—	April 7, 2010	Mount Lemmon	Mount Lemmon Survey	·	5.0 km	MPC · JPL
729603	2011 HC_{58}	—	April 28, 2011	Haleakala	Pan-STARRS 1	·	2.7 km	MPC · JPL
729604	2011 HE_{60}	—	March 20, 1999	Apache Point	SDSS Collaboration	·	4.2 km	MPC · JPL
729605	2011 HE_{62}	—	April 13, 2010	WISE	WISE	·	3.5 km	MPC · JPL
729606	2011 HR_{62}	—	May 27, 2003	Anderson Mesa	LONEOS	·	1.4 km	MPC · JPL
729607	2011 HK_{65}	—	April 21, 2011	Haleakala	Pan-STARRS 1	·	900 m	MPC · JPL
729608	2011 HU_{65}	—	April 22, 2011	Kitt Peak	Spacewatch	MAS	530 m	MPC · JPL
729609	2011 HB_{67}	—	April 23, 2011	Kitt Peak	Spacewatch	·	910 m	MPC · JPL
729610	2011 HF_{68}	—	March 27, 2011	Mount Lemmon	Mount Lemmon Survey	·	2.9 km	MPC · JPL
729611	2011 HS_{77}	—	September 24, 2008	Mount Lemmon	Mount Lemmon Survey	·	2.1 km	MPC · JPL
729612	2011 HG_{79}	—	March 26, 2011	Mount Lemmon	Mount Lemmon Survey	EOS	1.7 km	MPC · JPL
729613	2011 HJ_{79}	—	March 13, 2011	Kitt Peak	Spacewatch	·	2.4 km	MPC · JPL
729614	2011 HF_{85}	—	September 23, 2008	Mount Lemmon	Mount Lemmon Survey	EOS	1.7 km	MPC · JPL
729615	2011 HS_{88}	—	August 27, 2008	Vicques	M. Ory	·	1.9 km	MPC · JPL
729616	2011 HS_{91}	—	March 21, 2002	Kitt Peak	Spacewatch	·	2.2 km	MPC · JPL
729617	2011 HA_{93}	—	March 29, 2011	Mount Lemmon	Mount Lemmon Survey	·	2.1 km	MPC · JPL
729618	2011 HX_{93}	—	April 26, 2011	Kitt Peak	Spacewatch	·	890 m	MPC · JPL
729619	2011 HE_{99}	—	September 23, 2008	Mount Lemmon	Mount Lemmon Survey	·	1.9 km	MPC · JPL
729620	2011 HR_{99}	—	October 25, 2008	Mount Lemmon	Mount Lemmon Survey	EOS	1.8 km	MPC · JPL
729621	2011 HB_{102}	—	April 2, 2010	WISE	WISE	·	1.9 km	MPC · JPL
729622	2011 HG_{104}	—	April 24, 2011	Mount Lemmon	Mount Lemmon Survey	·	3.4 km	MPC · JPL
729623	2011 HO_{104}	—	January 9, 2016	Haleakala	Pan-STARRS 1	·	2.7 km	MPC · JPL
729624	2011 HM_{105}	—	June 7, 2010	WISE	WISE	·	4.1 km	MPC · JPL
729625	2011 HO_{106}	—	April 29, 2010	WISE	WISE	·	3.0 km	MPC · JPL
729626	2011 HG_{107}	—	September 27, 2003	Kitt Peak	Spacewatch	EOS	1.5 km	MPC · JPL
729627	2011 HT_{109}	—	April 27, 2011	Mount Lemmon	Mount Lemmon Survey	·	1.8 km	MPC · JPL
729628	2011 HV_{111}	—	April 26, 2011	Kitt Peak	Spacewatch	·	2.3 km	MPC · JPL
729629	2011 JA_{1}	—	August 22, 1999	Catalina	CSS	·	2.0 km	MPC · JPL
729630	2011 JL_{1}	—	May 3, 2011	Mount Lemmon	Mount Lemmon Survey	EUN	1.1 km	MPC · JPL
729631	2011 JQ_{1}	—	March 28, 2011	Mount Lemmon	Mount Lemmon Survey	EUP	3.2 km	MPC · JPL
729632	2011 JU_{3}	—	September 11, 2007	Mount Lemmon	Mount Lemmon Survey	·	2.3 km	MPC · JPL
729633	2011 JZ_{6}	—	January 28, 2007	Mount Lemmon	Mount Lemmon Survey	·	860 m	MPC · JPL
729634	2011 JH_{8}	—	December 18, 2009	Catalina	CSS	·	4.2 km	MPC · JPL
729635	2011 JR_{9}	—	April 14, 2010	WISE	WISE	URS	2.9 km	MPC · JPL
729636	2011 JL_{11}	—	June 8, 2007	Vail-Jarnac	Jarnac	·	2.6 km	MPC · JPL
729637	2011 JN_{12}	—	May 8, 2011	Mayhill-ISON	L. Elenin	·	2.5 km	MPC · JPL
729638	2011 JM_{13}	—	October 3, 2006	Catalina	CSS	EUP	3.5 km	MPC · JPL
729639	2011 JM_{14}	—	January 16, 2004	Palomar	NEAT	ELF	4.0 km	MPC · JPL
729640	2011 JD_{18}	—	January 13, 2010	WISE	WISE	·	3.0 km	MPC · JPL
729641	2011 JE_{18}	—	May 1, 2011	Mount Lemmon	Mount Lemmon Survey	·	890 m	MPC · JPL
729642	2011 JH_{18}	—	November 3, 2008	Mount Lemmon	Mount Lemmon Survey	·	3.3 km	MPC · JPL
729643	2011 JJ_{18}	—	August 23, 2007	Kitt Peak	Spacewatch	·	3.0 km	MPC · JPL
729644	2011 JO_{19}	—	August 25, 2001	Kitt Peak	Spacewatch	·	630 m	MPC · JPL
729645	2011 JF_{22}	—	September 13, 2007	Mount Lemmon	Mount Lemmon Survey	·	2.6 km	MPC · JPL
729646	2011 JG_{25}	—	November 6, 2008	Kitt Peak	Spacewatch	·	2.4 km	MPC · JPL
729647	2011 JU_{25}	—	October 5, 2002	Apache Point	SDSS Collaboration	·	3.2 km	MPC · JPL
729648	2011 JD_{26}	—	February 22, 2007	Kitt Peak	Spacewatch	V	470 m	MPC · JPL
729649	2011 JL_{26}	—	January 20, 2004	Socorro	LINEAR	·	5.0 km	MPC · JPL
729650	2011 JP_{28}	—	May 2, 2010	WISE	WISE	·	3.8 km	MPC · JPL
729651	2011 JY_{29}	—	October 27, 2008	Kitt Peak	Spacewatch	·	2.7 km	MPC · JPL
729652	2011 JF_{36}	—	May 7, 2011	Mount Lemmon	Mount Lemmon Survey	·	2.5 km	MPC · JPL
729653	2011 JW_{37}	—	May 8, 2011	Kitt Peak	Spacewatch	·	3.0 km	MPC · JPL
729654	2011 KL	—	April 15, 2010	WISE	WISE	(7605)	3.4 km	MPC · JPL
729655	2011 KK_{5}	—	October 11, 2007	Kitt Peak	Spacewatch	·	2.5 km	MPC · JPL
729656	2011 KS_{12}	—	March 14, 2011	Mount Lemmon	Mount Lemmon Survey	·	760 m	MPC · JPL
729657	2011 KX_{12}	—	April 5, 2010	Mount Lemmon	Mount Lemmon Survey	EUP	2.9 km	MPC · JPL
729658	2011 KX_{18}	—	March 19, 2010	Mount Lemmon	Mount Lemmon Survey	·	3.5 km	MPC · JPL
729659	2011 KD_{21}	—	May 31, 2011	Mount Lemmon	Mount Lemmon Survey	·	2.4 km	MPC · JPL
729660	2011 KE_{25}	—	April 9, 2003	Palomar	NEAT	·	1.1 km	MPC · JPL
729661	2011 KZ_{27}	—	November 18, 2008	Kitt Peak	Spacewatch	·	2.8 km	MPC · JPL
729662	2011 KC_{28}	—	April 1, 2005	Anderson Mesa	LONEOS	·	4.0 km	MPC · JPL
729663	2011 KN_{28}	—	March 15, 2010	Catalina	CSS	·	4.7 km	MPC · JPL
729664	2011 KU_{30}	—	October 22, 2003	Apache Point	SDSS Collaboration	·	1.7 km	MPC · JPL
729665	2011 KM_{32}	—	March 22, 2001	Kitt Peak	Spacewatch	AGN	1.2 km	MPC · JPL
729666	2011 KR_{32}	—	May 31, 2011	Mount Lemmon	Mount Lemmon Survey	·	3.1 km	MPC · JPL
729667	2011 KX_{34}	—	May 24, 2011	Mount Lemmon	Mount Lemmon Survey	THB	2.6 km	MPC · JPL
729668	2011 KQ_{37}	—	May 21, 2011	Haleakala	Pan-STARRS 1	EUN	1.0 km	MPC · JPL
729669	2011 KZ_{37}	—	July 30, 2001	Palomar	NEAT	·	5.1 km	MPC · JPL
729670	2011 KX_{41}	—	May 24, 2011	Haleakala	Pan-STARRS 1	V	570 m	MPC · JPL
729671	2011 KK_{45}	—	May 22, 2011	Mount Lemmon	Mount Lemmon Survey	·	1.4 km	MPC · JPL
729672	2011 KF_{47}	—	May 31, 2011	Mount Lemmon	Mount Lemmon Survey	V	470 m	MPC · JPL
729673	2011 KC_{50}	—	March 17, 2010	WISE	WISE	·	2.7 km	MPC · JPL
729674	2011 KP_{55}	—	May 24, 2011	Haleakala	Pan-STARRS 1	·	2.0 km	MPC · JPL
729675	2011 KL_{58}	—	May 25, 2011	Mount Lemmon	Mount Lemmon Survey	·	2.0 km	MPC · JPL
729676	2011 LC	—	May 21, 2011	Mount Lemmon	Mount Lemmon Survey	·	1.7 km	MPC · JPL
729677	2011 LE	—	November 1, 2008	Mount Lemmon	Mount Lemmon Survey	·	1.4 km	MPC · JPL
729678	2011 LY_{3}	—	May 10, 2005	Anderson Mesa	LONEOS	EUP	5.1 km	MPC · JPL
729679	2011 LA_{4}	—	May 25, 2010	WISE	WISE	·	3.1 km	MPC · JPL
729680	2011 LZ_{5}	—	May 5, 2011	Mount Lemmon	Mount Lemmon Survey	·	1.7 km	MPC · JPL
729681	2011 LV_{6}	—	January 13, 2005	Kitt Peak	Spacewatch	·	2.8 km	MPC · JPL
729682	2011 LP_{7}	—	May 31, 2010	WISE	WISE	VER	2.9 km	MPC · JPL
729683	2011 LN_{10}	—	May 24, 2011	Haleakala	Pan-STARRS 1	·	2.6 km	MPC · JPL
729684	2011 LO_{11}	—	May 3, 2005	Catalina	CSS	·	4.5 km	MPC · JPL
729685	2011 LT_{11}	—	February 17, 2010	Mount Lemmon	Mount Lemmon Survey	·	2.4 km	MPC · JPL
729686	2011 LD_{12}	—	October 22, 2003	Kitt Peak	Spacewatch	·	3.4 km	MPC · JPL
729687	2011 LA_{14}	—	November 17, 2001	Anderson Mesa	LONEOS	H	610 m	MPC · JPL
729688	2011 LQ_{21}	—	June 2, 2011	Haleakala	Pan-STARRS 1	·	870 m	MPC · JPL
729689	2011 LO_{25}	—	May 16, 2010	WISE	WISE	URS	2.9 km	MPC · JPL
729690	2011 LP_{25}	—	April 29, 2010	WISE	WISE	·	2.1 km	MPC · JPL
729691	2011 LN_{29}	—	January 26, 2010	WISE	WISE	URS	3.2 km	MPC · JPL
729692	2011 LL_{30}	—	November 26, 2014	Haleakala	Pan-STARRS 1	·	3.3 km	MPC · JPL
729693	2011 LM_{30}	—	July 21, 2010	WISE	WISE	·	2.7 km	MPC · JPL
729694	2011 LQ_{30}	—	June 5, 2011	Mount Lemmon	Mount Lemmon Survey	V	570 m	MPC · JPL
729695	2011 LT_{31}	—	May 17, 2010	WISE	WISE	URS	2.6 km	MPC · JPL
729696	2011 MU_{2}	—	August 23, 2004	Kitt Peak	Spacewatch	·	800 m	MPC · JPL
729697	2011 MB_{3}	—	October 7, 2005	Mauna Kea	A. Boattini	·	1.1 km	MPC · JPL
729698	2011 MA_{4}	—	January 24, 2010	Bisei	BATTeRS	·	1.9 km	MPC · JPL
729699	2011 MT_{6}	—	July 28, 2003	Palomar	NEAT	·	2.9 km	MPC · JPL
729700	2011 MM_{8}	—	June 24, 2010	WISE	WISE	·	3.2 km	MPC · JPL

== 729701–729800 ==
back to top

Designation			Discovery			Properties		Ref
Permanent	Provisional	Named after	Date	Site	Discoverer(s)	Category	Diam.	Ref
729701	2011 MW_{8}	—	August 18, 2001	Palomar	NEAT	·	2.5 km	MPC · JPL
729702	2011 MK_{15}	—	June 27, 2011	Mount Lemmon	Mount Lemmon Survey	·	1.0 km	MPC · JPL
729703	2011 NU	—	April 14, 2010	Mount Lemmon	Mount Lemmon Survey	·	2.5 km	MPC · JPL
729704	2011 NA_{2}	—	May 9, 2006	Mount Lemmon	Mount Lemmon Survey	KON	2.7 km	MPC · JPL
729705	2011 NA_{4}	—	June 16, 2001	Kitt Peak	Spacewatch	·	4.8 km	MPC · JPL
729706	2011 NF_{4}	—	December 14, 2001	Kitt Peak	Spacewatch	·	4.0 km	MPC · JPL
729707	2011 NX_{6}	—	July 3, 2011	Mount Lemmon	Mount Lemmon Survey	L5 · (17492)	8.6 km	MPC · JPL
729708	2011 OW	—	February 13, 2002	Apache Point	SDSS Collaboration	·	1.7 km	MPC · JPL
729709	2011 OF_{2}	—	July 22, 2011	Haleakala	Pan-STARRS 1	·	1.4 km	MPC · JPL
729710	2011 OG_{2}	—	October 8, 2008	Mount Lemmon	Mount Lemmon Survey	·	700 m	MPC · JPL
729711	2011 OY_{5}	—	July 24, 2011	Haleakala	Pan-STARRS 1	·	2.5 km	MPC · JPL
729712	2011 OX_{9}	—	November 12, 2001	Apache Point	SDSS Collaboration	·	2.0 km	MPC · JPL
729713	2011 OK_{10}	—	July 27, 2011	Haleakala	Haleakala	EUN	810 m	MPC · JPL
729714	2011 OL_{12}	—	August 24, 2008	Kitt Peak	Spacewatch	·	550 m	MPC · JPL
729715	2011 OQ_{12}	—	September 2, 1995	Kitt Peak	Spacewatch	·	1.1 km	MPC · JPL
729716	2011 OU_{14}	—	September 5, 2007	Catalina	CSS	EUN	1.1 km	MPC · JPL
729717	2011 OL_{15}	—	July 26, 2011	Haleakala	Pan-STARRS 1	·	1.5 km	MPC · JPL
729718	2011 OK_{18}	—	July 25, 2011	Haleakala	Pan-STARRS 1	·	940 m	MPC · JPL
729719	2011 OE_{21}	—	February 8, 2010	WISE	WISE	·	3.0 km	MPC · JPL
729720	2011 OJ_{22}	—	June 12, 2011	Mount Lemmon	Mount Lemmon Survey	L5	10 km	MPC · JPL
729721	2011 OF_{23}	—	September 12, 2004	Kitt Peak	Spacewatch	V	400 m	MPC · JPL
729722	2011 OO_{23}	—	March 23, 2010	Mount Lemmon	Mount Lemmon Survey	KON	2.7 km	MPC · JPL
729723	2011 OP_{27}	—	July 28, 2011	Haleakala	Pan-STARRS 1	·	1.4 km	MPC · JPL
729724	2011 OY_{28}	—	July 28, 2011	Haleakala	Pan-STARRS 1	PHO	860 m	MPC · JPL
729725	2011 OG_{29}	—	July 29, 2011	Siding Spring	SSS	·	1.7 km	MPC · JPL
729726	2011 OC_{30}	—	August 13, 2007	XuYi	PMO NEO Survey Program	·	1.0 km	MPC · JPL
729727	2011 OH_{30}	—	March 9, 2003	Kitt Peak	Deep Lens Survey	·	4.1 km	MPC · JPL
729728	2011 OB_{32}	—	January 26, 2009	Mount Lemmon	Mount Lemmon Survey	·	2.8 km	MPC · JPL
729729	2011 OJ_{40}	—	September 13, 2007	Catalina	CSS	·	2.0 km	MPC · JPL
729730	2011 OG_{42}	—	May 26, 2007	Mount Lemmon	Mount Lemmon Survey	MAS	720 m	MPC · JPL
729731	2011 OK_{42}	—	October 4, 2002	Palomar	NEAT	DOR	2.6 km	MPC · JPL
729732	2011 OY_{42}	—	February 19, 2010	Kitt Peak	Spacewatch	NEM	2.6 km	MPC · JPL
729733	2011 OC_{43}	—	September 3, 2007	Catalina	CSS	·	2.5 km	MPC · JPL
729734	2011 OP_{43}	—	January 27, 2010	WISE	WISE	·	3.7 km	MPC · JPL
729735	2011 OF_{44}	—	May 23, 2001	Cerro Tololo	Deep Ecliptic Survey	·	1.3 km	MPC · JPL
729736	2011 OF_{45}	—	July 26, 2011	Haleakala	Pan-STARRS 1	centaur	20 km	MPC · JPL
729737	2011 OQ_{47}	—	September 18, 2007	Kitt Peak	Spacewatch	HOF	2.8 km	MPC · JPL
729738	2011 OS_{50}	—	April 12, 2010	Mount Lemmon	Mount Lemmon Survey	·	1.5 km	MPC · JPL
729739	2011 OO_{51}	—	September 16, 2004	Kitt Peak	Spacewatch	NYS	750 m	MPC · JPL
729740	2011 OU_{52}	—	January 28, 2004	Kitt Peak	Spacewatch	·	2.9 km	MPC · JPL
729741	2011 OX_{56}	—	December 16, 2004	Catalina	CSS	·	2.0 km	MPC · JPL
729742	2011 OC_{58}	—	August 11, 2007	Siding Spring	SSS	·	1.9 km	MPC · JPL
729743	2011 OG_{61}	—	February 8, 2010	WISE	WISE	·	2.9 km	MPC · JPL
729744	2011 OU_{62}	—	January 18, 2015	Haleakala	Pan-STARRS 1	·	2.7 km	MPC · JPL
729745	2011 OD_{70}	—	July 26, 2011	Haleakala	Pan-STARRS 1	·	2.5 km	MPC · JPL
729746	2011 OS_{70}	—	July 28, 2011	Haleakala	Pan-STARRS 1	L5	8.1 km	MPC · JPL
729747	2011 OY_{71}	—	July 28, 2011	Haleakala	Pan-STARRS 1	L5	7.9 km	MPC · JPL
729748	2011 OU_{72}	—	July 28, 2011	Haleakala	Pan-STARRS 1	·	1.9 km	MPC · JPL
729749	2011 OZ_{72}	—	July 28, 2011	Haleakala	Pan-STARRS 1	·	1.1 km	MPC · JPL
729750	2011 PT_{2}	—	October 8, 2007	Mount Lemmon	Mount Lemmon Survey	HYG	3.3 km	MPC · JPL
729751	2011 PZ_{2}	—	July 6, 2006	Lulin	LUSS	·	4.3 km	MPC · JPL
729752	2011 PG_{3}	—	May 17, 2010	WISE	WISE	·	1.3 km	MPC · JPL
729753	2011 PR_{10}	—	September 25, 2007	Mount Lemmon	Mount Lemmon Survey	·	1.6 km	MPC · JPL
729754	2011 PU_{11}	—	April 26, 2010	Mount Lemmon	Mount Lemmon Survey	·	3.2 km	MPC · JPL
729755	2011 PD_{14}	—	September 29, 2000	Anderson Mesa	LONEOS	·	3.5 km	MPC · JPL
729756	2011 PW_{15}	—	September 11, 2014	Haleakala	Pan-STARRS 1	L5	9.3 km	MPC · JPL
729757	2011 PN_{18}	—	November 11, 2016	Mount Lemmon	Mount Lemmon Survey	MAR	1.2 km	MPC · JPL
729758	2011 PQ_{20}	—	April 10, 2010	WISE	WISE	L5	9.9 km	MPC · JPL
729759	2011 QX	—	January 12, 2010	WISE	WISE	·	2.5 km	MPC · JPL
729760	2011 QD_{3}	—	August 19, 2011	Haleakala	Pan-STARRS 1	L5	8.6 km	MPC · JPL
729761	2011 QE_{6}	—	September 27, 2003	Kitt Peak	Spacewatch	·	1.1 km	MPC · JPL
729762	2011 QL_{8}	—	March 5, 2002	Kitt Peak	Spacewatch	·	1.5 km	MPC · JPL
729763	2011 QA_{15}	—	March 8, 2005	Mount Lemmon	Mount Lemmon Survey	·	2.8 km	MPC · JPL
729764	2011 QH_{15}	—	December 22, 2008	Kitt Peak	Spacewatch	(5)	1.2 km	MPC · JPL
729765	2011 QO_{16}	—	August 23, 2011	Front Royal	Skillman, D. R.	·	3.3 km	MPC · JPL
729766	2011 QJ_{18}	—	August 24, 2011	Haleakala	Pan-STARRS 1	·	1.2 km	MPC · JPL
729767	2011 QF_{19}	—	September 14, 2007	Mount Lemmon	Mount Lemmon Survey	·	1.1 km	MPC · JPL
729768	2011 QH_{22}	—	December 3, 2005	Mauna Kea	A. Boattini	·	1.4 km	MPC · JPL
729769	2011 QJ_{23}	—	July 8, 2005	Kitt Peak	Spacewatch	·	5.3 km	MPC · JPL
729770	2011 QU_{24}	—	October 4, 2002	Apache Point	SDSS Collaboration	·	2.2 km	MPC · JPL
729771	2011 QY_{26}	—	July 28, 2011	Haleakala	Pan-STARRS 1	MAR	900 m	MPC · JPL
729772	2011 QY_{31}	—	November 6, 2002	Palomar	NEAT	·	2.0 km	MPC · JPL
729773	2011 QU_{34}	—	August 19, 2006	Palomar	NEAT	·	6.0 km	MPC · JPL
729774	2011 QV_{35}	—	July 27, 2005	Siding Spring	SSS	·	3.0 km	MPC · JPL
729775	2011 QA_{36}	—	August 25, 2011	La Sagra	OAM	·	1.5 km	MPC · JPL
729776	2011 QN_{36}	—	March 17, 2005	Catalina	CSS	HNS	1.3 km	MPC · JPL
729777	2011 QJ_{39}	—	August 6, 2004	Palomar	NEAT	·	850 m	MPC · JPL
729778	2011 QO_{40}	—	August 29, 2011	Zelenchukskaya Stn	T. V. Krjačko, Satovski, B.	·	2.1 km	MPC · JPL
729779	2011 QA_{41}	—	May 12, 2010	Kitt Peak	Spacewatch	·	3.6 km	MPC · JPL
729780	2011 QN_{43}	—	March 19, 2010	Mount Lemmon	Mount Lemmon Survey	·	1.7 km	MPC · JPL
729781	2011 QD_{47}	—	August 30, 2011	Kitt Peak	Spacewatch	L5	6.7 km	MPC · JPL
729782	2011 QW_{47}	—	September 18, 1996	Haleakala-NEAT/GEO	NEAT	·	1.2 km	MPC · JPL
729783	2011 QB_{52}	—	January 7, 2010	Mount Lemmon	Mount Lemmon Survey	·	910 m	MPC · JPL
729784	2011 QV_{53}	—	August 24, 2011	Haleakala	Pan-STARRS 1	L5	5.9 km	MPC · JPL
729785	2011 QY_{55}	—	October 14, 2003	Palomar	NEAT	·	1.5 km	MPC · JPL
729786	2011 QV_{56}	—	August 28, 2011	Haleakala	Pan-STARRS 1	·	1.1 km	MPC · JPL
729787	2011 QE_{58}	—	August 30, 2011	Haleakala	Pan-STARRS 1	·	1.2 km	MPC · JPL
729788	2011 QH_{59}	—	October 19, 2003	Apache Point	SDSS Collaboration	KON	2.0 km	MPC · JPL
729789	2011 QA_{64}	—	August 31, 2011	Haleakala	Pan-STARRS 1	L5	6.5 km	MPC · JPL
729790	2011 QW_{65}	—	August 24, 2011	Haleakala	Pan-STARRS 1	GAL	1.6 km	MPC · JPL
729791	2011 QG_{66}	—	July 31, 2005	Palomar	NEAT	·	5.2 km	MPC · JPL
729792	2011 QA_{70}	—	December 18, 2007	Mount Lemmon	Mount Lemmon Survey	·	3.6 km	MPC · JPL
729793	2011 QQ_{70}	—	June 6, 2010	WISE	WISE	ADE	2.0 km	MPC · JPL
729794	2011 QF_{73}	—	August 18, 2011	Haleakala	Pan-STARRS 1	·	2.4 km	MPC · JPL
729795	2011 QS_{76}	—	October 7, 2004	Kitt Peak	Spacewatch	NYS	760 m	MPC · JPL
729796	2011 QX_{78}	—	September 15, 2007	Mount Lemmon	Mount Lemmon Survey	·	1.2 km	MPC · JPL
729797	2011 QW_{85}	—	June 11, 2010	WISE	WISE	·	1.4 km	MPC · JPL
729798	2011 QF_{86}	—	May 5, 2010	Mount Lemmon	Mount Lemmon Survey	·	1.5 km	MPC · JPL
729799	2011 QT_{87}	—	April 14, 2010	Mount Lemmon	Mount Lemmon Survey	·	2.1 km	MPC · JPL
729800	2011 QN_{88}	—	October 22, 2006	Mount Lemmon	Mount Lemmon Survey	EOS	1.6 km	MPC · JPL

== 729801–729900 ==
back to top

Designation			Discovery			Properties		Ref
Permanent	Provisional	Named after	Date	Site	Discoverer(s)	Category	Diam.	Ref
729801	2011 QD_{96}	—	May 3, 2005	Kitt Peak	Spacewatch	·	3.2 km	MPC · JPL
729802	2011 QE_{97}	—	June 28, 2005	Palomar	NEAT	·	3.5 km	MPC · JPL
729803	2011 QT_{99}	—	August 20, 2011	Haleakala	Pan-STARRS 1	PAD	1.3 km	MPC · JPL
729804	2011 QC_{101}	—	November 24, 2012	Kitt Peak	Spacewatch	EOS	1.3 km	MPC · JPL
729805	2011 QA_{106}	—	February 8, 2010	WISE	WISE	·	1.7 km	MPC · JPL
729806	2011 QG_{107}	—	August 20, 2011	Haleakala	Pan-STARRS 1	·	1.3 km	MPC · JPL
729807	2011 QT_{107}	—	April 19, 2010	WISE	WISE	L5	10 km	MPC · JPL
729808	2011 QF_{110}	—	August 20, 2011	Haleakala	Pan-STARRS 1	·	1.3 km	MPC · JPL
729809	2011 QW_{116}	—	August 24, 2011	Haleakala	Pan-STARRS 1	·	2.2 km	MPC · JPL
729810	2011 RL_{1}	—	August 28, 2011	Andrushivka	Y. Ivaščenko	·	1.1 km	MPC · JPL
729811	2011 RK_{4}	—	July 18, 2006	Siding Spring	SSS	DOR	2.4 km	MPC · JPL
729812	2011 RC_{9}	—	May 24, 2006	Kitt Peak	Spacewatch	·	970 m	MPC · JPL
729813	2011 RJ_{20}	—	April 6, 2002	Cerro Tololo	Deep Ecliptic Survey	·	780 m	MPC · JPL
729814	2011 RB_{29}	—	September 8, 2011	Haleakala	Pan-STARRS 1	EOS	1.6 km	MPC · JPL
729815	2011 RV_{31}	—	September 2, 2011	Charleston	R. Holmes	·	1.3 km	MPC · JPL
729816	2011 RP_{32}	—	September 4, 2011	Haleakala	Pan-STARRS 1	·	1.1 km	MPC · JPL
729817	2011 SM_{4}	—	September 14, 2007	Mount Lemmon	Mount Lemmon Survey	·	1.2 km	MPC · JPL
729818	2011 SE_{7}	—	September 18, 2011	Kitt Peak	Spacewatch	·	1.3 km	MPC · JPL
729819	2011 SH_{7}	—	September 18, 2011	Mount Lemmon	Mount Lemmon Survey	·	1.5 km	MPC · JPL
729820	2011 SL_{8}	—	March 17, 2009	Kitt Peak	Spacewatch	·	2.5 km	MPC · JPL
729821	2011 SF_{14}	—	July 15, 2005	Mount Lemmon	Mount Lemmon Survey	EOS	2.0 km	MPC · JPL
729822	2011 SR_{15}	—	September 19, 2011	Mount Lemmon	Mount Lemmon Survey	·	930 m	MPC · JPL
729823	2011 SM_{16}	—	September 13, 2007	Mount Lemmon	Mount Lemmon Survey	·	1.3 km	MPC · JPL
729824	2011 SK_{20}	—	September 20, 2011	Haleakala	Pan-STARRS 1	TIR	2.6 km	MPC · JPL
729825	2011 SW_{29}	—	June 30, 2005	Palomar	NEAT	·	3.7 km	MPC · JPL
729826	2011 ST_{31}	—	February 6, 2002	Kitt Peak	Deep Ecliptic Survey	NYS	1.2 km	MPC · JPL
729827	2011 SC_{32}	—	May 24, 2006	Vail-Jarnac	Jarnac	·	2.4 km	MPC · JPL
729828	2011 SE_{33}	—	November 11, 2004	Kitt Peak	Spacewatch	NYS	920 m	MPC · JPL
729829	2011 SB_{37}	—	October 17, 2003	Apache Point	SDSS Collaboration	H	370 m	MPC · JPL
729830	2011 SG_{39}	—	September 21, 2011	Kitt Peak	Spacewatch	·	2.3 km	MPC · JPL
729831	2011 SP_{39}	—	April 21, 2010	Siding Spring	SSS	ADE	2.7 km	MPC · JPL
729832	2011 SG_{41}	—	September 2, 2011	Haleakala	Pan-STARRS 1	·	1.3 km	MPC · JPL
729833	2011 SB_{49}	—	October 2, 1999	Kitt Peak	Spacewatch	·	700 m	MPC · JPL
729834	2011 SG_{49}	—	September 2, 2011	Haleakala	Pan-STARRS 1	·	1.1 km	MPC · JPL
729835	2011 SZ_{49}	—	September 18, 2011	Mount Lemmon	Mount Lemmon Survey	·	1.1 km	MPC · JPL
729836	2011 SK_{53}	—	September 29, 1995	Kitt Peak	Spacewatch	·	430 m	MPC · JPL
729837	2011 SW_{55}	—	December 17, 2007	Mount Lemmon	Mount Lemmon Survey	·	1.6 km	MPC · JPL
729838	2011 SY_{55}	—	February 1, 2009	Kitt Peak	Spacewatch	·	1.4 km	MPC · JPL
729839	2011 SD_{57}	—	March 3, 2009	Kitt Peak	Spacewatch	HNS	810 m	MPC · JPL
729840	2011 SL_{61}	—	September 20, 2011	Haleakala	Pan-STARRS 1	EUN	820 m	MPC · JPL
729841	2011 SX_{61}	—	September 18, 2011	Mount Lemmon	Mount Lemmon Survey	·	1.2 km	MPC · JPL
729842	2011 SG_{62}	—	September 2, 2011	Haleakala	Pan-STARRS 1	·	970 m	MPC · JPL
729843	2011 SZ_{63}	—	March 2, 2009	Mount Lemmon	Mount Lemmon Survey	·	4.1 km	MPC · JPL
729844	2011 SZ_{69}	—	September 24, 2011	Haleakala	Pan-STARRS 1	·	1.2 km	MPC · JPL
729845	2011 SK_{73}	—	August 28, 2005	Anderson Mesa	LONEOS	·	4.5 km	MPC · JPL
729846	2011 SU_{76}	—	September 16, 2003	Kitt Peak	Spacewatch	3:2 · SHU	3.7 km	MPC · JPL
729847	2011 SM_{78}	—	November 10, 2004	Kitt Peak	Spacewatch	3:2	3.3 km	MPC · JPL
729848	2011 SW_{90}	—	September 12, 2001	Kitt Peak	Spacewatch	·	480 m	MPC · JPL
729849	2011 SP_{91}	—	September 1, 2005	Palomar	NEAT	LUT	3.9 km	MPC · JPL
729850	2011 SO_{92}	—	October 1, 2002	Anderson Mesa	LONEOS	·	1.6 km	MPC · JPL
729851	2011 SN_{93}	—	August 31, 2011	Haleakala	Pan-STARRS 1	·	1.3 km	MPC · JPL
729852	2011 SO_{93}	—	October 7, 2007	Kitt Peak	Spacewatch	·	1.2 km	MPC · JPL
729853	2011 SU_{96}	—	October 21, 2008	Kitt Peak	Spacewatch	·	530 m	MPC · JPL
729854	2011 SS_{101}	—	September 24, 2011	Mount Lemmon	Mount Lemmon Survey	·	1.1 km	MPC · JPL
729855	2011 ST_{101}	—	October 9, 2007	Mount Lemmon	Mount Lemmon Survey	·	1.1 km	MPC · JPL
729856	2011 SG_{103}	—	September 11, 2002	Palomar	NEAT	JUN	1.4 km	MPC · JPL
729857	2011 SQ_{111}	—	July 10, 2010	WISE	WISE	·	2.1 km	MPC · JPL
729858	2011 SF_{112}	—	July 1, 2011	Mount Lemmon	Mount Lemmon Survey	·	1.2 km	MPC · JPL
729859	2011 SG_{112}	—	January 19, 2001	Kitt Peak	Spacewatch	MAR	1.3 km	MPC · JPL
729860	2011 SM_{114}	—	September 20, 2011	Catalina	CSS	H	540 m	MPC · JPL
729861	2011 SN_{115}	—	September 25, 2005	Palomar	NEAT	·	5.5 km	MPC · JPL
729862	2011 SQ_{121}	—	April 11, 2004	Palomar	NEAT	·	3.3 km	MPC · JPL
729863	2011 SA_{122}	—	October 5, 2002	Apache Point	SDSS Collaboration	·	1.4 km	MPC · JPL
729864	2011 SA_{124}	—	May 21, 2010	WISE	WISE	·	3.2 km	MPC · JPL
729865	2011 SZ_{125}	—	May 12, 2010	WISE	WISE	·	3.0 km	MPC · JPL
729866	2011 SX_{126}	—	August 28, 2002	Palomar	NEAT	JUN	1.2 km	MPC · JPL
729867	2011 SK_{128}	—	September 17, 2001	Kitt Peak	Spacewatch	·	530 m	MPC · JPL
729868	2011 SH_{131}	—	September 23, 2011	Haleakala	Pan-STARRS 1	·	1.3 km	MPC · JPL
729869	2011 SY_{131}	—	February 24, 2010	WISE	WISE	T_{j} (2.99) · EUP	3.6 km	MPC · JPL
729870	2011 SZ_{134}	—	September 18, 2011	Mount Lemmon	Mount Lemmon Survey	·	500 m	MPC · JPL
729871	2011 ST_{136}	—	August 30, 2005	Palomar	NEAT	LIX	4.0 km	MPC · JPL
729872	2011 SH_{138}	—	March 2, 2009	Kitt Peak	Spacewatch	·	3.2 km	MPC · JPL
729873	2011 SP_{140}	—	September 23, 2011	Haleakala	Pan-STARRS 1	·	940 m	MPC · JPL
729874	2011 SD_{141}	—	November 2, 2007	Kitt Peak	Spacewatch	·	1.3 km	MPC · JPL
729875	2011 SC_{147}	—	September 26, 2011	Mount Lemmon	Mount Lemmon Survey	·	1.5 km	MPC · JPL
729876	2011 SJ_{150}	—	September 26, 2011	Haleakala	Pan-STARRS 1	·	1.4 km	MPC · JPL
729877	2011 ST_{152}	—	April 4, 2005	Kitt Peak	Spacewatch	GEF	1.0 km	MPC · JPL
729878	2011 SN_{155}	—	November 8, 2007	Kitt Peak	Spacewatch	NEM	1.5 km	MPC · JPL
729879	2011 SD_{156}	—	September 26, 2011	Haleakala	Pan-STARRS 1	·	1.4 km	MPC · JPL
729880	2011 SW_{159}	—	August 19, 2006	Palomar	NEAT	·	3.2 km	MPC · JPL
729881	2011 SV_{161}	—	September 12, 1994	Kitt Peak	Spacewatch	LIX	3.8 km	MPC · JPL
729882	2011 SQ_{162}	—	December 5, 2007	Mount Lemmon	Mount Lemmon Survey	·	1.6 km	MPC · JPL
729883	2011 SO_{166}	—	April 24, 2010	WISE	WISE	·	2.9 km	MPC · JPL
729884	2011 SB_{167}	—	September 28, 2011	Les Engarouines	L. Bernasconi	·	1.8 km	MPC · JPL
729885	2011 SQ_{168}	—	November 19, 2007	Kitt Peak	Spacewatch	·	1.1 km	MPC · JPL
729886	2011 SQ_{173}	—	November 8, 2007	Kitt Peak	Spacewatch	MIS	2.1 km	MPC · JPL
729887	2011 SM_{177}	—	December 18, 2001	Kitt Peak	Deep Lens Survey	·	2.9 km	MPC · JPL
729888	2011 SS_{177}	—	October 8, 1999	Kitt Peak	Spacewatch	·	3.7 km	MPC · JPL
729889	2011 SZ_{177}	—	April 20, 2010	WISE	WISE	·	3.8 km	MPC · JPL
729890	2011 SS_{178}	—	October 17, 1995	Kitt Peak	Spacewatch	·	2.3 km	MPC · JPL
729891	2011 SU_{179}	—	September 26, 2011	Kitt Peak	Spacewatch	·	1.7 km	MPC · JPL
729892	2011 SW_{179}	—	March 8, 2005	Mount Lemmon	Mount Lemmon Survey	HNS	1.0 km	MPC · JPL
729893	2011 SG_{182}	—	July 9, 2011	Haleakala	Pan-STARRS 1	(1547)	1.5 km	MPC · JPL
729894	2011 SV_{182}	—	December 11, 2004	Kitt Peak	Spacewatch	NYS	760 m	MPC · JPL
729895	2011 SZ_{184}	—	September 26, 2011	Kitt Peak	Spacewatch	·	3.0 km	MPC · JPL
729896	2011 SX_{190}	—	September 10, 2002	Palomar	NEAT	·	1.7 km	MPC · JPL
729897	2011 SF_{195}	—	August 4, 2005	Palomar	NEAT	T_{j} (2.99)	4.5 km	MPC · JPL
729898	2011 SJ_{199}	—	November 19, 2007	Kitt Peak	Spacewatch	·	1.7 km	MPC · JPL
729899	2011 SO_{199}	—	September 18, 2011	Mount Lemmon	Mount Lemmon Survey	·	1.6 km	MPC · JPL
729900	2011 SP_{200}	—	September 18, 2011	Mount Lemmon	Mount Lemmon Survey	·	490 m	MPC · JPL

== 729901–730000 ==
back to top

Designation			Discovery			Properties		Ref
Permanent	Provisional	Named after	Date	Site	Discoverer(s)	Category	Diam.	Ref
729901	2011 SZ_{200}	—	August 27, 2011	Haleakala	Pan-STARRS 1	·	1.1 km	MPC · JPL
729902	2011 SF_{206}	—	June 10, 2010	WISE	WISE	·	1.4 km	MPC · JPL
729903	2011 SG_{206}	—	January 24, 2010	WISE	WISE	·	1.7 km	MPC · JPL
729904	2011 SM_{208}	—	April 18, 2009	Mount Lemmon	Mount Lemmon Survey	·	3.0 km	MPC · JPL
729905	2011 SF_{216}	—	September 4, 2011	Kitt Peak	Spacewatch	·	1.2 km	MPC · JPL
729906	2011 SG_{216}	—	September 20, 2011	Haleakala	Pan-STARRS 1	·	1.2 km	MPC · JPL
729907	2011 SU_{217}	—	October 2, 2006	Mount Lemmon	Mount Lemmon Survey	·	1.7 km	MPC · JPL
729908	2011 SO_{220}	—	March 17, 2009	Kitt Peak	Spacewatch	HNS	970 m	MPC · JPL
729909	2011 SW_{223}	—	April 20, 2007	Mount Lemmon	Mount Lemmon Survey	·	790 m	MPC · JPL
729910	2011 SY_{224}	—	September 4, 2011	Haleakala	Pan-STARRS 1	·	2.5 km	MPC · JPL
729911	2011 SG_{226}	—	February 25, 2009	Calar Alto	F. Hormuth	·	3.7 km	MPC · JPL
729912	2011 SH_{232}	—	September 30, 2011	Piszkéstető	K. Sárneczky	EUN	1.1 km	MPC · JPL
729913	2011 SG_{235}	—	April 3, 2010	WISE	WISE	·	3.1 km	MPC · JPL
729914	2011 SP_{236}	—	August 6, 2010	WISE	WISE	PHO	840 m	MPC · JPL
729915	2011 SZ_{238}	—	September 26, 2011	Mount Lemmon	Mount Lemmon Survey	·	820 m	MPC · JPL
729916	2011 SN_{242}	—	September 26, 2011	Mount Lemmon	Mount Lemmon Survey	·	2.0 km	MPC · JPL
729917	2011 SH_{243}	—	September 26, 2011	Haleakala	Pan-STARRS 1	·	1.6 km	MPC · JPL
729918	2011 SC_{244}	—	September 26, 2011	Haleakala	Pan-STARRS 1	·	2.3 km	MPC · JPL
729919	2011 SE_{244}	—	September 26, 2011	Haleakala	Pan-STARRS 1	·	1.5 km	MPC · JPL
729920	2011 SL_{246}	—	November 3, 2007	Kitt Peak	Spacewatch	·	1.3 km	MPC · JPL
729921	2011 SY_{250}	—	July 26, 2005	Palomar	NEAT	·	4.4 km	MPC · JPL
729922	2011 SP_{251}	—	February 28, 2009	Kitt Peak	Spacewatch	·	2.3 km	MPC · JPL
729923	2011 SL_{253}	—	August 29, 2005	Kitt Peak	Spacewatch	·	4.0 km	MPC · JPL
729924	2011 SP_{255}	—	November 19, 2007	Kitt Peak	Spacewatch	HOF	1.8 km	MPC · JPL
729925	2011 SX_{258}	—	December 18, 2007	Kitt Peak	Spacewatch	·	1.4 km	MPC · JPL
729926	2011 SQ_{261}	—	September 26, 2011	Haleakala	Pan-STARRS 1	·	1.5 km	MPC · JPL
729927	2011 SD_{270}	—	September 25, 1998	Kitt Peak	Spacewatch	·	1.1 km	MPC · JPL
729928	2011 SS_{271}	—	October 8, 2008	Kitt Peak	Spacewatch	·	510 m	MPC · JPL
729929	2011 SN_{272}	—	September 21, 2011	Haleakala	Pan-STARRS 1	·	2.7 km	MPC · JPL
729930	2011 SE_{274}	—	June 13, 2010	WISE	WISE	PHO	950 m	MPC · JPL
729931	2011 SA_{278}	—	September 21, 2011	Kitt Peak	Spacewatch	·	1.5 km	MPC · JPL
729932	2011 SO_{280}	—	September 29, 2011	Kitt Peak	Spacewatch	AST	1.3 km	MPC · JPL
729933	2011 SD_{281}	—	April 20, 2009	Mount Lemmon	Mount Lemmon Survey	·	2.5 km	MPC · JPL
729934	2011 SR_{281}	—	September 24, 2011	Haleakala	Pan-STARRS 1	EUN	890 m	MPC · JPL
729935	2011 SU_{281}	—	September 30, 2011	Kitt Peak	Spacewatch	·	1.2 km	MPC · JPL
729936	2011 SR_{283}	—	May 7, 2010	WISE	WISE	·	2.9 km	MPC · JPL
729937	2011 SG_{284}	—	September 21, 2011	Mount Lemmon	Mount Lemmon Survey	·	3.6 km	MPC · JPL
729938	2011 SL_{288}	—	March 26, 2010	WISE	WISE	·	3.8 km	MPC · JPL
729939	2011 SM_{295}	—	July 8, 2010	WISE	WISE	·	1.3 km	MPC · JPL
729940	2011 SB_{302}	—	May 6, 2010	WISE	WISE	·	2.1 km	MPC · JPL
729941	2011 SZ_{307}	—	September 20, 2011	Mount Lemmon	Mount Lemmon Survey	VER	2.5 km	MPC · JPL
729942	2011 SV_{308}	—	September 30, 2011	Kitt Peak	Spacewatch	·	1.4 km	MPC · JPL
729943	2011 SB_{309}	—	September 20, 2011	Haleakala	Pan-STARRS 1	·	2.6 km	MPC · JPL
729944	2011 SW_{311}	—	September 23, 2011	Haleakala	Pan-STARRS 1	·	1.8 km	MPC · JPL
729945	2011 SH_{312}	—	September 26, 2011	Mount Lemmon	Mount Lemmon Survey	·	1.4 km	MPC · JPL
729946	2011 SP_{314}	—	September 28, 2011	Mount Lemmon	Mount Lemmon Survey	·	1.3 km	MPC · JPL
729947	2011 SS_{317}	—	September 26, 2011	Mount Lemmon	Mount Lemmon Survey	HNS	920 m	MPC · JPL
729948	2011 SL_{320}	—	September 24, 2011	Haleakala	Pan-STARRS 1	·	1.5 km	MPC · JPL
729949	2011 SS_{321}	—	September 29, 2011	Mount Lemmon	Mount Lemmon Survey	·	1.3 km	MPC · JPL
729950	2011 SS_{322}	—	September 24, 2011	Haleakala	Pan-STARRS 1	·	1.7 km	MPC · JPL
729951	2011 SV_{322}	—	September 26, 2011	Mount Lemmon	Mount Lemmon Survey	·	1.2 km	MPC · JPL
729952	2011 SS_{324}	—	September 26, 2011	Kitt Peak	Spacewatch	·	1.3 km	MPC · JPL
729953	2011 SV_{325}	—	September 26, 2011	Haleakala	Pan-STARRS 1	·	1.1 km	MPC · JPL
729954	2011 TT_{6}	—	April 13, 2010	WISE	WISE	·	3.0 km	MPC · JPL
729955	2011 TT_{12}	—	November 17, 2006	Kitt Peak	Spacewatch	VER	2.9 km	MPC · JPL
729956	2011 TW_{14}	—	September 28, 2002	Haleakala	NEAT	·	2.2 km	MPC · JPL
729957	2011 TE_{15}	—	October 1, 2011	Mount Lemmon	Mount Lemmon Survey	·	1.6 km	MPC · JPL
729958	2011 TQ_{20}	—	October 1, 2011	Kitt Peak	Spacewatch	·	1.2 km	MPC · JPL
729959	2011 UN_{1}	—	April 1, 2009	Kitt Peak	Spacewatch	·	2.9 km	MPC · JPL
729960	2011 UE_{5}	—	September 22, 2011	Kitt Peak	Spacewatch	·	1.2 km	MPC · JPL
729961	2011 UX_{6}	—	October 18, 2011	Mount Lemmon	Mount Lemmon Survey	·	1.4 km	MPC · JPL
729962	2011 UW_{14}	—	October 1, 2011	Kitt Peak	Spacewatch	·	540 m	MPC · JPL
729963	2011 UU_{15}	—	August 5, 2002	Palomar	NEAT	T_{j} (2.98) · 3:2	3.4 km	MPC · JPL
729964	2011 UL_{18}	—	September 23, 2011	Kitt Peak	Spacewatch	·	1.4 km	MPC · JPL
729965	2011 UC_{21}	—	October 19, 2011	Haleakala	Pan-STARRS 1	H	450 m	MPC · JPL
729966	2011 US_{21}	—	December 17, 2003	Kitt Peak	Spacewatch	(5)	1.3 km	MPC · JPL
729967	2011 UE_{22}	—	October 7, 2007	Kitt Peak	Spacewatch	·	970 m	MPC · JPL
729968	2011 UJ_{25}	—	October 8, 1994	Kitt Peak	Spacewatch	·	2.4 km	MPC · JPL
729969	2011 UX_{25}	—	October 5, 2002	Apache Point	SDSS Collaboration	·	1.6 km	MPC · JPL
729970	2011 UY_{29}	—	May 12, 2010	WISE	WISE	3:2 · SHU	4.4 km	MPC · JPL
729971	2011 UJ_{37}	—	August 29, 2005	Palomar	NEAT	EUP	3.6 km	MPC · JPL
729972	2011 UG_{45}	—	October 5, 2002	Apache Point	SDSS	·	2.1 km	MPC · JPL
729973	2011 UJ_{47}	—	July 9, 2002	Palomar	NEAT	MAR	1.2 km	MPC · JPL
729974	2011 UN_{50}	—	October 2, 2006	Mount Lemmon	Mount Lemmon Survey	·	1.5 km	MPC · JPL
729975	2011 UG_{51}	—	September 20, 2007	Kitt Peak	Spacewatch	·	940 m	MPC · JPL
729976	2011 UH_{56}	—	October 18, 2011	Mount Lemmon	Mount Lemmon Survey	·	1.2 km	MPC · JPL
729977	2011 UZ_{59}	—	December 1, 2008	Kitt Peak	Spacewatch	·	1.9 km	MPC · JPL
729978	2011 UB_{60}	—	October 21, 2011	Mount Lemmon	Mount Lemmon Survey	·	2.9 km	MPC · JPL
729979	2011 UW_{60}	—	June 13, 2005	Mount Lemmon	Mount Lemmon Survey	EOS	1.8 km	MPC · JPL
729980	2011 UK_{66}	—	October 10, 2002	Apache Point	SDSS Collaboration	·	1.3 km	MPC · JPL
729981	2011 UZ_{69}	—	August 6, 2010	WISE	WISE	·	1.4 km	MPC · JPL
729982	2011 UN_{70}	—	October 23, 2003	Apache Point	SDSS Collaboration	EUN	1.5 km	MPC · JPL
729983	2011 US_{74}	—	September 20, 2011	Mount Lemmon	Mount Lemmon Survey	·	1.2 km	MPC · JPL
729984	2011 UZ_{75}	—	September 1, 2005	Palomar	NEAT	·	3.3 km	MPC · JPL
729985	2011 UD_{76}	—	December 17, 2007	Mount Lemmon	Mount Lemmon Survey	·	1.4 km	MPC · JPL
729986	2011 UG_{76}	—	October 19, 2011	Kitt Peak	Spacewatch	·	560 m	MPC · JPL
729987	2011 UD_{77}	—	September 28, 2006	Mount Lemmon	Mount Lemmon Survey	·	1.9 km	MPC · JPL
729988	2011 UN_{85}	—	July 30, 2005	Palomar	NEAT	·	2.0 km	MPC · JPL
729989	2011 UH_{87}	—	March 9, 2005	Mount Lemmon	Mount Lemmon Survey	MIS	2.7 km	MPC · JPL
729990	2011 UY_{91}	—	June 27, 2005	Palomar	NEAT	·	3.4 km	MPC · JPL
729991	2011 UT_{92}	—	October 18, 2011	Mount Lemmon	Mount Lemmon Survey	·	2.5 km	MPC · JPL
729992	2011 UP_{95}	—	September 11, 2002	Haleakala	NEAT	·	1.7 km	MPC · JPL
729993	2011 UR_{96}	—	May 27, 2010	WISE	WISE	EUP	3.3 km	MPC · JPL
729994	2011 UU_{105}	—	October 22, 2011	Mount Lemmon	Mount Lemmon Survey	·	1.2 km	MPC · JPL
729995	2011 UB_{107}	—	October 19, 2011	Haleakala	Pan-STARRS 1	·	2.2 km	MPC · JPL
729996	2011 UB_{109}	—	March 10, 2008	Siding Spring	SSS	EUP	4.8 km	MPC · JPL
729997	2011 UV_{109}	—	December 18, 1995	Kitt Peak	Spacewatch	·	2.9 km	MPC · JPL
729998	2011 UB_{110}	—	October 11, 2006	Palomar	NEAT	·	2.5 km	MPC · JPL
729999	2011 UQ_{126}	—	October 30, 2007	Mount Lemmon	Mount Lemmon Survey	·	870 m	MPC · JPL
730000	2011 UB_{128}	—	October 20, 2011	Mount Lemmon	Mount Lemmon Survey	EUN	940 m	MPC · JPL

back to top

== Meaning of names ==
As minor planet discoveries are confirmed, they are given a permanent number by the IAU's Minor Planet Center (MPC), and the discoverers can then submit names for them, following the IAU's naming conventions. The list below concerns those minor planets in the specified number-range that have received names, and explains the meanings of those names.

Official naming citations of newly named small Solar System bodies are approved and published in a bulletin by IAU's Working Group for Small Bodies Nomenclature (WGSBN). Before May 2021, citations were published in MPC's Minor Planet Circulars for many decades. Recent citations can also be found on the JPL Small-Body Database (SBDB). Until his death in 2016, German astronomer Lutz D. Schmadel compiled these citations into the Dictionary of Minor Planet Names (DMP) and regularly updated the collection.

Based on Paul Herget's The Names of the Minor Planets, Schmadel also researched the unclear origin of numerous asteroids, most of which had been named prior to World War II. This article incorporates text from this source, which is in the public domain: SBDB New namings may only be added to this list below after official publication as the preannouncement of names is condemned. The WGSBN publishes a comprehensive guideline for the naming rules of non-cometary small Solar System bodies.

Named minor planet	Provisional	This minor planet was named for...	Ref · Catalog
729512 Braga	2011 GN_{2}	Braga, one of the oldest cities in Portugal, founded as Bracara Augusta by the Romans in 16 BCE.	IAU · 729512
