= List of minor planets: 519001–520000 =

The following is a partial list of minor planets, running from minor-planet number 519001 through 520000, inclusive. The primary data for this and other partial lists is based on JPL's "Small-Body Orbital Elements" and data available from the Minor Planet Center. Critical list information is also provided by the MPC, unless otherwise specified from Lowell Observatory. A detailed description of the table's columns and additional sources are given on the main page including a complete list of every page in this series, and a statistical break-up on the dynamical classification of minor planets.

Also see the summary list of all named bodies in numerical and alphabetical order, and the corresponding naming citations for the number range of this particular list. New namings may only be added to this list after official publication, as the preannouncement of names is condemned by the Working Group for Small Bodies Nomenclature of the International Astronomical Union.

Near-Earth obj.	MBA (inner)	MBA (outer)	Centaur
Mars-crosser	MBA (middle)	Jupiter trojan	Trans-Neptunian obj.
Unclassified

== 519001–519100 ==
Designation			Discovery			Properties		Ref
Permanent	Provisional	Named after	Date	Site	Discoverer(s)	Category	Diam.	Ref
519001	2010 JQ_{69}	—	May 9, 2010	WISE	WISE	·	3.4 km	MPC · JPL
519002	2010 JD_{70}	—	May 9, 2010	WISE	WISE	ELF	3.8 km	MPC · JPL
519003	2010 JN_{70}	—	May 9, 2010	WISE	WISE	·	3.9 km	MPC · JPL
519004	2010 JP_{92}	—	May 10, 2010	WISE	WISE	·	2.8 km	MPC · JPL
519005	2010 JA_{93}	—	May 10, 2010	WISE	WISE	·	3.3 km	MPC · JPL
519006	2010 JX_{94}	—	May 10, 2010	WISE	WISE	EUN	3.0 km	MPC · JPL
519007	2010 JG_{95}	—	May 10, 2010	WISE	WISE	·	4.3 km	MPC · JPL
519008	2010 JB_{96}	—	May 15, 2009	Kitt Peak	Spacewatch	·	4.0 km	MPC · JPL
519009	2010 JG_{97}	—	November 7, 2008	Mount Lemmon	Mount Lemmon Survey	·	1.3 km	MPC · JPL
519010	2010 JF_{98}	—	September 11, 2007	Catalina	CSS	EMA	4.3 km	MPC · JPL
519011	2010 JV_{98}	—	September 12, 2007	Kitt Peak	Spacewatch	·	3.9 km	MPC · JPL
519012	2010 JK_{102}	—	May 24, 2006	Mount Lemmon	Mount Lemmon Survey	·	3.3 km	MPC · JPL
519013	2010 JD_{103}	—	May 11, 2010	WISE	WISE	·	3.9 km	MPC · JPL
519014	2010 JO_{108}	—	April 24, 2006	Kitt Peak	Spacewatch	·	1.9 km	MPC · JPL
519015	2010 JO_{109}	—	April 1, 2008	Catalina	CSS	·	5.2 km	MPC · JPL
519016	2010 JX_{113}	—	May 7, 2010	Mount Lemmon	Mount Lemmon Survey	·	3.0 km	MPC · JPL
519017	2010 JM_{115}	—	April 1, 2005	Kitt Peak	Spacewatch	·	2.1 km	MPC · JPL
519018	2010 JD_{116}	—	May 7, 2010	Mount Lemmon	Mount Lemmon Survey	·	1.4 km	MPC · JPL
519019	2010 JV_{130}	—	February 15, 2010	Catalina	CSS	·	2.4 km	MPC · JPL
519020	2010 JC_{131}	—	May 13, 2010	WISE	WISE	LIX	3.2 km	MPC · JPL
519021	2010 JH_{132}	—	May 13, 2010	WISE	WISE	T_{j} (2.98)	2.4 km	MPC · JPL
519022	2010 JS_{132}	—	September 19, 2007	Kitt Peak	Spacewatch	·	1.8 km	MPC · JPL
519023	2010 JG_{134}	—	May 14, 2010	WISE	WISE	·	2.6 km	MPC · JPL
519024	2010 JF_{135}	—	December 1, 2008	Kitt Peak	Spacewatch	·	3.2 km	MPC · JPL
519025	2010 JC_{137}	—	May 14, 2010	WISE	WISE	·	2.9 km	MPC · JPL
519026	2010 JP_{137}	—	May 14, 2010	WISE	WISE	·	2.2 km	MPC · JPL
519027	2010 JX_{138}	—	February 7, 2008	Kitt Peak	Spacewatch	·	4.6 km	MPC · JPL
519028	2010 JG_{141}	—	September 9, 2007	Kitt Peak	Spacewatch	·	4.5 km	MPC · JPL
519029	2010 JE_{143}	—	November 17, 2006	Kitt Peak	Spacewatch	·	2.4 km	MPC · JPL
519030	2010 JT_{145}	—	March 10, 2005	Kitt Peak	Spacewatch	EUP	3.4 km	MPC · JPL
519031	2010 JR_{146}	—	May 15, 2010	WISE	WISE	·	1.8 km	MPC · JPL
519032	2010 JR_{156}	—	May 11, 2010	Mount Lemmon	Mount Lemmon Survey	EOS	1.2 km	MPC · JPL
519033	2010 JZ_{167}	—	May 11, 2010	Mount Lemmon	Mount Lemmon Survey	·	1.5 km	MPC · JPL
519034	2010 KG_{5}	—	May 3, 2009	Kitt Peak	Spacewatch	·	3.8 km	MPC · JPL
519035	2010 KJ_{5}	—	May 16, 2010	WISE	WISE	T_{j} (2.99)	3.9 km	MPC · JPL
519036	2010 KM_{11}	—	May 17, 2010	WISE	WISE	·	4.5 km	MPC · JPL
519037	2010 KA_{13}	—	May 16, 2010	WISE	WISE	·	3.0 km	MPC · JPL
519038	2010 KJ_{14}	—	May 16, 2010	WISE	WISE	·	4.7 km	MPC · JPL
519039	2010 KO_{18}	—	May 17, 2010	WISE	WISE	LIX	2.8 km	MPC · JPL
519040	2010 KC_{22}	—	March 31, 2009	Mount Lemmon	Mount Lemmon Survey	NAE	3.1 km	MPC · JPL
519041	2010 KH_{27}	—	May 18, 2010	WISE	WISE	T_{j} (2.98)	3.3 km	MPC · JPL
519042	2010 KV_{30}	—	April 14, 2005	Kitt Peak	Spacewatch	LUT	3.3 km	MPC · JPL
519043	2010 KG_{31}	—	February 9, 2008	Mount Lemmon	Mount Lemmon Survey	·	3.3 km	MPC · JPL
519044	2010 KD_{32}	—	May 19, 2010	WISE	WISE	·	1.8 km	MPC · JPL
519045	2010 KE_{33}	—	May 19, 2010	WISE	WISE	·	1.9 km	MPC · JPL
519046	2010 KU_{35}	—	May 19, 2010	WISE	WISE	·	3.1 km	MPC · JPL
519047	2010 KZ_{46}	—	May 21, 2010	WISE	WISE	·	3.8 km	MPC · JPL
519048	2010 KM_{48}	—	January 30, 2008	Kitt Peak	Spacewatch	THM	2.6 km	MPC · JPL
519049	2010 KO_{50}	—	October 1, 2005	Mount Lemmon	Mount Lemmon Survey	·	2.8 km	MPC · JPL
519050	2010 KA_{54}	—	November 18, 2006	Kitt Peak	Spacewatch	·	3.3 km	MPC · JPL
519051	2010 KC_{75}	—	May 25, 2010	WISE	WISE	·	2.1 km	MPC · JPL
519052	2010 KX_{79}	—	March 15, 2004	Kitt Peak	Spacewatch	·	2.4 km	MPC · JPL
519053	2010 KH_{83}	—	May 26, 2010	WISE	WISE	·	2.9 km	MPC · JPL
519054	2010 KC_{84}	—	September 12, 2007	Mount Lemmon	Mount Lemmon Survey	·	4.5 km	MPC · JPL
519055	2010 KM_{84}	—	May 26, 2010	WISE	WISE	·	4.1 km	MPC · JPL
519056	2010 KB_{86}	—	January 20, 2015	Haleakala	Pan-STARRS 1	·	2.4 km	MPC · JPL
519057	2010 KU_{87}	—	December 15, 2006	Kitt Peak	Spacewatch	·	4.0 km	MPC · JPL
519058	2010 KY_{92}	—	May 27, 2010	WISE	WISE	THM	2.3 km	MPC · JPL
519059	2010 KV_{98}	—	March 4, 2010	Catalina	CSS	ADE	2.2 km	MPC · JPL
519060	2010 KM_{104}	—	December 29, 2003	Kitt Peak	Spacewatch	LIX	2.3 km	MPC · JPL
519061	2010 KP_{106}	—	May 29, 2010	WISE	WISE	·	5.0 km	MPC · JPL
519062	2010 KE_{108}	—	May 29, 2010	WISE	WISE	·	2.7 km	MPC · JPL
519063	2010 KX_{109}	—	October 18, 2004	Kitt Peak	Spacewatch	·	2.7 km	MPC · JPL
519064	2010 KY_{110}	—	May 29, 2010	WISE	WISE	VER	2.9 km	MPC · JPL
519065	2010 KB_{113}	—	March 13, 2005	Kitt Peak	Spacewatch	·	4.8 km	MPC · JPL
519066	2010 KE_{115}	—	June 4, 2011	Mount Lemmon	Mount Lemmon Survey	·	3.9 km	MPC · JPL
519067	2010 KN_{119}	—	May 30, 2010	WISE	WISE	·	2.9 km	MPC · JPL
519068	2010 KS_{126}	—	May 31, 2010	WISE	WISE	·	4.5 km	MPC · JPL
519069	2010 LN	—	June 1, 2010	Catalina	CSS	·	2.9 km	MPC · JPL
519070	2010 LJ_{2}	—	June 1, 2010	WISE	WISE	·	2.9 km	MPC · JPL
519071	2010 LF_{7}	—	March 20, 2010	Mount Lemmon	Mount Lemmon Survey	·	2.4 km	MPC · JPL
519072	2010 LC_{11}	—	June 2, 2010	WISE	WISE	·	2.8 km	MPC · JPL
519073	2010 LZ_{17}	—	June 3, 2010	WISE	WISE	·	2.9 km	MPC · JPL
519074	2010 LP_{18}	—	June 3, 2010	WISE	WISE	·	3.1 km	MPC · JPL
519075	2010 LQ_{18}	—	June 3, 2010	WISE	WISE	CYB	4.2 km	MPC · JPL
519076	2010 LJ_{23}	—	June 4, 2010	WISE	WISE	·	2.8 km	MPC · JPL
519077	2010 LR_{24}	—	June 4, 2010	WISE	WISE	·	3.5 km	MPC · JPL
519078	2010 LB_{26}	—	June 5, 2010	WISE	WISE	·	2.5 km	MPC · JPL
519079	2010 LS_{32}	—	June 6, 2010	WISE	WISE	·	4.2 km	MPC · JPL
519080	2010 LM_{36}	—	October 28, 2008	Catalina	CSS	T_{j} (2.99)	5.1 km	MPC · JPL
519081	2010 LV_{36}	—	November 20, 2008	Kitt Peak	Spacewatch	·	2.6 km	MPC · JPL
519082	2010 LZ_{46}	—	December 1, 2006	Kitt Peak	Spacewatch	·	3.7 km	MPC · JPL
519083	2010 LH_{49}	—	November 1, 2005	Catalina	CSS	·	3.2 km	MPC · JPL
519084	2010 LU_{51}	—	November 1, 2005	Mount Lemmon	Mount Lemmon Survey	·	2.7 km	MPC · JPL
519085	2010 LT_{54}	—	June 9, 2010	WISE	WISE	·	4.3 km	MPC · JPL
519086	2010 LR_{57}	—	October 29, 2005	Kitt Peak	Spacewatch	·	3.0 km	MPC · JPL
519087	2010 LO_{69}	—	February 16, 2010	Kitt Peak	Spacewatch	·	2.4 km	MPC · JPL
519088	2010 LY_{77}	—	October 7, 2008	Kitt Peak	Spacewatch	·	1.8 km	MPC · JPL
519089	2010 LC_{78}	—	February 16, 2010	Kitt Peak	Spacewatch	VER	2.7 km	MPC · JPL
519090	2010 LC_{83}	—	March 15, 2010	Catalina	CSS	·	3.8 km	MPC · JPL
519091	2010 LO_{83}	—	April 8, 2010	Mount Lemmon	Mount Lemmon Survey	T_{j} (2.99)	4.0 km	MPC · JPL
519092	2010 LA_{87}	—	June 11, 2010	WISE	WISE	·	4.0 km	MPC · JPL
519093	2010 LT_{87}	—	March 20, 2010	Mount Lemmon	Mount Lemmon Survey	EOS	2.1 km	MPC · JPL
519094	2010 LU_{89}	—	October 1, 2005	Catalina	CSS	EMA	5.0 km	MPC · JPL
519095	2010 LV_{89}	—	June 12, 2010	WISE	WISE	·	3.0 km	MPC · JPL
519096	2010 LD_{92}	—	December 5, 2008	Kitt Peak	Spacewatch	·	3.1 km	MPC · JPL
519097	2010 LF_{93}	—	March 20, 2010	Catalina	CSS	·	2.8 km	MPC · JPL
519098	2010 LY_{94}	—	February 2, 2008	Kitt Peak	Spacewatch	TIN	1.8 km	MPC · JPL
519099	2010 LV_{100}	—	March 26, 2014	Mount Lemmon	Mount Lemmon Survey	LUT	4.0 km	MPC · JPL
519100	2010 LH_{101}	—	June 13, 2010	WISE	WISE	·	3.2 km	MPC · JPL

== 519101–519200 ==
back to top

Designation			Discovery			Properties		Ref
Permanent	Provisional	Named after	Date	Site	Discoverer(s)	Category	Diam.	Ref
519101	2010 LY_{102}	—	June 13, 2010	WISE	WISE	·	4.8 km	MPC · JPL
519102	2010 LD_{114}	—	June 14, 2010	WISE	WISE	·	2.5 km	MPC · JPL
519103	2010 LD_{125}	—	February 13, 2007	Mount Lemmon	Mount Lemmon Survey	HYG	3.5 km	MPC · JPL
519104	2010 LE_{128}	—	March 18, 2010	Kitt Peak	Spacewatch	·	3.5 km	MPC · JPL
519105	2010 LX_{129}	—	March 12, 2008	Kitt Peak	Spacewatch	·	4.1 km	MPC · JPL
519106	2010 LS_{135}	—	February 14, 2010	Kitt Peak	Spacewatch	THM	2.2 km	MPC · JPL
519107	2010 MU_{3}	—	June 18, 2010	Mount Lemmon	Mount Lemmon Survey	·	1.9 km	MPC · JPL
519108	2010 MQ_{4}	—	June 22, 2010	Nogales	Tenagra II	·	1.1 km	MPC · JPL
519109	2010 MN_{9}	—	June 16, 2010	WISE	WISE	·	2.9 km	MPC · JPL
519110	2010 MA_{10}	—	June 16, 2010	WISE	WISE	·	2.1 km	MPC · JPL
519111	2010 MQ_{15}	—	June 17, 2010	WISE	WISE	·	2.0 km	MPC · JPL
519112	2010 MZ_{21}	—	February 22, 2004	Kitt Peak	Spacewatch	·	3.4 km	MPC · JPL
519113	2010 MO_{22}	—	February 10, 2008	Kitt Peak	Spacewatch	·	4.0 km	MPC · JPL
519114	2010 MS_{24}	—	June 18, 2010	WISE	WISE	(7605)	4.7 km	MPC · JPL
519115	2010 MA_{25}	—	June 18, 2010	WISE	WISE	·	3.0 km	MPC · JPL
519116	2010 MR_{27}	—	June 19, 2010	WISE	WISE	·	2.1 km	MPC · JPL
519117	2010 MB_{29}	—	June 19, 2010	WISE	WISE	·	2.2 km	MPC · JPL
519118	2010 MR_{30}	—	December 13, 2006	Mount Lemmon	Mount Lemmon Survey	·	4.2 km	MPC · JPL
519119	2010 MF_{34}	—	June 21, 2010	WISE	WISE	·	2.2 km	MPC · JPL
519120	2010 MZ_{34}	—	March 20, 2010	Catalina	CSS	NAE	5.0 km	MPC · JPL
519121	2010 MM_{39}	—	June 22, 2010	WISE	WISE	LIX	3.1 km	MPC · JPL
519122	2010 MP_{41}	—	October 25, 2008	Kitt Peak	Spacewatch	·	2.5 km	MPC · JPL
519123	2010 MS_{42}	—	September 18, 2006	Kitt Peak	Spacewatch	·	2.8 km	MPC · JPL
519124	2010 MP_{45}	—	April 17, 2005	Kitt Peak	Spacewatch	·	2.0 km	MPC · JPL
519125	2010 MD_{46}	—	June 23, 2010	WISE	WISE	·	1.5 km	MPC · JPL
519126	2010 ML_{53}	—	December 21, 2008	Mount Lemmon	Mount Lemmon Survey	·	3.5 km	MPC · JPL
519127	2010 ML_{56}	—	December 1, 2008	Kitt Peak	Spacewatch	·	3.8 km	MPC · JPL
519128	2010 MX_{60}	—	June 1, 2005	Kitt Peak	Spacewatch	URS	3.9 km	MPC · JPL
519129	2010 MT_{63}	—	June 24, 2010	WISE	WISE	·	2.2 km	MPC · JPL
519130	2010 MW_{66}	—	June 25, 2010	WISE	WISE	·	4.0 km	MPC · JPL
519131	2010 MC_{76}	—	June 26, 2010	WISE	WISE	·	2.3 km	MPC · JPL
519132	2010 MB_{80}	—	June 26, 2010	WISE	WISE	·	2.1 km	MPC · JPL
519133	2010 MQ_{82}	—	June 27, 2010	WISE	WISE	·	4.4 km	MPC · JPL
519134	2010 MR_{86}	—	June 27, 2010	WISE	WISE	·	1.8 km	MPC · JPL
519135	2010 MB_{96}	—	June 28, 2010	WISE	WISE	·	3.1 km	MPC · JPL
519136	2010 MU_{97}	—	January 11, 2008	Kitt Peak	Spacewatch	DOR	2.5 km	MPC · JPL
519137	2010 MY_{97}	—	June 28, 2010	WISE	WISE	·	4.0 km	MPC · JPL
519138	2010 MT_{99}	—	March 12, 2005	Kitt Peak	Spacewatch	·	1.9 km	MPC · JPL
519139	2010 MV_{106}	—	April 19, 2009	Kitt Peak	Spacewatch	·	2.1 km	MPC · JPL
519140	2010 MK_{112}	—	June 20, 2010	Mount Lemmon	Mount Lemmon Survey	·	3.1 km	MPC · JPL
519141	2010 MU_{116}	—	November 3, 2007	Kitt Peak	Spacewatch	·	1.5 km	MPC · JPL
519142	2010 NZ_{3}	—	October 19, 2006	Kitt Peak	Spacewatch	·	2.0 km	MPC · JPL
519143	2010 NC_{10}	—	October 3, 2006	Mount Lemmon	Mount Lemmon Survey	·	3.7 km	MPC · JPL
519144	2010 ND_{14}	—	July 5, 2010	WISE	WISE	ELF	4.5 km	MPC · JPL
519145	2010 NG_{16}	—	March 19, 2010	Kitt Peak	Spacewatch	·	3.3 km	MPC · JPL
519146	2010 NL_{16}	—	May 6, 2006	Kitt Peak	Spacewatch	·	1.6 km	MPC · JPL
519147	2010 NQ_{19}	—	July 6, 2010	WISE	WISE	·	1.9 km	MPC · JPL
519148	2010 NN_{23}	—	March 17, 2010	Kitt Peak	Spacewatch	·	1.3 km	MPC · JPL
519149	2010 NL_{42}	—	July 9, 2010	WISE	WISE	·	3.6 km	MPC · JPL
519150	2010 NT_{42}	—	July 9, 2010	WISE	WISE	·	4.5 km	MPC · JPL
519151	2010 NR_{43}	—	July 9, 2010	WISE	WISE	·	2.5 km	MPC · JPL
519152	2010 NC_{46}	—	February 10, 2007	Mount Lemmon	Mount Lemmon Survey	·	2.6 km	MPC · JPL
519153	2010 NG_{47}	—	July 9, 2010	WISE	WISE	URS	4.1 km	MPC · JPL
519154	2010 NO_{50}	—	July 9, 2010	WISE	WISE	ARM	2.9 km	MPC · JPL
519155	2010 NS_{64}	—	December 15, 2007	Kitt Peak	Spacewatch	·	3.4 km	MPC · JPL
519156	2010 NZ_{77}	—	January 15, 2009	Kitt Peak	Spacewatch	·	2.6 km	MPC · JPL
519157	2010 NM_{78}	—	July 15, 2010	WISE	WISE	EUP	2.0 km	MPC · JPL
519158	2010 NW_{80}	—	July 15, 2010	WISE	WISE	·	1.2 km	MPC · JPL
519159	2010 NX_{88}	—	July 2, 2010	WISE	WISE	·	1.4 km	MPC · JPL
519160	2010 NY_{97}	—	December 2, 2005	Kitt Peak	Spacewatch	·	4.6 km	MPC · JPL
519161	2010 NU_{102}	—	July 12, 2010	WISE	WISE	VER	3.3 km	MPC · JPL
519162	2010 NG_{104}	—	July 12, 2010	WISE	WISE	LIX	3.5 km	MPC · JPL
519163	2010 NB_{105}	—	July 12, 2010	WISE	WISE	·	3.2 km	MPC · JPL
519164	2010 NR_{105}	—	January 17, 2013	Haleakala	Pan-STARRS 1	·	2.6 km	MPC · JPL
519165	2010 NN_{110}	—	July 13, 2010	WISE	WISE	·	2.4 km	MPC · JPL
519166	2010 NN_{118}	—	April 29, 2010	WISE	WISE	·	3.4 km	MPC · JPL
519167	2010 OA_{2}	—	July 16, 2010	WISE	WISE	·	2.3 km	MPC · JPL
519168	2010 OT_{6}	—	July 16, 2010	WISE	WISE	·	2.9 km	MPC · JPL
519169	2010 OX_{20}	—	June 17, 2010	Mount Lemmon	Mount Lemmon Survey	·	4.2 km	MPC · JPL
519170	2010 OW_{22}	—	July 18, 2010	WISE	WISE	·	3.2 km	MPC · JPL
519171	2010 OA_{28}	—	February 17, 2007	Kitt Peak	Spacewatch	·	3.0 km	MPC · JPL
519172	2010 OW_{45}	—	November 22, 2005	Kitt Peak	Spacewatch	·	2.4 km	MPC · JPL
519173	2010 OO_{55}	—	July 23, 2010	WISE	WISE	LIX	3.1 km	MPC · JPL
519174	2010 OM_{64}	—	July 24, 2010	WISE	WISE	·	2.9 km	MPC · JPL
519175	2010 OC_{67}	—	May 9, 2006	Mount Lemmon	Mount Lemmon Survey	·	2.0 km	MPC · JPL
519176	2010 OW_{67}	—	April 9, 2010	Kitt Peak	Spacewatch	·	2.9 km	MPC · JPL
519177	2010 OR_{83}	—	September 12, 2004	Kitt Peak	Spacewatch	·	2.3 km	MPC · JPL
519178	2010 OG_{85}	—	August 23, 2004	Kitt Peak	Spacewatch	·	2.8 km	MPC · JPL
519179	2010 OQ_{88}	—	April 30, 2008	Kitt Peak	Spacewatch	·	3.6 km	MPC · JPL
519180	2010 OD_{97}	—	July 28, 2010	WISE	WISE	·	4.4 km	MPC · JPL
519181	2010 OC_{107}	—	July 29, 2010	WISE	WISE	·	3.0 km	MPC · JPL
519182	2010 OV_{109}	—	July 29, 2010	WISE	WISE	·	2.5 km	MPC · JPL
519183	2010 OD_{110}	—	April 16, 2005	Kitt Peak	Spacewatch	·	1.1 km	MPC · JPL
519184	2010 OP_{111}	—	July 29, 2010	WISE	WISE	·	2.1 km	MPC · JPL
519185	2010 OK_{114}	—	February 2, 2001	Kitt Peak	Spacewatch	·	2.9 km	MPC · JPL
519186	2010 OB_{116}	—	May 12, 2010	Mount Lemmon	Mount Lemmon Survey	·	3.4 km	MPC · JPL
519187	2010 OE_{125}	—	February 7, 2008	Kitt Peak	Spacewatch	·	2.1 km	MPC · JPL
519188	2010 PK_{7}	—	August 1, 2010	WISE	WISE	·	4.6 km	MPC · JPL
519189	2010 PY_{7}	—	August 28, 2006	Kitt Peak	Spacewatch	·	3.9 km	MPC · JPL
519190	2010 PX_{18}	—	August 4, 2010	WISE	WISE	·	1.6 km	MPC · JPL
519191	2010 PD_{21}	—	August 4, 2010	WISE	WISE	·	3.9 km	MPC · JPL
519192	2010 PB_{35}	—	August 5, 2010	WISE	WISE	HOF	2.4 km	MPC · JPL
519193	2010 PB_{38}	—	May 14, 2010	Mount Lemmon	Mount Lemmon Survey	·	1.9 km	MPC · JPL
519194	2010 PE_{50}	—	February 11, 2010	WISE	WISE	·	2.6 km	MPC · JPL
519195	2010 PF_{50}	—	January 29, 2010	WISE	WISE	·	1.5 km	MPC · JPL
519196	2010 PR_{68}	—	August 9, 2010	WISE	WISE	·	3.7 km	MPC · JPL
519197	2010 PF_{74}	—	August 10, 2010	XuYi	PMO NEO Survey Program	·	1.4 km	MPC · JPL
519198	2010 PZ_{77}	—	August 13, 2010	WISE	WISE	·	2.3 km	MPC · JPL
519199	2010 PM_{81}	—	September 25, 2006	Kitt Peak	Spacewatch	EMA	3.3 km	MPC · JPL
519200	2010 PR_{81}	—	August 12, 2010	Kitt Peak	Spacewatch	(58892)	2.4 km	MPC · JPL

== 519201–519300 ==
back to top

Designation			Discovery			Properties		Ref
Permanent	Provisional	Named after	Date	Site	Discoverer(s)	Category	Diam.	Ref
519201	2010 PU_{81}	—	August 12, 2010	Kitt Peak	Spacewatch	·	2.3 km	MPC · JPL
519202	2010 RH_{19}	—	August 4, 2010	La Sagra	OAM	JUN	960 m	MPC · JPL
519203	2010 RA_{26}	—	August 12, 2010	Kitt Peak	Spacewatch	EOS	1.7 km	MPC · JPL
519204	2010 RU_{46}	—	September 3, 2010	La Sagra	OAM	MAR	1.3 km	MPC · JPL
519205	2010 RY_{100}	—	September 10, 2010	Kitt Peak	Spacewatch	·	2.2 km	MPC · JPL
519206	2010 RK_{137}	—	September 10, 2010	Mount Lemmon	Mount Lemmon Survey	VER	2.7 km	MPC · JPL
519207	2010 RS_{172}	—	October 13, 2006	Kitt Peak	Spacewatch	·	1.4 km	MPC · JPL
519208	2010 RL_{189}	—	April 6, 2008	Mount Lemmon	Mount Lemmon Survey	·	2.8 km	MPC · JPL
519209	2010 RO_{189}	—	September 17, 2006	Kitt Peak	Spacewatch	MAS	710 m	MPC · JPL
519210	2010 SH_{44}	—	September 16, 2010	Kitt Peak	Spacewatch	·	2.7 km	MPC · JPL
519211	2010 SJ_{44}	—	November 3, 2005	Kitt Peak	Spacewatch	·	2.1 km	MPC · JPL
519212	2010 SR_{44}	—	October 19, 2006	Kitt Peak	Spacewatch	·	1.2 km	MPC · JPL
519213	2010 TY_{61}	—	June 23, 2010	WISE	WISE	JUN	1.1 km	MPC · JPL
519214	2010 TP_{81}	—	September 30, 2010	Mount Lemmon	Mount Lemmon Survey	·	2.8 km	MPC · JPL
519215	2010 TL_{135}	—	October 11, 2010	Mount Lemmon	Mount Lemmon Survey	·	1.6 km	MPC · JPL
519216	2010 TU_{173}	—	April 6, 2008	Kitt Peak	Spacewatch	VER	2.9 km	MPC · JPL
519217	2010 TE_{194}	—	October 1, 2010	Mount Lemmon	Mount Lemmon Survey	·	3.1 km	MPC · JPL
519218	2010 TM_{194}	—	March 29, 2008	Kitt Peak	Spacewatch	·	1.8 km	MPC · JPL
519219	2010 TN_{194}	—	October 12, 2010	Mount Lemmon	Mount Lemmon Survey	·	950 m	MPC · JPL
519220	2010 TP_{194}	—	October 13, 2010	Mount Lemmon	Mount Lemmon Survey	V	410 m	MPC · JPL
519221	2010 UM_{109}	—	October 28, 2010	Mount Lemmon	Mount Lemmon Survey	·	2.3 km	MPC · JPL
519222	2010 UQ_{109}	—	October 28, 2010	Mount Lemmon	Mount Lemmon Survey	·	3.4 km	MPC · JPL
519223	2010 UT_{109}	—	September 23, 2006	Kitt Peak	Spacewatch	V	600 m	MPC · JPL
519224	2010 UW_{109}	—	October 31, 2010	Mount Lemmon	Mount Lemmon Survey	·	4.4 km	MPC · JPL
519225	2010 VT_{26}	—	November 1, 2010	Kitt Peak	Spacewatch	TIR	3.2 km	MPC · JPL
519226	2010 VY_{34}	—	December 21, 2006	Kitt Peak	Spacewatch	·	3.0 km	MPC · JPL
519227	2010 VF_{62}	—	November 5, 2010	Kitt Peak	Spacewatch	·	1.6 km	MPC · JPL
519228	2010 VO_{81}	—	October 11, 2010	Mount Lemmon	Mount Lemmon Survey	·	2.0 km	MPC · JPL
519229	2010 VB_{115}	—	March 5, 2008	Kitt Peak	Spacewatch	·	1.5 km	MPC · JPL
519230	2010 VR_{124}	—	October 29, 2010	Mount Lemmon	Mount Lemmon Survey	·	2.1 km	MPC · JPL
519231	2010 VL_{140}	—	September 5, 2010	Mount Lemmon	Mount Lemmon Survey	·	1.6 km	MPC · JPL
519232	2010 VQ_{182}	—	November 12, 2010	Kitt Peak	Spacewatch	·	2.5 km	MPC · JPL
519233	2010 VD_{190}	—	November 13, 2010	Mount Lemmon	Mount Lemmon Survey	·	850 m	MPC · JPL
519234	2010 VN_{226}	—	November 1, 2010	Kitt Peak	Spacewatch	WIT	940 m	MPC · JPL
519235	2010 VO_{226}	—	November 1, 2010	Mount Lemmon	Mount Lemmon Survey	EUN	1.5 km	MPC · JPL
519236	2010 VS_{226}	—	March 28, 2008	Kitt Peak	Spacewatch	·	1.8 km	MPC · JPL
519237	2010 VE_{227}	—	December 14, 1995	Kitt Peak	Spacewatch	·	1.4 km	MPC · JPL
519238	2010 VG_{227}	—	January 10, 2007	Kitt Peak	Spacewatch	·	2.5 km	MPC · JPL
519239	2010 VJ_{227}	—	November 7, 2010	Mount Lemmon	Mount Lemmon Survey	·	850 m	MPC · JPL
519240	2010 VL_{227}	—	January 25, 2007	Kitt Peak	Spacewatch	DOR	2.2 km	MPC · JPL
519241	2010 VU_{227}	—	November 2, 2010	Kitt Peak	Spacewatch	·	1.4 km	MPC · JPL
519242	2010 VV_{227}	—	November 22, 2006	Kitt Peak	Spacewatch	·	1.1 km	MPC · JPL
519243	2010 WB_{66}	—	March 7, 2008	Mount Lemmon	Mount Lemmon Survey	·	1.8 km	MPC · JPL
519244	2010 XB_{75}	—	December 24, 2006	Kitt Peak	Spacewatch	EUN	890 m	MPC · JPL
519245	2010 XU_{87}	—	November 26, 2010	Mount Lemmon	Mount Lemmon Survey	URS	2.8 km	MPC · JPL
519246	2010 XE_{92}	—	December 14, 2010	Mount Lemmon	Mount Lemmon Survey	EOS	1.6 km	MPC · JPL
519247	2010 XL_{92}	—	November 8, 2010	Kitt Peak	Spacewatch	·	2.1 km	MPC · JPL
519248	2010 XP_{92}	—	April 8, 2008	Kitt Peak	Spacewatch	·	1.1 km	MPC · JPL
519249	2010 XV_{92}	—	November 17, 2001	Kitt Peak	Spacewatch	·	1.2 km	MPC · JPL
519250	2010 XW_{92}	—	December 8, 2010	Kitt Peak	Spacewatch	·	730 m	MPC · JPL
519251	2010 XX_{92}	—	December 8, 2010	Kitt Peak	Spacewatch	·	1.8 km	MPC · JPL
519252	2010 XA_{93}	—	December 10, 2010	Mount Lemmon	Mount Lemmon Survey	TEL	1.3 km	MPC · JPL
519253	2010 XC_{93}	—	December 13, 2010	Mount Lemmon	Mount Lemmon Survey	·	740 m	MPC · JPL
519254	2010 XF_{93}	—	December 14, 2010	Mount Lemmon	Mount Lemmon Survey	KOR	1.1 km	MPC · JPL
519255	2010 XJ_{93}	—	September 9, 2008	Mount Lemmon	Mount Lemmon Survey	·	2.6 km	MPC · JPL
519256	2011 AB_{9}	—	October 9, 2008	Mount Lemmon	Mount Lemmon Survey	·	3.3 km	MPC · JPL
519257	2011 AQ_{15}	—	December 6, 2010	Mount Lemmon	Mount Lemmon Survey	·	2.3 km	MPC · JPL
519258	2011 AL_{48}	—	January 11, 2011	Kitt Peak	Spacewatch	·	2.4 km	MPC · JPL
519259	2011 AU_{58}	—	January 12, 2011	Mount Lemmon	Mount Lemmon Survey	EOS	2.2 km	MPC · JPL
519260	2011 AM_{69}	—	January 13, 2011	Mount Lemmon	Mount Lemmon Survey	·	2.9 km	MPC · JPL
519261	2011 AF_{81}	—	January 14, 2011	Mount Lemmon	Mount Lemmon Survey	·	2.5 km	MPC · JPL
519262	2011 AC_{82}	—	January 3, 2011	Mount Lemmon	Mount Lemmon Survey	·	1.1 km	MPC · JPL
519263	2011 AF_{82}	—	January 4, 2011	Mount Lemmon	Mount Lemmon Survey	·	1.1 km	MPC · JPL
519264	2011 AH_{82}	—	December 7, 2005	Kitt Peak	Spacewatch	·	1.6 km	MPC · JPL
519265	2011 AJ_{82}	—	February 24, 2006	Kitt Peak	Spacewatch	·	2.6 km	MPC · JPL
519266	2011 AK_{82}	—	March 21, 2002	Kitt Peak	Spacewatch	·	1.6 km	MPC · JPL
519267	2011 AM_{82}	—	January 10, 2011	Mount Lemmon	Mount Lemmon Survey	·	1.3 km	MPC · JPL
519268	2011 AP_{82}	—	January 11, 2011	Kitt Peak	Spacewatch	EUN	1.1 km	MPC · JPL
519269	2011 AX_{82}	—	January 13, 2011	Kitt Peak	Spacewatch	·	540 m	MPC · JPL
519270	2011 AY_{82}	—	January 13, 2011	Kitt Peak	Spacewatch	·	880 m	MPC · JPL
519271	2011 AZ_{82}	—	December 13, 2006	Kitt Peak	Spacewatch	MAS	540 m	MPC · JPL
519272	2011 AF_{83}	—	January 14, 2011	Kitt Peak	Spacewatch	·	810 m	MPC · JPL
519273	2011 BJ_{37}	—	January 28, 2011	Mount Lemmon	Mount Lemmon Survey	·	1.6 km	MPC · JPL
519274	2011 BR_{42}	—	April 14, 2007	Kitt Peak	Spacewatch	·	2.3 km	MPC · JPL
519275	2011 BU_{58}	—	November 10, 2009	Mount Lemmon	Mount Lemmon Survey	·	1.2 km	MPC · JPL
519276	2011 BA_{166}	—	January 24, 2011	Mount Lemmon	Mount Lemmon Survey	·	840 m	MPC · JPL
519277	2011 BB_{166}	—	January 23, 2006	Kitt Peak	Spacewatch	·	2.2 km	MPC · JPL
519278	2011 BC_{166}	—	November 12, 2005	Kitt Peak	Spacewatch	·	1.5 km	MPC · JPL
519279	2011 BE_{166}	—	January 26, 2011	Mount Lemmon	Mount Lemmon Survey	·	910 m	MPC · JPL
519280	2011 BH_{166}	—	January 27, 2011	Mount Lemmon	Mount Lemmon Survey	·	1.1 km	MPC · JPL
519281	2011 BL_{166}	—	January 27, 2011	Mount Lemmon	Mount Lemmon Survey	·	1.5 km	MPC · JPL
519282	2011 BS_{166}	—	January 29, 2011	Kitt Peak	Spacewatch	EUN	1.2 km	MPC · JPL
519283	2011 BT_{166}	—	June 7, 2003	Kitt Peak	Spacewatch	·	1.5 km	MPC · JPL
519284	2011 BW_{166}	—	February 9, 2011	Mount Lemmon	Mount Lemmon Survey	EUN	880 m	MPC · JPL
519285	2011 BZ_{166}	—	January 28, 2011	Mount Lemmon	Mount Lemmon Survey	·	1.1 km	MPC · JPL
519286	2011 BF_{167}	—	October 27, 2009	Kitt Peak	Spacewatch	·	1.4 km	MPC · JPL
519287	2011 BL_{167}	—	March 14, 2011	Mount Lemmon	Mount Lemmon Survey	·	1.1 km	MPC · JPL
519288	2011 BP_{167}	—	March 15, 2007	Kitt Peak	Spacewatch	·	1.5 km	MPC · JPL
519289	2011 BN_{168}	—	March 14, 2011	Mount Lemmon	Mount Lemmon Survey	·	1.0 km	MPC · JPL
519290	2011 BS_{168}	—	December 10, 2005	Kitt Peak	Spacewatch	·	1.8 km	MPC · JPL
519291	2011 BT_{168}	—	February 7, 2011	Mount Lemmon	Mount Lemmon Survey	·	1.1 km	MPC · JPL
519292	2011 BF_{169}	—	February 11, 2011	Mount Lemmon	Mount Lemmon Survey	·	1.1 km	MPC · JPL
519293	2011 CG_{38}	—	September 21, 2009	Kitt Peak	Spacewatch	V	560 m	MPC · JPL
519294	2011 CO_{92}	—	February 5, 2011	Haleakala	Pan-STARRS 1	·	1.6 km	MPC · JPL
519295	2011 CU_{120}	—	February 26, 2011	Mount Lemmon	Mount Lemmon Survey	V	700 m	MPC · JPL
519296	2011 CX_{120}	—	February 10, 2011	Mount Lemmon	Mount Lemmon Survey	·	1.8 km	MPC · JPL
519297	2011 CY_{120}	—	February 10, 2011	Mount Lemmon	Mount Lemmon Survey	·	2.1 km	MPC · JPL
519298	2011 CD_{121}	—	September 5, 2007	Mount Lemmon	Mount Lemmon Survey	·	2.7 km	MPC · JPL
519299	2011 CE_{121}	—	September 17, 2009	Kitt Peak	Spacewatch	·	960 m	MPC · JPL
519300	2011 CM_{121}	—	February 13, 2011	Mount Lemmon	Mount Lemmon Survey	·	1.9 km	MPC · JPL

== 519301–519400 ==
back to top

Designation			Discovery			Properties		Ref
Permanent	Provisional	Named after	Date	Site	Discoverer(s)	Category	Diam.	Ref
519301	2011 DU_{7}	—	November 20, 2006	Kitt Peak	Spacewatch	·	720 m	MPC · JPL
519302	2011 DR_{12}	—	February 23, 2011	Kitt Peak	Spacewatch	·	610 m	MPC · JPL
519303	2011 DL_{45}	—	February 26, 2011	Mount Lemmon	Mount Lemmon Survey	·	1.3 km	MPC · JPL
519304	2011 DG_{53}	—	February 25, 2011	Kitt Peak	Spacewatch	·	800 m	MPC · JPL
519305	2011 DH_{53}	—	February 25, 2011	Kitt Peak	Spacewatch	·	1.9 km	MPC · JPL
519306	2011 DN_{53}	—	March 26, 2007	Mount Lemmon	Mount Lemmon Survey	·	940 m	MPC · JPL
519307	2011 EF_{15}	—	February 25, 2011	Mount Lemmon	Mount Lemmon Survey	AMO	310 m	MPC · JPL
519308	2011 EJ_{62}	—	December 28, 2005	Kitt Peak	Spacewatch	·	1.5 km	MPC · JPL
519309	2011 EP_{72}	—	March 11, 2011	Kitt Peak	Spacewatch	·	650 m	MPC · JPL
519310	2011 EE_{89}	—	March 2, 2011	Kitt Peak	Spacewatch	·	1.7 km	MPC · JPL
519311	2011 EG_{89}	—	March 2, 2011	Kitt Peak	Spacewatch	AGN	950 m	MPC · JPL
519312	2011 EH_{89}	—	October 8, 2008	Kitt Peak	Spacewatch	·	2.3 km	MPC · JPL
519313	2011 EK_{89}	—	March 2, 2011	Mount Lemmon	Mount Lemmon Survey	·	1.7 km	MPC · JPL
519314	2011 EL_{89}	—	February 23, 2011	Kitt Peak	Spacewatch	·	1.2 km	MPC · JPL
519315	2011 EN_{89}	—	August 7, 2008	Kitt Peak	Spacewatch	·	1.2 km	MPC · JPL
519316	2011 ER_{89}	—	March 6, 2011	Mount Lemmon	Mount Lemmon Survey	·	2.9 km	MPC · JPL
519317	2011 ES_{89}	—	March 6, 2011	Mount Lemmon	Mount Lemmon Survey	·	1.4 km	MPC · JPL
519318	2011 EV_{89}	—	March 13, 2007	Kitt Peak	Spacewatch	·	900 m	MPC · JPL
519319	2011 EY_{89}	—	October 9, 2005	Kitt Peak	Spacewatch	·	1.1 km	MPC · JPL
519320	2011 EC_{90}	—	March 11, 2011	Kitt Peak	Spacewatch	·	1.0 km	MPC · JPL
519321	2011 ED_{90}	—	September 17, 2009	Kitt Peak	Spacewatch	·	1.1 km	MPC · JPL
519322	2011 EE_{90}	—	November 18, 2009	Kitt Peak	Spacewatch	·	760 m	MPC · JPL
519323	2011 EF_{90}	—	September 21, 2008	Mount Lemmon	Mount Lemmon Survey	·	1.9 km	MPC · JPL
519324	2011 FA_{16}	—	November 24, 2008	Kitt Peak	Spacewatch	HYG	2.8 km	MPC · JPL
519325	2011 FT_{20}	—	March 29, 2011	Mount Lemmon	Mount Lemmon Survey	·	1.2 km	MPC · JPL
519326	2011 FB_{52}	—	September 12, 2005	Kitt Peak	Spacewatch	·	1.2 km	MPC · JPL
519327	2011 FV_{62}	—	March 30, 2011	Mount Lemmon	Mount Lemmon Survey	·	1.3 km	MPC · JPL
519328	2011 FS_{63}	—	March 10, 2011	Kitt Peak	Spacewatch	·	1.1 km	MPC · JPL
519329	2011 FA_{99}	—	September 12, 2007	Mount Lemmon	Mount Lemmon Survey	·	1.5 km	MPC · JPL
519330	2011 FS_{107}	—	April 1, 2011	Mount Lemmon	Mount Lemmon Survey	·	1.4 km	MPC · JPL
519331	2011 FY_{138}	—	October 8, 2008	Kitt Peak	Spacewatch	·	2.4 km	MPC · JPL
519332	2011 FE_{159}	—	March 25, 2011	Kitt Peak	Spacewatch	EUN	1.2 km	MPC · JPL
519333	2011 FF_{159}	—	March 10, 2002	Kitt Peak	Spacewatch	·	1.2 km	MPC · JPL
519334	2011 FG_{159}	—	September 24, 2008	Kitt Peak	Spacewatch	NEM	2.3 km	MPC · JPL
519335	2011 FH_{159}	—	October 8, 2004	Kitt Peak	Spacewatch	·	2.0 km	MPC · JPL
519336	2011 FJ_{159}	—	March 30, 2011	Mount Lemmon	Mount Lemmon Survey	MAR	830 m	MPC · JPL
519337	2011 FK_{159}	—	March 30, 2011	Mount Lemmon	Mount Lemmon Survey	MRX	940 m	MPC · JPL
519338	2011 GW_{2}	—	March 14, 2011	Catalina	CSS	EUN	1.3 km	MPC · JPL
519339	2011 GN_{46}	—	March 28, 2011	Kitt Peak	Spacewatch	PHO	660 m	MPC · JPL
519340	2011 GW_{89}	—	April 1, 2011	Kitt Peak	Spacewatch	NEM	2.3 km	MPC · JPL
519341	2011 GX_{89}	—	April 1, 2011	Mount Lemmon	Mount Lemmon Survey	·	1.4 km	MPC · JPL
519342	2011 GA_{90}	—	April 2, 2011	Kitt Peak	Spacewatch	·	1.2 km	MPC · JPL
519343	2011 GH_{90}	—	April 6, 2011	Mount Lemmon	Mount Lemmon Survey	·	3.4 km	MPC · JPL
519344	2011 GL_{90}	—	April 13, 2011	Kitt Peak	Spacewatch	·	2.1 km	MPC · JPL
519345	2011 HN_{9}	—	June 23, 2000	Kitt Peak	Spacewatch	·	2.7 km	MPC · JPL
519346	2011 HQ_{12}	—	April 23, 2011	Kitt Peak	Spacewatch	·	1.1 km	MPC · JPL
519347	2011 HQ_{32}	—	April 6, 2011	Mount Lemmon	Mount Lemmon Survey	BAP	880 m	MPC · JPL
519348	2011 HV_{43}	—	March 31, 2004	Kitt Peak	Spacewatch	·	550 m	MPC · JPL
519349	2011 HC_{71}	—	March 15, 2004	Kitt Peak	Spacewatch	·	500 m	MPC · JPL
519350	2011 HZ_{103}	—	April 23, 2011	Haleakala	Pan-STARRS 1	·	1.8 km	MPC · JPL
519351	2011 JN_{32}	—	May 1, 2011	Mount Lemmon	Mount Lemmon Survey	·	820 m	MPC · JPL
519352	2011 JS_{32}	—	May 7, 2011	Mount Lemmon	Mount Lemmon Survey	·	1.4 km	MPC · JPL
519353	2011 KG_{7}	—	May 24, 2011	Mount Lemmon	Mount Lemmon Survey	·	2.1 km	MPC · JPL
519354	2011 KR_{12}	—	May 25, 2011	Siding Spring	SSS	APO	180 m	MPC · JPL
519355	2011 KB_{34}	—	May 3, 2011	Mount Lemmon	Mount Lemmon Survey	·	1.4 km	MPC · JPL
519356	2011 KH_{49}	—	August 10, 2007	Kitt Peak	Spacewatch	·	1.9 km	MPC · JPL
519357	2011 KJ_{49}	—	October 21, 2008	Kitt Peak	Spacewatch	EOS	1.5 km	MPC · JPL
519358	2011 KK_{49}	—	May 23, 2011	Mount Lemmon	Mount Lemmon Survey	·	2.1 km	MPC · JPL
519359	2011 KM_{49}	—	May 24, 2011	Mount Lemmon	Mount Lemmon Survey	·	2.2 km	MPC · JPL
519360	2011 KO_{49}	—	May 27, 2011	Kitt Peak	Spacewatch	HNS	1.1 km	MPC · JPL
519361	2011 KP_{49}	—	May 29, 2011	Kitt Peak	Spacewatch	EOS	1.8 km	MPC · JPL
519362	2011 LD_{29}	—	June 2, 2011	Haleakala	Pan-STARRS 1	·	1.2 km	MPC · JPL
519363	2011 LF_{29}	—	June 8, 2011	Haleakala	Pan-STARRS 1	·	3.8 km	MPC · JPL
519364	2011 MN_{11}	—	June 27, 2011	Mount Lemmon	Mount Lemmon Survey	·	1.5 km	MPC · JPL
519365	2011 NK_{4}	—	July 2, 2011	Kitt Peak	Spacewatch	·	2.8 km	MPC · JPL
519366	2011 NL_{4}	—	July 9, 2011	Haleakala	Pan-STARRS 1	·	3.8 km	MPC · JPL
519367	2011 OK_{23}	—	June 9, 2011	Mount Lemmon	Mount Lemmon Survey	·	1.2 km	MPC · JPL
519368	2011 OF_{25}	—	September 10, 2007	Catalina	CSS	·	1.8 km	MPC · JPL
519369	2011 OD_{31}	—	April 15, 2010	Kitt Peak	Spacewatch	·	2.6 km	MPC · JPL
519370	2011 OO_{54}	—	May 24, 2006	Kitt Peak	Spacewatch	·	1.5 km	MPC · JPL
519371	2011 OT_{60}	—	July 27, 2011	Haleakala	Pan-STARRS 1	EOS	1.8 km	MPC · JPL
519372	2011 OU_{60}	—	July 28, 2011	Haleakala	Pan-STARRS 1	EOS	1.3 km	MPC · JPL
519373	2011 OV_{60}	—	January 15, 2008	Kitt Peak	Spacewatch	·	2.7 km	MPC · JPL
519374	2011 PF_{16}	—	August 10, 2011	Haleakala	Pan-STARRS 1	·	2.5 km	MPC · JPL
519375	2011 PG_{16}	—	October 10, 2007	Kitt Peak	Spacewatch	·	1.8 km	MPC · JPL
519376	2011 QH_{12}	—	August 20, 2011	Haleakala	Pan-STARRS 1	·	1.2 km	MPC · JPL
519377	2011 QT_{19}	—	July 27, 2011	Haleakala	Pan-STARRS 1	NYS	1.0 km	MPC · JPL
519378	2011 QZ_{68}	—	August 23, 2011	Haleakala	Pan-STARRS 1	·	1.0 km	MPC · JPL
519379	2011 QH_{69}	—	December 3, 2004	Kitt Peak	Spacewatch	PHO	1.1 km	MPC · JPL
519380	2011 QH_{100}	—	March 20, 2010	Kitt Peak	Spacewatch	·	820 m	MPC · JPL
519381	2011 QK_{100}	—	January 25, 2009	Kitt Peak	Spacewatch	·	1.8 km	MPC · JPL
519382	2011 QL_{100}	—	August 28, 2011	Siding Spring	SSS	·	2.0 km	MPC · JPL
519383	2011 RN_{10}	—	May 7, 2010	Mount Lemmon	Mount Lemmon Survey	·	2.8 km	MPC · JPL
519384	2011 RG_{20}	—	September 18, 2007	Kitt Peak	Spacewatch	·	1.2 km	MPC · JPL
519385	2011 RZ_{20}	—	September 2, 2011	Haleakala	Pan-STARRS 1	·	2.6 km	MPC · JPL
519386	2011 RB_{21}	—	January 29, 2009	Mount Lemmon	Mount Lemmon Survey	·	2.5 km	MPC · JPL
519387	2011 RC_{21}	—	September 4, 2011	Haleakala	Pan-STARRS 1	·	2.3 km	MPC · JPL
519388	2011 SK_{5}	—	August 23, 2011	Haleakala	Pan-STARRS 1	H	370 m	MPC · JPL
519389	2011 SJ_{12}	—	September 18, 2011	Haleakala	Pan-STARRS 1	H	500 m	MPC · JPL
519390	2011 SN_{17}	—	June 17, 2005	Mount Lemmon	Mount Lemmon Survey	·	1.8 km	MPC · JPL
519391	2011 SA_{19}	—	September 19, 2011	Mount Lemmon	Mount Lemmon Survey	TEL	1.1 km	MPC · JPL
519392	2011 SE_{30}	—	March 23, 2009	Kitt Peak	Spacewatch	·	2.1 km	MPC · JPL
519393	2011 SK_{30}	—	June 9, 2011	Haleakala	Pan-STARRS 1	·	1.2 km	MPC · JPL
519394	2011 SR_{49}	—	September 20, 2011	Mount Lemmon	Mount Lemmon Survey	NYS	890 m	MPC · JPL
519395	2011 SY_{71}	—	June 9, 2011	Haleakala	Pan-STARRS 1	·	1.3 km	MPC · JPL
519396	2011 SA_{112}	—	September 19, 2011	Catalina	CSS	·	2.5 km	MPC · JPL
519397	2011 SM_{278}	—	November 2, 2007	Mount Lemmon	Mount Lemmon Survey	·	1.4 km	MPC · JPL
519398	2011 SB_{279}	—	November 10, 2006	Kitt Peak	Spacewatch	·	2.8 km	MPC · JPL
519399	2011 SE_{279}	—	February 2, 2009	Kitt Peak	Spacewatch	·	1.7 km	MPC · JPL
519400	2011 SG_{279}	—	September 21, 2011	Kitt Peak	Spacewatch	·	3.9 km	MPC · JPL

== 519401–519500 ==
back to top

Designation			Discovery			Properties		Ref
Permanent	Provisional	Named after	Date	Site	Discoverer(s)	Category	Diam.	Ref
519401	2011 SK_{279}	—	September 23, 2011	Haleakala	Pan-STARRS 1	·	1.3 km	MPC · JPL
519402	2011 SL_{279}	—	March 17, 2009	Kitt Peak	Spacewatch	·	1.4 km	MPC · JPL
519403	2011 SR_{279}	—	September 24, 2011	Haleakala	Pan-STARRS 1	EOS	1.7 km	MPC · JPL
519404	2011 SV_{279}	—	September 24, 2011	Haleakala	Pan-STARRS 1	·	1.8 km	MPC · JPL
519405	2011 SY_{279}	—	September 24, 2011	Haleakala	Pan-STARRS 1	·	2.0 km	MPC · JPL
519406	2011 SA_{280}	—	September 24, 2011	Haleakala	Pan-STARRS 1	·	1.5 km	MPC · JPL
519407	2011 SD_{280}	—	September 25, 2011	Haleakala	Pan-STARRS 1	526	2.4 km	MPC · JPL
519408	2011 SF_{280}	—	September 25, 2011	Haleakala	Pan-STARRS 1	·	1.9 km	MPC · JPL
519409	2011 SK_{280}	—	September 27, 2011	Mount Lemmon	Mount Lemmon Survey	EOS	2.1 km	MPC · JPL
519410	2011 SP_{280}	—	September 29, 2005	Kitt Peak	Spacewatch	·	2.9 km	MPC · JPL
519411	2011 TJ_{6}	—	September 24, 2011	Haleakala	Pan-STARRS 1	·	1.1 km	MPC · JPL
519412	2011 US_{54}	—	October 18, 2011	Kitt Peak	Spacewatch	H	430 m	MPC · JPL
519413	2011 UB_{62}	—	October 21, 2011	Mount Lemmon	Mount Lemmon Survey	526	2.1 km	MPC · JPL
519414	2011 US_{90}	—	June 4, 2005	Kitt Peak	Spacewatch	H	450 m	MPC · JPL
519415	2011 UC_{113}	—	October 19, 2011	Mount Lemmon	Mount Lemmon Survey	·	1.7 km	MPC · JPL
519416	2011 UZ_{156}	—	October 19, 2011	Mount Lemmon	Mount Lemmon Survey	·	2.0 km	MPC · JPL
519417	2011 UA_{158}	—	October 21, 2011	Mount Lemmon	Mount Lemmon Survey	·	1.7 km	MPC · JPL
519418	2011 UW_{189}	—	October 28, 2011	Socorro	LINEAR	H	630 m	MPC · JPL
519419 Guyewang	2011 UU_{270}	Guyewang	October 25, 2011	XuYi	PMO NEO Survey Program	·	1.8 km	MPC · JPL
519420	2011 UU_{284}	—	October 17, 2011	Kitt Peak	Spacewatch	·	2.3 km	MPC · JPL
519421	2011 UQ_{339}	—	September 23, 2011	Kitt Peak	Spacewatch	·	2.3 km	MPC · JPL
519422	2011 UN_{382}	—	October 24, 2011	Kitt Peak	Spacewatch	H	420 m	MPC · JPL
519423	2011 UV_{382}	—	January 14, 2002	Kitt Peak	Spacewatch	·	2.1 km	MPC · JPL
519424	2011 UX_{413}	—	October 18, 2011	Haleakala	Pan-STARRS 1	·	1.8 km	MPC · JPL
519425	2011 UN_{414}	—	April 15, 2005	Catalina	CSS	·	2.9 km	MPC · JPL
519426	2011 UR_{415}	—	October 18, 2011	Mount Lemmon	Mount Lemmon Survey	(5)	840 m	MPC · JPL
519427	2011 UT_{415}	—	October 19, 2011	Kitt Peak	Spacewatch	·	2.5 km	MPC · JPL
519428	2011 UU_{415}	—	October 20, 2006	Kitt Peak	Spacewatch	EOS	1.4 km	MPC · JPL
519429	2011 UZ_{415}	—	December 3, 2007	Kitt Peak	Spacewatch	·	1.6 km	MPC · JPL
519430	2011 UB_{416}	—	October 22, 2011	Kitt Peak	Spacewatch	·	2.8 km	MPC · JPL
519431	2011 UC_{416}	—	October 23, 2011	Kitt Peak	Spacewatch	ELF	2.6 km	MPC · JPL
519432	2011 UL_{416}	—	October 24, 2011	Haleakala	Pan-STARRS 1	·	1.1 km	MPC · JPL
519433	2011 UN_{416}	—	October 24, 2011	Haleakala	Pan-STARRS 1	·	1.4 km	MPC · JPL
519434	2011 UD_{417}	—	September 6, 2010	Mount Lemmon	Mount Lemmon Survey	·	3.1 km	MPC · JPL
519435	2011 UL_{417}	—	October 26, 2011	Haleakala	Pan-STARRS 1	·	1.7 km	MPC · JPL
519436	2011 UU_{417}	—	October 27, 2011	Mount Lemmon	Mount Lemmon Survey	·	2.4 km	MPC · JPL
519437	2011 VW_{19}	—	November 3, 2006	Mount Lemmon	Mount Lemmon Survey	·	3.1 km	MPC · JPL
519438	2011 VO_{24}	—	November 1, 2011	Kitt Peak	Spacewatch	VER	2.5 km	MPC · JPL
519439	2011 WR_{15}	—	October 24, 2011	Haleakala	Pan-STARRS 1	H	530 m	MPC · JPL
519440	2011 WX_{48}	—	October 23, 2011	Haleakala	Pan-STARRS 1	EUN	1.1 km	MPC · JPL
519441	2011 WO_{63}	—	November 16, 2011	Mount Lemmon	Mount Lemmon Survey	·	1.9 km	MPC · JPL
519442	2011 WT_{78}	—	November 24, 2011	Haleakala	Pan-STARRS 1	·	1.4 km	MPC · JPL
519443	2011 WN_{158}	—	September 25, 2005	Catalina	CSS	EOS	2.6 km	MPC · JPL
519444	2011 XR_{3}	—	December 31, 2007	Mount Lemmon	Mount Lemmon Survey	·	2.0 km	MPC · JPL
519445	2011 YB_{9}	—	November 24, 2011	Mount Lemmon	Mount Lemmon Survey	·	2.3 km	MPC · JPL
519446	2011 YL_{9}	—	November 30, 2011	Mount Lemmon	Mount Lemmon Survey	H	410 m	MPC · JPL
519447	2011 YN_{58}	—	December 29, 2011	Kitt Peak	Spacewatch	·	1.6 km	MPC · JPL
519448	2011 YG_{66}	—	December 31, 2011	Kitt Peak	Spacewatch	·	2.0 km	MPC · JPL
519449	2011 YW_{79}	—	December 24, 2011	Mount Lemmon	Mount Lemmon Survey	·	1.7 km	MPC · JPL
519450	2011 YX_{79}	—	January 5, 2006	Catalina	CSS	LIX	3.4 km	MPC · JPL
519451	2011 YE_{80}	—	December 28, 2011	Kitt Peak	Spacewatch	CYB	2.9 km	MPC · JPL
519452	2011 YG_{80}	—	November 5, 2007	Kitt Peak	Spacewatch	·	1.2 km	MPC · JPL
519453	2011 YN_{80}	—	December 6, 2005	Kitt Peak	Spacewatch	·	2.5 km	MPC · JPL
519454	2011 YP_{80}	—	September 19, 2007	Kitt Peak	Spacewatch	·	640 m	MPC · JPL
519455	2011 YS_{80}	—	April 14, 2004	Kitt Peak	Spacewatch	EUN	1.3 km	MPC · JPL
519456	2012 AE_{25}	—	July 27, 2009	Kitt Peak	Spacewatch	EUN	1.3 km	MPC · JPL
519457	2012 AK_{25}	—	December 27, 2011	Mount Lemmon	Mount Lemmon Survey	·	2.3 km	MPC · JPL
519458	2012 AN_{25}	—	January 5, 2012	Kitt Peak	Spacewatch	·	1.1 km	MPC · JPL
519459	2012 AO_{25}	—	November 11, 2010	Kitt Peak	Spacewatch	·	1.8 km	MPC · JPL
519460	2012 AP_{25}	—	August 17, 2009	Kitt Peak	Spacewatch	EUN	990 m	MPC · JPL
519461	2012 AQ_{25}	—	January 14, 2012	Kitt Peak	Spacewatch	·	1.7 km	MPC · JPL
519462	2012 BX_{42}	—	November 11, 2006	Kitt Peak	Spacewatch	·	1.9 km	MPC · JPL
519463	2012 BS_{152}	—	December 28, 2011	Mount Lemmon	Mount Lemmon Survey	·	2.4 km	MPC · JPL
519464	2012 BO_{157}	—	August 18, 2009	Kitt Peak	Spacewatch	·	2.9 km	MPC · JPL
519465	2012 BP_{157}	—	January 19, 2012	Mount Lemmon	Mount Lemmon Survey	·	3.0 km	MPC · JPL
519466	2012 BR_{157}	—	January 19, 2012	Haleakala	Pan-STARRS 1	·	2.3 km	MPC · JPL
519467	2012 BW_{157}	—	January 19, 2012	Haleakala	Pan-STARRS 1	URS	2.9 km	MPC · JPL
519468	2012 BZ_{157}	—	December 24, 2006	Mount Lemmon	Mount Lemmon Survey	·	2.0 km	MPC · JPL
519469	2012 BA_{158}	—	January 19, 2012	Haleakala	Pan-STARRS 1	·	2.0 km	MPC · JPL
519470	2012 BC_{158}	—	January 19, 2012	Haleakala	Pan-STARRS 1	PHO	760 m	MPC · JPL
519471	2012 BJ_{158}	—	January 19, 2012	Haleakala	Pan-STARRS 1	·	1.1 km	MPC · JPL
519472	2012 BL_{158}	—	January 20, 2012	Haleakala	Pan-STARRS 1	·	2.4 km	MPC · JPL
519473	2012 BU_{158}	—	January 26, 2012	Kitt Peak	Spacewatch	·	3.0 km	MPC · JPL
519474	2012 BH_{159}	—	January 29, 2012	Kitt Peak	Spacewatch	·	1.4 km	MPC · JPL
519475	2012 CD_{17}	—	February 4, 2012	Haleakala	Pan-STARRS 1	H	600 m	MPC · JPL
519476	2012 CP_{58}	—	February 11, 2012	Mount Lemmon	Mount Lemmon Survey	·	1.8 km	MPC · JPL
519477	2012 CS_{58}	—	February 1, 2012	Kitt Peak	Spacewatch	·	1.4 km	MPC · JPL
519478	2012 CW_{58}	—	February 25, 2007	Kitt Peak	Spacewatch	·	1.4 km	MPC · JPL
519479	2012 CD_{59}	—	February 25, 2007	Kitt Peak	Spacewatch	EOS	1.3 km	MPC · JPL
519480	2012 DX_{63}	—	December 25, 2005	Kitt Peak	Spacewatch	VER	2.4 km	MPC · JPL
519481	2012 DV_{65}	—	February 24, 2012	Mount Lemmon	Mount Lemmon Survey	·	850 m	MPC · JPL
519482	2012 DD_{78}	—	November 26, 2010	Mount Lemmon	Mount Lemmon Survey	·	3.2 km	MPC · JPL
519483	2012 DZ_{94}	—	September 14, 2005	Kitt Peak	Spacewatch	·	1.4 km	MPC · JPL
519484	2012 DX_{101}	—	February 16, 2012	Haleakala	Pan-STARRS 1	·	2.6 km	MPC · JPL
519485	2012 DD_{102}	—	July 16, 2005	Siding Spring	SSS	·	2.0 km	MPC · JPL
519486	2012 DF_{102}	—	February 20, 2012	Haleakala	Pan-STARRS 1	EOS	1.8 km	MPC · JPL
519487	2012 DO_{102}	—	February 23, 2012	Kitt Peak	Spacewatch	·	2.2 km	MPC · JPL
519488	2012 DU_{102}	—	February 24, 2012	Kitt Peak	Spacewatch	TIR	2.8 km	MPC · JPL
519489	2012 DV_{102}	—	November 3, 2010	Mount Lemmon	Mount Lemmon Survey	·	690 m	MPC · JPL
519490	2012 DK_{103}	—	October 7, 2005	Mount Lemmon	Mount Lemmon Survey	HNS	860 m	MPC · JPL
519491	2012 DO_{103}	—	February 26, 2012	Haleakala	Pan-STARRS 1	·	1.3 km	MPC · JPL
519492	2012 DQ_{103}	—	September 18, 2006	Kitt Peak	Spacewatch	V	570 m	MPC · JPL
519493	2012 DW_{103}	—	October 20, 2006	Mount Lemmon	Mount Lemmon Survey	·	940 m	MPC · JPL
519494	2012 DO_{104}	—	September 27, 2009	Kitt Peak	Spacewatch	·	1.7 km	MPC · JPL
519495	2012 DR_{104}	—	February 27, 2012	Haleakala	Pan-STARRS 1	·	2.4 km	MPC · JPL
519496	2012 DT_{104}	—	February 27, 2012	Haleakala	Pan-STARRS 1	·	840 m	MPC · JPL
519497	2012 DW_{104}	—	February 7, 2008	Mount Lemmon	Mount Lemmon Survey	·	940 m	MPC · JPL
519498	2012 DA_{105}	—	September 18, 2003	Kitt Peak	Spacewatch	·	2.9 km	MPC · JPL
519499	2012 DG_{105}	—	September 17, 2009	Kitt Peak	Spacewatch	KOR	1.2 km	MPC · JPL
519500	2012 DH_{105}	—	February 28, 2012	Haleakala	Pan-STARRS 1	·	1.3 km	MPC · JPL

== 519501–519600 ==
back to top

Designation			Discovery			Properties		Ref
Permanent	Provisional	Named after	Date	Site	Discoverer(s)	Category	Diam.	Ref
519501	2012 DL_{105}	—	February 9, 2008	Kitt Peak	Spacewatch	·	910 m	MPC · JPL
519502	2012 DO_{105}	—	February 28, 2012	Haleakala	Pan-STARRS 1	·	1.4 km	MPC · JPL
519503	2012 DS_{105}	—	February 26, 2008	Mount Lemmon	Mount Lemmon Survey	·	1.0 km	MPC · JPL
519504	2012 EU_{14}	—	March 15, 2012	Mount Lemmon	Mount Lemmon Survey	AMO	310 m	MPC · JPL
519505	2012 EK_{19}	—	August 27, 2009	Kitt Peak	Spacewatch	·	2.1 km	MPC · JPL
519506	2012 EL_{19}	—	March 1, 2012	Mount Lemmon	Mount Lemmon Survey	·	1.8 km	MPC · JPL
519507	2012 EX_{19}	—	November 11, 2010	Mount Lemmon	Mount Lemmon Survey	·	1.3 km	MPC · JPL
519508	2012 EZ_{19}	—	March 15, 2012	Haleakala	Pan-STARRS 1	·	2.7 km	MPC · JPL
519509	2012 FS_{26}	—	June 8, 2007	Kitt Peak	Spacewatch	·	2.3 km	MPC · JPL
519510	2012 FO_{60}	—	February 12, 2011	Catalina	CSS	·	3.8 km	MPC · JPL
519511	2012 FO_{85}	—	October 27, 2005	Kitt Peak	Spacewatch	·	1.9 km	MPC · JPL
519512	2012 FR_{85}	—	May 3, 2008	Mount Lemmon	Mount Lemmon Survey	(5)	1.0 km	MPC · JPL
519513	2012 FS_{85}	—	March 16, 2012	Mount Lemmon	Mount Lemmon Survey	·	2.8 km	MPC · JPL
519514	2012 FD_{86}	—	March 25, 2012	Kitt Peak	Spacewatch	·	1.9 km	MPC · JPL
519515	2012 FF_{86}	—	March 27, 2012	Kitt Peak	Spacewatch	·	1.7 km	MPC · JPL
519516	2012 FG_{86}	—	March 14, 2012	Mount Lemmon	Mount Lemmon Survey	V	620 m	MPC · JPL
519517	2012 FK_{86}	—	February 25, 2006	Kitt Peak	Spacewatch	HYG	2.5 km	MPC · JPL
519518	2012 FO_{86}	—	April 26, 2007	Kitt Peak	Spacewatch	·	1.5 km	MPC · JPL
519519	2012 GR_{10}	—	March 15, 2012	Kitt Peak	Spacewatch	·	2.4 km	MPC · JPL
519520	2012 GH_{30}	—	March 28, 2012	Haleakala	Pan-STARRS 1	·	3.1 km	MPC · JPL
519521	2012 GE_{40}	—	March 26, 2012	Mount Lemmon	Mount Lemmon Survey	·	3.2 km	MPC · JPL
519522	2012 GP_{41}	—	April 15, 2012	Haleakala	Pan-STARRS 1	TIR	2.8 km	MPC · JPL
519523	2012 HB_{36}	—	April 27, 2012	Haleakala	Pan-STARRS 1	TIR	2.8 km	MPC · JPL
519524	2012 HT_{85}	—	May 14, 2008	Mount Lemmon	Mount Lemmon Survey	·	910 m	MPC · JPL
519525	2012 HP_{86}	—	April 21, 2012	Kitt Peak	Spacewatch	·	890 m	MPC · JPL
519526	2012 HG_{87}	—	May 3, 2008	Kitt Peak	Spacewatch	·	820 m	MPC · JPL
519527	2012 JY_{45}	—	January 14, 2011	Kitt Peak	Spacewatch	T_{j} (2.98)	3.5 km	MPC · JPL
519528	2012 JW_{54}	—	January 4, 2011	Mount Lemmon	Mount Lemmon Survey	·	1.3 km	MPC · JPL
519529	2012 JT_{67}	—	May 14, 2012	Mount Lemmon	Mount Lemmon Survey	DOR	1.8 km	MPC · JPL
519530	2012 JW_{67}	—	October 1, 2005	Kitt Peak	Spacewatch	·	1.2 km	MPC · JPL
519531	2012 JY_{67}	—	March 10, 2007	Kitt Peak	Spacewatch	MIS	2.1 km	MPC · JPL
519532	2012 KS_{4}	—	February 8, 2011	Mount Lemmon	Mount Lemmon Survey	·	2.3 km	MPC · JPL
519533	2012 KD_{22}	—	November 26, 2009	Kitt Peak	Spacewatch	·	2.6 km	MPC · JPL
519534	2012 KG_{52}	—	December 11, 2010	Kitt Peak	Spacewatch	·	1.6 km	MPC · JPL
519535	2012 KO_{52}	—	January 29, 2011	Mount Lemmon	Mount Lemmon Survey	·	1.3 km	MPC · JPL
519536	2012 KP_{52}	—	May 23, 2012	Mount Lemmon	Mount Lemmon Survey	·	1.4 km	MPC · JPL
519537	2012 KS_{52}	—	January 6, 2010	Kitt Peak	Spacewatch	·	2.0 km	MPC · JPL
519538	2012 LV_{4}	—	December 8, 2010	Mount Lemmon	Mount Lemmon Survey	EUN	1.2 km	MPC · JPL
519539	2012 LS_{14}	—	June 15, 2012	Haleakala	Pan-STARRS 1	·	1.2 km	MPC · JPL
519540	2012 MQ_{16}	—	June 23, 2012	Mount Lemmon	Mount Lemmon Survey	GEF	1.1 km	MPC · JPL
519541	2012 OW	—	October 18, 2009	Mount Lemmon	Mount Lemmon Survey	·	1.2 km	MPC · JPL
519542	2012 PA_{45}	—	August 10, 2012	Kitt Peak	Spacewatch	EOS	1.7 km	MPC · JPL
519543	2012 PB_{45}	—	February 1, 2006	Kitt Peak	Spacewatch	EUN	1.4 km	MPC · JPL
519544	2012 PC_{45}	—	September 25, 2008	Mount Lemmon	Mount Lemmon Survey	EUN	1.2 km	MPC · JPL
519545	2012 PG_{45}	—	August 14, 2012	Haleakala	Pan-STARRS 1	MAR	990 m	MPC · JPL
519546	2012 QF_{53}	—	August 17, 2012	Haleakala	Pan-STARRS 1	·	1.5 km	MPC · JPL
519547	2012 QG_{53}	—	December 16, 2009	Mount Lemmon	Mount Lemmon Survey	·	1.3 km	MPC · JPL
519548	2012 QJ_{53}	—	August 25, 2012	Kitt Peak	Spacewatch	·	3.0 km	MPC · JPL
519549	2012 QL_{53}	—	October 26, 2008	Mount Lemmon	Mount Lemmon Survey	·	1.4 km	MPC · JPL
519550	2012 QN_{53}	—	July 18, 2006	Siding Spring	SSS	·	3.3 km	MPC · JPL
519551	2012 QO_{53}	—	April 27, 2011	Kitt Peak	Spacewatch	·	2.1 km	MPC · JPL
519552	2012 QP_{53}	—	August 26, 2012	Kitt Peak	Spacewatch	·	2.2 km	MPC · JPL
519553	2012 QQ_{53}	—	August 26, 2012	Kitt Peak	Spacewatch	·	2.0 km	MPC · JPL
519554	2012 QS_{53}	—	August 26, 2012	Haleakala	Pan-STARRS 1	·	1.3 km	MPC · JPL
519555	2012 QT_{53}	—	August 26, 2012	Haleakala	Pan-STARRS 1	EOS	1.6 km	MPC · JPL
519556	2012 QW_{53}	—	November 7, 2008	Mount Lemmon	Mount Lemmon Survey	AGN	1.2 km	MPC · JPL
519557	2012 QX_{53}	—	September 30, 2003	Kitt Peak	Spacewatch	·	2.5 km	MPC · JPL
519558	2012 QA_{54}	—	September 20, 2003	Kitt Peak	Spacewatch	·	1.5 km	MPC · JPL
519559	2012 RG_{44}	—	October 7, 2007	Kitt Peak	Spacewatch	·	2.4 km	MPC · JPL
519560	2012 RJ_{44}	—	September 14, 2012	Mount Lemmon	Mount Lemmon Survey	·	2.2 km	MPC · JPL
519561	2012 RM_{44}	—	September 15, 2012	Kitt Peak	Spacewatch	·	2.5 km	MPC · JPL
519562	2012 RN_{44}	—	August 21, 2006	Kitt Peak	Spacewatch	·	2.6 km	MPC · JPL
519563	2012 SO_{13}	—	February 23, 2011	Kitt Peak	Spacewatch	·	650 m	MPC · JPL
519564	2012 SH_{68}	—	May 1, 2011	Haleakala	Pan-STARRS 1	·	870 m	MPC · JPL
519565	2012 SU_{69}	—	December 29, 2008	Mount Lemmon	Mount Lemmon Survey	·	2.4 km	MPC · JPL
519566	2012 SV_{69}	—	September 16, 2012	Kitt Peak	Spacewatch	·	2.0 km	MPC · JPL
519567	2012 SY_{69}	—	August 14, 2012	Haleakala	Pan-STARRS 1	·	2.6 km	MPC · JPL
519568	2012 SZ_{69}	—	November 8, 2007	Catalina	CSS	·	2.5 km	MPC · JPL
519569	2012 SB_{70}	—	September 16, 2012	Kitt Peak	Spacewatch	·	1.9 km	MPC · JPL
519570	2012 SH_{70}	—	October 19, 2007	Catalina	CSS	EOS	2.3 km	MPC · JPL
519571	2012 SK_{70}	—	September 19, 2012	Mount Lemmon	Mount Lemmon Survey	·	2.8 km	MPC · JPL
519572	2012 SL_{70}	—	September 30, 2003	Kitt Peak	Spacewatch	·	1.5 km	MPC · JPL
519573	2012 SR_{70}	—	October 25, 2008	Kitt Peak	Spacewatch	·	1.0 km	MPC · JPL
519574	2012 ST_{70}	—	October 12, 2007	Kitt Peak	Spacewatch	·	1.4 km	MPC · JPL
519575	2012 SV_{70}	—	September 21, 2012	Kitt Peak	Spacewatch	JUN	760 m	MPC · JPL
519576	2012 SA_{71}	—	September 21, 2012	Mount Lemmon	Mount Lemmon Survey	·	1.9 km	MPC · JPL
519577	2012 SF_{71}	—	September 23, 2012	Kitt Peak	Spacewatch	·	1.1 km	MPC · JPL
519578	2012 SG_{71}	—	April 30, 2006	Kitt Peak	Spacewatch	MAR	1.3 km	MPC · JPL
519579	2012 SH_{71}	—	October 1, 2005	Catalina	CSS	·	800 m	MPC · JPL
519580	2012 SK_{71}	—	October 8, 2008	Mount Lemmon	Mount Lemmon Survey	·	970 m	MPC · JPL
519581	2012 SM_{71}	—	September 25, 2012	Mount Lemmon	Mount Lemmon Survey	EOS	1.7 km	MPC · JPL
519582	2012 SO_{71}	—	April 11, 2005	Mount Lemmon	Mount Lemmon Survey	·	2.2 km	MPC · JPL
519583	2012 SQ_{71}	—	September 25, 2011	Haleakala	Pan-STARRS 1	·	2.1 km	MPC · JPL
519584	2012 TD_{28}	—	September 29, 2003	Kitt Peak	Spacewatch	NEM	2.1 km	MPC · JPL
519585	2012 TC_{280}	—	October 11, 2012	Haleakala	Pan-STARRS 1	·	990 m	MPC · JPL
519586	2012 TW_{309}	—	October 11, 2012	Haleakala	Pan-STARRS 1	·	660 m	MPC · JPL
519587	2012 TU_{327}	—	October 10, 2012	Mount Lemmon	Mount Lemmon Survey	PHO	1.0 km	MPC · JPL
519588	2012 TA_{328}	—	October 9, 2007	Kitt Peak	Spacewatch	·	1.7 km	MPC · JPL
519589	2012 TC_{328}	—	October 10, 2007	Catalina	CSS	·	1.8 km	MPC · JPL
519590	2012 TE_{328}	—	October 8, 2012	Mount Lemmon	Mount Lemmon Survey	EOS	1.4 km	MPC · JPL
519591	2012 TF_{328}	—	October 8, 2012	Kitt Peak	Spacewatch	·	2.4 km	MPC · JPL
519592	2012 TJ_{328}	—	October 8, 2012	Kitt Peak	Spacewatch	·	1.6 km	MPC · JPL
519593	2012 TL_{328}	—	October 8, 2012	Kitt Peak	Spacewatch	·	2.9 km	MPC · JPL
519594	2012 TR_{328}	—	October 8, 2012	Kitt Peak	Spacewatch	·	2.3 km	MPC · JPL
519595	2012 TT_{328}	—	November 6, 2008	Kitt Peak	Spacewatch	EUN	840 m	MPC · JPL
519596	2012 TU_{328}	—	September 18, 2012	Mount Lemmon	Mount Lemmon Survey	·	3.3 km	MPC · JPL
519597	2012 TB_{329}	—	April 6, 2011	Kitt Peak	Spacewatch	·	1.4 km	MPC · JPL
519598	2012 TE_{329}	—	October 8, 2012	Mount Lemmon	Mount Lemmon Survey	EOS	1.8 km	MPC · JPL
519599	2012 TF_{329}	—	October 9, 2012	Mount Lemmon	Mount Lemmon Survey	·	1.6 km	MPC · JPL
519600	2012 TR_{329}	—	October 10, 2012	Haleakala	Pan-STARRS 1	·	1.5 km	MPC · JPL

== 519601–519700 ==
back to top

Designation			Discovery			Properties		Ref
Permanent	Provisional	Named after	Date	Site	Discoverer(s)	Category	Diam.	Ref
519601	2012 TT_{329}	—	October 11, 2012	Haleakala	Pan-STARRS 1	·	2.7 km	MPC · JPL
519602	2012 TZ_{329}	—	October 13, 2012	Kitt Peak	Spacewatch	V	690 m	MPC · JPL
519603	2012 TA_{330}	—	October 11, 2012	Mount Lemmon	Mount Lemmon Survey	MIS	2.0 km	MPC · JPL
519604	2012 TB_{330}	—	November 5, 2007	Kitt Peak	Spacewatch	·	2.7 km	MPC · JPL
519605	2012 TC_{330}	—	November 14, 2007	Kitt Peak	Spacewatch	·	2.0 km	MPC · JPL
519606	2012 TK_{330}	—	October 10, 2007	Mount Lemmon	Mount Lemmon Survey	·	1.9 km	MPC · JPL
519607	2012 TO_{330}	—	April 8, 2006	Kitt Peak	Spacewatch	·	2.5 km	MPC · JPL
519608	2012 UD_{39}	—	October 27, 2005	Kitt Peak	Spacewatch	V	680 m	MPC · JPL
519609	2012 UH_{53}	—	December 18, 2004	Kitt Peak	Spacewatch	·	1.7 km	MPC · JPL
519610	2012 UN_{68}	—	October 6, 2012	Kitt Peak	Spacewatch	·	570 m	MPC · JPL
519611	2012 UF_{103}	—	November 5, 2007	Kitt Peak	Spacewatch	·	2.0 km	MPC · JPL
519612	2012 UY_{180}	—	November 17, 2007	Kitt Peak	Spacewatch	·	3.0 km	MPC · JPL
519613	2012 UZ_{180}	—	February 25, 2006	Kitt Peak	Spacewatch	MIS	2.5 km	MPC · JPL
519614	2012 UA_{181}	—	October 17, 2012	Haleakala	Pan-STARRS 1	·	1.6 km	MPC · JPL
519615	2012 UB_{181}	—	March 26, 2004	Kitt Peak	Spacewatch	EOS	1.7 km	MPC · JPL
519616	2012 UD_{181}	—	September 15, 2006	Kitt Peak	Spacewatch	·	2.4 km	MPC · JPL
519617	2012 UH_{181}	—	October 9, 2007	Mount Lemmon	Mount Lemmon Survey	KOR	1.2 km	MPC · JPL
519618	2012 UK_{181}	—	October 18, 2012	Haleakala	Pan-STARRS 1	·	1.6 km	MPC · JPL
519619	2012 UL_{181}	—	October 30, 2007	Kitt Peak	Spacewatch	EOS	1.6 km	MPC · JPL
519620	2012 UO_{181}	—	October 18, 2012	Haleakala	Pan-STARRS 1	·	1.1 km	MPC · JPL
519621	2012 UQ_{181}	—	October 18, 2012	Haleakala	Pan-STARRS 1	·	2.2 km	MPC · JPL
519622	2012 UR_{181}	—	October 18, 2012	Haleakala	Pan-STARRS 1	·	2.6 km	MPC · JPL
519623	2012 US_{181}	—	October 18, 2012	Haleakala	Pan-STARRS 1	EOS	1.7 km	MPC · JPL
519624	2012 UX_{181}	—	August 2, 2011	Haleakala	Pan-STARRS 1	·	2.5 km	MPC · JPL
519625	2012 UZ_{181}	—	March 23, 2003	Kitt Peak	Spacewatch	·	2.6 km	MPC · JPL
519626	2012 UC_{182}	—	October 19, 2012	Haleakala	Pan-STARRS 1	HOF	2.5 km	MPC · JPL
519627	2012 UG_{182}	—	October 20, 2012	Haleakala	Pan-STARRS 1	·	1.9 km	MPC · JPL
519628	2012 UH_{182}	—	February 10, 2008	Kitt Peak	Spacewatch	·	3.1 km	MPC · JPL
519629	2012 UL_{182}	—	February 19, 2009	Kitt Peak	Spacewatch	·	2.1 km	MPC · JPL
519630	2012 UN_{182}	—	October 12, 2006	Kitt Peak	Spacewatch	·	3.8 km	MPC · JPL
519631	2012 UO_{182}	—	May 24, 2011	Haleakala	Pan-STARRS 1	·	1.3 km	MPC · JPL
519632	2012 UP_{182}	—	October 7, 2008	Mount Lemmon	Mount Lemmon Survey	·	1.1 km	MPC · JPL
519633	2012 UQ_{182}	—	December 5, 2007	Kitt Peak	Spacewatch	·	3.4 km	MPC · JPL
519634	2012 US_{182}	—	November 13, 2007	Kitt Peak	Spacewatch	·	1.5 km	MPC · JPL
519635	2012 UT_{182}	—	October 21, 2012	Haleakala	Pan-STARRS 1	·	1.7 km	MPC · JPL
519636	2012 UV_{182}	—	January 31, 2009	Kitt Peak	Spacewatch	·	1.8 km	MPC · JPL
519637	2012 UW_{182}	—	October 6, 2008	Mount Lemmon	Mount Lemmon Survey	·	1.3 km	MPC · JPL
519638	2012 UZ_{182}	—	January 19, 2005	Kitt Peak	Spacewatch	·	1.7 km	MPC · JPL
519639	2012 UC_{183}	—	October 21, 2012	Haleakala	Pan-STARRS 1	·	1.5 km	MPC · JPL
519640	2012 UD_{183}	—	September 28, 2006	Kitt Peak	Spacewatch	TIR	2.8 km	MPC · JPL
519641	2012 UE_{183}	—	October 15, 2012	Mount Lemmon	Mount Lemmon Survey	·	2.0 km	MPC · JPL
519642	2012 UF_{183}	—	March 20, 2010	Kitt Peak	Spacewatch	·	1.5 km	MPC · JPL
519643	2012 UG_{183}	—	October 16, 2003	Kitt Peak	Spacewatch	·	1.5 km	MPC · JPL
519644	2012 UH_{183}	—	October 10, 2012	Kitt Peak	Spacewatch	·	1.8 km	MPC · JPL
519645	2012 UK_{183}	—	October 22, 2012	Haleakala	Pan-STARRS 1	AGN	1.2 km	MPC · JPL
519646	2012 UN_{183}	—	October 23, 2012	Haleakala	Pan-STARRS 1	·	1.2 km	MPC · JPL
519647	2012 UO_{183}	—	November 3, 2007	Kitt Peak	Spacewatch	·	1.6 km	MPC · JPL
519648	2012 UP_{183}	—	October 26, 2012	Mount Lemmon	Mount Lemmon Survey	·	3.5 km	MPC · JPL
519649	2012 VQ_{8}	—	April 15, 2007	Kitt Peak	Spacewatch	·	1.0 km	MPC · JPL
519650	2012 VC_{38}	—	October 20, 2012	Haleakala	Pan-STARRS 1	·	1.4 km	MPC · JPL
519651	2012 VQ_{86}	—	October 25, 2012	Kitt Peak	Spacewatch	·	1.4 km	MPC · JPL
519652	2012 VH_{104}	—	October 21, 2012	Haleakala	Pan-STARRS 1	·	1.3 km	MPC · JPL
519653	2012 VY_{114}	—	January 29, 2009	Catalina	CSS	·	1.6 km	MPC · JPL
519654	2012 VC_{115}	—	November 6, 2012	Kitt Peak	Spacewatch	EOS	2.0 km	MPC · JPL
519655	2012 VE_{115}	—	March 19, 2010	Kitt Peak	Spacewatch	·	1.2 km	MPC · JPL
519656	2012 VG_{115}	—	December 19, 2007	Kitt Peak	Spacewatch	·	1.8 km	MPC · JPL
519657	2012 VH_{115}	—	October 11, 2007	Mount Lemmon	Mount Lemmon Survey	HOF	2.2 km	MPC · JPL
519658	2012 WY_{31}	—	November 19, 2012	Kitt Peak	Spacewatch	EOS	2.5 km	MPC · JPL
519659	2012 WP_{36}	—	April 9, 2010	Kitt Peak	Spacewatch	EOS	1.8 km	MPC · JPL
519660	2012 WQ_{36}	—	August 28, 2006	Kitt Peak	Spacewatch	·	1.9 km	MPC · JPL
519661	2012 WV_{36}	—	October 19, 2007	Catalina	CSS	·	2.7 km	MPC · JPL
519662	2012 XY_{51}	—	September 12, 2007	Mount Lemmon	Mount Lemmon Survey	·	1.4 km	MPC · JPL
519663	2012 XG_{156}	—	October 26, 2012	Mount Lemmon	Mount Lemmon Survey	·	1.9 km	MPC · JPL
519664	2012 XB_{159}	—	November 30, 2008	Kitt Peak	Spacewatch	·	780 m	MPC · JPL
519665	2012 XC_{159}	—	December 7, 2012	Mount Lemmon	Mount Lemmon Survey	EOS	1.6 km	MPC · JPL
519666	2012 XD_{159}	—	December 8, 2012	Kitt Peak	Spacewatch	MAR	870 m	MPC · JPL
519667	2012 XG_{159}	—	September 4, 2011	Haleakala	Pan-STARRS 1	·	2.3 km	MPC · JPL
519668	2012 YQ_{10}	—	December 21, 2012	Mount Lemmon	Mount Lemmon Survey	·	2.4 km	MPC · JPL
519669	2012 YS_{10}	—	October 16, 2007	Kitt Peak	Spacewatch	(21344)	1.2 km	MPC · JPL
519670	2012 YU_{10}	—	February 20, 2009	Kitt Peak	Spacewatch	·	1.7 km	MPC · JPL
519671	2012 YX_{10}	—	December 22, 2012	Haleakala	Pan-STARRS 1	·	2.0 km	MPC · JPL
519672	2012 YY_{10}	—	December 3, 2007	Kitt Peak	Spacewatch	·	1.8 km	MPC · JPL
519673	2012 YD_{11}	—	October 12, 2007	Kitt Peak	Spacewatch	·	1.0 km	MPC · JPL
519674	2012 YE_{11}	—	December 23, 2012	Haleakala	Pan-STARRS 1	·	1.2 km	MPC · JPL
519675	2012 YK_{11}	—	September 2, 2011	Haleakala	Pan-STARRS 1	·	1.9 km	MPC · JPL
519676	2012 YL_{11}	—	July 5, 2010	Kitt Peak	Spacewatch	EOS	2.0 km	MPC · JPL
519677	2012 YT_{11}	—	December 23, 2012	Haleakala	Pan-STARRS 1	·	2.2 km	MPC · JPL
519678	2013 AR_{5}	—	January 13, 2008	Mount Lemmon	Mount Lemmon Survey	·	2.7 km	MPC · JPL
519679	2013 AV_{5}	—	November 5, 2012	Kitt Peak	Spacewatch	·	1.5 km	MPC · JPL
519680	2013 AP_{22}	—	January 5, 2013	Mount Lemmon	Mount Lemmon Survey	·	1.5 km	MPC · JPL
519681	2013 AN_{48}	—	January 7, 2013	Mount Lemmon	Mount Lemmon Survey	·	2.1 km	MPC · JPL
519682	2013 AS_{93}	—	February 4, 2009	Mount Lemmon	Mount Lemmon Survey	·	1.9 km	MPC · JPL
519683	2013 AC_{104}	—	December 22, 2012	Haleakala	Pan-STARRS 1	·	1.2 km	MPC · JPL
519684	2013 AT_{117}	—	November 6, 2007	Kitt Peak	Spacewatch	·	1.8 km	MPC · JPL
519685	2013 AA_{121}	—	January 13, 2013	Mount Lemmon	Mount Lemmon Survey	EOS	1.7 km	MPC · JPL
519686	2013 AO_{172}	—	March 25, 2008	Kitt Peak	Spacewatch	·	3.1 km	MPC · JPL
519687	2013 AZ_{185}	—	October 20, 2006	Kitt Peak	Spacewatch	·	2.1 km	MPC · JPL
519688	2013 AB_{186}	—	September 19, 2011	Haleakala	Pan-STARRS 1	·	1.7 km	MPC · JPL
519689	2013 AC_{186}	—	January 3, 2013	Mount Lemmon	Mount Lemmon Survey	·	2.7 km	MPC · JPL
519690	2013 AD_{186}	—	January 5, 2013	Kitt Peak	Spacewatch	615	1.5 km	MPC · JPL
519691	2013 AG_{186}	—	September 23, 2011	Kitt Peak	Spacewatch	·	1.9 km	MPC · JPL
519692	2013 AJ_{186}	—	January 5, 2013	Mount Lemmon	Mount Lemmon Survey	·	2.5 km	MPC · JPL
519693	2013 AO_{186}	—	November 18, 2007	Mount Lemmon	Mount Lemmon Survey	·	1.7 km	MPC · JPL
519694	2013 AQ_{186}	—	January 8, 2013	Kitt Peak	Spacewatch	·	2.1 km	MPC · JPL
519695	2013 AU_{186}	—	January 17, 2007	Kitt Peak	Spacewatch	HYG	2.3 km	MPC · JPL
519696	2013 AV_{186}	—	October 20, 2007	Mount Lemmon	Mount Lemmon Survey	·	1.6 km	MPC · JPL
519697	2013 AG_{187}	—	February 10, 2008	Kitt Peak	Spacewatch	·	1.6 km	MPC · JPL
519698	2013 AK_{187}	—	October 18, 2011	Mount Lemmon	Mount Lemmon Survey	·	1.3 km	MPC · JPL
519699	2013 AL_{187}	—	September 21, 2011	Kitt Peak	Spacewatch	·	1.8 km	MPC · JPL
519700	2013 AM_{187}	—	January 10, 2013	Haleakala	Pan-STARRS 1	EOS	1.5 km	MPC · JPL

== 519701–519800 ==
back to top

Designation			Discovery			Properties		Ref
Permanent	Provisional	Named after	Date	Site	Discoverer(s)	Category	Diam.	Ref
519701	2013 AS_{187}	—	January 10, 2013	Haleakala	Pan-STARRS 1	·	1.3 km	MPC · JPL
519702	2013 AT_{187}	—	January 10, 2013	Haleakala	Pan-STARRS 1	·	1.5 km	MPC · JPL
519703	2013 AW_{187}	—	January 10, 2013	Haleakala	Pan-STARRS 1	·	2.6 km	MPC · JPL
519704	2013 AZ_{187}	—	January 10, 2013	Haleakala	Pan-STARRS 1	·	1.7 km	MPC · JPL
519705	2013 AA_{188}	—	November 2, 2007	Kitt Peak	Spacewatch	·	1.4 km	MPC · JPL
519706	2013 AE_{188}	—	March 18, 2009	Kitt Peak	Spacewatch	·	1.2 km	MPC · JPL
519707	2013 AH_{188}	—	February 28, 2008	Kitt Peak	Spacewatch	·	2.3 km	MPC · JPL
519708	2013 AJ_{188}	—	June 19, 2010	Mount Lemmon	Mount Lemmon Survey	·	1.7 km	MPC · JPL
519709	2013 AK_{188}	—	February 13, 2008	Mount Lemmon	Mount Lemmon Survey	·	2.6 km	MPC · JPL
519710	2013 BP_{22}	—	March 26, 2004	Kitt Peak	Spacewatch	·	2.7 km	MPC · JPL
519711	2013 BZ_{28}	—	September 19, 2011	Haleakala	Pan-STARRS 1	·	1.4 km	MPC · JPL
519712	2013 BP_{44}	—	January 5, 2013	Mount Lemmon	Mount Lemmon Survey	·	1.8 km	MPC · JPL
519713	2013 BP_{74}	—	November 9, 2007	Kitt Peak	Spacewatch	AGN	1.1 km	MPC · JPL
519714	2013 BK_{80}	—	March 3, 2009	Catalina	CSS	·	1.4 km	MPC · JPL
519715	2013 BV_{83}	—	March 5, 2008	Kitt Peak	Spacewatch	·	2.7 km	MPC · JPL
519716	2013 BY_{83}	—	January 9, 2013	Kitt Peak	Spacewatch	·	2.7 km	MPC · JPL
519717	2013 BA_{84}	—	February 13, 2008	Mount Lemmon	Mount Lemmon Survey	THM	2.1 km	MPC · JPL
519718	2013 BB_{84}	—	December 5, 2007	Kitt Peak	Spacewatch	DOR	2.0 km	MPC · JPL
519719	2013 BC_{84}	—	January 19, 2013	Mount Lemmon	Mount Lemmon Survey	·	2.4 km	MPC · JPL
519720	2013 BF_{84}	—	January 17, 2007	Catalina	CSS	THB	2.8 km	MPC · JPL
519721	2013 BH_{84}	—	September 5, 2010	Mount Lemmon	Mount Lemmon Survey	·	1.8 km	MPC · JPL
519722	2013 BM_{84}	—	October 24, 2011	Haleakala	Pan-STARRS 1	EOS	1.5 km	MPC · JPL
519723	2013 BN_{84}	—	February 13, 2008	Kitt Peak	Spacewatch	·	2.1 km	MPC · JPL
519724	2013 CK_{6}	—	January 10, 2013	Haleakala	Pan-STARRS 1	·	1.2 km	MPC · JPL
519725	2013 CV_{7}	—	September 24, 2011	Haleakala	Pan-STARRS 1	EOS	1.8 km	MPC · JPL
519726	2013 CA_{26}	—	January 5, 2013	Mount Lemmon	Mount Lemmon Survey	JUN	760 m	MPC · JPL
519727	2013 CL_{179}	—	September 25, 2011	Haleakala	Pan-STARRS 1	·	1.6 km	MPC · JPL
519728	2013 CX_{192}	—	October 1, 2011	Mount Lemmon	Mount Lemmon Survey	·	2.0 km	MPC · JPL
519729	2013 CH_{207}	—	February 11, 2013	Catalina	CSS	CLO	3.4 km	MPC · JPL
519730	2013 CR_{207}	—	May 15, 2009	Kitt Peak	Spacewatch	·	1.6 km	MPC · JPL
519731	2013 CE_{224}	—	December 18, 2007	Kitt Peak	Spacewatch	·	1.8 km	MPC · JPL
519732	2013 CK_{224}	—	October 21, 2011	Mount Lemmon	Mount Lemmon Survey	·	1.4 km	MPC · JPL
519733	2013 CL_{225}	—	April 28, 2009	Mount Lemmon	Mount Lemmon Survey	·	1.5 km	MPC · JPL
519734	2013 CZ_{225}	—	February 5, 2013	Kitt Peak	Spacewatch	·	2.1 km	MPC · JPL
519735	2013 CA_{226}	—	July 22, 2006	Mount Lemmon	Mount Lemmon Survey	·	2.0 km	MPC · JPL
519736	2013 CB_{226}	—	August 30, 2005	Kitt Peak	Spacewatch	KOR	1.7 km	MPC · JPL
519737	2013 CE_{226}	—	July 28, 2009	Catalina	CSS	·	2.7 km	MPC · JPL
519738	2013 CH_{226}	—	September 13, 2005	Kitt Peak	Spacewatch	·	1.9 km	MPC · JPL
519739	2013 CJ_{226}	—	March 29, 2008	Kitt Peak	Spacewatch	·	2.0 km	MPC · JPL
519740	2013 CK_{226}	—	August 23, 2004	Kitt Peak	Spacewatch	·	2.3 km	MPC · JPL
519741	2013 CM_{226}	—	April 1, 2009	Mount Lemmon	Mount Lemmon Survey	·	1.4 km	MPC · JPL
519742	2013 CN_{226}	—	September 17, 2006	Kitt Peak	Spacewatch	·	1.5 km	MPC · JPL
519743	2013 CO_{226}	—	March 1, 2008	Kitt Peak	Spacewatch	·	2.3 km	MPC · JPL
519744	2013 CS_{226}	—	February 8, 2013	Haleakala	Pan-STARRS 1	·	1.6 km	MPC · JPL
519745	2013 CV_{226}	—	October 18, 2011	Haleakala	Pan-STARRS 1	·	2.6 km	MPC · JPL
519746	2013 CX_{226}	—	November 2, 2010	Mount Lemmon	Mount Lemmon Survey	·	3.0 km	MPC · JPL
519747	2013 CY_{226}	—	November 20, 2004	Kitt Peak	Spacewatch	·	3.7 km	MPC · JPL
519748	2013 CM_{227}	—	February 19, 2009	Kitt Peak	Spacewatch	·	900 m	MPC · JPL
519749	2013 CS_{227}	—	September 29, 2011	Kitt Peak	Spacewatch	·	2.8 km	MPC · JPL
519750	2013 CT_{227}	—	February 15, 2013	Haleakala	Pan-STARRS 1	NAE	1.7 km	MPC · JPL
519751	2013 CX_{227}	—	August 20, 2006	Kitt Peak	Spacewatch	·	1.5 km	MPC · JPL
519752	2013 CY_{227}	—	September 27, 2006	Kitt Peak	Spacewatch	AGN	1.1 km	MPC · JPL
519753	2013 CZ_{227}	—	February 15, 2013	Haleakala	Pan-STARRS 1	·	1.9 km	MPC · JPL
519754	2013 CC_{228}	—	January 27, 2007	Kitt Peak	Spacewatch	·	3.1 km	MPC · JPL
519755	2013 CD_{228}	—	September 4, 2011	Haleakala	Pan-STARRS 1	·	1.5 km	MPC · JPL
519756	2013 CE_{228}	—	August 28, 2006	Kitt Peak	Spacewatch	·	2.0 km	MPC · JPL
519757	2013 DD_{17}	—	February 16, 2013	Mount Lemmon	Mount Lemmon Survey	·	1.2 km	MPC · JPL
519758	2013 DJ_{17}	—	January 10, 2007	Mount Lemmon	Mount Lemmon Survey	·	2.7 km	MPC · JPL
519759	2013 DK_{17}	—	September 10, 2010	Kitt Peak	Spacewatch	·	2.3 km	MPC · JPL
519760	2013 DM_{17}	—	February 17, 2013	Kitt Peak	Spacewatch	·	2.2 km	MPC · JPL
519761	2013 DN_{17}	—	March 6, 2013	Haleakala	Pan-STARRS 1	·	2.2 km	MPC · JPL
519762	2013 EE_{24}	—	May 15, 2009	Catalina	CSS	·	1.8 km	MPC · JPL
519763	2013 EV_{62}	—	October 26, 2011	Haleakala	Pan-STARRS 1	·	1.2 km	MPC · JPL
519764	2013 EL_{75}	—	January 19, 2008	Mount Lemmon	Mount Lemmon Survey	DOR	1.9 km	MPC · JPL
519765	2013 EA_{94}	—	April 22, 2004	Campo Imperatore	CINEOS	·	1.9 km	MPC · JPL
519766	2013 EQ_{96}	—	October 3, 2006	Mount Lemmon	Mount Lemmon Survey	(12739)	1.6 km	MPC · JPL
519767	2013 ED_{132}	—	August 31, 2005	Kitt Peak	Spacewatch	·	1.5 km	MPC · JPL
519768	2013 EB_{151}	—	January 1, 2012	Mount Lemmon	Mount Lemmon Survey	·	3.0 km	MPC · JPL
519769	2013 EV_{155}	—	September 30, 2010	Mount Lemmon	Mount Lemmon Survey	AGN	990 m	MPC · JPL
519770	2013 EO_{156}	—	November 8, 2007	Kitt Peak	Spacewatch	·	1.2 km	MPC · JPL
519771	2013 ER_{156}	—	March 5, 2013	Haleakala	Pan-STARRS 1	·	1.3 km	MPC · JPL
519772	2013 EX_{156}	—	March 5, 2013	Haleakala	Pan-STARRS 1	·	2.5 km	MPC · JPL
519773	2013 EC_{157}	—	January 27, 2007	Mount Lemmon	Mount Lemmon Survey	·	2.8 km	MPC · JPL
519774	2013 EL_{157}	—	April 1, 2008	Kitt Peak	Spacewatch	·	1.7 km	MPC · JPL
519775	2013 EN_{157}	—	February 21, 2007	Kitt Peak	Spacewatch	·	2.6 km	MPC · JPL
519776	2013 EO_{157}	—	April 4, 2008	Mount Lemmon	Mount Lemmon Survey	EOS	1.5 km	MPC · JPL
519777	2013 ER_{157}	—	October 27, 2005	Kitt Peak	Spacewatch	·	2.0 km	MPC · JPL
519778	2013 ET_{157}	—	October 26, 2005	Kitt Peak	Spacewatch	HYG	2.2 km	MPC · JPL
519779	2013 EX_{157}	—	March 30, 2008	Kitt Peak	Spacewatch	·	1.6 km	MPC · JPL
519780	2013 EA_{158}	—	May 3, 2008	Mount Lemmon	Mount Lemmon Survey	VER	2.2 km	MPC · JPL
519781	2013 EB_{158}	—	October 5, 2005	Kitt Peak	Spacewatch	LIX	3.2 km	MPC · JPL
519782	2013 FF_{16}	—	February 6, 2008	Catalina	CSS	·	1.6 km	MPC · JPL
519783	2013 FP_{21}	—	March 5, 2013	Haleakala	Pan-STARRS 1	·	1.8 km	MPC · JPL
519784	2013 FQ_{29}	—	October 17, 2010	Mount Lemmon	Mount Lemmon Survey	VER	2.6 km	MPC · JPL
519785	2013 FR_{29}	—	March 15, 2004	Kitt Peak	Spacewatch	MIS	2.3 km	MPC · JPL
519786	2013 FU_{29}	—	September 28, 2006	Kitt Peak	Spacewatch	·	1.1 km	MPC · JPL
519787	2013 GB_{39}	—	March 11, 2013	Mount Lemmon	Mount Lemmon Survey	·	1.8 km	MPC · JPL
519788	2013 GR_{39}	—	October 12, 2010	Mount Lemmon	Mount Lemmon Survey	·	2.7 km	MPC · JPL
519789	2013 GX_{52}	—	April 3, 2008	Mount Lemmon	Mount Lemmon Survey	BRA	1.1 km	MPC · JPL
519790	2013 GQ_{73}	—	January 2, 2012	Mount Lemmon	Mount Lemmon Survey	·	1.9 km	MPC · JPL
519791	2013 GX_{76}	—	March 13, 2013	Kitt Peak	Spacewatch	·	1.9 km	MPC · JPL
519792	2013 GP_{100}	—	April 6, 2013	Catalina	CSS	H	470 m	MPC · JPL
519793	2013 GS_{109}	—	April 10, 2013	Mount Lemmon	Mount Lemmon Survey	·	1.3 km	MPC · JPL
519794	2013 GK_{118}	—	October 14, 2010	Mount Lemmon	Mount Lemmon Survey	AGN	930 m	MPC · JPL
519795	2013 GL_{140}	—	April 11, 2013	Kitt Peak	Spacewatch	·	1.9 km	MPC · JPL
519796	2013 GN_{140}	—	December 2, 2010	Mount Lemmon	Mount Lemmon Survey	·	1.6 km	MPC · JPL
519797	2013 GO_{140}	—	April 30, 2008	Mount Lemmon	Mount Lemmon Survey	·	2.4 km	MPC · JPL
519798	2013 GP_{140}	—	April 11, 2013	Kitt Peak	Spacewatch	·	1.6 km	MPC · JPL
519799	2013 GQ_{140}	—	December 14, 2010	Mount Lemmon	Mount Lemmon Survey	EOS	1.9 km	MPC · JPL
519800	2013 GU_{140}	—	October 17, 1998	Kitt Peak	Spacewatch	·	1.9 km	MPC · JPL

== 519801–519900 ==
back to top

Designation			Discovery			Properties		Ref
Permanent	Provisional	Named after	Date	Site	Discoverer(s)	Category	Diam.	Ref
519801	2013 GB_{141}	—	November 11, 2010	Kitt Peak	Spacewatch	·	1.7 km	MPC · JPL
519802	2013 GC_{141}	—	November 2, 2010	Mount Lemmon	Mount Lemmon Survey	·	1.1 km	MPC · JPL
519803	2013 GJ_{141}	—	March 13, 2007	Kitt Peak	Spacewatch	·	2.1 km	MPC · JPL
519804	2013 GL_{141}	—	September 5, 2010	Mount Lemmon	Mount Lemmon Survey	·	1.0 km	MPC · JPL
519805	2013 HW_{18}	—	August 30, 2011	Haleakala	Pan-STARRS 1	H	470 m	MPC · JPL
519806	2013 HN_{31}	—	December 28, 2011	Mount Lemmon	Mount Lemmon Survey	EOS	1.6 km	MPC · JPL
519807	2013 HM_{57}	—	April 9, 2013	Haleakala	Pan-STARRS 1	·	1.9 km	MPC · JPL
519808	2013 HP_{58}	—	April 9, 2013	Haleakala	Pan-STARRS 1	·	2.4 km	MPC · JPL
519809	2013 HK_{68}	—	June 27, 2010	WISE	WISE	·	1.8 km	MPC · JPL
519810	2013 HG_{107}	—	April 8, 2013	Mount Lemmon	Mount Lemmon Survey	·	2.4 km	MPC · JPL
519811	2013 HG_{113}	—	September 5, 2010	Mount Lemmon	Mount Lemmon Survey	·	2.7 km	MPC · JPL
519812	2013 HW_{115}	—	February 28, 2008	Kitt Peak	Spacewatch	·	1.5 km	MPC · JPL
519813	2013 HC_{116}	—	April 10, 2013	Haleakala	Pan-STARRS 1	BRA	890 m	MPC · JPL
519814	2013 HL_{124}	—	August 12, 2010	Kitt Peak	Spacewatch	·	1.5 km	MPC · JPL
519815	2013 HQ_{136}	—	October 2, 2006	Kitt Peak	Spacewatch	·	1.3 km	MPC · JPL
519816	2013 HK_{145}	—	September 26, 2005	Kitt Peak	Spacewatch	(13314)	1.8 km	MPC · JPL
519817	2013 HN_{157}	—	November 12, 2005	Kitt Peak	Spacewatch	·	2.0 km	MPC · JPL
519818	2013 HQ_{157}	—	January 26, 2012	Mount Lemmon	Mount Lemmon Survey	·	2.3 km	MPC · JPL
519819	2013 HR_{157}	—	June 13, 2005	Mount Lemmon	Mount Lemmon Survey	·	1.1 km	MPC · JPL
519820	2013 HT_{157}	—	April 19, 2013	Haleakala	Pan-STARRS 1	·	2.3 km	MPC · JPL
519821	2013 HD_{158}	—	January 26, 2012	Mount Lemmon	Mount Lemmon Survey	·	1.9 km	MPC · JPL
519822	2013 HF_{158}	—	May 12, 2007	Mount Lemmon	Mount Lemmon Survey	·	3.4 km	MPC · JPL
519823	2013 JC_{18}	—	April 17, 2013	Haleakala	Pan-STARRS 1	H	290 m	MPC · JPL
519824	2013 JY_{35}	—	May 13, 2013	Catalina	CSS	APO	470 m	MPC · JPL
519825	2013 JN_{66}	—	April 29, 2008	Mount Lemmon	Mount Lemmon Survey	·	1.8 km	MPC · JPL
519826	2013 JX_{66}	—	November 20, 2006	Kitt Peak	Spacewatch	·	1.8 km	MPC · JPL
519827	2013 JB_{67}	—	May 15, 2013	Haleakala	Pan-STARRS 1	·	2.6 km	MPC · JPL
519828	2013 JC_{67}	—	May 15, 2013	Haleakala	Pan-STARRS 1	·	2.5 km	MPC · JPL
519829	2013 JE_{67}	—	October 11, 2009	Mount Lemmon	Mount Lemmon Survey	·	1.9 km	MPC · JPL
519830	2013 JG_{67}	—	May 15, 2013	Haleakala	Pan-STARRS 1	·	2.1 km	MPC · JPL
519831	2013 JH_{67}	—	May 15, 2013	Haleakala	Pan-STARRS 1	·	2.7 km	MPC · JPL
519832	2013 JJ_{67}	—	May 15, 2013	Haleakala	Pan-STARRS 1	·	1.8 km	MPC · JPL
519833	2013 JN_{67}	—	October 23, 2009	Kitt Peak	Spacewatch	·	2.2 km	MPC · JPL
519834	2013 KH_{19}	—	May 16, 2013	Haleakala	Pan-STARRS 1	BRA	1.9 km	MPC · JPL
519835	2013 KL_{19}	—	March 12, 2007	Mount Lemmon	Mount Lemmon Survey	·	3.4 km	MPC · JPL
519836	2013 LL_{1}	—	January 29, 2010	WISE	WISE	·	3.7 km	MPC · JPL
519837	2013 LX_{24}	—	December 17, 2001	Socorro	LINEAR	H	410 m	MPC · JPL
519838	2013 LZ_{26}	—	February 5, 2010	WISE	WISE	·	3.1 km	MPC · JPL
519839	2013 LM_{28}	—	June 2, 2013	Kitt Peak	Spacewatch	·	1.9 km	MPC · JPL
519840	2013 LC_{30}	—	May 15, 2013	Haleakala	Pan-STARRS 1	H	500 m	MPC · JPL
519841	2013 LJ_{30}	—	November 27, 2010	Mount Lemmon	Mount Lemmon Survey	·	2.0 km	MPC · JPL
519842	2013 LP_{32}	—	May 15, 2013	Haleakala	Pan-STARRS 1	·	2.3 km	MPC · JPL
519843	2013 LL_{36}	—	March 1, 2004	Kitt Peak	Spacewatch	·	1.7 km	MPC · JPL
519844	2013 LM_{36}	—	April 6, 2008	Mount Lemmon	Mount Lemmon Survey	·	1.5 km	MPC · JPL
519845	2013 LO_{36}	—	November 3, 2005	Mount Lemmon	Mount Lemmon Survey	·	1.7 km	MPC · JPL
519846	2013 LP_{36}	—	April 14, 2007	Kitt Peak	Spacewatch	·	2.2 km	MPC · JPL
519847	2013 MF_{3}	—	October 23, 2011	Haleakala	Pan-STARRS 1	H	600 m	MPC · JPL
519848	2013 MV_{12}	—	June 17, 2009	Mount Lemmon	Mount Lemmon Survey	·	1.1 km	MPC · JPL
519849	2013 MW_{12}	—	July 29, 2009	Kitt Peak	Spacewatch	EUN	950 m	MPC · JPL
519850	2013 MZ_{12}	—	April 27, 2008	Kitt Peak	Spacewatch	·	1.6 km	MPC · JPL
519851	2013 MB_{13}	—	January 31, 2006	Kitt Peak	Spacewatch	·	2.0 km	MPC · JPL
519852	2013 MK_{13}	—	May 28, 2008	Mount Lemmon	Mount Lemmon Survey	·	1.4 km	MPC · JPL
519853	2013 MP_{13}	—	October 9, 2008	Mount Lemmon	Mount Lemmon Survey	·	3.6 km	MPC · JPL
519854	2013 MQ_{13}	—	October 17, 2010	Mount Lemmon	Mount Lemmon Survey	V	800 m	MPC · JPL
519855	2013 MR_{13}	—	June 20, 2013	Haleakala	Pan-STARRS 1	·	1.3 km	MPC · JPL
519856	2013 NK_{11}	—	March 27, 2012	Mount Lemmon	Mount Lemmon Survey	EOS	2.3 km	MPC · JPL
519857	2013 NF_{28}	—	February 27, 2012	Haleakala	Pan-STARRS 1	·	1.1 km	MPC · JPL
519858	2013 NH_{28}	—	February 26, 2012	Haleakala	Pan-STARRS 1	·	2.2 km	MPC · JPL
519859	2013 NT_{28}	—	July 2, 2013	Haleakala	Pan-STARRS 1	V	530 m	MPC · JPL
519860	2013 NW_{28}	—	August 18, 2009	Kitt Peak	Spacewatch	·	1.6 km	MPC · JPL
519861	2013 NX_{28}	—	July 2, 2013	Haleakala	Pan-STARRS 1	·	3.1 km	MPC · JPL
519862	2013 NF_{29}	—	February 12, 2011	Mount Lemmon	Mount Lemmon Survey	·	1.5 km	MPC · JPL
519863	2013 NG_{29}	—	July 13, 2013	Haleakala	Pan-STARRS 1	·	1.5 km	MPC · JPL
519864	2013 NQ_{29}	—	January 23, 2006	Mount Lemmon	Mount Lemmon Survey	·	2.1 km	MPC · JPL
519865	2013 NS_{29}	—	July 14, 2013	Haleakala	Pan-STARRS 1	·	860 m	MPC · JPL
519866	2013 NV_{29}	—	July 14, 2013	Haleakala	Pan-STARRS 1	·	980 m	MPC · JPL
519867	2013 NC_{30}	—	July 14, 2013	Haleakala	Pan-STARRS 1	·	940 m	MPC · JPL
519868	2013 ND_{30}	—	April 27, 2012	Haleakala	Pan-STARRS 1	·	1.1 km	MPC · JPL
519869	2013 NP_{30}	—	September 21, 2009	Kitt Peak	Spacewatch	·	1.5 km	MPC · JPL
519870	2013 NS_{30}	—	September 5, 2008	Kitt Peak	Spacewatch	·	2.9 km	MPC · JPL
519871	2013 NC_{31}	—	July 14, 2013	Haleakala	Pan-STARRS 1	CYB	3.6 km	MPC · JPL
519872	2013 NE_{31}	—	July 14, 2013	Haleakala	Pan-STARRS 1	·	2.3 km	MPC · JPL
519873	2013 NJ_{31}	—	July 14, 2013	Haleakala	Pan-STARRS 1	EUN	1.0 km	MPC · JPL
519874	2013 NK_{31}	—	October 9, 2004	Kitt Peak	Spacewatch	·	2.0 km	MPC · JPL
519875	2013 NL_{31}	—	July 14, 2013	Haleakala	Pan-STARRS 1	EOS	2.0 km	MPC · JPL
519876	2013 NP_{31}	—	April 1, 2008	Mount Lemmon	Mount Lemmon Survey	·	1.1 km	MPC · JPL
519877	2013 NX_{31}	—	March 3, 2011	Mount Lemmon	Mount Lemmon Survey	·	2.7 km	MPC · JPL
519878	2013 NO_{32}	—	July 15, 2013	Haleakala	Pan-STARRS 1	·	800 m	MPC · JPL
519879	2013 NY_{32}	—	October 10, 2008	Mount Lemmon	Mount Lemmon Survey	·	2.5 km	MPC · JPL
519880	2013 NB_{33}	—	October 24, 2009	Kitt Peak	Spacewatch	KOR	1.1 km	MPC · JPL
519881	2013 OH_{2}	—	January 8, 2007	Kitt Peak	Spacewatch	H	370 m	MPC · JPL
519882	2013 OH_{3}	—	January 27, 2007	Mount Lemmon	Mount Lemmon Survey	H	500 m	MPC · JPL
519883	2013 OX_{10}	—	March 15, 2007	Mount Lemmon	Mount Lemmon Survey	·	2.0 km	MPC · JPL
519884	2013 OR_{12}	—	July 16, 2013	Haleakala	Pan-STARRS 1	·	2.4 km	MPC · JPL
519885	2013 OT_{12}	—	October 27, 2009	Mount Lemmon	Mount Lemmon Survey	·	1.4 km	MPC · JPL
519886	2013 OV_{12}	—	July 16, 2013	Haleakala	Pan-STARRS 1	EUN	1.0 km	MPC · JPL
519887	2013 OW_{12}	—	May 21, 2006	Kitt Peak	Spacewatch	HYG	2.8 km	MPC · JPL
519888	2013 OY_{12}	—	July 18, 2013	Haleakala	Pan-STARRS 1	·	2.6 km	MPC · JPL
519889	2013 OZ_{12}	—	September 13, 2007	Anderson Mesa	LONEOS	THM	2.6 km	MPC · JPL
519890	2013 OA_{13}	—	December 17, 2003	Kitt Peak	Spacewatch	·	2.4 km	MPC · JPL
519891	2013 OB_{13}	—	January 17, 2007	Kitt Peak	Spacewatch	·	1.4 km	MPC · JPL
519892	2013 OC_{13}	—	July 20, 2013	Haleakala	Pan-STARRS 1	·	1.3 km	MPC · JPL
519893	2013 OF_{13}	—	April 11, 2007	Mount Lemmon	Mount Lemmon Survey	KOR	1.5 km	MPC · JPL
519894	2013 PQ_{20}	—	August 8, 2013	Haleakala	Pan-STARRS 1	H	410 m	MPC · JPL
519895	2013 PK_{79}	—	September 28, 2008	Catalina	CSS	·	2.8 km	MPC · JPL
519896	2013 PX_{79}	—	February 10, 2008	Mount Lemmon	Mount Lemmon Survey	·	1.5 km	MPC · JPL
519897	2013 PE_{80}	—	March 14, 2012	Mount Lemmon	Mount Lemmon Survey	·	910 m	MPC · JPL
519898	2013 PF_{80}	—	July 30, 2008	Kitt Peak	Spacewatch	·	2.3 km	MPC · JPL
519899	2013 PG_{80}	—	February 4, 2005	Kitt Peak	Spacewatch	EOS	1.8 km	MPC · JPL
519900	2013 PK_{80}	—	February 26, 2012	Mount Lemmon	Mount Lemmon Survey	·	1.8 km	MPC · JPL

== 519901–520000 ==
back to top

Designation			Discovery			Properties		Ref
Permanent	Provisional	Named after	Date	Site	Discoverer(s)	Category	Diam.	Ref
519901	2013 PL_{80}	—	April 25, 2006	Kitt Peak	Spacewatch	THM	2.3 km	MPC · JPL
519902	2013 PN_{80}	—	October 17, 2010	Mount Lemmon	Mount Lemmon Survey	·	810 m	MPC · JPL
519903	2013 PR_{80}	—	April 6, 2008	Kitt Peak	Spacewatch	·	1.1 km	MPC · JPL
519904	2013 PU_{80}	—	March 20, 2007	Kitt Peak	Spacewatch	AGN	1.1 km	MPC · JPL
519905	2013 PZ_{81}	—	August 14, 2013	Haleakala	Pan-STARRS 1	·	1.0 km	MPC · JPL
519906	2013 PF_{82}	—	October 14, 2009	Mount Lemmon	Mount Lemmon Survey	·	1.2 km	MPC · JPL
519907	2013 PO_{82}	—	September 5, 2008	Kitt Peak	Spacewatch	·	2.7 km	MPC · JPL
519908	2013 QS_{51}	—	March 14, 2011	Mount Lemmon	Mount Lemmon Survey	EOS	1.5 km	MPC · JPL
519909	2013 QM_{64}	—	August 8, 2013	Haleakala	Pan-STARRS 1	PHO	1.0 km	MPC · JPL
519910	2013 QA_{96}	—	September 15, 2009	Kitt Peak	Spacewatch	·	1.5 km	MPC · JPL
519911	2013 QD_{96}	—	October 1, 2005	Catalina	CSS	·	1.2 km	MPC · JPL
519912	2013 QH_{96}	—	January 4, 2011	Mount Lemmon	Mount Lemmon Survey	·	950 m	MPC · JPL
519913	2013 QJ_{96}	—	August 28, 2006	Kitt Peak	Spacewatch	V	620 m	MPC · JPL
519914	2013 RL_{1}	—	August 15, 2013	Haleakala	Pan-STARRS 1	H	320 m	MPC · JPL
519915	2013 RD_{104}	—	October 8, 2004	Kitt Peak	Spacewatch	AGN	1.2 km	MPC · JPL
519916	2013 RE_{104}	—	September 1, 2013	Mount Lemmon	Mount Lemmon Survey	V	520 m	MPC · JPL
519917	2013 RG_{104}	—	October 13, 2009	La Sagra	OAM	EUN	1.1 km	MPC · JPL
519918	2013 RJ_{104}	—	March 5, 2011	Mount Lemmon	Mount Lemmon Survey	·	2.8 km	MPC · JPL
519919	2013 RN_{104}	—	January 2, 2011	Mount Lemmon	Mount Lemmon Survey	V	530 m	MPC · JPL
519920	2013 RP_{104}	—	January 16, 2011	Mount Lemmon	Mount Lemmon Survey	·	980 m	MPC · JPL
519921	2013 RX_{104}	—	March 26, 2007	Kitt Peak	Spacewatch	·	1.6 km	MPC · JPL
519922	2013 RY_{104}	—	September 5, 2013	Kitt Peak	Spacewatch	·	1.4 km	MPC · JPL
519923	2013 RZ_{104}	—	September 6, 2013	Kitt Peak	Spacewatch	·	2.0 km	MPC · JPL
519924	2013 RA_{105}	—	August 22, 2004	Kitt Peak	Spacewatch	·	1.3 km	MPC · JPL
519925	2013 RB_{105}	—	September 4, 2007	Mount Lemmon	Mount Lemmon Survey	·	2.3 km	MPC · JPL
519926	2013 RC_{105}	—	September 6, 2013	Kitt Peak	Spacewatch	MAR	800 m	MPC · JPL
519927	2013 RD_{105}	—	September 6, 2013	Kitt Peak	Spacewatch	AGN	1.0 km	MPC · JPL
519928	2013 RE_{105}	—	September 6, 2013	Kitt Peak	Spacewatch	(5)	1.2 km	MPC · JPL
519929	2013 RF_{105}	—	October 11, 2004	Kitt Peak	Spacewatch	AST	1.7 km	MPC · JPL
519930	2013 RS_{105}	—	November 14, 2006	Mount Lemmon	Mount Lemmon Survey	NYS	950 m	MPC · JPL
519931	2013 RT_{105}	—	September 2, 2013	Catalina	CSS	·	1.2 km	MPC · JPL
519932	2013 RW_{105}	—	September 12, 2013	Mount Lemmon	Mount Lemmon Survey	·	1.4 km	MPC · JPL
519933	2013 RY_{105}	—	January 9, 2006	Kitt Peak	Spacewatch	·	1.5 km	MPC · JPL
519934	2013 RZ_{105}	—	March 27, 2012	Kitt Peak	Spacewatch	·	2.1 km	MPC · JPL
519935	2013 RB_{106}	—	October 15, 2004	Kitt Peak	Spacewatch	·	2.2 km	MPC · JPL
519936	2013 RC_{106}	—	September 1, 2013	Mount Lemmon	Mount Lemmon Survey	·	540 m	MPC · JPL
519937	2013 RE_{106}	—	September 13, 2013	Mount Lemmon	Mount Lemmon Survey	·	1.7 km	MPC · JPL
519938	2013 RF_{106}	—	September 13, 2013	Mount Lemmon	Mount Lemmon Survey	·	1.2 km	MPC · JPL
519939	2013 RO_{106}	—	August 21, 2004	Kitt Peak	Spacewatch	·	1.0 km	MPC · JPL
519940	2013 RP_{106}	—	September 14, 2013	Mount Lemmon	Mount Lemmon Survey	·	1.4 km	MPC · JPL
519941	2013 RR_{106}	—	October 2, 2008	Kitt Peak	Spacewatch	·	1.7 km	MPC · JPL
519942	2013 RS_{106}	—	September 14, 2013	Mount Lemmon	Mount Lemmon Survey	·	1.5 km	MPC · JPL
519943	2013 RU_{106}	—	September 14, 2013	Haleakala	Pan-STARRS 1	EUN	900 m	MPC · JPL
519944	2013 RV_{106}	—	September 14, 2013	Haleakala	Pan-STARRS 1	RAF	720 m	MPC · JPL
519945	2013 RA_{107}	—	December 1, 2006	Mount Lemmon	Mount Lemmon Survey	·	1.1 km	MPC · JPL
519946	2013 RC_{107}	—	September 13, 2013	Catalina	CSS	EUN	1.2 km	MPC · JPL
519947	2013 RO_{107}	—	November 7, 2007	Kitt Peak	Spacewatch	CYB	3.5 km	MPC · JPL
519948	2013 RS_{107}	—	September 11, 2004	Kitt Peak	Spacewatch	·	1.1 km	MPC · JPL
519949	2013 SJ_{4}	—	September 17, 2013	Mount Lemmon	Mount Lemmon Survey	PHO	880 m	MPC · JPL
519950	2013 SQ_{6}	—	September 14, 2007	Kitt Peak	Spacewatch	VER	2.3 km	MPC · JPL
519951	2013 SC_{9}	—	February 12, 2011	Mount Lemmon	Mount Lemmon Survey	·	2.7 km	MPC · JPL
519952	2013 SL_{13}	—	February 17, 2010	Kitt Peak	Spacewatch	·	2.8 km	MPC · JPL
519953	2013 SB_{85}	—	March 16, 2012	Haleakala	Pan-STARRS 1	·	1.2 km	MPC · JPL
519954	2013 SQ_{101}	—	September 17, 2013	Mount Lemmon	Mount Lemmon Survey	JUN	1.0 km	MPC · JPL
519955	2013 SR_{101}	—	September 17, 2013	Mount Lemmon	Mount Lemmon Survey	·	2.9 km	MPC · JPL
519956	2013 SV_{101}	—	November 18, 2008	Kitt Peak	Spacewatch	·	1.9 km	MPC · JPL
519957	2013 SX_{101}	—	September 28, 2013	Mount Lemmon	Mount Lemmon Survey	·	1.3 km	MPC · JPL
519958	2013 SY_{101}	—	September 28, 2013	Mount Lemmon	Mount Lemmon Survey	·	1.5 km	MPC · JPL
519959	2013 SZ_{101}	—	September 15, 2013	Catalina	CSS	EUN	1.2 km	MPC · JPL
519960	2013 TH_{45}	—	October 24, 2008	Kitt Peak	Spacewatch	·	1.9 km	MPC · JPL
519961	2013 TT_{84}	—	February 26, 2011	Mount Lemmon	Mount Lemmon Survey	·	1.7 km	MPC · JPL
519962	2013 TH_{127}	—	October 7, 2013	Mount Lemmon	Mount Lemmon Survey	H	350 m	MPC · JPL
519963	2013 TG_{155}	—	April 6, 2008	Kitt Peak	Spacewatch	·	910 m	MPC · JPL
519964	2013 TL_{159}	—	January 23, 2011	Mount Lemmon	Mount Lemmon Survey	V	650 m	MPC · JPL
519965	2013 TH_{165}	—	January 30, 2006	Kitt Peak	Spacewatch	·	2.0 km	MPC · JPL
519966	2013 TL_{165}	—	November 26, 2009	Kitt Peak	Spacewatch	·	1.1 km	MPC · JPL
519967	2013 TQ_{165}	—	March 13, 2007	Kitt Peak	Spacewatch	·	1.3 km	MPC · JPL
519968	2013 TU_{165}	—	October 2, 2013	Kitt Peak	Spacewatch	·	1.7 km	MPC · JPL
519969	2013 TC_{166}	—	March 29, 2012	Mount Lemmon	Mount Lemmon Survey	EUN	860 m	MPC · JPL
519970	2013 TH_{166}	—	September 3, 2013	Kitt Peak	Spacewatch	URS	3.2 km	MPC · JPL
519971	2013 TK_{166}	—	October 2, 2013	Kitt Peak	Spacewatch	·	2.0 km	MPC · JPL
519972	2013 TU_{166}	—	October 3, 2013	Kitt Peak	Spacewatch	·	1.7 km	MPC · JPL
519973	2013 TY_{166}	—	October 2, 2006	Mount Lemmon	Mount Lemmon Survey	V	390 m	MPC · JPL
519974	2013 TZ_{166}	—	September 7, 2008	Mount Lemmon	Mount Lemmon Survey	·	1.5 km	MPC · JPL
519975	2013 TA_{167}	—	October 3, 2013	Mount Lemmon	Mount Lemmon Survey	·	940 m	MPC · JPL
519976	2013 TB_{167}	—	October 13, 2005	Kitt Peak	Spacewatch	·	670 m	MPC · JPL
519977	2013 TC_{167}	—	October 3, 2013	Kitt Peak	Spacewatch	·	2.7 km	MPC · JPL
519978	2013 TD_{167}	—	September 3, 2008	Kitt Peak	Spacewatch	·	1.9 km	MPC · JPL
519979	2013 TE_{167}	—	September 7, 2008	Mount Lemmon	Mount Lemmon Survey	AGN	920 m	MPC · JPL
519980	2013 TK_{167}	—	October 3, 2013	Haleakala	Pan-STARRS 1	·	1.4 km	MPC · JPL
519981	2013 TL_{167}	—	March 13, 2011	Kitt Peak	Spacewatch	·	2.0 km	MPC · JPL
519982	2013 TQ_{167}	—	February 25, 2006	Kitt Peak	Spacewatch	·	1.4 km	MPC · JPL
519983	2013 TU_{167}	—	October 3, 2013	Haleakala	Pan-STARRS 1	·	1.6 km	MPC · JPL
519984	2013 TY_{167}	—	October 3, 2013	Haleakala	Pan-STARRS 1	·	1.1 km	MPC · JPL
519985	2013 TB_{168}	—	September 22, 2009	Mount Lemmon	Mount Lemmon Survey	·	1.1 km	MPC · JPL
519986	2013 TE_{168}	—	October 3, 2013	Haleakala	Pan-STARRS 1	·	2.5 km	MPC · JPL
519987	2013 TM_{168}	—	May 21, 2012	Haleakala	Pan-STARRS 1	·	970 m	MPC · JPL
519988	2013 TS_{168}	—	September 26, 2013	Mount Lemmon	Mount Lemmon Survey	MAR	940 m	MPC · JPL
519989	2013 TT_{168}	—	November 11, 2004	Kitt Peak	Spacewatch	·	2.4 km	MPC · JPL
519990	2013 TU_{168}	—	October 5, 2013	Kitt Peak	Spacewatch	·	1.7 km	MPC · JPL
519991	2013 TW_{168}	—	October 26, 2005	Kitt Peak	Spacewatch	·	720 m	MPC · JPL
519992	2013 TZ_{168}	—	October 5, 2013	Kitt Peak	Spacewatch	·	1.3 km	MPC · JPL
519993	2013 TF_{169}	—	May 19, 2012	Mount Lemmon	Mount Lemmon Survey	·	1.2 km	MPC · JPL
519994	2013 TH_{169}	—	September 22, 2009	Kitt Peak	Spacewatch	·	910 m	MPC · JPL
519995	2013 TM_{169}	—	February 19, 2010	Mount Lemmon	Mount Lemmon Survey	·	1.7 km	MPC · JPL
519996	2013 TO_{169}	—	October 5, 2013	Haleakala	Pan-STARRS 1	·	1.4 km	MPC · JPL
519997	2013 TV_{169}	—	December 10, 2009	Mount Lemmon	Mount Lemmon Survey	·	1.5 km	MPC · JPL
519998	2013 TW_{169}	—	August 7, 2008	Kitt Peak	Spacewatch	·	1.7 km	MPC · JPL
519999	2013 TF_{170}	—	November 4, 2004	Kitt Peak	Spacewatch	·	1.8 km	MPC · JPL
520000	2013 TG_{170}	—	October 20, 2008	Kitt Peak	Spacewatch	·	2.5 km	MPC · JPL

back to top

== Meaning of names ==
As minor planet discoveries are confirmed, they are given a permanent number by the IAU's Minor Planet Center (MPC), and the discoverers can then submit names for them, following the IAU's naming conventions. The list below concerns those minor planets in the specified number-range that have received names, and explains the meanings of those names.

Official naming citations of newly named small Solar System bodies are approved and published in a bulletin by IAU's Working Group for Small Bodies Nomenclature (WGSBN). Before May 2021, citations were published in MPC's Minor Planet Circulars for many decades. Recent citations can also be found on the JPL Small-Body Database (SBDB). Until his death in 2016, German astronomer Lutz D. Schmadel compiled these citations into the Dictionary of Minor Planet Names (DMP) and regularly updated the collection.

Based on Paul Herget's The Names of the Minor Planets, Schmadel also researched the unclear origin of numerous asteroids, most of which had been named prior to World War II. This article incorporates text from this source, which is in the public domain: SBDB New namings may only be added to this list below after official publication as the preannouncement of names is condemned. The WGSBN publishes a comprehensive guideline for the naming rules of non-cometary small Solar System bodies.

Named minor planet	Provisional	This minor planet was named for...	Ref · Catalog
519419 Guyewang	2011 UU_{270}	Gu Yewang (519–581), originally from Suzhou, was a renowned geographer, philologist, and historian in ancient China.	IAU · 519419
