= List of minor planets: 403001–404000 =

The following is a partial list of minor planets, running from minor-planet number 403001 through 404000, inclusive. The primary data for this and other partial lists is based on JPL's "Small-Body Orbital Elements" and data available from the Minor Planet Center. Critical list information is also provided by the MPC, unless otherwise specified from Lowell Observatory. A detailed description of the table's columns and additional sources are given on the main page including a complete list of every page in this series, and a statistical break-up on the dynamical classification of minor planets.

Also see the summary list of all named bodies in numerical and alphabetical order, and the corresponding naming citations for the number range of this particular list. New namings may only be added to this list after official publication, as the preannouncement of names is condemned by the Working Group for Small Bodies Nomenclature of the International Astronomical Union.

Near-Earth obj.	MBA (inner)	MBA (outer)	Centaur
Mars-crosser	MBA (middle)	Jupiter trojan	Trans-Neptunian obj.
Unclassified

== 403001–403100 ==
Designation			Discovery			Properties		Ref
Permanent	Provisional	Named after	Date	Site	Discoverer(s)	Category	Diam.	Ref
403001	2007 VE_{266}	—	November 2, 2007	Kitt Peak	Spacewatch	NYS	1.4 km	MPC · JPL
403002	2007 VE_{270}	—	November 15, 2007	Socorro	LINEAR	·	1.1 km	MPC · JPL
403003	2007 VG_{270}	—	November 15, 2007	Socorro	LINEAR	·	1.3 km	MPC · JPL
403004	2007 VV_{276}	—	November 14, 2007	Kitt Peak	Spacewatch	·	1.2 km	MPC · JPL
403005	2007 VP_{283}	—	November 14, 2007	Kitt Peak	Spacewatch	NYS	1.4 km	MPC · JPL
403006	2007 VD_{288}	—	November 12, 2007	Mount Lemmon	Mount Lemmon Survey	·	1.3 km	MPC · JPL
403007	2007 VA_{291}	—	October 2, 2003	Kitt Peak	Spacewatch	·	1.3 km	MPC · JPL
403008	2007 VH_{298}	—	November 2, 2007	Catalina	CSS	JUN	1.2 km	MPC · JPL
403009	2007 VP_{305}	—	November 1, 2007	Kitt Peak	Spacewatch	·	1.2 km	MPC · JPL
403010	2007 VS_{312}	—	November 2, 2007	Kitt Peak	Spacewatch	·	1.2 km	MPC · JPL
403011	2007 VE_{328}	—	November 8, 2007	Kitt Peak	Spacewatch	3:2	5.3 km	MPC · JPL
403012	2007 VD_{332}	—	November 7, 2007	Kitt Peak	Spacewatch	·	1.7 km	MPC · JPL
403013	2007 VX_{332}	—	November 9, 2007	Socorro	LINEAR	V	650 m	MPC · JPL
403014	2007 VH_{333}	—	November 9, 2007	Mount Lemmon	Mount Lemmon Survey	·	1.1 km	MPC · JPL
403015	2007 WP_{5}	—	November 17, 2007	Socorro	LINEAR	·	1.3 km	MPC · JPL
403016	2007 WY_{7}	—	November 15, 2007	Anderson Mesa	LONEOS	·	1.1 km	MPC · JPL
403017	2007 WJ_{24}	—	November 18, 2007	Mount Lemmon	Mount Lemmon Survey	·	1.3 km	MPC · JPL
403018	2007 WY_{27}	—	November 3, 2007	Kitt Peak	Spacewatch	(5)	1.2 km	MPC · JPL
403019	2007 WY_{55}	—	September 15, 2007	Mount Lemmon	Mount Lemmon Survey	NYS	1.3 km	MPC · JPL
403020	2007 WV_{61}	—	November 17, 2007	Socorro	LINEAR	·	1.5 km	MPC · JPL
403021	2007 WZ_{62}	—	November 19, 2007	Mount Lemmon	Mount Lemmon Survey	·	1.7 km	MPC · JPL
403022	2007 XG_{3}	—	November 13, 2007	Mount Lemmon	Mount Lemmon Survey	·	1.3 km	MPC · JPL
403023	2007 XR_{5}	—	December 4, 2007	Catalina	CSS	·	1.4 km	MPC · JPL
403024	2007 XU_{16}	—	December 11, 2007	La Sagra	OAM	·	1.8 km	MPC · JPL
403025	2007 XH_{20}	—	December 13, 2007	Dauban	Chante-Perdrix	·	3.9 km	MPC · JPL
403026	2007 XL_{35}	—	December 4, 2007	Catalina	CSS	·	1.4 km	MPC · JPL
403027	2007 XE_{45}	—	December 15, 2007	Kitt Peak	Spacewatch	NYS	1.3 km	MPC · JPL
403028	2007 XE_{50}	—	November 5, 2007	Mount Lemmon	Mount Lemmon Survey	·	1.2 km	MPC · JPL
403029	2007 XK_{52}	—	December 6, 2007	Kitt Peak	Spacewatch	·	1.5 km	MPC · JPL
403030	2007 XX_{56}	—	December 4, 2007	Kitt Peak	Spacewatch	NYS	960 m	MPC · JPL
403031	2007 YG_{14}	—	December 5, 2007	Kitt Peak	Spacewatch	·	2.5 km	MPC · JPL
403032	2007 YF_{43}	—	December 15, 2007	Kitt Peak	Spacewatch	·	1.8 km	MPC · JPL
403033	2007 YK_{53}	—	December 30, 2007	Mount Lemmon	Mount Lemmon Survey	·	1.2 km	MPC · JPL
403034	2007 YU_{58}	—	November 8, 2007	Mount Lemmon	Mount Lemmon Survey	·	2.6 km	MPC · JPL
403035	2007 YB_{59}	—	December 20, 2007	Kitt Peak	Spacewatch	H	620 m	MPC · JPL
403036	2007 YN_{62}	—	December 30, 2007	Kitt Peak	Spacewatch	(5)	990 m	MPC · JPL
403037	2007 YX_{67}	—	December 19, 2007	Mount Lemmon	Mount Lemmon Survey	RAF	960 m	MPC · JPL
403038	2007 YG_{68}	—	December 31, 2007	Kitt Peak	Spacewatch	·	1.4 km	MPC · JPL
403039	2008 AE	—	January 1, 2008	Catalina	CSS	AMO	380 m	MPC · JPL
403040	2008 AZ_{4}	—	December 30, 2007	Kitt Peak	Spacewatch	(5)	1.1 km	MPC · JPL
403041	2008 AC_{5}	—	January 7, 2008	Lulin	LUSS	(5)	1.5 km	MPC · JPL
403042	2008 AC_{14}	—	January 10, 2008	Mount Lemmon	Mount Lemmon Survey	·	2.2 km	MPC · JPL
403043	2008 AZ_{18}	—	January 10, 2008	Mount Lemmon	Mount Lemmon Survey	NYS	1.2 km	MPC · JPL
403044	2008 AO_{26}	—	January 10, 2008	Catalina	CSS	(10369)	3.1 km	MPC · JPL
403045	2008 AD_{29}	—	January 1, 2008	7300	W. K. Y. Yeung	EUN	1.2 km	MPC · JPL
403046	2008 AU_{30}	—	December 30, 2007	Kitt Peak	Spacewatch	DOR	2.2 km	MPC · JPL
403047	2008 AB_{32}	—	January 14, 2008	Piszkéstető	K. Sárneczky	·	2.0 km	MPC · JPL
403048	2008 AR_{35}	—	January 10, 2008	Kitt Peak	Spacewatch	·	1.0 km	MPC · JPL
403049	2008 AY_{36}	—	January 10, 2008	Catalina	CSS	·	1.0 km	MPC · JPL
403050	2008 AC_{67}	—	January 11, 2008	Kitt Peak	Spacewatch	·	1.6 km	MPC · JPL
403051	2008 AC_{71}	—	November 19, 2007	Mount Lemmon	Mount Lemmon Survey	(5)	1.2 km	MPC · JPL
403052	2008 AP_{76}	—	January 12, 2008	Kitt Peak	Spacewatch	·	1.9 km	MPC · JPL
403053	2008 AJ_{77}	—	January 12, 2008	Kitt Peak	Spacewatch	·	1.0 km	MPC · JPL
403054	2008 AN_{78}	—	November 13, 2007	Mount Lemmon	Mount Lemmon Survey	ADE	2.1 km	MPC · JPL
403055	2008 AR_{84}	—	January 12, 2008	La Sagra	OAM	·	1.6 km	MPC · JPL
403056	2008 AV_{91}	—	January 14, 2008	Kitt Peak	Spacewatch	·	2.1 km	MPC · JPL
403057	2008 AZ_{107}	—	December 30, 2007	Kitt Peak	Spacewatch	·	1.3 km	MPC · JPL
403058	2008 AZ_{114}	—	January 11, 2008	Kitt Peak	Spacewatch	·	1.4 km	MPC · JPL
403059	2008 AO_{115}	—	January 10, 2008	Mount Lemmon	Mount Lemmon Survey	(5)	1.1 km	MPC · JPL
403060	2008 AW_{137}	—	July 22, 2006	Mount Lemmon	Mount Lemmon Survey	·	1.1 km	MPC · JPL
403061	2008 BR_{5}	—	December 30, 2007	Kitt Peak	Spacewatch	·	1.0 km	MPC · JPL
403062	2008 BB_{20}	—	January 30, 2008	Kitt Peak	Spacewatch	·	2.6 km	MPC · JPL
403063	2008 BZ_{21}	—	January 30, 2008	Kitt Peak	Spacewatch	·	1.8 km	MPC · JPL
403064	2008 BZ_{33}	—	January 30, 2008	Kitt Peak	Spacewatch	·	2.2 km	MPC · JPL
403065	2008 BN_{34}	—	January 30, 2008	Kitt Peak	Spacewatch	·	1.5 km	MPC · JPL
403066	2008 BD_{40}	—	December 18, 2007	Mount Lemmon	Mount Lemmon Survey	H	640 m	MPC · JPL
403067	2008 BF_{42}	—	October 20, 2007	Kitt Peak	Spacewatch	·	2.3 km	MPC · JPL
403068	2008 BL_{42}	—	January 31, 2008	Catalina	CSS	·	1.8 km	MPC · JPL
403069	2008 BU_{42}	—	December 31, 2007	Mount Lemmon	Mount Lemmon Survey	·	2.2 km	MPC · JPL
403070	2008 BW_{42}	—	January 31, 2008	Lulin	LUSS	HNS	1.3 km	MPC · JPL
403071	2008 BV_{47}	—	January 30, 2008	Kitt Peak	Spacewatch	·	1.8 km	MPC · JPL
403072	2008 BV_{51}	—	January 18, 2008	Mount Lemmon	Mount Lemmon Survey	·	1.6 km	MPC · JPL
403073	2008 BV_{53}	—	January 30, 2008	Mount Lemmon	Mount Lemmon Survey	·	1.6 km	MPC · JPL
403074	2008 CZ_{2}	—	February 1, 2008	Mount Lemmon	Mount Lemmon Survey	·	2.0 km	MPC · JPL
403075	2008 CD_{3}	—	February 1, 2008	Mount Lemmon	Mount Lemmon Survey	GAL	1.6 km	MPC · JPL
403076	2008 CV_{12}	—	February 3, 2008	Kitt Peak	Spacewatch	H	570 m	MPC · JPL
403077	2008 CW_{12}	—	November 20, 2007	Mount Lemmon	Mount Lemmon Survey	·	1.5 km	MPC · JPL
403078	2008 CP_{13}	—	February 3, 2008	Kitt Peak	Spacewatch	·	2.7 km	MPC · JPL
403079	2008 CF_{18}	—	February 3, 2008	Catalina	CSS	H	620 m	MPC · JPL
403080	2008 CJ_{19}	—	November 9, 2007	Mount Lemmon	Mount Lemmon Survey	·	1.8 km	MPC · JPL
403081	2008 CU_{19}	—	February 6, 2008	Catalina	CSS	·	1.9 km	MPC · JPL
403082	2008 CV_{20}	—	October 19, 2007	Mount Lemmon	Mount Lemmon Survey	·	1.5 km	MPC · JPL
403083	2008 CA_{23}	—	September 14, 2006	Kitt Peak	Spacewatch	·	1.6 km	MPC · JPL
403084	2008 CK_{34}	—	February 2, 2008	Kitt Peak	Spacewatch	·	1.4 km	MPC · JPL
403085	2008 CK_{37}	—	February 2, 2008	Kitt Peak	Spacewatch	·	1.6 km	MPC · JPL
403086	2008 CW_{43}	—	January 11, 2008	Mount Lemmon	Mount Lemmon Survey	·	2.2 km	MPC · JPL
403087	2008 CB_{44}	—	February 2, 2008	Kitt Peak	Spacewatch	·	1.8 km	MPC · JPL
403088	2008 CC_{46}	—	February 2, 2008	Kitt Peak	Spacewatch	·	2.0 km	MPC · JPL
403089	2008 CB_{61}	—	February 7, 2008	Mount Lemmon	Mount Lemmon Survey	·	2.2 km	MPC · JPL
403090	2008 CX_{67}	—	February 8, 2008	Mount Lemmon	Mount Lemmon Survey	AGN	1.3 km	MPC · JPL
403091	2008 CX_{72}	—	February 7, 2008	Catalina	CSS	HNS	1.2 km	MPC · JPL
403092	2008 CA_{73}	—	February 10, 2008	Socorro	LINEAR	H	640 m	MPC · JPL
403093	2008 CO_{84}	—	October 23, 2006	Palomar	NEAT	HNS	1.3 km	MPC · JPL
403094	2008 CY_{87}	—	February 7, 2008	Mount Lemmon	Mount Lemmon Survey	·	1.4 km	MPC · JPL
403095	2008 CJ_{95}	—	November 14, 2007	Mount Lemmon	Mount Lemmon Survey	·	1.7 km	MPC · JPL
403096	2008 CQ_{107}	—	February 2, 2008	Kitt Peak	Spacewatch	·	1.4 km	MPC · JPL
403097	2008 CN_{119}	—	February 11, 2008	Dauban	Kugel, F.	·	2.0 km	MPC · JPL
403098	2008 CW_{122}	—	February 7, 2008	Mount Lemmon	Mount Lemmon Survey	·	1.3 km	MPC · JPL
403099	2008 CQ_{126}	—	February 8, 2008	Kitt Peak	Spacewatch	·	1.7 km	MPC · JPL
403100	2008 CP_{137}	—	February 8, 2008	Kitt Peak	Spacewatch	·	1.6 km	MPC · JPL

== 403101–403200 ==
back to top

Designation			Discovery			Properties		Ref
Permanent	Provisional	Named after	Date	Site	Discoverer(s)	Category	Diam.	Ref
403101	2008 CK_{138}	—	February 1, 2008	Kitt Peak	Spacewatch	DOR	2.1 km	MPC · JPL
403102	2008 CU_{148}	—	January 15, 2008	Mount Lemmon	Mount Lemmon Survey	·	1.2 km	MPC · JPL
403103	2008 CS_{151}	—	February 9, 2008	Kitt Peak	Spacewatch	·	1.2 km	MPC · JPL
403104	2008 CR_{152}	—	February 9, 2008	Kitt Peak	Spacewatch	HNS	1.3 km	MPC · JPL
403105	2008 CJ_{158}	—	February 9, 2008	Kitt Peak	Spacewatch	·	2.0 km	MPC · JPL
403106	2008 CO_{159}	—	February 9, 2008	Kitt Peak	Spacewatch	(5)	970 m	MPC · JPL
403107	2008 CC_{160}	—	February 9, 2008	Kitt Peak	Spacewatch	·	1.1 km	MPC · JPL
403108	2008 CJ_{160}	—	February 9, 2008	Kitt Peak	Spacewatch	·	1.7 km	MPC · JPL
403109	2008 CH_{181}	—	February 10, 2008	Anderson Mesa	LONEOS	·	1.8 km	MPC · JPL
403110	2008 CU_{185}	—	January 20, 2008	Mount Lemmon	Mount Lemmon Survey	·	1.8 km	MPC · JPL
403111	2008 CV_{187}	—	November 20, 2007	Mount Lemmon	Mount Lemmon Survey	·	2.8 km	MPC · JPL
403112	2008 CG_{189}	—	January 10, 2008	Catalina	CSS	·	1.9 km	MPC · JPL
403113	2008 CK_{195}	—	February 13, 2008	Mount Lemmon	Mount Lemmon Survey	·	2.1 km	MPC · JPL
403114	2008 CV_{201}	—	February 8, 2008	Mount Lemmon	Mount Lemmon Survey	·	2.1 km	MPC · JPL
403115	2008 CM_{209}	—	February 3, 2008	Catalina	CSS	·	1.7 km	MPC · JPL
403116	2008 DO_{2}	—	January 18, 2008	Kitt Peak	Spacewatch	·	2.0 km	MPC · JPL
403117	2008 DT_{7}	—	February 24, 2008	Mount Lemmon	Mount Lemmon Survey	·	1.7 km	MPC · JPL
403118	2008 DB_{12}	—	January 10, 2008	Mount Lemmon	Mount Lemmon Survey	·	1.2 km	MPC · JPL
403119	2008 DV_{14}	—	February 26, 2008	Mount Lemmon	Mount Lemmon Survey	·	3.3 km	MPC · JPL
403120	2008 DC_{16}	—	February 27, 2008	Catalina	CSS	·	2.0 km	MPC · JPL
403121	2008 DX_{16}	—	December 15, 2007	Catalina	CSS	·	2.3 km	MPC · JPL
403122	2008 DJ_{38}	—	February 27, 2008	Kitt Peak	Spacewatch	·	2.0 km	MPC · JPL
403123	2008 DA_{53}	—	February 10, 2008	Mount Lemmon	Mount Lemmon Survey	·	1.7 km	MPC · JPL
403124	2008 DV_{56}	—	February 29, 2008	Catalina	CSS	·	2.4 km	MPC · JPL
403125	2008 DZ_{64}	—	February 10, 2008	Mount Lemmon	Mount Lemmon Survey	WIT	800 m	MPC · JPL
403126	2008 DO_{76}	—	February 28, 2008	Mount Lemmon	Mount Lemmon Survey	·	1.8 km	MPC · JPL
403127	2008 DK_{84}	—	February 28, 2008	Mount Lemmon	Mount Lemmon Survey	·	2.3 km	MPC · JPL
403128	2008 DD_{87}	—	February 27, 2008	Mount Lemmon	Mount Lemmon Survey	·	1.8 km	MPC · JPL
403129	2008 EC_{9}	—	March 8, 2008	Catalina	CSS	H	480 m	MPC · JPL
403130	2008 EK_{9}	—	March 9, 2008	Socorro	LINEAR	H	560 m	MPC · JPL
403131	2008 EY_{18}	—	February 24, 2008	Kitt Peak	Spacewatch	·	1.9 km	MPC · JPL
403132	2008 EU_{20}	—	March 2, 2008	Kitt Peak	Spacewatch	·	2.1 km	MPC · JPL
403133	2008 EC_{39}	—	March 4, 2008	Kitt Peak	Spacewatch	·	1.7 km	MPC · JPL
403134	2008 ED_{47}	—	March 5, 2008	Mount Lemmon	Mount Lemmon Survey	·	1.9 km	MPC · JPL
403135	2008 EX_{69}	—	March 4, 2008	Mount Lemmon	Mount Lemmon Survey	·	1.7 km	MPC · JPL
403136	2008 EL_{74}	—	February 28, 2008	Kitt Peak	Spacewatch	AGN	1.3 km	MPC · JPL
403137	2008 EX_{74}	—	March 7, 2008	Kitt Peak	Spacewatch	URS	5.5 km	MPC · JPL
403138	2008 EZ_{74}	—	March 7, 2008	Kitt Peak	Spacewatch	·	1.9 km	MPC · JPL
403139	2008 EH_{96}	—	March 6, 2008	Mount Lemmon	Mount Lemmon Survey	·	2.3 km	MPC · JPL
403140	2008 EV_{103}	—	March 5, 2008	Mount Lemmon	Mount Lemmon Survey	·	1.6 km	MPC · JPL
403141	2008 EG_{124}	—	March 10, 2008	Kitt Peak	Spacewatch	·	1.8 km	MPC · JPL
403142	2008 EN_{135}	—	March 11, 2008	Kitt Peak	Spacewatch	AGN	1.1 km	MPC · JPL
403143	2008 EU_{141}	—	February 12, 2008	Mount Lemmon	Mount Lemmon Survey	·	1.9 km	MPC · JPL
403144	2008 ED_{162}	—	March 11, 2008	Mount Lemmon	Mount Lemmon Survey	L5	8.0 km	MPC · JPL
403145	2008 ES_{162}	—	September 30, 2005	Mount Lemmon	Mount Lemmon Survey	KOR	1.3 km	MPC · JPL
403146	2008 FD	—	November 17, 2007	Kitt Peak	Spacewatch	·	2.8 km	MPC · JPL
403147	2008 FS_{9}	—	September 30, 2005	Mount Lemmon	Mount Lemmon Survey	·	2.0 km	MPC · JPL
403148	2008 FV_{20}	—	March 27, 2008	Kitt Peak	Spacewatch	·	1.5 km	MPC · JPL
403149	2008 FZ_{27}	—	March 27, 2008	Kitt Peak	Spacewatch	·	2.3 km	MPC · JPL
403150	2008 FP_{37}	—	March 28, 2008	Kitt Peak	Spacewatch	·	1.6 km	MPC · JPL
403151	2008 FF_{45}	—	February 26, 2008	Mount Lemmon	Mount Lemmon Survey	·	1.9 km	MPC · JPL
403152	2008 FQ_{72}	—	March 30, 2008	Kitt Peak	Spacewatch	·	2.4 km	MPC · JPL
403153	2008 FU_{89}	—	March 29, 2008	Mount Lemmon	Mount Lemmon Survey	·	2.0 km	MPC · JPL
403154	2008 FG_{94}	—	March 29, 2008	Kitt Peak	Spacewatch	·	2.8 km	MPC · JPL
403155	2008 FK_{97}	—	March 30, 2008	Kitt Peak	Spacewatch	HOF	2.7 km	MPC · JPL
403156	2008 FR_{101}	—	March 30, 2008	Kitt Peak	Spacewatch	·	2.2 km	MPC · JPL
403157	2008 FT_{102}	—	March 30, 2008	Kitt Peak	Spacewatch	·	2.4 km	MPC · JPL
403158	2008 FL_{113}	—	March 31, 2008	Kitt Peak	Spacewatch	KOR	1.3 km	MPC · JPL
403159	2008 FY_{116}	—	March 31, 2008	Kitt Peak	Spacewatch	·	2.2 km	MPC · JPL
403160	2008 FU_{122}	—	March 27, 2008	Kitt Peak	Spacewatch	·	1.5 km	MPC · JPL
403161	2008 FQ_{125}	—	March 31, 2008	Mount Lemmon	Mount Lemmon Survey	·	2.9 km	MPC · JPL
403162	2008 FK_{129}	—	March 30, 2008	Kitt Peak	Spacewatch	·	1.9 km	MPC · JPL
403163	2008 FO_{135}	—	March 31, 2008	Mount Lemmon	Mount Lemmon Survey	·	2.4 km	MPC · JPL
403164	2008 FH_{136}	—	March 27, 2008	Mount Lemmon	Mount Lemmon Survey	·	1.4 km	MPC · JPL
403165	2008 GQ_{58}	—	April 5, 2008	Mount Lemmon	Mount Lemmon Survey	KOR	1.3 km	MPC · JPL
403166	2008 GF_{91}	—	April 6, 2008	Mount Lemmon	Mount Lemmon Survey	·	2.4 km	MPC · JPL
403167	2008 GX_{99}	—	March 28, 2008	Kitt Peak	Spacewatch	EOS	2.0 km	MPC · JPL
403168	2008 GO_{102}	—	April 10, 2008	Kitt Peak	Spacewatch	·	2.7 km	MPC · JPL
403169	2008 GU_{103}	—	April 11, 2008	Kitt Peak	Spacewatch	·	3.1 km	MPC · JPL
403170	2008 GP_{123}	—	April 13, 2008	Mount Lemmon	Mount Lemmon Survey	(5)	1.7 km	MPC · JPL
403171	2008 GG_{126}	—	April 14, 2008	Mount Lemmon	Mount Lemmon Survey	·	1.8 km	MPC · JPL
403172	2008 GO_{129}	—	April 3, 2008	Kitt Peak	Spacewatch	·	2.2 km	MPC · JPL
403173	2008 GK_{139}	—	August 30, 2005	Kitt Peak	Spacewatch	·	2.1 km	MPC · JPL
403174	2008 GT_{144}	—	April 4, 2008	Mount Lemmon	Mount Lemmon Survey	·	2.0 km	MPC · JPL
403175	2008 GF_{146}	—	April 14, 2008	Mount Lemmon	Mount Lemmon Survey	·	3.2 km	MPC · JPL
403176	2008 HR	—	April 24, 2008	Mount Lemmon	Mount Lemmon Survey	·	2.5 km	MPC · JPL
403177	2008 HH_{4}	—	April 1, 2008	Kitt Peak	Spacewatch	EOS	1.8 km	MPC · JPL
403178	2008 HE_{19}	—	September 26, 2005	Kitt Peak	Spacewatch	KOR	1.4 km	MPC · JPL
403179	2008 HT_{20}	—	April 14, 2008	Mount Lemmon	Mount Lemmon Survey	·	1.3 km	MPC · JPL
403180	2008 HW_{54}	—	April 29, 2008	Kitt Peak	Spacewatch	·	1.7 km	MPC · JPL
403181	2008 HM_{58}	—	April 30, 2008	Mount Lemmon	Mount Lemmon Survey	·	1.4 km	MPC · JPL
403182	2008 HY_{64}	—	April 30, 2008	Kitt Peak	Spacewatch	·	2.9 km	MPC · JPL
403183	2008 JS_{7}	—	April 26, 2008	Mount Lemmon	Mount Lemmon Survey	·	2.2 km	MPC · JPL
403184	2008 JP_{16}	—	May 3, 2008	Mount Lemmon	Mount Lemmon Survey	·	2.7 km	MPC · JPL
403185	2008 JC_{22}	—	May 6, 2008	Kitt Peak	Spacewatch	·	1.9 km	MPC · JPL
403186	2008 JG_{35}	—	May 3, 2008	Catalina	CSS	·	2.9 km	MPC · JPL
403187	2008 JC_{36}	—	May 3, 2008	Mount Lemmon	Mount Lemmon Survey	·	2.1 km	MPC · JPL
403188	2008 JV_{36}	—	May 7, 2008	Kitt Peak	Spacewatch	·	1.9 km	MPC · JPL
403189	2008 KN_{22}	—	May 28, 2008	Kitt Peak	Spacewatch	·	2.2 km	MPC · JPL
403190	2008 KO_{31}	—	April 6, 2008	Mount Lemmon	Mount Lemmon Survey	EOS	2.0 km	MPC · JPL
403191	2008 KN_{33}	—	May 29, 2008	Mount Lemmon	Mount Lemmon Survey	·	3.3 km	MPC · JPL
403192	2008 KM_{39}	—	May 30, 2008	Kitt Peak	Spacewatch	·	2.3 km	MPC · JPL
403193	2008 KX_{40}	—	May 13, 2008	Mount Lemmon	Mount Lemmon Survey	·	3.2 km	MPC · JPL
403194	2008 LF_{4}	—	June 2, 2008	Kitt Peak	Spacewatch	·	2.3 km	MPC · JPL
403195	2008 LN_{12}	—	June 10, 2008	Magdalena Ridge	Ryan, W. H.	HYG	2.1 km	MPC · JPL
403196	2008 PL_{9}	—	June 8, 2007	Kitt Peak	Spacewatch	CYB	5.7 km	MPC · JPL
403197	2008 QS_{21}	—	August 26, 2008	Socorro	LINEAR	·	5.5 km	MPC · JPL
403198	2008 RV_{24}	—	September 6, 2008	Catalina	CSS	·	2.0 km	MPC · JPL
403199	2008 RC_{56}	—	September 3, 2008	Kitt Peak	Spacewatch	CYB	5.1 km	MPC · JPL
403200	2008 SL_{59}	—	September 20, 2008	Kitt Peak	Spacewatch	3:2 · SHU	5.3 km	MPC · JPL

== 403201–403300 ==
back to top

Designation			Discovery			Properties		Ref
Permanent	Provisional	Named after	Date	Site	Discoverer(s)	Category	Diam.	Ref
403201	2008 SY_{68}	—	September 22, 2008	Kitt Peak	Spacewatch	HYG	2.4 km	MPC · JPL
403202	2008 SS_{91}	—	September 21, 2008	Kitt Peak	Spacewatch	·	4.3 km	MPC · JPL
403203	2008 SP_{197}	—	September 25, 2008	Kitt Peak	Spacewatch	·	550 m	MPC · JPL
403204	2008 ST_{200}	—	September 26, 2008	Kitt Peak	Spacewatch	·	630 m	MPC · JPL
403205	2008 SC_{256}	—	September 20, 2008	Kitt Peak	Spacewatch	·	620 m	MPC · JPL
403206	2008 TA_{8}	—	October 4, 2008	La Sagra	OAM	·	980 m	MPC · JPL
403207	2008 TT_{19}	—	October 1, 2008	Mount Lemmon	Mount Lemmon Survey	·	1.2 km	MPC · JPL
403208	2008 TQ_{32}	—	October 1, 2008	Kitt Peak	Spacewatch	·	560 m	MPC · JPL
403209	2008 TW_{52}	—	March 26, 2003	Kitt Peak	Spacewatch	·	1.3 km	MPC · JPL
403210	2008 TS_{73}	—	October 2, 2008	Kitt Peak	Spacewatch	·	580 m	MPC · JPL
403211	2008 TP_{97}	—	September 4, 2008	Kitt Peak	Spacewatch	·	510 m	MPC · JPL
403212	2008 TQ_{112}	—	September 23, 2008	Catalina	CSS	·	930 m	MPC · JPL
403213	2008 TU_{161}	—	October 8, 2008	Kitt Peak	Spacewatch	·	600 m	MPC · JPL
403214	2008 TX_{171}	—	October 8, 2008	Mount Lemmon	Mount Lemmon Survey	·	560 m	MPC · JPL
403215	2008 TE_{183}	—	October 2, 2008	Socorro	LINEAR	·	920 m	MPC · JPL
403216	2008 US_{11}	—	October 8, 2008	Mount Lemmon	Mount Lemmon Survey	·	610 m	MPC · JPL
403217	2008 UX_{71}	—	October 21, 2008	Kitt Peak	Spacewatch	·	660 m	MPC · JPL
403218	2008 UQ_{81}	—	December 3, 2005	Kitt Peak	Spacewatch	·	560 m	MPC · JPL
403219	2008 US_{105}	—	October 8, 2008	Kitt Peak	Spacewatch	·	580 m	MPC · JPL
403220	2008 UN_{125}	—	October 22, 2008	Kitt Peak	Spacewatch	·	730 m	MPC · JPL
403221	2008 UN_{145}	—	October 23, 2008	Kitt Peak	Spacewatch	·	420 m	MPC · JPL
403222	2008 US_{151}	—	October 23, 2008	Kitt Peak	Spacewatch	·	550 m	MPC · JPL
403223	2008 US_{204}	—	October 6, 2008	Catalina	CSS	·	640 m	MPC · JPL
403224	2008 UJ_{211}	—	October 1, 2008	Mount Lemmon	Mount Lemmon Survey	·	530 m	MPC · JPL
403225	2008 UT_{221}	—	October 25, 2008	Kitt Peak	Spacewatch	·	630 m	MPC · JPL
403226	2008 UP_{224}	—	October 25, 2008	Kitt Peak	Spacewatch	·	560 m	MPC · JPL
403227	2008 UH_{229}	—	October 25, 2008	Mount Lemmon	Mount Lemmon Survey	·	1.1 km	MPC · JPL
403228	2008 UP_{239}	—	October 26, 2008	Kitt Peak	Spacewatch	·	790 m	MPC · JPL
403229	2008 UH_{275}	—	October 20, 2008	Kitt Peak	Spacewatch	·	660 m	MPC · JPL
403230	2008 UO_{283}	—	October 28, 2008	Mount Lemmon	Mount Lemmon Survey	·	840 m	MPC · JPL
403231	2008 UU_{286}	—	October 28, 2008	Mount Lemmon	Mount Lemmon Survey	·	680 m	MPC · JPL
403232	2008 UC_{328}	—	September 23, 2008	Kitt Peak	Spacewatch	·	660 m	MPC · JPL
403233	2008 UM_{338}	—	October 21, 2008	Kitt Peak	Spacewatch	·	660 m	MPC · JPL
403234	2008 UX_{343}	—	October 25, 2008	Kitt Peak	Spacewatch	·	950 m	MPC · JPL
403235	2008 UL_{351}	—	October 28, 2008	Mount Lemmon	Mount Lemmon Survey	·	690 m	MPC · JPL
403236	2008 UU_{353}	—	October 20, 2008	Kitt Peak	Spacewatch	·	710 m	MPC · JPL
403237	2008 VE_{11}	—	November 2, 2008	Mount Lemmon	Mount Lemmon Survey	T_{j} (2.95) · 3:2	5.1 km	MPC · JPL
403238	2008 VD_{16}	—	November 1, 2008	Kitt Peak	Spacewatch	(2076)	680 m	MPC · JPL
403239	2008 VK_{67}	—	November 7, 2008	Mount Lemmon	Mount Lemmon Survey	·	730 m	MPC · JPL
403240	2008 VH_{70}	—	November 7, 2008	Mount Lemmon	Mount Lemmon Survey	3:2	5.7 km	MPC · JPL
403241	2008 VK_{80}	—	November 1, 2008	Mount Lemmon	Mount Lemmon Survey	·	1.3 km	MPC · JPL
403242	2008 WD_{31}	—	November 19, 2008	Mount Lemmon	Mount Lemmon Survey	·	710 m	MPC · JPL
403243	2008 WY_{31}	—	January 30, 2006	Kitt Peak	Spacewatch	·	690 m	MPC · JPL
403244	2008 WE_{34}	—	May 25, 2007	Mount Lemmon	Mount Lemmon Survey	·	980 m	MPC · JPL
403245	2008 WP_{136}	—	November 20, 2008	Socorro	LINEAR	·	830 m	MPC · JPL
403246	2008 XT	—	December 1, 2008	Vail-Jarnac	Jarnac	·	830 m	MPC · JPL
403247	2008 XO_{2}	—	December 5, 2008	Mount Lemmon	Mount Lemmon Survey	AMO	500 m	MPC · JPL
403248	2008 XU_{12}	—	November 3, 2008	Mount Lemmon	Mount Lemmon Survey	·	590 m	MPC · JPL
403249	2008 XO_{51}	—	December 2, 2008	Kitt Peak	Spacewatch	·	730 m	MPC · JPL
403250	2008 YC	—	November 19, 2008	Kitt Peak	Spacewatch	·	840 m	MPC · JPL
403251	2008 YC_{10}	—	December 19, 2008	Lulin	LUSS	V	820 m	MPC · JPL
403252	2008 YR_{10}	—	November 18, 2008	Kitt Peak	Spacewatch	·	920 m	MPC · JPL
403253	2008 YF_{16}	—	December 21, 2008	Mount Lemmon	Mount Lemmon Survey	·	790 m	MPC · JPL
403254	2008 YL_{18}	—	December 21, 2008	Kitt Peak	Spacewatch	·	1.2 km	MPC · JPL
403255	2008 YP_{44}	—	February 12, 2002	Kitt Peak	Spacewatch	·	980 m	MPC · JPL
403256	2008 YH_{47}	—	November 8, 2008	Mount Lemmon	Mount Lemmon Survey	·	1.7 km	MPC · JPL
403257	2008 YL_{65}	—	December 30, 2008	Kitt Peak	Spacewatch	·	540 m	MPC · JPL
403258	2008 YH_{78}	—	December 30, 2008	Mount Lemmon	Mount Lemmon Survey	·	590 m	MPC · JPL
403259	2008 YR_{79}	—	December 30, 2008	Mount Lemmon	Mount Lemmon Survey	·	960 m	MPC · JPL
403260	2008 YE_{80}	—	December 30, 2008	Mount Lemmon	Mount Lemmon Survey	·	1.3 km	MPC · JPL
403261	2008 YE_{105}	—	December 29, 2008	Kitt Peak	Spacewatch	V	670 m	MPC · JPL
403262	2008 YF_{126}	—	December 30, 2008	Kitt Peak	Spacewatch	·	660 m	MPC · JPL
403263	2008 YC_{137}	—	December 4, 2008	Mount Lemmon	Mount Lemmon Survey	·	1.1 km	MPC · JPL
403264	2008 YD_{137}	—	October 5, 2004	Kitt Peak	Spacewatch	·	1.1 km	MPC · JPL
403265	2008 YQ_{144}	—	December 30, 2008	Mount Lemmon	Mount Lemmon Survey	·	700 m	MPC · JPL
403266	2008 YE_{145}	—	December 30, 2008	Kitt Peak	Spacewatch	·	900 m	MPC · JPL
403267	2008 YW_{150}	—	December 22, 2008	Mount Lemmon	Mount Lemmon Survey	·	820 m	MPC · JPL
403268	2008 YZ_{150}	—	January 7, 2002	Kitt Peak	Spacewatch	·	720 m	MPC · JPL
403269	2008 YB_{154}	—	December 21, 2008	Kitt Peak	Spacewatch	·	1.5 km	MPC · JPL
403270	2008 YR_{165}	—	December 30, 2008	Kitt Peak	Spacewatch	·	1.0 km	MPC · JPL
403271	2009 AM_{2}	—	January 2, 2009	Mount Lemmon	Mount Lemmon Survey	·	1.3 km	MPC · JPL
403272	2009 AJ_{10}	—	January 2, 2009	Mount Lemmon	Mount Lemmon Survey	·	630 m	MPC · JPL
403273	2009 AT_{14}	—	November 23, 2008	Mount Lemmon	Mount Lemmon Survey	NYS	1.1 km	MPC · JPL
403274	2009 AY_{22}	—	January 3, 2009	Kitt Peak	Spacewatch	·	1.2 km	MPC · JPL
403275	2009 AO_{39}	—	January 15, 2009	Kitt Peak	Spacewatch	·	680 m	MPC · JPL
403276	2009 AB_{41}	—	November 24, 2008	Mount Lemmon	Mount Lemmon Survey	·	1.2 km	MPC · JPL
403277	2009 AD_{46}	—	January 3, 2009	Mount Lemmon	Mount Lemmon Survey	·	1.6 km	MPC · JPL
403278	2009 AV_{46}	—	January 2, 2009	Kitt Peak	Spacewatch	·	1.1 km	MPC · JPL
403279	2009 BJ_{20}	—	November 24, 2008	Mount Lemmon	Mount Lemmon Survey	NYS	1.3 km	MPC · JPL
403280	2009 BD_{22}	—	January 1, 2009	Mount Lemmon	Mount Lemmon Survey	·	760 m	MPC · JPL
403281	2009 BJ_{23}	—	December 1, 2008	Mount Lemmon	Mount Lemmon Survey	·	1.2 km	MPC · JPL
403282	2009 BF_{27}	—	September 5, 2007	Mount Lemmon	Mount Lemmon Survey	·	840 m	MPC · JPL
403283	2009 BA_{36}	—	December 4, 2008	Mount Lemmon	Mount Lemmon Survey	·	1.1 km	MPC · JPL
403284	2009 BH_{44}	—	January 16, 2009	Kitt Peak	Spacewatch	·	640 m	MPC · JPL
403285	2009 BC_{51}	—	January 16, 2009	Mount Lemmon	Mount Lemmon Survey	·	890 m	MPC · JPL
403286	2009 BL_{56}	—	January 17, 2009	Mount Lemmon	Mount Lemmon Survey	·	830 m	MPC · JPL
403287	2009 BD_{62}	—	January 18, 2009	Mount Lemmon	Mount Lemmon Survey	·	1.2 km	MPC · JPL
403288	2009 BC_{64}	—	January 20, 2009	Catalina	CSS	·	780 m	MPC · JPL
403289	2009 BU_{72}	—	December 31, 2008	Mount Lemmon	Mount Lemmon Survey	·	940 m	MPC · JPL
403290	2009 BO_{75}	—	December 3, 2008	Mount Lemmon	Mount Lemmon Survey	V	850 m	MPC · JPL
403291	2009 BX_{86}	—	January 25, 2009	Kitt Peak	Spacewatch	·	530 m	MPC · JPL
403292	2009 BW_{96}	—	January 25, 2009	Catalina	CSS	·	940 m	MPC · JPL
403293	2009 BQ_{104}	—	January 16, 2009	Kitt Peak	Spacewatch	·	800 m	MPC · JPL
403294	2009 BD_{107}	—	January 17, 2009	Kitt Peak	Spacewatch	·	1.4 km	MPC · JPL
403295	2009 BX_{108}	—	January 29, 2009	Mount Lemmon	Mount Lemmon Survey	NYS	1.1 km	MPC · JPL
403296	2009 BC_{109}	—	January 30, 2009	Mount Lemmon	Mount Lemmon Survey	·	950 m	MPC · JPL
403297	2009 BF_{116}	—	January 29, 2009	Kitt Peak	Spacewatch	·	1.4 km	MPC · JPL
403298	2009 BJ_{144}	—	January 30, 2009	Kitt Peak	Spacewatch	·	650 m	MPC · JPL
403299	2009 BR_{158}	—	January 31, 2009	Kitt Peak	Spacewatch	·	1.3 km	MPC · JPL
403300	2009 BH_{162}	—	October 9, 2007	Mount Lemmon	Mount Lemmon Survey	·	1.0 km	MPC · JPL

== 403301–403400 ==
back to top

Designation			Discovery			Properties		Ref
Permanent	Provisional	Named after	Date	Site	Discoverer(s)	Category	Diam.	Ref
403301	2009 BL_{164}	—	January 31, 2009	Kitt Peak	Spacewatch	·	880 m	MPC · JPL
403302	2009 BT_{173}	—	January 20, 2009	Mount Lemmon	Mount Lemmon Survey	·	1.5 km	MPC · JPL
403303	2009 BA_{175}	—	September 11, 2007	Mount Lemmon	Mount Lemmon Survey	·	810 m	MPC · JPL
403304	2009 BH_{182}	—	January 17, 2009	Kitt Peak	Spacewatch	PHO	1.1 km	MPC · JPL
403305	2009 BZ_{184}	—	October 11, 2004	Kitt Peak	Spacewatch	·	2.0 km	MPC · JPL
403306	2009 BP_{190}	—	January 31, 2009	Mount Lemmon	Mount Lemmon Survey	·	1.1 km	MPC · JPL
403307	2009 CR_{6}	—	February 14, 2009	Heppenheim	Starkenburg	V	580 m	MPC · JPL
403308	2009 CD_{18}	—	January 20, 2009	Mount Lemmon	Mount Lemmon Survey	·	1.5 km	MPC · JPL
403309	2009 CE_{27}	—	February 1, 2009	Kitt Peak	Spacewatch	V	780 m	MPC · JPL
403310	2009 CA_{29}	—	February 1, 2009	Kitt Peak	Spacewatch	MAS	630 m	MPC · JPL
403311	2009 CC_{29}	—	December 22, 2008	Mount Lemmon	Mount Lemmon Survey	·	1.2 km	MPC · JPL
403312	2009 CH_{29}	—	February 1, 2009	Kitt Peak	Spacewatch	·	1.4 km	MPC · JPL
403313	2009 CS_{29}	—	February 1, 2009	Kitt Peak	Spacewatch	·	640 m	MPC · JPL
403314	2009 CX_{32}	—	February 1, 2009	Kitt Peak	Spacewatch	·	930 m	MPC · JPL
403315	2009 CG_{43}	—	February 14, 2009	Catalina	CSS	·	1.2 km	MPC · JPL
403316	2009 CF_{45}	—	January 17, 2009	Mount Lemmon	Mount Lemmon Survey	NYS	990 m	MPC · JPL
403317	2009 CW_{59}	—	February 15, 2009	Catalina	CSS	·	1.0 km	MPC · JPL
403318	2009 CK_{62}	—	February 4, 2009	Kitt Peak	Spacewatch	·	1.3 km	MPC · JPL
403319	2009 DU_{14}	—	February 19, 2009	Mount Lemmon	Mount Lemmon Survey	JUN	750 m	MPC · JPL
403320	2009 DS_{15}	—	February 16, 2009	La Sagra	OAM	·	1.1 km	MPC · JPL
403321	2009 DW_{17}	—	February 19, 2009	Kitt Peak	Spacewatch	·	1.1 km	MPC · JPL
403322	2009 DS_{19}	—	February 21, 2009	Catalina	CSS	·	1.5 km	MPC · JPL
403323	2009 DZ_{20}	—	January 18, 2009	Kitt Peak	Spacewatch	·	900 m	MPC · JPL
403324	2009 DX_{21}	—	February 19, 2009	Kitt Peak	Spacewatch	·	890 m	MPC · JPL
403325	2009 DW_{22}	—	January 1, 2009	Mount Lemmon	Mount Lemmon Survey	·	600 m	MPC · JPL
403326	2009 DU_{25}	—	January 31, 2009	Kitt Peak	Spacewatch	·	720 m	MPC · JPL
403327	2009 DC_{33}	—	August 23, 2007	Kitt Peak	Spacewatch	·	950 m	MPC · JPL
403328	2009 DK_{53}	—	November 19, 2007	Kitt Peak	Spacewatch	·	2.1 km	MPC · JPL
403329	2009 DJ_{60}	—	February 22, 2009	Kitt Peak	Spacewatch	·	1.3 km	MPC · JPL
403330	2009 DC_{70}	—	February 26, 2009	Catalina	CSS	NYS	980 m	MPC · JPL
403331	2009 DP_{77}	—	February 4, 2009	Mount Lemmon	Mount Lemmon Survey	·	1.3 km	MPC · JPL
403332	2009 DG_{85}	—	February 27, 2009	Kitt Peak	Spacewatch	V	620 m	MPC · JPL
403333	2009 DX_{91}	—	February 27, 2009	Kitt Peak	Spacewatch	AEO	1.1 km	MPC · JPL
403334	2009 DT_{93}	—	February 28, 2009	Mount Lemmon	Mount Lemmon Survey	·	1.5 km	MPC · JPL
403335	2009 DE_{94}	—	February 28, 2009	Mount Lemmon	Mount Lemmon Survey	·	1.2 km	MPC · JPL
403336	2009 DV_{112}	—	February 27, 2009	Catalina	CSS	NYS	1.1 km	MPC · JPL
403337	2009 DB_{119}	—	February 27, 2009	Kitt Peak	Spacewatch	·	1.2 km	MPC · JPL
403338	2009 DA_{124}	—	February 19, 2009	Kitt Peak	Spacewatch	·	870 m	MPC · JPL
403339	2009 DF_{127}	—	February 20, 2009	Kitt Peak	Spacewatch	·	1.3 km	MPC · JPL
403340	2009 DN_{131}	—	February 19, 2009	Kitt Peak	Spacewatch	MAS	930 m	MPC · JPL
403341	2009 DH_{134}	—	March 17, 2005	Mount Lemmon	Mount Lemmon Survey	·	1.1 km	MPC · JPL
403342	2009 DM_{137}	—	February 28, 2009	Kitt Peak	Spacewatch	·	1.3 km	MPC · JPL
403343	2009 EZ_{12}	—	March 3, 2009	Catalina	CSS	EUN	2.2 km	MPC · JPL
403344	2009 EM_{24}	—	October 25, 2003	Kitt Peak	Spacewatch	·	1.1 km	MPC · JPL
403345	2009 EF_{25}	—	January 15, 1999	Kitt Peak	Spacewatch	KOR	1.4 km	MPC · JPL
403346	2009 EY_{30}	—	March 2, 2009	Mount Lemmon	Mount Lemmon Survey	·	1.1 km	MPC · JPL
403347	2009 FS_{3}	—	March 17, 2009	La Sagra	OAM	V	760 m	MPC · JPL
403348	2009 FB_{34}	—	January 25, 2009	Kitt Peak	Spacewatch	·	770 m	MPC · JPL
403349	2009 FV_{55}	—	March 17, 2009	Siding Spring	SSS	·	1.6 km	MPC · JPL
403350	2009 FY_{61}	—	January 31, 2009	Mount Lemmon	Mount Lemmon Survey	(5)	1.3 km	MPC · JPL
403351	2009 FT_{68}	—	March 26, 2009	Mount Lemmon	Mount Lemmon Survey	·	1.5 km	MPC · JPL
403352	2009 FJ_{71}	—	March 31, 2009	Kitt Peak	Spacewatch	·	1.4 km	MPC · JPL
403353	2009 FH_{72}	—	March 18, 2009	Kitt Peak	Spacewatch	·	2.2 km	MPC · JPL
403354	2009 FH_{74}	—	March 31, 2009	Kitt Peak	Spacewatch	·	1.2 km	MPC · JPL
403355	2009 FY_{74}	—	March 27, 2009	Siding Spring	SSS	·	1.7 km	MPC · JPL
403356	2009 FX_{75}	—	March 24, 2009	Kitt Peak	Spacewatch	·	2.4 km	MPC · JPL
403357	2009 HP	—	February 27, 2009	Catalina	CSS	·	2.4 km	MPC · JPL
403358	2009 HR_{3}	—	April 2, 2009	Mount Lemmon	Mount Lemmon Survey	·	2.0 km	MPC · JPL
403359	2009 HQ_{4}	—	April 17, 2009	Kitt Peak	Spacewatch	·	1.0 km	MPC · JPL
403360	2009 HS_{5}	—	March 7, 2009	Mount Lemmon	Mount Lemmon Survey	·	1.4 km	MPC · JPL
403361	2009 HP_{6}	—	April 17, 2009	Kitt Peak	Spacewatch	·	1.3 km	MPC · JPL
403362	2009 HE_{37}	—	July 21, 2006	Mount Lemmon	Mount Lemmon Survey	RAF	1.2 km	MPC · JPL
403363	2009 HR_{42}	—	April 20, 2009	Kitt Peak	Spacewatch	·	2.4 km	MPC · JPL
403364	2009 HB_{47}	—	April 18, 2009	Kitt Peak	Spacewatch	·	1.1 km	MPC · JPL
403365	2009 HF_{49}	—	April 19, 2009	Kitt Peak	Spacewatch	·	3.0 km	MPC · JPL
403366	2009 HJ_{53}	—	April 19, 2009	Mount Lemmon	Mount Lemmon Survey	·	950 m	MPC · JPL
403367	2009 HN_{66}	—	April 19, 2009	Kitt Peak	Spacewatch	(1547)	1.5 km	MPC · JPL
403368	2009 HQ_{66}	—	April 24, 2009	Kitt Peak	Spacewatch	·	1.1 km	MPC · JPL
403369	2009 HX_{74}	—	April 27, 2009	Mount Lemmon	Mount Lemmon Survey	·	1.3 km	MPC · JPL
403370	2009 HG_{75}	—	April 27, 2009	Kitt Peak	Spacewatch	ADE	3.4 km	MPC · JPL
403371	2009 HC_{79}	—	April 26, 2009	Kitt Peak	Spacewatch	·	1.4 km	MPC · JPL
403372	2009 HO_{80}	—	March 19, 2009	Kitt Peak	Spacewatch	·	1.7 km	MPC · JPL
403373	2009 HS_{80}	—	June 4, 2005	Kitt Peak	Spacewatch	EUN	1.4 km	MPC · JPL
403374	2009 HN_{96}	—	April 23, 2009	Kitt Peak	Spacewatch	·	1.6 km	MPC · JPL
403375	2009 HX_{103}	—	April 20, 2009	Kitt Peak	Spacewatch	BRG	1.6 km	MPC · JPL
403376	2009 JB_{10}	—	March 24, 2009	Mount Lemmon	Mount Lemmon Survey	·	1.2 km	MPC · JPL
403377	2009 JD_{12}	—	April 20, 2009	Kitt Peak	Spacewatch	·	1.6 km	MPC · JPL
403378	2009 KC_{11}	—	May 25, 2009	Kitt Peak	Spacewatch	·	2.0 km	MPC · JPL
403379	2009 KU_{21}	—	May 27, 2009	Mount Lemmon	Mount Lemmon Survey	·	4.3 km	MPC · JPL
403380	2009 MF_{9}	—	June 15, 2009	Kitt Peak	Spacewatch	·	2.9 km	MPC · JPL
403381	2009 OQ_{18}	—	July 28, 2009	Kitt Peak	Spacewatch	·	2.9 km	MPC · JPL
403382	2009 PS_{4}	—	December 26, 2005	Kitt Peak	Spacewatch	EOS	2.1 km	MPC · JPL
403383	2009 PO_{19}	—	August 15, 2009	Kitt Peak	Spacewatch	·	1.6 km	MPC · JPL
403384	2009 PS_{20}	—	August 27, 2009	Catalina	CSS	·	3.1 km	MPC · JPL
403385	2009 PX_{20}	—	August 15, 2009	Catalina	CSS	·	3.9 km	MPC · JPL
403386	2009 QM_{11}	—	August 22, 2009	Sandlot	G. Hug	·	2.0 km	MPC · JPL
403387	2009 QQ_{13}	—	August 16, 2009	Kitt Peak	Spacewatch	·	3.8 km	MPC · JPL
403388	2009 QB_{14}	—	August 16, 2009	Kitt Peak	Spacewatch	·	3.2 km	MPC · JPL
403389	2009 QZ_{14}	—	August 16, 2009	Kitt Peak	Spacewatch	·	3.4 km	MPC · JPL
403390	2009 QD_{46}	—	August 27, 2009	Kitt Peak	Spacewatch	EOS	2.3 km	MPC · JPL
403391	2009 QH_{52}	—	August 16, 2009	Kitt Peak	Spacewatch	EOS	2.2 km	MPC · JPL
403392	2009 QE_{55}	—	August 27, 2009	Kitt Peak	Spacewatch	·	2.7 km	MPC · JPL
403393	2009 QH_{56}	—	August 28, 2009	Kitt Peak	Spacewatch	VER	2.3 km	MPC · JPL
403394	2009 QP_{56}	—	August 20, 2009	Kitt Peak	Spacewatch	·	1.7 km	MPC · JPL
403395	2009 QA_{59}	—	August 20, 2009	Kitt Peak	Spacewatch	·	4.1 km	MPC · JPL
403396	2009 QW_{61}	—	August 27, 2009	Kitt Peak	Spacewatch	·	2.9 km	MPC · JPL
403397	2009 QQ_{62}	—	August 17, 2009	Kitt Peak	Spacewatch	·	2.0 km	MPC · JPL
403398	2009 RO_{22}	—	August 15, 2009	Catalina	CSS	·	2.5 km	MPC · JPL
403399	2009 RU_{25}	—	September 15, 2009	Kitt Peak	Spacewatch	·	3.4 km	MPC · JPL
403400	2009 RX_{36}	—	December 30, 2005	Mount Lemmon	Mount Lemmon Survey	·	3.4 km	MPC · JPL

== 403401–403500 ==
back to top

Designation			Discovery			Properties		Ref
Permanent	Provisional	Named after	Date	Site	Discoverer(s)	Category	Diam.	Ref
403401	2009 RW_{44}	—	September 15, 2009	Kitt Peak	Spacewatch	·	2.6 km	MPC · JPL
403402	2009 RR_{45}	—	September 15, 2009	Kitt Peak	Spacewatch	·	2.5 km	MPC · JPL
403403	2009 RT_{48}	—	September 15, 2009	Kitt Peak	Spacewatch	·	3.1 km	MPC · JPL
403404	2009 RX_{50}	—	September 15, 2009	Kitt Peak	Spacewatch	THM	2.8 km	MPC · JPL
403405	2009 RM_{66}	—	September 15, 2009	Kitt Peak	Spacewatch	EOS	2.6 km	MPC · JPL
403406	2009 RK_{71}	—	September 15, 2009	Kitt Peak	Spacewatch	LIX	3.3 km	MPC · JPL
403407	2009 SQ_{14}	—	September 18, 2009	Bisei SG Center	BATTeRS	·	2.5 km	MPC · JPL
403408	2009 SM_{16}	—	September 17, 2009	Mount Lemmon	Mount Lemmon Survey	·	2.6 km	MPC · JPL
403409	2009 SO_{17}	—	September 17, 2009	Moletai	K. Černis, Zdanavicius, J.	·	3.9 km	MPC · JPL
403410	2009 SA_{24}	—	September 16, 2009	Kitt Peak	Spacewatch	·	2.5 km	MPC · JPL
403411	2009 SF_{24}	—	September 16, 2009	Kitt Peak	Spacewatch	·	3.0 km	MPC · JPL
403412	2009 SZ_{35}	—	September 16, 2009	Kitt Peak	Spacewatch	·	3.3 km	MPC · JPL
403413	2009 SV_{64}	—	September 17, 2009	Mount Lemmon	Mount Lemmon Survey	·	2.0 km	MPC · JPL
403414	2009 SU_{72}	—	August 15, 2009	Kitt Peak	Spacewatch	·	3.3 km	MPC · JPL
403415	2009 SU_{75}	—	March 14, 2007	Mount Lemmon	Mount Lemmon Survey	HYG	3.0 km	MPC · JPL
403416	2009 SO_{76}	—	September 17, 2009	Kitt Peak	Spacewatch	·	2.8 km	MPC · JPL
403417	2009 SX_{78}	—	September 18, 2009	Kitt Peak	Spacewatch	·	3.6 km	MPC · JPL
403418	2009 SM_{92}	—	September 18, 2009	Mount Lemmon	Mount Lemmon Survey	·	3.0 km	MPC · JPL
403419	2009 SA_{96}	—	September 19, 2009	Kitt Peak	Spacewatch	·	2.7 km	MPC · JPL
403420	2009 SZ_{100}	—	August 17, 2009	Kitt Peak	Spacewatch	·	2.2 km	MPC · JPL
403421	2009 SZ_{111}	—	September 18, 2009	Kitt Peak	Spacewatch	HYG	3.3 km	MPC · JPL
403422	2009 SJ_{113}	—	September 18, 2009	Kitt Peak	Spacewatch	·	2.4 km	MPC · JPL
403423	2009 SL_{115}	—	September 18, 2009	Kitt Peak	Spacewatch	EOS	2.3 km	MPC · JPL
403424	2009 SK_{116}	—	September 18, 2009	Mount Lemmon	Mount Lemmon Survey	·	2.3 km	MPC · JPL
403425	2009 SO_{122}	—	September 18, 2009	Mount Lemmon	Mount Lemmon Survey	·	2.0 km	MPC · JPL
403426	2009 SS_{129}	—	September 18, 2009	Kitt Peak	Spacewatch	THM	2.0 km	MPC · JPL
403427	2009 ST_{130}	—	September 18, 2009	Kitt Peak	Spacewatch	·	3.2 km	MPC · JPL
403428	2009 SJ_{132}	—	September 18, 2009	Kitt Peak	Spacewatch	·	2.3 km	MPC · JPL
403429	2009 SA_{141}	—	September 18, 2003	Kitt Peak	Spacewatch	·	3.2 km	MPC · JPL
403430	2009 ST_{175}	—	September 19, 2009	Mount Lemmon	Mount Lemmon Survey	·	3.6 km	MPC · JPL
403431	2009 SD_{183}	—	September 21, 2009	Kitt Peak	Spacewatch	·	2.9 km	MPC · JPL
403432	2009 SK_{183}	—	September 21, 2009	Kitt Peak	Spacewatch	CYB	4.1 km	MPC · JPL
403433	2009 SZ_{183}	—	September 17, 2009	Kitt Peak	Spacewatch	EOS	2.1 km	MPC · JPL
403434	2009 SG_{185}	—	September 21, 2009	Kitt Peak	Spacewatch	·	3.4 km	MPC · JPL
403435	2009 SM_{192}	—	September 10, 2009	Catalina	CSS	·	2.9 km	MPC · JPL
403436	2009 SL_{206}	—	September 23, 2009	Kitt Peak	Spacewatch	·	2.5 km	MPC · JPL
403437	2009 SW_{212}	—	September 23, 2009	Kitt Peak	Spacewatch	·	2.0 km	MPC · JPL
403438	2009 SF_{213}	—	September 23, 2009	Kitt Peak	Spacewatch	·	4.0 km	MPC · JPL
403439	2009 SA_{216}	—	September 24, 2009	Kitt Peak	Spacewatch	VER	3.0 km	MPC · JPL
403440	2009 SY_{229}	—	September 16, 2009	Kitt Peak	Spacewatch	·	2.5 km	MPC · JPL
403441	2009 SM_{233}	—	September 20, 2009	Mount Lemmon	Mount Lemmon Survey	LIX	4.2 km	MPC · JPL
403442	2009 SX_{234}	—	September 17, 2009	Catalina	CSS	·	3.4 km	MPC · JPL
403443	2009 SW_{238}	—	September 16, 2009	Catalina	CSS	·	3.5 km	MPC · JPL
403444	2009 SY_{245}	—	September 17, 2009	Kitt Peak	Spacewatch	·	2.5 km	MPC · JPL
403445	2009 SB_{251}	—	July 28, 2009	Kitt Peak	Spacewatch	·	3.4 km	MPC · JPL
403446	2009 SW_{268}	—	September 24, 2009	Kitt Peak	Spacewatch	THM	2.2 km	MPC · JPL
403447	2009 SQ_{273}	—	September 17, 2009	Kitt Peak	Spacewatch	·	3.5 km	MPC · JPL
403448	2009 SM_{276}	—	September 17, 2009	Kitt Peak	Spacewatch	·	3.1 km	MPC · JPL
403449	2009 SH_{288}	—	September 21, 2009	Kitt Peak	Spacewatch	·	3.1 km	MPC · JPL
403450	2009 SP_{289}	—	September 25, 2009	Kitt Peak	Spacewatch	·	2.8 km	MPC · JPL
403451	2009 SX_{293}	—	September 26, 2009	Kitt Peak	Spacewatch	·	2.6 km	MPC · JPL
403452	2009 SA_{294}	—	September 27, 2009	Kitt Peak	Spacewatch	·	2.8 km	MPC · JPL
403453	2009 SL_{305}	—	September 17, 2009	Kitt Peak	Spacewatch	·	1.9 km	MPC · JPL
403454	2009 SU_{309}	—	September 18, 2009	Kitt Peak	Spacewatch	·	3.5 km	MPC · JPL
403455	2009 ST_{318}	—	September 20, 2009	Kitt Peak	Spacewatch	·	2.6 km	MPC · JPL
403456	2009 SC_{319}	—	December 27, 2005	Kitt Peak	Spacewatch	·	2.8 km	MPC · JPL
403457	2009 SY_{321}	—	September 22, 2009	Kitt Peak	Spacewatch	·	3.7 km	MPC · JPL
403458	2009 SE_{330}	—	September 18, 2009	Kitt Peak	Spacewatch	EOS	2.2 km	MPC · JPL
403459	2009 SL_{332}	—	September 21, 2009	Catalina	CSS	·	2.6 km	MPC · JPL
403460	2009 SD_{336}	—	September 23, 2009	Kitt Peak	Spacewatch	·	2.2 km	MPC · JPL
403461	2009 ST_{342}	—	September 16, 2009	Catalina	CSS	·	2.4 km	MPC · JPL
403462	2009 SA_{343}	—	September 17, 2009	Kitt Peak	Spacewatch	·	3.5 km	MPC · JPL
403463	2009 SE_{352}	—	September 22, 2009	Catalina	CSS	·	2.6 km	MPC · JPL
403464	2009 SG_{353}	—	September 19, 2009	Kitt Peak	Spacewatch	·	2.2 km	MPC · JPL
403465	2009 SB_{363}	—	September 15, 2009	Kitt Peak	Spacewatch	·	3.2 km	MPC · JPL
403466	2009 TM_{4}	—	September 15, 2009	Kitt Peak	Spacewatch	·	2.5 km	MPC · JPL
403467	2009 TU_{4}	—	July 27, 2009	Kitt Peak	Spacewatch	·	3.2 km	MPC · JPL
403468	2009 TZ_{7}	—	September 28, 2009	Mount Lemmon	Mount Lemmon Survey	·	2.8 km	MPC · JPL
403469	2009 TV_{9}	—	October 15, 2009	Mayhill	Lowe, A.	·	3.5 km	MPC · JPL
403470	2009 TP_{10}	—	December 16, 1993	Kitt Peak	Spacewatch	·	4.3 km	MPC · JPL
403471	2009 TT_{19}	—	October 11, 2009	Mount Lemmon	Mount Lemmon Survey	THM	2.6 km	MPC · JPL
403472	2009 TB_{27}	—	September 16, 2009	Catalina	CSS	TIR	3.5 km	MPC · JPL
403473	2009 TN_{33}	—	October 9, 2009	Catalina	CSS	·	3.3 km	MPC · JPL
403474	2009 TB_{34}	—	October 10, 2009	Catalina	CSS	EOS	2.6 km	MPC · JPL
403475	2009 TP_{42}	—	October 12, 2009	Mount Lemmon	Mount Lemmon Survey	·	3.4 km	MPC · JPL
403476	2009 UD_{3}	—	October 14, 2009	Mount Lemmon	Mount Lemmon Survey	·	3.9 km	MPC · JPL
403477	2009 UK_{5}	—	January 26, 2006	Catalina	CSS	·	4.1 km	MPC · JPL
403478	2009 UL_{8}	—	October 16, 2009	Catalina	CSS	·	2.8 km	MPC · JPL
403479	2009 UQ_{20}	—	October 2, 2009	Mount Lemmon	Mount Lemmon Survey	·	3.3 km	MPC · JPL
403480	2009 UP_{21}	—	October 16, 2009	Mount Lemmon	Mount Lemmon Survey	·	3.5 km	MPC · JPL
403481	2009 UL_{27}	—	September 19, 2009	Mount Lemmon	Mount Lemmon Survey	·	3.8 km	MPC · JPL
403482	2009 UP_{30}	—	October 18, 2009	Mount Lemmon	Mount Lemmon Survey	THM	3.2 km	MPC · JPL
403483	2009 UH_{38}	—	October 22, 2009	Mount Lemmon	Mount Lemmon Survey	·	2.0 km	MPC · JPL
403484	2009 UB_{41}	—	October 18, 2009	Mount Lemmon	Mount Lemmon Survey	THM	1.8 km	MPC · JPL
403485	2009 UB_{54}	—	October 23, 2009	Mount Lemmon	Mount Lemmon Survey	·	2.4 km	MPC · JPL
403486	2009 UX_{57}	—	October 23, 2009	Mount Lemmon	Mount Lemmon Survey	·	3.5 km	MPC · JPL
403487	2009 UU_{61}	—	October 17, 2009	Mount Lemmon	Mount Lemmon Survey	·	2.5 km	MPC · JPL
403488	2009 UC_{71}	—	October 22, 2009	Catalina	CSS	·	2.9 km	MPC · JPL
403489	2009 UD_{73}	—	May 3, 2008	Kitt Peak	Spacewatch	·	2.0 km	MPC · JPL
403490	2009 UJ_{73}	—	October 18, 2009	Mount Lemmon	Mount Lemmon Survey	3:2	6.7 km	MPC · JPL
403491 Anthonygrayling	2009 UX_{73}	Anthonygrayling	October 21, 2009	Catalina	CSS	·	2.7 km	MPC · JPL
403492	2009 UD_{89}	—	October 24, 2009	Catalina	CSS	·	2.9 km	MPC · JPL
403493	2009 UE_{89}	—	October 26, 2009	Nazaret	Muler, G.	·	3.0 km	MPC · JPL
403494	2009 UR_{89}	—	October 24, 2009	Catalina	CSS	EOS	2.3 km	MPC · JPL
403495	2009 UM_{98}	—	October 23, 2009	Mount Lemmon	Mount Lemmon Survey	·	2.6 km	MPC · JPL
403496	2009 UY_{131}	—	October 16, 2009	Catalina	CSS	·	2.4 km	MPC · JPL
403497	2009 UT_{132}	—	October 17, 2009	Catalina	CSS	TIR	3.2 km	MPC · JPL
403498	2009 UA_{137}	—	October 27, 2009	La Sagra	OAM	LIX	4.0 km	MPC · JPL
403499	2009 UK_{147}	—	October 24, 2009	Kitt Peak	Spacewatch	·	2.4 km	MPC · JPL
403500	2009 VY_{14}	—	October 24, 2009	Kitt Peak	Spacewatch	·	2.2 km	MPC · JPL

== 403501–403600 ==
back to top

Designation			Discovery			Properties		Ref
Permanent	Provisional	Named after	Date	Site	Discoverer(s)	Category	Diam.	Ref
403501	2009 VS_{22}	—	November 9, 2009	Mount Lemmon	Mount Lemmon Survey	·	2.5 km	MPC · JPL
403502	2009 VZ_{36}	—	November 8, 2009	Kitt Peak	Spacewatch	·	2.2 km	MPC · JPL
403503	2009 VN_{59}	—	November 9, 2009	Catalina	CSS	·	2.4 km	MPC · JPL
403504	2009 VP_{61}	—	November 8, 2009	Kitt Peak	Spacewatch	THM	2.2 km	MPC · JPL
403505	2009 VO_{80}	—	September 22, 2009	Catalina	CSS	·	4.7 km	MPC · JPL
403506	2009 VY_{82}	—	November 9, 2009	Kitt Peak	Spacewatch	·	3.8 km	MPC · JPL
403507	2009 VY_{91}	—	November 9, 2009	Catalina	CSS	·	3.4 km	MPC · JPL
403508	2009 VT_{92}	—	October 1, 2009	Mount Lemmon	Mount Lemmon Survey	TIR	3.5 km	MPC · JPL
403509	2009 WQ_{5}	—	November 17, 2009	Vail-Jarnac	Jarnac	·	2.3 km	MPC · JPL
403510	2009 WJ_{52}	—	October 24, 2009	Catalina	CSS	·	2.8 km	MPC · JPL
403511	2009 WY_{89}	—	January 23, 2006	Mount Lemmon	Mount Lemmon Survey	·	1.9 km	MPC · JPL
403512	2009 WT_{118}	—	November 20, 2009	Kitt Peak	Spacewatch	THM	2.1 km	MPC · JPL
403513	2009 WG_{120}	—	November 14, 1998	Kitt Peak	Spacewatch	THM	2.0 km	MPC · JPL
403514	2009 WW_{236}	—	September 22, 2009	Mount Lemmon	Mount Lemmon Survey	THM	2.5 km	MPC · JPL
403515	2009 XZ_{15}	—	December 15, 2009	Mount Lemmon	Mount Lemmon Survey	3:2	4.7 km	MPC · JPL
403516	2010 AN_{3}	—	January 8, 2010	Catalina	CSS	T_{j} (2.93)	4.9 km	MPC · JPL
403517	2010 AR_{3}	—	January 6, 2010	Bisei SG Center	BATTeRS	·	1.2 km	MPC · JPL
403518	2010 AR_{101}	—	September 28, 2009	Mount Lemmon	Mount Lemmon Survey	·	2.9 km	MPC · JPL
403519	2010 BJ_{61}	—	September 19, 2003	Kitt Peak	Spacewatch	·	2.3 km	MPC · JPL
403520	2010 CS_{6}	—	February 6, 2010	WISE	WISE	·	1.8 km	MPC · JPL
403521	2010 CH_{70}	—	February 13, 2010	Mount Lemmon	Mount Lemmon Survey	3:2	5.0 km	MPC · JPL
403522	2010 CB_{83}	—	February 14, 2010	Mount Lemmon	Mount Lemmon Survey	3:2	5.6 km	MPC · JPL
403523	2010 CN_{150}	—	February 14, 2010	Mount Lemmon	Mount Lemmon Survey	·	1.6 km	MPC · JPL
403524	2010 DD_{3}	—	April 5, 2003	Kitt Peak	Spacewatch	MAS	780 m	MPC · JPL
403525	2010 DF_{45}	—	February 17, 2010	Kitt Peak	Spacewatch	·	890 m	MPC · JPL
403526	2010 ES_{36}	—	February 13, 2010	Kitt Peak	Spacewatch	·	1.2 km	MPC · JPL
403527	2010 EC_{78}	—	April 8, 2003	Kitt Peak	Spacewatch	V	650 m	MPC · JPL
403528	2010 ES_{101}	—	September 28, 1992	Kitt Peak	Spacewatch	·	1.3 km	MPC · JPL
403529	2010 ED_{127}	—	March 13, 2010	Catalina	CSS	·	1.0 km	MPC · JPL
403530	2010 EJ_{131}	—	October 28, 2008	Kitt Peak	Spacewatch	·	740 m	MPC · JPL
403531	2010 FN_{1}	—	March 16, 2010	Mount Lemmon	Mount Lemmon Survey	·	1.9 km	MPC · JPL
403532	2010 FG_{88}	—	March 22, 2010	ESA OGS	ESA OGS	·	670 m	MPC · JPL
403533	2010 FP_{88}	—	March 17, 2010	Kitt Peak	Spacewatch	·	970 m	MPC · JPL
403534	2010 GZ_{29}	—	April 26, 2003	Kitt Peak	Spacewatch	·	760 m	MPC · JPL
403535	2010 GE_{98}	—	November 8, 2008	Kitt Peak	Spacewatch	·	930 m	MPC · JPL
403536	2010 GW_{102}	—	October 3, 2008	Mount Lemmon	Mount Lemmon Survey	·	590 m	MPC · JPL
403537	2010 GY_{114}	—	April 10, 2010	Kitt Peak	Spacewatch	·	910 m	MPC · JPL
403538	2010 GP_{119}	—	April 11, 2010	Kitt Peak	Spacewatch	(2076)	690 m	MPC · JPL
403539	2010 GN_{140}	—	April 8, 2010	Kitt Peak	Spacewatch	·	880 m	MPC · JPL
403540	2010 GP_{145}	—	March 13, 2010	Mount Lemmon	Mount Lemmon Survey	·	1.1 km	MPC · JPL
403541	2010 GO_{156}	—	December 1, 2005	Kitt Peak	Spacewatch	·	700 m	MPC · JPL
403542	2010 HR_{8}	—	April 17, 2010	WISE	WISE	·	1.8 km	MPC · JPL
403543	2010 HG_{17}	—	April 18, 2010	WISE	WISE	·	2.1 km	MPC · JPL
403544	2010 HF_{80}	—	April 25, 2010	Mount Lemmon	Mount Lemmon Survey	·	1.3 km	MPC · JPL
403545	2010 HM_{80}	—	April 26, 2010	Mount Lemmon	Mount Lemmon Survey	·	1.0 km	MPC · JPL
403546	2010 HQ_{98}	—	April 30, 2010	WISE	WISE	·	1.9 km	MPC · JPL
403547	2010 HB_{104}	—	April 16, 2010	Siding Spring	SSS	·	1.4 km	MPC · JPL
403548	2010 HB_{114}	—	January 23, 2006	Mount Lemmon	Mount Lemmon Survey	PHO	880 m	MPC · JPL
403549	2010 JJ	—	May 3, 2010	Nogales	Tenagra II	·	1.3 km	MPC · JPL
403550	2010 JY_{29}	—	May 3, 2010	Kitt Peak	Spacewatch	NYS	1.1 km	MPC · JPL
403551	2010 JX_{68}	—	May 9, 2010	WISE	WISE	·	2.4 km	MPC · JPL
403552	2010 JP_{71}	—	May 5, 2010	Mount Lemmon	Mount Lemmon Survey	·	1.2 km	MPC · JPL
403553	2010 JR_{72}	—	January 9, 2006	Kitt Peak	Spacewatch	·	800 m	MPC · JPL
403554	2010 JN_{165}	—	May 11, 2010	Mount Lemmon	Mount Lemmon Survey	MAS	630 m	MPC · JPL
403555	2010 JQ_{168}	—	May 12, 2010	Mount Lemmon	Mount Lemmon Survey	·	990 m	MPC · JPL
403556	2010 KU_{58}	—	May 22, 2010	WISE	WISE	·	3.3 km	MPC · JPL
403557	2010 KR_{88}	—	May 27, 2010	WISE	WISE	KON	1.8 km	MPC · JPL
403558	2010 LZ_{4}	—	June 1, 2010	WISE	WISE	(1547)	2.2 km	MPC · JPL
403559	2010 LD_{35}	—	September 5, 2007	Catalina	CSS	·	1.3 km	MPC · JPL
403560	2010 LA_{70}	—	July 21, 2006	Mount Lemmon	Mount Lemmon Survey	·	1.8 km	MPC · JPL
403561	2010 LK_{81}	—	March 31, 2009	Kitt Peak	Spacewatch	·	2.8 km	MPC · JPL
403562	2010 LX_{94}	—	November 16, 2006	Catalina	CSS	·	3.1 km	MPC · JPL
403563 Ledbetter	2010 LY_{97}	Ledbetter	June 13, 2010	WISE	WISE	·	2.5 km	MPC · JPL
403564	2010 MV_{33}	—	June 21, 2010	WISE	WISE	·	2.7 km	MPC · JPL
403565	2010 ML_{60}	—	June 24, 2010	WISE	WISE	·	2.8 km	MPC · JPL
403566	2010 MF_{103}	—	October 16, 2006	Kitt Peak	Spacewatch	·	1.9 km	MPC · JPL
403567	2010 MQ_{107}	—	January 18, 2008	Mount Lemmon	Mount Lemmon Survey	EUN	1.5 km	MPC · JPL
403568	2010 NJ_{6}	—	July 6, 2010	Kitt Peak	Spacewatch	V	870 m	MPC · JPL
403569	2010 NO_{37}	—	November 13, 2006	Mount Lemmon	Mount Lemmon Survey	·	1.6 km	MPC · JPL
403570	2010 NK_{42}	—	July 9, 2010	WISE	WISE	·	1.9 km	MPC · JPL
403571	2010 NJ_{58}	—	November 18, 2001	Kitt Peak	Spacewatch	·	2.4 km	MPC · JPL
403572	2010 NQ_{71}	—	November 17, 2006	Kitt Peak	Spacewatch	·	1.9 km	MPC · JPL
403573	2010 NT_{79}	—	November 25, 2006	Kitt Peak	Spacewatch	·	3.4 km	MPC · JPL
403574	2010 NM_{97}	—	July 11, 2010	WISE	WISE	·	2.7 km	MPC · JPL
403575	2010 NA_{99}	—	September 19, 2001	Socorro	LINEAR	·	2.4 km	MPC · JPL
403576	2010 NL_{108}	—	March 5, 2008	Mount Lemmon	Mount Lemmon Survey	·	2.2 km	MPC · JPL
403577	2010 NV_{114}	—	July 14, 2010	WISE	WISE	HOF	2.2 km	MPC · JPL
403578	2010 OY_{24}	—	February 28, 2008	Kitt Peak	Spacewatch	·	2.6 km	MPC · JPL
403579	2010 OQ_{30}	—	December 26, 2006	Catalina	CSS	·	2.9 km	MPC · JPL
403580	2010 OW_{33}	—	July 20, 2010	WISE	WISE	·	2.6 km	MPC · JPL
403581	2010 OY_{47}	—	September 8, 2001	Socorro	LINEAR	·	1.6 km	MPC · JPL
403582	2010 OQ_{59}	—	July 23, 2010	WISE	WISE	BRG	1.8 km	MPC · JPL
403583	2010 OD_{73}	—	December 9, 2001	Socorro	LINEAR	·	2.1 km	MPC · JPL
403584	2010 OR_{99}	—	September 13, 2005	Kitt Peak	Spacewatch	·	2.7 km	MPC · JPL
403585	2010 OE_{127}	—	September 16, 2006	Catalina	CSS	·	1.2 km	MPC · JPL
403586	2010 PN_{10}	—	March 19, 2005	Siding Spring	SSS	EUN	1.7 km	MPC · JPL
403587	2010 PY_{23}	—	August 3, 2010	Kitt Peak	Spacewatch	·	1.0 km	MPC · JPL
403588	2010 PO_{25}	—	December 17, 2001	Socorro	LINEAR	TIN	1.9 km	MPC · JPL
403589	2010 PA_{40}	—	January 26, 2003	Kitt Peak	Spacewatch	·	1.3 km	MPC · JPL
403590	2010 PY_{46}	—	December 13, 2006	Kitt Peak	Spacewatch	·	2.3 km	MPC · JPL
403591	2010 PF_{58}	—	June 19, 2010	Mount Lemmon	Mount Lemmon Survey	·	1.2 km	MPC · JPL
403592	2010 PN_{77}	—	June 21, 2010	Mount Lemmon	Mount Lemmon Survey	·	1.3 km	MPC · JPL
403593	2010 PT_{79}	—	August 13, 2010	Kitt Peak	Spacewatch	·	1.2 km	MPC · JPL
403594	2010 PC_{80}	—	September 28, 2006	Kitt Peak	Spacewatch	·	1.7 km	MPC · JPL
403595	2010 QN_{2}	—	August 21, 2010	Siding Spring	SSS	·	1.7 km	MPC · JPL
403596	2010 RN_{4}	—	October 16, 2006	Kitt Peak	Spacewatch	·	1.9 km	MPC · JPL
403597	2010 RO_{5}	—	October 2, 2006	Mount Lemmon	Mount Lemmon Survey	·	1.5 km	MPC · JPL
403598	2010 RN_{7}	—	September 2, 2010	Mount Lemmon	Mount Lemmon Survey	·	1.1 km	MPC · JPL
403599	2010 RQ_{7}	—	January 10, 2008	Kitt Peak	Spacewatch	·	1.5 km	MPC · JPL
403600	2010 RM_{10}	—	September 2, 2010	Mount Lemmon	Mount Lemmon Survey	MRX	1.2 km	MPC · JPL

== 403601–403700 ==
back to top

Designation			Discovery			Properties		Ref
Permanent	Provisional	Named after	Date	Site	Discoverer(s)	Category	Diam.	Ref
403601	2010 RU_{14}	—	September 17, 2006	Catalina	CSS	EUN	1.1 km	MPC · JPL
403602	2010 RK_{29}	—	September 4, 2010	Mount Lemmon	Mount Lemmon Survey	·	1.4 km	MPC · JPL
403603	2010 RC_{37}	—	September 16, 2006	Catalina	CSS	·	1.6 km	MPC · JPL
403604	2010 RZ_{37}	—	January 5, 2003	Anderson Mesa	LONEOS	·	2.2 km	MPC · JPL
403605	2010 RL_{40}	—	March 16, 2004	Kitt Peak	Spacewatch	GAL	1.7 km	MPC · JPL
403606	2010 RL_{48}	—	September 4, 2010	Kitt Peak	Spacewatch	·	2.6 km	MPC · JPL
403607	2010 RM_{49}	—	August 30, 2005	Kitt Peak	Spacewatch	·	1.9 km	MPC · JPL
403608	2010 RC_{51}	—	September 4, 2010	Kitt Peak	Spacewatch	·	1.4 km	MPC · JPL
403609	2010 RP_{55}	—	December 18, 2007	Mount Lemmon	Mount Lemmon Survey	·	1.7 km	MPC · JPL
403610	2010 RQ_{59}	—	September 6, 2010	Kitt Peak	Spacewatch	·	1.6 km	MPC · JPL
403611	2010 RW_{81}	—	February 10, 2008	Kitt Peak	Spacewatch	·	1.6 km	MPC · JPL
403612	2010 RR_{85}	—	September 30, 2006	Mount Lemmon	Mount Lemmon Survey	·	1.4 km	MPC · JPL
403613	2010 RZ_{88}	—	October 20, 2006	Kitt Peak	Spacewatch	·	1.3 km	MPC · JPL
403614	2010 RB_{101}	—	September 10, 2010	Kitt Peak	Spacewatch	·	1.7 km	MPC · JPL
403615	2010 RJ_{101}	—	September 10, 2010	Kitt Peak	Spacewatch	TRE	2.2 km	MPC · JPL
403616	2010 RM_{101}	—	September 19, 2001	Socorro	LINEAR	·	1.4 km	MPC · JPL
403617	2010 RC_{105}	—	March 28, 2008	Mount Lemmon	Mount Lemmon Survey	·	1.4 km	MPC · JPL
403618	2010 RT_{106}	—	October 4, 2006	Mount Lemmon	Mount Lemmon Survey	·	1.5 km	MPC · JPL
403619	2010 RC_{112}	—	September 11, 2010	Kitt Peak	Spacewatch	·	1.5 km	MPC · JPL
403620	2010 RA_{121}	—	November 19, 2006	Kitt Peak	Spacewatch	HOF	1.9 km	MPC · JPL
403621	2010 RD_{127}	—	October 16, 2006	Kitt Peak	Spacewatch	·	840 m	MPC · JPL
403622	2010 RY_{127}	—	September 14, 2010	Kitt Peak	Spacewatch	·	1.8 km	MPC · JPL
403623	2010 RE_{129}	—	February 8, 2008	Kitt Peak	Spacewatch	·	2.2 km	MPC · JPL
403624	2010 RQ_{133}	—	September 24, 2006	Anderson Mesa	LONEOS	·	1.3 km	MPC · JPL
403625	2010 RB_{148}	—	October 28, 2006	Mount Lemmon	Mount Lemmon Survey	·	1.5 km	MPC · JPL
403626	2010 RQ_{157}	—	September 25, 2006	Kitt Peak	Spacewatch	EUN	1.0 km	MPC · JPL
403627	2010 RJ_{174}	—	September 8, 2010	Kitt Peak	Spacewatch	·	1.9 km	MPC · JPL
403628	2010 RC_{180}	—	November 15, 2006	Catalina	CSS	·	1.5 km	MPC · JPL
403629	2010 RP_{183}	—	February 14, 2004	Kitt Peak	Spacewatch	·	1.6 km	MPC · JPL
403630	2010 RW_{183}	—	October 1, 2005	Catalina	CSS	·	2.0 km	MPC · JPL
403631	2010 SC_{6}	—	September 16, 2010	Mount Lemmon	Mount Lemmon Survey	EOS	2.3 km	MPC · JPL
403632	2010 SJ_{9}	—	October 3, 2006	Mount Lemmon	Mount Lemmon Survey	·	1.4 km	MPC · JPL
403633	2010 ST_{11}	—	March 28, 2008	Mount Lemmon	Mount Lemmon Survey	·	1.7 km	MPC · JPL
403634	2010 SD_{18}	—	September 2, 2010	Mount Lemmon	Mount Lemmon Survey	·	1.2 km	MPC · JPL
403635	2010 SH_{19}	—	November 22, 2006	Mount Lemmon	Mount Lemmon Survey	·	1.6 km	MPC · JPL
403636	2010 SC_{20}	—	September 10, 2010	Kitt Peak	Spacewatch	·	2.0 km	MPC · JPL
403637	2010 SB_{21}	—	September 20, 2001	Kitt Peak	Spacewatch	(21344)	1.3 km	MPC · JPL
403638	2010 SH_{39}	—	September 29, 2010	Catalina	CSS	·	1.5 km	MPC · JPL
403639	2010 TG_{1}	—	March 31, 2009	Kitt Peak	Spacewatch	MIS	2.2 km	MPC · JPL
403640	2010 TS_{2}	—	September 19, 2010	Kitt Peak	Spacewatch	HOF	1.8 km	MPC · JPL
403641	2010 TC_{3}	—	September 13, 2005	Kitt Peak	Spacewatch	·	1.5 km	MPC · JPL
403642	2010 TB_{5}	—	March 28, 2009	Kitt Peak	Spacewatch	EUN	1.2 km	MPC · JPL
403643	2010 TO_{15}	—	December 27, 2006	Mount Lemmon	Mount Lemmon Survey	·	1.9 km	MPC · JPL
403644	2010 TO_{30}	—	February 9, 2008	Kitt Peak	Spacewatch	PAD	1.7 km	MPC · JPL
403645	2010 TE_{43}	—	September 14, 2010	Kitt Peak	Spacewatch	·	1.5 km	MPC · JPL
403646	2010 TP_{45}	—	September 1, 2005	Kitt Peak	Spacewatch	·	1.7 km	MPC · JPL
403647	2010 TW_{53}	—	October 8, 2010	Kitt Peak	Spacewatch	AEO	1.1 km	MPC · JPL
403648	2010 TH_{62}	—	November 22, 2006	Kitt Peak	Spacewatch	·	1.6 km	MPC · JPL
403649	2010 TP_{64}	—	October 4, 2006	Mount Lemmon	Mount Lemmon Survey	KON	3.1 km	MPC · JPL
403650	2010 TG_{71}	—	September 12, 2001	Socorro	LINEAR	·	2.0 km	MPC · JPL
403651	2010 TE_{76}	—	September 17, 2010	Kitt Peak	Spacewatch	·	1.5 km	MPC · JPL
403652	2010 TN_{78}	—	May 20, 2004	Kitt Peak	Spacewatch	AST	1.7 km	MPC · JPL
403653	2010 TG_{83}	—	August 12, 2010	Kitt Peak	Spacewatch	·	1.8 km	MPC · JPL
403654	2010 TH_{84}	—	February 9, 2008	Mount Lemmon	Mount Lemmon Survey	·	1.5 km	MPC · JPL
403655	2010 TB_{89}	—	September 30, 2010	Mount Lemmon	Mount Lemmon Survey	·	1.6 km	MPC · JPL
403656	2010 TO_{92}	—	September 2, 2010	Mount Lemmon	Mount Lemmon Survey	·	2.4 km	MPC · JPL
403657	2010 TS_{92}	—	October 23, 2006	Catalina	CSS	·	2.1 km	MPC · JPL
403658	2010 TZ_{95}	—	October 17, 2006	Mount Lemmon	Mount Lemmon Survey	·	1.4 km	MPC · JPL
403659	2010 TQ_{96}	—	March 14, 2008	Catalina	CSS	·	1.9 km	MPC · JPL
403660	2010 TS_{103}	—	February 28, 2008	Mount Lemmon	Mount Lemmon Survey	·	1.8 km	MPC · JPL
403661	2010 TL_{105}	—	March 8, 2008	Mount Lemmon	Mount Lemmon Survey	·	1.8 km	MPC · JPL
403662	2010 TB_{107}	—	October 1, 2010	Kitt Peak	Spacewatch	AST	1.5 km	MPC · JPL
403663	2010 TH_{124}	—	September 4, 2010	Kitt Peak	Spacewatch	AGN	1.1 km	MPC · JPL
403664	2010 TT_{127}	—	July 10, 2010	WISE	WISE	·	1.6 km	MPC · JPL
403665	2010 TP_{157}	—	October 18, 2006	Kitt Peak	Spacewatch	·	1.1 km	MPC · JPL
403666	2010 TP_{158}	—	October 27, 2005	Kitt Peak	Spacewatch	·	2.5 km	MPC · JPL
403667	2010 TQ_{175}	—	September 26, 2006	Catalina	CSS	·	1.3 km	MPC · JPL
403668	2010 TZ_{176}	—	June 5, 2005	Kitt Peak	Spacewatch	·	1.9 km	MPC · JPL
403669	2010 TA_{183}	—	September 16, 2010	Kitt Peak	Spacewatch	·	1.8 km	MPC · JPL
403670	2010 TT_{184}	—	December 15, 2006	Kitt Peak	Spacewatch	·	1.5 km	MPC · JPL
403671	2010 UQ_{2}	—	February 14, 1999	Kitt Peak	Spacewatch	·	1.6 km	MPC · JPL
403672	2010 UO_{11}	—	November 20, 2006	Kitt Peak	Spacewatch	·	1.5 km	MPC · JPL
403673	2010 UK_{21}	—	October 16, 2001	Kitt Peak	Spacewatch	·	1.9 km	MPC · JPL
403674	2010 UE_{23}	—	November 29, 2005	Kitt Peak	Spacewatch	·	2.7 km	MPC · JPL
403675	2010 UM_{25}	—	October 28, 2010	Kitt Peak	Spacewatch	KOR	1.5 km	MPC · JPL
403676	2010 UZ_{26}	—	December 13, 2006	Mount Lemmon	Mount Lemmon Survey	·	1.4 km	MPC · JPL
403677	2010 UB_{31}	—	October 13, 2010	Mount Lemmon	Mount Lemmon Survey	fast	2.7 km	MPC · JPL
403678	2010 UQ_{33}	—	January 17, 2007	Catalina	CSS	·	2.6 km	MPC · JPL
403679	2010 UU_{33}	—	September 20, 2001	Socorro	LINEAR	·	1.5 km	MPC · JPL
403680	2010 UB_{58}	—	March 13, 2007	Eskridge	G. Hug, D. Tibbets	·	3.5 km	MPC · JPL
403681	2010 UZ_{85}	—	October 19, 2010	Mount Lemmon	Mount Lemmon Survey	HOF	2.3 km	MPC · JPL
403682	2010 UB_{107}	—	August 30, 2005	Kitt Peak	Spacewatch	GEF	1.1 km	MPC · JPL
403683	2010 VT_{38}	—	December 17, 2006	Catalina	CSS	·	1.7 km	MPC · JPL
403684	2010 VK_{40}	—	October 11, 2010	Mount Lemmon	Mount Lemmon Survey	MRX	1.0 km	MPC · JPL
403685	2010 VY_{47}	—	November 2, 2010	Kitt Peak	Spacewatch	·	2.9 km	MPC · JPL
403686	2010 VX_{55}	—	October 30, 2005	Kitt Peak	Spacewatch	KOR	1.2 km	MPC · JPL
403687	2010 VY_{63}	—	April 5, 2008	Mount Lemmon	Mount Lemmon Survey	·	1.8 km	MPC · JPL
403688	2010 VB_{65}	—	October 30, 2010	Kitt Peak	Spacewatch	EOS	2.0 km	MPC · JPL
403689	2010 VW_{67}	—	November 16, 2006	Mount Lemmon	Mount Lemmon Survey	·	1.3 km	MPC · JPL
403690	2010 VF_{85}	—	November 1, 2010	Kitt Peak	Spacewatch	EOS	2.1 km	MPC · JPL
403691	2010 VW_{95}	—	November 29, 1997	Kitt Peak	Spacewatch	·	1.4 km	MPC · JPL
403692	2010 VY_{97}	—	April 11, 2008	Mount Lemmon	Mount Lemmon Survey	PAD	1.7 km	MPC · JPL
403693	2010 VK_{100}	—	March 4, 2008	Kitt Peak	Spacewatch	·	1.8 km	MPC · JPL
403694	2010 VG_{102}	—	September 30, 2005	Mount Lemmon	Mount Lemmon Survey	KOR	1.1 km	MPC · JPL
403695	2010 VN_{105}	—	September 10, 2004	Socorro	LINEAR	·	2.3 km	MPC · JPL
403696	2010 VQ_{105}	—	October 26, 2005	Kitt Peak	Spacewatch	KOR	1.2 km	MPC · JPL
403697	2010 VG_{113}	—	December 1, 2005	Mount Lemmon	Mount Lemmon Survey	KOR	1.4 km	MPC · JPL
403698	2010 VS_{116}	—	November 30, 2005	Kitt Peak	Spacewatch	·	2.2 km	MPC · JPL
403699	2010 VC_{118}	—	March 19, 2007	Mount Lemmon	Mount Lemmon Survey	·	2.9 km	MPC · JPL
403700	2010 VZ_{144}	—	October 17, 2010	Mount Lemmon	Mount Lemmon Survey	·	2.4 km	MPC · JPL

== 403701–403800 ==
back to top

Designation			Discovery			Properties		Ref
Permanent	Provisional	Named after	Date	Site	Discoverer(s)	Category	Diam.	Ref
403701	2010 VF_{149}	—	February 22, 2007	Kitt Peak	Spacewatch	·	2.0 km	MPC · JPL
403702	2010 VR_{150}	—	November 6, 2010	Mount Lemmon	Mount Lemmon Survey	·	2.9 km	MPC · JPL
403703	2010 VD_{157}	—	November 8, 2010	Kitt Peak	Spacewatch	·	1.5 km	MPC · JPL
403704	2010 VL_{159}	—	December 30, 2005	Kitt Peak	Spacewatch	·	3.2 km	MPC · JPL
403705	2010 VN_{166}	—	November 24, 2006	Mount Lemmon	Mount Lemmon Survey	KOR	1.6 km	MPC · JPL
403706	2010 VU_{171}	—	November 10, 2010	Mount Lemmon	Mount Lemmon Survey	·	2.9 km	MPC · JPL
403707	2010 VY_{172}	—	November 10, 2010	Mount Lemmon	Mount Lemmon Survey	·	2.9 km	MPC · JPL
403708	2010 VF_{175}	—	January 27, 2007	Mount Lemmon	Mount Lemmon Survey	KOR	1.3 km	MPC · JPL
403709	2010 VB_{185}	—	December 28, 2005	Kitt Peak	Spacewatch	·	3.5 km	MPC · JPL
403710	2010 VD_{187}	—	October 10, 2010	Mount Lemmon	Mount Lemmon Survey	·	1.6 km	MPC · JPL
403711	2010 VE_{203}	—	January 29, 1995	Kitt Peak	Spacewatch	·	1.3 km	MPC · JPL
403712	2010 VV_{203}	—	February 8, 2008	Kitt Peak	Spacewatch	·	2.3 km	MPC · JPL
403713	2010 VL_{204}	—	September 14, 2005	Kitt Peak	Spacewatch	PAD	1.8 km	MPC · JPL
403714	2010 VT_{205}	—	September 20, 1995	Kitt Peak	Spacewatch	KOR	1.2 km	MPC · JPL
403715	2010 VA_{208}	—	April 12, 2004	Kitt Peak	Spacewatch	AEO	1.3 km	MPC · JPL
403716	2010 VK_{215}	—	August 29, 2005	Kitt Peak	Spacewatch	·	1.8 km	MPC · JPL
403717	2010 VV_{219}	—	November 20, 2006	Kitt Peak	Spacewatch	·	1.6 km	MPC · JPL
403718	2010 WU_{7}	—	March 12, 2007	Kitt Peak	Spacewatch	EOS	2.0 km	MPC · JPL
403719	2010 WH_{11}	—	October 30, 2010	Mount Lemmon	Mount Lemmon Survey	·	2.8 km	MPC · JPL
403720	2010 WX_{12}	—	November 1, 2005	Mount Lemmon	Mount Lemmon Survey	KOR	1.3 km	MPC · JPL
403721	2010 WK_{24}	—	November 12, 2005	Kitt Peak	Spacewatch	KOR	1.3 km	MPC · JPL
403722	2010 WR_{26}	—	September 10, 2004	Kitt Peak	Spacewatch	·	2.0 km	MPC · JPL
403723	2010 WU_{30}	—	October 29, 2005	Mount Lemmon	Mount Lemmon Survey	·	2.3 km	MPC · JPL
403724	2010 WR_{52}	—	November 14, 1999	Socorro	LINEAR	·	2.6 km	MPC · JPL
403725	2010 WV_{53}	—	June 11, 2004	Kitt Peak	Spacewatch	·	2.0 km	MPC · JPL
403726	2010 WQ_{58}	—	November 13, 2010	Kitt Peak	Spacewatch	·	2.4 km	MPC · JPL
403727	2010 WH_{60}	—	November 3, 2010	Kitt Peak	Spacewatch	·	2.5 km	MPC · JPL
403728	2010 WR_{63}	—	September 24, 2009	Mount Lemmon	Mount Lemmon Survey	·	3.3 km	MPC · JPL
403729	2010 XU_{8}	—	January 7, 2003	Socorro	LINEAR	·	1.3 km	MPC · JPL
403730	2010 XX_{10}	—	October 16, 1977	Palomar	C. J. van Houten, I. van Houten-Groeneveld, T. Gehrels	·	1.4 km	MPC · JPL
403731	2010 XQ_{20}	—	September 13, 2004	Socorro	LINEAR	EOS	2.0 km	MPC · JPL
403732	2010 XA_{39}	—	October 3, 2005	Catalina	CSS	·	1.9 km	MPC · JPL
403733	2010 XS_{40}	—	September 18, 2009	Mount Lemmon	Mount Lemmon Survey	EOS	2.1 km	MPC · JPL
403734	2010 XB_{41}	—	September 16, 2009	Catalina	CSS	·	3.5 km	MPC · JPL
403735	2010 XE_{44}	—	October 28, 2005	Mount Lemmon	Mount Lemmon Survey	EMA	3.6 km	MPC · JPL
403736	2010 XC_{57}	—	March 31, 2008	Mount Lemmon	Mount Lemmon Survey	·	1.8 km	MPC · JPL
403737	2010 XW_{57}	—	December 7, 2005	Kitt Peak	Spacewatch	·	2.0 km	MPC · JPL
403738	2010 XU_{66}	—	December 26, 2005	Kitt Peak	Spacewatch	·	2.8 km	MPC · JPL
403739	2010 XN_{85}	—	January 27, 2007	Mount Lemmon	Mount Lemmon Survey	·	1.6 km	MPC · JPL
403740	2011 AZ	—	August 30, 2005	Kitt Peak	Spacewatch	·	1.4 km	MPC · JPL
403741	2011 AM_{5}	—	May 30, 2009	Mount Lemmon	Mount Lemmon Survey	·	2.3 km	MPC · JPL
403742	2011 AB_{13}	—	January 3, 2011	Catalina	CSS	LIX	4.7 km	MPC · JPL
403743	2011 AJ_{14}	—	September 18, 2009	Catalina	CSS	·	2.1 km	MPC · JPL
403744	2011 AJ_{16}	—	December 1, 2005	Kitt Peak	Spacewatch	·	3.6 km	MPC · JPL
403745	2011 AS_{23}	—	November 7, 2010	Mount Lemmon	Mount Lemmon Survey	·	3.5 km	MPC · JPL
403746	2011 AR_{29}	—	January 27, 2006	Mount Lemmon	Mount Lemmon Survey	·	2.8 km	MPC · JPL
403747	2011 AX_{41}	—	May 24, 2001	Kitt Peak	Spacewatch	·	5.1 km	MPC · JPL
403748	2011 AH_{42}	—	March 4, 2006	Kitt Peak	Spacewatch	·	2.7 km	MPC · JPL
403749	2011 AC_{56}	—	January 2, 2006	Catalina	CSS	·	2.6 km	MPC · JPL
403750	2011 AQ_{62}	—	January 8, 1994	Kitt Peak	Spacewatch	·	2.4 km	MPC · JPL
403751	2011 AF_{74}	—	December 11, 2004	Kitt Peak	Spacewatch	·	3.3 km	MPC · JPL
403752	2011 AH_{79}	—	September 22, 2009	Catalina	CSS	·	2.4 km	MPC · JPL
403753	2011 BS_{2}	—	January 7, 2006	Kitt Peak	Spacewatch	EOS	1.9 km	MPC · JPL
403754	2011 BE_{6}	—	November 3, 2004	Kitt Peak	Spacewatch	·	1.8 km	MPC · JPL
403755	2011 BZ_{9}	—	August 29, 2009	Kitt Peak	Spacewatch	·	2.5 km	MPC · JPL
403756	2011 BV_{13}	—	September 30, 2009	Mount Lemmon	Mount Lemmon Survey	·	2.7 km	MPC · JPL
403757	2011 BN_{28}	—	November 9, 2009	Catalina	CSS	CYB	4.7 km	MPC · JPL
403758	2011 BG_{33}	—	November 18, 1998	Kitt Peak	Spacewatch	THM	2.5 km	MPC · JPL
403759	2011 BH_{58}	—	March 2, 2006	Kitt Peak	Spacewatch	·	2.0 km	MPC · JPL
403760	2011 BY_{83}	—	September 25, 2009	Kitt Peak	Spacewatch	HYG	3.0 km	MPC · JPL
403761	2011 BR_{85}	—	September 17, 2009	Catalina	CSS	·	3.4 km	MPC · JPL
403762	2011 BX_{136}	—	October 23, 2009	Mount Lemmon	Mount Lemmon Survey	·	4.0 km	MPC · JPL
403763	2011 CE_{1}	—	October 18, 2009	Catalina	CSS	·	3.7 km	MPC · JPL
403764	2011 CH_{5}	—	October 16, 2009	Catalina	CSS	·	4.0 km	MPC · JPL
403765	2011 CE_{20}	—	September 20, 2008	Mount Lemmon	Mount Lemmon Survey	·	3.5 km	MPC · JPL
403766	2011 DA_{3}	—	March 5, 2006	Kitt Peak	Spacewatch	·	2.9 km	MPC · JPL
403767	2011 DP_{24}	—	April 2, 2006	Catalina	CSS	H	650 m	MPC · JPL
403768	2011 DF_{26}	—	January 15, 2005	Kitt Peak	Spacewatch	·	4.2 km	MPC · JPL
403769	2011 DL_{29}	—	September 17, 2009	Catalina	CSS	·	2.4 km	MPC · JPL
403770	2011 EA_{2}	—	November 18, 2009	Catalina	CSS	·	2.7 km	MPC · JPL
403771	2011 EV_{40}	—	March 9, 2011	Haleakala	Pan-STARRS 1	H	680 m	MPC · JPL
403772	2011 EY_{50}	—	February 24, 2006	Catalina	CSS	H	470 m	MPC · JPL
403773	2011 EA_{77}	—	February 24, 2006	Kitt Peak	Spacewatch	·	4.2 km	MPC · JPL
403774	2011 FO_{94}	—	March 2, 2006	Kitt Peak	Spacewatch	KOR	1.2 km	MPC · JPL
403775	2011 HS_{4}	—	April 26, 2011	Mount Lemmon	Mount Lemmon Survey	ATE · PHA	230 m	MPC · JPL
403776	2011 OV_{48}	—	September 23, 2008	Kitt Peak	Spacewatch	·	1.1 km	MPC · JPL
403777	2011 PD	—	October 9, 2005	Kitt Peak	Spacewatch	·	690 m	MPC · JPL
403778	2011 QU_{35}	—	November 10, 2005	Kitt Peak	Spacewatch	·	660 m	MPC · JPL
403779	2011 QX_{68}	—	October 22, 2005	Kitt Peak	Spacewatch	·	590 m	MPC · JPL
403780	2011 QJ_{79}	—	October 29, 2008	Kitt Peak	Spacewatch	·	590 m	MPC · JPL
403781	2011 RU_{17}	—	November 22, 2008	Kitt Peak	Spacewatch	·	680 m	MPC · JPL
403782	2011 SL_{56}	—	February 1, 2003	Kitt Peak	Spacewatch	·	590 m	MPC · JPL
403783	2011 SC_{84}	—	October 3, 2008	Mount Lemmon	Mount Lemmon Survey	·	500 m	MPC · JPL
403784	2011 SJ_{132}	—	September 23, 2011	Kitt Peak	Spacewatch	·	1.6 km	MPC · JPL
403785	2011 SK_{165}	—	September 21, 2011	Kitt Peak	Spacewatch	·	660 m	MPC · JPL
403786	2011 SS_{166}	—	September 12, 2001	Socorro	LINEAR	·	690 m	MPC · JPL
403787	2011 SE_{174}	—	September 12, 2001	Socorro	LINEAR	·	600 m	MPC · JPL
403788	2011 SU_{178}	—	September 16, 2001	Socorro	LINEAR	·	780 m	MPC · JPL
403789	2011 SL_{179}	—	September 11, 2007	Kitt Peak	Spacewatch	V	660 m	MPC · JPL
403790	2011 SO_{184}	—	November 13, 2006	Kitt Peak	Spacewatch	·	2.8 km	MPC · JPL
403791	2011 SY_{190}	—	January 7, 2005	Socorro	LINEAR	ERI	1.5 km	MPC · JPL
403792	2011 SB_{195}	—	March 3, 2006	Kitt Peak	Spacewatch	·	1.3 km	MPC · JPL
403793	2011 SG_{231}	—	October 9, 2004	Kitt Peak	Spacewatch	·	590 m	MPC · JPL
403794	2011 SB_{232}	—	January 28, 2009	Kitt Peak	Spacewatch	·	860 m	MPC · JPL
403795	2011 SR_{235}	—	June 19, 2010	Mount Lemmon	Mount Lemmon Survey	·	2.5 km	MPC · JPL
403796	2011 SH_{249}	—	January 6, 2006	Kitt Peak	Spacewatch	·	660 m	MPC · JPL
403797	2011 SX_{260}	—	September 27, 2000	Kitt Peak	Spacewatch	NYS	980 m	MPC · JPL
403798	2011 UW_{5}	—	February 1, 2009	Kitt Peak	Spacewatch	·	1.1 km	MPC · JPL
403799	2011 UR_{14}	—	October 17, 2011	Kitt Peak	Spacewatch	·	1.1 km	MPC · JPL
403800	2011 UC_{24}	—	December 25, 2005	Kitt Peak	Spacewatch	·	640 m	MPC · JPL

== 403801–403900 ==
back to top

Designation			Discovery			Properties		Ref
Permanent	Provisional	Named after	Date	Site	Discoverer(s)	Category	Diam.	Ref
403801	2011 UG_{47}	—	October 18, 2011	Kitt Peak	Spacewatch	·	900 m	MPC · JPL
403802	2011 UU_{48}	—	December 10, 2004	Kitt Peak	Spacewatch	·	870 m	MPC · JPL
403803	2011 UH_{49}	—	October 18, 2011	Kitt Peak	Spacewatch	·	840 m	MPC · JPL
403804	2011 UT_{54}	—	October 12, 2007	Mount Lemmon	Mount Lemmon Survey	V	600 m	MPC · JPL
403805	2011 UC_{57}	—	November 19, 1998	Kitt Peak	Spacewatch	·	670 m	MPC · JPL
403806	2011 UH_{64}	—	October 18, 2011	Mount Lemmon	Mount Lemmon Survey	·	1.5 km	MPC · JPL
403807	2011 UE_{76}	—	October 19, 2011	Kitt Peak	Spacewatch	·	1.4 km	MPC · JPL
403808	2011 UR_{101}	—	March 10, 2005	Mount Lemmon	Mount Lemmon Survey	·	1.0 km	MPC · JPL
403809	2011 UU_{103}	—	December 15, 2004	Kitt Peak	Spacewatch	·	830 m	MPC · JPL
403810	2011 UL_{114}	—	December 10, 2004	Socorro	LINEAR	·	1.2 km	MPC · JPL
403811	2011 UX_{116}	—	September 10, 2007	Mount Lemmon	Mount Lemmon Survey	·	1.0 km	MPC · JPL
403812	2011 UJ_{117}	—	May 7, 2006	Mount Lemmon	Mount Lemmon Survey	V	730 m	MPC · JPL
403813	2011 UO_{117}	—	July 19, 2004	Anderson Mesa	LONEOS	·	770 m	MPC · JPL
403814	2011 UJ_{124}	—	November 24, 2008	Mount Lemmon	Mount Lemmon Survey	·	540 m	MPC · JPL
403815	2011 UA_{130}	—	April 5, 2000	Socorro	LINEAR	·	1.8 km	MPC · JPL
403816	2011 UL_{133}	—	December 28, 2005	Mount Lemmon	Mount Lemmon Survey	·	630 m	MPC · JPL
403817	2011 UR_{144}	—	November 8, 2008	Mount Lemmon	Mount Lemmon Survey	·	1.1 km	MPC · JPL
403818	2011 UY_{144}	—	October 24, 2011	Catalina	CSS	·	1.1 km	MPC · JPL
403819	2011 UD_{149}	—	February 29, 2008	Mount Lemmon	Mount Lemmon Survey	·	3.1 km	MPC · JPL
403820	2011 UB_{159}	—	September 15, 2004	Kitt Peak	Spacewatch	V	550 m	MPC · JPL
403821	2011 UN_{161}	—	September 12, 2007	Catalina	CSS	·	1.3 km	MPC · JPL
403822	2011 UX_{161}	—	October 8, 2004	Kitt Peak	Spacewatch	·	730 m	MPC · JPL
403823	2011 UD_{162}	—	October 7, 2004	Socorro	LINEAR	·	650 m	MPC · JPL
403824	2011 UM_{164}	—	January 7, 2006	Kitt Peak	Spacewatch	·	710 m	MPC · JPL
403825	2011 UY_{165}	—	December 12, 2004	Kitt Peak	Spacewatch	V	800 m	MPC · JPL
403826	2011 UM_{179}	—	January 8, 2005	Campo Imperatore	CINEOS	·	1.6 km	MPC · JPL
403827	2011 UC_{183}	—	October 14, 2001	Socorro	LINEAR	·	650 m	MPC · JPL
403828	2011 UU_{185}	—	December 30, 2008	Mount Lemmon	Mount Lemmon Survey	·	690 m	MPC · JPL
403829	2011 UT_{199}	—	November 4, 2007	Kitt Peak	Spacewatch	·	1.2 km	MPC · JPL
403830	2011 UB_{210}	—	October 31, 2008	Mount Lemmon	Mount Lemmon Survey	V	760 m	MPC · JPL
403831	2011 UA_{219}	—	October 19, 2011	Mount Lemmon	Mount Lemmon Survey	·	920 m	MPC · JPL
403832	2011 UL_{237}	—	September 14, 2007	Lulin	LUSS	NYS	1.1 km	MPC · JPL
403833	2011 UD_{241}	—	September 10, 2004	Kitt Peak	Spacewatch	·	690 m	MPC · JPL
403834	2011 UW_{244}	—	January 19, 2005	Kitt Peak	Spacewatch	NYS	1.1 km	MPC · JPL
403835	2011 UW_{249}	—	April 14, 2010	Kitt Peak	Spacewatch	·	630 m	MPC · JPL
403836	2011 UM_{251}	—	December 19, 2004	Mount Lemmon	Mount Lemmon Survey	·	1.2 km	MPC · JPL
403837	2011 UR_{253}	—	May 19, 2010	Mount Lemmon	Mount Lemmon Survey	·	1.1 km	MPC · JPL
403838	2011 UC_{254}	—	January 26, 2006	Kitt Peak	Spacewatch	·	730 m	MPC · JPL
403839	2011 US_{263}	—	March 22, 2009	Mount Lemmon	Mount Lemmon Survey	·	1.9 km	MPC · JPL
403840	2011 UW_{266}	—	March 18, 2009	Catalina	CSS	·	1.0 km	MPC · JPL
403841	2011 UC_{268}	—	September 14, 2007	Kitt Peak	Spacewatch	·	990 m	MPC · JPL
403842	2011 UX_{269}	—	January 31, 2009	Mount Lemmon	Mount Lemmon Survey	V	610 m	MPC · JPL
403843	2011 UF_{278}	—	July 24, 2000	Kitt Peak	Spacewatch	·	720 m	MPC · JPL
403844	2011 UX_{282}	—	April 10, 2010	Kitt Peak	Spacewatch	·	900 m	MPC · JPL
403845	2011 UG_{283}	—	May 11, 2007	Mount Lemmon	Mount Lemmon Survey	·	760 m	MPC · JPL
403846	2011 UD_{297}	—	September 11, 2004	Kitt Peak	Spacewatch	·	570 m	MPC · JPL
403847	2011 UG_{300}	—	October 29, 2011	Kitt Peak	Spacewatch	·	1.1 km	MPC · JPL
403848	2011 UX_{300}	—	February 21, 2009	Kitt Peak	Spacewatch	·	1.3 km	MPC · JPL
403849	2011 UX_{301}	—	January 1, 2009	Mount Lemmon	Mount Lemmon Survey	·	770 m	MPC · JPL
403850	2011 UK_{310}	—	October 6, 1996	Kitt Peak	Spacewatch	·	1.2 km	MPC · JPL
403851	2011 UX_{313}	—	March 18, 2010	Kitt Peak	Spacewatch	·	750 m	MPC · JPL
403852	2011 UM_{314}	—	December 10, 2004	Kitt Peak	Spacewatch	·	910 m	MPC · JPL
403853	2011 UN_{315}	—	September 18, 2006	Catalina	CSS	AGN	1.5 km	MPC · JPL
403854	2011 UD_{318}	—	September 21, 2007	Kitt Peak	Spacewatch	·	1.3 km	MPC · JPL
403855	2011 UZ_{318}	—	September 14, 2007	Kitt Peak	Spacewatch	MAS	690 m	MPC · JPL
403856	2011 UE_{341}	—	January 19, 2005	Kitt Peak	Spacewatch	NYS	1.1 km	MPC · JPL
403857	2011 UL_{341}	—	August 27, 2001	Kitt Peak	Spacewatch	·	540 m	MPC · JPL
403858	2011 UD_{344}	—	April 14, 2005	Kitt Peak	Spacewatch	WIT	990 m	MPC · JPL
403859	2011 UY_{357}	—	May 7, 2006	Mount Lemmon	Mount Lemmon Survey	V	680 m	MPC · JPL
403860	2011 UR_{382}	—	February 18, 2004	Kitt Peak	Spacewatch	·	1.3 km	MPC · JPL
403861	2011 UT_{385}	—	December 27, 2003	Socorro	LINEAR	·	1.7 km	MPC · JPL
403862	2011 UT_{389}	—	December 31, 2008	Kitt Peak	Spacewatch	·	740 m	MPC · JPL
403863	2011 UU_{389}	—	December 9, 2004	Kitt Peak	Spacewatch	·	1.4 km	MPC · JPL
403864	2011 VQ_{11}	—	October 15, 2007	Mount Lemmon	Mount Lemmon Survey	·	1.2 km	MPC · JPL
403865	2011 VO_{13}	—	October 20, 2011	Mount Lemmon	Mount Lemmon Survey	·	1.9 km	MPC · JPL
403866	2011 VK_{16}	—	September 23, 2011	Kitt Peak	Spacewatch	·	1.2 km	MPC · JPL
403867	2011 VA_{19}	—	February 7, 2002	Kitt Peak	Spacewatch	·	640 m	MPC · JPL
403868	2011 WN_{16}	—	October 16, 2007	Catalina	CSS	·	1.4 km	MPC · JPL
403869	2011 WH_{19}	—	November 11, 1996	Kitt Peak	Spacewatch	MAS	610 m	MPC · JPL
403870	2011 WX_{24}	—	September 4, 2007	Mount Lemmon	Mount Lemmon Survey	·	1.1 km	MPC · JPL
403871	2011 WU_{25}	—	September 18, 2006	Kitt Peak	Spacewatch	·	1.6 km	MPC · JPL
403872	2011 WJ_{35}	—	October 30, 2011	Mount Lemmon	Mount Lemmon Survey	·	1.6 km	MPC · JPL
403873	2011 WN_{37}	—	March 9, 2005	Mount Lemmon	Mount Lemmon Survey	MAS	720 m	MPC · JPL
403874	2011 WD_{47}	—	November 18, 1998	Kitt Peak	Spacewatch	·	1.7 km	MPC · JPL
403875	2011 WP_{62}	—	October 23, 2011	Kitt Peak	Spacewatch	·	1.6 km	MPC · JPL
403876	2011 WH_{66}	—	September 28, 2000	Kitt Peak	Spacewatch	·	900 m	MPC · JPL
403877	2011 WN_{66}	—	December 19, 2003	Socorro	LINEAR	·	1.1 km	MPC · JPL
403878	2011 WH_{72}	—	April 26, 2006	Kitt Peak	Spacewatch	(2076)	990 m	MPC · JPL
403879	2011 WN_{72}	—	May 24, 2006	Kitt Peak	Spacewatch	·	1.2 km	MPC · JPL
403880	2011 WV_{82}	—	November 3, 2004	Kitt Peak	Spacewatch	·	860 m	MPC · JPL
403881	2011 WF_{85}	—	September 12, 2007	Mount Lemmon	Mount Lemmon Survey	·	910 m	MPC · JPL
403882	2011 WV_{90}	—	October 12, 2007	Mount Lemmon	Mount Lemmon Survey	·	1.4 km	MPC · JPL
403883	2011 WU_{96}	—	January 31, 2006	Kitt Peak	Spacewatch	·	2.0 km	MPC · JPL
403884	2011 WD_{105}	—	February 6, 2002	Socorro	LINEAR	·	3.1 km	MPC · JPL
403885	2011 WB_{106}	—	September 13, 2007	Mount Lemmon	Mount Lemmon Survey	·	930 m	MPC · JPL
403886	2011 WW_{114}	—	February 1, 2009	Kitt Peak	Spacewatch	·	940 m	MPC · JPL
403887	2011 WO_{116}	—	September 5, 1994	Kitt Peak	Spacewatch	·	1.4 km	MPC · JPL
403888	2011 WP_{116}	—	October 13, 2007	Catalina	CSS	MAS	660 m	MPC · JPL
403889	2011 WU_{117}	—	December 14, 2004	Campo Imperatore	CINEOS	·	1.1 km	MPC · JPL
403890	2011 WO_{124}	—	April 8, 2006	Kitt Peak	Spacewatch	·	1.2 km	MPC · JPL
403891	2011 WM_{131}	—	December 16, 2004	Kitt Peak	Spacewatch	·	1.0 km	MPC · JPL
403892	2011 WC_{142}	—	May 6, 2010	Mount Lemmon	Mount Lemmon Survey	·	700 m	MPC · JPL
403893	2011 WX_{144}	—	September 1, 1998	Kitt Peak	Spacewatch	·	1.4 km	MPC · JPL
403894	2011 WG_{152}	—	January 12, 2002	Kitt Peak	Spacewatch	·	790 m	MPC · JPL
403895	2011 WS_{152}	—	December 28, 2003	Kitt Peak	Spacewatch	·	990 m	MPC · JPL
403896	2011 WR_{153}	—	September 30, 2011	Mount Lemmon	Mount Lemmon Survey	·	2.3 km	MPC · JPL
403897	2011 YX	—	May 27, 2003	Kitt Peak	Spacewatch	·	3.4 km	MPC · JPL
403898	2011 YL_{2}	—	January 1, 2008	Catalina	CSS	HNS	1.8 km	MPC · JPL
403899	2011 YL_{7}	—	November 19, 2006	Catalina	CSS	(18466)	2.7 km	MPC · JPL
403900	2011 YC_{14}	—	September 30, 2006	Mount Lemmon	Mount Lemmon Survey	·	1.3 km	MPC · JPL

== 403901–404000 ==
back to top

Designation			Discovery			Properties		Ref
Permanent	Provisional	Named after	Date	Site	Discoverer(s)	Category	Diam.	Ref
403901	2011 YQ_{17}	—	November 23, 2006	Mount Lemmon	Mount Lemmon Survey	·	1.8 km	MPC · JPL
403902	2011 YU_{22}	—	November 22, 2011	Mount Lemmon	Mount Lemmon Survey	·	1.2 km	MPC · JPL
403903	2011 YV_{24}	—	December 25, 2011	Kitt Peak	Spacewatch	·	3.4 km	MPC · JPL
403904	2011 YJ_{36}	—	February 22, 2007	Catalina	CSS	·	3.0 km	MPC · JPL
403905	2011 YD_{38}	—	February 15, 2007	Catalina	CSS	·	2.4 km	MPC · JPL
403906	2011 YO_{40}	—	January 13, 2008	Kitt Peak	Spacewatch	(5)	1.2 km	MPC · JPL
403907	2011 YT_{42}	—	August 18, 2007	Anderson Mesa	LONEOS	·	690 m	MPC · JPL
403908	2011 YO_{44}	—	September 20, 1996	Kitt Peak	Spacewatch	NYS	820 m	MPC · JPL
403909	2011 YQ_{45}	—	September 12, 1994	Kitt Peak	Spacewatch	(5)	1.0 km	MPC · JPL
403910	2011 YQ_{46}	—	December 1, 1996	Kitt Peak	Spacewatch	·	2.6 km	MPC · JPL
403911	2011 YX_{47}	—	April 2, 2009	Kitt Peak	Spacewatch	·	1.3 km	MPC · JPL
403912	2011 YD_{51}	—	October 12, 2007	Mount Lemmon	Mount Lemmon Survey	NYS	1.4 km	MPC · JPL
403913	2011 YQ_{56}	—	December 29, 2011	Kitt Peak	Spacewatch	L4	8.0 km	MPC · JPL
403914	2011 YR_{59}	—	December 29, 2011	Kitt Peak	Spacewatch	·	2.1 km	MPC · JPL
403915	2011 YS_{59}	—	March 6, 2008	Catalina	CSS	·	2.6 km	MPC · JPL
403916	2011 YE_{60}	—	October 30, 2010	Mount Lemmon	Mount Lemmon Survey	·	2.1 km	MPC · JPL
403917	2011 YJ_{64}	—	February 11, 2008	Mount Lemmon	Mount Lemmon Survey	PHO	1.2 km	MPC · JPL
403918	2011 YL_{67}	—	October 4, 2006	Mount Lemmon	Mount Lemmon Survey	·	1.4 km	MPC · JPL
403919	2011 YH_{68}	—	November 18, 2006	Mount Lemmon	Mount Lemmon Survey	·	2.7 km	MPC · JPL
403920	2011 YB_{75}	—	December 31, 2011	Catalina	CSS	·	3.7 km	MPC · JPL
403921	2012 AC_{7}	—	September 16, 2006	Catalina	CSS	(1547)	2.2 km	MPC · JPL
403922	2012 AF_{8}	—	December 25, 2011	Kitt Peak	Spacewatch	NYS	1.2 km	MPC · JPL
403923	2012 AK_{9}	—	January 10, 2008	Kitt Peak	Spacewatch	EUN	1.3 km	MPC · JPL
403924	2012 AG_{13}	—	November 11, 2007	XuYi	PMO NEO Survey Program	PHO	1.1 km	MPC · JPL
403925	2012 AV_{13}	—	July 27, 2009	Kitt Peak	Spacewatch	EOS	2.2 km	MPC · JPL
403926	2012 AY_{16}	—	February 20, 2007	Siding Spring	SSS	·	4.2 km	MPC · JPL
403927	2012 AP_{17}	—	December 1, 2003	Kitt Peak	Spacewatch	·	1.2 km	MPC · JPL
403928	2012 AE_{20}	—	December 26, 2011	Kitt Peak	Spacewatch	·	2.8 km	MPC · JPL
403929	2012 BX_{3}	—	December 19, 2004	Mount Lemmon	Mount Lemmon Survey	·	770 m	MPC · JPL
403930	2012 BT_{9}	—	October 20, 2006	Catalina	CSS	·	1.8 km	MPC · JPL
403931	2012 BY_{11}	—	October 1, 2005	Mount Lemmon	Mount Lemmon Survey	AGN	1.2 km	MPC · JPL
403932	2012 BY_{15}	—	December 4, 2007	Catalina	CSS	·	1.4 km	MPC · JPL
403933	2012 BZ_{15}	—	July 5, 2010	Kitt Peak	Spacewatch	·	1.7 km	MPC · JPL
403934	2012 BN_{17}	—	September 11, 2010	Mount Lemmon	Mount Lemmon Survey	·	2.3 km	MPC · JPL
403935	2012 BR_{18}	—	March 15, 2007	Mount Lemmon	Mount Lemmon Survey	·	2.4 km	MPC · JPL
403936	2012 BE_{20}	—	November 22, 2005	Kitt Peak	Spacewatch	·	2.6 km	MPC · JPL
403937	2012 BH_{20}	—	June 5, 2005	Kitt Peak	Spacewatch	·	2.1 km	MPC · JPL
403938	2012 BS_{20}	—	December 6, 2005	Kitt Peak	Spacewatch	·	3.8 km	MPC · JPL
403939	2012 BD_{21}	—	September 21, 2001	Anderson Mesa	LONEOS	·	3.1 km	MPC · JPL
403940	2012 BH_{25}	—	November 28, 2011	Mount Lemmon	Mount Lemmon Survey	·	4.4 km	MPC · JPL
403941	2012 BY_{25}	—	February 29, 2008	Mount Lemmon	Mount Lemmon Survey	HOF	2.4 km	MPC · JPL
403942	2012 BB_{28}	—	January 21, 2012	Haleakala	Pan-STARRS 1	EOS	2.4 km	MPC · JPL
403943	2012 BJ_{28}	—	May 16, 1999	Kitt Peak	Spacewatch	·	2.8 km	MPC · JPL
403944	2012 BW_{28}	—	May 23, 2003	Kitt Peak	Spacewatch	·	2.9 km	MPC · JPL
403945	2012 BW_{30}	—	June 28, 2010	WISE	WISE	·	3.0 km	MPC · JPL
403946	2012 BU_{31}	—	August 31, 2005	Kitt Peak	Spacewatch	·	1.9 km	MPC · JPL
403947	2012 BN_{33}	—	November 2, 2006	Mount Lemmon	Mount Lemmon Survey	·	2.3 km	MPC · JPL
403948	2012 BD_{35}	—	November 18, 2006	Kitt Peak	Spacewatch	·	2.4 km	MPC · JPL
403949	2012 BS_{37}	—	September 16, 2010	Kitt Peak	Spacewatch	AST	1.5 km	MPC · JPL
403950	2012 BF_{39}	—	February 12, 2002	Kitt Peak	Spacewatch	·	2.2 km	MPC · JPL
403951	2012 BV_{39}	—	September 25, 2006	Mount Lemmon	Mount Lemmon Survey	·	1.4 km	MPC · JPL
403952	2012 BA_{45}	—	November 19, 2003	Kitt Peak	Spacewatch	·	1.2 km	MPC · JPL
403953	2012 BP_{47}	—	December 21, 2005	Catalina	CSS	·	4.7 km	MPC · JPL
403954	2012 BL_{48}	—	June 30, 2005	Kitt Peak	Spacewatch	·	2.1 km	MPC · JPL
403955	2012 BP_{48}	—	December 29, 2011	Kitt Peak	Spacewatch	HYG	2.6 km	MPC · JPL
403956	2012 BC_{52}	—	September 16, 2010	Mount Lemmon	Mount Lemmon Survey	·	1.5 km	MPC · JPL
403957	2012 BE_{52}	—	December 1, 2006	Mount Lemmon	Mount Lemmon Survey	PAD	1.8 km	MPC · JPL
403958	2012 BC_{53}	—	December 24, 2006	Mount Lemmon	Mount Lemmon Survey	TEL	1.9 km	MPC · JPL
403959	2012 BD_{53}	—	January 21, 2012	Kitt Peak	Spacewatch	EOS	1.9 km	MPC · JPL
403960	2012 BH_{55}	—	September 18, 2009	Mount Lemmon	Mount Lemmon Survey	·	3.3 km	MPC · JPL
403961	2012 BJ_{55}	—	April 1, 2008	Mount Lemmon	Mount Lemmon Survey	·	2.1 km	MPC · JPL
403962	2012 BN_{56}	—	March 26, 2008	Mount Lemmon	Mount Lemmon Survey	·	1.4 km	MPC · JPL
403963	2012 BX_{56}	—	October 7, 2010	Catalina	CSS	·	2.8 km	MPC · JPL
403964	2012 BR_{59}	—	September 12, 2005	Kitt Peak	Spacewatch	·	2.1 km	MPC · JPL
403965	2012 BA_{68}	—	February 7, 2008	Mount Lemmon	Mount Lemmon Survey	·	1.0 km	MPC · JPL
403966	2012 BC_{74}	—	February 17, 2007	Kitt Peak	Spacewatch	·	3.1 km	MPC · JPL
403967	2012 BA_{75}	—	December 27, 2011	Mount Lemmon	Mount Lemmon Survey	·	1.8 km	MPC · JPL
403968	2012 BA_{78}	—	March 12, 2008	Kitt Peak	Spacewatch	·	2.0 km	MPC · JPL
403969	2012 BT_{78}	—	March 11, 2007	Catalina	CSS	·	4.1 km	MPC · JPL
403970	2012 BY_{78}	—	March 7, 2008	Kitt Peak	Spacewatch	·	2.3 km	MPC · JPL
403971	2012 BJ_{80}	—	October 16, 2006	Kitt Peak	Spacewatch	·	1.4 km	MPC · JPL
403972	2012 BQ_{83}	—	September 12, 2007	Catalina	CSS	·	770 m	MPC · JPL
403973	2012 BV_{83}	—	October 13, 2010	Kitt Peak	Spacewatch	·	1.5 km	MPC · JPL
403974	2012 BU_{87}	—	February 8, 2008	Catalina	CSS	·	1.5 km	MPC · JPL
403975	2012 BV_{87}	—	November 28, 2006	Kitt Peak	Spacewatch	·	2.0 km	MPC · JPL
403976	2012 BJ_{93}	—	November 5, 2005	Kitt Peak	Spacewatch	·	1.4 km	MPC · JPL
403977	2012 BX_{93}	—	December 14, 2007	Mount Lemmon	Mount Lemmon Survey	NYS	1.6 km	MPC · JPL
403978	2012 BO_{100}	—	February 9, 2008	Kitt Peak	Spacewatch	·	1.5 km	MPC · JPL
403979	2012 BR_{103}	—	December 27, 1999	Kitt Peak	Spacewatch	·	3.9 km	MPC · JPL
403980	2012 BX_{103}	—	December 27, 2005	Mount Lemmon	Mount Lemmon Survey	·	3.1 km	MPC · JPL
403981	2012 BY_{103}	—	February 9, 2008	Kitt Peak	Spacewatch	EUN	1.1 km	MPC · JPL
403982	2012 BL_{104}	—	May 4, 2008	Kitt Peak	Spacewatch	·	5.2 km	MPC · JPL
403983	2012 BP_{105}	—	December 29, 2005	Kitt Peak	Spacewatch	·	4.1 km	MPC · JPL
403984	2012 BR_{106}	—	December 28, 2011	Kitt Peak	Spacewatch	URS	3.9 km	MPC · JPL
403985	2012 BG_{109}	—	February 23, 2007	Mount Lemmon	Mount Lemmon Survey	·	1.7 km	MPC · JPL
403986	2012 BO_{109}	—	April 28, 2008	Mount Lemmon	Mount Lemmon Survey	·	3.5 km	MPC · JPL
403987	2012 BD_{111}	—	October 31, 2010	Mount Lemmon	Mount Lemmon Survey	·	1.9 km	MPC · JPL
403988	2012 BW_{113}	—	October 12, 2010	Mount Lemmon	Mount Lemmon Survey	·	2.6 km	MPC · JPL
403989	2012 BR_{115}	—	January 27, 2012	Mount Lemmon	Mount Lemmon Survey	·	2.4 km	MPC · JPL
403990	2012 BK_{120}	—	August 28, 2005	Kitt Peak	Spacewatch	·	1.9 km	MPC · JPL
403991	2012 BJ_{122}	—	March 9, 2007	Kitt Peak	Spacewatch	·	1.9 km	MPC · JPL
403992	2012 BS_{122}	—	February 28, 2008	Kitt Peak	Spacewatch	·	3.1 km	MPC · JPL
403993	2012 BL_{124}	—	February 2, 2008	Mount Lemmon	Mount Lemmon Survey	·	1.4 km	MPC · JPL
403994	2012 BD_{128}	—	March 2, 2008	Mount Lemmon	Mount Lemmon Survey	·	2.2 km	MPC · JPL
403995	2012 BQ_{130}	—	December 2, 2010	Mount Lemmon	Mount Lemmon Survey	·	4.2 km	MPC · JPL
403996	2012 BU_{130}	—	November 2, 2011	Mount Lemmon	Mount Lemmon Survey	·	3.8 km	MPC · JPL
403997	2012 BX_{131}	—	July 30, 2010	WISE	WISE	URS	5.2 km	MPC · JPL
403998	2012 BD_{132}	—	June 28, 2010	WISE	WISE	DOR	3.9 km	MPC · JPL
403999	2012 BR_{136}	—	December 30, 2000	Kitt Peak	Spacewatch	·	3.0 km	MPC · JPL
404000	2012 BH_{137}	—	September 29, 2005	Kitt Peak	Spacewatch	KOR	1.3 km	MPC · JPL

back to top

== Meaning of names ==
As minor planet discoveries are confirmed, they are given a permanent number by the IAU's Minor Planet Center (MPC), and the discoverers can then submit names for them, following the IAU's naming conventions. The list below concerns those minor planets in the specified number-range that have received names, and explains the meanings of those names.

Official naming citations of newly named small Solar System bodies are approved and published in a bulletin by IAU's Working Group for Small Bodies Nomenclature (WGSBN). Before May 2021, citations were published in MPC's Minor Planet Circulars for many decades. Recent citations can also be found on the JPL Small-Body Database (SBDB). Until his death in 2016, German astronomer Lutz D. Schmadel compiled these citations into the Dictionary of Minor Planet Names (DMP) and regularly updated the collection.

Based on Paul Herget's The Names of the Minor Planets, Schmadel also researched the unclear origin of numerous asteroids, most of which had been named prior to World War II. This article incorporates text from this source, which is in the public domain: SBDB New namings may only be added to this list below after official publication as the preannouncement of names is condemned. The WGSBN publishes a comprehensive guideline for the naming rules of non-cometary small Solar System bodies.

Named minor planet	Provisional	This minor planet was named for...	Ref · Catalog
403491 Anthonygrayling	2009 UX_{73}	Anthony Clifford Grayling (b. 1949) is a British philosopher, author, humanist, and professor. He has authored over 30 books on ethics, philosophy, human rights, and other topics related to secularism.	IAU · 403491
403563 Ledbetter	2010 LY_{97}	Lilly Ledbetter (born 1938) is an American who fights for pay equity. Upon discovering she was being paid less than her male colleagues, she sued her employer (Goodyear). Her case inspired passage of the Lilly Ledbetter Fair Pay Act in 2009.	JPL · 403563
