= List of minor planets: 677001–678000 =

The following is a partial list of minor planets, running from minor-planet number 677001 through 678000, inclusive. The primary data for this and other partial lists is based on JPL's "Small-Body Orbital Elements" and data available from the Minor Planet Center. Critical list information is also provided by the MPC, unless otherwise specified from Lowell Observatory. A detailed description of the table's columns and additional sources are given on the main page including a complete list of every page in this series, and a statistical break-up on the dynamical classification of minor planets.

Also see the summary list of all named bodies in numerical and alphabetical order, and the corresponding naming citations for the number range of this particular list. New namings may only be added to this list after official publication, as the preannouncement of names is condemned by the Working Group for Small Bodies Nomenclature of the International Astronomical Union.

| Near-Earth obj. | MBA (inner) | MBA (outer) | Centaur |
| Mars-crosser | MBA (middle) | Jupiter trojan | Trans-Neptunian obj. |
| Unclassified |

== 677001–677100 ==
| Designation | | | Discovery | | | Properties | | Ref |
| Permanent | Provisional | Named after | Date | Site | Discoverer(s) | Category | Diam. | Ref |
|---|---|---|---|---|---|---|---|---|
| 677001 | 2016 QR_{86} | — | August 27, 2016 | Haleakala | Pan-STARRS 1 | · | 2.4 km | MPC · JPL |
| 677002 | 2016 QK_{88} | — | February 6, 2007 | Mount Lemmon | Mount Lemmon Survey | LIX | 2.6 km | MPC · JPL |
| 677003 | 2016 QT_{88} | — | September 13, 2007 | Catalina | CSS | · | 1.5 km | MPC · JPL |
| 677004 | 2016 QJ_{89} | — | August 30, 2016 | Haleakala | Pan-STARRS 1 | · | 2.3 km | MPC · JPL |
| 677005 | 2016 QJ_{91} | — | May 10, 2000 | Apache Point | SDSS Collaboration | · | 2.3 km | MPC · JPL |
| 677006 | 2016 QD_{93} | — | October 18, 2012 | Mount Lemmon | Mount Lemmon Survey | · | 1.2 km | MPC · JPL |
| 677007 | 2016 QU_{93} | — | June 13, 2015 | Haleakala | Pan-STARRS 1 | EOS | 1.3 km | MPC · JPL |
| 677008 | 2016 QP_{95} | — | August 30, 2016 | Mount Lemmon | Mount Lemmon Survey | · | 970 m | MPC · JPL |
| 677009 | 2016 QT_{96} | — | August 30, 2016 | Haleakala | Pan-STARRS 1 | · | 2.2 km | MPC · JPL |
| 677010 | 2016 QV_{98} | — | August 28, 2016 | Mount Lemmon | Mount Lemmon Survey | · | 2.2 km | MPC · JPL |
| 677011 | 2016 QH_{99} | — | June 19, 2009 | Kitt Peak | Spacewatch | · | 520 m | MPC · JPL |
| 677012 | 2016 QQ_{101} | — | August 26, 2016 | Haleakala | Pan-STARRS 1 | · | 2.6 km | MPC · JPL |
| 677013 | 2016 QX_{103} | — | August 30, 2016 | Mount Lemmon | Mount Lemmon Survey | · | 1.2 km | MPC · JPL |
| 677014 | 2016 QF_{104} | — | August 30, 2016 | Haleakala | Pan-STARRS 1 | · | 1.4 km | MPC · JPL |
| 677015 | 2016 QP_{105} | — | August 27, 2016 | Haleakala | Pan-STARRS 1 | · | 1.9 km | MPC · JPL |
| 677016 | 2016 QZ_{105} | — | August 28, 2016 | Mount Lemmon | Mount Lemmon Survey | · | 2.5 km | MPC · JPL |
| 677017 | 2016 QF_{106} | — | August 30, 2016 | Mount Lemmon | Mount Lemmon Survey | · | 2.6 km | MPC · JPL |
| 677018 | 2016 QH_{106} | — | August 26, 2016 | Haleakala | Pan-STARRS 1 | · | 2.6 km | MPC · JPL |
| 677019 | 2016 QT_{110} | — | August 29, 2016 | Mount Lemmon | Mount Lemmon Survey | INA | 2.1 km | MPC · JPL |
| 677020 | 2016 QY_{110} | — | August 26, 2016 | Haleakala | Pan-STARRS 1 | · | 1.9 km | MPC · JPL |
| 677021 | 2016 QL_{111} | — | August 30, 2016 | Mount Lemmon | Mount Lemmon Survey | EOS | 1.6 km | MPC · JPL |
| 677022 | 2016 QB_{113} | — | August 26, 2016 | Haleakala | Pan-STARRS 1 | EOS | 1.4 km | MPC · JPL |
| 677023 | 2016 QL_{121} | — | August 29, 2016 | Mount Lemmon | Mount Lemmon Survey | · | 590 m | MPC · JPL |
| 677024 | 2016 QE_{123} | — | August 26, 2016 | Mount Lemmon | Mount Lemmon Survey | · | 1.7 km | MPC · JPL |
| 677025 | 2016 QF_{125} | — | August 30, 2016 | Mount Lemmon | Mount Lemmon Survey | · | 1.7 km | MPC · JPL |
| 677026 | 2016 QR_{127} | — | June 21, 2010 | Mount Lemmon | Mount Lemmon Survey | VER | 2.2 km | MPC · JPL |
| 677027 | 2016 QH_{128} | — | August 30, 2016 | Haleakala | Pan-STARRS 1 | · | 2.1 km | MPC · JPL |
| 677028 | 2016 QB_{134} | — | August 29, 2016 | Mount Lemmon | Mount Lemmon Survey | · | 1.7 km | MPC · JPL |
| 677029 | 2016 QJ_{136} | — | August 28, 2016 | Mount Lemmon | Mount Lemmon Survey | · | 1.4 km | MPC · JPL |
| 677030 | 2016 QE_{141} | — | August 27, 2016 | Haleakala | Pan-STARRS 1 | EUP | 2.6 km | MPC · JPL |
| 677031 | 2016 RZ_{1} | — | March 25, 2015 | Haleakala | Pan-STARRS 1 | · | 2.7 km | MPC · JPL |
| 677032 | 2016 RA_{2} | — | January 16, 2013 | Haleakala | Pan-STARRS 1 | · | 2.2 km | MPC · JPL |
| 677033 | 2016 RQ_{4} | — | July 28, 2016 | Haleakala | Pan-STARRS 1 | EUP | 2.5 km | MPC · JPL |
| 677034 | 2016 RQ_{5} | — | September 3, 2005 | Mauna Kea | Veillet, C. | EUP | 2.6 km | MPC · JPL |
| 677035 | 2016 RT_{7} | — | December 17, 2007 | Kitt Peak | Spacewatch | · | 1.6 km | MPC · JPL |
| 677036 | 2016 RN_{8} | — | September 14, 2007 | Mount Lemmon | Mount Lemmon Survey | · | 1.8 km | MPC · JPL |
| 677037 | 2016 RW_{8} | — | December 23, 2012 | Haleakala | Pan-STARRS 1 | EOS | 1.6 km | MPC · JPL |
| 677038 | 2016 RW_{15} | — | September 28, 2001 | Palomar | NEAT | · | 3.3 km | MPC · JPL |
| 677039 | 2016 RG_{16} | — | January 17, 2013 | Kitt Peak | Spacewatch | VER | 2.5 km | MPC · JPL |
| 677040 | 2016 RD_{17} | — | March 5, 2006 | Kitt Peak | Spacewatch | HNS | 1.2 km | MPC · JPL |
| 677041 | 2016 RA_{22} | — | July 15, 2016 | Mount Lemmon | Mount Lemmon Survey | · | 1.2 km | MPC · JPL |
| 677042 | 2016 RH_{22} | — | July 28, 2005 | Palomar | NEAT | TIR | 3.2 km | MPC · JPL |
| 677043 | 2016 RM_{22} | — | April 11, 2005 | Mount Lemmon | Mount Lemmon Survey | KOR | 1.1 km | MPC · JPL |
| 677044 | 2016 RU_{22} | — | August 3, 2016 | Haleakala | Pan-STARRS 1 | · | 810 m | MPC · JPL |
| 677045 | 2016 RU_{23} | — | October 15, 2007 | Mount Lemmon | Mount Lemmon Survey | · | 1.6 km | MPC · JPL |
| 677046 | 2016 RR_{24} | — | July 15, 2016 | Mount Lemmon | Mount Lemmon Survey | T_{j} (2.98) | 2.2 km | MPC · JPL |
| 677047 | 2016 RS_{24} | — | September 27, 2010 | Kitt Peak | Spacewatch | T_{j} (2.99) · EUP | 2.7 km | MPC · JPL |
| 677048 | 2016 RX_{24} | — | July 11, 2005 | Mount Lemmon | Mount Lemmon Survey | · | 2.3 km | MPC · JPL |
| 677049 | 2016 RC_{25} | — | September 16, 2003 | Kitt Peak | Spacewatch | EUN | 1.3 km | MPC · JPL |
| 677050 | 2016 RN_{27} | — | January 17, 2013 | Haleakala | Pan-STARRS 1 | · | 2.1 km | MPC · JPL |
| 677051 | 2016 RT_{32} | — | February 14, 2005 | Kitt Peak | Spacewatch | · | 1.6 km | MPC · JPL |
| 677052 | 2016 RD_{33} | — | September 15, 2003 | Palomar | NEAT | · | 2.0 km | MPC · JPL |
| 677053 | 2016 RV_{35} | — | August 29, 2016 | Mount Lemmon | Mount Lemmon Survey | · | 2.1 km | MPC · JPL |
| 677054 | 2016 RA_{36} | — | March 21, 2015 | Haleakala | Pan-STARRS 1 | GEF | 1.0 km | MPC · JPL |
| 677055 | 2016 RQ_{38} | — | October 26, 2011 | Mayhill-ISON | L. Elenin | EOS | 1.8 km | MPC · JPL |
| 677056 | 2016 RD_{43} | — | September 2, 2016 | Mount Lemmon | Mount Lemmon Survey | · | 2.0 km | MPC · JPL |
| 677057 | 2016 RT_{43} | — | September 8, 2016 | Haleakala | Pan-STARRS 1 | · | 2.8 km | MPC · JPL |
| 677058 | 2016 RC_{44} | — | September 12, 2016 | Mount Lemmon | Mount Lemmon Survey | TIR | 2.1 km | MPC · JPL |
| 677059 | 2016 RD_{44} | — | September 2, 2016 | Mount Lemmon | Mount Lemmon Survey | (69559) | 2.0 km | MPC · JPL |
| 677060 | 2016 RO_{44} | — | September 12, 2016 | Haleakala | Pan-STARRS 1 | · | 2.2 km | MPC · JPL |
| 677061 | 2016 RZ_{44} | — | October 21, 2011 | Piszkéstető | K. Sárneczky | EOS | 1.8 km | MPC · JPL |
| 677062 | 2016 RW_{45} | — | September 2, 2016 | Mount Lemmon | Mount Lemmon Survey | · | 2.9 km | MPC · JPL |
| 677063 | 2016 RS_{46} | — | November 3, 2005 | Mount Lemmon | Mount Lemmon Survey | V | 590 m | MPC · JPL |
| 677064 | 2016 RS_{47} | — | October 29, 2005 | Palomar | NEAT | · | 2.3 km | MPC · JPL |
| 677065 | 2016 RW_{47} | — | September 6, 2016 | Mount Lemmon | Mount Lemmon Survey | · | 2.3 km | MPC · JPL |
| 677066 | 2016 RN_{48} | — | September 8, 2016 | Haleakala | Pan-STARRS 1 | · | 2.2 km | MPC · JPL |
| 677067 | 2016 RH_{49} | — | October 25, 2011 | Haleakala | Pan-STARRS 1 | · | 2.3 km | MPC · JPL |
| 677068 | 2016 RM_{49} | — | September 5, 2016 | Mount Lemmon | Mount Lemmon Survey | · | 2.4 km | MPC · JPL |
| 677069 | 2016 RD_{50} | — | June 11, 2015 | Haleakala | Pan-STARRS 1 | · | 840 m | MPC · JPL |
| 677070 | 2016 RM_{50} | — | September 6, 2016 | Mount Lemmon | Mount Lemmon Survey | · | 2.6 km | MPC · JPL |
| 677071 | 2016 RV_{50} | — | September 6, 2016 | Mount Lemmon | Mount Lemmon Survey | · | 2.5 km | MPC · JPL |
| 677072 | 2016 RC_{51} | — | September 12, 2016 | Haleakala | Pan-STARRS 1 | · | 1.9 km | MPC · JPL |
| 677073 | 2016 RX_{51} | — | October 25, 2005 | Mount Lemmon | Mount Lemmon Survey | · | 1.9 km | MPC · JPL |
| 677074 | 2016 RY_{57} | — | September 10, 2016 | Mount Lemmon | Mount Lemmon Survey | · | 1.5 km | MPC · JPL |
| 677075 | 2016 RQ_{59} | — | September 11, 2016 | Mount Lemmon | Mount Lemmon Survey | · | 2.0 km | MPC · JPL |
| 677076 | 2016 RL_{60} | — | September 5, 2016 | Mount Lemmon | Mount Lemmon Survey | TEL | 1.2 km | MPC · JPL |
| 677077 | 2016 RX_{60} | — | September 5, 2016 | Mount Lemmon | Mount Lemmon Survey | · | 2.4 km | MPC · JPL |
| 677078 | 2016 RD_{62} | — | September 23, 2011 | Kitt Peak | Spacewatch | EOS | 1.5 km | MPC · JPL |
| 677079 | 2016 RL_{67} | — | September 10, 2016 | Mount Lemmon | Mount Lemmon Survey | · | 1.2 km | MPC · JPL |
| 677080 | 2016 RO_{67} | — | September 26, 2011 | Modra | Gajdoš, S. | EOS | 1.7 km | MPC · JPL |
| 677081 | 2016 RL_{69} | — | September 5, 2016 | Mount Lemmon | Mount Lemmon Survey | EOS | 1.6 km | MPC · JPL |
| 677082 | 2016 RJ_{70} | — | September 11, 2016 | Mount Lemmon | Mount Lemmon Survey | · | 1.1 km | MPC · JPL |
| 677083 | 2016 RV_{73} | — | September 12, 2016 | Haleakala | Pan-STARRS 1 | · | 2.4 km | MPC · JPL |
| 677084 | 2016 RF_{76} | — | September 10, 2016 | Mount Lemmon | Mount Lemmon Survey | ELF | 2.7 km | MPC · JPL |
| 677085 | 2016 RX_{76} | — | September 12, 2016 | Haleakala | Pan-STARRS 1 | · | 2.2 km | MPC · JPL |
| 677086 | 2016 RY_{76} | — | September 12, 2016 | Haleakala | Pan-STARRS 1 | EOS | 1.6 km | MPC · JPL |
| 677087 | 2016 RM_{79} | — | September 8, 2016 | Haleakala | Pan-STARRS 1 | EOS | 1.5 km | MPC · JPL |
| 677088 | 2016 RA_{81} | — | September 12, 2016 | Mount Lemmon | Mount Lemmon Survey | · | 1.4 km | MPC · JPL |
| 677089 | 2016 RQ_{92} | — | September 12, 2016 | Mount Lemmon | Mount Lemmon Survey | · | 2.3 km | MPC · JPL |
| 677090 | 2016 SA_{1} | — | March 31, 2003 | Palomar | NEAT | · | 1.2 km | MPC · JPL |
| 677091 | 2016 SH_{6} | — | November 1, 2011 | Mount Lemmon | Mount Lemmon Survey | TIR | 1.9 km | MPC · JPL |
| 677092 | 2016 SP_{6} | — | September 22, 2016 | Mount Lemmon | Mount Lemmon Survey | · | 1.9 km | MPC · JPL |
| 677093 | 2016 SR_{6} | — | September 4, 2016 | Mount Lemmon | Mount Lemmon Survey | · | 1.4 km | MPC · JPL |
| 677094 | 2016 ST_{8} | — | July 13, 2016 | Mount Lemmon | Mount Lemmon Survey | · | 720 m | MPC · JPL |
| 677095 | 2016 SS_{12} | — | September 2, 2010 | Mount Lemmon | Mount Lemmon Survey | THB | 2.2 km | MPC · JPL |
| 677096 | 2016 SD_{13} | — | September 1, 2005 | Palomar | NEAT | LIX | 2.7 km | MPC · JPL |
| 677097 | 2016 SL_{14} | — | August 28, 2016 | Mount Lemmon | Mount Lemmon Survey | · | 2.4 km | MPC · JPL |
| 677098 | 2016 ST_{14} | — | March 21, 2001 | Kitt Peak | SKADS | MIS | 2.4 km | MPC · JPL |
| 677099 | 2016 SB_{15} | — | August 28, 2005 | Kitt Peak | Spacewatch | THM | 2.3 km | MPC · JPL |
| 677100 | 2016 SU_{15} | — | August 10, 2016 | Haleakala | Pan-STARRS 1 | · | 2.4 km | MPC · JPL |

== 677101–677200 ==
back to top

| Designation | | | Discovery | | | Properties | | Ref |
| Permanent | Provisional | Named after | Date | Site | Discoverer(s) | Category | Diam. | Ref |
|---|---|---|---|---|---|---|---|---|
| 677101 | 2016 SB_{20} | — | March 10, 2007 | Mount Lemmon | Mount Lemmon Survey | · | 1.2 km | MPC · JPL |
| 677102 | 2016 SP_{20} | — | February 27, 2014 | Haleakala | Pan-STARRS 1 | · | 2.2 km | MPC · JPL |
| 677103 | 2016 SK_{21} | — | December 6, 2005 | Kitt Peak | Spacewatch | fast | 990 m | MPC · JPL |
| 677104 | 2016 SR_{21} | — | September 27, 2016 | Haleakala | Pan-STARRS 1 | · | 1.7 km | MPC · JPL |
| 677105 | 2016 SU_{22} | — | October 18, 2007 | Kitt Peak | Spacewatch | · | 1.4 km | MPC · JPL |
| 677106 | 2016 SB_{23} | — | February 23, 2001 | Cerro Tololo | Deep Lens Survey | · | 1.2 km | MPC · JPL |
| 677107 | 2016 SA_{24} | — | September 24, 2005 | Kitt Peak | Spacewatch | · | 2.1 km | MPC · JPL |
| 677108 | 2016 SY_{24} | — | July 12, 2005 | Mount Lemmon | Mount Lemmon Survey | · | 2.1 km | MPC · JPL |
| 677109 | 2016 SK_{26} | — | February 16, 2010 | Mount Lemmon | Mount Lemmon Survey | NYS | 1.0 km | MPC · JPL |
| 677110 | 2016 SL_{27} | — | March 13, 2010 | Kitt Peak | Spacewatch | · | 1.6 km | MPC · JPL |
| 677111 | 2016 SW_{29} | — | September 24, 2005 | Kitt Peak | Spacewatch | · | 1.9 km | MPC · JPL |
| 677112 | 2016 SQ_{30} | — | April 20, 2013 | Mount Lemmon | Mount Lemmon Survey | · | 2.9 km | MPC · JPL |
| 677113 | 2016 SN_{31} | — | August 17, 2012 | ESA OGS | ESA OGS | NYS | 1.1 km | MPC · JPL |
| 677114 | 2016 SP_{32} | — | August 2, 2016 | Haleakala | Pan-STARRS 1 | · | 1.6 km | MPC · JPL |
| 677115 | 2016 SU_{33} | — | October 21, 2011 | Piszkéstető | K. Sárneczky | · | 1.6 km | MPC · JPL |
| 677116 | 2016 SY_{35} | — | April 25, 2007 | Kitt Peak | Spacewatch | · | 1.4 km | MPC · JPL |
| 677117 | 2016 SZ_{37} | — | October 7, 2012 | Kitt Peak | Spacewatch | · | 1.3 km | MPC · JPL |
| 677118 | 2016 SA_{38} | — | August 30, 2016 | Mount Lemmon | Mount Lemmon Survey | AGN | 1.2 km | MPC · JPL |
| 677119 | 2016 SF_{38} | — | August 15, 2016 | Haleakala | Pan-STARRS 1 | · | 2.9 km | MPC · JPL |
| 677120 | 2016 SN_{40} | — | May 21, 2015 | Haleakala | Pan-STARRS 1 | · | 1.7 km | MPC · JPL |
| 677121 | 2016 ST_{40} | — | October 12, 2005 | Kitt Peak | Spacewatch | THM | 2.1 km | MPC · JPL |
| 677122 | 2016 SF_{42} | — | September 3, 2016 | Mount Lemmon | Mount Lemmon Survey | · | 1.9 km | MPC · JPL |
| 677123 | 2016 SH_{44} | — | February 15, 2013 | Haleakala | Pan-STARRS 1 | · | 2.2 km | MPC · JPL |
| 677124 | 2016 SS_{47} | — | September 25, 2016 | Haleakala | Pan-STARRS 1 | · | 3.0 km | MPC · JPL |
| 677125 | 2016 SU_{47} | — | September 30, 2005 | Mount Lemmon | Mount Lemmon Survey | THM | 1.8 km | MPC · JPL |
| 677126 | 2016 SE_{48} | — | September 26, 2016 | Haleakala | Pan-STARRS 1 | · | 2.7 km | MPC · JPL |
| 677127 | 2016 SJ_{48} | — | September 24, 2005 | Kitt Peak | Spacewatch | · | 2.2 km | MPC · JPL |
| 677128 | 2016 SN_{48} | — | September 27, 2016 | Haleakala | Pan-STARRS 1 | · | 2.7 km | MPC · JPL |
| 677129 | 2016 SP_{48} | — | August 2, 2016 | Haleakala | Pan-STARRS 1 | T_{j} (2.96) | 3.5 km | MPC · JPL |
| 677130 | 2016 ST_{48} | — | October 10, 2005 | Kitt Peak | Spacewatch | · | 1.8 km | MPC · JPL |
| 677131 | 2016 SL_{49} | — | November 13, 2007 | Mount Lemmon | Mount Lemmon Survey | BRA | 1.5 km | MPC · JPL |
| 677132 | 2016 SN_{49} | — | October 10, 2007 | Mount Lemmon | Mount Lemmon Survey | AEO | 1.1 km | MPC · JPL |
| 677133 | 2016 SP_{49} | — | August 18, 2011 | Haleakala | Pan-STARRS 1 | · | 1.8 km | MPC · JPL |
| 677134 | 2016 SM_{50} | — | May 2, 2014 | Mount Lemmon | Mount Lemmon Survey | · | 2.4 km | MPC · JPL |
| 677135 | 2016 SL_{51} | — | March 28, 2014 | Mount Lemmon | Mount Lemmon Survey | · | 1.3 km | MPC · JPL |
| 677136 | 2016 SB_{52} | — | September 27, 2016 | Haleakala | Pan-STARRS 1 | · | 2.3 km | MPC · JPL |
| 677137 | 2016 SE_{52} | — | October 24, 2011 | Kitt Peak | Spacewatch | · | 1.9 km | MPC · JPL |
| 677138 | 2016 SH_{52} | — | November 24, 2011 | Haleakala | Pan-STARRS 1 | HYG | 2.0 km | MPC · JPL |
| 677139 | 2016 SG_{53} | — | January 24, 2007 | Mount Lemmon | Mount Lemmon Survey | · | 1.9 km | MPC · JPL |
| 677140 | 2016 SV_{54} | — | October 22, 2006 | Kitt Peak | Spacewatch | · | 1.7 km | MPC · JPL |
| 677141 | 2016 SC_{55} | — | April 14, 2008 | Mount Lemmon | Mount Lemmon Survey | · | 3.1 km | MPC · JPL |
| 677142 | 2016 SZ_{64} | — | October 1, 2006 | Kitt Peak | Spacewatch | · | 1.9 km | MPC · JPL |
| 677143 | 2016 SA_{71} | — | September 22, 2016 | Haleakala | Pan-STARRS 1 | · | 860 m | MPC · JPL |
| 677144 | 2016 SU_{71} | — | October 25, 2005 | Kitt Peak | Spacewatch | · | 2.0 km | MPC · JPL |
| 677145 | 2016 SC_{73} | — | September 30, 2016 | Haleakala | Pan-STARRS 1 | · | 2.3 km | MPC · JPL |
| 677146 | 2016 SZ_{73} | — | September 26, 2016 | Haleakala | Pan-STARRS 1 | THM | 2.0 km | MPC · JPL |
| 677147 | 2016 SQ_{74} | — | September 25, 2016 | Mount Lemmon | Mount Lemmon Survey | · | 2.2 km | MPC · JPL |
| 677148 | 2016 SO_{75} | — | September 29, 2011 | Mount Lemmon | Mount Lemmon Survey | EOS | 1.8 km | MPC · JPL |
| 677149 | 2016 SV_{75} | — | September 27, 2016 | Haleakala | Pan-STARRS 1 | · | 2.1 km | MPC · JPL |
| 677150 | 2016 SE_{76} | — | September 25, 2016 | Haleakala | Pan-STARRS 1 | · | 2.1 km | MPC · JPL |
| 677151 | 2016 SF_{76} | — | September 25, 2016 | Mount Lemmon | Mount Lemmon Survey | · | 2.3 km | MPC · JPL |
| 677152 | 2016 SK_{76} | — | September 22, 2016 | Mount Lemmon | Mount Lemmon Survey | · | 2.4 km | MPC · JPL |
| 677153 | 2016 SW_{76} | — | September 27, 2016 | Haleakala | Pan-STARRS 1 | · | 1.6 km | MPC · JPL |
| 677154 | 2016 SM_{81} | — | September 27, 2016 | Haleakala | Pan-STARRS 1 | · | 2.0 km | MPC · JPL |
| 677155 | 2016 SW_{82} | — | September 26, 2016 | Haleakala | Pan-STARRS 1 | · | 1.8 km | MPC · JPL |
| 677156 | 2016 SO_{88} | — | September 25, 2016 | Mount Lemmon | Mount Lemmon Survey | · | 760 m | MPC · JPL |
| 677157 | 2016 SP_{88} | — | September 25, 2016 | Mount Lemmon | Mount Lemmon Survey | · | 2.1 km | MPC · JPL |
| 677158 | 2016 SN_{92} | — | September 27, 2016 | Haleakala | Pan-STARRS 1 | · | 2.2 km | MPC · JPL |
| 677159 | 2016 SZ_{96} | — | September 27, 2016 | Haleakala | Pan-STARRS 1 | · | 2.0 km | MPC · JPL |
| 677160 | 2016 SK_{99} | — | December 4, 2007 | Mount Lemmon | Mount Lemmon Survey | KOR | 1.2 km | MPC · JPL |
| 677161 | 2016 SP_{99} | — | September 25, 2016 | Haleakala | Pan-STARRS 1 | EOS | 1.4 km | MPC · JPL |
| 677162 | 2016 SY_{100} | — | June 18, 2015 | Haleakala | Pan-STARRS 1 | · | 1.7 km | MPC · JPL |
| 677163 | 2016 SE_{102} | — | September 26, 2016 | Haleakala | Pan-STARRS 1 | · | 2.5 km | MPC · JPL |
| 677164 | 2016 SL_{102} | — | September 25, 2016 | Mount Lemmon | Mount Lemmon Survey | · | 2.5 km | MPC · JPL |
| 677165 | 2016 SL_{103} | — | September 25, 2016 | Mount Lemmon | Mount Lemmon Survey | · | 1.4 km | MPC · JPL |
| 677166 | 2016 SL_{115} | — | September 30, 2016 | Haleakala | Pan-STARRS 1 | · | 2.8 km | MPC · JPL |
| 677167 | 2016 TT_{1} | — | October 1, 2016 | Mount Lemmon | Mount Lemmon Survey | · | 1.5 km | MPC · JPL |
| 677168 | 2016 TJ_{3} | — | October 8, 2007 | Mount Lemmon | Mount Lemmon Survey | · | 1.6 km | MPC · JPL |
| 677169 | 2016 TK_{3} | — | October 4, 2004 | Kitt Peak | Spacewatch | · | 700 m | MPC · JPL |
| 677170 | 2016 TB_{4} | — | September 13, 2007 | Mount Lemmon | Mount Lemmon Survey | · | 1.4 km | MPC · JPL |
| 677171 | 2016 TJ_{5} | — | February 8, 2013 | Haleakala | Pan-STARRS 1 | · | 2.6 km | MPC · JPL |
| 677172 | 2016 TO_{5} | — | February 11, 2004 | Kitt Peak | Spacewatch | AGN | 1.2 km | MPC · JPL |
| 677173 | 2016 TD_{8} | — | August 31, 2005 | Palomar | NEAT | · | 1.7 km | MPC · JPL |
| 677174 | 2016 TE_{8} | — | July 8, 2016 | Haleakala | Pan-STARRS 1 | · | 1.6 km | MPC · JPL |
| 677175 | 2016 TL_{9} | — | September 24, 2011 | Mayhill-ISON | L. Elenin | · | 1.9 km | MPC · JPL |
| 677176 | 2016 TZ_{11} | — | August 28, 1995 | Kitt Peak | Spacewatch | · | 1.7 km | MPC · JPL |
| 677177 | 2016 TE_{12} | — | October 10, 2012 | Mount Lemmon | Mount Lemmon Survey | EUN | 1.4 km | MPC · JPL |
| 677178 | 2016 TF_{13} | — | November 3, 2005 | Catalina | CSS | T_{j} (2.98) | 2.8 km | MPC · JPL |
| 677179 | 2016 TG_{13} | — | November 23, 2006 | Vallemare Borbona | V. S. Casulli | TEL | 1.2 km | MPC · JPL |
| 677180 | 2016 TR_{14} | — | November 4, 2005 | Mount Lemmon | Mount Lemmon Survey | · | 1.4 km | MPC · JPL |
| 677181 | 2016 TU_{16} | — | October 5, 2016 | Mount Lemmon | Mount Lemmon Survey | EOS | 1.4 km | MPC · JPL |
| 677182 | 2016 TE_{17} | — | October 24, 2012 | Piszkés-tető | K. Sárneczky, G. Hodosán | · | 1.3 km | MPC · JPL |
| 677183 | 2016 TO_{21} | — | September 11, 2007 | Kitt Peak | Spacewatch | · | 2.3 km | MPC · JPL |
| 677184 | 2016 TU_{21} | — | March 25, 2015 | Haleakala | Pan-STARRS 1 | PHO | 750 m | MPC · JPL |
| 677185 | 2016 TW_{21} | — | July 29, 2005 | Palomar | NEAT | · | 1.1 km | MPC · JPL |
| 677186 | 2016 TZ_{21} | — | February 1, 2009 | Kitt Peak | Spacewatch | · | 1.6 km | MPC · JPL |
| 677187 | 2016 TX_{23} | — | January 26, 2015 | Haleakala | Pan-STARRS 1 | · | 1.9 km | MPC · JPL |
| 677188 | 2016 TD_{24} | — | August 10, 2016 | Haleakala | Pan-STARRS 1 | · | 580 m | MPC · JPL |
| 677189 | 2016 TO_{24} | — | September 3, 2005 | Mauna Kea | Veillet, C. | · | 1.1 km | MPC · JPL |
| 677190 | 2016 TV_{24} | — | July 19, 2015 | Haleakala | Pan-STARRS 1 | GEF | 1.4 km | MPC · JPL |
| 677191 | 2016 TO_{25} | — | October 4, 2003 | Kitt Peak | Spacewatch | EUN | 1.4 km | MPC · JPL |
| 677192 | 2016 TF_{26} | — | December 5, 2013 | Haleakala | Pan-STARRS 1 | BRA | 1.5 km | MPC · JPL |
| 677193 | 2016 TM_{26} | — | December 23, 2012 | Haleakala | Pan-STARRS 1 | · | 1.6 km | MPC · JPL |
| 677194 | 2016 TQ_{26} | — | October 5, 2016 | Mount Lemmon | Mount Lemmon Survey | · | 2.8 km | MPC · JPL |
| 677195 | 2016 TH_{27} | — | July 11, 2016 | Mount Lemmon | Mount Lemmon Survey | · | 3.2 km | MPC · JPL |
| 677196 | 2016 TG_{32} | — | April 27, 2011 | Haleakala | Pan-STARRS 1 | · | 1.3 km | MPC · JPL |
| 677197 | 2016 TE_{33} | — | September 6, 2016 | Mount Lemmon | Mount Lemmon Survey | · | 2.3 km | MPC · JPL |
| 677198 | 2016 TS_{34} | — | January 31, 2015 | Haleakala | Pan-STARRS 1 | · | 1.6 km | MPC · JPL |
| 677199 | 2016 TT_{34} | — | September 12, 2016 | Haleakala | Pan-STARRS 1 | EOS | 1.5 km | MPC · JPL |
| 677200 | 2016 TA_{35} | — | July 3, 2011 | Mount Lemmon | Mount Lemmon Survey | · | 1.6 km | MPC · JPL |

== 677201–677300 ==
back to top

| Designation | | | Discovery | | | Properties | | Ref |
| Permanent | Provisional | Named after | Date | Site | Discoverer(s) | Category | Diam. | Ref |
|---|---|---|---|---|---|---|---|---|
| 677201 | 2016 TK_{35} | — | September 12, 2016 | Haleakala | Pan-STARRS 1 | EOS | 1.5 km | MPC · JPL |
| 677202 | 2016 TP_{35} | — | October 6, 2016 | Haleakala | Pan-STARRS 1 | · | 2.4 km | MPC · JPL |
| 677203 | 2016 TH_{36} | — | February 11, 2008 | Mount Lemmon | Mount Lemmon Survey | EOS | 1.4 km | MPC · JPL |
| 677204 | 2016 TD_{39} | — | October 21, 2011 | Mount Lemmon | Mount Lemmon Survey | · | 1.4 km | MPC · JPL |
| 677205 | 2016 TG_{40} | — | January 2, 2009 | Mount Lemmon | Mount Lemmon Survey | · | 1.6 km | MPC · JPL |
| 677206 | 2016 TK_{42} | — | September 30, 2005 | Mount Lemmon | Mount Lemmon Survey | · | 1.9 km | MPC · JPL |
| 677207 | 2016 TH_{46} | — | September 25, 2016 | Mount Lemmon | Mount Lemmon Survey | · | 540 m | MPC · JPL |
| 677208 | 2016 TM_{46} | — | October 7, 2016 | Mount Lemmon | Mount Lemmon Survey | · | 970 m | MPC · JPL |
| 677209 | 2016 TS_{46} | — | November 2, 2007 | Kitt Peak | Spacewatch | · | 2.1 km | MPC · JPL |
| 677210 | 2016 TV_{46} | — | June 18, 2015 | Haleakala | Pan-STARRS 1 | · | 1.6 km | MPC · JPL |
| 677211 | 2016 TO_{49} | — | March 21, 2015 | Haleakala | Pan-STARRS 1 | · | 620 m | MPC · JPL |
| 677212 | 2016 TS_{49} | — | August 29, 2016 | Mount Lemmon | Mount Lemmon Survey | · | 790 m | MPC · JPL |
| 677213 | 2016 TX_{49} | — | October 7, 2016 | Haleakala | Pan-STARRS 1 | · | 1.6 km | MPC · JPL |
| 677214 | 2016 TC_{50} | — | May 8, 2014 | Haleakala | Pan-STARRS 1 | EOS | 1.5 km | MPC · JPL |
| 677215 | 2016 TK_{50} | — | October 7, 2016 | Haleakala | Pan-STARRS 1 | EOS | 1.5 km | MPC · JPL |
| 677216 | 2016 TA_{53} | — | February 9, 2014 | Haleakala | Pan-STARRS 1 | · | 1.5 km | MPC · JPL |
| 677217 | 2016 TF_{53} | — | September 22, 2016 | Mount Lemmon | Mount Lemmon Survey | · | 1.9 km | MPC · JPL |
| 677218 | 2016 TQ_{53} | — | September 5, 2010 | Mount Lemmon | Mount Lemmon Survey | · | 2.7 km | MPC · JPL |
| 677219 | 2016 TR_{53} | — | September 2, 2010 | Mount Lemmon | Mount Lemmon Survey | EOS | 1.4 km | MPC · JPL |
| 677220 | 2016 TT_{53} | — | July 6, 2010 | Kitt Peak | Spacewatch | · | 2.4 km | MPC · JPL |
| 677221 | 2016 TV_{55} | — | March 28, 2015 | Kitt Peak | Spacewatch | · | 1.5 km | MPC · JPL |
| 677222 | 2016 TY_{56} | — | December 18, 2001 | Palomar | NEAT | · | 1.3 km | MPC · JPL |
| 677223 | 2016 TE_{59} | — | October 22, 2011 | Mount Lemmon | Mount Lemmon Survey | EOS | 1.6 km | MPC · JPL |
| 677224 | 2016 TN_{60} | — | October 9, 2005 | Kitt Peak | Spacewatch | · | 1.8 km | MPC · JPL |
| 677225 | 2016 TO_{60} | — | August 10, 2016 | Haleakala | Pan-STARRS 1 | · | 2.5 km | MPC · JPL |
| 677226 | 2016 TJ_{62} | — | December 31, 2013 | Mount Lemmon | Mount Lemmon Survey | · | 470 m | MPC · JPL |
| 677227 | 2016 TO_{62} | — | September 24, 2011 | Mount Lemmon | Mount Lemmon Survey | · | 1.8 km | MPC · JPL |
| 677228 | 2016 TY_{62} | — | September 26, 2011 | Mount Lemmon | Mount Lemmon Survey | · | 1.9 km | MPC · JPL |
| 677229 | 2016 TL_{64} | — | October 12, 2007 | Mount Lemmon | Mount Lemmon Survey | · | 1.9 km | MPC · JPL |
| 677230 | 2016 TQ_{64} | — | June 30, 2005 | Kitt Peak | Spacewatch | · | 1.6 km | MPC · JPL |
| 677231 | 2016 TK_{65} | — | October 4, 2007 | Mount Lemmon | Mount Lemmon Survey | · | 1.2 km | MPC · JPL |
| 677232 | 2016 TC_{66} | — | November 3, 2011 | Mount Lemmon | Mount Lemmon Survey | · | 2.3 km | MPC · JPL |
| 677233 | 2016 TR_{66} | — | December 30, 2007 | Kitt Peak | Spacewatch | NAE | 2.3 km | MPC · JPL |
| 677234 | 2016 TX_{69} | — | September 8, 2016 | Haleakala | Pan-STARRS 1 | · | 2.7 km | MPC · JPL |
| 677235 | 2016 TJ_{70} | — | October 11, 2006 | Kitt Peak | Spacewatch | KOR | 1.2 km | MPC · JPL |
| 677236 | 2016 TD_{71} | — | September 10, 2016 | Mount Lemmon | Mount Lemmon Survey | · | 2.0 km | MPC · JPL |
| 677237 | 2016 TA_{72} | — | October 9, 2016 | Haleakala | Pan-STARRS 1 | · | 1.7 km | MPC · JPL |
| 677238 | 2016 TT_{74} | — | January 7, 2006 | Kitt Peak | Spacewatch | · | 970 m | MPC · JPL |
| 677239 | 2016 TY_{75} | — | August 2, 2016 | Haleakala | Pan-STARRS 1 | (2076) | 650 m | MPC · JPL |
| 677240 | 2016 TF_{76} | — | October 4, 2016 | Mount Lemmon | Mount Lemmon Survey | · | 540 m | MPC · JPL |
| 677241 | 2016 TQ_{76} | — | December 25, 2011 | Mount Lemmon | Mount Lemmon Survey | · | 2.2 km | MPC · JPL |
| 677242 | 2016 TM_{77} | — | September 16, 2003 | Palomar | NEAT | · | 1.4 km | MPC · JPL |
| 677243 | 2016 TS_{78} | — | October 28, 2008 | Mount Lemmon | Mount Lemmon Survey | · | 1.1 km | MPC · JPL |
| 677244 | 2016 TZ_{79} | — | May 22, 2015 | Haleakala | Pan-STARRS 1 | · | 1.3 km | MPC · JPL |
| 677245 | 2016 TG_{81} | — | September 30, 2003 | Kitt Peak | Spacewatch | · | 1.7 km | MPC · JPL |
| 677246 | 2016 TB_{84} | — | October 20, 2011 | Kitt Peak | Spacewatch | · | 2.0 km | MPC · JPL |
| 677247 | 2016 TR_{84} | — | September 3, 2016 | Mount Lemmon | Mount Lemmon Survey | · | 2.8 km | MPC · JPL |
| 677248 | 2016 TU_{85} | — | November 19, 2003 | Kitt Peak | Spacewatch | · | 1.8 km | MPC · JPL |
| 677249 | 2016 TO_{86} | — | October 20, 2007 | Mount Lemmon | Mount Lemmon Survey | · | 1.8 km | MPC · JPL |
| 677250 | 2016 TQ_{86} | — | August 29, 2016 | Mount Lemmon | Mount Lemmon Survey | · | 1.1 km | MPC · JPL |
| 677251 | 2016 TZ_{86} | — | October 10, 2016 | Mount Lemmon | Mount Lemmon Survey | · | 2.7 km | MPC · JPL |
| 677252 | 2016 TH_{91} | — | August 27, 2011 | Mayhill-ISON | L. Elenin | · | 1.6 km | MPC · JPL |
| 677253 | 2016 TL_{91} | — | November 26, 2012 | Mount Lemmon | Mount Lemmon Survey | · | 1.6 km | MPC · JPL |
| 677254 | 2016 TV_{96} | — | December 17, 2012 | Nogales | M. Schwartz, P. R. Holvorcem | EUN | 1.2 km | MPC · JPL |
| 677255 | 2016 TM_{97} | — | December 10, 2012 | Kitt Peak | Spacewatch | · | 1.8 km | MPC · JPL |
| 677256 | 2016 TQ_{97} | — | August 3, 2015 | Haleakala | Pan-STARRS 1 | EOS | 1.5 km | MPC · JPL |
| 677257 | 2016 TV_{97} | — | October 1, 2016 | Mount Lemmon | Mount Lemmon Survey | · | 3.3 km | MPC · JPL |
| 677258 | 2016 TV_{98} | — | October 31, 2011 | Mount Lemmon | Mount Lemmon Survey | · | 1.7 km | MPC · JPL |
| 677259 | 2016 TA_{100} | — | April 9, 2014 | Mount Lemmon | Mount Lemmon Survey | · | 1.9 km | MPC · JPL |
| 677260 | 2016 TD_{100} | — | August 27, 2005 | Palomar | NEAT | · | 2.0 km | MPC · JPL |
| 677261 | 2016 TK_{100} | — | October 10, 2016 | Mount Lemmon | Mount Lemmon Survey | EOS | 1.3 km | MPC · JPL |
| 677262 | 2016 TL_{100} | — | February 21, 2009 | Catalina | CSS | HNS | 1.4 km | MPC · JPL |
| 677263 | 2016 TR_{100} | — | October 7, 2016 | Haleakala | Pan-STARRS 1 | GEF | 980 m | MPC · JPL |
| 677264 | 2016 TW_{100} | — | October 10, 2016 | Haleakala | Pan-STARRS 1 | EUP | 2.7 km | MPC · JPL |
| 677265 | 2016 TD_{101} | — | September 5, 2016 | Mount Lemmon | Mount Lemmon Survey | EOS | 1.3 km | MPC · JPL |
| 677266 | 2016 TA_{102} | — | October 5, 2016 | Mount Lemmon | Mount Lemmon Survey | · | 2.4 km | MPC · JPL |
| 677267 | 2016 TK_{102} | — | October 3, 2016 | Oukaïmeden | M. Ory | · | 2.5 km | MPC · JPL |
| 677268 | 2016 TM_{105} | — | September 10, 2016 | Mount Lemmon | Mount Lemmon Survey | · | 540 m | MPC · JPL |
| 677269 | 2016 TA_{106} | — | October 12, 2005 | Kitt Peak | Spacewatch | · | 2.1 km | MPC · JPL |
| 677270 | 2016 TN_{107} | — | April 14, 2010 | Mount Lemmon | Mount Lemmon Survey | H | 370 m | MPC · JPL |
| 677271 | 2016 TZ_{107} | — | August 29, 2005 | Kitt Peak | Spacewatch | EOS | 1.7 km | MPC · JPL |
| 677272 | 2016 TF_{113} | — | October 8, 2016 | Mount Lemmon | Mount Lemmon Survey | · | 2.0 km | MPC · JPL |
| 677273 | 2016 TD_{121} | — | October 9, 2016 | Haleakala | Pan-STARRS 1 | · | 2.2 km | MPC · JPL |
| 677274 | 2016 TY_{121} | — | October 10, 2016 | Mount Lemmon | Mount Lemmon Survey | · | 1.8 km | MPC · JPL |
| 677275 | 2016 TF_{122} | — | October 7, 2016 | Haleakala | Pan-STARRS 1 | · | 2.2 km | MPC · JPL |
| 677276 | 2016 TG_{122} | — | October 12, 2016 | Kitt Peak | Spacewatch | · | 2.1 km | MPC · JPL |
| 677277 | 2016 TT_{123} | — | October 13, 2016 | Haleakala | Pan-STARRS 1 | · | 900 m | MPC · JPL |
| 677278 | 2016 TV_{123} | — | October 2, 2016 | Mount Lemmon | Mount Lemmon Survey | · | 2.1 km | MPC · JPL |
| 677279 | 2016 TW_{123} | — | October 10, 2016 | Mount Lemmon | Mount Lemmon Survey | · | 2.4 km | MPC · JPL |
| 677280 | 2016 TY_{123} | — | October 13, 2016 | Mount Lemmon | Mount Lemmon Survey | · | 2.5 km | MPC · JPL |
| 677281 | 2016 TR_{124} | — | October 4, 2016 | Mount Lemmon | Mount Lemmon Survey | LIX | 2.2 km | MPC · JPL |
| 677282 | 2016 TY_{124} | — | October 6, 2016 | Haleakala | Pan-STARRS 1 | · | 2.0 km | MPC · JPL |
| 677283 | 2016 TL_{125} | — | September 27, 2016 | Mount Lemmon | Mount Lemmon Survey | · | 2.5 km | MPC · JPL |
| 677284 | 2016 TT_{125} | — | March 24, 2014 | Haleakala | Pan-STARRS 1 | BRA | 1.4 km | MPC · JPL |
| 677285 | 2016 TA_{126} | — | October 6, 2016 | Mount Lemmon | Mount Lemmon Survey | EOS | 1.5 km | MPC · JPL |
| 677286 | 2016 TQ_{126} | — | October 12, 2016 | Kitt Peak | Spacewatch | · | 1.8 km | MPC · JPL |
| 677287 | 2016 TP_{127} | — | October 13, 2016 | Mount Lemmon | Mount Lemmon Survey | · | 1.5 km | MPC · JPL |
| 677288 | 2016 TM_{133} | — | October 2, 2016 | Mount Lemmon | Mount Lemmon Survey | EOS | 1.7 km | MPC · JPL |
| 677289 | 2016 TS_{133} | — | October 10, 2016 | Mount Lemmon | Mount Lemmon Survey | · | 2.3 km | MPC · JPL |
| 677290 | 2016 TR_{134} | — | October 9, 2016 | Haleakala | Pan-STARRS 1 | · | 2.6 km | MPC · JPL |
| 677291 | 2016 TX_{134} | — | October 5, 2016 | Mount Lemmon | Mount Lemmon Survey | · | 1.9 km | MPC · JPL |
| 677292 | 2016 TU_{150} | — | October 13, 2016 | Haleakala | Pan-STARRS 1 | · | 2.2 km | MPC · JPL |
| 677293 | 2016 TR_{153} | — | October 8, 2016 | Haleakala | Pan-STARRS 1 | · | 1.7 km | MPC · JPL |
| 677294 | 2016 TZ_{153} | — | October 12, 2016 | Mount Lemmon | Mount Lemmon Survey | · | 2.6 km | MPC · JPL |
| 677295 | 2016 TT_{159} | — | September 2, 2010 | Mount Lemmon | Mount Lemmon Survey | · | 2.3 km | MPC · JPL |
| 677296 | 2016 TE_{160} | — | October 9, 2016 | Mount Lemmon | Mount Lemmon Survey | · | 1.9 km | MPC · JPL |
| 677297 | 2016 TF_{164} | — | August 10, 2016 | Haleakala | Pan-STARRS 1 | · | 2.4 km | MPC · JPL |
| 677298 | 2016 TM_{167} | — | October 6, 2016 | Haleakala | Pan-STARRS 1 | · | 1.4 km | MPC · JPL |
| 677299 | 2016 TO_{170} | — | October 2, 2016 | Mount Lemmon | Mount Lemmon Survey | · | 2.1 km | MPC · JPL |
| 677300 | 2016 TQ_{170} | — | October 2, 2016 | Mount Lemmon | Mount Lemmon Survey | EOS | 1.6 km | MPC · JPL |

== 677301–677400 ==
back to top

| Designation | | | Discovery | | | Properties | | Ref |
| Permanent | Provisional | Named after | Date | Site | Discoverer(s) | Category | Diam. | Ref |
|---|---|---|---|---|---|---|---|---|
| 677301 | 2016 TR_{171} | — | October 8, 2016 | Haleakala | Pan-STARRS 1 | · | 2.6 km | MPC · JPL |
| 677302 | 2016 TY_{173} | — | October 8, 2016 | Haleakala | Pan-STARRS 1 | EOS | 1.4 km | MPC · JPL |
| 677303 | 2016 UZ_{1} | — | September 26, 2016 | Haleakala | Pan-STARRS 1 | · | 2.0 km | MPC · JPL |
| 677304 | 2016 UC_{2} | — | February 16, 2013 | Mount Lemmon | Mount Lemmon Survey | EOS | 1.4 km | MPC · JPL |
| 677305 | 2016 UC_{3} | — | October 19, 2016 | Mount Lemmon | Mount Lemmon Survey | · | 1.5 km | MPC · JPL |
| 677306 | 2016 UF_{3} | — | September 28, 2003 | Socorro | LINEAR | MIS | 2.1 km | MPC · JPL |
| 677307 | 2016 UV_{3} | — | August 2, 2016 | Haleakala | Pan-STARRS 1 | · | 2.8 km | MPC · JPL |
| 677308 | 2016 UH_{7} | — | April 29, 2009 | Mount Lemmon | Mount Lemmon Survey | · | 2.1 km | MPC · JPL |
| 677309 | 2016 UR_{7} | — | September 30, 2016 | Haleakala | Pan-STARRS 1 | EOS | 1.6 km | MPC · JPL |
| 677310 | 2016 UD_{8} | — | October 2, 2016 | Mount Lemmon | Mount Lemmon Survey | · | 2.5 km | MPC · JPL |
| 677311 | 2016 UL_{9} | — | September 19, 2011 | Haleakala | Pan-STARRS 1 | · | 1.4 km | MPC · JPL |
| 677312 | 2016 UX_{9} | — | October 8, 2016 | Mount Lemmon | Mount Lemmon Survey | · | 1.6 km | MPC · JPL |
| 677313 | 2016 UD_{11} | — | October 7, 2007 | Mount Lemmon | Mount Lemmon Survey | · | 1.8 km | MPC · JPL |
| 677314 | 2016 UA_{13} | — | September 23, 2011 | Kitt Peak | Spacewatch | · | 1.3 km | MPC · JPL |
| 677315 | 2016 UU_{13} | — | October 20, 2016 | Mount Lemmon | Mount Lemmon Survey | · | 2.6 km | MPC · JPL |
| 677316 | 2016 UB_{14} | — | October 10, 2016 | Mount Lemmon | Mount Lemmon Survey | · | 2.1 km | MPC · JPL |
| 677317 | 2016 UK_{15} | — | January 28, 2011 | Mount Lemmon | Mount Lemmon Survey | · | 420 m | MPC · JPL |
| 677318 | 2016 UZ_{15} | — | August 28, 2005 | Kitt Peak | Spacewatch | · | 2.1 km | MPC · JPL |
| 677319 | 2016 UM_{16} | — | November 1, 2011 | Kitt Peak | Spacewatch | · | 2.3 km | MPC · JPL |
| 677320 | 2016 UV_{16} | — | June 2, 2003 | Cerro Tololo | Deep Ecliptic Survey | VER | 1.9 km | MPC · JPL |
| 677321 | 2016 UX_{17} | — | December 30, 2011 | Mount Lemmon | Mount Lemmon Survey | · | 2.6 km | MPC · JPL |
| 677322 | 2016 UP_{19} | — | January 15, 2008 | Mount Lemmon | Mount Lemmon Survey | · | 1.8 km | MPC · JPL |
| 677323 | 2016 UV_{20} | — | February 14, 2013 | Kitt Peak | Spacewatch | · | 2.6 km | MPC · JPL |
| 677324 | 2016 UC_{23} | — | October 12, 2016 | Mount Lemmon | Mount Lemmon Survey | VER | 2.0 km | MPC · JPL |
| 677325 | 2016 UN_{24} | — | October 10, 2016 | Mount Lemmon | Mount Lemmon Survey | · | 1.8 km | MPC · JPL |
| 677326 | 2016 UA_{28} | — | March 31, 2008 | Mount Lemmon | Mount Lemmon Survey | · | 2.4 km | MPC · JPL |
| 677327 | 2016 UX_{28} | — | September 23, 2016 | XuYi | PMO NEO Survey Program | TIR | 2.6 km | MPC · JPL |
| 677328 | 2016 UW_{29} | — | January 1, 2014 | Kitt Peak | Spacewatch | · | 520 m | MPC · JPL |
| 677329 | 2016 UX_{29} | — | September 14, 2007 | Anderson Mesa | LONEOS | · | 1.8 km | MPC · JPL |
| 677330 | 2016 UA_{30} | — | September 27, 2016 | Mount Lemmon | Mount Lemmon Survey | · | 2.4 km | MPC · JPL |
| 677331 | 2016 UP_{30} | — | October 5, 2016 | Mount Lemmon | Mount Lemmon Survey | · | 2.4 km | MPC · JPL |
| 677332 | 2016 UW_{30} | — | September 27, 2016 | Mount Lemmon | Mount Lemmon Survey | · | 2.5 km | MPC · JPL |
| 677333 | 2016 UO_{33} | — | October 7, 2016 | Haleakala | Pan-STARRS 1 | (43176) | 2.5 km | MPC · JPL |
| 677334 | 2016 UB_{35} | — | March 13, 2013 | Haleakala | Pan-STARRS 1 | · | 2.7 km | MPC · JPL |
| 677335 | 2016 UC_{36} | — | March 3, 2009 | Kitt Peak | Spacewatch | · | 990 m | MPC · JPL |
| 677336 | 2016 UT_{36} | — | July 17, 2016 | Haleakala | Pan-STARRS 1 | · | 2.4 km | MPC · JPL |
| 677337 | 2016 UP_{39} | — | October 25, 2016 | Haleakala | Pan-STARRS 1 | · | 2.5 km | MPC · JPL |
| 677338 | 2016 UZ_{39} | — | October 10, 2016 | Mount Lemmon | Mount Lemmon Survey | · | 2.7 km | MPC · JPL |
| 677339 | 2016 UF_{40} | — | October 25, 2016 | Haleakala | Pan-STARRS 1 | LUT | 3.1 km | MPC · JPL |
| 677340 | 2016 UQ_{42} | — | August 10, 2016 | Haleakala | Pan-STARRS 1 | · | 2.5 km | MPC · JPL |
| 677341 | 2016 UF_{43} | — | October 23, 1995 | Kitt Peak | Spacewatch | (5) | 1.2 km | MPC · JPL |
| 677342 | 2016 UU_{43} | — | October 27, 2011 | Mount Lemmon | Mount Lemmon Survey | · | 2.1 km | MPC · JPL |
| 677343 | 2016 UF_{44} | — | September 3, 2010 | Mount Lemmon | Mount Lemmon Survey | · | 2.6 km | MPC · JPL |
| 677344 | 2016 UW_{45} | — | June 18, 2015 | Haleakala | Pan-STARRS 1 | · | 2.4 km | MPC · JPL |
| 677345 | 2016 UG_{46} | — | November 6, 2008 | Mount Lemmon | Mount Lemmon Survey | · | 1.4 km | MPC · JPL |
| 677346 | 2016 UH_{47} | — | September 30, 2011 | Mount Lemmon | Mount Lemmon Survey | · | 1.4 km | MPC · JPL |
| 677347 | 2016 UA_{48} | — | November 12, 2012 | Nogales | M. Schwartz, P. R. Holvorcem | · | 1.4 km | MPC · JPL |
| 677348 | 2016 UW_{48} | — | September 24, 2007 | Kitt Peak | Spacewatch | · | 1.5 km | MPC · JPL |
| 677349 | 2016 US_{49} | — | October 2, 2016 | Mount Lemmon | Mount Lemmon Survey | · | 2.0 km | MPC · JPL |
| 677350 | 2016 UJ_{50} | — | October 21, 2016 | Mount Lemmon | Mount Lemmon Survey | · | 2.3 km | MPC · JPL |
| 677351 | 2016 UT_{50} | — | September 4, 2011 | Haleakala | Pan-STARRS 1 | GEF | 1.3 km | MPC · JPL |
| 677352 | 2016 UC_{51} | — | October 9, 2016 | Kitt Peak | Spacewatch | · | 780 m | MPC · JPL |
| 677353 | 2016 UH_{51} | — | October 11, 2010 | Mount Lemmon | Mount Lemmon Survey | · | 2.5 km | MPC · JPL |
| 677354 | 2016 UL_{51} | — | May 4, 2014 | Mount Lemmon | Mount Lemmon Survey | EOS | 1.5 km | MPC · JPL |
| 677355 | 2016 UN_{51} | — | October 4, 2016 | Mount Lemmon | Mount Lemmon Survey | · | 2.5 km | MPC · JPL |
| 677356 | 2016 UT_{51} | — | September 16, 2010 | Kitt Peak | Spacewatch | · | 2.3 km | MPC · JPL |
| 677357 | 2016 UV_{51} | — | June 17, 2005 | Mount Lemmon | Mount Lemmon Survey | · | 1.5 km | MPC · JPL |
| 677358 | 2016 UV_{52} | — | October 25, 2016 | Haleakala | Pan-STARRS 1 | · | 3.0 km | MPC · JPL |
| 677359 | 2016 UR_{55} | — | November 8, 2009 | Mount Lemmon | Mount Lemmon Survey | PHO | 630 m | MPC · JPL |
| 677360 | 2016 UT_{55} | — | October 26, 2016 | Haleakala | Pan-STARRS 1 | · | 2.7 km | MPC · JPL |
| 677361 | 2016 UX_{57} | — | December 22, 2012 | Piszkéstető | K. Sárneczky, Hodosan, G. | · | 2.1 km | MPC · JPL |
| 677362 | 2016 US_{58} | — | February 15, 2013 | Haleakala | Pan-STARRS 1 | · | 2.6 km | MPC · JPL |
| 677363 | 2016 UO_{65} | — | November 25, 2011 | Haleakala | Pan-STARRS 1 | EOS | 1.6 km | MPC · JPL |
| 677364 | 2016 UD_{66} | — | April 30, 2005 | Kitt Peak | Spacewatch | · | 2.0 km | MPC · JPL |
| 677365 | 2016 UM_{66} | — | October 27, 2005 | Anderson Mesa | LONEOS | LIX | 2.9 km | MPC · JPL |
| 677366 | 2016 UT_{66} | — | October 21, 2003 | Palomar | NEAT | · | 520 m | MPC · JPL |
| 677367 | 2016 UD_{68} | — | October 13, 2010 | Mayhill-ISON | L. Elenin | URS | 3.0 km | MPC · JPL |
| 677368 | 2016 UU_{68} | — | November 24, 2011 | Haleakala | Pan-STARRS 1 | · | 2.1 km | MPC · JPL |
| 677369 | 2016 UB_{69} | — | September 30, 2016 | Haleakala | Pan-STARRS 1 | · | 2.0 km | MPC · JPL |
| 677370 | 2016 UF_{70} | — | September 27, 2003 | Kitt Peak | Spacewatch | (7744) | 1.0 km | MPC · JPL |
| 677371 | 2016 UL_{70} | — | September 30, 2016 | Haleakala | Pan-STARRS 1 | · | 2.5 km | MPC · JPL |
| 677372 | 2016 UA_{71} | — | May 23, 2011 | Mount Lemmon | Mount Lemmon Survey | EUN | 1.1 km | MPC · JPL |
| 677373 | 2016 UJ_{71} | — | October 25, 2016 | Haleakala | Pan-STARRS 1 | · | 2.2 km | MPC · JPL |
| 677374 | 2016 UE_{73} | — | November 15, 2011 | Mount Lemmon | Mount Lemmon Survey | · | 1.5 km | MPC · JPL |
| 677375 | 2016 UO_{74} | — | March 28, 2014 | Mount Lemmon | Mount Lemmon Survey | · | 1.5 km | MPC · JPL |
| 677376 | 2016 UE_{75} | — | January 23, 2015 | Haleakala | Pan-STARRS 1 | JUN | 900 m | MPC · JPL |
| 677377 | 2016 UV_{75} | — | September 21, 2011 | Haleakala | Pan-STARRS 1 | · | 1.6 km | MPC · JPL |
| 677378 | 2016 UX_{77} | — | October 24, 2009 | Kitt Peak | Spacewatch | PHO | 820 m | MPC · JPL |
| 677379 | 2016 UC_{78} | — | May 31, 2006 | Mount Lemmon | Mount Lemmon Survey | · | 800 m | MPC · JPL |
| 677380 | 2016 UU_{81} | — | September 30, 2016 | Haleakala | Pan-STARRS 1 | · | 1.8 km | MPC · JPL |
| 677381 | 2016 UW_{81} | — | November 3, 2007 | Kitt Peak | Spacewatch | AST | 1.3 km | MPC · JPL |
| 677382 | 2016 UD_{82} | — | August 21, 2006 | Kitt Peak | Spacewatch | · | 1.8 km | MPC · JPL |
| 677383 | 2016 UG_{82} | — | September 29, 2011 | Mount Lemmon | Mount Lemmon Survey | · | 1.8 km | MPC · JPL |
| 677384 | 2016 UM_{83} | — | September 2, 2010 | Mount Lemmon | Mount Lemmon Survey | · | 1.8 km | MPC · JPL |
| 677385 | 2016 UC_{84} | — | December 4, 2010 | Mount Lemmon | Mount Lemmon Survey | · | 710 m | MPC · JPL |
| 677386 | 2016 UJ_{84} | — | May 4, 2005 | Mauna Kea | Veillet, C. | AGN | 1.2 km | MPC · JPL |
| 677387 | 2016 UK_{84} | — | November 27, 2013 | Haleakala | Pan-STARRS 1 | · | 470 m | MPC · JPL |
| 677388 | 2016 UF_{85} | — | October 21, 2016 | Mount Lemmon | Mount Lemmon Survey | · | 1.9 km | MPC · JPL |
| 677389 | 2016 UL_{85} | — | October 9, 2005 | Kitt Peak | Spacewatch | EOS | 1.4 km | MPC · JPL |
| 677390 | 2016 UE_{87} | — | April 4, 2006 | Piszkéstető | K. Sárneczky | ADE | 1.7 km | MPC · JPL |
| 677391 | 2016 UF_{87} | — | March 11, 2005 | Kitt Peak | Deep Ecliptic Survey | DOR | 1.9 km | MPC · JPL |
| 677392 | 2016 UL_{88} | — | July 18, 2001 | Kitt Peak | Spacewatch | · | 1.7 km | MPC · JPL |
| 677393 | 2016 UT_{88} | — | October 26, 2016 | Haleakala | Pan-STARRS 1 | · | 2.4 km | MPC · JPL |
| 677394 | 2016 UN_{89} | — | September 30, 2005 | Mount Lemmon | Mount Lemmon Survey | THM | 1.6 km | MPC · JPL |
| 677395 | 2016 UO_{91} | — | April 20, 2014 | Kitt Peak | Spacewatch | · | 2.3 km | MPC · JPL |
| 677396 | 2016 UW_{91} | — | September 30, 2016 | Haleakala | Pan-STARRS 1 | · | 1.7 km | MPC · JPL |
| 677397 | 2016 UM_{92} | — | January 20, 2009 | Catalina | CSS | · | 1.5 km | MPC · JPL |
| 677398 | 2016 UY_{92} | — | February 28, 2014 | Haleakala | Pan-STARRS 1 | · | 2.4 km | MPC · JPL |
| 677399 | 2016 UT_{93} | — | October 1, 2011 | Charleston | R. Holmes | · | 1.3 km | MPC · JPL |
| 677400 | 2016 UJ_{95} | — | October 26, 2016 | Haleakala | Pan-STARRS 1 | · | 2.0 km | MPC · JPL |

== 677401–677500 ==
back to top

| Designation | | | Discovery | | | Properties | | Ref |
| Permanent | Provisional | Named after | Date | Site | Discoverer(s) | Category | Diam. | Ref |
|---|---|---|---|---|---|---|---|---|
| 677401 | 2016 UP_{95} | — | October 26, 2016 | Haleakala | Pan-STARRS 1 | · | 1.9 km | MPC · JPL |
| 677402 | 2016 UN_{96} | — | October 26, 2016 | Haleakala | Pan-STARRS 1 | VER | 1.9 km | MPC · JPL |
| 677403 | 2016 UG_{97} | — | October 21, 2016 | Mount Lemmon | Mount Lemmon Survey | · | 2.2 km | MPC · JPL |
| 677404 | 2016 UO_{97} | — | October 26, 2011 | Haleakala | Pan-STARRS 1 | · | 1.9 km | MPC · JPL |
| 677405 | 2016 UV_{99} | — | November 2, 2013 | Mount Lemmon | Mount Lemmon Survey | · | 400 m | MPC · JPL |
| 677406 | 2016 UF_{102} | — | April 12, 2013 | XuYi | PMO NEO Survey Program | · | 2.9 km | MPC · JPL |
| 677407 | 2016 UR_{102} | — | October 6, 2005 | Kitt Peak | Spacewatch | · | 2.2 km | MPC · JPL |
| 677408 | 2016 UO_{103} | — | May 8, 2014 | Haleakala | Pan-STARRS 1 | EOS | 1.4 km | MPC · JPL |
| 677409 | 2016 UD_{105} | — | April 8, 2013 | Mount Lemmon | Mount Lemmon Survey | · | 2.2 km | MPC · JPL |
| 677410 | 2016 US_{105} | — | May 17, 2009 | Kitt Peak | Spacewatch | · | 650 m | MPC · JPL |
| 677411 | 2016 UR_{106} | — | February 21, 2009 | Catalina | CSS | · | 2.2 km | MPC · JPL |
| 677412 | 2016 UU_{108} | — | October 10, 2016 | Mount Lemmon | Mount Lemmon Survey | KOR | 970 m | MPC · JPL |
| 677413 | 2016 UJ_{111} | — | October 20, 2016 | Mount Lemmon | Mount Lemmon Survey | · | 2.3 km | MPC · JPL |
| 677414 | 2016 UQ_{114} | — | October 27, 2016 | Haleakala | Pan-STARRS 1 | · | 2.1 km | MPC · JPL |
| 677415 | 2016 UT_{115} | — | October 21, 2016 | Mount Lemmon | Mount Lemmon Survey | · | 1.6 km | MPC · JPL |
| 677416 | 2016 UJ_{117} | — | October 27, 2016 | Mount Lemmon | Mount Lemmon Survey | EOS | 1.4 km | MPC · JPL |
| 677417 | 2016 UY_{119} | — | October 24, 2011 | Haleakala | Pan-STARRS 1 | · | 2.3 km | MPC · JPL |
| 677418 | 2016 UR_{124} | — | October 26, 2016 | Kitt Peak | Spacewatch | · | 2.0 km | MPC · JPL |
| 677419 | 2016 UE_{125} | — | February 1, 2009 | Mount Lemmon | Mount Lemmon Survey | HOF | 2.3 km | MPC · JPL |
| 677420 | 2016 UJ_{125} | — | March 26, 2009 | Kitt Peak | Spacewatch | · | 1.8 km | MPC · JPL |
| 677421 | 2016 UT_{125} | — | October 12, 2016 | Mount Lemmon | Mount Lemmon Survey | · | 1.9 km | MPC · JPL |
| 677422 | 2016 UR_{130} | — | October 27, 2005 | Kitt Peak | Spacewatch | · | 2.2 km | MPC · JPL |
| 677423 | 2016 UT_{130} | — | October 1, 2005 | Mount Lemmon | Mount Lemmon Survey | · | 1.9 km | MPC · JPL |
| 677424 | 2016 UK_{135} | — | September 26, 1995 | Kitt Peak | Spacewatch | · | 1.5 km | MPC · JPL |
| 677425 | 2016 UV_{137} | — | April 10, 2005 | Mount Lemmon | Mount Lemmon Survey | · | 1.8 km | MPC · JPL |
| 677426 | 2016 UR_{139} | — | March 8, 2014 | Mount Lemmon | Mount Lemmon Survey | · | 1.4 km | MPC · JPL |
| 677427 | 2016 UW_{139} | — | January 28, 2014 | Catalina | CSS | MAR | 1.3 km | MPC · JPL |
| 677428 | 2016 UY_{139} | — | October 29, 2016 | Mount Lemmon | Mount Lemmon Survey | · | 2.6 km | MPC · JPL |
| 677429 | 2016 UY_{140} | — | January 14, 2002 | Socorro | LINEAR | · | 2.2 km | MPC · JPL |
| 677430 | 2016 UZ_{140} | — | April 9, 2010 | Mount Lemmon | Mount Lemmon Survey | · | 2.5 km | MPC · JPL |
| 677431 | 2016 UA_{141} | — | June 18, 2015 | Haleakala | Pan-STARRS 1 | · | 2.8 km | MPC · JPL |
| 677432 | 2016 UO_{144} | — | November 14, 2006 | Kitt Peak | Spacewatch | · | 500 m | MPC · JPL |
| 677433 | 2016 UJ_{145} | — | May 14, 2009 | Kitt Peak | Spacewatch | · | 2.4 km | MPC · JPL |
| 677434 | 2016 UA_{147} | — | November 1, 2011 | Mayhill-ISON | L. Elenin | EOS | 1.9 km | MPC · JPL |
| 677435 | 2016 UH_{147} | — | October 8, 2016 | Haleakala | Pan-STARRS 1 | · | 930 m | MPC · JPL |
| 677436 | 2016 UE_{152} | — | October 4, 2005 | Mount Lemmon | Mount Lemmon Survey | · | 2.5 km | MPC · JPL |
| 677437 | 2016 UQ_{155} | — | October 19, 2016 | Mount Lemmon | Mount Lemmon Survey | · | 2.8 km | MPC · JPL |
| 677438 | 2016 UW_{156} | — | December 23, 2017 | Haleakala | Pan-STARRS 1 | · | 1.4 km | MPC · JPL |
| 677439 | 2016 UK_{159} | — | March 28, 2014 | Mount Lemmon | Mount Lemmon Survey | · | 1.8 km | MPC · JPL |
| 677440 | 2016 UR_{170} | — | April 23, 2014 | Cerro Tololo | DECam | EOS | 1.1 km | MPC · JPL |
| 677441 | 2016 UU_{171} | — | January 17, 2013 | Haleakala | Pan-STARRS 1 | · | 1.5 km | MPC · JPL |
| 677442 | 2016 UG_{176} | — | October 26, 2016 | Haleakala | Pan-STARRS 1 | · | 960 m | MPC · JPL |
| 677443 | 2016 UK_{177} | — | July 24, 2015 | Haleakala | Pan-STARRS 1 | · | 1.5 km | MPC · JPL |
| 677444 | 2016 UN_{178} | — | October 26, 2016 | Haleakala | Pan-STARRS 1 | · | 1.3 km | MPC · JPL |
| 677445 | 2016 UE_{179} | — | October 26, 2016 | Haleakala | Pan-STARRS 1 | centaur | 20 km | MPC · JPL |
| 677446 | 2016 UU_{183} | — | October 26, 2016 | Haleakala | Pan-STARRS 1 | · | 1.2 km | MPC · JPL |
| 677447 | 2016 UE_{200} | — | April 3, 2019 | Haleakala | Pan-STARRS 1 | · | 1.7 km | MPC · JPL |
| 677448 | 2016 UJ_{206} | — | February 8, 2011 | Mount Lemmon | Mount Lemmon Survey | · | 290 m | MPC · JPL |
| 677449 | 2016 UO_{246} | — | October 27, 2016 | Mount Lemmon | Mount Lemmon Survey | EOS | 1.1 km | MPC · JPL |
| 677450 | 2016 UR_{246} | — | October 21, 2016 | Mount Lemmon | Mount Lemmon Survey | · | 580 m | MPC · JPL |
| 677451 | 2016 UG_{247} | — | October 19, 2016 | Mount Lemmon | Mount Lemmon Survey | EOS | 1.4 km | MPC · JPL |
| 677452 | 2016 UD_{248} | — | October 21, 2016 | Mount Lemmon | Mount Lemmon Survey | · | 2.6 km | MPC · JPL |
| 677453 | 2016 UC_{249} | — | October 21, 2016 | Mount Lemmon | Mount Lemmon Survey | · | 2.3 km | MPC · JPL |
| 677454 | 2016 UY_{251} | — | October 25, 2016 | Haleakala | Pan-STARRS 1 | · | 2.4 km | MPC · JPL |
| 677455 | 2016 UL_{252} | — | October 28, 2016 | Haleakala | Pan-STARRS 1 | EOS | 1.7 km | MPC · JPL |
| 677456 | 2016 UW_{256} | — | October 21, 2016 | Mount Lemmon | Mount Lemmon Survey | · | 1.8 km | MPC · JPL |
| 677457 | 2016 UO_{260} | — | October 27, 2016 | Mount Lemmon | Mount Lemmon Survey | H | 320 m | MPC · JPL |
| 677458 | 2016 UK_{265} | — | September 4, 2016 | Mount Lemmon | Mount Lemmon Survey | · | 2.4 km | MPC · JPL |
| 677459 | 2016 UW_{266} | — | October 25, 2016 | Haleakala | Pan-STARRS 1 | · | 2.6 km | MPC · JPL |
| 677460 | 2016 UC_{267} | — | October 15, 2015 | Haleakala | Pan-STARRS 1 | · | 2.9 km | MPC · JPL |
| 677461 | 2016 UX_{269} | — | October 24, 2016 | Mount Lemmon | Mount Lemmon Survey | · | 3.3 km | MPC · JPL |
| 677462 | 2016 UL_{270} | — | October 25, 2016 | Haleakala | Pan-STARRS 1 | · | 2.4 km | MPC · JPL |
| 677463 | 2016 UN_{270} | — | October 25, 2016 | Haleakala | Pan-STARRS 1 | · | 2.3 km | MPC · JPL |
| 677464 | 2016 UC_{271} | — | October 25, 2016 | Haleakala | Pan-STARRS 1 | · | 2.0 km | MPC · JPL |
| 677465 | 2016 UP_{272} | — | May 23, 2014 | Haleakala | Pan-STARRS 1 | · | 2.4 km | MPC · JPL |
| 677466 | 2016 UT_{272} | — | October 26, 2016 | Mount Lemmon | Mount Lemmon Survey | · | 2.1 km | MPC · JPL |
| 677467 | 2016 UM_{282} | — | October 25, 2016 | Haleakala | Pan-STARRS 1 | · | 2.1 km | MPC · JPL |
| 677468 | 2016 VW_{1} | — | May 28, 2011 | Nogales | M. Schwartz, P. R. Holvorcem | · | 2.1 km | MPC · JPL |
| 677469 | 2016 VB_{7} | — | November 26, 2011 | Mount Lemmon | Mount Lemmon Survey | · | 1.6 km | MPC · JPL |
| 677470 | 2016 VK_{8} | — | February 7, 2007 | Mount Lemmon | Mount Lemmon Survey | · | 2.8 km | MPC · JPL |
| 677471 | 2016 VF_{9} | — | October 12, 2016 | Mount Lemmon | Mount Lemmon Survey | · | 2.3 km | MPC · JPL |
| 677472 | 2016 VK_{11} | — | October 12, 2016 | Haleakala | Pan-STARRS 1 | EOS | 1.4 km | MPC · JPL |
| 677473 | 2016 VS_{11} | — | August 29, 2005 | Kitt Peak | Spacewatch | · | 1.9 km | MPC · JPL |
| 677474 | 2016 VK_{14} | — | October 13, 2016 | Mount Lemmon | Mount Lemmon Survey | · | 1.4 km | MPC · JPL |
| 677475 | 2016 VQ_{14} | — | March 9, 2005 | Mount Lemmon | Mount Lemmon Survey | · | 2.2 km | MPC · JPL |
| 677476 | 2016 VD_{16} | — | July 18, 2005 | Palomar | NEAT | V | 770 m | MPC · JPL |
| 677477 | 2016 VU_{18} | — | October 13, 2016 | Mount Lemmon | Mount Lemmon Survey | · | 2.5 km | MPC · JPL |
| 677478 | 2016 VT_{20} | — | July 31, 2005 | Palomar | NEAT | · | 2.0 km | MPC · JPL |
| 677479 | 2016 VH_{26} | — | November 10, 2016 | Mount Lemmon | Mount Lemmon Survey | · | 740 m | MPC · JPL |
| 677480 | 2016 VV_{26} | — | November 6, 2016 | Mount Lemmon | Mount Lemmon Survey | · | 560 m | MPC · JPL |
| 677481 | 2016 VR_{27} | — | November 10, 2016 | Mount Lemmon | Mount Lemmon Survey | · | 900 m | MPC · JPL |
| 677482 | 2016 VJ_{28} | — | November 11, 2016 | Mount Lemmon | Mount Lemmon Survey | · | 3.0 km | MPC · JPL |
| 677483 | 2016 VP_{28} | — | November 10, 2016 | Mount Lemmon | Mount Lemmon Survey | · | 690 m | MPC · JPL |
| 677484 | 2016 VQ_{28} | — | November 3, 2016 | Haleakala | Pan-STARRS 1 | · | 820 m | MPC · JPL |
| 677485 | 2016 VA_{30} | — | November 10, 2016 | Mount Lemmon | Mount Lemmon Survey | · | 1.6 km | MPC · JPL |
| 677486 | 2016 VB_{32} | — | November 9, 2016 | Mount Lemmon | Mount Lemmon Survey | · | 2.0 km | MPC · JPL |
| 677487 | 2016 VE_{44} | — | August 14, 2015 | Haleakala | Pan-STARRS 1 | · | 2.1 km | MPC · JPL |
| 677488 | 2016 VN_{44} | — | November 4, 2016 | Haleakala | Pan-STARRS 1 | · | 1.6 km | MPC · JPL |
| 677489 | 2016 VO_{48} | — | November 11, 2016 | Mount Lemmon | Mount Lemmon Survey | · | 3.0 km | MPC · JPL |
| 677490 | 2016 VS_{48} | — | November 9, 2016 | Mount Lemmon | Mount Lemmon Survey | H | 370 m | MPC · JPL |
| 677491 | 2016 VU_{49} | — | November 4, 2016 | Haleakala | Pan-STARRS 1 | · | 2.3 km | MPC · JPL |
| 677492 | 2016 VZ_{51} | — | November 6, 2016 | Mount Lemmon | Mount Lemmon Survey | · | 2.2 km | MPC · JPL |
| 677493 | 2016 VJ_{52} | — | October 10, 2010 | Kitt Peak | Spacewatch | URS | 2.5 km | MPC · JPL |
| 677494 | 2016 VU_{53} | — | November 4, 2016 | Haleakala | Pan-STARRS 1 | · | 1.9 km | MPC · JPL |
| 677495 | 2016 VV_{53} | — | May 7, 2014 | Haleakala | Pan-STARRS 1 | · | 2.7 km | MPC · JPL |
| 677496 | 2016 VW_{57} | — | November 5, 2016 | Mount Lemmon | Mount Lemmon Survey | · | 2.5 km | MPC · JPL |
| 677497 | 2016 VT_{64} | — | November 3, 2016 | Haleakala | Pan-STARRS 1 | NYS | 640 m | MPC · JPL |
| 677498 | 2016 WB | — | March 27, 2015 | Mount Lemmon | Mount Lemmon Survey | H | 470 m | MPC · JPL |
| 677499 | 2016 WW_{3} | — | July 9, 2016 | Mount Lemmon | Mount Lemmon Survey | · | 2.4 km | MPC · JPL |
| 677500 | 2016 WE_{4} | — | October 19, 2011 | Kitt Peak | Spacewatch | · | 1.4 km | MPC · JPL |

== 677501–677600 ==
back to top

| Designation | | | Discovery | | | Properties | | Ref |
| Permanent | Provisional | Named after | Date | Site | Discoverer(s) | Category | Diam. | Ref |
|---|---|---|---|---|---|---|---|---|
| 677501 | 2016 WU_{4} | — | May 8, 2014 | Haleakala | Pan-STARRS 1 | · | 3.0 km | MPC · JPL |
| 677502 | 2016 WP_{6} | — | November 10, 2006 | Kitt Peak | Spacewatch | · | 470 m | MPC · JPL |
| 677503 | 2016 WE_{8} | — | March 25, 2015 | Haleakala | Pan-STARRS 1 | H | 380 m | MPC · JPL |
| 677504 | 2016 WP_{9} | — | November 29, 2016 | Haleakala | Pan-STARRS 1 | · | 1.9 km | MPC · JPL |
| 677505 | 2016 WQ_{12} | — | September 29, 2005 | Kitt Peak | Spacewatch | · | 910 m | MPC · JPL |
| 677506 | 2016 WV_{14} | — | October 26, 2016 | Haleakala | Pan-STARRS 1 | · | 470 m | MPC · JPL |
| 677507 | 2016 WT_{17} | — | October 6, 2011 | Mount Lemmon | Mount Lemmon Survey | · | 2.1 km | MPC · JPL |
| 677508 | 2016 WO_{18} | — | November 1, 2008 | Mount Lemmon | Mount Lemmon Survey | · | 1.1 km | MPC · JPL |
| 677509 | 2016 WJ_{19} | — | November 4, 2016 | Haleakala | Pan-STARRS 1 | · | 2.1 km | MPC · JPL |
| 677510 | 2016 WW_{20} | — | September 17, 2010 | Mount Lemmon | Mount Lemmon Survey | · | 2.1 km | MPC · JPL |
| 677511 | 2016 WP_{21} | — | September 18, 2010 | Mount Lemmon | Mount Lemmon Survey | · | 2.5 km | MPC · JPL |
| 677512 | 2016 WZ_{21} | — | April 19, 2013 | Haleakala | Pan-STARRS 1 | · | 2.6 km | MPC · JPL |
| 677513 | 2016 WT_{22} | — | May 1, 2009 | Cerro Burek | Burek, Cerro | EOS | 1.9 km | MPC · JPL |
| 677514 | 2016 WU_{22} | — | May 30, 2014 | Mount Lemmon | Mount Lemmon Survey | · | 2.2 km | MPC · JPL |
| 677515 | 2016 WC_{24} | — | June 24, 2011 | Catalina | CSS | · | 2.5 km | MPC · JPL |
| 677516 | 2016 WJ_{24} | — | June 9, 2007 | Catalina | CSS | H | 580 m | MPC · JPL |
| 677517 | 2016 WY_{24} | — | January 19, 2007 | Mauna Kea | P. A. Wiegert | · | 1.6 km | MPC · JPL |
| 677518 | 2016 WA_{26} | — | July 8, 2015 | Haleakala | Pan-STARRS 1 | HNS | 1.4 km | MPC · JPL |
| 677519 | 2016 WN_{28} | — | December 13, 2004 | Kitt Peak | Spacewatch | · | 2.3 km | MPC · JPL |
| 677520 | 2016 WK_{31} | — | May 23, 2014 | Haleakala | Pan-STARRS 1 | · | 1.9 km | MPC · JPL |
| 677521 | 2016 WP_{32} | — | March 15, 2008 | Kitt Peak | Spacewatch | · | 1.0 km | MPC · JPL |
| 677522 | 2016 WV_{32} | — | April 5, 2014 | Haleakala | Pan-STARRS 1 | · | 1.7 km | MPC · JPL |
| 677523 | 2016 WA_{33} | — | October 29, 2005 | Catalina | CSS | EOS | 1.8 km | MPC · JPL |
| 677524 | 2016 WJ_{38} | — | November 5, 2005 | Kitt Peak | Spacewatch | · | 2.5 km | MPC · JPL |
| 677525 | 2016 WT_{40} | — | May 28, 2014 | Mount Lemmon | Mount Lemmon Survey | · | 2.0 km | MPC · JPL |
| 677526 | 2016 WP_{46} | — | October 27, 2005 | Kitt Peak | Spacewatch | · | 3.0 km | MPC · JPL |
| 677527 | 2016 WJ_{47} | — | November 30, 2011 | Kitt Peak | Spacewatch | · | 1.7 km | MPC · JPL |
| 677528 | 2016 WU_{50} | — | August 4, 2005 | Palomar | NEAT | · | 1.8 km | MPC · JPL |
| 677529 | 2016 WB_{51} | — | January 21, 2012 | Kitt Peak | Spacewatch | URS | 2.9 km | MPC · JPL |
| 677530 | 2016 WF_{52} | — | May 4, 2006 | Mount Lemmon | Mount Lemmon Survey | · | 1.7 km | MPC · JPL |
| 677531 | 2016 WX_{53} | — | October 13, 2007 | Catalina | CSS | · | 1.6 km | MPC · JPL |
| 677532 | 2016 WF_{57} | — | September 26, 2003 | Palomar | NEAT | · | 1.4 km | MPC · JPL |
| 677533 | 2016 WH_{57} | — | October 26, 2011 | Haleakala | Pan-STARRS 1 | · | 1.6 km | MPC · JPL |
| 677534 | 2016 WN_{59} | — | November 24, 2016 | Haleakala | Pan-STARRS 1 | · | 1.5 km | MPC · JPL |
| 677535 | 2016 WK_{60} | — | November 3, 2004 | Kitt Peak | Spacewatch | T_{j} (2.97) · EUP | 3.6 km | MPC · JPL |
| 677536 | 2016 WM_{61} | — | November 19, 2016 | Mount Lemmon | Mount Lemmon Survey | · | 2.3 km | MPC · JPL |
| 677537 | 2016 WF_{62} | — | November 18, 2016 | Mount Lemmon | Mount Lemmon Survey | · | 2.5 km | MPC · JPL |
| 677538 | 2016 WO_{73} | — | November 19, 2016 | Mount Lemmon | Mount Lemmon Survey | · | 3.3 km | MPC · JPL |
| 677539 | 2016 WA_{74} | — | September 6, 2015 | Haleakala | Pan-STARRS 1 | · | 2.6 km | MPC · JPL |
| 677540 | 2016 WR_{74} | — | November 23, 2016 | Mount Lemmon | Mount Lemmon Survey | · | 2.6 km | MPC · JPL |
| 677541 | 2016 WB_{79} | — | October 30, 2005 | Catalina | CSS | PHO | 790 m | MPC · JPL |
| 677542 | 2016 XV_{3} | — | November 14, 2007 | Kitt Peak | Spacewatch | · | 2.1 km | MPC · JPL |
| 677543 | 2016 XU_{4} | — | July 16, 2007 | Siding Spring | SSS | · | 1.7 km | MPC · JPL |
| 677544 | 2016 XZ_{4} | — | December 6, 2011 | Haleakala | Pan-STARRS 1 | · | 1.9 km | MPC · JPL |
| 677545 | 2016 XJ_{5} | — | October 30, 2011 | Les Engarouines | L. Bernasconi | EOS | 2.0 km | MPC · JPL |
| 677546 | 2016 XN_{6} | — | October 24, 2016 | Mount Lemmon | Mount Lemmon Survey | · | 3.3 km | MPC · JPL |
| 677547 | 2016 XH_{7} | — | July 22, 2007 | Siding Spring | SSS | · | 2.1 km | MPC · JPL |
| 677548 | 2016 XY_{7} | — | December 12, 2004 | Campo Imperatore | CINEOS | · | 630 m | MPC · JPL |
| 677549 | 2016 XD_{8} | — | November 19, 2016 | Mount Lemmon | Mount Lemmon Survey | · | 2.6 km | MPC · JPL |
| 677550 | 2016 XE_{8} | — | September 27, 2016 | Mount Lemmon | Mount Lemmon Survey | · | 2.2 km | MPC · JPL |
| 677551 | 2016 XA_{10} | — | December 30, 2013 | Kitt Peak | Spacewatch | · | 480 m | MPC · JPL |
| 677552 | 2016 XN_{10} | — | November 2, 2007 | Mount Lemmon | Mount Lemmon Survey | EUN | 1.4 km | MPC · JPL |
| 677553 | 2016 XY_{10} | — | November 19, 2007 | Mount Lemmon | Mount Lemmon Survey | · | 1.7 km | MPC · JPL |
| 677554 | 2016 XR_{12} | — | June 21, 2015 | Haleakala | Pan-STARRS 1 | · | 2.0 km | MPC · JPL |
| 677555 | 2016 XE_{15} | — | December 30, 2008 | Mount Lemmon | Mount Lemmon Survey | H | 610 m | MPC · JPL |
| 677556 | 2016 XJ_{16} | — | August 29, 2009 | Kitt Peak | Spacewatch | · | 510 m | MPC · JPL |
| 677557 | 2016 XV_{18} | — | December 29, 2011 | Catalina | CSS | · | 1.6 km | MPC · JPL |
| 677558 | 2016 XD_{19} | — | October 24, 2005 | Mauna Kea | A. Boattini | · | 4.5 km | MPC · JPL |
| 677559 | 2016 XD_{20} | — | April 5, 2014 | Haleakala | Pan-STARRS 1 | · | 1.5 km | MPC · JPL |
| 677560 | 2016 XM_{20} | — | October 12, 2016 | Mount Lemmon | Mount Lemmon Survey | · | 590 m | MPC · JPL |
| 677561 | 2016 XV_{20} | — | September 30, 2008 | Mount Lemmon | Mount Lemmon Survey | H | 500 m | MPC · JPL |
| 677562 | 2016 XX_{20} | — | August 1, 2005 | Siding Spring | SSS | · | 1.3 km | MPC · JPL |
| 677563 | 2016 XP_{26} | — | December 9, 2016 | Mount Lemmon | Mount Lemmon Survey | · | 2.6 km | MPC · JPL |
| 677564 | 2016 XW_{33} | — | November 6, 2010 | Mount Lemmon | Mount Lemmon Survey | LIX | 3.7 km | MPC · JPL |
| 677565 | 2016 XY_{34} | — | August 18, 2015 | Kitt Peak | Spacewatch | · | 2.5 km | MPC · JPL |
| 677566 | 2016 XL_{35} | — | December 5, 2016 | Mount Lemmon | Mount Lemmon Survey | · | 2.4 km | MPC · JPL |
| 677567 | 2016 YV | — | August 21, 2015 | Haleakala | Pan-STARRS 1 | T_{j} (2.91) | 3.6 km | MPC · JPL |
| 677568 | 2016 YA_{5} | — | September 6, 2015 | Haleakala | Pan-STARRS 1 | · | 2.5 km | MPC · JPL |
| 677569 | 2016 YQ_{7} | — | August 13, 2010 | Kitt Peak | Spacewatch | · | 2.4 km | MPC · JPL |
| 677570 | 2016 YO_{8} | — | October 30, 2008 | Catalina | CSS | H | 480 m | MPC · JPL |
| 677571 | 2016 YX_{8} | — | January 26, 2012 | Mount Lemmon | Mount Lemmon Survey | VER | 2.5 km | MPC · JPL |
| 677572 | 2016 YE_{12} | — | December 22, 2003 | Kitt Peak | Spacewatch | · | 840 m | MPC · JPL |
| 677573 | 2016 YK_{14} | — | October 18, 2015 | Haleakala | Pan-STARRS 1 | VER | 2.4 km | MPC · JPL |
| 677574 | 2016 YM_{17} | — | December 27, 2016 | Mount Lemmon | Mount Lemmon Survey | · | 520 m | MPC · JPL |
| 677575 | 2016 YY_{20} | — | September 6, 2015 | Haleakala | Pan-STARRS 1 | EOS | 1.6 km | MPC · JPL |
| 677576 | 2017 AH | — | February 16, 2015 | Haleakala | Pan-STARRS 1 | H | 380 m | MPC · JPL |
| 677577 | 2017 AX | — | December 31, 2011 | Mayhill-ISON | L. Elenin | · | 2.2 km | MPC · JPL |
| 677578 | 2017 AV_{3} | — | January 2, 2017 | Haleakala | Pan-STARRS 1 | APO | 410 m | MPC · JPL |
| 677579 | 2017 AF_{5} | — | January 4, 2017 | ATLAS-HKO, Haleaka | ATLAS | T_{j} (2.5) · APO +1km | 990 m | MPC · JPL |
| 677580 | 2017 AT_{5} | — | September 20, 2011 | Kitt Peak | Spacewatch | · | 2.2 km | MPC · JPL |
| 677581 | 2017 AT_{8} | — | December 11, 2004 | Catalina | CSS | · | 1.7 km | MPC · JPL |
| 677582 | 2017 AQ_{9} | — | April 16, 2013 | Cerro Tololo-DECam | DECam | · | 2.9 km | MPC · JPL |
| 677583 | 2017 AX_{9} | — | September 23, 2015 | Haleakala | Pan-STARRS 1 | EOS | 1.6 km | MPC · JPL |
| 677584 | 2017 AV_{10} | — | June 19, 2009 | Kitt Peak | Spacewatch | · | 2.3 km | MPC · JPL |
| 677585 | 2017 AZ_{10} | — | October 9, 2015 | Haleakala | Pan-STARRS 1 | · | 1.4 km | MPC · JPL |
| 677586 | 2017 AG_{11} | — | January 19, 2012 | Haleakala | Pan-STARRS 1 | · | 2.3 km | MPC · JPL |
| 677587 | 2017 AE_{12} | — | April 12, 2004 | Kitt Peak | Spacewatch | AEO | 1.2 km | MPC · JPL |
| 677588 | 2017 AV_{16} | — | May 9, 2005 | Kitt Peak | Spacewatch | · | 2.1 km | MPC · JPL |
| 677589 | 2017 AL_{19} | — | October 10, 2005 | Kitt Peak | Spacewatch | · | 860 m | MPC · JPL |
| 677590 | 2017 AQ_{21} | — | November 30, 2005 | Mount Lemmon | Mount Lemmon Survey | · | 3.4 km | MPC · JPL |
| 677591 | 2017 AJ_{32} | — | January 3, 2017 | Haleakala | Pan-STARRS 1 | · | 670 m | MPC · JPL |
| 677592 | 2017 AG_{34} | — | January 4, 2017 | Haleakala | Pan-STARRS 1 | · | 810 m | MPC · JPL |
| 677593 | 2017 AJ_{34} | — | January 3, 2017 | Haleakala | Pan-STARRS 1 | H | 330 m | MPC · JPL |
| 677594 | 2017 AF_{36} | — | January 3, 2017 | Haleakala | Pan-STARRS 1 | H | 510 m | MPC · JPL |
| 677595 | 2017 AQ_{46} | — | May 30, 2014 | Haleakala | Pan-STARRS 1 | · | 910 m | MPC · JPL |
| 677596 | 2017 AV_{47} | — | January 2, 2017 | Haleakala | Pan-STARRS 1 | · | 1.9 km | MPC · JPL |
| 677597 | 2017 AL_{51} | — | January 3, 2017 | Haleakala | Pan-STARRS 1 | · | 1.5 km | MPC · JPL |
| 677598 | 2017 BE_{1} | — | February 1, 2006 | Kitt Peak | Spacewatch | HYG | 3.2 km | MPC · JPL |
| 677599 | 2017 BJ_{4} | — | April 27, 2012 | Haleakala | Pan-STARRS 1 | T_{j} (2.97) | 3.4 km | MPC · JPL |
| 677600 | 2017 BM_{6} | — | January 27, 2017 | Nogales | M. Schwartz, P. R. Holvorcem | APO | 360 m | MPC · JPL |

== 677601–677700 ==
back to top

| Designation | | | Discovery | | | Properties | | Ref |
| Permanent | Provisional | Named after | Date | Site | Discoverer(s) | Category | Diam. | Ref |
|---|---|---|---|---|---|---|---|---|
| 677601 | 2017 BA_{9} | — | March 7, 2013 | Haleakala | Pan-STARRS 1 | · | 930 m | MPC · JPL |
| 677602 | 2017 BB_{9} | — | April 20, 2007 | Mount Lemmon | Mount Lemmon Survey | · | 2.5 km | MPC · JPL |
| 677603 | 2017 BV_{9} | — | January 7, 2017 | Mount Lemmon | Mount Lemmon Survey | · | 580 m | MPC · JPL |
| 677604 | 2017 BQ_{11} | — | February 23, 2012 | Kitt Peak | Spacewatch | · | 2.6 km | MPC · JPL |
| 677605 | 2017 BR_{11} | — | October 1, 2003 | Kitt Peak | Spacewatch | · | 3.5 km | MPC · JPL |
| 677606 | 2017 BX_{12} | — | August 25, 2011 | Siding Spring | SSS | · | 2.1 km | MPC · JPL |
| 677607 | 2017 BP_{14} | — | December 12, 2006 | Kitt Peak | Spacewatch | · | 2.3 km | MPC · JPL |
| 677608 | 2017 BZ_{16} | — | December 1, 2005 | Kitt Peak | Spacewatch | · | 2.5 km | MPC · JPL |
| 677609 | 2017 BJ_{19} | — | November 16, 2010 | Mount Lemmon | Mount Lemmon Survey | · | 2.4 km | MPC · JPL |
| 677610 | 2017 BO_{22} | — | February 4, 2006 | Kitt Peak | Spacewatch | · | 2.8 km | MPC · JPL |
| 677611 | 2017 BS_{24} | — | February 16, 2004 | Socorro | LINEAR | EUN | 1.3 km | MPC · JPL |
| 677612 | 2017 BY_{26} | — | August 18, 2002 | Palomar | NEAT | EUP | 2.9 km | MPC · JPL |
| 677613 | 2017 BY_{29} | — | June 1, 2009 | Catalina | CSS | · | 1.5 km | MPC · JPL |
| 677614 | 2017 BE_{35} | — | January 10, 2006 | Kitt Peak | Spacewatch | EOS | 2.2 km | MPC · JPL |
| 677615 | 2017 BJ_{35} | — | January 20, 2017 | GINOP-KHK, Piszkes | K. Sárneczky | · | 1.6 km | MPC · JPL |
| 677616 | 2017 BS_{35} | — | January 9, 2006 | Kitt Peak | Spacewatch | · | 3.1 km | MPC · JPL |
| 677617 | 2017 BR_{37} | — | December 6, 2005 | Kitt Peak | Spacewatch | · | 1.9 km | MPC · JPL |
| 677618 | 2017 BF_{38} | — | June 24, 2009 | Mount Lemmon | Mount Lemmon Survey | BRA | 1.9 km | MPC · JPL |
| 677619 | 2017 BR_{38} | — | February 26, 2014 | Haleakala | Pan-STARRS 1 | · | 560 m | MPC · JPL |
| 677620 | 2017 BO_{40} | — | April 19, 2007 | Kitt Peak | Spacewatch | · | 570 m | MPC · JPL |
| 677621 | 2017 BW_{40} | — | September 18, 2009 | Kitt Peak | Spacewatch | · | 3.1 km | MPC · JPL |
| 677622 | 2017 BO_{42} | — | January 7, 2017 | Mount Lemmon | Mount Lemmon Survey | · | 480 m | MPC · JPL |
| 677623 | 2017 BQ_{45} | — | February 21, 2007 | Kitt Peak | Spacewatch | · | 490 m | MPC · JPL |
| 677624 | 2017 BA_{46} | — | December 8, 2010 | Mayhill-ISON | L. Elenin | EOS | 2.1 km | MPC · JPL |
| 677625 | 2017 BY_{49} | — | October 18, 2015 | Haleakala | Pan-STARRS 1 | · | 2.3 km | MPC · JPL |
| 677626 | 2017 BD_{50} | — | January 9, 2017 | Mount Lemmon | Mount Lemmon Survey | · | 570 m | MPC · JPL |
| 677627 | 2017 BS_{53} | — | September 18, 2012 | Mount Lemmon | Mount Lemmon Survey | · | 640 m | MPC · JPL |
| 677628 | 2017 BU_{53} | — | January 5, 2006 | Kitt Peak | Spacewatch | EOS | 2.1 km | MPC · JPL |
| 677629 | 2017 BX_{55} | — | September 22, 2009 | Catalina | CSS | · | 3.7 km | MPC · JPL |
| 677630 | 2017 BA_{59} | — | May 20, 2014 | Haleakala | Pan-STARRS 1 | · | 550 m | MPC · JPL |
| 677631 | 2017 BP_{59} | — | December 1, 2005 | Mount Lemmon | Mount Lemmon Survey | · | 1.1 km | MPC · JPL |
| 677632 | 2017 BV_{62} | — | September 18, 2001 | Apache Point | SDSS | · | 2.2 km | MPC · JPL |
| 677633 | 2017 BW_{62} | — | October 2, 2006 | Mount Lemmon | Mount Lemmon Survey | · | 1.9 km | MPC · JPL |
| 677634 | 2017 BH_{63} | — | March 8, 2014 | Mount Lemmon | Mount Lemmon Survey | · | 550 m | MPC · JPL |
| 677635 | 2017 BA_{64} | — | January 9, 2017 | Mount Lemmon | Mount Lemmon Survey | · | 660 m | MPC · JPL |
| 677636 | 2017 BG_{65} | — | October 10, 2005 | Kitt Peak | Spacewatch | · | 2.2 km | MPC · JPL |
| 677637 | 2017 BX_{65} | — | August 27, 2004 | Catalina | CSS | · | 2.8 km | MPC · JPL |
| 677638 | 2017 BL_{67} | — | January 9, 2017 | Mount Lemmon | Mount Lemmon Survey | · | 600 m | MPC · JPL |
| 677639 | 2017 BA_{72} | — | December 22, 2006 | Kitt Peak | Spacewatch | KOR | 1.5 km | MPC · JPL |
| 677640 | 2017 BM_{75} | — | January 23, 2006 | Mount Lemmon | Mount Lemmon Survey | · | 2.6 km | MPC · JPL |
| 677641 | 2017 BU_{76} | — | April 7, 2011 | Kitt Peak | Spacewatch | · | 600 m | MPC · JPL |
| 677642 | 2017 BX_{77} | — | October 22, 2012 | Kitt Peak | Spacewatch | V | 420 m | MPC · JPL |
| 677643 | 2017 BS_{79} | — | February 24, 2012 | Kitt Peak | Spacewatch | · | 2.7 km | MPC · JPL |
| 677644 | 2017 BU_{79} | — | March 8, 2013 | Haleakala | Pan-STARRS 1 | · | 1.5 km | MPC · JPL |
| 677645 | 2017 BS_{81} | — | June 3, 2014 | Haleakala | Pan-STARRS 1 | · | 2.9 km | MPC · JPL |
| 677646 | 2017 BJ_{83} | — | December 23, 2016 | Haleakala | Pan-STARRS 1 | LIX | 3.4 km | MPC · JPL |
| 677647 | 2017 BW_{83} | — | September 9, 2015 | Haleakala | Pan-STARRS 1 | · | 2.9 km | MPC · JPL |
| 677648 | 2017 BN_{85} | — | May 7, 2014 | Haleakala | Pan-STARRS 1 | · | 450 m | MPC · JPL |
| 677649 | 2017 BX_{86} | — | December 10, 2005 | Kitt Peak | Spacewatch | EOS | 1.9 km | MPC · JPL |
| 677650 | 2017 BY_{89} | — | October 21, 2012 | Mount Lemmon | Mount Lemmon Survey | V | 450 m | MPC · JPL |
| 677651 | 2017 BQ_{95} | — | November 13, 2006 | Kitt Peak | Spacewatch | · | 3.0 km | MPC · JPL |
| 677652 | 2017 BN_{99} | — | July 9, 2003 | Junk Bond | D. Healy | EOS | 2.3 km | MPC · JPL |
| 677653 | 2017 BO_{101} | — | October 9, 2004 | Kitt Peak | Spacewatch | · | 2.2 km | MPC · JPL |
| 677654 | 2017 BR_{101} | — | February 28, 2012 | Haleakala | Pan-STARRS 1 | EOS | 1.8 km | MPC · JPL |
| 677655 | 2017 BB_{102} | — | March 13, 2013 | Mount Lemmon | Mount Lemmon Survey | EUN | 1.2 km | MPC · JPL |
| 677656 | 2017 BV_{104} | — | September 24, 2009 | Mount Lemmon | Mount Lemmon Survey | · | 580 m | MPC · JPL |
| 677657 | 2017 BW_{106} | — | January 29, 2017 | Mount Lemmon | Mount Lemmon Survey | · | 1.9 km | MPC · JPL |
| 677658 | 2017 BH_{107} | — | January 29, 2017 | Mount Lemmon | Mount Lemmon Survey | · | 1.5 km | MPC · JPL |
| 677659 | 2017 BM_{107} | — | May 27, 2014 | Haleakala | Pan-STARRS 1 | · | 3.4 km | MPC · JPL |
| 677660 | 2017 BU_{107} | — | October 23, 2011 | Haleakala | Pan-STARRS 1 | · | 1.4 km | MPC · JPL |
| 677661 | 2017 BC_{108} | — | October 23, 2003 | Apache Point | SDSS Collaboration | · | 2.7 km | MPC · JPL |
| 677662 | 2017 BE_{108} | — | December 11, 2012 | Mount Lemmon | Mount Lemmon Survey | · | 760 m | MPC · JPL |
| 677663 | 2017 BK_{108} | — | December 10, 2010 | Mount Lemmon | Mount Lemmon Survey | · | 3.0 km | MPC · JPL |
| 677664 | 2017 BJ_{110} | — | March 5, 2002 | Apache Point | SDSS Collaboration | · | 1.9 km | MPC · JPL |
| 677665 | 2017 BK_{110} | — | October 29, 2011 | Haleakala | Pan-STARRS 1 | JUN | 730 m | MPC · JPL |
| 677666 | 2017 BK_{111} | — | May 16, 2013 | Mount Lemmon | Mount Lemmon Survey | · | 1.7 km | MPC · JPL |
| 677667 | 2017 BA_{116} | — | September 5, 2004 | Siding Spring | SSS | · | 2.9 km | MPC · JPL |
| 677668 | 2017 BJ_{116} | — | February 20, 2012 | Haleakala | Pan-STARRS 1 | · | 2.9 km | MPC · JPL |
| 677669 | 2017 BA_{117} | — | September 19, 2006 | Catalina | CSS | EUN | 1.5 km | MPC · JPL |
| 677670 | 2017 BL_{117} | — | March 17, 2012 | Kitt Peak | Spacewatch | · | 3.3 km | MPC · JPL |
| 677671 | 2017 BT_{117} | — | May 4, 2008 | Kitt Peak | Spacewatch | · | 1.8 km | MPC · JPL |
| 677672 | 2017 BT_{118} | — | January 7, 2010 | Kitt Peak | Spacewatch | · | 560 m | MPC · JPL |
| 677673 | 2017 BA_{120} | — | January 16, 2003 | Palomar | NEAT | PHO | 680 m | MPC · JPL |
| 677674 | 2017 BB_{120} | — | June 5, 2014 | Haleakala | Pan-STARRS 1 | · | 3.2 km | MPC · JPL |
| 677675 | 2017 BG_{120} | — | August 7, 2008 | La Sagra | OAM | EOS | 2.2 km | MPC · JPL |
| 677676 | 2017 BK_{120} | — | September 21, 2003 | Palomar | NEAT | · | 3.6 km | MPC · JPL |
| 677677 | 2017 BV_{121} | — | December 10, 2009 | Mount Lemmon | Mount Lemmon Survey | · | 690 m | MPC · JPL |
| 677678 | 2017 BA_{122} | — | December 10, 2005 | Kitt Peak | Spacewatch | · | 2.3 km | MPC · JPL |
| 677679 | 2017 BH_{122} | — | April 5, 2014 | Haleakala | Pan-STARRS 1 | V | 440 m | MPC · JPL |
| 677680 | 2017 BJ_{123} | — | October 1, 2005 | Mount Lemmon | Mount Lemmon Survey | · | 590 m | MPC · JPL |
| 677681 | 2017 BL_{124} | — | January 5, 2006 | Kitt Peak | Spacewatch | · | 2.8 km | MPC · JPL |
| 677682 | 2017 BP_{124} | — | August 2, 2008 | Siding Spring | SSS | · | 3.6 km | MPC · JPL |
| 677683 | 2017 BD_{126} | — | January 19, 2012 | Haleakala | Pan-STARRS 1 | · | 1.9 km | MPC · JPL |
| 677684 | 2017 BJ_{126} | — | October 20, 2006 | Kitt Peak | Deep Ecliptic Survey | · | 2.1 km | MPC · JPL |
| 677685 | 2017 BU_{128} | — | February 28, 2014 | Haleakala | Pan-STARRS 1 | · | 540 m | MPC · JPL |
| 677686 | 2017 BA_{130} | — | May 5, 2002 | Palomar | NEAT | · | 2.7 km | MPC · JPL |
| 677687 | 2017 BH_{134} | — | March 12, 2007 | Mount Lemmon | Mount Lemmon Survey | · | 510 m | MPC · JPL |
| 677688 | 2017 BA_{135} | — | May 23, 2014 | Haleakala | Pan-STARRS 1 | V | 610 m | MPC · JPL |
| 677689 | 2017 BT_{136} | — | December 14, 2010 | Mount Lemmon | Mount Lemmon Survey | · | 2.1 km | MPC · JPL |
| 677690 | 2017 BD_{137} | — | March 4, 2012 | Mount Lemmon | Mount Lemmon Survey | · | 2.4 km | MPC · JPL |
| 677691 | 2017 BQ_{137} | — | January 1, 2012 | Mount Lemmon | Mount Lemmon Survey | · | 2.5 km | MPC · JPL |
| 677692 | 2017 BB_{138} | — | September 19, 2014 | Haleakala | Pan-STARRS 1 | · | 3.1 km | MPC · JPL |
| 677693 | 2017 BH_{138} | — | October 12, 2015 | Haleakala | Pan-STARRS 1 | TIR | 2.1 km | MPC · JPL |
| 677694 | 2017 BM_{138} | — | September 17, 2006 | Kitt Peak | Spacewatch | · | 1.8 km | MPC · JPL |
| 677695 | 2017 BC_{139} | — | May 1, 2014 | Mount Lemmon | Mount Lemmon Survey | · | 620 m | MPC · JPL |
| 677696 | 2017 BL_{139} | — | September 25, 2006 | Kitt Peak | Spacewatch | · | 1.7 km | MPC · JPL |
| 677697 | 2017 BR_{140} | — | September 18, 2011 | Mount Lemmon | Mount Lemmon Survey | V | 480 m | MPC · JPL |
| 677698 | 2017 BU_{146} | — | January 26, 2017 | Haleakala | Pan-STARRS 1 | · | 670 m | MPC · JPL |
| 677699 | 2017 BM_{148} | — | January 27, 2017 | Haleakala | Pan-STARRS 1 | · | 660 m | MPC · JPL |
| 677700 | 2017 BZ_{148} | — | January 26, 2017 | Mount Lemmon | Mount Lemmon Survey | · | 410 m | MPC · JPL |

== 677701–677800 ==
back to top

| Designation | | | Discovery | | | Properties | | Ref |
| Permanent | Provisional | Named after | Date | Site | Discoverer(s) | Category | Diam. | Ref |
|---|---|---|---|---|---|---|---|---|
| 677701 | 2017 BL_{149} | — | January 27, 2017 | Haleakala | Pan-STARRS 1 | · | 660 m | MPC · JPL |
| 677702 | 2017 BV_{149} | — | January 28, 2017 | Haleakala | Pan-STARRS 1 | · | 510 m | MPC · JPL |
| 677703 | 2017 BW_{149} | — | January 31, 2017 | Haleakala | Pan-STARRS 1 | · | 450 m | MPC · JPL |
| 677704 | 2017 BN_{150} | — | January 26, 2017 | Mount Lemmon | Mount Lemmon Survey | · | 570 m | MPC · JPL |
| 677705 | 2017 BM_{153} | — | January 29, 2017 | Haleakala | Pan-STARRS 1 | VER | 1.9 km | MPC · JPL |
| 677706 | 2017 BU_{153} | — | January 29, 2017 | Haleakala | Pan-STARRS 1 | · | 980 m | MPC · JPL |
| 677707 | 2017 BA_{157} | — | January 26, 2017 | Haleakala | Pan-STARRS 1 | V | 510 m | MPC · JPL |
| 677708 | 2017 BC_{166} | — | January 30, 2017 | Mount Lemmon | Mount Lemmon Survey | H | 320 m | MPC · JPL |
| 677709 | 2017 BU_{172} | — | January 27, 2017 | Haleakala | Pan-STARRS 1 | · | 720 m | MPC · JPL |
| 677710 | 2017 BC_{179} | — | January 19, 2017 | Mount Lemmon | Mount Lemmon Survey | · | 710 m | MPC · JPL |
| 677711 | 2017 BA_{181} | — | January 29, 2017 | Haleakala | Pan-STARRS 1 | · | 690 m | MPC · JPL |
| 677712 | 2017 BO_{210} | — | January 29, 2017 | Haleakala | Pan-STARRS 1 | L5 | 6.7 km | MPC · JPL |
| 677713 | 2017 CM | — | February 2, 2017 | Catalina | CSS | H | 570 m | MPC · JPL |
| 677714 | 2017 CB_{2} | — | September 27, 2012 | Haleakala | Pan-STARRS 1 | · | 1.1 km | MPC · JPL |
| 677715 | 2017 CF_{2} | — | August 27, 2001 | Anderson Mesa | LONEOS | · | 1.0 km | MPC · JPL |
| 677716 | 2017 CU_{3} | — | October 30, 2010 | Catalina | CSS | T_{j} (2.98) | 2.3 km | MPC · JPL |
| 677717 | 2017 CQ_{8} | — | May 7, 2014 | Haleakala | Pan-STARRS 1 | · | 480 m | MPC · JPL |
| 677718 | 2017 CA_{9} | — | May 23, 2014 | Haleakala | Pan-STARRS 1 | · | 640 m | MPC · JPL |
| 677719 | 2017 CD_{9} | — | October 18, 2007 | Kitt Peak | Spacewatch | BRG | 1.3 km | MPC · JPL |
| 677720 | 2017 CU_{9} | — | May 7, 2014 | Haleakala | Pan-STARRS 1 | · | 580 m | MPC · JPL |
| 677721 | 2017 CJ_{10} | — | January 23, 2007 | Bergisch Gladbach | W. Bickel | · | 610 m | MPC · JPL |
| 677722 | 2017 CO_{10} | — | March 12, 2013 | Piszkéstető | K. Sárneczky | · | 2.2 km | MPC · JPL |
| 677723 | 2017 CP_{12} | — | September 16, 2015 | Heaven on Earth Ob | W. K. Y. Yeung | · | 770 m | MPC · JPL |
| 677724 | 2017 CO_{13} | — | February 28, 2014 | Haleakala | Pan-STARRS 1 | · | 580 m | MPC · JPL |
| 677725 | 2017 CD_{14} | — | January 26, 2017 | Mount Lemmon | Mount Lemmon Survey | · | 530 m | MPC · JPL |
| 677726 | 2017 CP_{15} | — | October 10, 2015 | Haleakala | Pan-STARRS 1 | · | 2.9 km | MPC · JPL |
| 677727 | 2017 CN_{17} | — | January 27, 2007 | Mount Lemmon | Mount Lemmon Survey | · | 540 m | MPC · JPL |
| 677728 | 2017 CS_{19} | — | January 4, 2011 | Mount Lemmon | Mount Lemmon Survey | · | 3.5 km | MPC · JPL |
| 677729 | 2017 CB_{23} | — | January 24, 2007 | Mount Lemmon | Mount Lemmon Survey | · | 600 m | MPC · JPL |
| 677730 | 2017 CJ_{25} | — | September 25, 2009 | Kitt Peak | Spacewatch | · | 2.3 km | MPC · JPL |
| 677731 | 2017 CV_{26} | — | December 6, 2011 | Haleakala | Pan-STARRS 1 | · | 2.6 km | MPC · JPL |
| 677732 | 2017 CN_{29} | — | February 10, 2008 | Catalina | CSS | · | 1.1 km | MPC · JPL |
| 677733 | 2017 CL_{30} | — | February 15, 2010 | Mount Lemmon | Mount Lemmon Survey | · | 490 m | MPC · JPL |
| 677734 | 2017 CP_{31} | — | August 21, 2015 | Haleakala | Pan-STARRS 1 | · | 2.8 km | MPC · JPL |
| 677735 | 2017 CZ_{31} | — | May 24, 2014 | Mount Lemmon | Mount Lemmon Survey | PHO | 800 m | MPC · JPL |
| 677736 | 2017 CM_{33} | — | October 9, 2010 | Mount Lemmon | Mount Lemmon Survey | · | 2.1 km | MPC · JPL |
| 677737 | 2017 CO_{33} | — | August 22, 2014 | Haleakala | Pan-STARRS 1 | · | 3.2 km | MPC · JPL |
| 677738 | 2017 CF_{35} | — | January 10, 2013 | Haleakala | Pan-STARRS 1 | · | 750 m | MPC · JPL |
| 677739 | 2017 CX_{38} | — | February 4, 2017 | Mount Lemmon | Mount Lemmon Survey | · | 1.1 km | MPC · JPL |
| 677740 | 2017 CC_{40} | — | February 8, 2017 | Mount Lemmon | Mount Lemmon Survey | H | 470 m | MPC · JPL |
| 677741 | 2017 CD_{41} | — | February 4, 2017 | Haleakala | Pan-STARRS 1 | PHO | 610 m | MPC · JPL |
| 677742 | 2017 CV_{43} | — | February 4, 2017 | Mount Lemmon | Mount Lemmon Survey | · | 880 m | MPC · JPL |
| 677743 | 2017 CV_{44} | — | February 3, 2017 | Haleakala | Pan-STARRS 1 | · | 890 m | MPC · JPL |
| 677744 | 2017 DA_{1} | — | July 14, 2015 | Haleakala | Pan-STARRS 1 | PHO | 880 m | MPC · JPL |
| 677745 | 2017 DB_{1} | — | April 5, 2014 | Haleakala | Pan-STARRS 1 | · | 690 m | MPC · JPL |
| 677746 | 2017 DY_{1} | — | September 18, 2009 | Kitt Peak | Spacewatch | · | 2.3 km | MPC · JPL |
| 677747 | 2017 DM_{2} | — | January 4, 2017 | Haleakala | Pan-STARRS 1 | PHO | 660 m | MPC · JPL |
| 677748 | 2017 DJ_{3} | — | January 6, 2010 | Kitt Peak | Spacewatch | · | 570 m | MPC · JPL |
| 677749 | 2017 DL_{3} | — | January 29, 2012 | Kitt Peak | Spacewatch | · | 1.9 km | MPC · JPL |
| 677750 | 2017 DL_{4} | — | September 16, 2006 | Kitt Peak | Spacewatch | · | 1.6 km | MPC · JPL |
| 677751 | 2017 DD_{6} | — | November 4, 2004 | Kitt Peak | Spacewatch | · | 2.7 km | MPC · JPL |
| 677752 | 2017 DH_{6} | — | December 11, 2010 | Mount Lemmon | Mount Lemmon Survey | · | 3.2 km | MPC · JPL |
| 677753 | 2017 DD_{7} | — | October 17, 2003 | Kitt Peak | Spacewatch | · | 3.2 km | MPC · JPL |
| 677754 | 2017 DL_{7} | — | April 22, 2004 | Apache Point | SDSS Collaboration | H | 640 m | MPC · JPL |
| 677755 | 2017 DH_{9} | — | January 10, 2007 | Mount Lemmon | Mount Lemmon Survey | · | 2.8 km | MPC · JPL |
| 677756 | 2017 DK_{9} | — | January 4, 2011 | Mount Lemmon | Mount Lemmon Survey | · | 3.7 km | MPC · JPL |
| 677757 | 2017 DL_{9} | — | June 4, 2014 | Haleakala | Pan-STARRS 1 | · | 830 m | MPC · JPL |
| 677758 | 2017 DO_{9} | — | February 6, 2006 | Kitt Peak | Spacewatch | · | 2.8 km | MPC · JPL |
| 677759 | 2017 DQ_{9} | — | March 5, 2013 | Mount Lemmon | Mount Lemmon Survey | BRG | 890 m | MPC · JPL |
| 677760 | 2017 DC_{10} | — | October 5, 2004 | Kitt Peak | Spacewatch | · | 1.9 km | MPC · JPL |
| 677761 | 2017 DX_{10} | — | March 8, 2008 | Mount Lemmon | Mount Lemmon Survey | · | 2.2 km | MPC · JPL |
| 677762 | 2017 DE_{11} | — | October 2, 2008 | Mount Lemmon | Mount Lemmon Survey | · | 720 m | MPC · JPL |
| 677763 | 2017 DE_{12} | — | December 5, 2005 | Mount Lemmon | Mount Lemmon Survey | · | 2.6 km | MPC · JPL |
| 677764 | 2017 DF_{12} | — | July 19, 2015 | Haleakala | Pan-STARRS 2 | · | 1.2 km | MPC · JPL |
| 677765 | 2017 DB_{13} | — | February 13, 2008 | Catalina | CSS | · | 1.9 km | MPC · JPL |
| 677766 | 2017 DH_{13} | — | October 9, 2004 | Kitt Peak | Spacewatch | · | 3.1 km | MPC · JPL |
| 677767 | 2017 DF_{14} | — | June 29, 2014 | Haleakala | Pan-STARRS 1 | EOS | 2.3 km | MPC · JPL |
| 677768 | 2017 DW_{15} | — | July 27, 2011 | Haleakala | Pan-STARRS 1 | · | 680 m | MPC · JPL |
| 677769 | 2017 DP_{17} | — | April 20, 2010 | Kitt Peak | Spacewatch | · | 1.0 km | MPC · JPL |
| 677770 | 2017 DU_{20} | — | March 11, 2007 | Kitt Peak | Spacewatch | · | 2.2 km | MPC · JPL |
| 677771 | 2017 DY_{22} | — | August 26, 2012 | Haleakala | Pan-STARRS 1 | · | 550 m | MPC · JPL |
| 677772 Bettonvil | 2017 DA_{23} | Bettonvil | October 18, 2012 | Piszkéstető | M. Langbroek, K. Sárneczky | · | 570 m | MPC · JPL |
| 677773 | 2017 DP_{25} | — | November 6, 2012 | Haleakala | Pan-STARRS 1 | · | 570 m | MPC · JPL |
| 677774 | 2017 DS_{25} | — | April 16, 2012 | Bergisch Gladbach | W. Bickel | · | 2.6 km | MPC · JPL |
| 677775 | 2017 DY_{25} | — | May 30, 2014 | Haleakala | Pan-STARRS 1 | (2076) | 890 m | MPC · JPL |
| 677776 | 2017 DQ_{26} | — | October 28, 1994 | Kitt Peak | Spacewatch | · | 1.4 km | MPC · JPL |
| 677777 | 2017 DP_{27} | — | July 1, 2014 | Haleakala | Pan-STARRS 1 | · | 2.2 km | MPC · JPL |
| 677778 | 2017 DH_{30} | — | January 30, 2006 | Kitt Peak | Spacewatch | · | 2.5 km | MPC · JPL |
| 677779 | 2017 DO_{30} | — | February 9, 2007 | Kitt Peak | Spacewatch | · | 610 m | MPC · JPL |
| 677780 | 2017 DG_{33} | — | December 6, 2005 | Kitt Peak | Spacewatch | · | 3.8 km | MPC · JPL |
| 677781 | 2017 DV_{34} | — | February 22, 2017 | Mount Lemmon | Mount Lemmon Survey | AMO | 160 m | MPC · JPL |
| 677782 | 2017 DH_{38} | — | June 7, 2013 | Haleakala | Pan-STARRS 1 | · | 3.0 km | MPC · JPL |
| 677783 | 2017 DN_{38} | — | September 26, 2003 | Apache Point | SDSS Collaboration | · | 2.9 km | MPC · JPL |
| 677784 | 2017 DQ_{38} | — | February 22, 2014 | Mount Lemmon | Mount Lemmon Survey | · | 600 m | MPC · JPL |
| 677785 | 2017 DO_{47} | — | July 7, 2014 | Haleakala | Pan-STARRS 1 | · | 1.5 km | MPC · JPL |
| 677786 | 2017 DT_{48} | — | October 29, 2005 | Mount Lemmon | Mount Lemmon Survey | · | 490 m | MPC · JPL |
| 677787 | 2017 DZ_{49} | — | November 7, 2012 | Haleakala | Pan-STARRS 1 | · | 610 m | MPC · JPL |
| 677788 | 2017 DH_{50} | — | November 1, 2010 | Mount Lemmon | Mount Lemmon Survey | NAE | 3.0 km | MPC · JPL |
| 677789 | 2017 DZ_{50} | — | September 28, 2009 | Kitt Peak | Spacewatch | · | 2.5 km | MPC · JPL |
| 677790 | 2017 DB_{53} | — | December 2, 2005 | Kitt Peak | Spacewatch | · | 1.9 km | MPC · JPL |
| 677791 | 2017 DU_{54} | — | January 17, 2007 | Kitt Peak | Spacewatch | · | 720 m | MPC · JPL |
| 677792 | 2017 DE_{55} | — | September 22, 2014 | Haleakala | Pan-STARRS 1 | EOS | 2.4 km | MPC · JPL |
| 677793 | 2017 DU_{55} | — | January 4, 2011 | Mount Lemmon | Mount Lemmon Survey | · | 3.1 km | MPC · JPL |
| 677794 | 2017 DW_{57} | — | September 19, 2015 | Haleakala | Pan-STARRS 1 | · | 2.4 km | MPC · JPL |
| 677795 | 2017 DQ_{58} | — | March 11, 2002 | Palomar | NEAT | · | 2.4 km | MPC · JPL |
| 677796 | 2017 DW_{58} | — | May 18, 2013 | Mount Lemmon | Mount Lemmon Survey | EOS | 1.8 km | MPC · JPL |
| 677797 | 2017 DH_{60} | — | March 12, 2008 | Mount Lemmon | Mount Lemmon Survey | HOF | 2.7 km | MPC · JPL |
| 677798 | 2017 DH_{61} | — | October 1, 2009 | Mount Lemmon | Mount Lemmon Survey | EOS | 2.4 km | MPC · JPL |
| 677799 | 2017 DT_{61} | — | November 16, 2003 | Kitt Peak | Spacewatch | · | 3.9 km | MPC · JPL |
| 677800 | 2017 DO_{63} | — | October 18, 2012 | Mount Lemmon | Mount Lemmon Survey | · | 600 m | MPC · JPL |

== 677801–677900 ==
back to top

| Designation | | | Discovery | | | Properties | | Ref |
| Permanent | Provisional | Named after | Date | Site | Discoverer(s) | Category | Diam. | Ref |
|---|---|---|---|---|---|---|---|---|
| 677801 | 2017 DQ_{63} | — | June 27, 2014 | Haleakala | Pan-STARRS 1 | · | 2.2 km | MPC · JPL |
| 677802 | 2017 DK_{64} | — | March 1, 2008 | Kitt Peak | Spacewatch | · | 2.1 km | MPC · JPL |
| 677803 | 2017 DN_{64} | — | March 7, 2013 | Mount Lemmon | Mount Lemmon Survey | · | 1.5 km | MPC · JPL |
| 677804 | 2017 DP_{71} | — | January 30, 2006 | Kitt Peak | Spacewatch | · | 2.0 km | MPC · JPL |
| 677805 | 2017 DQ_{72} | — | January 26, 2017 | Haleakala | Pan-STARRS 1 | EUN | 1.0 km | MPC · JPL |
| 677806 | 2017 DS_{72} | — | September 7, 2008 | Mount Lemmon | Mount Lemmon Survey | · | 3.0 km | MPC · JPL |
| 677807 | 2017 DC_{73} | — | February 17, 2010 | Mount Lemmon | Mount Lemmon Survey | · | 750 m | MPC · JPL |
| 677808 | 2017 DX_{73} | — | February 25, 2012 | Mount Lemmon | Mount Lemmon Survey | · | 2.4 km | MPC · JPL |
| 677809 | 2017 DY_{74} | — | May 10, 2007 | Mount Lemmon | Mount Lemmon Survey | (1338) (FLO) | 610 m | MPC · JPL |
| 677810 | 2017 DB_{77} | — | June 4, 2013 | Nogales | M. Schwartz, P. R. Holvorcem | · | 920 m | MPC · JPL |
| 677811 | 2017 DG_{77} | — | November 8, 2010 | Kitt Peak | Spacewatch | EOS | 2.1 km | MPC · JPL |
| 677812 | 2017 DL_{77} | — | January 4, 2017 | Mount Lemmon | Mount Lemmon Survey | PHO | 650 m | MPC · JPL |
| 677813 | 2017 DR_{77} | — | December 18, 2003 | Kitt Peak | Spacewatch | · | 1.6 km | MPC · JPL |
| 677814 | 2017 DW_{77} | — | December 2, 2016 | Mount Lemmon | Mount Lemmon Survey | · | 1.3 km | MPC · JPL |
| 677815 | 2017 DZ_{77} | — | December 6, 2010 | Mount Lemmon | Mount Lemmon Survey | · | 3.1 km | MPC · JPL |
| 677816 | 2017 DH_{78} | — | December 6, 2011 | Haleakala | Pan-STARRS 1 | · | 2.8 km | MPC · JPL |
| 677817 | 2017 DN_{79} | — | September 5, 2010 | Mount Lemmon | Mount Lemmon Survey | · | 1.9 km | MPC · JPL |
| 677818 | 2017 DB_{80} | — | October 9, 2015 | Haleakala | Pan-STARRS 1 | · | 3.2 km | MPC · JPL |
| 677819 | 2017 DO_{80} | — | October 24, 2005 | Mauna Kea | A. Boattini | · | 2.7 km | MPC · JPL |
| 677820 | 2017 DJ_{81} | — | April 10, 2013 | Mount Lemmon | Mount Lemmon Survey | DOR | 2.3 km | MPC · JPL |
| 677821 | 2017 DK_{81} | — | January 28, 2007 | Mount Lemmon | Mount Lemmon Survey | · | 2.4 km | MPC · JPL |
| 677822 | 2017 DN_{81} | — | September 26, 2013 | Mount Lemmon | Mount Lemmon Survey | H | 360 m | MPC · JPL |
| 677823 | 2017 DY_{81} | — | February 26, 2007 | Mount Lemmon | Mount Lemmon Survey | · | 2.4 km | MPC · JPL |
| 677824 | 2017 DA_{82} | — | October 30, 1997 | Mauna Kea | Veillet, C. | · | 2.2 km | MPC · JPL |
| 677825 | 2017 DD_{82} | — | September 28, 2009 | Mount Lemmon | Mount Lemmon Survey | · | 2.8 km | MPC · JPL |
| 677826 | 2017 DV_{84} | — | April 28, 2003 | Kitt Peak | Spacewatch | · | 900 m | MPC · JPL |
| 677827 | 2017 DG_{85} | — | February 2, 2006 | Mount Lemmon | Mount Lemmon Survey | · | 3.1 km | MPC · JPL |
| 677828 | 2017 DN_{87} | — | March 26, 2014 | Mount Lemmon | Mount Lemmon Survey | · | 670 m | MPC · JPL |
| 677829 | 2017 DS_{87} | — | March 14, 2007 | Mount Lemmon | Mount Lemmon Survey | EOS | 2.3 km | MPC · JPL |
| 677830 | 2017 DZ_{87} | — | March 15, 2007 | Catalina | CSS | · | 790 m | MPC · JPL |
| 677831 | 2017 DZ_{88} | — | October 22, 2003 | Apache Point | SDSS | TIR | 3.0 km | MPC · JPL |
| 677832 | 2017 DL_{89} | — | February 17, 2013 | Nogales | M. Schwartz, P. R. Holvorcem | · | 1.6 km | MPC · JPL |
| 677833 | 2017 DT_{89} | — | December 31, 2011 | Kitt Peak | Spacewatch | · | 1.9 km | MPC · JPL |
| 677834 | 2017 DY_{92} | — | December 18, 2009 | Mount Lemmon | Mount Lemmon Survey | · | 660 m | MPC · JPL |
| 677835 | 2017 DD_{93} | — | October 25, 2003 | Kitt Peak | Spacewatch | · | 3.1 km | MPC · JPL |
| 677836 | 2017 DS_{94} | — | March 5, 2013 | Haleakala | Pan-STARRS 1 | · | 1.5 km | MPC · JPL |
| 677837 | 2017 DF_{96} | — | January 19, 2005 | Kitt Peak | Spacewatch | · | 2.7 km | MPC · JPL |
| 677838 | 2017 DP_{99} | — | December 29, 1999 | Mauna Kea | Veillet, C. | · | 2.6 km | MPC · JPL |
| 677839 | 2017 DS_{100} | — | December 3, 2012 | Mount Lemmon | Mount Lemmon Survey | · | 680 m | MPC · JPL |
| 677840 | 2017 DX_{100} | — | December 9, 2010 | Mount Lemmon | Mount Lemmon Survey | · | 2.2 km | MPC · JPL |
| 677841 | 2017 DA_{102} | — | November 10, 2004 | Kitt Peak | Spacewatch | EOS | 2.1 km | MPC · JPL |
| 677842 | 2017 DC_{104} | — | December 18, 2009 | Mount Lemmon | Mount Lemmon Survey | · | 860 m | MPC · JPL |
| 677843 | 2017 DQ_{105} | — | March 12, 2007 | Kitt Peak | Spacewatch | · | 1.4 km | MPC · JPL |
| 677844 | 2017 DS_{105} | — | November 16, 2006 | Mount Lemmon | Mount Lemmon Survey | · | 820 m | MPC · JPL |
| 677845 | 2017 DT_{105} | — | December 13, 2010 | Kitt Peak | Spacewatch | · | 2.8 km | MPC · JPL |
| 677846 | 2017 DC_{106} | — | March 12, 2007 | Kitt Peak | Spacewatch | · | 610 m | MPC · JPL |
| 677847 | 2017 DD_{106} | — | September 24, 2005 | Kitt Peak | Spacewatch | · | 750 m | MPC · JPL |
| 677848 | 2017 DF_{106} | — | August 7, 2008 | Kitt Peak | Spacewatch | · | 870 m | MPC · JPL |
| 677849 | 2017 DS_{106} | — | August 12, 2015 | Haleakala | Pan-STARRS 1 | · | 2.8 km | MPC · JPL |
| 677850 | 2017 DB_{107} | — | June 30, 2008 | Kitt Peak | Spacewatch | · | 2.2 km | MPC · JPL |
| 677851 | 2017 DW_{109} | — | December 3, 2010 | Mount Lemmon | Mount Lemmon Survey | EOS | 1.8 km | MPC · JPL |
| 677852 | 2017 DW_{110} | — | June 15, 2010 | Mount Lemmon | Mount Lemmon Survey | · | 1.7 km | MPC · JPL |
| 677853 | 2017 DX_{110} | — | March 18, 2010 | Mount Lemmon | Mount Lemmon Survey | PHO | 650 m | MPC · JPL |
| 677854 | 2017 DE_{111} | — | March 16, 2007 | Catalina | CSS | · | 3.0 km | MPC · JPL |
| 677855 | 2017 DF_{111} | — | February 7, 2011 | Mount Lemmon | Mount Lemmon Survey | · | 3.1 km | MPC · JPL |
| 677856 | 2017 DN_{111} | — | December 27, 2016 | Mount Lemmon | Mount Lemmon Survey | PHO | 770 m | MPC · JPL |
| 677857 | 2017 DV_{111} | — | January 28, 2017 | Haleakala | Pan-STARRS 1 | · | 3.0 km | MPC · JPL |
| 677858 | 2017 DS_{112} | — | March 31, 2008 | Mount Lemmon | Mount Lemmon Survey | · | 1.8 km | MPC · JPL |
| 677859 | 2017 DT_{113} | — | October 12, 2010 | Mount Lemmon | Mount Lemmon Survey | · | 2.3 km | MPC · JPL |
| 677860 | 2017 DH_{114} | — | November 13, 2006 | Mount Lemmon | Mount Lemmon Survey | · | 2.1 km | MPC · JPL |
| 677861 | 2017 DL_{115} | — | January 2, 2017 | Haleakala | Pan-STARRS 1 | PHO | 600 m | MPC · JPL |
| 677862 | 2017 DD_{116} | — | January 7, 2006 | Kitt Peak | Spacewatch | · | 2.9 km | MPC · JPL |
| 677863 | 2017 DM_{116} | — | October 7, 2010 | Catalina | CSS | · | 2.6 km | MPC · JPL |
| 677864 | 2017 DU_{116} | — | January 4, 2017 | Haleakala | Pan-STARRS 1 | · | 1.2 km | MPC · JPL |
| 677865 | 2017 DY_{116} | — | December 6, 2011 | Haleakala | Pan-STARRS 1 | EOS | 2.0 km | MPC · JPL |
| 677866 | 2017 DH_{117} | — | September 30, 2003 | Kitt Peak | Spacewatch | · | 2.7 km | MPC · JPL |
| 677867 | 2017 DK_{118} | — | December 16, 2007 | Socorro | LINEAR | JUN | 880 m | MPC · JPL |
| 677868 | 2017 DS_{118} | — | October 1, 2014 | Haleakala | Pan-STARRS 1 | · | 3.0 km | MPC · JPL |
| 677869 | 2017 DQ_{119} | — | November 17, 2012 | Mount Lemmon | Mount Lemmon Survey | · | 640 m | MPC · JPL |
| 677870 | 2017 DM_{120} | — | August 8, 2015 | Haleakala | Pan-STARRS 1 | H | 360 m | MPC · JPL |
| 677871 | 2017 DP_{120} | — | January 10, 2013 | Haleakala | Pan-STARRS 1 | · | 860 m | MPC · JPL |
| 677872 | 2017 DW_{120} | — | May 14, 2008 | Mount Lemmon | Mount Lemmon Survey | · | 1.5 km | MPC · JPL |
| 677873 | 2017 DX_{120} | — | February 28, 2006 | Catalina | CSS | · | 3.0 km | MPC · JPL |
| 677874 | 2017 DK_{121} | — | January 14, 2011 | Kitt Peak | Spacewatch | · | 1.9 km | MPC · JPL |
| 677875 | 2017 DA_{130} | — | February 22, 2017 | Haleakala | Pan-STARRS 1 | · | 1.4 km | MPC · JPL |
| 677876 | 2017 DR_{131} | — | April 23, 2014 | Cerro Tololo-DECam | DECam | · | 480 m | MPC · JPL |
| 677877 | 2017 DW_{139} | — | February 21, 2017 | Haleakala | Pan-STARRS 1 | · | 810 m | MPC · JPL |
| 677878 | 2017 ES_{4} | — | December 19, 2007 | Mount Lemmon | Mount Lemmon Survey | · | 1.9 km | MPC · JPL |
| 677879 | 2017 ED_{5} | — | November 25, 2009 | Kitt Peak | Spacewatch | · | 3.7 km | MPC · JPL |
| 677880 | 2017 EU_{5} | — | March 12, 2010 | Catalina | CSS | · | 770 m | MPC · JPL |
| 677881 | 2017 EV_{6} | — | February 25, 2007 | Kitt Peak | Spacewatch | · | 610 m | MPC · JPL |
| 677882 | 2017 ED_{7} | — | February 18, 2010 | Kitt Peak | Spacewatch | · | 650 m | MPC · JPL |
| 677883 | 2017 EG_{7} | — | January 11, 2011 | Mount Lemmon | Mount Lemmon Survey | · | 3.3 km | MPC · JPL |
| 677884 | 2017 EJ_{7} | — | July 28, 2015 | Haleakala | Pan-STARRS 1 | · | 1.9 km | MPC · JPL |
| 677885 | 2017 EJ_{11} | — | November 23, 2009 | Mount Lemmon | Mount Lemmon Survey | EOS | 2.2 km | MPC · JPL |
| 677886 | 2017 EW_{11} | — | March 12, 2013 | Mount Lemmon | Mount Lemmon Survey | PHO | 580 m | MPC · JPL |
| 677887 | 2017 EZ_{11} | — | February 4, 2006 | Kitt Peak | Spacewatch | EOS | 2.0 km | MPC · JPL |
| 677888 | 2017 EV_{13} | — | September 26, 2005 | Kitt Peak | Spacewatch | · | 560 m | MPC · JPL |
| 677889 | 2017 EG_{14} | — | March 19, 2010 | Catalina | CSS | · | 560 m | MPC · JPL |
| 677890 | 2017 EO_{14} | — | November 24, 2012 | Kitt Peak | Spacewatch | · | 670 m | MPC · JPL |
| 677891 | 2017 ER_{14} | — | April 25, 2007 | Mount Lemmon | Mount Lemmon Survey | · | 2.6 km | MPC · JPL |
| 677892 | 2017 EJ_{16} | — | July 1, 2014 | Haleakala | Pan-STARRS 1 | · | 820 m | MPC · JPL |
| 677893 | 2017 ET_{16} | — | April 21, 2010 | Kitt Peak | Spacewatch | · | 940 m | MPC · JPL |
| 677894 | 2017 EK_{17} | — | July 7, 2014 | Haleakala | Pan-STARRS 1 | · | 950 m | MPC · JPL |
| 677895 | 2017 ES_{17} | — | February 21, 2017 | Haleakala | Pan-STARRS 1 | · | 670 m | MPC · JPL |
| 677896 | 2017 EU_{17} | — | January 16, 2013 | Haleakala | Pan-STARRS 1 | · | 830 m | MPC · JPL |
| 677897 | 2017 EC_{19} | — | January 26, 2011 | Catalina | CSS | · | 3.4 km | MPC · JPL |
| 677898 | 2017 EV_{20} | — | February 1, 2006 | Kitt Peak | Spacewatch | · | 2.7 km | MPC · JPL |
| 677899 | 2017 EW_{21} | — | April 14, 2010 | Mount Lemmon | Mount Lemmon Survey | · | 930 m | MPC · JPL |
| 677900 | 2017 EZ_{21} | — | March 25, 2010 | Mount Lemmon | Mount Lemmon Survey | · | 1.1 km | MPC · JPL |

== 677901–678000 ==
back to top

| Designation | | | Discovery | | | Properties | | Ref |
| Permanent | Provisional | Named after | Date | Site | Discoverer(s) | Category | Diam. | Ref |
|---|---|---|---|---|---|---|---|---|
| 677901 | 2017 ED_{22} | — | December 10, 2010 | Mount Lemmon | Mount Lemmon Survey | EUP | 3.0 km | MPC · JPL |
| 677902 | 2017 EZ_{22} | — | February 27, 2012 | Haleakala | Pan-STARRS 1 | H | 460 m | MPC · JPL |
| 677903 | 2017 EM_{23} | — | December 4, 2005 | Kitt Peak | Spacewatch | · | 800 m | MPC · JPL |
| 677904 | 2017 EY_{28} | — | March 5, 2017 | Haleakala | Pan-STARRS 1 | · | 940 m | MPC · JPL |
| 677905 | 2017 EF_{29} | — | March 4, 2017 | Haleakala | Pan-STARRS 1 | NYS | 710 m | MPC · JPL |
| 677906 | 2017 EH_{29} | — | March 4, 2017 | Haleakala | Pan-STARRS 1 | · | 2.5 km | MPC · JPL |
| 677907 | 2017 FM_{3} | — | July 19, 2007 | Siding Spring | SSS | · | 4.1 km | MPC · JPL |
| 677908 | 2017 FU_{3} | — | October 23, 2009 | Kitt Peak | Spacewatch | · | 2.2 km | MPC · JPL |
| 677909 | 2017 FL_{5} | — | February 25, 2006 | Mount Lemmon | Mount Lemmon Survey | · | 2.3 km | MPC · JPL |
| 677910 | 2017 FZ_{8} | — | December 18, 2009 | Kitt Peak | Spacewatch | (883) | 700 m | MPC · JPL |
| 677911 | 2017 FA_{10} | — | December 19, 2004 | Mount Lemmon | Mount Lemmon Survey | EOS | 2.4 km | MPC · JPL |
| 677912 | 2017 FC_{11} | — | February 22, 2017 | Mount Lemmon | Mount Lemmon Survey | · | 700 m | MPC · JPL |
| 677913 | 2017 FP_{11} | — | October 18, 2009 | Mount Lemmon | Mount Lemmon Survey | EOS | 1.8 km | MPC · JPL |
| 677914 | 2017 FY_{11} | — | November 19, 2003 | Anderson Mesa | LONEOS | · | 3.7 km | MPC · JPL |
| 677915 | 2017 FV_{12} | — | July 7, 2014 | Haleakala | Pan-STARRS 1 | · | 1.9 km | MPC · JPL |
| 677916 | 2017 FY_{12} | — | February 8, 2011 | Mount Lemmon | Mount Lemmon Survey | · | 2.9 km | MPC · JPL |
| 677917 | 2017 FA_{13} | — | September 20, 2011 | Haleakala | Pan-STARRS 1 | V | 560 m | MPC · JPL |
| 677918 | 2017 FS_{13} | — | March 14, 2007 | Mount Lemmon | Mount Lemmon Survey | V | 630 m | MPC · JPL |
| 677919 | 2017 FX_{13} | — | March 4, 2017 | Haleakala | Pan-STARRS 1 | · | 810 m | MPC · JPL |
| 677920 | 2017 FG_{14} | — | April 24, 2007 | Kitt Peak | Spacewatch | EOS | 1.8 km | MPC · JPL |
| 677921 | 2017 FU_{14} | — | March 13, 2010 | Mount Lemmon | Mount Lemmon Survey | · | 620 m | MPC · JPL |
| 677922 | 2017 FB_{15} | — | February 27, 2006 | Kitt Peak | Spacewatch | · | 2.7 km | MPC · JPL |
| 677923 | 2017 FG_{16} | — | February 29, 2004 | Kitt Peak | Spacewatch | · | 610 m | MPC · JPL |
| 677924 | 2017 FK_{20} | — | February 9, 2011 | Mount Lemmon | Mount Lemmon Survey | · | 2.5 km | MPC · JPL |
| 677925 | 2017 FC_{21} | — | February 24, 2006 | Kitt Peak | Spacewatch | HYG | 2.3 km | MPC · JPL |
| 677926 | 2017 FJ_{21} | — | January 17, 2013 | Haleakala | Pan-STARRS 1 | · | 910 m | MPC · JPL |
| 677927 | 2017 FO_{23} | — | December 6, 2012 | Mount Lemmon | Mount Lemmon Survey | · | 590 m | MPC · JPL |
| 677928 | 2017 FT_{23} | — | March 6, 2011 | Mount Lemmon | Mount Lemmon Survey | · | 3.1 km | MPC · JPL |
| 677929 | 2017 FB_{24} | — | January 7, 2006 | Mount Lemmon | Mount Lemmon Survey | · | 2.5 km | MPC · JPL |
| 677930 | 2017 FC_{24} | — | October 8, 2015 | Haleakala | Pan-STARRS 1 | V | 500 m | MPC · JPL |
| 677931 | 2017 FK_{24} | — | September 15, 2009 | Kitt Peak | Spacewatch | · | 2.2 km | MPC · JPL |
| 677932 | 2017 FV_{24} | — | October 24, 2009 | Kitt Peak | Spacewatch | · | 2.6 km | MPC · JPL |
| 677933 | 2017 FR_{25} | — | March 8, 2005 | Mount Lemmon | Mount Lemmon Survey | · | 3.1 km | MPC · JPL |
| 677934 | 2017 FF_{26} | — | February 1, 2013 | Haleakala | Pan-STARRS 1 | · | 820 m | MPC · JPL |
| 677935 | 2017 FA_{27} | — | September 29, 2009 | Mount Lemmon | Mount Lemmon Survey | · | 2.1 km | MPC · JPL |
| 677936 | 2017 FJ_{27} | — | February 1, 2006 | Kitt Peak | Spacewatch | · | 3.1 km | MPC · JPL |
| 677937 | 2017 FE_{29} | — | October 6, 2008 | Mount Lemmon | Mount Lemmon Survey | · | 790 m | MPC · JPL |
| 677938 | 2017 FK_{30} | — | March 2, 2006 | Mount Lemmon | Mount Lemmon Survey | · | 2.7 km | MPC · JPL |
| 677939 | 2017 FW_{32} | — | September 28, 2008 | Mount Lemmon | Mount Lemmon Survey | VER | 2.4 km | MPC · JPL |
| 677940 | 2017 FS_{33} | — | September 23, 2015 | Haleakala | Pan-STARRS 1 | EOS | 1.5 km | MPC · JPL |
| 677941 | 2017 FQ_{34} | — | September 23, 2009 | Kitt Peak | Spacewatch | · | 2.5 km | MPC · JPL |
| 677942 | 2017 FE_{35} | — | September 12, 2015 | Haleakala | Pan-STARRS 1 | NYS | 690 m | MPC · JPL |
| 677943 | 2017 FX_{35} | — | October 8, 2008 | Mount Lemmon | Mount Lemmon Survey | ELF | 3.7 km | MPC · JPL |
| 677944 | 2017 FY_{36} | — | December 1, 2005 | Kitt Peak | Wasserman, L. H., Millis, R. L. | · | 3.3 km | MPC · JPL |
| 677945 | 2017 FY_{37} | — | October 3, 2003 | Kitt Peak | Spacewatch | · | 2.9 km | MPC · JPL |
| 677946 | 2017 FA_{38} | — | June 27, 2011 | Mount Lemmon | Mount Lemmon Survey | · | 840 m | MPC · JPL |
| 677947 | 2017 FN_{38} | — | January 5, 2013 | Mount Lemmon | Mount Lemmon Survey | · | 660 m | MPC · JPL |
| 677948 | 2017 FV_{38} | — | April 15, 2013 | Haleakala | Pan-STARRS 1 | · | 1.5 km | MPC · JPL |
| 677949 | 2017 FD_{39} | — | March 25, 2007 | Mount Lemmon | Mount Lemmon Survey | · | 2.1 km | MPC · JPL |
| 677950 | 2017 FZ_{39} | — | August 23, 1998 | Kitt Peak | Spacewatch | · | 1.9 km | MPC · JPL |
| 677951 | 2017 FL_{40} | — | April 25, 2003 | Kitt Peak | Spacewatch | · | 890 m | MPC · JPL |
| 677952 | 2017 FU_{40} | — | April 20, 2010 | Mount Lemmon | Mount Lemmon Survey | V | 590 m | MPC · JPL |
| 677953 | 2017 FZ_{40} | — | February 25, 2011 | Mount Lemmon | Mount Lemmon Survey | VER | 2.6 km | MPC · JPL |
| 677954 | 2017 FA_{41} | — | November 19, 2008 | Mount Lemmon | Mount Lemmon Survey | · | 700 m | MPC · JPL |
| 677955 | 2017 FE_{41} | — | September 27, 2009 | Mount Lemmon | Mount Lemmon Survey | · | 2.2 km | MPC · JPL |
| 677956 | 2017 FN_{41} | — | March 6, 2006 | Kitt Peak | Spacewatch | · | 2.2 km | MPC · JPL |
| 677957 | 2017 FJ_{42} | — | February 26, 2011 | Mount Lemmon | Mount Lemmon Survey | · | 2.9 km | MPC · JPL |
| 677958 | 2017 FM_{42} | — | September 17, 2003 | Kitt Peak | Spacewatch | (21885) | 2.7 km | MPC · JPL |
| 677959 | 2017 FJ_{44} | — | May 14, 2012 | Haleakala | Pan-STARRS 1 | VER | 2.8 km | MPC · JPL |
| 677960 | 2017 FM_{44} | — | February 8, 2011 | Mount Lemmon | Mount Lemmon Survey | · | 2.6 km | MPC · JPL |
| 677961 | 2017 FS_{44} | — | August 19, 2015 | Kitt Peak | Spacewatch | · | 600 m | MPC · JPL |
| 677962 | 2017 FL_{45} | — | October 18, 2001 | Palomar | NEAT | · | 2.0 km | MPC · JPL |
| 677963 | 2017 FK_{47} | — | February 21, 2017 | Haleakala | Pan-STARRS 1 | · | 710 m | MPC · JPL |
| 677964 | 2017 FP_{49} | — | December 19, 2009 | Kitt Peak | Spacewatch | · | 2.7 km | MPC · JPL |
| 677965 | 2017 FR_{49} | — | November 9, 1999 | Kitt Peak | Spacewatch | · | 1.6 km | MPC · JPL |
| 677966 | 2017 FN_{50} | — | March 13, 2010 | Mount Lemmon | Mount Lemmon Survey | · | 1.0 km | MPC · JPL |
| 677967 | 2017 FF_{51} | — | September 18, 2014 | Haleakala | Pan-STARRS 1 | · | 3.1 km | MPC · JPL |
| 677968 | 2017 FV_{53} | — | May 10, 2014 | Haleakala | Pan-STARRS 1 | · | 690 m | MPC · JPL |
| 677969 | 2017 FA_{55} | — | January 10, 2011 | Mount Lemmon | Mount Lemmon Survey | · | 2.4 km | MPC · JPL |
| 677970 | 2017 FN_{55} | — | December 15, 2010 | Mount Lemmon | Mount Lemmon Survey | · | 2.3 km | MPC · JPL |
| 677971 | 2017 FA_{58} | — | November 23, 2003 | Kitt Peak | Spacewatch | · | 3.1 km | MPC · JPL |
| 677972 | 2017 FH_{60} | — | March 4, 2017 | Haleakala | Pan-STARRS 1 | · | 740 m | MPC · JPL |
| 677973 | 2017 FQ_{62} | — | February 5, 2013 | Mount Lemmon | Mount Lemmon Survey | · | 830 m | MPC · JPL |
| 677974 | 2017 FU_{62} | — | March 12, 2011 | Mount Lemmon | Mount Lemmon Survey | · | 3.3 km | MPC · JPL |
| 677975 | 2017 FJ_{64} | — | December 16, 2011 | Haleakala | Pan-STARRS 1 | · | 500 m | MPC · JPL |
| 677976 | 2017 FN_{66} | — | February 22, 2017 | Mount Lemmon | Mount Lemmon Survey | · | 1.2 km | MPC · JPL |
| 677977 | 2017 FY_{66} | — | March 25, 2007 | Mount Lemmon | Mount Lemmon Survey | EOS | 1.9 km | MPC · JPL |
| 677978 | 2017 FL_{67} | — | December 5, 2005 | Mount Lemmon | Mount Lemmon Survey | EOS | 1.8 km | MPC · JPL |
| 677979 | 2017 FR_{67} | — | November 22, 2009 | Kitt Peak | Spacewatch | · | 3.2 km | MPC · JPL |
| 677980 | 2017 FE_{68} | — | March 21, 2012 | Catalina | CSS | · | 2.1 km | MPC · JPL |
| 677981 | 2017 FW_{69} | — | February 7, 2002 | Kitt Peak | Spacewatch | · | 1.8 km | MPC · JPL |
| 677982 | 2017 FY_{69} | — | January 8, 2006 | Mount Lemmon | Mount Lemmon Survey | · | 2.2 km | MPC · JPL |
| 677983 | 2017 FY_{71} | — | October 11, 2010 | Mount Lemmon | Mount Lemmon Survey | · | 2.4 km | MPC · JPL |
| 677984 | 2017 FQ_{72} | — | October 13, 2006 | Kitt Peak | Spacewatch | · | 1.4 km | MPC · JPL |
| 677985 | 2017 FQ_{73} | — | December 30, 2005 | Kitt Peak | Spacewatch | · | 1.8 km | MPC · JPL |
| 677986 | 2017 FA_{78} | — | April 22, 2012 | Kitt Peak | Spacewatch | · | 1.9 km | MPC · JPL |
| 677987 | 2017 FG_{78} | — | October 14, 2001 | Kitt Peak | Spacewatch | · | 670 m | MPC · JPL |
| 677988 | 2017 FY_{81} | — | March 26, 2007 | Kitt Peak | Spacewatch | · | 560 m | MPC · JPL |
| 677989 | 2017 FD_{82} | — | December 1, 2005 | Mount Lemmon | Mount Lemmon Survey | · | 2.1 km | MPC · JPL |
| 677990 | 2017 FK_{82} | — | September 22, 2009 | Mount Lemmon | Mount Lemmon Survey | · | 1.9 km | MPC · JPL |
| 677991 | 2017 FA_{83} | — | December 11, 2007 | Cerro Burek | Burek, Cerro | · | 1.5 km | MPC · JPL |
| 677992 | 2017 FC_{85} | — | December 5, 2005 | Kitt Peak | Spacewatch | · | 730 m | MPC · JPL |
| 677993 | 2017 FO_{85} | — | March 16, 2007 | Kitt Peak | Spacewatch | · | 2.0 km | MPC · JPL |
| 677994 | 2017 FB_{87} | — | December 18, 1999 | Kitt Peak | Spacewatch | · | 2.8 km | MPC · JPL |
| 677995 | 2017 FG_{87} | — | May 17, 2012 | Mount Lemmon | Mount Lemmon Survey | · | 3.4 km | MPC · JPL |
| 677996 | 2017 FP_{87} | — | August 20, 2007 | Bergisch Gladbach | W. Bickel | · | 2.4 km | MPC · JPL |
| 677997 | 2017 FF_{89} | — | September 14, 2009 | Kitt Peak | Spacewatch | · | 2.0 km | MPC · JPL |
| 677998 | 2017 FL_{89} | — | April 23, 2013 | Mount Lemmon | Mount Lemmon Survey | HNS | 970 m | MPC · JPL |
| 677999 | 2017 FB_{92} | — | October 31, 2005 | Mount Lemmon | Mount Lemmon Survey | · | 740 m | MPC · JPL |
| 678000 | 2017 FE_{92} | — | May 15, 2012 | Mount Lemmon | Mount Lemmon Survey | · | 2.9 km | MPC · JPL |

back to top

== Meaning of names ==
As minor planet discoveries are confirmed, they are given a permanent number by the IAU's Minor Planet Center (MPC), and the discoverers can then submit names for them, following the IAU's naming conventions. The list below concerns those minor planets in the specified number-range that have received names, and explains the meanings of those names.

Official naming citations of newly named small Solar System bodies are approved and published in a bulletin by IAU's Working Group for Small Bodies Nomenclature (WGSBN). Before May 2021, citations were published in MPC's Minor Planet Circulars for many decades. Recent citations can also be found on the JPL Small-Body Database (SBDB). Until his death in 2016, German astronomer Lutz D. Schmadel compiled these citations into the Dictionary of Minor Planet Names (DMP) and regularly updated the collection.

Based on Paul Herget's The Names of the Minor Planets, Schmadel also researched the unclear origin of numerous asteroids, most of which had been named prior to World War II. This article incorporates text from this source, which is in the public domain: SBDB New namings may only be added to this list below after official publication as the preannouncement of names is condemned. The WGSBN publishes a comprehensive guideline for the naming rules of non-cometary small Solar System bodies.

| Named minor planet | Provisional | This minor planet was named for... | Ref · Catalog |
|---|---|---|---|
| 677772 Bettonvil | 2017 DA_{23} | Felix Bettonvil (b. 1966), a Dutch engineer and project manager of the NOVA Optical IR Group at Leiden Observatory and ASTRON. | IAU · 677772 |
