= List of minor planets: 540001–541000 =

The following is a partial list of minor planets, running from minor-planet number 540001 through 541000, inclusive. The primary data for this and other partial lists is based on JPL's "Small-Body Orbital Elements" and data available from the Minor Planet Center. Critical list information is also provided by the MPC, unless otherwise specified from Lowell Observatory. A detailed description of the table's columns and additional sources are given on the main page including a complete list of every page in this series, and a statistical break-up on the dynamical classification of minor planets.

Also see the summary list of all named bodies in numerical and alphabetical order, and the corresponding naming citations for the number range of this particular list. New namings may only be added to this list after official publication, as the preannouncement of names is condemned by the Working Group for Small Bodies Nomenclature of the International Astronomical Union.

Near-Earth obj.	MBA (inner)	MBA (outer)	Centaur
Mars-crosser	MBA (middle)	Jupiter trojan	Trans-Neptunian obj.
Unclassified

== 540001–540100 ==
Designation			Discovery			Properties		Ref
Permanent	Provisional	Named after	Date	Site	Discoverer(s)	Category	Diam.	Ref
540001	2017 KQ_{13}	—	October 19, 2011	Kitt Peak	Spacewatch	·	1.1 km	MPC · JPL
540002	2017 KX_{14}	—	June 27, 2014	Haleakala	Pan-STARRS 1	·	610 m	MPC · JPL
540003	2017 KH_{16}	—	October 13, 2010	Mount Lemmon	Mount Lemmon Survey	·	1.9 km	MPC · JPL
540004	2017 KM_{19}	—	February 5, 2016	Haleakala	Pan-STARRS 1	·	2.3 km	MPC · JPL
540005	2017 KT_{19}	—	August 20, 2014	Haleakala	Pan-STARRS 1	·	890 m	MPC · JPL
540006	2017 KE_{20}	—	May 11, 2003	Kitt Peak	Spacewatch	·	2.1 km	MPC · JPL
540007	2017 KW_{20}	—	May 9, 2000	Socorro	LINEAR	·	1.8 km	MPC · JPL
540008	2017 KX_{25}	—	October 5, 2013	Kitt Peak	Spacewatch	(5651)	2.3 km	MPC · JPL
540009	2017 KE_{27}	—	December 7, 2010	Mount Lemmon	Mount Lemmon Survey	H	380 m	MPC · JPL
540010	2017 KH_{27}	—	July 14, 2004	Siding Spring	SSS	H	550 m	MPC · JPL
540011	2017 KU_{27}	—	May 16, 2013	Haleakala	Pan-STARRS 1	·	1.1 km	MPC · JPL
540012	2017 KY_{28}	—	August 16, 2009	Catalina	CSS	·	1.5 km	MPC · JPL
540013	2017 KQ_{29}	—	March 23, 2006	Kitt Peak	Spacewatch	NYS	1.2 km	MPC · JPL
540014	2017 KP_{30}	—	December 31, 2007	Mount Lemmon	Mount Lemmon Survey	·	1.2 km	MPC · JPL
540015	2017 KE_{31}	—	September 14, 2007	Siding Spring	SSS	H	530 m	MPC · JPL
540016	2017 KG_{31}	—	January 6, 1998	Kitt Peak	Spacewatch	H	450 m	MPC · JPL
540017	2017 KH_{32}	—	January 26, 2014	Haleakala	Pan-STARRS 1	H	440 m	MPC · JPL
540018	2017 KH_{33}	—	September 24, 2005	Kitt Peak	Spacewatch	·	1.5 km	MPC · JPL
540019	2017 KY_{33}	—	October 4, 2007	Mount Lemmon	Mount Lemmon Survey	·	2.2 km	MPC · JPL
540020	2017 KC_{34}	—	January 31, 2003	Socorro	LINEAR	·	2.9 km	MPC · JPL
540021	2017 KH_{34}	—	January 10, 2014	Catalina	CSS	H	560 m	MPC · JPL
540022	2017 KE_{36}	—	November 23, 2009	Mount Lemmon	Mount Lemmon Survey	·	2.8 km	MPC · JPL
540023	2017 KB_{37}	—	August 26, 2013	Haleakala	Pan-STARRS 1	·	1.5 km	MPC · JPL
540024	2017 KD_{37}	—	October 12, 2007	Mount Lemmon	Mount Lemmon Survey	·	3.2 km	MPC · JPL
540025	2017 KE_{37}	—	November 24, 2011	Haleakala	Pan-STARRS 1	·	730 m	MPC · JPL
540026	2017 KQ_{37}	—	November 28, 2013	Mount Lemmon	Mount Lemmon Survey	TIR	2.4 km	MPC · JPL
540027	2017 LA_{1}	—	December 5, 2005	Catalina	CSS	H	480 m	MPC · JPL
540028	2017 LX_{1}	—	January 12, 2011	Kitt Peak	Spacewatch	·	2.6 km	MPC · JPL
540029	2017 MJ_{1}	—	February 26, 2012	Kitt Peak	Spacewatch	·	1.3 km	MPC · JPL
540030	2017 MT_{2}	—	January 31, 2009	Mount Lemmon	Mount Lemmon Survey	H	510 m	MPC · JPL
540031	2017 MX_{3}	—	May 22, 2013	Mount Lemmon	Mount Lemmon Survey	·	1.5 km	MPC · JPL
540032	2017 MK_{5}	—	December 18, 2014	Haleakala	Pan-STARRS 1	·	3.5 km	MPC · JPL
540033	2017 MQ_{6}	—	November 29, 2005	Mount Lemmon	Mount Lemmon Survey	H	380 m	MPC · JPL
540034	2017 MG_{8}	—	December 7, 2010	Mount Lemmon	Mount Lemmon Survey	H	480 m	MPC · JPL
540035	2017 MF_{9}	—	January 29, 2014	Mount Lemmon	Mount Lemmon Survey	H	550 m	MPC · JPL
540036	2017 MH_{9}	—	August 28, 2005	Siding Spring	SSS	·	1.8 km	MPC · JPL
540037	2017 MO_{9}	—	September 22, 2009	Catalina	CSS	·	1.1 km	MPC · JPL
540038	2017 MY_{9}	—	May 16, 2013	Haleakala	Pan-STARRS 1	·	1.1 km	MPC · JPL
540039	2017 MA_{10}	—	February 9, 2008	Siding Spring	SSS	·	2.8 km	MPC · JPL
540040	2017 MC_{10}	—	May 22, 2006	Kitt Peak	Spacewatch	·	810 m	MPC · JPL
540041	2017 NN_{1}	—	September 26, 2013	Mount Lemmon	Mount Lemmon Survey	·	2.2 km	MPC · JPL
540042	2017 NS_{1}	—	October 7, 2007	Kitt Peak	Spacewatch	·	2.2 km	MPC · JPL
540043	2017 NA_{2}	—	October 31, 2010	Mount Lemmon	Mount Lemmon Survey	T_{j} (2.99) · 3:2 · SHU	3.6 km	MPC · JPL
540044	2017 NX_{2}	—	February 10, 1999	Kitt Peak	Spacewatch	·	2.3 km	MPC · JPL
540045	2017 NB_{3}	—	February 10, 2011	Mount Lemmon	Mount Lemmon Survey	·	1.1 km	MPC · JPL
540046	2017 NG_{3}	—	January 17, 2015	Haleakala	Pan-STARRS 1	BAR	1.1 km	MPC · JPL
540047	2017 NK_{4}	—	September 14, 2013	Haleakala	Pan-STARRS 1	·	1.3 km	MPC · JPL
540048	2017 NZ_{4}	—	October 15, 2012	Catalina	CSS	·	3.4 km	MPC · JPL
540049	2017 ND_{5}	—	June 3, 2008	Kitt Peak	Spacewatch	EUN	1.1 km	MPC · JPL
540050	2017 NJ_{5}	—	August 8, 2004	Socorro	LINEAR	·	1.5 km	MPC · JPL
540051	2017 ND_{6}	—	October 12, 2015	Mount Lemmon	Mount Lemmon Survey	H	510 m	MPC · JPL
540052	2017 OH_{2}	—	September 16, 2013	Mount Lemmon	Mount Lemmon Survey	JUN	940 m	MPC · JPL
540053	2017 OY_{2}	—	July 27, 1995	Kitt Peak	Spacewatch	·	3.0 km	MPC · JPL
540054	2017 OT_{5}	—	January 22, 2002	Socorro	LINEAR	·	1.4 km	MPC · JPL
540055	2017 OU_{5}	—	January 21, 2015	Haleakala	Pan-STARRS 1	·	3.2 km	MPC · JPL
540056	2017 OB_{6}	—	June 8, 2005	Kitt Peak	Spacewatch	·	1.2 km	MPC · JPL
540057	2017 OT_{6}	—	January 19, 2008	Kitt Peak	Spacewatch	·	780 m	MPC · JPL
540058	2017 OA_{7}	—	November 30, 2014	Haleakala	Pan-STARRS 1	·	2.0 km	MPC · JPL
540059	2017 OD_{8}	—	January 17, 2009	Mount Lemmon	Mount Lemmon Survey	·	2.8 km	MPC · JPL
540060	2017 OZ_{8}	—	April 29, 2006	Kitt Peak	Spacewatch	EOS	1.9 km	MPC · JPL
540061	2017 OV_{9}	—	November 22, 2008	Kitt Peak	Spacewatch	·	2.2 km	MPC · JPL
540062	2017 ON_{10}	—	July 29, 2008	Mount Lemmon	Mount Lemmon Survey	·	2.2 km	MPC · JPL
540063	2017 OY_{10}	—	September 25, 2006	Kitt Peak	Spacewatch	·	3.7 km	MPC · JPL
540064	2017 OF_{11}	—	December 31, 2008	Kitt Peak	Spacewatch	EOS	1.8 km	MPC · JPL
540065	2017 OO_{11}	—	August 27, 2006	Kitt Peak	Spacewatch	·	2.1 km	MPC · JPL
540066	2017 OS_{11}	—	January 29, 2000	Kitt Peak	Spacewatch	V	670 m	MPC · JPL
540067	2017 OG_{12}	—	September 6, 2013	Mount Lemmon	Mount Lemmon Survey	·	1.6 km	MPC · JPL
540068	2017 OE_{14}	—	July 6, 2005	Kitt Peak	Spacewatch	·	1.1 km	MPC · JPL
540069	2017 OV_{14}	—	January 15, 2004	Kitt Peak	Spacewatch	EOS	2.0 km	MPC · JPL
540070	2017 OX_{14}	—	December 21, 2014	Mount Lemmon	Mount Lemmon Survey	KOR	1.3 km	MPC · JPL
540071	2017 ON_{16}	—	February 1, 2009	Kitt Peak	Spacewatch	·	2.8 km	MPC · JPL
540072	2017 OA_{17}	—	July 12, 2013	Haleakala	Pan-STARRS 1	·	1.1 km	MPC · JPL
540073	2017 OW_{17}	—	March 23, 2015	Haleakala	Pan-STARRS 1	·	2.8 km	MPC · JPL
540074	2017 ON_{20}	—	May 2, 2016	Haleakala	Pan-STARRS 1	T_{j} (2.97) · 3:2	4.4 km	MPC · JPL
540075	2017 OD_{21}	—	November 28, 2013	Mount Lemmon	Mount Lemmon Survey	·	1.5 km	MPC · JPL
540076	2017 OB_{22}	—	October 30, 2005	Mount Lemmon	Mount Lemmon Survey	·	1.5 km	MPC · JPL
540077	2017 OS_{22}	—	February 3, 2009	Kitt Peak	Spacewatch	VER	2.6 km	MPC · JPL
540078	2017 OM_{24}	—	January 3, 2014	Mount Lemmon	Mount Lemmon Survey	·	3.4 km	MPC · JPL
540079	2017 OQ_{28}	—	July 22, 2010	WISE	WISE	·	4.7 km	MPC · JPL
540080	2017 OO_{29}	—	April 14, 2004	Kitt Peak	Spacewatch	ELF	4.1 km	MPC · JPL
540081	2017 OR_{30}	—	May 30, 2006	Kitt Peak	Spacewatch	·	2.2 km	MPC · JPL
540082	2017 OU_{31}	—	October 27, 2005	Mount Lemmon	Mount Lemmon Survey	CYB	3.6 km	MPC · JPL
540083	2017 OJ_{32}	—	January 23, 2015	Haleakala	Pan-STARRS 1	EOS	1.8 km	MPC · JPL
540084	2017 OR_{33}	—	October 7, 2008	Catalina	CSS	·	2.1 km	MPC · JPL
540085	2017 OJ_{34}	—	August 29, 2006	Kitt Peak	Spacewatch	·	2.4 km	MPC · JPL
540086	2017 OX_{34}	—	September 15, 2006	Kitt Peak	Spacewatch	LIX	3.2 km	MPC · JPL
540087	2017 OE_{38}	—	August 27, 2009	Kitt Peak	Spacewatch	H	480 m	MPC · JPL
540088	2017 OH_{40}	—	December 29, 2008	Kitt Peak	Spacewatch	·	750 m	MPC · JPL
540089	2017 OJ_{40}	—	January 16, 2015	Haleakala	Pan-STARRS 1	·	1.4 km	MPC · JPL
540090	2017 OK_{40}	—	January 23, 2015	Haleakala	Pan-STARRS 1	·	2.8 km	MPC · JPL
540091	2017 OZ_{40}	—	April 22, 2012	Kitt Peak	Spacewatch	·	1.4 km	MPC · JPL
540092	2017 OC_{42}	—	November 6, 2013	Mount Lemmon	Mount Lemmon Survey	·	1.2 km	MPC · JPL
540093	2017 OR_{42}	—	September 27, 2006	Kitt Peak	Spacewatch	·	2.9 km	MPC · JPL
540094	2017 OL_{44}	—	October 11, 2002	Kitt Peak	Spacewatch	EOS	1.8 km	MPC · JPL
540095	2017 OK_{45}	—	March 13, 2016	Haleakala	Pan-STARRS 1	·	690 m	MPC · JPL
540096	2017 OD_{46}	—	October 19, 2006	Kitt Peak	Spacewatch	·	3.2 km	MPC · JPL
540097	2017 OK_{46}	—	October 23, 2004	Kitt Peak	Spacewatch	·	630 m	MPC · JPL
540098	2017 OV_{46}	—	September 17, 2006	Catalina	CSS	V	680 m	MPC · JPL
540099	2017 OJ_{48}	—	September 21, 2012	Mount Lemmon	Mount Lemmon Survey	EOS	2.1 km	MPC · JPL
540100	2017 OP_{52}	—	December 21, 2008	Mount Lemmon	Mount Lemmon Survey	·	2.7 km	MPC · JPL

== 540101–540200 ==
back to top

Designation			Discovery			Properties		Ref
Permanent	Provisional	Named after	Date	Site	Discoverer(s)	Category	Diam.	Ref
540101	2017 OS_{52}	—	January 25, 2015	Haleakala	Pan-STARRS 1	EOS	1.5 km	MPC · JPL
540102	2017 OT_{52}	—	January 2, 2009	Kitt Peak	Spacewatch	·	3.4 km	MPC · JPL
540103	2017 OV_{52}	—	December 8, 2010	Mount Lemmon	Mount Lemmon Survey	·	2.2 km	MPC · JPL
540104	2017 OX_{52}	—	October 10, 2008	Kitt Peak	Spacewatch	KOR	1.2 km	MPC · JPL
540105	2017 OO_{55}	—	November 19, 2003	Kitt Peak	Spacewatch	KOR	1.5 km	MPC · JPL
540106	2017 OA_{56}	—	August 15, 2010	La Sagra	OAM	·	630 m	MPC · JPL
540107	2017 OH_{58}	—	September 9, 2007	Kitt Peak	Spacewatch	EOS	1.9 km	MPC · JPL
540108	2017 OF_{59}	—	February 4, 2009	Mount Lemmon	Mount Lemmon Survey	·	2.0 km	MPC · JPL
540109	2017 OO_{59}	—	July 14, 2013	Haleakala	Pan-STARRS 1	·	1.1 km	MPC · JPL
540110	2017 OV_{59}	—	September 7, 2004	Kitt Peak	Spacewatch	·	1.3 km	MPC · JPL
540111	2017 OK_{60}	—	January 31, 2006	Mount Lemmon	Mount Lemmon Survey	·	660 m	MPC · JPL
540112	2017 OT_{60}	—	February 8, 2015	Mount Lemmon	Mount Lemmon Survey	·	920 m	MPC · JPL
540113	2017 OE_{62}	—	February 16, 2015	Haleakala	Pan-STARRS 1	·	1.3 km	MPC · JPL
540114	2017 OQ_{62}	—	March 14, 2012	Kitt Peak	Spacewatch	·	980 m	MPC · JPL
540115	2017 OX_{62}	—	March 18, 2010	Mount Lemmon	Mount Lemmon Survey	·	2.1 km	MPC · JPL
540116	2017 OZ_{62}	—	January 15, 2015	Haleakala	Pan-STARRS 1	HNS	930 m	MPC · JPL
540117	2017 OK_{63}	—	July 14, 2013	Haleakala	Pan-STARRS 1	·	980 m	MPC · JPL
540118	2017 OR_{63}	—	October 30, 2005	Mount Lemmon	Mount Lemmon Survey	·	1.5 km	MPC · JPL
540119	2017 OJ_{64}	—	January 1, 2014	Kitt Peak	Spacewatch	·	2.7 km	MPC · JPL
540120	2017 OU_{64}	—	January 11, 2008	Kitt Peak	Spacewatch	·	840 m	MPC · JPL
540121	2017 OF_{66}	—	May 26, 2006	Kitt Peak	Spacewatch	·	1.7 km	MPC · JPL
540122	2017 OY_{66}	—	February 18, 2015	Haleakala	Pan-STARRS 1	·	1.1 km	MPC · JPL
540123	2017 PP_{2}	—	February 16, 2015	Haleakala	Pan-STARRS 1	EOS	1.5 km	MPC · JPL
540124	2017 PH_{3}	—	April 15, 2012	Haleakala	Pan-STARRS 1	·	1.2 km	MPC · JPL
540125	2017 PR_{10}	—	January 6, 2012	Kitt Peak	Spacewatch	·	660 m	MPC · JPL
540126	2017 PF_{15}	—	January 11, 2008	Mount Lemmon	Mount Lemmon Survey	·	990 m	MPC · JPL
540127	2017 PH_{16}	—	January 21, 2006	Kitt Peak	Spacewatch	·	1.4 km	MPC · JPL
540128	2017 PZ_{16}	—	February 19, 2009	Kitt Peak	Spacewatch	·	2.5 km	MPC · JPL
540129	2017 PZ_{24}	—	November 20, 2000	Socorro	LINEAR	T_{j} (2.96)	5.9 km	MPC · JPL
540130	2017 PV_{27}	—	September 30, 2014	Mount Lemmon	Mount Lemmon Survey	·	540 m	MPC · JPL
540131	2017 PA_{29}	—	December 6, 2011	Haleakala	Pan-STARRS 1	·	630 m	MPC · JPL
540132	2017 PC_{29}	—	December 8, 2010	Mount Lemmon	Mount Lemmon Survey	·	1.1 km	MPC · JPL
540133	2017 PL_{30}	—	November 6, 2008	Kitt Peak	Spacewatch	EOS	1.8 km	MPC · JPL
540134	2017 PA_{31}	—	October 4, 2004	Kitt Peak	Spacewatch	·	640 m	MPC · JPL
540135	2017 PG_{31}	—	October 1, 2005	Anderson Mesa	LONEOS	·	1.1 km	MPC · JPL
540136	2017 PJ_{31}	—	January 31, 2006	Kitt Peak	Spacewatch	·	1.9 km	MPC · JPL
540137	2017 PL_{31}	—	November 20, 2008	Mount Lemmon	Mount Lemmon Survey	·	730 m	MPC · JPL
540138	2017 PP_{31}	—	November 8, 2008	Mount Lemmon	Mount Lemmon Survey	·	2.9 km	MPC · JPL
540139	2017 PZ_{31}	—	March 12, 2007	Kitt Peak	Spacewatch	·	1.6 km	MPC · JPL
540140	2017 PP_{33}	—	November 8, 2009	Mount Lemmon	Mount Lemmon Survey	·	1.6 km	MPC · JPL
540141	2017 PU_{37}	—	October 26, 2009	Mount Lemmon	Mount Lemmon Survey	·	3.6 km	MPC · JPL
540142	2017 PL_{38}	—	January 27, 2003	Socorro	LINEAR	·	3.2 km	MPC · JPL
540143	2017 PJ_{41}	—	November 11, 2004	Kitt Peak	Spacewatch	·	2.6 km	MPC · JPL
540144	2017 QL_{1}	—	August 11, 2012	Siding Spring	SSS	H	530 m	MPC · JPL
540145	2017 QG_{4}	—	October 11, 2010	Mount Lemmon	Mount Lemmon Survey	·	1.2 km	MPC · JPL
540146	2017 QG_{5}	—	September 2, 2008	Kitt Peak	Spacewatch	AGN	1.1 km	MPC · JPL
540147	2017 QL_{6}	—	October 8, 1999	Kitt Peak	Spacewatch	HOF	2.6 km	MPC · JPL
540148	2017 QV_{6}	—	September 9, 2008	Mount Lemmon	Mount Lemmon Survey	·	1.7 km	MPC · JPL
540149	2017 QK_{7}	—	December 30, 2008	Mount Lemmon	Mount Lemmon Survey	·	490 m	MPC · JPL
540150	2017 QP_{7}	—	December 25, 2005	Mount Lemmon	Mount Lemmon Survey	·	680 m	MPC · JPL
540151	2017 QU_{7}	—	January 4, 2011	Mount Lemmon	Mount Lemmon Survey	EUN	1.2 km	MPC · JPL
540152	2017 QO_{8}	—	March 26, 2006	Mount Lemmon	Mount Lemmon Survey	·	610 m	MPC · JPL
540153	2017 QN_{9}	—	September 11, 2007	Kitt Peak	Spacewatch	·	1.5 km	MPC · JPL
540154	2017 QY_{13}	—	September 7, 1999	Kitt Peak	Spacewatch	MRX	960 m	MPC · JPL
540155	2017 QG_{14}	—	October 22, 2012	Haleakala	Pan-STARRS 1	CYB	2.7 km	MPC · JPL
540156	2017 QB_{15}	—	December 2, 2005	Mauna Kea	A. Boattini	·	1.9 km	MPC · JPL
540157	2017 QO_{18}	—	February 1, 2009	Mount Lemmon	Mount Lemmon Survey	·	840 m	MPC · JPL
540158	2017 QR_{18}	—	October 12, 2007	Kitt Peak	Spacewatch	·	2.2 km	MPC · JPL
540159	2017 QZ_{18}	—	August 28, 2006	Kitt Peak	Spacewatch	·	3.2 km	MPC · JPL
540160	2017 QV_{19}	—	September 21, 2008	Kitt Peak	Spacewatch	·	2.0 km	MPC · JPL
540161	2017 QD_{23}	—	December 12, 2004	Kitt Peak	Spacewatch	·	630 m	MPC · JPL
540162	2017 QE_{23}	—	February 23, 2007	Mount Lemmon	Mount Lemmon Survey	·	1.1 km	MPC · JPL
540163	2017 QG_{24}	—	September 15, 2004	Socorro	LINEAR	·	1.4 km	MPC · JPL
540164	2017 QK_{24}	—	November 26, 2009	Mount Lemmon	Mount Lemmon Survey	·	1.1 km	MPC · JPL
540165	2017 QL_{24}	—	August 27, 2006	Kitt Peak	Spacewatch	·	1.2 km	MPC · JPL
540166	2017 QH_{27}	—	January 3, 2009	Kitt Peak	Spacewatch	·	2.3 km	MPC · JPL
540167	2017 QL_{28}	—	December 27, 2006	Mount Lemmon	Mount Lemmon Survey	·	910 m	MPC · JPL
540168	2017 QD_{30}	—	December 4, 2008	Mount Lemmon	Mount Lemmon Survey	·	1.8 km	MPC · JPL
540169	2017 QG_{30}	—	November 27, 2014	Haleakala	Pan-STARRS 1	·	1.4 km	MPC · JPL
540170	2017 QM_{30}	—	October 13, 2010	Mount Lemmon	Mount Lemmon Survey	·	1.2 km	MPC · JPL
540171	2017 QR_{30}	—	September 17, 2009	Kitt Peak	Spacewatch	·	1.4 km	MPC · JPL
540172	2017 QG_{32}	—	October 23, 2012	Mount Lemmon	Mount Lemmon Survey	EOS	2.1 km	MPC · JPL
540173	2017 QJ_{35}	—	June 30, 2008	Kitt Peak	Spacewatch	·	1.4 km	MPC · JPL
540174	2017 QT_{38}	—	May 8, 2005	Kitt Peak	Spacewatch	·	1.1 km	MPC · JPL
540175	2017 QO_{39}	—	January 11, 2010	Kitt Peak	Spacewatch	·	1.6 km	MPC · JPL
540176	2017 QF_{40}	—	December 3, 2008	Kitt Peak	Spacewatch	EOS	2.0 km	MPC · JPL
540177	2017 QG_{40}	—	January 16, 2005	Kitt Peak	Spacewatch	·	1.8 km	MPC · JPL
540178	2017 QB_{41}	—	January 1, 2009	Kitt Peak	Spacewatch	·	860 m	MPC · JPL
540179	2017 QC_{42}	—	March 12, 2005	Kitt Peak	Spacewatch	·	2.1 km	MPC · JPL
540180	2017 QA_{51}	—	May 13, 2004	Kitt Peak	Spacewatch	·	1.3 km	MPC · JPL
540181	2017 QF_{51}	—	September 15, 2013	Haleakala	Pan-STARRS 1	·	1.4 km	MPC · JPL
540182	2017 QC_{52}	—	November 20, 2004	Kitt Peak	Spacewatch	AST	1.9 km	MPC · JPL
540183	2017 QX_{52}	—	January 31, 2006	Kitt Peak	Spacewatch	·	1.4 km	MPC · JPL
540184	2017 QH_{54}	—	October 12, 1998	Kitt Peak	Spacewatch	·	1.6 km	MPC · JPL
540185	2017 QO_{54}	—	February 20, 2002	Kitt Peak	Spacewatch	H	420 m	MPC · JPL
540186	2017 QY_{54}	—	January 8, 2010	Kitt Peak	Spacewatch	·	2.1 km	MPC · JPL
540187	2017 QH_{55}	—	October 13, 2002	Palomar	NEAT	PHO	1.5 km	MPC · JPL
540188	2017 QS_{55}	—	February 25, 2006	Kitt Peak	Spacewatch	HOF	2.8 km	MPC · JPL
540189	2017 QR_{57}	—	January 31, 2009	Mount Lemmon	Mount Lemmon Survey	·	3.6 km	MPC · JPL
540190	2017 QW_{57}	—	March 1, 2011	Mount Lemmon	Mount Lemmon Survey	·	1.2 km	MPC · JPL
540191	2017 QX_{57}	—	February 10, 2007	Mount Lemmon	Mount Lemmon Survey	·	2.1 km	MPC · JPL
540192	2017 QX_{58}	—	October 1, 2013	Kitt Peak	Spacewatch	·	1.6 km	MPC · JPL
540193	2017 QT_{60}	—	November 15, 1995	Kitt Peak	Spacewatch	·	1.7 km	MPC · JPL
540194	2017 QU_{60}	—	September 19, 2003	Kitt Peak	Spacewatch	·	950 m	MPC · JPL
540195	2017 QZ_{63}	—	June 27, 2010	WISE	WISE	·	3.0 km	MPC · JPL
540196	2017 QM_{64}	—	July 21, 2010	WISE	WISE	·	2.8 km	MPC · JPL
540197	2017 QF_{65}	—	January 19, 2004	Kitt Peak	Spacewatch	EOS	1.9 km	MPC · JPL
540198	2017 QC_{67}	—	February 15, 2012	Haleakala	Pan-STARRS 1	PHO	780 m	MPC · JPL
540199	2017 QQ_{67}	—	January 6, 2010	Kitt Peak	Spacewatch	·	2.0 km	MPC · JPL
540200	2017 RC_{4}	—	December 3, 2007	Kitt Peak	Spacewatch	·	2.9 km	MPC · JPL

== 540201–540300 ==
back to top

Designation			Discovery			Properties		Ref
Permanent	Provisional	Named after	Date	Site	Discoverer(s)	Category	Diam.	Ref
540201	2017 RW_{9}	—	August 10, 2007	Kitt Peak	Spacewatch	·	2.3 km	MPC · JPL
540202	2017 RM_{11}	—	September 24, 2008	Kitt Peak	Spacewatch	HOF	2.1 km	MPC · JPL
540203	2017 RN_{13}	—	June 18, 2013	Haleakala	Pan-STARRS 1	V	450 m	MPC · JPL
540204	2017 RD_{17}	—	October 24, 2011	Haleakala	Pan-STARRS 1	·	490 m	MPC · JPL
540205	2017 RS_{17}	—	August 9, 2016	Haleakala	Pan-STARRS 1	T_{j} (2.27) · unusual	7.0 km	MPC · JPL
540206	2017 RM_{18}	—	March 11, 2008	Mount Lemmon	Mount Lemmon Survey	·	2.1 km	MPC · JPL
540207	2017 RP_{18}	—	September 10, 2013	Haleakala	Pan-STARRS 1	·	1.2 km	MPC · JPL
540208	2017 RW_{18}	—	May 16, 2010	WISE	WISE	·	1.7 km	MPC · JPL
540209	2017 RZ_{18}	—	November 11, 2013	Mount Lemmon	Mount Lemmon Survey	·	1.6 km	MPC · JPL
540210	2017 RJ_{19}	—	October 3, 2013	Catalina	CSS	·	1.2 km	MPC · JPL
540211	2017 RL_{20}	—	December 18, 2003	Kitt Peak	Spacewatch	EOS	2.1 km	MPC · JPL
540212	2017 RT_{20}	—	November 17, 2007	Mount Lemmon	Mount Lemmon Survey	·	680 m	MPC · JPL
540213	2017 RU_{20}	—	July 24, 2000	Kitt Peak	Spacewatch	·	930 m	MPC · JPL
540214	2017 RX_{20}	—	October 21, 2006	Kitt Peak	Spacewatch	·	1.2 km	MPC · JPL
540215	2017 RY_{20}	—	January 8, 2002	Socorro	LINEAR	(883)	670 m	MPC · JPL
540216	2017 RA_{21}	—	February 3, 2009	Kitt Peak	Spacewatch	·	720 m	MPC · JPL
540217	2017 RE_{21}	—	January 27, 2006	Mount Lemmon	Mount Lemmon Survey	·	1.5 km	MPC · JPL
540218	2017 RJ_{21}	—	July 16, 2013	Haleakala	Pan-STARRS 1	·	1.6 km	MPC · JPL
540219	2017 RN_{21}	—	November 10, 2009	Kitt Peak	Spacewatch	·	1.2 km	MPC · JPL
540220	2017 RP_{21}	—	November 9, 2007	Kitt Peak	Spacewatch	EOS	1.9 km	MPC · JPL
540221	2017 RS_{21}	—	October 31, 2006	Mount Lemmon	Mount Lemmon Survey	·	990 m	MPC · JPL
540222	2017 RT_{21}	—	September 14, 2007	Mount Lemmon	Mount Lemmon Survey	·	2.0 km	MPC · JPL
540223	2017 RW_{21}	—	March 16, 2004	Kitt Peak	Spacewatch	·	1.1 km	MPC · JPL
540224	2017 RX_{21}	—	August 26, 2012	Haleakala	Pan-STARRS 1	EOS	2.0 km	MPC · JPL
540225	2017 RE_{22}	—	February 3, 2009	Kitt Peak	Spacewatch	·	3.2 km	MPC · JPL
540226	2017 RQ_{22}	—	September 9, 2004	Kitt Peak	Spacewatch	·	1.4 km	MPC · JPL
540227	2017 RW_{22}	—	August 12, 2010	Kitt Peak	Spacewatch	·	740 m	MPC · JPL
540228	2017 RX_{22}	—	January 3, 2011	Mount Lemmon	Mount Lemmon Survey	·	1.1 km	MPC · JPL
540229	2017 RN_{23}	—	October 9, 2008	Mount Lemmon	Mount Lemmon Survey	·	1.7 km	MPC · JPL
540230	2017 RR_{23}	—	July 10, 2005	Siding Spring	SSS	LUT	6.0 km	MPC · JPL
540231	2017 RS_{23}	—	September 4, 2008	Kitt Peak	Spacewatch	PAD	1.5 km	MPC · JPL
540232	2017 RT_{23}	—	January 18, 2008	Kitt Peak	Spacewatch	V	590 m	MPC · JPL
540233	2017 RW_{23}	—	April 30, 2012	Mount Lemmon	Mount Lemmon Survey	PHO	960 m	MPC · JPL
540234	2017 RQ_{24}	—	October 6, 2008	Mount Lemmon	Mount Lemmon Survey	·	1.7 km	MPC · JPL
540235	2017 RU_{24}	—	October 1, 2008	Mount Lemmon	Mount Lemmon Survey	·	1.8 km	MPC · JPL
540236	2017 RV_{24}	—	October 30, 2005	Kitt Peak	Spacewatch	·	1.3 km	MPC · JPL
540237	2017 RV_{25}	—	November 7, 2005	Mauna Kea	A. Boattini	·	1.7 km	MPC · JPL
540238	2017 RD_{26}	—	February 12, 2008	Mount Lemmon	Mount Lemmon Survey	·	990 m	MPC · JPL
540239	2017 RM_{26}	—	April 12, 2011	Mount Lemmon	Mount Lemmon Survey	·	2.2 km	MPC · JPL
540240	2017 RF_{27}	—	February 2, 2006	Kitt Peak	Spacewatch	·	1.9 km	MPC · JPL
540241	2017 RL_{27}	—	January 20, 2012	Mount Lemmon	Mount Lemmon Survey	(2076)	770 m	MPC · JPL
540242	2017 RG_{28}	—	December 1, 2004	Catalina	CSS	JUN	1.0 km	MPC · JPL
540243	2017 RL_{28}	—	March 24, 2006	Kitt Peak	Spacewatch	·	2.7 km	MPC · JPL
540244	2017 RP_{28}	—	November 27, 2013	Haleakala	Pan-STARRS 1	·	1.8 km	MPC · JPL
540245	2017 RS_{28}	—	September 17, 2003	Kitt Peak	Spacewatch	·	2.0 km	MPC · JPL
540246	2017 RX_{28}	—	August 28, 2006	Kitt Peak	Spacewatch	·	1.9 km	MPC · JPL
540247	2017 RY_{28}	—	August 19, 2006	Kitt Peak	Spacewatch	·	3.7 km	MPC · JPL
540248	2017 RA_{29}	—	February 7, 2006	Kitt Peak	Spacewatch	AGN	1.2 km	MPC · JPL
540249	2017 RE_{29}	—	March 30, 2011	Mount Lemmon	Mount Lemmon Survey	·	1.3 km	MPC · JPL
540250	2017 RG_{30}	—	January 23, 2006	Kitt Peak	Spacewatch	·	1.7 km	MPC · JPL
540251	2017 RU_{30}	—	September 20, 1995	Kitt Peak	Spacewatch	VER	2.3 km	MPC · JPL
540252	2017 RM_{31}	—	October 30, 1999	Kitt Peak	Spacewatch	MAS	690 m	MPC · JPL
540253	2017 RC_{32}	—	August 19, 2006	Kitt Peak	Spacewatch	(31811)	3.3 km	MPC · JPL
540254	2017 RH_{32}	—	March 29, 2011	Mount Lemmon	Mount Lemmon Survey	·	1.5 km	MPC · JPL
540255	2017 RL_{32}	—	July 28, 2009	Kitt Peak	Spacewatch	3:2	4.9 km	MPC · JPL
540256	2017 RZ_{32}	—	October 1, 2013	Kitt Peak	Spacewatch	·	1.2 km	MPC · JPL
540257	2017 RO_{35}	—	October 21, 2001	Kitt Peak	Spacewatch	·	2.1 km	MPC · JPL
540258	2017 RT_{37}	—	February 14, 2005	Kitt Peak	Spacewatch	·	1.4 km	MPC · JPL
540259	2017 RN_{38}	—	November 14, 2007	Kitt Peak	Spacewatch	·	1.0 km	MPC · JPL
540260	2017 RD_{39}	—	September 11, 2004	Kitt Peak	Spacewatch	·	1.3 km	MPC · JPL
540261	2017 RL_{41}	—	October 17, 2012	Haleakala	Pan-STARRS 1	EOS	1.4 km	MPC · JPL
540262	2017 RH_{42}	—	October 14, 2004	Kitt Peak	Spacewatch	·	1.4 km	MPC · JPL
540263	2017 RB_{43}	—	January 16, 2009	Kitt Peak	Spacewatch	·	1.3 km	MPC · JPL
540264	2017 RO_{43}	—	January 26, 2009	Mount Lemmon	Mount Lemmon Survey	·	660 m	MPC · JPL
540265	2017 RO_{47}	—	February 19, 2009	Mount Lemmon	Mount Lemmon Survey	·	3.0 km	MPC · JPL
540266	2017 RJ_{49}	—	October 7, 2004	Kitt Peak	Spacewatch	·	1.4 km	MPC · JPL
540267	2017 RM_{49}	—	August 21, 2008	Kitt Peak	Spacewatch	·	1.7 km	MPC · JPL
540268	2017 RU_{49}	—	October 19, 1995	Kitt Peak	Spacewatch	·	1.2 km	MPC · JPL
540269	2017 RS_{51}	—	December 1, 2003	Kitt Peak	Spacewatch	·	2.0 km	MPC · JPL
540270	2017 RR_{52}	—	October 8, 2004	Kitt Peak	Spacewatch	·	1.6 km	MPC · JPL
540271	2017 RE_{54}	—	October 23, 2006	Kitt Peak	Spacewatch	·	810 m	MPC · JPL
540272	2017 RF_{54}	—	November 4, 2004	Kitt Peak	Spacewatch	·	1.3 km	MPC · JPL
540273	2017 RM_{55}	—	February 27, 2009	Kitt Peak	Spacewatch	·	2.8 km	MPC · JPL
540274	2017 RA_{56}	—	April 24, 2004	Kitt Peak	Spacewatch	THM	2.0 km	MPC · JPL
540275	2017 RD_{57}	—	October 3, 2008	Mount Lemmon	Mount Lemmon Survey	AGN	920 m	MPC · JPL
540276	2017 RK_{57}	—	November 2, 2013	Kitt Peak	Spacewatch	·	1.4 km	MPC · JPL
540277	2017 RR_{57}	—	September 27, 2008	Mount Lemmon	Mount Lemmon Survey	·	1.8 km	MPC · JPL
540278	2017 RW_{57}	—	October 9, 2008	Mount Lemmon	Mount Lemmon Survey	·	1.2 km	MPC · JPL
540279	2017 RS_{60}	—	October 31, 2008	Kitt Peak	Spacewatch	KOR	1.2 km	MPC · JPL
540280	2017 RG_{61}	—	January 19, 2005	Kitt Peak	Spacewatch	·	2.4 km	MPC · JPL
540281	2017 RN_{61}	—	October 8, 2004	Kitt Peak	Spacewatch	·	1.6 km	MPC · JPL
540282	2017 RY_{61}	—	November 11, 2004	Kitt Peak	Spacewatch	NEM	2.2 km	MPC · JPL
540283	2017 RU_{64}	—	September 28, 2006	Kitt Peak	Spacewatch	·	3.3 km	MPC · JPL
540284	2017 RO_{65}	—	April 13, 2013	Kitt Peak	Spacewatch	·	550 m	MPC · JPL
540285	2017 RA_{66}	—	September 28, 2003	Kitt Peak	Spacewatch	·	2.1 km	MPC · JPL
540286	2017 RA_{67}	—	March 24, 2009	Mount Lemmon	Mount Lemmon Survey	·	460 m	MPC · JPL
540287	2017 RV_{67}	—	February 24, 2009	Catalina	CSS	·	680 m	MPC · JPL
540288	2017 RQ_{69}	—	November 24, 2002	Palomar	NEAT	NYS	1.5 km	MPC · JPL
540289	2017 RH_{70}	—	September 23, 2008	Mount Lemmon	Mount Lemmon Survey	·	2.6 km	MPC · JPL
540290	2017 RT_{70}	—	December 4, 2007	Kitt Peak	Spacewatch	·	580 m	MPC · JPL
540291	2017 RC_{71}	—	February 10, 2008	Mount Lemmon	Mount Lemmon Survey	·	1.1 km	MPC · JPL
540292	2017 RK_{71}	—	November 9, 2007	Mount Lemmon	Mount Lemmon Survey	·	940 m	MPC · JPL
540293	2017 RA_{72}	—	March 11, 2010	WISE	WISE	·	2.2 km	MPC · JPL
540294	2017 RM_{72}	—	October 7, 2004	Anderson Mesa	LONEOS	·	1.6 km	MPC · JPL
540295	2017 RQ_{72}	—	October 26, 2005	Kitt Peak	Spacewatch	·	750 m	MPC · JPL
540296	2017 RF_{73}	—	November 19, 2009	Kitt Peak	Spacewatch	·	1.5 km	MPC · JPL
540297	2017 RK_{74}	—	November 3, 2007	Kitt Peak	Spacewatch	·	1.5 km	MPC · JPL
540298	2017 RR_{74}	—	September 28, 2013	Catalina	CSS	·	1.5 km	MPC · JPL
540299	2017 RT_{74}	—	August 31, 2003	Haleakala	NEAT	DOR	2.7 km	MPC · JPL
540300	2017 RK_{75}	—	January 31, 2009	Mount Lemmon	Mount Lemmon Survey	·	4.7 km	MPC · JPL

== 540301–540400 ==
back to top

Designation			Discovery			Properties		Ref
Permanent	Provisional	Named after	Date	Site	Discoverer(s)	Category	Diam.	Ref
540301	2017 RL_{75}	—	February 18, 2008	Mount Lemmon	Mount Lemmon Survey	PHO	1.3 km	MPC · JPL
540302	2017 RX_{75}	—	December 21, 2008	Mount Lemmon	Mount Lemmon Survey	·	1.6 km	MPC · JPL
540303	2017 RH_{77}	—	January 31, 2009	Mount Lemmon	Mount Lemmon Survey	·	2.5 km	MPC · JPL
540304	2017 RM_{77}	—	February 7, 2002	Kitt Peak	Spacewatch	·	1.7 km	MPC · JPL
540305	2017 RJ_{78}	—	April 27, 2012	Haleakala	Pan-STARRS 1	·	990 m	MPC · JPL
540306	2017 RU_{79}	—	January 7, 2006	Kitt Peak	Spacewatch	·	1.7 km	MPC · JPL
540307	2017 RR_{81}	—	July 21, 2006	Mount Lemmon	Mount Lemmon Survey	·	2.3 km	MPC · JPL
540308	2017 RZ_{81}	—	December 3, 2005	Mauna Kea	A. Boattini	·	660 m	MPC · JPL
540309	2017 RL_{82}	—	October 30, 2008	Kitt Peak	Spacewatch	KOR	1.7 km	MPC · JPL
540310	2017 RS_{82}	—	January 10, 2008	Mount Lemmon	Mount Lemmon Survey	V	620 m	MPC · JPL
540311	2017 RA_{83}	—	September 19, 2006	Catalina	CSS	·	1.3 km	MPC · JPL
540312	2017 RE_{83}	—	April 30, 2009	Catalina	CSS	·	950 m	MPC · JPL
540313	2017 RH_{83}	—	February 11, 2004	Kitt Peak	Spacewatch	·	1.1 km	MPC · JPL
540314	2017 RV_{83}	—	October 9, 2010	Mount Lemmon	Mount Lemmon Survey	·	630 m	MPC · JPL
540315	2017 RH_{84}	—	January 17, 2015	Haleakala	Pan-STARRS 1	·	1.5 km	MPC · JPL
540316	2017 RP_{85}	—	December 22, 2008	Mount Lemmon	Mount Lemmon Survey	·	2.6 km	MPC · JPL
540317	2017 RY_{85}	—	September 3, 2008	Kitt Peak	Spacewatch	·	1.7 km	MPC · JPL
540318	2017 RG_{88}	—	September 10, 2004	Kitt Peak	Spacewatch	·	1.6 km	MPC · JPL
540319	2017 RH_{88}	—	September 25, 2006	Kitt Peak	Spacewatch	·	1.3 km	MPC · JPL
540320	2017 RF_{90}	—	September 19, 2006	Kitt Peak	Spacewatch	MAS	540 m	MPC · JPL
540321	2017 RL_{90}	—	November 26, 2003	Kitt Peak	Spacewatch	·	1.9 km	MPC · JPL
540322	2017 RC_{91}	—	October 29, 2008	Mount Lemmon	Mount Lemmon Survey	·	1.5 km	MPC · JPL
540323	2017 RJ_{91}	—	October 27, 2005	Kitt Peak	Spacewatch	·	2.1 km	MPC · JPL
540324	2017 RB_{92}	—	January 27, 2007	Mount Lemmon	Mount Lemmon Survey	·	1.1 km	MPC · JPL
540325	2017 RQ_{93}	—	February 9, 2005	Mount Lemmon	Mount Lemmon Survey	KOR	1.4 km	MPC · JPL
540326	2017 RV_{95}	—	September 24, 2008	Kitt Peak	Spacewatch	·	2.4 km	MPC · JPL
540327	2017 RZ_{95}	—	February 1, 2009	Mount Lemmon	Mount Lemmon Survey	·	2.5 km	MPC · JPL
540328	2017 RZ_{96}	—	October 22, 2005	Kitt Peak	Spacewatch	·	870 m	MPC · JPL
540329	2017 RD_{97}	—	November 23, 2009	Mount Lemmon	Mount Lemmon Survey	(5)	1.2 km	MPC · JPL
540330	2017 RE_{98}	—	September 6, 2008	Mount Lemmon	Mount Lemmon Survey	·	1.6 km	MPC · JPL
540331	2017 RH_{98}	—	January 19, 2005	Kitt Peak	Spacewatch	·	670 m	MPC · JPL
540332	2017 RR_{98}	—	June 17, 2005	Mount Lemmon	Mount Lemmon Survey	THM	2.5 km	MPC · JPL
540333	2017 RW_{98}	—	March 25, 2007	Mount Lemmon	Mount Lemmon Survey	·	1.4 km	MPC · JPL
540334	2017 RB_{99}	—	April 12, 2004	Kitt Peak	Spacewatch	·	1.2 km	MPC · JPL
540335	2017 RT_{100}	—	November 14, 2006	Kitt Peak	Spacewatch	NYS	1.2 km	MPC · JPL
540336	2017 RM_{103}	—	November 25, 2005	Mount Lemmon	Mount Lemmon Survey	·	1.5 km	MPC · JPL
540337	2017 RO_{103}	—	November 20, 2009	Kitt Peak	Spacewatch	·	1.4 km	MPC · JPL
540338	2017 RY_{104}	—	November 4, 2007	Kitt Peak	Spacewatch	·	2.1 km	MPC · JPL
540339	2017 RO_{105}	—	October 24, 2009	Kitt Peak	Spacewatch	EUN	870 m	MPC · JPL
540340	2017 RQ_{106}	—	December 18, 2007	Mount Lemmon	Mount Lemmon Survey	·	2.7 km	MPC · JPL
540341	2017 RA_{107}	—	October 17, 2006	Kitt Peak	Spacewatch	·	3.4 km	MPC · JPL
540342	2017 RJ_{109}	—	August 13, 2012	Kitt Peak	Spacewatch	EOS	1.8 km	MPC · JPL
540343	2017 RT_{109}	—	September 12, 2007	Mount Lemmon	Mount Lemmon Survey	·	1.6 km	MPC · JPL
540344	2017 RD_{110}	—	February 22, 2007	Kitt Peak	Spacewatch	·	910 m	MPC · JPL
540345	2017 SU	—	October 28, 2013	Mount Lemmon	Mount Lemmon Survey	MAR	970 m	MPC · JPL
540346	2017 SX	—	October 25, 2013	Kitt Peak	Spacewatch	·	1.1 km	MPC · JPL
540347	2017 SC_{2}	—	October 6, 1999	Socorro	LINEAR	H	540 m	MPC · JPL
540348	2017 SE_{3}	—	February 26, 2008	Mount Lemmon	Mount Lemmon Survey	·	2.0 km	MPC · JPL
540349	2017 SQ_{4}	—	November 1, 2007	Kitt Peak	Spacewatch	EOS	1.5 km	MPC · JPL
540350	2017 SM_{9}	—	October 20, 2004	Catalina	CSS	EUN	1.3 km	MPC · JPL
540351	2017 SO_{9}	—	January 30, 2011	Mount Lemmon	Mount Lemmon Survey	·	1.4 km	MPC · JPL
540352	2017 SB_{11}	—	April 26, 2011	Kitt Peak	Spacewatch	H	530 m	MPC · JPL
540353	2017 SC_{13}	—	June 16, 2009	Mount Lemmon	Mount Lemmon Survey	H	690 m	MPC · JPL
540354	2017 SX_{14}	—	March 29, 2011	Mount Lemmon	Mount Lemmon Survey	H	370 m	MPC · JPL
540355	2017 SA_{22}	—	September 5, 2008	Kitt Peak	Spacewatch	·	2.0 km	MPC · JPL
540356	2017 SB_{22}	—	October 7, 2012	Haleakala	Pan-STARRS 1	EOS	1.7 km	MPC · JPL
540357	2017 SE_{22}	—	October 17, 2003	Anderson Mesa	LONEOS	GEF	1.3 km	MPC · JPL
540358	2017 SJ_{24}	—	September 17, 2010	Mount Lemmon	Mount Lemmon Survey	·	670 m	MPC · JPL
540359	2017 SQ_{25}	—	November 17, 2014	Mount Lemmon	Mount Lemmon Survey	·	610 m	MPC · JPL
540360	2017 SM_{28}	—	December 26, 2014	Haleakala	Pan-STARRS 1	PHO	730 m	MPC · JPL
540361	2017 SQ_{30}	—	December 1, 2014	Haleakala	Pan-STARRS 1	·	1.3 km	MPC · JPL
540362	2017 ST_{30}	—	September 15, 2012	Mount Lemmon	Mount Lemmon Survey	·	1.7 km	MPC · JPL
540363	2017 SU_{30}	—	October 20, 2012	Haleakala	Pan-STARRS 1	·	2.1 km	MPC · JPL
540364	2017 SU_{31}	—	September 3, 2007	Catalina	CSS	KOR	1.5 km	MPC · JPL
540365	2017 SA_{32}	—	October 21, 2012	Haleakala	Pan-STARRS 1	·	1.8 km	MPC · JPL
540366	2017 SB_{32}	—	November 20, 2007	Mount Lemmon	Mount Lemmon Survey	·	790 m	MPC · JPL
540367	2017 SL_{32}	—	November 20, 2008	Kitt Peak	Spacewatch	KOR	1.1 km	MPC · JPL
540368	2017 SV_{35}	—	November 14, 2007	Mount Lemmon	Mount Lemmon Survey	EOS	1.5 km	MPC · JPL
540369	2017 SD_{36}	—	September 14, 2013	Mount Lemmon	Mount Lemmon Survey	MAR	1.1 km	MPC · JPL
540370	2017 SA_{37}	—	January 13, 2015	Haleakala	Pan-STARRS 1	·	1.3 km	MPC · JPL
540371	2017 SD_{37}	—	July 13, 2013	Haleakala	Pan-STARRS 1	EUN	1.1 km	MPC · JPL
540372	2017 SK_{38}	—	January 28, 2009	Kitt Peak	Spacewatch	·	2.1 km	MPC · JPL
540373	2017 SL_{38}	—	February 28, 2009	Mount Lemmon	Mount Lemmon Survey	·	3.0 km	MPC · JPL
540374	2017 SS_{38}	—	October 13, 2013	Catalina	CSS	EUN	1.2 km	MPC · JPL
540375	2017 SV_{38}	—	February 2, 2001	Kitt Peak	Spacewatch	·	680 m	MPC · JPL
540376	2017 SC_{40}	—	October 21, 2007	Mount Lemmon	Mount Lemmon Survey	·	2.0 km	MPC · JPL
540377	2017 SB_{41}	—	January 21, 2015	Haleakala	Pan-STARRS 1	·	1.2 km	MPC · JPL
540378	2017 SR_{41}	—	August 29, 2006	Kitt Peak	Spacewatch	·	1.8 km	MPC · JPL
540379	2017 SK_{42}	—	November 30, 2005	Mount Lemmon	Mount Lemmon Survey	·	1.2 km	MPC · JPL
540380	2017 SG_{43}	—	September 15, 2013	Catalina	CSS	·	1.2 km	MPC · JPL
540381	2017 SJ_{43}	—	October 13, 2007	Catalina	CSS	·	1.9 km	MPC · JPL
540382	2017 SN_{43}	—	October 24, 2009	Kitt Peak	Spacewatch	·	1.4 km	MPC · JPL
540383	2017 SP_{43}	—	March 15, 2009	Kitt Peak	Spacewatch	·	3.9 km	MPC · JPL
540384	2017 SG_{44}	—	November 8, 2008	Mount Lemmon	Mount Lemmon Survey	·	3.1 km	MPC · JPL
540385	2017 SH_{44}	—	December 27, 2003	Kitt Peak	Spacewatch	EOS	2.5 km	MPC · JPL
540386	2017 SP_{45}	—	January 9, 2006	Mount Lemmon	Mount Lemmon Survey	WIT	1.2 km	MPC · JPL
540387	2017 ST_{45}	—	October 4, 2002	Socorro	LINEAR	·	1.2 km	MPC · JPL
540388	2017 SW_{46}	—	September 3, 2008	Kitt Peak	Spacewatch	·	1.9 km	MPC · JPL
540389	2017 SO_{47}	—	January 11, 2010	Kitt Peak	Spacewatch	·	1.8 km	MPC · JPL
540390	2017 SC_{48}	—	September 18, 2009	Kitt Peak	Spacewatch	(5)	870 m	MPC · JPL
540391	2017 SF_{48}	—	January 26, 2006	Kitt Peak	Spacewatch	·	1.6 km	MPC · JPL
540392	2017 SK_{48}	—	March 1, 2008	Kitt Peak	Spacewatch	CYB	3.4 km	MPC · JPL
540393	2017 SL_{48}	—	October 11, 2006	Kitt Peak	Spacewatch	·	1.1 km	MPC · JPL
540394	2017 SX_{48}	—	March 5, 2006	Kitt Peak	Spacewatch	(1547)	1.5 km	MPC · JPL
540395	2017 SG_{49}	—	February 27, 2012	Haleakala	Pan-STARRS 1	·	1.0 km	MPC · JPL
540396	2017 SU_{49}	—	September 23, 2008	Kitt Peak	Spacewatch	HOF	2.0 km	MPC · JPL
540397	2017 ST_{50}	—	September 17, 2009	Kitt Peak	Spacewatch	RAF	730 m	MPC · JPL
540398	2017 SD_{51}	—	October 18, 2012	Mount Lemmon	Mount Lemmon Survey	EOS	1.6 km	MPC · JPL
540399	2017 SF_{51}	—	October 9, 2007	Kitt Peak	Spacewatch	·	2.0 km	MPC · JPL
540400	2017 SR_{52}	—	September 9, 2010	La Sagra	OAM	·	880 m	MPC · JPL

== 540401–540500 ==
back to top

Designation			Discovery			Properties		Ref
Permanent	Provisional	Named after	Date	Site	Discoverer(s)	Category	Diam.	Ref
540401	2017 SB_{53}	—	October 17, 2010	Mount Lemmon	Mount Lemmon Survey	·	990 m	MPC · JPL
540402	2017 SD_{53}	—	August 13, 2010	Kitt Peak	Spacewatch	·	700 m	MPC · JPL
540403	2017 SF_{53}	—	November 19, 2003	Kitt Peak	Spacewatch	·	1.4 km	MPC · JPL
540404	2017 SJ_{53}	—	February 29, 2012	Mount Lemmon	Mount Lemmon Survey	·	660 m	MPC · JPL
540405	2017 SQ_{53}	—	August 17, 2009	Kitt Peak	Spacewatch	·	1.5 km	MPC · JPL
540406	2017 SD_{54}	—	April 1, 2011	Mount Lemmon	Mount Lemmon Survey	·	1.5 km	MPC · JPL
540407	2017 SF_{54}	—	October 19, 2006	Kitt Peak	Spacewatch	·	2.6 km	MPC · JPL
540408	2017 SV_{54}	—	February 18, 2008	Mount Lemmon	Mount Lemmon Survey	H	500 m	MPC · JPL
540409	2017 SE_{55}	—	November 10, 2009	Kitt Peak	Spacewatch	(5)	1.4 km	MPC · JPL
540410	2017 SJ_{55}	—	October 18, 2012	Haleakala	Pan-STARRS 1	·	2.0 km	MPC · JPL
540411	2017 SN_{55}	—	January 13, 2005	Kitt Peak	Spacewatch	DOR	2.1 km	MPC · JPL
540412	2017 ST_{55}	—	November 8, 2009	Mount Lemmon	Mount Lemmon Survey	·	1.1 km	MPC · JPL
540413 Nikzad	2017 SU_{55}	Nikzad	February 2, 2010	WISE	WISE	KON	1.9 km	MPC · JPL
540414	2017 SV_{55}	—	November 12, 2013	Kitt Peak	Spacewatch	·	1.4 km	MPC · JPL
540415	2017 ST_{56}	—	March 3, 2008	Mount Lemmon	Mount Lemmon Survey	V	750 m	MPC · JPL
540416	2017 SX_{57}	—	December 10, 2009	Mount Lemmon	Mount Lemmon Survey	·	1.3 km	MPC · JPL
540417	2017 SM_{58}	—	May 29, 2009	Mount Lemmon	Mount Lemmon Survey	·	1.1 km	MPC · JPL
540418	2017 SR_{58}	—	February 3, 2001	Kitt Peak	Spacewatch	NEM	2.1 km	MPC · JPL
540419	2017 SR_{59}	—	April 23, 2011	Haleakala	Pan-STARRS 1	·	2.1 km	MPC · JPL
540420	2017 SC_{60}	—	January 7, 2006	Mount Lemmon	Mount Lemmon Survey	·	1.3 km	MPC · JPL
540421	2017 SK_{61}	—	October 22, 2014	Kitt Peak	Spacewatch	·	700 m	MPC · JPL
540422	2017 SM_{61}	—	November 6, 2010	Mount Lemmon	Mount Lemmon Survey	·	1.2 km	MPC · JPL
540423	2017 SO_{61}	—	January 30, 2008	Mount Lemmon	Mount Lemmon Survey	VER	2.6 km	MPC · JPL
540424	2017 SX_{61}	—	April 20, 2012	Mount Lemmon	Mount Lemmon Survey	·	1.5 km	MPC · JPL
540425	2017 SZ_{62}	—	October 8, 2004	Kitt Peak	Spacewatch	·	1.7 km	MPC · JPL
540426	2017 SE_{63}	—	September 22, 2003	Kitt Peak	Spacewatch	·	2.0 km	MPC · JPL
540427	2017 SR_{63}	—	February 28, 2009	Mount Lemmon	Mount Lemmon Survey	·	2.1 km	MPC · JPL
540428	2017 SK_{64}	—	March 17, 2004	Kitt Peak	Spacewatch	·	2.5 km	MPC · JPL
540429	2017 SN_{64}	—	October 11, 2007	Kitt Peak	Spacewatch	·	1.7 km	MPC · JPL
540430	2017 SP_{64}	—	January 31, 2006	Kitt Peak	Spacewatch	NEM	1.8 km	MPC · JPL
540431	2017 SZ_{64}	—	November 24, 2008	Kitt Peak	Spacewatch	·	1.3 km	MPC · JPL
540432	2017 SE_{66}	—	October 28, 1997	Kitt Peak	Spacewatch	·	1.0 km	MPC · JPL
540433	2017 SL_{66}	—	January 20, 2002	Kitt Peak	Spacewatch	·	530 m	MPC · JPL
540434	2017 SE_{69}	—	October 24, 2009	Kitt Peak	Spacewatch	·	1.2 km	MPC · JPL
540435	2017 SR_{69}	—	October 19, 2010	Mount Lemmon	Mount Lemmon Survey	3:2	4.4 km	MPC · JPL
540436	2017 SV_{69}	—	February 25, 2006	Kitt Peak	Spacewatch	·	670 m	MPC · JPL
540437	2017 SC_{71}	—	September 21, 2008	Mount Lemmon	Mount Lemmon Survey	·	1.7 km	MPC · JPL
540438	2017 SF_{71}	—	October 2, 2000	Kitt Peak	Spacewatch	(7744)	1.3 km	MPC · JPL
540439	2017 SG_{72}	—	September 2, 2010	Mount Lemmon	Mount Lemmon Survey	·	650 m	MPC · JPL
540440	2017 SF_{73}	—	March 17, 2005	Kitt Peak	Spacewatch	·	2.4 km	MPC · JPL
540441	2017 ST_{73}	—	January 28, 2003	Kitt Peak	Spacewatch	·	3.4 km	MPC · JPL
540442	2017 SK_{74}	—	January 1, 2008	Mount Lemmon	Mount Lemmon Survey	·	2.1 km	MPC · JPL
540443	2017 SG_{75}	—	March 3, 2005	Kitt Peak	Spacewatch	·	920 m	MPC · JPL
540444	2017 SF_{76}	—	October 21, 2006	Kitt Peak	Spacewatch	·	2.5 km	MPC · JPL
540445	2017 SW_{76}	—	February 16, 2015	Haleakala	Pan-STARRS 1	·	1.4 km	MPC · JPL
540446	2017 SF_{77}	—	August 28, 2006	Siding Spring	SSS	·	2.9 km	MPC · JPL
540447	2017 SH_{77}	—	November 20, 2012	Catalina	CSS	·	2.8 km	MPC · JPL
540448	2017 SJ_{77}	—	March 25, 2011	Haleakala	Pan-STARRS 1	JUN	1.1 km	MPC · JPL
540449	2017 SH_{78}	—	October 6, 2012	Kitt Peak	Spacewatch	·	3.1 km	MPC · JPL
540450	2017 SV_{78}	—	September 24, 2008	Mount Lemmon	Mount Lemmon Survey	·	2.0 km	MPC · JPL
540451	2017 SW_{78}	—	January 31, 2006	Kitt Peak	Spacewatch	NEM	2.0 km	MPC · JPL
540452	2017 SO_{79}	—	December 31, 2008	Kitt Peak	Spacewatch	·	1.4 km	MPC · JPL
540453	2017 SS_{79}	—	October 20, 2008	Mount Lemmon	Mount Lemmon Survey	PAD	1.3 km	MPC · JPL
540454	2017 SF_{81}	—	January 18, 2012	Mount Lemmon	Mount Lemmon Survey	·	480 m	MPC · JPL
540455	2017 SV_{81}	—	August 19, 2006	Kitt Peak	Spacewatch	·	2.0 km	MPC · JPL
540456	2017 SE_{82}	—	October 7, 2004	Socorro	LINEAR	·	1.5 km	MPC · JPL
540457	2017 SF_{82}	—	January 5, 2006	Kitt Peak	Spacewatch	·	720 m	MPC · JPL
540458	2017 SJ_{82}	—	January 29, 2007	Kitt Peak	Spacewatch	HNS	1.2 km	MPC · JPL
540459	2017 SN_{82}	—	August 24, 2007	Kitt Peak	Spacewatch	KOR	1.2 km	MPC · JPL
540460	2017 SS_{82}	—	October 9, 2012	Kitt Peak	Spacewatch	·	2.1 km	MPC · JPL
540461	2017 SY_{82}	—	December 1, 2008	Kitt Peak	Spacewatch	·	960 m	MPC · JPL
540462	2017 SZ_{82}	—	December 5, 2007	Kitt Peak	Spacewatch	·	510 m	MPC · JPL
540463	2017 SA_{83}	—	February 2, 2006	Mount Lemmon	Mount Lemmon Survey	JUN	830 m	MPC · JPL
540464	2017 SD_{83}	—	September 17, 2004	Kitt Peak	Spacewatch	HNS	960 m	MPC · JPL
540465	2017 SK_{83}	—	January 15, 2005	Kitt Peak	Spacewatch	·	1.7 km	MPC · JPL
540466	2017 SW_{83}	—	October 20, 2008	Kitt Peak	Spacewatch	·	1.9 km	MPC · JPL
540467	2017 SX_{83}	—	January 17, 2007	Kitt Peak	Spacewatch	NYS	950 m	MPC · JPL
540468	2017 SH_{84}	—	September 13, 2007	Mount Lemmon	Mount Lemmon Survey	·	2.0 km	MPC · JPL
540469	2017 SN_{84}	—	October 26, 2009	Kitt Peak	Spacewatch	·	1.0 km	MPC · JPL
540470	2017 SV_{84}	—	December 18, 2001	Socorro	LINEAR	·	2.1 km	MPC · JPL
540471	2017 SB_{85}	—	October 1, 2008	Kitt Peak	Spacewatch	·	1.6 km	MPC · JPL
540472	2017 SC_{85}	—	October 23, 2008	Kitt Peak	Spacewatch	·	2.0 km	MPC · JPL
540473	2017 SM_{85}	—	November 22, 2009	Mount Lemmon	Mount Lemmon Survey	·	930 m	MPC · JPL
540474	2017 SV_{85}	—	October 7, 2004	Socorro	LINEAR	·	1.7 km	MPC · JPL
540475	2017 SY_{85}	—	October 15, 2004	Mount Lemmon	Mount Lemmon Survey	·	1.7 km	MPC · JPL
540476	2017 SA_{86}	—	October 8, 2008	Kitt Peak	Spacewatch	AGN	1.0 km	MPC · JPL
540477	2017 SB_{86}	—	March 14, 2007	Mount Lemmon	Mount Lemmon Survey	·	1.9 km	MPC · JPL
540478	2017 SG_{86}	—	April 17, 2009	Kitt Peak	Spacewatch	·	3.3 km	MPC · JPL
540479	2017 SH_{86}	—	January 7, 2006	Mount Lemmon	Mount Lemmon Survey	·	1.2 km	MPC · JPL
540480	2017 SK_{86}	—	April 4, 2003	Kitt Peak	Spacewatch	·	620 m	MPC · JPL
540481	2017 SR_{86}	—	August 9, 2013	Haleakala	Pan-STARRS 1	MAS	780 m	MPC · JPL
540482	2017 SR_{87}	—	September 20, 2000	Kitt Peak	Spacewatch	·	1.4 km	MPC · JPL
540483	2017 ST_{87}	—	September 30, 2007	Kitt Peak	Spacewatch	·	1.7 km	MPC · JPL
540484	2017 SY_{87}	—	November 18, 2000	Kitt Peak	Spacewatch	·	1.7 km	MPC · JPL
540485	2017 SZ_{87}	—	November 27, 2006	Kitt Peak	Spacewatch	NYS	1.2 km	MPC · JPL
540486	2017 SF_{88}	—	March 2, 2011	Mount Lemmon	Mount Lemmon Survey	·	1.4 km	MPC · JPL
540487	2017 SH_{88}	—	October 13, 2010	Mount Lemmon	Mount Lemmon Survey	·	840 m	MPC · JPL
540488	2017 SU_{88}	—	September 26, 2008	Mount Lemmon	Mount Lemmon Survey	EUN	1.2 km	MPC · JPL
540489	2017 SX_{88}	—	December 21, 2007	Mount Lemmon	Mount Lemmon Survey	·	2.8 km	MPC · JPL
540490	2017 SS_{89}	—	September 23, 2008	Kitt Peak	Spacewatch	HNS	980 m	MPC · JPL
540491	2017 SY_{89}	—	July 2, 2013	Haleakala	Pan-STARRS 1	·	1.1 km	MPC · JPL
540492	2017 SP_{90}	—	October 12, 2013	Nogales	M. Schwartz, P. R. Holvorcem	·	1.4 km	MPC · JPL
540493	2017 SO_{91}	—	December 25, 2005	Kitt Peak	Spacewatch	·	1.3 km	MPC · JPL
540494	2017 SW_{91}	—	August 28, 2013	Catalina	CSS	·	1.3 km	MPC · JPL
540495	2017 SD_{92}	—	April 12, 2004	Kitt Peak	Spacewatch	·	3.2 km	MPC · JPL
540496	2017 SM_{93}	—	September 15, 2004	Kitt Peak	Spacewatch	·	1.4 km	MPC · JPL
540497	2017 SN_{93}	—	September 13, 2005	Kitt Peak	Spacewatch	·	950 m	MPC · JPL
540498	2017 ST_{93}	—	February 27, 2006	Kitt Peak	Spacewatch	AGN	1.0 km	MPC · JPL
540499	2017 SV_{93}	—	November 20, 2009	Mount Lemmon	Mount Lemmon Survey	·	1.1 km	MPC · JPL
540500	2017 SC_{94}	—	October 2, 2008	Kitt Peak	Spacewatch	HOF	2.2 km	MPC · JPL

== 540501–540600 ==
back to top

Designation			Discovery			Properties		Ref
Permanent	Provisional	Named after	Date	Site	Discoverer(s)	Category	Diam.	Ref
540501	2017 SG_{94}	—	October 4, 2004	Kitt Peak	Spacewatch	·	1.1 km	MPC · JPL
540502	2017 SN_{94}	—	February 2, 2009	Mount Lemmon	Mount Lemmon Survey	·	1.5 km	MPC · JPL
540503	2017 ST_{95}	—	November 10, 2013	Mount Lemmon	Mount Lemmon Survey	·	1.5 km	MPC · JPL
540504	2017 SU_{95}	—	January 6, 2010	Kitt Peak	Spacewatch	·	1.8 km	MPC · JPL
540505	2017 SX_{95}	—	April 1, 2011	Kitt Peak	Spacewatch	·	1.7 km	MPC · JPL
540506	2017 SD_{96}	—	October 6, 2008	Mount Lemmon	Mount Lemmon Survey	MRX	860 m	MPC · JPL
540507	2017 SP_{96}	—	January 8, 2010	Mount Lemmon	Mount Lemmon Survey	HOF	3.5 km	MPC · JPL
540508	2017 ST_{96}	—	January 11, 2008	Kitt Peak	Spacewatch	·	2.0 km	MPC · JPL
540509	2017 SV_{96}	—	October 30, 2009	Mount Lemmon	Mount Lemmon Survey	·	1.3 km	MPC · JPL
540510	2017 SE_{97}	—	September 23, 2008	Kitt Peak	Spacewatch	HOF	2.7 km	MPC · JPL
540511	2017 SJ_{97}	—	February 25, 1995	Kitt Peak	Spacewatch	KOR	1.8 km	MPC · JPL
540512	2017 ST_{97}	—	November 30, 2003	Kitt Peak	Spacewatch	KOR	1.3 km	MPC · JPL
540513	2017 SG_{98}	—	November 17, 2001	Kitt Peak	Spacewatch	·	1.5 km	MPC · JPL
540514	2017 SK_{98}	—	February 26, 2012	Haleakala	Pan-STARRS 1	·	680 m	MPC · JPL
540515	2017 SN_{98}	—	December 3, 2004	Kitt Peak	Spacewatch	AEO	1.1 km	MPC · JPL
540516	2017 SB_{99}	—	October 7, 2008	Mount Lemmon	Mount Lemmon Survey	·	1.4 km	MPC · JPL
540517	2017 SR_{99}	—	November 25, 2005	Catalina	CSS	·	1.3 km	MPC · JPL
540518	2017 SM_{100}	—	December 4, 2005	Kitt Peak	Spacewatch	·	1.3 km	MPC · JPL
540519	2017 SH_{101}	—	January 12, 2008	Kitt Peak	Spacewatch	TIR	2.9 km	MPC · JPL
540520	2017 SD_{102}	—	October 6, 2012	Haleakala	Pan-STARRS 1	·	1.8 km	MPC · JPL
540521	2017 SF_{102}	—	March 15, 2004	Kitt Peak	Spacewatch	EOS	1.7 km	MPC · JPL
540522	2017 SN_{102}	—	October 19, 2006	Kitt Peak	Spacewatch	NYS	970 m	MPC · JPL
540523	2017 SS_{102}	—	April 26, 2006	Kitt Peak	Spacewatch	·	2.0 km	MPC · JPL
540524	2017 ST_{102}	—	September 8, 2007	Anderson Mesa	LONEOS	·	820 m	MPC · JPL
540525	2017 SZ_{102}	—	January 15, 2009	Kitt Peak	Spacewatch	·	3.5 km	MPC · JPL
540526	2017 SB_{103}	—	November 9, 2009	Kitt Peak	Spacewatch	·	1.0 km	MPC · JPL
540527	2017 SD_{103}	—	September 9, 2008	Catalina	CSS	·	2.2 km	MPC · JPL
540528	2017 SJ_{103}	—	September 17, 2013	Mount Lemmon	Mount Lemmon Survey	MAR	1.1 km	MPC · JPL
540529	2017 ST_{103}	—	October 22, 2008	Kitt Peak	Spacewatch	·	2.0 km	MPC · JPL
540530	2017 SU_{104}	—	October 9, 2004	Kitt Peak	Spacewatch	·	1.6 km	MPC · JPL
540531	2017 SF_{105}	—	October 1, 2000	Socorro	LINEAR	·	4.2 km	MPC · JPL
540532	2017 SG_{105}	—	November 20, 2007	Mount Lemmon	Mount Lemmon Survey	·	870 m	MPC · JPL
540533	2017 SO_{105}	—	November 27, 2008	La Sagra	OAM	·	2.1 km	MPC · JPL
540534	2017 SK_{106}	—	August 27, 2006	Kitt Peak	Spacewatch	·	2.7 km	MPC · JPL
540535	2017 SN_{106}	—	August 21, 2004	Siding Spring	SSS	ADE	1.8 km	MPC · JPL
540536	2017 SO_{106}	—	March 11, 2007	Mount Lemmon	Mount Lemmon Survey	·	1.0 km	MPC · JPL
540537	2017 SW_{106}	—	June 29, 2005	Kitt Peak	Spacewatch	VER	2.9 km	MPC · JPL
540538	2017 SX_{106}	—	October 21, 2006	Kitt Peak	Spacewatch	·	3.4 km	MPC · JPL
540539	2017 SE_{107}	—	May 13, 2004	Socorro	LINEAR	·	1.7 km	MPC · JPL
540540	2017 SD_{108}	—	November 19, 2007	Mount Lemmon	Mount Lemmon Survey	·	3.1 km	MPC · JPL
540541	2017 SU_{108}	—	September 27, 2006	Kitt Peak	Spacewatch	EOS	1.8 km	MPC · JPL
540542	2017 SW_{108}	—	June 27, 2011	Kitt Peak	Spacewatch	·	2.6 km	MPC · JPL
540543	2017 SA_{109}	—	October 25, 2003	Kitt Peak	Spacewatch	·	960 m	MPC · JPL
540544	2017 SL_{112}	—	September 17, 1995	Kitt Peak	Spacewatch	·	1.5 km	MPC · JPL
540545	2017 SO_{113}	—	November 11, 2006	Kitt Peak	Spacewatch	·	3.1 km	MPC · JPL
540546	2017 SN_{114}	—	January 5, 2006	Kitt Peak	Spacewatch	ADE	2.1 km	MPC · JPL
540547	2017 SO_{114}	—	May 21, 2006	Mount Lemmon	Mount Lemmon Survey	·	1.9 km	MPC · JPL
540548	2017 SS_{114}	—	October 20, 2006	Mount Lemmon	Mount Lemmon Survey	·	3.7 km	MPC · JPL
540549	2017 SU_{114}	—	October 1, 2003	Kitt Peak	Spacewatch	·	2.1 km	MPC · JPL
540550	2017 SG_{115}	—	March 14, 2011	Mount Lemmon	Mount Lemmon Survey	·	1.4 km	MPC · JPL
540551	2017 SD_{118}	—	February 20, 2006	Kitt Peak	Spacewatch	·	2.2 km	MPC · JPL
540552	2017 SF_{118}	—	June 27, 2004	Siding Spring	SSS	·	1.7 km	MPC · JPL
540553	2017 SZ_{123}	—	January 3, 2009	Kitt Peak	Spacewatch	·	680 m	MPC · JPL
540554	2017 SX_{124}	—	January 26, 2006	Kitt Peak	Spacewatch	·	740 m	MPC · JPL
540555	2017 SJ_{125}	—	November 7, 2012	Kitt Peak	Spacewatch	·	3.0 km	MPC · JPL
540556	2017 SN_{125}	—	July 30, 2008	Mount Lemmon	Mount Lemmon Survey	·	1.5 km	MPC · JPL
540557	2017 SR_{125}	—	February 9, 2014	Kitt Peak	Spacewatch	EOS	1.7 km	MPC · JPL
540558	2017 SZ_{125}	—	February 23, 2007	Kitt Peak	Spacewatch	·	1.1 km	MPC · JPL
540559	2017 SC_{126}	—	March 4, 2005	Kitt Peak	Spacewatch	·	1.7 km	MPC · JPL
540560	2017 SK_{126}	—	April 29, 2011	Mount Lemmon	Mount Lemmon Survey	·	1.8 km	MPC · JPL
540561	2017 SR_{126}	—	October 17, 2006	Mount Lemmon	Mount Lemmon Survey	·	3.0 km	MPC · JPL
540562	2017 SX_{126}	—	January 31, 2008	Mount Lemmon	Mount Lemmon Survey	V	570 m	MPC · JPL
540563	2017 SZ_{126}	—	February 1, 2009	Kitt Peak	Spacewatch	·	1.8 km	MPC · JPL
540564	2017 SA_{127}	—	December 13, 1999	Kitt Peak	Spacewatch	·	2.2 km	MPC · JPL
540565	2017 SD_{127}	—	November 18, 2006	Mount Lemmon	Mount Lemmon Survey	LIX	3.0 km	MPC · JPL
540566	2017 SJ_{127}	—	January 18, 2008	Mount Lemmon	Mount Lemmon Survey	·	2.4 km	MPC · JPL
540567	2017 SL_{127}	—	January 30, 2009	Mount Lemmon	Mount Lemmon Survey	·	1.7 km	MPC · JPL
540568	2017 SR_{127}	—	December 10, 2012	Haleakala	Pan-STARRS 1	·	1.8 km	MPC · JPL
540569	2017 SE_{128}	—	September 3, 2008	Kitt Peak	Spacewatch	EUN	1.5 km	MPC · JPL
540570	2017 SF_{128}	—	December 20, 2009	Mount Lemmon	Mount Lemmon Survey	·	1.7 km	MPC · JPL
540571	2017 SM_{128}	—	February 26, 2008	Mount Lemmon	Mount Lemmon Survey	·	2.4 km	MPC · JPL
540572	2017 SP_{128}	—	September 30, 2006	Mount Lemmon	Mount Lemmon Survey	·	3.5 km	MPC · JPL
540573	2017 SU_{128}	—	October 9, 2005	Kitt Peak	Spacewatch	·	1.1 km	MPC · JPL
540574	2017 SB_{130}	—	April 20, 2006	Kitt Peak	Spacewatch	·	2.2 km	MPC · JPL
540575	2017 SP_{130}	—	February 8, 2007	Mount Lemmon	Mount Lemmon Survey	·	1.6 km	MPC · JPL
540576	2017 SP_{131}	—	December 28, 2007	Kitt Peak	Spacewatch	THM	1.8 km	MPC · JPL
540577	2017 SY_{131}	—	September 17, 2004	Kitt Peak	Spacewatch	·	1.6 km	MPC · JPL
540578	2017 SF_{132}	—	September 25, 2006	Catalina	CSS	TIR	2.7 km	MPC · JPL
540579	2017 TQ	—	October 23, 2012	Mount Lemmon	Mount Lemmon Survey	H	480 m	MPC · JPL
540580	2017 TA_{7}	—	October 9, 2012	Haleakala	Pan-STARRS 1	·	2.0 km	MPC · JPL
540581	2017 TD_{7}	—	December 8, 2010	Mount Lemmon	Mount Lemmon Survey	·	1.3 km	MPC · JPL
540582	2017 TE_{7}	—	November 8, 2007	Kitt Peak	Spacewatch	·	1.7 km	MPC · JPL
540583	2017 TL_{7}	—	November 12, 2010	Mount Lemmon	Mount Lemmon Survey	3:2	4.3 km	MPC · JPL
540584	2017 TS_{7}	—	November 19, 2000	Socorro	LINEAR	·	710 m	MPC · JPL
540585	2017 TR_{8}	—	November 27, 2013	Kitt Peak	Spacewatch	·	1.3 km	MPC · JPL
540586	2017 TZ_{8}	—	October 20, 2012	Haleakala	Pan-STARRS 1	·	2.4 km	MPC · JPL
540587	2017 TC_{10}	—	October 3, 2013	Mount Lemmon	Mount Lemmon Survey	EUN	900 m	MPC · JPL
540588	2017 TJ_{10}	—	November 12, 2001	Socorro	LINEAR	·	2.5 km	MPC · JPL
540589	2017 TK_{10}	—	October 8, 2008	Kitt Peak	Spacewatch	·	1.4 km	MPC · JPL
540590	2017 TO_{10}	—	December 3, 2004	Kitt Peak	Spacewatch	·	720 m	MPC · JPL
540591	2017 TW_{10}	—	October 4, 2006	Mount Lemmon	Mount Lemmon Survey	·	3.0 km	MPC · JPL
540592	2017 TW_{11}	—	September 30, 2006	Mount Lemmon	Mount Lemmon Survey	·	1.1 km	MPC · JPL
540593	2017 TB_{13}	—	April 2, 2016	Mount Lemmon	Mount Lemmon Survey	·	1.1 km	MPC · JPL
540594	2017 TD_{13}	—	January 31, 2006	Kitt Peak	Spacewatch	·	1.5 km	MPC · JPL
540595	2017 TE_{13}	—	December 15, 2004	Kitt Peak	Spacewatch	·	1.5 km	MPC · JPL
540596	2017 UP_{3}	—	October 21, 2008	Kitt Peak	Spacewatch	·	2.2 km	MPC · JPL
540597	2017 UQ_{3}	—	October 10, 2008	Mount Lemmon	Mount Lemmon Survey	WIT	990 m	MPC · JPL
540598	2017 UM_{4}	—	April 1, 2011	Mount Lemmon	Mount Lemmon Survey	H	370 m	MPC · JPL
540599	2017 UY_{6}	—	April 6, 2005	Catalina	CSS	·	1.9 km	MPC · JPL
540600	2017 UN_{8}	—	October 31, 2008	Mount Lemmon	Mount Lemmon Survey	·	2.2 km	MPC · JPL

== 540601–540700 ==
back to top

Designation			Discovery			Properties		Ref
Permanent	Provisional	Named after	Date	Site	Discoverer(s)	Category	Diam.	Ref
540601	2017 UU_{11}	—	November 22, 2006	Catalina	CSS	·	3.2 km	MPC · JPL
540602	2017 UX_{11}	—	August 20, 2011	Haleakala	Pan-STARRS 1	EOS	1.6 km	MPC · JPL
540603	2017 UM_{13}	—	January 25, 2009	Kitt Peak	Spacewatch	·	1.4 km	MPC · JPL
540604	2017 UO_{13}	—	January 3, 2009	Mount Lemmon	Mount Lemmon Survey	·	3.3 km	MPC · JPL
540605	2017 UT_{13}	—	August 28, 2006	Catalina	CSS	·	2.6 km	MPC · JPL
540606	2017 UW_{14}	—	September 15, 2007	Catalina	CSS	·	2.4 km	MPC · JPL
540607	2017 UR_{15}	—	March 10, 2016	Haleakala	Pan-STARRS 1	V	580 m	MPC · JPL
540608	2017 UT_{15}	—	October 20, 2008	Kitt Peak	Spacewatch	·	1.9 km	MPC · JPL
540609	2017 UG_{16}	—	October 1, 1995	Kitt Peak	Spacewatch	·	2.1 km	MPC · JPL
540610	2017 UF_{17}	—	August 27, 2006	Kitt Peak	Spacewatch	·	2.4 km	MPC · JPL
540611	2017 UJ_{18}	—	August 25, 2004	Kitt Peak	Spacewatch	·	1.5 km	MPC · JPL
540612	2017 UD_{19}	—	July 30, 2008	Kitt Peak	Spacewatch	·	1.6 km	MPC · JPL
540613	2017 UJ_{19}	—	November 15, 2014	Mount Lemmon	Mount Lemmon Survey	·	610 m	MPC · JPL
540614	2017 UR_{19}	—	February 27, 2015	Haleakala	Pan-STARRS 1	·	1.5 km	MPC · JPL
540615	2017 UB_{20}	—	December 10, 2013	Mount Lemmon	Mount Lemmon Survey	·	1.7 km	MPC · JPL
540616	2017 UF_{20}	—	September 25, 2008	Mount Lemmon	Mount Lemmon Survey	EUN	1.0 km	MPC · JPL
540617	2017 UJ_{20}	—	April 29, 2003	Kitt Peak	Spacewatch	·	1.4 km	MPC · JPL
540618	2017 UJ_{21}	—	November 24, 2013	Haleakala	Pan-STARRS 1	·	1.2 km	MPC · JPL
540619	2017 UL_{21}	—	October 11, 2007	Kitt Peak	Spacewatch	·	1.5 km	MPC · JPL
540620	2017 UM_{21}	—	May 14, 2009	Kitt Peak	Spacewatch	·	1.2 km	MPC · JPL
540621	2017 UR_{21}	—	May 9, 2011	Mount Lemmon	Mount Lemmon Survey	HOF	2.5 km	MPC · JPL
540622	2017 US_{21}	—	January 31, 2006	Kitt Peak	Spacewatch	·	1.4 km	MPC · JPL
540623	2017 UU_{22}	—	February 16, 2015	Haleakala	Pan-STARRS 1	HOF	2.5 km	MPC · JPL
540624	2017 UZ_{22}	—	October 25, 2008	Mount Lemmon	Mount Lemmon Survey	·	1.7 km	MPC · JPL
540625	2017 UA_{23}	—	December 15, 2009	Mount Lemmon	Mount Lemmon Survey	·	1.1 km	MPC · JPL
540626	2017 UF_{23}	—	September 23, 2008	Mount Lemmon	Mount Lemmon Survey	·	1.4 km	MPC · JPL
540627	2017 US_{23}	—	March 27, 2003	Kitt Peak	Spacewatch	·	2.5 km	MPC · JPL
540628	2017 UH_{24}	—	October 10, 2010	Mount Lemmon	Mount Lemmon Survey	·	780 m	MPC · JPL
540629	2017 UX_{24}	—	November 23, 2014	Mount Lemmon	Mount Lemmon Survey	·	510 m	MPC · JPL
540630	2017 UM_{25}	—	January 20, 2015	Haleakala	Pan-STARRS 1	·	2.9 km	MPC · JPL
540631	2017 UR_{25}	—	February 18, 2015	Haleakala	Pan-STARRS 1	KOR	1.3 km	MPC · JPL
540632	2017 UD_{26}	—	October 6, 2008	Mount Lemmon	Mount Lemmon Survey	HOF	2.3 km	MPC · JPL
540633	2017 UE_{26}	—	October 30, 2013	Haleakala	Pan-STARRS 1	·	1.3 km	MPC · JPL
540634	2017 UJ_{26}	—	November 14, 2012	Kitt Peak	Spacewatch	·	1.9 km	MPC · JPL
540635	2017 UG_{27}	—	November 26, 2013	Haleakala	Pan-STARRS 1	·	1.1 km	MPC · JPL
540636	2017 UN_{27}	—	September 6, 2008	Mount Lemmon	Mount Lemmon Survey	·	1.4 km	MPC · JPL
540637	2017 UL_{28}	—	February 27, 2015	Haleakala	Pan-STARRS 1	·	1.4 km	MPC · JPL
540638	2017 UM_{28}	—	October 29, 2008	Mount Lemmon	Mount Lemmon Survey	·	1.3 km	MPC · JPL
540639	2017 UP_{28}	—	September 17, 2003	Kitt Peak	Spacewatch	DOR	1.8 km	MPC · JPL
540640	2017 UH_{29}	—	November 10, 2004	Kitt Peak	Spacewatch	·	1.7 km	MPC · JPL
540641	2017 UL_{29}	—	November 2, 2013	Kitt Peak	Spacewatch	·	1.2 km	MPC · JPL
540642	2017 UM_{29}	—	April 12, 2016	Haleakala	Pan-STARRS 1	·	1.7 km	MPC · JPL
540643	2017 UO_{29}	—	February 2, 2006	Kitt Peak	Spacewatch	·	2.3 km	MPC · JPL
540644	2017 UW_{29}	—	November 13, 2012	Mount Lemmon	Mount Lemmon Survey	·	1.8 km	MPC · JPL
540645	2017 UX_{29}	—	October 27, 2008	Kitt Peak	Spacewatch	·	1.6 km	MPC · JPL
540646	2017 UM_{31}	—	February 18, 2015	Haleakala	Pan-STARRS 1	·	1.4 km	MPC · JPL
540647	2017 UW_{31}	—	September 13, 2013	Mount Lemmon	Mount Lemmon Survey	·	1.1 km	MPC · JPL
540648	2017 UT_{32}	—	October 4, 2004	Kitt Peak	Spacewatch	WIT	1.0 km	MPC · JPL
540649	2017 UB_{33}	—	September 22, 2003	Anderson Mesa	LONEOS	·	1.7 km	MPC · JPL
540650	2017 UK_{33}	—	October 21, 2003	Kitt Peak	Spacewatch	·	2.0 km	MPC · JPL
540651	2017 US_{33}	—	January 18, 2009	Kitt Peak	Spacewatch	·	550 m	MPC · JPL
540652	2017 UA_{34}	—	December 17, 2007	Mount Lemmon	Mount Lemmon Survey	·	1.9 km	MPC · JPL
540653	2017 UE_{34}	—	September 25, 2008	Kitt Peak	Spacewatch	·	1.5 km	MPC · JPL
540654	2017 UF_{34}	—	August 26, 2012	Haleakala	Pan-STARRS 1	·	1.5 km	MPC · JPL
540655	2017 UE_{35}	—	September 24, 2008	Kitt Peak	Spacewatch	·	1.7 km	MPC · JPL
540656	2017 UK_{35}	—	September 28, 1994	Kitt Peak	Spacewatch	(3025)	5.3 km	MPC · JPL
540657	2017 UO_{35}	—	October 10, 2012	Haleakala	Pan-STARRS 1	·	2.2 km	MPC · JPL
540658	2017 UW_{36}	—	October 13, 2007	Kitt Peak	Spacewatch	KOR	1.3 km	MPC · JPL
540659	2017 UY_{36}	—	January 26, 2006	Kitt Peak	Spacewatch	·	1.6 km	MPC · JPL
540660	2017 UM_{37}	—	October 10, 2005	Kitt Peak	Spacewatch	·	930 m	MPC · JPL
540661	2017 UR_{37}	—	October 16, 2006	Catalina	CSS	·	2.6 km	MPC · JPL
540662	2017 UU_{37}	—	April 5, 2003	Kitt Peak	Spacewatch	·	5.0 km	MPC · JPL
540663	2017 UV_{37}	—	October 25, 2005	Mount Lemmon	Mount Lemmon Survey	·	1.1 km	MPC · JPL
540664	2017 UL_{38}	—	October 18, 1998	Kitt Peak	Spacewatch	SUL	1.5 km	MPC · JPL
540665	2017 UU_{38}	—	February 5, 2011	Catalina	CSS	·	890 m	MPC · JPL
540666	2017 UK_{39}	—	March 18, 2009	Kitt Peak	Spacewatch	·	2.7 km	MPC · JPL
540667	2017 UE_{40}	—	December 29, 2008	Mount Lemmon	Mount Lemmon Survey	NAE	2.3 km	MPC · JPL
540668	2017 US_{41}	—	November 27, 2013	Haleakala	Pan-STARRS 1	HNS	1.3 km	MPC · JPL
540669	2017 UR_{42}	—	September 1, 2008	Siding Spring	SSS	JUN	1.1 km	MPC · JPL
540670	2017 UU_{44}	—	April 27, 2008	Mount Lemmon	Mount Lemmon Survey	H	560 m	MPC · JPL
540671	2017 UT_{45}	—	September 11, 2007	Kitt Peak	Spacewatch	·	1.9 km	MPC · JPL
540672	2017 UV_{45}	—	September 25, 2006	Mount Lemmon	Mount Lemmon Survey	·	2.0 km	MPC · JPL
540673	2017 UJ_{46}	—	October 23, 2006	Mount Lemmon	Mount Lemmon Survey	VER	2.7 km	MPC · JPL
540674	2017 UT_{46}	—	April 21, 2006	Kitt Peak	Spacewatch	·	1.7 km	MPC · JPL
540675	2017 UU_{46}	—	November 28, 2013	Mount Lemmon	Mount Lemmon Survey	·	1.0 km	MPC · JPL
540676	2017 UC_{47}	—	April 22, 2012	Kitt Peak	Spacewatch	·	950 m	MPC · JPL
540677	2017 UW_{47}	—	September 9, 2008	Catalina	CSS	·	1.6 km	MPC · JPL
540678	2017 UN_{48}	—	March 11, 2014	Mount Lemmon	Mount Lemmon Survey	·	2.0 km	MPC · JPL
540679	2017 UE_{49}	—	March 25, 2014	Mount Lemmon	Mount Lemmon Survey	·	2.7 km	MPC · JPL
540680	2017 UZ_{49}	—	January 13, 2015	Haleakala	Pan-STARRS 1	·	660 m	MPC · JPL
540681	2017 UH_{50}	—	October 10, 2008	Mount Lemmon	Mount Lemmon Survey	EUN	1.2 km	MPC · JPL
540682	2017 UA_{51}	—	January 16, 2015	Haleakala	Pan-STARRS 1	·	1.0 km	MPC · JPL
540683	2017 VO_{2}	—	March 29, 2009	Catalina	CSS	·	2.8 km	MPC · JPL
540684	2017 VS_{2}	—	March 25, 2015	Haleakala	Pan-STARRS 1	EOS	1.9 km	MPC · JPL
540685	2017 VU_{2}	—	November 28, 2013	Mount Lemmon	Mount Lemmon Survey	·	2.7 km	MPC · JPL
540686	2017 VL_{3}	—	January 17, 2013	Haleakala	Pan-STARRS 1	·	2.2 km	MPC · JPL
540687	2017 VJ_{4}	—	September 30, 2006	Mount Lemmon	Mount Lemmon Survey	·	2.7 km	MPC · JPL
540688	2017 VO_{4}	—	March 3, 2010	WISE	WISE	·	1.4 km	MPC · JPL
540689	2017 VS_{4}	—	April 18, 2010	WISE	WISE	·	2.0 km	MPC · JPL
540690	2017 VG_{5}	—	April 8, 2008	Mount Lemmon	Mount Lemmon Survey	EUP	2.9 km	MPC · JPL
540691	2017 VL_{5}	—	November 27, 2009	Mount Lemmon	Mount Lemmon Survey	(5)	1.2 km	MPC · JPL
540692	2017 VN_{5}	—	May 3, 2005	Kitt Peak	Spacewatch	H	480 m	MPC · JPL
540693	2017 VU_{5}	—	November 1, 2000	Socorro	LINEAR	·	1.4 km	MPC · JPL
540694	2017 VB_{6}	—	March 21, 2015	Haleakala	Pan-STARRS 1	·	1.3 km	MPC · JPL
540695	2017 VW_{6}	—	November 17, 2009	Catalina	CSS	·	2.5 km	MPC · JPL
540696	2017 VK_{7}	—	September 19, 2006	Kitt Peak	Spacewatch	·	1.7 km	MPC · JPL
540697	2017 VL_{7}	—	March 8, 2014	Mount Lemmon	Mount Lemmon Survey	·	2.7 km	MPC · JPL
540698	2017 VQ_{7}	—	September 19, 2003	Kitt Peak	Spacewatch	·	1.7 km	MPC · JPL
540699	2017 VU_{7}	—	January 17, 2008	Mount Lemmon	Mount Lemmon Survey	·	2.6 km	MPC · JPL
540700	2017 VY_{7}	—	October 9, 2008	Kitt Peak	Spacewatch	·	1.3 km	MPC · JPL

== 540701–540800 ==
back to top

Designation			Discovery			Properties		Ref
Permanent	Provisional	Named after	Date	Site	Discoverer(s)	Category	Diam.	Ref
540701	2017 VV_{8}	—	October 24, 2011	Mount Lemmon	Mount Lemmon Survey	·	3.1 km	MPC · JPL
540702	2017 VQ_{9}	—	September 19, 2011	Haleakala	Pan-STARRS 1	EOS	2.0 km	MPC · JPL
540703	2017 VT_{9}	—	April 1, 2011	Kitt Peak	Spacewatch	EUN	760 m	MPC · JPL
540704	2017 VU_{9}	—	October 10, 2008	Mount Lemmon	Mount Lemmon Survey	EUN	1.2 km	MPC · JPL
540705	2017 VW_{9}	—	March 1, 2008	Kitt Peak	Spacewatch	·	2.4 km	MPC · JPL
540706	2017 VD_{10}	—	November 13, 2013	Mount Lemmon	Mount Lemmon Survey	MAR	1.1 km	MPC · JPL
540707	2017 VT_{10}	—	December 10, 2012	Haleakala	Pan-STARRS 1	·	2.3 km	MPC · JPL
540708	2017 VL_{11}	—	March 26, 2011	Kitt Peak	Spacewatch	·	1.5 km	MPC · JPL
540709	2017 VU_{11}	—	January 29, 2015	Haleakala	Pan-STARRS 1	·	1.6 km	MPC · JPL
540710	2017 VW_{15}	—	January 5, 2002	Kitt Peak	Spacewatch	KON	2.3 km	MPC · JPL
540711	2017 VB_{17}	—	November 20, 2004	Kitt Peak	Spacewatch	·	2.0 km	MPC · JPL
540712	2017 VJ_{17}	—	October 8, 2008	Mount Lemmon	Mount Lemmon Survey	·	1.4 km	MPC · JPL
540713	2017 VW_{17}	—	September 4, 2011	Haleakala	Pan-STARRS 1	·	2.5 km	MPC · JPL
540714	2017 VR_{19}	—	October 22, 2012	Mount Lemmon	Mount Lemmon Survey	·	2.7 km	MPC · JPL
540715	2017 VS_{19}	—	December 11, 2010	Mount Lemmon	Mount Lemmon Survey	·	1.1 km	MPC · JPL
540716	2017 VU_{19}	—	November 9, 2006	Kitt Peak	Spacewatch	·	1.1 km	MPC · JPL
540717	2017 VK_{23}	—	April 30, 2011	Mount Lemmon	Mount Lemmon Survey	·	1.6 km	MPC · JPL
540718	2017 VM_{24}	—	January 26, 2001	Kitt Peak	Spacewatch	·	1.3 km	MPC · JPL
540719	2017 VO_{24}	—	September 21, 2003	Kitt Peak	Spacewatch	·	1.6 km	MPC · JPL
540720	2017 VQ_{24}	—	October 28, 2006	Kitt Peak	Spacewatch	·	2.4 km	MPC · JPL
540721	2017 VH_{25}	—	October 9, 2012	Mount Lemmon	Mount Lemmon Survey	·	1.5 km	MPC · JPL
540722	2017 VO_{25}	—	October 19, 2008	Kitt Peak	Spacewatch	·	1.3 km	MPC · JPL
540723	2017 VT_{25}	—	November 17, 2006	Kitt Peak	Spacewatch	·	3.3 km	MPC · JPL
540724	2017 VX_{25}	—	July 8, 2016	Haleakala	Pan-STARRS 1	·	2.8 km	MPC · JPL
540725	2017 VR_{27}	—	November 21, 2008	Kitt Peak	Spacewatch	·	1.9 km	MPC · JPL
540726	2017 VX_{27}	—	November 20, 2006	Kitt Peak	Spacewatch	·	1.1 km	MPC · JPL
540727	2017 VE_{31}	—	October 1, 2005	Mount Lemmon	Mount Lemmon Survey	·	1.0 km	MPC · JPL
540728	2017 VF_{31}	—	March 21, 2015	Haleakala	Pan-STARRS 1	·	1.4 km	MPC · JPL
540729	2017 VG_{31}	—	October 10, 2004	Kitt Peak	Spacewatch	·	1.2 km	MPC · JPL
540730	2017 VK_{31}	—	November 9, 2004	Catalina	CSS	·	1.4 km	MPC · JPL
540731	2017 VM_{31}	—	March 11, 2002	Kitt Peak	Spacewatch	·	1.6 km	MPC · JPL
540732	2017 VT_{31}	—	February 16, 2015	Haleakala	Pan-STARRS 1	·	1.4 km	MPC · JPL
540733	2017 VW_{31}	—	June 18, 2013	Haleakala	Pan-STARRS 1	·	940 m	MPC · JPL
540734	2017 VV_{32}	—	April 11, 2011	Mount Lemmon	Mount Lemmon Survey	·	1.8 km	MPC · JPL
540735	2017 WR_{2}	—	November 8, 2007	Mount Lemmon	Mount Lemmon Survey	·	630 m	MPC · JPL
540736	2017 WN_{3}	—	November 26, 2006	Kitt Peak	Spacewatch	EOS	1.7 km	MPC · JPL
540737	2017 WP_{3}	—	October 22, 2003	Kitt Peak	Spacewatch	AST	1.7 km	MPC · JPL
540738	2017 WR_{3}	—	September 28, 2003	Kitt Peak	Spacewatch	·	550 m	MPC · JPL
540739	2017 WX_{3}	—	October 2, 2006	Mount Lemmon	Mount Lemmon Survey	·	2.8 km	MPC · JPL
540740	2017 WA_{4}	—	March 12, 2014	Mount Lemmon	Mount Lemmon Survey	EOS	1.7 km	MPC · JPL
540741	2017 WB_{4}	—	August 24, 2011	Haleakala	Pan-STARRS 1	·	2.3 km	MPC · JPL
540742	2017 WN_{4}	—	October 8, 2012	Mount Lemmon	Mount Lemmon Survey	·	1.9 km	MPC · JPL
540743	2017 WP_{4}	—	December 15, 2001	Socorro	LINEAR	·	4.0 km	MPC · JPL
540744	2017 WQ_{4}	—	January 17, 2007	Catalina	CSS	·	1.4 km	MPC · JPL
540745	2017 WC_{5}	—	November 28, 2013	Haleakala	Pan-STARRS 1	·	1.1 km	MPC · JPL
540746	2017 WR_{6}	—	October 23, 2003	Kitt Peak	Spacewatch	·	2.2 km	MPC · JPL
540747	2017 WZ_{7}	—	March 17, 2009	Kitt Peak	Spacewatch	·	620 m	MPC · JPL
540748	2017 WD_{9}	—	November 13, 2006	Kitt Peak	Spacewatch	LIX	2.7 km	MPC · JPL
540749	2017 WN_{9}	—	November 9, 2009	Kitt Peak	Spacewatch	·	1.1 km	MPC · JPL
540750	2017 WT_{9}	—	November 2, 2000	Socorro	LINEAR	·	750 m	MPC · JPL
540751	2017 WX_{9}	—	March 14, 2007	Catalina	CSS	·	4.4 km	MPC · JPL
540752	2017 WO_{12}	—	October 9, 2004	Kitt Peak	Spacewatch	H	470 m	MPC · JPL
540753	2017 WQ_{19}	—	October 9, 2008	Mount Lemmon	Mount Lemmon Survey	·	1.6 km	MPC · JPL
540754	2017 WB_{21}	—	October 30, 2010	Mount Lemmon	Mount Lemmon Survey	·	850 m	MPC · JPL
540755	2017 WH_{21}	—	December 25, 2013	Kitt Peak	Spacewatch	·	1.8 km	MPC · JPL
540756	2017 WW_{21}	—	January 12, 2010	Catalina	CSS	(5)	1.3 km	MPC · JPL
540757	2017 WZ_{23}	—	August 19, 2006	Kitt Peak	Spacewatch	·	1.8 km	MPC · JPL
540758	2017 WB_{24}	—	January 25, 2015	Haleakala	Pan-STARRS 1	·	1.7 km	MPC · JPL
540759	2017 WX_{24}	—	January 15, 2005	Kitt Peak	Spacewatch	·	2.3 km	MPC · JPL
540760	2017 WL_{26}	—	February 10, 2014	Haleakala	Pan-STARRS 1	·	3.4 km	MPC · JPL
540761	2017 WU_{26}	—	August 17, 2012	Haleakala	Pan-STARRS 1	EUN	1.0 km	MPC · JPL
540762	2017 WH_{27}	—	November 7, 2004	Socorro	LINEAR	·	1.8 km	MPC · JPL
540763	2017 WS_{27}	—	July 18, 2013	Haleakala	Pan-STARRS 1	·	1.8 km	MPC · JPL
540764	2017 WH_{29}	—	December 27, 2006	Mount Lemmon	Mount Lemmon Survey	BAR	1.2 km	MPC · JPL
540765	2017 WO_{29}	—	September 21, 2003	Anderson Mesa	LONEOS	GEF	1.3 km	MPC · JPL
540766	2017 WU_{29}	—	October 22, 2006	Siding Spring	SSS	T_{j} (2.98)	3.7 km	MPC · JPL
540767	2017 WV_{29}	—	September 18, 2006	Catalina	CSS	EOS	2.3 km	MPC · JPL
540768	2017 WC_{30}	—	March 3, 1997	Kitt Peak	Spacewatch	·	3.6 km	MPC · JPL
540769	2017 XY_{1}	—	December 18, 2001	Socorro	LINEAR	T_{j} (2.98)	3.2 km	MPC · JPL
540770	2017 XF_{3}	—	October 24, 2008	Siding Spring	SSS	·	3.7 km	MPC · JPL
540771	2017 XJ_{3}	—	October 6, 2005	Mount Lemmon	Mount Lemmon Survey	(5)	1.2 km	MPC · JPL
540772	2017 XM_{3}	—	January 13, 2011	Kitt Peak	Spacewatch	·	1.2 km	MPC · JPL
540773	2017 XQ_{3}	—	October 1, 2003	Kitt Peak	Spacewatch	WIT	960 m	MPC · JPL
540774	2017 XR_{3}	—	June 16, 2012	Haleakala	Pan-STARRS 1	(5)	1.1 km	MPC · JPL
540775	2017 XF_{4}	—	April 3, 2011	Haleakala	Pan-STARRS 1	·	2.0 km	MPC · JPL
540776	2017 XG_{4}	—	February 1, 2008	Catalina	CSS	·	4.6 km	MPC · JPL
540777	2017 XJ_{4}	—	September 17, 2009	Mount Lemmon	Mount Lemmon Survey	·	1.2 km	MPC · JPL
540778	2017 XK_{4}	—	June 4, 2011	Mount Lemmon	Mount Lemmon Survey	·	2.0 km	MPC · JPL
540779	2017 XM_{4}	—	January 21, 2014	Kitt Peak	Spacewatch	AGN	1.1 km	MPC · JPL
540780	2017 XO_{4}	—	June 8, 2016	Haleakala	Pan-STARRS 1	·	1.3 km	MPC · JPL
540781	2017 XS_{4}	—	December 21, 2014	Mount Lemmon	Mount Lemmon Survey	·	540 m	MPC · JPL
540782	2017 XX_{4}	—	March 5, 2008	Mount Lemmon	Mount Lemmon Survey	·	3.0 km	MPC · JPL
540783	2017 XA_{5}	—	February 24, 2010	WISE	WISE	·	3.2 km	MPC · JPL
540784	2017 XN_{5}	—	June 18, 2015	Haleakala	Pan-STARRS 1	·	1.6 km	MPC · JPL
540785	2017 XH_{6}	—	August 7, 2016	Haleakala	Pan-STARRS 1	·	2.7 km	MPC · JPL
540786	2017 XK_{6}	—	September 24, 2011	Haleakala	Pan-STARRS 1	·	3.1 km	MPC · JPL
540787	2017 XL_{6}	—	September 20, 2009	Mount Lemmon	Mount Lemmon Survey	·	1.3 km	MPC · JPL
540788	2017 XV_{6}	—	March 19, 2009	Kitt Peak	Spacewatch	·	2.6 km	MPC · JPL
540789	2017 XJ_{7}	—	January 12, 2010	Mount Lemmon	Mount Lemmon Survey	·	1.2 km	MPC · JPL
540790	2017 XQ_{7}	—	January 30, 2011	Mount Lemmon	Mount Lemmon Survey	·	1.0 km	MPC · JPL
540791	2017 XA_{8}	—	June 11, 2015	Haleakala	Pan-STARRS 1	·	2.9 km	MPC · JPL
540792	2017 XL_{8}	—	September 29, 2003	Kitt Peak	Spacewatch	·	1.9 km	MPC · JPL
540793	2017 XO_{8}	—	August 20, 2009	La Sagra	OAM	·	1.1 km	MPC · JPL
540794	2017 XH_{9}	—	October 9, 2012	Mount Lemmon	Mount Lemmon Survey	HOF	1.9 km	MPC · JPL
540795	2017 XB_{10}	—	September 24, 2012	Kitt Peak	Spacewatch	·	1.7 km	MPC · JPL
540796	2017 XG_{10}	—	November 23, 2006	Kitt Peak	Spacewatch	VER	2.1 km	MPC · JPL
540797	2017 XJ_{10}	—	September 22, 2008	Kitt Peak	Spacewatch	·	1.5 km	MPC · JPL
540798	2017 XM_{10}	—	January 28, 2007	Kitt Peak	Spacewatch	·	1.6 km	MPC · JPL
540799	2017 XN_{10}	—	October 31, 2013	Mount Lemmon	Mount Lemmon Survey	EUN	1.4 km	MPC · JPL
540800	2017 XP_{10}	—	November 26, 2013	Mount Lemmon	Mount Lemmon Survey	·	820 m	MPC · JPL

== 540801–540900 ==
back to top

Designation			Discovery			Properties		Ref
Permanent	Provisional	Named after	Date	Site	Discoverer(s)	Category	Diam.	Ref
540801	2017 XR_{10}	—	September 17, 2004	Kitt Peak	Spacewatch	·	1.3 km	MPC · JPL
540802	2017 XS_{10}	—	December 22, 2012	Haleakala	Pan-STARRS 1	·	2.3 km	MPC · JPL
540803	2017 XW_{10}	—	November 12, 2005	Kitt Peak	Spacewatch	·	1.2 km	MPC · JPL
540804	2017 XD_{11}	—	October 27, 2006	Mount Lemmon	Mount Lemmon Survey	THM	1.5 km	MPC · JPL
540805	2017 XE_{11}	—	October 22, 2006	Kitt Peak	Spacewatch	·	2.4 km	MPC · JPL
540806	2017 XF_{11}	—	November 29, 2005	Kitt Peak	Spacewatch	·	1.0 km	MPC · JPL
540807	2017 XO_{11}	—	November 26, 2005	Kitt Peak	Spacewatch	·	1.3 km	MPC · JPL
540808	2017 XT_{11}	—	August 3, 2004	Siding Spring	SSS	·	1.3 km	MPC · JPL
540809	2017 XH_{12}	—	April 22, 2007	Kitt Peak	Spacewatch	·	1.5 km	MPC · JPL
540810	2017 XJ_{12}	—	September 10, 2007	Kitt Peak	Spacewatch	KOR	1.2 km	MPC · JPL
540811	2017 XK_{12}	—	September 30, 2006	Mount Lemmon	Mount Lemmon Survey	·	2.6 km	MPC · JPL
540812	2017 XO_{12}	—	October 10, 2012	Mount Lemmon	Mount Lemmon Survey	·	2.4 km	MPC · JPL
540813	2017 XU_{12}	—	October 27, 2006	Mount Lemmon	Mount Lemmon Survey	·	3.2 km	MPC · JPL
540814	2017 XJ_{13}	—	September 6, 2013	Kitt Peak	Spacewatch	·	1.3 km	MPC · JPL
540815	2017 XX_{13}	—	January 25, 2006	Kitt Peak	Spacewatch	·	1.4 km	MPC · JPL
540816	2017 XA_{14}	—	November 18, 2008	Kitt Peak	Spacewatch	AST	1.7 km	MPC · JPL
540817	2017 XK_{14}	—	January 20, 2015	Haleakala	Pan-STARRS 1	·	910 m	MPC · JPL
540818	2017 XP_{14}	—	August 10, 2007	Kitt Peak	Spacewatch	·	1.8 km	MPC · JPL
540819	2017 XT_{14}	—	January 28, 2015	Haleakala	Pan-STARRS 1	·	1.7 km	MPC · JPL
540820	2017 XY_{14}	—	November 12, 2012	Kitt Peak	Spacewatch	·	1.7 km	MPC · JPL
540821	2017 XA_{15}	—	September 28, 2003	Kitt Peak	Spacewatch	HOF	2.3 km	MPC · JPL
540822	2017 XG_{15}	—	September 28, 2011	Kitt Peak	Spacewatch	VER	2.6 km	MPC · JPL
540823	2017 XO_{15}	—	April 22, 2004	Kitt Peak	Spacewatch	NYS	1.1 km	MPC · JPL
540824	2017 XY_{15}	—	May 4, 2006	Mount Lemmon	Mount Lemmon Survey	AST	1.7 km	MPC · JPL
540825	2017 XB_{16}	—	May 8, 2011	Mount Lemmon	Mount Lemmon Survey	·	1.8 km	MPC · JPL
540826	2017 XF_{16}	—	October 31, 2008	Kitt Peak	Spacewatch	·	1.8 km	MPC · JPL
540827	2017 XJ_{16}	—	January 29, 2009	Kitt Peak	Spacewatch	·	2.0 km	MPC · JPL
540828	2017 XL_{16}	—	February 24, 2014	Haleakala	Pan-STARRS 1	EOS	1.7 km	MPC · JPL
540829	2017 XQ_{16}	—	September 25, 2008	Kitt Peak	Spacewatch	(7744)	1.3 km	MPC · JPL
540830	2017 XW_{16}	—	September 3, 2008	Kitt Peak	Spacewatch	·	1.2 km	MPC · JPL
540831	2017 XZ_{16}	—	September 27, 2006	Kitt Peak	Spacewatch	·	860 m	MPC · JPL
540832	2017 XC_{17}	—	November 30, 2003	Kitt Peak	Spacewatch	·	2.4 km	MPC · JPL
540833	2017 XL_{17}	—	December 25, 2013	Kitt Peak	Spacewatch	WIT	770 m	MPC · JPL
540834	2017 XN_{17}	—	April 23, 2015	Haleakala	Pan-STARRS 1	·	1.1 km	MPC · JPL
540835	2017 XO_{17}	—	July 25, 2011	Haleakala	Pan-STARRS 1	·	1.6 km	MPC · JPL
540836	2017 XU_{17}	—	December 11, 2004	Kitt Peak	Spacewatch	WIT	920 m	MPC · JPL
540837	2017 XD_{18}	—	January 26, 2006	Kitt Peak	Spacewatch	·	1.1 km	MPC · JPL
540838	2017 XJ_{18}	—	January 17, 2009	Kitt Peak	Spacewatch	KOR	1.3 km	MPC · JPL
540839	2017 XU_{18}	—	October 10, 2012	Mount Lemmon	Mount Lemmon Survey	·	2.1 km	MPC · JPL
540840	2017 XW_{18}	—	February 23, 2007	Kitt Peak	Spacewatch	NYS	940 m	MPC · JPL
540841	2017 XP_{19}	—	December 1, 2000	Kitt Peak	Spacewatch	HNS	1.1 km	MPC · JPL
540842	2017 XV_{19}	—	October 10, 2008	Mount Lemmon	Mount Lemmon Survey	·	1.7 km	MPC · JPL
540843	2017 XA_{20}	—	August 29, 2016	Mount Lemmon	Mount Lemmon Survey	EOS	1.9 km	MPC · JPL
540844	2017 XF_{20}	—	December 23, 2012	Haleakala	Pan-STARRS 1	HYG	2.0 km	MPC · JPL
540845	2017 XS_{20}	—	October 13, 2010	Mount Lemmon	Mount Lemmon Survey	·	800 m	MPC · JPL
540846	2017 XK_{21}	—	June 7, 2016	Haleakala	Pan-STARRS 1	EOS	1.7 km	MPC · JPL
540847	2017 XO_{21}	—	November 1, 2007	Kitt Peak	Spacewatch	·	1.8 km	MPC · JPL
540848	2017 XT_{21}	—	December 18, 2007	Mount Lemmon	Mount Lemmon Survey	·	2.2 km	MPC · JPL
540849	2017 XU_{21}	—	January 19, 2015	Mount Lemmon	Mount Lemmon Survey	·	1.3 km	MPC · JPL
540850	2017 XV_{21}	—	October 8, 2012	Mount Lemmon	Mount Lemmon Survey	615	1.1 km	MPC · JPL
540851	2017 XW_{21}	—	August 22, 2003	Campo Imperatore	CINEOS	·	1.7 km	MPC · JPL
540852	2017 XR_{22}	—	September 29, 2000	Kitt Peak	Spacewatch	·	3.1 km	MPC · JPL
540853	2017 XX_{22}	—	April 8, 2006	Kitt Peak	Spacewatch	·	2.2 km	MPC · JPL
540854	2017 XD_{23}	—	April 16, 2012	Haleakala	Pan-STARRS 1	·	1.0 km	MPC · JPL
540855	2017 XG_{23}	—	September 16, 2009	Mount Lemmon	Mount Lemmon Survey	·	1.3 km	MPC · JPL
540856	2017 XL_{23}	—	September 5, 2010	Mount Lemmon	Mount Lemmon Survey	·	820 m	MPC · JPL
540857	2017 XQ_{23}	—	August 27, 2006	Kitt Peak	Spacewatch	·	1.7 km	MPC · JPL
540858	2017 XB_{24}	—	September 23, 2008	Kitt Peak	Spacewatch	·	1.2 km	MPC · JPL
540859	2017 XO_{24}	—	November 19, 2008	Kitt Peak	Spacewatch	·	2.0 km	MPC · JPL
540860	2017 XT_{24}	—	September 9, 2007	Kitt Peak	Spacewatch	·	1.6 km	MPC · JPL
540861	2017 XW_{24}	—	March 1, 2008	Kitt Peak	Spacewatch	·	1.2 km	MPC · JPL
540862	2017 XK_{25}	—	October 30, 2007	Kitt Peak	Spacewatch	·	1.9 km	MPC · JPL
540863	2017 XY_{25}	—	September 30, 2006	Mount Lemmon	Mount Lemmon Survey	·	2.9 km	MPC · JPL
540864	2017 XA_{26}	—	November 11, 2013	Mount Lemmon	Mount Lemmon Survey	·	1.6 km	MPC · JPL
540865	2017 XG_{26}	—	September 10, 2007	Mount Lemmon	Mount Lemmon Survey	·	1.7 km	MPC · JPL
540866	2017 XP_{26}	—	September 30, 2003	Kitt Peak	Spacewatch	·	1.9 km	MPC · JPL
540867	2017 XS_{26}	—	September 27, 2011	Mount Lemmon	Mount Lemmon Survey	·	2.8 km	MPC · JPL
540868	2017 XU_{26}	—	November 6, 2008	Mount Lemmon	Mount Lemmon Survey	HOF	2.2 km	MPC · JPL
540869	2017 XY_{26}	—	November 10, 2010	Mount Lemmon	Mount Lemmon Survey	·	680 m	MPC · JPL
540870	2017 XH_{27}	—	February 26, 2014	Haleakala	Pan-STARRS 1	·	1.5 km	MPC · JPL
540871	2017 XN_{27}	—	April 1, 2014	Mount Lemmon	Mount Lemmon Survey	·	2.4 km	MPC · JPL
540872	2017 XF_{28}	—	September 26, 2008	Kitt Peak	Spacewatch	·	1.5 km	MPC · JPL
540873	2017 XP_{28}	—	January 28, 2014	Mount Lemmon	Mount Lemmon Survey	·	2.3 km	MPC · JPL
540874	2017 XQ_{28}	—	December 18, 2007	Kitt Peak	Spacewatch	EOS	1.5 km	MPC · JPL
540875	2017 XS_{28}	—	April 10, 2015	Kitt Peak	Spacewatch	·	3.0 km	MPC · JPL
540876	2017 XV_{28}	—	February 9, 2008	Kitt Peak	Spacewatch	·	2.0 km	MPC · JPL
540877	2017 XY_{28}	—	October 17, 2012	Mount Lemmon	Mount Lemmon Survey	·	1.8 km	MPC · JPL
540878	2017 XE_{29}	—	November 4, 2012	Mount Lemmon	Mount Lemmon Survey	KOR	1.1 km	MPC · JPL
540879	2017 XK_{29}	—	November 9, 1999	Kitt Peak	Spacewatch	·	670 m	MPC · JPL
540880	2017 XM_{29}	—	November 19, 2006	Kitt Peak	Spacewatch	·	1 km	MPC · JPL
540881	2017 XN_{29}	—	August 27, 2006	Kitt Peak	Spacewatch	·	1.8 km	MPC · JPL
540882	2017 XW_{29}	—	October 18, 2007	Mount Lemmon	Mount Lemmon Survey	KOR	1.1 km	MPC · JPL
540883	2017 XX_{29}	—	March 5, 2002	Kitt Peak	Spacewatch	·	1.1 km	MPC · JPL
540884	2017 XA_{30}	—	April 14, 2007	Mount Lemmon	Mount Lemmon Survey	·	840 m	MPC · JPL
540885	2017 XB_{30}	—	November 16, 2009	Mount Lemmon	Mount Lemmon Survey	·	1.2 km	MPC · JPL
540886	2017 XF_{30}	—	March 2, 2009	Mount Lemmon	Mount Lemmon Survey	·	3.2 km	MPC · JPL
540887	2017 XR_{30}	—	September 4, 1999	Kitt Peak	Spacewatch	·	860 m	MPC · JPL
540888	2017 XY_{30}	—	April 14, 2008	Kitt Peak	Spacewatch	·	990 m	MPC · JPL
540889	2017 XA_{31}	—	March 16, 2010	Mount Lemmon	Mount Lemmon Survey	HOF	3.1 km	MPC · JPL
540890	2017 XD_{31}	—	December 3, 2012	Mount Lemmon	Mount Lemmon Survey	·	1.7 km	MPC · JPL
540891	2017 XL_{31}	—	March 17, 2012	Kitt Peak	Spacewatch	·	1.1 km	MPC · JPL
540892	2017 XU_{31}	—	November 4, 2012	Mount Lemmon	Mount Lemmon Survey	·	1.5 km	MPC · JPL
540893	2017 XZ_{31}	—	February 22, 2001	Kitt Peak	Spacewatch	·	1.2 km	MPC · JPL
540894	2017 XA_{32}	—	November 26, 2012	Mount Lemmon	Mount Lemmon Survey	·	1.5 km	MPC · JPL
540895	2017 XC_{32}	—	February 13, 2013	Haleakala	Pan-STARRS 1	CYB	2.8 km	MPC · JPL
540896	2017 XF_{32}	—	November 22, 2008	Kitt Peak	Spacewatch	AGN	1.0 km	MPC · JPL
540897	2017 XJ_{32}	—	October 22, 2012	Haleakala	Pan-STARRS 1	·	1.5 km	MPC · JPL
540898	2017 XL_{32}	—	October 21, 2008	Mount Lemmon	Mount Lemmon Survey	ADE	1.9 km	MPC · JPL
540899	2017 XT_{32}	—	September 14, 2005	Kitt Peak	Spacewatch	·	4.4 km	MPC · JPL
540900	2017 XX_{32}	—	January 13, 2008	Kitt Peak	Spacewatch	HYG	2.8 km	MPC · JPL

== 540901–541000 ==
back to top

Designation			Discovery			Properties		Ref
Permanent	Provisional	Named after	Date	Site	Discoverer(s)	Category	Diam.	Ref
540901	2017 XU_{33}	—	February 10, 2008	Kitt Peak	Spacewatch	·	2.5 km	MPC · JPL
540902	2017 XZ_{33}	—	September 30, 2011	Kitt Peak	Spacewatch	·	2.8 km	MPC · JPL
540903	2017 XK_{34}	—	February 10, 2008	Kitt Peak	Spacewatch	·	2.4 km	MPC · JPL
540904	2017 XM_{34}	—	January 18, 2009	Kitt Peak	Spacewatch	KOR	1.5 km	MPC · JPL
540905	2017 XV_{34}	—	March 4, 2008	Mount Lemmon	Mount Lemmon Survey	·	1.4 km	MPC · JPL
540906	2017 XZ_{34}	—	January 31, 2009	Mount Lemmon	Mount Lemmon Survey	·	600 m	MPC · JPL
540907	2017 XD_{35}	—	November 19, 2008	Kitt Peak	Spacewatch	·	1.6 km	MPC · JPL
540908	2017 XK_{35}	—	December 3, 2012	Mount Lemmon	Mount Lemmon Survey	·	2.0 km	MPC · JPL
540909	2017 XL_{35}	—	May 20, 2014	Haleakala	Pan-STARRS 1	·	2.2 km	MPC · JPL
540910	2017 XU_{35}	—	September 27, 2006	Kitt Peak	Spacewatch	·	2.3 km	MPC · JPL
540911	2017 XE_{36}	—	September 12, 2007	Mount Lemmon	Mount Lemmon Survey	AGN	1.1 km	MPC · JPL
540912	2017 XU_{36}	—	October 11, 2004	Kitt Peak	Spacewatch	·	1.5 km	MPC · JPL
540913	2017 XY_{36}	—	March 13, 2002	Kitt Peak	Spacewatch	·	2.5 km	MPC · JPL
540914	2017 XG_{37}	—	September 4, 2008	Kitt Peak	Spacewatch	·	1.4 km	MPC · JPL
540915	2017 XH_{37}	—	February 1, 2009	Kitt Peak	Spacewatch	·	1.5 km	MPC · JPL
540916	2017 XU_{37}	—	November 27, 2009	Kitt Peak	Spacewatch	·	1.3 km	MPC · JPL
540917	2017 XF_{38}	—	May 15, 2005	Mount Lemmon	Mount Lemmon Survey	EOS	1.8 km	MPC · JPL
540918	2017 XH_{38}	—	January 4, 2012	Mount Lemmon	Mount Lemmon Survey	·	840 m	MPC · JPL
540919	2017 XJ_{38}	—	March 28, 2012	Mount Lemmon	Mount Lemmon Survey	·	570 m	MPC · JPL
540920	2017 XO_{38}	—	October 22, 2008	Kitt Peak	Spacewatch	·	1.6 km	MPC · JPL
540921	2017 XP_{38}	—	September 15, 2012	Mount Lemmon	Mount Lemmon Survey	HOF	2.1 km	MPC · JPL
540922	2017 XS_{38}	—	December 22, 2012	Haleakala	Pan-STARRS 1	VER	2.2 km	MPC · JPL
540923	2017 XV_{38}	—	December 14, 2001	Socorro	LINEAR	EOS	2.2 km	MPC · JPL
540924	2017 XA_{39}	—	April 20, 2006	Kitt Peak	Spacewatch	·	1.7 km	MPC · JPL
540925	2017 XE_{39}	—	August 29, 2016	Mount Lemmon	Mount Lemmon Survey	VER	2.9 km	MPC · JPL
540926	2017 XF_{39}	—	December 2, 2005	Kitt Peak	Spacewatch	·	1.4 km	MPC · JPL
540927	2017 XS_{39}	—	December 27, 2013	Mount Lemmon	Mount Lemmon Survey	·	2.0 km	MPC · JPL
540928	2017 XC_{40}	—	October 27, 2008	Kitt Peak	Spacewatch	·	1.6 km	MPC · JPL
540929	2017 XE_{40}	—	July 30, 2008	Siding Spring	SSS	·	1.9 km	MPC · JPL
540930	2017 XN_{40}	—	February 12, 2004	Kitt Peak	Spacewatch	3:2	5.2 km	MPC · JPL
540931	2017 XO_{40}	—	September 24, 2008	Catalina	CSS	·	1.9 km	MPC · JPL
540932	2017 XT_{40}	—	April 4, 2014	Haleakala	Pan-STARRS 1	·	2.9 km	MPC · JPL
540933	2017 XZ_{40}	—	November 28, 2013	Mount Lemmon	Mount Lemmon Survey	·	1.1 km	MPC · JPL
540934	2017 XF_{41}	—	November 19, 2008	Kitt Peak	Spacewatch	·	1.4 km	MPC · JPL
540935	2017 XK_{41}	—	July 19, 2010	WISE	WISE	CYB	3.4 km	MPC · JPL
540936	2017 XL_{41}	—	January 5, 2013	Mount Lemmon	Mount Lemmon Survey	·	2.4 km	MPC · JPL
540937	2017 XB_{42}	—	December 10, 2013	Mount Lemmon	Mount Lemmon Survey	·	850 m	MPC · JPL
540938	2017 XT_{42}	—	November 26, 2005	Mount Lemmon	Mount Lemmon Survey	·	1.2 km	MPC · JPL
540939	2017 XW_{42}	—	May 8, 2013	Haleakala	Pan-STARRS 1	·	2.3 km	MPC · JPL
540940	2017 XA_{43}	—	October 15, 2012	Haleakala	Pan-STARRS 1	AGN	1.1 km	MPC · JPL
540941	2017 XG_{43}	—	May 24, 2015	Haleakala	Pan-STARRS 1	·	1.3 km	MPC · JPL
540942	2017 XN_{43}	—	May 18, 2009	Mount Lemmon	Mount Lemmon Survey	·	3.1 km	MPC · JPL
540943	2017 XR_{43}	—	September 22, 2003	Kitt Peak	Spacewatch	·	1.7 km	MPC · JPL
540944	2017 XT_{43}	—	December 1, 2003	Kitt Peak	Spacewatch	·	1.6 km	MPC · JPL
540945	2017 XU_{43}	—	February 7, 2006	Mount Lemmon	Mount Lemmon Survey	·	1.0 km	MPC · JPL
540946	2017 XX_{43}	—	September 24, 2011	Haleakala	Pan-STARRS 1	·	2.5 km	MPC · JPL
540947	2017 XA_{44}	—	August 28, 2005	Kitt Peak	Spacewatch	·	2.9 km	MPC · JPL
540948	2017 XM_{44}	—	April 26, 2006	Kitt Peak	Spacewatch	·	1.7 km	MPC · JPL
540949	2017 XS_{44}	—	November 2, 2013	Mount Lemmon	Mount Lemmon Survey	·	1.1 km	MPC · JPL
540950	2017 XW_{44}	—	December 23, 2012	Haleakala	Pan-STARRS 1	·	2.2 km	MPC · JPL
540951	2017 XB_{45}	—	February 26, 2014	Haleakala	Pan-STARRS 1	·	2.0 km	MPC · JPL
540952	2017 XD_{45}	—	July 14, 2016	Haleakala	Pan-STARRS 1	(7744)	1.2 km	MPC · JPL
540953	2017 XK_{45}	—	November 10, 2004	Kitt Peak	Spacewatch	·	1.6 km	MPC · JPL
540954	2017 XW_{45}	—	January 26, 2014	Haleakala	Pan-STARRS 1	EOS	1.9 km	MPC · JPL
540955	2017 XZ_{45}	—	June 10, 2005	Kitt Peak	Spacewatch	·	1.2 km	MPC · JPL
540956	2017 XB_{46}	—	November 19, 2006	Kitt Peak	Spacewatch	·	2.6 km	MPC · JPL
540957	2017 XK_{46}	—	November 27, 2006	Mount Lemmon	Mount Lemmon Survey	HYG	2.4 km	MPC · JPL
540958	2017 XQ_{46}	—	March 10, 2014	Mount Lemmon	Mount Lemmon Survey	EOS	1.7 km	MPC · JPL
540959	2017 XU_{46}	—	May 9, 2011	Mount Lemmon	Mount Lemmon Survey	(29841)	1.3 km	MPC · JPL
540960	2017 XV_{46}	—	March 12, 2014	Mount Lemmon	Mount Lemmon Survey	·	2.4 km	MPC · JPL
540961	2017 XX_{46}	—	October 23, 2006	Mount Lemmon	Mount Lemmon Survey	·	3.4 km	MPC · JPL
540962	2017 XE_{47}	—	April 27, 2011	Haleakala	Pan-STARRS 1	·	1.7 km	MPC · JPL
540963	2017 XJ_{47}	—	October 16, 2012	Mount Lemmon	Mount Lemmon Survey	AGN	960 m	MPC · JPL
540964	2017 XK_{47}	—	September 14, 2013	Haleakala	Pan-STARRS 1	·	740 m	MPC · JPL
540965	2017 XX_{47}	—	October 28, 2008	Mount Lemmon	Mount Lemmon Survey	·	1.6 km	MPC · JPL
540966	2017 XL_{48}	—	May 21, 2014	Haleakala	Pan-STARRS 1	·	2.5 km	MPC · JPL
540967	2017 XO_{48}	—	November 27, 2013	Haleakala	Pan-STARRS 1	·	860 m	MPC · JPL
540968	2017 XT_{48}	—	December 31, 2007	Kitt Peak	Spacewatch	·	550 m	MPC · JPL
540969	2017 XU_{48}	—	August 3, 2016	Haleakala	Pan-STARRS 1	KOR	1.2 km	MPC · JPL
540970	2017 XZ_{48}	—	September 10, 2007	Mount Lemmon	Mount Lemmon Survey	KOR	1.0 km	MPC · JPL
540971	2017 XD_{49}	—	May 30, 2011	Haleakala	Pan-STARRS 1	·	2.3 km	MPC · JPL
540972	2017 XJ_{49}	—	February 1, 2006	Kitt Peak	Spacewatch	·	1.1 km	MPC · JPL
540973	2017 XR_{49}	—	February 10, 2011	Mount Lemmon	Mount Lemmon Survey	MAS	600 m	MPC · JPL
540974	2017 XS_{49}	—	November 9, 2007	Kitt Peak	Spacewatch	·	780 m	MPC · JPL
540975	2017 XB_{50}	—	August 24, 2008	Kitt Peak	Spacewatch	·	1.3 km	MPC · JPL
540976	2017 XF_{50}	—	November 17, 1995	Kitt Peak	Spacewatch	WIT	1.0 km	MPC · JPL
540977	2017 XR_{50}	—	November 1, 2013	Mount Lemmon	Mount Lemmon Survey	·	1.7 km	MPC · JPL
540978	2017 XU_{50}	—	August 30, 2003	Kitt Peak	Spacewatch	·	1.6 km	MPC · JPL
540979	2017 XD_{51}	—	November 21, 2009	Kitt Peak	Spacewatch	(5)	1.1 km	MPC · JPL
540980	2017 XG_{51}	—	October 15, 2007	Kitt Peak	Spacewatch	KOR	1.3 km	MPC · JPL
540981	2017 XJ_{51}	—	September 1, 2005	Kitt Peak	Spacewatch	·	920 m	MPC · JPL
540982	2017 XX_{51}	—	June 29, 2016	Haleakala	Pan-STARRS 1	EOS	1.8 km	MPC · JPL
540983	2017 XJ_{52}	—	September 15, 2006	Kitt Peak	Spacewatch	·	1.9 km	MPC · JPL
540984	2017 XN_{52}	—	November 5, 1999	Kitt Peak	Spacewatch	·	2.3 km	MPC · JPL
540985	2017 XZ_{52}	—	August 31, 2005	Kitt Peak	Spacewatch	·	1.4 km	MPC · JPL
540986	2017 XX_{53}	—	November 12, 2001	Kitt Peak	Spacewatch	·	750 m	MPC · JPL
540987	2017 XC_{54}	—	November 23, 2012	Kitt Peak	Spacewatch	·	1.6 km	MPC · JPL
540988	2017 XE_{54}	—	March 24, 2014	Haleakala	Pan-STARRS 1	EMA	2.3 km	MPC · JPL
540989	2017 XQ_{54}	—	October 31, 2006	Mount Lemmon	Mount Lemmon Survey	EOS	1.9 km	MPC · JPL
540990	2017 XW_{54}	—	August 9, 2004	Anderson Mesa	LONEOS	·	1.2 km	MPC · JPL
540991	2017 XK_{55}	—	September 26, 2006	Kitt Peak	Spacewatch	·	1.7 km	MPC · JPL
540992	2017 XN_{55}	—	December 31, 2013	Mount Lemmon	Mount Lemmon Survey	·	1.3 km	MPC · JPL
540993	2017 XM_{56}	—	May 4, 2009	Mount Lemmon	Mount Lemmon Survey	·	2.7 km	MPC · JPL
540994	2017 XS_{56}	—	November 10, 2005	Kitt Peak	Spacewatch	·	1.1 km	MPC · JPL
540995	2017 XT_{56}	—	January 22, 2015	Haleakala	Pan-STARRS 1	·	860 m	MPC · JPL
540996	2017 XW_{56}	—	June 2, 2011	Haleakala	Pan-STARRS 1	·	1.6 km	MPC · JPL
540997	2017 XH_{57}	—	December 22, 2008	Kitt Peak	Spacewatch	KOR	1.3 km	MPC · JPL
540998	2017 XN_{57}	—	July 10, 2005	Kitt Peak	Spacewatch	·	1 km	MPC · JPL
540999	2017 XO_{57}	—	January 23, 2015	Haleakala	Pan-STARRS 1	·	830 m	MPC · JPL
541000	2017 XP_{57}	—	April 23, 2010	WISE	WISE	·	2.7 km	MPC · JPL

back to top

== Meaning of names ==
As minor planet discoveries are confirmed, they are given a permanent number by the IAU's Minor Planet Center (MPC), and the discoverers can then submit names for them, following the IAU's naming conventions. The list below concerns those minor planets in the specified number-range that have received names, and explains the meanings of those names.

Official naming citations of newly named small Solar System bodies are approved and published in a bulletin by IAU's Working Group for Small Bodies Nomenclature (WGSBN). Before May 2021, citations were published in MPC's Minor Planet Circulars for many decades. Recent citations can also be found on the JPL Small-Body Database (SBDB). Until his death in 2016, German astronomer Lutz D. Schmadel compiled these citations into the Dictionary of Minor Planet Names (DMP) and regularly updated the collection.

Based on Paul Herget's The Names of the Minor Planets, Schmadel also researched the unclear origin of numerous asteroids, most of which had been named prior to World War II. This article incorporates text from this source, which is in the public domain: SBDB New namings may only be added to this list below after official publication as the preannouncement of names is condemned. The WGSBN publishes a comprehensive guideline for the naming rules of non-cometary small Solar System bodies.

Named minor planet	Provisional	This minor planet was named for...	Ref · Catalog
540413 Nikzad	2017 SU_{55}	Shouleh Nikzad (b. 1961), an Iranian-American electronics engineer and research scientist at the Jet Propulsion Laboratory.	IAU · 540413
