= List of minor planets: 520001–521000 =

The following is a partial list of minor planets, running from minor-planet number 520001 through 521000, inclusive. The primary data for this and other partial lists is based on JPL's "Small-Body Orbital Elements" and data available from the Minor Planet Center. Critical list information is also provided by the MPC, unless otherwise specified from Lowell Observatory. A detailed description of the table's columns and additional sources are given on the main page including a complete list of every page in this series, and a statistical break-up on the dynamical classification of minor planets.

Also see the summary list of all named bodies in numerical and alphabetical order, and the corresponding naming citations for the number range of this particular list. New namings may only be added to this list after official publication, as the preannouncement of names is condemned by the Working Group for Small Bodies Nomenclature of the International Astronomical Union.

Near-Earth obj.	MBA (inner)	MBA (outer)	Centaur
Mars-crosser	MBA (middle)	Jupiter trojan	Trans-Neptunian obj.
Unclassified

== 520001–520100 ==
Designation			Discovery			Properties		Ref
Permanent	Provisional	Named after	Date	Site	Discoverer(s)	Category	Diam.	Ref
520001	2013 TH_{170}	—	December 2, 2008	Mount Lemmon	Mount Lemmon Survey	·	2.4 km	MPC · JPL
520002	2013 TM_{170}	—	October 2, 2013	Kitt Peak	Spacewatch	·	1.8 km	MPC · JPL
520003	2013 TN_{170}	—	October 2, 2013	Kitt Peak	Spacewatch	·	1.2 km	MPC · JPL
520004	2013 TP_{170}	—	September 12, 2013	Mount Lemmon	Mount Lemmon Survey	THM	2.1 km	MPC · JPL
520005	2013 TU_{170}	—	April 14, 2011	Mount Lemmon	Mount Lemmon Survey	·	1.6 km	MPC · JPL
520006	2013 TZ_{170}	—	October 7, 2008	Kitt Peak	Spacewatch	AGN	950 m	MPC · JPL
520007	2013 TC_{171}	—	October 23, 2004	Kitt Peak	Spacewatch	·	1.9 km	MPC · JPL
520008	2013 UQ_{19}	—	October 23, 2013	Mount Lemmon	Mount Lemmon Survey	AGN	970 m	MPC · JPL
520009	2013 UU_{19}	—	October 24, 2013	Mount Lemmon	Mount Lemmon Survey	·	1.2 km	MPC · JPL
520010	2013 UV_{19}	—	December 18, 2009	Kitt Peak	Spacewatch	·	1.3 km	MPC · JPL
520011	2013 UH_{20}	—	November 2, 2000	Kitt Peak	Spacewatch	·	1.0 km	MPC · JPL
520012	2013 UN_{20}	—	October 9, 2013	Mount Lemmon	Mount Lemmon Survey	·	1.3 km	MPC · JPL
520013	2013 UQ_{20}	—	September 28, 2003	Kitt Peak	Spacewatch	KOR	1.2 km	MPC · JPL
520014	2013 UT_{20}	—	October 25, 2013	Kitt Peak	Spacewatch	·	1.1 km	MPC · JPL
520015	2013 UY_{20}	—	October 26, 2013	Catalina	CSS	·	2.1 km	MPC · JPL
520016	2013 UZ_{20}	—	October 26, 2013	Kitt Peak	Spacewatch	·	1.2 km	MPC · JPL
520017	2013 UB_{21}	—	November 22, 2009	Kitt Peak	Spacewatch	(5)	980 m	MPC · JPL
520018	2013 UE_{21}	—	January 7, 2006	Kitt Peak	Spacewatch	·	1.4 km	MPC · JPL
520019	2013 UH_{21}	—	September 5, 2008	Kitt Peak	Spacewatch	·	1.6 km	MPC · JPL
520020	2013 UL_{21}	—	October 26, 2013	Kitt Peak	Spacewatch	·	1.4 km	MPC · JPL
520021	2013 UO_{21}	—	November 1, 2008	Mount Lemmon	Mount Lemmon Survey	KOR	1.4 km	MPC · JPL
520022	2013 UP_{21}	—	November 4, 2004	Kitt Peak	Spacewatch	·	1.6 km	MPC · JPL
520023	2013 UA_{22}	—	November 9, 2009	Mount Lemmon	Mount Lemmon Survey	HNS	1.0 km	MPC · JPL
520024	2013 UB_{22}	—	October 31, 2013	Kitt Peak	Spacewatch	·	1.5 km	MPC · JPL
520025	2013 UD_{22}	—	April 19, 2007	Kitt Peak	Spacewatch	(194)	1.3 km	MPC · JPL
520026	2013 VB_{27}	—	November 1, 2013	Mount Lemmon	Mount Lemmon Survey	NEM	1.9 km	MPC · JPL
520027	2013 VG_{27}	—	November 1, 2013	Kitt Peak	Spacewatch	·	3.6 km	MPC · JPL
520028	2013 VJ_{27}	—	November 1, 2013	Mount Lemmon	Mount Lemmon Survey	·	1.8 km	MPC · JPL
520029	2013 VU_{27}	—	November 2, 2013	Kitt Peak	Spacewatch	·	1.2 km	MPC · JPL
520030	2013 VY_{27}	—	November 21, 2009	Kitt Peak	Spacewatch	·	1.9 km	MPC · JPL
520031	2013 VZ_{27}	—	September 9, 2007	Kitt Peak	Spacewatch	·	2.5 km	MPC · JPL
520032	2013 VE_{28}	—	November 2, 2013	Kitt Peak	Spacewatch	·	1.6 km	MPC · JPL
520033	2013 VF_{28}	—	November 2, 2013	Mount Lemmon	Mount Lemmon Survey	·	2.3 km	MPC · JPL
520034	2013 VG_{28}	—	November 2, 2013	Mount Lemmon	Mount Lemmon Survey	·	1.6 km	MPC · JPL
520035	2013 VJ_{28}	—	September 3, 2008	Kitt Peak	Spacewatch	·	1.4 km	MPC · JPL
520036	2013 VK_{28}	—	November 2, 2013	Mount Lemmon	Mount Lemmon Survey	·	1.6 km	MPC · JPL
520037	2013 VP_{28}	—	November 6, 2013	Haleakala	Pan-STARRS 1	·	1.3 km	MPC · JPL
520038	2013 VT_{28}	—	August 22, 2004	Kitt Peak	Spacewatch	·	1.1 km	MPC · JPL
520039	2013 VU_{28}	—	October 25, 2005	Kitt Peak	Spacewatch	·	1.6 km	MPC · JPL
520040	2013 VW_{28}	—	September 7, 2004	Kitt Peak	Spacewatch	·	1.2 km	MPC · JPL
520041	2013 VA_{29}	—	October 14, 2013	Mount Lemmon	Mount Lemmon Survey	EOS	1.7 km	MPC · JPL
520042	2013 VE_{29}	—	December 21, 2008	Catalina	CSS	·	2.2 km	MPC · JPL
520043	2013 VJ_{29}	—	November 9, 2013	Haleakala	Pan-STARRS 1	MAR	1 km	MPC · JPL
520044	2013 VL_{29}	—	September 11, 2007	XuYi	PMO NEO Survey Program	·	2.2 km	MPC · JPL
520045	2013 VN_{29}	—	September 3, 2008	Kitt Peak	Spacewatch	·	1.5 km	MPC · JPL
520046	2013 VP_{29}	—	May 2, 2010	WISE	WISE	DOR	2.0 km	MPC · JPL
520047	2013 VV_{29}	—	November 9, 2013	Haleakala	Pan-STARRS 1	·	1.4 km	MPC · JPL
520048	2013 VW_{29}	—	November 21, 2008	Kitt Peak	Spacewatch	·	2.1 km	MPC · JPL
520049	2013 VY_{29}	—	November 10, 2013	Kitt Peak	Spacewatch	·	1.1 km	MPC · JPL
520050	2013 VZ_{29}	—	November 10, 2013	Kitt Peak	Spacewatch	·	1.3 km	MPC · JPL
520051	2013 VA_{30}	—	November 9, 2004	Catalina	CSS	EUN	1.2 km	MPC · JPL
520052	2013 VE_{30}	—	October 7, 2013	Kitt Peak	Spacewatch	AGN	1.2 km	MPC · JPL
520053	2013 VF_{30}	—	September 26, 2008	Mount Lemmon	Mount Lemmon Survey	·	1.6 km	MPC · JPL
520054	2013 VK_{30}	—	November 6, 2013	Catalina	CSS	·	1.3 km	MPC · JPL
520055	2013 VO_{30}	—	September 22, 2008	Mount Lemmon	Mount Lemmon Survey	·	1.7 km	MPC · JPL
520056	2013 VQ_{30}	—	November 12, 2013	Mount Lemmon	Mount Lemmon Survey	·	1.2 km	MPC · JPL
520057	2013 VR_{30}	—	August 10, 2012	Kitt Peak	Spacewatch	EOS	2.1 km	MPC · JPL
520058	2013 VT_{30}	—	October 1, 2008	Kitt Peak	Spacewatch	·	1.7 km	MPC · JPL
520059	2013 WR_{111}	—	November 26, 2013	Mount Lemmon	Mount Lemmon Survey	WIT	920 m	MPC · JPL
520060	2013 WS_{111}	—	November 26, 2013	Mount Lemmon	Mount Lemmon Survey	EOS	2.0 km	MPC · JPL
520061	2013 WU_{111}	—	November 26, 2013	Haleakala	Pan-STARRS 1	·	3.0 km	MPC · JPL
520062	2013 WX_{111}	—	February 13, 2004	Kitt Peak	Spacewatch	·	2.2 km	MPC · JPL
520063	2013 WY_{111}	—	January 7, 2010	Kitt Peak	Spacewatch	·	1.2 km	MPC · JPL
520064	2013 WZ_{111}	—	November 27, 2013	Haleakala	Pan-STARRS 1	·	2.0 km	MPC · JPL
520065	2013 WB_{112}	—	April 25, 2010	WISE	WISE	·	2.2 km	MPC · JPL
520066	2013 WH_{112}	—	November 27, 2013	Haleakala	Pan-STARRS 1	·	2.3 km	MPC · JPL
520067	2013 WP_{112}	—	November 28, 2013	Mount Lemmon	Mount Lemmon Survey	·	680 m	MPC · JPL
520068	2013 WQ_{112}	—	September 22, 2008	Kitt Peak	Spacewatch	·	1.8 km	MPC · JPL
520069	2013 WU_{112}	—	November 18, 2008	Kitt Peak	Spacewatch	·	1.5 km	MPC · JPL
520070	2013 WX_{112}	—	November 28, 2013	Kitt Peak	Spacewatch	·	1.6 km	MPC · JPL
520071	2013 WY_{112}	—	March 29, 2011	Mount Lemmon	Mount Lemmon Survey	·	1.2 km	MPC · JPL
520072	2013 WA_{113}	—	September 30, 2008	Catalina	CSS	·	2.2 km	MPC · JPL
520073	2013 WC_{113}	—	September 4, 2008	Kitt Peak	Spacewatch	·	1.3 km	MPC · JPL
520074	2013 WK_{113}	—	February 15, 2010	Kitt Peak	Spacewatch	BRA	1.6 km	MPC · JPL
520075	2013 WL_{113}	—	November 29, 2013	Haleakala	Pan-STARRS 1	·	2.0 km	MPC · JPL
520076	2013 WM_{113}	—	April 12, 2011	Mount Lemmon	Mount Lemmon Survey	·	2.1 km	MPC · JPL
520077	2013 WO_{113}	—	April 28, 2011	Mount Lemmon	Mount Lemmon Survey	·	1.6 km	MPC · JPL
520078	2013 WP_{113}	—	November 21, 2008	Kitt Peak	Spacewatch	·	1.6 km	MPC · JPL
520079	2013 XD_{27}	—	December 4, 2013	Haleakala	Pan-STARRS 1	·	3.0 km	MPC · JPL
520080	2013 XE_{27}	—	August 26, 2012	Haleakala	Pan-STARRS 1	·	1.6 km	MPC · JPL
520081	2013 XG_{27}	—	December 6, 2013	Haleakala	Pan-STARRS 1	·	2.1 km	MPC · JPL
520082	2013 XL_{27}	—	September 16, 2012	Kitt Peak	Spacewatch	EOS	2.0 km	MPC · JPL
520083	2013 XN_{27}	—	November 10, 2013	Mount Lemmon	Mount Lemmon Survey	·	1.9 km	MPC · JPL
520084	2013 XR_{27}	—	April 30, 2006	Kitt Peak	Spacewatch	·	1.8 km	MPC · JPL
520085	2013 XS_{27}	—	December 11, 2013	Mount Lemmon	Mount Lemmon Survey	MAR	1.0 km	MPC · JPL
520086	2013 XT_{27}	—	November 20, 2004	Kitt Peak	Spacewatch	·	1.5 km	MPC · JPL
520087	2013 XW_{27}	—	December 12, 2013	Haleakala	Pan-STARRS 1	·	1.7 km	MPC · JPL
520088	2013 XZ_{27}	—	December 14, 2013	Haleakala	Pan-STARRS 1	·	1.6 km	MPC · JPL
520089	2013 YJ_{88}	—	March 19, 2010	Kitt Peak	Spacewatch	·	2.1 km	MPC · JPL
520090	2013 YB_{104}	—	April 13, 2011	Haleakala	Pan-STARRS 1	·	2.0 km	MPC · JPL
520091	2013 YE_{146}	—	December 4, 2013	Haleakala	Pan-STARRS 1	·	1.1 km	MPC · JPL
520092	2013 YQ_{153}	—	January 8, 2010	Kitt Peak	Spacewatch	·	1.7 km	MPC · JPL
520093	2013 YR_{153}	—	December 29, 2008	Kitt Peak	Spacewatch	·	1.8 km	MPC · JPL
520094	2013 YS_{153}	—	October 10, 2008	Kitt Peak	Spacewatch	·	1.3 km	MPC · JPL
520095	2013 YU_{153}	—	December 25, 2013	Catalina	CSS	·	1.7 km	MPC · JPL
520096	2013 YW_{153}	—	December 25, 2013	Mount Lemmon	Mount Lemmon Survey	·	1.8 km	MPC · JPL
520097	2013 YA_{154}	—	December 25, 2013	Mount Lemmon	Mount Lemmon Survey	MRX	870 m	MPC · JPL
520098	2013 YD_{154}	—	December 26, 2013	Mount Lemmon	Mount Lemmon Survey	VER	2.3 km	MPC · JPL
520099	2013 YE_{154}	—	December 13, 2013	Mount Lemmon	Mount Lemmon Survey	·	2.0 km	MPC · JPL
520100	2013 YF_{154}	—	December 27, 2013	Mount Lemmon	Mount Lemmon Survey	VER	2.6 km	MPC · JPL

== 520101–520200 ==
back to top

Designation			Discovery			Properties		Ref
Permanent	Provisional	Named after	Date	Site	Discoverer(s)	Category	Diam.	Ref
520101	2013 YK_{154}	—	December 30, 2013	Mount Lemmon	Mount Lemmon Survey	·	2.7 km	MPC · JPL
520102	2013 YN_{154}	—	December 30, 2013	Mount Lemmon	Mount Lemmon Survey	·	1.2 km	MPC · JPL
520103	2013 YR_{154}	—	October 6, 2012	Haleakala	Pan-STARRS 1	·	3.0 km	MPC · JPL
520104	2013 YU_{154}	—	January 31, 2009	Kitt Peak	Spacewatch	·	2.3 km	MPC · JPL
520105	2013 YV_{154}	—	November 8, 2008	Mount Lemmon	Mount Lemmon Survey	·	1.7 km	MPC · JPL
520106	2014 AO_{9}	—	May 8, 2006	Kitt Peak	Spacewatch	·	1.9 km	MPC · JPL
520107	2014 AK_{22}	—	June 4, 2011	Mount Lemmon	Mount Lemmon Survey	·	2.6 km	MPC · JPL
520108	2014 AE_{42}	—	September 5, 2008	Kitt Peak	Spacewatch	·	1.3 km	MPC · JPL
520109	2014 AG_{43}	—	November 28, 2013	Mount Lemmon	Mount Lemmon Survey	·	1.5 km	MPC · JPL
520110	2014 AK_{47}	—	August 26, 2012	Haleakala	Pan-STARRS 1	·	1.8 km	MPC · JPL
520111	2014 AL_{58}	—	April 30, 2011	Mount Lemmon	Mount Lemmon Survey	·	880 m	MPC · JPL
520112	2014 AN_{58}	—	March 20, 2010	Mount Lemmon	Mount Lemmon Survey	·	1.7 km	MPC · JPL
520113	2014 AP_{58}	—	January 1, 2014	Haleakala	Pan-STARRS 1	·	1.4 km	MPC · JPL
520114	2014 AQ_{58}	—	August 28, 2011	Haleakala	Pan-STARRS 1	·	3.3 km	MPC · JPL
520115	2014 AY_{58}	—	January 2, 2014	Kitt Peak	Spacewatch	·	3.0 km	MPC · JPL
520116	2014 AZ_{58}	—	January 3, 2014	Mount Lemmon	Mount Lemmon Survey	VER	2.2 km	MPC · JPL
520117	2014 AB_{59}	—	December 28, 2007	Kitt Peak	Spacewatch	·	2.3 km	MPC · JPL
520118	2014 AE_{59}	—	June 25, 2010	WISE	WISE	·	3.0 km	MPC · JPL
520119	2014 AF_{59}	—	March 13, 2007	Kitt Peak	Spacewatch	MAS	570 m	MPC · JPL
520120	2014 AL_{59}	—	October 10, 2012	Mount Lemmon	Mount Lemmon Survey	·	1.7 km	MPC · JPL
520121	2014 AO_{59}	—	February 18, 2010	Kitt Peak	Spacewatch	·	1.1 km	MPC · JPL
520122	2014 AS_{59}	—	February 14, 2010	Kitt Peak	Spacewatch	·	1.6 km	MPC · JPL
520123	2014 AU_{59}	—	January 9, 2014	Haleakala	Pan-STARRS 1	·	1.2 km	MPC · JPL
520124	2014 AA_{60}	—	January 19, 2005	Kitt Peak	Spacewatch	·	1.5 km	MPC · JPL
520125	2014 AB_{60}	—	November 22, 2008	Kitt Peak	Spacewatch	·	1.4 km	MPC · JPL
520126	2014 AD_{60}	—	January 12, 2014	Mount Lemmon	Mount Lemmon Survey	·	1.4 km	MPC · JPL
520127	2014 BG_{39}	—	January 12, 2010	Mount Lemmon	Mount Lemmon Survey	·	1.7 km	MPC · JPL
520128	2014 BE_{66}	—	October 15, 2012	Kitt Peak	Spacewatch	THM	2.6 km	MPC · JPL
520129	2014 BF_{67}	—	April 7, 2003	Kitt Peak	Spacewatch	MAS	710 m	MPC · JPL
520130	2014 BL_{67}	—	January 9, 2014	Mount Lemmon	Mount Lemmon Survey	·	1.3 km	MPC · JPL
520131	2014 BN_{67}	—	November 3, 2007	Kitt Peak	Spacewatch	·	1.8 km	MPC · JPL
520132	2014 BR_{67}	—	January 24, 2014	Haleakala	Pan-STARRS 1	·	1.6 km	MPC · JPL
520133	2014 BT_{67}	—	January 24, 2014	Haleakala	Pan-STARRS 1	EUN	1.0 km	MPC · JPL
520134	2014 BV_{67}	—	October 10, 2012	Haleakala	Pan-STARRS 1	·	2.9 km	MPC · JPL
520135	2014 BX_{67}	—	November 24, 2009	Kitt Peak	Spacewatch	NYS	920 m	MPC · JPL
520136	2014 BZ_{67}	—	August 24, 2011	Haleakala	Pan-STARRS 1	EOS	1.7 km	MPC · JPL
520137	2014 BC_{68}	—	January 9, 2014	Mount Lemmon	Mount Lemmon Survey	·	1.5 km	MPC · JPL
520138	2014 BD_{68}	—	January 25, 2014	Haleakala	Pan-STARRS 1	·	2.2 km	MPC · JPL
520139	2014 BG_{68}	—	August 2, 2011	Haleakala	Pan-STARRS 1	·	3.3 km	MPC · JPL
520140	2014 BH_{68}	—	January 25, 2014	Haleakala	Pan-STARRS 1	·	1.3 km	MPC · JPL
520141	2014 BK_{68}	—	March 18, 2004	Kitt Peak	Spacewatch	EOS	2.1 km	MPC · JPL
520142	2014 BT_{68}	—	December 30, 2013	Mount Lemmon	Mount Lemmon Survey	·	1.1 km	MPC · JPL
520143	2014 BU_{68}	—	September 25, 2008	Kitt Peak	Spacewatch	·	1.2 km	MPC · JPL
520144	2014 BX_{68}	—	May 7, 2011	Kitt Peak	Spacewatch	·	1.5 km	MPC · JPL
520145	2014 BZ_{68}	—	October 10, 2012	Mount Lemmon	Mount Lemmon Survey	·	1.3 km	MPC · JPL
520146	2014 BC_{69}	—	January 28, 2014	Kitt Peak	Spacewatch	·	1.7 km	MPC · JPL
520147	2014 BL_{69}	—	September 13, 2007	Kitt Peak	Spacewatch	·	1.5 km	MPC · JPL
520148	2014 BM_{69}	—	January 30, 2014	Kitt Peak	Spacewatch	BRG	1.2 km	MPC · JPL
520149	2014 BN_{69}	—	January 30, 2014	Kitt Peak	Spacewatch	·	1.4 km	MPC · JPL
520150	2014 BO_{69}	—	October 19, 2012	Mount Lemmon	Mount Lemmon Survey	(18466)	2.3 km	MPC · JPL
520151	2014 BR_{69}	—	August 30, 2011	Haleakala	Pan-STARRS 1	·	2.0 km	MPC · JPL
520152	2014 BS_{69}	—	October 22, 2012	Kitt Peak	Spacewatch	EOS	1.8 km	MPC · JPL
520153	2014 CC_{25}	—	March 28, 2009	Siding Spring	SSS	·	3.5 km	MPC · JPL
520154	2014 CD_{25}	—	September 15, 2007	Mount Lemmon	Mount Lemmon Survey	·	1.6 km	MPC · JPL
520155	2014 CG_{25}	—	November 22, 2008	Kitt Peak	Spacewatch	·	2.2 km	MPC · JPL
520156	2014 CJ_{25}	—	October 27, 2008	Mount Lemmon	Mount Lemmon Survey	·	1.1 km	MPC · JPL
520157	2014 CM_{25}	—	April 9, 2010	Mount Lemmon	Mount Lemmon Survey	·	1.1 km	MPC · JPL
520158	2014 CP_{25}	—	March 13, 2005	Kitt Peak	Spacewatch	·	1.5 km	MPC · JPL
520159	2014 CR_{25}	—	January 29, 2014	Kitt Peak	Spacewatch	·	1.3 km	MPC · JPL
520160	2014 CS_{25}	—	September 30, 2006	Kitt Peak	Spacewatch	EOS	1.7 km	MPC · JPL
520161	2014 CV_{25}	—	February 9, 2014	Haleakala	Pan-STARRS 1	·	1.6 km	MPC · JPL
520162	2014 CY_{25}	—	April 2, 2009	Kitt Peak	Spacewatch	THM	2.0 km	MPC · JPL
520163	2014 CZ_{25}	—	August 27, 2011	Haleakala	Pan-STARRS 1	·	1.9 km	MPC · JPL
520164	2014 CA_{26}	—	October 14, 2012	Kitt Peak	Spacewatch	·	1.2 km	MPC · JPL
520165	2014 CH_{26}	—	February 10, 2014	Haleakala	Pan-STARRS 1	·	1.4 km	MPC · JPL
520166	2014 CJ_{26}	—	September 6, 2008	Kitt Peak	Spacewatch	·	950 m	MPC · JPL
520167	2014 CQ_{26}	—	December 19, 2007	Kitt Peak	Spacewatch	·	2.5 km	MPC · JPL
520168	2014 CW_{26}	—	October 13, 2012	Kitt Peak	Spacewatch	·	2.5 km	MPC · JPL
520169	2014 CC_{27}	—	December 31, 2008	Kitt Peak	Spacewatch	·	1.6 km	MPC · JPL
520170	2014 CE_{27}	—	October 1, 2011	Kitt Peak	Spacewatch	·	1.8 km	MPC · JPL
520171	2014 CF_{27}	—	January 6, 2013	Kitt Peak	Spacewatch	·	2.5 km	MPC · JPL
520172	2014 CK_{27}	—	September 25, 2007	Mount Lemmon	Mount Lemmon Survey	·	2.2 km	MPC · JPL
520173	2014 CM_{27}	—	February 11, 2014	Mount Lemmon	Mount Lemmon Survey	·	1.0 km	MPC · JPL
520174	2014 CN_{27}	—	September 11, 2007	XuYi	PMO NEO Survey Program	·	1.3 km	MPC · JPL
520175	2014 CP_{27}	—	February 11, 2014	Mount Lemmon	Mount Lemmon Survey	·	1.4 km	MPC · JPL
520176	2014 DT	—	March 14, 2007	Kitt Peak	Spacewatch	MAS	530 m	MPC · JPL
520177	2014 DT_{8}	—	November 8, 2008	Mount Lemmon	Mount Lemmon Survey	·	1.4 km	MPC · JPL
520178	2014 DJ_{9}	—	October 11, 2012	Haleakala	Pan-STARRS 1	·	970 m	MPC · JPL
520179	2014 DS_{29}	—	April 2, 2011	Mount Lemmon	Mount Lemmon Survey	·	830 m	MPC · JPL
520180	2014 DG_{36}	—	January 27, 2007	Mount Lemmon	Mount Lemmon Survey	·	720 m	MPC · JPL
520181	2014 DH_{53}	—	February 16, 2010	Mount Lemmon	Mount Lemmon Survey	MAS	650 m	MPC · JPL
520182	2014 DM_{59}	—	February 26, 2014	Haleakala	Pan-STARRS 1	·	1.0 km	MPC · JPL
520183	2014 DM_{68}	—	February 26, 2014	Haleakala	Pan-STARRS 1	·	1.1 km	MPC · JPL
520184	2014 DS_{71}	—	April 17, 1999	Kitt Peak	Spacewatch	·	1.1 km	MPC · JPL
520185	2014 DT_{74}	—	October 8, 2012	Haleakala	Pan-STARRS 1	·	1.2 km	MPC · JPL
520186	2014 DQ_{79}	—	April 25, 2003	Kitt Peak	Spacewatch	NYS	980 m	MPC · JPL
520187	2014 DC_{98}	—	April 7, 2010	WISE	WISE	·	990 m	MPC · JPL
520188	2014 DD_{108}	—	February 9, 2014	Haleakala	Pan-STARRS 1	NYS	1.0 km	MPC · JPL
520189	2014 DB_{118}	—	April 25, 2007	Kitt Peak	Spacewatch	·	1 km	MPC · JPL
520190	2014 DE_{123}	—	August 29, 2005	Kitt Peak	Spacewatch	·	3.0 km	MPC · JPL
520191	2014 DG_{149}	—	April 5, 2003	Kitt Peak	Spacewatch	·	1.1 km	MPC · JPL
520192	2014 DQ_{149}	—	February 28, 2014	Haleakala	Pan-STARRS 1	·	1.8 km	MPC · JPL
520193	2014 DR_{149}	—	December 23, 2012	Haleakala	Pan-STARRS 1	MAR	950 m	MPC · JPL
520194	2014 DT_{149}	—	March 26, 2009	Kitt Peak	Spacewatch	HYG	2.4 km	MPC · JPL
520195	2014 DW_{149}	—	December 30, 2013	Mount Lemmon	Mount Lemmon Survey	·	2.4 km	MPC · JPL
520196	2014 DY_{149}	—	September 18, 2011	Mount Lemmon	Mount Lemmon Survey	·	1.7 km	MPC · JPL
520197	2014 DZ_{149}	—	September 17, 2006	Kitt Peak	Spacewatch	·	3.2 km	MPC · JPL
520198	2014 DA_{150}	—	October 24, 2008	Kitt Peak	Spacewatch	·	1.2 km	MPC · JPL
520199	2014 DC_{150}	—	March 3, 2005	Kitt Peak	Spacewatch	·	1.6 km	MPC · JPL
520200	2014 DE_{150}	—	April 9, 2010	Mount Lemmon	Mount Lemmon Survey	·	1.5 km	MPC · JPL

== 520201–520300 ==
back to top

Designation			Discovery			Properties		Ref
Permanent	Provisional	Named after	Date	Site	Discoverer(s)	Category	Diam.	Ref
520201	2014 DG_{150}	—	November 12, 2012	Mount Lemmon	Mount Lemmon Survey	·	2.8 km	MPC · JPL
520202	2014 DK_{150}	—	February 24, 2014	Haleakala	Pan-STARRS 1	·	2.9 km	MPC · JPL
520203	2014 DN_{150}	—	December 17, 2009	Kitt Peak	Spacewatch	·	1.1 km	MPC · JPL
520204	2014 DS_{150}	—	March 19, 2009	Mount Lemmon	Mount Lemmon Survey	EOS	1.6 km	MPC · JPL
520205	2014 DX_{150}	—	February 9, 2008	Mount Lemmon	Mount Lemmon Survey	·	3.5 km	MPC · JPL
520206	2014 DY_{150}	—	February 26, 2014	Kitt Peak	Spacewatch	·	1.6 km	MPC · JPL
520207	2014 DB_{151}	—	September 6, 2008	Kitt Peak	Spacewatch	·	1.0 km	MPC · JPL
520208	2014 DE_{151}	—	January 23, 2014	Mount Lemmon	Mount Lemmon Survey	·	1.5 km	MPC · JPL
520209	2014 DM_{151}	—	August 27, 2006	Kitt Peak	Spacewatch	KOR	1.3 km	MPC · JPL
520210	2014 DQ_{151}	—	November 9, 2007	Kitt Peak	Spacewatch	·	1.5 km	MPC · JPL
520211	2014 DS_{151}	—	September 19, 2006	Kitt Peak	Spacewatch	KOR	1.4 km	MPC · JPL
520212	2014 DT_{151}	—	February 20, 2009	Kitt Peak	Spacewatch	AGN	1.2 km	MPC · JPL
520213	2014 DU_{151}	—	September 12, 2007	Mount Lemmon	Mount Lemmon Survey	·	1.5 km	MPC · JPL
520214	2014 DV_{151}	—	January 18, 2008	Mount Lemmon	Mount Lemmon Survey	·	2.4 km	MPC · JPL
520215	2014 DY_{151}	—	November 21, 2008	Kitt Peak	Spacewatch	·	1.1 km	MPC · JPL
520216	2014 DZ_{151}	—	December 31, 2008	Kitt Peak	Spacewatch	·	1.4 km	MPC · JPL
520217	2014 DA_{152}	—	April 21, 2009	Mount Lemmon	Mount Lemmon Survey	·	2.1 km	MPC · JPL
520218	2014 DC_{152}	—	February 26, 2014	Haleakala	Pan-STARRS 1	·	2.2 km	MPC · JPL
520219	2014 DE_{152}	—	March 17, 2009	Kitt Peak	Spacewatch	KOR	1.5 km	MPC · JPL
520220	2014 DH_{152}	—	April 14, 2010	Kitt Peak	Spacewatch	·	990 m	MPC · JPL
520221	2014 DO_{152}	—	September 26, 2006	Kitt Peak	Spacewatch	·	2.1 km	MPC · JPL
520222	2014 DP_{152}	—	November 11, 2006	Mount Lemmon	Mount Lemmon Survey	·	2.2 km	MPC · JPL
520223	2014 DQ_{152}	—	March 31, 2009	Kitt Peak	Spacewatch	EOS	1.6 km	MPC · JPL
520224	2014 DU_{152}	—	February 28, 2014	Mount Lemmon	Mount Lemmon Survey	·	1.2 km	MPC · JPL
520225	2014 DY_{152}	—	April 7, 2010	Kitt Peak	Spacewatch	·	1.3 km	MPC · JPL
520226	2014 DA_{153}	—	August 20, 2011	Haleakala	Pan-STARRS 1	·	2.6 km	MPC · JPL
520227	2014 DB_{153}	—	September 22, 2011	Kitt Peak	Spacewatch	·	1.9 km	MPC · JPL
520228	2014 DD_{153}	—	September 9, 2007	Mount Lemmon	Mount Lemmon Survey	·	1.4 km	MPC · JPL
520229	2014 DE_{153}	—	October 28, 2008	Kitt Peak	Spacewatch	·	990 m	MPC · JPL
520230	2014 DF_{153}	—	October 2, 2006	Mount Lemmon	Mount Lemmon Survey	EOS	1.7 km	MPC · JPL
520231	2014 DG_{153}	—	May 15, 2009	Mount Lemmon	Mount Lemmon Survey	TIR	2.8 km	MPC · JPL
520232	2014 DH_{153}	—	February 28, 2014	Haleakala	Pan-STARRS 1	MAR	1.0 km	MPC · JPL
520233	2014 DL_{153}	—	February 27, 2008	Kitt Peak	Spacewatch	CYB	3.3 km	MPC · JPL
520234	2014 DP_{153}	—	October 3, 2011	Mount Lemmon	Mount Lemmon Survey	·	2.9 km	MPC · JPL
520235	2014 DU_{153}	—	September 18, 2011	Mount Lemmon	Mount Lemmon Survey	AGN	1.2 km	MPC · JPL
520236	2014 DV_{153}	—	February 28, 2014	Haleakala	Pan-STARRS 1	·	2.9 km	MPC · JPL
520237	2014 DX_{153}	—	August 22, 2004	Kitt Peak	Spacewatch	·	1.9 km	MPC · JPL
520238	2014 DZ_{153}	—	October 20, 2007	Mount Lemmon	Mount Lemmon Survey	·	1.9 km	MPC · JPL
520239	2014 DA_{154}	—	November 9, 2007	Kitt Peak	Spacewatch	KOR	1.4 km	MPC · JPL
520240	2014 DG_{154}	—	February 28, 2014	Haleakala	Pan-STARRS 1	·	1.1 km	MPC · JPL
520241	2014 DJ_{154}	—	November 1, 2008	Mount Lemmon	Mount Lemmon Survey	·	1.4 km	MPC · JPL
520242	2014 DL_{154}	—	January 16, 2013	Mount Lemmon	Mount Lemmon Survey	·	2.7 km	MPC · JPL
520243	2014 DN_{154}	—	October 15, 2007	Mount Lemmon	Mount Lemmon Survey	·	1.7 km	MPC · JPL
520244	2014 DR_{154}	—	September 14, 2007	Mount Lemmon	Mount Lemmon Survey	·	1.6 km	MPC · JPL
520245	2014 DT_{154}	—	February 2, 2009	Catalina	CSS	·	1.8 km	MPC · JPL
520246	2014 DU_{154}	—	September 30, 2006	Mount Lemmon	Mount Lemmon Survey	·	1.9 km	MPC · JPL
520247	2014 DV_{154}	—	September 15, 2007	Mount Lemmon	Mount Lemmon Survey	EUN	1.1 km	MPC · JPL
520248	2014 DY_{154}	—	February 28, 2014	Haleakala	Pan-STARRS 1	·	1.0 km	MPC · JPL
520249	2014 DZ_{154}	—	April 20, 2009	Kitt Peak	Spacewatch	·	1.9 km	MPC · JPL
520250	2014 DB_{155}	—	April 24, 2006	Kitt Peak	Spacewatch	·	950 m	MPC · JPL
520251	2014 DF_{155}	—	December 22, 2012	Haleakala	Pan-STARRS 1	MAR	920 m	MPC · JPL
520252	2014 EF_{13}	—	October 5, 2012	Kitt Peak	Spacewatch	·	1.8 km	MPC · JPL
520253	2014 EP_{13}	—	February 9, 2014	Haleakala	Pan-STARRS 1	·	950 m	MPC · JPL
520254	2014 EP_{19}	—	February 9, 2010	Mount Lemmon	Mount Lemmon Survey	·	1.0 km	MPC · JPL
520255	2014 ES_{30}	—	March 16, 2007	Mount Lemmon	Mount Lemmon Survey	·	1.2 km	MPC · JPL
520256	2014 EG_{38}	—	March 8, 2014	Mount Lemmon	Mount Lemmon Survey	·	1.1 km	MPC · JPL
520257	2014 EE_{39}	—	January 6, 2010	Kitt Peak	Spacewatch	·	1.1 km	MPC · JPL
520258	2014 EJ_{49}	—	August 27, 2011	Haleakala	Pan-STARRS 1	·	1.3 km	MPC · JPL
520259	2014 ES_{60}	—	August 24, 2007	Kitt Peak	Spacewatch	EUN	1.0 km	MPC · JPL
520260	2014 ER_{68}	—	September 20, 2011	Haleakala	Pan-STARRS 1	·	2.0 km	MPC · JPL
520261	2014 EA_{70}	—	February 28, 2014	Haleakala	Pan-STARRS 1	·	2.6 km	MPC · JPL
520262	2014 EY_{101}	—	January 5, 2000	Socorro	LINEAR	·	840 m	MPC · JPL
520263	2014 ET_{105}	—	November 30, 2003	Kitt Peak	Spacewatch	·	1.4 km	MPC · JPL
520264	2014 ER_{109}	—	November 7, 2012	Kitt Peak	Spacewatch	·	2.2 km	MPC · JPL
520265	2014 EB_{118}	—	April 23, 2015	Haleakala	Pan-STARRS 1	·	2.2 km	MPC · JPL
520266	2014 EZ_{121}	—	July 14, 2016	Haleakala	Pan-STARRS 1	·	1.6 km	MPC · JPL
520267	2014 EJ_{124}	—	November 2, 2006	Mount Lemmon	Mount Lemmon Survey	·	3.6 km	MPC · JPL
520268	2014 EQ_{124}	—	September 19, 2011	Haleakala	Pan-STARRS 1	·	2.6 km	MPC · JPL
520269	2014 EM_{136}	—	August 30, 2005	Kitt Peak	Spacewatch	·	2.4 km	MPC · JPL
520270	2014 ES_{143}	—	September 25, 2006	Mount Lemmon	Mount Lemmon Survey	EOS	1.7 km	MPC · JPL
520271	2014 EM_{156}	—	June 11, 2015	Haleakala	Pan-STARRS 1	·	2.3 km	MPC · JPL
520272	2014 ED_{163}	—	September 2, 2011	Haleakala	Pan-STARRS 1	·	1.7 km	MPC · JPL
520273	2014 EW_{167}	—	November 2, 2007	Kitt Peak	Spacewatch	MRX	1.1 km	MPC · JPL
520274	2014 EF_{172}	—	August 10, 2011	Haleakala	Pan-STARRS 1	AGN	900 m	MPC · JPL
520275	2014 EX_{199}	—	October 18, 2012	Haleakala	Pan-STARRS 1	(5)	860 m	MPC · JPL
520276	2014 EL_{211}	—	January 30, 2009	Mount Lemmon	Mount Lemmon Survey	·	2.6 km	MPC · JPL
520277	2014 EF_{212}	—	July 28, 2011	Haleakala	Pan-STARRS 1	·	1.6 km	MPC · JPL
520278	2014 EN_{213}	—	August 25, 2004	Kitt Peak	Spacewatch	PHO	680 m	MPC · JPL
520279	2014 ET_{226}	—	October 20, 2006	Kitt Peak	Spacewatch	·	2.8 km	MPC · JPL
520280	2014 ET_{233}	—	December 1, 2008	Kitt Peak	Spacewatch	(5)	1.0 km	MPC · JPL
520281	2014 EW_{248}	—	February 9, 2008	Kitt Peak	Spacewatch	·	2.2 km	MPC · JPL
520282	2014 EX_{248}	—	February 9, 2008	Mount Lemmon	Mount Lemmon Survey	·	2.7 km	MPC · JPL
520283	2014 EC_{249}	—	December 12, 2012	Kitt Peak	Spacewatch	EOS	1.8 km	MPC · JPL
520284	2014 ED_{249}	—	June 4, 2011	Mount Lemmon	Mount Lemmon Survey	·	1.9 km	MPC · JPL
520285	2014 EJ_{249}	—	February 27, 2014	Mount Lemmon	Mount Lemmon Survey	MRX	1.2 km	MPC · JPL
520286	2014 EN_{249}	—	March 6, 2008	Mount Lemmon	Mount Lemmon Survey	EOS	1.9 km	MPC · JPL
520287	2014 EP_{249}	—	March 11, 2014	Mount Lemmon	Mount Lemmon Survey	·	1.3 km	MPC · JPL
520288	2014 EQ_{249}	—	October 21, 2006	Kitt Peak	Spacewatch	·	3.0 km	MPC · JPL
520289	2014 ES_{249}	—	October 11, 2007	Kitt Peak	Spacewatch	·	1.4 km	MPC · JPL
520290	2014 FA_{3}	—	February 28, 2014	Mount Lemmon	Mount Lemmon Survey	·	1.2 km	MPC · JPL
520291	2014 FT_{18}	—	December 31, 2007	Kitt Peak	Spacewatch	·	3.6 km	MPC · JPL
520292	2014 FA_{19}	—	November 10, 2004	Kitt Peak	Spacewatch	·	1.1 km	MPC · JPL
520293	2014 FL_{27}	—	February 26, 2014	Haleakala	Pan-STARRS 1	·	950 m	MPC · JPL
520294	2014 FB_{28}	—	March 7, 2014	Mount Lemmon	Mount Lemmon Survey	·	2.9 km	MPC · JPL
520295	2014 FV_{30}	—	March 23, 2014	Mount Lemmon	Mount Lemmon Survey	MAR	880 m	MPC · JPL
520296	2014 FE_{48}	—	April 7, 2003	Kitt Peak	Spacewatch	·	850 m	MPC · JPL
520297	2014 FF_{50}	—	February 10, 2010	Kitt Peak	Spacewatch	·	1.2 km	MPC · JPL
520298	2014 FW_{68}	—	September 13, 2007	Mount Lemmon	Mount Lemmon Survey	·	1.6 km	MPC · JPL
520299	2014 FU_{74}	—	March 28, 2014	Mount Lemmon	Mount Lemmon Survey	BRG	1.1 km	MPC · JPL
520300	2014 FA_{75}	—	September 21, 2011	Mount Lemmon	Mount Lemmon Survey	·	2.6 km	MPC · JPL

== 520301–520400 ==
back to top

Designation			Discovery			Properties		Ref
Permanent	Provisional	Named after	Date	Site	Discoverer(s)	Category	Diam.	Ref
520301	2014 FC_{75}	—	April 21, 2006	Kitt Peak	Spacewatch	·	1.2 km	MPC · JPL
520302	2014 FE_{75}	—	March 24, 2014	Haleakala	Pan-STARRS 1	·	2.3 km	MPC · JPL
520303	2014 FL_{75}	—	May 13, 2010	Mount Lemmon	Mount Lemmon Survey	·	1.7 km	MPC · JPL
520304	2014 FM_{75}	—	October 23, 2011	Mount Lemmon	Mount Lemmon Survey	·	1.2 km	MPC · JPL
520305	2014 FN_{75}	—	March 25, 2014	Kitt Peak	Spacewatch	·	1.0 km	MPC · JPL
520306	2014 FP_{75}	—	March 25, 2014	Kitt Peak	Spacewatch	·	850 m	MPC · JPL
520307	2014 FQ_{75}	—	December 22, 2008	Kitt Peak	Spacewatch	·	1.3 km	MPC · JPL
520308	2014 FT_{75}	—	October 29, 2005	Kitt Peak	Spacewatch	·	3.1 km	MPC · JPL
520309	2014 FU_{75}	—	September 24, 2011	Haleakala	Pan-STARRS 1	·	2.9 km	MPC · JPL
520310	2014 FV_{75}	—	May 15, 2009	Kitt Peak	Spacewatch	·	3.4 km	MPC · JPL
520311	2014 FY_{75}	—	March 18, 2009	Kitt Peak	Spacewatch	·	1.6 km	MPC · JPL
520312	2014 FB_{76}	—	February 2, 2009	Kitt Peak	Spacewatch	·	2.2 km	MPC · JPL
520313	2014 FD_{76}	—	April 23, 2009	Kitt Peak	Spacewatch	EOS	2.1 km	MPC · JPL
520314	2014 FO_{76}	—	March 31, 2014	Mount Lemmon	Mount Lemmon Survey	·	1.3 km	MPC · JPL
520315	2014 GN_{15}	—	February 15, 2010	Kitt Peak	Spacewatch	MAS	610 m	MPC · JPL
520316	2014 GR_{25}	—	September 24, 2008	Mount Lemmon	Mount Lemmon Survey	·	1.4 km	MPC · JPL
520317	2014 GR_{43}	—	February 14, 2010	Kitt Peak	Spacewatch	·	1.2 km	MPC · JPL
520318	2014 GN_{49}	—	February 1, 2013	Haleakala	Pan-STARRS 1	·	1.9 km	MPC · JPL
520319	2014 GE_{58}	—	September 12, 2007	Kitt Peak	Spacewatch	·	1.4 km	MPC · JPL
520320	2014 GS_{59}	—	November 4, 2007	Kitt Peak	Spacewatch	·	1.1 km	MPC · JPL
520321	2014 GU_{59}	—	September 28, 2003	Kitt Peak	Spacewatch	·	1.2 km	MPC · JPL
520322	2014 GY_{59}	—	April 1, 2014	Mount Lemmon	Mount Lemmon Survey	·	1.2 km	MPC · JPL
520323	2014 GZ_{59}	—	April 1, 2014	Kitt Peak	Spacewatch	·	1.5 km	MPC · JPL
520324	2014 GA_{60}	—	March 15, 2008	Kitt Peak	Spacewatch	·	2.4 km	MPC · JPL
520325	2014 GC_{60}	—	May 13, 2009	Mount Lemmon	Mount Lemmon Survey	·	1.5 km	MPC · JPL
520326	2014 GH_{60}	—	September 17, 2006	Kitt Peak	Spacewatch	·	2.1 km	MPC · JPL
520327	2014 GJ_{60}	—	September 28, 2011	Mount Lemmon	Mount Lemmon Survey	·	1.2 km	MPC · JPL
520328	2014 GM_{60}	—	April 4, 2014	Haleakala	Pan-STARRS 1	GAL	1.3 km	MPC · JPL
520329	2014 GQ_{60}	—	April 1, 2005	Kitt Peak	Spacewatch	·	1.8 km	MPC · JPL
520330	2014 GT_{60}	—	September 21, 2011	Kitt Peak	Spacewatch	·	1.4 km	MPC · JPL
520331	2014 GV_{60}	—	February 19, 2009	Mount Lemmon	Mount Lemmon Survey	·	1.9 km	MPC · JPL
520332	2014 GW_{60}	—	April 4, 2014	Haleakala	Pan-STARRS 1	BRA	1.5 km	MPC · JPL
520333	2014 GX_{60}	—	March 15, 2008	Kitt Peak	Spacewatch	·	3.1 km	MPC · JPL
520334	2014 GA_{61}	—	October 26, 2011	Haleakala	Pan-STARRS 1	·	2.0 km	MPC · JPL
520335	2014 GD_{61}	—	April 1, 2014	Mount Lemmon	Mount Lemmon Survey	·	1.6 km	MPC · JPL
520336	2014 GJ_{61}	—	April 5, 2014	Haleakala	Pan-STARRS 1	·	2.0 km	MPC · JPL
520337	2014 GT_{61}	—	October 12, 2007	Mount Lemmon	Mount Lemmon Survey	·	1.5 km	MPC · JPL
520338	2014 GB_{62}	—	September 23, 2005	Kitt Peak	Spacewatch	EOS	1.6 km	MPC · JPL
520339	2014 GC_{62}	—	October 13, 2006	Kitt Peak	Spacewatch	·	1.7 km	MPC · JPL
520340	2014 GE_{62}	—	February 14, 2005	Kitt Peak	Spacewatch	·	1.3 km	MPC · JPL
520341	2014 GG_{62}	—	September 18, 2010	Mount Lemmon	Mount Lemmon Survey	·	2.5 km	MPC · JPL
520342	2014 GH_{62}	—	December 22, 2012	Haleakala	Pan-STARRS 1	·	1.3 km	MPC · JPL
520343	2014 GL_{62}	—	April 5, 2014	Haleakala	Pan-STARRS 1	·	2.0 km	MPC · JPL
520344	2014 GR_{62}	—	September 4, 2010	Mount Lemmon	Mount Lemmon Survey	·	3.1 km	MPC · JPL
520345	2014 GS_{62}	—	March 11, 2008	Kitt Peak	Spacewatch	·	3.1 km	MPC · JPL
520346	2014 GT_{62}	—	October 11, 2005	Kitt Peak	Spacewatch	·	2.5 km	MPC · JPL
520347	2014 GU_{62}	—	September 23, 2011	Kitt Peak	Spacewatch	·	1.5 km	MPC · JPL
520348	2014 GV_{62}	—	November 9, 2007	Kitt Peak	Spacewatch	·	1.8 km	MPC · JPL
520349	2014 GB_{63}	—	September 12, 2005	Kitt Peak	Spacewatch	·	1.7 km	MPC · JPL
520350	2014 GD_{63}	—	April 5, 2014	Haleakala	Pan-STARRS 1	·	770 m	MPC · JPL
520351	2014 GK_{63}	—	April 5, 2014	Haleakala	Pan-STARRS 1	·	1.7 km	MPC · JPL
520352	2014 GM_{63}	—	April 5, 2014	Haleakala	Pan-STARRS 1	·	1.1 km	MPC · JPL
520353	2014 GO_{63}	—	April 4, 2008	Kitt Peak	Spacewatch	·	3.6 km	MPC · JPL
520354	2014 GQ_{63}	—	April 30, 2009	Kitt Peak	Spacewatch	·	1.9 km	MPC · JPL
520355	2014 GS_{63}	—	October 26, 2011	Haleakala	Pan-STARRS 1	KOR	1.3 km	MPC · JPL
520356	2014 GU_{63}	—	April 5, 2014	Haleakala	Pan-STARRS 1	·	1.1 km	MPC · JPL
520357	2014 GD_{64}	—	October 24, 2011	Haleakala	Pan-STARRS 1	EOS	1.6 km	MPC · JPL
520358	2014 GL_{64}	—	February 3, 2009	Kitt Peak	Spacewatch	MIS	2.4 km	MPC · JPL
520359	2014 GN_{64}	—	April 9, 2014	Haleakala	Pan-STARRS 1	EOS	1.9 km	MPC · JPL
520360	2014 GP_{64}	—	September 18, 2010	Mount Lemmon	Mount Lemmon Survey	·	2.4 km	MPC · JPL
520361	2014 HR_{7}	—	March 25, 2014	Kitt Peak	Spacewatch	·	2.0 km	MPC · JPL
520362	2014 HN_{11}	—	March 16, 2010	Kitt Peak	Spacewatch	·	1.1 km	MPC · JPL
520363	2014 HQ_{34}	—	May 19, 2010	Mount Lemmon	Mount Lemmon Survey	EUN	770 m	MPC · JPL
520364	2014 HV_{107}	—	November 7, 2012	Mount Lemmon	Mount Lemmon Survey	·	1.1 km	MPC · JPL
520365	2014 HK_{160}	—	January 26, 2006	Kitt Peak	Spacewatch	·	980 m	MPC · JPL
520366	2014 HW_{162}	—	February 3, 2013	Haleakala	Pan-STARRS 1	·	2.1 km	MPC · JPL
520367	2014 HS_{202}	—	May 9, 2006	Mount Lemmon	Mount Lemmon Survey	·	1.0 km	MPC · JPL
520368	2014 HP_{203}	—	April 30, 2014	Haleakala	Pan-STARRS 1	·	800 m	MPC · JPL
520369	2014 HR_{203}	—	February 20, 2009	Catalina	CSS	·	1.9 km	MPC · JPL
520370	2014 HF_{204}	—	December 22, 2012	Haleakala	Pan-STARRS 1	·	1.4 km	MPC · JPL
520371	2014 HL_{204}	—	March 7, 2014	Mount Lemmon	Mount Lemmon Survey	·	1.4 km	MPC · JPL
520372	2014 HM_{204}	—	October 26, 2011	Haleakala	Pan-STARRS 1	·	1.2 km	MPC · JPL
520373	2014 HP_{204}	—	October 6, 2004	Kitt Peak	Spacewatch	·	1.2 km	MPC · JPL
520374	2014 HT_{204}	—	November 8, 2007	Kitt Peak	Spacewatch	·	1.8 km	MPC · JPL
520375	2014 HU_{204}	—	October 21, 2007	Mount Lemmon	Mount Lemmon Survey	·	1.2 km	MPC · JPL
520376	2014 HA_{205}	—	October 28, 2011	Mount Lemmon	Mount Lemmon Survey	·	1.2 km	MPC · JPL
520377	2014 HC_{205}	—	April 24, 2014	Haleakala	Pan-STARRS 1	EOS	2.0 km	MPC · JPL
520378	2014 HK_{205}	—	May 21, 2006	Kitt Peak	Spacewatch	MAR	830 m	MPC · JPL
520379	2014 HN_{205}	—	December 21, 2008	Kitt Peak	Spacewatch	·	1.0 km	MPC · JPL
520380	2014 HA_{206}	—	September 23, 2011	Haleakala	Pan-STARRS 1	·	1.6 km	MPC · JPL
520381	2014 HE_{206}	—	September 23, 2011	Kitt Peak	Spacewatch	·	1.7 km	MPC · JPL
520382	2014 HG_{206}	—	August 27, 2006	Kitt Peak	Spacewatch	·	1.5 km	MPC · JPL
520383	2014 HK_{206}	—	September 30, 2005	Mount Lemmon	Mount Lemmon Survey	·	1.8 km	MPC · JPL
520384	2014 HL_{206}	—	September 18, 2010	Mount Lemmon	Mount Lemmon Survey	LIX	3.5 km	MPC · JPL
520385	2014 HO_{206}	—	April 23, 2014	Mount Lemmon	Mount Lemmon Survey	·	1.2 km	MPC · JPL
520386	2014 HY_{206}	—	April 25, 2014	Mount Lemmon	Mount Lemmon Survey	·	860 m	MPC · JPL
520387	2014 HA_{207}	—	April 30, 2014	Haleakala	Pan-STARRS 1	V	520 m	MPC · JPL
520388	2014 HB_{207}	—	August 28, 2006	Kitt Peak	Spacewatch	·	1.3 km	MPC · JPL
520389	2014 HF_{207}	—	September 29, 2011	Kitt Peak	Spacewatch	WIT	1.1 km	MPC · JPL
520390	2014 HO_{207}	—	April 30, 2014	Haleakala	Pan-STARRS 1	JUN	770 m	MPC · JPL
520391	2014 HY_{207}	—	January 17, 2013	Haleakala	Pan-STARRS 1	·	1.4 km	MPC · JPL
520392	2014 HZ_{207}	—	November 28, 2011	Haleakala	Pan-STARRS 1	CYB	3.6 km	MPC · JPL
520393	2014 HH_{208}	—	April 30, 2014	Haleakala	Pan-STARRS 1	MAR	770 m	MPC · JPL
520394	2014 JJ_{10}	—	April 29, 2014	Kitt Peak	Spacewatch	·	870 m	MPC · JPL
520395	2014 JX_{11}	—	April 8, 2010	Mount Lemmon	Mount Lemmon Survey	NYS	920 m	MPC · JPL
520396	2014 JT_{26}	—	October 20, 2011	Haleakala	Pan-STARRS 1	PHO	830 m	MPC · JPL
520397	2014 JB_{42}	—	March 14, 2010	WISE	WISE	·	1.9 km	MPC · JPL
520398	2014 JF_{42}	—	May 5, 2014	Mount Lemmon	Mount Lemmon Survey	·	1.1 km	MPC · JPL
520399	2014 JQ_{54}	—	September 15, 2006	Kitt Peak	Spacewatch	·	790 m	MPC · JPL
520400	2014 JT_{60}	—	May 5, 2014	Mount Lemmon	Mount Lemmon Survey	EUN	890 m	MPC · JPL

== 520401–520500 ==
back to top

Designation			Discovery			Properties		Ref
Permanent	Provisional	Named after	Date	Site	Discoverer(s)	Category	Diam.	Ref
520401	2014 JY_{70}	—	October 15, 2007	Kitt Peak	Spacewatch	·	1.4 km	MPC · JPL
520402	2014 JY_{74}	—	April 30, 2014	Haleakala	Pan-STARRS 1	·	1.2 km	MPC · JPL
520403	2014 JX_{77}	—	October 18, 2011	Mount Lemmon	Mount Lemmon Survey	KON	1.7 km	MPC · JPL
520404	2014 JB_{84}	—	January 19, 2005	Kitt Peak	Spacewatch	·	1.0 km	MPC · JPL
520405	2014 JB_{85}	—	November 2, 2007	Mount Lemmon	Mount Lemmon Survey	·	930 m	MPC · JPL
520406	2014 JA_{87}	—	January 18, 2005	Kitt Peak	Spacewatch	·	1.2 km	MPC · JPL
520407	2014 JM_{87}	—	March 8, 2008	Mount Lemmon	Mount Lemmon Survey	·	2.4 km	MPC · JPL
520408	2014 JN_{87}	—	November 11, 2006	Kitt Peak	Spacewatch	EOS	2.1 km	MPC · JPL
520409	2014 JO_{87}	—	August 30, 2005	Kitt Peak	Spacewatch	EOS	1.8 km	MPC · JPL
520410	2014 JR_{87}	—	September 23, 2011	Haleakala	Pan-STARRS 1	·	1.9 km	MPC · JPL
520411	2014 JY_{87}	—	October 26, 2011	Haleakala	Pan-STARRS 1	·	1.6 km	MPC · JPL
520412	2014 JZ_{87}	—	August 27, 2006	Kitt Peak	Spacewatch	·	1.6 km	MPC · JPL
520413	2014 JU_{88}	—	May 16, 2005	Mount Lemmon	Mount Lemmon Survey	·	1.6 km	MPC · JPL
520414	2014 JW_{88}	—	October 21, 1995	Kitt Peak	Spacewatch	·	1.7 km	MPC · JPL
520415	2014 JE_{89}	—	May 6, 2014	Haleakala	Pan-STARRS 1	EOS	2.1 km	MPC · JPL
520416	2014 JM_{89}	—	October 28, 2011	Mount Lemmon	Mount Lemmon Survey	·	1.9 km	MPC · JPL
520417	2014 JN_{89}	—	May 6, 2014	Haleakala	Pan-STARRS 1	·	1.5 km	MPC · JPL
520418	2014 JO_{89}	—	October 28, 2011	Mount Lemmon	Mount Lemmon Survey	·	2.4 km	MPC · JPL
520419	2014 JW_{89}	—	May 6, 2014	Haleakala	Pan-STARRS 1	EOS	1.9 km	MPC · JPL
520420	2014 JX_{89}	—	January 12, 2002	Kitt Peak	Spacewatch	·	2.2 km	MPC · JPL
520421	2014 JE_{90}	—	January 10, 2013	Haleakala	Pan-STARRS 1	·	2.2 km	MPC · JPL
520422	2014 JS_{90}	—	June 4, 2005	Kitt Peak	Spacewatch	·	1.8 km	MPC · JPL
520423	2014 JT_{90}	—	May 9, 2014	Haleakala	Pan-STARRS 1	EUN	1.1 km	MPC · JPL
520424	2014 JV_{90}	—	September 26, 2011	Haleakala	Pan-STARRS 1	·	900 m	MPC · JPL
520425	2014 JW_{90}	—	October 18, 2007	Kitt Peak	Spacewatch	·	1.2 km	MPC · JPL
520426	2014 JZ_{90}	—	September 19, 2010	Kitt Peak	Spacewatch	·	3.3 km	MPC · JPL
520427	2014 JF_{91}	—	December 5, 2007	Kitt Peak	Spacewatch	·	1.6 km	MPC · JPL
520428	2014 JK_{91}	—	October 17, 2010	Mount Lemmon	Mount Lemmon Survey	·	2.4 km	MPC · JPL
520429	2014 JO_{91}	—	December 9, 2012	Mount Lemmon	Mount Lemmon Survey	·	1.6 km	MPC · JPL
520430	2014 JT_{91}	—	February 9, 2013	Haleakala	Pan-STARRS 1	·	2.2 km	MPC · JPL
520431	2014 JU_{91}	—	February 13, 2008	Mount Lemmon	Mount Lemmon Survey	·	1.4 km	MPC · JPL
520432	2014 JV_{91}	—	January 19, 2013	Kitt Peak	Spacewatch	·	1.3 km	MPC · JPL
520433	2014 JX_{91}	—	March 8, 2013	Haleakala	Pan-STARRS 1	·	2.7 km	MPC · JPL
520434	2014 KN	—	October 28, 2011	Mount Lemmon	Mount Lemmon Survey	EUN	1.3 km	MPC · JPL
520435	2014 KU_{2}	—	October 16, 2011	Haleakala	Pan-STARRS 1	·	1.2 km	MPC · JPL
520436	2014 KR_{4}	—	October 24, 2008	Kitt Peak	Spacewatch	·	1.4 km	MPC · JPL
520437	2014 KF_{16}	—	November 8, 2007	Kitt Peak	Spacewatch	·	1.1 km	MPC · JPL
520438	2014 KU_{28}	—	May 7, 2014	Haleakala	Pan-STARRS 1	·	950 m	MPC · JPL
520439	2014 KW_{32}	—	May 8, 2005	Mount Lemmon	Mount Lemmon Survey	·	1.3 km	MPC · JPL
520440	2014 KQ_{42}	—	May 21, 2014	Haleakala	Pan-STARRS 1	EUN	840 m	MPC · JPL
520441	2014 KW_{51}	—	April 30, 2014	Haleakala	Pan-STARRS 1	·	950 m	MPC · JPL
520442	2014 KM_{59}	—	September 29, 2011	Mount Lemmon	Mount Lemmon Survey	·	930 m	MPC · JPL
520443	2014 KK_{65}	—	February 10, 2008	Mount Lemmon	Mount Lemmon Survey	·	1.6 km	MPC · JPL
520444	2014 KQ_{73}	—	May 7, 2014	Haleakala	Pan-STARRS 1	·	1.7 km	MPC · JPL
520445	2014 KU_{90}	—	May 8, 2014	Haleakala	Pan-STARRS 1	·	1.1 km	MPC · JPL
520446	2014 KH_{94}	—	May 21, 2014	Haleakala	Pan-STARRS 1	·	1.1 km	MPC · JPL
520447	2014 KR_{99}	—	June 1, 2010	Kitt Peak	Spacewatch	·	1.0 km	MPC · JPL
520448	2014 KJ_{104}	—	May 19, 2006	Mount Lemmon	Mount Lemmon Survey	·	990 m	MPC · JPL
520449	2014 KC_{105}	—	October 20, 2007	Mount Lemmon	Mount Lemmon Survey	MAR	760 m	MPC · JPL
520450	2014 KQ_{105}	—	June 23, 2010	Mount Lemmon	Mount Lemmon Survey	EUN	1.1 km	MPC · JPL
520451	2014 KW_{106}	—	February 5, 2013	Mount Lemmon	Mount Lemmon Survey	AGN	1.0 km	MPC · JPL
520452	2014 KX_{106}	—	March 31, 2009	Mount Lemmon	Mount Lemmon Survey	AGN	940 m	MPC · JPL
520453	2014 KC_{107}	—	May 20, 2014	Haleakala	Pan-STARRS 1	PHO	860 m	MPC · JPL
520454	2014 KH_{107}	—	November 12, 2005	Kitt Peak	Spacewatch	URS	2.3 km	MPC · JPL
520455	2014 KL_{107}	—	September 19, 2011	Haleakala	Pan-STARRS 1	·	1.1 km	MPC · JPL
520456	2014 KQ_{107}	—	February 28, 2008	Kitt Peak	Spacewatch	·	2.1 km	MPC · JPL
520457	2014 KU_{107}	—	May 21, 2014	Haleakala	Pan-STARRS 1	·	1.0 km	MPC · JPL
520458	2014 KV_{107}	—	April 27, 2009	Mount Lemmon	Mount Lemmon Survey	KOR	1.2 km	MPC · JPL
520459	2014 KY_{107}	—	September 3, 2010	Mount Lemmon	Mount Lemmon Survey	·	2.7 km	MPC · JPL
520460	2014 KA_{108}	—	March 15, 2005	Mount Lemmon	Mount Lemmon Survey	MIS	2.5 km	MPC · JPL
520461	2014 KE_{108}	—	January 10, 2008	Mount Lemmon	Mount Lemmon Survey	·	1.5 km	MPC · JPL
520462	2014 KJ_{108}	—	December 25, 2011	Mount Lemmon	Mount Lemmon Survey	EOS	1.8 km	MPC · JPL
520463	2014 KK_{108}	—	September 30, 2011	Mount Lemmon	Mount Lemmon Survey	·	1.5 km	MPC · JPL
520464	2014 KM_{108}	—	October 16, 2006	Kitt Peak	Spacewatch	·	1.6 km	MPC · JPL
520465	2014 KP_{108}	—	May 21, 2014	Haleakala	Pan-STARRS 1	·	1.2 km	MPC · JPL
520466	2014 KS_{108}	—	May 21, 2014	Haleakala	Pan-STARRS 1	·	1.7 km	MPC · JPL
520467	2014 KV_{108}	—	November 18, 2006	Kitt Peak	Spacewatch	·	2.0 km	MPC · JPL
520468	2014 KW_{108}	—	December 29, 2008	Mount Lemmon	Mount Lemmon Survey	·	1.0 km	MPC · JPL
520469	2014 KD_{109}	—	September 29, 2010	Mount Lemmon	Mount Lemmon Survey	·	2.5 km	MPC · JPL
520470	2014 KF_{109}	—	January 6, 2013	Kitt Peak	Spacewatch	GEF	1.1 km	MPC · JPL
520471	2014 KO_{109}	—	May 23, 2014	Haleakala	Pan-STARRS 1	·	940 m	MPC · JPL
520472	2014 KP_{109}	—	May 23, 2014	Haleakala	Pan-STARRS 1	·	1.3 km	MPC · JPL
520473	2014 KQ_{109}	—	March 11, 2008	Kitt Peak	Spacewatch	EMA	2.7 km	MPC · JPL
520474	2014 KD_{110}	—	May 23, 2014	Haleakala	Pan-STARRS 1	·	1.5 km	MPC · JPL
520475	2014 KG_{110}	—	June 8, 2005	Kitt Peak	Spacewatch	·	1.9 km	MPC · JPL
520476	2014 KJ_{110}	—	May 5, 2014	Mount Lemmon	Mount Lemmon Survey	·	1.8 km	MPC · JPL
520477	2014 KK_{110}	—	February 15, 2013	Haleakala	Pan-STARRS 1	·	2.5 km	MPC · JPL
520478	2014 KM_{110}	—	February 14, 2013	Haleakala	Pan-STARRS 1	EOS	1.7 km	MPC · JPL
520479	2014 KO_{110}	—	February 15, 2013	Haleakala	Pan-STARRS 1	EOS	1.4 km	MPC · JPL
520480	2014 KZ_{110}	—	May 25, 2014	Haleakala	Pan-STARRS 1	·	2.9 km	MPC · JPL
520481	2014 KA_{111}	—	February 2, 2013	Mount Lemmon	Mount Lemmon Survey	·	2.1 km	MPC · JPL
520482	2014 KB_{111}	—	August 21, 2006	Kitt Peak	Spacewatch	·	1.3 km	MPC · JPL
520483	2014 KD_{111}	—	May 25, 2014	Haleakala	Pan-STARRS 1	(13314)	1.8 km	MPC · JPL
520484	2014 KG_{111}	—	December 29, 2011	Mount Lemmon	Mount Lemmon Survey	·	3.1 km	MPC · JPL
520485	2014 KJ_{111}	—	April 6, 2008	Mount Lemmon	Mount Lemmon Survey	·	2.3 km	MPC · JPL
520486	2014 KL_{111}	—	January 20, 2008	Kitt Peak	Spacewatch	·	1.8 km	MPC · JPL
520487	2014 KM_{111}	—	March 18, 2013	Mount Lemmon	Mount Lemmon Survey	·	2.9 km	MPC · JPL
520488	2014 KR_{111}	—	May 26, 2014	Haleakala	Pan-STARRS 1	·	940 m	MPC · JPL
520489	2014 KT_{111}	—	October 12, 2007	Kitt Peak	Spacewatch	·	1.5 km	MPC · JPL
520490	2014 KD_{112}	—	February 3, 2013	Haleakala	Pan-STARRS 1	·	1.3 km	MPC · JPL
520491	2014 KH_{112}	—	April 30, 2009	Kitt Peak	Spacewatch	·	1.5 km	MPC · JPL
520492	2014 KP_{112}	—	April 12, 2013	Haleakala	Pan-STARRS 1	EOS	2.0 km	MPC · JPL
520493	2014 KQ_{112}	—	November 30, 2011	Kitt Peak	Spacewatch	·	2.7 km	MPC · JPL
520494	2014 KS_{112}	—	May 7, 2014	Haleakala	Pan-STARRS 1	EOS	2.4 km	MPC · JPL
520495	2014 KT_{112}	—	November 9, 2007	Kitt Peak	Spacewatch	V	840 m	MPC · JPL
520496	2014 LA_{11}	—	May 23, 2014	Kitt Peak	Spacewatch	EUN	840 m	MPC · JPL
520497	2014 LW_{11}	—	October 20, 2006	Kitt Peak	Spacewatch	MRX	1.2 km	MPC · JPL
520498	2014 LV_{12}	—	January 20, 2009	Kitt Peak	Spacewatch	·	1.1 km	MPC · JPL
520499	2014 LV_{20}	—	May 6, 2014	Haleakala	Pan-STARRS 1	JUN	800 m	MPC · JPL
520500	2014 LQ_{29}	—	May 11, 2010	Mount Lemmon	Mount Lemmon Survey	EUN	1.1 km	MPC · JPL

== 520501–520600 ==
back to top

Designation			Discovery			Properties		Ref
Permanent	Provisional	Named after	Date	Site	Discoverer(s)	Category	Diam.	Ref
520501	2014 LR_{29}	—	September 15, 2007	Mount Lemmon	Mount Lemmon Survey	MAR	1.1 km	MPC · JPL
520502	2014 LL_{30}	—	September 16, 2009	Kitt Peak	Spacewatch	·	2.7 km	MPC · JPL
520503	2014 LQ_{30}	—	February 21, 2013	Haleakala	Pan-STARRS 1	·	2.9 km	MPC · JPL
520504	2014 LX_{30}	—	December 7, 2005	Kitt Peak	Spacewatch	·	2.8 km	MPC · JPL
520505	2014 LA_{31}	—	August 21, 2004	Kitt Peak	Spacewatch	·	1.7 km	MPC · JPL
520506	2014 LC_{31}	—	July 29, 2009	Kitt Peak	Spacewatch	EOS	1.4 km	MPC · JPL
520507	2014 LD_{31}	—	August 29, 2009	Kitt Peak	Spacewatch	·	2.7 km	MPC · JPL
520508	2014 LE_{31}	—	August 29, 2005	Kitt Peak	Spacewatch	·	2.4 km	MPC · JPL
520509	2014 LF_{31}	—	December 10, 2006	Kitt Peak	Spacewatch	·	2.3 km	MPC · JPL
520510	2014 LM_{31}	—	May 1, 2013	Mount Lemmon	Mount Lemmon Survey	·	2.2 km	MPC · JPL
520511	2014 LP_{31}	—	March 31, 2009	Kitt Peak	Spacewatch	·	1.3 km	MPC · JPL
520512	2014 LQ_{31}	—	October 9, 2004	Kitt Peak	Spacewatch	·	2.4 km	MPC · JPL
520513	2014 LS_{31}	—	November 28, 2010	Mount Lemmon	Mount Lemmon Survey	CYB	4.0 km	MPC · JPL
520514	2014 LT_{31}	—	June 3, 2014	Haleakala	Pan-STARRS 1	·	2.8 km	MPC · JPL
520515	2014 LA_{32}	—	June 4, 2014	Haleakala	Pan-STARRS 1	EUN	1.3 km	MPC · JPL
520516	2014 LC_{32}	—	November 3, 2010	Mount Lemmon	Mount Lemmon Survey	(31811)	3.1 km	MPC · JPL
520517	2014 LG_{32}	—	October 11, 2005	Kitt Peak	Spacewatch	·	2.0 km	MPC · JPL
520518	2014 LJ_{32}	—	May 7, 2014	Haleakala	Pan-STARRS 1	·	960 m	MPC · JPL
520519	2014 LO_{32}	—	October 11, 2010	Mount Lemmon	Mount Lemmon Survey	EOS	1.5 km	MPC · JPL
520520	2014 LP_{32}	—	June 8, 2014	Haleakala	Pan-STARRS 1	·	1.5 km	MPC · JPL
520521	2014 MQ_{2}	—	April 25, 2010	Mount Lemmon	Mount Lemmon Survey	·	1.3 km	MPC · JPL
520522	2014 MT_{4}	—	September 5, 2000	Anderson Mesa	LONEOS	·	1.9 km	MPC · JPL
520523	2014 MF_{15}	—	April 10, 2014	Haleakala	Pan-STARRS 1	·	1.8 km	MPC · JPL
520524	2014 MV_{25}	—	June 25, 2014	Mount Lemmon	Mount Lemmon Survey	·	1.9 km	MPC · JPL
520525	2014 MG_{42}	—	April 4, 2014	Haleakala	Pan-STARRS 1	HNS	1.1 km	MPC · JPL
520526	2014 MO_{45}	—	September 30, 2011	Kitt Peak	Spacewatch	(194)	1.6 km	MPC · JPL
520527	2014 MH_{49}	—	May 25, 2014	Haleakala	Pan-STARRS 1	EUN	1.2 km	MPC · JPL
520528	2014 MD_{73}	—	May 17, 2009	Mount Lemmon	Mount Lemmon Survey	·	1.3 km	MPC · JPL
520529	2014 MV_{73}	—	June 9, 2008	Kitt Peak	Spacewatch	·	3.2 km	MPC · JPL
520530	2014 MA_{74}	—	May 25, 2009	Kitt Peak	Spacewatch	·	1.4 km	MPC · JPL
520531	2014 ME_{74}	—	December 24, 2005	Kitt Peak	Spacewatch	·	3.2 km	MPC · JPL
520532	2014 MO_{74}	—	March 6, 2013	Haleakala	Pan-STARRS 1	·	2.1 km	MPC · JPL
520533	2014 MW_{74}	—	April 9, 2013	Haleakala	Pan-STARRS 1	EOS	1.6 km	MPC · JPL
520534	2014 MX_{74}	—	November 13, 2010	Mount Lemmon	Mount Lemmon Survey	·	1.9 km	MPC · JPL
520535	2014 MY_{74}	—	January 18, 2012	Kitt Peak	Spacewatch	·	3.4 km	MPC · JPL
520536	2014 MB_{75}	—	November 12, 2005	Kitt Peak	Spacewatch	EOS	2.0 km	MPC · JPL
520537	2014 ME_{75}	—	September 10, 2010	Mount Lemmon	Mount Lemmon Survey	·	1.8 km	MPC · JPL
520538	2014 MG_{75}	—	September 21, 2003	Kitt Peak	Spacewatch	·	3.7 km	MPC · JPL
520539	2014 MJ_{75}	—	June 21, 2014	Mount Lemmon	Mount Lemmon Survey	EOS	1.7 km	MPC · JPL
520540	2014 MK_{75}	—	January 25, 2012	Haleakala	Pan-STARRS 1	·	2.1 km	MPC · JPL
520541	2014 MR_{75}	—	January 26, 2012	Mount Lemmon	Mount Lemmon Survey	·	2.8 km	MPC · JPL
520542	2014 MX_{75}	—	June 27, 2014	Haleakala	Pan-STARRS 1	TIR	2.8 km	MPC · JPL
520543	2014 MD_{76}	—	October 27, 2006	Kitt Peak	Spacewatch	·	1.4 km	MPC · JPL
520544	2014 MF_{76}	—	September 3, 2010	Mount Lemmon	Mount Lemmon Survey	·	2.9 km	MPC · JPL
520545	2014 MH_{76}	—	April 11, 2013	Mount Lemmon	Mount Lemmon Survey	·	2.4 km	MPC · JPL
520546	2014 MK_{76}	—	February 8, 2008	Kitt Peak	Spacewatch	·	1.4 km	MPC · JPL
520547	2014 MM_{76}	—	February 3, 2012	Haleakala	Pan-STARRS 1	·	2.6 km	MPC · JPL
520548	2014 MP_{76}	—	August 30, 2005	Kitt Peak	Spacewatch	·	1.5 km	MPC · JPL
520549	2014 MS_{76}	—	April 19, 2013	Haleakala	Pan-STARRS 1	·	2.8 km	MPC · JPL
520550	2014 MY_{76}	—	November 12, 2010	Mount Lemmon	Mount Lemmon Survey	DOR	2.0 km	MPC · JPL
520551	2014 MC_{77}	—	January 31, 2009	Kitt Peak	Spacewatch	·	720 m	MPC · JPL
520552	2014 MD_{77}	—	June 29, 2014	Haleakala	Pan-STARRS 1	HNS	910 m	MPC · JPL
520553	2014 MF_{77}	—	February 15, 2013	Haleakala	Pan-STARRS 1	·	1.1 km	MPC · JPL
520554	2014 MG_{77}	—	January 29, 2007	Kitt Peak	Spacewatch	·	2.2 km	MPC · JPL
520555	2014 MJ_{77}	—	September 2, 2010	Mount Lemmon	Mount Lemmon Survey	·	1.5 km	MPC · JPL
520556	2014 MQ_{77}	—	August 18, 2009	Kitt Peak	Spacewatch	·	2.4 km	MPC · JPL
520557	2014 MT_{77}	—	December 2, 2010	Mount Lemmon	Mount Lemmon Survey	CYB	3.6 km	MPC · JPL
520558	2014 MV_{77}	—	March 15, 2007	Kitt Peak	Spacewatch	·	2.9 km	MPC · JPL
520559	2014 MY_{77}	—	October 18, 2011	Mount Lemmon	Mount Lemmon Survey	·	980 m	MPC · JPL
520560	2014 MZ_{77}	—	June 30, 2014	Haleakala	Pan-STARRS 1	·	2.2 km	MPC · JPL
520561	2014 MC_{78}	—	October 2, 2006	Kitt Peak	Spacewatch	EUN	960 m	MPC · JPL
520562	2014 NV_{1}	—	November 3, 2007	Kitt Peak	Spacewatch	·	1.5 km	MPC · JPL
520563	2014 NK_{18}	—	February 2, 2005	Kitt Peak	Spacewatch	·	1.1 km	MPC · JPL
520564	2014 NH_{35}	—	July 2, 2014	Haleakala	Pan-STARRS 1	BRA	1.3 km	MPC · JPL
520565	2014 NQ_{52}	—	July 2, 2014	Haleakala	Pan-STARRS 1	·	2.0 km	MPC · JPL
520566	2014 NX_{55}	—	June 28, 2014	Haleakala	Pan-STARRS 1	·	1.7 km	MPC · JPL
520567	2014 NR_{65}	—	May 5, 2008	Catalina	CSS	·	3.8 km	MPC · JPL
520568	2014 NM_{69}	—	July 1, 2014	Haleakala	Pan-STARRS 1	·	2.4 km	MPC · JPL
520569	2014 NR_{69}	—	April 18, 2013	Kitt Peak	Spacewatch	·	2.8 km	MPC · JPL
520570	2014 NS_{69}	—	February 23, 2007	Catalina	CSS	EUP	3.4 km	MPC · JPL
520571	2014 NC_{70}	—	January 4, 2012	Mount Lemmon	Mount Lemmon Survey	EOS	1.9 km	MPC · JPL
520572	2014 NJ_{70}	—	December 20, 2007	Kitt Peak	Spacewatch	·	1.9 km	MPC · JPL
520573	2014 NO_{70}	—	March 12, 2007	Mount Lemmon	Mount Lemmon Survey	·	2.0 km	MPC · JPL
520574	2014 NB_{71}	—	August 17, 2009	Kitt Peak	Spacewatch	·	2.2 km	MPC · JPL
520575	2014 NC_{71}	—	October 15, 2004	Kitt Peak	Spacewatch	·	2.2 km	MPC · JPL
520576	2014 NG_{71}	—	September 17, 2010	Mount Lemmon	Mount Lemmon Survey	AGN	890 m	MPC · JPL
520577	2014 NQ_{71}	—	December 13, 2006	Kitt Peak	Spacewatch	NEM	1.9 km	MPC · JPL
520578	2014 NB_{72}	—	December 8, 2005	Kitt Peak	Spacewatch	·	2.2 km	MPC · JPL
520579	2014 NE_{72}	—	July 8, 2014	Haleakala	Pan-STARRS 1	·	2.0 km	MPC · JPL
520580	2014 NM_{72}	—	February 23, 2007	Kitt Peak	Spacewatch	·	2.7 km	MPC · JPL
520581	2014 NP_{72}	—	March 16, 2013	Kitt Peak	Spacewatch	MRX	770 m	MPC · JPL
520582	2014 NR_{72}	—	January 30, 2012	Mount Lemmon	Mount Lemmon Survey	·	2.3 km	MPC · JPL
520583	2014 NT_{72}	—	July 8, 2014	Haleakala	Pan-STARRS 1	·	1.9 km	MPC · JPL
520584	2014 NZ_{72}	—	April 11, 2013	Mount Lemmon	Mount Lemmon Survey	·	2.5 km	MPC · JPL
520585 Saci	2014 OA_{2}	Saci	July 23, 2014	SONEAR	SONEAR	AMO	180 m	MPC · JPL
520586	2014 OO_{36}	—	February 14, 2013	Haleakala	Pan-STARRS 1	DOR	1.9 km	MPC · JPL
520587	2014 OZ_{79}	—	June 4, 2014	Haleakala	Pan-STARRS 1	·	1.8 km	MPC · JPL
520588	2014 OC_{92}	—	October 25, 2011	Haleakala	Pan-STARRS 1	DOR	2.3 km	MPC · JPL
520589	2014 ON_{126}	—	March 8, 2013	Haleakala	Pan-STARRS 1	·	1.6 km	MPC · JPL
520590	2014 ON_{134}	—	May 17, 2009	Mount Lemmon	Mount Lemmon Survey	·	1.6 km	MPC · JPL
520591	2014 OJ_{191}	—	October 22, 2009	Mount Lemmon	Mount Lemmon Survey	·	1.8 km	MPC · JPL
520592	2014 OC_{239}	—	July 27, 2014	Haleakala	Pan-STARRS 1	NAE	2.1 km	MPC · JPL
520593	2014 OE_{381}	—	June 2, 2014	Haleakala	Pan-STARRS 1	·	1.0 km	MPC · JPL
520594	2014 OQ_{385}	—	February 9, 2008	Kitt Peak	Spacewatch	·	1.7 km	MPC · JPL
520595	2014 OM_{387}	—	October 18, 2001	Kitt Peak	Spacewatch	AGN	1.1 km	MPC · JPL
520596	2014 OM_{399}	—	February 25, 2007	Kitt Peak	Spacewatch	KOR	1.3 km	MPC · JPL
520597	2014 OZ_{404}	—	September 9, 2008	Kitt Peak	Spacewatch	SYL · CYB	4.2 km	MPC · JPL
520598	2014 OK_{405}	—	October 9, 2010	Mount Lemmon	Mount Lemmon Survey	AGN	840 m	MPC · JPL
520599	2014 OR_{405}	—	July 25, 2014	Haleakala	Pan-STARRS 1	·	1.2 km	MPC · JPL
520600	2014 OY_{405}	—	September 2, 2010	Mount Lemmon	Mount Lemmon Survey	·	1.2 km	MPC · JPL

== 520601–520700 ==
back to top

Designation			Discovery			Properties		Ref
Permanent	Provisional	Named after	Date	Site	Discoverer(s)	Category	Diam.	Ref
520601	2014 OK_{406}	—	February 3, 2012	Haleakala	Pan-STARRS 1	EOS	1.5 km	MPC · JPL
520602	2014 OV_{406}	—	November 10, 2010	Mount Lemmon	Mount Lemmon Survey	KOR	980 m	MPC · JPL
520603	2014 OR_{407}	—	January 2, 2012	Mount Lemmon	Mount Lemmon Survey	·	1.5 km	MPC · JPL
520604	2014 OH_{408}	—	July 25, 2014	Haleakala	Pan-STARRS 1	·	2.1 km	MPC · JPL
520605	2014 OX_{408}	—	July 25, 2014	Haleakala	Pan-STARRS 1	·	1.6 km	MPC · JPL
520606	2014 OM_{409}	—	January 30, 2012	Kitt Peak	Spacewatch	·	2.4 km	MPC · JPL
520607	2014 OP_{409}	—	January 27, 2012	Mount Lemmon	Mount Lemmon Survey	·	2.1 km	MPC · JPL
520608	2014 OH_{411}	—	December 2, 2005	Kitt Peak	Spacewatch	TEL	1.3 km	MPC · JPL
520609	2014 OK_{411}	—	September 1, 2005	Kitt Peak	Spacewatch	HOF	2.3 km	MPC · JPL
520610	2014 OO_{411}	—	August 30, 2005	Kitt Peak	Spacewatch	AGN	920 m	MPC · JPL
520611	2014 OX_{411}	—	September 30, 2010	Mount Lemmon	Mount Lemmon Survey	·	1.2 km	MPC · JPL
520612	2014 OM_{412}	—	November 12, 2010	Mount Lemmon	Mount Lemmon Survey	·	1.5 km	MPC · JPL
520613	2014 ON_{412}	—	January 18, 2012	Mount Lemmon	Mount Lemmon Survey	·	1.4 km	MPC · JPL
520614	2014 OO_{412}	—	February 8, 2008	Kitt Peak	Spacewatch	·	1.6 km	MPC · JPL
520615	2014 OQ_{412}	—	October 29, 2010	Mount Lemmon	Mount Lemmon Survey	·	1.2 km	MPC · JPL
520616	2014 OR_{412}	—	February 28, 2012	Haleakala	Pan-STARRS 1	EOS	1.7 km	MPC · JPL
520617	2014 OU_{412}	—	March 12, 2013	Catalina	CSS	·	1.3 km	MPC · JPL
520618	2014 OA_{413}	—	July 29, 2014	Haleakala	Pan-STARRS 1	EOS	1.5 km	MPC · JPL
520619	2014 OB_{413}	—	October 7, 2004	Kitt Peak	Spacewatch	·	2.5 km	MPC · JPL
520620	2014 OC_{413}	—	September 12, 2010	Kitt Peak	Spacewatch	·	1.8 km	MPC · JPL
520621	2014 OK_{413}	—	August 18, 2009	Kitt Peak	Spacewatch	·	1.7 km	MPC · JPL
520622	2014 OS_{413}	—	July 30, 2014	Haleakala	Pan-STARRS 1	·	2.6 km	MPC · JPL
520623	2014 OD_{414}	—	August 28, 2009	Kitt Peak	Spacewatch	·	1.9 km	MPC · JPL
520624	2014 OE_{414}	—	October 11, 2010	Mount Lemmon	Mount Lemmon Survey	·	1.3 km	MPC · JPL
520625	2014 OJ_{414}	—	April 22, 2009	Mount Lemmon	Mount Lemmon Survey	·	1.2 km	MPC · JPL
520626	2014 OM_{414}	—	July 31, 2014	Haleakala	Pan-STARRS 1	·	1.1 km	MPC · JPL
520627	2014 OW_{414}	—	December 5, 2010	Mount Lemmon	Mount Lemmon Survey	·	3.3 km	MPC · JPL
520628	2014 OY_{414}	—	April 7, 2013	Kitt Peak	Spacewatch	·	1.3 km	MPC · JPL
520629	2014 OB_{415}	—	April 22, 2013	Mount Lemmon	Mount Lemmon Survey	·	1.7 km	MPC · JPL
520630	2014 OC_{415}	—	December 4, 2005	Kitt Peak	Spacewatch	·	1.9 km	MPC · JPL
520631	2014 PW_{12}	—	December 6, 2005	Kitt Peak	Spacewatch	·	2.4 km	MPC · JPL
520632	2014 PT_{67}	—	May 7, 2014	Haleakala	Pan-STARRS 1	·	1.8 km	MPC · JPL
520633	2014 PS_{72}	—	January 19, 2012	Haleakala	Pan-STARRS 1	EOS	1.2 km	MPC · JPL
520634	2014 PZ_{72}	—	May 12, 2013	Mount Lemmon	Mount Lemmon Survey	·	1.7 km	MPC · JPL
520635	2014 PE_{73}	—	February 3, 2012	Haleakala	Pan-STARRS 1	KOR	1.4 km	MPC · JPL
520636	2014 PC_{74}	—	February 15, 2012	Haleakala	Pan-STARRS 1	KOR	1.1 km	MPC · JPL
520637	2014 PM_{74}	—	March 26, 2009	Kitt Peak	Spacewatch	·	1.3 km	MPC · JPL
520638	2014 PU_{74}	—	August 3, 2014	Haleakala	Pan-STARRS 1	VER	2.1 km	MPC · JPL
520639	2014 PC_{75}	—	March 3, 2005	Kitt Peak	Spacewatch	·	1.3 km	MPC · JPL
520640	2014 PK_{76}	—	September 26, 2006	Kitt Peak	Spacewatch	·	900 m	MPC · JPL
520641	2014 PQ_{76}	—	August 3, 2014	Haleakala	Pan-STARRS 1	·	2.0 km	MPC · JPL
520642	2014 PU_{76}	—	January 30, 2011	Mount Lemmon	Mount Lemmon Survey	·	2.5 km	MPC · JPL
520643	2014 PX_{76}	—	January 3, 2012	Kitt Peak	Spacewatch	·	1.9 km	MPC · JPL
520644	2014 PD_{77}	—	August 17, 2009	Kitt Peak	Spacewatch	KOR	1.6 km	MPC · JPL
520645	2014 PL_{77}	—	August 28, 2009	Kitt Peak	Spacewatch	·	1.4 km	MPC · JPL
520646	2014 PM_{77}	—	August 29, 2005	Kitt Peak	Spacewatch	WIT	1.0 km	MPC · JPL
520647	2014 PN_{77}	—	March 13, 2012	Kitt Peak	Spacewatch	·	2.3 km	MPC · JPL
520648	2014 PQ_{77}	—	February 10, 2008	Mount Lemmon	Mount Lemmon Survey	·	1.5 km	MPC · JPL
520649	2014 PX_{77}	—	November 11, 2006	Kitt Peak	Spacewatch	·	1.4 km	MPC · JPL
520650	2014 PY_{77}	—	December 21, 2006	Kitt Peak	Spacewatch	·	2.0 km	MPC · JPL
520651	2014 PZ_{77}	—	July 7, 2005	Kitt Peak	Spacewatch	·	1.4 km	MPC · JPL
520652	2014 PB_{78}	—	April 15, 2012	Haleakala	Pan-STARRS 1	EOS	2.0 km	MPC · JPL
520653	2014 PJ_{78}	—	December 27, 2006	Mount Lemmon	Mount Lemmon Survey	·	1.6 km	MPC · JPL
520654	2014 QC_{55}	—	April 28, 2009	Kitt Peak	Spacewatch	·	1.3 km	MPC · JPL
520655	2014 QW_{149}	—	March 11, 2007	Mount Lemmon	Mount Lemmon Survey	EOS	1.5 km	MPC · JPL
520656	2014 QG_{214}	—	January 19, 2012	Haleakala	Pan-STARRS 1	·	2.0 km	MPC · JPL
520657	2014 QO_{254}	—	January 14, 2011	Kitt Peak	Spacewatch	·	3.4 km	MPC · JPL
520658	2014 QH_{274}	—	July 30, 2008	Mount Lemmon	Mount Lemmon Survey	·	3.2 km	MPC · JPL
520659	2014 QY_{277}	—	March 7, 2013	Kitt Peak	Spacewatch	MRX	890 m	MPC · JPL
520660	2014 QY_{336}	—	September 21, 2009	Mount Lemmon	Mount Lemmon Survey	·	1.6 km	MPC · JPL
520661	2014 QK_{381}	—	March 15, 2013	Kitt Peak	Spacewatch	·	2.1 km	MPC · JPL
520662	2014 QG_{387}	—	August 29, 2014	Haleakala	Pan-STARRS 1	·	2.0 km	MPC · JPL
520663	2014 QN_{398}	—	August 30, 2008	Socorro	LINEAR	·	3.3 km	MPC · JPL
520664	2014 QM_{435}	—	September 23, 2005	Kitt Peak	Spacewatch	MRX	900 m	MPC · JPL
520665	2014 QL_{438}	—	August 31, 2014	Haleakala	Pan-STARRS 1	·	3.3 km	MPC · JPL
520666	2014 QB_{448}	—	January 27, 2007	Kitt Peak	Spacewatch	KOR	1.2 km	MPC · JPL
520667	2014 QP_{448}	—	October 30, 2005	Catalina	CSS	DOR	2.2 km	MPC · JPL
520668	2014 QC_{449}	—	September 6, 2008	Mount Lemmon	Mount Lemmon Survey	·	2.4 km	MPC · JPL
520669	2014 QN_{450}	—	April 22, 2007	Mount Lemmon	Mount Lemmon Survey	·	2.6 km	MPC · JPL
520670	2014 QO_{450}	—	March 4, 2012	Mount Lemmon	Mount Lemmon Survey	·	1.9 km	MPC · JPL
520671	2014 QU_{450}	—	March 25, 2007	Mount Lemmon	Mount Lemmon Survey	·	2.9 km	MPC · JPL
520672	2014 QQ_{453}	—	November 13, 2010	Mount Lemmon	Mount Lemmon Survey	·	2.4 km	MPC · JPL
520673	2014 QO_{456}	—	April 22, 2007	Kitt Peak	Spacewatch	·	3.2 km	MPC · JPL
520674	2014 QY_{456}	—	March 17, 2012	Mount Lemmon	Mount Lemmon Survey	EOS	2.0 km	MPC · JPL
520675	2014 QS_{457}	—	November 10, 2009	Kitt Peak	Spacewatch	·	3.0 km	MPC · JPL
520676	2014 QX_{457}	—	September 14, 2009	Kitt Peak	Spacewatch	·	1.9 km	MPC · JPL
520677	2014 QF_{458}	—	October 31, 2010	Mount Lemmon	Mount Lemmon Survey	·	1.5 km	MPC · JPL
520678	2014 QG_{458}	—	January 13, 2011	Kitt Peak	Spacewatch	·	2.3 km	MPC · JPL
520679	2014 QM_{458}	—	March 12, 2007	Kitt Peak	Spacewatch	·	2.0 km	MPC · JPL
520680	2014 QV_{458}	—	September 17, 2009	Mount Lemmon	Mount Lemmon Survey	·	2.4 km	MPC · JPL
520681	2014 QA_{459}	—	December 29, 2011	Kitt Peak	Spacewatch	·	2.3 km	MPC · JPL
520682	2014 QE_{459}	—	April 13, 2013	Haleakala	Pan-STARRS 1	EOS	1.4 km	MPC · JPL
520683	2014 QJ_{459}	—	March 15, 2013	Mount Lemmon	Mount Lemmon Survey	·	1.5 km	MPC · JPL
520684	2014 QZ_{459}	—	March 23, 2012	Mount Lemmon	Mount Lemmon Survey	·	1.9 km	MPC · JPL
520685	2014 QR_{460}	—	February 22, 2007	Kitt Peak	Spacewatch	KOR	1.3 km	MPC · JPL
520686	2014 QA_{461}	—	September 19, 2009	Kitt Peak	Spacewatch	·	2.0 km	MPC · JPL
520687	2014 QJ_{461}	—	November 11, 2006	Kitt Peak	Spacewatch	(5)	1.4 km	MPC · JPL
520688	2014 QP_{461}	—	August 18, 2009	Kitt Peak	Spacewatch	TRE	2.2 km	MPC · JPL
520689	2014 QQ_{461}	—	March 15, 2008	Kitt Peak	Spacewatch	·	1.4 km	MPC · JPL
520690	2014 QU_{461}	—	September 29, 2009	Mount Lemmon	Mount Lemmon Survey	EOS	2.6 km	MPC · JPL
520691	2014 QW_{461}	—	March 16, 2012	Haleakala	Pan-STARRS 1	EOS	2.1 km	MPC · JPL
520692	2014 QY_{461}	—	May 12, 2013	Haleakala	Pan-STARRS 1	BRA	1.4 km	MPC · JPL
520693	2014 QT_{462}	—	March 12, 2007	Kitt Peak	Spacewatch	·	1.5 km	MPC · JPL
520694	2014 QY_{462}	—	January 31, 2006	Kitt Peak	Spacewatch	·	1.7 km	MPC · JPL
520695	2014 QG_{463}	—	March 29, 2012	Haleakala	Pan-STARRS 1	·	2.9 km	MPC · JPL
520696	2014 QL_{463}	—	May 13, 2007	Kitt Peak	Spacewatch	·	2.8 km	MPC · JPL
520697	2014 QT_{464}	—	August 23, 2014	Haleakala	Pan-STARRS 1	·	2.7 km	MPC · JPL
520698	2014 QV_{464}	—	September 29, 2009	Mount Lemmon	Mount Lemmon Survey	·	3.1 km	MPC · JPL
520699	2014 QX_{465}	—	February 28, 2012	Haleakala	Pan-STARRS 1	·	2.4 km	MPC · JPL
520700	2014 QZ_{465}	—	September 3, 2008	Kitt Peak	Spacewatch	·	2.9 km	MPC · JPL

== 520701–520800 ==
back to top

Designation			Discovery			Properties		Ref
Permanent	Provisional	Named after	Date	Site	Discoverer(s)	Category	Diam.	Ref
520701	2014 QE_{466}	—	April 22, 2007	Kitt Peak	Spacewatch	THM	2.2 km	MPC · JPL
520702	2014 QF_{466}	—	January 3, 2012	Mount Lemmon	Mount Lemmon Survey	·	1.1 km	MPC · JPL
520703	2014 QG_{466}	—	March 2, 2011	Mount Lemmon	Mount Lemmon Survey	·	2.2 km	MPC · JPL
520704	2014 QH_{466}	—	March 11, 2007	Kitt Peak	Spacewatch	·	2.2 km	MPC · JPL
520705	2014 QK_{466}	—	March 16, 2007	Mount Lemmon	Mount Lemmon Survey	LIX	3.1 km	MPC · JPL
520706	2014 QQ_{466}	—	March 4, 2008	Mount Lemmon	Mount Lemmon Survey	·	1.2 km	MPC · JPL
520707	2014 QU_{466}	—	February 27, 2008	Kitt Peak	Spacewatch	·	1.6 km	MPC · JPL
520708	2014 QZ_{466}	—	August 25, 2014	Haleakala	Pan-STARRS 1	·	2.4 km	MPC · JPL
520709	2014 QF_{467}	—	February 25, 2011	Mount Lemmon	Mount Lemmon Survey	·	2.7 km	MPC · JPL
520710	2014 QL_{467}	—	May 11, 2005	Kitt Peak	Spacewatch	EUN	1.2 km	MPC · JPL
520711	2014 QM_{467}	—	August 26, 2014	Haleakala	Pan-STARRS 1	·	2.4 km	MPC · JPL
520712	2014 QO_{467}	—	May 4, 2009	Mount Lemmon	Mount Lemmon Survey	·	820 m	MPC · JPL
520713	2014 QS_{467}	—	March 24, 2012	Kitt Peak	Spacewatch	·	2.1 km	MPC · JPL
520714	2014 QG_{468}	—	January 13, 2011	Mount Lemmon	Mount Lemmon Survey	·	2.4 km	MPC · JPL
520715	2014 QO_{468}	—	March 2, 2006	Kitt Peak	Spacewatch	·	2.8 km	MPC · JPL
520716	2014 QS_{468}	—	November 14, 2010	Kitt Peak	Spacewatch	·	1.6 km	MPC · JPL
520717	2014 QV_{468}	—	October 27, 2005	Mount Lemmon	Mount Lemmon Survey	·	1.4 km	MPC · JPL
520718	2014 QC_{469}	—	March 9, 2011	Mount Lemmon	Mount Lemmon Survey	·	2.7 km	MPC · JPL
520719	2014 QD_{469}	—	March 15, 2007	Mount Lemmon	Mount Lemmon Survey	EOS	1.9 km	MPC · JPL
520720	2014 QE_{469}	—	February 10, 2008	Kitt Peak	Spacewatch	·	1.6 km	MPC · JPL
520721	2014 QF_{469}	—	October 2, 2010	Mount Lemmon	Mount Lemmon Survey	EUN	1.2 km	MPC · JPL
520722	2014 QG_{469}	—	August 27, 2014	Haleakala	Pan-STARRS 1	·	1.5 km	MPC · JPL
520723	2014 QN_{469}	—	January 17, 2007	Catalina	CSS	GEF	1.1 km	MPC · JPL
520724	2014 QX_{469}	—	November 15, 2006	Mount Lemmon	Mount Lemmon Survey	·	1.8 km	MPC · JPL
520725	2014 QF_{470}	—	December 25, 2005	Kitt Peak	Spacewatch	HYG	2.4 km	MPC · JPL
520726	2014 QG_{470}	—	March 6, 2008	Mount Lemmon	Mount Lemmon Survey	·	1.5 km	MPC · JPL
520727	2014 QX_{470}	—	December 3, 2010	Mount Lemmon	Mount Lemmon Survey	·	2.2 km	MPC · JPL
520728	2014 QJ_{471}	—	March 29, 2012	Haleakala	Pan-STARRS 1	EUN	1.2 km	MPC · JPL
520729	2014 QT_{471}	—	August 30, 2014	Haleakala	Pan-STARRS 1	·	2.0 km	MPC · JPL
520730	2014 QW_{471}	—	August 30, 2014	Haleakala	Pan-STARRS 1	·	2.2 km	MPC · JPL
520731	2014 QX_{471}	—	October 2, 2010	Mount Lemmon	Mount Lemmon Survey	EUN	920 m	MPC · JPL
520732	2014 QE_{472}	—	November 12, 2010	Mount Lemmon	Mount Lemmon Survey	·	1.4 km	MPC · JPL
520733	2014 QM_{472}	—	December 1, 2006	Mount Lemmon	Mount Lemmon Survey	·	2.1 km	MPC · JPL
520734	2014 QN_{472}	—	May 3, 2008	Mount Lemmon	Mount Lemmon Survey	·	1.7 km	MPC · JPL
520735	2014 QV_{472}	—	March 13, 2007	Kitt Peak	Spacewatch	·	2.1 km	MPC · JPL
520736	2014 QN_{473}	—	February 25, 2011	Mount Lemmon	Mount Lemmon Survey	EOS	1.8 km	MPC · JPL
520737	2014 QV_{473}	—	July 29, 2008	Kitt Peak	Spacewatch	EOS	1.7 km	MPC · JPL
520738	2014 QW_{473}	—	August 31, 2014	Haleakala	Pan-STARRS 1	·	1.4 km	MPC · JPL
520739	2014 QZ_{473}	—	August 31, 2014	Haleakala	Pan-STARRS 1	·	2.2 km	MPC · JPL
520740	2014 QB_{474}	—	August 28, 2009	Kitt Peak	Spacewatch	·	2.1 km	MPC · JPL
520741	2014 QD_{474}	—	April 29, 2012	Kitt Peak	Spacewatch	·	2.7 km	MPC · JPL
520742	2014 QE_{474}	—	November 26, 2009	Kitt Peak	Spacewatch	·	2.0 km	MPC · JPL
520743	2014 QJ_{474}	—	March 27, 2012	Kitt Peak	Spacewatch	·	3.0 km	MPC · JPL
520744	2014 QK_{474}	—	September 22, 2009	Mount Lemmon	Mount Lemmon Survey	KOR	1.3 km	MPC · JPL
520745	2014 QL_{474}	—	December 27, 2005	Kitt Peak	Spacewatch	·	1.8 km	MPC · JPL
520746	2014 QR_{474}	—	December 16, 2006	Mount Lemmon	Mount Lemmon Survey	·	1.5 km	MPC · JPL
520747	2014 RM_{10}	—	September 15, 2009	Kitt Peak	Spacewatch	·	1.9 km	MPC · JPL
520748	2014 RH_{59}	—	January 29, 2011	Mount Lemmon	Mount Lemmon Survey	·	2.1 km	MPC · JPL
520749	2014 RF_{65}	—	December 5, 2010	Mount Lemmon	Mount Lemmon Survey	·	3.0 km	MPC · JPL
520750	2014 RD_{66}	—	August 23, 2008	Siding Spring	SSS	·	2.4 km	MPC · JPL
520751	2014 RY_{66}	—	August 31, 2014	Catalina	CSS	·	1.6 km	MPC · JPL
520752	2014 RG_{67}	—	March 24, 2012	Kitt Peak	Spacewatch	EOS	1.7 km	MPC · JPL
520753	2014 RS_{67}	—	October 11, 2010	Mount Lemmon	Mount Lemmon Survey	·	2.2 km	MPC · JPL
520754	2014 RE_{68}	—	August 18, 2009	Kitt Peak	Spacewatch	·	1.9 km	MPC · JPL
520755	2014 RH_{68}	—	December 6, 2010	Mount Lemmon	Mount Lemmon Survey	·	2.0 km	MPC · JPL
520756	2014 RK_{68}	—	September 22, 2009	Catalina	CSS	·	3.1 km	MPC · JPL
520757	2014 RN_{68}	—	August 24, 2008	Kitt Peak	Spacewatch	·	2.2 km	MPC · JPL
520758	2014 RP_{68}	—	April 21, 2012	Haleakala	Pan-STARRS 1	EOS	2.0 km	MPC · JPL
520759	2014 RS_{68}	—	November 10, 2009	Kitt Peak	Spacewatch	EOS	2.1 km	MPC · JPL
520760	2014 RW_{68}	—	August 9, 2013	Haleakala	Pan-STARRS 1	·	2.1 km	MPC · JPL
520761	2014 RY_{68}	—	March 22, 2012	Mount Lemmon	Mount Lemmon Survey	EOS	1.8 km	MPC · JPL
520762	2014 RA_{69}	—	March 14, 2012	Haleakala	Pan-STARRS 1	PHO	1.1 km	MPC · JPL
520763	2014 RE_{69}	—	August 29, 2005	Kitt Peak	Spacewatch	·	2.0 km	MPC · JPL
520764	2014 RM_{69}	—	August 29, 2014	Mount Lemmon	Mount Lemmon Survey	EOS	1.9 km	MPC · JPL
520765	2014 RN_{69}	—	October 25, 2005	Kitt Peak	Spacewatch	·	1.8 km	MPC · JPL
520766	2014 RV_{69}	—	December 19, 2009	Kitt Peak	Spacewatch	·	2.8 km	MPC · JPL
520767	2014 SJ_{31}	—	February 25, 2006	Kitt Peak	Spacewatch	·	2.3 km	MPC · JPL
520768	2014 SM_{79}	—	September 24, 2009	Mount Lemmon	Mount Lemmon Survey	·	2.6 km	MPC · JPL
520769	2014 SQ_{118}	—	August 7, 2008	Kitt Peak	Spacewatch	·	2.5 km	MPC · JPL
520770	2014 SW_{134}	—	February 26, 2012	Mount Lemmon	Mount Lemmon Survey	EOS	2.1 km	MPC · JPL
520771	2014 SU_{145}	—	March 25, 2012	Mount Lemmon	Mount Lemmon Survey	·	2.2 km	MPC · JPL
520772	2014 SN_{157}	—	October 25, 2009	Kitt Peak	Spacewatch	·	2.2 km	MPC · JPL
520773	2014 SZ_{173}	—	October 23, 2008	Kitt Peak	Spacewatch	·	650 m	MPC · JPL
520774	2014 SE_{231}	—	October 24, 2003	Kitt Peak	Spacewatch	·	3.2 km	MPC · JPL
520775	2014 SR_{300}	—	September 29, 2008	Catalina	CSS	·	3.6 km	MPC · JPL
520776	2014 SJ_{322}	—	January 14, 2011	Mount Lemmon	Mount Lemmon Survey	·	2.3 km	MPC · JPL
520777	2014 SF_{335}	—	February 7, 2011	Mount Lemmon	Mount Lemmon Survey	·	2.8 km	MPC · JPL
520778	2014 SB_{355}	—	June 18, 2013	Haleakala	Pan-STARRS 1	HYG	2.4 km	MPC · JPL
520779	2014 SM_{355}	—	October 29, 2003	Kitt Peak	Spacewatch	·	3.3 km	MPC · JPL
520780	2014 SV_{356}	—	May 29, 2009	Mount Lemmon	Mount Lemmon Survey	·	2.0 km	MPC · JPL
520781	2014 SD_{357}	—	October 20, 2006	Kitt Peak	Spacewatch	·	1.1 km	MPC · JPL
520782	2014 SG_{357}	—	March 27, 2012	Kitt Peak	Spacewatch	·	2.9 km	MPC · JPL
520783	2014 SJ_{357}	—	June 30, 2013	Haleakala	Pan-STARRS 1	·	2.6 km	MPC · JPL
520784	2014 SO_{357}	—	September 18, 2014	Haleakala	Pan-STARRS 1	·	2.0 km	MPC · JPL
520785	2014 SQ_{357}	—	July 2, 2013	Haleakala	Pan-STARRS 1	·	2.4 km	MPC · JPL
520786	2014 SR_{357}	—	May 8, 2008	Kitt Peak	Spacewatch	·	1.6 km	MPC · JPL
520787	2014 SX_{357}	—	April 6, 2008	Mount Lemmon	Mount Lemmon Survey	·	1.4 km	MPC · JPL
520788	2014 SG_{358}	—	November 22, 2009	Kitt Peak	Spacewatch	·	2.7 km	MPC · JPL
520789	2014 SS_{358}	—	November 30, 2005	Kitt Peak	Spacewatch	·	1.4 km	MPC · JPL
520790	2014 SU_{358}	—	April 1, 2012	Mount Lemmon	Mount Lemmon Survey	·	3.0 km	MPC · JPL
520791	2014 SD_{359}	—	October 25, 2005	Kitt Peak	Spacewatch	HOF	2.7 km	MPC · JPL
520792	2014 SO_{359}	—	September 23, 2005	Kitt Peak	Spacewatch	·	1.9 km	MPC · JPL
520793	2014 ST_{359}	—	December 8, 2005	Kitt Peak	Spacewatch	KOR	1.5 km	MPC · JPL
520794	2014 SZ_{359}	—	November 1, 2010	Catalina	CSS	MAR	980 m	MPC · JPL
520795	2014 ST_{360}	—	February 11, 2011	Mount Lemmon	Mount Lemmon Survey	·	1.9 km	MPC · JPL
520796	2014 SW_{360}	—	September 20, 2014	Haleakala	Pan-STARRS 1	·	2.2 km	MPC · JPL
520797	2014 SB_{361}	—	July 30, 2008	Mount Lemmon	Mount Lemmon Survey	EOS	1.7 km	MPC · JPL
520798	2014 SM_{361}	—	December 2, 2010	Mount Lemmon	Mount Lemmon Survey	·	1.6 km	MPC · JPL
520799	2014 SH_{362}	—	June 18, 2013	Haleakala	Pan-STARRS 1	·	2.9 km	MPC · JPL
520800	2014 SK_{362}	—	March 22, 2012	Catalina	CSS	·	2.9 km	MPC · JPL

== 520801–520900 ==
back to top

Designation			Discovery			Properties		Ref
Permanent	Provisional	Named after	Date	Site	Discoverer(s)	Category	Diam.	Ref
520801	2014 SM_{362}	—	October 25, 2005	Catalina	CSS	·	2.7 km	MPC · JPL
520802	2014 SP_{362}	—	November 12, 2010	Mount Lemmon	Mount Lemmon Survey	·	1.5 km	MPC · JPL
520803	2014 SA_{363}	—	November 17, 2006	Kitt Peak	Spacewatch	MAR	1.1 km	MPC · JPL
520804	2014 SG_{363}	—	November 18, 2006	Kitt Peak	Spacewatch	·	1.7 km	MPC · JPL
520805	2014 TX_{29}	—	November 19, 2003	Kitt Peak	Spacewatch	·	3.8 km	MPC · JPL
520806	2014 TK_{42}	—	September 21, 2008	Mount Lemmon	Mount Lemmon Survey	·	2.2 km	MPC · JPL
520807	2014 TD_{63}	—	December 28, 2005	Kitt Peak	Spacewatch	KOR	1.4 km	MPC · JPL
520808	2014 TF_{64}	—	October 5, 2014	WISE	WISE	APO	700 m	MPC · JPL
520809	2014 TK_{87}	—	October 3, 2014	Haleakala	Pan-STARRS 1	·	3.5 km	MPC · JPL
520810	2014 TQ_{90}	—	September 6, 2008	Kitt Peak	Spacewatch	·	3.1 km	MPC · JPL
520811	2014 TP_{91}	—	February 3, 2009	Kitt Peak	Spacewatch	·	920 m	MPC · JPL
520812	2014 TA_{92}	—	March 27, 2011	Mount Lemmon	Mount Lemmon Survey	·	2.6 km	MPC · JPL
520813	2014 TB_{92}	—	October 18, 2009	Mount Lemmon	Mount Lemmon Survey	·	1.6 km	MPC · JPL
520814	2014 TG_{92}	—	September 4, 2008	Kitt Peak	Spacewatch	VER	2.4 km	MPC · JPL
520815	2014 TL_{92}	—	July 15, 2013	Haleakala	Pan-STARRS 1	·	2.7 km	MPC · JPL
520816	2014 TP_{92}	—	September 21, 2009	Kitt Peak	Spacewatch	·	1.8 km	MPC · JPL
520817	2014 TD_{93}	—	July 12, 2013	Haleakala	Pan-STARRS 1	·	1.6 km	MPC · JPL
520818	2014 TH_{93}	—	October 3, 2014	Kitt Peak	Spacewatch	WIT	1.0 km	MPC · JPL
520819	2014 TQ_{94}	—	March 2, 2011	Kitt Peak	Spacewatch	·	2.9 km	MPC · JPL
520820	2014 TW_{94}	—	November 17, 2006	Kitt Peak	Spacewatch	·	1.6 km	MPC · JPL
520821	2014 TE_{95}	—	September 2, 2008	Kitt Peak	Spacewatch	·	2.1 km	MPC · JPL
520822	2014 UJ_{8}	—	December 16, 2003	Kitt Peak	Spacewatch	·	5.1 km	MPC · JPL
520823	2014 UQ_{118}	—	September 26, 2014	Catalina	CSS	·	1.7 km	MPC · JPL
520824	2014 UQ_{201}	—	August 3, 2008	Siding Spring	SSS	·	3.1 km	MPC · JPL
520825	2014 UB_{216}	—	September 27, 2003	Anderson Mesa	LONEOS	·	3.0 km	MPC · JPL
520826	2014 UH_{216}	—	September 18, 2014	Haleakala	Pan-STARRS 1	·	3.1 km	MPC · JPL
520827	2014 UU_{216}	—	February 26, 2007	Kitt Peak	Spacewatch	EUP	4.1 km	MPC · JPL
520828	2014 UU_{232}	—	October 1, 2003	Kitt Peak	Spacewatch	·	2.4 km	MPC · JPL
520829	2014 UC_{234}	—	March 2, 2006	Kitt Peak	Spacewatch	·	2.0 km	MPC · JPL
520830	2014 UD_{234}	—	September 28, 2008	Mount Lemmon	Mount Lemmon Survey	·	2.3 km	MPC · JPL
520831	2014 UN_{234}	—	October 21, 2014	Mount Lemmon	Mount Lemmon Survey	·	1.9 km	MPC · JPL
520832	2014 UP_{234}	—	December 19, 2009	Mount Lemmon	Mount Lemmon Survey	·	1.9 km	MPC · JPL
520833	2014 UT_{234}	—	March 11, 2007	Kitt Peak	Spacewatch	·	1.9 km	MPC · JPL
520834	2014 UU_{234}	—	November 14, 2006	Kitt Peak	Spacewatch	·	1.1 km	MPC · JPL
520835	2014 UA_{235}	—	November 24, 2009	Kitt Peak	Spacewatch	·	1.7 km	MPC · JPL
520836	2014 UB_{235}	—	August 18, 2009	Kitt Peak	Spacewatch	AGN	930 m	MPC · JPL
520837	2014 UK_{235}	—	September 4, 2008	Kitt Peak	Spacewatch	·	2.2 km	MPC · JPL
520838	2014 UN_{235}	—	November 12, 2010	Mount Lemmon	Mount Lemmon Survey	·	960 m	MPC · JPL
520839	2014 UU_{235}	—	November 22, 2009	Kitt Peak	Spacewatch	·	1.4 km	MPC · JPL
520840	2014 UF_{236}	—	October 25, 2014	Haleakala	Pan-STARRS 1	·	2.2 km	MPC · JPL
520841	2014 UT_{236}	—	October 26, 2014	Mount Lemmon	Mount Lemmon Survey	·	730 m	MPC · JPL
520842	2014 UQ_{237}	—	December 30, 2011	Kitt Peak	Spacewatch	(2076)	610 m	MPC · JPL
520843	2014 UX_{237}	—	October 28, 2014	Haleakala	Pan-STARRS 1	·	3.0 km	MPC · JPL
520844	2014 UZ_{237}	—	March 26, 2011	Mount Lemmon	Mount Lemmon Survey	·	2.9 km	MPC · JPL
520845	2014 UA_{238}	—	February 25, 2007	Mount Lemmon	Mount Lemmon Survey	·	1.7 km	MPC · JPL
520846	2014 UC_{238}	—	January 16, 2007	Catalina	CSS	·	1.2 km	MPC · JPL
520847	2014 UP_{238}	—	July 16, 2013	Haleakala	Pan-STARRS 1	EOS	1.5 km	MPC · JPL
520848	2014 UW_{238}	—	July 28, 2009	Kitt Peak	Spacewatch	·	1.4 km	MPC · JPL
520849	2014 UX_{238}	—	June 19, 2013	Mount Lemmon	Mount Lemmon Survey	EOS	1.9 km	MPC · JPL
520850	2014 UC_{239}	—	December 19, 2003	Kitt Peak	Spacewatch	·	3.7 km	MPC · JPL
520851	2014 UD_{239}	—	February 11, 2011	Mount Lemmon	Mount Lemmon Survey	·	2.4 km	MPC · JPL
520852	2014 UM_{239}	—	February 12, 2011	Mount Lemmon	Mount Lemmon Survey	·	2.7 km	MPC · JPL
520853	2014 UN_{239}	—	October 29, 2014	Haleakala	Pan-STARRS 1	·	3.6 km	MPC · JPL
520854	2014 UZ_{239}	—	February 24, 2010	WISE	WISE	·	1.9 km	MPC · JPL
520855	2014 UD_{240}	—	January 14, 2011	Mount Lemmon	Mount Lemmon Survey	·	2.2 km	MPC · JPL
520856	2014 UO_{240}	—	October 30, 2014	Haleakala	Pan-STARRS 1	·	2.4 km	MPC · JPL
520857	2014 UQ_{240}	—	February 10, 2011	Mount Lemmon	Mount Lemmon Survey	·	2.4 km	MPC · JPL
520858	2014 US_{240}	—	October 1, 2010	Kitt Peak	Spacewatch	·	800 m	MPC · JPL
520859	2014 VY	—	November 23, 1997	Kitt Peak	Spacewatch	·	3.1 km	MPC · JPL
520860	2014 VZ_{6}	—	November 30, 2003	Kitt Peak	Spacewatch	·	3.3 km	MPC · JPL
520861	2014 VE_{39}	—	October 27, 2005	Catalina	CSS	GAL	1.6 km	MPC · JPL
520862	2014 WG_{7}	—	November 17, 2014	Mount Lemmon	Mount Lemmon Survey	AMO	250 m	MPC · JPL
520863	2014 WB_{70}	—	November 10, 2010	Haleakala	Pan-STARRS 1	·	1.6 km	MPC · JPL
520864	2014 WC_{90}	—	April 29, 2012	Mount Lemmon	Mount Lemmon Survey	·	1.7 km	MPC · JPL
520865	2014 WG_{92}	—	June 22, 2007	Kitt Peak	Spacewatch	·	2.5 km	MPC · JPL
520866	2014 WO_{101}	—	September 20, 2014	Haleakala	Pan-STARRS 1	·	2.5 km	MPC · JPL
520867	2014 WB_{105}	—	October 7, 2004	Kitt Peak	Spacewatch	·	1.8 km	MPC · JPL
520868	2014 WS_{124}	—	November 16, 2014	Mount Lemmon	Mount Lemmon Survey	EOS	2.3 km	MPC · JPL
520869	2014 WJ_{162}	—	July 16, 2013	Haleakala	Pan-STARRS 1	·	2.4 km	MPC · JPL
520870	2014 WB_{177}	—	April 7, 2007	Mount Lemmon	Mount Lemmon Survey	EOS	1.5 km	MPC · JPL
520871	2014 WO_{207}	—	October 30, 2005	Kitt Peak	Spacewatch	·	1.6 km	MPC · JPL
520872	2014 WP_{233}	—	October 16, 2009	Catalina	CSS	·	2.5 km	MPC · JPL
520873	2014 WY_{277}	—	April 25, 2007	Mount Lemmon	Mount Lemmon Survey	·	2.8 km	MPC · JPL
520874	2014 WG_{299}	—	November 16, 2006	Kitt Peak	Spacewatch	EUN	1.3 km	MPC · JPL
520875	2014 WV_{311}	—	September 17, 2009	Mount Lemmon	Mount Lemmon Survey	·	1.6 km	MPC · JPL
520876	2014 WS_{413}	—	September 6, 2008	Catalina	CSS	·	3.2 km	MPC · JPL
520877	2014 WP_{497}	—	October 18, 2009	Mount Lemmon	Mount Lemmon Survey	KOR	1.1 km	MPC · JPL
520878	2014 WS_{500}	—	September 6, 2014	Mount Lemmon	Mount Lemmon Survey	·	3.2 km	MPC · JPL
520879	2014 WN_{501}	—	March 31, 2010	WISE	WISE	·	3.8 km	MPC · JPL
520880	2014 WV_{503}	—	September 29, 2005	Kitt Peak	Spacewatch	·	1.9 km	MPC · JPL
520881	2014 WO_{518}	—	February 28, 2012	Haleakala	Pan-STARRS 1	·	960 m	MPC · JPL
520882	2014 WR_{522}	—	December 16, 2009	Mount Lemmon	Mount Lemmon Survey	T_{j} (2.97) · EUP	3.8 km	MPC · JPL
520883	2014 WV_{522}	—	June 18, 2013	Haleakala	Pan-STARRS 1	·	1.4 km	MPC · JPL
520884	2014 WB_{523}	—	March 16, 2007	Mount Lemmon	Mount Lemmon Survey	·	1.3 km	MPC · JPL
520885	2014 WE_{523}	—	February 8, 2011	Mount Lemmon	Mount Lemmon Survey	KOR	1.1 km	MPC · JPL
520886	2014 WQ_{523}	—	March 17, 2012	Mount Lemmon	Mount Lemmon Survey	·	920 m	MPC · JPL
520887	2014 WG_{524}	—	December 13, 2006	Kitt Peak	Spacewatch	·	1.4 km	MPC · JPL
520888	2014 WH_{524}	—	October 14, 2010	Mount Lemmon	Mount Lemmon Survey	·	1.5 km	MPC · JPL
520889	2014 WP_{524}	—	October 12, 2007	Kitt Peak	Spacewatch	·	620 m	MPC · JPL
520890	2014 WG_{525}	—	November 20, 2014	Haleakala	Pan-STARRS 1	·	1.9 km	MPC · JPL
520891	2014 WS_{525}	—	January 28, 2011	Mount Lemmon	Mount Lemmon Survey	·	1.9 km	MPC · JPL
520892	2014 WX_{525}	—	November 20, 2014	Haleakala	Pan-STARRS 1	·	2.5 km	MPC · JPL
520893	2014 WA_{526}	—	August 9, 2013	Haleakala	Pan-STARRS 1	EUN	990 m	MPC · JPL
520894	2014 WU_{526}	—	October 13, 2010	Mount Lemmon	Mount Lemmon Survey	V	540 m	MPC · JPL
520895	2014 WX_{526}	—	August 23, 2007	Siding Spring	SSS	TIR	3.5 km	MPC · JPL
520896	2014 WA_{527}	—	February 9, 2005	Kitt Peak	Spacewatch	·	560 m	MPC · JPL
520897	2014 WD_{527}	—	November 19, 2008	Kitt Peak	Spacewatch	·	2.7 km	MPC · JPL
520898	2014 WE_{527}	—	April 29, 2011	Mount Lemmon	Mount Lemmon Survey	EOS	1.8 km	MPC · JPL
520899	2014 WN_{527}	—	August 9, 2013	Kitt Peak	Spacewatch	·	1.1 km	MPC · JPL
520900	2014 WT_{527}	—	February 7, 2008	Kitt Peak	Spacewatch	·	830 m	MPC · JPL

== 520901–521000 ==
back to top

Designation			Discovery			Properties		Ref
Permanent	Provisional	Named after	Date	Site	Discoverer(s)	Category	Diam.	Ref
520901	2014 WU_{527}	—	October 9, 2009	Catalina	CSS	·	1.6 km	MPC · JPL
520902	2014 WV_{527}	—	October 13, 2013	Kitt Peak	Spacewatch	VER	2.5 km	MPC · JPL
520903	2014 WW_{527}	—	August 9, 2013	Kitt Peak	Spacewatch	·	960 m	MPC · JPL
520904	2014 WM_{528}	—	July 14, 2013	Haleakala	Pan-STARRS 1	·	1.5 km	MPC · JPL
520905	2014 WY_{528}	—	September 22, 2008	Kitt Peak	Spacewatch	·	2.2 km	MPC · JPL
520906	2014 WE_{529}	—	March 16, 2007	Kitt Peak	Spacewatch	HNS	890 m	MPC · JPL
520907	2014 WP_{529}	—	July 14, 2013	Haleakala	Pan-STARRS 1	·	1.6 km	MPC · JPL
520908	2014 WQ_{529}	—	January 14, 2008	Kitt Peak	Spacewatch	·	840 m	MPC · JPL
520909	2014 WZ_{529}	—	October 7, 2013	Kitt Peak	Spacewatch	·	3.1 km	MPC · JPL
520910	2014 WA_{530}	—	October 10, 2008	Mount Lemmon	Mount Lemmon Survey	·	2.8 km	MPC · JPL
520911	2014 WE_{530}	—	November 24, 2014	Mount Lemmon	Mount Lemmon Survey	·	2.0 km	MPC · JPL
520912	2014 WG_{530}	—	November 24, 2014	Mount Lemmon	Mount Lemmon Survey	·	1.1 km	MPC · JPL
520913	2014 WJ_{530}	—	August 18, 2009	Kitt Peak	Spacewatch	·	1.3 km	MPC · JPL
520914	2014 WM_{530}	—	March 31, 2011	Kitt Peak	Spacewatch	·	1.7 km	MPC · JPL
520915	2014 WY_{530}	—	November 26, 2014	Haleakala	Pan-STARRS 1	·	3.3 km	MPC · JPL
520916	2014 WC_{531}	—	May 3, 2008	Kitt Peak	Spacewatch	·	950 m	MPC · JPL
520917	2014 WG_{531}	—	April 11, 2003	Kitt Peak	Spacewatch	·	1.9 km	MPC · JPL
520918	2014 WH_{531}	—	November 18, 2008	Kitt Peak	Spacewatch	·	2.6 km	MPC · JPL
520919	2014 WK_{531}	—	November 26, 2014	Haleakala	Pan-STARRS 1	·	1.4 km	MPC · JPL
520920	2014 WQ_{531}	—	February 10, 2010	Kitt Peak	Spacewatch	URS	2.7 km	MPC · JPL
520921	2014 WB_{532}	—	November 1, 2008	Mount Lemmon	Mount Lemmon Survey	·	2.2 km	MPC · JPL
520922	2014 WQ_{532}	—	September 25, 2008	Kitt Peak	Spacewatch	EOS	1.5 km	MPC · JPL
520923	2014 WV_{532}	—	December 7, 2013	Mount Lemmon	Mount Lemmon Survey	·	3.1 km	MPC · JPL
520924	2014 WW_{532}	—	April 13, 2011	Haleakala	Pan-STARRS 1	·	2.4 km	MPC · JPL
520925	2014 WL_{533}	—	February 14, 2005	Kitt Peak	Spacewatch	EOS	2.0 km	MPC · JPL
520926	2014 WS_{533}	—	March 26, 2011	Kitt Peak	Spacewatch	MAR	840 m	MPC · JPL
520927	2014 WA_{534}	—	October 12, 2010	Mount Lemmon	Mount Lemmon Survey	·	900 m	MPC · JPL
520928	2014 WD_{534}	—	October 24, 2009	Kitt Peak	Spacewatch	·	1.8 km	MPC · JPL
520929	2014 WN_{534}	—	September 15, 2009	Mount Lemmon	Mount Lemmon Survey	·	1.7 km	MPC · JPL
520930	2014 WX_{534}	—	October 25, 2008	Kitt Peak	Spacewatch	EOS	2.0 km	MPC · JPL
520931	2014 WC_{535}	—	January 30, 2010	WISE	WISE	URS	3.3 km	MPC · JPL
520932	2014 XT_{42}	—	March 11, 2005	Mount Lemmon	Mount Lemmon Survey	·	2.5 km	MPC · JPL
520933	2014 XV_{42}	—	December 25, 2009	Kitt Peak	Spacewatch	·	3.0 km	MPC · JPL
520934	2014 XY_{42}	—	October 22, 2008	Kitt Peak	Spacewatch	·	2.3 km	MPC · JPL
520935	2014 XZ_{42}	—	March 1, 2008	Kitt Peak	Spacewatch	PHO	910 m	MPC · JPL
520936	2014 XD_{43}	—	December 20, 2009	Mount Lemmon	Mount Lemmon Survey	·	1.6 km	MPC · JPL
520937	2014 XG_{43}	—	June 15, 2004	Kitt Peak	Spacewatch	MAR	1.1 km	MPC · JPL
520938	2014 XH_{43}	—	January 27, 2011	Catalina	CSS	EUN	1.3 km	MPC · JPL
520939	2014 XM_{43}	—	June 3, 2011	Mount Lemmon	Mount Lemmon Survey	EOS	2.0 km	MPC · JPL
520940	2014 XN_{43}	—	March 26, 2011	Kitt Peak	Spacewatch	·	1.7 km	MPC · JPL
520941	2014 XR_{43}	—	April 28, 2010	WISE	WISE	·	3.5 km	MPC · JPL
520942	2014 XS_{43}	—	April 9, 2008	Mount Lemmon	Mount Lemmon Survey	·	1.0 km	MPC · JPL
520943	2014 XT_{43}	—	April 21, 2009	Mount Lemmon	Mount Lemmon Survey	·	1.3 km	MPC · JPL
520944	2014 XU_{43}	—	April 22, 2007	Kitt Peak	Spacewatch	·	2.0 km	MPC · JPL
520945	2014 YJ_{2}	—	December 2, 2014	Haleakala	Pan-STARRS 1	H	520 m	MPC · JPL
520946	2014 YH_{15}	—	April 4, 2013	Haleakala	Pan-STARRS 1	H	330 m	MPC · JPL
520947	2014 YG_{16}	—	March 16, 2010	Mount Lemmon	Mount Lemmon Survey	THM	2.5 km	MPC · JPL
520948	2014 YP_{50}	—	December 20, 2014	Haleakala	Pan-STARRS 1	H	430 m	MPC · JPL
520949	2014 YA_{58}	—	October 26, 2013	Kitt Peak	Spacewatch	CYB	3.9 km	MPC · JPL
520950	2014 YL_{58}	—	March 9, 2007	Kitt Peak	Spacewatch	HNS	1.0 km	MPC · JPL
520951	2014 YO_{58}	—	September 29, 2008	Kitt Peak	Spacewatch	KOR	1.3 km	MPC · JPL
520952	2014 YQ_{58}	—	December 21, 2014	Mount Lemmon	Mount Lemmon Survey	·	1.9 km	MPC · JPL
520953	2014 YU_{58}	—	January 14, 2011	Mount Lemmon	Mount Lemmon Survey	·	1.1 km	MPC · JPL
520954	2014 YV_{58}	—	March 16, 2012	Kitt Peak	Spacewatch	·	640 m	MPC · JPL
520955	2014 YX_{58}	—	January 28, 2007	Kitt Peak	Spacewatch	·	1.6 km	MPC · JPL
520956	2014 YD_{59}	—	September 14, 2013	Haleakala	Pan-STARRS 1	·	1.6 km	MPC · JPL
520957	2014 YN_{59}	—	September 15, 2013	Mount Lemmon	Mount Lemmon Survey	EUN	1.2 km	MPC · JPL
520958	2014 YO_{59}	—	February 25, 2011	Kitt Peak	Spacewatch	HOF	2.6 km	MPC · JPL
520959	2014 YP_{59}	—	February 2, 2008	Kitt Peak	Spacewatch	·	900 m	MPC · JPL
520960	2014 YV_{59}	—	February 7, 2011	Mount Lemmon	Mount Lemmon Survey	·	1.6 km	MPC · JPL
520961	2014 YP_{60}	—	September 2, 2008	Kitt Peak	Spacewatch	KOR	1.1 km	MPC · JPL
520962	2014 YU_{60}	—	September 30, 2013	Mount Lemmon	Mount Lemmon Survey	·	1.8 km	MPC · JPL
520963	2014 YV_{60}	—	January 28, 2006	Mount Lemmon	Mount Lemmon Survey	·	1.6 km	MPC · JPL
520964	2014 YA_{61}	—	April 11, 2007	Catalina	CSS	JUN	1.1 km	MPC · JPL
520965	2014 YM_{61}	—	September 29, 2009	Mount Lemmon	Mount Lemmon Survey	·	1.5 km	MPC · JPL
520966	2014 YO_{61}	—	April 29, 2012	Kitt Peak	Spacewatch	·	2.0 km	MPC · JPL
520967	2014 YT_{61}	—	September 11, 2007	Kitt Peak	Spacewatch	·	2.7 km	MPC · JPL
520968	2014 YU_{62}	—	August 28, 2013	Catalina	CSS	·	2.0 km	MPC · JPL
520969	2014 YA_{63}	—	December 11, 2013	Haleakala	Pan-STARRS 1	·	2.5 km	MPC · JPL
520970	2014 YC_{63}	—	December 29, 2014	Haleakala	Pan-STARRS 1	EUN	1.1 km	MPC · JPL
520971	2014 YG_{63}	—	May 13, 2008	Mount Lemmon	Mount Lemmon Survey	·	1.6 km	MPC · JPL
520972	2014 YM_{63}	—	March 13, 2007	Kitt Peak	Spacewatch	·	1.6 km	MPC · JPL
520973	2014 YN_{63}	—	September 19, 2006	Kitt Peak	Spacewatch	·	3.2 km	MPC · JPL
520974	2014 YS_{63}	—	November 1, 2013	Mount Lemmon	Mount Lemmon Survey	·	1.2 km	MPC · JPL
520975	2014 YU_{63}	—	October 9, 2010	Mount Lemmon	Mount Lemmon Survey	·	640 m	MPC · JPL
520976	2015 AV_{1}	—	November 23, 2014	Haleakala	Pan-STARRS 1	EUP	3.2 km	MPC · JPL
520977	2015 AF_{3}	—	December 18, 2009	Kitt Peak	Spacewatch	T_{j} (2.96)	3.5 km	MPC · JPL
520978	2015 AT_{35}	—	September 13, 2004	Kitt Peak	Spacewatch	3:2	6.2 km	MPC · JPL
520979	2015 AC_{285}	—	February 8, 2011	Catalina	CSS	·	2.0 km	MPC · JPL
520980	2015 AE_{285}	—	September 3, 2008	Kitt Peak	Spacewatch	JUN	1.1 km	MPC · JPL
520981	2015 AJ_{285}	—	January 26, 2006	Catalina	CSS	·	1.8 km	MPC · JPL
520982	2015 AN_{285}	—	March 26, 2011	Mount Lemmon	Mount Lemmon Survey	·	1.6 km	MPC · JPL
520983	2015 AR_{285}	—	April 30, 2008	Kitt Peak	Spacewatch	PHO	890 m	MPC · JPL
520984	2015 AS_{285}	—	May 13, 2012	Mount Lemmon	Mount Lemmon Survey	·	960 m	MPC · JPL
520985	2015 AE_{286}	—	July 28, 2012	Haleakala	Pan-STARRS 1	VER	2.2 km	MPC · JPL
520986	2015 AH_{286}	—	December 7, 2005	Kitt Peak	Spacewatch	·	1.8 km	MPC · JPL
520987	2015 AJ_{286}	—	September 15, 2007	Kitt Peak	Spacewatch	EOS	1.7 km	MPC · JPL
520988	2015 AN_{286}	—	October 20, 2008	Mount Lemmon	Mount Lemmon Survey	·	1.5 km	MPC · JPL
520989	2015 AP_{286}	—	September 5, 2008	Kitt Peak	Spacewatch	·	1.9 km	MPC · JPL
520990	2015 AY_{286}	—	April 1, 2011	Kitt Peak	Spacewatch	GEF	940 m	MPC · JPL
520991	2015 AZ_{286}	—	November 9, 2013	Mount Lemmon	Mount Lemmon Survey	·	1.1 km	MPC · JPL
520992	2015 BM_{3}	—	December 17, 2009	Kitt Peak	Spacewatch	H	470 m	MPC · JPL
520993	2015 BB_{302}	—	January 19, 2015	Haleakala	Pan-STARRS 1	H	480 m	MPC · JPL
520994	2015 BD_{311}	—	June 9, 2013	Haleakala	Pan-STARRS 1	H	410 m	MPC · JPL
520995	2015 BJ_{325}	—	September 3, 2008	Kitt Peak	Spacewatch	AGN	1.2 km	MPC · JPL
520996	2015 BB_{373}	—	September 14, 2013	Kitt Peak	Spacewatch	·	1.5 km	MPC · JPL
520997	2015 BG_{514}	—	January 28, 2015	Haleakala	Pan-STARRS 1	H	560 m	MPC · JPL
520998	2015 BQ_{514}	—	August 24, 2011	Haleakala	Pan-STARRS 1	H	420 m	MPC · JPL
520999	2015 BJ_{515}	—	December 11, 2001	Socorro	LINEAR	H	590 m	MPC · JPL
521000	2015 BD_{520}	—	August 8, 2013	Haleakala	Pan-STARRS 1	H	480 m	MPC · JPL

back to top

== Meaning of names ==
As minor planet discoveries are confirmed, they are given a permanent number by the IAU's Minor Planet Center (MPC), and the discoverers can then submit names for them, following the IAU's naming conventions. The list below concerns those minor planets in the specified number-range that have received names, and explains the meanings of those names.

Official naming citations of newly named small Solar System bodies are approved and published in a bulletin by IAU's Working Group for Small Bodies Nomenclature (WGSBN). Before May 2021, citations were published in MPC's Minor Planet Circulars for many decades. Recent citations can also be found on the JPL Small-Body Database (SBDB). Until his death in 2016, German astronomer Lutz D. Schmadel compiled these citations into the Dictionary of Minor Planet Names (DMP) and regularly updated the collection.

Based on Paul Herget's The Names of the Minor Planets, Schmadel also researched the unclear origin of numerous asteroids, most of which had been named prior to World War II. This article incorporates text from this source, which is in the public domain: SBDB New namings may only be added to this list below after official publication as the preannouncement of names is condemned. The WGSBN publishes a comprehensive guideline for the naming rules of non-cometary small Solar System bodies.

Named minor planet	Provisional	This minor planet was named for...	Ref · Catalog
520585 Saci	2014 OA_{2}	Saci (Brazilian folklore)	IAU · 520585
