= List of minor planets: 468001–469000 =

The following is a partial list of minor planets, running from minor-planet number 468001 through 469000, inclusive. The primary data for this and other partial lists is based on JPL's "Small-Body Orbital Elements" and data available from the Minor Planet Center. Critical list information is also provided by the MPC, unless otherwise specified from Lowell Observatory. A detailed description of the table's columns and additional sources are given on the main page including a complete list of every page in this series, and a statistical break-up on the dynamical classification of minor planets.

Also see the summary list of all named bodies in numerical and alphabetical order, and the corresponding naming citations for the number range of this particular list. New namings may only be added to this list after official publication, as the preannouncement of names is condemned by the Working Group for Small Bodies Nomenclature of the International Astronomical Union.

Near-Earth obj.	MBA (inner)	MBA (outer)	Centaur
Mars-crosser	MBA (middle)	Jupiter trojan	Trans-Neptunian obj.
Unclassified

== 468001–468100 ==
Designation			Discovery			Properties		Ref
Permanent	Provisional	Named after	Date	Site	Discoverer(s)	Category	Diam.	Ref
468001	2012 UG_{166}	—	April 7, 2005	Mount Lemmon	Mount Lemmon Survey	L4	10 km	MPC · JPL
468002	2012 VH_{26}	—	April 24, 2007	Mount Lemmon	Mount Lemmon Survey	·	2.0 km	MPC · JPL
468003	2012 VC_{51}	—	April 13, 2010	Mount Lemmon	Mount Lemmon Survey	·	3.0 km	MPC · JPL
468004	2012 XD_{17}	—	December 5, 2012	Mount Lemmon	Mount Lemmon Survey	AMO	490 m	MPC · JPL
468005	2012 XD_{112}	—	December 10, 2012	Kitt Peak	Spacewatch	APO · PHA	210 m	MPC · JPL
468006	2012 XL_{128}	—	June 25, 2010	WISE	WISE	TIR	3.0 km	MPC · JPL
468007	2013 AR	—	November 4, 2004	Catalina	CSS	H	530 m	MPC · JPL
468008	2013 AO_{6}	—	January 13, 2005	Catalina	CSS	H	660 m	MPC · JPL
468009	2013 AS_{40}	—	September 22, 2009	Kitt Peak	Spacewatch	L4	7.1 km	MPC · JPL
468010	2013 AW_{63}	—	March 11, 2008	Catalina	CSS	H	600 m	MPC · JPL
468011	2013 AO_{103}	—	December 21, 2012	Mount Lemmon	Mount Lemmon Survey	L4	10 km	MPC · JPL
468012	2013 BP_{16}	—	February 14, 2002	Kitt Peak	Spacewatch	L4	6.6 km	MPC · JPL
468013	2013 BY_{17}	—	September 17, 2009	Kitt Peak	Spacewatch	L4	8.1 km	MPC · JPL
468014	2013 BN_{35}	—	October 17, 2010	Mount Lemmon	Mount Lemmon Survey	L4	8.7 km	MPC · JPL
468015	2013 BB_{54}	—	October 12, 2010	Mount Lemmon	Mount Lemmon Survey	L4 · ERY	7.6 km	MPC · JPL
468016	2013 BU_{75}	—	November 30, 2010	Mount Lemmon	Mount Lemmon Survey	L4	8.8 km	MPC · JPL
468017	2013 CH_{1}	—	February 9, 2008	Mount Lemmon	Mount Lemmon Survey	H	610 m	MPC · JPL
468018	2013 CU_{128}	—	August 29, 2006	Kitt Peak	Spacewatch	H	410 m	MPC · JPL
468019	2013 CG_{182}	—	September 19, 2006	Catalina	CSS	H	530 m	MPC · JPL
468020	2013 CD_{189}	—	December 14, 2006	Mount Lemmon	Mount Lemmon Survey	H	540 m	MPC · JPL
468021	2013 DR_{13}	—	September 19, 2006	Catalina	CSS	H	510 m	MPC · JPL
468022	2013 EV_{4}	—	February 14, 2010	Mount Lemmon	Mount Lemmon Survey	H	550 m	MPC · JPL
468023	2013 LY_{20}	—	June 13, 2005	Mount Lemmon	Mount Lemmon Survey	·	1.6 km	MPC · JPL
468024	2013 MX_{4}	—	July 3, 2003	Kitt Peak	Spacewatch	·	550 m	MPC · JPL
468025	2013 MN_{6}	—	January 10, 2008	Mount Lemmon	Mount Lemmon Survey	·	940 m	MPC · JPL
468026	2013 NR_{7}	—	July 17, 2010	WISE	WISE	·	550 m	MPC · JPL
468027	2013 OR_{9}	—	November 10, 2010	Kitt Peak	Spacewatch	·	780 m	MPC · JPL
468028	2013 PS_{1}	—	November 1, 2010	Mount Lemmon	Mount Lemmon Survey	V	610 m	MPC · JPL
468029	2013 PS_{5}	—	September 19, 2006	Catalina	CSS	·	830 m	MPC · JPL
468030	2013 PG_{25}	—	August 9, 2013	Kitt Peak	Spacewatch	V	750 m	MPC · JPL
468031	2013 PA_{30}	—	July 4, 2005	Mount Lemmon	Mount Lemmon Survey	·	1.2 km	MPC · JPL
468032	2013 PE_{55}	—	March 16, 2012	Mount Lemmon	Mount Lemmon Survey	NYS	960 m	MPC · JPL
468033	2013 PR_{73}	—	November 25, 2009	Kitt Peak	Spacewatch	·	2.4 km	MPC · JPL
468034	2013 PH_{74}	—	February 12, 2004	Kitt Peak	Spacewatch	LIX	3.6 km	MPC · JPL
468035	2013 QM_{2}	—	September 6, 1996	Kitt Peak	Spacewatch	·	500 m	MPC · JPL
468036	2013 QN_{3}	—	November 3, 2010	Mount Lemmon	Mount Lemmon Survey	·	520 m	MPC · JPL
468037	2013 QL_{22}	—	April 4, 2008	Mount Lemmon	Mount Lemmon Survey	·	1.5 km	MPC · JPL
468038	2013 QD_{27}	—	March 11, 2008	Kitt Peak	Spacewatch	·	1.3 km	MPC · JPL
468039	2013 QW_{31}	—	March 1, 2012	Mount Lemmon	Mount Lemmon Survey	·	1.2 km	MPC · JPL
468040	2013 QH_{39}	—	July 30, 2013	Kitt Peak	Spacewatch	·	990 m	MPC · JPL
468041	2013 QP_{58}	—	October 10, 1999	Kitt Peak	Spacewatch	·	800 m	MPC · JPL
468042	2013 QO_{67}	—	February 23, 2007	Mount Lemmon	Mount Lemmon Survey	·	1.5 km	MPC · JPL
468043	2013 QA_{68}	—	April 2, 2009	Kitt Peak	Spacewatch	·	600 m	MPC · JPL
468044 Lacatus	2013 QU_{74}	Lacatus	February 29, 2012	La Palma	EURONEAR	·	1.0 km	MPC · JPL
468045	2013 QB_{85}	—	November 6, 2010	Mount Lemmon	Mount Lemmon Survey	·	660 m	MPC · JPL
468046	2013 QL_{95}	—	March 17, 2012	Mount Lemmon	Mount Lemmon Survey	·	890 m	MPC · JPL
468047	2013 RT_{11}	—	February 13, 2008	Mount Lemmon	Mount Lemmon Survey	·	1.2 km	MPC · JPL
468048	2013 RN_{18}	—	October 27, 2006	Kitt Peak	Spacewatch	·	1.4 km	MPC · JPL
468049	2013 RK_{23}	—	March 30, 2011	Mount Lemmon	Mount Lemmon Survey	·	1.9 km	MPC · JPL
468050	2013 RW_{32}	—	March 29, 2008	Mount Lemmon	Mount Lemmon Survey	·	1.4 km	MPC · JPL
468051	2013 RA_{36}	—	January 6, 2010	Kitt Peak	Spacewatch	·	3.2 km	MPC · JPL
468052	2013 RK_{48}	—	November 3, 1999	Kitt Peak	Spacewatch	·	850 m	MPC · JPL
468053	2013 RT_{51}	—	October 9, 2004	Kitt Peak	Spacewatch	·	2.2 km	MPC · JPL
468054	2013 RC_{63}	—	December 7, 2005	Kitt Peak	Spacewatch	(17392)	1.2 km	MPC · JPL
468055	2013 RC_{67}	—	October 8, 2004	Kitt Peak	Spacewatch	AGN	1.0 km	MPC · JPL
468056	2013 RX_{75}	—	April 16, 2005	Kitt Peak	Spacewatch	NYS	860 m	MPC · JPL
468057	2013 RC_{85}	—	November 16, 2009	Mount Lemmon	Mount Lemmon Survey	·	1.8 km	MPC · JPL
468058	2013 RP_{93}	—	November 17, 2006	Mount Lemmon	Mount Lemmon Survey	·	1.0 km	MPC · JPL
468059	2013 SN_{15}	—	September 30, 1995	Kitt Peak	Spacewatch	·	620 m	MPC · JPL
468060	2013 SV_{22}	—	March 28, 2012	Kitt Peak	Spacewatch	·	1.3 km	MPC · JPL
468061	2013 SE_{24}	—	March 24, 2012	Mount Lemmon	Mount Lemmon Survey	·	1.1 km	MPC · JPL
468062	2013 SP_{25}	—	February 9, 2010	Kitt Peak	Spacewatch	·	2.6 km	MPC · JPL
468063	2013 SR_{30}	—	May 8, 2005	Mount Lemmon	Mount Lemmon Survey	MAS	720 m	MPC · JPL
468064	2013 SD_{31}	—	November 20, 2006	Kitt Peak	Spacewatch	·	990 m	MPC · JPL
468065	2013 SP_{34}	—	July 28, 2009	Catalina	CSS	MAS	780 m	MPC · JPL
468066	2013 SB_{41}	—	September 19, 2006	Catalina	CSS	·	770 m	MPC · JPL
468067	2013 SR_{51}	—	December 5, 2005	Kitt Peak	Spacewatch	(5)	1.1 km	MPC · JPL
468068	2013 SK_{56}	—	July 4, 2005	Kitt Peak	Spacewatch	·	1.1 km	MPC · JPL
468069	2013 SQ_{56}	—	March 2, 2011	Kitt Peak	Spacewatch	·	3.7 km	MPC · JPL
468070	2013 ST_{72}	—	March 13, 2012	Mount Lemmon	Mount Lemmon Survey	NYS	1.1 km	MPC · JPL
468071	2013 SC_{75}	—	April 10, 2005	Mount Lemmon	Mount Lemmon Survey	·	1.2 km	MPC · JPL
468072	2013 SN_{75}	—	October 1, 2005	Mount Lemmon	Mount Lemmon Survey	·	920 m	MPC · JPL
468073	2013 SA_{77}	—	September 20, 2009	Mount Lemmon	Mount Lemmon Survey	EUN	1.4 km	MPC · JPL
468074	2013 TB_{7}	—	August 2, 2009	Siding Spring	SSS	·	1.3 km	MPC · JPL
468075	2013 TS_{13}	—	September 28, 2006	Mount Lemmon	Mount Lemmon Survey	MAS	660 m	MPC · JPL
468076	2013 TS_{14}	—	September 29, 2009	Mount Lemmon	Mount Lemmon Survey	EUN	1.8 km	MPC · JPL
468077	2013 TU_{14}	—	November 10, 2006	Kitt Peak	Spacewatch	PHO	720 m	MPC · JPL
468078	2013 TB_{20}	—	June 23, 2009	Mount Lemmon	Mount Lemmon Survey	MAS	740 m	MPC · JPL
468079	2013 TH_{29}	—	November 9, 2008	Kitt Peak	Spacewatch	EOS	1.6 km	MPC · JPL
468080	2013 TO_{46}	—	March 29, 2011	Mount Lemmon	Mount Lemmon Survey	·	1.6 km	MPC · JPL
468081	2013 TO_{50}	—	August 19, 2009	Kitt Peak	Spacewatch	·	1.0 km	MPC · JPL
468082	2013 TL_{51}	—	June 17, 2009	Kitt Peak	Spacewatch	·	1.0 km	MPC · JPL
468083	2013 TF_{55}	—	October 4, 2013	Mount Lemmon	Mount Lemmon Survey	·	2.3 km	MPC · JPL
468084	2013 TN_{62}	—	October 28, 2005	Kitt Peak	Spacewatch	·	2.5 km	MPC · JPL
468085	2013 TT_{73}	—	May 5, 2008	Mount Lemmon	Mount Lemmon Survey	·	1.2 km	MPC · JPL
468086	2013 TX_{80}	—	October 21, 2006	Kitt Peak	Spacewatch	·	800 m	MPC · JPL
468087	2013 TQ_{95}	—	March 15, 2010	Mount Lemmon	Mount Lemmon Survey	·	2.2 km	MPC · JPL
468088	2013 TT_{101}	—	October 2, 2013	Kitt Peak	Spacewatch	·	3.5 km	MPC · JPL
468089	2013 TV_{103}	—	April 12, 2005	Kitt Peak	Spacewatch	·	2.8 km	MPC · JPL
468090	2013 TC_{122}	—	September 26, 2000	Socorro	LINEAR	·	1.5 km	MPC · JPL
468091	2013 TT_{143}	—	September 13, 2013	Mount Lemmon	Mount Lemmon Survey	·	1.0 km	MPC · JPL
468092	2013 TS_{155}	—	November 21, 2008	Kitt Peak	Spacewatch	·	2.6 km	MPC · JPL
468093	2013 UZ_{9}	—	April 24, 2011	Mount Lemmon	Mount Lemmon Survey	EOS	1.5 km	MPC · JPL
468094	2013 UL_{13}	—	August 17, 2009	Siding Spring	SSS	PHO	990 m	MPC · JPL
468095	2013 UW_{13}	—	July 13, 2010	WISE	WISE	·	3.6 km	MPC · JPL
468096	2013 VQ_{3}	—	November 19, 2008	Kitt Peak	Spacewatch	·	3.7 km	MPC · JPL
468097	2013 VC_{4}	—	January 27, 2006	Kitt Peak	Spacewatch	·	1.7 km	MPC · JPL
468098	2013 VW_{5}	—	September 20, 2009	Mount Lemmon	Mount Lemmon Survey	·	1.4 km	MPC · JPL
468099	2013 VF_{11}	—	September 16, 2009	Catalina	CSS	·	1.3 km	MPC · JPL
468100	2013 VA_{18}	—	January 7, 2010	Kitt Peak	Spacewatch	·	2.5 km	MPC · JPL

== 468101–468200 ==
back to top

Designation			Discovery			Properties		Ref
Permanent	Provisional	Named after	Date	Site	Discoverer(s)	Category	Diam.	Ref
468101	2013 WW_{3}	—	January 27, 2006	Kitt Peak	Spacewatch	·	2.1 km	MPC · JPL
468102	2013 WX_{5}	—	October 12, 2007	Catalina	CSS	slow	3.8 km	MPC · JPL
468103	2013 WN_{6}	—	March 12, 2011	Mount Lemmon	Mount Lemmon Survey	·	1.7 km	MPC · JPL
468104	2013 WK_{23}	—	March 17, 2004	Kitt Peak	Spacewatch	·	2.7 km	MPC · JPL
468105	2013 WT_{24}	—	October 26, 2000	Kitt Peak	Spacewatch	H	590 m	MPC · JPL
468106	2013 WE_{63}	—	November 1, 2008	Kitt Peak	Spacewatch	·	3.2 km	MPC · JPL
468107	2013 WN_{73}	—	August 10, 2007	Kitt Peak	Spacewatch	·	1.9 km	MPC · JPL
468108	2013 WO_{97}	—	November 2, 2013	Mount Lemmon	Mount Lemmon Survey	·	3.2 km	MPC · JPL
468109	2013 WO_{107}	—	October 26, 2013	Kitt Peak	Spacewatch	EOS	1.9 km	MPC · JPL
468110	2013 XQ_{13}	—	November 8, 2007	Catalina	CSS	·	3.9 km	MPC · JPL
468111	2013 YH_{3}	—	November 28, 2013	Mount Lemmon	Mount Lemmon Survey	·	3.4 km	MPC · JPL
468112	2013 YK_{38}	—	April 4, 2011	Catalina	CSS	·	2.5 km	MPC · JPL
468113	2013 YC_{53}	—	September 22, 2012	Mount Lemmon	Mount Lemmon Survey	EOS	2.0 km	MPC · JPL
468114	2013 YK_{54}	—	April 21, 2012	Mount Lemmon	Mount Lemmon Survey	·	1.7 km	MPC · JPL
468115	2013 YN_{54}	—	February 1, 2010	WISE	WISE	·	3.6 km	MPC · JPL
468116	2013 YL_{103}	—	May 26, 2006	Mount Lemmon	Mount Lemmon Survey	·	3.2 km	MPC · JPL
468117	2014 ED	—	March 1, 2014	WISE	WISE	APO	490 m	MPC · JPL
468118	2014 EO_{38}	—	January 5, 2013	Kitt Peak	Spacewatch	L4	8.9 km	MPC · JPL
468119	2014 QY_{2}	—	May 25, 2011	Kitt Peak	Spacewatch	H	560 m	MPC · JPL
468120	2014 QB_{254}	—	November 5, 2005	Catalina	CSS	·	2.0 km	MPC · JPL
468121	2014 SN_{298}	—	May 16, 2013	Mount Lemmon	Mount Lemmon Survey	·	870 m	MPC · JPL
468122	2014 TK_{11}	—	November 8, 2010	Mount Lemmon	Mount Lemmon Survey	·	1.6 km	MPC · JPL
468123	2014 TC_{45}	—	October 1, 2006	Kitt Peak	Spacewatch	·	1.6 km	MPC · JPL
468124	2014 TG_{65}	—	April 15, 2008	Kitt Peak	Spacewatch	·	1.6 km	MPC · JPL
468125	2014 UF_{7}	—	October 19, 2006	Kitt Peak	Spacewatch	H	410 m	MPC · JPL
468126	2014 UO_{32}	—	April 18, 2012	Kitt Peak	Spacewatch	·	1.4 km	MPC · JPL
468127	2014 UA_{36}	—	January 18, 2008	Mount Lemmon	Mount Lemmon Survey	·	1.4 km	MPC · JPL
468128	2014 UW_{66}	—	April 12, 2005	Anderson Mesa	LONEOS	·	2.7 km	MPC · JPL
468129	2014 UD_{67}	—	October 7, 2004	Kitt Peak	Spacewatch	·	580 m	MPC · JPL
468130	2014 UF_{85}	—	October 20, 2007	Kitt Peak	Spacewatch	V	570 m	MPC · JPL
468131	2014 UW_{88}	—	November 21, 2008	Kitt Peak	Spacewatch	·	770 m	MPC · JPL
468132	2014 UJ_{99}	—	February 3, 2009	Kitt Peak	Spacewatch	·	610 m	MPC · JPL
468133	2014 UZ_{106}	—	October 8, 2004	Kitt Peak	Spacewatch	·	620 m	MPC · JPL
468134	2014 UD_{109}	—	October 24, 2014	Kitt Peak	Spacewatch	EUN	1.1 km	MPC · JPL
468135	2014 UY_{114}	—	November 18, 2006	Mount Lemmon	Mount Lemmon Survey	H	470 m	MPC · JPL
468136	2014 UZ_{119}	—	September 28, 2003	Kitt Peak	Spacewatch	·	810 m	MPC · JPL
468137	2014 UZ_{121}	—	February 23, 2012	Mount Lemmon	Mount Lemmon Survey	EUN	1.3 km	MPC · JPL
468138	2014 UC_{133}	—	December 25, 2011	Mount Lemmon	Mount Lemmon Survey	NYS	910 m	MPC · JPL
468139	2014 UY_{134}	—	October 23, 1995	Kitt Peak	Spacewatch	·	830 m	MPC · JPL
468140	2014 UA_{139}	—	March 12, 2010	WISE	WISE	·	3.0 km	MPC · JPL
468141	2014 UY_{142}	—	April 30, 2008	Mount Lemmon	Mount Lemmon Survey	·	2.1 km	MPC · JPL
468142	2014 UE_{150}	—	November 23, 2006	Mount Lemmon	Mount Lemmon Survey	·	970 m	MPC · JPL
468143	2014 UF_{157}	—	December 31, 2008	Kitt Peak	Spacewatch	·	840 m	MPC · JPL
468144	2014 UT_{170}	—	September 4, 2003	Kitt Peak	Spacewatch	·	1.1 km	MPC · JPL
468145	2014 WY_{21}	—	October 28, 2005	Mount Lemmon	Mount Lemmon Survey	·	1.2 km	MPC · JPL
468146	2014 WF_{24}	—	March 14, 2011	Mount Lemmon	Mount Lemmon Survey	EOS	2.1 km	MPC · JPL
468147	2014 WD_{28}	—	December 4, 2007	Mount Lemmon	Mount Lemmon Survey	·	930 m	MPC · JPL
468148	2014 WF_{28}	—	November 5, 2007	Kitt Peak	Spacewatch	V	550 m	MPC · JPL
468149	2014 WD_{50}	—	October 8, 2010	Kitt Peak	Spacewatch	V	550 m	MPC · JPL
468150	2014 WZ_{62}	—	September 18, 2010	Mount Lemmon	Mount Lemmon Survey	·	990 m	MPC · JPL
468151	2014 WW_{67}	—	February 27, 2012	Kitt Peak	Spacewatch	·	980 m	MPC · JPL
468152	2014 WM_{68}	—	October 3, 2006	Mount Lemmon	Mount Lemmon Survey	H	420 m	MPC · JPL
468153	2014 WL_{79}	—	December 14, 2010	Mount Lemmon	Mount Lemmon Survey	·	1.1 km	MPC · JPL
468154	2014 WH_{85}	—	October 18, 2014	Kitt Peak	Spacewatch	·	910 m	MPC · JPL
468155	2014 WY_{87}	—	April 21, 1998	Kitt Peak	Spacewatch	NYS	1.0 km	MPC · JPL
468156	2014 WK_{96}	—	October 28, 2008	Mount Lemmon	Mount Lemmon Survey	·	2.9 km	MPC · JPL
468157	2014 WH_{234}	—	September 19, 2009	Kitt Peak	Spacewatch	·	2.6 km	MPC · JPL
468158	2014 WX_{251}	—	January 4, 2011	Mount Lemmon	Mount Lemmon Survey	JUN	1.0 km	MPC · JPL
468159	2014 WC_{263}	—	February 24, 2009	Mount Lemmon	Mount Lemmon Survey	PHO	920 m	MPC · JPL
468160	2014 WF_{281}	—	October 14, 2001	Kitt Peak	Spacewatch	·	600 m	MPC · JPL
468161	2014 WX_{354}	—	August 10, 2012	Kitt Peak	Spacewatch	(1118)	3.3 km	MPC · JPL
468162	2014 WA_{355}	—	January 13, 2010	Mount Lemmon	Mount Lemmon Survey	·	3.6 km	MPC · JPL
468163	2014 WS_{383}	—	March 11, 2005	Kitt Peak	Spacewatch	·	900 m	MPC · JPL
468164	2014 WK_{398}	—	November 16, 2006	Catalina	CSS	·	2.1 km	MPC · JPL
468165	2014 WQ_{398}	—	November 18, 2009	Mount Lemmon	Mount Lemmon Survey	·	2.8 km	MPC · JPL
468166	2014 WR_{402}	—	November 18, 2007	Mount Lemmon	Mount Lemmon Survey	V	580 m	MPC · JPL
468167	2014 WF_{426}	—	September 21, 2009	Mount Lemmon	Mount Lemmon Survey	·	1.8 km	MPC · JPL
468168	2014 WX_{473}	—	March 1, 2009	Kitt Peak	Spacewatch	·	730 m	MPC · JPL
468169	2014 WS_{478}	—	November 11, 2004	Socorro	LINEAR	·	3.5 km	MPC · JPL
468170	2014 WL_{481}	—	April 10, 2005	Kitt Peak	Spacewatch	·	3.0 km	MPC · JPL
468171	2014 WS_{481}	—	January 13, 2010	WISE	WISE	·	3.4 km	MPC · JPL
468172	2014 WD_{499}	—	December 3, 2010	Socorro	LINEAR	·	1.6 km	MPC · JPL
468173	2014 WE_{499}	—	November 28, 2010	Kitt Peak	Spacewatch	·	2.0 km	MPC · JPL
468174	2014 XM_{12}	—	December 17, 2001	Socorro	LINEAR	·	1.7 km	MPC · JPL
468175	2014 YY_{2}	—	June 16, 2010	WISE	WISE	·	2.7 km	MPC · JPL
468176	2014 YZ_{9}	—	January 8, 2002	Socorro	LINEAR	·	1.9 km	MPC · JPL
468177	2014 YQ_{10}	—	February 18, 2010	Kitt Peak	Spacewatch	·	2.3 km	MPC · JPL
468178	2014 YG_{13}	—	January 22, 2004	Socorro	LINEAR	·	3.5 km	MPC · JPL
468179	2014 YG_{28}	—	October 15, 2004	Kitt Peak	Spacewatch	·	630 m	MPC · JPL
468180	2014 YJ_{38}	—	April 30, 2003	Kitt Peak	Spacewatch	·	1.9 km	MPC · JPL
468181	2015 AA_{12}	—	April 30, 2011	Mount Lemmon	Mount Lemmon Survey	·	3.7 km	MPC · JPL
468182	2015 AX_{36}	—	February 27, 2006	Kitt Peak	Spacewatch	·	1.9 km	MPC · JPL
468183	2015 AD_{38}	—	September 27, 2009	Mount Lemmon	Mount Lemmon Survey	(5)	1.3 km	MPC · JPL
468184	2015 AB_{119}	—	January 26, 2006	Kitt Peak	Spacewatch	HOF	2.7 km	MPC · JPL
468185	2015 AA_{144}	—	September 19, 2009	Mount Lemmon	Mount Lemmon Survey	·	1.5 km	MPC · JPL
468186	2015 AV_{168}	—	February 19, 2010	Mount Lemmon	Mount Lemmon Survey	·	3.4 km	MPC · JPL
468187	2015 AT_{174}	—	March 14, 2007	Mount Lemmon	Mount Lemmon Survey	·	1.7 km	MPC · JPL
468188	2015 AP_{180}	—	October 23, 2014	Mount Lemmon	Mount Lemmon Survey	·	3.5 km	MPC · JPL
468189	2015 AX_{181}	—	July 27, 2009	Catalina	CSS	NYS	1.4 km	MPC · JPL
468190	2015 AB_{195}	—	October 30, 2005	Kitt Peak	Spacewatch	·	1.1 km	MPC · JPL
468191	2015 AP_{241}	—	October 7, 2005	Mauna Kea	A. Boattini	·	2.4 km	MPC · JPL
468192	2015 AV_{241}	—	May 21, 2011	Mount Lemmon	Mount Lemmon Survey	EOS	2.1 km	MPC · JPL
468193	2015 AM_{248}	—	October 8, 2008	Kitt Peak	Spacewatch	·	2.9 km	MPC · JPL
468194	2015 AD_{252}	—	January 10, 2011	Mount Lemmon	Mount Lemmon Survey	·	1.1 km	MPC · JPL
468195	2015 AD_{258}	—	October 25, 2008	Mount Lemmon	Mount Lemmon Survey	·	2.5 km	MPC · JPL
468196	2015 AC_{262}	—	February 10, 2010	WISE	WISE	·	3.4 km	MPC · JPL
468197	2015 AA_{273}	—	September 29, 2005	Mount Lemmon	Mount Lemmon Survey	·	1.1 km	MPC · JPL
468198	2015 AK_{279}	—	January 16, 1999	Kitt Peak	Spacewatch	·	2.5 km	MPC · JPL
468199	2015 BK_{1}	—	September 11, 2004	Kitt Peak	Spacewatch	·	1.9 km	MPC · JPL
468200	2015 BC_{11}	—	October 21, 2009	Mount Lemmon	Mount Lemmon Survey	·	2.0 km	MPC · JPL

== 468201–468300 ==
back to top

Designation			Discovery			Properties		Ref
Permanent	Provisional	Named after	Date	Site	Discoverer(s)	Category	Diam.	Ref
468201	2015 BE_{27}	—	February 17, 2004	Kitt Peak	Spacewatch	·	3.3 km	MPC · JPL
468202	2015 BH_{31}	—	February 16, 2010	Kitt Peak	Spacewatch	·	2.3 km	MPC · JPL
468203	2015 BK_{39}	—	May 30, 2010	WISE	WISE	·	3.9 km	MPC · JPL
468204	2015 BZ_{40}	—	November 1, 2013	Mount Lemmon	Mount Lemmon Survey	·	2.5 km	MPC · JPL
468205	2015 BJ_{41}	—	February 20, 2006	Kitt Peak	Spacewatch	·	1.8 km	MPC · JPL
468206	2015 BV_{42}	—	September 28, 2009	Kitt Peak	Spacewatch	·	1.0 km	MPC · JPL
468207	2015 BG_{53}	—	October 28, 2008	Mount Lemmon	Mount Lemmon Survey	·	1.8 km	MPC · JPL
468208	2015 BF_{58}	—	February 10, 2008	Kitt Peak	Spacewatch	·	1.4 km	MPC · JPL
468209	2015 BT_{60}	—	January 31, 2006	Kitt Peak	Spacewatch	(12739)	2.1 km	MPC · JPL
468210	2015 BX_{60}	—	February 19, 2010	Mount Lemmon	Mount Lemmon Survey	·	2.6 km	MPC · JPL
468211	2015 BX_{63}	—	June 14, 2010	WISE	WISE	·	2.6 km	MPC · JPL
468212	2015 BP_{64}	—	February 18, 2010	Mount Lemmon	Mount Lemmon Survey	·	3.2 km	MPC · JPL
468213	2015 BX_{73}	—	April 12, 2005	Kitt Peak	Spacewatch	·	2.4 km	MPC · JPL
468214	2015 BZ_{73}	—	December 22, 2005	Kitt Peak	Spacewatch	·	2.5 km	MPC · JPL
468215	2015 BC_{84}	—	October 4, 2013	Mount Lemmon	Mount Lemmon Survey	VER	2.4 km	MPC · JPL
468216	2015 BF_{85}	—	November 17, 2009	Mount Lemmon	Mount Lemmon Survey	·	1.4 km	MPC · JPL
468217	2015 BH_{87}	—	January 28, 2006	Kitt Peak	Spacewatch	·	2.0 km	MPC · JPL
468218	2015 BP_{98}	—	October 9, 2008	Mount Lemmon	Mount Lemmon Survey	·	1.8 km	MPC · JPL
468219	2015 BB_{100}	—	September 23, 2008	Kitt Peak	Spacewatch	·	1.6 km	MPC · JPL
468220	2015 BA_{105}	—	January 13, 2002	Socorro	LINEAR	·	1.4 km	MPC · JPL
468221	2015 BG_{109}	—	December 14, 1998	Kitt Peak	Spacewatch	·	1.5 km	MPC · JPL
468222	2015 BA_{122}	—	June 15, 2012	Kitt Peak	Spacewatch	·	2.1 km	MPC · JPL
468223	2015 BN_{126}	—	February 16, 2010	Mount Lemmon	Mount Lemmon Survey	·	1.5 km	MPC · JPL
468224	2015 BG_{132}	—	September 4, 2008	Kitt Peak	Spacewatch	·	1.9 km	MPC · JPL
468225	2015 BJ_{133}	—	November 7, 2008	Mount Lemmon	Mount Lemmon Survey	·	1.5 km	MPC · JPL
468226	2015 BS_{143}	—	December 18, 2009	Kitt Peak	Spacewatch	HOF	2.3 km	MPC · JPL
468227	2015 BC_{162}	—	December 4, 2005	Kitt Peak	Spacewatch	·	2.1 km	MPC · JPL
468228	2015 BJ_{169}	—	September 14, 2006	Catalina	CSS	NYS	960 m	MPC · JPL
468229	2015 BR_{170}	—	August 10, 2007	Kitt Peak	Spacewatch	·	1.8 km	MPC · JPL
468230	2015 BV_{171}	—	January 4, 2006	Mount Lemmon	Mount Lemmon Survey	·	1.6 km	MPC · JPL
468231	2015 BH_{193}	—	January 15, 2005	Kitt Peak	Spacewatch	·	2.2 km	MPC · JPL
468232	2015 BU_{203}	—	December 5, 2005	Kitt Peak	Spacewatch	·	2.4 km	MPC · JPL
468233	2015 BV_{216}	—	January 7, 2010	Mount Lemmon	Mount Lemmon Survey	·	1.7 km	MPC · JPL
468234	2015 BG_{223}	—	January 31, 2006	Kitt Peak	Spacewatch	·	1.6 km	MPC · JPL
468235	2015 BP_{223}	—	September 23, 2008	Catalina	CSS	·	2.5 km	MPC · JPL
468236	2015 BZ_{223}	—	January 7, 2006	Mount Lemmon	Mount Lemmon Survey	·	2.1 km	MPC · JPL
468237	2015 BM_{228}	—	April 25, 2004	Kitt Peak	Spacewatch	·	2.4 km	MPC · JPL
468238	2015 BJ_{238}	—	April 14, 2007	Mount Lemmon	Mount Lemmon Survey	·	1.6 km	MPC · JPL
468239	2015 BB_{241}	—	November 15, 2003	Kitt Peak	Spacewatch	·	1.8 km	MPC · JPL
468240	2015 BU_{242}	—	March 23, 2004	Kitt Peak	Spacewatch	HYG	2.8 km	MPC · JPL
468241	2015 BX_{242}	—	April 30, 2006	Kitt Peak	Spacewatch	·	1.6 km	MPC · JPL
468242	2015 BP_{245}	—	December 28, 2005	Mount Lemmon	Mount Lemmon Survey	·	1.6 km	MPC · JPL
468243	2015 BK_{246}	—	January 26, 2006	Kitt Peak	Spacewatch	·	1.8 km	MPC · JPL
468244	2015 BX_{249}	—	December 17, 2009	Kitt Peak	Spacewatch	AGN	1.5 km	MPC · JPL
468245	2015 BV_{253}	—	October 1, 1999	Kitt Peak	Spacewatch	·	2.4 km	MPC · JPL
468246	2015 BE_{255}	—	December 18, 2003	Kitt Peak	Spacewatch	EOS	2.6 km	MPC · JPL
468247	2015 BG_{256}	—	April 28, 2012	Mount Lemmon	Mount Lemmon Survey	V	680 m	MPC · JPL
468248	2015 BD_{258}	—	January 8, 2010	Kitt Peak	Spacewatch	·	2.1 km	MPC · JPL
468249	2015 BT_{271}	—	June 5, 2010	WISE	WISE	EOS	1.9 km	MPC · JPL
468250	2015 BO_{278}	—	September 10, 2007	Mount Lemmon	Mount Lemmon Survey	·	2.2 km	MPC · JPL
468251	2015 BT_{285}	—	February 12, 2004	Kitt Peak	Spacewatch	·	3.0 km	MPC · JPL
468252	2015 BF_{289}	—	October 9, 2004	Kitt Peak	Spacewatch	·	1.9 km	MPC · JPL
468253	2015 BQ_{291}	—	June 27, 2010	WISE	WISE	·	2.9 km	MPC · JPL
468254	2015 BV_{306}	—	December 31, 2008	Catalina	CSS	·	3.8 km	MPC · JPL
468255	2015 BS_{310}	—	March 21, 2010	Catalina	CSS	EOS	2.5 km	MPC · JPL
468256	2015 BE_{326}	—	October 8, 2008	Kitt Peak	Spacewatch	KOR	1.5 km	MPC · JPL
468257	2015 BW_{346}	—	December 10, 2005	Kitt Peak	Spacewatch	KOR	1.6 km	MPC · JPL
468258	2015 BZ_{347}	—	May 20, 2006	Kitt Peak	Spacewatch	PHO	980 m	MPC · JPL
468259	2015 BM_{361}	—	November 24, 2009	Kitt Peak	Spacewatch	·	2.1 km	MPC · JPL
468260	2015 BF_{383}	—	November 10, 2009	Mount Lemmon	Mount Lemmon Survey	(5)	1.0 km	MPC · JPL
468261	2015 BR_{396}	—	May 8, 2010	WISE	WISE	·	4.3 km	MPC · JPL
468262	2015 BH_{406}	—	February 1, 2006	Kitt Peak	Spacewatch	·	1.8 km	MPC · JPL
468263	2015 BA_{408}	—	September 29, 1994	Kitt Peak	Spacewatch	AST	2.0 km	MPC · JPL
468264	2015 BA_{455}	—	February 10, 2010	Kitt Peak	Spacewatch	·	2.1 km	MPC · JPL
468265	2015 BO_{471}	—	October 14, 2009	Mount Lemmon	Mount Lemmon Survey	·	1.3 km	MPC · JPL
468266	2015 BF_{474}	—	December 27, 2006	Mount Lemmon	Mount Lemmon Survey	·	1.2 km	MPC · JPL
468267	2015 BX_{480}	—	December 10, 2009	Mount Lemmon	Mount Lemmon Survey	·	2.2 km	MPC · JPL
468268	2015 BO_{497}	—	September 12, 2007	Mount Lemmon	Mount Lemmon Survey	·	2.0 km	MPC · JPL
468269	2015 CK_{1}	—	March 2, 2006	Kitt Peak	Spacewatch	·	2.5 km	MPC · JPL
468270	2015 CE_{6}	—	January 26, 2006	Kitt Peak	Spacewatch	AGN	1.1 km	MPC · JPL
468271	2015 CJ_{9}	—	October 18, 2007	Mount Lemmon	Mount Lemmon Survey	HYG	3.1 km	MPC · JPL
468272	2015 CS_{14}	—	September 24, 2008	Kitt Peak	Spacewatch	·	2.0 km	MPC · JPL
468273	2015 CD_{15}	—	February 16, 2004	Kitt Peak	Spacewatch	·	3.1 km	MPC · JPL
468274	2015 CK_{15}	—	January 6, 2010	Kitt Peak	Spacewatch	·	2.4 km	MPC · JPL
468275	2015 CE_{28}	—	June 23, 2010	WISE	WISE	·	4.0 km	MPC · JPL
468276	2015 CX_{28}	—	April 25, 2007	Kitt Peak	Spacewatch	·	1.7 km	MPC · JPL
468277	2015 CT_{36}	—	September 15, 2007	Mount Lemmon	Mount Lemmon Survey	·	3.1 km	MPC · JPL
468278	2015 CZ_{42}	—	August 28, 2006	Kitt Peak	Spacewatch	(31811)	2.7 km	MPC · JPL
468279	2015 DX_{4}	—	October 15, 2009	Catalina	CSS	·	3.1 km	MPC · JPL
468280	2015 DE_{12}	—	March 20, 2010	Mount Lemmon	Mount Lemmon Survey	·	2.6 km	MPC · JPL
468281	2015 DY_{13}	—	September 15, 2004	Kitt Peak	Spacewatch	·	1.4 km	MPC · JPL
468282	2015 DM_{65}	—	December 21, 2008	Kitt Peak	Spacewatch	THM	2.0 km	MPC · JPL
468283	2015 DP_{68}	—	February 26, 2008	Mount Lemmon	Mount Lemmon Survey	·	1.0 km	MPC · JPL
468284	2015 DQ_{80}	—	January 1, 2009	Kitt Peak	Spacewatch	·	2.1 km	MPC · JPL
468285	2015 DO_{100}	—	November 18, 2008	Kitt Peak	Spacewatch	·	2.9 km	MPC · JPL
468286	2015 DX_{108}	—	April 25, 2007	Kitt Peak	Spacewatch	·	1.9 km	MPC · JPL
468287	2015 DH_{111}	—	October 6, 2007	Kitt Peak	Spacewatch	·	2.8 km	MPC · JPL
468288	2015 DW_{140}	—	March 8, 1994	Kitt Peak	Spacewatch	·	2.3 km	MPC · JPL
468289	2015 DA_{147}	—	September 22, 2008	Catalina	CSS	·	2.9 km	MPC · JPL
468290	2015 DT_{159}	—	January 2, 2009	Mount Lemmon	Mount Lemmon Survey	EOS	2.2 km	MPC · JPL
468291	2015 DV_{161}	—	December 29, 2003	Kitt Peak	Spacewatch	EOS	1.7 km	MPC · JPL
468292	2015 DU_{172}	—	October 12, 2007	Mount Lemmon	Mount Lemmon Survey	·	3.2 km	MPC · JPL
468293	2015 DF_{173}	—	October 6, 1999	Kitt Peak	Spacewatch	·	3.0 km	MPC · JPL
468294	2015 DW_{193}	—	January 1, 2009	Mount Lemmon	Mount Lemmon Survey	·	2.3 km	MPC · JPL
468295	2015 EV_{2}	—	December 29, 2003	Kitt Peak	Spacewatch	·	2.1 km	MPC · JPL
468296	2015 EP_{13}	—	November 9, 1999	Kitt Peak	Spacewatch	HOF	2.5 km	MPC · JPL
468297	2015 EZ_{16}	—	October 10, 2004	Kitt Peak	Spacewatch	PAD	2.1 km	MPC · JPL
468298	2015 EP_{17}	—	December 21, 2008	Kitt Peak	Spacewatch	·	2.8 km	MPC · JPL
468299	2015 ET_{18}	—	November 3, 2005	Catalina	CSS	·	1.6 km	MPC · JPL
468300	2015 FH_{3}	—	December 27, 2006	Kitt Peak	Spacewatch	·	1.9 km	MPC · JPL

== 468301–468400 ==
back to top

Designation			Discovery			Properties		Ref
Permanent	Provisional	Named after	Date	Site	Discoverer(s)	Category	Diam.	Ref
468301	2015 FX_{125}	—	June 14, 2012	Mount Lemmon	Mount Lemmon Survey	MAR	920 m	MPC · JPL
468302	2015 FO_{211}	—	September 21, 2009	Kitt Peak	Spacewatch	L4	9.4 km	MPC · JPL
468303	2015 FO_{339}	—	April 11, 2007	Siding Spring	SSS	MAR	1.5 km	MPC · JPL
468304	2015 HC_{7}	—	November 12, 2010	Kitt Peak	Spacewatch	L4	8.2 km	MPC · JPL
468305	2015 YA_{8}	—	August 21, 2008	Kitt Peak	Spacewatch	·	1.6 km	MPC · JPL
468306	2016 AK_{75}	—	March 8, 2005	Catalina	CSS	VER	3.7 km	MPC · JPL
468307	2016 AB_{108}	—	December 10, 2004	Socorro	LINEAR	·	3.9 km	MPC · JPL
468308	2016 AM_{123}	—	November 4, 2005	Mount Lemmon	Mount Lemmon Survey	·	1.9 km	MPC · JPL
468309	2016 AD_{128}	—	June 19, 2004	Anderson Mesa	LONEOS	JUN	1.2 km	MPC · JPL
468310	2016 AC_{182}	—	June 1, 2008	Mount Lemmon	Mount Lemmon Survey	·	2.2 km	MPC · JPL
468311	2016 BJ_{10}	—	April 17, 2009	Catalina	CSS	·	940 m	MPC · JPL
468312	2016 BW_{38}	—	January 27, 2006	Catalina	CSS	·	4.2 km	MPC · JPL
468313	2016 BU_{62}	—	October 27, 2003	Kitt Peak	Spacewatch	·	3.9 km	MPC · JPL
468314	2016 CU_{26}	—	March 30, 2008	Catalina	CSS	·	1.3 km	MPC · JPL
468315	2016 CJ_{49}	—	January 13, 2002	Kitt Peak	Spacewatch	·	2.5 km	MPC · JPL
468316	2016 CJ_{65}	—	December 14, 2010	Mount Lemmon	Mount Lemmon Survey	·	2.4 km	MPC · JPL
468317	2016 CW_{65}	—	December 21, 2006	Mount Lemmon	Mount Lemmon Survey	·	1.8 km	MPC · JPL
468318	2016 CP_{70}	—	September 21, 2003	Kitt Peak	Spacewatch	·	2.7 km	MPC · JPL
468319	2016 CT_{71}	—	November 3, 1999	Kitt Peak	Spacewatch	·	2.6 km	MPC · JPL
468320	2016 CQ_{75}	—	September 30, 2010	Mount Lemmon	Mount Lemmon Survey	·	1.8 km	MPC · JPL
468321	2016 CD_{83}	—	November 10, 2004	Kitt Peak	Spacewatch	·	810 m	MPC · JPL
468322	2016 CX_{84}	—	November 15, 2006	Mount Lemmon	Mount Lemmon Survey	526	2.9 km	MPC · JPL
468323	2016 CE_{89}	—	May 2, 2006	Mount Lemmon	Mount Lemmon Survey	EOS	1.8 km	MPC · JPL
468324	2016 CR_{102}	—	June 17, 2009	Mount Lemmon	Mount Lemmon Survey	·	2.6 km	MPC · JPL
468325	2016 CM_{110}	—	March 14, 2007	Catalina	CSS	GEF	1.9 km	MPC · JPL
468326	2016 CW_{149}	—	March 3, 2005	Catalina	CSS	·	4.5 km	MPC · JPL
468327	2016 CT_{189}	—	March 26, 2010	WISE	WISE	LIX	3.9 km	MPC · JPL
468328	2016 CH_{225}	—	November 23, 2003	Kitt Peak	Spacewatch	·	3.6 km	MPC · JPL
468329	2016 CU_{231}	—	October 21, 2006	Catalina	CSS	MAR · slow	1.4 km	MPC · JPL
468330	2016 CP_{240}	—	October 26, 2005	Kitt Peak	Spacewatch	·	1.7 km	MPC · JPL
468331	2016 CC_{243}	—	November 16, 2006	Mount Lemmon	Mount Lemmon Survey	EUN	880 m	MPC · JPL
468332	2016 CJ_{243}	—	March 17, 2012	Catalina	CSS	·	2.0 km	MPC · JPL
468333	2016 DK_{16}	—	August 17, 2009	Kitt Peak	Spacewatch	·	1.6 km	MPC · JPL
468334	2016 DK_{23}	—	December 20, 2009	Mount Lemmon	Mount Lemmon Survey	·	2.9 km	MPC · JPL
468335	2016 ET_{4}	—	April 7, 2008	Mount Lemmon	Mount Lemmon Survey	H	520 m	MPC · JPL
468336	2016 ET_{7}	—	October 28, 2008	Mount Lemmon	Mount Lemmon Survey	·	2.5 km	MPC · JPL
468337	2016 EN_{36}	—	December 14, 2006	Kitt Peak	Spacewatch	·	1.3 km	MPC · JPL
468338	2016 EW_{53}	—	October 10, 2005	Catalina	CSS	·	1.4 km	MPC · JPL
468339	2016 EC_{63}	—	January 12, 2010	Kitt Peak	Spacewatch	·	3.0 km	MPC · JPL
468340	2016 EA_{65}	—	February 9, 2010	Kitt Peak	Spacewatch	·	2.7 km	MPC · JPL
468341	2016 EL_{66}	—	March 10, 2005	Mount Lemmon	Mount Lemmon Survey	·	2.9 km	MPC · JPL
468342	2016 ER_{73}	—	November 30, 2008	Kitt Peak	Spacewatch	·	760 m	MPC · JPL
468343	2016 ED_{77}	—	October 1, 1999	Kitt Peak	Spacewatch	·	1.2 km	MPC · JPL
468344	2016 EN_{79}	—	July 7, 2005	Kitt Peak	Spacewatch	·	1.5 km	MPC · JPL
468345	2016 EJ_{80}	—	May 24, 2006	Kitt Peak	Spacewatch	·	1.1 km	MPC · JPL
468346	2016 ER_{80}	—	February 16, 2002	Kitt Peak	Spacewatch	·	2.0 km	MPC · JPL
468347	2016 EN_{87}	—	January 13, 2002	Kitt Peak	Spacewatch	·	2.0 km	MPC · JPL
468348	2016 ER_{108}	—	August 16, 2009	Kitt Peak	Spacewatch	·	2.1 km	MPC · JPL
468349	2016 ER_{110}	—	October 30, 2008	Mount Lemmon	Mount Lemmon Survey	·	2.3 km	MPC · JPL
468350	2016 EH_{113}	—	April 20, 2012	Siding Spring	SSS	(194)	1.9 km	MPC · JPL
468351	2016 EO_{129}	—	March 11, 2007	Mount Lemmon	Mount Lemmon Survey	·	2.2 km	MPC · JPL
468352	2016 EB_{136}	—	April 5, 2000	Kitt Peak	Spacewatch	·	2.8 km	MPC · JPL
468353	2016 EL_{136}	—	May 11, 2002	Socorro	LINEAR	·	1.2 km	MPC · JPL
468354	2016 EJ_{141}	—	October 4, 2007	Mount Lemmon	Mount Lemmon Survey	VER	2.6 km	MPC · JPL
468355	2016 EF_{144}	—	September 29, 2009	Mount Lemmon	Mount Lemmon Survey	·	1.3 km	MPC · JPL
468356	2016 EP_{145}	—	March 8, 2005	Mount Lemmon	Mount Lemmon Survey	·	2.3 km	MPC · JPL
468357	2016 EW_{154}	—	October 12, 2005	Kitt Peak	Spacewatch	·	1.2 km	MPC · JPL
468358	2016 EH_{161}	—	December 3, 2010	Catalina	CSS	·	1.9 km	MPC · JPL
468359	2016 EN_{161}	—	January 28, 2007	Catalina	CSS	·	2.6 km	MPC · JPL
468360	2016 EM_{162}	—	January 11, 1999	Kitt Peak	Spacewatch	EUN	1.5 km	MPC · JPL
468361	2016 EC_{171}	—	March 21, 2002	Kitt Peak	Spacewatch	·	2.3 km	MPC · JPL
468362	2016 EC_{179}	—	February 18, 2010	Kitt Peak	Spacewatch	·	2.8 km	MPC · JPL
468363	2016 EH_{181}	—	March 17, 2005	Kitt Peak	Spacewatch	·	3.3 km	MPC · JPL
468364	2016 EK_{187}	—	November 9, 2009	Kitt Peak	Spacewatch	·	1.6 km	MPC · JPL
468365	2016 EF_{196}	—	February 25, 2012	Mount Lemmon	Mount Lemmon Survey	·	1.9 km	MPC · JPL
468366	2016 EO_{202}	—	September 19, 2001	Socorro	LINEAR	·	4.6 km	MPC · JPL
468367	2016 FX_{9}	—	November 22, 2009	Mount Lemmon	Mount Lemmon Survey	·	4.3 km	MPC · JPL
468368	2016 FV_{15}	—	October 8, 1996	Kitt Peak	Spacewatch	·	1.1 km	MPC · JPL
468369	2016 FH_{34}	—	April 30, 2011	Mount Lemmon	Mount Lemmon Survey	·	2.6 km	MPC · JPL
468370	2016 FG_{36}	—	March 4, 2005	Mount Lemmon	Mount Lemmon Survey	·	1.8 km	MPC · JPL
468371	2016 FL_{36}	—	May 24, 2001	Kitt Peak	Spacewatch	·	1.7 km	MPC · JPL
468372	2016 FP_{38}	—	November 7, 2007	Mount Lemmon	Mount Lemmon Survey	·	3.4 km	MPC · JPL
468373	2016 FG_{41}	—	November 28, 2005	Mount Lemmon	Mount Lemmon Survey	·	1.8 km	MPC · JPL
468374	2016 FM_{43}	—	May 9, 2002	Socorro	LINEAR	V	930 m	MPC · JPL
468375	2016 FB_{46}	—	November 4, 2004	Kitt Peak	Spacewatch	KOR	1.7 km	MPC · JPL
468376	2016 FK_{54}	—	September 1, 2005	Kitt Peak	Spacewatch	·	1.2 km	MPC · JPL
468377	2016 FV_{54}	—	March 12, 2008	Kitt Peak	Spacewatch	·	1.6 km	MPC · JPL
468378	2016 FZ_{54}	—	October 17, 2009	Mount Lemmon	Mount Lemmon Survey	·	1.3 km	MPC · JPL
468379	2016 FB_{56}	—	March 10, 2005	Kitt Peak	Spacewatch	NYS	900 m	MPC · JPL
468380	2016 FM_{56}	—	January 29, 2009	Mount Lemmon	Mount Lemmon Survey	CYB	3.6 km	MPC · JPL
468381	2016 GH_{10}	—	October 29, 2008	Kitt Peak	Spacewatch	·	2.7 km	MPC · JPL
468382	2016 GR_{12}	—	October 26, 2009	Kitt Peak	Spacewatch	·	1.7 km	MPC · JPL
468383	2016 GA_{13}	—	May 25, 2006	Kitt Peak	Spacewatch	·	980 m	MPC · JPL
468384	2016 GP_{13}	—	October 9, 2013	Kitt Peak	Spacewatch	MRX	1.1 km	MPC · JPL
468385	2016 GS_{65}	—	February 2, 2005	Kitt Peak	Spacewatch	NYS	700 m	MPC · JPL
468386	2016 GW_{65}	—	December 29, 2003	Kitt Peak	Spacewatch	·	1.3 km	MPC · JPL
468387	2016 GT_{101}	—	November 12, 2007	Mount Lemmon	Mount Lemmon Survey	·	510 m	MPC · JPL
468388	2016 GL_{102}	—	October 10, 2007	Mount Lemmon	Mount Lemmon Survey	VER	2.4 km	MPC · JPL
468389	2016 GX_{103}	—	February 7, 2008	Kitt Peak	Spacewatch	·	1.1 km	MPC · JPL
468390	2016 GP_{105}	—	October 8, 2004	Kitt Peak	Spacewatch	·	1.8 km	MPC · JPL
468391	2016 GS_{107}	—	April 6, 2005	Kitt Peak	Spacewatch	·	3.3 km	MPC · JPL
468392	2016 GC_{112}	—	December 14, 2004	Catalina	CSS	·	720 m	MPC · JPL
468393	2016 GD_{113}	—	April 5, 2011	Mount Lemmon	Mount Lemmon Survey	·	1.4 km	MPC · JPL
468394	2016 GN_{119}	—	June 24, 2009	Mount Lemmon	Mount Lemmon Survey	·	1.1 km	MPC · JPL
468395	2016 GH_{121}	—	March 13, 2005	Kitt Peak	Spacewatch	·	2.2 km	MPC · JPL
468396	2016 GJ_{121}	—	September 13, 2005	Kitt Peak	Spacewatch	·	1.1 km	MPC · JPL
468397	2016 GR_{124}	—	June 1, 2010	WISE	WISE	VER	3.8 km	MPC · JPL
468398	2016 GW_{125}	—	September 30, 2003	Kitt Peak	Spacewatch	KOR	1.7 km	MPC · JPL
468399	2016 GN_{126}	—	September 15, 2006	Kitt Peak	Spacewatch	·	2.6 km	MPC · JPL
468400	2016 GU_{126}	—	November 5, 2005	Mount Lemmon	Mount Lemmon Survey	·	1.2 km	MPC · JPL

== 468401–468500 ==
back to top

Designation			Discovery			Properties		Ref
Permanent	Provisional	Named after	Date	Site	Discoverer(s)	Category	Diam.	Ref
468401	2016 GA_{127}	—	October 11, 2007	Kitt Peak	Spacewatch	·	640 m	MPC · JPL
468402	2016 GC_{130}	—	April 22, 2009	Mount Lemmon	Mount Lemmon Survey	·	710 m	MPC · JPL
468403	2016 GX_{132}	—	April 3, 2010	WISE	WISE	NAE	3.1 km	MPC · JPL
468404	2016 GB_{133}	—	February 24, 2006	Mount Lemmon	Mount Lemmon Survey	KOR	1.6 km	MPC · JPL
468405	2016 GP_{154}	—	December 30, 2008	Mount Lemmon	Mount Lemmon Survey	·	860 m	MPC · JPL
468406	2016 GT_{154}	—	March 17, 2005	Catalina	CSS	·	4.0 km	MPC · JPL
468407	2016 GP_{165}	—	April 2, 2005	Mount Lemmon	Mount Lemmon Survey	·	1.4 km	MPC · JPL
468408	2016 GH_{174}	—	October 26, 1995	Kitt Peak	Spacewatch	·	1.7 km	MPC · JPL
468409	2016 GK_{175}	—	September 13, 2007	Mount Lemmon	Mount Lemmon Survey	EOS	1.6 km	MPC · JPL
468410	2016 GU_{176}	—	May 25, 2006	Mount Lemmon	Mount Lemmon Survey	·	1.6 km	MPC · JPL
468411	2016 GF_{180}	—	January 12, 2010	Catalina	CSS	·	2.8 km	MPC · JPL
468412	2016 GF_{191}	—	February 14, 2010	Kitt Peak	Spacewatch	·	3.6 km	MPC · JPL
468413	2016 GH_{191}	—	July 1, 2008	Kitt Peak	Spacewatch	·	1.6 km	MPC · JPL
468414	2016 GV_{204}	—	November 6, 2010	Mount Lemmon	Mount Lemmon Survey	·	1.2 km	MPC · JPL
468415	2016 GZ_{204}	—	December 22, 2005	Kitt Peak	Spacewatch	·	1.6 km	MPC · JPL
468416	2016 GO_{215}	—	September 19, 2003	Kitt Peak	Spacewatch	·	780 m	MPC · JPL
468417	1995 SB_{69}	—	September 27, 1995	Kitt Peak	Spacewatch	·	2.3 km	MPC · JPL
468418	1999 CE_{23}	—	February 10, 1999	Socorro	LINEAR	·	1.9 km	MPC · JPL
468419	1999 TV_{20}	—	October 7, 1999	Goodricke-Pigott	R. A. Tucker	·	1.8 km	MPC · JPL
468420	1999 TS_{130}	—	October 6, 1999	Socorro	LINEAR	·	1.5 km	MPC · JPL
468421	1999 VP_{46}	—	November 3, 1999	Socorro	LINEAR	H	450 m	MPC · JPL
468422	2000 FA_{8}	—	March 27, 2000	Mauna Kea	J. J. Kavelaars, B. Gladman, Petit, J.-M., M. J. Holman	cubewano (cold)	108 km	MPC · JPL
468423	2000 KZ_{39}	—	May 25, 2000	Kitt Peak	Spacewatch	·	1.7 km	MPC · JPL
468424	2000 QL_{216}	—	August 31, 2000	Socorro	LINEAR	·	1.1 km	MPC · JPL
468425	2000 UD_{34}	—	October 7, 2000	Kitt Peak	Spacewatch	·	1.9 km	MPC · JPL
468426	2000 US_{64}	—	October 25, 2000	Socorro	LINEAR	(5)	1.1 km	MPC · JPL
468427	2000 WB_{151}	—	November 20, 2000	Socorro	LINEAR	·	2.5 km	MPC · JPL
468428	2001 PL_{36}	—	August 11, 2001	Palomar	NEAT	·	2.1 km	MPC · JPL
468429	2001 RQ_{112}	—	September 12, 2001	Socorro	LINEAR	·	3.2 km	MPC · JPL
468430	2001 RO_{125}	—	September 12, 2001	Socorro	LINEAR	·	1.2 km	MPC · JPL
468431	2001 SL_{32}	—	September 16, 2001	Socorro	LINEAR	·	1 km	MPC · JPL
468432	2001 SN_{301}	—	September 20, 2001	Socorro	LINEAR	·	2.1 km	MPC · JPL
468433	2001 TZ_{143}	—	October 10, 2001	Palomar	NEAT	·	2.9 km	MPC · JPL
468434	2001 UZ_{15}	—	October 17, 2001	Socorro	LINEAR	PHO	1.2 km	MPC · JPL
468435	2001 UK_{199}	—	October 19, 2001	Haleakala	NEAT	·	1.3 km	MPC · JPL
468436	2001 WO_{4}	—	November 19, 2001	Socorro	LINEAR	·	470 m	MPC · JPL
468437	2001 XX_{187}	—	December 10, 2001	Kitt Peak	Spacewatch	·	1.8 km	MPC · JPL
468438	2001 XJ_{217}	—	December 14, 2001	Socorro	LINEAR	·	2.1 km	MPC · JPL
468439	2002 AX_{17}	—	January 12, 2002	Socorro	LINEAR	H	620 m	MPC · JPL
468440	2002 AE_{194}	—	January 12, 2002	Kitt Peak	Spacewatch	·	1.7 km	MPC · JPL
468441	2002 ON_{24}	—	July 18, 2002	Socorro	LINEAR	·	950 m	MPC · JPL
468442	2002 QK_{61}	—	August 18, 2002	Palomar	NEAT	·	2.2 km	MPC · JPL
468443	2002 QE_{137}	—	August 16, 2002	Palomar	NEAT	·	940 m	MPC · JPL
468444	2002 RZ_{210}	—	September 15, 2002	Kitt Peak	Spacewatch	·	1.7 km	MPC · JPL
468445	2002 SS_{28}	—	September 30, 2002	Socorro	LINEAR	H	550 m	MPC · JPL
468446	2002 XX_{4}	—	December 5, 2002	Socorro	LINEAR	AMO	360 m	MPC · JPL
468447	2003 EW_{15}	—	March 7, 2003	Palomar	NEAT	·	1.0 km	MPC · JPL
468448	2003 LS_{3}	—	June 4, 2003	Socorro	LINEAR	AMO +1km	920 m	MPC · JPL
468449	2003 MF_{1}	—	June 24, 2003	Campo Imperatore	CINEOS	·	640 m	MPC · JPL
468450	2003 OW_{16}	—	July 29, 2003	Socorro	LINEAR	·	1.2 km	MPC · JPL
468451	2003 QL_{111}	—	August 31, 2003	Socorro	LINEAR	·	2.7 km	MPC · JPL
468452	2003 SD_{170}	—	September 22, 2003	Palomar	NEAT	AMO	520 m	MPC · JPL
468453	2003 SL_{369}	—	September 26, 2003	Apache Point	SDSS	·	600 m	MPC · JPL
468454	2003 UK_{3}	—	September 2, 2003	Socorro	LINEAR	·	2.0 km	MPC · JPL
468455	2003 UW_{151}	—	October 21, 2003	Kitt Peak	Spacewatch	·	730 m	MPC · JPL
468456	2003 UQ_{365}	—	October 20, 2003	Kitt Peak	Spacewatch	·	910 m	MPC · JPL
468457	2003 WH_{7}	—	November 3, 2003	Socorro	LINEAR	H	580 m	MPC · JPL
468458	2003 WH_{14}	—	October 24, 2003	Socorro	LINEAR	·	2.2 km	MPC · JPL
468459	2003 WW_{24}	—	November 20, 2003	Socorro	LINEAR	H	620 m	MPC · JPL
468460	2003 YA	—	December 16, 2003	Desert Eagle	W. K. Y. Yeung	·	4.0 km	MPC · JPL
468461	2003 YS_{76}	—	November 24, 2003	Kitt Peak	Spacewatch	·	5.0 km	MPC · JPL
468462	2004 BS_{102}	—	January 30, 2004	Kitt Peak	Spacewatch	AMO	530 m	MPC · JPL
468463	2004 CY_{10}	—	February 11, 2004	Palomar	NEAT	THB	3.4 km	MPC · JPL
468464	2004 EL_{19}	—	March 14, 2004	Kitt Peak	Spacewatch	·	1.6 km	MPC · JPL
468465	2004 FQ_{153}	—	February 29, 2004	Kitt Peak	Spacewatch	·	2.5 km	MPC · JPL
468466	2004 JC_{21}	—	April 22, 2004	Kitt Peak	Spacewatch	·	2.9 km	MPC · JPL
468467	2004 KK_{10}	—	May 21, 2004	Socorro	LINEAR	T_{j} (2.99)	4.9 km	MPC · JPL
468468	2004 KH_{17}	—	May 29, 2004	Socorro	LINEAR	ATE · PHA	200 m	MPC · JPL
468469	2004 NS_{21}	—	July 15, 2004	Socorro	LINEAR	·	1.7 km	MPC · JPL
468470	2004 QB_{20}	—	August 23, 2004	Goodricke-Pigott	Goodricke-Pigott	·	1.3 km	MPC · JPL
468471	2004 RU_{79}	—	September 7, 2004	Socorro	LINEAR	·	1.6 km	MPC · JPL
468472	2004 RC_{110}	—	September 10, 2004	Socorro	LINEAR	·	2.2 km	MPC · JPL
468473	2004 RV_{153}	—	September 10, 2004	Socorro	LINEAR	·	1.2 km	MPC · JPL
468474	2004 RG_{200}	—	September 10, 2004	Socorro	LINEAR	·	1.9 km	MPC · JPL
468475	2004 RK_{202}	—	September 11, 2004	Socorro	LINEAR	KON	2.5 km	MPC · JPL
468476	2004 RW_{218}	—	September 11, 2004	Socorro	LINEAR	·	2.0 km	MPC · JPL
468477	2004 RV_{235}	—	September 10, 2004	Socorro	LINEAR	·	1.5 km	MPC · JPL
468478	2004 RJ_{309}	—	September 13, 2004	Socorro	LINEAR	·	1.4 km	MPC · JPL
468479	2004 RF_{332}	—	September 14, 2004	Palomar	NEAT	(1547)	1.6 km	MPC · JPL
468480	2004 TU_{7}	—	October 5, 2004	Socorro	LINEAR	·	1.8 km	MPC · JPL
468481	2004 TP_{20}	—	October 15, 2004	Socorro	LINEAR	APO	350 m	MPC · JPL
468482	2004 TO_{97}	—	October 5, 2004	Kitt Peak	Spacewatch	EUN	900 m	MPC · JPL
468483	2004 TV_{139}	—	October 9, 2004	Anderson Mesa	LONEOS	JUN	910 m	MPC · JPL
468484	2004 TM_{280}	—	October 10, 2004	Palomar	NEAT	·	1.7 km	MPC · JPL
468485	2004 TX_{327}	—	October 4, 2004	Palomar	NEAT	·	2.1 km	MPC · JPL
468486	2004 WZ_{11}	—	November 19, 2004	Socorro	LINEAR	·	2.0 km	MPC · JPL
468487	2004 XB_{61}	—	December 9, 2004	Catalina	CSS	·	2.6 km	MPC · JPL
468488	2004 XS_{160}	—	December 14, 2004	Kitt Peak	Spacewatch	·	2.3 km	MPC · JPL
468489	2005 AC_{25}	—	January 7, 2005	Campo Imperatore	CINEOS	·	2.6 km	MPC · JPL
468490	2005 FV_{14}	—	March 16, 2005	Catalina	CSS	·	2.6 km	MPC · JPL
468491	2005 GB_{44}	—	March 9, 2005	Kitt Peak	Spacewatch	·	900 m	MPC · JPL
468492	2005 GB_{49}	—	April 5, 2005	Mount Lemmon	Mount Lemmon Survey	·	2.2 km	MPC · JPL
468493	2005 GT_{89}	—	April 5, 2005	Mount Lemmon	Mount Lemmon Survey	V	540 m	MPC · JPL
468494	2005 GY_{128}	—	April 11, 2005	Catalina	CSS	·	880 m	MPC · JPL
468495	2005 GN_{132}	—	April 10, 2005	Kitt Peak	Spacewatch	MAS	630 m	MPC · JPL
468496	2005 GM_{138}	—	April 12, 2005	Kitt Peak	Spacewatch	·	2.1 km	MPC · JPL
468497	2005 HR_{2}	—	April 7, 2005	Kitt Peak	Spacewatch	·	980 m	MPC · JPL
468498	2005 JX_{50}	—	May 4, 2005	Kitt Peak	Spacewatch	MAS	630 m	MPC · JPL
468499	2005 JH_{52}	—	May 4, 2005	Kitt Peak	Spacewatch	·	1.1 km	MPC · JPL
468500	2005 JR_{108}	—	May 6, 2005	Kitt Peak	Deep Lens Survey	·	2.6 km	MPC · JPL

== 468501–468600 ==
back to top

Designation			Discovery			Properties		Ref
Permanent	Provisional	Named after	Date	Site	Discoverer(s)	Category	Diam.	Ref
468501	2005 JY_{184}	—	May 10, 2005	Kitt Peak	Spacewatch	·	1.2 km	MPC · JPL
468502	2005 LQ_{17}	—	June 6, 2005	Kitt Peak	Spacewatch	V	520 m	MPC · JPL
468503	2005 LF_{28}	—	June 9, 2005	Kitt Peak	Spacewatch	·	3.5 km	MPC · JPL
468504	2005 LC_{38}	—	June 11, 2005	Kitt Peak	Spacewatch	·	2.7 km	MPC · JPL
468505	2005 LC_{52}	—	June 15, 2005	Mount Lemmon	Mount Lemmon Survey	THB	3.5 km	MPC · JPL
468506	2005 MA_{30}	—	June 29, 2005	Kitt Peak	Spacewatch	·	3.0 km	MPC · JPL
468507	2005 NB_{6}	—	July 4, 2005	Socorro	LINEAR	·	2.3 km	MPC · JPL
468508	2005 NZ_{40}	—	July 3, 2005	Mount Lemmon	Mount Lemmon Survey	·	850 m	MPC · JPL
468509	2005 NP_{125}	—	December 23, 2001	Kitt Peak	Spacewatch	·	3.8 km	MPC · JPL
468510	2005 QM_{51}	—	August 26, 2005	Campo Imperatore	CINEOS	·	2.6 km	MPC · JPL
468511	2005 QO_{142}	—	August 30, 2005	Campo Imperatore	CINEOS	PHO	1.0 km	MPC · JPL
468512	2005 QJ_{170}	—	August 29, 2005	Palomar	NEAT	·	2.9 km	MPC · JPL
468513	2005 RW_{18}	—	September 1, 2005	Kitt Peak	Spacewatch	·	1.1 km	MPC · JPL
468514	2005 RE_{21}	—	September 3, 2005	Goodricke-Pigott	R. A. Tucker	TIR	3.4 km	MPC · JPL
468515	2005 SC_{57}	—	September 26, 2005	Kitt Peak	Spacewatch	NYS	1.1 km	MPC · JPL
468516	2005 SE_{110}	—	September 26, 2005	Kitt Peak	Spacewatch	·	1.1 km	MPC · JPL
468517	2005 TV_{28}	—	October 2, 2005	Palomar	NEAT	·	3.7 km	MPC · JPL
468518	2005 TM_{122}	—	September 26, 2005	Kitt Peak	Spacewatch	CYB	3.7 km	MPC · JPL
468519	2005 TT_{174}	—	October 1, 2005	Catalina	CSS	·	3.2 km	MPC · JPL
468520	2005 UW_{106}	—	October 22, 2005	Kitt Peak	Spacewatch	·	2.0 km	MPC · JPL
468521	2005 UT_{157}	—	October 27, 2005	Bergisch Gladbach	W. Bickel	·	1.1 km	MPC · JPL
468522	2005 UH_{199}	—	October 25, 2005	Mount Lemmon	Mount Lemmon Survey	·	1.1 km	MPC · JPL
468523	2005 UP_{211}	—	October 27, 2005	Kitt Peak	Spacewatch	·	1.4 km	MPC · JPL
468524	2005 UM_{413}	—	October 25, 2005	Kitt Peak	Spacewatch	JUN	830 m	MPC · JPL
468525	2005 WX_{143}	—	November 25, 2005	Mount Lemmon	Mount Lemmon Survey	·	1.7 km	MPC · JPL
468526	2005 YM_{34}	—	December 24, 2005	Kitt Peak	Spacewatch	EUN	1.2 km	MPC · JPL
468527	2005 YA_{62}	—	December 24, 2005	Kitt Peak	Spacewatch	·	1.8 km	MPC · JPL
468528	2005 YO_{93}	—	December 26, 2005	Kitt Peak	Spacewatch	·	2.2 km	MPC · JPL
468529	2005 YN_{192}	—	December 30, 2005	Kitt Peak	Spacewatch	MRX	900 m	MPC · JPL
468530	2005 YR_{245}	—	December 30, 2005	Kitt Peak	Spacewatch	·	4.0 km	MPC · JPL
468531	2005 YA_{288}	—	December 30, 2005	Catalina	CSS	·	1.9 km	MPC · JPL
468532	2006 AJ_{81}	—	January 5, 2006	Catalina	CSS	·	2.3 km	MPC · JPL
468533	2006 BN_{50}	—	January 25, 2006	Kitt Peak	Spacewatch	·	2.3 km	MPC · JPL
468534	2006 BS_{180}	—	January 27, 2006	Mount Lemmon	Mount Lemmon Survey	·	1.8 km	MPC · JPL
468535	2006 BG_{233}	—	January 31, 2006	Kitt Peak	Spacewatch	·	1.5 km	MPC · JPL
468536	2006 ES_{47}	—	March 4, 2006	Kitt Peak	Spacewatch	·	780 m	MPC · JPL
468537	2006 GN_{17}	—	April 2, 2006	Kitt Peak	Spacewatch	·	1.9 km	MPC · JPL
468538	2006 HL_{93}	—	April 29, 2006	Kitt Peak	Spacewatch	·	1.9 km	MPC · JPL
468539	2006 KA_{75}	—	May 23, 2006	Kitt Peak	Spacewatch	·	4.0 km	MPC · JPL
468540	2006 MD_{12}	—	June 20, 2006	Mount Lemmon	Mount Lemmon Survey	ATE	460 m	MPC · JPL
468541	2006 QA_{31}	—	August 23, 2006	Siding Spring	SSS	APO	350 m	MPC · JPL
468542	2006 QZ_{52}	—	July 22, 2006	Mount Lemmon	Mount Lemmon Survey	·	3.3 km	MPC · JPL
468543	2006 RS_{3}	—	July 1, 2006	Catalina	CSS	·	1.1 km	MPC · JPL
468544	2006 SO_{23}	—	September 18, 2006	Catalina	CSS	·	840 m	MPC · JPL
468545	2006 SS_{71}	—	September 19, 2006	Kitt Peak	Spacewatch	THM	2.4 km	MPC · JPL
468546	2006 SU_{99}	—	September 18, 2006	Kitt Peak	Spacewatch	EOS	1.9 km	MPC · JPL
468547	2006 SA_{135}	—	September 20, 2006	Palomar	NEAT	·	730 m	MPC · JPL
468548	2006 SH_{141}	—	September 25, 2006	Anderson Mesa	LONEOS	·	3.3 km	MPC · JPL
468549	2006 SK_{213}	—	September 27, 2006	Catalina	CSS	·	3.0 km	MPC · JPL
468550	2006 SE_{320}	—	September 27, 2006	Kitt Peak	Spacewatch	·	3.4 km	MPC · JPL
468551	2006 SB_{337}	—	September 28, 2006	Kitt Peak	Spacewatch	·	1.5 km	MPC · JPL
468552	2006 SW_{396}	—	September 18, 2006	Kitt Peak	Spacewatch	THM	2.0 km	MPC · JPL
468553	2006 TN_{11}	—	October 2, 2006	Mount Lemmon	Mount Lemmon Survey	·	870 m	MPC · JPL
468554	2006 TF_{51}	—	October 12, 2006	Kitt Peak	Spacewatch	·	4.5 km	MPC · JPL
468555	2006 UB_{15}	—	October 17, 2006	Mount Lemmon	Mount Lemmon Survey	·	1.0 km	MPC · JPL
468556	2006 UY_{37}	—	October 16, 2006	Kitt Peak	Spacewatch	·	3.3 km	MPC · JPL
468557	2006 UY_{106}	—	October 3, 2006	Mount Lemmon	Mount Lemmon Survey	·	4.5 km	MPC · JPL
468558	2006 UW_{127}	—	October 2, 2006	Mount Lemmon	Mount Lemmon Survey	TIR	2.4 km	MPC · JPL
468559	2006 UB_{136}	—	September 30, 2006	Mount Lemmon	Mount Lemmon Survey	·	2.4 km	MPC · JPL
468560	2006 UD_{335}	—	October 16, 2006	Kitt Peak	Spacewatch	CYB	4.0 km	MPC · JPL
468561	2006 VV_{100}	—	October 12, 2006	Kitt Peak	Spacewatch	·	880 m	MPC · JPL
468562	2006 VZ_{134}	—	October 20, 2006	Mount Lemmon	Mount Lemmon Survey	·	2.9 km	MPC · JPL
468563	2006 VZ_{148}	—	November 1, 2006	Catalina	CSS	H	550 m	MPC · JPL
468564	2006 WZ_{134}	—	November 18, 2006	Catalina	CSS	H	660 m	MPC · JPL
468565	2006 WN_{183}	—	November 2, 2006	Catalina	CSS	H	680 m	MPC · JPL
468566	2006 WA_{185}	—	November 22, 2006	Kitt Peak	Spacewatch	H	680 m	MPC · JPL
468567	2006 WQ_{205}	—	November 24, 2006	Mount Lemmon	Mount Lemmon Survey	H	430 m	MPC · JPL
468568	2006 XD_{3}	—	December 13, 2006	Socorro	LINEAR	H	580 m	MPC · JPL
468569	2006 XJ_{17}	—	December 10, 2006	Kitt Peak	Spacewatch	·	3.8 km	MPC · JPL
468570	2006 YS_{25}	—	December 21, 2006	Kitt Peak	Spacewatch	·	1.0 km	MPC · JPL
468571	2007 DW_{71}	—	February 21, 2007	Kitt Peak	Spacewatch	·	1.2 km	MPC · JPL
468572	2007 EB_{57}	—	January 28, 2007	Mount Lemmon	Mount Lemmon Survey	·	1.9 km	MPC · JPL
468573	2007 ER_{145}	—	February 26, 2007	Mount Lemmon	Mount Lemmon Survey	·	1.1 km	MPC · JPL
468574	2007 EH_{155}	—	March 12, 2007	Kitt Peak	Spacewatch	MAR	1.1 km	MPC · JPL
468575	2007 EF_{193}	—	February 8, 2007	Kitt Peak	Spacewatch	·	1.3 km	MPC · JPL
468576	2007 FB_{40}	—	March 12, 2007	Catalina	CSS	·	1.9 km	MPC · JPL
468577	2007 GZ_{37}	—	March 13, 2007	Mount Lemmon	Mount Lemmon Survey	·	1.7 km	MPC · JPL
468578	2007 HD_{79}	—	April 23, 2007	Catalina	CSS	·	2.4 km	MPC · JPL
468579	2007 HB_{87}	—	April 24, 2007	Kitt Peak	Spacewatch	·	1.7 km	MPC · JPL
468580	2007 JJ_{9}	—	April 15, 2007	Catalina	CSS	·	1.9 km	MPC · JPL
468581 Maiajasperwhite	2007 JW_{33}	Maiajasperwhite	May 11, 2007	Lulin	Q. Ye, H.-C. Lin	·	1.9 km	MPC · JPL
468582	2007 JR_{38}	—	May 13, 2007	Mount Lemmon	Mount Lemmon Survey	MIS	2.5 km	MPC · JPL
468583	2007 LS	—	June 8, 2007	Kitt Peak	Spacewatch	T_{j} (2.98) · APO +1km	880 m	MPC · JPL
468584	2007 LN_{11}	—	May 26, 2007	Mount Lemmon	Mount Lemmon Survey	·	1.4 km	MPC · JPL
468585	2007 LH_{26}	—	June 14, 2007	Kitt Peak	Spacewatch	·	2.2 km	MPC · JPL
468586	2007 RR_{49}	—	September 9, 2007	Mount Lemmon	Mount Lemmon Survey	EOS	1.6 km	MPC · JPL
468587	2007 RS_{132}	—	September 4, 2007	Catalina	CSS	·	2.3 km	MPC · JPL
468588	2007 RA_{189}	—	June 15, 2007	Kitt Peak	Spacewatch	(18466)	2.5 km	MPC · JPL
468589	2007 RF_{271}	—	September 15, 2007	Kitt Peak	Spacewatch	·	2.8 km	MPC · JPL
468590	2007 RP_{290}	—	September 10, 2007	Mount Lemmon	Mount Lemmon Survey	·	2.4 km	MPC · JPL
468591	2007 RR_{299}	—	September 12, 2007	Mount Lemmon	Mount Lemmon Survey	·	2.1 km	MPC · JPL
468592	2007 TX_{195}	—	October 7, 2007	Mount Lemmon	Mount Lemmon Survey	EOS	1.5 km	MPC · JPL
468593	2007 TT_{301}	—	October 12, 2007	Kitt Peak	Spacewatch	·	610 m	MPC · JPL
468594	2007 TX_{369}	—	October 11, 2007	Goodricke-Pigott	R. A. Tucker	·	3.2 km	MPC · JPL
468595	2007 TU_{405}	—	October 15, 2007	Kitt Peak	Spacewatch	·	2.1 km	MPC · JPL
468596	2007 UR_{22}	—	October 16, 2007	Kitt Peak	Spacewatch	·	570 m	MPC · JPL
468597	2007 UD_{49}	—	October 21, 2007	Kitt Peak	Spacewatch	EMA	2.6 km	MPC · JPL
468598	2007 UG_{111}	—	April 11, 2005	Mount Lemmon	Mount Lemmon Survey	·	2.3 km	MPC · JPL
468599	2007 UF_{121}	—	October 30, 2007	Mount Lemmon	Mount Lemmon Survey	·	2.3 km	MPC · JPL
468600	2007 UF_{138}	—	October 20, 2007	Catalina	CSS	·	3.8 km	MPC · JPL

== 468601–468700 ==
back to top

Designation			Discovery			Properties		Ref
Permanent	Provisional	Named after	Date	Site	Discoverer(s)	Category	Diam.	Ref
468601	2007 VX_{125}	—	October 9, 2007	Catalina	CSS	·	1.8 km	MPC · JPL
468602	2007 VQ_{138}	—	September 15, 2007	Mount Lemmon	Mount Lemmon Survey	·	4.0 km	MPC · JPL
468603	2007 VE_{164}	—	November 5, 2007	Kitt Peak	Spacewatch	·	4.7 km	MPC · JPL
468604	2007 VA_{254}	—	November 14, 2007	Kitt Peak	Spacewatch	·	2.7 km	MPC · JPL
468605	2007 VB_{261}	—	September 26, 2006	Kitt Peak	Spacewatch	EOS	1.8 km	MPC · JPL
468606	2007 VW_{267}	—	November 9, 2007	Socorro	LINEAR	·	3.6 km	MPC · JPL
468607	2007 VO_{296}	—	November 15, 2007	Catalina	CSS	PHO	1.0 km	MPC · JPL
468608	2007 WN_{12}	—	November 17, 2007	Catalina	CSS	·	3.2 km	MPC · JPL
468609	2007 XM_{1}	—	November 8, 2007	Catalina	CSS	PHO	950 m	MPC · JPL
468610	2007 YK_{13}	—	November 11, 2007	Mount Lemmon	Mount Lemmon Survey	EOS	1.8 km	MPC · JPL
468611	2007 YT_{34}	—	December 28, 2007	Kitt Peak	Spacewatch	H	460 m	MPC · JPL
468612	2007 YQ_{70}	—	December 30, 2007	Mount Lemmon	Mount Lemmon Survey	·	920 m	MPC · JPL
468613	2008 AM_{83}	—	December 28, 2007	Kitt Peak	Spacewatch	V	560 m	MPC · JPL
468614	2008 AB_{87}	—	December 15, 2007	Kitt Peak	Spacewatch	·	690 m	MPC · JPL
468615	2008 BB	—	December 31, 2007	Kitt Peak	Spacewatch	H	520 m	MPC · JPL
468616	2008 DL_{46}	—	February 10, 2008	Mount Lemmon	Mount Lemmon Survey	·	1.1 km	MPC · JPL
468617	2008 EM_{86}	—	February 28, 2008	Kitt Peak	Spacewatch	·	930 m	MPC · JPL
468618	2008 EW_{151}	—	March 10, 2008	Kitt Peak	Spacewatch	MAS	600 m	MPC · JPL
468619	2008 EC_{165}	—	March 11, 2008	XuYi	PMO NEO Survey Program	·	1.2 km	MPC · JPL
468620	2008 FW_{25}	—	March 1, 2008	Kitt Peak	Spacewatch	·	1.0 km	MPC · JPL
468621	2008 FB_{45}	—	March 28, 2008	Mount Lemmon	Mount Lemmon Survey	·	1 km	MPC · JPL
468622	2008 FN_{97}	—	February 12, 2008	Kitt Peak	Spacewatch	MAS	680 m	MPC · JPL
468623	2008 GU_{111}	—	April 9, 2008	Socorro	LINEAR	·	1.9 km	MPC · JPL
468624	2008 HN_{7}	—	April 24, 2008	Kitt Peak	Spacewatch	·	1.2 km	MPC · JPL
468625	2008 HW_{18}	—	April 26, 2008	Mount Lemmon	Mount Lemmon Survey	·	1.2 km	MPC · JPL
468626	2008 KB_{16}	—	April 30, 2008	Mount Lemmon	Mount Lemmon Survey	·	850 m	MPC · JPL
468627	2008 OD_{17}	—	July 29, 2008	Kitt Peak	Spacewatch	ADE	1.6 km	MPC · JPL
468628	2008 OG_{18}	—	July 30, 2008	Kitt Peak	Spacewatch	·	1.8 km	MPC · JPL
468629	2008 PH_{10}	—	August 5, 2008	La Sagra	OAM	·	890 m	MPC · JPL
468630	2008 RZ_{32}	—	September 2, 2008	Kitt Peak	Spacewatch	·	1.4 km	MPC · JPL
468631	2008 RW_{34}	—	September 2, 2008	Kitt Peak	Spacewatch	·	1.2 km	MPC · JPL
468632	2008 RC_{80}	—	September 13, 2008	La Cañada	Lacruz, J.	·	1.7 km	MPC · JPL
468633	2008 SP_{4}	—	August 22, 2008	Kitt Peak	Spacewatch	·	1.6 km	MPC · JPL
468634	2008 SB_{12}	—	September 23, 2008	Catalina	CSS	·	2.0 km	MPC · JPL
468635	2008 SB_{31}	—	September 20, 2008	Kitt Peak	Spacewatch	·	1.2 km	MPC · JPL
468636	2008 SJ_{92}	—	September 9, 2008	Mount Lemmon	Mount Lemmon Survey	·	2.1 km	MPC · JPL
468637	2008 SD_{95}	—	September 21, 2008	Kitt Peak	Spacewatch	·	800 m	MPC · JPL
468638	2008 SW_{220}	—	September 9, 2008	Mount Lemmon	Mount Lemmon Survey	·	2.2 km	MPC · JPL
468639	2008 SV_{226}	—	September 28, 2008	Mount Lemmon	Mount Lemmon Survey	L4	7.3 km	MPC · JPL
468640	2008 SM_{285}	—	September 20, 2008	Mount Lemmon	Mount Lemmon Survey	·	2.4 km	MPC · JPL
468641	2008 SZ_{299}	—	September 22, 2008	Catalina	CSS	·	1.6 km	MPC · JPL
468642	2008 TM_{6}	—	September 7, 2008	Catalina	CSS	·	2.0 km	MPC · JPL
468643	2008 TU_{42}	—	October 1, 2008	Mount Lemmon	Mount Lemmon Survey	·	2.4 km	MPC · JPL
468644	2008 TX_{78}	—	September 2, 2008	Kitt Peak	Spacewatch	·	1.4 km	MPC · JPL
468645	2008 TF_{136}	—	October 8, 2008	Kitt Peak	Spacewatch	·	2.6 km	MPC · JPL
468646	2008 TS_{146}	—	September 2, 2008	Kitt Peak	Spacewatch	·	1.9 km	MPC · JPL
468647	2008 UC_{4}	—	October 23, 2008	Socorro	LINEAR	·	2.0 km	MPC · JPL
468648	2008 UL_{31}	—	October 20, 2008	Kitt Peak	Spacewatch	GEF	900 m	MPC · JPL
468649	2008 UV_{41}	—	October 20, 2008	Kitt Peak	Spacewatch	·	2.2 km	MPC · JPL
468650	2008 UH_{73}	—	September 3, 2008	Kitt Peak	Spacewatch	·	2.1 km	MPC · JPL
468651	2008 UH_{161}	—	October 24, 2008	Kitt Peak	Spacewatch	·	1.5 km	MPC · JPL
468652	2008 UT_{176}	—	September 26, 2008	Kitt Peak	Spacewatch	·	1.6 km	MPC · JPL
468653	2008 UF_{186}	—	October 24, 2008	Kitt Peak	Spacewatch	·	1.9 km	MPC · JPL
468654	2008 UJ_{214}	—	October 24, 2008	Catalina	CSS	·	2.3 km	MPC · JPL
468655	2008 UF_{226}	—	October 25, 2008	Catalina	CSS	·	2.0 km	MPC · JPL
468656	2008 UY_{355}	—	October 29, 2008	Mount Lemmon	Mount Lemmon Survey	·	2.0 km	MPC · JPL
468657	2008 UO_{361}	—	October 31, 2008	Catalina	CSS	·	3.3 km	MPC · JPL
468658	2008 VD_{35}	—	November 2, 2008	Mount Lemmon	Mount Lemmon Survey	·	1.4 km	MPC · JPL
468659	2008 WO_{23}	—	November 2, 2008	Socorro	LINEAR	·	2.6 km	MPC · JPL
468660	2008 WS_{78}	—	November 20, 2008	Kitt Peak	Spacewatch	·	1.8 km	MPC · JPL
468661	2008 WX_{87}	—	November 21, 2008	Mount Lemmon	Mount Lemmon Survey	AGN	1.1 km	MPC · JPL
468662	2008 WP_{103}	—	October 22, 2008	Kitt Peak	Spacewatch	·	1.5 km	MPC · JPL
468663	2008 WG_{136}	—	November 19, 2008	Kitt Peak	Spacewatch	·	2.8 km	MPC · JPL
468664	2008 XU_{11}	—	November 19, 2008	Kitt Peak	Spacewatch	EOS	1.8 km	MPC · JPL
468665	2008 XX_{30}	—	October 29, 2008	Kitt Peak	Spacewatch	·	2.0 km	MPC · JPL
468666	2008 YF_{48}	—	December 29, 2008	Mount Lemmon	Mount Lemmon Survey	EOS	1.7 km	MPC · JPL
468667	2008 YD_{66}	—	October 26, 2008	Mount Lemmon	Mount Lemmon Survey	·	3.2 km	MPC · JPL
468668	2008 YJ_{152}	—	December 22, 2008	Kitt Peak	Spacewatch	·	2.7 km	MPC · JPL
468669	2009 AT_{11}	—	November 21, 2008	Mount Lemmon	Mount Lemmon Survey	·	3.3 km	MPC · JPL
468670	2009 AL_{31}	—	January 15, 2009	Kitt Peak	Spacewatch	·	1.5 km	MPC · JPL
468671	2009 AL_{50}	—	November 3, 2008	Kitt Peak	Spacewatch	·	3.5 km	MPC · JPL
468672	2009 BH_{118}	—	December 22, 2008	Kitt Peak	Spacewatch	·	3.1 km	MPC · JPL
468673	2009 BT_{175}	—	January 29, 2009	Mount Lemmon	Mount Lemmon Survey	·	2.5 km	MPC · JPL
468674	2009 CL_{64}	—	February 3, 2009	Kitt Peak	Spacewatch	·	3.1 km	MPC · JPL
468675	2009 DB_{3}	—	February 17, 2009	Calar Alto	F. Hormuth	EOS	1.6 km	MPC · JPL
468676	2009 DF_{126}	—	February 19, 2009	Kitt Peak	Spacewatch	·	800 m	MPC · JPL
468677	2009 FT_{49}	—	September 25, 2006	Mount Lemmon	Mount Lemmon Survey	EOS	2.0 km	MPC · JPL
468678	2009 KF_{15}	—	May 26, 2009	Catalina	CSS	·	690 m	MPC · JPL
468679	2009 KE_{28}	—	May 1, 2009	Mount Lemmon	Mount Lemmon Survey	·	730 m	MPC · JPL
468680	2009 MP_{6}	—	June 22, 2009	Mount Lemmon	Mount Lemmon Survey	NYS	1.0 km	MPC · JPL
468681	2009 MZ_{6}	—	June 25, 2009	Purple Mountain	PMO NEO Survey Program	AMO	280 m	MPC · JPL
468682	2009 OS_{15}	—	July 28, 2009	Kitt Peak	Spacewatch	·	1.1 km	MPC · JPL
468683	2009 PF_{21}	—	June 24, 2009	Mount Lemmon	Mount Lemmon Survey	NYS	1.0 km	MPC · JPL
468684	2009 QY_{33}	—	August 27, 2009	La Sagra	OAM	AMO	420 m	MPC · JPL
468685	2009 QW_{58}	—	August 29, 2009	Kitt Peak	Spacewatch	·	950 m	MPC · JPL
468686	2009 RR_{10}	—	September 12, 2009	Kitt Peak	Spacewatch	·	830 m	MPC · JPL
468687	2009 SL_{103}	—	December 13, 1999	Catalina	CSS	H	540 m	MPC · JPL
468688	2009 SC_{168}	—	October 7, 2005	Catalina	CSS	·	1.1 km	MPC · JPL
468689	2009 SA_{234}	—	September 23, 2009	Kitt Peak	Spacewatch	·	950 m	MPC · JPL
468690	2009 SG_{271}	—	September 24, 2009	Kitt Peak	Spacewatch	·	1.5 km	MPC · JPL
468691	2009 ST_{353}	—	September 29, 2009	Mount Lemmon	Mount Lemmon Survey	·	1.5 km	MPC · JPL
468692	2009 UC_{65}	—	September 21, 2009	Kitt Peak	Spacewatch	·	840 m	MPC · JPL
468693	2009 UF_{107}	—	March 19, 2007	Mount Lemmon	Mount Lemmon Survey	·	2.3 km	MPC · JPL
468694	2009 UZ_{114}	—	September 12, 2009	Kitt Peak	Spacewatch	L4	8.4 km	MPC · JPL
468695	2009 UX_{134}	—	October 23, 2009	Kitt Peak	Spacewatch	·	2.5 km	MPC · JPL
468696	2009 VF_{12}	—	November 8, 2009	Mount Lemmon	Mount Lemmon Survey	·	1.3 km	MPC · JPL
468697	2009 VZ_{112}	—	November 9, 2009	Kitt Peak	Spacewatch	·	2.0 km	MPC · JPL
468698	2009 WY_{42}	—	November 17, 2009	Catalina	CSS	·	2.4 km	MPC · JPL
468699	2009 WK_{75}	—	November 18, 2009	Kitt Peak	Spacewatch	·	2.0 km	MPC · JPL
468700	2009 WK_{96}	—	August 10, 2007	Kitt Peak	Spacewatch	L4	6.6 km	MPC · JPL

== 468701–468800 ==
back to top

Designation			Discovery			Properties		Ref
Permanent	Provisional	Named after	Date	Site	Discoverer(s)	Category	Diam.	Ref
468701	2009 WP_{113}	—	January 18, 2008	Kitt Peak	Spacewatch	·	2.1 km	MPC · JPL
468702	2009 WY_{213}	—	November 19, 2009	Catalina	CSS	·	4.4 km	MPC · JPL
468703	2009 YO_{25}	—	December 20, 2009	Kitt Peak	Spacewatch	ADE	2.2 km	MPC · JPL
468704	2010 AL_{9}	—	January 6, 2010	Kitt Peak	Spacewatch	·	1.6 km	MPC · JPL
468705	2010 BZ_{12}	—	January 16, 2010	WISE	WISE	T_{j} (2.98)	2.4 km	MPC · JPL
468706	2010 BP_{35}	—	January 18, 2010	WISE	WISE	·	3.9 km	MPC · JPL
468707	2010 BP_{78}	—	January 25, 2010	WISE	WISE	·	3.3 km	MPC · JPL
468708	2010 BA_{95}	—	January 27, 2010	WISE	WISE	·	3.6 km	MPC · JPL
468709	2010 CB_{2}	—	January 8, 2010	Catalina	CSS	H	560 m	MPC · JPL
468710	2010 CX_{15}	—	February 10, 2010	WISE	WISE	·	4.3 km	MPC · JPL
468711	2010 CW_{120}	—	December 19, 2009	Mount Lemmon	Mount Lemmon Survey	·	2.3 km	MPC · JPL
468712	2010 CM_{202}	—	February 3, 2010	WISE	WISE	·	3.1 km	MPC · JPL
468713	2010 DD_{6}	—	February 16, 2010	Mount Lemmon	Mount Lemmon Survey	·	1.6 km	MPC · JPL
468714	2010 DH_{44}	—	February 17, 2010	Kitt Peak	Spacewatch	·	2.7 km	MPC · JPL
468715	2010 DQ_{55}	—	February 21, 2010	WISE	WISE	·	4.1 km	MPC · JPL
468716	2010 EK_{80}	—	October 23, 2008	Kitt Peak	Spacewatch	·	2.2 km	MPC · JPL
468717	2010 EK_{82}	—	March 12, 2010	Mount Lemmon	Mount Lemmon Survey	THM	2.0 km	MPC · JPL
468718	2010 EW_{94}	—	March 14, 2010	Mount Lemmon	Mount Lemmon Survey	·	2.5 km	MPC · JPL
468719	2010 EP_{106}	—	March 4, 2010	Kitt Peak	Spacewatch	·	1.8 km	MPC · JPL
468720	2010 EO_{136}	—	September 11, 2007	Kitt Peak	Spacewatch	·	1.8 km	MPC · JPL
468721	2010 FT_{89}	—	March 19, 2010	Kitt Peak	Spacewatch	·	2.2 km	MPC · JPL
468722	2010 GF_{35}	—	March 18, 2010	Kitt Peak	Spacewatch	LIX	2.5 km	MPC · JPL
468723	2010 GG_{45}	—	August 30, 2005	Palomar	NEAT	·	5.5 km	MPC · JPL
468724	2010 GJ_{135}	—	April 4, 2010	Kitt Peak	Spacewatch	·	2.1 km	MPC · JPL
468725 Khalat	2010 JG_{3}	Khalat	May 5, 2010	Zelenchukskaya Stn114955	T. V. Krjačko	·	3.7 km	MPC · JPL
468726	2010 JO_{38}	—	May 5, 2010	Mount Lemmon	Mount Lemmon Survey	·	2.7 km	MPC · JPL
468727	2010 JE_{87}	—	May 10, 2010	WISE	WISE	ATE · PHA	310 m	MPC · JPL
468728	2010 KA_{127}	—	May 31, 2010	WISE	WISE	·	3.4 km	MPC · JPL
468729	2010 MT_{20}	—	May 4, 2005	Catalina	CSS	·	4.5 km	MPC · JPL
468730	2010 MN_{51}	—	June 23, 2010	Mount Lemmon	Mount Lemmon Survey	AMO	750 m	MPC · JPL
468731	2010 NA_{67}	—	December 1, 2003	Socorro	LINEAR	·	1.3 km	MPC · JPL
468732	2010 RT_{62}	—	October 11, 2007	Kitt Peak	Spacewatch	·	640 m	MPC · JPL
468733	2010 RR_{102}	—	October 15, 2007	Mount Lemmon	Mount Lemmon Survey	·	560 m	MPC · JPL
468734	2010 SY_{26}	—	September 29, 2010	Kitt Peak	Spacewatch	·	600 m	MPC · JPL
468735	2010 SG_{29}	—	October 20, 2007	Kitt Peak	Spacewatch	·	590 m	MPC · JPL
468736	2010 TV_{10}	—	October 1, 2010	Mount Lemmon	Mount Lemmon Survey	·	700 m	MPC · JPL
468737	2010 TJ_{32}	—	October 2, 2010	Kitt Peak	Spacewatch	·	780 m	MPC · JPL
468738	2010 TN_{54}	—	November 20, 2007	Mount Lemmon	Mount Lemmon Survey	AMO	470 m	MPC · JPL
468739	2010 UU_{7}	—	October 30, 2010	Kitt Peak	Spacewatch	·	860 m	MPC · JPL
468740	2010 UM_{97}	—	October 28, 2010	Mount Lemmon	Mount Lemmon Survey	·	630 m	MPC · JPL
468741	2010 VM_{1}	—	November 2, 2010	Haleakala	Pan-STARRS 1	AMO	330 m	MPC · JPL
468742	2010 VW_{51}	—	April 19, 2006	Mount Lemmon	Mount Lemmon Survey	·	540 m	MPC · JPL
468743	2010 VB_{196}	—	September 27, 2006	Mount Lemmon	Mount Lemmon Survey	·	1.3 km	MPC · JPL
468744	2011 AJ_{4}	—	March 10, 2007	Kitt Peak	Spacewatch	·	1.4 km	MPC · JPL
468745	2011 AT_{38}	—	December 21, 2006	Mount Lemmon	Mount Lemmon Survey	·	1.3 km	MPC · JPL
468746	2011 AK_{44}	—	January 10, 2011	Kitt Peak	Spacewatch	MAR	980 m	MPC · JPL
468747	2011 AC_{46}	—	January 10, 2011	Kitt Peak	Spacewatch	·	1.5 km	MPC · JPL
468748	2011 AG_{69}	—	January 11, 2002	Kitt Peak	Spacewatch	·	1.7 km	MPC · JPL
468749	2011 BZ_{8}	—	December 4, 2005	Kitt Peak	Spacewatch	·	1.8 km	MPC · JPL
468750	2011 BY_{36}	—	January 14, 2011	Kitt Peak	Spacewatch	EUN	1.1 km	MPC · JPL
468751	2011 BP_{79}	—	November 16, 2010	Mount Lemmon	Mount Lemmon Survey	JUN	1.2 km	MPC · JPL
468752	2011 CY_{94}	—	July 29, 2008	Kitt Peak	Spacewatch	·	2.2 km	MPC · JPL
468753	2011 DZ_{19}	—	April 18, 2007	Kitt Peak	Spacewatch	·	1.7 km	MPC · JPL
468754	2011 FT_{21}	—	November 26, 2009	Mount Lemmon	Mount Lemmon Survey	·	1.7 km	MPC · JPL
468755	2011 FF_{32}	—	March 28, 2011	Kitt Peak	Spacewatch	·	1.9 km	MPC · JPL
468756	2011 FF_{34}	—	January 23, 2006	Kitt Peak	Spacewatch	·	1.6 km	MPC · JPL
468757	2011 FP_{55}	—	March 29, 2011	Catalina	CSS	EUN	1.6 km	MPC · JPL
468758	2011 GD_{57}	—	January 28, 2011	Mount Lemmon	Mount Lemmon Survey	·	1.9 km	MPC · JPL
468759	2011 HZ_{67}	—	March 13, 2011	Mount Lemmon	Mount Lemmon Survey	DOR	2.0 km	MPC · JPL
468760	2011 HX_{71}	—	April 13, 2011	Mount Lemmon	Mount Lemmon Survey	·	3.1 km	MPC · JPL
468761	2011 HP_{95}	—	April 19, 2007	Mount Lemmon	Mount Lemmon Survey	·	1.4 km	MPC · JPL
468762	2011 KU_{29}	—	May 3, 2000	Socorro	LINEAR	·	2.9 km	MPC · JPL
468763	2011 LX_{5}	—	March 1, 2005	Catalina	CSS	·	3.1 km	MPC · JPL
468764	2011 MV_{5}	—	June 3, 2011	Mount Lemmon	Mount Lemmon Survey	H	730 m	MPC · JPL
468765	2011 MN_{10}	—	January 16, 2005	Kitt Peak	Spacewatch	H	520 m	MPC · JPL
468766	2011 MO_{10}	—	June 21, 2011	Kitt Peak	Spacewatch	H	450 m	MPC · JPL
468767	2011 NW_{1}	—	June 8, 2005	Kitt Peak	Spacewatch	·	3.0 km	MPC · JPL
468768	2011 OR_{38}	—	May 8, 2005	Kitt Peak	Spacewatch	·	2.3 km	MPC · JPL
468769	2011 PP_{14}	—	June 29, 2011	Kitt Peak	Spacewatch	·	2.1 km	MPC · JPL
468770	2011 QV_{31}	—	September 17, 2006	Catalina	CSS	·	5.2 km	MPC · JPL
468771	2011 SB_{22}	—	September 17, 2006	Kitt Peak	Spacewatch	EOS	1.6 km	MPC · JPL
468772	2011 SD_{226}	—	September 29, 2011	Mount Lemmon	Mount Lemmon Survey	·	2.8 km	MPC · JPL
468773	2011 SR_{249}	—	November 10, 2006	Kitt Peak	Spacewatch	·	3.5 km	MPC · JPL
468774	2011 SN_{254}	—	November 10, 2006	Kitt Peak	Spacewatch	THB	3.7 km	MPC · JPL
468775	2011 UQ_{89}	—	September 26, 2005	Catalina	CSS	·	3.2 km	MPC · JPL
468776	2011 UZ_{104}	—	September 28, 2006	Mount Lemmon	Mount Lemmon Survey	H	500 m	MPC · JPL
468777	2011 WC_{90}	—	January 17, 2005	Catalina	CSS	PHO	1.1 km	MPC · JPL
468778	2011 WY_{148}	—	December 2, 2010	Mount Lemmon	Mount Lemmon Survey	L4	8.3 km	MPC · JPL
468779	2011 YK_{33}	—	January 25, 2009	Kitt Peak	Spacewatch	·	780 m	MPC · JPL
468780	2011 YR_{58}	—	October 24, 2011	Mount Lemmon	Mount Lemmon Survey	L4	8.9 km	MPC · JPL
468781	2011 YR_{74}	—	December 31, 2011	Mount Lemmon	Mount Lemmon Survey	L4	10 km	MPC · JPL
468782	2012 AV_{21}	—	January 19, 2010	WISE	WISE	L4	8.6 km	MPC · JPL
468783	2012 BX_{4}	—	March 10, 2005	Anderson Mesa	LONEOS	·	980 m	MPC · JPL
468784	2012 BQ_{52}	—	October 17, 2007	Mount Lemmon	Mount Lemmon Survey	·	840 m	MPC · JPL
468785	2012 BZ_{53}	—	January 19, 2005	Kitt Peak	Spacewatch	V	540 m	MPC · JPL
468786	2012 BR_{58}	—	January 18, 2012	Mount Lemmon	Mount Lemmon Survey	L4	8.2 km	MPC · JPL
468787	2012 BR_{74}	—	March 13, 2005	Mount Lemmon	Mount Lemmon Survey	PHO	1.1 km	MPC · JPL
468788	2012 DU_{50}	—	August 19, 2006	Kitt Peak	Spacewatch	·	870 m	MPC · JPL
468789	2012 DV_{69}	—	January 21, 2012	Kitt Peak	Spacewatch	·	750 m	MPC · JPL
468790	2012 DD_{89}	—	November 3, 2007	Kitt Peak	Spacewatch	·	640 m	MPC · JPL
468791	2012 EO_{7}	—	March 4, 2005	Kitt Peak	Spacewatch	·	880 m	MPC · JPL
468792	2012 FG_{12}	—	May 11, 2005	Mount Lemmon	Mount Lemmon Survey	·	1.0 km	MPC · JPL
468793	2012 FC_{22}	—	February 22, 2012	Kitt Peak	Spacewatch	·	1.1 km	MPC · JPL
468794	2012 FE_{22}	—	January 13, 2008	Kitt Peak	Spacewatch	MAS	660 m	MPC · JPL
468795	2012 FM_{38}	—	September 18, 2003	Kitt Peak	Spacewatch	·	870 m	MPC · JPL
468796	2012 FD_{44}	—	January 10, 2008	Mount Lemmon	Mount Lemmon Survey	·	880 m	MPC · JPL
468797	2012 FC_{67}	—	February 22, 2012	Kitt Peak	Spacewatch	·	960 m	MPC · JPL
468798	2012 FX_{72}	—	June 11, 2005	Kitt Peak	Spacewatch	PHO	890 m	MPC · JPL
468799	2012 GH_{2}	—	January 19, 2008	Mount Lemmon	Mount Lemmon Survey	·	1.2 km	MPC · JPL
468800	2012 HV_{8}	—	April 17, 2012	Kitt Peak	Spacewatch	·	1.0 km	MPC · JPL

== 468801–468900 ==
back to top

Designation			Discovery			Properties		Ref
Permanent	Provisional	Named after	Date	Site	Discoverer(s)	Category	Diam.	Ref
468801	2012 HT_{16}	—	April 21, 2012	Kitt Peak	Spacewatch	·	2.3 km	MPC · JPL
468802	2012 HZ_{21}	—	March 27, 2012	Mount Lemmon	Mount Lemmon Survey	·	1.3 km	MPC · JPL
468803	2012 HJ_{24}	—	November 20, 2006	Kitt Peak	Spacewatch	·	1.3 km	MPC · JPL
468804	2012 HF_{52}	—	March 29, 2008	Kitt Peak	Spacewatch	·	1.1 km	MPC · JPL
468805	2012 HG_{69}	—	May 13, 2005	Mount Lemmon	Mount Lemmon Survey	PHO	840 m	MPC · JPL
468806	2012 KA_{18}	—	December 18, 2007	Mount Lemmon	Mount Lemmon Survey	·	1.2 km	MPC · JPL
468807	2012 KA_{19}	—	January 31, 2010	WISE	WISE	·	4.1 km	MPC · JPL
468808	2012 KU_{25}	—	March 29, 2012	Kitt Peak	Spacewatch	·	1.2 km	MPC · JPL
468809	2012 LE	—	May 15, 2008	Mount Lemmon	Mount Lemmon Survey	·	1.8 km	MPC · JPL
468810	2012 LB_{4}	—	September 16, 2004	Socorro	LINEAR	·	2.1 km	MPC · JPL
468811	2012 MC_{6}	—	October 3, 2005	Catalina	CSS	·	1.7 km	MPC · JPL
468812	2012 MT_{7}	—	August 11, 2004	Siding Spring	SSS	·	1.8 km	MPC · JPL
468813	2012 OT_{5}	—	July 29, 2012	Haleakala	Pan-STARRS 1	AMO	160 m	MPC · JPL
468814	2012 PQ_{39}	—	February 23, 2007	Mount Lemmon	Mount Lemmon Survey	·	1.1 km	MPC · JPL
468815	2012 QW_{50}	—	July 20, 2012	Siding Spring	SSS	·	1.7 km	MPC · JPL
468816	2012 QX_{50}	—	October 23, 2008	Kitt Peak	Spacewatch	·	1.9 km	MPC · JPL
468817	2012 SL_{14}	—	May 8, 2010	Mount Lemmon	Mount Lemmon Survey	·	3.2 km	MPC · JPL
468818	2012 SM_{16}	—	November 3, 2008	Kitt Peak	Spacewatch	·	1.3 km	MPC · JPL
468819	2012 SP_{18}	—	September 14, 2007	Mount Lemmon	Mount Lemmon Survey	·	2.2 km	MPC · JPL
468820	2012 SY_{48}	—	October 6, 2008	Mount Lemmon	Mount Lemmon Survey	·	1.7 km	MPC · JPL
468821	2012 TC_{15}	—	December 14, 2004	Catalina	CSS	·	1.7 km	MPC · JPL
468822	2012 TJ_{23}	—	April 30, 2006	Kitt Peak	Spacewatch	·	2.0 km	MPC · JPL
468823	2012 TG_{27}	—	April 21, 2006	Catalina	CSS	·	2.7 km	MPC · JPL
468824	2012 TL_{42}	—	August 8, 2007	Socorro	LINEAR	·	2.2 km	MPC · JPL
468825	2012 TL_{60}	—	September 15, 2012	Catalina	CSS	·	2.4 km	MPC · JPL
468826	2012 TL_{78}	—	December 13, 2004	Kitt Peak	Spacewatch	·	1.9 km	MPC · JPL
468827	2012 TP_{93}	—	August 24, 2007	Kitt Peak	Spacewatch	·	1.9 km	MPC · JPL
468828	2012 TS_{118}	—	September 17, 2012	Kitt Peak	Spacewatch	EOS	1.7 km	MPC · JPL
468829	2012 TK_{121}	—	September 16, 2012	Kitt Peak	Spacewatch	·	1.6 km	MPC · JPL
468830	2012 TR_{143}	—	November 7, 2008	Mount Lemmon	Mount Lemmon Survey	GEF	1.3 km	MPC · JPL
468831	2012 TR_{210}	—	November 3, 2008	Mount Lemmon	Mount Lemmon Survey	·	1.8 km	MPC · JPL
468832	2012 TO_{217}	—	January 1, 2009	Kitt Peak	Spacewatch	EOS	2.0 km	MPC · JPL
468833	2012 TM_{271}	—	November 18, 2007	Mount Lemmon	Mount Lemmon Survey	·	2.3 km	MPC · JPL
468834	2012 TH_{322}	—	April 24, 2010	WISE	WISE	·	3.3 km	MPC · JPL
468835	2012 UD_{1}	—	May 27, 2011	Kitt Peak	Spacewatch	·	2.3 km	MPC · JPL
468836	2012 UR_{8}	—	February 27, 2009	Mount Lemmon	Mount Lemmon Survey	·	2.3 km	MPC · JPL
468837	2012 UP_{27}	—	September 23, 2012	Mount Lemmon	Mount Lemmon Survey	AMO	230 m	MPC · JPL
468838	2012 UM_{31}	—	September 20, 2003	Anderson Mesa	LONEOS	JUN	980 m	MPC · JPL
468839	2012 UA_{37}	—	September 13, 2007	Catalina	CSS	·	1.9 km	MPC · JPL
468840	2012 UZ_{58}	—	October 2, 2006	Mount Lemmon	Mount Lemmon Survey	·	2.8 km	MPC · JPL
468841	2012 UQ_{85}	—	October 31, 2007	Mount Lemmon	Mount Lemmon Survey	·	2.6 km	MPC · JPL
468842	2012 UZ_{101}	—	November 20, 2001	Socorro	LINEAR	THM	2.3 km	MPC · JPL
468843	2012 VX_{6}	—	March 9, 2011	Catalina	CSS	H	640 m	MPC · JPL
468844	2012 VZ_{7}	—	April 8, 2010	Kitt Peak	Spacewatch	·	2.4 km	MPC · JPL
468845	2012 VG_{14}	—	May 8, 2005	Kitt Peak	Spacewatch	·	2.1 km	MPC · JPL
468846	2012 VK_{111}	—	October 25, 2012	Kitt Peak	Spacewatch	·	3.6 km	MPC · JPL
468847	2012 WT_{5}	—	June 21, 2011	Kitt Peak	Spacewatch	·	2.7 km	MPC · JPL
468848	2012 XM_{93}	—	November 11, 2007	Mount Lemmon	Mount Lemmon Survey	H	520 m	MPC · JPL
468849	2012 XA_{111}	—	February 2, 2008	Catalina	CSS	·	3.9 km	MPC · JPL
468850	2012 XZ_{134}	—	April 27, 2003	Anderson Mesa	LONEOS	H	560 m	MPC · JPL
468851	2013 AM_{28}	—	December 31, 2007	Mount Lemmon	Mount Lemmon Survey	·	2.4 km	MPC · JPL
468852	2013 AJ_{92}	—	October 2, 2009	Mount Lemmon	Mount Lemmon Survey	L4	10 km	MPC · JPL
468853	2013 AT_{131}	—	January 7, 2013	Kitt Peak	Spacewatch	L4	8.0 km	MPC · JPL
468854	2013 AA_{133}	—	January 5, 2013	Kitt Peak	Spacewatch	L4	6.5 km	MPC · JPL
468855	2013 AK_{133}	—	January 19, 2010	WISE	WISE	L4	10 km	MPC · JPL
468856	2013 CK_{59}	—	October 30, 2010	Kitt Peak	Spacewatch	L4	10 km	MPC · JPL
468857	2013 DD	—	February 16, 2013	Catalina	CSS	H	470 m	MPC · JPL
468858	2013 EG_{20}	—	April 7, 2008	Mount Lemmon	Mount Lemmon Survey	H	480 m	MPC · JPL
468859	2013 GY_{17}	—	April 11, 2005	Mount Lemmon	Mount Lemmon Survey	H	510 m	MPC · JPL
468860	2013 HW_{10}	—	November 13, 2006	Catalina	CSS	H	560 m	MPC · JPL
468861	2013 LU_{28}	—	June 8, 2013	Mount Lemmon	Mount Lemmon Survey	centaur	125 km	MPC · JPL
468862	2013 NG_{21}	—	October 10, 2007	Mount Lemmon	Mount Lemmon Survey	·	520 m	MPC · JPL
468863	2013 PW_{4}	—	September 2, 2010	Mount Lemmon	Mount Lemmon Survey	·	600 m	MPC · JPL
468864	2013 PM_{5}	—	February 21, 2009	Kitt Peak	Spacewatch	·	590 m	MPC · JPL
468865	2013 PM_{37}	—	November 17, 2006	Kitt Peak	Spacewatch	PHO	1.1 km	MPC · JPL
468866	2013 PB_{51}	—	October 19, 2010	Mount Lemmon	Mount Lemmon Survey	·	720 m	MPC · JPL
468867	2013 PB_{63}	—	April 2, 2006	Kitt Peak	Spacewatch	·	490 m	MPC · JPL
468868	2013 PO_{73}	—	July 21, 2006	Mount Lemmon	Mount Lemmon Survey	V	580 m	MPC · JPL
468869	2013 QJ_{49}	—	September 30, 2006	Kitt Peak	Spacewatch	·	1.2 km	MPC · JPL
468870	2013 QF_{66}	—	October 29, 2003	Kitt Peak	Spacewatch	BAP	690 m	MPC · JPL
468871	2013 QR_{75}	—	July 25, 2006	Mount Lemmon	Mount Lemmon Survey	V	430 m	MPC · JPL
468872	2013 QW_{81}	—	September 27, 2003	Kitt Peak	Spacewatch	·	580 m	MPC · JPL
468873	2013 QH_{84}	—	July 21, 2006	Mount Lemmon	Mount Lemmon Survey	·	1.1 km	MPC · JPL
468874	2013 RH_{22}	—	November 3, 2010	Mount Lemmon	Mount Lemmon Survey	·	760 m	MPC · JPL
468875	2013 RS_{31}	—	May 3, 2010	WISE	WISE	·	3.4 km	MPC · JPL
468876	2013 RA_{61}	—	November 9, 2009	Catalina	CSS	·	1.9 km	MPC · JPL
468877	2013 RM_{85}	—	September 27, 2006	Mount Lemmon	Mount Lemmon Survey	·	760 m	MPC · JPL
468878	2013 RD_{88}	—	January 4, 2006	Kitt Peak	Spacewatch	·	3.5 km	MPC · JPL
468879	2013 SW_{77}	—	November 21, 2006	Mount Lemmon	Mount Lemmon Survey	·	1.6 km	MPC · JPL
468880	2013 TW_{14}	—	May 8, 2005	Kitt Peak	Spacewatch	·	1.1 km	MPC · JPL
468881	2013 TB_{49}	—	April 2, 2006	Kitt Peak	Spacewatch	·	760 m	MPC · JPL
468882	2013 TO_{74}	—	April 6, 2005	Mount Lemmon	Mount Lemmon Survey	·	790 m	MPC · JPL
468883	2013 TZ_{132}	—	September 26, 2006	Kitt Peak	Spacewatch	·	730 m	MPC · JPL
468884	2013 UV_{9}	—	September 6, 1996	Kitt Peak	Spacewatch	·	1.3 km	MPC · JPL
468885	2013 UP_{11}	—	October 29, 2006	Catalina	CSS	PHO	1.2 km	MPC · JPL
468886	2013 VC_{7}	—	October 26, 2013	Catalina	CSS	GEF	1.2 km	MPC · JPL
468887	2013 WC_{35}	—	December 5, 2008	Kitt Peak	Spacewatch	EOS	2.0 km	MPC · JPL
468888	2013 WQ_{67}	—	August 1, 2000	Socorro	LINEAR	·	1.4 km	MPC · JPL
468889	2013 WO_{87}	—	May 10, 2006	Mount Lemmon	Mount Lemmon Survey	·	4.3 km	MPC · JPL
468890	2013 WJ_{97}	—	October 3, 2013	Mount Lemmon	Mount Lemmon Survey	·	3.3 km	MPC · JPL
468891	2013 XR_{9}	—	December 20, 2009	Mount Lemmon	Mount Lemmon Survey	·	2.6 km	MPC · JPL
468892	2013 XN_{14}	—	October 19, 2007	Catalina	CSS	EOS	1.9 km	MPC · JPL
468893	2013 YK_{24}	—	September 23, 2008	Catalina	CSS	·	2.4 km	MPC · JPL
468894	2013 YR_{29}	—	February 25, 2011	Kitt Peak	Spacewatch	·	1.1 km	MPC · JPL
468895	2013 YY_{30}	—	November 12, 2013	Mount Lemmon	Mount Lemmon Survey	·	3.8 km	MPC · JPL
468896	2013 YC_{76}	—	January 18, 2009	Mount Lemmon	Mount Lemmon Survey	EOS	2.1 km	MPC · JPL
468897	2013 YN_{92}	—	March 20, 2010	Mount Lemmon	Mount Lemmon Survey	·	1.8 km	MPC · JPL
468898	2013 YV_{109}	—	October 21, 2008	Kitt Peak	Spacewatch	·	1.7 km	MPC · JPL
468899	2013 YW_{109}	—	June 5, 2005	Kitt Peak	Spacewatch	·	4.0 km	MPC · JPL
468900	2013 YD_{113}	—	July 14, 2010	WISE	WISE	·	3.5 km	MPC · JPL

== 468901–469000 ==
back to top

Designation			Discovery			Properties		Ref
Permanent	Provisional	Named after	Date	Site	Discoverer(s)	Category	Diam.	Ref
468901	2013 YK_{113}	—	August 29, 2009	Kitt Peak	Spacewatch	·	4.3 km	MPC · JPL
468902	2014 AH_{6}	—	May 6, 2010	Kitt Peak	Spacewatch	·	3.4 km	MPC · JPL
468903	2014 AE_{31}	—	November 27, 2009	Mount Lemmon	Mount Lemmon Survey	·	1.7 km	MPC · JPL
468904	2014 AK_{39}	—	November 26, 2009	Mount Lemmon	Mount Lemmon Survey	·	1.2 km	MPC · JPL
468905	2014 AH_{42}	—	April 12, 2010	WISE	WISE	·	4.4 km	MPC · JPL
468906	2014 AB_{50}	—	September 16, 2006	Catalina	CSS	·	2.5 km	MPC · JPL
468907	2014 BC_{43}	—	August 16, 2012	Siding Spring	SSS	THB	3.3 km	MPC · JPL
468908	2014 BS_{61}	—	February 26, 2003	Campo Imperatore	CINEOS	·	3.7 km	MPC · JPL
468909	2014 KZ_{44}	—	May 24, 2014	Haleakala	Pan-STARRS 1	ATE	280 m	MPC · JPL
468910	2014 KQ_{76}	—	May 26, 2014	Haleakala	Pan-STARRS 1	APO · PHA	160 m	MPC · JPL
468911	2014 RV_{11}	—	March 10, 2005	Kitt Peak	Spacewatch	H	520 m	MPC · JPL
468912	2014 SP_{261}	—	September 17, 2006	Catalina	CSS	H	510 m	MPC · JPL
468913	2014 TB_{35}	—	September 26, 2006	Kitt Peak	Spacewatch	H	510 m	MPC · JPL
468914	2014 TN_{57}	—	October 5, 2014	Mount Lemmon	Mount Lemmon Survey	·	1.6 km	MPC · JPL
468915	2014 UC_{51}	—	October 27, 2005	Mount Lemmon	Mount Lemmon Survey	·	2.5 km	MPC · JPL
468916	2014 VC_{1}	—	January 6, 2005	Socorro	LINEAR	H	740 m	MPC · JPL
468917	2014 VS_{1}	—	August 23, 2001	Kitt Peak	Spacewatch	·	1.6 km	MPC · JPL
468918	2014 VK_{21}	—	December 20, 2001	Kitt Peak	Spacewatch	·	3.0 km	MPC · JPL
468919	2014 WH	—	September 16, 2006	Catalina	CSS	H	410 m	MPC · JPL
468920	2014 WY_{5}	—	November 22, 2006	Kitt Peak	Spacewatch	H	480 m	MPC · JPL
468921	2014 WF_{123}	—	November 21, 2003	Kitt Peak	Spacewatch	·	3.2 km	MPC · JPL
468922	2014 WE_{186}	—	January 22, 2004	Socorro	LINEAR	THB	3.1 km	MPC · JPL
468923	2014 WK_{363}	—	February 2, 2005	Socorro	LINEAR	H	570 m	MPC · JPL
468924	2014 WT_{389}	—	March 28, 2011	Mount Lemmon	Mount Lemmon Survey	GEF	1.2 km	MPC · JPL
468925	2014 WD_{427}	—	December 25, 2000	Kitt Peak	Spacewatch	·	2.5 km	MPC · JPL
468926	2014 WQ_{428}	—	March 19, 2010	WISE	WISE	CYB	3.9 km	MPC · JPL
468927	2014 WZ_{467}	—	December 23, 2001	Kitt Peak	Spacewatch	CYB	4.7 km	MPC · JPL
468928	2014 WA_{481}	—	October 19, 2006	Kitt Peak	Deep Ecliptic Survey	·	4.1 km	MPC · JPL
468929	2014 YG_{5}	—	March 18, 2010	Catalina	CSS	T_{j} (2.94)	5.0 km	MPC · JPL
468930	2014 YB_{24}	—	September 20, 2008	Mount Lemmon	Mount Lemmon Survey	·	2.6 km	MPC · JPL
468931	2014 YM_{38}	—	March 25, 2007	Mount Lemmon	Mount Lemmon Survey	·	1.5 km	MPC · JPL
468932	2015 AG_{1}	—	December 11, 2010	Mount Lemmon	Mount Lemmon Survey	EUN	1.2 km	MPC · JPL
468933	2015 AO_{2}	—	April 13, 2010	Catalina	CSS	·	3.9 km	MPC · JPL
468934	2015 AH_{3}	—	January 16, 2005	Kitt Peak	Spacewatch	·	2.1 km	MPC · JPL
468935	2015 AR_{3}	—	May 19, 2010	WISE	WISE	·	2.6 km	MPC · JPL
468936	2015 AW_{7}	—	October 11, 2005	Kitt Peak	Spacewatch	·	1.5 km	MPC · JPL
468937	2015 AE_{9}	—	March 3, 2005	Kitt Peak	Spacewatch	·	4.0 km	MPC · JPL
468938	2015 AJ_{9}	—	September 9, 2007	Kitt Peak	Spacewatch	·	3.8 km	MPC · JPL
468939	2015 AO_{10}	—	September 20, 2001	Socorro	LINEAR	·	3.2 km	MPC · JPL
468940	2015 AF_{12}	—	September 4, 2013	Mount Lemmon	Mount Lemmon Survey	·	2.7 km	MPC · JPL
468941	2015 AD_{13}	—	May 8, 2010	WISE	WISE	·	2.7 km	MPC · JPL
468942	2015 AL_{15}	—	March 15, 2007	Kitt Peak	Spacewatch	MAR	1.2 km	MPC · JPL
468943	2015 AR_{15}	—	June 14, 2010	WISE	WISE	·	3.3 km	MPC · JPL
468944	2015 AS_{15}	—	November 28, 2005	Kitt Peak	Spacewatch	·	2.3 km	MPC · JPL
468945	2015 AK_{16}	—	January 12, 2010	WISE	WISE	·	3.6 km	MPC · JPL
468946	2015 AD_{18}	—	October 11, 1996	Kitt Peak	Spacewatch	·	910 m	MPC · JPL
468947	2015 AE_{18}	—	September 28, 2009	Mount Lemmon	Mount Lemmon Survey	WIT	1.1 km	MPC · JPL
468948	2015 AW_{19}	—	October 11, 2007	Catalina	CSS	·	780 m	MPC · JPL
468949	2015 AL_{20}	—	November 8, 2007	Mount Lemmon	Mount Lemmon Survey	PHO	1.1 km	MPC · JPL
468950	2015 AU_{25}	—	March 13, 2007	Kitt Peak	Spacewatch	·	1.4 km	MPC · JPL
468951	2015 AJ_{26}	—	June 22, 2010	WISE	WISE	·	3.0 km	MPC · JPL
468952	2015 AT_{27}	—	December 19, 2004	Mount Lemmon	Mount Lemmon Survey	·	2.0 km	MPC · JPL
468953	2015 AM_{28}	—	January 22, 1998	Kitt Peak	Spacewatch	·	1.1 km	MPC · JPL
468954	2015 AM_{30}	—	February 18, 2010	Mount Lemmon	Mount Lemmon Survey	THM	2.3 km	MPC · JPL
468955	2015 AC_{34}	—	January 25, 2006	Kitt Peak	Spacewatch	HOF	2.8 km	MPC · JPL
468956	2015 AV_{34}	—	December 18, 2009	Kitt Peak	Spacewatch	·	2.5 km	MPC · JPL
468957	2015 AY_{34}	—	January 5, 2006	Mount Lemmon	Mount Lemmon Survey	GEF	1.2 km	MPC · JPL
468958	2015 AH_{38}	—	February 7, 2000	Kitt Peak	Spacewatch	·	1.4 km	MPC · JPL
468959	2015 AO_{39}	—	September 3, 2008	Kitt Peak	Spacewatch	·	2.0 km	MPC · JPL
468960	2015 AZ_{41}	—	May 14, 2009	Kitt Peak	Spacewatch	·	750 m	MPC · JPL
468961	2015 AR_{42}	—	September 22, 2008	Kitt Peak	Spacewatch	·	2.1 km	MPC · JPL
468962	2015 AY_{42}	—	December 22, 2003	Kitt Peak	Spacewatch	·	3.2 km	MPC · JPL
468963	2015 AN_{43}	—	February 2, 2005	Kitt Peak	Spacewatch	·	1.7 km	MPC · JPL
468964	2015 AO_{46}	—	December 18, 2001	Socorro	LINEAR	·	1.5 km	MPC · JPL
468965	2015 AS_{46}	—	February 14, 2010	Catalina	CSS	·	2.8 km	MPC · JPL
468966	2015 AO_{47}	—	May 24, 2010	WISE	WISE	PHO	2.2 km	MPC · JPL
468967	2015 AC_{49}	—	February 1, 2012	Kitt Peak	Spacewatch	PHO	960 m	MPC · JPL
468968	2015 AH_{52}	—	November 19, 2003	Catalina	CSS	·	1.4 km	MPC · JPL
468969	2015 AV_{54}	—	November 3, 2007	Mount Lemmon	Mount Lemmon Survey	·	760 m	MPC · JPL
468970	2015 AM_{67}	—	October 2, 2013	Mount Lemmon	Mount Lemmon Survey	·	2.1 km	MPC · JPL
468971	2015 AK_{77}	—	May 24, 2010	WISE	WISE	·	2.2 km	MPC · JPL
468972	2015 AQ_{83}	—	October 28, 2006	Mount Lemmon	Mount Lemmon Survey	MAS	710 m	MPC · JPL
468973	2015 AQ_{87}	—	September 9, 2008	Mount Lemmon	Mount Lemmon Survey	·	2.4 km	MPC · JPL
468974	2015 AH_{92}	—	October 9, 2008	Catalina	CSS	·	2.1 km	MPC · JPL
468975	2015 AZ_{94}	—	January 12, 2010	Mount Lemmon	Mount Lemmon Survey	·	2.1 km	MPC · JPL
468976	2015 AJ_{99}	—	December 31, 2007	Mount Lemmon	Mount Lemmon Survey	·	1.1 km	MPC · JPL
468977	2015 AP_{101}	—	January 9, 2002	Socorro	LINEAR	·	1.7 km	MPC · JPL
468978	2015 AC_{110}	—	February 13, 2004	Kitt Peak	Spacewatch	VER	2.6 km	MPC · JPL
468979	2015 AV_{111}	—	May 6, 2011	Kitt Peak	Spacewatch	EOS	2.0 km	MPC · JPL
468980	2015 AZ_{124}	—	February 25, 2006	Kitt Peak	Spacewatch	·	1.6 km	MPC · JPL
468981	2015 AU_{125}	—	April 4, 2008	Catalina	CSS	·	1.8 km	MPC · JPL
468982	2015 AN_{128}	—	April 10, 2005	Mount Lemmon	Mount Lemmon Survey	·	500 m	MPC · JPL
468983	2015 AR_{133}	—	June 21, 2007	Kitt Peak	Spacewatch	·	2.9 km	MPC · JPL
468984	2015 AG_{137}	—	December 6, 2005	Kitt Peak	Spacewatch	·	1.3 km	MPC · JPL
468985	2015 AU_{137}	—	February 27, 2006	Kitt Peak	Spacewatch	KOR	1.3 km	MPC · JPL
468986	2015 AM_{151}	—	November 17, 2008	Kitt Peak	Spacewatch	·	1.7 km	MPC · JPL
468987	2015 AP_{152}	—	October 15, 2007	Kitt Peak	Spacewatch	HYG	2.9 km	MPC · JPL
468988	2015 AC_{155}	—	January 7, 2005	Kitt Peak	Spacewatch	KOR	1.5 km	MPC · JPL
468989	2015 AL_{156}	—	December 14, 2010	Mount Lemmon	Mount Lemmon Survey	·	1.3 km	MPC · JPL
468990	2015 AO_{159}	—	January 28, 2006	Kitt Peak	Spacewatch	·	2.4 km	MPC · JPL
468991	2015 AQ_{162}	—	March 16, 2007	Mount Lemmon	Mount Lemmon Survey	·	960 m	MPC · JPL
468992	2015 AT_{165}	—	June 13, 2005	Kitt Peak	Spacewatch	·	1.2 km	MPC · JPL
468993	2015 AS_{167}	—	October 26, 2008	Kitt Peak	Spacewatch	EOS	1.7 km	MPC · JPL
468994	2015 AM_{169}	—	March 9, 2011	Kitt Peak	Spacewatch	·	2.2 km	MPC · JPL
468995	2015 AX_{172}	—	September 24, 2008	Mount Lemmon	Mount Lemmon Survey	KOR	1.1 km	MPC · JPL
468996	2015 AX_{174}	—	December 17, 2003	Kitt Peak	Spacewatch	EOS	2.5 km	MPC · JPL
468997	2015 AO_{177}	—	February 21, 2006	Mount Lemmon	Mount Lemmon Survey	MRX	1.1 km	MPC · JPL
468998	2015 AZ_{177}	—	November 24, 2006	Mount Lemmon	Mount Lemmon Survey	·	1.7 km	MPC · JPL
468999	2015 AL_{179}	—	December 31, 2007	Mount Lemmon	Mount Lemmon Survey	V	510 m	MPC · JPL
469000	2015 AD_{181}	—	October 29, 1999	Kitt Peak	Spacewatch	·	1.8 km	MPC · JPL

back to top

== Meaning of names ==
As minor planet discoveries are confirmed, they are given a permanent number by the IAU's Minor Planet Center (MPC), and the discoverers can then submit names for them, following the IAU's naming conventions. The list below concerns those minor planets in the specified number-range that have received names, and explains the meanings of those names.

Official naming citations of newly named small Solar System bodies are approved and published in a bulletin by IAU's Working Group for Small Bodies Nomenclature (WGSBN). Before May 2021, citations were published in MPC's Minor Planet Circulars for many decades. Recent citations can also be found on the JPL Small-Body Database (SBDB). Until his death in 2016, German astronomer Lutz D. Schmadel compiled these citations into the Dictionary of Minor Planet Names (DMP) and regularly updated the collection.

Based on Paul Herget's The Names of the Minor Planets, Schmadel also researched the unclear origin of numerous asteroids, most of which had been named prior to World War II. This article incorporates text from this source, which is in the public domain: SBDB New namings may only be added to this list below after official publication as the preannouncement of names is condemned. The WGSBN publishes a comprehensive guideline for the naming rules of non-cometary small Solar System bodies.

Named minor planet	Provisional	This minor planet was named for...	Ref · Catalog
468044 Lacatus	2013 QU_{74}	Daniela Lacatus, Romanian solar physicist who works at the National Center for Atmospheric Research's High Altitude Observatory, USA.	IAU · 468044
468581 Maiajasperwhite	2007 JW_{33}	Maia Jasper White (b. 1982), a chamber musician, teacher, and musical entrepreneur in Los Angeles, California.	IAU · 468581
468725 Khalat	2010 JG_{3}	Isaak Markovich Khalatnikov (nicknamed Khalat; born 1919) is an Academician of the Russian Academy of Sciences, and a theoretical physicist with an extremely wide range of scientific interests. He made important contributions to the theories of viscosity of superfluid helium, quantum electrodynamics and cosmology.	JPL · 468725
