= List of minor planets: 529001–530000 =

The following is a partial list of minor planets, running from minor-planet number 529001 through 530000, inclusive. The primary data for this and other partial lists is based on JPL's "Small-Body Orbital Elements" and data available from the Minor Planet Center. Critical list information is also provided by the MPC, unless otherwise specified from Lowell Observatory. A detailed description of the table's columns and additional sources are given on the main page including a complete list of every page in this series, and a statistical break-up on the dynamical classification of minor planets.

Also see the summary list of all named bodies in numerical and alphabetical order, and the corresponding naming citations for the number range of this particular list. New namings may only be added to this list after official publication, as the preannouncement of names is condemned by the Working Group for Small Bodies Nomenclature of the International Astronomical Union.

Near-Earth obj.	MBA (inner)	MBA (outer)	Centaur
Mars-crosser	MBA (middle)	Jupiter trojan	Trans-Neptunian obj.
Unclassified

== 529001–529100 ==
Designation			Discovery			Properties		Ref
Permanent	Provisional	Named after	Date	Site	Discoverer(s)	Category	Diam.	Ref
529001	2009 HP_{110}	—	April 18, 2009	Kitt Peak	Spacewatch	·	1.3 km	MPC · JPL
529002	2009 HQ_{110}	—	April 21, 2009	Mount Lemmon	Mount Lemmon Survey	V	820 m	MPC · JPL
529003	2009 HS_{110}	—	April 30, 2009	Kitt Peak	Spacewatch	·	850 m	MPC · JPL
529004	2009 HU_{110}	—	April 19, 2009	Kitt Peak	Spacewatch	·	1.1 km	MPC · JPL
529005	2009 JE	—	September 12, 2007	Catalina	CSS	H	530 m	MPC · JPL
529006	2009 JV	—	May 1, 2009	Kitt Peak	Spacewatch	·	950 m	MPC · JPL
529007	2009 JQ_{4}	—	April 24, 2009	Catalina	CSS	·	2.2 km	MPC · JPL
529008	2009 JG_{7}	—	April 21, 2009	Kitt Peak	Spacewatch	·	490 m	MPC · JPL
529009	2009 JV_{11}	—	May 15, 2009	Kitt Peak	Spacewatch	·	1.5 km	MPC · JPL
529010	2009 JM_{12}	—	April 2, 2009	Kitt Peak	Spacewatch	·	1.8 km	MPC · JPL
529011	2009 JW_{12}	—	March 18, 2009	Kitt Peak	Spacewatch	H	480 m	MPC · JPL
529012	2009 JX_{15}	—	April 18, 2009	Kitt Peak	Spacewatch	·	660 m	MPC · JPL
529013	2009 JP_{19}	—	May 13, 2009	Kitt Peak	Spacewatch	·	710 m	MPC · JPL
529014	2009 JQ_{19}	—	May 15, 2009	Kitt Peak	Spacewatch	·	2.6 km	MPC · JPL
529015	2009 KA_{9}	—	May 3, 2009	Kitt Peak	Spacewatch	·	490 m	MPC · JPL
529016	2009 KL_{10}	—	April 20, 2009	Mount Lemmon	Mount Lemmon Survey	·	1.8 km	MPC · JPL
529017	2009 KY_{11}	—	April 18, 2009	Mount Lemmon	Mount Lemmon Survey	·	540 m	MPC · JPL
529018	2009 KH_{12}	—	April 18, 2009	Mount Lemmon	Mount Lemmon Survey	·	1.4 km	MPC · JPL
529019	2009 KM_{12}	—	April 18, 2009	Kitt Peak	Spacewatch	·	2.7 km	MPC · JPL
529020	2009 KA_{14}	—	April 27, 2009	Kitt Peak	Spacewatch	·	570 m	MPC · JPL
529021	2009 KX_{17}	—	April 29, 2009	Kitt Peak	Spacewatch	·	1.7 km	MPC · JPL
529022	2009 KP_{18}	—	May 27, 2009	Kitt Peak	Spacewatch	·	2.1 km	MPC · JPL
529023	2009 KJ_{19}	—	May 28, 2009	Mount Lemmon	Mount Lemmon Survey	·	2.4 km	MPC · JPL
529024	2009 KU_{19}	—	April 25, 2003	Kitt Peak	Spacewatch	·	3.2 km	MPC · JPL
529025	2009 KE_{23}	—	April 24, 2009	Kitt Peak	Spacewatch	·	580 m	MPC · JPL
529026	2009 KM_{26}	—	May 26, 2009	Catalina	CSS	·	2.3 km	MPC · JPL
529027	2009 KQ_{38}	—	May 28, 2009	Kitt Peak	Spacewatch	·	990 m	MPC · JPL
529028	2009 LT_{3}	—	June 12, 2009	Kitt Peak	Spacewatch	·	770 m	MPC · JPL
529029	2009 LJ_{7}	—	June 1, 2009	Mount Lemmon	Mount Lemmon Survey	H	570 m	MPC · JPL
529030	2009 ME_{8}	—	June 27, 2009	La Sagra	OAM	·	810 m	MPC · JPL
529031	2009 MP_{10}	—	August 27, 2005	Kitt Peak	Spacewatch	·	1.1 km	MPC · JPL
529032	2009 NA	—	July 1, 2009	La Sagra	OAM	AMO +1km	1.1 km	MPC · JPL
529033	2009 NQ	—	July 13, 2009	La Sagra	OAM	·	1.2 km	MPC · JPL
529034	2009 OA	—	July 16, 2009	La Sagra	OAM	·	1.9 km	MPC · JPL
529035	2009 OF_{1}	—	July 18, 2009	Sandlot	G. Hug	(1547)	1.3 km	MPC · JPL
529036	2009 OO_{5}	—	July 25, 2009	La Sagra	OAM	·	2.0 km	MPC · JPL
529037	2009 OB_{9}	—	July 28, 2009	La Sagra	OAM	·	1.2 km	MPC · JPL
529038	2009 OL_{11}	—	January 28, 2007	Mount Lemmon	Mount Lemmon Survey	·	1.6 km	MPC · JPL
529039	2009 OR_{13}	—	July 27, 2009	Kitt Peak	Spacewatch	(5)	1.1 km	MPC · JPL
529040	2009 OT_{17}	—	July 28, 2009	Kitt Peak	Spacewatch	·	1.1 km	MPC · JPL
529041	2009 OT_{22}	—	July 29, 2009	La Sagra	OAM	·	1.7 km	MPC · JPL
529042	2009 OY_{22}	—	July 19, 2009	Siding Spring	SSS	·	1.3 km	MPC · JPL
529043	2009 OL_{25}	—	January 27, 2007	Mount Lemmon	Mount Lemmon Survey	·	2.3 km	MPC · JPL
529044	2009 OZ_{25}	—	July 27, 2009	Catalina	CSS	·	1.0 km	MPC · JPL
529045	2009 OB_{26}	—	July 29, 2009	Kitt Peak	Spacewatch	·	1.3 km	MPC · JPL
529046	2009 OC_{26}	—	July 30, 2009	Kitt Peak	Spacewatch	·	1.7 km	MPC · JPL
529047	2009 PV	—	August 10, 2009	Kitt Peak	Spacewatch	·	1.1 km	MPC · JPL
529048	2009 PS_{1}	—	August 14, 2009	Sandlot	G. Hug	·	1.5 km	MPC · JPL
529049	2009 PJ_{2}	—	July 29, 2009	Kitt Peak	Spacewatch	·	1.2 km	MPC · JPL
529050	2009 PY_{2}	—	August 14, 2009	Siding Spring	SSS	·	1.7 km	MPC · JPL
529051	2009 PK_{3}	—	July 28, 2009	Catalina	CSS	THB	3.4 km	MPC · JPL
529052	2009 PA_{5}	—	August 15, 2009	Catalina	CSS	·	1.7 km	MPC · JPL
529053	2009 PC_{6}	—	August 10, 2009	Kitt Peak	Spacewatch	·	1.2 km	MPC · JPL
529054	2009 PQ_{6}	—	June 23, 2009	Mount Lemmon	Mount Lemmon Survey	·	3.0 km	MPC · JPL
529055	2009 PN_{10}	—	July 28, 2009	Kitt Peak	Spacewatch	·	2.0 km	MPC · JPL
529056	2009 PO_{11}	—	August 15, 2009	Catalina	CSS	ADE	2.2 km	MPC · JPL
529057	2009 PK_{13}	—	August 15, 2009	Catalina	CSS	·	1.6 km	MPC · JPL
529058	2009 PZ_{20}	—	August 15, 2009	Kitt Peak	Spacewatch	·	1.0 km	MPC · JPL
529059	2009 PU_{21}	—	October 22, 2005	Kitt Peak	Spacewatch	·	1.4 km	MPC · JPL
529060	2009 QB_{5}	—	August 16, 2009	La Sagra	OAM	·	630 m	MPC · JPL
529061	2009 QJ_{8}	—	August 16, 2009	Catalina	CSS	·	1.5 km	MPC · JPL
529062	2009 QD_{11}	—	August 19, 2009	Kitt Peak	Spacewatch	·	1.7 km	MPC · JPL
529063	2009 QM_{14}	—	August 16, 2009	Kitt Peak	Spacewatch	·	940 m	MPC · JPL
529064	2009 QK_{16}	—	August 16, 2009	Kitt Peak	Spacewatch	V	470 m	MPC · JPL
529065	2009 QC_{19}	—	August 17, 2009	Siding Spring	SSS	·	1.7 km	MPC · JPL
529066	2009 QN_{22}	—	August 20, 2009	La Sagra	OAM	·	1.6 km	MPC · JPL
529067	2009 QD_{23}	—	August 18, 2009	Catalina	CSS	·	1.5 km	MPC · JPL
529068	2009 QG_{23}	—	August 16, 2009	La Sagra	OAM	EUN	1.2 km	MPC · JPL
529069	2009 QF_{24}	—	August 16, 2009	Kitt Peak	Spacewatch	NYS	1.0 km	MPC · JPL
529070	2009 QA_{27}	—	August 23, 2009	Dauban	Kugel, F.	·	2.0 km	MPC · JPL
529071	2009 QQ_{28}	—	August 19, 2009	La Sagra	OAM	·	2.0 km	MPC · JPL
529072	2009 QU_{28}	—	August 18, 2009	Catalina	CSS	·	1.3 km	MPC · JPL
529073	2009 QM_{30}	—	August 21, 2009	Socorro	LINEAR	·	2.1 km	MPC · JPL
529074	2009 QH_{32}	—	August 20, 2009	Kitt Peak	Spacewatch	·	730 m	MPC · JPL
529075	2009 QL_{33}	—	August 24, 2009	La Sagra	OAM	EUN	1.3 km	MPC · JPL
529076	2009 QJ_{38}	—	August 28, 2009	Catalina	CSS	·	1.7 km	MPC · JPL
529077	2009 QH_{39}	—	August 20, 2009	Kitt Peak	Spacewatch	·	1.2 km	MPC · JPL
529078	2009 QS_{39}	—	August 20, 2009	Kitt Peak	Spacewatch	·	750 m	MPC · JPL
529079	2009 QF_{40}	—	August 25, 2009	La Sagra	OAM	·	1.8 km	MPC · JPL
529080	2009 QD_{43}	—	August 15, 2009	Kitt Peak	Spacewatch	JUN	1.2 km	MPC · JPL
529081	2009 QX_{45}	—	August 27, 2009	Bergisch Gladbach	W. Bickel	HNS	1.4 km	MPC · JPL
529082	2009 QX_{47}	—	August 28, 2009	La Sagra	OAM	·	1.8 km	MPC · JPL
529083	2009 QA_{52}	—	August 18, 2009	Catalina	CSS	·	1.7 km	MPC · JPL
529084	2009 QT_{52}	—	August 20, 2009	Kitt Peak	Spacewatch	JUN	890 m	MPC · JPL
529085	2009 QT_{53}	—	August 17, 2009	Kitt Peak	Spacewatch	(5)	950 m	MPC · JPL
529086	2009 QZ_{53}	—	August 19, 2009	Kitt Peak	Spacewatch	DOR	2.3 km	MPC · JPL
529087	2009 QR_{54}	—	August 27, 2009	Kitt Peak	Spacewatch	HNS	840 m	MPC · JPL
529088	2009 QS_{59}	—	August 21, 2009	Socorro	LINEAR	·	1.4 km	MPC · JPL
529089	2009 QY_{62}	—	August 28, 2009	La Sagra	OAM	T_{j} (2.98)	3.4 km	MPC · JPL
529090	2009 QD_{64}	—	August 18, 2009	Kitt Peak	Spacewatch	·	1.8 km	MPC · JPL
529091	2009 RJ_{4}	—	August 15, 2009	Kitt Peak	Spacewatch	·	1.2 km	MPC · JPL
529092	2009 RR_{7}	—	August 28, 2009	Catalina	CSS	·	2.2 km	MPC · JPL
529093	2009 RV_{12}	—	September 12, 2009	Kitt Peak	Spacewatch	H	440 m	MPC · JPL
529094	2009 RO_{13}	—	September 12, 2009	Kitt Peak	Spacewatch	·	1.0 km	MPC · JPL
529095	2009 RS_{18}	—	August 28, 2009	Catalina	CSS	·	1.2 km	MPC · JPL
529096	2009 RR_{20}	—	September 14, 2009	Kitt Peak	Spacewatch	HNS	1 km	MPC · JPL
529097	2009 RQ_{21}	—	July 28, 2009	Kitt Peak	Spacewatch	·	3.0 km	MPC · JPL
529098	2009 RJ_{23}	—	August 29, 2009	La Sagra	OAM	·	2.2 km	MPC · JPL
529099	2009 RG_{26}	—	September 13, 2009	Socorro	LINEAR	·	1.7 km	MPC · JPL
529100	2009 RQ_{29}	—	September 14, 2009	Kitt Peak	Spacewatch	(5)	800 m	MPC · JPL

== 529101–529200 ==
back to top

Designation			Discovery			Properties		Ref
Permanent	Provisional	Named after	Date	Site	Discoverer(s)	Category	Diam.	Ref
529101	2009 RA_{32}	—	September 14, 2009	Kitt Peak	Spacewatch	·	1.3 km	MPC · JPL
529102	2009 RD_{39}	—	September 15, 2009	Kitt Peak	Spacewatch	V	550 m	MPC · JPL
529103	2009 RM_{39}	—	August 18, 2009	Catalina	CSS	·	1.1 km	MPC · JPL
529104	2009 RQ_{42}	—	September 15, 2009	Kitt Peak	Spacewatch	·	1.4 km	MPC · JPL
529105	2009 RZ_{42}	—	September 15, 2009	Kitt Peak	Spacewatch	·	1.4 km	MPC · JPL
529106	2009 RE_{44}	—	September 15, 2009	Kitt Peak	Spacewatch	·	1.0 km	MPC · JPL
529107	2009 RX_{44}	—	September 15, 2009	Kitt Peak	Spacewatch	·	1.3 km	MPC · JPL
529108	2009 RT_{45}	—	September 15, 2009	Kitt Peak	Spacewatch	·	2.0 km	MPC · JPL
529109	2009 RL_{46}	—	September 15, 2009	Kitt Peak	Spacewatch	·	1.1 km	MPC · JPL
529110	2009 RO_{47}	—	September 14, 2009	Socorro	LINEAR	·	1.9 km	MPC · JPL
529111	2009 RP_{48}	—	September 15, 2009	Kitt Peak	Spacewatch	·	960 m	MPC · JPL
529112	2009 RM_{51}	—	September 15, 2009	Kitt Peak	Spacewatch	·	1.6 km	MPC · JPL
529113	2009 RX_{52}	—	September 15, 2009	Kitt Peak	Spacewatch	·	1.5 km	MPC · JPL
529114	2009 RH_{58}	—	September 15, 2009	Kitt Peak	Spacewatch	·	2.0 km	MPC · JPL
529115	2009 RX_{60}	—	August 16, 2009	Catalina	CSS	·	1.5 km	MPC · JPL
529116	2009 RC_{72}	—	September 15, 2009	Kitt Peak	Spacewatch	·	2.1 km	MPC · JPL
529117	2009 RF_{73}	—	September 15, 2009	Catalina	CSS	·	1.7 km	MPC · JPL
529118	2009 RT_{74}	—	September 14, 2009	Socorro	LINEAR	H	450 m	MPC · JPL
529119	2009 RE_{75}	—	November 1, 2005	Mount Lemmon	Mount Lemmon Survey	·	2.3 km	MPC · JPL
529120	2009 RN_{75}	—	September 14, 2009	Socorro	LINEAR	·	1.3 km	MPC · JPL
529121	2009 SV_{1}	—	August 19, 2009	Kitt Peak	Spacewatch	·	1.4 km	MPC · JPL
529122	2009 SU_{4}	—	August 17, 2009	Catalina	CSS	·	1.4 km	MPC · JPL
529123	2009 SJ_{11}	—	December 21, 2006	Kitt Peak	Spacewatch	(5)	1.1 km	MPC · JPL
529124	2009 SC_{12}	—	August 18, 2009	Kitt Peak	Spacewatch	·	1.8 km	MPC · JPL
529125	2009 SC_{16}	—	August 15, 2009	Kitt Peak	Spacewatch	·	2.6 km	MPC · JPL
529126	2009 SP_{18}	—	September 19, 2009	Mount Lemmon	Mount Lemmon Survey	·	1.9 km	MPC · JPL
529127	2009 SJ_{21}	—	September 18, 2009	Catalina	CSS	·	2.2 km	MPC · JPL
529128	2009 SN_{22}	—	July 30, 2009	Kitt Peak	Spacewatch	·	1.6 km	MPC · JPL
529129	2009 SS_{26}	—	September 16, 2009	Kitt Peak	Spacewatch	·	1.6 km	MPC · JPL
529130	2009 SU_{26}	—	September 16, 2009	Kitt Peak	Spacewatch	MAR	900 m	MPC · JPL
529131	2009 SD_{33}	—	September 16, 2009	Kitt Peak	Spacewatch	·	1.3 km	MPC · JPL
529132	2009 SP_{34}	—	September 16, 2009	Kitt Peak	Spacewatch	MRX	690 m	MPC · JPL
529133	2009 SV_{34}	—	September 16, 2009	Kitt Peak	Spacewatch	·	1.4 km	MPC · JPL
529134	2009 SP_{37}	—	September 16, 2009	Kitt Peak	Spacewatch	·	1.5 km	MPC · JPL
529135	2009 SZ_{37}	—	September 16, 2009	Kitt Peak	Spacewatch	JUN	880 m	MPC · JPL
529136	2009 SR_{40}	—	September 16, 2009	Kitt Peak	Spacewatch	H	500 m	MPC · JPL
529137	2009 SE_{43}	—	September 16, 2009	Kitt Peak	Spacewatch	·	1.3 km	MPC · JPL
529138	2009 SN_{48}	—	September 16, 2009	Kitt Peak	Spacewatch	·	880 m	MPC · JPL
529139	2009 SH_{50}	—	September 17, 2009	Kitt Peak	Spacewatch	·	1.4 km	MPC · JPL
529140	2009 SN_{52}	—	September 17, 2009	Kitt Peak	Spacewatch	·	1.4 km	MPC · JPL
529141	2009 SE_{53}	—	September 17, 2009	Catalina	CSS	·	1.1 km	MPC · JPL
529142	2009 SA_{57}	—	September 17, 2009	Kitt Peak	Spacewatch	·	1.5 km	MPC · JPL
529143	2009 SD_{57}	—	September 17, 2009	Kitt Peak	Spacewatch	·	1.6 km	MPC · JPL
529144	2009 SA_{59}	—	September 17, 2009	Kitt Peak	Spacewatch	·	1.1 km	MPC · JPL
529145	2009 SG_{67}	—	September 17, 2009	Kitt Peak	Spacewatch	·	1.7 km	MPC · JPL
529146	2009 SP_{71}	—	September 17, 2009	Mount Lemmon	Mount Lemmon Survey	·	1.4 km	MPC · JPL
529147	2009 ST_{71}	—	August 27, 2009	Kitt Peak	Spacewatch	·	1.2 km	MPC · JPL
529148	2009 SD_{72}	—	September 17, 2009	Mount Lemmon	Mount Lemmon Survey	·	770 m	MPC · JPL
529149	2009 SF_{75}	—	September 17, 2009	Kitt Peak	Spacewatch	·	1.4 km	MPC · JPL
529150	2009 SY_{75}	—	September 17, 2009	Kitt Peak	Spacewatch	WIT	1.1 km	MPC · JPL
529151	2009 SJ_{81}	—	September 18, 2009	Mount Lemmon	Mount Lemmon Survey	BRG	1.1 km	MPC · JPL
529152	2009 SG_{98}	—	September 11, 2009	Catalina	CSS	JUN	970 m	MPC · JPL
529153	2009 SY_{99}	—	September 22, 2009	La Sagra	OAM	·	1.9 km	MPC · JPL
529154	2009 SC_{103}	—	September 25, 2009	La Sagra	OAM	·	1.5 km	MPC · JPL
529155	2009 SE_{105}	—	September 16, 2009	Kitt Peak	Spacewatch	·	1.8 km	MPC · JPL
529156	2009 SX_{112}	—	October 27, 2005	Kitt Peak	Spacewatch	·	1.4 km	MPC · JPL
529157	2009 SJ_{114}	—	September 18, 2009	Kitt Peak	Spacewatch	·	1.6 km	MPC · JPL
529158	2009 SB_{115}	—	September 18, 2009	Kitt Peak	Spacewatch	·	1.7 km	MPC · JPL
529159	2009 SO_{118}	—	September 18, 2009	Kitt Peak	Spacewatch	·	880 m	MPC · JPL
529160	2009 SV_{118}	—	July 28, 2009	Kitt Peak	Spacewatch	JUN	760 m	MPC · JPL
529161	2009 SW_{121}	—	April 29, 2003	Kitt Peak	Spacewatch	·	2.0 km	MPC · JPL
529162	2009 SD_{122}	—	September 18, 2009	Kitt Peak	Spacewatch	·	980 m	MPC · JPL
529163	2009 SW_{122}	—	September 18, 2009	Catalina	CSS	·	2.2 km	MPC · JPL
529164	2009 SA_{126}	—	September 18, 2009	Kitt Peak	Spacewatch	·	1.2 km	MPC · JPL
529165	2009 SJ_{127}	—	September 18, 2009	Kitt Peak	Spacewatch	·	1.4 km	MPC · JPL
529166	2009 SF_{129}	—	September 18, 2009	Kitt Peak	Spacewatch	·	1.2 km	MPC · JPL
529167	2009 SK_{129}	—	September 18, 2009	Kitt Peak	Spacewatch	·	860 m	MPC · JPL
529168	2009 SZ_{129}	—	September 18, 2009	Kitt Peak	Spacewatch	AEO	960 m	MPC · JPL
529169	2009 SW_{134}	—	September 18, 2009	Kitt Peak	Spacewatch	EUN	960 m	MPC · JPL
529170	2009 SA_{137}	—	September 18, 2009	Kitt Peak	Spacewatch	·	1.3 km	MPC · JPL
529171	2009 SW_{139}	—	September 19, 2009	Kitt Peak	Spacewatch	·	890 m	MPC · JPL
529172	2009 SM_{148}	—	September 15, 2009	Kitt Peak	Spacewatch	·	690 m	MPC · JPL
529173	2009 SE_{150}	—	August 27, 2009	La Sagra	OAM	THB	3.4 km	MPC · JPL
529174	2009 SF_{150}	—	September 20, 2009	Kitt Peak	Spacewatch	·	1.6 km	MPC · JPL
529175	2009 SN_{151}	—	September 20, 2009	Kitt Peak	Spacewatch	·	970 m	MPC · JPL
529176	2009 SM_{158}	—	September 20, 2009	Kitt Peak	Spacewatch	MRX	650 m	MPC · JPL
529177	2009 SK_{160}	—	September 20, 2009	Kitt Peak	Spacewatch	·	1.2 km	MPC · JPL
529178	2009 SS_{161}	—	August 19, 2009	La Sagra	OAM	·	1.7 km	MPC · JPL
529179	2009 SM_{164}	—	September 21, 2009	Kitt Peak	Spacewatch	CLA	1.9 km	MPC · JPL
529180	2009 SQ_{166}	—	August 28, 2009	Catalina	CSS	·	1.9 km	MPC · JPL
529181	2009 SH_{171}	—	August 17, 2009	Kitt Peak	Spacewatch	·	1.3 km	MPC · JPL
529182	2009 SD_{188}	—	September 21, 2009	Kitt Peak	Spacewatch	·	1.4 km	MPC · JPL
529183	2009 SF_{188}	—	September 21, 2009	Kitt Peak	Spacewatch	·	1.5 km	MPC · JPL
529184	2009 SC_{192}	—	September 22, 2009	Kitt Peak	Spacewatch	·	820 m	MPC · JPL
529185	2009 SZ_{196}	—	September 19, 2009	Kitt Peak	Spacewatch	·	1.4 km	MPC · JPL
529186	2009 SN_{199}	—	September 22, 2009	Kitt Peak	Spacewatch	NEM	2.0 km	MPC · JPL
529187	2009 SA_{205}	—	September 18, 2009	Kitt Peak	Spacewatch	·	3.2 km	MPC · JPL
529188	2009 SF_{208}	—	September 15, 2009	Kitt Peak	Spacewatch	·	1.6 km	MPC · JPL
529189	2009 SA_{209}	—	September 15, 2009	Kitt Peak	Spacewatch	·	1.1 km	MPC · JPL
529190	2009 SB_{209}	—	September 23, 2009	Kitt Peak	Spacewatch	·	970 m	MPC · JPL
529191	2009 SM_{212}	—	December 27, 2005	Mount Lemmon	Mount Lemmon Survey	(12739)	1.3 km	MPC · JPL
529192	2009 SS_{215}	—	September 24, 2009	Kitt Peak	Spacewatch	·	2.5 km	MPC · JPL
529193	2009 SS_{224}	—	November 27, 2006	Mount Lemmon	Mount Lemmon Survey	·	1.2 km	MPC · JPL
529194	2009 SA_{235}	—	September 18, 2009	Catalina	CSS	(1547)	1.2 km	MPC · JPL
529195	2009 SE_{235}	—	September 18, 2009	Mount Lemmon	Mount Lemmon Survey	·	1.1 km	MPC · JPL
529196	2009 SK_{241}	—	September 18, 2009	Catalina	CSS	·	1.4 km	MPC · JPL
529197	2009 SS_{243}	—	September 18, 2009	Catalina	CSS	·	2.3 km	MPC · JPL
529198	2009 ST_{248}	—	January 6, 2006	Kitt Peak	Spacewatch	·	1.2 km	MPC · JPL
529199	2009 SX_{250}	—	September 20, 2009	Kitt Peak	Spacewatch	·	1.5 km	MPC · JPL
529200	2009 SG_{262}	—	December 2, 2005	Kitt Peak	Spacewatch	NEM	1.8 km	MPC · JPL

== 529201–529300 ==
back to top

Designation			Discovery			Properties		Ref
Permanent	Provisional	Named after	Date	Site	Discoverer(s)	Category	Diam.	Ref
529201	2009 SB_{267}	—	September 23, 2009	Mount Lemmon	Mount Lemmon Survey	·	1.6 km	MPC · JPL
529202	2009 SB_{269}	—	September 17, 2009	Kitt Peak	Spacewatch	·	970 m	MPC · JPL
529203	2009 SS_{269}	—	September 16, 2009	Kitt Peak	Spacewatch	·	1.6 km	MPC · JPL
529204	2009 SC_{276}	—	July 29, 2009	Kitt Peak	Spacewatch	EUN	950 m	MPC · JPL
529205	2009 SW_{279}	—	September 17, 2009	Kitt Peak	Spacewatch	EUN	910 m	MPC · JPL
529206	2009 SJ_{280}	—	September 17, 2009	Kitt Peak	Spacewatch	·	1.5 km	MPC · JPL
529207	2009 SA_{288}	—	September 25, 2009	Kitt Peak	Spacewatch	·	2.2 km	MPC · JPL
529208	2009 SF_{288}	—	September 25, 2009	Kitt Peak	Spacewatch	·	750 m	MPC · JPL
529209	2009 SO_{288}	—	September 25, 2009	Catalina	CSS	·	1.6 km	MPC · JPL
529210	2009 SP_{291}	—	September 25, 2009	Kitt Peak	Spacewatch	HNS	930 m	MPC · JPL
529211	2009 SX_{301}	—	August 29, 2009	Kitt Peak	Spacewatch	·	970 m	MPC · JPL
529212	2009 SO_{304}	—	September 17, 2009	Kitt Peak	Spacewatch	·	950 m	MPC · JPL
529213	2009 SU_{311}	—	August 20, 2009	Kitt Peak	Spacewatch	EUN	920 m	MPC · JPL
529214	2009 SC_{312}	—	August 18, 2009	Kitt Peak	Spacewatch	·	1.4 km	MPC · JPL
529215	2009 SW_{324}	—	September 25, 2009	Kitt Peak	Spacewatch	T_{j} (2.98) · EUP	3.1 km	MPC · JPL
529216	2009 SZ_{327}	—	September 18, 2009	Kitt Peak	Spacewatch	·	1.2 km	MPC · JPL
529217	2009 SS_{330}	—	August 17, 2009	Kitt Peak	Spacewatch	·	1.9 km	MPC · JPL
529218	2009 SE_{333}	—	September 24, 2009	Mount Lemmon	Mount Lemmon Survey	JUN	880 m	MPC · JPL
529219	2009 SU_{334}	—	September 26, 2009	Kitt Peak	Spacewatch	·	1.5 km	MPC · JPL
529220	2009 SL_{338}	—	September 20, 2009	Kitt Peak	Spacewatch	·	1.7 km	MPC · JPL
529221	2009 SE_{341}	—	September 25, 2009	Kitt Peak	Spacewatch	MIS	1.7 km	MPC · JPL
529222	2009 SL_{345}	—	September 19, 2009	Kitt Peak	Spacewatch	·	2.4 km	MPC · JPL
529223	2009 SM_{345}	—	September 19, 2009	Kitt Peak	Spacewatch	·	830 m	MPC · JPL
529224	2009 ST_{349}	—	September 17, 2009	Mount Lemmon	Mount Lemmon Survey	·	1.5 km	MPC · JPL
529225	2009 SP_{351}	—	September 26, 2009	Catalina	CSS	·	1.3 km	MPC · JPL
529226	2009 SU_{352}	—	September 25, 2009	Kitt Peak	Spacewatch	T_{j} (2.99)	4.2 km	MPC · JPL
529227	2009 SV_{352}	—	September 17, 2009	Kitt Peak	Spacewatch	fast	640 m	MPC · JPL
529228	2009 SR_{357}	—	September 26, 2009	Kitt Peak	Spacewatch	·	900 m	MPC · JPL
529229	2009 SY_{359}	—	September 26, 2009	Kitt Peak	Spacewatch	·	2.5 km	MPC · JPL
529230	2009 SD_{369}	—	September 30, 2009	Mount Lemmon	Mount Lemmon Survey	·	2.2 km	MPC · JPL
529231	2009 SJ_{370}	—	February 21, 2007	Kitt Peak	Spacewatch	·	1.2 km	MPC · JPL
529232	2009 SK_{370}	—	November 26, 2005	Mount Lemmon	Mount Lemmon Survey	·	1.2 km	MPC · JPL
529233	2009 SN_{370}	—	September 18, 2009	Kitt Peak	Spacewatch	·	1.7 km	MPC · JPL
529234	2009 SB_{371}	—	September 19, 2009	Mount Lemmon	Mount Lemmon Survey	AGN	1.1 km	MPC · JPL
529235	2009 SG_{371}	—	September 22, 2009	Kitt Peak	Spacewatch	·	1.2 km	MPC · JPL
529236	2009 SP_{371}	—	April 7, 2007	Mount Lemmon	Mount Lemmon Survey	·	2.0 km	MPC · JPL
529237	2009 SG_{372}	—	September 20, 2009	Kitt Peak	Spacewatch	·	870 m	MPC · JPL
529238	2009 SM_{372}	—	September 22, 2009	Kitt Peak	Spacewatch	·	2.0 km	MPC · JPL
529239	2009 SP_{372}	—	March 14, 2007	Mount Lemmon	Mount Lemmon Survey	·	1.7 km	MPC · JPL
529240	2009 TC_{6}	—	October 12, 2009	La Sagra	OAM	T_{j} (2.98) · EUP	4.1 km	MPC · JPL
529241	2009 TL_{7}	—	September 29, 2009	Mount Lemmon	Mount Lemmon Survey	·	1.5 km	MPC · JPL
529242	2009 TM_{9}	—	October 12, 2009	Mount Lemmon	Mount Lemmon Survey	H	430 m	MPC · JPL
529243	2009 TJ_{14}	—	September 20, 2009	Mount Lemmon	Mount Lemmon Survey	EUN	1.1 km	MPC · JPL
529244	2009 TX_{15}	—	October 1, 2009	Mount Lemmon	Mount Lemmon Survey	JUN	930 m	MPC · JPL
529245	2009 TQ_{18}	—	October 27, 2005	Kitt Peak	Spacewatch	·	810 m	MPC · JPL
529246	2009 TM_{20}	—	October 11, 2009	La Sagra	OAM	·	3.1 km	MPC · JPL
529247	2009 TC_{21}	—	October 11, 2009	La Sagra	OAM	·	2.2 km	MPC · JPL
529248	2009 TF_{22}	—	September 16, 2009	Kitt Peak	Spacewatch	·	1.7 km	MPC · JPL
529249	2009 TX_{23}	—	October 14, 2009	Mount Lemmon	Mount Lemmon Survey	·	910 m	MPC · JPL
529250	2009 TL_{26}	—	September 18, 2009	Kitt Peak	Spacewatch	·	2.0 km	MPC · JPL
529251	2009 TP_{26}	—	October 14, 2009	La Sagra	OAM	·	1.5 km	MPC · JPL
529252	2009 TW_{26}	—	August 15, 2009	Kitt Peak	Spacewatch	·	1.7 km	MPC · JPL
529253	2009 TQ_{30}	—	September 18, 2009	Kitt Peak	Spacewatch	·	1.4 km	MPC · JPL
529254	2009 TU_{35}	—	September 27, 2009	Kitt Peak	Spacewatch	·	1.7 km	MPC · JPL
529255	2009 TA_{45}	—	October 9, 2009	Catalina	CSS	·	1.3 km	MPC · JPL
529256	2009 TN_{47}	—	October 15, 2009	Socorro	LINEAR	·	2.7 km	MPC · JPL
529257	2009 TW_{49}	—	October 11, 2009	Mount Lemmon	Mount Lemmon Survey	CYB	3.0 km	MPC · JPL
529258	2009 US_{5}	—	October 16, 2009	Catalina	CSS	JUN	880 m	MPC · JPL
529259	2009 UG_{12}	—	September 27, 2009	Catalina	CSS	·	1.6 km	MPC · JPL
529260	2009 UT_{15}	—	September 17, 2009	Kitt Peak	Spacewatch	·	1.1 km	MPC · JPL
529261	2009 UB_{16}	—	September 21, 2009	Mount Lemmon	Mount Lemmon Survey	·	1.3 km	MPC · JPL
529262	2009 UG_{25}	—	September 18, 2009	Mount Lemmon	Mount Lemmon Survey	·	850 m	MPC · JPL
529263	2009 UK_{27}	—	October 21, 2009	Catalina	CSS	·	2.2 km	MPC · JPL
529264	2009 UU_{29}	—	October 18, 2009	Mount Lemmon	Mount Lemmon Survey	·	1.3 km	MPC · JPL
529265	2009 US_{35}	—	October 21, 2009	Mount Lemmon	Mount Lemmon Survey	·	1.2 km	MPC · JPL
529266	2009 UX_{35}	—	October 22, 2009	Mount Lemmon	Mount Lemmon Survey	·	1.2 km	MPC · JPL
529267	2009 UB_{39}	—	September 19, 2009	Mount Lemmon	Mount Lemmon Survey	BRA	1.5 km	MPC · JPL
529268	2009 UF_{39}	—	October 22, 2009	Mount Lemmon	Mount Lemmon Survey	·	2.0 km	MPC · JPL
529269	2009 UW_{39}	—	October 22, 2009	Mount Lemmon	Mount Lemmon Survey	·	1.5 km	MPC · JPL
529270	2009 UG_{40}	—	August 29, 2009	Kitt Peak	Spacewatch	·	2.5 km	MPC · JPL
529271	2009 UQ_{42}	—	September 15, 2009	Kitt Peak	Spacewatch	·	1.6 km	MPC · JPL
529272	2009 UA_{45}	—	September 17, 2009	Mount Lemmon	Mount Lemmon Survey	·	1.9 km	MPC · JPL
529273	2009 UV_{47}	—	October 19, 2009	Kitt Peak	Spacewatch	·	1.7 km	MPC · JPL
529274	2009 UM_{49}	—	September 19, 2009	Kitt Peak	Spacewatch	JUN	950 m	MPC · JPL
529275	2009 UN_{61}	—	October 17, 2009	Mount Lemmon	Mount Lemmon Survey	MAR	830 m	MPC · JPL
529276	2009 UN_{66}	—	September 21, 2009	Kitt Peak	Spacewatch	HNS	990 m	MPC · JPL
529277	2009 UM_{72}	—	October 23, 2009	Mount Lemmon	Mount Lemmon Survey	·	1.4 km	MPC · JPL
529278	2009 UQ_{73}	—	September 22, 2009	Mount Lemmon	Mount Lemmon Survey	·	1.7 km	MPC · JPL
529279	2009 UD_{74}	—	September 16, 2009	Kitt Peak	Spacewatch	·	1.2 km	MPC · JPL
529280	2009 UU_{74}	—	October 21, 2009	Mount Lemmon	Mount Lemmon Survey	EUN	910 m	MPC · JPL
529281	2009 UT_{83}	—	October 23, 2009	Mount Lemmon	Mount Lemmon Survey	·	1.3 km	MPC · JPL
529282	2009 UB_{89}	—	October 18, 2009	La Sagra	OAM	·	1.9 km	MPC · JPL
529283	2009 US_{91}	—	October 18, 2009	Catalina	CSS	CLO	1.9 km	MPC · JPL
529284	2009 UX_{93}	—	September 20, 2009	Catalina	CSS	·	2.2 km	MPC · JPL
529285	2009 UY_{95}	—	September 28, 2009	Kitt Peak	Spacewatch	GEF	1.0 km	MPC · JPL
529286	2009 UB_{97}	—	September 21, 2009	Mount Lemmon	Mount Lemmon Survey	·	1.9 km	MPC · JPL
529287	2009 UC_{101}	—	October 23, 2009	Mount Lemmon	Mount Lemmon Survey	·	1.1 km	MPC · JPL
529288	2009 UE_{103}	—	September 28, 2009	Mount Lemmon	Mount Lemmon Survey	·	2.6 km	MPC · JPL
529289	2009 UY_{103}	—	October 25, 2009	Catalina	CSS	ADE	1.8 km	MPC · JPL
529290	2009 UW_{110}	—	October 23, 2009	Kitt Peak	Spacewatch	·	1.9 km	MPC · JPL
529291	2009 UA_{111}	—	October 23, 2009	Kitt Peak	Spacewatch	·	1.8 km	MPC · JPL
529292	2009 UY_{111}	—	October 24, 2009	Kitt Peak	Spacewatch	·	1.8 km	MPC · JPL
529293	2009 UZ_{111}	—	September 19, 2009	Mount Lemmon	Mount Lemmon Survey	HOF	2.6 km	MPC · JPL
529294	2009 UG_{112}	—	October 25, 2009	Kitt Peak	Spacewatch	·	2.1 km	MPC · JPL
529295	2009 UT_{117}	—	December 25, 2005	Kitt Peak	Spacewatch	·	1.3 km	MPC · JPL
529296	2009 UV_{120}	—	October 23, 2009	Mount Lemmon	Mount Lemmon Survey	·	1.1 km	MPC · JPL
529297	2009 UJ_{121}	—	October 14, 2009	Catalina	CSS	·	2.3 km	MPC · JPL
529298	2009 UE_{125}	—	September 15, 2009	Kitt Peak	Spacewatch	·	1.3 km	MPC · JPL
529299	2009 UY_{126}	—	September 29, 2009	Mount Lemmon	Mount Lemmon Survey	·	1.6 km	MPC · JPL
529300	2009 UP_{127}	—	October 15, 2009	La Sagra	OAM	·	2.1 km	MPC · JPL

== 529301–529400 ==
back to top

Designation			Discovery			Properties		Ref
Permanent	Provisional	Named after	Date	Site	Discoverer(s)	Category	Diam.	Ref
529301	2009 UY_{129}	—	October 13, 2009	La Sagra	OAM	·	1.7 km	MPC · JPL
529302	2009 UB_{133}	—	April 4, 2003	Kitt Peak	Spacewatch	·	2.6 km	MPC · JPL
529303	2009 US_{135}	—	October 18, 2009	La Sagra	OAM	·	1.4 km	MPC · JPL
529304	2009 UY_{135}	—	September 29, 2009	Mount Lemmon	Mount Lemmon Survey	·	1.4 km	MPC · JPL
529305	2009 UL_{137}	—	September 29, 2009	Mount Lemmon	Mount Lemmon Survey	·	1.3 km	MPC · JPL
529306	2009 UC_{138}	—	October 26, 2009	Kitt Peak	Spacewatch	·	1.4 km	MPC · JPL
529307	2009 UE_{146}	—	October 22, 2009	Mount Lemmon	Mount Lemmon Survey	·	1.3 km	MPC · JPL
529308	2009 UE_{147}	—	October 22, 2009	Mount Lemmon	Mount Lemmon Survey	·	1.6 km	MPC · JPL
529309	2009 UA_{148}	—	October 18, 2009	Mount Lemmon	Mount Lemmon Survey	·	1.6 km	MPC · JPL
529310	2009 UQ_{148}	—	October 23, 2009	Mount Lemmon	Mount Lemmon Survey	·	1.2 km	MPC · JPL
529311	2009 UW_{152}	—	October 22, 2009	Mount Lemmon	Mount Lemmon Survey	·	1.8 km	MPC · JPL
529312	2009 UF_{159}	—	September 30, 2010	Mount Lemmon	Mount Lemmon Survey	3:2 · SHU	5.1 km	MPC · JPL
529313	2009 UM_{159}	—	September 30, 1995	Kitt Peak	Spacewatch	PAD	1.2 km	MPC · JPL
529314	2009 UJ_{160}	—	October 23, 2009	Kitt Peak	Spacewatch	·	1.6 km	MPC · JPL
529315	2009 UL_{160}	—	October 24, 2009	Kitt Peak	Spacewatch	·	670 m	MPC · JPL
529316	2009 UT_{160}	—	October 18, 2009	Mount Lemmon	Mount Lemmon Survey	·	1.1 km	MPC · JPL
529317	2009 VF_{2}	—	November 9, 2009	Socorro	LINEAR	·	1.9 km	MPC · JPL
529318	2009 VK_{2}	—	June 24, 2009	Mount Lemmon	Mount Lemmon Survey	(1547)	1.4 km	MPC · JPL
529319	2009 VT_{4}	—	December 5, 2005	Mount Lemmon	Mount Lemmon Survey	·	1.5 km	MPC · JPL
529320	2009 VO_{8}	—	October 24, 2009	Kitt Peak	Spacewatch	·	1.2 km	MPC · JPL
529321	2009 VR_{14}	—	November 8, 2009	Mount Lemmon	Mount Lemmon Survey	·	1.5 km	MPC · JPL
529322	2009 VA_{16}	—	September 18, 2009	Mount Lemmon	Mount Lemmon Survey	·	1.3 km	MPC · JPL
529323	2009 VV_{16}	—	September 30, 2009	Mount Lemmon	Mount Lemmon Survey	·	1.3 km	MPC · JPL
529324	2009 VG_{27}	—	October 24, 2009	Catalina	CSS	·	1.2 km	MPC · JPL
529325	2009 VN_{28}	—	October 14, 2009	La Sagra	OAM	·	2.5 km	MPC · JPL
529326	2009 VX_{28}	—	November 8, 2009	Kitt Peak	Spacewatch	·	1.2 km	MPC · JPL
529327	2009 VS_{34}	—	November 10, 2009	Mount Lemmon	Mount Lemmon Survey	·	1.1 km	MPC · JPL
529328	2009 VE_{38}	—	October 23, 2009	Mount Lemmon	Mount Lemmon Survey	·	1.7 km	MPC · JPL
529329	2009 VG_{39}	—	October 16, 2009	Mount Lemmon	Mount Lemmon Survey	·	1.7 km	MPC · JPL
529330	2009 VR_{50}	—	November 8, 2009	Kitt Peak	Spacewatch	EUN	1.3 km	MPC · JPL
529331	2009 VY_{54}	—	November 10, 2009	Kitt Peak	Spacewatch	·	1.9 km	MPC · JPL
529332	2009 VK_{55}	—	November 11, 2009	Kitt Peak	Spacewatch	·	700 m	MPC · JPL
529333	2009 VL_{55}	—	September 23, 2009	Mount Lemmon	Mount Lemmon Survey	MAR	970 m	MPC · JPL
529334	2009 VT_{59}	—	November 9, 2009	Catalina	CSS	·	2.0 km	MPC · JPL
529335	2009 VF_{61}	—	September 19, 2009	Mount Lemmon	Mount Lemmon Survey	(5)	1.3 km	MPC · JPL
529336	2009 VL_{61}	—	November 8, 2009	Kitt Peak	Spacewatch	·	1.0 km	MPC · JPL
529337	2009 VF_{64}	—	November 8, 2009	Kitt Peak	Spacewatch	·	1.4 km	MPC · JPL
529338	2009 VV_{64}	—	November 9, 2009	Kitt Peak	Spacewatch	·	820 m	MPC · JPL
529339	2009 VV_{68}	—	November 9, 2009	Kitt Peak	Spacewatch	·	1.2 km	MPC · JPL
529340	2009 VZ_{72}	—	September 25, 2009	Catalina	CSS	·	1.7 km	MPC · JPL
529341	2009 VD_{75}	—	October 27, 2009	Kitt Peak	Spacewatch	·	1.9 km	MPC · JPL
529342	2009 VW_{76}	—	September 18, 2009	Mount Lemmon	Mount Lemmon Survey	·	1.3 km	MPC · JPL
529343	2009 VJ_{77}	—	October 15, 2009	La Sagra	OAM	·	2.8 km	MPC · JPL
529344	2009 VO_{77}	—	January 25, 2006	Kitt Peak	Spacewatch	·	2.1 km	MPC · JPL
529345	2009 VA_{78}	—	November 9, 2009	Catalina	CSS	·	2.0 km	MPC · JPL
529346	2009 VJ_{79}	—	November 10, 2009	Catalina	CSS	·	2.3 km	MPC · JPL
529347	2009 VL_{79}	—	September 23, 2009	Mount Lemmon	Mount Lemmon Survey	JUN	890 m	MPC · JPL
529348	2009 VY_{81}	—	October 23, 2009	Mount Lemmon	Mount Lemmon Survey	·	1.7 km	MPC · JPL
529349	2009 VE_{90}	—	October 26, 2009	Kitt Peak	Spacewatch	·	1.3 km	MPC · JPL
529350	2009 VC_{92}	—	September 16, 2009	Catalina	CSS	EUN	1.5 km	MPC · JPL
529351	2009 VP_{95}	—	October 12, 2009	Mount Lemmon	Mount Lemmon Survey	·	1.3 km	MPC · JPL
529352	2009 VN_{96}	—	October 22, 2009	Mount Lemmon	Mount Lemmon Survey	·	1.4 km	MPC · JPL
529353	2009 VR_{102}	—	October 26, 2009	Kitt Peak	Spacewatch	·	1.3 km	MPC · JPL
529354	2009 VC_{103}	—	November 11, 2009	Mount Lemmon	Mount Lemmon Survey	·	2.1 km	MPC · JPL
529355	2009 VV_{106}	—	October 12, 2009	Mount Lemmon	Mount Lemmon Survey	·	1.7 km	MPC · JPL
529356	2009 VX_{106}	—	September 29, 2009	Mount Lemmon	Mount Lemmon Survey	GEF	1.4 km	MPC · JPL
529357	2009 VA_{108}	—	January 2, 2006	Mount Lemmon	Mount Lemmon Survey	AGN	1.4 km	MPC · JPL
529358	2009 VF_{111}	—	October 25, 2009	Kitt Peak	Spacewatch	·	3.1 km	MPC · JPL
529359	2009 VW_{111}	—	October 21, 2009	Mount Lemmon	Mount Lemmon Survey	·	2.1 km	MPC · JPL
529360	2009 VN_{114}	—	November 11, 2009	Kitt Peak	Spacewatch	·	1.2 km	MPC · JPL
529361	2009 VS_{115}	—	November 10, 2009	Kitt Peak	Spacewatch	·	1.8 km	MPC · JPL
529362	2009 VF_{116}	—	November 10, 2009	Mount Lemmon	Mount Lemmon Survey	·	2.8 km	MPC · JPL
529363	2009 VA_{119}	—	November 8, 2009	Mount Lemmon	Mount Lemmon Survey	·	2.0 km	MPC · JPL
529364	2009 VF_{119}	—	December 1, 2005	Mount Lemmon	Mount Lemmon Survey	·	1.3 km	MPC · JPL
529365	2009 VO_{119}	—	November 10, 2009	Kitt Peak	Spacewatch	(5)	790 m	MPC · JPL
529366	2009 WM_{1}	—	November 17, 2009	Catalina	CSS	APO · PHA	290 m	MPC · JPL
529367	2009 WR_{12}	—	November 16, 2009	Mount Lemmon	Mount Lemmon Survey	·	1.1 km	MPC · JPL
529368	2009 WD_{15}	—	November 16, 2009	Mount Lemmon	Mount Lemmon Survey	AGN	1.1 km	MPC · JPL
529369	2009 WC_{28}	—	October 27, 2009	Kitt Peak	Spacewatch	·	1.1 km	MPC · JPL
529370	2009 WQ_{30}	—	February 24, 2006	Kitt Peak	Spacewatch	·	1.2 km	MPC · JPL
529371	2009 WL_{31}	—	November 16, 2009	Kitt Peak	Spacewatch	·	780 m	MPC · JPL
529372	2009 WE_{36}	—	July 1, 2005	Kitt Peak	Spacewatch	·	910 m	MPC · JPL
529373	2009 WA_{41}	—	November 9, 2009	Kitt Peak	Spacewatch	·	1.5 km	MPC · JPL
529374	2009 WT_{41}	—	November 17, 2009	Kitt Peak	Spacewatch	·	1.4 km	MPC · JPL
529375	2009 WH_{45}	—	November 18, 2009	Kitt Peak	Spacewatch	MAR	1.3 km	MPC · JPL
529376	2009 WC_{47}	—	September 19, 2009	Mount Lemmon	Mount Lemmon Survey	GAL	1.3 km	MPC · JPL
529377	2009 WT_{47}	—	October 27, 2009	Mount Lemmon	Mount Lemmon Survey	JUN	960 m	MPC · JPL
529378	2009 WR_{56}	—	October 23, 2009	Mount Lemmon	Mount Lemmon Survey	·	1.6 km	MPC · JPL
529379	2009 WZ_{57}	—	December 2, 2005	Kitt Peak	Spacewatch	·	1.2 km	MPC · JPL
529380	2009 WQ_{58}	—	October 23, 2009	Mount Lemmon	Mount Lemmon Survey	·	1.4 km	MPC · JPL
529381	2009 WN_{66}	—	October 23, 2009	Mount Lemmon	Mount Lemmon Survey	·	1.6 km	MPC · JPL
529382	2009 WL_{69}	—	November 17, 2009	Catalina	CSS	·	1.3 km	MPC · JPL
529383	2009 WP_{69}	—	November 9, 2009	Mount Lemmon	Mount Lemmon Survey	·	1.7 km	MPC · JPL
529384	2009 WZ_{71}	—	September 19, 2009	Mount Lemmon	Mount Lemmon Survey	·	810 m	MPC · JPL
529385	2009 WM_{74}	—	October 21, 2009	Mount Lemmon	Mount Lemmon Survey	·	2.1 km	MPC · JPL
529386	2009 WQ_{74}	—	November 18, 2009	Kitt Peak	Spacewatch	·	2.0 km	MPC · JPL
529387	2009 WY_{76}	—	November 18, 2009	Kitt Peak	Spacewatch	·	1.2 km	MPC · JPL
529388	2009 WN_{78}	—	November 10, 2009	Kitt Peak	Spacewatch	·	880 m	MPC · JPL
529389	2009 WY_{79}	—	November 18, 2009	Kitt Peak	Spacewatch	·	1.7 km	MPC · JPL
529390	2009 WH_{84}	—	November 19, 2009	Kitt Peak	Spacewatch	·	1.5 km	MPC · JPL
529391	2009 WD_{85}	—	November 11, 2009	Kitt Peak	Spacewatch	·	2.4 km	MPC · JPL
529392	2009 WN_{87}	—	November 19, 2009	Kitt Peak	Spacewatch	3:2 · (3561)	4.7 km	MPC · JPL
529393	2009 WC_{89}	—	February 25, 2006	Kitt Peak	Spacewatch	·	1.5 km	MPC · JPL
529394	2009 WO_{89}	—	November 19, 2009	Kitt Peak	Spacewatch	·	1.5 km	MPC · JPL
529395	2009 WH_{94}	—	November 8, 2009	Kitt Peak	Spacewatch	·	1.3 km	MPC · JPL
529396	2009 WK_{95}	—	October 23, 2009	Mount Lemmon	Mount Lemmon Survey	·	2.2 km	MPC · JPL
529397	2009 WK_{101}	—	November 10, 2009	Kitt Peak	Spacewatch	·	1.5 km	MPC · JPL
529398	2009 WJ_{103}	—	November 22, 2009	Catalina	CSS	·	2.0 km	MPC · JPL
529399	2009 WD_{116}	—	September 18, 2009	Kitt Peak	Spacewatch	·	1.4 km	MPC · JPL
529400	2009 WX_{118}	—	November 8, 2009	Kitt Peak	Spacewatch	·	1.9 km	MPC · JPL

== 529401–529500 ==
back to top

Designation			Discovery			Properties		Ref
Permanent	Provisional	Named after	Date	Site	Discoverer(s)	Category	Diam.	Ref
529401	2009 WQ_{121}	—	November 20, 2009	Kitt Peak	Spacewatch	·	1.6 km	MPC · JPL
529402	2009 WM_{124}	—	October 16, 2009	Mount Lemmon	Mount Lemmon Survey	·	1.1 km	MPC · JPL
529403	2009 WO_{126}	—	October 26, 2009	Mount Lemmon	Mount Lemmon Survey	·	1.8 km	MPC · JPL
529404	2009 WC_{134}	—	November 22, 2009	Mount Lemmon	Mount Lemmon Survey	·	920 m	MPC · JPL
529405	2009 WF_{142}	—	November 11, 2009	Kitt Peak	Spacewatch	·	1.6 km	MPC · JPL
529406	2009 WJ_{142}	—	November 11, 2009	Kitt Peak	Spacewatch	JUN	740 m	MPC · JPL
529407	2009 WA_{147}	—	November 19, 2009	Mount Lemmon	Mount Lemmon Survey	·	1.5 km	MPC · JPL
529408	2009 WG_{157}	—	March 14, 2007	Kitt Peak	Spacewatch	(5)	1.5 km	MPC · JPL
529409	2009 WE_{161}	—	November 21, 2009	Kitt Peak	Spacewatch	·	1.5 km	MPC · JPL
529410	2009 WG_{164}	—	November 8, 2009	Kitt Peak	Spacewatch	·	2.0 km	MPC · JPL
529411	2009 WZ_{171}	—	November 22, 2009	Mount Lemmon	Mount Lemmon Survey	·	2.4 km	MPC · JPL
529412	2009 WA_{177}	—	October 12, 2009	Mount Lemmon	Mount Lemmon Survey	EUN	950 m	MPC · JPL
529413	2009 WX_{178}	—	November 11, 2009	Kitt Peak	Spacewatch	·	1.5 km	MPC · JPL
529414	2009 WW_{179}	—	November 23, 2009	Mount Lemmon	Mount Lemmon Survey	·	1.2 km	MPC · JPL
529415	2009 WA_{186}	—	October 23, 2009	Mount Lemmon	Mount Lemmon Survey	·	1.8 km	MPC · JPL
529416	2009 WD_{189}	—	October 22, 2009	Mount Lemmon	Mount Lemmon Survey	·	1.6 km	MPC · JPL
529417	2009 WB_{191}	—	October 21, 1995	Kitt Peak	Spacewatch	·	1.4 km	MPC · JPL
529418	2009 WP_{196}	—	November 10, 2009	Kitt Peak	Spacewatch	DOR	2.3 km	MPC · JPL
529419	2009 WH_{198}	—	June 12, 2008	Kitt Peak	Spacewatch	·	2.2 km	MPC · JPL
529420	2009 WA_{199}	—	November 18, 2009	Mount Lemmon	Mount Lemmon Survey	·	2.0 km	MPC · JPL
529421	2009 WK_{203}	—	November 16, 2009	Kitt Peak	Spacewatch	·	1.8 km	MPC · JPL
529422	2009 WE_{216}	—	December 6, 2005	Kitt Peak	Spacewatch	·	1.2 km	MPC · JPL
529423	2009 WF_{217}	—	November 24, 2009	XuYi	PMO NEO Survey Program	·	1.7 km	MPC · JPL
529424	2009 WH_{225}	—	September 22, 2009	Mount Lemmon	Mount Lemmon Survey	·	1.3 km	MPC · JPL
529425	2009 WF_{233}	—	November 17, 2009	Mount Lemmon	Mount Lemmon Survey	·	2.6 km	MPC · JPL
529426	2009 WS_{239}	—	November 17, 2009	Mount Lemmon	Mount Lemmon Survey	·	2.2 km	MPC · JPL
529427	2009 WT_{243}	—	November 19, 2009	Kitt Peak	Spacewatch	·	1.8 km	MPC · JPL
529428	2009 WK_{250}	—	November 10, 2009	Kitt Peak	Spacewatch	EUN	1.3 km	MPC · JPL
529429	2009 WA_{261}	—	October 15, 2009	Kitt Peak	Spacewatch	·	1.9 km	MPC · JPL
529430	2009 WP_{270}	—	November 16, 2009	Mount Lemmon	Mount Lemmon Survey	·	1.3 km	MPC · JPL
529431	2009 WS_{270}	—	November 20, 2009	Kitt Peak	Spacewatch	·	1.2 km	MPC · JPL
529432	2009 XM_{1}	—	December 10, 2009	Mayhill	Nevski, V.	·	1.9 km	MPC · JPL
529433	2009 XV_{11}	—	November 20, 2009	Mount Lemmon	Mount Lemmon Survey	·	1.1 km	MPC · JPL
529434	2009 XD_{16}	—	December 15, 2009	Mount Lemmon	Mount Lemmon Survey	JUN	810 m	MPC · JPL
529435	2009 XV_{16}	—	November 16, 2009	Mount Lemmon	Mount Lemmon Survey	·	2.8 km	MPC · JPL
529436	2009 XX_{21}	—	December 15, 2009	Mount Lemmon	Mount Lemmon Survey	·	1.1 km	MPC · JPL
529437	2009 XJ_{23}	—	November 10, 2009	Catalina	CSS	(18466)	2.2 km	MPC · JPL
529438	2009 YN_{1}	—	November 23, 2009	Mount Lemmon	Mount Lemmon Survey	·	1.9 km	MPC · JPL
529439	2009 YA_{9}	—	December 16, 2009	Mount Lemmon	Mount Lemmon Survey	HNS	1.0 km	MPC · JPL
529440	2009 YD_{13}	—	November 17, 2009	Mount Lemmon	Mount Lemmon Survey	·	4.3 km	MPC · JPL
529441	2009 YU_{14}	—	November 10, 2004	Kitt Peak	Spacewatch	·	2.3 km	MPC · JPL
529442	2009 YZ_{14}	—	December 18, 2009	Mount Lemmon	Mount Lemmon Survey	(1547)	1.9 km	MPC · JPL
529443	2009 YG_{15}	—	December 18, 2009	Kitt Peak	Spacewatch	EUN	1.2 km	MPC · JPL
529444	2009 YM_{16}	—	December 19, 2009	Kitt Peak	Spacewatch	·	3.7 km	MPC · JPL
529445	2009 YV_{16}	—	December 18, 2009	Kitt Peak	Spacewatch	·	2.4 km	MPC · JPL
529446	2009 YA_{23}	—	December 19, 2009	Kitt Peak	Spacewatch	·	1.7 km	MPC · JPL
529447	2009 YG_{25}	—	November 17, 2009	Mount Lemmon	Mount Lemmon Survey	·	1.3 km	MPC · JPL
529448	2009 YK_{26}	—	December 18, 2009	Kitt Peak	Spacewatch	·	1.6 km	MPC · JPL
529449	2009 YO_{26}	—	October 24, 2003	Kitt Peak	Spacewatch	EOS	2.5 km	MPC · JPL
529450	2010 AK	—	January 6, 2010	Kitt Peak	Spacewatch	APO	500 m	MPC · JPL
529451	2010 AJ_{4}	—	January 4, 2010	Kitt Peak	Spacewatch	·	1.4 km	MPC · JPL
529452	2010 AR_{24}	—	December 17, 2009	Mount Lemmon	Mount Lemmon Survey	·	1.9 km	MPC · JPL
529453	2010 AU_{27}	—	December 25, 2009	Kitt Peak	Spacewatch	·	970 m	MPC · JPL
529454	2010 AG_{31}	—	January 6, 2010	Kitt Peak	Spacewatch	·	1.1 km	MPC · JPL
529455	2010 AQ_{34}	—	January 7, 2010	Kitt Peak	Spacewatch	·	1.8 km	MPC · JPL
529456	2010 AN_{39}	—	January 5, 2010	Sierra Stars	R. Kracht	T_{j} (2.86)	3.9 km	MPC · JPL
529457	2010 AD_{40}	—	December 20, 2009	Mount Lemmon	Mount Lemmon Survey	·	1.4 km	MPC · JPL
529458	2010 AL_{43}	—	December 18, 2009	Mount Lemmon	Mount Lemmon Survey	·	1.1 km	MPC · JPL
529459	2010 AA_{53}	—	January 31, 2006	Catalina	CSS	(5)	1.3 km	MPC · JPL
529460	2010 AT_{53}	—	January 8, 2010	Kitt Peak	Spacewatch	·	1.5 km	MPC · JPL
529461	2010 AX_{54}	—	January 8, 2010	Kitt Peak	Spacewatch	·	1.0 km	MPC · JPL
529462	2010 AY_{54}	—	January 8, 2010	Kitt Peak	Spacewatch	·	1.5 km	MPC · JPL
529463	2010 AC_{55}	—	January 8, 2010	Kitt Peak	Spacewatch	·	2.8 km	MPC · JPL
529464	2010 AW_{60}	—	December 20, 2009	Kitt Peak	Spacewatch	·	2.1 km	MPC · JPL
529465	2010 AZ_{60}	—	January 10, 2010	Socorro	LINEAR	T_{j} (2.74) · unusual	3.2 km	MPC · JPL
529466	2010 AD_{64}	—	December 20, 2009	Kitt Peak	Spacewatch	NEM	2.5 km	MPC · JPL
529467	2010 AF_{66}	—	January 11, 2010	Kitt Peak	Spacewatch	·	1.7 km	MPC · JPL
529468	2010 AJ_{74}	—	December 17, 2009	Kitt Peak	Spacewatch	·	3.3 km	MPC · JPL
529469	2010 AQ_{77}	—	December 27, 2009	Kitt Peak	Spacewatch	T_{j} (2.98) · 3:2	5.0 km	MPC · JPL
529470	2010 AN_{92}	—	September 16, 2009	Catalina	CSS	·	2.1 km	MPC · JPL
529471	2010 AW_{92}	—	December 13, 2006	Mount Lemmon	Mount Lemmon Survey	KON	2.9 km	MPC · JPL
529472	2010 AC_{102}	—	September 30, 2009	Mount Lemmon	Mount Lemmon Survey	·	3.3 km	MPC · JPL
529473	2010 AE_{102}	—	March 9, 2007	Kitt Peak	Spacewatch	·	2.5 km	MPC · JPL
529474	2010 AL_{106}	—	May 5, 2010	Mount Lemmon	Mount Lemmon Survey	(7605)	4.7 km	MPC · JPL
529475	2010 AG_{107}	—	September 16, 2009	Kitt Peak	Spacewatch	·	2.5 km	MPC · JPL
529476	2010 AC_{115}	—	January 13, 2010	WISE	WISE	·	3.4 km	MPC · JPL
529477	2010 AJ_{116}	—	January 13, 2010	WISE	WISE	·	1.4 km	MPC · JPL
529478	2010 AL_{118}	—	December 1, 2005	Kitt Peak	Spacewatch	·	3.5 km	MPC · JPL
529479	2010 AE_{119}	—	November 8, 2008	Mount Lemmon	Mount Lemmon Survey	·	3.6 km	MPC · JPL
529480	2010 AR_{120}	—	January 14, 2010	WISE	WISE	·	5.1 km	MPC · JPL
529481	2010 AT_{121}	—	October 2, 2009	Mount Lemmon	Mount Lemmon Survey	·	890 m	MPC · JPL
529482	2010 AH_{128}	—	January 14, 2010	WISE	WISE	·	3.2 km	MPC · JPL
529483	2010 AZ_{140}	—	January 11, 2010	Kitt Peak	Spacewatch	·	2.1 km	MPC · JPL
529484	2010 AA_{141}	—	January 7, 2010	Mount Lemmon	Mount Lemmon Survey	(13314)	1.5 km	MPC · JPL
529485	2010 AE_{144}	—	January 13, 2010	Mount Lemmon	Mount Lemmon Survey	·	2.1 km	MPC · JPL
529486	2010 AF_{144}	—	November 16, 1995	Kitt Peak	Spacewatch	·	1.6 km	MPC · JPL
529487	2010 BX_{5}	—	January 19, 2010	Mauna Kea	D. J. Tholen, M. Micheli	·	3.0 km	MPC · JPL
529488	2010 BX_{9}	—	November 12, 2005	Kitt Peak	Spacewatch	·	1.5 km	MPC · JPL
529489	2010 BO_{13}	—	January 16, 2010	WISE	WISE	·	3.9 km	MPC · JPL
529490	2010 BS_{14}	—	January 16, 2010	WISE	WISE	·	3.0 km	MPC · JPL
529491	2010 BT_{22}	—	November 2, 2000	Kitt Peak	Spacewatch	·	2.2 km	MPC · JPL
529492	2010 BH_{29}	—	December 5, 2005	Mount Lemmon	Mount Lemmon Survey	·	1.8 km	MPC · JPL
529493	2010 BM_{29}	—	October 25, 2009	Kitt Peak	Spacewatch	·	1.8 km	MPC · JPL
529494	2010 BX_{31}	—	September 28, 2000	Socorro	LINEAR	·	960 m	MPC · JPL
529495	2010 BC_{33}	—	January 18, 2010	WISE	WISE	·	3.3 km	MPC · JPL
529496	2010 BP_{33}	—	January 18, 2010	WISE	WISE	·	2.1 km	MPC · JPL
529497	2010 BX_{50}	—	January 20, 2010	WISE	WISE	·	2.3 km	MPC · JPL
529498	2010 BE_{55}	—	October 25, 2009	Kitt Peak	Spacewatch	·	2.2 km	MPC · JPL
529499	2010 BH_{67}	—	March 19, 2010	Kitt Peak	Spacewatch	·	2.5 km	MPC · JPL
529500	2010 BW_{74}	—	January 23, 2010	WISE	WISE	·	3.4 km	MPC · JPL

== 529501–529600 ==
back to top

Designation			Discovery			Properties		Ref
Permanent	Provisional	Named after	Date	Site	Discoverer(s)	Category	Diam.	Ref
529501	2010 BF_{79}	—	December 27, 2006	Mount Lemmon	Mount Lemmon Survey	·	1.4 km	MPC · JPL
529502	2010 BB_{81}	—	May 4, 2010	Zelenchukskaya	T. V. Krjačko, B. Satovski	·	2.6 km	MPC · JPL
529503	2010 BQ_{82}	—	April 15, 2007	Kitt Peak	Spacewatch	·	2.3 km	MPC · JPL
529504	2010 BC_{94}	—	January 27, 2010	WISE	WISE	·	1.8 km	MPC · JPL
529505	2010 BO_{95}	—	October 27, 2009	Mount Lemmon	Mount Lemmon Survey	·	1 km	MPC · JPL
529506	2010 BX_{95}	—	December 30, 2008	Kitt Peak	Spacewatch	·	3.1 km	MPC · JPL
529507	2010 BO_{97}	—	July 28, 2011	Haleakala	Pan-STARRS 1	·	1.7 km	MPC · JPL
529508	2010 BD_{100}	—	January 27, 2010	WISE	WISE	·	2.5 km	MPC · JPL
529509	2010 BG_{101}	—	January 27, 2010	WISE	WISE	·	4.4 km	MPC · JPL
529510	2010 BU_{106}	—	March 16, 2007	Mount Lemmon	Mount Lemmon Survey	·	1.5 km	MPC · JPL
529511	2010 BY_{106}	—	December 4, 2008	Mount Lemmon	Mount Lemmon Survey	·	2.5 km	MPC · JPL
529512	2010 BP_{114}	—	October 24, 2009	Kitt Peak	Spacewatch	·	2.2 km	MPC · JPL
529513	2010 CH_{5}	—	February 27, 1992	Kitt Peak	Spacewatch	·	1.2 km	MPC · JPL
529514	2010 CY_{31}	—	February 9, 2010	Kitt Peak	Spacewatch	·	2.4 km	MPC · JPL
529515	2010 CS_{36}	—	February 25, 2007	Kitt Peak	Spacewatch	·	1.2 km	MPC · JPL
529516	2010 CK_{39}	—	February 13, 2010	Mount Lemmon	Mount Lemmon Survey	·	1.9 km	MPC · JPL
529517	2010 CA_{51}	—	February 13, 2010	WISE	WISE	·	2.6 km	MPC · JPL
529518	2010 CL_{64}	—	February 9, 2010	Mount Lemmon	Mount Lemmon Survey	EUN	920 m	MPC · JPL
529519	2010 CY_{69}	—	January 12, 2010	Kitt Peak	Spacewatch	·	1.6 km	MPC · JPL
529520	2010 CR_{74}	—	February 13, 2010	Mount Lemmon	Mount Lemmon Survey	·	570 m	MPC · JPL
529521	2010 CC_{86}	—	September 4, 2008	Kitt Peak	Spacewatch	HOF	2.7 km	MPC · JPL
529522	2010 CW_{86}	—	October 8, 2008	Kitt Peak	Spacewatch	AEO	1.0 km	MPC · JPL
529523	2010 CO_{91}	—	February 14, 2010	Mount Lemmon	Mount Lemmon Survey	·	2.7 km	MPC · JPL
529524	2010 CV_{95}	—	February 14, 2010	Mount Lemmon	Mount Lemmon Survey	·	3.3 km	MPC · JPL
529525	2010 CG_{98}	—	January 11, 2010	Kitt Peak	Spacewatch	MRX	760 m	MPC · JPL
529526	2010 CN_{108}	—	February 14, 2010	Mount Lemmon	Mount Lemmon Survey	·	540 m	MPC · JPL
529527	2010 CK_{131}	—	February 9, 2010	WISE	WISE	EUP	6.6 km	MPC · JPL
529528	2010 CR_{141}	—	October 24, 2009	Kitt Peak	Spacewatch	·	3.1 km	MPC · JPL
529529	2010 CG_{145}	—	February 9, 2010	Kitt Peak	Spacewatch	·	1.9 km	MPC · JPL
529530	2010 CF_{152}	—	January 11, 2010	Mount Lemmon	Mount Lemmon Survey	EUP	3.3 km	MPC · JPL
529531	2010 CL_{154}	—	February 15, 2010	Kitt Peak	Spacewatch	·	3.3 km	MPC · JPL
529532	2010 CS_{155}	—	February 15, 2010	Kitt Peak	Spacewatch	·	1.8 km	MPC · JPL
529533	2010 CL_{158}	—	February 15, 2010	Mount Lemmon	Mount Lemmon Survey	ADE	1.6 km	MPC · JPL
529534	2010 CR_{167}	—	February 14, 2010	Mount Lemmon	Mount Lemmon Survey	·	3.4 km	MPC · JPL
529535	2010 CA_{169}	—	February 2, 2006	Kitt Peak	Spacewatch	·	1.7 km	MPC · JPL
529536	2010 CH_{171}	—	February 14, 2010	Kitt Peak	Spacewatch	EUN	1.1 km	MPC · JPL
529537	2010 CM_{171}	—	November 9, 2008	Mount Lemmon	Mount Lemmon Survey	·	1.6 km	MPC · JPL
529538	2010 CA_{172}	—	October 29, 2008	Kitt Peak	Spacewatch	·	1.6 km	MPC · JPL
529539	2010 CX_{180}	—	January 8, 2010	Kitt Peak	Spacewatch	·	2.7 km	MPC · JPL
529540	2010 CH_{183}	—	March 4, 2010	Kitt Peak	Spacewatch	·	670 m	MPC · JPL
529541	2010 CL_{185}	—	November 8, 2008	Kitt Peak	Spacewatch	·	2.6 km	MPC · JPL
529542	2010 CK_{188}	—	December 4, 2008	Mount Lemmon	Mount Lemmon Survey	·	2.1 km	MPC · JPL
529543	2010 CN_{194}	—	October 25, 2009	Kitt Peak	Spacewatch	(5)	970 m	MPC · JPL
529544	2010 CO_{197}	—	May 16, 2010	Mount Lemmon	Mount Lemmon Survey	·	3.1 km	MPC · JPL
529545	2010 CY_{222}	—	January 31, 2009	Mount Lemmon	Mount Lemmon Survey	·	2.9 km	MPC · JPL
529546	2010 CB_{227}	—	February 9, 2010	WISE	WISE	·	3.3 km	MPC · JPL
529547	2010 CF_{227}	—	February 9, 2010	WISE	WISE	ADE	1.7 km	MPC · JPL
529548	2010 CB_{233}	—	January 6, 2010	Mount Lemmon	Mount Lemmon Survey	·	3.8 km	MPC · JPL
529549	2010 CZ_{240}	—	March 27, 2011	Kitt Peak	Spacewatch	·	3.0 km	MPC · JPL
529550	2010 CC_{243}	—	November 16, 2009	Mount Lemmon	Mount Lemmon Survey	·	2.2 km	MPC · JPL
529551	2010 CH_{252}	—	February 14, 2010	Kitt Peak	Spacewatch	·	1.7 km	MPC · JPL
529552	2010 CJ_{252}	—	December 1, 2008	Mount Lemmon	Mount Lemmon Survey	·	2.3 km	MPC · JPL
529553	2010 DH_{4}	—	January 11, 2010	Kitt Peak	Spacewatch	·	1.4 km	MPC · JPL
529554	2010 DJ_{15}	—	September 20, 2006	Palomar	NEAT	(10654)	4.3 km	MPC · JPL
529555	2010 DX_{18}	—	November 14, 2006	Catalina	CSS	·	4.2 km	MPC · JPL
529556	2010 DS_{24}	—	October 6, 2004	Kitt Peak	Spacewatch	·	2.1 km	MPC · JPL
529557	2010 DK_{27}	—	November 9, 2009	Mount Lemmon	Mount Lemmon Survey	·	2.5 km	MPC · JPL
529558	2010 DE_{43}	—	February 17, 2010	Kitt Peak	Spacewatch	·	1.5 km	MPC · JPL
529559	2010 DK_{44}	—	February 17, 2010	Kitt Peak	Spacewatch	GEF	2.3 km	MPC · JPL
529560	2010 DP_{45}	—	January 13, 2005	Kitt Peak	Spacewatch	·	1.4 km	MPC · JPL
529561	2010 DB_{49}	—	October 22, 2003	Kitt Peak	Spacewatch	HOF	2.7 km	MPC · JPL
529562	2010 DZ_{49}	—	February 16, 2010	Kitt Peak	Spacewatch	·	2.9 km	MPC · JPL
529563	2010 DD_{50}	—	February 16, 2010	Mount Lemmon	Mount Lemmon Survey	·	1.5 km	MPC · JPL
529564	2010 DL_{54}	—	December 31, 2008	Kitt Peak	Spacewatch	PHO	1.6 km	MPC · JPL
529565	2010 DS_{57}	—	January 8, 2010	Mount Lemmon	Mount Lemmon Survey	·	2.5 km	MPC · JPL
529566	2010 DW_{57}	—	February 24, 2010	WISE	WISE	·	4.1 km	MPC · JPL
529567	2010 DB_{69}	—	February 28, 2010	WISE	WISE	·	4.2 km	MPC · JPL
529568	2010 DQ_{74}	—	February 20, 2010	Kitt Peak	Spacewatch	·	3.1 km	MPC · JPL
529569	2010 DZ_{75}	—	February 18, 2010	Mount Lemmon	Mount Lemmon Survey	·	1.3 km	MPC · JPL
529570	2010 DV_{77}	—	February 16, 2010	Kitt Peak	Spacewatch	·	1.8 km	MPC · JPL
529571	2010 DR_{87}	—	February 26, 2010	WISE	WISE	·	3.2 km	MPC · JPL
529572	2010 DB_{94}	—	July 2, 1998	Kitt Peak	Spacewatch	·	2.2 km	MPC · JPL
529573	2010 EU_{5}	—	December 8, 2009	La Sagra	OAM	·	2.6 km	MPC · JPL
529574	2010 EQ_{7}	—	March 3, 2010	WISE	WISE	ARM	4.0 km	MPC · JPL
529575	2010 EB_{18}	—	March 8, 2010	WISE	WISE	·	3.2 km	MPC · JPL
529576	2010 ER_{18}	—	March 8, 2010	WISE	WISE	·	3.1 km	MPC · JPL
529577	2010 EA_{34}	—	March 5, 2010	Kitt Peak	Spacewatch	·	1.5 km	MPC · JPL
529578	2010 EN_{37}	—	March 12, 2010	Mount Lemmon	Mount Lemmon Survey	·	1.9 km	MPC · JPL
529579	2010 EH_{38}	—	March 12, 2010	Kitt Peak	Spacewatch	·	1.6 km	MPC · JPL
529580	2010 EV_{67}	—	March 13, 2010	Catalina	CSS	·	1.9 km	MPC · JPL
529581	2010 EG_{78}	—	September 23, 2008	Mount Lemmon	Mount Lemmon Survey	·	1.2 km	MPC · JPL
529582	2010 EB_{87}	—	March 13, 2010	Kitt Peak	Spacewatch	526	2.1 km	MPC · JPL
529583	2010 EY_{96}	—	November 27, 2009	Kitt Peak	Spacewatch	·	2.4 km	MPC · JPL
529584	2010 EG_{119}	—	March 15, 2010	WISE	WISE	·	3.1 km	MPC · JPL
529585	2010 EJ_{126}	—	March 14, 2010	Catalina	CSS	PHO	1.4 km	MPC · JPL
529586	2010 EX_{126}	—	March 15, 2010	Catalina	CSS	·	2.3 km	MPC · JPL
529587	2010 EY_{134}	—	March 12, 2010	Kitt Peak	Spacewatch	·	1.8 km	MPC · JPL
529588	2010 EL_{135}	—	March 13, 2010	Kitt Peak	Spacewatch	·	5.1 km	MPC · JPL
529589	2010 EO_{143}	—	March 12, 2010	Siding Spring	SSS	·	2.0 km	MPC · JPL
529590	2010 EX_{147}	—	March 9, 2010	WISE	WISE	ADE	2.1 km	MPC · JPL
529591	2010 EO_{151}	—	November 25, 2009	Kitt Peak	Spacewatch	DOR	2.5 km	MPC · JPL
529592	2010 EJ_{168}	—	September 22, 2008	Mount Lemmon	Mount Lemmon Survey	·	2.8 km	MPC · JPL
529593	2010 EA_{169}	—	January 21, 2002	Kitt Peak	Spacewatch	·	1.8 km	MPC · JPL
529594	2010 EU_{172}	—	July 14, 2016	Haleakala	Pan-STARRS 1	·	1.6 km	MPC · JPL
529595	2010 EL_{173}	—	March 13, 2010	Mount Lemmon	Mount Lemmon Survey	EOS	2.0 km	MPC · JPL
529596	2010 EN_{173}	—	March 12, 2010	Kitt Peak	Spacewatch	·	1.7 km	MPC · JPL
529597	2010 EO_{173}	—	March 12, 2010	Kitt Peak	Spacewatch	·	3.1 km	MPC · JPL
529598	2010 FY_{12}	—	March 12, 2010	Kitt Peak	Spacewatch	DOR	2.5 km	MPC · JPL
529599	2010 FG_{26}	—	March 19, 2010	Mount Lemmon	Mount Lemmon Survey	·	1.5 km	MPC · JPL
529600	2010 FE_{32}	—	March 17, 2010	WISE	WISE	·	3.9 km	MPC · JPL

== 529601–529700 ==
back to top

Designation			Discovery			Properties		Ref
Permanent	Provisional	Named after	Date	Site	Discoverer(s)	Category	Diam.	Ref
529601	2010 FY_{39}	—	March 19, 2010	WISE	WISE	·	2.3 km	MPC · JPL
529602	2010 FZ_{39}	—	March 17, 2007	Kitt Peak	Spacewatch	KON	2.8 km	MPC · JPL
529603	2010 FW_{51}	—	April 18, 2007	Mount Lemmon	Mount Lemmon Survey	·	3.8 km	MPC · JPL
529604	2010 FM_{60}	—	March 26, 2010	WISE	WISE	·	1.9 km	MPC · JPL
529605	2010 FP_{66}	—	March 29, 2010	WISE	WISE	EUN	960 m	MPC · JPL
529606	2010 FP_{77}	—	March 1, 2009	Catalina	CSS	·	4.0 km	MPC · JPL
529607	2010 FA_{82}	—	January 8, 2010	Mount Lemmon	Mount Lemmon Survey	·	1.8 km	MPC · JPL
529608	2010 FJ_{92}	—	March 16, 2010	Catalina	CSS	·	2.3 km	MPC · JPL
529609	2010 FK_{117}	—	March 28, 2010	WISE	WISE	DOR	2.1 km	MPC · JPL
529610	2010 FY_{122}	—	March 18, 2010	Kitt Peak	Spacewatch	·	1.3 km	MPC · JPL
529611	2010 FE_{123}	—	March 18, 2010	Mount Lemmon	Mount Lemmon Survey	EOS	1.6 km	MPC · JPL
529612	2010 FF_{123}	—	March 21, 2010	Kitt Peak	Spacewatch	·	1.5 km	MPC · JPL
529613	2010 GQ_{10}	—	April 2, 2010	WISE	WISE	KON	2.1 km	MPC · JPL
529614	2010 GM_{13}	—	March 6, 2008	Mount Lemmon	Mount Lemmon Survey	·	5.1 km	MPC · JPL
529615	2010 GJ_{17}	—	April 3, 2010	WISE	WISE	·	2.2 km	MPC · JPL
529616	2010 GA_{20}	—	December 18, 2009	Mount Lemmon	Mount Lemmon Survey	KON	1.7 km	MPC · JPL
529617	2010 GX_{29}	—	April 9, 2010	Mount Lemmon	Mount Lemmon Survey	·	1.7 km	MPC · JPL
529618	2010 GB_{48}	—	October 2, 2006	Mount Lemmon	Mount Lemmon Survey	·	3.3 km	MPC · JPL
529619	2010 GH_{48}	—	December 19, 2009	Mount Lemmon	Mount Lemmon Survey	·	1.7 km	MPC · JPL
529620	2010 GA_{50}	—	December 27, 2009	Kitt Peak	Spacewatch	ADE	2.9 km	MPC · JPL
529621	2010 GX_{50}	—	February 13, 2010	Mount Lemmon	Mount Lemmon Survey	·	2.7 km	MPC · JPL
529622	2010 GJ_{76}	—	April 10, 2010	WISE	WISE	·	1.3 km	MPC · JPL
529623	2010 GO_{91}	—	December 19, 2009	Kitt Peak	Spacewatch	3:2	4.4 km	MPC · JPL
529624	2010 GF_{92}	—	April 14, 2010	WISE	WISE	VER	2.8 km	MPC · JPL
529625	2010 GT_{100}	—	April 5, 2010	Kitt Peak	Spacewatch	·	1.9 km	MPC · JPL
529626	2010 GJ_{115}	—	April 4, 2010	Kitt Peak	Spacewatch	·	520 m	MPC · JPL
529627	2010 GA_{118}	—	April 10, 2010	Kitt Peak	Spacewatch	·	1.4 km	MPC · JPL
529628	2010 GR_{150}	—	February 6, 2003	Kitt Peak	Spacewatch	·	6.2 km	MPC · JPL
529629	2010 GU_{158}	—	December 20, 2004	Mount Lemmon	Mount Lemmon Survey	·	2.2 km	MPC · JPL
529630	2010 GW_{158}	—	March 13, 2010	Mount Lemmon	Mount Lemmon Survey	·	1.5 km	MPC · JPL
529631	2010 GY_{158}	—	February 1, 2005	Kitt Peak	Spacewatch	AEO	1.1 km	MPC · JPL
529632	2010 GS_{163}	—	October 8, 2008	Mount Lemmon	Mount Lemmon Survey	·	2.5 km	MPC · JPL
529633	2010 GG_{176}	—	October 12, 2007	Kitt Peak	Spacewatch	·	1.8 km	MPC · JPL
529634	2010 GR_{176}	—	April 9, 2010	Kitt Peak	Spacewatch	·	2.8 km	MPC · JPL
529635	2010 GW_{176}	—	September 11, 2001	Kitt Peak	Spacewatch	·	1.9 km	MPC · JPL
529636	2010 GY_{176}	—	August 24, 2007	Kitt Peak	Spacewatch	WIT	760 m	MPC · JPL
529637	2010 HK_{5}	—	February 27, 2015	Haleakala	Pan-STARRS 1	·	4.3 km	MPC · JPL
529638	2010 HP_{5}	—	November 20, 2003	Kitt Peak	Spacewatch	·	3.3 km	MPC · JPL
529639	2010 HZ_{9}	—	April 5, 2010	Mount Lemmon	Mount Lemmon Survey	·	2.3 km	MPC · JPL
529640	2010 HS_{14}	—	March 25, 2015	Mount Lemmon	Mount Lemmon Survey	·	2.1 km	MPC · JPL
529641	2010 HY_{20}	—	April 20, 2010	Mount Lemmon	Mount Lemmon Survey	·	1.5 km	MPC · JPL
529642	2010 HR_{36}	—	April 21, 2010	WISE	WISE	·	4.1 km	MPC · JPL
529643	2010 HV_{46}	—	April 23, 2010	WISE	WISE	·	4.6 km	MPC · JPL
529644	2010 HF_{50}	—	April 24, 2010	WISE	WISE	·	1.7 km	MPC · JPL
529645	2010 HL_{53}	—	March 5, 2002	Kitt Peak	Spacewatch	·	2.2 km	MPC · JPL
529646	2010 HL_{55}	—	April 25, 2010	WISE	WISE	·	1.7 km	MPC · JPL
529647	2010 HQ_{55}	—	February 20, 2006	Kitt Peak	Spacewatch	·	2.5 km	MPC · JPL
529648	2010 HQ_{62}	—	February 7, 2010	Mount Lemmon	Mount Lemmon Survey	DOR	2.3 km	MPC · JPL
529649	2010 HK_{76}	—	April 28, 2010	WISE	WISE	·	3.4 km	MPC · JPL
529650	2010 HU_{80}	—	April 18, 2010	Kitt Peak	Spacewatch	·	2.4 km	MPC · JPL
529651	2010 HX_{83}	—	April 28, 2010	WISE	WISE	EUP	5.3 km	MPC · JPL
529652	2010 HO_{85}	—	December 22, 2003	Kitt Peak	Spacewatch	·	4.1 km	MPC · JPL
529653	2010 HM_{87}	—	April 29, 2010	WISE	WISE	·	3.0 km	MPC · JPL
529654	2010 HC_{88}	—	April 29, 2010	WISE	WISE	·	3.5 km	MPC · JPL
529655	2010 HN_{89}	—	March 3, 2009	Catalina	CSS	EUP	3.3 km	MPC · JPL
529656	2010 HQ_{90}	—	April 29, 2010	WISE	WISE	·	3.0 km	MPC · JPL
529657	2010 HF_{92}	—	February 2, 2008	Kitt Peak	Spacewatch	·	3.7 km	MPC · JPL
529658	2010 HE_{94}	—	February 9, 2010	Catalina	CSS	DOR	3.1 km	MPC · JPL
529659	2010 HR_{97}	—	November 28, 2005	Mount Lemmon	Mount Lemmon Survey	·	2.7 km	MPC · JPL
529660	2010 HJ_{98}	—	September 4, 2008	Kitt Peak	Spacewatch	·	2.1 km	MPC · JPL
529661	2010 HM_{99}	—	February 25, 2009	Siding Spring	SSS	·	5.4 km	MPC · JPL
529662	2010 HU_{105}	—	January 17, 2005	Kitt Peak	Spacewatch	·	1.1 km	MPC · JPL
529663	2010 HS_{107}	—	April 25, 2010	Kitt Peak	Spacewatch	·	360 m	MPC · JPL
529664	2010 HA_{111}	—	February 26, 2009	Kitt Peak	Spacewatch	EUP	3.6 km	MPC · JPL
529665	2010 JX_{2}	—	October 27, 2006	Mount Lemmon	Mount Lemmon Survey	THM	2.3 km	MPC · JPL
529666	2010 JK_{5}	—	May 1, 2010	WISE	WISE	·	2.6 km	MPC · JPL
529667	2010 JT_{23}	—	April 25, 2003	Kitt Peak	Spacewatch	URS	5.5 km	MPC · JPL
529668	2010 JL_{33}	—	May 6, 2010	Mount Lemmon	Mount Lemmon Survey	T_{j} (2.91) · APO +1km · PHA	1.8 km	MPC · JPL
529669	2010 JC_{34}	—	November 24, 2003	Kitt Peak	Spacewatch	·	2.8 km	MPC · JPL
529670	2010 JT_{34}	—	May 7, 2010	Mount Lemmon	Mount Lemmon Survey	APO	530 m	MPC · JPL
529671	2010 JD_{35}	—	May 6, 2010	Catalina	CSS	H	490 m	MPC · JPL
529672	2010 JU_{49}	—	September 15, 2007	Mount Lemmon	Mount Lemmon Survey	·	1.6 km	MPC · JPL
529673	2010 JW_{63}	—	January 11, 2010	Kitt Peak	Spacewatch	·	3.6 km	MPC · JPL
529674	2010 JG_{75}	—	April 8, 2010	Kitt Peak	Spacewatch	·	1.6 km	MPC · JPL
529675	2010 JV_{75}	—	February 14, 2005	Kitt Peak	Spacewatch	·	1.9 km	MPC · JPL
529676	2010 JN_{79}	—	May 12, 2010	Kitt Peak	Spacewatch	·	2.2 km	MPC · JPL
529677	2010 JS_{87}	—	February 17, 2010	Kitt Peak	Spacewatch	·	3.4 km	MPC · JPL
529678	2010 JL_{100}	—	September 13, 2007	Catalina	CSS	VER	4.6 km	MPC · JPL
529679	2010 JX_{101}	—	November 7, 2008	Mount Lemmon	Mount Lemmon Survey	·	3.5 km	MPC · JPL
529680	2010 JU_{105}	—	October 3, 2005	Catalina	CSS	·	2.9 km	MPC · JPL
529681	2010 JM_{112}	—	April 8, 2010	Kitt Peak	Spacewatch	PHO	770 m	MPC · JPL
529682	2010 JN_{124}	—	April 20, 2009	Mount Lemmon	Mount Lemmon Survey	URS	5.5 km	MPC · JPL
529683	2010 JA_{126}	—	December 28, 2003	Kitt Peak	Spacewatch	·	3.7 km	MPC · JPL
529684	2010 JW_{130}	—	May 13, 2010	WISE	WISE	·	1.8 km	MPC · JPL
529685	2010 JS_{135}	—	May 14, 2010	WISE	WISE	·	4.3 km	MPC · JPL
529686	2010 JJ_{138}	—	January 12, 2010	Kitt Peak	Spacewatch	·	3.2 km	MPC · JPL
529687	2010 JV_{140}	—	April 25, 2003	Kitt Peak	Spacewatch	·	3.3 km	MPC · JPL
529688	2010 JX_{145}	—	March 13, 2008	Mount Lemmon	Mount Lemmon Survey	·	3.1 km	MPC · JPL
529689	2010 JF_{146}	—	May 15, 2010	WISE	WISE	·	1.8 km	MPC · JPL
529690	2010 JB_{155}	—	April 10, 2010	Kitt Peak	Spacewatch	(18466)	1.8 km	MPC · JPL
529691	2010 JM_{176}	—	May 11, 2010	Mount Lemmon	Mount Lemmon Survey	EOS	1.5 km	MPC · JPL
529692	2010 KO_{6}	—	September 24, 2008	Mount Lemmon	Mount Lemmon Survey	EUN	1.1 km	MPC · JPL
529693	2010 KT_{8}	—	April 25, 2010	Mount Lemmon	Mount Lemmon Survey	·	2.0 km	MPC · JPL
529694	2010 KW_{9}	—	May 17, 2010	Kitt Peak	Spacewatch	·	1.8 km	MPC · JPL
529695	2010 KC_{14}	—	May 16, 2010	WISE	WISE	·	2.3 km	MPC · JPL
529696	2010 KU_{17}	—	May 17, 2010	WISE	WISE	·	4.6 km	MPC · JPL
529697	2010 KR_{20}	—	January 25, 2015	Haleakala	Pan-STARRS 1	·	1.5 km	MPC · JPL
529698	2010 KP_{29}	—	March 15, 2005	Catalina	CSS	·	3.3 km	MPC · JPL
529699	2010 KY_{29}	—	August 31, 2005	Kitt Peak	Spacewatch	·	2.1 km	MPC · JPL
529700	2010 KN_{32}	—	May 19, 2010	WISE	WISE	·	1.8 km	MPC · JPL

== 529701–529800 ==
back to top

Designation			Discovery			Properties		Ref
Permanent	Provisional	Named after	Date	Site	Discoverer(s)	Category	Diam.	Ref
529701	2010 KR_{46}	—	May 21, 2010	WISE	WISE	·	2.8 km	MPC · JPL
529702	2010 KU_{48}	—	May 21, 2010	WISE	WISE	·	3.7 km	MPC · JPL
529703	2010 KQ_{55}	—	May 23, 2010	WISE	WISE	·	3.1 km	MPC · JPL
529704	2010 KV_{65}	—	February 18, 2010	Kitt Peak	Spacewatch	·	2.9 km	MPC · JPL
529705	2010 KQ_{66}	—	May 16, 2009	Mount Lemmon	Mount Lemmon Survey	·	3.8 km	MPC · JPL
529706	2010 KN_{69}	—	May 24, 2010	WISE	WISE	·	2.1 km	MPC · JPL
529707	2010 KH_{78}	—	November 2, 2008	Mount Lemmon	Mount Lemmon Survey	·	2.9 km	MPC · JPL
529708	2010 KG_{83}	—	May 26, 2010	WISE	WISE	·	3.3 km	MPC · JPL
529709	2010 KX_{88}	—	May 27, 2010	WISE	WISE	·	4.4 km	MPC · JPL
529710	2010 KR_{90}	—	May 27, 2010	WISE	WISE	·	2.9 km	MPC · JPL
529711	2010 KQ_{98}	—	September 30, 2003	Kitt Peak	Spacewatch	·	4.0 km	MPC · JPL
529712	2010 KZ_{98}	—	May 28, 2010	WISE	WISE	·	1.2 km	MPC · JPL
529713	2010 KN_{99}	—	May 28, 2010	WISE	WISE	·	4.5 km	MPC · JPL
529714	2010 KP_{111}	—	September 26, 2005	Kitt Peak	Spacewatch	·	2.5 km	MPC · JPL
529715	2010 KL_{119}	—	May 30, 2010	WISE	WISE	·	2.8 km	MPC · JPL
529716	2010 KY_{123}	—	August 30, 2005	Kitt Peak	Spacewatch	·	2.5 km	MPC · JPL
529717	2010 KG_{126}	—	May 31, 2010	WISE	WISE	·	2.6 km	MPC · JPL
529718	2010 KY_{127}	—	May 31, 2010	WISE	WISE	T_{j} (2.41) · APO +1km	1.8 km	MPC · JPL
529719	2010 LU_{13}	—	January 30, 2004	Kitt Peak	Spacewatch	·	5.6 km	MPC · JPL
529720	2010 LM_{14}	—	June 2, 2010	WISE	WISE	APO	360 m	MPC · JPL
529721	2010 LV_{21}	—	June 3, 2010	WISE	WISE	EOS	1.6 km	MPC · JPL
529722	2010 LA_{22}	—	June 4, 2010	WISE	WISE	·	3.6 km	MPC · JPL
529723	2010 LG_{27}	—	March 15, 2010	Catalina	CSS	·	2.2 km	MPC · JPL
529724	2010 LR_{29}	—	June 6, 2010	WISE	WISE	·	3.7 km	MPC · JPL
529725	2010 LF_{37}	—	June 6, 2010	WISE	WISE	·	3.4 km	MPC · JPL
529726	2010 LD_{39}	—	November 1, 2007	Kitt Peak	Spacewatch	·	990 m	MPC · JPL
529727	2010 LC_{44}	—	June 7, 2010	WISE	WISE	·	5.0 km	MPC · JPL
529728	2010 LM_{44}	—	June 7, 2010	WISE	WISE	DOR	2.3 km	MPC · JPL
529729 Xida	2010 LX_{44}	Xida	March 2, 2008	XuYi	PMO NEO Survey Program	·	4.7 km	MPC · JPL
529730	2010 LE_{48}	—	June 8, 2010	WISE	WISE	·	3.1 km	MPC · JPL
529731	2010 LY_{48}	—	April 28, 2009	Kitt Peak	Spacewatch	·	2.5 km	MPC · JPL
529732	2010 LX_{50}	—	September 25, 2005	Kitt Peak	Spacewatch	·	4.6 km	MPC · JPL
529733	2010 LK_{52}	—	June 8, 2010	WISE	WISE	NEM	2.7 km	MPC · JPL
529734	2010 LO_{52}	—	December 21, 2008	Catalina	CSS	NAE	3.0 km	MPC · JPL
529735	2010 LN_{57}	—	June 9, 2010	WISE	WISE	·	3.1 km	MPC · JPL
529736	2010 LY_{60}	—	November 2, 2007	Kitt Peak	Spacewatch	·	2.1 km	MPC · JPL
529737	2010 LT_{70}	—	March 19, 2009	Kitt Peak	Spacewatch	·	3.6 km	MPC · JPL
529738	2010 LS_{81}	—	February 17, 2010	Mount Lemmon	Mount Lemmon Survey	·	2.4 km	MPC · JPL
529739	2010 LC_{88}	—	June 12, 2010	WISE	WISE	3:2	4.4 km	MPC · JPL
529740	2010 LP_{88}	—	June 12, 2010	WISE	WISE	·	2.9 km	MPC · JPL
529741	2010 LO_{93}	—	October 27, 2005	Kitt Peak	Spacewatch	·	3.3 km	MPC · JPL
529742	2010 LF_{102}	—	October 8, 2007	Mount Lemmon	Mount Lemmon Survey	URS	4.7 km	MPC · JPL
529743	2010 LT_{103}	—	June 13, 2010	WISE	WISE	·	3.3 km	MPC · JPL
529744	2010 LE_{113}	—	April 19, 2010	WISE	WISE	PHO	2.1 km	MPC · JPL
529745	2010 LJ_{121}	—	June 14, 2010	WISE	WISE	EOS	2.8 km	MPC · JPL
529746	2010 LP_{123}	—	March 12, 2010	Catalina	CSS	·	2.8 km	MPC · JPL
529747	2010 LS_{123}	—	June 14, 2010	WISE	WISE	·	4.2 km	MPC · JPL
529748	2010 LP_{126}	—	June 15, 2010	WISE	WISE	·	3.2 km	MPC · JPL
529749	2010 LT_{126}	—	September 15, 2007	Catalina	CSS	·	3.4 km	MPC · JPL
529750	2010 LA_{129}	—	September 23, 2005	Kitt Peak	Spacewatch	·	3.1 km	MPC · JPL
529751	2010 LC_{130}	—	June 15, 2010	WISE	WISE	·	3.7 km	MPC · JPL
529752	2010 MR	—	June 16, 2010	Mount Lemmon	Mount Lemmon Survey	AMO	670 m	MPC · JPL
529753	2010 MF_{1}	—	June 18, 2010	Siding Spring	SSS	AMO · PHA	360 m	MPC · JPL
529754	2010 MK_{4}	—	June 21, 2010	Mount Lemmon	Mount Lemmon Survey	·	880 m	MPC · JPL
529755	2010 MJ_{14}	—	May 8, 2006	Mount Lemmon	Mount Lemmon Survey	·	2.4 km	MPC · JPL
529756	2010 MG_{15}	—	June 17, 2010	WISE	WISE	PHO	2.7 km	MPC · JPL
529757	2010 MX_{15}	—	June 17, 2010	WISE	WISE	·	1.7 km	MPC · JPL
529758	2010 MG_{23}	—	March 9, 2007	Mount Lemmon	Mount Lemmon Survey	CYB	4.7 km	MPC · JPL
529759	2010 ML_{35}	—	September 29, 2005	Kitt Peak	Spacewatch	·	3.1 km	MPC · JPL
529760	2010 MC_{42}	—	November 25, 2005	Catalina	CSS	·	3.8 km	MPC · JPL
529761	2010 ML_{44}	—	October 27, 2005	Catalina	CSS	·	3.6 km	MPC · JPL
529762	2010 MS_{45}	—	June 22, 2010	WISE	WISE	·	2.8 km	MPC · JPL
529763	2010 MG_{50}	—	April 4, 2008	Kitt Peak	Spacewatch	T_{j} (2.99)	5.0 km	MPC · JPL
529764	2010 MM_{50}	—	June 23, 2010	WISE	WISE	·	2.5 km	MPC · JPL
529765	2010 ML_{54}	—	October 3, 2008	Mount Lemmon	Mount Lemmon Survey	·	3.0 km	MPC · JPL
529766	2010 MS_{56}	—	June 24, 2010	WISE	WISE	·	2.9 km	MPC · JPL
529767	2010 MS_{58}	—	June 24, 2010	WISE	WISE	·	2.1 km	MPC · JPL
529768	2010 ME_{70}	—	June 25, 2010	WISE	WISE	·	2.2 km	MPC · JPL
529769	2010 MY_{70}	—	March 16, 2010	Mount Lemmon	Mount Lemmon Survey	·	3.0 km	MPC · JPL
529770	2010 MJ_{76}	—	November 8, 2008	Mount Lemmon	Mount Lemmon Survey	·	2.7 km	MPC · JPL
529771	2010 MZ_{76}	—	March 25, 2010	Mount Lemmon	Mount Lemmon Survey	URS	3.1 km	MPC · JPL
529772	2010 ML_{85}	—	June 27, 2010	WISE	WISE	·	4.8 km	MPC · JPL
529773	2010 MY_{96}	—	February 9, 2005	Mount Lemmon	Mount Lemmon Survey	·	2.5 km	MPC · JPL
529774	2010 MT_{97}	—	January 14, 2010	WISE	WISE	·	3.1 km	MPC · JPL
529775	2010 MX_{98}	—	June 29, 2010	WISE	WISE	·	3.3 km	MPC · JPL
529776	2010 MP_{100}	—	March 13, 2010	Mount Lemmon	Mount Lemmon Survey	DOR	1.8 km	MPC · JPL
529777	2010 MS_{109}	—	April 28, 2003	Kitt Peak	Spacewatch	·	5.2 km	MPC · JPL
529778	2010 MZ_{110}	—	October 28, 2005	Kitt Peak	Spacewatch	·	5.4 km	MPC · JPL
529779	2010 MM_{113}	—	June 21, 2010	Mount Lemmon	Mount Lemmon Survey	·	680 m	MPC · JPL
529780	2010 MQ_{116}	—	June 16, 2010	Haleakala	Pan-STARRS 1	res · 3:5	325 km	MPC · JPL
529781	2010 NX	—	July 3, 2010	WISE	WISE	·	1.2 km	MPC · JPL
529782	2010 NY_{9}	—	December 2, 2008	Kitt Peak	Spacewatch	·	3.5 km	MPC · JPL
529783	2010 NP_{36}	—	July 8, 2010	WISE	WISE	·	1.1 km	MPC · JPL
529784	2010 NK_{70}	—	July 14, 2010	WISE	WISE	T_{j} (2.97)	4.4 km	MPC · JPL
529785	2010 ND_{77}	—	April 14, 2008	Kitt Peak	Spacewatch	·	4.2 km	MPC · JPL
529786	2010 NB_{79}	—	July 15, 2010	WISE	WISE	EOS	3.1 km	MPC · JPL
529787	2010 NR_{84}	—	July 1, 2010	WISE	WISE	·	3.8 km	MPC · JPL
529788	2010 NS_{101}	—	July 12, 2010	WISE	WISE	·	2.6 km	MPC · JPL
529789	2010 NW_{106}	—	July 12, 2010	WISE	WISE	·	3.0 km	MPC · JPL
529790	2010 NP_{118}	—	July 7, 2010	Mount Lemmon	Mount Lemmon Survey	·	750 m	MPC · JPL
529791	2010 OX_{5}	—	December 15, 2006	Mount Lemmon	Mount Lemmon Survey	·	790 m	MPC · JPL
529792	2010 OD_{6}	—	March 9, 2007	Mount Lemmon	Mount Lemmon Survey	·	3.1 km	MPC · JPL
529793	2010 OO_{9}	—	July 16, 2010	WISE	WISE	·	1.4 km	MPC · JPL
529794	2010 OA_{10}	—	November 13, 2007	Mount Lemmon	Mount Lemmon Survey	·	4.5 km	MPC · JPL
529795	2010 OZ_{14}	—	December 7, 2005	Kitt Peak	Spacewatch	·	3.8 km	MPC · JPL
529796	2010 OC_{17}	—	October 25, 2005	Kitt Peak	Spacewatch	·	2.9 km	MPC · JPL
529797	2010 OA_{19}	—	July 18, 2010	WISE	WISE	CYB	3.4 km	MPC · JPL
529798	2010 OM_{20}	—	July 18, 2010	WISE	WISE	T_{j} (2.99) · 3:2	3.2 km	MPC · JPL
529799	2010 OD_{26}	—	July 19, 2010	WISE	WISE	·	1.4 km	MPC · JPL
529800	2010 OF_{29}	—	October 21, 2006	Catalina	CSS	(194)	1.7 km	MPC · JPL

== 529801–529900 ==
back to top

Designation			Discovery			Properties		Ref
Permanent	Provisional	Named after	Date	Site	Discoverer(s)	Category	Diam.	Ref
529801	2010 OL_{30}	—	October 9, 1994	Kitt Peak	Spacewatch	T_{j} (2.98) · 3:2	3.8 km	MPC · JPL
529802	2010 OP_{39}	—	March 4, 2008	Kitt Peak	Spacewatch	·	3.6 km	MPC · JPL
529803	2010 OU_{39}	—	July 21, 2010	WISE	WISE	·	3.2 km	MPC · JPL
529804	2010 OW_{40}	—	April 28, 2008	Kitt Peak	Spacewatch	·	2.9 km	MPC · JPL
529805	2010 ON_{54}	—	July 23, 2010	WISE	WISE	·	3.6 km	MPC · JPL
529806	2010 OM_{65}	—	November 17, 2006	Mount Lemmon	Mount Lemmon Survey	·	1.6 km	MPC · JPL
529807	2010 OS_{75}	—	July 26, 2010	WISE	WISE	(194)	1.7 km	MPC · JPL
529808	2010 OB_{79}	—	July 26, 2010	WISE	WISE	3:2	4.7 km	MPC · JPL
529809	2010 OS_{79}	—	April 11, 2010	Mount Lemmon	Mount Lemmon Survey	·	2.5 km	MPC · JPL
529810	2010 OO_{81}	—	July 26, 2010	WISE	WISE	·	3.4 km	MPC · JPL
529811	2010 OG_{83}	—	April 10, 2005	Kitt Peak	Spacewatch	·	2.7 km	MPC · JPL
529812	2010 OV_{94}	—	July 28, 2010	WISE	WISE	·	2.9 km	MPC · JPL
529813	2010 OU_{101}	—	July 28, 2010	WISE	WISE	·	3.6 km	MPC · JPL
529814	2010 OK_{113}	—	July 30, 2010	WISE	WISE	·	2.4 km	MPC · JPL
529815	2010 PG_{17}	—	May 9, 2010	Mount Lemmon	Mount Lemmon Survey	·	2.6 km	MPC · JPL
529816	2010 PB_{24}	—	August 4, 2010	La Sagra	OAM	·	1.3 km	MPC · JPL
529817	2010 PN_{50}	—	August 7, 2010	WISE	WISE	KON	1.9 km	MPC · JPL
529818	2010 PE_{58}	—	August 10, 2010	La Sagra	OAM	·	1.1 km	MPC · JPL
529819	2010 PM_{58}	—	August 1, 2010	WISE	WISE	APO	260 m	MPC · JPL
529820	2010 PR_{60}	—	August 10, 2010	Kitt Peak	Spacewatch	·	860 m	MPC · JPL
529821	2010 PH_{63}	—	August 13, 2010	Socorro	LINEAR	·	950 m	MPC · JPL
529822	2010 PQ_{73}	—	August 7, 2010	La Sagra	OAM	·	950 m	MPC · JPL
529823	2010 PP_{81}	—	August 1, 2010	Haleakala	Pan-STARRS 1	SDO	163 km	MPC · JPL
529824	2010 QJ	—	August 16, 2010	La Sagra	OAM	·	1.4 km	MPC · JPL
529825	2010 QE_{4}	—	August 29, 2010	La Sagra	OAM	·	1.1 km	MPC · JPL
529826	2010 RR_{2}	—	September 2, 2010	Mount Lemmon	Mount Lemmon Survey	·	930 m	MPC · JPL
529827	2010 RK_{21}	—	August 13, 2010	Kitt Peak	Spacewatch	·	1.0 km	MPC · JPL
529828 Jinhuayizhong	2010 RJ_{22}	Jinhuayizhong	August 8, 2010	XuYi	PMO NEO Survey Program	·	1.2 km	MPC · JPL
529829	2010 RE_{37}	—	September 3, 2010	Piszkéstető	K. Sárneczky, Kuli, Z.	·	620 m	MPC · JPL
529830	2010 RO_{44}	—	September 2, 2010	Mount Lemmon	Mount Lemmon Survey	NYS	1.0 km	MPC · JPL
529831	2010 RQ_{47}	—	September 4, 2010	Kitt Peak	Spacewatch	NYS	780 m	MPC · JPL
529832	2010 RV_{47}	—	September 4, 2010	Kitt Peak	Spacewatch	·	660 m	MPC · JPL
529833	2010 RH_{48}	—	September 4, 2010	Kitt Peak	Spacewatch	·	900 m	MPC · JPL
529834	2010 RC_{52}	—	September 4, 2010	Kitt Peak	Spacewatch	NYS	970 m	MPC · JPL
529835	2010 RB_{55}	—	September 5, 2010	La Sagra	OAM	·	1.2 km	MPC · JPL
529836	2010 RX_{64}	—	September 1, 2010	Mount Lemmon	Mount Lemmon Survey	MAS	580 m	MPC · JPL
529837	2010 RQ_{68}	—	September 6, 2010	La Sagra	OAM	·	1.5 km	MPC · JPL
529838	2010 RL_{69}	—	July 21, 2006	Mount Lemmon	Mount Lemmon Survey	MAS	580 m	MPC · JPL
529839	2010 RS_{70}	—	September 2, 2010	Mount Lemmon	Mount Lemmon Survey	·	890 m	MPC · JPL
529840	2010 RY_{78}	—	September 2, 2010	Mount Lemmon	Mount Lemmon Survey	·	950 m	MPC · JPL
529841	2010 RL_{79}	—	September 2, 2010	La Sagra	OAM	·	680 m	MPC · JPL
529842	2010 RO_{79}	—	September 3, 2010	La Sagra	OAM	·	2.0 km	MPC · JPL
529843	2010 RV_{79}	—	September 4, 2010	La Sagra	OAM	·	1.2 km	MPC · JPL
529844	2010 RR_{98}	—	August 29, 2006	Kitt Peak	Spacewatch	·	880 m	MPC · JPL
529845	2010 RM_{99}	—	September 10, 2010	Kitt Peak	Spacewatch	·	500 m	MPC · JPL
529846	2010 RD_{100}	—	September 10, 2010	Kitt Peak	Spacewatch	·	960 m	MPC · JPL
529847	2010 RB_{104}	—	September 19, 2006	Kitt Peak	Spacewatch	·	640 m	MPC · JPL
529848	2010 RX_{108}	—	September 11, 2010	Kitt Peak	Spacewatch	·	2.6 km	MPC · JPL
529849	2010 RZ_{108}	—	September 11, 2010	Kitt Peak	Spacewatch	·	1.1 km	MPC · JPL
529850	2010 RK_{112}	—	September 11, 2010	Kitt Peak	Spacewatch	·	1.1 km	MPC · JPL
529851	2010 RM_{112}	—	September 11, 2010	Kitt Peak	Spacewatch	MAS	570 m	MPC · JPL
529852	2010 RO_{112}	—	September 11, 2010	Kitt Peak	Spacewatch	·	850 m	MPC · JPL
529853	2010 RB_{118}	—	September 11, 2010	Kitt Peak	Spacewatch	·	740 m	MPC · JPL
529854	2010 RV_{123}	—	August 28, 2006	Kitt Peak	Spacewatch	·	620 m	MPC · JPL
529855	2010 RR_{125}	—	September 12, 2010	Kitt Peak	Spacewatch	3:2	3.9 km	MPC · JPL
529856	2010 RV_{125}	—	September 12, 2010	Kitt Peak	Spacewatch	NYS	1.1 km	MPC · JPL
529857	2010 RC_{126}	—	September 12, 2010	Kitt Peak	Spacewatch	·	600 m	MPC · JPL
529858	2010 RK_{133}	—	September 15, 2010	Catalina	CSS	H	410 m	MPC · JPL
529859	2010 RX_{134}	—	September 15, 2010	Kitt Peak	Spacewatch	·	1.9 km	MPC · JPL
529860	2010 RD_{136}	—	September 11, 2010	Kitt Peak	Spacewatch	MAS	550 m	MPC · JPL
529861	2010 RD_{141}	—	October 20, 2007	Mount Lemmon	Mount Lemmon Survey	·	560 m	MPC · JPL
529862	2010 RP_{143}	—	September 6, 2010	Kitt Peak	Spacewatch	·	2.7 km	MPC · JPL
529863	2010 RB_{145}	—	September 14, 2010	Kitt Peak	Spacewatch	EOS	1.7 km	MPC · JPL
529864	2010 RE_{152}	—	August 5, 2010	Kitt Peak	Spacewatch	PHO	1.1 km	MPC · JPL
529865	2010 RN_{156}	—	September 15, 2010	Kitt Peak	Spacewatch	·	1.0 km	MPC · JPL
529866	2010 RK_{164}	—	September 6, 2010	La Sagra	OAM	PHO	1.2 km	MPC · JPL
529867	2010 RE_{166}	—	September 10, 2010	Mount Lemmon	Mount Lemmon Survey	·	1.1 km	MPC · JPL
529868	2010 RZ_{171}	—	September 15, 2006	Kitt Peak	Spacewatch	·	710 m	MPC · JPL
529869	2010 RS_{174}	—	September 9, 2010	Kitt Peak	Spacewatch	·	540 m	MPC · JPL
529870	2010 RU_{175}	—	September 10, 2010	Kitt Peak	Spacewatch	·	2.5 km	MPC · JPL
529871	2010 RE_{181}	—	September 30, 2005	Mount Lemmon	Mount Lemmon Survey	·	1.7 km	MPC · JPL
529872	2010 RN_{189}	—	September 11, 2010	Mount Lemmon	Mount Lemmon Survey	V	660 m	MPC · JPL
529873	2010 RU_{189}	—	September 2, 2010	Mount Lemmon	Mount Lemmon Survey	·	2.4 km	MPC · JPL
529874	2010 RZ_{189}	—	September 14, 1996	Kitt Peak	Spacewatch	·	860 m	MPC · JPL
529875	2010 RA_{190}	—	November 12, 2007	Mount Lemmon	Mount Lemmon Survey	·	710 m	MPC · JPL
529876	2010 RB_{190}	—	September 10, 2010	Mount Lemmon	Mount Lemmon Survey	·	630 m	MPC · JPL
529877	2010 SO_{4}	—	September 2, 2010	Mount Lemmon	Mount Lemmon Survey	·	1.1 km	MPC · JPL
529878	2010 SS_{6}	—	March 18, 2004	Socorro	LINEAR	H	490 m	MPC · JPL
529879	2010 SN_{10}	—	September 17, 2010	Catalina	CSS	·	610 m	MPC · JPL
529880	2010 SB_{15}	—	September 29, 2010	Mount Lemmon	Mount Lemmon Survey	H	360 m	MPC · JPL
529881	2010 SV_{25}	—	August 28, 2006	Kitt Peak	Spacewatch	·	930 m	MPC · JPL
529882	2010 SS_{27}	—	September 10, 2010	Mount Lemmon	Mount Lemmon Survey	·	550 m	MPC · JPL
529883	2010 SL_{28}	—	September 14, 2010	Kitt Peak	Spacewatch	·	500 m	MPC · JPL
529884	2010 SZ_{31}	—	September 30, 2010	Mount Lemmon	Mount Lemmon Survey	·	930 m	MPC · JPL
529885	2010 SW_{34}	—	September 30, 2010	Mount Lemmon	Mount Lemmon Survey	·	780 m	MPC · JPL
529886	2010 SX_{34}	—	September 30, 2010	Mount Lemmon	Mount Lemmon Survey	V	820 m	MPC · JPL
529887	2010 SK_{35}	—	September 30, 2010	Mount Lemmon	Mount Lemmon Survey	·	1.3 km	MPC · JPL
529888	2010 SD_{38}	—	February 2, 2008	Mount Lemmon	Mount Lemmon Survey	NYS	1.2 km	MPC · JPL
529889	2010 SY_{44}	—	September 18, 2010	Mount Lemmon	Mount Lemmon Survey	PHO	940 m	MPC · JPL
529890	2010 SE_{45}	—	September 17, 2010	Mount Lemmon	Mount Lemmon Survey	·	780 m	MPC · JPL
529891	2010 SG_{45}	—	September 19, 2010	Kitt Peak	Spacewatch	·	1.5 km	MPC · JPL
529892	2010 TT_{2}	—	March 20, 2002	Kitt Peak	Deep Ecliptic Survey	·	2.0 km	MPC · JPL
529893	2010 TG_{4}	—	January 1, 2008	Kitt Peak	Spacewatch	·	930 m	MPC · JPL
529894	2010 TM_{10}	—	September 15, 2010	Kitt Peak	Spacewatch	·	2.7 km	MPC · JPL
529895	2010 TX_{14}	—	September 19, 2006	Kitt Peak	Spacewatch	MAR	620 m	MPC · JPL
529896	2010 TP_{16}	—	October 3, 2010	Kitt Peak	Spacewatch	EMA	2.5 km	MPC · JPL
529897	2010 TY_{18}	—	July 13, 2010	Kitt Peak	Spacewatch	EUN	1.3 km	MPC · JPL
529898	2010 TD_{24}	—	October 1, 2010	Kitt Peak	Spacewatch	·	830 m	MPC · JPL
529899	2010 TC_{26}	—	August 29, 2006	Kitt Peak	Spacewatch	·	630 m	MPC · JPL
529900	2010 TR_{30}	—	September 17, 2010	Kitt Peak	Spacewatch	·	3.1 km	MPC · JPL

== 529901–530000 ==
back to top

Designation			Discovery			Properties		Ref
Permanent	Provisional	Named after	Date	Site	Discoverer(s)	Category	Diam.	Ref
529901	2010 TT_{31}	—	June 20, 2006	Mount Lemmon	Mount Lemmon Survey	MAS	630 m	MPC · JPL
529902	2010 TK_{38}	—	September 18, 2010	Mount Lemmon	Mount Lemmon Survey	·	1.1 km	MPC · JPL
529903	2010 TD_{42}	—	September 16, 2010	Kitt Peak	Spacewatch	3:2	4.0 km	MPC · JPL
529904	2010 TL_{45}	—	October 3, 2010	Kitt Peak	Spacewatch	MAS	560 m	MPC · JPL
529905	2010 TY_{55}	—	September 26, 2006	Catalina	CSS	·	1.1 km	MPC · JPL
529906	2010 TY_{56}	—	September 8, 2010	Kitt Peak	Spacewatch	·	3.3 km	MPC · JPL
529907	2010 TY_{63}	—	September 8, 2010	Kitt Peak	Spacewatch	·	970 m	MPC · JPL
529908	2010 TL_{65}	—	September 27, 2006	Kitt Peak	Spacewatch	·	510 m	MPC · JPL
529909	2010 TE_{69}	—	March 6, 2008	Kitt Peak	Spacewatch	·	3.0 km	MPC · JPL
529910	2010 TJ_{69}	—	September 25, 2006	Kitt Peak	Spacewatch	·	890 m	MPC · JPL
529911	2010 TC_{81}	—	October 8, 2010	Catalina	CSS	H	620 m	MPC · JPL
529912	2010 TL_{93}	—	October 1, 2010	Kitt Peak	Spacewatch	·	600 m	MPC · JPL
529913	2010 TK_{97}	—	September 16, 2010	Kitt Peak	Spacewatch	·	1.0 km	MPC · JPL
529914	2010 TV_{97}	—	October 20, 2003	Kitt Peak	Spacewatch	·	680 m	MPC · JPL
529915	2010 TZ_{97}	—	September 4, 2010	Kitt Peak	Spacewatch	·	500 m	MPC · JPL
529916	2010 TJ_{99}	—	October 1, 2010	Mount Lemmon	Mount Lemmon Survey	·	2.0 km	MPC · JPL
529917	2010 TA_{107}	—	October 1, 2010	Mount Lemmon	Mount Lemmon Survey	·	2.3 km	MPC · JPL
529918	2010 TM_{109}	—	October 1, 2010	Mount Lemmon	Mount Lemmon Survey	·	1.1 km	MPC · JPL
529919	2010 TY_{109}	—	September 30, 2010	Mount Lemmon	Mount Lemmon Survey	·	2.2 km	MPC · JPL
529920	2010 TL_{117}	—	October 9, 2010	Mount Lemmon	Mount Lemmon Survey	AMO	470 m	MPC · JPL
529921	2010 TN_{119}	—	September 17, 2010	Mount Lemmon	Mount Lemmon Survey	·	630 m	MPC · JPL
529922	2010 TD_{131}	—	October 3, 2010	Catalina	CSS	·	850 m	MPC · JPL
529923	2010 TZ_{144}	—	March 13, 2008	Kitt Peak	Spacewatch	EOS	1.5 km	MPC · JPL
529924	2010 TD_{146}	—	October 19, 2006	Kitt Peak	Spacewatch	(5)	670 m	MPC · JPL
529925	2010 TT_{148}	—	December 31, 2007	Kitt Peak	Spacewatch	·	1.2 km	MPC · JPL
529926	2010 TO_{149}	—	October 12, 2010	Kitt Peak	Spacewatch	BAR	1.3 km	MPC · JPL
529927	2010 TD_{152}	—	September 30, 2010	La Sagra	OAM	MAR	1.0 km	MPC · JPL
529928	2010 TP_{166}	—	October 9, 2010	Catalina	CSS	H	510 m	MPC · JPL
529929	2010 TX_{167}	—	March 22, 2009	Mount Lemmon	Mount Lemmon Survey	·	560 m	MPC · JPL
529930	2010 TB_{171}	—	October 13, 2010	Catalina	CSS	H	510 m	MPC · JPL
529931	2010 TX_{171}	—	November 15, 1995	Kitt Peak	Spacewatch	NYS	750 m	MPC · JPL
529932	2010 TO_{172}	—	November 19, 2007	Mount Lemmon	Mount Lemmon Survey	·	610 m	MPC · JPL
529933	2010 TO_{174}	—	October 11, 2010	Catalina	CSS	·	1.5 km	MPC · JPL
529934	2010 TP_{175}	—	June 11, 2010	WISE	WISE	·	1.0 km	MPC · JPL
529935	2010 TE_{176}	—	September 30, 2006	Catalina	CSS	·	380 m	MPC · JPL
529936	2010 TP_{176}	—	August 19, 2006	Kitt Peak	Spacewatch	·	1.0 km	MPC · JPL
529937	2010 TF_{177}	—	September 29, 2010	Mount Lemmon	Mount Lemmon Survey	·	1.1 km	MPC · JPL
529938	2010 TM_{182}	—	October 6, 2010	Haleakala	Pan-STARRS 1	plutino	192 km	MPC · JPL
529939	2010 TU_{191}	—	October 7, 2010	Haleakala	Pan-STARRS 1	centaur	40 km	MPC · JPL
529940	2010 TB_{192}	—	October 7, 2010	Haleakala	Pan-STARRS 1	SDO	194 km	MPC · JPL
529941	2010 TK_{193}	—	February 13, 2008	Mount Lemmon	Mount Lemmon Survey	·	990 m	MPC · JPL
529942	2010 TL_{193}	—	January 12, 2008	Mount Lemmon	Mount Lemmon Survey	·	1.4 km	MPC · JPL
529943	2010 TM_{193}	—	October 14, 2010	Mount Lemmon	Mount Lemmon Survey	·	1.6 km	MPC · JPL
529944	2010 TS_{194}	—	February 13, 2008	Kitt Peak	Spacewatch	·	980 m	MPC · JPL
529945	2010 TX_{194}	—	October 1, 2010	Kitt Peak	Spacewatch	·	940 m	MPC · JPL
529946	2010 TY_{194}	—	December 16, 2007	Catalina	CSS	·	860 m	MPC · JPL
529947	2010 TZ_{194}	—	October 1, 2010	Mount Lemmon	Mount Lemmon Survey	·	680 m	MPC · JPL
529948	2010 TM_{195}	—	October 15, 2010	Mayhill	L. Elenin	·	3.0 km	MPC · JPL
529949	2010 TN_{195}	—	October 2, 2010	Mount Lemmon	Mount Lemmon Survey	·	870 m	MPC · JPL
529950	2010 TP_{195}	—	October 9, 2010	Catalina	CSS	·	1.3 km	MPC · JPL
529951	2010 UD	—	October 17, 2010	Mount Lemmon	Mount Lemmon Survey	APO · PHA	220 m	MPC · JPL
529952	2010 US_{12}	—	June 13, 2004	Kitt Peak	Spacewatch	H	540 m	MPC · JPL
529953	2010 UG_{17}	—	November 11, 2006	Kitt Peak	Spacewatch	(5)	910 m	MPC · JPL
529954	2010 UJ_{25}	—	October 28, 2010	Kitt Peak	Spacewatch	H	570 m	MPC · JPL
529955	2010 UH_{26}	—	October 28, 2010	Mount Lemmon	Mount Lemmon Survey	·	1.0 km	MPC · JPL
529956	2010 UX_{45}	—	October 17, 2010	Catalina	CSS	H	410 m	MPC · JPL
529957	2010 UB_{52}	—	August 29, 2006	Catalina	CSS	·	1.2 km	MPC · JPL
529958	2010 US_{55}	—	October 29, 2010	Kitt Peak	Spacewatch	·	920 m	MPC · JPL
529959	2010 UP_{56}	—	October 29, 2010	Kitt Peak	Spacewatch	H	440 m	MPC · JPL
529960	2010 UD_{60}	—	November 17, 2006	Kitt Peak	Spacewatch	·	1.3 km	MPC · JPL
529961	2010 UV_{65}	—	October 31, 2010	Mount Lemmon	Mount Lemmon Survey	·	2.9 km	MPC · JPL
529962	2010 UW_{71}	—	October 17, 2010	Mount Lemmon	Mount Lemmon Survey	·	680 m	MPC · JPL
529963	2010 UC_{74}	—	October 30, 2010	Kitt Peak	Spacewatch	·	1.1 km	MPC · JPL
529964	2010 UF_{76}	—	October 30, 2010	Kitt Peak	Spacewatch	·	740 m	MPC · JPL
529965	2010 UY_{76}	—	October 30, 2010	Kitt Peak	Spacewatch	·	3.8 km	MPC · JPL
529966	2010 UF_{77}	—	October 30, 2010	Kitt Peak	Spacewatch	·	870 m	MPC · JPL
529967	2010 UP_{77}	—	October 13, 2010	Mount Lemmon	Mount Lemmon Survey	·	990 m	MPC · JPL
529968	2010 UO_{86}	—	November 15, 1995	Kitt Peak	Spacewatch	·	980 m	MPC · JPL
529969	2010 UF_{92}	—	December 13, 2006	Catalina	CSS	·	1.6 km	MPC · JPL
529970	2010 UD_{96}	—	September 11, 2010	Catalina	CSS	·	1.0 km	MPC · JPL
529971	2010 UJ_{97}	—	October 28, 2010	Mount Lemmon	Mount Lemmon Survey	KON	1.7 km	MPC · JPL
529972	2010 UR_{98}	—	October 13, 2010	Mount Lemmon	Mount Lemmon Survey	T_{j} (2.98) · 3:2	5.1 km	MPC · JPL
529973	2010 UK_{103}	—	September 11, 2010	Mount Lemmon	Mount Lemmon Survey	V	530 m	MPC · JPL
529974	2010 UJ_{107}	—	October 14, 2010	Mount Lemmon	Mount Lemmon Survey	·	1.3 km	MPC · JPL
529975	2010 UN_{107}	—	November 11, 2006	Mount Lemmon	Mount Lemmon Survey	·	730 m	MPC · JPL
529976	2010 UV_{108}	—	April 15, 2008	Mount Lemmon	Mount Lemmon Survey	·	2.9 km	MPC · JPL
529977	2010 UA_{109}	—	October 28, 2010	Mount Lemmon	Mount Lemmon Survey	·	2.1 km	MPC · JPL
529978	2010 UJ_{109}	—	May 5, 2008	Mount Lemmon	Mount Lemmon Survey	·	3.7 km	MPC · JPL
529979	2010 UQ_{110}	—	October 19, 2010	Mount Lemmon	Mount Lemmon Survey	MAS	680 m	MPC · JPL
529980	2010 UR_{110}	—	February 22, 2009	Kitt Peak	Spacewatch	·	690 m	MPC · JPL
529981	2010 VB_{12}	—	April 15, 2008	Mount Lemmon	Mount Lemmon Survey	·	2.4 km	MPC · JPL
529982	2010 VF_{12}	—	September 3, 2010	Mount Lemmon	Mount Lemmon Survey	·	1.0 km	MPC · JPL
529983	2010 VS_{12}	—	April 14, 2004	Kitt Peak	Spacewatch	H	430 m	MPC · JPL
529984	2010 VH_{14}	—	September 16, 2010	Mount Lemmon	Mount Lemmon Survey	·	1.0 km	MPC · JPL
529985	2010 VM_{24}	—	November 1, 2010	Kitt Peak	Spacewatch	·	3.1 km	MPC · JPL
529986	2010 VS_{24}	—	October 12, 2010	Mount Lemmon	Mount Lemmon Survey	·	1.2 km	MPC · JPL
529987	2010 VM_{27}	—	April 17, 2009	Kitt Peak	Spacewatch	H	460 m	MPC · JPL
529988	2010 VO_{33}	—	October 17, 2010	Mount Lemmon	Mount Lemmon Survey	·	1.0 km	MPC · JPL
529989	2010 VB_{34}	—	November 3, 2010	La Sagra	OAM	H	630 m	MPC · JPL
529990	2010 VC_{34}	—	November 20, 2006	Kitt Peak	Spacewatch	·	780 m	MPC · JPL
529991	2010 VB_{42}	—	October 17, 2010	Mount Lemmon	Mount Lemmon Survey	·	2.2 km	MPC · JPL
529992	2010 VY_{45}	—	September 11, 2010	Mount Lemmon	Mount Lemmon Survey	(5)	930 m	MPC · JPL
529993	2010 VH_{46}	—	October 17, 2010	Mount Lemmon	Mount Lemmon Survey	·	550 m	MPC · JPL
529994	2010 VZ_{47}	—	October 14, 2010	Mount Lemmon	Mount Lemmon Survey	ELF	3.7 km	MPC · JPL
529995	2010 VD_{48}	—	October 14, 2010	Mount Lemmon	Mount Lemmon Survey	·	1.4 km	MPC · JPL
529996	2010 VO_{52}	—	October 20, 2006	Kitt Peak	Spacewatch	·	1.0 km	MPC · JPL
529997	2010 VW_{54}	—	October 19, 2010	Mount Lemmon	Mount Lemmon Survey	·	920 m	MPC · JPL
529998	2010 VM_{59}	—	October 13, 2010	Mount Lemmon	Mount Lemmon Survey	·	960 m	MPC · JPL
529999	2010 VJ_{65}	—	November 7, 2010	Kitt Peak	Spacewatch	H	540 m	MPC · JPL
530000	2010 VH_{70}	—	May 16, 2009	Mount Lemmon	Mount Lemmon Survey	H	480 m	MPC · JPL

back to top

== Meaning of names ==
As minor planet discoveries are confirmed, they are given a permanent number by the IAU's Minor Planet Center (MPC), and the discoverers can then submit names for them, following the IAU's naming conventions. The list below concerns those minor planets in the specified number-range that have received names, and explains the meanings of those names.

Official naming citations of newly named small Solar System bodies are approved and published in a bulletin by IAU's Working Group for Small Bodies Nomenclature (WGSBN). Before May 2021, citations were published in MPC's Minor Planet Circulars for many decades. Recent citations can also be found on the JPL Small-Body Database (SBDB). Until his death in 2016, German astronomer Lutz D. Schmadel compiled these citations into the Dictionary of Minor Planet Names (DMP) and regularly updated the collection.

Based on Paul Herget's The Names of the Minor Planets, Schmadel also researched the unclear origin of numerous asteroids, most of which had been named prior to World War II. This article incorporates text from this source, which is in the public domain: SBDB New namings may only be added to this list below after official publication as the preannouncement of names is condemned. The WGSBN publishes a comprehensive guideline for the naming rules of non-cometary small Solar System bodies.

Named minor planet	Provisional	This minor planet was named for...	Ref · Catalog
529729 Xida	2010 LX_{44}	Northwest University of China, known for its geology, archaeology and Chinese cultural studies.	IAU · 529729
529828 Jinhuayizhong	2010 RJ_{22}	Jinhuayizhong (Jinhua No.1 High School), located in Zhejiang Province, was founded in 1902. It has educated about 46 000 students, including 19 academicians of China, and cultivated many astronomy enthusiasts, aerospace experts and space scientists, who have made great contributions to astronomy and space science.	IAU · 529828
