= List of minor planets: 480001–481000 =

The following is a partial list of minor planets, running from minor-planet number 480001 through 481000, inclusive. The primary data for this and other partial lists is based on JPL's "Small-Body Orbital Elements" and data available from the Minor Planet Center. Critical list information is also provided by the MPC, unless otherwise specified from Lowell Observatory. A detailed description of the table's columns and additional sources are given on the main page including a complete list of every page in this series, and a statistical break-up on the dynamical classification of minor planets.

Also see the summary list of all named bodies in numerical and alphabetical order, and the corresponding naming citations for the number range of this particular list. New namings may only be added to this list after official publication, as the preannouncement of names is condemned by the Working Group for Small Bodies Nomenclature of the International Astronomical Union.

Near-Earth obj.	MBA (inner)	MBA (outer)	Centaur
Mars-crosser	MBA (middle)	Jupiter trojan	Trans-Neptunian obj.
Unclassified

== 480001–480100 ==
Designation			Discovery			Properties		Ref
Permanent	Provisional	Named after	Date	Site	Discoverer(s)	Category	Diam.	Ref
480001	2014 KW_{77}	—	December 13, 2006	Mount Lemmon	Mount Lemmon Survey	·	3.0 km	MPC · JPL
480002	2014 KS_{82}	—	March 14, 2008	Catalina	CSS	·	3.5 km	MPC · JPL
480003	2014 KY_{85}	—	June 19, 2009	Kitt Peak	Spacewatch	·	3.4 km	MPC · JPL
480004	2014 KD_{91}	—	April 15, 2010	Mount Lemmon	Mount Lemmon Survey	AMO +1km	1.3 km	MPC · JPL
480005	2014 KN_{98}	—	November 14, 2007	Mount Lemmon	Mount Lemmon Survey	·	2.7 km	MPC · JPL
480006	2014 LZ_{7}	—	December 25, 2011	Kitt Peak	Spacewatch	EOS	1.7 km	MPC · JPL
480007	2014 LP_{11}	—	April 6, 2008	Kitt Peak	Spacewatch	VER	2.3 km	MPC · JPL
480008	2014 LM_{26}	—	November 6, 2005	Kitt Peak	Spacewatch	PHO	1.1 km	MPC · JPL
480009	2014 MC_{10}	—	October 1, 2005	Mount Lemmon	Mount Lemmon Survey	·	3.0 km	MPC · JPL
480010	2014 MX_{28}	—	May 21, 2010	WISE	WISE	·	5.6 km	MPC · JPL
480011	2014 MV_{59}	—	September 27, 2005	Kitt Peak	Spacewatch	·	2.2 km	MPC · JPL
480012	2014 NP_{3}	—	March 9, 2005	Catalina	CSS	·	1.5 km	MPC · JPL
480013	2014 OB_{51}	—	February 25, 2007	Kitt Peak	Spacewatch	·	2.8 km	MPC · JPL
480014	2014 OF_{235}	—	March 31, 2009	Catalina	CSS	·	2.6 km	MPC · JPL
480015	2014 OV_{238}	—	January 17, 2007	Mount Lemmon	Mount Lemmon Survey	·	1.8 km	MPC · JPL
480016	2014 OR_{367}	—	January 4, 2012	Mount Lemmon	Mount Lemmon Survey	·	3.3 km	MPC · JPL
480017	2014 QB_{442}	—	August 25, 2014	Haleakala	Pan-STARRS 1	SDO	188 km	MPC · JPL
480018	2014 XK_{37}	—	February 19, 2010	Siding Spring	SSS	H	700 m	MPC · JPL
480019	2014 YV_{14}	—	March 13, 2005	Anderson Mesa	LONEOS	H	480 m	MPC · JPL
480020	2014 YQ_{21}	—	January 24, 2007	Socorro	LINEAR	H	460 m	MPC · JPL
480021	2014 YX_{30}	—	January 18, 2005	Kitt Peak	Spacewatch	PHO	1.2 km	MPC · JPL
480022	2014 YP_{49}	—	December 11, 2006	Kitt Peak	Spacewatch	H	640 m	MPC · JPL
480023	2015 AA_{17}	—	September 6, 2008	Mount Lemmon	Mount Lemmon Survey	H	480 m	MPC · JPL
480024	2015 AU_{120}	—	December 15, 2014	Kitt Peak	Spacewatch	H	550 m	MPC · JPL
480025	2015 AR_{264}	—	February 16, 2010	Kitt Peak	Spacewatch	H	400 m	MPC · JPL
480026	2015 AD_{280}	—	January 27, 2006	Mount Lemmon	Mount Lemmon Survey	·	1.4 km	MPC · JPL
480027	2015 BL_{2}	—	August 20, 2008	Kitt Peak	Spacewatch	H	390 m	MPC · JPL
480028	2015 BX_{4}	—	November 14, 2006	Mount Lemmon	Mount Lemmon Survey	H	760 m	MPC · JPL
480029	2015 BT_{20}	—	December 28, 2011	Mount Lemmon	Mount Lemmon Survey	H	470 m	MPC · JPL
480030	2015 BQ_{36}	—	December 25, 2005	Kitt Peak	Spacewatch	EUN	1.2 km	MPC · JPL
480031	2015 BZ_{87}	—	November 14, 2010	Mount Lemmon	Mount Lemmon Survey	·	790 m	MPC · JPL
480032	2015 BG_{91}	—	January 8, 2011	Mount Lemmon	Mount Lemmon Survey	·	1.3 km	MPC · JPL
480033	2015 BY_{106}	—	December 29, 2008	Kitt Peak	Spacewatch	·	970 m	MPC · JPL
480034	2015 BB_{119}	—	December 19, 2004	Mount Lemmon	Mount Lemmon Survey	·	640 m	MPC · JPL
480035	2015 BG_{143}	—	April 4, 2008	Kitt Peak	Spacewatch	·	960 m	MPC · JPL
480036	2015 BT_{156}	—	January 27, 2010	WISE	WISE	·	2.5 km	MPC · JPL
480037	2015 BU_{192}	—	January 1, 2008	Kitt Peak	Spacewatch	·	770 m	MPC · JPL
480038	2015 BK_{198}	—	March 13, 2012	Mount Lemmon	Mount Lemmon Survey	·	570 m	MPC · JPL
480039	2015 BK_{266}	—	September 16, 2009	Mount Lemmon	Mount Lemmon Survey	·	1.2 km	MPC · JPL
480040	2015 BJ_{298}	—	January 13, 2011	Kitt Peak	Spacewatch	MAS	700 m	MPC · JPL
480041	2015 BQ_{302}	—	November 27, 2006	Kitt Peak	Spacewatch	V	760 m	MPC · JPL
480042	2015 BE_{425}	—	March 17, 2012	Mount Lemmon	Mount Lemmon Survey	·	480 m	MPC · JPL
480043	2015 BQ_{425}	—	August 31, 2005	Kitt Peak	Spacewatch	·	1.1 km	MPC · JPL
480044	2015 BK_{437}	—	October 31, 2005	Mount Lemmon	Mount Lemmon Survey	NYS	1.2 km	MPC · JPL
480045	2015 BF_{444}	—	August 19, 2006	Kitt Peak	Spacewatch	·	720 m	MPC · JPL
480046	2015 BX_{512}	—	April 25, 2007	Kitt Peak	Spacewatch	H	370 m	MPC · JPL
480047	2015 BO_{514}	—	March 8, 2005	Socorro	LINEAR	H	450 m	MPC · JPL
480048	2015 CN_{1}	—	March 29, 2012	Kitt Peak	Spacewatch	·	750 m	MPC · JPL
480049	2015 CH_{9}	—	March 26, 2008	Mount Lemmon	Mount Lemmon Survey	·	860 m	MPC · JPL
480050	2015 CY_{21}	—	February 9, 2008	Kitt Peak	Spacewatch	·	690 m	MPC · JPL
480051	2015 CV_{33}	—	July 30, 2008	Kitt Peak	Spacewatch	H	360 m	MPC · JPL
480052	2015 CV_{39}	—	April 30, 2010	WISE	WISE	·	1.7 km	MPC · JPL
480053	2015 CA_{46}	—	September 18, 2003	Kitt Peak	Spacewatch	·	730 m	MPC · JPL
480054	2015 CL_{46}	—	April 29, 2012	Kitt Peak	Spacewatch	·	640 m	MPC · JPL
480055	2015 CQ_{46}	—	January 31, 2006	Kitt Peak	Spacewatch	·	1.7 km	MPC · JPL
480056	2015 CW_{51}	—	August 29, 2005	Kitt Peak	Spacewatch	H	460 m	MPC · JPL
480057	2015 CX_{54}	—	March 28, 2011	Kitt Peak	Spacewatch	·	1.6 km	MPC · JPL
480058	2015 CN_{57}	—	April 2, 2005	Catalina	CSS	H	540 m	MPC · JPL
480059	2015 DV_{32}	—	September 15, 2006	Kitt Peak	Spacewatch	·	700 m	MPC · JPL
480060	2015 DV_{64}	—	March 13, 2012	Mount Lemmon	Mount Lemmon Survey	·	850 m	MPC · JPL
480061	2015 DZ_{75}	—	August 18, 2006	Kitt Peak	Spacewatch	·	620 m	MPC · JPL
480062	2015 DH_{77}	—	March 15, 2012	Kitt Peak	Spacewatch	·	530 m	MPC · JPL
480063	2015 DF_{93}	—	May 13, 2004	Kitt Peak	Spacewatch	·	810 m	MPC · JPL
480064	2015 DN_{96}	—	February 28, 2008	Mount Lemmon	Mount Lemmon Survey	·	600 m	MPC · JPL
480065	2015 DC_{98}	—	April 6, 2008	Kitt Peak	Spacewatch	·	1.2 km	MPC · JPL
480066	2015 DR_{98}	—	February 26, 2011	Mount Lemmon	Mount Lemmon Survey	·	1.0 km	MPC · JPL
480067	2015 DM_{101}	—	March 3, 1997	Kitt Peak	Spacewatch	H	340 m	MPC · JPL
480068	2015 DU_{116}	—	March 22, 2012	Mount Lemmon	Mount Lemmon Survey	·	500 m	MPC · JPL
480069	2015 DZ_{135}	—	December 20, 2009	Kitt Peak	Spacewatch	EUN	1.2 km	MPC · JPL
480070	2015 DO_{138}	—	April 7, 2006	Anderson Mesa	LONEOS	·	3.0 km	MPC · JPL
480071	2015 DC_{153}	—	January 10, 2007	Kitt Peak	Spacewatch	·	1 km	MPC · JPL
480072	2015 DX_{153}	—	February 1, 2012	Catalina	CSS	H	620 m	MPC · JPL
480073	2015 DS_{180}	—	July 3, 2005	Mount Lemmon	Mount Lemmon Survey	H	430 m	MPC · JPL
480074	2015 DZ_{196}	—	January 9, 2011	Mount Lemmon	Mount Lemmon Survey	·	1.2 km	MPC · JPL
480075	2015 DE_{199}	—	September 25, 2005	Kitt Peak	Spacewatch	H	450 m	MPC · JPL
480076	2015 DR_{199}	—	October 21, 2003	Kitt Peak	Spacewatch	H	530 m	MPC · JPL
480077	2015 DO_{205}	—	October 29, 2005	Mount Lemmon	Mount Lemmon Survey	NYS	1.1 km	MPC · JPL
480078	2015 DQ_{205}	—	November 24, 2003	Kitt Peak	Spacewatch	·	760 m	MPC · JPL
480079	2015 DF_{206}	—	February 25, 2007	Mount Lemmon	Mount Lemmon Survey	·	1.3 km	MPC · JPL
480080	2015 DN_{206}	—	April 19, 2004	Socorro	LINEAR	·	1.6 km	MPC · JPL
480081	2015 DF_{210}	—	December 31, 2007	Kitt Peak	Spacewatch	·	3.6 km	MPC · JPL
480082	2015 DP_{210}	—	May 25, 2006	Mount Lemmon	Mount Lemmon Survey	·	2.0 km	MPC · JPL
480083	2015 DE_{213}	—	March 21, 2010	Mount Lemmon	Mount Lemmon Survey	·	2.2 km	MPC · JPL
480084	2015 DO_{214}	—	January 7, 2010	Kitt Peak	Spacewatch	·	1.4 km	MPC · JPL
480085	2015 DR_{214}	—	November 20, 2006	Kitt Peak	Spacewatch	·	880 m	MPC · JPL
480086	2015 DT_{214}	—	October 17, 2011	Kitt Peak	Spacewatch	H	400 m	MPC · JPL
480087	2015 DB_{220}	—	December 7, 1996	Kitt Peak	Spacewatch	·	890 m	MPC · JPL
480088	2015 DT_{221}	—	January 13, 2011	Mount Lemmon	Mount Lemmon Survey	·	1.0 km	MPC · JPL
480089	2015 EG_{9}	—	April 20, 2004	Socorro	LINEAR	·	1.6 km	MPC · JPL
480090	2015 EM_{10}	—	February 8, 2011	Mount Lemmon	Mount Lemmon Survey	JUN	990 m	MPC · JPL
480091	2015 EE_{14}	—	March 27, 2003	Kitt Peak	Spacewatch	·	890 m	MPC · JPL
480092	2015 EV_{41}	—	February 9, 2005	Kitt Peak	Spacewatch	H	330 m	MPC · JPL
480093	2015 EF_{46}	—	March 17, 2004	Kitt Peak	Spacewatch	MAS	640 m	MPC · JPL
480094	2015 EZ_{51}	—	February 9, 2007	Kitt Peak	Spacewatch	H	480 m	MPC · JPL
480095	2015 EA_{63}	—	September 11, 2007	Mount Lemmon	Mount Lemmon Survey	·	1.9 km	MPC · JPL
480096	2015 EJ_{63}	—	March 1, 2008	Kitt Peak	Spacewatch	·	850 m	MPC · JPL
480097	2015 EC_{64}	—	April 23, 2006	Anderson Mesa	LONEOS	·	2.4 km	MPC · JPL
480098	2015 EF_{64}	—	March 23, 2004	Socorro	LINEAR	·	1.1 km	MPC · JPL
480099	2015 FA_{11}	—	August 10, 2012	Kitt Peak	Spacewatch	·	1.8 km	MPC · JPL
480100	2015 FF_{33}	—	September 23, 2008	Mount Lemmon	Mount Lemmon Survey	H	530 m	MPC · JPL

== 480101–480200 ==
back to top

Designation			Discovery			Properties		Ref
Permanent	Provisional	Named after	Date	Site	Discoverer(s)	Category	Diam.	Ref
480101	2015 FU_{36}	—	January 14, 2012	Kitt Peak	Spacewatch	H	430 m	MPC · JPL
480102	2015 FC_{39}	—	April 11, 2005	Mount Lemmon	Mount Lemmon Survey	·	690 m	MPC · JPL
480103	2015 FK_{42}	—	April 22, 2010	WISE	WISE	·	2.6 km	MPC · JPL
480104	2015 FP_{42}	—	September 26, 2006	Mount Lemmon	Mount Lemmon Survey	V	680 m	MPC · JPL
480105	2015 FJ_{43}	—	September 14, 2005	Kitt Peak	Spacewatch	V	700 m	MPC · JPL
480106	2015 FX_{43}	—	October 10, 2005	Kitt Peak	Spacewatch	·	2.7 km	MPC · JPL
480107	2015 FP_{45}	—	March 12, 2008	Mount Lemmon	Mount Lemmon Survey	·	750 m	MPC · JPL
480108	2015 FS_{45}	—	April 18, 2010	WISE	WISE	LIX	2.5 km	MPC · JPL
480109	2015 FT_{69}	—	June 27, 2001	Anderson Mesa	LONEOS	·	2.7 km	MPC · JPL
480110	2015 FX_{69}	—	November 30, 2005	Mount Lemmon	Mount Lemmon Survey	MAR	1.4 km	MPC · JPL
480111	2015 FW_{71}	—	March 26, 2004	Kitt Peak	Spacewatch	·	2.1 km	MPC · JPL
480112	2015 FF_{73}	—	May 8, 2006	Mount Lemmon	Mount Lemmon Survey	·	1.7 km	MPC · JPL
480113	2015 FY_{73}	—	March 29, 2011	Mount Lemmon	Mount Lemmon Survey	·	1.1 km	MPC · JPL
480114	2015 FJ_{75}	—	October 1, 2005	Mount Lemmon	Mount Lemmon Survey	THB	2.2 km	MPC · JPL
480115	2015 FN_{76}	—	April 29, 2011	Mount Lemmon	Mount Lemmon Survey	EUN	920 m	MPC · JPL
480116	2015 FR_{81}	—	January 12, 2011	Kitt Peak	Spacewatch	PHO	730 m	MPC · JPL
480117	2015 FH_{85}	—	April 14, 2008	Catalina	CSS	·	1.1 km	MPC · JPL
480118	2015 FG_{90}	—	July 3, 1995	Kitt Peak	Spacewatch	·	750 m	MPC · JPL
480119	2015 FY_{90}	—	April 10, 2005	Mount Lemmon	Mount Lemmon Survey	·	690 m	MPC · JPL
480120	2015 FX_{98}	—	June 15, 2012	Mount Lemmon	Mount Lemmon Survey	·	1.1 km	MPC · JPL
480121	2015 FJ_{103}	—	January 11, 2011	Mount Lemmon	Mount Lemmon Survey	V	550 m	MPC · JPL
480122	2015 FQ_{107}	—	September 16, 2009	Kitt Peak	Spacewatch	·	1.5 km	MPC · JPL
480123	2015 FW_{107}	—	October 31, 2010	Kitt Peak	Spacewatch	·	690 m	MPC · JPL
480124	2015 FL_{109}	—	September 19, 2009	Mount Lemmon	Mount Lemmon Survey	V	730 m	MPC · JPL
480125	2015 FW_{114}	—	February 9, 2005	Kitt Peak	Spacewatch	·	770 m	MPC · JPL
480126	2015 FP_{123}	—	March 12, 2008	Mount Lemmon	Mount Lemmon Survey	·	830 m	MPC · JPL
480127	2015 FQ_{138}	—	March 10, 2005	Kitt Peak	Spacewatch	·	750 m	MPC · JPL
480128	2015 FA_{142}	—	February 14, 2010	WISE	WISE	·	2.6 km	MPC · JPL
480129	2015 FR_{143}	—	October 4, 1994	Kitt Peak	Spacewatch	·	1.9 km	MPC · JPL
480130	2015 FD_{144}	—	September 23, 2008	Mount Lemmon	Mount Lemmon Survey	·	1.1 km	MPC · JPL
480131	2015 FQ_{147}	—	October 27, 2005	Kitt Peak	Spacewatch	·	1.1 km	MPC · JPL
480132	2015 FY_{150}	—	August 29, 2000	Socorro	LINEAR	·	1.1 km	MPC · JPL
480133	2015 FL_{152}	—	March 9, 2011	Mount Lemmon	Mount Lemmon Survey	·	1.0 km	MPC · JPL
480134	2015 FN_{152}	—	March 16, 2004	Kitt Peak	Spacewatch	NYS	960 m	MPC · JPL
480135	2015 FR_{153}	—	March 13, 2011	Kitt Peak	Spacewatch	·	1.3 km	MPC · JPL
480136	2015 FS_{156}	—	October 31, 2008	Kitt Peak	Spacewatch	·	1.8 km	MPC · JPL
480137	2015 FW_{156}	—	November 25, 2005	Kitt Peak	Spacewatch	·	1.2 km	MPC · JPL
480138	2015 FF_{158}	—	December 22, 2005	Kitt Peak	Spacewatch	·	1.4 km	MPC · JPL
480139	2015 FE_{162}	—	September 14, 2007	Kitt Peak	Spacewatch	·	1.7 km	MPC · JPL
480140	2015 FX_{166}	—	March 11, 2005	Kitt Peak	Spacewatch	·	620 m	MPC · JPL
480141	2015 FP_{168}	—	January 19, 2008	Mount Lemmon	Mount Lemmon Survey	·	650 m	MPC · JPL
480142	2015 FD_{170}	—	March 2, 2006	Mount Lemmon	Mount Lemmon Survey	ADE	1.7 km	MPC · JPL
480143	2015 FJ_{174}	—	May 16, 2010	Mount Lemmon	Mount Lemmon Survey	·	2.4 km	MPC · JPL
480144	2015 FP_{176}	—	November 2, 2010	Mount Lemmon	Mount Lemmon Survey	·	630 m	MPC · JPL
480145	2015 FA_{180}	—	September 28, 1997	Kitt Peak	Spacewatch	·	760 m	MPC · JPL
480146	2015 FL_{195}	—	December 25, 2005	Mount Lemmon	Mount Lemmon Survey	·	1.4 km	MPC · JPL
480147	2015 FZ_{215}	—	October 1, 2005	Kitt Peak	Spacewatch	V	650 m	MPC · JPL
480148	2015 FD_{236}	—	June 14, 2012	Kitt Peak	Spacewatch	·	650 m	MPC · JPL
480149	2015 FK_{246}	—	February 1, 2005	Kitt Peak	Spacewatch	615	1.5 km	MPC · JPL
480150	2015 FR_{249}	—	March 14, 2011	Mount Lemmon	Mount Lemmon Survey	·	1.4 km	MPC · JPL
480151	2015 FQ_{266}	—	February 28, 2008	Mount Lemmon	Mount Lemmon Survey	·	640 m	MPC · JPL
480152	2015 FO_{284}	—	May 11, 2010	Mount Lemmon	Mount Lemmon Survey	·	1.9 km	MPC · JPL
480153	2015 FS_{284}	—	November 24, 2009	Kitt Peak	Spacewatch	·	1.1 km	MPC · JPL
480154	2015 FP_{285}	—	September 25, 2005	Catalina	CSS	H	620 m	MPC · JPL
480155	2015 FB_{286}	—	June 6, 2011	Kitt Peak	Spacewatch	EUN	1.4 km	MPC · JPL
480156	2015 FV_{289}	—	September 23, 2008	Kitt Peak	Spacewatch	·	1.3 km	MPC · JPL
480157	2015 FG_{290}	—	October 6, 2008	Mount Lemmon	Mount Lemmon Survey	·	1.9 km	MPC · JPL
480158	2015 FO_{292}	—	October 20, 2006	Kitt Peak	Spacewatch	·	760 m	MPC · JPL
480159	2015 FD_{293}	—	September 19, 2006	Kitt Peak	Spacewatch	·	780 m	MPC · JPL
480160	2015 FE_{293}	—	January 10, 2008	Kitt Peak	Spacewatch	·	780 m	MPC · JPL
480161	2015 FK_{295}	—	October 18, 2009	Catalina	CSS	·	810 m	MPC · JPL
480162	2015 FZ_{297}	—	February 23, 2011	Catalina	CSS	·	1.1 km	MPC · JPL
480163	2015 FT_{298}	—	September 24, 2008	Kitt Peak	Spacewatch	·	1.5 km	MPC · JPL
480164	2015 FK_{300}	—	March 29, 2010	WISE	WISE	·	2.7 km	MPC · JPL
480165	2015 FM_{300}	—	December 3, 2008	Mount Lemmon	Mount Lemmon Survey	·	2.2 km	MPC · JPL
480166	2015 FY_{300}	—	September 21, 2011	Mount Lemmon	Mount Lemmon Survey	·	2.8 km	MPC · JPL
480167	2015 FP_{302}	—	March 27, 2008	Mount Lemmon	Mount Lemmon Survey	·	740 m	MPC · JPL
480168	2015 FY_{302}	—	March 24, 2009	Mount Lemmon	Mount Lemmon Survey	·	3.0 km	MPC · JPL
480169	2015 FY_{303}	—	February 15, 2010	Kitt Peak	Spacewatch	·	1.4 km	MPC · JPL
480170	2015 FE_{304}	—	January 26, 2006	Kitt Peak	Spacewatch	·	1.7 km	MPC · JPL
480171	2015 FJ_{304}	—	May 24, 2011	Mount Lemmon	Mount Lemmon Survey	·	1.3 km	MPC · JPL
480172	2015 FT_{308}	—	January 25, 2006	Kitt Peak	Spacewatch	·	1.5 km	MPC · JPL
480173	2015 FZ_{310}	—	October 1, 2009	Mount Lemmon	Mount Lemmon Survey	·	900 m	MPC · JPL
480174	2015 FU_{314}	—	December 7, 2013	Mount Lemmon	Mount Lemmon Survey	·	800 m	MPC · JPL
480175	2015 FE_{317}	—	January 11, 2011	Mount Lemmon	Mount Lemmon Survey	·	1.4 km	MPC · JPL
480176	2015 FK_{317}	—	May 27, 2008	Mount Lemmon	Mount Lemmon Survey	·	890 m	MPC · JPL
480177	2015 FW_{317}	—	October 29, 2010	Kitt Peak	Spacewatch	·	620 m	MPC · JPL
480178	2015 FE_{318}	—	January 24, 2007	Mount Lemmon	Mount Lemmon Survey	·	1.1 km	MPC · JPL
480179	2015 FD_{319}	—	November 17, 2009	Mount Lemmon	Mount Lemmon Survey	·	1.4 km	MPC · JPL
480180	2015 FW_{322}	—	October 15, 2007	Mount Lemmon	Mount Lemmon Survey	·	1.8 km	MPC · JPL
480181	2015 FN_{323}	—	April 8, 2010	WISE	WISE	·	1.5 km	MPC · JPL
480182	2015 FC_{331}	—	March 9, 1997	Kitt Peak	Spacewatch	·	850 m	MPC · JPL
480183	2015 FY_{331}	—	April 8, 2008	Kitt Peak	Spacewatch	·	800 m	MPC · JPL
480184	2015 FG_{332}	—	July 5, 2010	Mount Lemmon	Mount Lemmon Survey	H	570 m	MPC · JPL
480185	2015 FT_{332}	—	May 14, 2010	Mount Lemmon	Mount Lemmon Survey	H	590 m	MPC · JPL
480186	2015 FY_{332}	—	September 12, 2007	Mount Lemmon	Mount Lemmon Survey	·	2.3 km	MPC · JPL
480187	2015 FV_{333}	—	April 19, 2006	Mount Lemmon	Mount Lemmon Survey	·	1.6 km	MPC · JPL
480188	2015 FZ_{333}	—	April 13, 2010	WISE	WISE	·	2.2 km	MPC · JPL
480189	2015 FP_{336}	—	February 23, 2010	WISE	WISE	·	1.9 km	MPC · JPL
480190	2015 FF_{337}	—	May 23, 2011	Mount Lemmon	Mount Lemmon Survey	·	1.6 km	MPC · JPL
480191	2015 FR_{337}	—	January 28, 2006	Catalina	CSS	EUN	1.6 km	MPC · JPL
480192	2015 FS_{337}	—	November 8, 2007	Mount Lemmon	Mount Lemmon Survey	·	2.4 km	MPC · JPL
480193	2015 FA_{339}	—	December 25, 2013	Mount Lemmon	Mount Lemmon Survey	·	1.8 km	MPC · JPL
480194	2015 FG_{339}	—	September 30, 2005	Mauna Kea	A. Boattini	·	1.4 km	MPC · JPL
480195	2015 FZ_{339}	—	August 14, 2010	WISE	WISE	T_{j} (2.91) · CYB	3.6 km	MPC · JPL
480196	2015 FC_{340}	—	January 26, 2001	Kitt Peak	Spacewatch	·	2.3 km	MPC · JPL
480197	2015 FH_{340}	—	October 26, 2008	Kitt Peak	Spacewatch	·	1.7 km	MPC · JPL
480198	2015 FE_{342}	—	October 2, 2006	Mount Lemmon	Mount Lemmon Survey	·	3.0 km	MPC · JPL
480199	2015 FB_{343}	—	March 25, 2010	WISE	WISE	·	3.9 km	MPC · JPL
480200	2015 FR_{344}	—	April 5, 2011	Siding Spring	SSS	·	2.0 km	MPC · JPL

== 480201–480300 ==
back to top

Designation			Discovery			Properties		Ref
Permanent	Provisional	Named after	Date	Site	Discoverer(s)	Category	Diam.	Ref
480201	2015 FY_{345}	—	March 1, 2005	Kitt Peak	Spacewatch	PHO	830 m	MPC · JPL
480202	2015 FP_{353}	—	March 10, 2007	Mount Lemmon	Mount Lemmon Survey	·	1.3 km	MPC · JPL
480203	2015 FL_{363}	—	January 11, 2008	Mount Lemmon	Mount Lemmon Survey	·	600 m	MPC · JPL
480204	2015 FY_{363}	—	March 11, 2005	Mount Lemmon	Mount Lemmon Survey	·	850 m	MPC · JPL
480205	2015 FF_{373}	—	May 24, 2006	Mount Lemmon	Mount Lemmon Survey	·	2.4 km	MPC · JPL
480206	2015 GP	—	February 25, 2007	Catalina	CSS	H	530 m	MPC · JPL
480207	2015 GW_{3}	—	May 12, 2012	Mount Lemmon	Mount Lemmon Survey	·	760 m	MPC · JPL
480208	2015 GM_{5}	—	May 6, 2008	Mount Lemmon	Mount Lemmon Survey	·	1.0 km	MPC · JPL
480209	2015 GG_{6}	—	March 20, 2004	Socorro	LINEAR	·	2.6 km	MPC · JPL
480210	2015 GU_{12}	—	February 10, 2007	Catalina	CSS	H	530 m	MPC · JPL
480211	2015 GP_{18}	—	November 20, 2003	Kitt Peak	Spacewatch	·	620 m	MPC · JPL
480212	2015 GW_{19}	—	October 22, 2005	Kitt Peak	Spacewatch	MAS	700 m	MPC · JPL
480213	2015 GB_{22}	—	March 24, 2006	Mount Lemmon	Mount Lemmon Survey	·	1.6 km	MPC · JPL
480214	2015 GP_{23}	—	June 23, 2011	Kitt Peak	Spacewatch	·	1.4 km	MPC · JPL
480215	2015 GL_{26}	—	May 13, 2010	Mount Lemmon	Mount Lemmon Survey	·	1.9 km	MPC · JPL
480216	2015 GS_{28}	—	August 29, 2005	Kitt Peak	Spacewatch	·	760 m	MPC · JPL
480217	2015 GW_{28}	—	February 17, 2004	Kitt Peak	Spacewatch	NYS	950 m	MPC · JPL
480218	2015 GU_{29}	—	April 19, 2004	Kitt Peak	Spacewatch	·	1.0 km	MPC · JPL
480219	2015 GO_{31}	—	September 26, 2008	Mount Lemmon	Mount Lemmon Survey	H	500 m	MPC · JPL
480220	2015 GR_{31}	—	October 7, 2008	Kitt Peak	Spacewatch	MAR	940 m	MPC · JPL
480221	2015 GH_{32}	—	May 20, 2005	Mount Lemmon	Mount Lemmon Survey	·	2.2 km	MPC · JPL
480222	2015 GX_{33}	—	December 11, 2012	Mount Lemmon	Mount Lemmon Survey	JUN	1 km	MPC · JPL
480223	2015 GC_{34}	—	February 10, 2008	Kitt Peak	Spacewatch	·	690 m	MPC · JPL
480224	2015 GS_{34}	—	May 16, 2005	Mount Lemmon	Mount Lemmon Survey	·	770 m	MPC · JPL
480225	2015 GO_{36}	—	March 9, 2005	Mount Lemmon	Mount Lemmon Survey	·	2.7 km	MPC · JPL
480226	2015 GP_{41}	—	January 10, 2008	Kitt Peak	Spacewatch	·	730 m	MPC · JPL
480227	2015 GU_{42}	—	December 14, 2010	Mount Lemmon	Mount Lemmon Survey	·	620 m	MPC · JPL
480228	2015 GS_{43}	—	April 6, 2011	Mount Lemmon	Mount Lemmon Survey	·	1.2 km	MPC · JPL
480229	2015 GP_{47}	—	April 4, 2005	Mount Lemmon	Mount Lemmon Survey	·	700 m	MPC · JPL
480230	2015 HN	—	December 11, 2004	Kitt Peak	Spacewatch	·	2.1 km	MPC · JPL
480231	2015 HQ_{2}	—	April 5, 2008	Mount Lemmon	Mount Lemmon Survey	·	870 m	MPC · JPL
480232	2015 HC_{4}	—	October 6, 1999	Socorro	LINEAR	·	1.3 km	MPC · JPL
480233	2015 HA_{5}	—	January 10, 2007	Mount Lemmon	Mount Lemmon Survey	·	1.3 km	MPC · JPL
480234	2015 HO_{6}	—	October 20, 2006	Kitt Peak	Spacewatch	·	610 m	MPC · JPL
480235	2015 HH_{7}	—	February 9, 2010	Mount Lemmon	Mount Lemmon Survey	·	3.2 km	MPC · JPL
480236	2015 HR_{8}	—	April 8, 2003	Kitt Peak	Spacewatch	·	1 km	MPC · JPL
480237	2015 HD_{15}	—	September 28, 2003	Kitt Peak	Spacewatch	·	760 m	MPC · JPL
480238	2015 HK_{15}	—	December 31, 2013	Mount Lemmon	Mount Lemmon Survey	·	1.3 km	MPC · JPL
480239	2015 HG_{19}	—	March 28, 2004	Kitt Peak	Deep Lens Survey	·	1.4 km	MPC · JPL
480240	2015 HT_{22}	—	October 18, 2009	Mount Lemmon	Mount Lemmon Survey	PHO	780 m	MPC · JPL
480241	2015 HS_{26}	—	January 2, 2009	Kitt Peak	Spacewatch	KOR	1.3 km	MPC · JPL
480242	2015 HN_{27}	—	October 23, 2009	Kitt Peak	Spacewatch	·	1.4 km	MPC · JPL
480243	2015 HA_{29}	—	October 15, 2009	La Sagra	OAM	(2076)	1.0 km	MPC · JPL
480244	2015 HG_{30}	—	November 1, 1999	Kitt Peak	Spacewatch	·	790 m	MPC · JPL
480245	2015 HT_{33}	—	May 21, 2011	Mount Lemmon	Mount Lemmon Survey	·	1.1 km	MPC · JPL
480246	2015 HD_{35}	—	February 19, 2009	Kitt Peak	Spacewatch	·	2.3 km	MPC · JPL
480247	2015 HZ_{36}	—	May 28, 2008	Mount Lemmon	Mount Lemmon Survey	V	540 m	MPC · JPL
480248	2015 HB_{39}	—	March 7, 2014	Mount Lemmon	Mount Lemmon Survey	·	2.7 km	MPC · JPL
480249	2015 HL_{40}	—	April 13, 2011	Mount Lemmon	Mount Lemmon Survey	·	1.3 km	MPC · JPL
480250	2015 HT_{40}	—	February 17, 2007	Mount Lemmon	Mount Lemmon Survey	·	1.3 km	MPC · JPL
480251	2015 HA_{56}	—	November 3, 2005	Mount Lemmon	Mount Lemmon Survey	·	1.1 km	MPC · JPL
480252	2015 HS_{56}	—	March 11, 2005	Kitt Peak	Spacewatch	BRA	1.6 km	MPC · JPL
480253	2015 HW_{57}	—	September 21, 2003	Kitt Peak	Spacewatch	·	820 m	MPC · JPL
480254	2015 HT_{60}	—	June 10, 2004	Campo Imperatore	CINEOS	·	3.2 km	MPC · JPL
480255	2015 HZ_{60}	—	April 2, 2009	Mount Lemmon	Mount Lemmon Survey	·	2.4 km	MPC · JPL
480256	2015 HB_{61}	—	May 1, 2009	Mount Lemmon	Mount Lemmon Survey	THB	2.7 km	MPC · JPL
480257	2015 HP_{61}	—	August 14, 2007	Siding Spring	SSS	·	1.2 km	MPC · JPL
480258	2015 HL_{62}	—	March 29, 2004	Kitt Peak	Spacewatch	·	960 m	MPC · JPL
480259	2015 HW_{62}	—	December 20, 2009	Mount Lemmon	Mount Lemmon Survey	PHO	990 m	MPC · JPL
480260	2015 HR_{64}	—	May 11, 2010	Mount Lemmon	Mount Lemmon Survey	EOS	1.5 km	MPC · JPL
480261	2015 HA_{71}	—	December 9, 2001	Socorro	LINEAR	·	1.9 km	MPC · JPL
480262	2015 HR_{71}	—	March 18, 2004	Kitt Peak	Spacewatch	·	2.3 km	MPC · JPL
480263	2015 HE_{75}	—	February 1, 2006	Kitt Peak	Spacewatch	(5)	1.1 km	MPC · JPL
480264	2015 HB_{76}	—	October 20, 2008	Mount Lemmon	Mount Lemmon Survey	·	1.4 km	MPC · JPL
480265	2015 HP_{78}	—	October 11, 2004	Kitt Peak	Spacewatch	·	920 m	MPC · JPL
480266	2015 HQ_{78}	—	October 27, 2005	Mount Lemmon	Mount Lemmon Survey	·	1.1 km	MPC · JPL
480267	2015 HY_{78}	—	September 30, 2003	Kitt Peak	Spacewatch	MIS	2.5 km	MPC · JPL
480268	2015 HP_{81}	—	October 31, 2007	Mount Lemmon	Mount Lemmon Survey	DOR	3.0 km	MPC · JPL
480269	2015 HZ_{81}	—	May 3, 2008	Kitt Peak	Spacewatch	V	420 m	MPC · JPL
480270	2015 HS_{82}	—	March 31, 2008	Kitt Peak	Spacewatch	·	640 m	MPC · JPL
480271	2015 HF_{83}	—	November 18, 2006	Kitt Peak	Spacewatch	·	960 m	MPC · JPL
480272	2015 HH_{87}	—	January 30, 2006	Kitt Peak	Spacewatch	(5)	1.2 km	MPC · JPL
480273	2015 HD_{88}	—	May 8, 2005	Mount Lemmon	Mount Lemmon Survey	·	620 m	MPC · JPL
480274	2015 HZ_{88}	—	October 31, 1999	Kitt Peak	Spacewatch	·	1.2 km	MPC · JPL
480275	2015 HJ_{89}	—	September 1, 2005	Kitt Peak	Spacewatch	·	1 km	MPC · JPL
480276	2015 HM_{90}	—	June 4, 2005	Kitt Peak	Spacewatch	·	710 m	MPC · JPL
480277	2015 HT_{92}	—	March 4, 2006	Mount Lemmon	Mount Lemmon Survey	·	1.5 km	MPC · JPL
480278	2015 HT_{94}	—	October 12, 2007	Mount Lemmon	Mount Lemmon Survey	·	1.8 km	MPC · JPL
480279	2015 HJ_{99}	—	November 15, 1995	Kitt Peak	Spacewatch	·	1.0 km	MPC · JPL
480280	2015 HL_{101}	—	September 17, 1998	Kitt Peak	Spacewatch	V	600 m	MPC · JPL
480281	2015 HW_{108}	—	September 27, 2003	Kitt Peak	Spacewatch	·	1.5 km	MPC · JPL
480282	2015 HL_{110}	—	October 10, 2012	Mount Lemmon	Mount Lemmon Survey	·	1.5 km	MPC · JPL
480283	2015 HC_{114}	—	July 20, 2004	Siding Spring	SSS	·	1.4 km	MPC · JPL
480284	2015 HN_{125}	—	October 10, 1997	Kitt Peak	Spacewatch	·	1.2 km	MPC · JPL
480285	2015 HR_{128}	—	October 1, 2000	Socorro	LINEAR	·	1.2 km	MPC · JPL
480286	2015 HV_{139}	—	August 22, 2004	Kitt Peak	Spacewatch	V	570 m	MPC · JPL
480287	2015 HH_{140}	—	December 30, 2007	Kitt Peak	Spacewatch	·	890 m	MPC · JPL
480288	2015 HK_{145}	—	August 21, 2006	Kitt Peak	Spacewatch	fast	680 m	MPC · JPL
480289	2015 HP_{145}	—	May 21, 2011	Mount Lemmon	Mount Lemmon Survey	·	1.1 km	MPC · JPL
480290	2015 HS_{147}	—	April 20, 2007	Mount Lemmon	Mount Lemmon Survey	·	900 m	MPC · JPL
480291	2015 HZ_{148}	—	January 10, 2007	Mount Lemmon	Mount Lemmon Survey	·	1.2 km	MPC · JPL
480292	2015 HW_{149}	—	August 24, 2008	Kitt Peak	Spacewatch	·	1.2 km	MPC · JPL
480293	2015 HL_{150}	—	October 17, 1995	Kitt Peak	Spacewatch	·	840 m	MPC · JPL
480294	2015 HR_{150}	—	September 20, 2009	Kitt Peak	Spacewatch	V	510 m	MPC · JPL
480295	2015 HA_{152}	—	February 16, 2004	Kitt Peak	Spacewatch	·	990 m	MPC · JPL
480296	2015 HS_{154}	—	May 20, 2010	Mount Lemmon	Mount Lemmon Survey	·	4.5 km	MPC · JPL
480297	2015 HB_{155}	—	May 3, 2010	WISE	WISE	·	2.0 km	MPC · JPL
480298	2015 HF_{156}	—	January 24, 2007	Kitt Peak	Spacewatch	·	1.1 km	MPC · JPL
480299	2015 HR_{164}	—	January 15, 1996	Kitt Peak	Spacewatch	·	1.8 km	MPC · JPL
480300	2015 HJ_{166}	—	June 27, 2005	Mount Lemmon	Mount Lemmon Survey	·	1.7 km	MPC · JPL

== 480301–480400 ==
back to top

Designation			Discovery			Properties		Ref
Permanent	Provisional	Named after	Date	Site	Discoverer(s)	Category	Diam.	Ref
480301	2015 HM_{166}	—	April 15, 2008	Kitt Peak	Spacewatch	·	760 m	MPC · JPL
480302	2015 HQ_{168}	—	November 17, 2001	Socorro	LINEAR	·	1.3 km	MPC · JPL
480303	2015 HW_{169}	—	April 10, 2005	Kitt Peak	Spacewatch	·	550 m	MPC · JPL
480304	2015 HA_{170}	—	September 13, 2007	Catalina	CSS	·	1.5 km	MPC · JPL
480305	2015 HB_{170}	—	November 14, 1995	Kitt Peak	Spacewatch	(7744)	1.8 km	MPC · JPL
480306	2015 HL_{172}	—	January 28, 2011	Catalina	CSS	PHO	870 m	MPC · JPL
480307	2015 HN_{172}	—	February 10, 2011	Catalina	CSS	·	1.7 km	MPC · JPL
480308	2015 HO_{173}	—	December 31, 2007	Kitt Peak	Spacewatch	·	820 m	MPC · JPL
480309	2015 HT_{173}	—	September 11, 2007	Kitt Peak	Spacewatch	·	1.9 km	MPC · JPL
480310	2015 HV_{173}	—	April 17, 2005	Kitt Peak	Spacewatch	·	2.3 km	MPC · JPL
480311	2015 HQ_{174}	—	May 13, 2004	Kitt Peak	Spacewatch	·	1.2 km	MPC · JPL
480312	2015 HR_{174}	—	January 11, 2008	Catalina	CSS	·	820 m	MPC · JPL
480313	2015 HV_{174}	—	August 30, 2005	Kitt Peak	Spacewatch	·	1.1 km	MPC · JPL
480314	2015 HJ_{175}	—	February 14, 2010	Mount Lemmon	Mount Lemmon Survey	·	1.5 km	MPC · JPL
480315	2015 HN_{175}	—	October 27, 2008	Mount Lemmon	Mount Lemmon Survey	·	1.7 km	MPC · JPL
480316	2015 HY_{175}	—	January 6, 2006	Catalina	CSS	·	2.9 km	MPC · JPL
480317	2015 HG_{176}	—	October 10, 2005	Kitt Peak	Spacewatch	·	1.5 km	MPC · JPL
480318	2015 HL_{176}	—	March 2, 2011	Catalina	CSS	·	1.4 km	MPC · JPL
480319	2015 HT_{177}	—	September 4, 2000	Kitt Peak	Spacewatch	·	1.3 km	MPC · JPL
480320	2015 HP_{178}	—	October 21, 2003	Kitt Peak	Spacewatch	·	660 m	MPC · JPL
480321	2015 HR_{178}	—	September 7, 1996	Kitt Peak	Spacewatch	·	1.1 km	MPC · JPL
480322	2015 HC_{179}	—	December 19, 2004	Mount Lemmon	Mount Lemmon Survey	AGN	1.3 km	MPC · JPL
480323	2015 HJ_{179}	—	January 6, 2010	Kitt Peak	Spacewatch	·	1.6 km	MPC · JPL
480324	2015 HU_{179}	—	March 25, 2006	Kitt Peak	Spacewatch	·	2.3 km	MPC · JPL
480325	2015 HA_{180}	—	November 8, 2009	Mount Lemmon	Mount Lemmon Survey	·	980 m	MPC · JPL
480326	2015 HC_{180}	—	November 17, 2009	Mount Lemmon	Mount Lemmon Survey	·	1.3 km	MPC · JPL
480327	2015 HD_{180}	—	March 15, 2010	WISE	WISE	·	3.3 km	MPC · JPL
480328	2015 HV_{180}	—	September 22, 2009	Kitt Peak	Spacewatch	V	720 m	MPC · JPL
480329	2015 HM_{181}	—	March 23, 2006	Catalina	CSS	·	1.8 km	MPC · JPL
480330	2015 HW_{181}	—	March 4, 2005	Kitt Peak	Spacewatch	·	720 m	MPC · JPL
480331	2015 JB	—	February 25, 2007	Mount Lemmon	Mount Lemmon Survey	·	1.6 km	MPC · JPL
480332	2015 JL_{3}	—	June 28, 1995	Kitt Peak	Spacewatch	EUN	1.5 km	MPC · JPL
480333	2015 JZ_{3}	—	September 15, 2006	Kitt Peak	Spacewatch	·	2.8 km	MPC · JPL
480334	2015 JH_{6}	—	September 11, 2005	Kitt Peak	Spacewatch	V	620 m	MPC · JPL
480335	2015 JC_{10}	—	October 12, 2004	Anderson Mesa	LONEOS	·	1.6 km	MPC · JPL
480336	2015 KU	—	November 17, 1999	Kitt Peak	Spacewatch	PHO	1.1 km	MPC · JPL
480337	2015 KA_{3}	—	February 23, 2007	Mount Lemmon	Mount Lemmon Survey	·	1.0 km	MPC · JPL
480338	2015 KN_{6}	—	October 8, 2004	Kitt Peak	Spacewatch	·	1.4 km	MPC · JPL
480339	2015 KH_{7}	—	January 28, 2014	Mount Lemmon	Mount Lemmon Survey	PHO	970 m	MPC · JPL
480340	2015 KV_{7}	—	January 2, 2009	Mount Lemmon	Mount Lemmon Survey	ADE	2.7 km	MPC · JPL
480341	2015 KX_{7}	—	November 3, 2004	Kitt Peak	Spacewatch	·	1.4 km	MPC · JPL
480342	2015 KE_{8}	—	March 6, 2014	Mount Lemmon	Mount Lemmon Survey	EOS	1.8 km	MPC · JPL
480343	2015 KM_{8}	—	April 15, 2010	Mount Lemmon	Mount Lemmon Survey	·	2.0 km	MPC · JPL
480344	2015 KV_{8}	—	January 26, 2006	Kitt Peak	Spacewatch	·	1.2 km	MPC · JPL
480345	2015 KA_{10}	—	January 1, 2009	Kitt Peak	Spacewatch	ADE	2.0 km	MPC · JPL
480346	2015 KP_{10}	—	May 29, 2011	Mount Lemmon	Mount Lemmon Survey	·	1.1 km	MPC · JPL
480347	2015 KE_{11}	—	April 2, 2011	Mount Lemmon	Mount Lemmon Survey	·	1.4 km	MPC · JPL
480348	2015 KG_{12}	—	January 5, 2013	Mount Lemmon	Mount Lemmon Survey	·	3.4 km	MPC · JPL
480349	2015 KK_{13}	—	January 28, 2007	Mount Lemmon	Mount Lemmon Survey	CYB	3.6 km	MPC · JPL
480350	2015 KU_{13}	—	May 28, 2004	Kitt Peak	Spacewatch	·	2.7 km	MPC · JPL
480351	2015 KJ_{14}	—	April 22, 2010	WISE	WISE	·	4.9 km	MPC · JPL
480352	2015 KA_{15}	—	February 27, 2009	Kitt Peak	Spacewatch	EOS	1.5 km	MPC · JPL
480353	2015 KD_{18}	—	May 24, 2011	Mount Lemmon	Mount Lemmon Survey	·	1.4 km	MPC · JPL
480354	2015 KP_{19}	—	May 19, 2004	Kitt Peak	Spacewatch	·	1.3 km	MPC · JPL
480355	2015 KR_{19}	—	February 7, 2008	Mount Lemmon	Mount Lemmon Survey	·	750 m	MPC · JPL
480356	2015 KS_{20}	—	November 30, 2008	Kitt Peak	Spacewatch	·	1.2 km	MPC · JPL
480357	2015 KM_{21}	—	April 8, 2006	Kitt Peak	Spacewatch	·	1.4 km	MPC · JPL
480358	2015 KE_{22}	—	November 4, 2004	Kitt Peak	Spacewatch	·	1.0 km	MPC · JPL
480359	2015 KS_{22}	—	September 2, 2010	Mount Lemmon	Mount Lemmon Survey	·	3.2 km	MPC · JPL
480360	2015 KH_{23}	—	January 16, 2004	Kitt Peak	Spacewatch	·	590 m	MPC · JPL
480361	2015 KL_{23}	—	November 12, 2005	Kitt Peak	Spacewatch	·	1.4 km	MPC · JPL
480362	2015 KR_{24}	—	April 12, 2010	WISE	WISE	·	2.9 km	MPC · JPL
480363	2015 KR_{25}	—	October 30, 2007	Mount Lemmon	Mount Lemmon Survey	·	1.7 km	MPC · JPL
480364	2015 KF_{27}	—	December 8, 2010	Mount Lemmon	Mount Lemmon Survey	·	840 m	MPC · JPL
480365	2015 KZ_{27}	—	December 30, 2007	Kitt Peak	Spacewatch	·	940 m	MPC · JPL
480366	2015 KK_{29}	—	March 13, 2010	Catalina	CSS	·	2.1 km	MPC · JPL
480367	2015 KR_{30}	—	December 22, 2003	Socorro	LINEAR	·	780 m	MPC · JPL
480368	2015 KN_{31}	—	March 20, 2010	Kitt Peak	Spacewatch	HOF	2.3 km	MPC · JPL
480369	2015 KD_{32}	—	December 16, 2007	Mount Lemmon	Mount Lemmon Survey	·	510 m	MPC · JPL
480370	2015 KT_{33}	—	December 25, 2013	Mount Lemmon	Mount Lemmon Survey	·	710 m	MPC · JPL
480371	2015 KC_{34}	—	October 20, 2008	Mount Lemmon	Mount Lemmon Survey	·	830 m	MPC · JPL
480372	2015 KA_{36}	—	June 20, 2004	Kitt Peak	Spacewatch	·	3.7 km	MPC · JPL
480373	2015 KC_{36}	—	May 19, 2010	Mount Lemmon	Mount Lemmon Survey	·	2.5 km	MPC · JPL
480374	2015 KL_{36}	—	August 11, 2007	Siding Spring	SSS	·	2.2 km	MPC · JPL
480375	2015 KL_{37}	—	October 29, 2003	Kitt Peak	Spacewatch	·	2.0 km	MPC · JPL
480376	2015 KW_{37}	—	March 10, 2008	Mount Lemmon	Mount Lemmon Survey	·	720 m	MPC · JPL
480377	2015 KR_{38}	—	January 30, 2000	Kitt Peak	Spacewatch	·	1.9 km	MPC · JPL
480378	2015 KV_{38}	—	January 18, 2008	Mount Lemmon	Mount Lemmon Survey	·	3.2 km	MPC · JPL
480379	2015 KJ_{39}	—	November 8, 2008	Kitt Peak	Spacewatch	·	1.1 km	MPC · JPL
480380	2015 KP_{40}	—	June 4, 2011	Mount Lemmon	Mount Lemmon Survey	·	850 m	MPC · JPL
480381	2015 KA_{41}	—	December 4, 2012	Mount Lemmon	Mount Lemmon Survey	·	1.4 km	MPC · JPL
480382	2015 KJ_{44}	—	October 15, 2004	Kitt Peak	Spacewatch	·	1.3 km	MPC · JPL
480383	2015 KC_{45}	—	April 12, 2010	WISE	WISE	EOS	1.6 km	MPC · JPL
480384	2015 KD_{45}	—	May 9, 2005	Mount Lemmon	Mount Lemmon Survey	·	560 m	MPC · JPL
480385	2015 KK_{46}	—	March 10, 2011	Mount Lemmon	Mount Lemmon Survey	·	1.1 km	MPC · JPL
480386	2015 KC_{47}	—	December 21, 2003	Kitt Peak	Spacewatch	EUN	1.1 km	MPC · JPL
480387	2015 KS_{48}	—	June 4, 2010	WISE	WISE	·	3.1 km	MPC · JPL
480388	2015 KM_{49}	—	November 23, 2006	Kitt Peak	Spacewatch	·	2.6 km	MPC · JPL
480389	2015 KW_{49}	—	October 9, 1999	Kitt Peak	Spacewatch	·	1.5 km	MPC · JPL
480390	2015 KO_{50}	—	March 5, 1997	Kitt Peak	Spacewatch	·	920 m	MPC · JPL
480391	2015 KE_{51}	—	March 29, 2006	Kitt Peak	Spacewatch	3:2	7.0 km	MPC · JPL
480392	2015 KS_{51}	—	October 11, 2007	Kitt Peak	Spacewatch	·	1.9 km	MPC · JPL
480393	2015 KW_{51}	—	November 18, 2008	Kitt Peak	Spacewatch	BRG	1.8 km	MPC · JPL
480394	2015 KX_{51}	—	October 3, 2003	Kitt Peak	Spacewatch	EUN	1.3 km	MPC · JPL
480395	2015 KL_{54}	—	September 22, 2003	Kitt Peak	Spacewatch	·	2.8 km	MPC · JPL
480396	2015 KQ_{54}	—	December 5, 2008	Kitt Peak	Spacewatch	·	1.5 km	MPC · JPL
480397	2015 KT_{58}	—	February 1, 2006	Mount Lemmon	Mount Lemmon Survey	·	1.2 km	MPC · JPL
480398	2015 KG_{59}	—	January 23, 2006	Kitt Peak	Spacewatch	·	1.5 km	MPC · JPL
480399	2015 KA_{60}	—	May 15, 2010	WISE	WISE	·	2.4 km	MPC · JPL
480400	2015 KC_{67}	—	May 23, 2011	Mount Lemmon	Mount Lemmon Survey	·	1.1 km	MPC · JPL

== 480401–480500 ==
back to top

Designation			Discovery			Properties		Ref
Permanent	Provisional	Named after	Date	Site	Discoverer(s)	Category	Diam.	Ref
480401	2015 KM_{67}	—	April 6, 2011	Mount Lemmon	Mount Lemmon Survey	V	570 m	MPC · JPL
480402	2015 KC_{69}	—	March 26, 2001	Kitt Peak	Spacewatch	·	2.0 km	MPC · JPL
480403	2015 KU_{71}	—	September 24, 2008	Kitt Peak	Spacewatch	KRM	1.6 km	MPC · JPL
480404	2015 KK_{77}	—	June 21, 2007	Mount Lemmon	Mount Lemmon Survey	·	1.2 km	MPC · JPL
480405	2015 KN_{77}	—	December 30, 2013	Mount Lemmon	Mount Lemmon Survey	·	1.9 km	MPC · JPL
480406	2015 KZ_{80}	—	July 26, 2010	WISE	WISE	·	2.5 km	MPC · JPL
480407	2015 KL_{81}	—	May 14, 2010	WISE	WISE	·	1.9 km	MPC · JPL
480408	2015 KQ_{82}	—	May 1, 2003	Kitt Peak	Spacewatch	·	1.1 km	MPC · JPL
480409	2015 KR_{83}	—	August 24, 2007	Kitt Peak	Spacewatch	·	1.4 km	MPC · JPL
480410	2015 KK_{90}	—	October 27, 2011	Mount Lemmon	Mount Lemmon Survey	·	3.0 km	MPC · JPL
480411	2015 KN_{91}	—	November 17, 2009	Mount Lemmon	Mount Lemmon Survey	·	800 m	MPC · JPL
480412	2015 KT_{92}	—	November 18, 2001	Socorro	LINEAR	V	800 m	MPC · JPL
480413	2015 KS_{94}	—	December 28, 2013	Kitt Peak	Spacewatch	·	2.0 km	MPC · JPL
480414	2015 KY_{94}	—	October 6, 2008	Mount Lemmon	Mount Lemmon Survey	·	1.3 km	MPC · JPL
480415	2015 KB_{95}	—	December 31, 2007	Mount Lemmon	Mount Lemmon Survey	·	2.9 km	MPC · JPL
480416	2015 KW_{97}	—	November 6, 2012	Kitt Peak	Spacewatch	EUN	1.2 km	MPC · JPL
480417	2015 KZ_{98}	—	January 4, 2013	Mount Lemmon	Mount Lemmon Survey	·	1.8 km	MPC · JPL
480418	2015 KN_{99}	—	October 27, 2009	Mount Lemmon	Mount Lemmon Survey	PHO	1.0 km	MPC · JPL
480419	2015 KB_{107}	—	September 23, 2008	Mount Lemmon	Mount Lemmon Survey	·	1.1 km	MPC · JPL
480420	2015 KX_{111}	—	March 9, 2005	Mount Lemmon	Mount Lemmon Survey	·	2.4 km	MPC · JPL
480421	2015 KD_{112}	—	September 30, 2005	Kitt Peak	Spacewatch	·	1.4 km	MPC · JPL
480422	2015 KY_{112}	—	October 20, 2008	Kitt Peak	Spacewatch	·	1.2 km	MPC · JPL
480423	2015 KZ_{113}	—	April 19, 2009	Mount Lemmon	Mount Lemmon Survey	·	2.9 km	MPC · JPL
480424	2015 KK_{114}	—	November 12, 2006	Mount Lemmon	Mount Lemmon Survey	EOS	1.8 km	MPC · JPL
480425	2015 KL_{117}	—	January 14, 2010	WISE	WISE	·	2.0 km	MPC · JPL
480426	2015 KC_{122}	—	March 28, 2011	Catalina	CSS	·	1.8 km	MPC · JPL
480427	2015 KR_{122}	—	November 2, 2007	Kitt Peak	Spacewatch	KOR	1.4 km	MPC · JPL
480428	2015 KZ_{122}	—	December 19, 2004	Mount Lemmon	Mount Lemmon Survey	·	2.3 km	MPC · JPL
480429	2015 KE_{123}	—	June 3, 2011	Mount Lemmon	Mount Lemmon Survey	·	1.8 km	MPC · JPL
480430	2015 KD_{125}	—	September 22, 2003	Kitt Peak	Spacewatch	·	1.6 km	MPC · JPL
480431	2015 KD_{126}	—	November 2, 2007	Kitt Peak	Spacewatch	·	2.3 km	MPC · JPL
480432	2015 KC_{128}	—	December 21, 2003	Apache Point	SDSS	·	750 m	MPC · JPL
480433	2015 KS_{128}	—	September 19, 2003	Kitt Peak	Spacewatch	EUN	960 m	MPC · JPL
480434	2015 KU_{128}	—	October 2, 2006	Mount Lemmon	Mount Lemmon Survey	·	2.5 km	MPC · JPL
480435	2015 KU_{129}	—	June 8, 2008	Kitt Peak	Spacewatch	·	1.2 km	MPC · JPL
480436	2015 KZ_{131}	—	December 15, 2007	Kitt Peak	Spacewatch	·	2.3 km	MPC · JPL
480437	2015 KA_{132}	—	November 16, 2009	Mount Lemmon	Mount Lemmon Survey	V	710 m	MPC · JPL
480438	2015 KH_{132}	—	November 29, 2005	Kitt Peak	Spacewatch	T_{j} (2.99)	4.6 km	MPC · JPL
480439	2015 KC_{134}	—	January 17, 2011	Mount Lemmon	Mount Lemmon Survey	·	1.5 km	MPC · JPL
480440	2015 KY_{134}	—	April 19, 2004	Kitt Peak	Spacewatch	·	2.3 km	MPC · JPL
480441	2015 KR_{136}	—	October 2, 2003	Kitt Peak	Spacewatch	·	1.6 km	MPC · JPL
480442	2015 KE_{138}	—	April 11, 2010	Kitt Peak	Spacewatch	·	4.2 km	MPC · JPL
480443	2015 KC_{141}	—	March 5, 2008	Mount Lemmon	Mount Lemmon Survey	·	580 m	MPC · JPL
480444	2015 KA_{142}	—	November 9, 2007	Kitt Peak	Spacewatch	·	1.8 km	MPC · JPL
480445	2015 KF_{143}	—	January 29, 2007	Kitt Peak	Spacewatch	·	1.1 km	MPC · JPL
480446	2015 KK_{144}	—	October 25, 2005	Mount Lemmon	Mount Lemmon Survey	T_{j} (2.98)	4.3 km	MPC · JPL
480447	2015 KY_{144}	—	November 7, 2013	Kitt Peak	Spacewatch	·	660 m	MPC · JPL
480448	2015 KY_{146}	—	October 1, 2008	Mount Lemmon	Mount Lemmon Survey	·	1.5 km	MPC · JPL
480449	2015 KV_{149}	—	November 16, 1995	Kitt Peak	Spacewatch	·	1.4 km	MPC · JPL
480450	2015 KO_{156}	—	January 10, 2008	Mount Lemmon	Mount Lemmon Survey	T_{j} (2.99)	3.3 km	MPC · JPL
480451	2015 KR_{158}	—	June 3, 2010	WISE	WISE	·	2.2 km	MPC · JPL
480452	2015 KZ_{158}	—	October 11, 2007	Kitt Peak	Spacewatch	·	2.1 km	MPC · JPL
480453	2015 KT_{159}	—	May 27, 2010	WISE	WISE	·	3.3 km	MPC · JPL
480454	2015 KX_{159}	—	June 11, 2004	Kitt Peak	Spacewatch	·	3.7 km	MPC · JPL
480455	2015 KZ_{159}	—	February 2, 2006	Mount Lemmon	Mount Lemmon Survey	·	1.6 km	MPC · JPL
480456	2015 LS	—	August 10, 2007	Kitt Peak	Spacewatch	·	1.5 km	MPC · JPL
480457	2015 LB_{1}	—	May 31, 2003	Kitt Peak	Spacewatch	EUN	1.0 km	MPC · JPL
480458	2015 LJ_{1}	—	May 20, 2006	Kitt Peak	Spacewatch	·	1.7 km	MPC · JPL
480459	2015 LP_{2}	—	May 21, 2010	WISE	WISE	T_{j} (2.98)	3.0 km	MPC · JPL
480460	2015 LN_{3}	—	March 25, 2006	Mount Lemmon	Mount Lemmon Survey	·	1.8 km	MPC · JPL
480461	2015 LP_{3}	—	January 27, 2006	Mount Lemmon	Mount Lemmon Survey	·	3.4 km	MPC · JPL
480462	2015 LA_{4}	—	October 1, 2005	Kitt Peak	Spacewatch	·	3.6 km	MPC · JPL
480463	2015 LA_{5}	—	December 5, 2007	Mount Lemmon	Mount Lemmon Survey	(43176)	3.2 km	MPC · JPL
480464	2015 LR_{7}	—	March 31, 2009	Catalina	CSS	·	2.8 km	MPC · JPL
480465	2015 LS_{7}	—	February 26, 2014	Kitt Peak	Spacewatch	EOS	1.8 km	MPC · JPL
480466	2015 LC_{8}	—	September 21, 2003	Kitt Peak	Spacewatch	MAR	950 m	MPC · JPL
480467	2015 LE_{8}	—	May 14, 2010	WISE	WISE	·	3.3 km	MPC · JPL
480468	2015 LO_{8}	—	March 18, 2010	Kitt Peak	Spacewatch	·	1.7 km	MPC · JPL
480469	2015 LX_{8}	—	May 22, 2011	Mount Lemmon	Mount Lemmon Survey	·	1.3 km	MPC · JPL
480470	2015 LO_{9}	—	April 24, 2011	Mount Lemmon	Mount Lemmon Survey	·	1.1 km	MPC · JPL
480471	2015 LC_{10}	—	August 14, 2012	Kitt Peak	Spacewatch	(2076)	840 m	MPC · JPL
480472	2015 LO_{10}	—	November 19, 2008	Kitt Peak	Spacewatch	·	1.3 km	MPC · JPL
480473	2015 LK_{11}	—	November 24, 2011	Mount Lemmon	Mount Lemmon Survey	·	3.2 km	MPC · JPL
480474	2015 LP_{14}	—	October 26, 2005	Kitt Peak	Spacewatch	·	2.9 km	MPC · JPL
480475	2015 LQ_{14}	—	April 26, 2010	WISE	WISE	·	2.4 km	MPC · JPL
480476	2015 LZ_{21}	—	May 10, 2004	Campo Imperatore	CINEOS	V	830 m	MPC · JPL
480477	2015 LB_{22}	—	November 3, 2008	Catalina	CSS	·	1.9 km	MPC · JPL
480478	2015 LG_{22}	—	May 13, 2010	Mount Lemmon	Mount Lemmon Survey	·	2.4 km	MPC · JPL
480479	2015 LM_{22}	—	February 7, 2008	Mount Lemmon	Mount Lemmon Survey	·	1.1 km	MPC · JPL
480480	2015 LN_{22}	—	October 28, 2005	Mount Lemmon	Mount Lemmon Survey	·	1.4 km	MPC · JPL
480481	2015 LV_{22}	—	April 17, 2009	Kitt Peak	Spacewatch	·	4.2 km	MPC · JPL
480482	2015 LD_{24}	—	March 25, 2014	Mount Lemmon	Mount Lemmon Survey	·	2.8 km	MPC · JPL
480483	2015 LS_{25}	—	January 17, 2007	Kitt Peak	Spacewatch	·	810 m	MPC · JPL
480484	2015 LY_{26}	—	September 26, 2006	Kitt Peak	Spacewatch	·	1.7 km	MPC · JPL
480485	2015 LC_{27}	—	February 26, 2009	Kitt Peak	Spacewatch	NEM	2.2 km	MPC · JPL
480486	2015 LT_{28}	—	December 13, 2006	Kitt Peak	Spacewatch	·	3.2 km	MPC · JPL
480487	2015 LU_{28}	—	October 12, 2007	Mount Lemmon	Mount Lemmon Survey	HOF	2.7 km	MPC · JPL
480488	2015 LD_{30}	—	November 1, 2006	Mount Lemmon	Mount Lemmon Survey	·	3.7 km	MPC · JPL
480489	2015 LH_{30}	—	January 20, 2009	Kitt Peak	Spacewatch	·	1.9 km	MPC · JPL
480490	2015 LB_{31}	—	September 11, 2010	Mount Lemmon	Mount Lemmon Survey	·	3.5 km	MPC · JPL
480491	2015 LG_{31}	—	January 5, 2013	Mount Lemmon	Mount Lemmon Survey	·	3.7 km	MPC · JPL
480492	2015 LO_{31}	—	October 8, 2012	Catalina	CSS	·	1.1 km	MPC · JPL
480493	2015 LR_{31}	—	September 4, 2010	Mount Lemmon	Mount Lemmon Survey	·	2.5 km	MPC · JPL
480494	2015 LY_{31}	—	April 19, 2007	Mount Lemmon	Mount Lemmon Survey	MAS	810 m	MPC · JPL
480495	2015 LS_{32}	—	July 1, 2011	Mount Lemmon	Mount Lemmon Survey	·	1.2 km	MPC · JPL
480496	2015 LB_{33}	—	December 17, 2007	Kitt Peak	Spacewatch	·	2.1 km	MPC · JPL
480497	2015 LV_{33}	—	January 10, 2007	Kitt Peak	Spacewatch	·	4.0 km	MPC · JPL
480498	2015 LR_{34}	—	April 10, 2010	Mount Lemmon	Mount Lemmon Survey	·	1.9 km	MPC · JPL
480499	2015 LQ_{35}	—	October 30, 2007	Mount Lemmon	Mount Lemmon Survey	·	1.6 km	MPC · JPL
480500	2015 LZ_{35}	—	December 17, 2009	Kitt Peak	Spacewatch	·	1.6 km	MPC · JPL

== 480501–480600 ==
back to top

Designation			Discovery			Properties		Ref
Permanent	Provisional	Named after	Date	Site	Discoverer(s)	Category	Diam.	Ref
480501	2015 LO_{36}	—	November 4, 1999	Kitt Peak	Spacewatch	·	1.4 km	MPC · JPL
480502	2015 LU_{36}	—	October 22, 2005	Kitt Peak	Spacewatch	·	1.3 km	MPC · JPL
480503	2015 LK_{38}	—	October 21, 2003	Kitt Peak	Spacewatch	·	1.3 km	MPC · JPL
480504	2015 LN_{38}	—	August 24, 2011	Siding Spring	SSS	·	1.6 km	MPC · JPL
480505	2015 MM	—	March 15, 2008	Mount Lemmon	Mount Lemmon Survey	·	1.1 km	MPC · JPL
480506	2015 MN	—	May 21, 2010	WISE	WISE	·	4.0 km	MPC · JPL
480507	2015 MR	—	November 4, 2007	Mount Lemmon	Mount Lemmon Survey	·	2.5 km	MPC · JPL
480508	2015 MT	—	September 15, 2007	Mount Lemmon	Mount Lemmon Survey	615	1.6 km	MPC · JPL
480509	2015 MY	—	May 13, 2004	Anderson Mesa	LONEOS	·	3.2 km	MPC · JPL
480510	2015 MV_{1}	—	August 31, 2005	Kitt Peak	Spacewatch	·	1.0 km	MPC · JPL
480511	2015 MQ_{2}	—	September 17, 2010	Kitt Peak	Spacewatch	·	2.9 km	MPC · JPL
480512	2015 ML_{5}	—	April 13, 2005	Kitt Peak	Spacewatch	·	2.3 km	MPC · JPL
480513	2015 MS_{5}	—	April 5, 2003	Kitt Peak	Spacewatch	·	1.2 km	MPC · JPL
480514	2015 ME_{6}	—	June 28, 2010	WISE	WISE	LIX	3.1 km	MPC · JPL
480515	2015 MJ_{6}	—	February 14, 2010	Kitt Peak	Spacewatch	·	1.4 km	MPC · JPL
480516	2015 MK_{6}	—	December 22, 2006	Kitt Peak	Spacewatch	·	3.6 km	MPC · JPL
480517	2015 MP_{6}	—	December 15, 2001	Socorro	LINEAR	·	2.8 km	MPC · JPL
480518	2015 MJ_{7}	—	January 3, 2013	Mount Lemmon	Mount Lemmon Survey	EOS	1.7 km	MPC · JPL
480519	2015 MZ_{7}	—	September 22, 2011	Kitt Peak	Spacewatch	·	1.7 km	MPC · JPL
480520	2015 MP_{8}	—	November 17, 2006	Kitt Peak	Spacewatch	·	1.7 km	MPC · JPL
480521	2015 MC_{9}	—	June 18, 2010	WISE	WISE	·	2.9 km	MPC · JPL
480522	2015 MN_{9}	—	September 26, 2011	Mount Lemmon	Mount Lemmon Survey	·	1.8 km	MPC · JPL
480523	2015 MS_{9}	—	October 20, 2003	Kitt Peak	Spacewatch	·	1.6 km	MPC · JPL
480524	2015 MV_{9}	—	April 2, 2002	Kitt Peak	Spacewatch	·	1.9 km	MPC · JPL
480525	2015 MJ_{10}	—	June 14, 2004	Kitt Peak	Spacewatch	·	2.9 km	MPC · JPL
480526	2015 MD_{11}	—	October 9, 2005	Kitt Peak	Spacewatch	EOS	1.9 km	MPC · JPL
480527	2015 ME_{11}	—	July 8, 2010	WISE	WISE	·	2.9 km	MPC · JPL
480528	2015 MM_{13}	—	June 25, 2010	WISE	WISE	T_{j} (2.99)	4.6 km	MPC · JPL
480529	2015 MN_{13}	—	November 4, 2007	Kitt Peak	Spacewatch	·	2.6 km	MPC · JPL
480530	2015 MT_{14}	—	March 5, 2008	Mount Lemmon	Mount Lemmon Survey	·	2.7 km	MPC · JPL
480531	2015 MV_{19}	—	October 11, 2007	Mount Lemmon	Mount Lemmon Survey	·	1.6 km	MPC · JPL
480532	2015 MP_{20}	—	October 25, 2003	Kitt Peak	Spacewatch	·	1.6 km	MPC · JPL
480533	2015 MW_{20}	—	March 8, 2005	Kitt Peak	Spacewatch	·	680 m	MPC · JPL
480534	2015 MQ_{25}	—	September 23, 2011	Kitt Peak	Spacewatch	(1298)	2.5 km	MPC · JPL
480535	2015 MK_{27}	—	December 4, 2012	Mount Lemmon	Mount Lemmon Survey	·	2.6 km	MPC · JPL
480536	2015 MQ_{35}	—	May 28, 2008	Mount Lemmon	Mount Lemmon Survey	·	1.3 km	MPC · JPL
480537	2015 MK_{40}	—	June 21, 2007	Mount Lemmon	Mount Lemmon Survey	MAR	1.1 km	MPC · JPL
480538	2015 MH_{43}	—	October 24, 2008	Kitt Peak	Spacewatch	·	1.7 km	MPC · JPL
480539	2015 MV_{44}	—	November 20, 2006	Kitt Peak	Spacewatch	EOS	2.3 km	MPC · JPL
480540	2015 MH_{45}	—	November 22, 2006	Kitt Peak	Spacewatch	EOS	1.8 km	MPC · JPL
480541	2015 MS_{45}	—	May 16, 2009	Kitt Peak	Spacewatch	·	1.9 km	MPC · JPL
480542	2015 MU_{46}	—	December 24, 2011	Mount Lemmon	Mount Lemmon Survey	·	3.3 km	MPC · JPL
480543	2015 MW_{49}	—	November 22, 2006	Kitt Peak	Spacewatch	·	2.5 km	MPC · JPL
480544	2015 MG_{50}	—	July 5, 2010	WISE	WISE	·	4.2 km	MPC · JPL
480545	2015 MJ_{52}	—	June 8, 2010	WISE	WISE	·	4.2 km	MPC · JPL
480546	2015 MR_{55}	—	October 20, 2011	Mount Lemmon	Mount Lemmon Survey	·	2.9 km	MPC · JPL
480547	2015 MY_{55}	—	December 14, 2004	Kitt Peak	Spacewatch	·	1.9 km	MPC · JPL
480548	2015 MF_{56}	—	January 6, 2010	Kitt Peak	Spacewatch	·	1.2 km	MPC · JPL
480549	2015 MH_{56}	—	May 2, 2009	Siding Spring	SSS	·	2.9 km	MPC · JPL
480550	2015 MV_{56}	—	September 14, 2007	Mount Lemmon	Mount Lemmon Survey	·	2.1 km	MPC · JPL
480551	2015 MJ_{57}	—	January 31, 2013	Mount Lemmon	Mount Lemmon Survey	·	2.4 km	MPC · JPL
480552	2015 MM_{57}	—	June 21, 2010	Mount Lemmon	Mount Lemmon Survey	EOS	1.8 km	MPC · JPL
480553	2015 MD_{58}	—	December 24, 2006	Kitt Peak	Spacewatch	EOS	1.9 km	MPC · JPL
480554	2015 MK_{59}	—	January 15, 2009	Kitt Peak	Spacewatch	MAR	1.4 km	MPC · JPL
480555	2015 MP_{60}	—	March 26, 2001	Kitt Peak	Spacewatch	·	1.6 km	MPC · JPL
480556	2015 MZ_{62}	—	September 19, 2006	Kitt Peak	Spacewatch	·	1.7 km	MPC · JPL
480557	2015 MD_{63}	—	May 19, 2010	WISE	WISE	·	2.5 km	MPC · JPL
480558	2015 MM_{63}	—	June 14, 2004	Kitt Peak	Spacewatch	·	5.1 km	MPC · JPL
480559	2015 MS_{65}	—	April 4, 2003	Anderson Mesa	LONEOS	·	3.1 km	MPC · JPL
480560	2015 MB_{66}	—	June 24, 2010	WISE	WISE	VER	2.6 km	MPC · JPL
480561	2015 MH_{67}	—	March 13, 2002	Socorro	LINEAR	·	1.6 km	MPC · JPL
480562	2015 MJ_{68}	—	May 25, 2003	Kitt Peak	Spacewatch	·	1.2 km	MPC · JPL
480563	2015 ME_{69}	—	November 4, 2005	Kitt Peak	Spacewatch	V	730 m	MPC · JPL
480564	2015 MH_{69}	—	November 19, 2003	Kitt Peak	Spacewatch	·	1.6 km	MPC · JPL
480565	2015 MK_{69}	—	November 20, 2006	Kitt Peak	Spacewatch	·	1.8 km	MPC · JPL
480566	2015 MQ_{69}	—	October 5, 2005	Catalina	CSS	·	4.2 km	MPC · JPL
480567	2015 MT_{69}	—	October 21, 2006	Kitt Peak	Spacewatch	·	790 m	MPC · JPL
480568	2015 MV_{69}	—	August 29, 2006	Kitt Peak	Spacewatch	HOF	2.3 km	MPC · JPL
480569	2015 MD_{70}	—	August 29, 2005	Kitt Peak	Spacewatch	·	2.8 km	MPC · JPL
480570	2015 MK_{70}	—	September 17, 2004	Kitt Peak	Spacewatch	·	4.7 km	MPC · JPL
480571	2015 MD_{71}	—	March 11, 2005	Mount Lemmon	Mount Lemmon Survey	·	1.7 km	MPC · JPL
480572	2015 MO_{72}	—	December 18, 2007	Mount Lemmon	Mount Lemmon Survey	·	3.2 km	MPC · JPL
480573	2015 MO_{74}	—	November 5, 2007	Kitt Peak	Spacewatch	AGN	1.0 km	MPC · JPL
480574	2015 MM_{75}	—	May 22, 2010	WISE	WISE	·	2.7 km	MPC · JPL
480575	2015 MB_{76}	—	January 16, 2013	Mount Lemmon	Mount Lemmon Survey	·	2.6 km	MPC · JPL
480576	2015 MM_{76}	—	February 6, 2008	Catalina	CSS	·	3.1 km	MPC · JPL
480577	2015 MY_{77}	—	February 2, 2005	Kitt Peak	Spacewatch	·	1.5 km	MPC · JPL
480578	2015 ME_{79}	—	January 29, 2003	Kitt Peak	Spacewatch	V	640 m	MPC · JPL
480579	2015 ML_{79}	—	December 18, 2001	Socorro	LINEAR	EOS	1.9 km	MPC · JPL
480580	2015 MP_{79}	—	October 1, 2005	Mount Lemmon	Mount Lemmon Survey	·	2.2 km	MPC · JPL
480581	2015 MH_{80}	—	July 12, 2005	Kitt Peak	Spacewatch	·	1.8 km	MPC · JPL
480582	2015 MU_{80}	—	November 1, 2005	Catalina	CSS	·	2.6 km	MPC · JPL
480583	2015 MB_{81}	—	May 29, 2010	WISE	WISE	·	4.9 km	MPC · JPL
480584	2015 MP_{81}	—	November 22, 2006	Kitt Peak	Spacewatch	·	3.6 km	MPC · JPL
480585	2015 MT_{81}	—	September 22, 2011	Kitt Peak	Spacewatch	·	1.8 km	MPC · JPL
480586	2015 MV_{81}	—	September 27, 2011	Mount Lemmon	Mount Lemmon Survey	·	2.0 km	MPC · JPL
480587	2015 MF_{82}	—	September 3, 2010	Mount Lemmon	Mount Lemmon Survey	·	2.3 km	MPC · JPL
480588	2015 MK_{82}	—	October 30, 2007	Kitt Peak	Spacewatch	·	1.8 km	MPC · JPL
480589	2015 MS_{82}	—	January 11, 2008	Kitt Peak	Spacewatch	·	1.9 km	MPC · JPL
480590	2015 MB_{84}	—	March 12, 2005	Socorro	LINEAR	·	1.7 km	MPC · JPL
480591	2015 MF_{84}	—	January 3, 2013	Mount Lemmon	Mount Lemmon Survey	·	2.2 km	MPC · JPL
480592	2015 MJ_{85}	—	September 24, 1995	Kitt Peak	Spacewatch	·	1.5 km	MPC · JPL
480593	2015 MZ_{85}	—	February 13, 2002	Kitt Peak	Spacewatch	VER	2.9 km	MPC · JPL
480594	2015 MG_{86}	—	October 22, 2011	Kitt Peak	Spacewatch	·	2.5 km	MPC · JPL
480595	2015 MK_{86}	—	November 16, 2011	Mount Lemmon	Mount Lemmon Survey	·	1.9 km	MPC · JPL
480596	2015 MD_{87}	—	November 18, 2011	Mount Lemmon	Mount Lemmon Survey	EOS	1.7 km	MPC · JPL
480597	2015 MS_{87}	—	October 30, 2005	Kitt Peak	Spacewatch	·	2.7 km	MPC · JPL
480598	2015 MQ_{91}	—	June 21, 2010	WISE	WISE	·	2.3 km	MPC · JPL
480599	2015 MX_{92}	—	March 16, 2007	Mount Lemmon	Mount Lemmon Survey	·	1.8 km	MPC · JPL
480600	2015 MG_{93}	—	June 5, 2010	WISE	WISE	·	3.6 km	MPC · JPL

== 480601–480700 ==
back to top

Designation			Discovery			Properties		Ref
Permanent	Provisional	Named after	Date	Site	Discoverer(s)	Category	Diam.	Ref
480601	2015 MR_{93}	—	October 6, 2008	Mount Lemmon	Mount Lemmon Survey	·	1.3 km	MPC · JPL
480602	2015 MY_{93}	—	January 20, 2009	Mount Lemmon	Mount Lemmon Survey	·	1.6 km	MPC · JPL
480603	2015 MH_{97}	—	March 19, 2010	Mount Lemmon	Mount Lemmon Survey	·	1.4 km	MPC · JPL
480604	2015 MB_{98}	—	January 28, 2004	Kitt Peak	Spacewatch	AGN	1.1 km	MPC · JPL
480605	2015 MK_{103}	—	August 31, 2005	Kitt Peak	Spacewatch	·	2.2 km	MPC · JPL
480606	2015 MT_{103}	—	April 24, 2004	Kitt Peak	Spacewatch	EOS	1.8 km	MPC · JPL
480607	2015 MB_{104}	—	April 11, 2010	Kitt Peak	Spacewatch	·	1.7 km	MPC · JPL
480608	2015 MG_{104}	—	May 20, 2010	WISE	WISE	·	4.6 km	MPC · JPL
480609	2015 MP_{104}	—	May 31, 2006	Mount Lemmon	Mount Lemmon Survey	·	1.8 km	MPC · JPL
480610	2015 MB_{106}	—	January 5, 2013	Mount Lemmon	Mount Lemmon Survey	·	3.2 km	MPC · JPL
480611	2015 MF_{107}	—	June 21, 2010	WISE	WISE	·	1.9 km	MPC · JPL
480612	2015 ML_{107}	—	September 18, 2010	Mount Lemmon	Mount Lemmon Survey	·	3.5 km	MPC · JPL
480613	2015 MX_{108}	—	August 19, 2006	Kitt Peak	Spacewatch	·	2.2 km	MPC · JPL
480614	2015 MD_{110}	—	May 11, 2005	Kitt Peak	Spacewatch	·	1.6 km	MPC · JPL
480615	2015 MP_{110}	—	December 5, 2005	Kitt Peak	Spacewatch	·	3.7 km	MPC · JPL
480616	2015 MP_{112}	—	May 16, 2009	Kitt Peak	Spacewatch	·	2.2 km	MPC · JPL
480617	2015 MU_{112}	—	April 2, 2005	Mount Lemmon	Mount Lemmon Survey	·	1.6 km	MPC · JPL
480618	2015 MV_{112}	—	April 4, 2008	Mount Lemmon	Mount Lemmon Survey	VER	3.5 km	MPC · JPL
480619	2015 MC_{113}	—	November 18, 2011	Mount Lemmon	Mount Lemmon Survey	·	3.1 km	MPC · JPL
480620	2015 MO_{115}	—	May 6, 1997	Kitt Peak	Spacewatch	·	1.6 km	MPC · JPL
480621	2015 MF_{123}	—	September 29, 2005	Mount Lemmon	Mount Lemmon Survey	EOS	1.7 km	MPC · JPL
480622	2015 MA_{127}	—	October 10, 2007	Kitt Peak	Spacewatch	·	1.7 km	MPC · JPL
480623	2015 MH_{127}	—	December 13, 2006	Mount Lemmon	Mount Lemmon Survey	(21885)	2.7 km	MPC · JPL
480624	2015 ML_{128}	—	June 13, 2010	WISE	WISE	·	3.6 km	MPC · JPL
480625	2015 MA_{130}	—	August 25, 2004	Kitt Peak	Spacewatch	·	2.9 km	MPC · JPL
480626	2015 NX_{1}	—	November 3, 2008	Mount Lemmon	Mount Lemmon Survey	MAR	1.2 km	MPC · JPL
480627	2015 NX_{3}	—	April 29, 2009	Mount Lemmon	Mount Lemmon Survey	LIX	3.9 km	MPC · JPL
480628	2015 NR_{4}	—	February 11, 2004	Kitt Peak	Spacewatch	·	2.4 km	MPC · JPL
480629	2015 NZ_{5}	—	October 31, 2005	Mount Lemmon	Mount Lemmon Survey	·	2.9 km	MPC · JPL
480630	2015 NG_{7}	—	April 4, 2008	Mount Lemmon	Mount Lemmon Survey	EOS	1.7 km	MPC · JPL
480631	2015 NL_{7}	—	October 14, 2007	Mount Lemmon	Mount Lemmon Survey	·	1.8 km	MPC · JPL
480632	2015 NS_{7}	—	November 5, 2007	Kitt Peak	Spacewatch	·	2.0 km	MPC · JPL
480633	2015 NT_{7}	—	December 15, 2007	Kitt Peak	Spacewatch	·	2.0 km	MPC · JPL
480634	2015 NZ_{7}	—	February 16, 2013	Mount Lemmon	Mount Lemmon Survey	·	2.9 km	MPC · JPL
480635	2015 NC_{8}	—	June 12, 2011	Mount Lemmon	Mount Lemmon Survey	·	1.7 km	MPC · JPL
480636	2015 NA_{9}	—	December 11, 2006	Kitt Peak	Spacewatch	·	3.5 km	MPC · JPL
480637	2015 NG_{9}	—	October 26, 2005	Kitt Peak	Spacewatch	·	2.5 km	MPC · JPL
480638	2015 NQ_{9}	—	May 22, 2010	WISE	WISE	·	2.5 km	MPC · JPL
480639	2015 NW_{11}	—	February 6, 2014	Catalina	CSS	·	2.2 km	MPC · JPL
480640	2015 NR_{12}	—	April 2, 2006	Mount Lemmon	Mount Lemmon Survey	·	2.4 km	MPC · JPL
480641	2015 NJ_{14}	—	October 27, 2005	Kitt Peak	Spacewatch	HYG	3.1 km	MPC · JPL
480642	2015 NT_{14}	—	October 25, 2005	Kitt Peak	Spacewatch	·	3.3 km	MPC · JPL
480643	2015 NQ_{16}	—	October 1, 2005	Kitt Peak	Spacewatch	·	1.9 km	MPC · JPL
480644	2015 NX_{16}	—	April 16, 2008	Mount Lemmon	Mount Lemmon Survey	·	3.3 km	MPC · JPL
480645	2015 NP_{20}	—	October 27, 2011	Mount Lemmon	Mount Lemmon Survey	·	3.2 km	MPC · JPL
480646	2015 NM_{21}	—	January 29, 2014	Mount Lemmon	Mount Lemmon Survey	EUN	1.4 km	MPC · JPL
480647	2015 NU_{21}	—	April 1, 2010	WISE	WISE	·	2.7 km	MPC · JPL
480648	2015 NG_{23}	—	September 30, 2003	Kitt Peak	Spacewatch	·	2.2 km	MPC · JPL
480649	2015 OG_{1}	—	July 2, 2011	Kitt Peak	Spacewatch	EUN	1.3 km	MPC · JPL
480650	2015 OB_{7}	—	September 15, 2010	Mount Lemmon	Mount Lemmon Survey	·	3.2 km	MPC · JPL
480651	2015 OK_{10}	—	November 9, 2007	Kitt Peak	Spacewatch	·	1.9 km	MPC · JPL
480652	2015 OY_{11}	—	January 5, 2013	Mount Lemmon	Mount Lemmon Survey	EOS	2.0 km	MPC · JPL
480653	2015 OX_{12}	—	June 15, 2010	Mount Lemmon	Mount Lemmon Survey	BRA	1.7 km	MPC · JPL
480654	2015 OG_{13}	—	January 10, 2013	Kitt Peak	Spacewatch	(5)	1.4 km	MPC · JPL
480655	2015 OZ_{14}	—	December 27, 2011	Mount Lemmon	Mount Lemmon Survey	VER	2.6 km	MPC · JPL
480656	2015 OP_{15}	—	November 15, 2006	Mount Lemmon	Mount Lemmon Survey	EOS	2.4 km	MPC · JPL
480657	2015 OE_{17}	—	August 23, 2004	Kitt Peak	Spacewatch	·	3.1 km	MPC · JPL
480658	2015 OC_{24}	—	July 18, 2010	WISE	WISE	·	3.9 km	MPC · JPL
480659	2015 OW_{34}	—	January 20, 2013	Kitt Peak	Spacewatch	EOS	1.9 km	MPC · JPL
480660	2015 OV_{35}	—	January 17, 2013	Mount Lemmon	Mount Lemmon Survey	·	3.7 km	MPC · JPL
480661	2015 OL_{37}	—	November 11, 2009	Mount Lemmon	Mount Lemmon Survey	·	680 m	MPC · JPL
480662	2015 OA_{40}	—	September 14, 2009	Kitt Peak	Spacewatch	CYB	3.4 km	MPC · JPL
480663	2015 OW_{43}	—	October 1, 2005	Kitt Peak	Spacewatch	·	2.4 km	MPC · JPL
480664	2015 OC_{45}	—	January 14, 2013	Mount Lemmon	Mount Lemmon Survey	EOS	2.0 km	MPC · JPL
480665	2015 OS_{46}	—	January 31, 2006	Mount Lemmon	Mount Lemmon Survey	·	1.2 km	MPC · JPL
480666	2015 OQ_{51}	—	May 1, 2010	WISE	WISE	·	3.2 km	MPC · JPL
480667	2015 OU_{66}	—	November 4, 2007	Kitt Peak	Spacewatch	·	1.9 km	MPC · JPL
480668	2015 ON_{68}	—	September 18, 2003	Kitt Peak	Spacewatch	·	1.4 km	MPC · JPL
480669	2015 OG_{71}	—	November 20, 2007	Mount Lemmon	Mount Lemmon Survey	·	2.6 km	MPC · JPL
480670	2015 OL_{71}	—	March 8, 2008	Mount Lemmon	Mount Lemmon Survey	·	2.6 km	MPC · JPL
480671	2015 OB_{73}	—	September 11, 2010	Kitt Peak	Spacewatch	HYG	2.2 km	MPC · JPL
480672	2015 OC_{73}	—	November 17, 2006	Kitt Peak	Spacewatch	EOS	1.9 km	MPC · JPL
480673	2015 OQ_{73}	—	May 14, 2009	Mount Lemmon	Mount Lemmon Survey	·	2.9 km	MPC · JPL
480674	2015 PN_{1}	—	November 11, 2005	Kitt Peak	Spacewatch	·	3.1 km	MPC · JPL
480675	2015 PC_{3}	—	April 17, 2009	Mount Lemmon	Mount Lemmon Survey	·	1.8 km	MPC · JPL
480676	2015 PJ_{5}	—	June 27, 2010	WISE	WISE	·	2.8 km	MPC · JPL
480677	2015 PZ_{12}	—	June 30, 2010	WISE	WISE	·	4.1 km	MPC · JPL
480678	2015 PT_{25}	—	November 19, 2007	Mount Lemmon	Mount Lemmon Survey	AGN	980 m	MPC · JPL
480679	2015 PB_{35}	—	August 31, 2005	Kitt Peak	Spacewatch	·	1.7 km	MPC · JPL
480680	2015 PT_{39}	—	January 19, 2012	Kitt Peak	Spacewatch	CYB	3.7 km	MPC · JPL
480681	2015 PJ_{41}	—	December 20, 2009	Kitt Peak	Spacewatch	3:2	6.2 km	MPC · JPL
480682	2015 PQ_{42}	—	May 3, 2008	Mount Lemmon	Mount Lemmon Survey	·	2.9 km	MPC · JPL
480683	2015 PS_{43}	—	January 2, 2012	Mount Lemmon	Mount Lemmon Survey	·	3.8 km	MPC · JPL
480684	2015 PE_{45}	—	December 8, 2005	Kitt Peak	Spacewatch	VER	3.1 km	MPC · JPL
480685	2015 PV_{45}	—	January 17, 2007	Kitt Peak	Spacewatch	·	3.7 km	MPC · JPL
480686	2015 PA_{49}	—	June 2, 2006	Kitt Peak	Spacewatch	·	2.6 km	MPC · JPL
480687	2015 PB_{49}	—	April 30, 2009	Mount Lemmon	Mount Lemmon Survey	HOF	2.4 km	MPC · JPL
480688	2015 PR_{51}	—	November 19, 2007	Kitt Peak	Spacewatch	·	2.5 km	MPC · JPL
480689	2015 PJ_{87}	—	March 21, 2009	Kitt Peak	Spacewatch	AGN	1.2 km	MPC · JPL
480690	2015 PP_{93}	—	October 1, 2011	Kitt Peak	Spacewatch	(16286)	1.7 km	MPC · JPL
480691	2015 PP_{94}	—	November 4, 2007	Kitt Peak	Spacewatch	NEM	1.9 km	MPC · JPL
480692	2015 PB_{96}	—	December 29, 2008	Mount Lemmon	Mount Lemmon Survey	·	1.9 km	MPC · JPL
480693	2015 PK_{101}	—	April 11, 2005	Mount Lemmon	Mount Lemmon Survey	·	1.5 km	MPC · JPL
480694	2015 PK_{110}	—	August 28, 2005	Kitt Peak	Spacewatch	·	1.9 km	MPC · JPL
480695	2015 PZ_{116}	—	April 2, 2005	Mount Lemmon	Mount Lemmon Survey	·	2.2 km	MPC · JPL
480696	2015 PS_{120}	—	September 14, 2005	Kitt Peak	Spacewatch	·	2.0 km	MPC · JPL
480697	2015 PY_{125}	—	January 27, 2007	Mount Lemmon	Mount Lemmon Survey	·	2.9 km	MPC · JPL
480698	2015 PP_{127}	—	January 19, 2004	Kitt Peak	Spacewatch	PAD	1.6 km	MPC · JPL
480699	2015 PH_{128}	—	February 8, 2002	Kitt Peak	Spacewatch	·	2.5 km	MPC · JPL
480700	2015 PW_{131}	—	October 29, 2005	Catalina	CSS	·	930 m	MPC · JPL

== 480701–480800 ==
back to top

Designation			Discovery			Properties		Ref
Permanent	Provisional	Named after	Date	Site	Discoverer(s)	Category	Diam.	Ref
480701	2015 PT_{161}	—	October 16, 2003	Kitt Peak	Spacewatch	·	1.5 km	MPC · JPL
480702	2015 PX_{173}	—	December 27, 1999	Kitt Peak	Spacewatch	fast	3.6 km	MPC · JPL
480703	2015 PE_{212}	—	March 17, 2010	WISE	WISE	·	2.3 km	MPC · JPL
480704	2015 PL_{258}	—	September 13, 2005	Kitt Peak	Spacewatch	·	1.8 km	MPC · JPL
480705	2015 PY_{264}	—	November 21, 2006	Mount Lemmon	Mount Lemmon Survey	·	4.6 km	MPC · JPL
480706	2015 PX_{284}	—	November 26, 2005	Mount Lemmon	Mount Lemmon Survey	HYG	3.1 km	MPC · JPL
480707	2015 PO_{288}	—	December 11, 2006	Kitt Peak	Spacewatch	·	5.1 km	MPC · JPL
480708	2015 PX_{302}	—	August 7, 2010	WISE	WISE	·	4.1 km	MPC · JPL
480709	2015 PC_{307}	—	July 11, 1997	Kitt Peak	Spacewatch	·	1.7 km	MPC · JPL
480710	2015 RL_{8}	—	September 18, 2010	Mount Lemmon	Mount Lemmon Survey	·	3.1 km	MPC · JPL
480711	2015 RT_{12}	—	February 8, 2008	Kitt Peak	Spacewatch	THM	2.3 km	MPC · JPL
480712	2015 RY_{107}	—	September 4, 2007	Mount Lemmon	Mount Lemmon Survey	T_{j} (2.95) · 3:2	4.8 km	MPC · JPL
480713	2015 RZ_{212}	—	November 11, 2010	Mount Lemmon	Mount Lemmon Survey	·	3.4 km	MPC · JPL
480714	2015 RN_{228}	—	February 27, 2006	Mount Lemmon	Mount Lemmon Survey	THM	2.7 km	MPC · JPL
480715	2015 SS_{11}	—	April 19, 2007	Mount Lemmon	Mount Lemmon Survey	·	3.6 km	MPC · JPL
480716	2015 TL_{1}	—	August 21, 1999	Kitt Peak	Spacewatch	·	3.2 km	MPC · JPL
480717	2015 TM_{1}	—	February 17, 2007	Mount Lemmon	Mount Lemmon Survey	·	3.9 km	MPC · JPL
480718	2015 TB_{296}	—	February 2, 2006	Kitt Peak	Spacewatch	·	1.2 km	MPC · JPL
480719	2015 TZ_{297}	—	September 17, 2006	Catalina	CSS	JUN	1.8 km	MPC · JPL
480720	2015 TJ_{314}	—	March 14, 2007	Kitt Peak	Spacewatch	·	2.2 km	MPC · JPL
480721	2015 TG_{348}	—	November 6, 2005	Mount Lemmon	Mount Lemmon Survey	·	2.6 km	MPC · JPL
480722	2015 UE_{26}	—	October 10, 2004	Kitt Peak	Spacewatch	VER	3.5 km	MPC · JPL
480723	2015 UT_{26}	—	October 22, 2006	Kitt Peak	Spacewatch	AGN	1.4 km	MPC · JPL
480724	2015 UG_{33}	—	March 26, 2007	Mount Lemmon	Mount Lemmon Survey	·	3.5 km	MPC · JPL
480725	2015 VU_{114}	—	November 3, 2010	Mount Lemmon	Mount Lemmon Survey	EOS	2.1 km	MPC · JPL
480726	2015 VS_{125}	—	December 5, 2005	Kitt Peak	Spacewatch	·	3.1 km	MPC · JPL
480727	2016 JK_{18}	—	June 25, 2009	Siding Spring	SSS	PHO	2.8 km	MPC · JPL
480728	2016 JG_{34}	—	July 16, 2005	Catalina	CSS	·	3.7 km	MPC · JPL
480729	2016 MN_{1}	—	July 1, 2008	Kitt Peak	Spacewatch	·	1.5 km	MPC · JPL
480730	2016 NK_{1}	—	September 9, 1999	Socorro	LINEAR	·	1.4 km	MPC · JPL
480731	2016 NB_{2}	—	April 28, 2012	Mount Lemmon	Mount Lemmon Survey	·	800 m	MPC · JPL
480732	2016 NM_{3}	—	September 19, 2006	Catalina	CSS	·	890 m	MPC · JPL
480733	2016 NB_{4}	—	June 13, 2005	Mount Lemmon	Mount Lemmon Survey	NYS	1.1 km	MPC · JPL
480734	2016 NC_{4}	—	October 30, 2005	Kitt Peak	Spacewatch	·	1.2 km	MPC · JPL
480735	2016 NO_{5}	—	February 26, 2009	Catalina	CSS	·	2.8 km	MPC · JPL
480736	2016 NP_{5}	—	October 13, 2012	Catalina	CSS	·	2.1 km	MPC · JPL
480737	2016 NO_{8}	—	April 2, 2006	Catalina	CSS	GEF	1.6 km	MPC · JPL
480738	2016 NQ_{8}	—	November 1, 2013	Mount Lemmon	Mount Lemmon Survey	·	840 m	MPC · JPL
480739	2016 NZ_{9}	—	January 31, 1997	Kitt Peak	Spacewatch	·	1.3 km	MPC · JPL
480740	2016 NA_{10}	—	January 5, 2006	Mount Lemmon	Mount Lemmon Survey	·	1.5 km	MPC · JPL
480741	2016 NO_{10}	—	May 5, 2003	Kitt Peak	Spacewatch	·	1.7 km	MPC · JPL
480742	2016 NE_{12}	—	October 16, 2012	Mount Lemmon	Mount Lemmon Survey	·	2.5 km	MPC · JPL
480743	2016 NV_{14}	—	May 21, 2012	Mount Lemmon	Mount Lemmon Survey	MAR	970 m	MPC · JPL
480744	2016 NY_{16}	—	May 2, 2011	Catalina	CSS	·	2.4 km	MPC · JPL
480745	2016 NN_{21}	—	July 30, 2012	Siding Spring	SSS	·	2.1 km	MPC · JPL
480746	2016 NM_{23}	—	January 26, 2000	Kitt Peak	Spacewatch	PHO	1.1 km	MPC · JPL
480747	2016 NZ_{23}	—	June 13, 2007	Catalina	CSS	·	3.8 km	MPC · JPL
480748	2016 NQ_{26}	—	November 2, 2007	Kitt Peak	Spacewatch	·	3.5 km	MPC · JPL
480749	2016 NM_{29}	—	October 20, 2012	Kitt Peak	Spacewatch	·	2.9 km	MPC · JPL
480750	2016 NK_{30}	—	April 25, 2000	Anderson Mesa	LONEOS	·	1.6 km	MPC · JPL
480751	2016 NV_{37}	—	March 14, 2007	Mount Lemmon	Mount Lemmon Survey	·	1.3 km	MPC · JPL
480752	2016 NJ_{40}	—	February 15, 2010	Kitt Peak	Spacewatch	WIT	1.0 km	MPC · JPL
480753	2016 NS_{40}	—	February 28, 2008	Mount Lemmon	Mount Lemmon Survey	·	2.9 km	MPC · JPL
480754	2016 NV_{40}	—	April 28, 2011	Mount Lemmon	Mount Lemmon Survey	·	1.3 km	MPC · JPL
480755	2016 NY_{41}	—	July 12, 2005	Mount Lemmon	Mount Lemmon Survey	·	2.3 km	MPC · JPL
480756	2016 NQ_{43}	—	May 12, 2007	Mount Lemmon	Mount Lemmon Survey	·	1.2 km	MPC · JPL
480757	2016 NR_{43}	—	August 10, 2007	Kitt Peak	Spacewatch	HOF	2.6 km	MPC · JPL
480758	2016 NW_{43}	—	February 9, 2010	Kitt Peak	Spacewatch	·	1.7 km	MPC · JPL
480759	2016 NJ_{45}	—	May 18, 2004	Campo Imperatore	CINEOS	·	3.4 km	MPC · JPL
480760	2016 NU_{45}	—	January 27, 2006	Mount Lemmon	Mount Lemmon Survey	·	1.2 km	MPC · JPL
480761	2016 NF_{46}	—	November 5, 2007	Kitt Peak	Spacewatch	·	2.3 km	MPC · JPL
480762	2016 NH_{46}	—	December 1, 2005	Mount Lemmon	Mount Lemmon Survey	·	1.7 km	MPC · JPL
480763	2016 NQ_{47}	—	October 2, 2003	Kitt Peak	Spacewatch	·	2.3 km	MPC · JPL
480764	2016 NB_{52}	—	May 28, 2009	Mount Lemmon	Mount Lemmon Survey	·	580 m	MPC · JPL
480765	2016 NZ_{53}	—	December 13, 2006	Kitt Peak	Spacewatch	·	4.0 km	MPC · JPL
480766	2016 NF_{55}	—	September 29, 2009	Mount Lemmon	Mount Lemmon Survey	·	910 m	MPC · JPL
480767	2016 OG_{3}	—	December 18, 2007	Mount Lemmon	Mount Lemmon Survey	·	2.6 km	MPC · JPL
480768	2016 PX_{2}	—	March 3, 2006	Anderson Mesa	LONEOS	·	1.5 km	MPC · JPL
480769	2016 PS_{6}	—	November 20, 2006	Kitt Peak	Spacewatch	·	2.1 km	MPC · JPL
480770	2016 PX_{6}	—	December 4, 2007	Kitt Peak	Spacewatch	·	1.8 km	MPC · JPL
480771	2016 PF_{9}	—	January 26, 2007	Kitt Peak	Spacewatch	SUL	2.3 km	MPC · JPL
480772	2016 PR_{9}	—	April 10, 2010	Mount Lemmon	Mount Lemmon Survey	EOS	1.8 km	MPC · JPL
480773	2016 PR_{11}	—	September 11, 2007	Mount Lemmon	Mount Lemmon Survey	·	1.5 km	MPC · JPL
480774	2016 PF_{12}	—	August 30, 2005	Campo Imperatore	CINEOS	·	3.0 km	MPC · JPL
480775	2016 PG_{12}	—	November 19, 2003	Kitt Peak	Spacewatch	·	3.1 km	MPC · JPL
480776	2016 PA_{13}	—	November 15, 2006	Kitt Peak	Spacewatch	·	3.0 km	MPC · JPL
480777	2016 PL_{13}	—	October 17, 2006	Mount Lemmon	Mount Lemmon Survey	·	3.8 km	MPC · JPL
480778	2016 PC_{14}	—	April 25, 2007	Kitt Peak	Spacewatch	EUN	1.1 km	MPC · JPL
480779	2016 PO_{17}	—	April 26, 2011	Mount Lemmon	Mount Lemmon Survey	·	1.9 km	MPC · JPL
480780	2016 PR_{17}	—	May 1, 2006	Kitt Peak	Spacewatch	·	760 m	MPC · JPL
480781	2016 PY_{20}	—	March 15, 2007	Mount Lemmon	Mount Lemmon Survey	·	1.6 km	MPC · JPL
480782	2016 PS_{25}	—	December 8, 2010	Mount Lemmon	Mount Lemmon Survey	·	560 m	MPC · JPL
480783	2016 PX_{25}	—	January 31, 2008	Kitt Peak	Spacewatch	·	5.4 km	MPC · JPL
480784	2016 PK_{26}	—	September 18, 2003	Kitt Peak	Spacewatch	·	1.6 km	MPC · JPL
480785	2016 PW_{27}	—	November 17, 2006	Mount Lemmon	Mount Lemmon Survey	·	3.0 km	MPC · JPL
480786	2016 PF_{28}	—	April 15, 2001	Kitt Peak	Spacewatch	V	670 m	MPC · JPL
480787	2016 PU_{28}	—	March 13, 2010	WISE	WISE	·	2.9 km	MPC · JPL
480788	2016 PH_{30}	—	September 21, 2008	Siding Spring	SSS	·	3.0 km	MPC · JPL
480789	2016 PJ_{30}	—	April 2, 2009	Kitt Peak	Spacewatch	·	5.0 km	MPC · JPL
480790	2016 PS_{35}	—	October 23, 2006	Mount Lemmon	Mount Lemmon Survey	VER	5.5 km	MPC · JPL
480791	2016 PA_{37}	—	November 18, 2006	Kitt Peak	Spacewatch	·	2.7 km	MPC · JPL
480792	2016 PE_{40}	—	June 13, 2013	Kitt Peak	Spacewatch	H	570 m	MPC · JPL
480793	2016 PV_{45}	—	September 27, 2008	Catalina	CSS	EUN	1.3 km	MPC · JPL
480794	2016 PQ_{53}	—	December 19, 2001	Kitt Peak	Spacewatch	·	2.9 km	MPC · JPL
480795	2016 PP_{54}	—	April 27, 2009	Mount Lemmon	Mount Lemmon Survey	·	830 m	MPC · JPL
480796	2016 PT_{54}	—	March 28, 2009	Kitt Peak	Spacewatch	·	3.2 km	MPC · JPL
480797	2016 PK_{56}	—	May 3, 2005	Kitt Peak	Spacewatch	·	710 m	MPC · JPL
480798	2016 PS_{56}	—	December 3, 2012	Mount Lemmon	Mount Lemmon Survey	EOS	2.0 km	MPC · JPL
480799	2016 PN_{57}	—	September 8, 2005	Siding Spring	SSS	·	5.0 km	MPC · JPL
480800	2016 PE_{58}	—	November 18, 2008	Kitt Peak	Spacewatch	·	1.6 km	MPC · JPL

== 480801–480900 ==
back to top

Designation			Discovery			Properties		Ref
Permanent	Provisional	Named after	Date	Site	Discoverer(s)	Category	Diam.	Ref
480801	2016 PX_{58}	—	December 25, 2005	Mount Lemmon	Mount Lemmon Survey	·	880 m	MPC · JPL
480802	2016 PV_{59}	—	May 19, 2010	WISE	WISE	DOR	2.3 km	MPC · JPL
480803	2016 PJ_{62}	—	October 28, 2011	Mount Lemmon	Mount Lemmon Survey	·	3.4 km	MPC · JPL
480804	2016 PF_{65}	—	January 15, 2008	Mount Lemmon	Mount Lemmon Survey	·	3.0 km	MPC · JPL
480805	2687 P-L	—	September 24, 1960	Palomar	C. J. van Houten, I. van Houten-Groeneveld, T. Gehrels	·	1.4 km	MPC · JPL
480806	1083 T-1	—	March 25, 1971	Palomar	C. J. van Houten, I. van Houten-Groeneveld, T. Gehrels	·	1.5 km	MPC · JPL
480807	1994 SK_{7}	—	September 28, 1994	Kitt Peak	Spacewatch	NYS	850 m	MPC · JPL
480808	1994 XL_{1}	—	December 6, 1994	Siding Spring	R. H. McNaught	ATE · PHA	260 m	MPC · JPL
480809	1995 SW_{5}	—	September 17, 1995	Kitt Peak	Spacewatch	·	730 m	MPC · JPL
480810	1995 TF_{3}	—	September 18, 1995	Kitt Peak	Spacewatch	·	1.2 km	MPC · JPL
480811	1995 UK_{81}	—	October 28, 1995	Kitt Peak	Spacewatch	·	1.2 km	MPC · JPL
480812	1995 WV_{23}	—	November 18, 1995	Kitt Peak	Spacewatch	·	1.8 km	MPC · JPL
480813	1995 WN_{24}	—	November 18, 1995	Kitt Peak	Spacewatch	·	1.1 km	MPC · JPL
480814	1995 XO_{4}	—	December 14, 1995	Kitt Peak	Spacewatch	EUN	1.2 km	MPC · JPL
480815	1996 AC_{10}	—	January 13, 1996	Kitt Peak	Spacewatch	EOS	1.9 km	MPC · JPL
480816	1997 ND	—	July 1, 1997	Kitt Peak	Spacewatch	·	1.2 km	MPC · JPL
480817	1998 SJ_{2}	—	September 18, 1998	Caussols	ODAS	AMO +1km	800 m	MPC · JPL
480818	1998 SJ_{60}	—	September 17, 1998	Anderson Mesa	LONEOS	·	3.2 km	MPC · JPL
480819	1998 SJ_{84}	—	September 26, 1998	Socorro	LINEAR	·	820 m	MPC · JPL
480820	1998 VF_{32}	—	November 14, 1998	Socorro	LINEAR	ATE · PHA	230 m	MPC · JPL
480821	1998 WA_{4}	—	November 19, 1998	Catalina	CSS	·	1.6 km	MPC · JPL
480822	1998 YM_{4}	—	December 19, 1998	Oohira	T. Urata	APO · PHA	410 m	MPC · JPL
480823	1998 YW_{5}	—	December 19, 1998	Socorro	LINEAR	APO	320 m	MPC · JPL
480824	1999 JO_{6}	—	May 13, 1999	Socorro	LINEAR	AMO +1km	1.7 km	MPC · JPL
480825	1999 PL_{1}	—	August 3, 1999	Siding Spring	R. H. McNaught	·	1.4 km	MPC · JPL
480826	1999 TJ_{77}	—	October 10, 1999	Kitt Peak	Spacewatch	·	850 m	MPC · JPL
480827	1999 TK_{133}	—	October 6, 1999	Socorro	LINEAR	·	640 m	MPC · JPL
480828	1999 TS_{191}	—	October 12, 1999	Socorro	LINEAR	·	970 m	MPC · JPL
480829	1999 TG_{218}	—	October 15, 1999	Socorro	LINEAR	(5)	1.1 km	MPC · JPL
480830	1999 TQ_{301}	—	October 3, 1999	Kitt Peak	Spacewatch	·	1.2 km	MPC · JPL
480831	1999 TC_{328}	—	October 2, 1999	Socorro	LINEAR	·	1.3 km	MPC · JPL
480832	1999 VF	—	November 1, 1999	Olathe	Olathe	·	1.3 km	MPC · JPL
480833	1999 VC_{1}	—	November 1, 1999	Catalina	CSS	·	1.2 km	MPC · JPL
480834	1999 VH_{41}	—	November 1, 1999	Kitt Peak	Spacewatch	·	3.6 km	MPC · JPL
480835	1999 VL_{88}	—	November 4, 1999	Socorro	LINEAR	·	4.5 km	MPC · JPL
480836	1999 VC_{116}	—	November 4, 1999	Kitt Peak	Spacewatch	·	1.3 km	MPC · JPL
480837	1999 VS_{123}	—	November 5, 1999	Kitt Peak	Spacewatch	·	430 m	MPC · JPL
480838	1999 VE_{199}	—	November 1, 1999	Kitt Peak	Spacewatch	·	770 m	MPC · JPL
480839	2000 AR_{149}	—	January 7, 2000	Socorro	LINEAR	·	1.8 km	MPC · JPL
480840	2000 AX_{224}	—	January 6, 2000	Kitt Peak	Spacewatch	·	850 m	MPC · JPL
480841	2000 BY_{18}	—	January 30, 2000	Socorro	LINEAR	·	2.9 km	MPC · JPL
480842	2000 CO_{13}	—	February 2, 2000	Socorro	LINEAR	·	1.5 km	MPC · JPL
480843	2000 KM_{40}	—	May 26, 2000	Kitt Peak	Spacewatch	BRA	1.5 km	MPC · JPL
480844	2000 PM_{6}	—	August 2, 2000	Socorro	LINEAR	·	1.9 km	MPC · JPL
480845	2000 QV_{229}	—	August 31, 2000	Socorro	LINEAR	·	660 m	MPC · JPL
480846	2000 SF_{83}	—	September 24, 2000	Socorro	LINEAR	·	2.7 km	MPC · JPL
480847	2000 SF_{247}	—	September 24, 2000	Socorro	LINEAR	NYS	1.3 km	MPC · JPL
480848	2000 SH_{247}	—	September 24, 2000	Socorro	LINEAR	·	1.5 km	MPC · JPL
480849	2000 SO_{306}	—	September 30, 2000	Socorro	LINEAR	·	1.7 km	MPC · JPL
480850	2000 TM_{11}	—	October 1, 2000	Socorro	LINEAR	·	1.2 km	MPC · JPL
480851	2000 WH_{71}	—	November 19, 2000	Socorro	LINEAR	·	2.4 km	MPC · JPL
480852	2000 WK_{192}	—	November 24, 2000	Mauna Kea	D. J. Tholen	T_{j} (2.91)	1.8 km	MPC · JPL
480853	2000 YH_{8}	—	December 22, 2000	Oaxaca	Roe, J. M.	·	2.6 km	MPC · JPL
480854	2001 AO_{2}	—	January 3, 2001	Socorro	LINEAR	T_{j} (2.84) · AMO	770 m	MPC · JPL
480855	2001 GF_{3}	—	April 14, 2001	Socorro	LINEAR	·	1.8 km	MPC · JPL
480856	2001 NZ_{1}	—	July 11, 2001	Palomar	NEAT	AMO +1km	820 m	MPC · JPL
480857	2001 OC_{79}	—	July 26, 2001	Palomar	NEAT	PHO	1.1 km	MPC · JPL
480858	2001 PT_{9}	—	August 11, 2001	Haleakala	NEAT	APO · PHA	240 m	MPC · JPL
480859	2001 QR_{118}	—	August 17, 2001	Socorro	LINEAR	·	2.1 km	MPC · JPL
480860	2001 QG_{166}	—	August 24, 2001	Haleakala	NEAT	·	1.3 km	MPC · JPL
480861	2001 RV_{141}	—	September 12, 2001	Socorro	LINEAR	H	440 m	MPC · JPL
480862	2001 RM_{145}	—	September 8, 2001	Socorro	LINEAR	PHO	2.9 km	MPC · JPL
480863	2001 SU_{5}	—	September 17, 2001	Socorro	LINEAR	H	560 m	MPC · JPL
480864	2001 SR_{35}	—	September 16, 2001	Socorro	LINEAR	·	1 km	MPC · JPL
480865	2001 SF_{136}	—	September 16, 2001	Socorro	LINEAR	·	900 m	MPC · JPL
480866	2001 SE_{185}	—	September 19, 2001	Socorro	LINEAR	NYS	910 m	MPC · JPL
480867	2001 SX_{213}	—	September 19, 2001	Socorro	LINEAR	·	1.0 km	MPC · JPL
480868	2001 SC_{229}	—	September 11, 2001	Kitt Peak	Spacewatch	·	1.1 km	MPC · JPL
480869	2001 SO_{232}	—	September 19, 2001	Socorro	LINEAR	·	1.1 km	MPC · JPL
480870	2001 SC_{235}	—	September 19, 2001	Socorro	LINEAR	·	1.1 km	MPC · JPL
480871	2001 SU_{245}	—	September 19, 2001	Socorro	LINEAR	·	960 m	MPC · JPL
480872	2001 SS_{273}	—	September 19, 2001	Kitt Peak	Spacewatch	NYS	830 m	MPC · JPL
480873	2001 SG_{343}	—	September 22, 2001	Kitt Peak	Spacewatch	MAS	500 m	MPC · JPL
480874	2001 TS_{192}	—	October 14, 2001	Socorro	LINEAR	·	3.2 km	MPC · JPL
480875	2001 UM_{52}	—	October 17, 2001	Socorro	LINEAR	·	1.1 km	MPC · JPL
480876	2001 VV_{113}	—	November 12, 2001	Socorro	LINEAR	·	1.1 km	MPC · JPL
480877	2001 VC_{134}	—	November 12, 2001	Apache Point	SDSS	·	920 m	MPC · JPL
480878	2001 WF_{42}	—	October 23, 2001	Kitt Peak	Spacewatch	·	2.2 km	MPC · JPL
480879	2001 WG_{64}	—	November 19, 2001	Socorro	LINEAR	·	1.1 km	MPC · JPL
480880	2001 XA_{20}	—	December 9, 2001	Socorro	LINEAR	·	1.2 km	MPC · JPL
480881	2001 XT_{102}	—	November 21, 2001	Socorro	LINEAR	·	1.4 km	MPC · JPL
480882	2001 XE_{134}	—	December 14, 2001	Socorro	LINEAR	·	1.1 km	MPC · JPL
480883	2001 YE_{4}	—	December 21, 2001	Socorro	LINEAR	ATE · PHA	230 m	MPC · JPL
480884	2002 AN_{7}	—	January 9, 2002	Cima Ekar	ADAS	H	370 m	MPC · JPL
480885	2002 AC_{29}	—	January 13, 2002	Socorro	LINEAR	APO +1km	900 m	MPC · JPL
480886	2002 CR_{67}	—	January 13, 2002	Kitt Peak	Spacewatch	·	990 m	MPC · JPL
480887	2002 CQ_{123}	—	January 19, 2002	Kitt Peak	Spacewatch	·	1.7 km	MPC · JPL
480888	2002 EH_{161}	—	March 6, 2002	Palomar	NEAT	·	1.5 km	MPC · JPL
480889	2002 FM_{21}	—	March 19, 2002	Anderson Mesa	LONEOS	·	1.3 km	MPC · JPL
480890	2002 FB_{27}	—	March 20, 2002	Socorro	LINEAR	·	1.6 km	MPC · JPL
480891	2002 JH_{114}	—	May 8, 2002	Socorro	LINEAR	H	600 m	MPC · JPL
480892	2002 NR_{73}	—	July 12, 2002	Palomar	NEAT	·	1.6 km	MPC · JPL
480893	2002 OV_{7}	—	July 9, 2002	Socorro	LINEAR	H	750 m	MPC · JPL
480894	2002 PO_{7}	—	August 6, 2002	Palomar	NEAT	H	480 m	MPC · JPL
480895	2002 PW_{111}	—	August 14, 2002	Socorro	LINEAR	·	570 m	MPC · JPL
480896	2002 PW_{112}	—	August 12, 2002	Socorro	LINEAR	·	1.7 km	MPC · JPL
480897	2002 QA_{7}	—	August 16, 2002	Socorro	LINEAR	·	660 m	MPC · JPL
480898	2002 QP_{15}	—	August 18, 2002	Palomar	NEAT	·	890 m	MPC · JPL
480899	2002 QG_{76}	—	August 16, 2002	Palomar	NEAT	ADE	1.8 km	MPC · JPL
480900	2002 QA_{129}	—	August 29, 2002	Palomar	NEAT	·	490 m	MPC · JPL

== 480901–481000 ==
back to top

Designation			Discovery			Properties		Ref
Permanent	Provisional	Named after	Date	Site	Discoverer(s)	Category	Diam.	Ref
480901	2002 QX_{132}	—	August 27, 2002	Palomar	NEAT	·	480 m	MPC · JPL
480902	2002 RV_{59}	—	September 5, 2002	Anderson Mesa	LONEOS	·	730 m	MPC · JPL
480903	2002 RF_{213}	—	September 12, 2002	Haleakala	NEAT	·	1.5 km	MPC · JPL
480904	2002 RQ_{242}	—	September 14, 2002	Palomar	NEAT	·	790 m	MPC · JPL
480905	2002 RS_{257}	—	September 9, 2002	Palomar	NEAT	·	590 m	MPC · JPL
480906	2002 SD_{29}	—	September 28, 2002	Palomar	NEAT	(2076)	590 m	MPC · JPL
480907	2002 SB_{65}	—	September 17, 2002	Palomar	NEAT	·	1.6 km	MPC · JPL
480908	2002 TB_{31}	—	October 2, 2002	Socorro	LINEAR	·	1.9 km	MPC · JPL
480909	2002 TB_{64}	—	October 4, 2002	Socorro	LINEAR	·	1.6 km	MPC · JPL
480910	2002 TT_{182}	—	October 4, 2002	Palomar	NEAT	·	690 m	MPC · JPL
480911	2002 TN_{186}	—	October 4, 2002	Socorro	LINEAR	·	2.0 km	MPC · JPL
480912	2002 TV_{221}	—	July 13, 2002	Socorro	LINEAR	·	2.9 km	MPC · JPL
480913	2002 TF_{306}	—	October 4, 2002	Apache Point	SDSS	·	1.8 km	MPC · JPL
480914	2002 UA_{63}	—	October 30, 2002	Apache Point	SDSS	·	3.6 km	MPC · JPL
480915	2002 VT_{7}	—	November 1, 2002	Palomar	NEAT	·	880 m	MPC · JPL
480916	2002 VD_{59}	—	November 7, 2002	Needville	Needville	·	2.2 km	MPC · JPL
480917	2002 VU_{98}	—	November 13, 2002	Kitt Peak	Spacewatch	·	420 m	MPC · JPL
480918	2002 VF_{118}	—	November 14, 2002	Socorro	LINEAR	·	1.1 km	MPC · JPL
480919	2002 WA	—	November 16, 2002	Las Cruces	Dixon, D. S.	·	1.3 km	MPC · JPL
480920	2002 WE_{26}	—	November 16, 2002	Palomar	NEAT	·	770 m	MPC · JPL
480921	2002 XL_{31}	—	December 6, 2002	Socorro	LINEAR	·	2.1 km	MPC · JPL
480922	2002 XP_{37}	—	December 7, 2002	Socorro	LINEAR	ATE	270 m	MPC · JPL
480923	2002 XH_{49}	—	December 10, 2002	Socorro	LINEAR	·	1.9 km	MPC · JPL
480924	2002 XA_{53}	—	December 10, 2002	Socorro	LINEAR	·	1.5 km	MPC · JPL
480925	2002 XT_{60}	—	December 10, 2002	Socorro	LINEAR	PHO	1.3 km	MPC · JPL
480926	2002 XE_{120}	—	December 3, 2002	Palomar	NEAT	·	820 m	MPC · JPL
480927	2002 YZ_{3}	—	December 28, 2002	Socorro	LINEAR	APO	730 m	MPC · JPL
480928	2003 AT_{55}	—	January 5, 2003	Socorro	LINEAR	·	1.3 km	MPC · JPL
480929	2003 BM_{24}	—	January 25, 2003	Palomar	NEAT	PHO	1.1 km	MPC · JPL
480930	2003 BD_{87}	—	January 26, 2003	Anderson Mesa	LONEOS	PHO	1.1 km	MPC · JPL
480931	2003 GY_{55}	—	April 7, 2003	Socorro	LINEAR	·	1.9 km	MPC · JPL
480932	2003 HE_{33}	—	April 26, 2003	Kitt Peak	Spacewatch	·	1.3 km	MPC · JPL
480933	2003 JO_{2}	—	May 1, 2003	Kitt Peak	Spacewatch	·	1.1 km	MPC · JPL
480934	2003 LX_{5}	—	April 1, 2003	Socorro	LINEAR	AMO +1km	1.1 km	MPC · JPL
480935	2003 OO_{20}	—	July 31, 2003	Reedy Creek	J. Broughton	·	1.4 km	MPC · JPL
480936	2003 QH_{5}	—	August 21, 2003	Socorro	LINEAR	APO · PHA	540 m	MPC · JPL
480937	2003 QY_{35}	—	August 22, 2003	Socorro	LINEAR	·	1.2 km	MPC · JPL
480938	2003 QO_{80}	—	August 22, 2003	Palomar	NEAT	·	1.4 km	MPC · JPL
480939	2003 RB_{21}	—	September 16, 2003	Kitt Peak	Spacewatch	·	610 m	MPC · JPL
480940	2003 SP_{102}	—	September 20, 2003	Socorro	LINEAR	·	2.0 km	MPC · JPL
480941	2003 SO_{103}	—	September 20, 2003	Socorro	LINEAR	·	1.3 km	MPC · JPL
480942	2003 SO_{122}	—	September 18, 2003	Anderson Mesa	LONEOS	·	1.6 km	MPC · JPL
480943	2003 SP_{163}	—	September 22, 2003	Kitt Peak	Spacewatch	(5)	1.3 km	MPC · JPL
480944	2003 SX_{199}	—	September 21, 2003	Anderson Mesa	LONEOS	·	1.7 km	MPC · JPL
480945	2003 SD_{217}	—	September 27, 2003	Desert Eagle	W. K. Y. Yeung	·	1.4 km	MPC · JPL
480946	2003 SR_{237}	—	September 26, 2003	Socorro	LINEAR	·	1.4 km	MPC · JPL
480947	2003 SG_{278}	—	September 30, 2003	Socorro	LINEAR	·	1.6 km	MPC · JPL
480948	2003 SD_{292}	—	September 21, 2003	Kitt Peak	Spacewatch	·	1.2 km	MPC · JPL
480949	2003 SY_{294}	—	September 28, 2003	Socorro	LINEAR	·	2.2 km	MPC · JPL
480950	2003 SU_{322}	—	September 16, 2003	Anderson Mesa	LONEOS	·	1.5 km	MPC · JPL
480951	2003 SE_{324}	—	September 16, 2003	Kitt Peak	Spacewatch	·	900 m	MPC · JPL
480952	2003 SN_{324}	—	September 17, 2003	Kitt Peak	Spacewatch	·	1.3 km	MPC · JPL
480953	2003 SA_{337}	—	September 27, 2003	Apache Point	SDSS	·	1.5 km	MPC · JPL
480954	2003 SL_{341}	—	September 16, 2003	Kitt Peak	Spacewatch	·	1.2 km	MPC · JPL
480955	2003 SR_{350}	—	September 19, 2003	Kitt Peak	Spacewatch	·	1.2 km	MPC · JPL
480956	2003 SD_{417}	—	September 28, 2003	Apache Point	SDSS	·	3.0 km	MPC · JPL
480957	2003 TY_{44}	—	September 21, 2003	Kitt Peak	Spacewatch	·	1.1 km	MPC · JPL
480958	2003 TM_{48}	—	October 3, 2003	Kitt Peak	Spacewatch	(5)	1.3 km	MPC · JPL
480959	2003 UZ_{3}	—	September 28, 2003	Kitt Peak	Spacewatch	fast	1.3 km	MPC · JPL
480960	2003 UU_{30}	—	October 16, 2003	Kitt Peak	Spacewatch	·	530 m	MPC · JPL
480961	2003 US_{32}	—	October 16, 2003	Kitt Peak	Spacewatch	·	860 m	MPC · JPL
480962	2003 UP_{87}	—	September 21, 2003	Anderson Mesa	LONEOS	·	1.6 km	MPC · JPL
480963	2003 UH_{90}	—	September 28, 2003	Socorro	LINEAR	fast	1.4 km	MPC · JPL
480964	2003 UH_{146}	—	October 21, 2003	Socorro	LINEAR	·	1.5 km	MPC · JPL
480965	2003 UV_{159}	—	October 21, 2003	Palomar	NEAT	·	1.4 km	MPC · JPL
480966	2003 UP_{206}	—	October 22, 2003	Socorro	LINEAR	·	1.6 km	MPC · JPL
480967	2003 UB_{207}	—	October 5, 2003	Kitt Peak	Spacewatch	·	1.5 km	MPC · JPL
480968	2003 UB_{256}	—	October 25, 2003	Socorro	LINEAR	(1547)	1.5 km	MPC · JPL
480969	2003 UQ_{299}	—	October 16, 2003	Kitt Peak	Spacewatch	·	1.1 km	MPC · JPL
480970	2003 UD_{308}	—	October 18, 2003	Palomar	NEAT	·	1.4 km	MPC · JPL
480971	2003 UN_{317}	—	October 22, 2003	Apache Point	SDSS	KON	3.1 km	MPC · JPL
480972	2003 UW_{344}	—	October 19, 2003	Apache Point	SDSS	(5)	860 m	MPC · JPL
480973	2003 UH_{366}	—	October 20, 2003	Kitt Peak	Spacewatch	·	1.3 km	MPC · JPL
480974	2003 WZ_{2}	—	November 18, 2003	Kitt Peak	Spacewatch	EUN	1.0 km	MPC · JPL
480975	2003 WL_{12}	—	November 16, 2003	Kitt Peak	Spacewatch	H	500 m	MPC · JPL
480976	2003 WX_{63}	—	November 19, 2003	Kitt Peak	Spacewatch	·	1.0 km	MPC · JPL
480977	2003 WN_{105}	—	November 21, 2003	Socorro	LINEAR	·	540 m	MPC · JPL
480978	2003 WR_{149}	—	November 19, 2003	Anderson Mesa	LONEOS	(1547)	1.7 km	MPC · JPL
480979	2003 WC_{154}	—	November 20, 2003	Catalina	CSS	·	1.8 km	MPC · JPL
480980	2003 WR_{154}	—	October 29, 2003	Anderson Mesa	LONEOS	·	1.2 km	MPC · JPL
480981	2003 XY_{8}	—	November 21, 2003	Socorro	LINEAR	·	2.2 km	MPC · JPL
480982	2003 YR_{2}	—	December 18, 2003	Socorro	LINEAR	H	500 m	MPC · JPL
480983	2003 YL_{26}	—	December 18, 2003	Kitt Peak	Spacewatch	(1547) · fast	1.8 km	MPC · JPL
480984	2003 YR_{70}	—	December 22, 2003	Socorro	LINEAR	AMO	330 m	MPC · JPL
480985	2003 YY_{80}	—	December 18, 2003	Socorro	LINEAR	JUN	1.1 km	MPC · JPL
480986	2004 BL_{28}	—	December 19, 2003	Socorro	LINEAR	H	660 m	MPC · JPL
480987	2004 BJ_{41}	—	December 29, 2003	Socorro	LINEAR	H	600 m	MPC · JPL
480988	2004 BX_{52}	—	January 21, 2004	Socorro	LINEAR	MAR	1.1 km	MPC · JPL
480989	2004 BR_{85}	—	January 28, 2004	Catalina	CSS	H	450 m	MPC · JPL
480990	2004 BV_{114}	—	January 29, 2004	Socorro	LINEAR	·	1.2 km	MPC · JPL
480991	2004 BB_{138}	—	January 19, 2004	Kitt Peak	Spacewatch	(12739)	1.5 km	MPC · JPL
480992	2004 BD_{144}	—	January 19, 2004	Kitt Peak	Spacewatch	·	1.8 km	MPC · JPL
480993	2004 CC_{1}	—	February 10, 2004	Socorro	LINEAR	·	2.3 km	MPC · JPL
480994	2004 CQ_{27}	—	January 30, 2004	Socorro	LINEAR	·	1.9 km	MPC · JPL
480995	2004 CW_{127}	—	February 13, 2004	Kitt Peak	Spacewatch	·	1.8 km	MPC · JPL
480996	2004 DU_{14}	—	February 17, 2004	Kitt Peak	Spacewatch	·	2.3 km	MPC · JPL
480997	2004 DT_{39}	—	February 23, 2004	Socorro	LINEAR	·	1.9 km	MPC · JPL
480998	2004 DE_{46}	—	February 19, 2004	Socorro	LINEAR	·	1.8 km	MPC · JPL
480999	2004 EL_{70}	—	March 15, 2004	Kitt Peak	Spacewatch	·	1.5 km	MPC · JPL
481000	2004 FL_{89}	—	February 13, 2004	Kitt Peak	Spacewatch	DOR	2.5 km	MPC · JPL

back to top
